= Aranha (footballer, born 1946) =

Brazilian footballer (born 1946)

Personal information
- Full name: Antônio Aranha Alves
- Date of birth: 4 August 1946 (age 80)
- Place of birth: Sorocaba, São Paulo, Brazil
- Position: Right-back

Youth career
- 1968–1969: Fluminense

Senior career*
| Years | Team | Apps | (Gls) |
| 1967–1974 | São Bento | | |
| 1968 | → São Paulo (loan) | | |
| 1972–1973 | → Remo (loan) | 43 | (0) |
| 1973 | → Atlético Mineiro (loan) | 18 | (0) |
| 1974 | → Remo (loan) | | |
| 1975 | Comercial–MS | | |
| 1976 | Sport Recife | | |
| 1977 | Comercial–MS | | |
- * Club domestic league appearances and goals

Antônio Aranha Alves (born 4 August 1946), commonly known as Aranha is a Brazilian retired footballer. He played as a right-back for a variety of clubs throughout the late 1960s and the 1970s, staying the longest with São Bento, Remo and Comercial–MS.

== Club career ==
Beginning within Estrada Sorocabana, he moved to São Bento in 1967 where he remained for several seasons. He received his first loan for São Paulo during the 1968 season though this stint would end up being a bust, not even lasting the 3 month period he was granted due to being annoyed of never being used even when a member of the Starting XI was injured with club manager Sylvio Pirillo choosing improvised defenders over him.

He gained national recognition upon his next loan to Paraense club Remo under manager João Avelino for the 1972 Campeonato Brasileiro Série A. Within the Azulinos, he was known as one of the best defenders of the top-flight of Brazilian football, winning the defender category of the 1972 Bola de Ouro from Placar magazine as well as becoming the first player from a Northern Brazilian club to receive the award. He remained the only player with this honor until Edson Cimento would join him in the 1977 edition with the two remaining the only Northern Brazilian players to win by the 2010s. À altura da década de 2010, ambos seguiam sendo os únicos do futebol nortista que ganharam a premiação. Despite criticism by João Saldanha five years later regarding the decision, he was recognized as being the player that Nelinho would sub in for prior to the latter's stardom and success.. Aranha would only fall out of the Starting XI for the club due to an injury throughout the final matchdays, allowing for Nelinho to gain opportunities in the match against Cruzeiro. Due to Remo facing internal implosion following the season, both Aranha and Nelinho left.[10] His success within Remo led to São Bento appraising him a high value within the transfer market, being sought by Flamengo, Botafogo and Athletico Paranaense. He later settled within Atlético Mineiro for their 1973 season though he failed to establish himself within the club and briefly returned to Remo for one match at for the annual Re-Pa that ended in a 1–1 draw.

During the 1975 season, he received a free pass for Comercial–MS. By the end of September of that year, he was considered the third best right-back of the Brasileirão for the annual Bola de Ouro. The following season saw him play for Sport Recife for the 1976 Campeonato Pernambucano though unlike the previous season, they wouldn't win the title. He spent his final season with Comercial–MS again until his retirement in 1977.

== Later life ==
Following his retirement, he served as an electrical technician. He also later married and is currently the father of four children though since the 2000s, he has had partial paralysis in the left side of his body due to a stroke.

In 2020, an official election held by Remo inquired fans of the club's best players. Aranha was later selected as the second-best right-back of club history, only preceding Marquinhos Belém who was part of the winning squad for the 2005 Campeonato Brasileiro Série C.
