= Deodoro (footballer) =

Brazilian footballer (1949–2024)

Personal information
- Full name: Deodoro José de Almeida Leite
- Date of birth: 7 June 1949
- Place of birth: Piracicaba, São Paulo, Brazil
- Date of death: 25 January 2024 (aged 74)
- Place of death: São Paulo, Brazil
- Position: Defender

Youth career
- 1968: Portuguesa

Senior career*
Years	Team	Apps	(Gls)
1969–1972	Portuguesa	83	(2)
1973–1974	Juventus-SP		
1975	Vasco da Gama		
1976	Guarani		
1977–1978	Coritiba		
1979–1984	Juventus-SP		
1985	Nacional		
1985	Garça		

Managerial career
- 1991: São Caetano
- * Club domestic league appearances and goals

Deodoro José de Almeida Leite (7 June 1949 – 25 January 2024), simply known as Deodoro, was a Brazilian professional footballer who played as a defender.

== Playing career ==
Deodoro began his career in the youth sectors at Portuguesa. In 1969, he was promoted to the professional ranks as fullback, being Zé Maria substitute. He played in 83 matches and scored 2 goals for the club. He then had spells at Juventus, Guarani, Vasco and Coritiba, where he won the Silver Ball in 1978, playing as central defender. Deodoro returned to Juventus once again in 1979, and was part of the squad that won the 1983 Taça de Prata, considered the most important title in the club's history.

== Managerial career ==
Deodoro was São Caetano manager in 1991, from June to December.

== Death ==
Deodoro suffered a stroke on 23 January 2024. He died two days later, on 25 January, at the age of 74.

== Honours ==
Vasco

- Taça Danilo Leal Carneiro: 1975

Juventus-SP

- Asahi International Soccer Tournament: 1974
- Campeonato Brasileiro Série B: 1983

Individual

- 1978 Bola de Prata
