= Bola de Ouro =

Award

The Bola de Ouro (Golden Ball) is an annual award given each year, since 1973, by Brazilian sports magazine Placar to the best player in the Campeonato Brasileiro. A group of sports journalists watch every match of the competition and rate players 1 to 10 based on their performance. At the end of the season, the players with the best average rating in each position are awarded the Bola de Prata (Silver Ball), and the player with the best overall average rating is the recipient of the Bola de Ouro.

The awards were first given in 1973, but since the 1970 Campeonato Brasileiro Série A the magazine had started to evaluate players. The 1971 winner, Dirceu Lopes, received the award in the 2013 edition. Since the 1975 edition Placar also started to award a Bola de Prata to the top goalscorer of the competition. The players with most Bola de Ouro wins are Falcão, Toninho Cerezo, Zico, Roberto Costa and César Sampaio, each of them having won the award twice.

Both Pelé and Neymar were declared hors concours, not being allowed to participate due to being unrivaled by any other player. Pelé was declared as such in 1970, receiving then a Golden Ball in a year with no other Golden Ball awarded, although Francisco Reyes would have been that year's recipient. Neymar was awarded his first Golden Ball in 2011 but later declared unrivaled, not being able to repeat his feat. They remain the only players with such honor.

From 2016 onwards, the award was organized by ESPN.

== Winners ==
| ^ | Denotes players who are still active |
| * | Hors concours |
| † | Denotes player whose team won the Campeonato Brasileiro that year |
| Player (X) | Denotes the number of times the player had been named Bola de Ouro at that time |
| **Player** **(in bold text)** | Indicates the player who won the Prêmio Craque do Brasileirão in the same year^{[a]} |

| Season | Player | Position | Nationality | Club |
|---|---|---|---|---|
| 1970 | Pelé* | Attacking midfielder | (Brazil) | Santos |
| 1971 | Dirceu Lopes | Attacking midfielder | (Brazil) | Cruzeiro |
| 1973 | Agustín Cejas | Goalkeeper | (Argentina) | Santos |
| 1973 | Atilio Ancheta | Centre-back | (Uruguay) | Grêmio |
| 1974 | Zico | Attacking midfielder | (Brazil) | Flamengo |
| 1975 | Waldir Peres | Goalkeeper | (Brazil) | São Paulo |
| 1976 † | Elías Figueroa | Centre-back | (Chile) | Internacional |
| 1977 | Toninho Cerezo | Central midfielder | (Brazil) | Atlético Mineiro |
| 1978 | Falcão | Central midfielder | (Brazil) | Internacional |
| 1979 † | Falcão (2) | Central midfielder | (Brazil) | Internacional |
| 1980 | Toninho Cerezo (2) | Central midfielder | (Brazil) | Atlético Mineiro |
| 1981 † | Paulo Isidoro | Attacking midfielder | (Brazil) | Grêmio |
| 1982 † | Zico (2) | Attacking midfielder | (Brazil) | Flamengo |
| 1983 | Roberto Costa | Goalkeeper | (Brazil) | Athletico Paranaense |
| 1984 | Roberto Costa (2) | Goalkeeper | (Brazil) | Vasco da Gama |
| 1985 | Marinho | Right winger | (Brazil) | Bangu |
| 1986 † | Careca | Striker | (Brazil) | São Paulo |
| 1987 | Renato Gaúcho | Right winger | (Brazil) | Flamengo |
| 1988 | Cláudio Taffarel | Goalkeeper | (Brazil) | Internacional |
| 1989 | Ricardo Rocha | Centre-back | (Brazil) | São Paulo |
| 1990 | César Sampaio | Defensive midfielder | (Brazil) | Santos |
| 1991 | Mauro Silva | Defensive midfielder | (Brazil) | Bragantino |
| 1992 † | Júnior | Central midfielder | (Brazil) | Flamengo |
| 1993 † | César Sampaio (2) | Defensive midfielder | (Brazil) | Palmeiras |
| 1994 | Amoroso | Second striker | (Brazil) | Guarani |
| 1995 | Giovanni | Second striker | (Brazil) | Santos |
| 1996 | Djalminha | Attacking midfielder | (Brazil) | Palmeiras |
| 1997 † | Edmundo | Second striker | (Brazil) | Vasco da Gama |
| 1998 † | Edílson | Second striker | (Brazil) | Corinthians |
| 1999 † | Marcelinho Carioca | Attacking midfielder | (Brazil) | Corinthians |
| 2000 † | Romário | Striker | (Brazil) | Vasco da Gama |
| 2001 † | Alex Mineiro | Striker | (Brazil) | Athletico Paranaense |
| 2002 | Kaká | Attacking midfielder | (Brazil) | São Paulo |
| 2003 † | Alex | Attacking midfielder | (Brazil) | Cruzeiro |
| 2004 † | Robinho | Second striker | (Brazil) | Santos |
| 2005 † | **Carlos Tevez** | Second striker | (Argentina) | Corinthians |
| 2006 | Lucas Leiva | Defensive midfielder | (Brazil) | Grêmio |
| 2007 | Thiago Neves | Attacking midfielder | (Brazil) | Fluminense |
| 2008 † | Rogério Ceni | Goalkeeper | (Brazil) | São Paulo |
| 2009 † | Adriano | Striker | (Brazil) | Flamengo |
| 2010 † | **Darío Conca** | Attacking midfielder | (Argentina) | Fluminense |
| 2011 | **Neymar**^ | Second striker | (Brazil) | Santos |
| 2012 | Neymar*^ (2) | Second striker | (Brazil) | Santos |
| 2012 | Ronaldinho | Attacking midfielder | (Brazil) | Flamengo, Atlético Mineiro |
| 2013 † | **Éverton Ribeiro**^ | Right midfielder | (Brazil) | Cruzeiro |
| 2014 † | Ricardo Goulart | Attacking midfielder | (Brazil) | Cruzeiro |
| 2015 † | **Renato Augusto**^ | Central midfielder | (Brazil) | Corinthians |
| 2016 † | **Gabriel Jesus**^ | Striker | (Brazil) | Palmeiras |
| 2017 † | **Jô** | Striker | (Brazil) | Corinthians |
| 2018 † | **Dudu**^ | Winger | (Brazil) | Palmeiras |
| 2019 † | Gabriel Barbosa^ | Striker | (Brazil) | Flamengo |
| 2020 | **Claudinho**^ | Attacking midfielder | (Brazil) | Red Bull Bragantino |
| 2021 † | **Hulk**^ | Forward | (Brazil) | Atlético Mineiro |
| 2022 † | **Gustavo Scarpa**^ | Attacking midfielder | (Brazil) | Palmeiras |
| 2023 | Luis Suárez^ | Forward | (Uruguay) | Grêmio |
| 2024 | Estêvão Willian^ | Winger | (Brazil) | Palmeiras |
| 2025 † | **Giorgian de Arrascaeta**^ | Attacking midfielder | (Uruguay) | Flamengo |

The award was not originally given from 1970 to 1972, but the following players had the best evaluation:

| Season | Player | Position | Nationality | Club | Note |
|---|---|---|---|---|---|
| 1970 | Francisco Reyes | Defensive midfielder | (Paraguay) | Flamengo | |
| 1971 | Dirceu Lopes | Attacking midfielder | (Brazil) | Cruzeiro | Award given in 2013 |
| 1972 | Elías Figueroa | Centre-back | (Chile) | Internacional | |

=== Players with multiple awards ===
| ^ | Denotes players who are still active |
| * | Includes one Hors concours award |

| Awards | Player | Team(s) | Years |
|---|---|---|---|
| 2 | Zico | Flamengo | 1974, 1982 |
| 2 | Toninho Cerezo | Atlético Mineiro | 1977, 1980 |
| 2 | Falcão | Internacional | 1978, 1979 |
| 2 | Roberto Costa | Athletico Paranaense, Vasco da Gama | 1983, 1984 |
| 2 | César Sampaio | Santos, Palmeiras | 1990, 1993 |
| 2 | Neymar*^ | Santos | 2011, 2012 |

=== Wins by club ===
| Club | Wins |
|---|---|
| Flamengo | 7 |
| Palmeiras | 6 |
| Corinthians | 5 |
| Santos | 5 |
| São Paulo | 5 |
| Atlético Mineiro | 4 |
| Cruzeiro | 4 |
| Grêmio | 4 |
| Internacional | 4 |
| Vasco da Gama | 3 |
| Athletico Paranaense | 2 |
| Fluminense | 2 |
| Bangu | 1 |
| Bragantino | 1 |
| Guarani | 1 |
| Red Bull Bragantino | 1 |

== Bola de Prata ==
Bola de Prata (Silver Ball) is given to the best players in their respective position (forward, defender, etc.) on the same points system. Therefore, the Brazilian team of the year is created. In 1973, Placar introduced the "Bola de Ouro", given to the best player of the league, according to Placar itself. In this year, two players shared the Bola de Ouro, this situation never occurred again. Players marked bold won the "Bola de Ouro" in that respective year.

| Season | Category | | | |
| Season | Goalkeeper | Defenders | Midfielders | Forwards |
|---|---|---|---|---|
| 1970 | (Brazil) Picasso (Bahia) | (Brazil) Humberto (Atlético Mineiro) (Brazil) Brito (Cruzeiro) (Paraguay) Francisco Reyes (Flamengo) (Brazil) Everaldo (Grêmio) | (Brazil) Zanata (Flamengo) (Brazil) Dirceu Lopes (Cruzeiro) (Brazil) Samarone (Fluminense) | (Brazil) Vaguinho (Atlético Mineiro) (Brazil) Tostão (Cruzeiro) (Brazil) Caju (Botafogo) |
| 1971 | (Argentina) Edgardo Andrada (Vasco da Gama) | (Brazil) Humberto (Atlético Mineiro) (Brazil) Nélson Pescuma (Coritiba) (Brazil) Vantuir (Atlético Mineiro) (Brazil) Carlindo (Ceará) | (Brazil) Wanderley (Atlético Mineiro) (Brazil) Dirceu Lopes (Palmeiras) (Brazil) Roberto Rivellino (Corinthians) | (Brazil) Antonio Carlos (America-RJ) (Brazil) Tião Abatiá (Coritiba) (Brazil) Edu (Santos) |
| 1972 | (Brazil) Émerson Leão (Palmeiras) | (Brazil) Aranha (Remo) (Chile) Elías Figueroa (Internacional) (Brazil) Beto Bacamarte (Grêmio) (Brazil) Marinho Chagas (Botafogo) | (Brazil) Piazza (Cruzeiro) (Brazil) Ademir da Guia (Palmeiras) (Brazil) Zé Roberto (Coritiba) | (Brazil) Osni (Vitória) (Brazil) Caju (Flamengo) (Brazil) Alberi (ABC) |
| 1973 | (Argentina) Agustín Cejas (Santos) | (Brazil) Zé Maria (Corinthians) (Uruguay) Atilio Ancheta (Grêmio) (Brazil) Alfredo (Palmeiras) (Brazil) Marinho Chagas (Botafogo) | (Brazil) Pedro Omar (América-MG) (Brazil) Dirceu Lopes (Cruzeiro) (Uruguay) Pedro Rocha (São Paulo) | (Brazil) Zequinha (Botafogo) (Brazil) Mirandinha (São Paulo) (Brazil) Mário Sérgio (Vitória) |
| 1974 | (Brazil) Joel Mendes (Vitória) | (Brazil) Louro (Fortaleza) (Chile) Elías Figueroa (Internacional) (Brazil) Miguel (Vasco da Gama) (Brazil) Wladimir (Corinthians) | (Brazil) Dudu (Palmeiras) (Brazil) Zico (Flamengo) (Brazil) Mário Sérgio (Vitória) | (Brazil) Osni (Vitória) (Brazil) Luisinho Lemos (America-RJ) (Brazil) Lula (Internacional) |
| 1975 | (Brazil) Waldir Peres (São Paulo) | (Brazil) Nelinho (Cruzeiro) (Chile) Elías Figueroa (Internacional) (Brazil) Amaral (Guarani) (Brazil) Marco Antônio (Fluminense) | (Brazil) Paulo César Carpegiani (Internacional) (Brazil) Paulo Roberto Falcão (Internacional) (Brazil) Zico (Flamengo) | (Brazil) Gil (Fluminense) (Brazil) Palhinha (Cruzeiro) (Brazil) Ziza (Guarani) |
| 1976 | (Brazil) Manga (Internacional) | (Brazil) Perivaldo (Bahia) (Chile) Elías Figueroa (Internacional) (Brazil) Beto Fuscão (Grêmio) (Brazil) Wladimir (Corinthians) | (Brazil) Toninho Cerezo (Atlético Mineiro) (Brazil) Paulo Isidoro (Atlético Mineiro) (Brazil) Caju (Fluminense) | (Brazil) Valdomiro (Internacional) (Argentina) Narciso Doval (Flamengo) (Brazil) Lula (Fluminense) |
| 1977 | (Brazil) Edson (Remo) | (Brazil) Zé Maria (Corinthians) (Brazil) Oscar (Ponte Preta) (Brazil) Polozzi (Ponte Preta) (Brazil) Marco Antônio (Vasco da Gama) | (Brazil) Toninho Cerezo (Atlético Mineiro) (Brazil) Adílio (Flamengo) (Brazil) Zico (Flamengo) | (Brazil) Tarciso (Grêmio) (Brazil) Reinaldo (Atlético Mineiro) (Brazil) Caju (Botafogo) |
| 1978 | (Brazil) Manga (Operário-MS) | (Brazil) Rosemiro (Palmeiras) (Brazil) Rondinelli (Flamengo) (Brazil) Deodoro (Coritiba) (Brazil) Odirlei (Ponte Preta) | (Brazil) Caçapava (Internacional) (Brazil) Adílio (Flamengo) (Brazil) Paulo Roberto Falcão (Internacional) | (Brazil) Tarciso (Grêmio) (Brazil) Paulinho (Vasco da Gama) (Brazil) Jésum (Bahia) |
| 1979 | (Brazil) João Leite (Atlético Mineiro) | (Brazil) Nelinho (Cruzeiro) (Brazil) Osmar (Atlético Mineiro) (Brazil) Mauro Galvão (Internacional) (Brazil) Pedrinho (Palmeiras) | (Brazil) Pires (Palmeiras) (Brazil) Jorge Mendonça (Palmeiras) (Brazil) Paulo Roberto Falcão (Internacional) | (Brazil) Jorginho (Palmeiras) (Brazil) Joãozinho (Cruzeiro) (Brazil) Roberto Dinamite (Vasco da Gama) |
| 1980 | (Brazil) Carlos (Ponte Preta) | (Brazil) Nelinho (Cruzeiro) (Brazil) Joãozinho Rosa (Santos) (Brazil) Luizinho (Atlético Mineiro) (Brazil) Júnior (Flamengo) | (Brazil) Batista (Internacional) (Brazil) Toninho Cerezo (Atlético Mineiro) (Brazil) Sócrates (Corinthians) | (Brazil) Botelho (Desportiva-ES) (Brazil) Baltazar (Grêmio) (Brazil) Mário Sérgio (Internacional) |
| 1981 | (Paraguay) José de La Cruz Benítez (Internacional) | (Brazil) Perivaldo (Botafogo) (Brazil) Moisés (Bangu) (Uruguay) Darío Pereyra (São Paulo) (Brazil) Marinho Chagas (São Paulo) | (Brazil) Zé Mário (Ponte Preta) (Brazil) Paulo Isidoro (Grêmio) (Brazil) Eloi (Inter de Limeira) (Brazil) Mário Sérgio (Internacional) | (Brazil) Paulo César (São Paulo) (Brazil) Roberto Dinamite (Vasco da Gama) |
| 1982 | (Brazil) Carlos (Ponte Preta) | (Brazil) Leandro (Flamengo) (Brazil) Juninho Fonseca (Ponte Preta) (Brazil) Edinho (Fluminense) (Brazil) Wladimir (Corinthians) | (Brazil) Batista (Grêmio) (Brazil) Biro-Biro (Corinthians) (Brazil) Pita (Santos) (Brazil) Zico (Flamengo) | (Brazil) Lúcio (Guarani) (Brazil) Careca (Guarani) |
| 1983 | (Brazil) Roberto Costa (Atlético Paranaense) | (Brazil) Nelinho (Atlético Mineiro) (Brazil) Márcio Rossini (Santos) (Uruguay) Darío Pereyra (São Paulo) (Brazil) Júnior (Flamengo) | (Brazil) Dema (Santos) (Brazil) Paulo Isidoro (Santos) (Brazil) Pita (Santos) | (Brazil) Jorginho Putinatti (Palmeiras) (Brazil) Reinaldo (Atlético Mineiro) (Brazil) Éder (Atlético Mineiro) |
| 1984 | (Brazil) Roberto Costa (Vasco da Gama) | (Brazil) Édson (Corinthians) (Brazil) Ivan (Vasco da Gama) (Uruguay) Hugo de León (Grêmio) (Brazil) Júnior (Flamengo) | (Brazil) Pires (Vasco da Gama) (Paraguay) Romerito (Fluminense) (Brazil) Assis (Fluminense) | (Brazil) Renato Gaúcho (Grêmio) (Brazil) Tato (Fluminense) (Brazil) Roberto Dinamite (Vasco da Gama) |
| 1985 | (Brazil) Rafael (Coritiba) | (Brazil) Luís Carlos Winck (Internacional) (Brazil) Leandro (Flamengo) (Brazil) Mauro Galvão (Internacional) (Brazil) Baby (Bangu) | (Brazil) Alemão (Botafogo) (Brazil) Dema (Santos) (Uruguay) Rubén Paz (Internacional) | (Brazil) Marinho (Bangu) (Brazil) Careca (São Paulo) (Brazil) Ado (Bangu) |
| 1986 | (Brazil) Gilmar (São Paulo) | (Brazil) Alfinete (Joinville) (Uruguay) Darío Pereyra (São Paulo) (Brazil) Ricardo Rocha (Guarani) (Brazil) Nelsinho (São Paulo) | (Brazil) Bernardo (São Paulo) (Brazil) Pita (São Paulo) (Brazil) Jorginho (Portuguesa) | (Brazil) Sérgio Araújo (Atlético Mineiro) (Brazil) Careca (São Paulo) (Brazil) João Paulo (Guarani) |
| 1987 | (Brazil) Cláudio Taffarel (Internacional) | (Brazil) Luís Carlos Winck (Internacional) (Brazil) Aloísio (Internacional) (Brazil) Luizinho (Atlético Mineiro) (Brazil) Mazinho (Vasco da Gama) | (Brazil) Norberto (Internacional) (Brazil) Milton (Coritiba) (Brazil) Zico (Flamengo) | (Brazil) Renato (Atlético Mineiro) (Brazil) Berg (Botafogo) (Brazil) Renato Gaúcho (Flamengo) |
| 1988 | (Brazil) Cláudio Taffarel (Internacional) | (Brazil) Alfinete (Grêmio) (Uruguay) Óscar Aguirregaray (Internacional) (Brazil) Pereira (Bahia) (Brazil) Mazinho (Vasco da Gama) | (Brazil) Paulo Rodrigues (Bahia) (Brazil) Adílson Heleno (Criciúma) (Brazil) Zinho (Flamengo) | (Brazil) Bobô (Bahia) (Brazil) Vivinho (Vasco da Gama) (Brazil) Nílson (Internacional) |
| 1989 | (Brazil) Gilmar (São Paulo) | (Brazil) Balu (Cruzeiro) (Brazil) Paulo Sérgio (Atlético Mineiro) (Brazil) Ricardo Rocha (São Paulo) (Brazil) Mazinho (Vasco da Gama) | (Brazil) Elzo (Palmeiras) (Brazil) Raí (São Paulo) (Brazil) Bismarck (Vasco da Gama) | (Brazil) Bobô (São Paulo) (Brazil) Túlio (Goiás) (Brazil) Bizu (Náutico) |
| 1990 | (Brazil) Ronaldo (Corinthians) | (Brazil) Gil Baiano (Bragantino) (Brazil) Marcelo Djian (Corinthians) (Brazil) Adílson (Cruzeiro) (Brazil) Biro-Biro (Bragantino) | (Brazil) César Sampaio (Santos) (Brazil) Mazinho Oliveira (Bragantino) (Brazil) Luiz Fernando (Internacional) | (Brazil) Renato Gaúcho (Flamengo) (Brazil) Careca Bianchesi (Palmeiras) (Brazil) Tiba (Bragantino) |
| 1991 | (Brazil) Marcelo (Bragantino) | (Brazil) Gil Baiano (Bragantino) (Brazil) Márcio Santos (Internacional) (Brazil) Ricardo Rocha (São Paulo) (Brazil) Leonardo (São Paulo) | (Brazil) Mauro Silva (Bragantino) (Brazil) Júnior (Flamengo) (Brazil) Mazinho Oliveira (Bragantino) (Brazil) Neto (Corinthians) | (Brazil) Careca Bianchesi (Palmeiras) (Brazil) Túlio (Goiás) |
| 1992 | (Brazil) Gilberto (Sport do Recife) | (Brazil) Cafu (São Paulo) (Brazil) Aílton (Sport do Recife) (Brazil) Alexandre Torres (Vasco da Gama) (Brazil) Válber (Botafogo) | (Brazil) Mauro Silva (Bragantino) (Brazil) Júnior (Flamengo) (Brazil) Nélio (Flamengo) (Brazil) Zinho (Flamengo) | (Brazil) Renato Gaúcho (Botafogo) (Brazil) Bebeto (Vasco da Gama) |
| 1993 | (Brazil) Dida (Vitória) | (Brazil) Cafu (São Paulo) (Brazil) Antônio Carlos (Palmeiras) (Brazil) Ricardo Rocha (Santos) (Brazil) Roberto Carlos (Palmeiras) | (Brazil) César Sampaio (Palmeiras) (Brazil) Roberto Cavalo (Vitória) (Brazil) Djalminha (Palmeiras) (Brazil) Rivaldo (Corinthians) | (Brazil) Edmundo (Palmeiras) (Brazil) Alex Alves (Vitória) |
| 1994 | (Brazil) Ronaldo (Corinthians) | (Brazil) Pavão (São Paulo) (Brazil) Jorge Luiz (Guarani) (Brazil) Cléber (Palmeiras) (Brazil) Roberto Carlos (Palmeiras) | (Brazil) Zé Elias (Corinthians) (Brazil) Marcelinho Carioca (Corinthians) (Brazil) Zinho (Palmeiras) (Brazil) Rivaldo (Palmeiras) | (Brazil) Luizão (Guarani) (Brazil) Amoroso (Guarani) |
| 1995 | (Brazil) Wágner (Botafogo) | (Brazil) Zé Maria (Portuguesa) (Brazil) Andrei (Juventude) (Paraguay) Carlos Gamarra (Internacional) (Brazil) Marcos Adriano (Santos) | (Brazil) Leandro Ávila (Santos) (Brazil) Jamelli (Santos) (Brazil) Giovanni (Santos) | (Brazil) Renato Gaúcho (Fluminense) (Brazil) Túlio (Botafogo) (Brazil) Donizete (Botafogo) |
| 1996 | (Brazil) Dida (Cruzeiro) | (Brazil) Alberto (Atlético Paranaense) (Brazil) Adílson (Grêmio) (Paraguay) Carlos Gamarra (Internacional) (Brazil) Zé Roberto (Portuguesa) | (Brazil) Ricardinho (Cruzeiro) (Brazil) Luís Carlos Goiano (Grêmio) (Brazil) Rodrigo Fabri (Portuguesa) (Brazil) Djalminha (Palmeiras) | (Brazil) Paulo Nunes (Grêmio) (Brazil) Renaldo (Atlético Mineiro) |
| 1997 | (Brazil) Carlos Germano (Vasco da Gama) | (Brazil) Zé Carlos (São Paulo) (Brazil) Júnior Baiano (Flamengo) (Brazil) Mauro Galvão (Vasco da Gama) (Brazil) Dedê (Atlético Mineiro) | (Brazil) Fernando (Internacional) (Brazil) Doriva (Atlético Mineiro) (Brazil) Rodrigo Fabri (Portuguesa) (Brazil) Zinho (Palmeiras) | (Brazil) Edmundo (Vasco da Gama) (Brazil) Müller (Santos) |
| 1998 | (Brazil) Dida (Cruzeiro) | (Paraguay) Francisco Arce (Palmeiras) (Brazil) Marcelo Djian (Cruzeiro) (Paraguay) Carlos Gamarra (Corinthians) (Brazil) Júnior (Palmeiras) | (Brazil) Vampeta (Corinthians) (Brazil) Narciso (Santos) (Brazil) Jackson (Sport do Recife) (Brazil) Valdo (Cruzeiro) | (Brazil) Fábio Júnior (Cruzeiro) (Brazil) Edílson (Corinthians) |
| 1999 | (Brazil) Dida (Corinthians) | (Brazil) Bruno (Atlético Mineiro) (Brazil) Cláudio Caçapa (Atlético Mineiro) (Brazil) Roque Júnior (Palmeiras) (Brazil) Leandro (Vitória) | (Brazil) Vampeta (Corinthians) (Colombia) Freddy Rincón (Corinthians) (Brazil) Juliano Belletti (Atlético Mineiro) (Brazil) Marcelinho Carioca (Corinthians) | (Brazil) Guilherme (Atlético Mineiro) (Brazil) Marques (Atlético Mineiro) |
| 2000 | (Brazil) Rogério Ceni (São Paulo) | (Paraguay) Francisco Arce (Palmeiras) (Brazil) Lúcio (Internacional) (Brazil) Cris (Cruzeiro) (Argentina) Juan Pablo Sorín (Cruzeiro) | (Brazil) Mineiro (Ponte Preta) (Brazil) Ricardinho (Cruzeiro) (Brazil) Juninho Pernambucano (Vasco da Gama) (Brazil) Juninho Paulista (Vasco da Gama) | (Brazil) Ronaldinho (Grêmio) (Brazil) Romário (Vasco da Gama) |
| 2001 | (Brazil) Emerson (Bahia) | (Paraguay) Francisco Arce (Palmeiras) (Brazil) Daniel (São Caetano) (Brazil) Gustavo (Atlético Paranaense) (Brazil) Léo (Santos) | (Brazil) Simão (São Caetano) (Brazil) Preto Casagrande (Bahia) (Brazil) Kléberson (Atlético Paranaense) (Brazil) Roger (Fluminense) | (Brazil) Marques (Atlético Mineiro) (Brazil) Alex Mineiro (Atlético Paranaense) |
| 2002 | (Brazil) Diego (Juventude) | (Brazil) Mancini (Atlético Mineiro) (Brazil) Alex (Santos) (Brazil) Fábio Luciano (Corinthians) (Brazil) Athirson (Flamengo) | (Brazil) Tinga (Grêmio) (Brazil) Fábio Simplício (São Paulo) (Brazil) Ramon (Vasco da Gama) (Brazil) Kaká (São Paulo) | (Brazil) Robinho (Santos) (Brazil) Gil (Corinthians) |
| 2003 | (Brazil) Rogério Ceni (São Paulo) | (Brazil) Maurinho (Cruzeiro) (Brazil) Fabão (Goiás) (Brazil) Alex (Santos) (Brazil) Léo (Santos) | (Brazil) Renato (Santos) (Chile) Claudio Maldonado (Cruzeiro) (Brazil) Marcelinho Carioca (Vasco da Gama) (Brazil) Alex (Cruzeiro) | (Brazil) Luís Fabiano (São Paulo) (Brazil) Grafite (Goiás) |
| 2004 | (Brazil) Rogério Ceni (São Paulo) | (Brazil) Paulo Baier (Goiás) (Brazil) Rodrigo (São Paulo) (Uruguay) Diego Lugano (São Paulo) (Brazil) Léo (Santos) | (Brazil) Mineiro (São Caetano) (Brazil) Magrão (Palmeiras) (Serbia) Dejan Petković (Vasco da Gama) (Brazil) Ricardinho (Santos) | (Brazil) Washington (Atlético Paranaense) (Brazil) Robinho (Santos) |
| 2005 | (Brazil) Fábio Costa (Corinthians) | (Brazil) Cicinho (São Paulo) (Paraguay) Carlos Gamarra (Palmeiras) (Uruguay) Diego Lugano (São Paulo) (Brazil) Jadílson (Goiás) | (Brazil) Mineiro (São Paulo) (Brazil) Marcelo Mattos (Corinthians) (Serbia) Dejan Petković (Fluminense) (Brazil) Juninho Paulista (Palmeiras) | (Argentina) Carlos Tevez (Corinthians) (Brazil) Rafael Sóbis (Internacional) |
| 2006 | (Brazil) Rogério Ceni (São Paulo) | (Brazil) Ilsinho (Palmeiras, São Paulo) (Brazil) Fabão (São Paulo) (Brazil) Índio (Internacional) (Brazil) Kléber (Santos) | (Brazil) Mineiro (São Paulo) (Brazil) Lucas Leiva (Grêmio) (Brazil) Zé Roberto (Botafogo) (Brazil) Wágner (Cruzeiro) | (Brazil) Aloísio (São Paulo) (Brazil) Fernandão (Internacional) |
| 2007 | (Brazil) Rogério Ceni (São Paulo) | (Brazil) Léo Moura (Flamengo) (Brazil) Breno (São Paulo) (Brazil) Thiago Silva (Fluminense) (Brazil) Kléber (Santos) | (Brazil) Hernanes (São Paulo) (Brazil) Richarlyson (São Paulo) (Brazil) Thiago Neves (Fluminense) (Chile) Jorge Valdivia (Palmeiras) | (Brazil) Leandro Amaral (Vasco da Gama) (Uruguay) Alberto Acosta (Náutico) |
| 2008 | (Brazil) Rogério Ceni (São Paulo) | (Brazil) Vítor (Goiás) (Brazil) André Dias (São Paulo) (Brazil) Miranda (São Paulo) (Brazil) Juan (Flamengo) | (Brazil) Ramires (Cruzeiro) (Brazil) Hernanes (São Paulo) (Brazil) Tcheco (Grêmio) (Brazil) Wágner (Cruzeiro) | (Brazil) Borges (São Paulo) (Brazil) Nilmar (Internacional) |
| 2009 | (Brazil) Victor (Grêmio) | (Brazil) Jonathan (Cruzeiro) (Brazil) André Dias (São Paulo) (Brazil) Miranda (São Paulo) (Brazil) Kléber (Internacional) | (Brazil) Pierre (Palmeiras) (Argentina) Pablo Guiñazú (Internacional) (Serbia) Dejan Petković (Flamengo) (Brazil) Marcelinho Paraíba (Coritiba) | (Brazil) Diego Tardelli (Atlético Mineiro) (Brazil) Adriano (Flamengo) |
| 2010 | (Brazil) Fábio (Cruzeiro) | (Brazil) Mariano (Fluminense) (Brazil) Chicão (Corinthians) (Brazil) Alex Silva (São Paulo) (Brazil) Roberto Carlos (Corinthians) | (Brazil) Elias (Corinthians) (Brazil) Jucilei (Corinthians) (Argentina) Walter Montillo (Cruzeiro) (Argentina) Darío Conca (Fluminense) | (Brazil) Jonas (Grêmio) (Brazil) Neymar (Santos) |
| 2011 | (Brazil) Fernando Prass (Vasco da Gama) | (Brazil) Mário Fernandes (Grêmio) (Brazil) Dedé (Vasco da Gama) (Brazil) Paulo André (Corinthians) (Brazil) Juninho (Figueirense) | (Brazil) Paulinho (Corinthians) (Brazil) Marcos Assunção (Palmeiras) (Argentina) Walter Montillo (Cruzeiro) (Brazil) Ronaldinho (Flamengo) | (Brazil) Fred (Fluminense) (Brazil) Neymar (Santos) |
| 2012 | (Brazil) Diego Cavalieri (Fluminense) | (Brazil) Marcos Rocha (Atlético Mineiro) (Brazil) Leonardo Silva (Atlético Mineiro) (Brazil) Réver (Atlético Mineiro) (Brazil) Carlinhos (Fluminense) | (Brazil) Paulinho (Corinthians) (Brazil) Ralf (Corinthians) (Brazil) Ronaldinho (Flamengo, Atlético Mineiro) (Brazil) Zé Roberto (Grêmio) | (Brazil) Fred (Fluminense) (Brazil) Lucas (São Paulo) |
| 2013 | (Brazil) Fábio (Cruzeiro) | (Brazil) Mayke (Cruzeiro) (Brazil) Dedé (Cruzeiro) (Brazil) Rodrigo (Goiás) (Brazil) Alex Telles (Grêmio) | (Brazil) Elias (Flamengo) (Brazil) Nílton (Cruzeiro) (Brazil) Éverton Ribeiro (Cruzeiro) (Netherlands) Clarence Seedorf (Botafogo) | (Brazil) Diego Tardelli (Atlético Mineiro) (Brazil) Walter (Goiás) |
| 2014 | (Brazil) Marcelo Grohe (Grêmio) | (Brazil) Marcos Rocha (Atlético Mineiro) (Brazil) Rafael Toloi (São Paulo) (Brazil) Gil (Corinthians) (Brazil) Zé Roberto (Grêmio) | (Chile) Charles Aránguiz (Internacional) (Brazil) Lucas Silva (Cruzeiro) (Brazil) Ricardo Goulart (Cruzeiro) (Brazil) Paulo Henrique Ganso (São Paulo) | (Brazil) Diego Tardelli (Atlético Mineiro) (Peru) Paolo Guerrero (Corinthians) |
| 2015 | (Brazil) Marcelo Grohe (Grêmio) | (Brazil) Rafael Galhardo (Grêmio) (Brazil) Pedro Geromel (Grêmio) (Brazil) Gil (Corinthians) (Brazil) Douglas Santos (Atlético Mineiro) | (Brazil) Elias (Corinthians) (Brazil) Rafael Carioca (Atlético Mineiro) (Brazil) Jádson (Corinthians) (Brazil) Renato Augusto (Corinthians) | (Argentina) Lucas Pratto (Atlético Mineiro) (Brazil) Luan (Grêmio) |
| 2016 | (Brazil) Jailson (Palmeiras) | (Brazil) Jean (Palmeiras) (Brazil) Pedro Geromel (Grêmio) (Brazil) Réver (Flamengo) (Brazil) Fábio Santos (Atlético Mineiro) | (Brazil) Willian Arão (Flamengo) (Brazil) Tchê Tchê (Palmeiras) (Brazil) Moisés (Palmeiras) | (Brazil) Robinho (Atlético Mineiro) (Brazil) Gabriel Jesus (Palmeiras) (Brazil) Dudu (Palmeiras) |
| 2017 | (Brazil) Vanderlei (Santos) | (Brazil) Fagner (Corinthians) (Brazil) Pedro Geromel (Grêmio) (Paraguay) Fabián Balbuena (Corinthians) (Brazil) Thiago Carleto (Coritiba) | (Brazil) Michel (Grêmio) (Brazil) Hernanes (São Paulo) (Brazil) Thiago Neves (Cruzeiro) | (Brazil) Luan (Grêmio) (Brazil) Jô (Corinthians) (Brazil) Dudu (Palmeiras) |
| 2018 | (Brazil) Weverton (Palmeiras) | (Brazil) Mayke (Palmeiras) (Brazil) Pedro Geromel (Grêmio) (Argentina) Víctor Cuesta (Internacional) (Brazil) Renê (Flamengo) | (Brazil) Rodrigo Dourado (Internacional) (Brazil) Bruno Henrique (Palmeiras) (Brazil) Lucas Paquetá (Flamengo) | (Brazil) Everton (Grêmio) (Brazil) Gabriel Barbosa (Santos) (Brazil) Dudu (Palmeiras) |
| 2019 | (Brazil) Diego Alves (Flamengo) | (Brazil) Rafinha (Flamengo) (Brazil) Lucas Veríssimo (Santos) (Paraguay) Gustavo Gómez (Palmeiras) (Brazil) Jorge (Santos) | (Brazil) Willian Arão (Flamengo) (Brazil) Gerson (Flamengo) (Uruguay) Giorgian de Arrascaeta (Flamengo) | (Brazil) Bruno Henrique (Flamengo) (Brazil) Gabriel Barbosa (Flamengo) (Brazil) Dudu (Palmeiras) |
| 2020 | (Brazil) Weverton (Palmeiras) | (Chile) Mauricio Isla (Flamengo) (Paraguay) Gustavo Gómez (Palmeiras) (Paraguay) Júnior Alonso (Atlético Mineiro) (Brazil) Guilherme Arana (Atlético Mineiro) | (Brazil) Edenílson (Internacional) (Brazil) Gerson (Flamengo) (Brazil) Claudinho (Red Bull Bragantino) (Uruguay) Giorgian de Arrascaeta (Flamengo) | (Brazil) Marinho (Santos) (Brazil) Luciano (São Paulo) |
| 2021 | (Brazil) Everson (Atlético Mineiro) | (Brazil) Mariano (Atlético Mineiro) (Paraguay) Júnior Alonso (Atlético Mineiro) (Brazil) Léo Ortiz (Red Bull Bragantino) (Brazil) Guilherme Arana (Atlético Mineiro) | (Brazil) Edenílson (Internacional) (Brazil) Jair (Atlético Mineiro) (Argentina) Nacho Fernández (Atlético Mineiro) (Brazil) Raphael Veiga (Palmeiras) | (Brazil) Hulk (Atlético Mineiro) (Brazil) Artur (Red Bull Bragantino) |
| 2022 | (Brazil) Cássio (Corinthians) | (Brazil) Marcos Rocha (Palmeiras) (Paraguay) Gustavo Gómez (Palmeiras) (Brazil) Murilo (Palmeiras) (Uruguay) Joaquín Piquerez (Palmeiras) | (Brazil) André (Fluminense) (Brazil) Zé Rafael (Palmeiras) (Brazil) Gustavo Scarpa (Palmeiras) (Uruguay) Giorgian de Arrascaeta (Flamengo) | (Brazil) Dudu (Palmeiras) (Argentina) Germán Cano (Fluminense) |
| 2023 | (Brazil) Weverton (Palmeiras) | (Brazil) Mayke (Palmeiras) (Brazil) Murilo (Palmeiras) (Brazil) Adryelson (Botafogo) (Uruguay) Joaquín Piquerez (Palmeiras) | (Paraguay) Mathías Villasanti (Grêmio) (Chile) Erick Pulgar (Flamengo) (Brazil) Raphael Veiga (Palmeiras) (Uruguay) Giorgian de Arrascaeta (Flamengo) | (Uruguay) Luis Suárez (Grêmio) (Brazil) Hulk (Atlético Mineiro) |
| 2024 | (Brazil) John (Botafogo) | (Brazil) William (Cruzeiro) (Angola) Bastos (Botafogo) (Paraguay) Gustavo Gómez (Palmeiras) (Argentina) Alexandro Bernabei (Internacional) | (Brazil) Marlon Freitas (Botafogo) (Argentina) Rodrigo Garro (Corinthians) (Brazil) Alan Patrick (Internacional) (Venezuela) Jefferson Savarino (Botafogo) | (Brazil) Luiz Henrique (Botafogo) (Brazil) Estêvão (Palmeiras) |
| 2025 | (Brazil) Walter (Mirassol) | (Brazil) Paulo Henrique (Vasco da Gama) (Brazil) Fabrício Bruno (Cruzeiro) (Brazil) Léo Pereira (Flamengo) (Brazil) Reinaldo (Mirassol) | (Argentina) Lucas Romero (Cruzeiro) (Uruguay) Giorgian de Arrascaeta (Flamengo) (Brazil) Matheus Pereira (Cruzeiro) | (Brazil) Kaio Jorge (Cruzeiro) (Brazil) Pedro (Flamengo) (Brazil) Vitor Roque (Palmeiras) |

=== Most appearances ===
| | Player | Apps | Years | Club(s) |
|---|---|---|---|---|
| 1 | (Brazil) Rogério Ceni | 6 | 2000, 2003, 2004, 2006, 2007, 2008 | São Paulo |
| 2 | (Brazil) Zico | 5 | 1974, 1975, 1977, 1982, 1987 | Flamengo |
| 2 | (Brazil) Júnior | 5 | 1980, 1983, 1984, 1991, 1992 | Flamengo |
| 2 | (Brazil) Renato Gaúcho | 5 | 1984, 1987, 1990, 1992, 1995 | Grêmio, Flamengo, Botafogo, Fluminense |
| 2 | (Brazil) Dudu | 5 | 2016, 2017, 2018, 2019, 2022 | Palmeiras |
| 2 | (Uruguay) Giorgian de Arrascaeta | 5 | 2019, 2020, 2022, 2023, 2025 | Flamengo |
| 7 | (Brazil) Caju | 4 | 1970, 1972, 1976, 1977 | Botafogo, Flamengo, Fluminense |
| 7 | (Chile) Elías Figueroa | 4 | 1972, 1974, 1975, 1976 | Internacional |
| 7 | (Brazil) Mário Sérgio | 4 | 1973, 1974, 1980, 1981 | Vitória, Internacional |
| 7 | (Brazil) Nelinho | 4 | 1975, 1979, 1980, 1983 | Cruzeiro, Atlético Mineiro |
| 7 | (Brazil) Ricardo Rocha | 4 | 1986, 1989, 1991, 1993 | Guarani, São Paulo, Santos |
| 7 | (Brazil) Zinho | 4 | 1988, 1992, 1994, 1997 | Flamengo, Palmeiras |
| 7 | (Brazil) Dida | 4 | 1993, 1996, 1998, 1999 | Vitória, Cruzeiro, Corinthians |
| 7 | (Paraguay) Carlos Gamarra | 4 | 1995, 1996, 1998, 2005 | Internacional, Corinthians, Palmeiras |
| 7 | (Brazil) Mineiro | 4 | 2000, 2004, 2005, 2006 | Ponte Preta, São Caetano, São Paulo |
| 7 | (Brazil) Pedro Geromel | 4 | 2015, 2016, 2017, 2018 | Grêmio |
| 7 | (Paraguay) Gustavo Gómez | 4 | 2019, 2020, 2022, 2024 | Palmeiras |
| 18 | (Brazil) Marinho Chagas | 3 | 1972, 1973, 1981 | Botafogo, São Paulo |
| 18 | (Brazil) Wladimir | 3 | 1974, 1976, 1982 | Corinthians |
| 18 | (Brazil) Paulo Roberto Falcão | 3 | 1975, 1978, 1979 | Internacional |
| 18 | (Brazil) Toninho Cerezo | 3 | 1976, 1977, 1980 | Atlético Mineiro |
| 18 | (Brazil) Paulo Isidoro | 3 | 1976, 1981, 1983 | Atlético Mineiro, Grêmio, Santos |
| 18 | (Brazil) Roberto Dinamite | 3 | 1979, 1981, 1984 | Vasco da Gama |
| 18 | (Brazil) Mauro Galvão | 3 | 1979, 1985, 1997 | Internacional, Vasco da Gama |
| 18 | (Uruguay) Darío Pereyra | 3 | 1981, 1983, 1986 | São Paulo |
| 18 | (Brazil) Pita | 3 | 1982, 1983, 1986 | Santos, São Paulo |
| 18 | (Brazil) Careca | 3 | 1982, 1985, 1986 | Guarani, São Paulo |
| 18 | (Brazil) Mazinho | 3 | 1987, 1988, 1989 | Vasco da Gama |
| 18 | (Brazil) Túlio | 3 | 1989, 1991, 1995 | Goiás, Botafogo |
| 18 | (Brazil) Roberto Carlos | 3 | 1993, 1994, 2010 | Palmeiras, Corinthians |
| 18 | (Brazil) Marcelinho Carioca | 3 | 1994, 1999, 2003 | Corinthians, Vasco da Gama |
| 18 | (Paraguay) Francisco Arce | 3 | 1998, 2000, 2001 | Palmeiras |
| 18 | (Brazil) Ronaldinho | 3 | 2000, 2011, 2012 | Grêmio, Flamengo, Atlético Mineiro |
| 18 | (Brazil) Léo | 3 | 2001, 2003, 2004 | Santos |
| 18 | (Brazil) Robinho | 3 | 2002, 2004, 2016 | Santos, Atlético Mineiro |
| 18 | (Serbia) Dejan Petković | 3 | 2004, 2005, 2009 | Vasco da Gama, Fluminense, Flamengo |
| 18 | (Brazil) Kléber | 3 | 2006, 2007, 2009 | Santos, Internacional |
| 18 | (Brazil) Hernanes | 3 | 2007, 2008, 2017 | São Paulo |
| 18 | (Brazil) Diego Tardelli | 3 | 2009, 2013, 2014 | Atlético Mineiro |
| 18 | (Brazil) Elias | 3 | 2010, 2013, 2015 | Corinthians, Flamengo |
| 18 | (Brazil) Marcos Rocha | 3 | 2012, 2014, 2022 | Atlético Mineiro, Palmeiras |
| 18 | (Brazil) Mayke | 3 | 2013, 2018, 2023 | Cruzeiro, Palmeiras |
| 18 | (Brazil) Weverton | 3 | 2018, 2020, 2023 | Palmeiras |

== Additional categories ==
In 1975, Placar started giving the Bola de Prata to the league's top scorer.

| Season | Category | | | | |
| Season | O Artilheiro (Top Goalscorer) | A Revelação (Breakthrough Player) | Most Beautiful Goal Author | Best Coach | A Tribute to |
|---|---|---|---|---|---|
| 1970 | Not awarded | Not awarded | Not awarded | Not awarded | (Brazil) Pelé (Santos) (hors concours) |
| 1971 | Not awarded | Not awarded | Not awarded | Not awarded | Not awarded |
| 1972 | Not awarded | Not awarded | Not awarded | Not awarded | Not awarded |
| 1973 | Not awarded | Not awarded | Not awarded | Not awarded | Not awarded |
| 1974 | Not awarded | Not awarded | Not awarded | Not awarded | Not awarded |
| 1975 | (Brazil) Flávio (Internacional) | Not awarded | Not awarded | Not awarded | Not awarded |
| 1976 | (Brazil) Dario (Internacional) | Not awarded | Not awarded | Not awarded | Not awarded |
| 1977 | (Brazil) Reinaldo (Atlético Mineiro) | Not awarded | Not awarded | Not awarded | Not awarded |
| 1978 | (Brazil) Paulinho (Vasco da Gama) | Not awarded | Not awarded | Not awarded | Not awarded |
| 1979 | (Brazil) César (America) (Brazil) Roberto César (Cruzeiro) | Not awarded | Not awarded | Not awarded | Not awarded |
| 1980 | (Brazil) Zico (Flamengo) | Not awarded | Not awarded | Not awarded | Not awarded |
| 1981 | (Brazil) Nunes (Flamengo) | Not awarded | Not awarded | Not awarded | Not awarded |
| 1982 | (Brazil) Zico (Flamengo) | Not awarded | Not awarded | Not awarded | Not awarded |
| 1983 | (Brazil) Serginho (Santos) | Not awarded | Not awarded | Not awarded | Not awarded |
| 1984 | (Brazil) Roberto Dinamite (Vasco da Gama) | Not awarded | Not awarded | Not awarded | Not awarded |
| 1985 | (Brazil) Edmar (Guarani) | Not awarded | Not awarded | Not awarded | Not awarded |
| 1986 | (Brazil) Careca (São Paulo) | Not awarded | Not awarded | Not awarded | Not awarded |
| 1987 | (Brazil) Müller (São Paulo) | Not awarded | Not awarded | Not awarded | Not awarded |
| 1988 | (Brazil) Nílson (Internacional) | Not awarded | Not awarded | Not awarded | Not awarded |
| 1989 | (Brazil) Túlio (Goiás) | Not awarded | Not awarded | Not awarded | Not awarded |
| 1990 | (Brazil) Charles (Bahia) | Not awarded | Not awarded | Not awarded | Not awarded |
| 1991 | (Brazil) Paulinho McLaren (Santos) | Not awarded | Not awarded | Not awarded | Not awarded |
| 1992 | (Brazil) Bebeto (Vasco da Gama) | Not awarded | Not awarded | Not awarded | Not awarded |
| 1993 | (Brazil) Guga (Santos) | Not awarded | Not awarded | Not awarded | Not awarded |
| 1994 | (Brazil) Amoroso (Guarani) (Brazil) Túlio (Botafogo) | Not awarded | Not awarded | Not awarded | Not awarded |
| 1995 | (Brazil) Túlio (Botafogo) | Not awarded | Not awarded | Not awarded | Not awarded |
| 1996 | (Brazil) Paulo Nunes (Grêmio) (Brazil) Renaldo (Atlético Mineiro) | Not awarded | Not awarded | Not awarded | Not awarded |
| 1997 | (Brazil) Edmundo (Vasco da Gama) | Not awarded | Not awarded | Not awarded | Not awarded |
| 1998 | (Brazil) Viola (Santos) | Not awarded | Not awarded | Not awarded | Not awarded |
| 1999 | (Brazil) Guilherme (Atlético Mineiro) | Not awarded | Not awarded | Not awarded | Not awarded |
| 2000 | (Brazil) Dill (Goiás) (Brazil) Magno Alves (Fluminense) (Brazil) Romário (Vasco da Gama) | Not awarded | Not awarded | Not awarded | Not awarded |
| 2001 | (Brazil) Romário (Vasco da Gama) | Not awarded | Not awarded | Not awarded | Not awarded |
| 2002 | (Brazil) Luís Fabiano (São Paulo) (Brazil) Rodrigo Fabri (Grêmio) | Not awarded | Not awarded | Not awarded | Not awarded |
| 2003 | (Brazil) Dimba (Goiás) | Not awarded | Not awarded | Not awarded | Not awarded |
| 2004 | (Brazil) Washington (Athletico Paranaense) | Not awarded | Not awarded | Not awarded | Not awarded |
| 2005 | (Brazil) Romário (Vasco da Gama) | Not awarded | Not awarded | Not awarded | Not awarded |
| 2006 | (Brazil) Souza (Goiás) | Not awarded | Not awarded | Not awarded | Not awarded |
| 2007 | (Brazil) Josiel (Paraná) | Not awarded | Not awarded | Not awarded | Not awarded |
| 2008 | (Brazil) Keirrison (Coritiba) (Brazil) Kléber Pereira (Santos) (Brazil) Washington (Fluminense) | Not awarded | Not awarded | Not awarded | Not awarded |
| 2009 | (Brazil) Adriano (Flamengo) (Brazil) Diego Tardelli (Atlético Mineiro) | Not awarded | Not awarded | Not awarded | Not awarded |
| 2010 | (Brazil) Jonas (Grêmio) | Not awarded | Not awarded | Not awarded | Not awarded |
| 2011 | (Brazil) Borges (Santos) | Not awarded | Not awarded | Not awarded | (Brazil) Sócrates |
| 2012 | (Brazil) Fred (Fluminense) | (Brazil) Bernard (Atlético Mineiro) | Not awarded | Not awarded | (Brazil) Neymar (Santos) (hors concours) |
| 2013 | (Brazil) Éderson (Athletico Paranaense) | Not awarded | Not awarded | Not awarded | Not awarded |
| 2014 | (Brazil) Fred (Fluminense) | Not awarded | Not awarded | Not awarded | Not awarded |
| 2015 | (Brazil) Ricardo Oliveira (Santos) | (Brazil) Gabriel Barbosa (Santos) | Not awarded | Not awarded | (Brazil) Rogério Ceni (São Paulo) (Conjunto da Obra) |
| 2016 | (Brazil) Diego Souza (Sport do Recife) (Brazil) Fred (Atlético Mineiro) (Brazil) William Pottker (Ponte Preta) | Not awarded | (Brazil) Camilo (Botafogo) | (Brazil) Cuca (Palmeiras) | 2016 Chapecoense Copa Sudamericana team (Brazil) Formiga (São José) |
| 2017 | (Brazil) Jô (Corinthians) (Brazil) Henrique Dourado (Fluminense) | Not awarded | (Venezuela) Rómulo Otero (Atlético Mineiro) | (Brazil) Fábio Carille (Corinthians) | 1982 Brazil FIFA World Cup team (Argentina) Soledad Jaimes (Santos) |
| 2018 | (Brazil) Gabriel Barbosa (Santos) | Not awarded | (Brazil) Wescley (Ceará) | (Brazil) Luiz Felipe Scolari (Palmeiras) | (Brazil) Pelé (Brazil) Marta (Bola de Ouro) |
| 2019 | (Brazil) Gabriel Barbosa (Flamengo) | (Brazil) Michael (Goiás) | (Uruguay) Giorgian de Arrascaeta (Flamengo) | (Portugal) Jorge Jesus (Flamengo) | (Brazil) Millene (Corinthians) |
| 2020 | (Brazil) Claudinho (Red Bull Bragantino) (Brazil) Luciano (São Paulo) | (Brazil) Claudinho (Red Bull Bragantino) | (Argentina) Martín Benítez (Vasco da Gama) | (Brazil) Rogério Ceni (Flamengo) | Not awarded |
| 2021 | (Brazil) Hulk (Atlético Mineiro) | (Argentina) Matías Zaracho (Atlético Mineiro) | (Brazil) Andreas Pereira (Flamengo) | (Brazil) Cuca (Atlético Mineiro) | Not awarded |
| 2022 | (Argentina) Germán Cano (Fluminense) | (Brazil) Du Queiroz (Corinthians) | (Brazil) Róger Guedes (Corinthians) | (Portugal) Abel Ferreira (Palmeiras) | Not awarded |
| 2023 | (Brazil) Paulinho (Atlético Mineiro) | (Brazil) Endrick (Palmeiras) | (Brazil) Endrick (Palmeiras) | (Portugal) Abel Ferreira (Palmeiras) | Not awarded |
| 2024 | (Brazil) Alerrandro (Vitória) (Brazil) Yuri Alberto (Coritnhians) | (Brazil) Estêvão (Palmeiras) | (Brazil) Alerrandro (Vitória) | (Portugal) Artur Jorge (Botafogo) | (Brazil) Emerson Ferretti (Troféu Reflexões) |
| 2025 | (Brazil) Kaio Jorge (Cruzeiro) | (Brazil) Allan (Palmeiras) | (Brazil) Pedro (Flamengo) | (Brazil) Rafael Guanaes (Mirassol) | (Portugal) Josué Pesqueira (Coritiba), 2025 Série B best player |

== Foreign players awarded ==
| Player | Nationality | Bola de Ouro | Bola de Prata | Top scorer | Total |
|---|---|---|---|---|---|
| Giorgian de Arrascaeta | Uruguay | 1 | 5 | 0 | 6 |
| Elías Figueroa | Chile | 1 | 4 | 0 | 5 |
| Francisco Arce | Paraguay | 0 | 4 | 0 | 4 |
| Carlos Gamarra | Paraguay | 0 | 4 | 0 | 4 |
| Gustavo Gómez | Paraguay | 0 | 4 | 0 | 4 |
| Darío Pereyra | Uruguay | 0 | 3 | 0 | 3 |
| Dejan Petković | Serbia | 0 | 3 | 0 | 3 |
| Atilio Ancheta | Uruguay | 1 | 1 | 0 | 2 |
| Agustín Cejas | Argentina | 1 | 1 | 0 | 2 |
| Darío Conca | Argentina | 1 | 1 | 0 | 2 |
| Luis Suárez | Uruguay | 1 | 1 | 0 | 2 |
| Carlos Tevez | Argentina | 1 | 1 | 0 | 2 |
| Diego Lugano | Uruguay | 0 | 2 | 0 | 2 |
| Walter Montillo | Argentina | 0 | 2 | 0 | 2 |
| Júnior Alonso | Paraguay | 0 | 2 | 0 | 2 |
| Joaquín Piquerez | Uruguay | 0 | 2 | 0 | 2 |
| Germán Cano | Argentina | 0 | 1 | 1 | 2 |
| Beto Acosta | Uruguay | 0 | 1 | 0 | 1 |
| Óscar Aguirregaray | Uruguay | 0 | 1 | 0 | 1 |
| Edgardo Andrada | Argentina | 0 | 1 | 0 | 1 |
| Charles Aránguiz | Chile | 0 | 1 | 0 | 1 |
| Hugo de León | Uruguay | 0 | 1 | 0 | 1 |
| Narciso Horacio Doval | Argentina | 0 | 1 | 0 | 1 |
| Paolo Guerrero | Peru | 0 | 1 | 0 | 1 |
| Pablo Guiñazú | Argentina | 0 | 1 | 0 | 1 |
| Claudio Maldonado | Chile | 0 | 1 | 0 | 1 |
| Rubén Paz | Uruguay | 0 | 1 | 0 | 1 |
| Lucas Pratto | Argentina | 0 | 1 | 0 | 1 |
| Francisco Reyes | Paraguay | 0 | 1 | 0 | 1 |
| Freddy Rincón | Colombia | 0 | 1 | 0 | 1 |
| Pedro Rocha | Uruguay | 0 | 1 | 0 | 1 |
| Romerito | Paraguay | 0 | 1 | 0 | 1 |
| Clarence Seedorf | Netherlands | 0 | 1 | 0 | 1 |
| Juan Pablo Sorín | Argentina | 0 | 1 | 0 | 1 |
| Jorge Valdivia | Chile | 0 | 1 | 0 | 1 |
| Fabián Balbuena | Paraguay | 0 | 1 | 0 | 1 |
| Víctor Cuesta | Argentina | 0 | 1 | 0 | 1 |
| Mauricio Isla | Chile | 0 | 1 | 0 | 1 |
| Nacho Fernández | Argentina | 0 | 1 | 0 | 1 |
| Mathías Villasanti | Paraguay | 0 | 1 | 0 | 1 |
| Erick Pulgar | Chile | 0 | 1 | 0 | 1 |
| Rodrigo Garro | Argentina | 0 | 1 | 0 | 1 |
| Jefferson Savarino | Venezuela | 0 | 1 | 0 | 1 |
| Bastos | Angola | 0 | 1 | 0 | 1 |
| Alexandro Bernabei | Argentina | 0 | 1 | 0 | 1 |
| Lucas Romero | Argentina | 0 | 1 | 0 | 1 |

== Notes ==
- ^{a} The Prêmio Craque do Brasileirão was first established in 2005.

== Women's football ==
From the 2021 season onwards, the Bola de Ouro (Golden Ball) and Bola de Prata (Silver Ball) awards were given for the best players of the Campeonato Brasileiro de Futebol Feminino Série A1, using the same criteria as of for male players.

=== Bola de Ouro ===
| Season | Player | Position | Nationality | Club |
|---|---|---|---|---|
| 2021 | Bia Zaneratto | Forward | (Brazil) | Palmeiras |
| 2022 | Adriana | Forward | (Brazil) | Corinthians |
| 2023 | Aline Gomes | Forward | (Brazil) | Ferroviária |
| 2024 | Vic Albuquerque | Midfielder | (Brazil) | Corinthians |
| 2025 | Gabi Zanotti | Midfielder | (Brazil) | Corinthians |

=== Bola de Prata ===
| Season | Category | | | |
| Season | Goalkeeper | Defenders | Midfielders | Forwards |
|---|---|---|---|---|
| 2021 | (Brazil) Luciana (Ferroviária) | (Brazil) Bruna Calderan (Palmeiras) (Brazil) Érika (Corinthians) (Argentina) Agustina Barroso (Palmeiras) (Brazil) Yasmim (Corinthians) | (Brazil) Andressinha (Corinthians) (Brazil) Carol Nogueira (São Paulo) (Brazil) Tamires (Corinthians) (Brazil) Vic Albuquerque (Corinthians) | (Brazil) Bia Zaneratto (Palmeiras) (Brazil) Gabi Nunes (Corinthians) |
| 2022 | (Brazil) Letícia Izidoro (Corinthians) | (Brazil) Fe Palermo (São Paulo) (Brazil) Andressa (Corinthians) (Brazil) Bruna Benites (Internacional) (Brazil) Tamires (Corinthians) | (Brazil) Diany (Corinthians) (Brazil) Julia Bianchi (Palmeiras) (Brazil) Gabi Zanotti (Corinthians) (Brazil) Duda Sampaio (Internacional) | (Brazil) Bia Zaneratto (Palmeiras) (Brazil) Adriana (Corinthians) |
| 2023 | (Brazil) Luciana (Ferroviária) | (Brazil) Katiuscia (Corinthians) (Brazil) Day Silva (Ferroviária) (Brazil) Luana Sartório (Ferroviária) (Brazil) Yasmim (Corinthians) | (Brazil) Luana Bertolucci (Corinthians) (Brazil) Brena (Santos) (Brazil) Duda Sampaio (Corinthians) (Brazil) Vic Albuquerque (Corinthians) | (Brazil) Aline Gomes (Ferroviária) (Brazil) Jheniffer (Corinthians) |
| 2024 | (Brazil) Carla (São Paulo) | (Brazil) Katiuscia (Ferroviária) (Colombia) Daniela Arias (Corinthians) (Brazil) Luana Sartório (Ferroviária) (Brazil) Tamires (Corinthians) | (Brazil) Vitória Yaya (Corinthians) (Brazil) Duda Sampaio (Corinthians) (Brazil) Micaelly (Ferroviária) (Brazil) Vic Albuquerque (Corinthians) | (Brazil) Amanda Gutierres (Palmeiras) (Brazil) Gabi Portilho (Corinthians) |
| 2025 | (Brazil) Camila Rodrigues (Cruzeiro) | (Brazil) Gi Fernandes (Corinthians) (Brazil) Mariza (Corinthians) (Brazil) Thaís Ferreira (Corinthians) (Brazil) Gisseli (Cruzeiro) | (Colombia) Lorena Bedoya (Cruzeiro) (Brazil) Gabi Zanotti (Corinthians) (Brazil) Vic Albuquerque (Corinthians) | (Brazil) Amanda Gutierres (Palmeiras) (Brazil) Byanca Brasil (Cruzeiro) (Brazil) Jhonson (Corinthians) |

==== Most appearances ====
| | Player | Apps | Years | Club(s) |
|---|---|---|---|---|
| 1 | (Brazil) Vic Albuquerque | 4 | 2021, 2023, 2024, 2025 | Corinthians |
| 2 | (Brazil) Duda Sampaio | 3 | 2022, 2023, 2024 | Internacional, Corinthians |
| 2 | (Brazil) Tamires | 3 | 2021, 2022, 2024 | Corinthians |
| 4 | (Brazil) Bia Zaneratto | 2 | 2021, 2022 | Palmeiras |
| 4 | (Brazil) Luciana | 2 | 2021, 2023 | Ferroviária |
| 4 | (Brazil) Yasmim | 2 | 2021, 2023 | Corinthians |
| 4 | (Brazil) Luana Sartório | 2 | 2023, 2024 | Ferroviária |
| 4 | (Brazil) Katiuscia | 2 | 2023, 2024 | Corinthians, Ferroviária |
| 4 | (Brazil) Amanda Gutierres | 2 | 2024, 2025 | Palmeiras |
| 4 | (Brazil) Gabi Zanotti | 2 | 2022, 2025 | Corinthians |

=== Additional categories ===
| Season | Category | | | | |
| Season | A Artilheira (Top Goalscorer) | A Revelação (Breakthrough Player) | Most Beautiful Goal Author | Best Coach | A Tribute to |
|---|---|---|---|---|---|
| 2021 | (Brazil) Bia Zaneratto (Palmeiras) | (Brazil) Bruninha (Santos) | (Brazil) Gabi Zanotti (Corinthians) | (Brazil) Arthur Elias (Corinthians) | (Brazil) Formiga |
| 2022 | (Brazil) Cristiane (Santos) | (Brazil) Tarciane (Corinthians) | (Brazil) Patrícia Sochor (Palmeiras) | (Brazil) Arthur Elias (Corinthians) | (Brazil) Grazi (Corinthians) |
| 2023 | (Brazil) Amanda Gutierres (Palmeiras) | (Brazil) Vanessinha (Cruzeiro) | (Brazil) Aline Gomes (Ferroviária) | (Brazil) Arthur Elias (Corinthians) | —N/a |
| 2024 | (Brazil) Amanda Gutierres (Palmeiras) | (Brazil) Letícia Monteiro (Internacional) | (Brazil) Bia Menezes (São Paulo) | (Brazil) Lucas Piccinato (Corinthians) | (Brazil) Marta |
| 2025 | (Brazil) Amanda Gutierres (Palmeiras) | (Brazil) Jhonson (Corinthians) | (Brazil) Manu Balbinot (Real Brasília) | (Brazil) Lucas Piccinato (Corinthians) | —N/a |

== See also ==
- Prêmio Craque do Brasileirão
- Troféu Mesa Redonda
