= Marinho Chagas =

Brazilian footballer

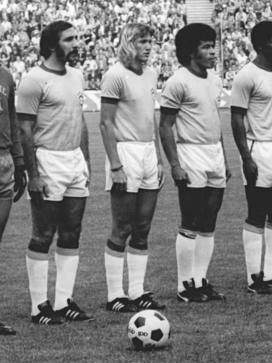
- Chagas (centre) in 1974 FIFA World Cup

Personal information
- Full name: Francisco das Chagas Marinho
- Date of birth: 8 February 1952
- Place of birth: Natal, Rio Grande do Norte, Brazil
- Date of death: 31 May 2014 (aged 62)
- Place of death: João Pessoa, Brazil
- Height: 1.78 m (5 ft 10 in)
- Position: Left-back

Youth career
- 1968–1969: Riachuelo AC (Natal, RN)

Senior career*
Years	Team	Apps	(Gls)
1969–1970	ABC	25	(4)
1970–1972	Náutico	60	(8)
1972–1977	Botafogo	74	(10)
1977–1978	Fluminense	28	(10)
1979	New York Cosmos	24	(8)
1980	Fort Lauderdale Strikers	19	(3)
1980–1983	São Paulo	54	(2)
1983–1984	Bangu	6	(0)
1984–1985	Fortaleza	14	(1)
1985–1986	América de Natal	7	(0)
1986–1987	Los Angeles Heat	16	(2)
1987–1988	BC Harlekin Augsburg		
Total		327	(48)

International career
1973–1977	Brazil	28	(4)
- * Club domestic league appearances and goals

Francisco das Chagas Marinho (8 February 1952 – 31 May 2014), generally known as Marinho Chagas or Francisco Marinho, was a Brazilian professional footballer. One of the best left-backs of his era, he is best known for his flowing curly blond hair and his performance at the 1974 FIFA World Cup, in which Brazil finished fourth. At club level he is mostly associated with Botafogo FR of Rio de Janeiro and São Paulo FC, but he played for numerous other teams, as well as in the North American Soccer League, in a career which spanned from 1969 to 1987.

== Club career ==
Marinho Chagas was born in Natal, Rio Grande do Norte. He played left-back with Botafogo FR of Rio and the Brazil national team. He played the Football World Cup 1974. He was a skilful and innovative right footed left back who was considered at the time one of the top players at his position. He was an attack minded full-back with a powerful shot, and is considered a pioneer, becoming very influential in helping the lateral position evolve into what it is in today's Brazilian football.

He travelled the world and played for many different clubs in Brazil, the United States and Germany, always showing great skill and quality, but not settling anywhere for too long. His longest stint was with Botafogo, where he stayed four years from 1972 to 1976.

He spent two years in the North American Soccer League. In the first year, playing for the New York Cosmos alongside Carlos Alberto Torres and the German legend Franz Beckenbauer, his club lost in the semifinal of the championship to eventual winners Vancouver Whitecaps. Marinho scored 8 goals in his 24 matches that season.

The following year, playing with German striker phenomenon Gerd Müller for the Fort Lauderdale Strikers in Florida, he scored three goals in 19 matches. The strikers finished the season as runners-up in the championship, losing the final 3–0 to the Cosmos. However, Marinho did not play in the final.

Back in Brazil he won with São Paulo the State Championship of São Paulo of 1981, the most notable title of his career, overcoming AA Ponte Preta in the finals 1–1, 2–0. His personal performance in this year yield him a third Bola de Prata of the specialist magazine Placar.

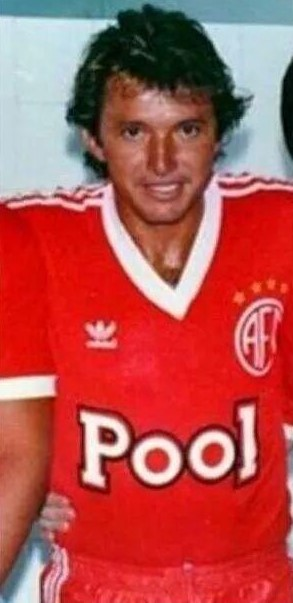
Chagas with América-RN in 1985

He ended his career as player with a brief stint in Germany where he played in the lowest amateur division, the local "C-Klasse", alongside some outdated former minor Bundesliga celebrities in Augsburg for the short-lived BC Harlekin, named after the chain of gambling halls operated by the quasi owner of the club, Mr Peter Eiba who had grand ideas to taking the club all the way to the first division.

After his return to Natal, Marinho stood as Liberal Party candidate for the city council, but was defeated.

His release of the single with the song Eu Sou Assim ("That's the way I am") did not enter him into a career in this sector.

In 1991, he was hired to coach the El Paso Patriots, an amateur team competing in the Southwest Independent Soccer League.

== International career ==
With the Brazil national team Chagas played 36 matches (8 non-official) and scored four goals between 1973 and 1977. He made his debut in a friendly match defeat to Sweden in June 1973. He started in every match during the 1974 FIFA World Cup, and was part of a very solid defense which only conceded four goals in seven matches on their way to a 4th-place finish. Chagas played his last game for Brazil in June 1977 against Yugoslavia.

== Personal life and death ==
Marinho Chagas has no familial relation to the Brazilian serial killer, Francisco das Chagas Rodrigues de Brito, often referred to in press as simply, Francisco das Chagas.

Marinho Chagas died on 31 May 2014 in João Pessoa (RN), from a digestive hemorrhage. At the time of his death, he was working as a sports commentator for a station in Natal. He was 62 years of age. The former full back had been battling alcoholism in his later years, seeking treatment for illnesses related to his drinking.

Marinho Chagas was a father of three, two sons and a daughter as well as a grandfather to three. In an interview in 2013, he joked that he might have other children, given his wild ways, but that none of them come forward to claim him as their father.

== Honours ==
São Paulo

- Campeonato Paulista: 1981

ABC

- Campeonato Potiguar: 1971

Brazil

- Copa Roca: 1976
- Copa Rio Branco: 1976

Individual

- Bola de Prata: 1972, 1973, 1981 by Placar for best player of the year in his position.
- Silver award: South American Player of the Year in 1974 for second best player of South America
- Silver award: Bravo Otto in the 1974 Athlete category
- All-Star Team of 1974 FIFA World Cup
