= Louro (footballer) =

Brazilian footballer (1946–2005)

Personal information
- Full name: Francisco das Chagas Veras
- Date of birth: 26 December 1946
- Place of birth: Caraúbas, Rio Grande do Norte, Brazil
- Date of death: 12 December 2005 (aged 58)
- Place of death: Fortaleza, Ceará, Brazil
- Position: Right-back

Youth career
- 1964–1967: Fortaleza

Senior career*
Years	Team	Apps	(Gls)
1968	Fortaleza		
1968–1969	Corinthians		
1970	Ferroviário–CE		
1970–1974	Fortaleza		
1972	→ Santa Cruz (loan)		
1975–1976	Sport Recife		
1977	Fortaleza		
- * Club domestic league appearances and goals

Francisco das Chagas Veras (26 December 1946 – 12 December 2005), more commonly known as Louro or "Magro de Aço" is a Brazilian retired footballer. He played as a right-back for various different clubs throughout the 1970s, commonly playing for Fortaleza, winning many editions of the Campeonato Cearense.

== Club career ==
Louro began his career within the U–20 sector of Fortaleza in 1964, distinguishing himself for his great speed. He was later promoted to the senior squad in 1968 though he caught the attention of Corinthians who signed him for the remainder of the 1968 season where he made his debut in a 2–1 victory over Palmeiras on 10 March 1968. After an additional season, he wouldn't make the Starting XI for the club and soon returned to Ceará to play for Ferroviário–CE in 1970. However, he then played for Fortaleza again mid-season and remained there for a sizable portion of his career. He was briefly loaned to Santa Cruz in 1972 before returning to Fortaleza for an additional two seasons. His greatest achievement came during the 1974 Campeonato Brasileiro Série A as he was later elected to be part of the XI roster of the annual Bola de Prata by Placar magazine, considered one of the best defenders of the season. He later played for Sport Recife in Pernambuco throughout the next 2 seasons before returning to Ceará once more in the 1977 season before retiring soon after.

== Later life ==
Louro was briefly involved in youth football as he managed the youth sectors of his former club Fortaleza and Bacabal. However, in 2005, during a violent robbery, he was violently assaulted and was hospitalized at Maranguape where he lived his final days before dying on 12 December 2005 from cardiac arrest.
