= Nélson Pescuma =

Brazilian footballer

Personal information
- Full name: Nélson Pescuma
- Date of birth: 26 September 1945
- Place of birth: São Paulo, Brazil
- Date of death: 10 October 2006 (aged 61)
- Place of death: Curitiba, Brazil
- Height: 1.92 m (6 ft 4 in)
- Position: Centre-back

Youth career
- 1959–1961: São Paulo

Senior career*
Years	Team	Apps	(Gls)
1962–1964	São Paulo	6	(0)
1963	→ XV de Piracicaba (loan)		
1965	XV de Piracicaba		
1966–1970	União Bandeirante		
1971–1973	Coritiba		
1973–1974	Portuguesa		
1974–1976	Corinthians	18	(0)
1975–1976	→ Fluminense (loan)	5	(0)
1977	Apucarana		
1978	Golfinho		
- * Club domestic league appearances and goals as of 14 October 2023

Nélson Pescuma (26 September 1945 – 10 October 2006), was a Brazilian professional footballer who played as a centre-back.

== Career ==
A defender who drew attention for his height, unusual at the time for Brazilian football, was trained in the youth sectors of São Paulo, but reached his peak playing for Coritiba, the club where he became an idol. He also participated in the Campeonato Paulista champion squad for Portuguesa in 1973.

== Honours ==
Coritiba

- Campeonato Paranaense: 1971, 1972, 1973
- Torneio do Povo: 1973

Portuguesa

- Campeonato Paulista: 1973

Fluminense

- Campeonato Carioca: 1975

Individual

- 1971 Bola de Prata

== Death ==
Pescuma died in Curitiba at the age of 61, victim from a liver cancer.
