= Berg (footballer, born 1963) =

Brazilian footballer

Personal information
- Full name: Ninimbergue dos Santos Guerra
- Date of birth: 16 March 1963
- Place of birth: Manaus, Brazil
- Date of death: 11 July 1996 (aged 33)
- Place of death: Rio de Janeiro, Brazil
- Position: Attacking midfielder

Senior career*
Years	Team	Apps	(Gls)
1982–1983	Rio Negro-AM		
1984–1990	Botafogo		
1990	Cerro Porteño		
1991–1992	Atlético Paranaense		
1992	Coritiba		
1992	Americano		
1993	America-RJ		
1993	Botafogo		
1994–1995	Americano		
1995	Rio Negro-AM		
1996	América-SP		
- * Club domestic league appearances and goals as of 31 October 2023

Ninimbergue dos Santos Guerra (16 March 1963 – 11 July 1996), better known as Berg, was a Brazilian professional footballer who played as an attacking midfielder.

== Career ==
He started his career at Rio Negro and was the highlight of the 1982 Amazonense Championship, being then hired by Botafogo. He was elected Bola de Prata winner in the 1987 Campeonato Brasileiro Série A, but suffered a serious knee injury, playing few matches in the following seasons.

== Honours ==
Rio Negro

- Campeonato Amazonense: 1982

Botafogo

- Campeonato Carioca: 1989, 1990
- Taça Rio: 1989

Individual

- Bola de Prata: 1987

== Death ==
Berg died of a massive heart attack while playing with friends during his vacations.
