= Joãozinho Rosa =

Brazilian footballer (born 1956)

Personal information
- Full name: João Rosa de Souza Filho
- Date of birth: 4 March 1956 (age 70)
- Place of birth: Altair, São Paulo, Brazil
- Height: 1.80 m (5 ft 11 in)
- Position: Right-back

Youth career
- 1971–1972: Guarani

Senior career*
Years	Team	Apps	(Gls)
1973–1975	Guarani		
1976–1977	Vitória		
1977–1983	Santos	299	(14)
1983	Sport Recife		
1984	Grêmio Maringá		
1985–1986	Paulista		

Managerial career
- 1994–1995: Santos
- 1996: SER Caxias
- 1997: Portuguesa Santista
- 1998–1999: Paysandu
- 2000: Remo
- 2001: Brasiliense
- 2002: Portuguesa Santista
- 2003: Botafogo–SP
- 2010: Paysandu
- * Club domestic league appearances and goals

João Rosa de Souza Filho (born 4 March 1956), more commonly known as Joãozinho Rosa is a Brazilian retired football player and manager. He played as a right-back for Guarani, Santos as well as other clubs throughout the 1970s and the 1980s, winning several titles throughout his career. He also served as a manager for various clubs throughout the 1990s and the early 2000s.

== Club career ==
Within his hometown, Joãozinho began his carer within the Altair Athletic Association.[4][6] Through a recommendation from his brother, he got an opportunity at Guarani, where he was part of the winning squad for the São Paulo youth championship in 1971 with this success seeing him sign his first professional contract two years later. He remained in the club throughout 1973 to 1975 when Vitória manager Tim took interest in Joãozinho offered a transfer through him and André Catimba who had been a club idol. With the deal confirmed, Joãozinho arrived in Bahia in December 1975 and was part of the winning squad for the 1976 Torneio José Américo de Almeida Filho. This season had been successful for him to the point of him winning the 1976 Golden Berimbau Trophy from the Bahian press for the best player that year.

Just as Joãozinho had achieved his first taste of his success, Santos took interest in him during the 1977 season, completing his transfer on June for 2 million cruzeiro. He made his debut 12 June in a 1–1 draw against Palmeiras. Throughout his career with Santos, he experienced his first taste of success at the 1978 Campeonato Paulista where he was part of the winning squad of the tournament.> He was also one of the few players to be part of the 11 recipients for the Bola de Prata in 1980, being considered one of the best defenders of Brazil. However, controversy would soon arise as Joãozinho was soon named in the 1982 Sports Lottery Mafia where he agreed to fix several matches though he wouldn't end up facing criminal charges. He remained with Santos until May 1983 as he played in the finals of the 1983 Campeonato Brasileiro Série A with Santos narrowly missing out on winning the top-flight of Brazilian football as he soon transferred to Sport Recife throughout the remainder of the year. Following a brief stint at Grêmio Maringá in 1984, he spent the remainder of his career with Paulista until retiring in 1986.

== Managerial career ==
Following his retirement as a player, Joãozinho worked within the youth sector of his former club of Santos. Later, in 1994, he became Serginho Chulapa's assistant coach within the senior team, and after the departure of the eternal striker, Joãozinho took charge of Santos, and directed the club between January 1994 and September 1995, remaining at the head of the Santos team in 51 games, with 21 wins, 18 draws and 12 losses. His greatest achievement in the title came during the Copa Dener de Futebol where he led the team to win the 1994 edition.

Following this, he managed SER Caxias during the 1996 season with this being followed by a single season tenure of Portuguesa Santista. He later managed Paysandu in 1998 where he was part of the winning squad for the 1998 Campeonato Paraense and remained until 1999 as he then managed rival club Remo in 2000. Following a brief stint with Brasiliense, he returned to the "Lusa Santista" in 2002. His final managerial roles came with Botafogo–SP in 2003 and for Paysandu once more in 2010.

== Personal life ==
Joãozinho is currently married. He is also part of a family of footballers as he is the younger brother of Bezerra who played for São Paulo throughout the late 1970s and Reinaldo who played as forward. He currently operates the Restaurante Jardins in Ponta da Praia, Santos.
