= Osni Lopes =

Brazilian footballer

Osni
Personal information
- Full name: Osni Lopes
- Date of birth: 13 July 1952 (age 74)
- Place of birth: Osasco, Brazil
- Height: 1.56 m (5 ft 1 in)
- Position: Forward

Youth career
- Cobrasma

Senior career*
Years	Team	Apps	(Gls)
1970–1971	Santos		
1972–1976	Vitória		
1972	→ Olaria (loan)		
1977–1978	Flamengo	63	(16)
1978–1984	Bahia		
1981	→ Santa Cruz (loan)		
1985	Leônico		
- * Club domestic league appearances and goals as of 9 January 2024

Osni Lopes (born 13 July 1952), is a Brazilian former professional footballer who played as a forward.

== Career ==
Revealed by Cobrasma de Osasco, Osni made history in Bahia football, being elected Silver Ball twice playing for Vitória, and then at EC Bahia, being one of the greatest scorers in the club's history with 138 goals. He also played for Santos, Flamengo, Olaria, Santa Cruz and ended his career at AD Leônico de Salvador.

== Honours ==
Vitória

- Campeonato Baiano: 1972

Bahia

- Campeonato Baiano: 1981, 1982, 1983, 1984

Individual

- 1972 Bola de Prata
- 1974 Bola de Prata
- 1984 Torneio Heleno Nunes top scorer
- Campeonato Baiano top scorer: 1974, 1975, 1976, 1983, 1984
