= Botelho (footballer) =

Brazilian footballer (born 1953)

Personal information
- Full name: Sérgio Botelho de Deus
- Date of birth: 14 June 1953 (age 73)
- Place of birth: Rio de Janeiro, Rio de Janeiro, Brazil
- Height: 1.73 m (5 ft 8 in)
- Position: Forward

Senior career*
Years	Team	Apps	(Gls)
1974	Tiradentes		
1975–1976	Nacional–AM		
1977	Volta Redonda		
1978–1979	Grêmio	22	(2)
1979	Bahia		
1980	Desportiva Ferroviária		
1981–1984	Bangu		
1985	Desportiva Ferroviária		
1986–1987	Nacional–AM		
- * Club domestic league appearances and goals

Sérgio Botelho de Deus (born 14 June 1953), more commonly known as Botelho is a Brazilian retired footballer. He played as a forward for a variety of different clubs throughout the 1970s and the 1980s, being known for his careers with Nacional–AM and Desportiva Ferroviária.

== Club career ==
Botelho initially started his career within Tiradentes in Piauí before moving west to play for Nacional in Amazonas for the next two seasons. The next couple of years would be uneventful for him as following a season with Volta Redonda, an initially promising signing for Grêmio in 1978 saw him make few appearances throughout 1978 and 1979. However, he was later signed with Bahia mid-season as Botelho achieved his first national title as he was part of the winning squad for the 1979 Campeonato Baiano. This success caught the attention of Desportiva Ferroviária who signed him for 360,000 cruzeiro to play in the upcoming 1980 Campeonato Brasileiro Série A. The 1980 season had proven so successful for Botelho to where he was inaugurated within the 1980 Bola de Prata as one of the best forwards of the season as Botelho managed to score 10 throughout, becoming the only player from a club based in Espírito Santo to achieve such a feat.
