= Biro-Biro (footballer, born 1959) =

Brazilian footballer (born 1959)

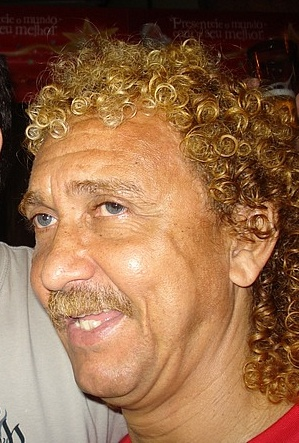

Personal information
- Full name: Antônio José da Silva Filho
- Date of birth: May 18, 1959 (age 67)
- Place of birth: Olinda, Pernambuco, Brazil
- Height: 1.70 m (5 ft 7 in)
- Position: Defensive midfielder

Senior career*
Years	Team	Apps	(Gls)
1977	Sport		
1978–1989	Corinthians		
1990–1991	Portuguesa		
1991	Coritiba		
1991–1993	Guarani		
1993	Paulista		
1993–1994	Remo		
1994	Botafogo-SP		
1995	Nacional-SP		

Managerial career
- 1998: Grêmio Mauaense
- 2001: Barra do Garças
- 2002: Francana
- 2006: Guarujá
- * Club domestic league appearances and goals

Antônio José da Silva Filho (born May 18, 1959), usually known as Biro-Biro, is a retired professional Brazilian footballer who played as a defensive midfielder for several Campeonato Brasileiro Série A clubs.

== Playing career ==
Biro-Biro started his career in 1977, playing for Sport, where he won that season's Campeonato Pernambucano. In 1978, he moved to Corinthians, where he was mistakenly called Lero-Lero by the club's president, Vicente Matheus, during the players presentation at the club. During his eleven seasons as a Corinthians player, he won the Campeonato Paulista four times, in 1979, 1982, 1983 and in 1988, won the Placar's Campeonato Brasileiro Série A Bola de Prata award in 1982, and he scored 75 goals, in 592 matches, placing him as the fifth player with the most appearances for Corinthians. After playing for Portuguesa in 1990 and in 1991, he played for Coritiba in 1991, Guarani from 1991 to 1993 and Paulista in 1993, before playing for Remo in 1993 and in 1994, where he won the Campeonato Paraense in 1993. In 1994, he played for Botafogo-SP then he retired in 1995, while playing for Nacional-SP.

== Managerial career ==
Biro-Biro started his managerial career in 1998, as Mauaense's head coach.

== Political career ==
In 1989, Biro-Biro was elected a Democratic Social Party member of the Municipal Chamber of São Paulo.

== Honors ==
Besides winning the Bola de Prata in 1982, Biro-Biro won the following honors during his playing career:

Club	Competition	Seasons
Corinthians	Campeonato Paulista	1979, 1982, 1983, 1988
Remo	Campeonato Paraense	1993
Sport	Campeonato Pernambucano	1977
