= Picasso (footballer) =

Brazilian footballer (born 1939)

Personal information
- Full name: Ronei Paulo Travi
- Date of birth: 7 May 1939 (age 87)
- Place of birth: Canela, Brazil
- Position: Goalkeeper

Youth career
- Serrano-RS

Senior career*
Years	Team	Apps	(Gls)
1960–1962	Cruzeiro-RS		
1963–1965	Palmeiras	47	(0)
1965	→ Prudentina (loan)		
1966	Volkswagen Clube		
1966	Juventus-SP		
1967–1972	São Paulo	163	(0)
1970	→ Bahia (loan)		
1972	Atlético Paranaense		
1973–1975	Grêmio	187	(0)
1976	Santa Cruz-PE		
1977	14 de Julho		

International career
1965–1968	Brazil	4	(0)

Managerial career
- 1978: Caxias
- * Club domestic league appearances and goals

Ronei Paulo Travi (born 7 May 1939), better known as Picasso, is a Brazilian former professional football player and manager who played as a goalkeeper.

== Club career ==
Picasso started at Cruzeiro de Porto Alegre, and after good seasons he was called to try out at Corinthians and Palmeiras. He signed with Palmeiras, but was a reserve player most of the time. Later played for Prudentina, Volkswagen de São Bernardo do Campo and Juventus. He was considered the best goalkeeper in the 1966 São Paulo championship, managing to attract the attention of São Paulo. He was loaned to Bahia, and on that occasion, he won the "Silver Ball" as best goalkeeper in the 1970 Roberto Gomes Pedrosa Tournament. Also played for Atlético Paranaense until arriving at Grêmio, the team he played for the most in his career.

== International career ==
Picasso made four appearances for Brazil in the 60s.

== Manager mal career ==
Picasso had a brief period as a coach, with Caxias in 1978.

== Honours ==
=== Player ===
Palmeiras

- Campeonato Paulista: 1963

São Paulo

- Campeonato Paulista: 1970, 1971

Santa Cruz

- Campeonato Pernambucano: 1976

Individual

- Bola de Prata: 1970
