= Antônio Carlos (footballer, born 1949) =

Brazilian footballer

Personal information
- Full name: Antônio Carlos Alves Carneiro
- Date of birth: 28 April 1949 (age 77)
- Place of birth: Rio de Janeiro, Brazil
- Height: 1.64 m (5 ft 5 in)
- Position: Right winger

Youth career
- 1961–1966: Vasco da Gama

Senior career*
Years	Team	Apps	(Gls)
1967–1973	America-RJ		
1973–1978	Portuguesa	188	(12)
- * Club domestic league appearances and goals as of 12 February 2024

Antônio Carlos Alves Carneiro (born 28 April 1949), simply known as Antônio Carlos, is a Brazilian former professional footballer who played as a right winger.

== Career ==
A graduate of CR Vasco da Gama, Antonio Carlos started out as a futsal player, which developed his ability to dribble in short spaces. In 1967, he arrived at America to play on the field, where he won the Silver Ball in the 1971 Brazilian Championship. He only won one title with America, the Negrão de Lima International Tournament. Antonio Carlos played for another five years for Portuguesa de Desportos, playing 188 matches and scoring 12 goals.

== Honours ==
America

- Torneio Governador Negrão de Lima: 1967

Portuguesa

- Copa Governador do Estado de São Paulo: 1976

Individual

- 1971 Bola de Prata
