= Alberi =

Brazilian footballer (1945–2022)

Personal information
- Full name: Alberi José Ferreira de Matos
- Date of birth: 28 January 1945
- Place of birth: Recife, Brazil
- Date of death: 28 October 2022 (aged 77)
- Place of death: Natal, Brazil
- Position: Forward

Senior career*
Years	Team	Apps	(Gls)
1968–1969	Santa Cruz		
1969–1975	ABC	409	(210)
1974	→ Rio Negro-AM (loan)		
1975	Sergipe		
1976–1978	América de Natal		
1978	Baraúnas		
1979–1980	Campinense		
1979	→ Alecrim (loan)		
1980–1981	Alecrim		
1981	Icasa		
1981–1984	ABC		
- * Club domestic league appearances and goals as of 2 December 2023

Alberi José Ferreira de Matos (28 January 1945 – 28 October 2022), simply known as Alberi, was a Brazilian professional footballer who played as a forward.

== Career ==
Born in Recife, Alberi played little in Pernambuco, enjoying success in Rio Grande do Norte, at ABC, where he became the greatest player in the club's history by playing 409 matches and scoring 210 goals. He was state champion four times and also won the Silver Ball in 1972. He was also champion for rival América, and for Sergipe and Campinense. Returned to ABC at the end of his career and was champion once again, in 1983.

The ABC Futebol Clube Training Center is named after Alberi.

== Honours ==
ABC

- Campeonato Potiguar: 1970, 1971, 1972, 1973, 1983

Sergipe

- Campeonato Sergipano: 1975

América

- Campeonato Potiguar: 1977

Campinense

- Campeonato Paraibano: 1979

Individual

- 1972 Bola de Prata
- 1971 Campeonato Potiguar top scorer: 16 goals
- 1972 Campeonato Potiguar top scorer: 10 goals

== Death ==
Alberi died on 28 October 2022 in Natal, after spending 10 days hospitalized due to complications of diabetes.
