= Tião Abatiá =

Brazilian footballer (1945–2016)

Personal information
- Full name: Sebastião José Ferri
- Date of birth: 20 January 1945
- Place of birth: Abatiá, Brazil
- Date of death: 16 August 2016 (aged 71)
- Place of death: Londrina, Brazil
- Position: Forward

Senior career*
Years	Team	Apps	(Gls)
1965	Cambará AC		
1966–1971	União Bandeirante		
1971	São Paulo		
1971–1976	Coritiba		
1975	→ Portuguesa (loan)		
1976–1977	Colorado-PR		
- * Club domestic league appearances and goals as of 6 January 2024

Sebastião José Ferri (20 January 1945 – 16 August 2016), better known as Tião Abatiá, was a Brazilian professional footballer who played as a forward.

== Career ==
Tião began his career at Cambará AC (CAC) in 1965. In the following years, he played for União Banderante, until in 1971 he was traded to São Paulo. He did not adapt to the club and returned to Paraná, in Coritiba, where in the first edition of the Brazilian championship, he was one of the highlights of the competition, being awarded the Silver Ball. He won the state championship four times and the Torneio do Povo in 1973, he also had a spell at Portuguesa and ended his career in Colorado.

== Honours ==
Coritiba

- Campeonato Paranaense: 1972, 1973, 1974, 1975
- Torneio do Povo: 1973
- Fita Azul: 1972

Individual

- 1971 Bola de Prata
- 1971 Campeonato Paranaense top scorer: 18 goals (playing for União Bandeirante)
