= Balu (footballer) =

Brazilian footballer

Personal information
- Full name: Luís Carlos Carvalho dos Reis
- Date of birth: 28 December 1961 (age 64)
- Place of birth: Castro Alves, Brazil
- Height: 1.76 m (5 ft 9 in)
- Position: Right back

Senior career*
Years	Team	Apps	(Gls)
1982–1984	Portuguesa Santista		
1985	Ferroviária		
1986–1991	Cruzeiro	288	(5)
1992	Paraná		
1993–1994	Cerro Porteño		
1994	Coritiba		
1995	Marcílio Dias		
1995	Araçatuba		
1996	Inter de Limeira		
1996	Portuguesa Santista		

International career
1991	Brazil	1	(0)
- * Club domestic league appearances and goals as of 14 January 2024

Luís Carlos Carvalho dos Reis (born 28 December 1961), better known as Balu, is a Brazilian former professional footballer who played as a right back.

== Career ==
Considered a very technical right-back, Balu spent most of his career at Cruzeiro, where he played from 1986 to 1991, made 288 appearances and won the state championships in 1987 and 1990. He was also elected Silver Ball in 1989 and called up to the Brazilian team a few times in 1990 and 1991, playing a single match. He ended his career at Portuguesa Santista, a team he also debuted in, and lives in the city of Santos to this day.

== Honours ==
Cruzeiro

- Campeonato Mineiro: 1987, 1990

Individual

- 1989 Bola de Prata
