= Edgardo Andrada =

Argentine footballer (1939–2019)

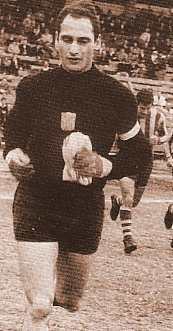

Personal information
- Full name: Edgardo Norberto Andrada
- Date of birth: 2 January 1939
- Place of birth: Rosario, Santa Fe, Argentina
- Date of death: 4 September 2019 (aged 80)
- Height: 1.78 m (5 ft 10 in)
- Position: Goalkeeper

Senior career*
Years	Team	Apps	(Gls)
1960–1969	Rosario Central	283	(0)
1969–1975	Vasco		
1976	Vitória		
1977–1982	Colón	122	(0)
1982	Renato Cesarini	16	(0)

International career
1961–1969	Argentina	20	
- * Club domestic league appearances and goals

Edgardo Norberto Andrada (2 January 1939 – 4 September 2019) was an Argentine footballer who played as a goalkeeper for several top level Argentine and Brazilian clubs.

== Career ==
Born in Rosario, Santa Fe province, Edgardo Andrada initially tried a career as a basketball player, then, when he was 19 years old, he unsuccessfully tried to work as San Lorenzo's goalkeeper, eventually joining Rosario Central, of his home city Rosario, where he started his professional career in 1960, staying in the club until 1969, playing 283 matches. In 1969, he moved to Vasco, of Brazil, leaving the club in 1975.

On 19 November 1969, at Estádio do Maracanã, Edgardo Andrada suffered Pelé's 1000th goal, scored from a penalty kick. While playing for Vasco, he won the Campeonato Carioca in 1970, Placar's Campeonato Brasileiro Série A Bola de Prata award in 1971, and the Campeonato Brasileiro Série A in 1974. In 1976, he played for Vitória, returning to Argentina in 1977, where he played 122 matches for Colón between that year and 1982, and 16 matches for Renato Cesarini in 1982, when he retired.

== National team ==
Edgardo Andrada was Argentina's goalkeeper during the 1963 South American Championship, held in Bolivia.
