= Wágner (footballer, born 1969) =

Brazilian footballer (born 1969)

Personal information
- Full name: Sebastião Wágner de Souza e Silva
- Date of birth: 20 January 1969 (age 57)
- Place of birth: Nova Iguaçu, Brazil
- Height: 1.87 m (6 ft 2 in)
- Position: Goalkeeper

Senior career*
Years	Team	Apps	(Gls)
1989	Bonsucesso		
1990–1993	Bangu		
1993–2002	Botafogo	412	(0)
2002	Santo André		
2003	America-RJ		
2003	Nova Iguaçu		
2004	Madureira		
- * Club domestic league appearances and goals as of 13 June 2023

Sebastião Wágner de Souza e Silva (born 20 January 1969), or simply Wágner, is a former football player, who played as a goalkeeper He is considered one of the greatest players in the history of Botafogo.

== Honours ==
=== Botafogo ===
- Copa CONMEBOL: 1993
- Campeonato Brasileiro: 1995
- Campeonato Carioca: 1997
- Torneio Rio-São Paulo: 1998

=== Individual records ===
- Bola de Prata: 1995
