= Paulo Sérgio (footballer, born April 1969) =

Brazilian footballer

Personal information
- Full name: Paulo Sérgio Pacheco da Silva
- Date of birth: 2 April 1969 (age 57)
- Place of birth: Confins, Brazil
- Height: 1.85 m (6 ft 1 in)
- Position: Centre-back

Youth career
- –1988: Atlético Mineiro

Senior career*
Years	Team	Apps	(Gls)
1988–1995	Atlético Mineiro	72	(2)
1991	→ XV de Jaú (loan)		
1994	→ Anápolis (loan)		
1995–1997	Leça		
1997–2001	Farense		
2001–2002	Varzim		
2002–2003	Aves		
2004	Louletano		
- * Club domestic league appearances and goals as of 18 February 2024

Paulo Sérgio Pacheco da Silva (born 2 April 1969), simply known as Paulo Sérgio, is a Brazilian former professional footballer who played as a centre-back.

== Career ==
Revealed by Atlético Mineiro in 1988, in 1989 he was the revelation defender of Brazilian football, even winning the Silver Ball. He played 72 games and scored 2 goals, playing for the club until 1995. He played the second half of his career for second division clubs in Portugal such as Leça FC and SC Farense. He ended his career in 2004 at Louletano DC. Currently lives and works in Newbury, Berkshire.

== Honours ==
Individual

- 1989 Bola de Prata
