= 1968 São Paulo FC season =

São Paulo
1968 season
- Chairman: Laudo Natel
- Manager: Sylvio Pirillo; Diede Lameiro
- Torneio Roberto Gomes Pedrosa: First stage
- Campeonato Paulista: Second stage

The 1968 football season was São Paulo's 39th season since club's existence.

== Overall ==
| Games played | 51 (26 Campeonato Paulista, 16 Torneio Roberto Gomes Pedrosa, 9 Friendly match) |
| Games won | 20 (11 Campeonato Paulista, 4 Torneio Roberto Gomes Pedrosa, 5 Friendly match) |
| Games drawn | 15 (6 Campeonato Paulista, 6 Torneio Roberto Gomes Pedrosa, 3 Friendly match) |
| Games lost | 16 (9 Campeonato Paulista, 6 Torneio Roberto Gomes Pedrosa, 1 Friendly match) |
| Goals scored | 81 |
| Goals conceded | 74 |
| Goal difference | +7 |
| Best result | 4–0 (H) v Comercial - Campeonato Paulista - 1968.03.20 |
| Worst result | 2–5 (H) v Santos - Campeonato Paulista - 1968.03.27; 2–5 (A) v Fluminense - Torneio Roberto Gomes Pedrosa - 1968.10.17 |
| Most appearances | |
| Top scorer | |

Source: São Paulo FC

== Friendlies ==
| January 14 National | Taubaté | 1–2 | São Paulo | Taubaté |
| | Goal | | Goal | Stadium: Estádio Joaquim de Morais Filho (Joaquinzão) |

| January 21 National | Ferroviária | 3–2 | São Paulo | Araraquara |
| | Goal | | Goal | Stadium: Estádio Adhemar de Barros (Fonte Luminosa) |

| January 25 International | São Paulo (Brazil) | 3–2 | (Portugal) Benfica | São Paulo |
| | Goal | | Goal | Stadium: Estádio Cícero Pompeu de Toledo (Morumbi) |

| February 22 National | São Paulo | 3–3 | Atlético Paranaense | São Paulo |
| | Goal | | Goal | Stadium: Estádio Cícero Pompeu de Toledo (Morumbi) |

| April 7 National | Bahia XI | 3–3 | (São Paulo (state)) São Paulo | Salvador |
| | | | | Stadium: Fonte Nova |

| April 14 National | Fluminense de Feira | 0–2 | São Paulo | Feira de Santana |
| | | | Goal |

| August 4 National | Grêmio Maringá | 0–0 | São Paulo | Maringá |
| | | | | Stadium: Estádio Willie Davids |

| August 18 National | ABC XI | 1–7 | São Paulo | São Bernardo do Campo |
| | | | | Stadium: Estádio Rudge Ramos |

| August 29 National | Nacional | 1–1 | São Paulo | São Paulo |
| | Goal | | Goal | Stadium: Estádio Nicolau Alayon (Rua Comendador Souza) |

| October 5 National | Portuguesa Santista | 2–3 | São Paulo | Santos |
| | Goal | | Goal | Stadium: Estádio Ulrico Mursa |

| November 3 National | Palmeiras | 2–3 | São Paulo | São Carlos |
| | Goal | | Goal | Stadium: Estádio Luís Augusto de Oliveira (Luisão) |

== Official competitions ==
=== Campeonato Paulista ===
| February 4 First stage 1 | São Paulo | 1–2 | Ferroviária | São Paulo |
| | Beluomini 45' (o.g.) | | Valdir 63'; Téia 72' | Stadium: Estádio Cícero Pompeu de Toledo (Morumbi); Attendance: 9 341; Referee: José Favilli Neto |

| February 11 First stage 2 | XV de Piracicaba | 1–3 | São Paulo | Piracicaba |
| | Nicanor 41' | | Haroldo 23' (o.g.); Ismael 41'; Babá 81' | Stadium: Estádio Barão da Serra Negra; Attendance: 9 654; Referee: José de Assis Aragão |

| February 14 First stage 3 | São Paulo | 1–0 | Juventus | São Paulo |
| | Terto 85' | | | Stadium: Estádio Cícero Pompeu de Toledo (Morumbi); Attendance: 4 227; Referee: Emídio Marques de Mesquita |

| February 18 First stage 4 | Botafogo | 1–1 | São Paulo | Ribeirão Preto |
| | Paulo Leão 35' | | Mendes 55' (o.g.) | Stadium: Estádio Santa Cruz; Attendance: 6 224; Referee: Arnaldo Cézar Coelho |

| March 2 First stage 5 | Portuguesa | 0–0 | São Paulo | São Paulo |
| | | | | Stadium: Estádio Municipal Paulo Machado de Carvalho (Pacaembu); Referee: José Astolphi |

| March 7 First stage 6 | São Paulo | 2–1 | São Bento | São Paulo |
| | Benê 41'; Renato 81' | | Esquerdinha 64' | Stadium: Estádio Cícero Pompeu de Toledo (Morumbi); Attendance: 1 607; Referee: Silvio Luiz |

| March 10 First stage 7 | Guarani | 2–3 | São Paulo | Campinas |
| | Joãozinho 16'; Carlinhos 49' | | Renato 22', 70'; Tenente 86' | Stadium: Estádio Brinco de Ouro da Princesa; Attendance: 5 303; Referee: José Favilli Neto |

| March 14 First stage 8 | São Paulo | 2–1 | Palmeiras | São Paulo |
| | Lourival 1'; Babá 20' | | Ademar 30' | Stadium: Estádio Municipal Paulo Machado de Carvalho (Pacaembu); Attendance: 14 1498; Referee: Roberto Goicochea |

| March 17 First stage 9 | Portuguesa Santista | 2–0 | São Paulo | Santos |
| | Serginho 18'; Sérgo 62' | | | Stadium: Estádio Ulrico Mursa; Attendance: 3 414; Referee: José Olimpio Clemente de Oliveira |

| March 20 First stage 10 | São Paulo | 4–0 | Comercial | São Paulo |
| | Paraná 16'; Babá 21'; Terto 65', 89' | | | Stadium: Estádio Municipal Paulo Machado de Carvalho (Pacaembu); Attendance: 3 440; Referee: Arnaldo Cézar Coelho |

| March 24 First stage 11 | América | 1–4 | São Paulo | São José do Rio Preto |
| | Gildo 7' | | Lourival 19'; Faustino 21'; Babá 57'; Ismael 76' | Stadium: Estádio Mário Alves de Mendonça; Attendance: 4 179; Referee: José de Assis Aragão |

| March 27 First stage 12 | São Paulo | 2–5 | Santos | São Paulo |
| | Terto 12', 66' | | Carlos Alberto Torres 29'; Kaneco 60'; Pelé 62', 77'; Douglas 82' | Stadium: Estádio Cícero Pompeu de Toledo (Morumbi); Attendance: 18 854; Referee: Roberto Goicochea |

| March 31 First stage 13 | São Paulo | 2–3 | Corinthians | São Paulo |
| | Babá 20'; Nenê 86' | | Paulo Borges 2'; Flávio 62'; Eduardo 67' | Stadium: Estádio Cícero Pompeu de Toledo (Morumbi); Attendance: 33 796; Referee: Arnaldo Cézar Coelho |

| April 14 Second stage 1 | São Paulo | 3–1 | Portuguesa Santista | São Paulo |
| | Babá 23'; Ismael 60'; Benê 79' | | Raimundinho 37' | Stadium: Estádio Cícero Pompeu de Toledo (Morumbi); Attendance: 3 573; Referee: Roberto Goicochea |

| April 17 Second stage 2 | São Paulo | 2–1 | XV de Piracicaba | São Paulo |
| | Neves 25' (o.g.); Babá 26' | | Jair Bala 87' | Stadium: Estádio Cícero Pompeu de Toledo (Morumbi); Attendance: 2 022; Referee: Vilmar Serra |

| April 21 Second stage 3 | São Bento | 1–1 | São Paulo | Sorocaba |
| | Batista 55' | | Válter 53' | Stadium: Estádio Humberto Reale; Attendance: 3 665; Referee: José Olimpio Clemente de Oliveira |

| April 24 Second stage 4 | Comercial | 3–1 | São Paulo | Ribeirão Preto |
| | Jurandir 9' (o.g.); Marco Antonio 59'; João Pires 86' | | Válter 32' | Stadium: Estádio Doutor Francisco de Palma Travassos; Attendance: 3 068; Referee: Roberto Goicochea |

| April 28 Second stage 5 | São Paulo | 2–0 | Portuguesa | São Paulo |
| | Benê 16'; Russinho 45' | | | Stadium: Estádio Cícero Pompeu de Toledo (Morumbi); Attendance: 6 655; Referee: Oscar Scolfaro |

| May 1 Second stage 6 | Corinthians | 1–1 | São Paulo | São Paulo |
| | Flávio 43' | | Benê 9' | Stadium: Estádio Municipal Paulo Machado de Carvalho (Pacaembu); Referee: Arnaldo Cézar Coelho |

| May 4 Second stage 7 | Juventus | 0–0 | São Paulo | São Paulo |
| | | | | Stadium: Estádio Conde Rodolfo Crespi (Rua Javari); Attendance: 3 769; Referee: Emídio Marques de Mesquita |

| May 8 Second stage 8 | São Paulo | 0–0 | Botafogo | São Paulo |
| | | | | Stadium: Estádio Municipal Paulo Machado de Carvalho (Pacaembu); Attendance: 784; Referee: José Favilli Neto |

| May 11 Second stage 9 | São Paulo | 1–3 | Guarani | São Paulo |
| | Adilson 75' | | Joãozinho 63'; Vagner 67'; Ladeira 85' | Stadium: Estádio Municipal Paulo Machado de Carvalho (Pacaembu); Attendance: 1 618; Referee: Albino Zanferrari |

| May 19 Second stage 10 | Ferroviária | 3–1 | São Paulo | Araraquara |
| | Téia 1'; Pio 27'; Bazzani 56' | | Babá 74' | Stadium: Estádio Adhemar de Barros (Fonte Luminosa); Attendance: 3 231; Referee: Oscar Scolfaro |

| May 22 Second stage 11 | São Paulo | 1–0 | América | São Paulo |
| | Adilson 30' | | | Stadium: Estádio Cícero Pompeu de Toledo (Morumbi); Attendance: 475; Referee: Arnaldo Cézar Coelho |

| May 26 Second stage 12 | Palmeiras | 1–0 | São Paulo | São Paulo |
| | Lauro 38' | | | Stadium: Estádio Cícero Pompeu de Toledo (Morumbi); Attendance: 4 896; Referee: José Olimpio Clemente de Oliveira |

| June 1 Second stage 13 | Santos | 3–1 | São Paulo | Santos |
| | Edu; Toninho Guerreiro 54', 56' | | Babá 74' | Stadium: Estádio Urbano Caldeira (Vila Belmiro); Attendance: 4 784; Referee: José Favilli Neto |

==== Record ====
| Final Position | Points | Matches | Wins | Draws | Losses | Goals For | Goals Away | Win% |
|---|---|---|---|---|---|---|---|---|
| 5th | 28 | 26 | 11 | 6 | 9 | 39 | 36 | 54% |

=== Torneio Roberto Gomes Pedrosa ===
| August 24 First stage 1 | Portuguesa | 1–0 | São Paulo | São Paulo |
| | Goal | | | Stadium: Estádio Municipal Paulo Machado de Carvalho (Pacaembu) |

| September 2 First stage 2 | Atlético Paranaense | 1–1 | São Paulo | Curitiba |
| | Goal | | Goal | Stadium: Estádio Durival Britto e Silva (Vila Capanema) |

| September 8 First stage 3 | Corinthians | 2–1 | São Paulo | São Paulo |
| | Goal | | Goal | Stadium: Estádio Cícero Pompeu de Toledo (Morumbi) |

| September 14 First stage 4 | São Paulo | 0–1 | Internacional | São Paulo |
| | | | Goal | Stadium: Estádio Cícero Pompeu de Toledo (Morumbi) |

| September 22 First stage 5 | Grêmio | 1–1 | São Paulo | Porto Alegre |
| | Goal | | Goal | Stadium: Estádio Olímpico Monumental |

| September 25 First stage 6 | Atlético Mineiro | 1–2 | São Paulo | Belo Horizonte |
| | Goal | | Goal | Stadium: Estádio Governador Magalhães Pinto (Mineirão) |

| October 2 First stage 7 | São Paulo | 0–0 | Bangu | São Paulo |
| | | | | Stadium: Estádio Municipal Paulo Machado de Carvalho (Pacaembu) |

| October 9 First stage 8 | São Paulo | 2–2 | Flamengo | São Paulo |
| | Goal | | Goal | Stadium: Estádio Municipal Paulo Machado de Carvalho (Pacaembu) |

| October 12 First stage 9 | Palmeiras | 1–1 | São Paulo | São Paulo |
| | Goal | | Goal | Stadium: Estádio Cícero Pompeu de Toledo (Morumbi) |

| October 17 First stage 10 | Fluminense | 5–2 | São Paulo | Rio de Janeiro |
| | Goal | | Goal | Stadium: Estádio Jornalista Mário Filho (Maracanã) |

| October 20 First stage 11 | Santos | 0–0 | São Paulo | São Paulo |
| | | | | Stadium: Estádio Cícero Pompeu de Toledo (Morumbi) |

| October 27 First stage 12 | Vasco da Gama | 3–2 | São Paulo | Rio de Janeiro |
| | Goal | | Goal | Stadium: Estádio Jornalista Mário Filho (Maracanã) |

| November 17 First stage 13 | São Paulo | 4–1 | Botafogo | São Paulo |
| | Goal | | Goal | Stadium: Estádio Cícero Pompeu de Toledo (Morumbi) |

| November 23 First stage 14 | São Paulo | 3–1 | Cruzeiro | São Paulo |
| | Goal | | Goal | Stadium: Estádio Cícero Pompeu de Toledo (Morumbi) |

| November 27 First stage 15 | Náutico | 2–3 | São Paulo | Recife |
| | Goal | | Goal | Stadium: Estádio Adelmar da Costa Carvalho (Ilha do Retiro) |

| November 30 First stage 16 | Bahia | 2–1 | São Paulo | Salvador |
| | Goal | | Goal | Stadium: Estádio Octávio Mangabeira (Fonte Nova) |

==== Record ====
| Final Position | Points | Matches | Wins | Draws | Losses | Goals For | Goals Away | Win% |
|---|---|---|---|---|---|---|---|---|
| 10th | 14 | 16 | 4 | 6 | 6 | 23 | 24 | 43% |
