= Aílton (footballer, born 1956) =

Brazilian footballer

Personal information
- Full name: José Aílton de Oliveira Silva
- Date of birth: 29 May 1956
- Place of birth: Laranjeiras, Brazil
- Date of death: 1 June 2021 (aged 65)
- Place of death: Aracaju, Brazil
- Position: Centre-back

Senior career*
Years	Team	Apps	(Gls)
1978–1980	Itabaiana		
1981–1982	Sport Recife		
1983–1985	Cruzeiro		
1986–1992	Sport Recife		
- * Club domestic league appearances and goals as of 21 October 2023

José Aílton de Oliveira Silva (29 May 1956 – 1 June 2021), simply known as Aílton, was a Brazilian professional footballer who played as a centre-back.

== Career ==
Aílton appeared at Itabaiana as part of three state titles won by the club. He repeated the feat at Sport in 1981-82 and at Cruzeiro in 1984. He returned to Sport in 1986 when he established himself in the club's history.

He ended his career in 1992, the year in which he won the Bola de Prata in the Campeonato Brasileiro. Aílton also was placed in the Best XI of the Sport Recife history.

== Honours ==
Itabaiana

- Campeonato Sergipano: 1978, 1979, 1980

Sport

- Campeonato Brasileiro Série B: 1990
- Campeonato Pernambucano: 1981, 1982, 1988, 1991, 1992

Cruzeiro

- Campeonato Mineiro: 1984

== Death ==
Aílton died on June 1, 2021, in the city of Aracaju, victim of a heart attack.
