= Humberto Monteiro =

Brazilian footballer (1947–1980)

Humberto
Personal information
- Full name: Humberto Monteiro
- Date of birth: 30 August 1947
- Place of birth: Cachoeiro de Itapemirim, Brazil
- Date of death: 27 March 1980 (aged 32)
- Place of death: Belo Horizonte, Brazil
- Position: Right back

Senior career*
Years	Team	Apps	(Gls)
1965–1967	Desportiva-ES		
1967–1972	Atlético Mineiro	219	(3)
1972–1974	Portuguesa		
1974	Flamengo	13	(0)
1975	Saad		
1976	Desportiva-ES		
- * Club domestic league appearances and goals as of 9 January 2024

Humberto Monteiro (30 August 1947 – 27 March 1980), was a Brazilian professional footballer who played as a right back.

== Career ==
Humberto began his professional career at Desportiva, where he was champion of Espírito Santo on two occasions. With Atlético Mineiro he was state and Brazilian champion in 1971, in addition to being the winning right back in the first two Silver Ball teams. He also played for Flamengo, Portuguesa and Saad.

== Death ==
Humberto ended up living on the streets in his last years, he asked the player and friend Wilson Piazza for help to help him find somewhere to live in the city of Belo Horizonte. Without giving any news, his body was found on the streets of the city on 27 March 1980.

== Honours ==
Desportiva-ES

- Campeonato Capixaba: 1966, 1967

Atlético Mineiro

- Campeonato Brasileiro: 1971
- Campeonato Mineiro: 1970

Individual

- 1970 Bola de Prata
- 1971 Bola de Prata
