= Roberto Costa =

Brazilian footballer

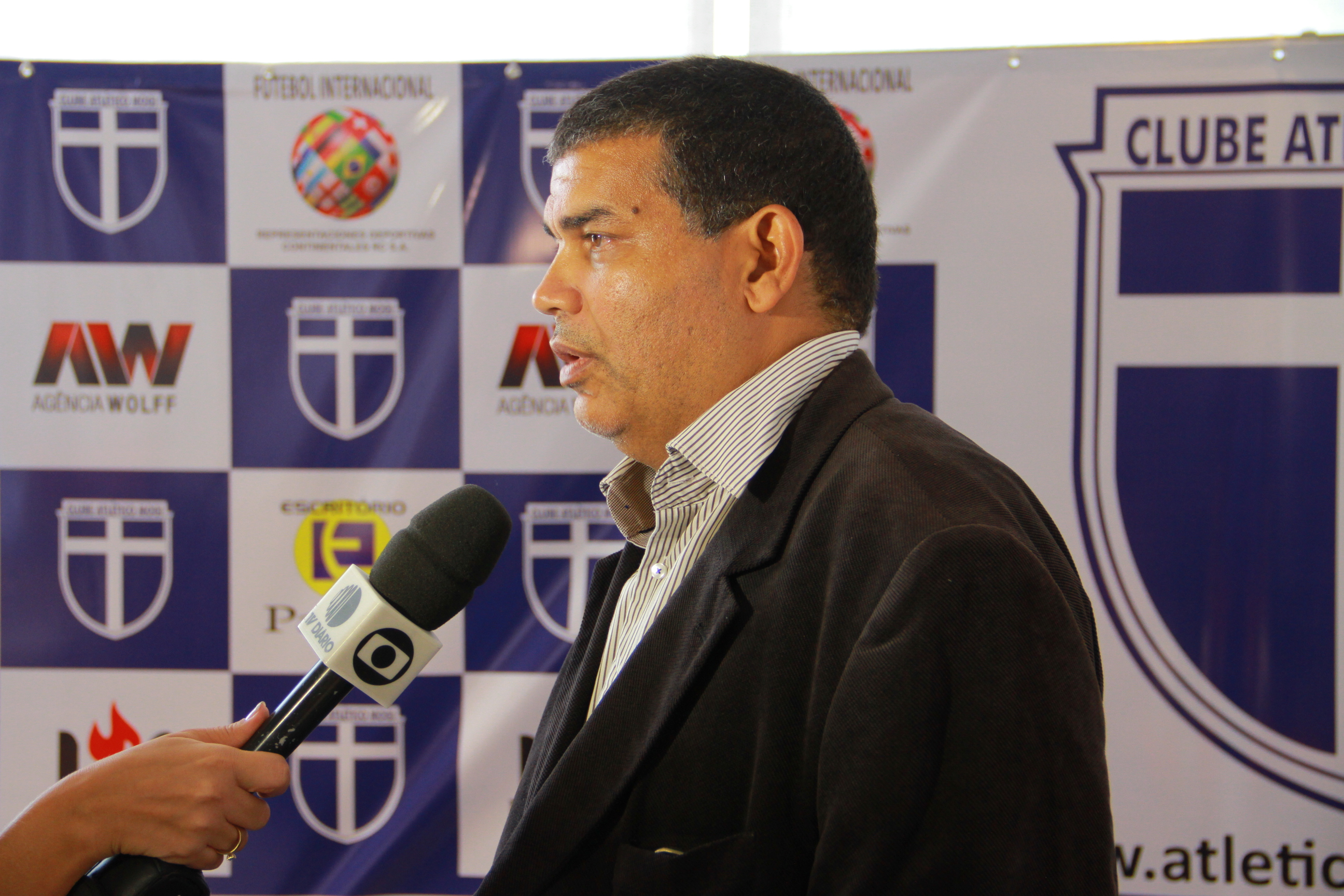
Roberto Costa

Roberto Costa Cabral (born December 8, 1954, in Santos) is a former football player from Brazil. He played goalkeeper (height : 1,85m), mainly with Atlético Paranaense. He twice received the Bola de Ouro award (Golden Ball in English) given to the best player in the Campeonato Brasileiro (Brazilian championship).

He has one cap with the Brazil national team.

== Clubs ==
- Flamengo of Varginha
- Santos FC
- 1978–1983: Atlético Paranaense
- 1984–1984: Coritiba Foot Ball Club
- 1984–1984: Club de Regatas Vasco da Gama
- Internacional
- Taguatinga
- Caldense.
- 1987–1987: Atlético Paranaense

He adopted the surname “Costa” to differentiate himself from “Roberto Dinamite” who played at that time. After two Paraná State championship, gained with Atlético Paranaense, he joined Vasco and was vice-champion of the Campeonato Brasileiro Série A in 1984.

== Honours ==
- Winner of Paraná State championship in 1982 and 1983 with Atlético Paranaense
- Bola de Ouro in 1983 and 1984
