= Torneio Heleno Nunes =

1984 Torneio Heleno Nunes
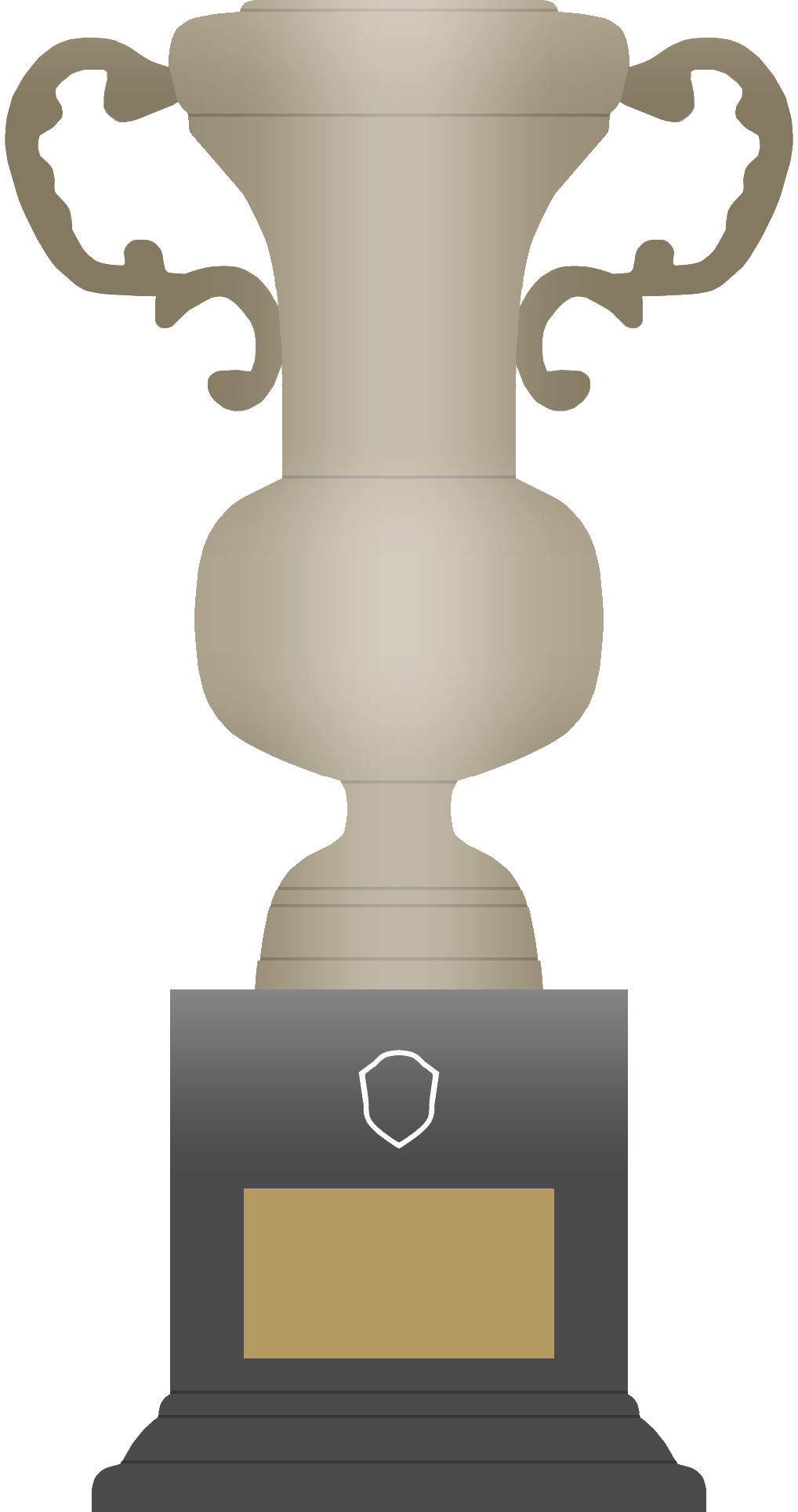

Tournament details
- Country: Brazil
- Dates: 15 Apr – 20 May
- Teams: 10

Final positions
- Champions: Internacional
- Runners-up: Bahia

Tournament statistics
- Matches played: 43
- Goals scored: 82 (1.91 per match)
- Top goal scorer: Osni (Bahia) – 5 goals

The Torneio Heleno Nunes (English: Heleno Nunes Tournament), was an interstate football competition organized by the Federação Paulista de Futebol (FPF) and with the official seal of the Confederação Brasileira de Futebol (CBF), which had the participation of 10 invited teams, which had not qualified for the third phase of the 1984 Campeonato Brasileiro Série A, eight coming from the Series A and two coming from the 1984 Campeonato Brasileiro Série B. The name of tournament was in honor of Heleno de Barros Nunes, former president of CBD and CBF, being the leader in the transition phase from one to the other (1979), who died on March 3, 1984.

== Participants ==
All clubs were invited, but the criterion for participation was that they were already eliminated from the Brazilian Championship.

Club	Criteria
Atlético Mineiro	1984 Campeonato Brasileiro Série A Group J third place (second stage)
Bahia	1984 Campeonato Brasileiro Série A Group I fourth place (second stage)
Botafogo	1984 Campeonato Brasileiro Série A Group N fourth place (second stage)
Cruzeiro	1984 Campeonato Brasileiro Série A Group F fifth place (first stage)
Guarani	1984 Campeonato Brasileiro Série B second stage
Internacional	1984 Campeonato Brasileiro Série A Group M fourth place (second stage)
Palmeiras	1984 Campeonato Brasileiro Série A Group K third place (second stage)
Santa Cruz	1984 Campeonato Brasileiro Série A Group O third place (second stage)
São Paulo	1984 Campeonato Brasileiro Série A Group I third place (second stage)
Sport Recife	1984 Campeonato Brasileiro Série B second stage

== Format ==
The championship was disputed in a single round-robin system, with the team with the most points winning the title.

== Final table ==
Pos	Team	Pld	W	D	L	GF	GA	GD	Pts	Qualification or relegation
1	Internacional	9	5	3	1	15	7	+8	13	Champions
2	Bahia	9	3	5	1	10	8	+2	11	
3	Botafogo	9	1	7	1	5	3	+2	9	
4	Cruzeiro	8	2	4	2	11	8	+3	8	
5	Atlético Mineiro	9	3	2	4	8	11	−3	8	
6	Guarani	9	2	4	3	9	8	+1	8	
7	São Paulo	9	2	4	3	5	6	−1	8	
8	Palmeiras	7	2	3	2	6	8	−2	7	
9	Santa Cruz	8	2	3	3	9	11	−2	7	
10	Sport	9	1	5	3	4	12	−8	7	

Updated to match(es) played on June 11, 2022. Source: RSSSF.com, Futebol Nacional
Rules for classification: 1) points; 2) wins; 3) goal difference; 4) head-to-head points.
