= Pedro Omar =

Brazilian footballer

Personal information
- Full name: Pedro Omar Machado
- Date of birth: 9 June 1948 (age 78)
- Place of birth: Castelo, Brazil
- Position: Midfielder

Youth career
- 1965–1968: Fluminense

Senior career*
Years	Team	Apps	(Gls)
1968–1969	Fluminense		
1969–1974	América-MG		
1974	Flamengo		
1975	Náutico		
1975–1976	Ponte Preta		
1977	Marília		
1977–1980	Comercial-SP		
1981	Paulista		
1982	Operário-MS		
1983	Paulista		

Managerial career
- 1985: Rio Verde-GO
- 1988: Valerio
- 1989: Democrata-GV
- 1989: Democrata-SL
- 1990: Rio Branco-MG
- 1990: Esportivo-MG
- 1990: Paraisense
- 1990–1991: AA Colatina
- 1991: Araxá
- 1991: Patrocinense
- 1992: Rio Branco-MG
- 1992–1993: Democrata-GV
- 1993: Patrocinense
- 1994: AA Colatina
- 1994: Caratinga
- 1995: Desportiva-ES
- 1996: Patrocinense
- 2000–2001: Comercial-SP
- * Club domestic league appearances and goals as of 15 January 2024

Pedro Omar Machado (born 9 June 1948), better known as Pedro Omar, is a Brazilian former professional footballer and manager, who played as a midfielder.

== Career ==
Revealed in the youth sectors of Fluminense, Pedro Omar became famous playing for América Mineiro, a team where he was state champion in 1971 and Silver Ball in 1973. He had a brief spell at Flamengo, where he won the 1974 Campeonato Carioca, and several other clubs.

Pedro Omar also had a coaching career during the 90s with teams from the interior of Minas Gerais and Espírito Santo. After retiring in 2001, he became a physical education teacher and later director of a school in Ribeirão Preto.

== Honours ==
América

- Campeonato Mineiro: 1971

Flamengo

- Campeonato Carioca: 1974

Individual

- 1973 Bola de Prata
