= Carlindo =

Brazilian footballer (born 1946)

Personal information
- Full name: Carlindo Nina Baima
- Date of birth: 7 May 1944 (age 82)
- Place of birth: São Luís, Maranhão, Brazil
- Position: Left-back

Youth career
- Moto

Senior career*
Years	Team	Apps	(Gls)
1964	Maranhão		
1965–1974	Ceará		
1975	América–RN		
- * Club domestic league appearances and goals

Carlindo Nina Baima (born 7 May 1944), commonly known as simply Calindo, is a Brazilian retired footballer. He played as a left-back for Ceará throughout the 1960s and the 1970s and won various titles with the club throughout his career.

== Club career ==
Throughout his teenage years, he played for Flamengo within his hometown where he was a suburban champion. He also had a stint with Moto Club's youth sector around that time. However, he ultimately chose to make his senior debut with Maranhão Atlético Clube where he was promoted to the club's Starting XI by manager Moacir Bueno who elected him to various positions. However, he only remained until mid-1964 as he soon began playing for Ceará the following season. His first title with the club came during his fourth season with the club as he was part of the winning squad for the 1969 Torneio Norte-Nordeste. He was also part of the winning squads for the 1971 and 1972 Campeonato Cearense. His performance during the 1971 season had been so successful that he was a recipient of the annual Bola de Prata by Placar magazine as one of the best defenders of the Campeonato Brasileiro Série A that season. However, he then missed out nearly the entire following season due to injury. Carlindo remained with the club until 1974 as he made 352 appearances and scored 8 goals.
