= Rafael Cammarota =

Brazilian footballer (born 1953)

Personal information
- Full name: Rafael Cammarota
- Date of birth: 7 January 1953 (age 73)
- Place of birth: São Paulo, Brazil
- Position: Goalkeeper

Youth career
- –1974: Corinthians

Senior career*
Years	Team	Apps	(Gls)
1974–1978	Corinthians		
1975–1978	→ Ponte Preta (loan)		
1979–1981	Grêmio Maringá		
1981–1982	Corinthians		
1982–1984	Atlético Paranaense		
1985–1988	Coritiba		
1988	São José-SP		
1989	Sport Recife		
1990–1991	Atlético Paranaense		
1992	Coritiba		
1992–1993	Fortaleza		
1994	Santo André		
1994	Ferroviária		
1994	Fortaleza		
1995	Santo André		
1995	Brasil de Pelotas		

International career
1986	Brazil Olympic	4	(0)

Managerial career
- 2006: União Barbarense
- 2007: União Mogi
- 2007: Atlético Ilhota
- 2008: Cascavel CR
- 2013: Primavera-MT
Medal record
Men's Football
Representing Brazil
South American Games
Bronze medal – third place	1986 Santiago
- * Club domestic league appearances and goals as of 14 September 2023

Rafael Cammarota (born 7 January 1953), is a Brazilian former professional footballer and manager who played as a goalkeeper.

== Career ==
Rafael started his career at Corinthians and had his first chance as main goalkeeper in 1974 during the club's title drought, however, after failing in the final against Palmeiras, he was loaned to Ponte Preta. In 1977 he was exactly the goalkeeper for the club from the city of Campinas in the final that ended the sequence without titles for Corinthians. In 1981 he returned, during the movement called "Corinthians Democracy", however due to personal differences with Wladimir and Walter Casagrande, Rafael ended up leaving the club again.

He went to Atlético Paranaense, and there Rafael began his successful career with state titles in 1982 and 1983. It was at their rival, Coritiba, that Rafael reached his peak, being the goalkeeper in winning the Brazilian title in 1985.

In 1992 Campeonato Paranaense, scored a penalty kick goal against Operário Ferroviário.

== Managerial career ==
In addition to being a goalkeeper coach at Guarani, he commanded União Barbarense, União Mogi, Atlético Ilhota, Cascavel CR and Primavera-MT.

== Honours ==
Athletico Paranaense

- Campeonato Paranaense: 1982, 1983, 1990

Coritiba

- Campeonato Brasileiro: 1985
- Campeonato Paranaense: 1986

Individual

- 1985 Bola de Prata

Brazil Olympic

- South American Games: (bronze) 1986

== See also ==
- List of goalscoring goalkeepers
