= Odirlei (footballer) =

Brazilian footballer

Personal information
- Full name: Odirlei Magno
- Date of birth: 28 March 1952 (age 74)
- Place of birth: Curitiba, Brazil
- Position: Left back

Youth career
- –1971: Britânia-PR

Senior career*
Years	Team	Apps	(Gls)
1971–1975	Pinheiros-PR		
1976	Atlântico-RS		
1976–1981	Ponte Preta		
1982–1984	Portuguesa		
1984	Bangu		
1985–1986	Santa Cruz		
1986	Bangu		
1986–1987	Comercial-SP		
1987	Atlético Três Corações		
1988	União Barbarense		
1988	Velo Clube		
1988	Marília		
1989	Linense		
- * Club domestic league appearances and goals as of 7 January 2024

Odirlei Magno (born 28 March 1952), simply known as Odirlei, is a Brazilian former professional footballer who played as a left back.

== Career ==
Born in Curitiba, he played for Britânia, and after the club's merger, for EC Pinheiros. He had a quick spell at Atlântico in Erechim and then arrived at Ponte Preta, the club where he made history and is considered one of the greatest players of all time. For the Campinas club, he won the Silver Ball in 1978. He later played for Portuguesa, Bangu, where he was Brazilian runner-up in 1985, and Santa Cruz, being state champion in 1986. Odirlei even refused to play for the Brazil national football team in the 80s.

== Honours ==
Santa Cruz

- Campeonato Pernambucano: 1986

Individual

- 1978 Bola de Prata
