= Francisco Reyes (footballer, born 1941) =

Paraguayan footballer

Personal information
- Full name: Francisco Santiago Reyes Villalba
- Date of birth: July 4, 1941
- Place of birth: Asunción, Paraguay
- Date of death: July 31, 1976 (aged 35)
- Place of death: Asunción, Paraguay
- Positions: Midfielder; central defender

Senior career*
Years	Team	Apps	(Gls)
1960–1962	Presidente Hayes		
1963–1966	Olimpia		
1964	→ River Plate (loan)	0	(0)
1966–1967	Atlético de Madrid	0	(0)
1967–1973	Flamengo	74	(3)
1969	→ Campo Grande (loan)	11	(3)
1974–1975	Olimpia		

International career
1961–1966	Paraguay	13	(0)
- * Club domestic league appearances and goals

Francisco Santiago Reyes Villalba, commonly known as Francisco Reyes (July 4, 1941 – July 31, 1976), was a Paraguayan football midfielder and central defender, who played in several top level clubs and in the Paraguay national football team.

== Career ==
Born in Asunción, he started his career playing for Olimpia, winning the Primera División Paraguaya in 1962 and in 1965. Reyes joined Brazilian club Flamengo in 1967, helped the club to win the Campeonato Carioca in 1972, and left at the end of 1973. He retired while defending Olimpia, winning the Paraguayan League in his last season, in 1975.

=== National team ===
He played 13 games for the Paraguay national team between 1961 and 1966

== Honors ==
=== Club ===
Olimpia

- Primera División Paraguaya: 1965, 1975

Flamengo

- Campeonato Carioca: 1972

Flamengo

- Best player of tournament by points (Bola de Ouro)
