= Diede Lameiro =

Brazilian football coach (1934–2021)

Personal information
- Full name: Diede José Gomes Lameiro
- Date of birth: 1934
- Place of birth: Casa Branca, Brazil
- Date of death: 31 March 2021 (aged 87)
- Place of death: São José dos Campos, Brazil

Managerial career
- Years: Team
- 1967–1968: Ferroviária
- 1968–1969: São Paulo
- 1980: Ferroviária
- 1980: Palmeiras
- 1982: Ferroviária
- 1983: Ferroviária
- 1985: Figueirense

Diede José Gomes Lameiro (1934 – 31 March 2021) was a Brazilian professional football coach.

== Career ==
Born in Casa Branca, Lameiro began his career as a basketball player. He began his football career in 1967 as manager of Ferroviária. He had three further spells as manager with the club – in 1980, 1982, and 1983. Under his management the club competed in the Campeonato Brasileiro Série A in 1983, their only time in the competition.

He also managed São Paulo Palmeiras, and Figueirense.

== Later life and death ==
Lameiro died in hospital in São José dos Campos on 31 March 2021 aged 87. He had a wife, three children, eight grandchildren, and eight great-grandchildren.
