= Osmar Guarnelli =

Brazilian footballer (born 1952)

Personal information
- Full name: Jorge Osmar Guarnelli
- Date of birth: 18 February 1952 (age 74)
- Place of birth: Rio de Janeiro, Brazil
- Position: Defender

International career
Years	Team	Apps	(Gls)
- Brazil Olympic

Jorge Osmar Guarnelli (born 18 February 1952), sometimes known as just Osmar, is a Brazilian footballer who played as a defender. He competed in the men's tournament at the 1972 Summer Olympics.
