= Re-Pa =

Association football derby in Brazil

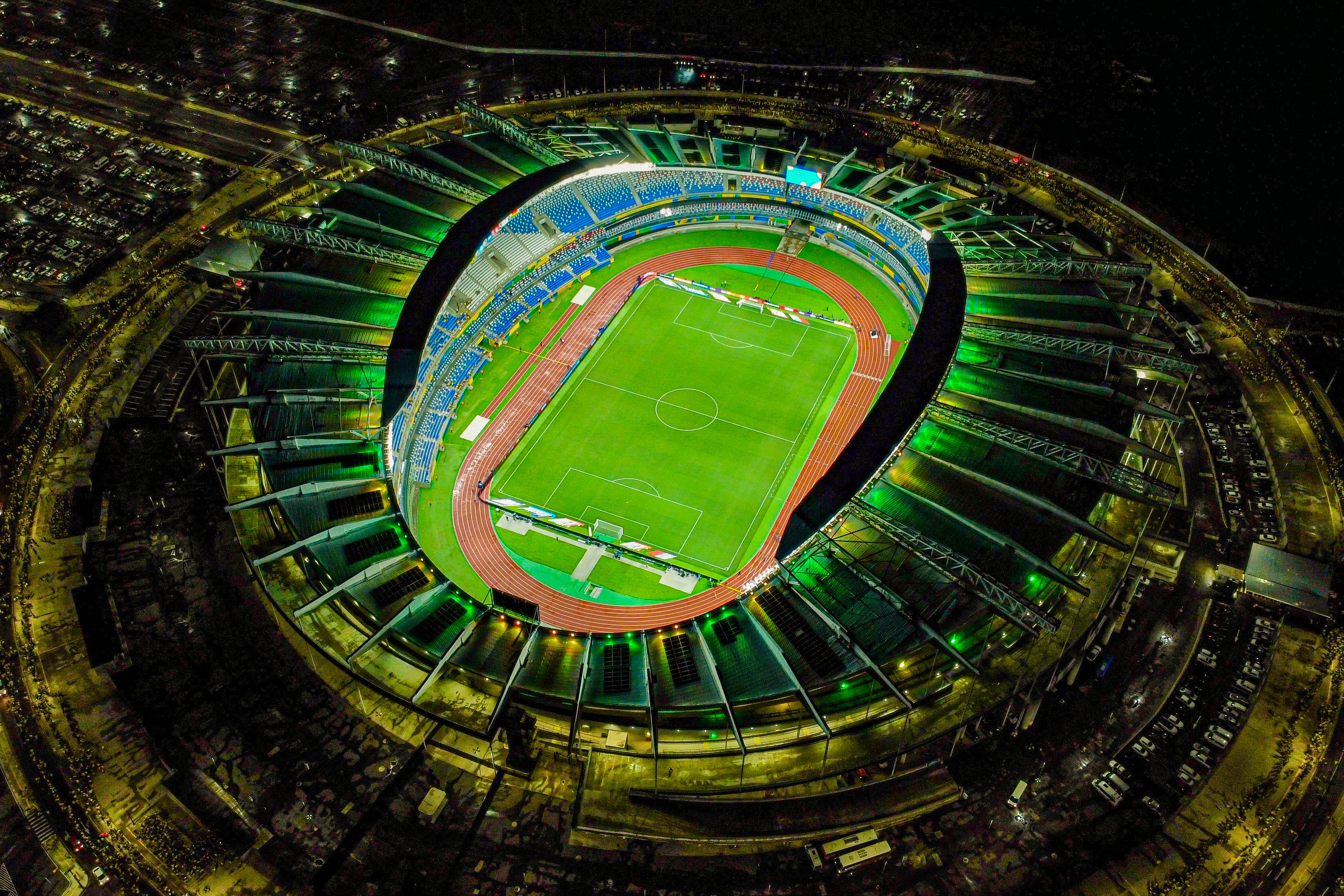
- The Mangueirão stadium, commonly the home of the Re-Pa since 1978
- Other names: Clássico Rei da Amazônia (Amazon King derby)
- Location: Belém, Pará, Brazil
- Teams: Paysandu; Remo
- First meeting: 14 June 1914; Remo 2–1 Paysandu; Campeonato Paraense
- Latest meeting: 8 March 2026; Paysandu 0–0 Remo; 2026 Campeonato Paraense
- Stadiums: Baenão (Remo); Estádio da Curuzu (Paysandu); Mangueirão (neutral)

Statistics
- Total meetings: 783
- Most wins: Remo (270)
- Most player appearances: Quarentinha (135)
- Top scorer: Hélio (47)
- All-time series: Remo: 270; Drawn: 267; Paysandu: 246
- Largest victory: Remo 0–7 Paysandu, 1945 Campeonato Paraense (22 July 1945)

Paysandu	Remo

The Re-Pa is the Brazilian association football derby between two Belém based teams – Remo and Paysandu, the biggest one in Pará and in Brazil's North Region. Both Remo and Paysandu fans recognise each other as their biggest rivals and the derby is one of the fiercest in Brazilian football. With 779 matches, it is the most played derby in the world.

Paysandu (Curuzu) and Remo (Baenão) stadiums are around 200 meters apart, being the 2nd shortest distance between rivals' stadiums in the world, behind only those of the two teams from Dundee, Scotland.

On 4 May 2016, the derby was declared intangible cultural heritage of the State of Pará, being qualified as a cultural expression of the people of Pará.

== History ==
=== First match ===
The first match between the two teams happened on 14 June 1914, by the Campeonato Paraense that year. Remo won 2–1, with goals from Rubilar and an own goal from Bayma. Paysandu's goal was scored by Mateus.

=== Beginning of the rivalry ===
Initially, Remo and Paysandu maintained a somewhat friendly relationship. However, this changed on 23 January 1915, when Remo's first secretary, Elzemann, sent a letter to Antônio Barros (president of Paysandu at the time), in order to carry out a match whose income would be used to help the teams financially. Paysandu sent a letter of reply, surrounded by insulting terms to Remo's proposal. In a second letter, the board of Paysandu accepted the challenge, without putting aside the insults. The following day, Remo sent another letter to end the friendly relations between the clubs. It was the beginning of one of the biggest rivalries in Brazilian football.

== Statistics and records ==
=== Largest wins ===
- Biggest Remo win: 7–2, on 5 March 1939.
- Biggest Paysandu win: 7–0, on 22 July 1945.

=== Longest unbeaten runs ===
- From Remo: 33 matches, from 31 January 1993 to 7 May 1997.
- From Paysandu: 13 matches, from 29 January 1970 to 9 September 1970.

=== Top scorers ===
Rank	Scorer	Club	Goals
1	Hélio	Paysandu	47
2	Itaguary	Remo, Paysandu	30
3	Quarenta	Paysandu	28
3	Cacetão	Paysandu	28
5	Bené	Paysandu	26
6	Quiba	Remo	24
7	Carlos Alberto	Paysandu	23
8	Jaime	Remo, Paysandu	22
9	Farias	Paysandu	21
9	Jeju	Remo, Paysandu	21
11	Santo Antônio	Remo	19

=== Statistics in the Campeonato Brasileiro ===
Division	Matches	Paysandu wins	Drawn	Remo wins	Paysandu goals	Remo goals
Série A	10	2	5	3	9	11
Série B*	18	6	6	6	25	22
Série C	8	2	3	3	8	10
Total	34	9	14	11	39	40

*The matches from the Módulo Amarelo of the 2000 Campeonato Brasileiro are included as Série B matches.

Last match: 14 October 2025, Paysandu 2–3 Remo, Série B

== Clubs' honours ==
Competitions	Paysandu	Remo
Campeonato Brasileiro Série B	2	0
Campeonato Brasileiro Série C	0	1
Campeonato Paraense	51	48
Copa dos Campeões	1	0
Copa Verde	5	1
Copa Norte	2	0
Torneio Norte-Nordeste	0	1
Torneio do Norte	0	3
Super Copa Grão-Pará	1	1
Total	62	55

== Highest attendances ==
- Remo 1–0 Paysandu; 65,000 (11 July 1999); Mangueirão (neutral)
- Paysandu 1–1 Remo; 64,010 (29 April 1979); Mangueirão (neutral)
- Remo 1–0 Paysandu; 52,973 (8 April 1979); Mangueirão (neutral)
- Remo 2–1 Paysandu; 51,304 (26 August 1979); Mangueirão (neutral)
- Paysandu 0–0 Remo; 48,180 (4 February 2024); Mangueirão (neutral)
