= Edson Cimento =

Brazilian footballer

Personal information
- Full name: Carlos Edson Paiva Damasceno
- Date of birth: 8 October 1954 (age 72)
- Place of birth: Capanema, Brazil
- Height: 1.75 m (5 ft 9 in)
- Position: Goalkeeper

Youth career
- 1970: Brasil de Capanema

Senior career*
Years	Team	Apps	(Gls)
1971–1972	Sporting-PA		
1973–1982	Tuna Luso		
1974	→ Paysandu (loan)		
1977–1978	→ Remo (loan)		
1982	→ Fluminense (loan)		
1983–1985	Náutico		
1984	→ ASA (loan)		
1985	→ ASA (loan)		
1986–1987	Nacional-AM		
1988	Princesa do Solimões		
1989–1990	Remo		
1991–1992	Sport Belém		
1992	Ypiranga-AP		
1992	Izabelense		
- * Club domestic league appearances and goals as of 28 November 2023

Carlos Edson Paiva Damasceno (born 8 October 1954), better known as Edson Cimento, is a Brazilian former professional footballer who played as a goalkeeper.

== Career ==
Edson began his career by standing out for Brasil, in the municipal championship in Capanema. He was hired by the extinct Sporting, and in 1973 he arrived at Tuna Luso, where he would play for most of his career. He gained the nickname "Cimento" because Capanema, his hometown, is known as the cement capital. In 1977 he was elected the best goalkeeper in the Brazilian Championship, receiving the Silver Ball. Ended his career at Izabelense in 1992.

== Honours ==
Náutico

- Campeonato Pernambucano: 1984

Nacional-AM

- Campeonato Amazonense: 1986

Individual

- 1977 Bola de Prata
