= Zé Maria (footballer, born 1949) =

Brazilian footballer

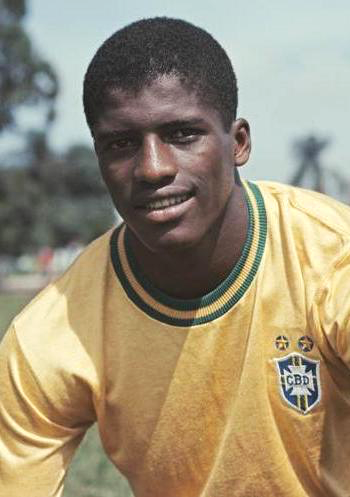
- Zé Maria in 1970

Personal information
- Full name: José Maria Rodrigues Alves
- Date of birth: 18 May 1949 (age 77)
- Place of birth: Botucatu, Brazil
- Height: 1.76 m (5 ft 9 in)
- Position: Right back

Senior career*
Years	Team	Apps	(Gls)
1967–1970	Portuguesa		
1970–1983	Corinthians	599	(17)
1984	Inter de Limeira		

International career
1968–1978	Brazil	47	(0)

Managerial career
- 1983: Corinthians
- 1992: Inter de Limeira
Medal record
Men's Football
Representing Brazil
FIFA World Cup
Winner	1970 Mexico
- * Club domestic league appearances and goals

José Maria Rodrigues Alves, better known as Zé Maria, (born May 18, 1949 in Botucatu) is a former association footballer.

During his career (1966–1983) he played for Ferroviária, Portuguesa, Corinthians and Internacional (RS) as a defender.

For the Brazilian team he played in 46 games from 1968 to 1978. He was a member of the Brazilian squad at the 1970 FIFA World Cup (as a reserve who did not play), but he played in four matches during the 1974 FIFA World Cup.

Zé Maria's son Fernando Lázaro is a coach and development analyst, and worked mainly at Corinthians.

In 1983, Zé Maria was elected a Brazilian Democratic Movement member of the Municipal Chamber of São Paulo.

== Honours ==
Corinthans

- Campeonato Paulista: 1977, 1979, 1982, 1983

Brazil

- FIFA World Cup: 1970

Individual

- Bola de Prata: 1973, 1977
