= 1984 Campeonato Brasileiro Série A =

Campeonato Brasileiro Série A
- Season: 1984
- Champions: Fluminense (2nd title)
- Copa Libertadores: Fluminense; Vasco da Gama
- Matches: 310
- Goals: 747 (2.41 per match)
- Top goalscorer: Roberto Dinamite (Vasco da Gama) - 16 goals
- Biggest home win: Vasco da Gama 9–0 Tuna Luso (February 19, 1984)
- Biggest away win: Ferroviário-CE 0–5 Santos (February 23, 1984)
- Highest scoring: Vasco da Gama 9–0 Tuna Luso (February 19, 1984)
- Average attendance: 18,523

The 1984 Campeonato Brasileiro Série A was the 28th edition of the Campeonato Brasileiro Série A.

== Format ==
First Stage
The 40 clubs were divided in eight groups of five teams each, playing against the other teams of their respective groups twice. The three best placed teams of each group qualified to the Second Stage, while the fourth placed teams of each group competed in a playoff round named Repescagem.

Repescagem
The fourth placed teams of each group played a one-legged playoff. The winners qualified to the Second Stage.

Second Stage
The 28 qualified clubs (24 from the First Stage plus four from the Repescagem) were divided in seven groups of four teams each, playing twice against the other group teams. The two best placed teams of each group qualified to the Third Stage.

Third Stage
The 14 qualified clubs plus the club with the best average points among the ones eliminated in the Second Stage plus the Série B 1984 champion (Uberlândia) were divided in four groups of four teams each, playing against the other teams of their respective groups twice. The two best placed teams of each group qualified to the Quarterfinals.

Final Stage
The Quarterfinals, Semifinals and the Final were played in two legs.

== Standings ==
=== First stage ===
==== Group A ====
Pos	Team	Pld	W	D	L	GF	GA	GD	Pts	Qualification
1	São Paulo	8	4	3	1	16	8	+8	11	Second stage
2	Vasco da Gama	8	4	1	3	20	9	+11	9	Second stage
3	Fortaleza	8	3	2	3	7	11	−4	8	Second stage
4	Tuna Luso	8	2	4	2	6	15	−9	8	Repescagem
5	Nacional	8	0	4	4	5	11	−6	4	

Source: rsssf.com

==== Group B ====
Pos	Team	Pld	W	D	L	GF	GA	GD	Pts	Qualification
1	Atlético Mineiro	8	5	2	1	18	5	+13	12	Second stage
2	Bahia	8	3	3	2	9	11	−2	9	Second stage
3	CRB	8	2	3	3	5	9	−4	7	Second stage
4	Treze	8	2	2	4	7	11	−4	6	Repescagem
5	Bangu	8	1	4	3	4	7	−3	6	

Source: rsssf.com

==== Group C ====
Pos	Team	Pld	W	D	L	GF	GA	GD	Pts	Qualification
1	Santos	8	7	1	0	20	2	+18	15	Second stage
2	Fluminense	8	5	2	1	9	3	+6	12	Second stage
3	ABC	8	3	1	4	9	10	−1	7	Second stage
4	Ferroviário-CE	8	1	2	5	2	16	−14	4	Repescagem
5	Confiança	8	1	0	7	5	14	−9	2	

Source: rsssf.com

==== Group D ====
Pos	Team	Pld	W	D	L	GF	GA	GD	Pts	Qualification
1	Santo André	8	5	2	1	12	8	+4	12	Second stage
2	Grêmio	8	5	2	1	19	7	+12	12	Second stage
3	Náutico Capibaribe	8	4	2	2	10	8	+2	10	Second stage
4	Coritiba	8	2	0	6	11	17	−6	4	Repescagem
5	Catuense	8	0	2	6	4	16	−12	2	

Source: rsssf.com

==== Group E ====
Pos	Team	Pld	W	D	L	GF	GA	GD	Pts	Qualification
1	Flamengo	8	4	4	0	13	6	+7	12	Second stage
2	Palmeiras	8	4	3	1	15	7	+8	11	Second stage
3	Operário-MS	8	3	3	2	15	11	+4	9	Second stage
4	Goiás	8	3	2	3	11	10	+1	8	Repescagem
5	Brasília	8	0	0	8	4	24	−20	0	

Source: rsssf.com

==== Group F ====
Pos	Team	Pld	W	D	L	GF	GA	GD	Pts	Qualification
1	América-RJ	8	4	3	1	11	7	+4	11	Second stage
2	Atlético Paranaense	8	3	3	2	10	8	+2	9	Second stage
3	Brasil-Pel	8	2	4	2	7	9	−2	8	Second stage
4	Rio Branco	8	3	0	5	10	17	−7	6	Repescagem
5	Cruzeiro	8	2	2	4	16	13	+3	6	

Source: rsssf.com

==== Group G ====
Pos	Team	Pld	W	D	L	GF	GA	GD	Pts	Qualification
1	Corinthians	8	3	4	1	9	4	+5	10	Second stage
2	Internacional	8	2	6	0	12	5	+7	10	Second stage
3	Operário-MT	8	2	3	3	10	11	−1	7	Second stage
4	Joinville	8	2	3	3	6	7	−1	7	Repescagem
5	Anapolina	8	1	4	3	3	13	−10	6	

Source: rsssf.com

==== Group H ====
Pos	Team	Pld	W	D	L	GF	GA	GD	Pts	Qualification
1	Santa Cruz	8	4	3	1	11	6	+5	11	Second stage
2	Botafogo	8	4	2	2	8	5	+3	10	Second stage
3	Portuguesa	8	3	3	2	10	4	+6	9	Second stage
4	Auto Esporte-PI	8	3	0	5	10	17	−7	6	Repescagem
5	Moto Club	8	1	2	5	7	14	−7	4	

Source: rsssf.com

=== Repescagem ===
Team 1	Score	Team 2
Tuna Luso	0–1	Treze
Coritiba	3–1	Ferroviário-CE
Goiás	2–1	Rio Branco
Joinville	2–0	Auto Esporte-PI

Treze, Coritiba, Goiás and Joinville qualified to the Second Stage.

=== Second stage ===
==== Group A ====
Pos	Team	Pld	W	D	L	GF	GA	GD	Pts	Qualification
1	Fluminense	6	3	2	1	9	5	+4	8	Third stage
2	Goiás	6	3	1	2	11	9	+2	7	Third stage
3	São Paulo	6	2	3	1	7	6	+1	7	
4	Bahia	6	0	2	4	3	10	−7	2	

Source: rsssf.com

==== Group B ====
Pos	Team	Pld	W	D	L	GF	GA	GD	Pts	Qualification
1	Vasco da Gama	6	3	1	2	10	3	+7	7	Third stage
2	Grêmio	6	3	1	2	3	2	+1	7	Third stage
3	Atlético Mineiro	6	2	1	3	6	7	−1	5	
4	Joinville	6	2	1	3	4	11	−7	5	

Source: rsssf.com

==== Group C ====
Pos	Team	Pld	W	D	L	GF	GA	GD	Pts	Qualification
1	Santos	6	2	3	1	11	7	+4	7	Third stage
2	Fortaleza	6	2	3	1	7	8	−1	7	Third stage
3	Palmeiras	6	2	2	2	15	9	+6	6	
4	Brasil	6	1	2	3	1	10	−9	4	

Source: rsssf.com

==== Group D ====
Pos	Team	Pld	W	D	L	GF	GA	GD	Pts	Qualification
1	Atlético Paranaense	6	3	1	2	9	4	+5	7	Third stage
2	Santo André	6	3	1	2	10	6	+4	7	Third stage
3	Operário-MS	6	3	1	2	5	5	0	7	Third stage
4	ABC	6	1	1	4	5	14	−9	3	

Source: rsssf.com

==== Group E ====
Pos	Team	Pld	W	D	L	GF	GA	GD	Pts	Qualification
1	Portuguesa	6	3	2	1	7	3	+4	8	Third stage
2	Flamengo	6	3	1	2	7	6	+1	7	Third stage
3	Brasil-Pel	6	2	1	3	4	9	−5	5	
4	Internacional	6	1	2	3	5	5	0	4	

Source: rsssf.com

==== Group F ====
Pos	Team	Pld	W	D	L	GF	GA	GD	Pts	Qualification
1	Coritiba	6	3	1	2	8	8	0	7	Third stage
2	América-RJ	6	3	1	2	11	7	+4	7	Third stage
3	Operário-MT	6	2	1	3	6	10	−4	5	
4	Botafogo	6	1	3	2	6	6	0	5	

Source: rsssf.com

==== Group G ====
Pos	Team	Pld	W	D	L	GF	GA	GD	Pts	Qualification
1	Náutico Capibaribe	6	3	1	2	8	8	0	7	Third stage
2	Corinthians	6	2	3	1	8	7	+1	7	Third stage
3	Santa Cruz	6	2	3	1	6	4	+2	7	
4	Treze	6	0	3	3	2	5	−3	3	

Source: rsssf.com

Note: Corinthians qualified due to head-to-head results with Santa Cruz

=== Third stage ===
==== Group A ====
Pos	Team	Pld	W	D	L	GF	GA	GD	Pts	Qualification
1	Fluminense	6	4	2	0	9	3	+6	10	Quarterfinals
2	Portuguesa	6	1	3	2	7	9	−2	5	Quarterfinals
3	Operário-MS	6	1	3	2	5	7	−2	5	
4	Santo André	6	0	4	2	3	5	−2	4	

Source: rsssf.com

==== Group B ====
Pos	Team	Pld	W	D	L	GF	GA	GD	Pts	Qualification
1	Vasco da Gama	6	4	2	0	9	1	+8	10	Quarterfinals
2	Coritiba	6	2	3	1	5	4	+1	7	Quarterfinals
3	Uberlândia	6	2	2	2	4	3	+1	6	
4	Fortaleza	6	0	1	5	3	13	−10	1	

Source: rsssf.com

==== Group C ====
Pos	Team	Pld	W	D	L	GF	GA	GD	Pts	Qualification
1	Flamengo	6	3	2	1	9	4	+5	8	Quarterfinals
2	Náutico Capibaribe	6	3	1	2	9	9	0	7	Quarterfinals
3	Santos	6	2	2	2	8	7	+1	6	
4	América-RJ	6	0	3	3	3	9	−6	3	

Source: rsssf.com

==== Group D ====
Pos	Team	Pld	W	D	L	GF	GA	GD	Pts	Qualification
1	Grêmio	6	3	3	0	10	4	+6	9	Quarterfinals
2	Corinthians	6	3	2	1	10	3	+7	8	Quarterfinals
3	Atlético Paranaense	6	1	3	2	5	9	−4	5	
4	Goiás	6	0	2	4	2	11	−9	2	

Source: rsssf.com

=== Final stage ===
==== Quarterfinals ====
Team 1	Agg.	Team 2	1st leg	2nd leg
Coritiba	2–7	Fluminense	2–2	0–5
Flamengo	3–4	Corinthians	2–0	1–4
Portuguesa	5–9	Vasco da Gama	2–5	3–4
Náutico Capibaribe	3–6	Grêmio	2–3	1–3

==== Semifinals ====
Team 1	Agg.	Team 2	1st leg	2nd leg
Grêmio	1–3	Vasco da Gama	1–0	0–3
Corinthians	0–2	Fluminense	0–2	0–0

==== The Final ====
May 24, 1984

Vasco da Gama	1 – 1	Fluminense
90+4'		Romerito 23'

Maracanã, Rio de Janeiro
Attendance: 63,156
Referee: Luís Carlos Félix

Vasco: Roberto Costa; Edevaldo, Ivan, Daniel González and Aírton; Pires, Arturzinho and Mário (Geovani); Mauricinho (Jussiê), Roberto Dinamite and Marquinho. Head coach: Edu Coimbra.

Fluminense: Paulo Víctor, Aldo, Duílio, Ricardo Gomes and Renato; Jandir, Delei (Renê) and Assis; Romerito, Washington (Wilsinho) and Tato. Head coach: Carlos Alberto Parreira.

May 28, 1984

Fluminense	2 – 1	Vasco da Gama
69' 86'		77'

Maracanã, Rio de Janeiro
Attendance: 128,781
Referee: Romualdo Arppi Filho

Fluminense: Paulo Víctor; Aldo, Duílio, Ricardo Gomes and Branco; Jandir, Delei and Assis; Romerito, Washington and Tato. Head coach: Carlos Alberto Parreira.

Vasco: Roberto Costa; Edevaldo, Ivan, Daniel González and Aírton; Pires, Arturzinho and Mário; Jussiê (Marcelo), Roberto Dinamite and Marquinho. Head coach: Edu Coimbra.

== Final standings ==
Pos	Team	Pld	W	D	L	GF	GA	GD	Pts
1	Fluminense	26	15	9	2	37	13	+24	39
2	Vasco da Gama	26	14	5	7	51	20	+31	33
3	Grêmio	24	14	6	4	39	19	+20	34
4	Corinthians	24	9	10	5	31	19	+12	28
5	Flamengo	22	11	7	4	32	20	+12	29
6	Náutico	22	10	4	8	30	31	−1	24
7	Portuguesa	22	7	8	7	29	25	+4	22
8	Coritiba	22	7	5	10	26	36	−10	19
9	Santos	20	11	6	3	39	16	+23	28
10	Santo André	20	8	7	5	25	19	+6	23
11	Atlético Paranaense	20	7	7	6	24	21	+3	21
12	América-RJ	20	7	7	6	25	23	+2	21
13	Operário-MS	20	7	7	6	25	23	+2	21
14	Goiás	20	6	5	9	24	30	−6	17
15	Fortaleza	20	5	6	9	17	32	−15	16
16	Uberlândia	6	2	2	2	4	3	+1	6
17	São Paulo	14	6	6	2	23	14	+9	18
18	Santa Cruz	14	6	6	2	17	10	+7	18
19	Atlético Mineiro	14	7	3	4	24	12	+12	17
20	Palmeiras	14	6	5	3	30	16	+14	17
21	Botafogo	14	5	5	4	14	11	+3	15
22	Internacional	14	3	8	3	17	10	+7	14
23	Brasil-Pel	14	4	5	5	11	18	−7	13
24	Operário-MT	14	4	4	6	16	21	−5	12
25	Joinville	14	4	4	6	10	18	−8	12
26	Bahia	14	3	5	6	12	21	−9	11
27	CRB	14	3	5	6	6	19	−13	11
28	ABC	14	4	2	8	14	24	−10	10
29	Treze	14	2	5	7	9	16	−7	9
30	Tuna Luso	8	2	4	2	6	15	−9	8
31	Rio Branco	8	3	0	5	10	17	−7	6
32	Auto Esporte-PI	8	3	0	5	10	17	−7	6
33	Ferroviário-CE	8	1	2	5	2	16	−14	4
34	Cruzeiro	8	2	2	4	16	13	+3	6
35	Bangu	8	1	4	3	4	7	−3	6
36	Anapolina	8	1	4	3	3	13	−10	6
37	Moto Club	8	1	2	5	7	14	−7	4
38	Nacional	8	0	4	4	5	11	−6	4
39	Confiança	8	1	0	7	5	14	−9	2
40	Catuense	8	0	2	6	4	16	−12	2
41	Brasília	8	0	0	8	4	24	−20	0

Source: rsssf.com
