= Wilsinho (footballer, born 1956) =

Brazilian footballer

Personal information
- Full name: Wilson Costa de Mendonça
- Date of birth: 3 October 1956 (age 70)
- Place of birth: Rio de Janeiro, Brazil
- Height: 1.79 m (5 ft 10 in)
- Position: Right winger

Youth career
- 1970–1976: Vasco da Gama

Senior career*
Years	Team	Apps	(Gls)
1976–1982	Vasco da Gama		
1982	Flamengo	27	(3)
1982–1987	Fluminense	67	(7)
1985	→ Fluminense de Feira (loan)		
1987	America-RJ		
1988	Volta Redonda		
1988	ABC		
1989	Recreativo Huelva		
- * Club domestic league appearances and goals as of 31 May 2024

Wilson Costa de Mendonça (born 3 October 1956), simply known as Wilsinho, is a Brazilian former professional footballer who played as a right winger.

== Career ==
Revealed by Vasco da Gama's youth sectors, Wilsinho played most of his career at the club, where he was state champion in 1977 and vice-Brazilian in 1979. He also played for Flamengo and Fluminense, where he was champion of the 1984 Campeonato Brasileiro Série A. He ended his career at Recreativo Huelva in Spain in 1989. He received the nickname "Xodó da Vovó", in reference to the Brazilian title of the Precious Pupp cartoon, since, like the dog in the work, he always saved Vasco da Gama.

== Honours ==
Vasco da Gama

- Campeonato Carioca: 1977
- Taça Guanabara: 1977
- Taça Manoel do Nascimento Vargas Netto: 1977

Flamengo

- Taça Guanabara: 1982

Fluminense

- Campeonato Brasileiro: 1984
- Campeonato Carioca: 1983, 1984
