= Duílio Júnior =

Brazilian footballer and manager (born 1957)

Duílio
Personal information
- Full name: Duílio Dias Júnior
- Date of birth: 13 March 1957 (age 69)
- Place of birth: Curitiba, Brazil
- Height: 1.80 m (5 ft 11 in)
- Position: Midfielder

Team information
- Current team: Audax Rio (coach)

Senior career*
| Years | Team | Apps | (Gls) |
| 1976–1980 | Coritiba | | |
| 1981 | Portuguesa | | |
| 1982 | America | | |
| 1983–1985 | Fluminense | | |
| 1985–1988 | Sporting | | |
| 1988–1991 | Estrela Amadora | | |
| 1991–1992 | Ovarense | | |
| 1992–1995 | Portimonense | | |

Managerial career
- 1998–2003: Fluminense (interim)
- 2004–2005: Al Qadisiya
- 2006–2007: Kazakhmys
- 2008: Mesquita
- 2011: Serrano
- 2011: Nova Iguaçu
- 2012: Rio Branco
- 2012: America
- 2015: Rio Branco
- 2017: Bonsucesso
- 2017: Americano
- 2018: America
- 2018–: Audax Rio
- * Club domestic league appearances and goals

Duílio Dias Júnior or simply Duílio (born 13 March 1957) is a Brazilian retired footballer who played as a midfielder, and the current manager.

== Career statistics ==
(Correct as of October 3, 2015)

| Club | Season | State League | | Brazilian Série A | | Total | |
| Club | Season | Apps | Goals | Apps | Goals | Apps | Goals |
|---|---|---|---|---|---|---|---|
| Coritiba | 1976 | ? | ? | ? | ? | ? | ? |
| Coritiba | 1977 | ? | ? | ? | ? | ? | ? |
| Coritiba | 1978 | ? | ? | ? | ? | ? | ? |
| Coritiba | 1979 | ? | ? | ? | ? | ? | ? |
| Coritiba | 1980 | ? | ? | ? | ? | ? | ? |
| Portuguesa | 1981 | ? | ? | ? | ? | ? | ? |
| America | 1982 | ? | ? | ? | ? | ? | ? |
| Fluminense | 1983 | ? | ? | ? | ? | ? | ? |
| Fluminense | 1984 | ? | ? | ? | ? | ? | ? |
| Fluminense | 1985 | ? | ? | ? | ? | ? | ? |
| Total | | ? | ? | ? | ? | ? | ? |

== Honours ==
=== Player ===
Coritiba

- Campeonato Paranaense: 1976, 1978, 1979

America

- Torneio dos Campeões: 1982

Fluminense

- Campeonato Carioca: 1983, 1984
- Campeonato Brasileiro Série A: 1984

Estrela Amadora

- Taça de Portugal: 1989–90

=== Manager ===
Qadsia SC

- Kuwaiti Premier League: 2003–04, 2004–05
- Kuwait Emir Cup: 2005–06

Rio Branco

- Campeonato Capixaba: 2015
