= Tato (footballer, born 1961) =

Brazilian footballer (1961–2026)

Personal information
- Full name: Carlos Alberto Araújo Prestes
- Date of birth: 17 March 1961
- Place of birth: Curitiba, Paraná, Brazil
- Date of death: 27 January 2026 (aged 64)
- Place of death: Curitiba, Paraná, Brazil
- Height: 1.77 m (5 ft 10 in)
- Position: Winger

Youth career
- –1979: Coritiba

Senior career*
Years	Team	Apps	(Gls)
1979–1980	Coritiba		
1981–1982	Internacional		
1982	Goiânia		
1983–1988	Fluminense	242	(18)
1989	Elche	4	(0)
1989–1990	Vasco da Gama		
1991	Sport Recife		
1992	Santos		
1992	Grêmio		
1993	Coritiba		

International career
1984–1985	Brazil	3	(0)
- * Club domestic league appearances and goals

Carlos Alberto Araújo Prestes (17 March 1961 – 27 January 2026), better known as Tato, was a Brazilian professional footballer who played as a winger.

== Career ==
Tato started his career at Coritiba, but stood out playing mainly for Fluminense. With them he won the Campeonato Carioca three years running between 1983 and 1985 and he was also national champion and Silver Ball winner in 1984. During this period he played for the Brazil national team on three occasions, including a defeat to England at the Maracanã Stadium. He moved to Elche in Spain in 1989 but returned the same year where he became Brazilian champion again with Vasco da Gama. He retired in 1993.

== Death ==
Tato died from esophageal cancer on 27 January 2026, at the age of 64.

== Honours ==
Fluminense

- Campeonato Brasileiro: 1984
- Campeonato Carioca: 1983, 1984, 1985
- Taça Guanabara: 1983, 1985
- Tournoi de Paris: 1987
- Kirin Cup Soccer: 1987

Vasco da Gama

- Campeonato Brasileiro: 1989

Individual

- 1984 Bola de Prata
