= Paulo Goulart (footballer) =

Brazilian footballer (1955–2023)

Personal information
- Full name: Paulo Anchieta Goulart Filho
- Date of birth: 11 March 1955
- Place of birth: Muriaé, Minas Gerais, Brazil
- Date of death: 15 September 2023 (aged 68)
- Place of death: Muriaé, Minas Gerais, Brazil
- Position: Goalkeeper

Youth career
- 1971–1976: Fluminense

Senior career*
Years	Team	Apps	(Gls)
1977–1985	Fluminense	158	(0)
1983	→ Ceará (loan)		
1983	→ Marília (loan)		
1985	Olaria		
1986	Rio Negro-AM		
1987	Paysandu		
1987–1988	Itaperuna		
- * Club domestic league appearances and goals

Paulo Anchieta Goulart Filho (11 March 1955 – 15 September 2023), better known as Paulo Goulart, was a Brazilian professional footballer who played as a goalkeeper, notably for Fluminense.

== Career ==
Paulo arrived at Fluminense's youth teams in 1971 and made history at the club as the starting goalkeeper in winning the 1984 Brazilian Championship. His greatest quality was his ability to save from penalty kicks. Paulo played 157 matches for Fluminense and managed 58 clean sheets. He also played for Ceará, Paysandu and other clubs in Brazil. Became an insurance broker after retiring.

== Death ==
Paulo Goulart died in his hometown of Muriaé, on 15 September 2023, at the age of 68.

== Honours ==
Fluminense

- Campeonato Brasileiro: 1984
- Campeonato Carioca: 1980, 1983, 1984
- Taça Guanabara: 1983
