= Aldo (footballer, born 1957) =

Brazilian footballer

Personal information
- Full name: Aldo Silva do Espírito Santo
- Date of birth: 7 September 1957 (age 69)
- Place of birth: Macapá, Brazil
- Position: Right back

Youth career
- Macapá

Senior career*
Years	Team	Apps	(Gls)
1974–1976	Macapá		
1977–1981	Paysandu		
1982–1987	Fluminense	207	(15)
1988	Vitória		
1989–1990	Sport Recife		
1991	Tuna Luso		
1992–1996	Paysandu		

Managerial career
- 2013: Santos-AP
- * Club domestic league appearances and goals as of 14 May 2024

Aldo Silva do Espírito Santo (born 7 September 1957), simply known as Aldo, is a Brazilian former professional footballer who played as a right back.

== Career ==
Born in the state of Amapá, Aldo began his career at EC Macapá, where he was regional champion of the Amazon in 1975. He later played for Paysandu, being state champion twice, and in 1982 he arrived at Fluminense. He entered the club's history with an unusual episode: he captured a black vulture, a bird symbol of CR Flamengo, which had been thrown onto the field by club fans during the final of the 1983 Campeonato Carioca. He earned the nickname "vulture hunter", and was three-time state champion and Brazilian champion with Fluminense, becoming the club's idol. He would be called up for the 1986 FIFA World Cup, but a serious tibia injury in 1985 made his rehabilitation for the competition impossible.

== Personal life ==
Aldo is the brother of fellow footballer Bira, a 1979 Campeonato Brasileiro Série A winner with SC Internacional. In 2020, his residence was robbed and his medals were stolen, but were later recovered.

== Honours ==
Macapá

- Torneio Integração da Amazônia: 1975

Paysandu

- Campeonato Paraense: 1980, 1981

Fluminense

- Campeonato Brasileiro: 1984
- Campeonato Carioca: 1983, 1984, 1985
- Taça Guanabara: 1983, 1985
- Tournoi de Paris: 1987
- Kirin Cup Soccer: 1987
