= Solito =

Solito is a surname. Notable people with the surname include:

== Footballers ==
- Cláudio Roberto Solito (born 1956), Brazilian goalkeeper
- Carlos Alberto Solito (1959-2016), Brazilian goalkeeper

== Other ==
- Auraeus Solito (born 1969), Filipino film director
