= Sócrates =

Brazilian footballer (1954–2011)

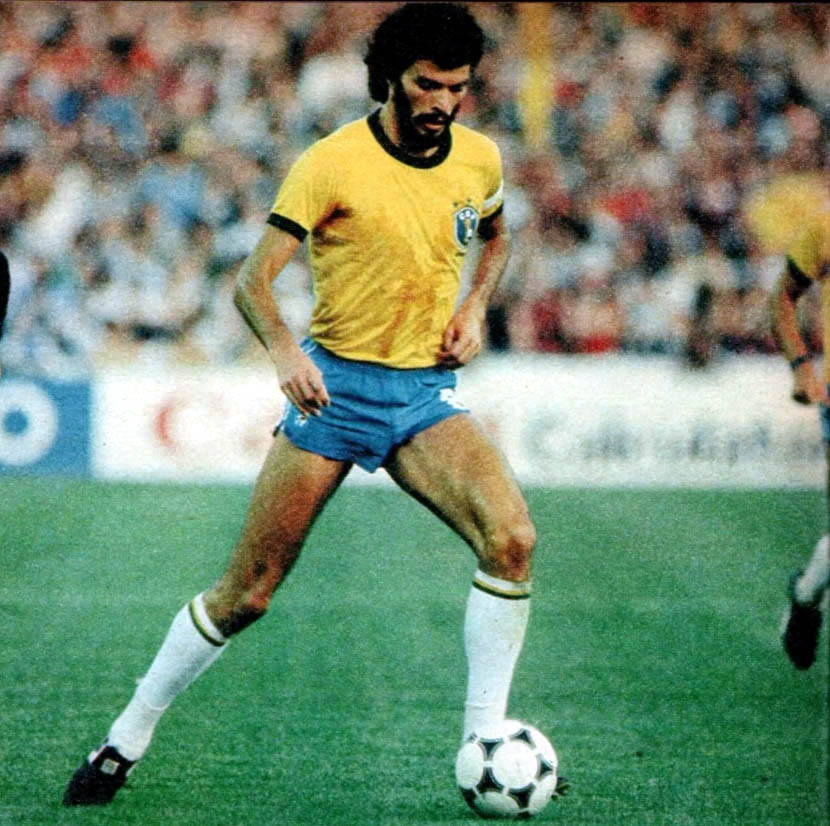
- Sócrates playing for Brazil in 1983

Personal information
- Full name: Sócrates Brasileiro Sampaio de Souza Vieira de Oliveira
- Date of birth: 19 February 1954
- Place of birth: Belém, Pará, Brazil
- Date of death: 4 December 2011 (aged 57)
- Place of death: São Paulo, Brazil
- Height: 1.92 m (6 ft 4 in)
- Position: Midfielder

Senior career*
Years	Team	Apps	(Gls)
1973–1978	Botafogo-SP	99	(35)
1978–1984	Corinthians	297	(172)
1984–1985	Fiorentina	25	(6)
1986–1987	Flamengo	12	(3)
1988–1989	Santos	25	(7)
1989	Botafogo-SP	6	(0)
2004	Garforth Town	1	(0)
Total		465	(223)

International career
1979–1986	Brazil	60	(22)

Managerial career
- 1994: Botafogo-SP
- 1996: LDU Quito
- 1999: Cabofriense
Medal record
Men's Football
Representing Brazil
Copa América
Runner-up	1983
Third place	1979
- * Club domestic league appearances and goals

Sócrates Brasileiro Sampaio de Souza Vieira de Oliveira (19 February 1954 – 4 December 2011), simply known as Sócrates [ˈsɔkɾat͡ʃis], was a Brazilian footballer who played as a midfielder.

A qualified physician and outspoken political activist, he was a leading figure in the Corinthians Democracy movement and an advocate for Brazil's democratisation during the military dictatorship. His medical training, intellectual reputation and distinctive style of play earned him the nickname "Doctor Sócrates".

Sócrates began his professional career at Botafogo-SP before joining Corinthians in 1978, where he became one of the club's most influential players. He was named South American Footballer of the Year in 1983 and subsequently played for Fiorentina in Italy before returning to Brazil in 1985. Widely regarded as one of the greatest midfielders of his generation, he was named in the FIFA 100 list of the world's greatest living players in 2004.

At international level, Sócrates made 60 appearances for Brazil between 1979 and 1986, scoring 22 goals. He captained the national team at the 1982 FIFA World Cup, playing alongside Zico, Paulo Roberto Falcão and Toninho Cerezo in a side celebrated for its attacking style of play. He also represented Brazil at the 1986 World Cup and the 1979 and 1983 Copa América tournaments.

== Early life ==
Sócrates was born on 19 February 1954 in Belém, Pará, the eldest of six sons of Raimundo Vieira de Oliveira and Guiomar Sampaio de Souza. Raimundo, who had grown up in poverty in Fortaleza, was largely self-educated and developed a strong interest in literature and philosophy. He named his first three sons—Sócrates, Sóstenes and Sófocles—after figures from ancient Greece.

In January 1960, following a year in Teresina, Piauí, the family moved to Ribeirão Preto, São Paulo, where Raimundo had secured a posting as a federal income-tax inspector. His improved financial circumstances enabled him to enroll his eldest children at Colégio Marista, a prestigious private school.

In 1964, aged ten, Sócrates witnessed his father destroying books from his personal library following the Brazilian military coup, fearing political repression. Sócrates later recalled being disturbed by the sight of Raimundo disposing of his cherished books, although he did not fully understand its significance until his university years. He subsequently identified the incident as an important early experience in the development of his political awareness.

Sócrates developed an interest in football during his childhood, supporting Santos and admiring the team's players, including Pelé. His father, who served on the board of Botafogo-SP, regularly took him to watch the local club's matches.

In the late 1960s, Sócrates helped Colégio Marista win the Ribeirão Preto schools' football cup for two consecutive years. In 1970, a teacher at the school who also worked with Botafogo's youth teams encouraged him to attend a trial with the club, after which he joined its youth team. His father insisted that he prioritise his education over football, and Sócrates subsequently enrolled at the Faculty of Medicine of the University of São Paulo in Ribeirão Preto. He progressed to Botafogo's professional team in late 1973, continuing his medical studies while playing football. He graduated in 1977, having turned down offers to play for clubs outside Ribeirão Preto until completing his degree.

== Club career ==
=== Botafogo-SP (1973–1978) ===
Sócrates began playing for Botafogo-SP's senior team in the early 1970s, establishing himself as a regular during the 1974 Campeonato Paulista while continuing his medical studies. He formed an effective attacking partnership with centre-forward Geraldão, combining his playmaking abilities with the latter's goalscoring. Botafogo finished sixth overall in the competition, with Geraldão scoring 23 goals.

In 1976, Sócrates finished as the Campeonato Paulista's top scorer with 15 goals, despite playing primarily as a midfielder. The following year, he helped Botafogo win the Taça Cidade de São Paulo, the first stage of the 1977 Campeonato Paulista. The club secured the title after holding São Paulo to a goalless draw, including extra time, at the Morumbi. Sócrates was Botafogo's leading scorer during the campaign, with eight goals. His performances at Botafogo attracted wider attention, and he transferred to Corinthians in 1978, having completed his medical degree the previous year.

=== Corinthians (1978–1984) ===
Sócrates joined Corinthians from Botafogo-SP in 1978, aged 24. Playing primarily as an attacking midfielder, he became one of the team's leading players, known for his passing, goalscoring and distinctive use of backheel passes.

By 1979, Sócrates had formed a prominent attacking partnership with Palhinha, with their combination play attracting attention in the Brazilian sporting press. Sócrates subsequently helped Corinthians win the 1979 Campeonato Paulista, scoring ten goals during the campaign. He opened the scoring in the decisive match against Ponte Preta on 10 February 1980, before Palhinha added a second goal to secure a 2–0 victory.

Following a disappointing 1981 season, Corinthians underwent significant changes in its football administration. The appointment of sociologist Adílson Monteiro Alves as director of football helped establish a system in which players and staff participated in decisions concerning the running of the team.

Under the new system, players, coaches and other club employees participated in votes on matters including training arrangements, player recruitment and pre-match accommodation. Sócrates became one of the leading figures of the movement known as Corinthians Democracy, alongside teammates including Wladimir, Casagrande and Zenon. The movement developed during the final years of Brazil's military dictatorship and increasingly became associated with campaigns for political democratisation. Corinthians players publicly supported electoral participation, displaying political messages on their shirts, while Sócrates became involved in the Diretas Já campaign for the restoration of direct presidential elections.

Corinthians won consecutive Campeonato Paulista titles in 1982 and 1983. Sócrates played a decisive role in the latter campaign, scoring all of Corinthians' goals in the semi-finals and final, including the winning goals against São Paulo in the two legs of the final. Ahead of the 1983 Paulista final, the players carried a banner reading "Ganhar ou perder, mas sempre com democracia" ("Win or lose, but always with democracy"). During his six years at Corinthians, he won three state championships and established himself as one of the club's most prominent players.

In April 1984, during a Diretas Já rally at the Vale do Anhangabaú in São Paulo, Sócrates publicly pledged to remain in Brazil if the proposed Dante de Oliveira constitutional amendment, which sought to restore direct presidential elections, was approved. The amendment was defeated in the Chamber of Deputies on 25 April, falling 22 votes short of the required majority. Sócrates subsequently accepted an offer from Fiorentina, leaving Corinthians after six years and three Campeonato Paulista titles. His departure was among the factors contributing to the subsequent decline of Corinthians Democracy.

=== Fiorentina (1984–1985) ===
Sócrates joined Italian Serie A club Fiorentina in 1984, aged 30. His sole season in Italy was marked by disagreements with the club's management, tensions within the squad and difficulties adapting to Italian football. Despite these problems, he developed a close friendship with Argentine teammate Daniel Passarella, whom he later described as his best friend at the club. Dissatisfied with his experience in Florence, Sócrates terminated his contract after one season and returned to Brazil in 1985, later stating that he had forfeited approximately US$1.5 million in doing so.

=== Flamengo (1985–1987) ===
Sócrates joined Flamengo in September 1985, following his departure from Fiorentina. His move was facilitated by Rogério Steinberg, whom Sócrates later credited with initiating the transfer and assisting in negotiations. The signing offered Sócrates the opportunity to reunite with his close friend and Brazil teammate Zico, who personally welcomed him at Rio de Janeiro's Galeão airport. The prospect of the two playing together generated considerable excitement, with Sócrates expressing his ambition to form a formidable partnership with Zico at the club.

Injuries and international commitments limited Sócrates' appearances alongside Zico. The pair played only one official match together for Flamengo, a 4–1 victory over Fluminense on 16 February 1986, in which Zico scored a hat-trick. Sócrates made 20 appearances and scored five goals for Flamengo, contributing to the club's 1986 Campeonato Carioca title. Following the 1986 World Cup, his involvement was further restricted by back problems and disagreements with manager Sebastião Lazaroni. Sócrates left the club in 1987 and temporarily returned to practising medicine.

=== Santos and return to Botafogo-SP (1988–1989) ===
After a period away from professional football, Sócrates returned to the game in 1988, joining Santos, the club he had supported during his childhood. He made his debut on 29 November, scoring in a 4–2 friendly victory over Uruguayan club Cerro at the Vila Belmiro. According to Santos' official historical records, he made 47 appearances and scored 14 goals for the club between 1988 and 1989. He subsequently returned to Botafogo-SP, where he ended his professional playing career in 1989.

=== Garforth Town (2004) ===
In 2004, more than a decade after retiring, 50-year-old Sócrates agreed to a one-month player-coaching deal with Garforth Town of the Northern Counties East Football League in England. He made his only appearance for the club on 20 November, against Tadcaster Albion, coming on as a substitute twelve minutes from time.

== International career ==
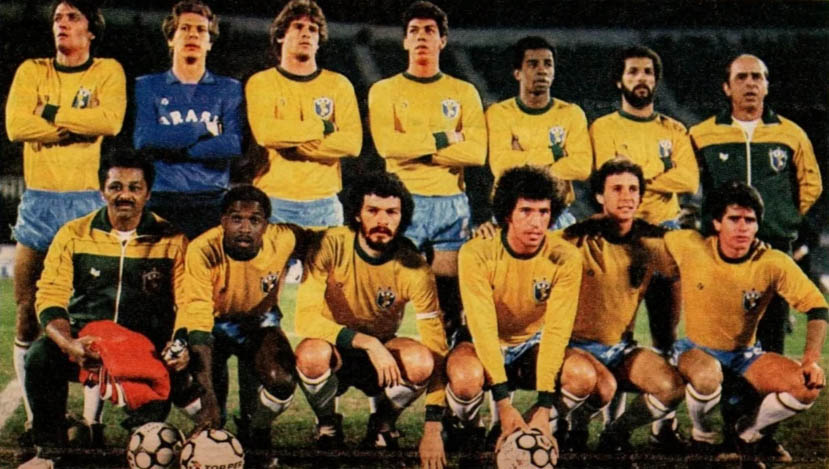
Sócrates (third from left, below) with Brazil in 1983

Sócrates was capped 60 times for Brazil between May 1979 and June 1986, scoring 22 goals. He made his debut for Brazil under manager Cláudio Coutinho in a 6–0 friendly victory over Paraguay on 17 May 1979. He scored his first two international goals in a 5–1 victory over Uruguay later that month.

At the 1979 Copa América, Sócrates scored twice in a 2–2 draw against Argentina and once in the semi-final second leg against Paraguay, although Brazil were eliminated from the competition. During Coutinho's tenure, he also developed an attacking partnership with Zico, with whom he shared a preference for quick passing, improvisation and positional interchange.

Following the appointment of Telê Santana as national team manager in 1980, Sócrates became a regular member of the side and was appointed captain. He later described Santana as the best manager he had worked with, praising his respect for players and his democratic approach to leadership.

In preparation for the 1982 FIFA World Cup, Sócrates gave up smoking and drinking alcohol for several months, having previously reduced his cigarette consumption. According to his close friend and former Corinthians teammate Walter Casagrande, Sócrates' affection for his Brazil teammates, particularly Zico, and his respect for Santana were important motivations behind his commitment to the 1982 World Cup.

Sócrates captained Brazil at the 1982 FIFA World Cup in Spain, playing in all five of the team's matches. Under Telê Santana, Brazil became known for an attacking, possession-oriented style of play associated with futebol-arte. The team's midfield, featuring Sócrates, Zico, Paulo Roberto Falcão and Toninho Cerezo, combined creative passing and positional interchange, supported by the attacking contributions of full-backs Júnior and Leandro.

In Brazil's opening match against the Soviet Union, Sócrates scored the equalising goal with a long-range shot in the 75th minute, helping his team recover from a goal down to win 2–1. He subsequently assisted Falcão's goal in a 4–1 victory over Scotland, before Brazil defeated New Zealand 4–0 to advance to the second group stage. A 3–1 victory over Argentina followed.

Brazil faced Italy on 5 July 1982 in a decisive second-round match, needing only a draw to advance to the semi-finals. After Paolo Rossi gave Italy an early lead, Sócrates equalised in the 12th minute following a pass from Zico. Rossi restored Italy's advantage before Falcão made the score 2–2 in the second half. Rossi subsequently completed his hat-trick, securing a 3–2 Italian victory and eliminating Brazil from the tournament.

Sócrates also appeared at the 1986 World Cup in Mexico. He scored twice at the tournament, starting with a 1–0 victory over Spain in the group stage. His other goal came in the round-of-16 4–0 win over Poland, shooting his penalty kick without running. In the quarter-final against France, he attempted the same technique in the penalty shootout, but his shot was saved by goalkeeper Joël Bats. Brazil subsequently lost the shootout 4–3 and were eliminated from the tournament.

== Style of play ==
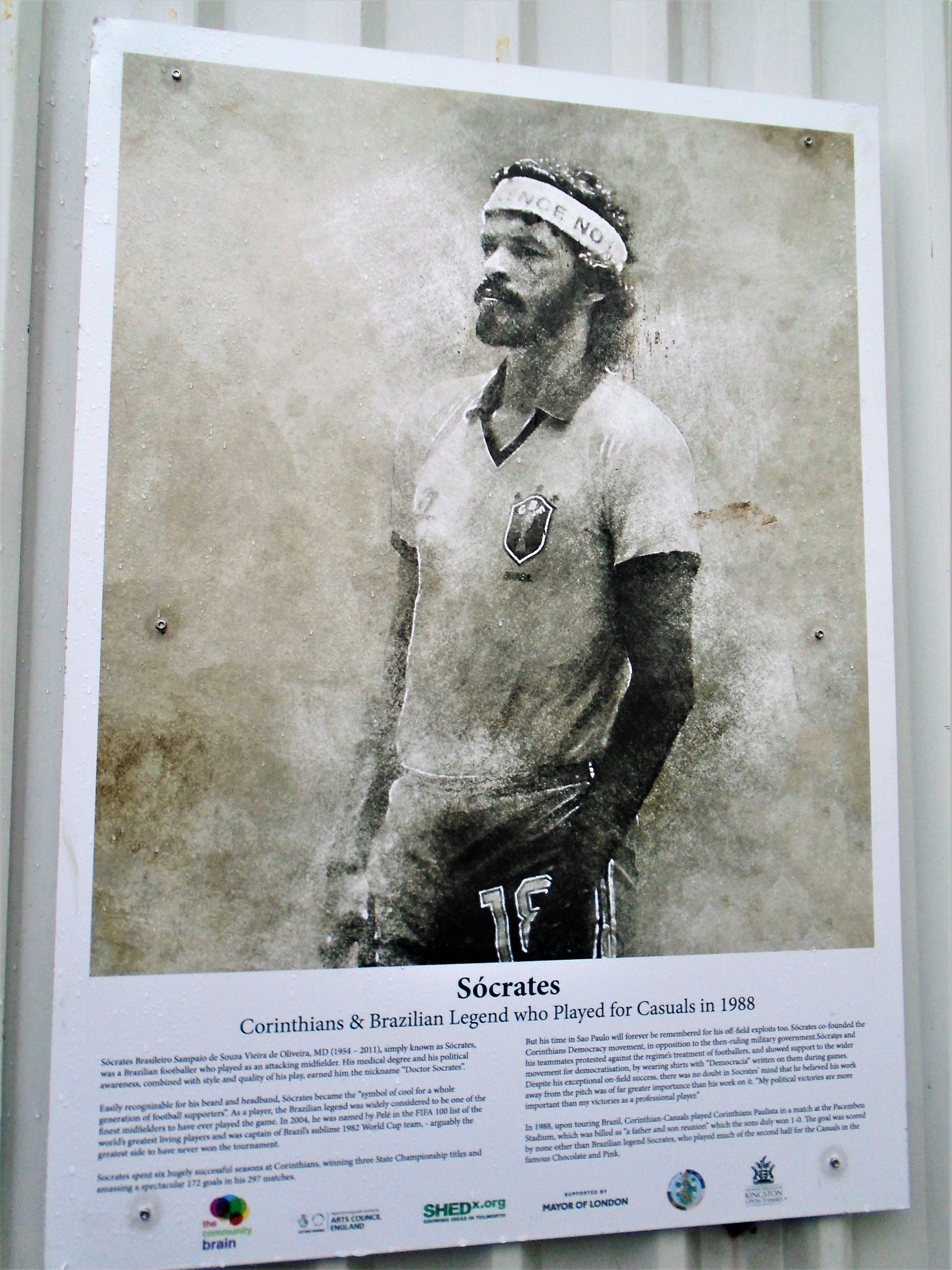
Panel about Sócrates at the club's home ground at King George's Field in Tolworth, Surrey

Originally a centre-forward, Sócrates developed into a playmaker who operated in central or attacking midfield. Known for his vision, precise passing and ability to control the tempo of play, he excelled at combining with teammates through quick exchanges and inventive movement. Although not particularly fast, he compensated with his reading of the game, technical ability and economy of movement. He was also an accomplished goalscorer, possessing a powerful shot and the ability to make late runs into the penalty area. His height made him an aerial threat, while his signature technique was the no-look backheel pass.

Sócrates' distinctive use of the backheel developed partly from his early experiences playing against physically stronger opponents, when he learned to release the ball quickly to avoid challenges. According to his biographer Andrew Downie, Sócrates employed the technique not merely for showmanship but as a practical means of maintaining the flow of play, using different parts of his foot to execute passes from a variety of angles. Zico observed that Sócrates' mastery of the backheel gave him an advantage that opposing defenders struggled to counter. Sócrates' style also reflected the fluidity of Brazil's attacking system under Telê Santana, in which players were encouraged to improvise and interchange positions while fulfilling their tactical responsibilities.

Sócrates was also recognised for his leadership on the pitch. As Brazil captain, he was known for encouraging his teammates rather than criticising them.

== Later life and other activities ==
After retiring from professional football, Sócrates resumed his medical career, having undertaken further clinical training from 1987 and subsequently specialised in sports medicine at the Escola Paulista de Medicina. In 1992, he established the Medicine Sócrates Center, a sports medicine clinic in Ribeirão Preto. The clinic operated during the 1990s, but Sócrates had left its management by 2000, when he returned to football as a coach.

He also worked as a columnist and football commentator, writing and speaking on subjects including sport, politics and society. At the time of his death, he was reportedly working on a fictional book about the 2014 FIFA World Cup. Sócrates also developed plans for a project providing mobile medical services to underserved communities. Following his death, his widow Kátia Bagnarelli sought to realise the initiative, which was intended to provide medical diagnoses and help residents access further treatment.

== Personal life ==
Sócrates married four times and had six children. His younger brother Raí also became a professional footballer, representing Brazil and playing for São Paulo and Paris Saint-Germain. Raí credits Sócrates as an influence on both his football career and his commitment to social causes, including his work with the Fundação Gol de Letra.

Sócrates formed a close friendship with fellow Brazil international Zico, whom he first met in 1977. In a 1982 interview with Placar, both players spoke of their friendship, shared outlook and involvement in professional footballers' rights. During Sócrates' time at Flamengo, his sons Gustavo and Rodrigo played in a children's football team organised by Zico.

Sócrates also developed an enduring friendship with sports journalist Juca Kfouri, whom he first met in 1979 at Corinthians. Kfouri, who had studied sociology at the University of São Paulo, became an important influence on Sócrates' developing political views, introducing him to political literature and challenging his opinions on Brazil's military dictatorship.

Sócrates also shared a close but sometimes strained friendship with former Corinthians teammate Walter Casagrande. Following a period of estrangement, the two publicly reconciled on Arena SporTV in October 2011, shortly before Sócrates' death. Casagrande later recounted their relationship in the 2016 book Sócrates & Casagrande: Uma história de amor, co-written with Gilvan Ribeiro.

== Politics ==
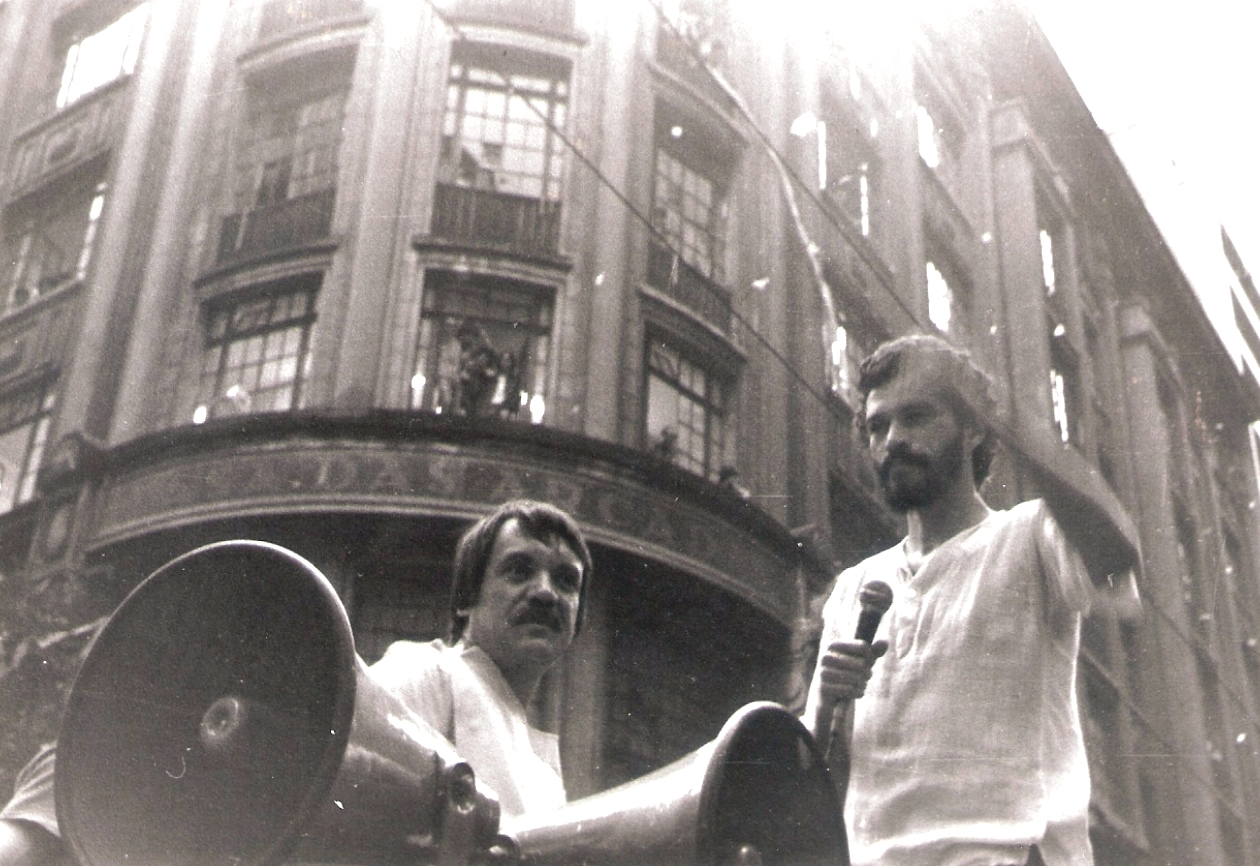
Socrates participating in the political movement for democracy in Brazil - 1984

During his time at Corinthians, Sócrates was a leading figure in the Corinthians Democracy movement, which sought to introduce democratic decision-making within the club during the Brazilian military dictatorship. Players and other club members participated in votes on internal matters, while the team publicly supported Brazil's wider democratisation movement, including by wearing shirts bearing political messages. Sócrates and his teammates regarded the club's participatory decision-making as a potential model for wider democratic reform.

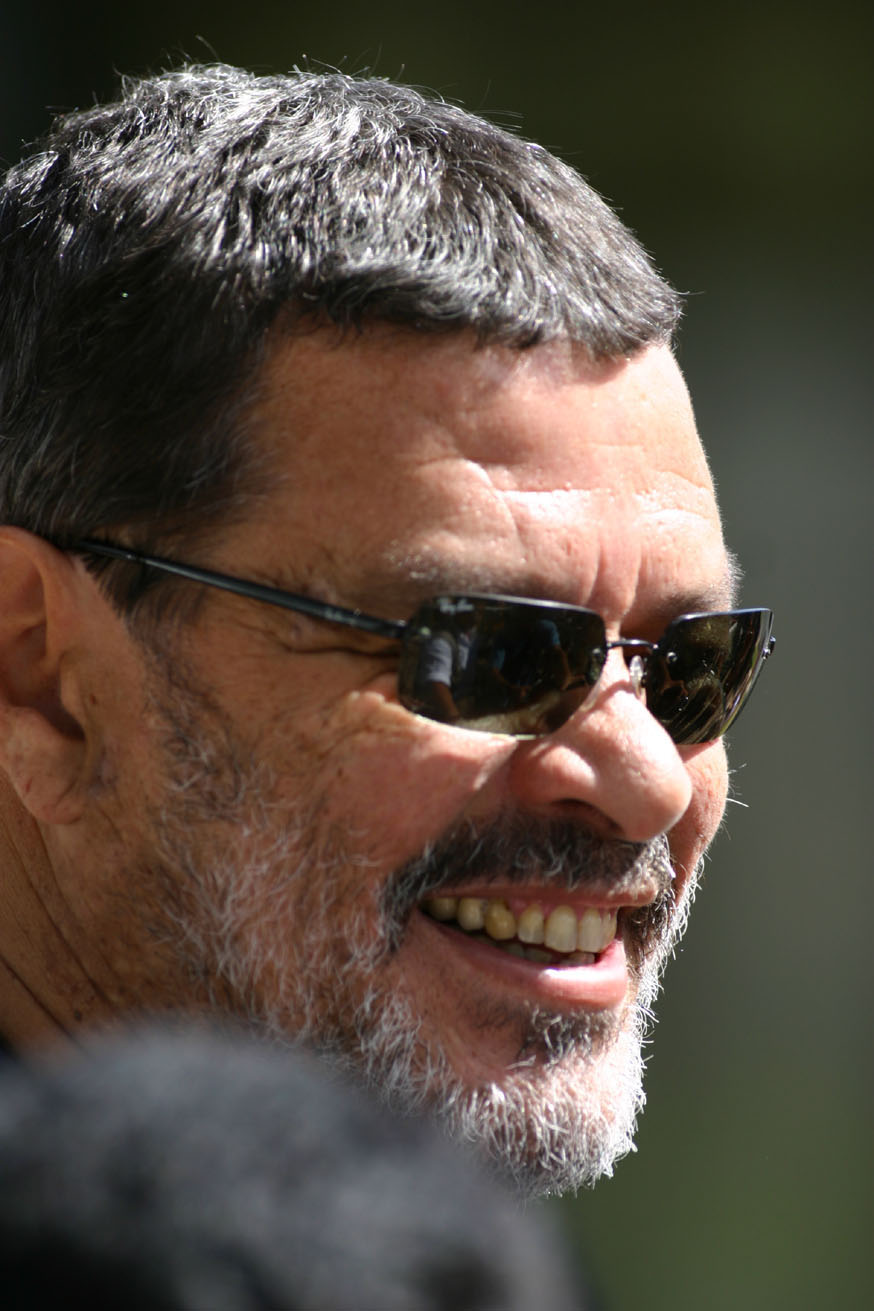
Sócrates in 2005

On 16 April 1984, Sócrates spoke out in support of Diretas Já (Free Elections Now), a popular movement that called for direct presidential elections. He pledged to remain in Brazil rather than move to Italy if a proposed constitutional amendment restoring direct elections was approved. Journalist Juca Kfouri later identified the speech, in which Sócrates tied his own future to Brazil's democratic transition, as a defining moment in his political legacy.

Sócrates was a member of the Workers' Party and maintained a friendship with its leader, Luiz Inácio Lula da Silva, with whom he participated in political activities during the 1980s. Lula attended Sócrates' farewell gathering before his move to Italy in 1984 and later described him as a close friend. Although Sócrates supported Lula, he also expressed reservations about aspects of his presidency.

Sócrates cited Fidel Castro, Che Guevara and John Lennon among his political and cultural heroes.

== Alcohol use and health ==
Sócrates began drinking alcohol during adolescence, later attributing his drinking habits partly to shyness and difficulty socialising.

During his playing career, Sócrates was known for smoking and drinking alcohol, habits that contributed to his reputation as an "anti-athlete". He acknowledged that smoking affected his physical preparation and that his medical studies had limited his early athletic conditioning.

In preparation for the 1982 World Cup, he reduced his smoking and eventually stopped, reporting improvements in his physical condition and ability to train.

In later life, Sócrates developed liver cirrhosis associated with prolonged alcohol consumption.

In a 2016 interview with Época, former Corinthians teammate Walter Casagrande criticised the public's romanticisation of their alcohol and drug use, recalling that behaviour which was damaging their health had often been treated as amusing or admirable.

== Death and tributes ==
On 19 August 2011, Sócrates was admitted to the intensive care unit of the Albert Einstein Hospital in São Paulo with gastrointestinal bleeding secondary to portal hypertension (a complication of cirrhosis) and was discharged nine days later. The following month he spent 17 days in hospital with further complications of liver cirrhosis.

On 1 December 2011, he was hospitalised with food poisoning which developed into septic shock and he was put on life support. He died on 4 December 2011 at the age of 57. Brazilian president Dilma Rousseff paid tribute, saying Brazil had lost "one of its most cherished sons". She added: "On the field, with his talent and sophisticated touches, he was a genius. Off the pitch [...] he was active politically, concerned with his people and his country."

Corinthians fans held up signs in tribute and there was a moment of silence before the team's match against Palmeiras (a 0–0 draw which secured Corinthians their first Brazilian title for six years). The result matched a professed desire of Sócrates, who had once stated his wish "to die on a Sunday when Corinthians won a trophy". Fiorentina held a minute's silence before their league match against Roma, and the players wore black armbands in tribute. Former Fiorentina teammate Giancarlo Antognoni expressed sadness at Sócrates' death, praising his character, strong convictions and charisma, and recalling the respect he commanded in the dressing room.

Sócrates' longtime friend and former Brazil teammate Zico paid tribute to him, praising his intelligence, loyalty and integrity, and describing their friendship as a privilege. On 28 December 2011, he dedicated his annual charity match, the Jogo das Estrelas, to Sócrates at São Paulo's Morumbi stadium, where the two had first met in 1977. Zico had originally planned the tribute while Sócrates was still alive, hoping to encourage him during his illness. At the event, players wore shirts depicting the two former teammates embracing, and Zico presented a commemorative plaque to Sócrates' younger brother Raí.

Sócrates also received tributes from figures across international football. Former Brazil striker Ronaldo expressed his condolences, while Italy's Paolo Rossi described the death as "a piece of our history that's broken off and gone away". Garforth chairman Simon Clifford praised the "great grace" of Sócrates.

== Legacy ==
Pelé named Sócrates in the FIFA 100 list of the world's greatest living players in March 2004 and World Soccer named him one of 100 best footballers in history. In October 2008, he was inducted into the Pacaembu Brazilian Football Museum Hall of Fame.

In 2022, France Football established the Sócrates Award in partnership with Peace and Sport and Sócrates' family. Presented annually as part of the Ballon d'Or ceremony, the award recognises footballers for their humanitarian and social initiatives.

== Career statistics ==
=== Club ===
Appearances and goals by club, season and competition
Club	Season	League			Cup (Note: Includes Copa do Brasil, Coppa Italia, FA Cup)		Other (Note: Includes State League, Supercoppa, FA Vase)		Continental		Total	
Club	Season	Division	Apps	Goals	Apps	Goals	Apps	Goals	Apps	Goals	Apps	Goals
Botafogo-SP	1973	—	–		–		3	0	–		3	0
Botafogo-SP	1974	—	–		–		24	4	–		24	4
Botafogo-SP	1975	—	–		–		15	7	–		15	7
Botafogo-SP	1976	Série A	19	5	–		25	14	–		44	19
Botafogo-SP	1977	Série A	16	9	–		42	18	–		58	27
Botafogo-SP	1978	Série A	22	10	–		0	0	–		22	10
Botafogo-SP	Total		57	24	—		109	43	0	0	166	67
Corinthians	1978	Série A	0	0	–		47	23	–		47	23
Corinthians	1979	—	–		–		29	10	–		29	10
Corinthians	1980	Série A	16	13	–		29	15	–		45	28
Corinthians	1981	Série A	1	1	–		36	22	–		37	23
Corinthians	1982	Série A	9	5	–		37	18	–		46	23
Corinthians	1983	Série A	20	15	–		32	21	–		52	36
Corinthians	1984	Série A	13	7	–		0	0	–		13	7
Corinthians	Total		59	41	—		210	109	0	0	269	150
Fiorentina	1984–85	Serie A	25	6	4	1	–		4	2	33	9
Flamengo	1986	Série A	11	3	–		1	0	–		12	3
Flamengo	1987	Série A	0	0	–		1	0	–		1	0
Flamengo	Total		11	3	—		2	0	0	0	13	3
Santos	1988	Série A	5	2	–		0	0	–		5	2
Santos	1989	Série A	0	0	–		20	5	–		20	5
Santos	Total		5	2	—		20	5	0	0	25	7
Botafogo-SP	1989	Série B	6	0	–		0	0	–		6	0
Garforth Town	2004–05	NCEFL	1	0	0	0	0	0	–		1	0
Career total			164	76	4	1	341	157	4	2	513	236

=== International ===
Appearances and goals by national team and year
National team	Year	Apps	Goals
Brazil	1979	6	5
Brazil	1980	8	2
Brazil	1981	15	6
Brazil	1982	9	4
Brazil	1983	8	2
Brazil	1984	0	0
Brazil	1985	5	1
Brazil	1986	9	2
Total		60	22

Scores and results list Brazil's goal tally first, score column indicates score after each Sócrates goal.

List of international goals scored by Sócrates
No.	Date	Venue	Opponent	Score	Result	Competition	Ref.
1	31 May 1979	Maracanã Stadium, Rio de Janeiro, Brazil	Uruguay	–	5–1	Friendly	
2	31 May 1979	Maracanã Stadium, Rio de Janeiro, Brazil	Uruguay	–	5–1	Friendly	
3	23 August 1979	Estadio Monumental, Buenos Aires, Argentina	Argentina	1–0	2–2	1979 Copa América	
4	23 August 1979	Estadio Monumental, Buenos Aires, Argentina	Argentina	2–1	2–2	1979 Copa América	
5	31 October 1979	Maracanã Stadium, Rio de Janeiro, Brazil	Paraguay	2–1	2–2	1979 Copa América	
6	30 October 1980	Estádio Serra Dourada, Goiânia, Brazil	Paraguay	–	6–0	Friendly	
7	21 December 1980	Verdão, Cuiabá, Brazil	Switzerland	1–0	2–0	Friendly	
8	10 January 1981	Estadio Centenario, Montevideo, Uruguay	Uruguay	1–1	1–2	1980 World Champions' Gold Cup	
9	14 February 1981	Quito, Ecuador	Ecuador	–	6–0	Friendly	
10	14 February 1981	Quito, Ecuador	Ecuador	–	6–0	Friendly	
11	22 February 1981	Estadio Hernando Siles, La Paz, Bolivia	Bolivia	1–0	2–1	1982 FIFA World Cup qualification	
12	29 March 1981	Estádio Serra Dourada, Goiânia, Brazil	Venezuela	2–0	5–0	1982 FIFA World Cup qualification	
13	15 May 1981	Parc des Princes, Paris, France	France	3–0	3–1	Friendly	
14	27 May 1982	Parque do Sabiá, Uberlândia, Brazil	Republic of Ireland	2–0	7–0	Friendly	
15	27 May 1982	Parque do Sabiá, Uberlândia, Brazil	Republic of Ireland	5–0	7–0	Friendly	
16	14 June 1982	Ramón Sánchez Pizjuán Stadium, Seville, Spain	Soviet Union	1–1	2–1	1982 FIFA World Cup	
17	5 July 1982	Sarrià Stadium, Barcelona, Spain	Italy	1–1	2–3	1982 FIFA World Cup	
18	8 June 1983	Estádio Cidade de Coimbra, Coimbra, Portugal	Portugal	3–0	4–0	Friendly	
19	17 June 1983	St. Jakob-Park, Basel, Switzerland	Switzerland	1–1	2–1	Friendly	
20	23 June 1985	Maracanã Stadium, Rio de Janeiro, Brazil	Paraguay	1–0	1–1	1986 FIFA World Cup qualification	
21	1 June 1986	Estadio Jalisco, Guadalajara, Mexico	Spain	1–0	1–0	1986 FIFA World Cup	
22	16 June 1986	Estadio Jalisco, Guadalajara, Mexico	Poland	1–0	4–0	1986 FIFA World Cup	

== Honours ==
Botafogo-SP

- Torneio Vicente Feola: 1976

Corinthians

- Campeonato Paulista: 1979, 1982, 1983

Flamengo

- Taça Rio: 1986
- Campeonato Carioca: 1986

Brazil

- Copa América runner-up: 1983; third place: 1979
- Brazil-England Cup: 1981
- Mundialito runner-up: 1980

Individual

- Campeonato Paulista top scorer: 1976
- Bola de Prata: 1980
- World XI: 1982
- World Soccer World XI: 1982, 1983, 1984
- World Soccer: 61st Greatest Player of the 20th Century
- FourFourTwo: 30th Greatest Player of All Time
- South American Footballer of the Year: 1983
- FAI International Football Awards – International Personality: 2007
- FIFA 100
- Brazilian Football Museum Hall of Fame
