= Ataliba =

Ataliba may refer to:

- Ataliba (footballer, born 1956), Brazilian football winger Édson Ataliba Cândido
- Ataliba (footballer, born 1979), Brazilian football midfielder Carlos Eduardo Soares
