= Cláudio Roberto Solito =

Brazilian footballer

Solito
Personal information
- Full name: Cláudio Roberto Solito
- Date of birth: 14 December 1956 (age 69)
- Place of birth: São Paulo, Brazil
- Position: Goalkeeper

Youth career
- –1975: Corinthians

Senior career*
Years	Team	Apps	(Gls)
1975–1986	Corinthians	173	(0)
1980	→ Náutico (loan)		
1981	→ Taubaté (loan)		
1987	Paulista		
1988	Ferroviário Itu		
1989	Nacional-SP		
- * Club domestic league appearances and goals as of 23 November 2023

Cláudio Roberto Solito (born 14 December 1956), simply known as Solito, is a Brazilian former professional footballer who played as a goalkeeper.

== Career ==
Solito began his career in the youth teams of Corinthians, a club he played for until 1986 and was state champion on three occasions. He made a total of 173 appearances for the club. He also played for Paulista, Ituano and Nacional, where he ended his career.

== Personal life ==
Solito is the older brother of Carlos Alberto Solito (Solitinho), who was also a goalkeeper at Corinthians and was his substitute on some occasions.

== Honours ==
Corinthians

- Campeonato Paulista: 1979, 1982, 1983
