= Goularte =

Goularte is a surname. Notable people with the surname include:

- Harry Goularte (born 1956) American racing driver
- Igor Goularte (born 1996) Brazilian football player

== See also ==
- Goulart
