= Ataliba (footballer, born 1956) =

Brazilian footballer

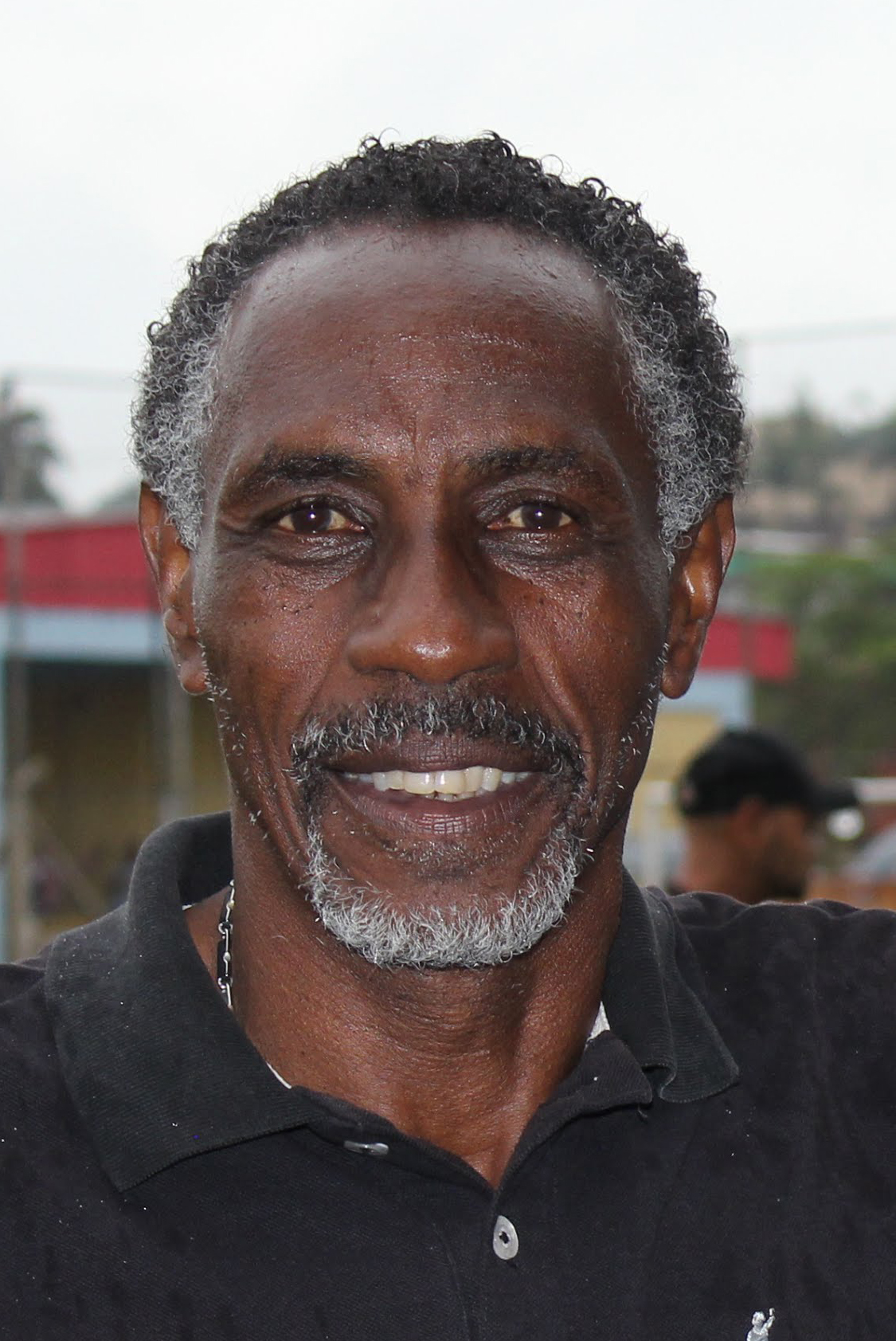
- Former player Edson Ataliba

Personal information
- Full name: Édson Ataliba Cândido
- Date of birth: 9 July 1956 (age 70)
- Place of birth: São Paulo, Brazil
- Height: 1.77 m (5 ft 10 in)
- Position: Right winger

Youth career
- –1975: Juventus-SP

Senior career*
Years	Team	Apps	(Gls)
1975–1982	Juventus-SP	164	(62)
1975	→ Catanduvense (loan)		
1976	→ Esportiva (loan)		
1977	→ Aliança (loan)		
1978	→ Rio Claro (loan)		
1982–1984	Corinthians	136	(25)
1984–1985	Santos		
1986	Santa Cruz		
1987	Marília		
1988–1989	Guará		
1989	Sobradinho		
1990	Grêmio Maringá		
1990	Gama		
1991–1993	Grêmio Maringá		

Managerial career
- 2013–2015: CA Diadema
- * Club domestic league appearances and goals as of 1 February 2024

Édson Ataliba Cândido (born 9 July 1956), simply known as Ataliba, is a Brazilian former professional footballer who played as a right winger.

== Career ==
A skilled winger, Ataliba gained notoriety playing for CA Juventus, being the team's highlight mainly in games against the big clubs in the state of São Paulo, especially versus Corinthians, a club he would defend in 1982 and would become an idol, becoming champion of the state in 1982 and 1983. He would become champion once again with Santos FC, this time as a reserve. Unable to repeat the same level of performances, he played for several clubs until retiring in 1993.

== Honours ==
Corinthians

- Campeonato Paulista: 1982, 1983

Santos

- Campeonato Paulista: 1984
