= Carlos Alberto Solito =

Brazilian footballer

Solitinho
Personal information
- Full name: Carlos Alberto Solito
- Date of birth: 26 December 1959
- Place of birth: São Paulo, Brazil
- Date of death: 21 November 2016 (aged 58)
- Place of death: São Paulo, Brazil
- Position: Goalkeeper

Youth career
- –1977: Corinthians

Senior career*
Years	Team	Apps	(Gls)
1978–1982	Corinthians	34	(0)
1981	→ Grêmio Maringá (loan)		
1983–1985	Santo André		
1986	União Barbarense		
1987	Inter de Limeira		
1987	União Barbarense		
1988	Inter de Limeira		
1989–1990	XV de Piracicaba		
1991	AD Guarulhos		
1992	Nacional-SP		
1993	São Caetano		
1994	Sãocarlense		

International career
1979	Brazil U20		
1979	Brazil Olympic	1	(0)
Medal record
Men's Football
Representing Brazil
Pan American Games
Winner	1979 San Juan
- * Club domestic league appearances and goals as of 23 November 2023

Carlos Alberto Solito (26 December 1959 – 21 November 2016), also known as Solitinho, was a Brazilian professional footballer who played as a goalkeeper.

== Career ==
Solito younger brother, he lived in his brother's shadow at SC Corinthians, being an immediate reserve on some occasions. He was part of the state champion squad in 1982 and later played for other teams in the state of São Paulo.

After retiring, he became a goalkeeper coach for Corinthians youth teams, working with successful goalkeepers such as Rubinho and Yamada.

== International career ==
Solitinho was part of the Olympic team of Brazil in 1979, being champion of the San Juan Pan American Games, and of the 1980 CONMEBOL Pre-Olympic Tournament this time without repeating the success and not qualifying for Moscow.

== Honours ==
Brazil Olympic

- Pan American Games: (gold) 1979

Corinthians

- Campeonato Paulista: 1982

== Death ==
Away from football since 2015, Solitinho died on 21 November 2016, victim of nasal cancer that spread to metastasis.
