= 1984 Campeonato Brasileiro Série B =

Campeonato Brasileiro Série B
- Season: 1984
- Champions: Uberlândia (1st title)
- Promoted: Uberlândia; Remo
- Matches: 62
- Goals: 142 (2.29 per match)
- Top goalscorer: Dadinho (Remo) - 7 goals
- Biggest home win: Uberlândia 3-0 Nacional de Itumbiara (February 25, 1984); Volta Redonda 3-0 América-MG (February 29, 1984); Remo 3-0 Inter de Santa Maria (March 24, 1984)
- Biggest away win: Botafogo-PB 0-4 Uberlândia (March 21, 1984)
- Longest winning run: Remo (4 matches)
- Longest unbeaten run: Remo; Uberlândia (8 matches)

The 1984 Campeonato Brasileiro Série B, officially, the Taça CBF, was the 7th edition of the Campeonato Brasileiro Série B. The championship was disputed by 32 clubs in a knockout tournament form. the champion would be promoted to the Third phase of the Copa Brasil of that year, and the champions, along with the runner up, would have berths in the First level championship of the next year. Uberlândia won the title, beating Remo in the finals.

== First phase ==
Team 1	Agg.	Team 2	1st leg	2nd leg
Sergipe	1–2	(Pernambuco) Sport Recife	0–0	1–2
Remo (Pará)	3–2	(Amazonas (Brazilian state)) Rio Negro	2–0	1–2
Guarani (São Paulo (state))	8–4	(Santa Catarina (state)) Avaí	3–2	5–2
XV de Piracicaba (São Paulo (state))	4–2	(Rio Grande do Sul) Novo Hamburgo	4–0	3–2
Uberlândia (Minas Gerais)	4–2	(Goiás) Nacional de Itumbiara	3–0	1–2
Inter de Santa Maria (Rio Grande do Sul)	1–1(p)	(Paraná (state)) União Bandeirante	1–1	0–0
América-MG (Minas Gerais)	2–3	(Rio de Janeiro (state)) Volta Redonda	2–1	0–3
Atlético de Alagoinhas (Bahia)	2–4	(Pernambuco) Central	2–2	0–2
Desportiva (Espírito Santo)	3–1	(Rio de Janeiro (state)) Goytacaz	1–1	2–0
Tiradentes-PI (Piauí)	1–2	Maranhão	0–0	1–2
Ceará	3–2	(Rio Grande do Norte) América-RN	3–1	0–1
Icasa (Ceará)	2–3	(Paraíba) Botafogo-PB	1–2	1–1
ASA (Alagoas)	4–4(p)	(Bahia) Itabuna	2–0	2–4
Campo Grande (Rio de Janeiro (state))	1–3	(Paraná (state)) Pinheiros	0–1	1–2
União Rondonópolis (Mato Grosso)	0–2	(Mato Grosso do Sul) Comercial-MS	0–1	0–1
Tiradentes-DF (Federal District (Brazil))	1–3	(Goiás) Itumbiara	1–1	0–2

== Round of 16 ==
Team 1	Agg.	Team 2	1st leg	2nd leg
Itabuna (Bahia)	1–1(p)	(Paraná (state)) Pinheiros	0–0	1–1
Inter de Santa Maria (Rio Grande do Sul)	3–0	(Rio de Janeiro (state)) Volta Redonda	1–0	2–0
Botafogo-PB (Paraíba)	4–2	(Pernambuco) Sport Recife	2–2	2–0
Desportiva (Espírito Santo)	3–3(p)	(Mato Grosso do Sul) Comercial-MS	2–1	1–2
Remo (Pará)	3–1	Maranhão	1–0	2–1
Itumbiara (Goiás)	3–2	(São Paulo (state)) XV de Piracicaba	2–1	1–1
Uberlândia (Minas Gerais)	1–0	(São Paulo (state)) Guarani	0–0	1–0
Ceará	1–1(p)	(Pernambuco) Central	0–0	1–1

== Quarterfinals ==
Team 1	Agg.	Team 2	1st leg	2nd leg
Itabuna (Bahia)	2–4	(Paraíba) Botafogo-PB	2–2	0–2
Inter de Santa Maria (Rio Grande do Sul)	3–1	(Pernambuco) Central	2–0	1–1
Comercial-MS (Mato Grosso do Sul)	3–4	(Pará) Remo	1–1	2–3
Itumbiara (Goiás)	2–3	(Minas Gerais) Uberlândia	1–2	1–1

== Semifinals ==
Team 1	Agg.	Team 2	1st leg	2nd leg
Inter de Santa Maria (Rio Grande do Sul)	0–3	(Pará) Remo	0–0	0–3
Botafogo-PB (Paraíba)	0–6	(Minas Gerais) Uberlândia	0–4	0–2

== Finals ==
Team 1	Agg.	Team 2	1st leg	2nd leg
Uberlândia (Minas Gerais)	1–0	(Pará) Remo	1–0	0–0

== Sources ==
- RSSSF
