= Bira Burro =

Brazilian footballer

Personal information
- Full name: Ubiratã Silva do Espírito Santo
- Date of birth: 20 May 1955
- Place of birth: Macapá, Brazil
- Date of death: 14 September 2020 (aged 65)
- Place of death: Macapá, Brazil
- Position: Forward

Youth career
- 1967–1970: Reminho
- 1970–1972: Macapá

Senior career*
Years	Team	Apps	(Gls)
1973–1976	Macapá		
1974	→ Tuna Luso (loan)		
1976–1977	Paysandu		
1977–1979	Remo		
1979–1982	Internacional		
1980–1981	→ Tecos UAG (loan)		
1982	Atlético Mineiro		
1983	Juventus-SP		
1984	Novo Hamburgo		
1984	Aimoré		
1984	Náutico		
1985	Remo		
1985	Brasil de Pelotas		
1986	Central		
1986	Guadalajara		
1987	Brasil de Pelotas		
1988	Tiradentes-CE		
1988	Remo		
1989	Vila Nova-PA		

Managerial career
- 1991: Pinheirense
- 1992: Sport Belém
- 1993: Pinheirense
- 1993: Tuna Luso
- 1994: Paysandu
- 1995: Bragantino-PA
- 1995: Tuna Luso
- 1996: Bragantino-PA
- 1998: Sport Belém
- 1999: Castanhal
- 2000: Tuna Luso
- 2002: Remo
- 2004–2005: Amapá
- * Club domestic league appearances and goals as of 14 May 2024

Ubiratã Silva do Espírito Santo (20 May 1955 – 14 September 2020), better known as Bira Burro, was a Brazilian professional footballer and manager, who played as a forward.

== Career ==
Born in the state of Amapá, Bira Burro began his career at EC Macapá, where he became the regional champion of the Amazon in 1975. He made history primarily with Clube do Remo, winning three state championships, and with SC Internacional, where he was part of the national championship team in 1979. He was nicknamed "burro" (English: donkey) in Pará football due to the frequent confusion he caused during radio interviews.

== Personal life ==
Bira is brother of the also footballer Aldo.

== Honours ==
Macapá

- Torneio Integração da Amazônia: 1975

Remo

- Campeonato Paraense: 1977, 1978, 1979

Internacional

- Campeonato Brasileiro: 1979
- Campeonato Gaúcho: 1981

Atlético Mineiro

- Campeonato Mineiro: 1982

Náutico

- Campeonato Pernambucano: 1984

Individual

- Campeonato Paraense top scorer: 1978, 1979

== Death ==
Bira died on 14 September 2020, victim from liver cancer.
