= Goulart =

Goulart is a Portuguese-language surname of Flemish roots, derived from Lodewijk Govaert, migrant to the Azores, where he came to be known as Luis Govarte. His descendants later migrated to the Americas, where the surname became well known: Goulart. The surname is frequent in Portugal, and in Brazil.

== Introduction ==
Although the sound suggests a French origin, the surname Goulart has its origins in Flanders. The word derives from the Germanic guda-frihu, godsvrede, and meant "the Peace of God", which corresponded, properly speaking, to a truce imposed by the Catholic Church, to the wars – seemingly endless in the 14th and 15th centuries – during religious festivities.

At that time, the Illustrious Generation was committed to occupying the Azores with "any colonists, as long as they were Christians". The captaincy of Terceira Island had already been granted to the Flemish Jácome de Bruges.

In this context, the Infanta of Portugal married Philip III, the powerful Duke of Burgundy. As duchess, Dª Isabella of Portugal provided significant incentive for the migration of Flanders to the Azores, on the one hand promoting Portuguese colonization of those islands, on the other alleviating the harmful side effects of the Hundred Years' War.

One of these migrants was Lodewijk Govaert, a leading figure in the cultivation and industrialization of isatis tinctoria (a plant popularly known as pastel), producing producing a valuable dye, widely used by the textile industry in the 14th and 15th centuries. In the Azores, Lodewijk Govaert became known as Luis Govarte; later his surname was standardized as Goulart. The only flemish migrant to the Azores whose surname was Govaert was Lodewijk, so that all Goularts in the Azores and the Americas are direct descendants of him.

== Etymology ==
In his Dictionary of Surnames of Belgium and Northern France, Dr. Frans Debranbandere points out the meaning of the surname Govaert: the word comes from the Germanic guda-frihu, godsvrede, also used in Latin (Pax Dei), French (la Paix de Dieu) or in English (Peace and Truce of God). It is a truce imposed by the Church on the feast days of the Roman Catholic apostolic calendar, as a way of limiting the outbreak of private wars so frequent with the collapse of the Carolingian Empire. This measure was deliberated at the Council of Charroux (Aquitaine, 989). Violation of the truce could imply severe religious consequences, imposed by God or the Church, such as excommunication.

When migrating to the Azores, the surname was adapted to the Portuguese language. First, "the e, which sounded too strong, disappeared", and the spellings Govarte and Gouvarte were found, since the v and u "were identical values", but the t was kept. Then the v was dropped, "influenced by the phonetics of least effort"; then the l appeared to break the sequence of 3 vowels, and records with the spellings Goularte and Goulart were found. It was up to Father Francisco Vieira Goulart to standardize the spelling, knowing that, at that time, baptismal records, before the Catholic Church, served as a public record of births.

Notable people with the surname include:

- Lodewijk Govaert (born 1445), flemish migrant to the Azores
- Antonio da Silveira Goulart (born 1696), azorean migrant to Brazil
- Alexandre Goulart (born 1976), Brazilian footballer
- Gefferson da Silva Goulart (born 1978), Brazilian footballer
- Izabel Goulart (born 1984), Brazilian model
- João Goulart (1918–1976), Brazilian politician and president
- João Goulart (footballer) (born 2000), Portuguese footballer
- Luiz Bombonato Goulart (born 1975), Brazilian footballer
- Maria Teresa Fontela Goulart (born 1940), former Brazilian first lady
- Mário Goulart Lino, Portuguese footballer
- Paulo Goulart (1933–2014), Brazilian actor
- Paulo Goulart (footballer) (1955–2023), Brazilian footballer
- Ricardo Goulart (born 1991), Brazilian-born Chinese footballer
- Ron Goulart (1933–2022), American writer and critic
- Simon Goulart (1543–1628), French Reformed theologian
- Walter de Souza Goulart (1912–1951), Brazilian footballer

== See also ==
- Evelina M. Goulart (schooner), fishing schooner
