= Orlando Lelé =

Brazilian footballer and manager

Orlando
Personal information
- Full name: Orlando Pereira
- Date of birth: 22 January 1949
- Place of birth: Santos, Brazil
- Date of death: 4 September 1999 (aged 50)
- Place of death: São Vicente, Brazil
- Position: Right back

Youth career
- Santos

Senior career*
| Years | Team | Apps | (Gls) |
| 1970–1973 | Santos | 46 | (2) |
| 1973 | Coritiba | 59 | (3) |
| 1974–1976 | America-RJ | 52 | (11) |
| 1977–1981 | Vasco da Gama | 90 | (7) |
| 1981–1982 | Udinese | 23 | (0) |
| 1982 | Coritiba | 10 | (2) |

International career
| 1976–1977 | Brazil | 6 | (0) |

Managerial career
- 1990–1991: Gama
- 1991: Atlético Goianiense
- 1992: Anapolina
- 1992–1993: Goiatuba
- 1993: Goiás
- 1994–1995: Goiatuba
- 1996: Santos
- 1997: Gama
- 1997: Vila Nova
- * Club domestic league appearances and goals

Orlando Pereira (22 January 1949 – 4 September 1999), known as Orlando Lelé as a player and Orlando Amarelo as a manager, or simply Orlando, was a Brazilian retired footballer and manager. He played as a right back.

== Honours ==
=== Player ===
Coritiba

- Campeonato Paraense: 1973

Vasco da Gama

- Campeonato Carioca: 1977

=== Manager ===
Goiatuba

- Campeonato Goiano: 1992
