= Corinthians Democracy =

Ideological movement in Brazil

The Corinthians Democracy (Portuguese: Democracia Corinthiana) was an ideological football movement of the early 1980s in Brazil. It arose in the Sport Club Corinthians Paulista team. It introduced an innovative way to manage a club. It was recognized in Brazil as one of the most important actions in the struggle against dictatorship. At the time, it was a challenge to the military government. It was an idealistic but effective political cell that fought against the authoritarian way the club's management controlled its players, a microcosm of the way the country was governed by the military. It is the only movement of this nature related to a football club at the time.

Led by the cultured midfield maestro Sócrates and by fullback Wladimir, and with the consent of club president Waldemar Pires, the squad players took control over the management of the team Sport Club Corinthians Paulista. Sócrates, together with teammate Wladimir, organised the players to discuss and then vote with a simple show of hands on all matters that affected them, ranging from what time they would eat lunch to challenging the concentração, a common practice in Brazil where players were practically locked in a hotel for one or two days before a game. One of the most notable decisions they made was, in 1982, having "Vote on 15th" printed on the back of their shirts to motivate fans to vote in the first Brazilian multiparty election since the 1964 military coup.

In those years Corinthians won two Campeonatos Paulistas: 1982 and 1983. In 1984, Sócrates revived a contact offer from Fiorentina. Despite the offer, the player was willing to stay in Corinthians if Congress approved the Constitutional Amendment introduced by Dante de Oliveira, which would restore direct elections for President. It did not pass, so the most important leader of Democracy left Corinthians.

Its motto was: "Ganhar ou perder, mas sempre com democracia" ("Win or lose, but always with democracy").

The movement had the backing of artists and intellectuals, such as senior media creative Washington Olivetto, who coined the term Democracia Corintiana. Eventually, the government reacted, as Brigadier Jerônimo Bastos, head of the Brazilian Sports Confederation (Portuguese: Confederação Brasileira de Desportos) warned the club for interfering in political affairs.
