= Ivan (footballer, born 1955) =

Brazilian footballer

Personal information
- Full name: Ivan César Silva Machado
- Date of birth: 2 March 1955 (age 71)
- Place of birth: Lins, Brazil
- Height: 1.80 m (5 ft 11 in)
- Position: Centre-back

Senior career*
Years	Team	Apps	(Gls)
1974–1976	Araçatuba		
1977–1979	XV de Piracicaba		
1979–1985	Vasco da Gama	289	(2)
1983	→ Náutico (loan)		
1986–1988	Santa Cruz		
1988–1992	Beira-Mar		
- * Club domestic league appearances and goals

Ivan César Silva Machado (born 2 March 1955), simply known as Ivan, is a Brazilian former professional footballer who played as a centre-back.

== Career ==
Ivan played for Araçatuba, XV de Piracicaba, Vasco da Gama, Náutico, Santa Cruz and Beira-Mar. At Vasco, he was part of the state champion squad in 1982, and won the Silver Ball in 1984, in addition to the second Pernambuco championship in 1986 and 1987 with Santa Cruz. He later lived in the city of Olinda, Pernambuco, where he is pastor of a church.

== Honours ==
Vasco da Gama

- Campeonato Carioca: 1982
- Taça Rio: 1984
- Trofeo Ciudad de Sevilla: 1979
- Festa d'Elx Trophy: 1979
- Trofeo Colombino: 1980
- Torneio Madeira Autonomia: 1981
- Torneio de Verão do Uruguai: 1982

Santa Cruz

- Campeonato Pernambucano: 1986, 1987

Individual

- 1984 Bola de Prata
