= 1983 Campeonato Paulista =

Season of São Paulo's football league

Campeonato Paulista – Série A1
- Season: 1983
- Champions: Corinthians
- Relegated: São José
- Copa Brasil: Corinthians; São Paulo; Santos; Palmeiras; Portuguesa; Santo André
- Matches played: 410
- Goals scored: 780 (1.9 per match)
- Top goalscorer: Serginho Chulapa (Santos) – 22 goals
- Biggest home win: Taubaté 4-0 América (June 19, 1983); Portuguesa 4-0 XV de Jaú (June 29, 1983); Palmeiras 4-0 XV de Jaú (July 13, 1983); Santos 4-0 Esporte Clube São Bento (July 21, 1983); Ferroviária 5-1 Taubaté (July 24, 1983); Palmeiras 5-1 Taquaritinga (August 4, 1983); Inter de Limeira 5-1 XV de Jaú (August 7, 1983); Santo André 4-0 Juventus (August 28, 1983); Guarani 4-0 XV de Jaú (October 19, 1983); São José 4-0 Marília (October 23, 1983); Santos 5-1 Inter de Limeira (October 25, 1983)
- Biggest away win: São José 0-5 Portuguesa (June 15, 1983)
- Highest scoring: Marília 5-2 Ponte Preta (June 12, 1983)

The 1983 Campeonato Paulista da Primeira Divisão de Futebol Profissional da Série A1 was the 82nd season of São Paulo's top professional football league. Corinthians won the championship for the 19th time. São José was relegated.

== Championship ==
The twenty teams of the championship were divided into four groups of five teams, with each team playing twice against all other teams, and the two best teams of each group passing to the Second phase, and the team with the fewest points out of all the twenty being relegated.

In the second phase, the eight remaining teams would be divided into two groups of four, each team playing twice against the teams of its own group and the two best teams of each group qualifying to the Semifinals.

=== First phase ===
==== Group A ====
Pos	Team	Pld	W	D	L	GF	GA	GD	Pts	Qualification or relegation
1	Santos	38	17	14	7	54	34	+20	48	Qualified
2	Ponte Preta	38	13	12	13	41	38	+3	38	Qualified
3	Marília	38	9	17	12	32	39	−7	35	
4	Juventus	38	9	16	13	34	43	−9	34	
5	São José	38	7	16	15	25	38	−13	30	Relegated

Updated to match(es) played on November 6, 1983. Source: RSSSF.com
Rules for classification: 1) points; 2) wins; 3) goal difference; 4) number of goals scored.

==== Group B ====
Pos	Team	Pld	W	D	L	GF	GA	GD	Pts	Qualification or relegation
1	Corinthians	38	19	12	7	55	35	+20	50	Qualified
2	São Bento	38	10	17	11	23	29	−6	37	Qualified
3	Taquaritinga	38	11	12	15	31	42	−11	34	
4	Botafogo	38	9	16	13	35	41	−6	34	
5	Ferroviária	38	9	14	15	35	41	−6	32	

Updated to match(es) played on November 6, 1983. Source: RSSSF.com
Rules for classification: 1) points; 2) wins; 3) goal difference; 4) number of goals scored.

==== Group C ====
Pos	Team	Pld	W	D	L	GF	GA	GD	Pts	Qualification or relegation
1	São Paulo	38	19	14	5	56	30	+26	52	Qualified
2	Portuguesa	38	16	12	10	38	24	+14	44	Qualified
3	Inter de Limeira	38	9	16	13	34	40	−6	34	
4	XV de Jaú	38	10	11	17	22	46	−24	31	
5	Taubaté	38	9	13	16	28	37	−9	31	

Updated to match(es) played on November 6, 1983. Source: RSSSF.com
Rules for classification: 1) points; 2) wins; 3) goal difference; 4) number of goals scored.

==== Group D ====
Pos	Team	Pld	W	D	L	GF	GA	GD	Pts	Qualification or relegation
1	Santo André	38	15	17	6	30	20	+10	47	Qualified
2	Palmeiras	38	12	21	5	44	28	+16	45	Qualified
3	América	38	11	15	12	29	37	−8	37	
4	Comercial	38	10	15	13	29	31	−2	35	
5	Guarani	38	10	12	16	41	43	−2	32	

Updated to match(es) played on November 6, 1983. Source: RSSSF.com
Rules for classification: 1) points; 2) wins; 3) goal difference; 4) number of goals scored.

=== Second phase ===
==== Group E ====
Pos	Team	Pld	W	D	L	GF	GA	GD	Pts	Qualification or relegation
1	Corinthians	6	3	3	0	9	2	+7	9	Qualified
2	Santos	6	3	3	0	8	3	+5	9	Qualified
3	Ponte Preta	6	1	1	4	6	11	−5	3	
4	São Bento	6	1	1	4	3	10	−7	3	

Updated to match(es) played on December 1, 1983. Source: RSSSF.com
Rules for classification: 1) points; 2) wins; 3) goal difference; 4) number of goals scored.

==== Group F ====
Pos	Team	Pld	W	D	L	GF	GA	GD	Pts	Qualification or relegation
1	São Paulo	6	4	2	0	10	5	+5	10	Qualified
2	Palmeiras	6	2	3	1	8	5	+3	7	Qualified
3	Portuguesa	6	2	2	2	7	10	−3	6	
4	Santo André	6	0	1	5	2	7	−5	1	

Updated to match(es) played on December 6, 1983. Source: RSSSF.com
Rules for classification: 1) points; 2) wins; 3) goal difference; 4) number of goals scored.

=== Semifinals ===
Team 1	Agg.	Team 2	1st leg	2nd leg
São Paulo	3–2	Santos	2–1	1–1
Palmeiras	1–2	Corinthians	1–1	0–1

=== Finals ===
Team 1	Agg.	Team 2	1st leg	2nd leg
Corinthians	2–1	São Paulo	1–0	1–1
