= Daniel González (Uruguayan footballer) =

Uruguayan footballer (1954-1985)

Personal information
- Full name: Daniel Ángel González Puga
- Date of birth: 22 December 1954
- Place of birth: Montevideo, Uruguay
- Date of death: 1 February 1985 (aged 30)
- Place of death: Rio de Janeiro, Brazil
- Height: 1.82 m (5 ft 11 1/2 in)
- Position: Defender

Senior career*
Years	Team	Apps	(Gls)
1974–1979	Fénix		
1979–1981	Portuguesa	21	(4)
1982–1983	Corinthians	20	(0)
1983–1985	Vasco	26	(0)
- * Club domestic league appearances and goals

Daniel Ángel González Puga or simply Daniel González (22 December 1954- 1 February 1985), was an Uruguayan football defender who played for several top-level clubs in Uruguay and in Brazil.

== Career ==
Born in Montevideo, Daniel González started his career in 1974, playing for Fénix., leaving the club in 1979 to play for Portuguesa in Brazil. He scored four goals in the 21 Série A games he played for Portuguesa between 1979 and 1981. He was part of the Corinthians squad that won the Campeonato Paulista in 1982, leaving the club in 1983, after playing 20 Série A games for the club. Daniel González was transferred to Vasco in 1983, playing 26 more Série A games between that year and 1985.

== Death ==
Daniel González died on 1 February 1985, in a car accident in Rio de Janeiro, Brazil.

== Honors ==
=== Club ===
Corinthians

- Campeonato Paulista: 1982
