= 1983 Campeonato Carioca =

Campeonato Carioca
- Season: 1983
- Champions: Fluminense
- Relegated: São Cristóvão; Bonsucesso
- Taça de Ouro: Fluminense; Flamengo; Vasco da Gama; Bangu; América; Botafogo
- Taça de Prata: Volta Redonda; Goytacaz
- Matches played: 135
- Goals scored: 289 (2.14 per match)
- Top goalscorer: Luisinho Lemos (América) - 22 goals
- Biggest home win: Bangu 7-0 São Cristóvão (November 13, 1983)
- Biggest away win: São Cristóvão 0-5 América (November 20, 1983)
- Highest scoring: Bangu 6-2 Flamengo (September 7, 1984)

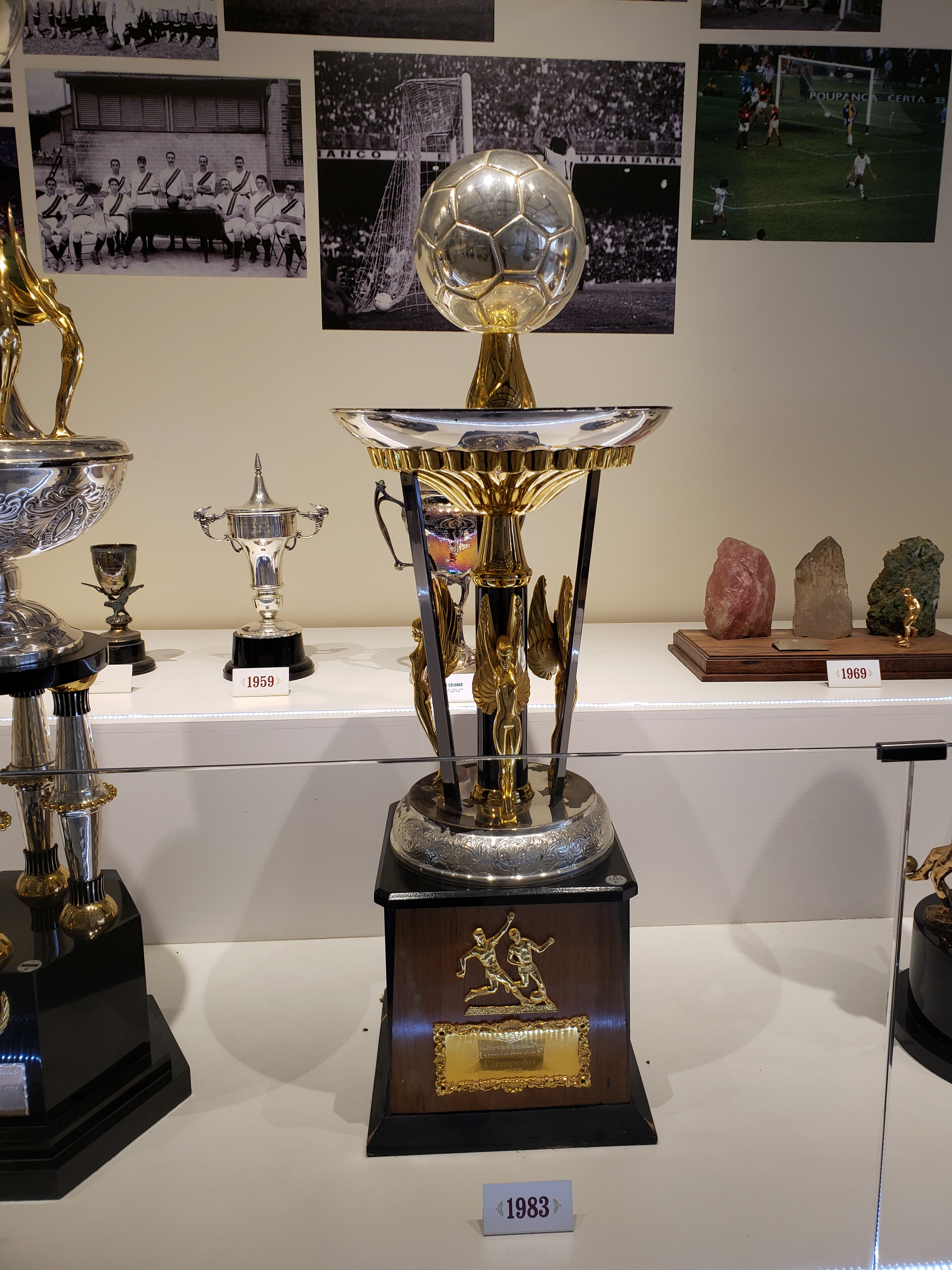

The 1983 edition of the Campeonato Carioca kicked off on July 2, 1983 and ended on December 14, 1983. It is the official tournament organized by FFERJ (Federação de Futebol do Estado do Rio de Janeiro, or Rio de Janeiro State Football Federation. Only clubs based in the Rio de Janeiro State are allowed to play. Twelve teams contested this edition. Fluminense won the title for the 25th time. São Cristóvão and Bonsucesso were relegated.

== System ==
The tournament would be divided in three stages:

- Taça Guanabara: The twelve teams all played in a single round-robin format against each other. The champions qualified to the Final phase.
- Taça Rio: The twelve teams all played in a single round-robin format against each other. The champions qualified to the Final phase.
- Final phase: The champions of the two stages, plus the team with the best overall record would play that phase. each team played in a single round-robin format against each other and the team with the most points won the title.

== Championship ==
=== Taça Guanabara ===
Pos	Team	Pld	W	D	L	GF	GA	GD	Pts	Qualification or relegation
1	Fluminense	11	9	2	0	20	3	+17	20	Qualified to Final phase
2	América	11	7	2	2	18	13	+5	16	
3	Bangu	11	6	3	2	19	10	+9	15	
4	Botafogo	11	4	6	1	16	10	+6	14	
5	Goytacaz	11	4	3	4	18	14	+4	11	
6	Flamengo	11	4	2	5	15	17	−2	10	
7	Vasco da Gama	11	3	4	4	11	12	−1	10	
8	Volta Redonda	11	3	4	4	11	16	−5	10	
9	Campo Grande	11	2	5	4	5	9	−4	9	
10	Americano	11	2	4	5	4	11	−7	8	
11	Bonsucesso	11	1	6	4	9	13	−4	8	
12	São Cristóvão	11	0	1	10	2	19	−17	1	

Updated to match(es) played on October 5, 1983. Source: RSSSF.com
Rules for classification: 1) points; 2) wins; 3) goal difference; 4) number of goals scored.

=== Taça Rio ===
Pos	Team	Pld	W	D	L	GF	GA	GD	Pts	Qualification or relegation
1	Flamengo	11	9	0	2	23	6	+17	18	Playoffs
2	Bangu	11	8	2	1	22	6	+16	18	Playoffs
3	América	11	6	3	2	20	8	+12	15	
4	Goytacaz	11	5	2	4	8	10	−2	12	
5	Americano	11	3	5	3	8	9	−1	11	
6	Campo Grande	11	3	5	3	7	9	−2	11	
7	Vasco da Gama	11	3	4	4	12	12	0	10	
8	Botafogo	11	2	6	3	7	8	−1	10	
9	Volta Redonda	11	3	3	5	10	13	−3	9	
10	Fluminense	11	3	3	5	9	11	−2	9	
11	Bonsucesso	11	2	2	7	10	18	−8	6	
12	São Cristóvão	11	0	3	8	0	26	−26	3	

Updated to match(es) played on November 27, 1983. Source: RSSSF.com
Rules for classification: 1) points; 2) wins; 3) goal difference; 4) number of goals scored.

==== Playoffs ====
Team 1	Score	Team 2
Flamengo	1–0	Bangu

=== Aggregate table ===
Pos	Team	Pld	W	D	L	GF	GA	GD	Pts	Qualification or relegation
1	Bangu	22	14	5	3	41	16	+25	33	Qualified to Final phase
2	América	22	13	5	4	38	21	+17	31	
3	Fluminense	22	12	5	5	29	14	+15	29	
4	Flamengo	22	13	2	7	38	24	+14	28	
5	Botafogo	22	6	12	4	23	18	+5	24	
6	Goytacaz	22	9	5	8	26	24	+2	23	
7	Vasco da Gama	22	6	8	8	23	24	−1	20	
8	Campo Grande	22	5	10	7	12	18	−6	20	
9	Volta Redonda	22	6	7	9	21	29	−8	19	
10	Americano	22	5	9	8	12	20	−8	19	
11	Bonsucesso	22	3	8	11	19	31	−12	14	Relegated
12	São Cristóvão	22	0	4	18	2	45	−43	4	Relegated

Updated to match(es) played on November 27, 1983. Source: RSSSF.com
Rules for classification: 1) points; 2) wins; 3) goal difference; 4) number of goals scored.

=== Finals ===
Pos	Team	Pld	W	D	L	GF	GA	GD	Pts	Qualification or relegation
1	Fluminense	2	1	1	0	2	1	+1	3	Champions
2	Flamengo	2	1	0	1	2	1	+1	2	
3	Bangu	2	0	1	1	1	3	−2	1	

Updated to match(es) played on December 14, 1983. Source: RSSSF.com
Rules for classification: 1) points; 2) wins; 3) goal difference; 4) number of goals scored.
