= Assis (footballer, born 1952) =

Brazilian footballer

Personal information
- Full name: Benedito de Assis Silva
- Date of birth: November 12, 1952
- Place of birth: São Paulo, Brazil
- Date of death: July 6, 2014 (aged 61)
- Place of death: Curitiba, Brazil
- Position: Forward

Senior career*
Years	Team	Apps	(Gls)
1980	São Paulo	31	(5)
1981	Internacional	7	(4)
1982	Atlético Paranaense	23	(5)
1983–1987	Fluminense	65	(19)

International career
1984	Brazil	2	(0)
- * Club domestic league appearances and goals

Benedito de Assis Silva (November 12, 1952 – July 6, 2014), commonly known as Assis, was a Brazilian footballer who achieved fame playing for Fluminense. He made two appearances for the Brazil national team in 1984. More recently he was working as a manager for Fluminense's youth team.

Assis died on July 6, 2014, due to multiple organ failure at the age of 61.

== Honours ==
São Paulo

- Campeonato Paulista: 1980

Internacional

- Campeonato Gaúcho: 1981

Atlético Paranaense

- Campeonato Paranaense: 1982

Fluminense

- Campeonato Carioca: 1983, 1984, 1985
- Campeonato Brasileiro Série A: 1984
