= Paulo Vítor (footballer, born 1957) =

Brazilian footballer

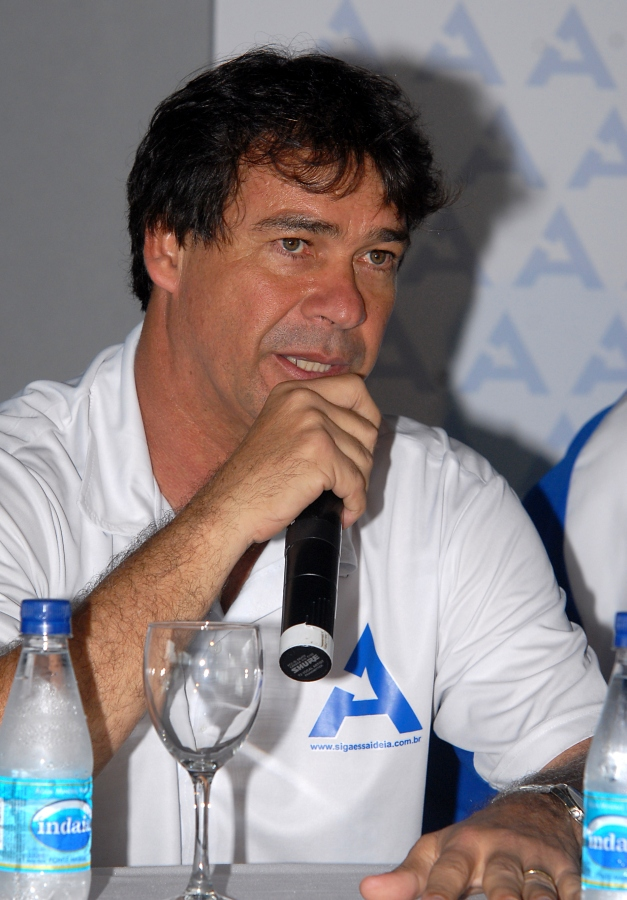

Personal information
- Full name: Paulo Vítor Barbosa de Carvalho
- Date of birth: June 7, 1957 (age 69)
- Place of birth: Belém, Brazil
- Height: 1.82 m (6 ft 0 in)

Senior career*
Years	Team	Apps	(Gls)
1974–1976	CEUB		
1977	CEOV		
1978	Brasília	16	(0)
1978	Vila Nova-GO		
1979–1980	Vitória-ES		
1981–1988	Fluminense	463	(0)
1988–1989	América-RJ	8	(0)
1989–1990	Coritiba		
1990–1991	Sport Recife	10	(0)
1990–1991	São José		
1992	Remo		
1993	Paysandu		
1994	Volta Redonda		

International career
1984–1986	Brazil	9	(0)
- * Club domestic league appearances and goals

Paulo Vítor Barbosa de Carvalho (born June 7, 1957, in Belém), best known as Paulo Vítor, is a former Brazilian football (soccer) goalkeeper.

During his career (1974–1994) he played for CEUB, Operário de Várzea Grande, Brasília, Vila Nova-GO, Vitória-ES, Fluminense, América-RJ, Coritiba, Sport Recife, São José, Grêmio de Maringá, Remo Pará, Paysandu and Volta Redonda. He won two Campeonato Brasileiro in 1978 and 1984, three consecutive Rio de Janeiro State Championship (1983, 1984, 1985) and one Mato Grosso State Tournament in 1977.

For the Brazil national football team he played in nine matches, June 1984 to April 1986, and was on the roster for the 1986 FIFA World Cup as a reserve.
