= 1977 in Brazilian football =

Football in Brazil
- Season: 1977

The following article presents a summary of the 1977 football (soccer) season in Brazil, which was the 76th season of competitive football in the country.

== Campeonato Brasileiro Série A ==
Semifinals

Team 1	Agg.	Team 2	1st leg	2nd leg
Londrina	4-6	Atlético Mineiro	2-2	2-4
Operário-CG	1-3	São Paulo	1-0	0-3

Final

March 5, 1978

Atlético Mineiro	0–0 (0–0 after extra time, 2–3 pen)	São Paulo

Mineirão

São Paulo declared as the Campeonato Brasileiro champions.

== State championship champions ==
State	Champion	State	Champion
Acre	Juventus-AC	Pará	Remo
Alagoas	CRB	Paraíba	Botafogo-PB
Amapá	Guarany-AP	Paraná	Grêmio Maringá
Amazonas	Nacional	Pernambuco	Sport Recife
Bahia	Bahia	Piauí	River
Ceará	Ceará	Rio de Janeiro	Manufatora
Distrito Federal	Brasília	Rio Grande do Norte	América-RN
Espírito Santo	Desportiva	Rio Grande do Sul	Grêmio
Goiás	Vila Nova	Rondônia	Moto Clube
Guanabara	Vasco	Roraima	São Raimundo-RR
Maranhão	Moto Club	Santa Catarina	Chapecoense
Mato Grosso	Operário-CG	São Paulo	Corinthians
Mato Grosso do Sul	-	Sergipe	Confiança
Minas Gerais	Cruzeiro	Tocantins	-

== Youth competition champions ==
Competition	Champion
Copa São Paulo de Juniores	Fluminense

== Other competition champions ==
Competition	Champion
Taça Minas Gerais	Villa Nova
Torneio de Integração da Amazônia	Moto Clube

== Brazilian clubs in international competitions ==
Team	Copa Libertadores 1977
Corinthians	Group stage
Cruzeiro	Runner-up
Internacional	Semifinals

== Brazil national team ==
The following table lists all the games played by the Brazil national football team in official competitions and friendly matches during 1977.

Date	Opposition	Result	Score	Brazil scorers	Competition
January 23, 1977	Bulgaria	W	1-0	Roberto Dinamite	International Friendly
January 25, 1977	(São Paulo (state)) São Paulo State Combined Team	W	2-0	Gil, Palhinha	International Friendly (unofficial match)
January 30, 1977	(Rio de Janeiro (state)) Fla-Flu Combined Team	D	1-1	Palhinha	International Friendly (unofficial match)
February 6, 1977	(Colombia) Millonarios	W	2-0	Zico, Roberto Dinamite	International Friendly (unofficial match)
February 20, 1977	Colombia	D	0-0	-	World Cup Qualifying
March 3, 1977	(Rio de Janeiro (state)) Vasco-Botafogo Combined Team	W	6-1	Roberto Dinamite, Rivellino, Zico, Paulo César Caju, Nílson Dias, Orlando (own goal)	International Friendly (unofficial match)
March 9, 1977	Colombia	W	6-0	Roberto Dinamite (2), Zico, Marinho Chagas (2), Rivellino	World Cup Qualifying
March 13, 1977	Paraguay	W	1-0	Insfran (own goal)	World Cup Qualifying
March 20, 1977	Paraguay	D	1-1	Roberto Dinamite	World Cup Qualifying
June 5, 1977	(Rio de Janeiro (state)) Rio de Janeiro State Combined Team	W	4-2	Gil, Marcelo, Roberto Dinamite, Rivellino	International Friendly (unofficial match)
June 8, 1977	England	D	0-0	-	International Friendly
June 12, 1977	West Germany	D	1-1	Rivellino	International Friendly
June 16, 1977	(São Paulo (state)) São Paulo State Combined Team	D	1-1	Paulo César Caju	International Friendly (unofficial match)
June 19, 1977	Poland	W	3-1	Paulo Isidoro, Reinaldo, Rivellino	International Friendly
June 23, 1977	Scotland	W	2-0	Zico, Toninho Cerezo	International Friendly
June 26, 1977	Yugoslavia	D	0-0	-	International Friendly
June 26, 1977	France	D	2-2	Edinho, Roberto Dinamite	International Friendly
July 10, 1977	Peru	W	1-0	Gil	World Cup Qualifying
July 14, 1977	Bolivia	W	8-0	Zico (4), Roberto Dinamite, Gil, Toninho Cerezo, Marcelo	World Cup Qualifying
October 12, 1977	(Italy) Milan	W	3-0	Rivellino, Zico, Serginho Chulapa	International Friendly (unofficial match)
