= Pires (Brazilian footballer) =

Brazilian footballer

Personal information
- Full name: José Sebastião Pires Neto
- Date of birth: February 23, 1956 (age 70)
- Place of birth: Sorocaba, Brazil
- Position: Defensive midfielder

Senior career*
Years	Team	Apps	(Gls)
1972–1980	Palmeiras		
1981–1983	América (RJ)		
1983–1985	Vasco da Gama		
1986	Bahia		
1986–1987	Vitória Guimarães		
1988–1989	Belenenses		
1990–1991	Gil Vicente		
1992	Nacional (SP)		
1993	São José		
1993	Anapolina		
1994	Hyundai Horangi	11	(0)

International career^{‡}
1984	Brazil	2	(0)
- * Club domestic league appearances and goals as of 12 October 2007 ‡ National team caps and goals as of 12 October 2007

José Sebastião Pires Neto (born February 23, 1956, in Sorocaba), also known as Pires, is a former Brazilian footballer who plays as a defensive midfielder. He played for Ulsan Hyundai FC of the South Korean K League, then known as Hyundai Horangi

== Honours ==
- Campeonato Brasileiro Série A in 1972, 1973 with Palmeiras
- Campeonato Paulista in 1972, 1974, 1976 with Palmeiras
- Campeonato Baiano in 1986 with Bahia
- League Cup winners in 1994 with Hyundai Horangi
