= 1977 Campeonato Carioca =

Campeonato Carioca
- Season: 1977
- Champions: Vasco da Gama
- Copa Brasil: Vasco da Gama; Flamengo; Fluminense; América; Botafogo; Americano; Goytacaz; Volta Redonda
- Matches: 211
- Goals: 505 (2.39 per match)
- Top goalscorer: Zico (Flamengo) - 27 goals
- Biggest home win: Vasco da Gama 6-0 Bangu (April 3, 1977); Vasco da Gama 7-1 Madureira (April 17, 1977); Fluminense 6-0 América; Flamengo 7-1 Volta Redonda (May 26, 1977)
- Biggest away win: Campo Grande 0-8 Botafogo (July 23, 1977)
- Highest scoring: Vasco da Gama 7-1 Madureira (April 17, 1977); Flamengo 7-1 Volta Redonda (May 26, 1977); Campo Grande 0-8 Botafogo (July 23, 1977)

The 1977 edition of the Campeonato Carioca kicked off on March 26, 1977 and ended on September 28, 1977. It was organized by FCF (Federação Carioca de Futebol, or Carioca Football Federation). Fifteen teams contested this edition. Vasco da Gama won the title for the 14th time. no teams were relegated.

== System ==
The tournament would be divided in three stages:

- Taça Guanabara: The fifteen teams all played in a single round-robin format against each other. The champions qualified to the Finals.
- Taça Manoel do Nascimento Vargas Netto: The fifteen teams all played in a single round-robin format against each other. The champions qualified to the Finals.
- Finals: Would be disputed by the two stage winners; in case the same team won both stages, the Finals wouldn't be held.

== Championship ==
=== Taça Guanabara ===
Pos	Team	Pld	W	D	L	GF	GA	GD	Pts	Qualification or relegation
1	Vasco da Gama	14	13	0	1	40	5	+35	26	Champions
2	Flamengo	14	11	1	2	38	10	+28	23	
3	Botafogo	14	10	2	2	36	6	+30	22	
4	Fluminense	14	10	1	3	27	6	+21	21	
5	América	14	8	4	2	18	12	+6	20	
6	Bonsucesso	14	5	3	6	15	18	−3	13	
7	Bangu	14	1	10	3	11	19	−8	12	
8	São Cristóvão	14	4	3	7	14	27	−13	11	
9	Americano	14	3	5	6	15	17	−2	11	
10	Olaria	14	3	5	6	14	27	−13	11	
11	Goytacaz	14	2	6	6	8	17	−9	10	
12	Volta Redonda	14	2	4	8	8	22	−14	8	
13	Madureira	14	2	4	8	6	27	−21	8	
14	Portuguesa	14	3	1	10	7	19	−12	7	
15	Campo Grande	14	2	3	9	8	33	−25	7	

Updated to match(es) played on May 29, 1977. Source: RSSSF.com
Rules for classification: 1) points; 2) goal difference; 3) wins; 4) number of goals scored.

=== Taça Manoel do Nascimento Vargas Netto ===
Pos	Team	Pld	W	D	L	GF	GA	GD	Pts	Qualification or relegation
1	Vasco da Gama	14	12	2	0	29	0	+29	26	Playoffs
2	Flamengo	14	12	2	0	37	2	+35	26	Playoffs
3	Fluminense	14	11	1	2	30	7	+23	23	
4	Botafogo	14	8	2	4	26	10	+16	18	
5	Bangu	14	8	0	6	17	14	+3	16	
6	Portuguesa	14	6	3	5	16	16	0	15	
7	América	14	4	5	5	14	15	−1	13	
8	São Cristóvão	14	4	5	5	12	14	−2	13	
9	Volta Redonda	14	3	5	6	11	17	−6	11	
10	Bonsucesso	14	3	4	7	12	19	−7	10	
11	Olaria	14	4	2	8	12	14	−2	10	
12	Madureira	14	3	3	8	8	29	−21	9	
13	Americano	14	1	5	8	5	21	−16	7	
14	Campo Grande	14	3	1	10	6	25	−19	7	
15	Goytacaz	14	1	4	9	5	27	−22	6	

Updated to match(es) played on September 25, 1977. Source: RSSSF.com
Rules for classification: 1) points; 2) goal difference; 3) wins; 4) number of goals scored.

==== Playoffs ====
Team 1	Score	Team 2
Flamengo	0–0 (4-5 pen.)	Vasco da Gama

=== Aggregate table ===
Pos	Team	Pld	W	D	L	GF	GA	GD	Pts	Qualification or relegation
1	Vasco da Gama	28	25	2	1	69	5	+64	52	Champions
2	Flamengo	28	23	3	2	75	12	+63	49	
3	Fluminense	28	21	2	5	57	13	+44	44	
4	Botafogo	28	18	4	6	62	16	+46	40	
5	América	28	12	9	7	32	27	+5	33	
6	Bangu	28	9	10	9	28	33	−5	28	
7	São Cristóvão	28	8	8	12	26	41	−15	24	
8	Bonsucesso	28	8	7	13	27	37	−10	23	
9	Portuguesa	28	9	4	15	23	35	−12	22	
10	Olaria	28	7	7	14	26	51	−25	21	
11	Volta Redonda	28	5	9	14	19	39	−20	19	
12	Americano	28	4	10	14	20	38	−18	18	
13	Madureira	28	5	7	16	14	56	−42	17	
14	Goytacaz	28	3	10	15	13	44	−31	16	
15	Campo Grande	28	5	4	19	14	58	−44	14	

Updated to match(es) played on September 25, 1977. Source: RSSSF.com
Rules for classification: 1) points; 2) wins; 3) goal difference; 4) number of goals scored.

== Top Scorer ==
Rank	Player	Club	Goals
1	Zico	Flamengo	27
2	Roberto Dinamite	Vasco da Gama	25
3	Dé	Botafogo	19
4	Mario	América	16
5	Ramon	Vasco da Gama	13
6	Roberto Rivellino	Fluminense	11
6	Osni	Flamengo	11
6	Tuca	Bonsucesso	11
9	Narciso Doval	Fluminense	10
