= Aírton Ravagniani =

Brazilian footballer (1959–2019)

Aírton
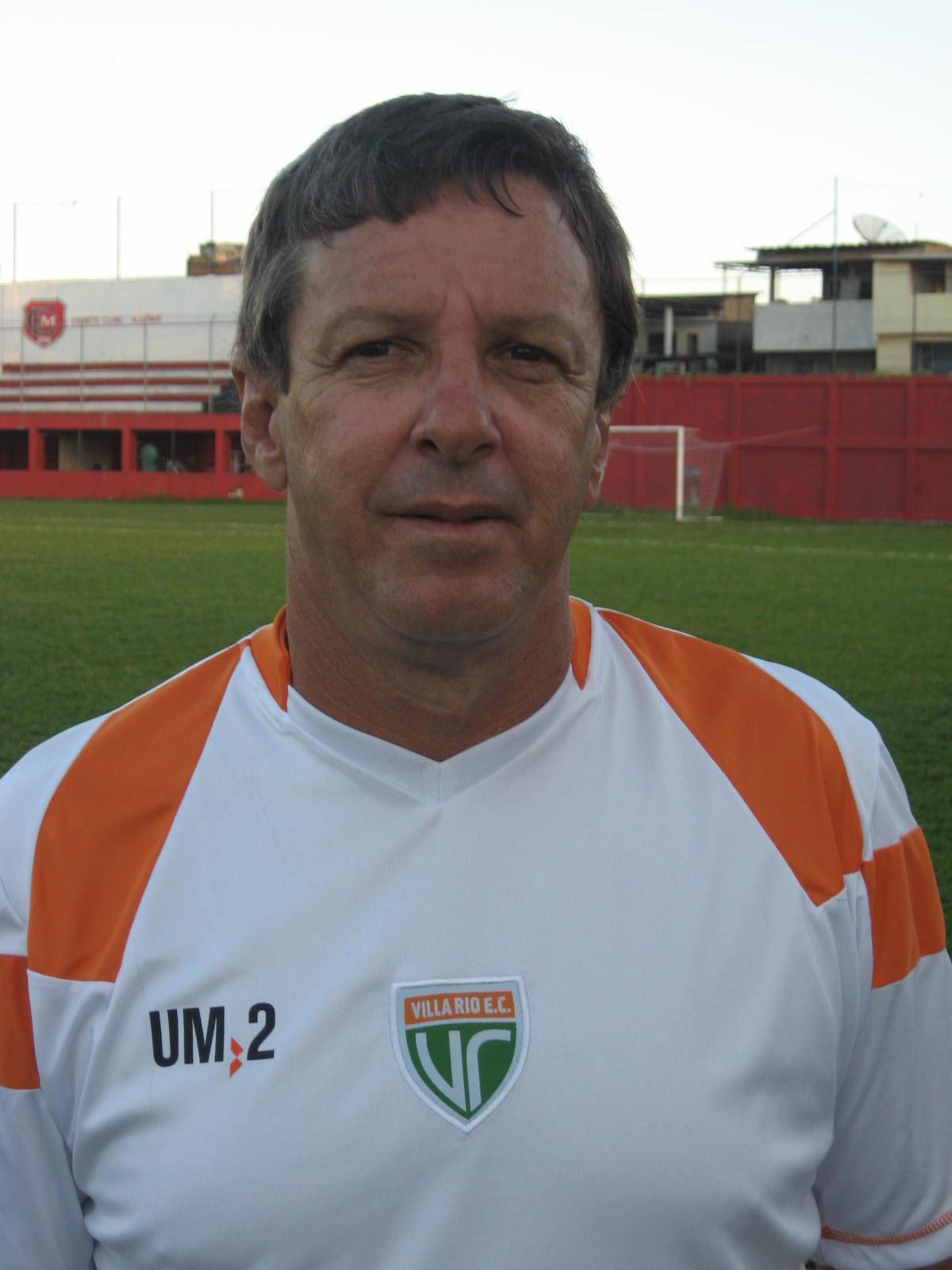
- Ravagniani in 2010

Personal information
- Full name: Aírton Ravagniani
- Date of birth: 19 May 1959
- Place of birth: São Paulo, Brazil
- Date of death: 23 March 2019 (aged 59)
- Place of death: São Carlos, Brazil
- Position: Left-back

Youth career
- 1972–1978: São Paulo

Senior career*
Years	Team	Apps	(Gls)
1979–1981	São Paulo	97	(0)
1982–1984	America-RJ		
1984–1985	Vasco da Gama		
1986–1987	Flamengo	40	(2)
1988–1989	Grêmio	64	(1)
1989	Sport Recife		
1990	Paulista		
1990	São José-SP		
1991	Avaí		
1992	São Caetano		

Managerial career
- 2011: Taboão da Serra
- * Club domestic league appearances and goals

Aírton Ravagniani (19 May 1959 – 23 March 2019), was a Brazilian professional footballer who played as a left-back.

== Career ==
Aírton began his career in São Paulo FC's youth sectors and was part of the champion squad of the 1980 Campeonato Paulista. He also won titles at América, Vasco, Flamengo, and Grêmio.

Aírton had only one experience as a manager, at CA Taboão da Serra in 2011. He lived his last years in Rio Claro, where he was a teacher at a small football school.

== Death ==
Aírton died in São Carlos at the age of 59 from liver cancer.

== Honours ==
São Paulo

- Campeonato Paulista: 1980, 1981

America

- Torneio dos Campeões: 1982

Vasco da Gama

- Taça Rio: 1984

Flamengo

- Copa União Green Module: 1987

Grêmio

- Campeonato Gaúcho: 1988, 1989
