= Arturzinho =

Brazilian footballer (born 1956)

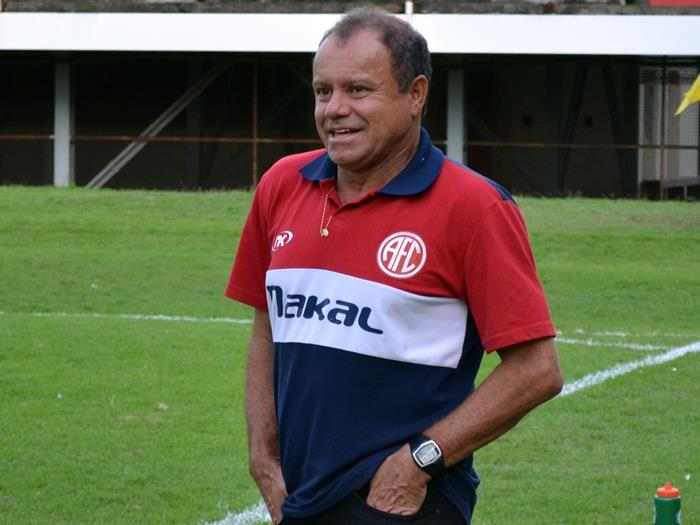
- Arturzinho acting as coach America in 2015

Personal information
- Full name: Artur dos Santos Lima
- Date of birth: 1 September 1952 (age 74)
- Place of birth: Rio de Janeiro, Brazil
- Position: Midfielder

Senior career*
| Years | Team | Apps | (Gls) |
| 1974 | São Cristóvão | | |
| 1976–1978 | Fluminense | | |
| 1979–1981 | Operário (MS) | | |
| 1981 | Internacional | | |
| 1982–1983 | Bangu | | |
| 1984 | Vasco da Gama | | |
| 1984–1985 | Corinthians | | |
| 1985–1986 | Bangu | | |
| 1986–1987 | Botafogo | | |
| 1987–1990 | Bangu | | |
| 1990 | Fortaleza | | |
| 1990 | Paysandu | | |
| 1991 | Bangu | | |
| 1992–1993 | Vitória | | |
| 1993–1994 | Bahia | | |
| 1994 | Fortaleza | | |
| 1995 | Villa Nova | | |
| 1995 | Madureira | | |
| 1996 | Olaria | | |
| 1997 | Fluminense | | |

International career
| 1984 | Brazil | 1 | (1) |

Managerial career
- 1997: Vitória
- 1997: Fluminense
- 1998: América de Natal
- 1999: Sampaio Corrêa
- 1999–2000: Santa Cruz
- 2000–2001: Vitória
- 2001–2002: Vila Nova
- 2002–2003: Vitória
- 2003–2004: Sampaio Corrêa
- 2004: Cabofriense
- 2004–2005: Olaria
- 2005–2006: Vitória
- 2006–2008: Bahia
- 2009: Al Kharaitiyat
- 2009: ABC
- 2009: Vila Nova
- 2010–2011: Anapolina
- 2011: Joinville
- 2013: CRAC
- 2013: Joinville
- 2013: Paysandu
- 2015: America
- 2017: Bangu
- * Club domestic league appearances and goals

Artur dos Santos Lima (born 13 May 1956), also known as Arturzinho, is a Brazilian professional football coach and former player. He was most recently in charge of Centro Esportivo Social Arturzinho in 2019.

Before his career as a coach, Arturzinho played as a midfielder, most notably for Vitória and Bahia.

== Career ==
Arturzinho began his professional career in the São Cristóvão in 1974. In 1990, he played for in Fortaleza and Paysandu, and spent his last years as a player at Bahia and Vitória.

In 1984, he played for the Brazil national team.

He started his career as a coach at Vitória in 1997.

== Honours ==
=== Player ===
Fluminense

- Campeonato Carioca: 1976

Operário

- Campeonato Sul-Mato-Grossense: 1978, 1979, 1980 e 1981

Vitória

- Campeonato Baiano: 1992

Bahia

- Campeonato Baiano: 1994

=== Coach ===
Vitória

- Campeonato Baiano: 1997, 2000
- Copa do Nordeste: 1997

Vila Nova

- Campeonato Goiano: 2001

América-RN

- Copa do Nordeste: 1998

Joinville

- Campeonato Brasileiro Série C: 2011
- Copa Santa Catarina: 2011
