= 1983 in Brazilian football =

Football in Brazil
- Season: 1983

The following article presents a summary of the 1983 football (soccer) season in Brazil, which was the 82nd season of competitive football in the country.

== Campeonato Brasileiro Série A ==
Quarterfinals

Team 1	Agg.	Team 2	1st leg	2nd leg
Atlético Paranaense	2–2	São Paulo	2–1	0–1
Vasco da Gama	2–3	Flamengo	1–2	1–1
Goiás	2–2	Santos	0–0	2–2
Sport	1–4	Atlético Mineiro	0–0	1–4

Semifinals

Team 1	Agg.	Team 2	1st leg	2nd leg
Santos	2–1	Atlético Mineiro	2–1	0–0
Flamengo	3–2	Atlético Paranaense	3–0	0–2

Final

May 18, 1983

Santos	2–1	Flamengo

Morumbi

May 29, 1983

Flamengo	3–0	Santos

Maracanã

Flamengo declared as the Campeonato Brasileiro champions by aggregate score of 4–2.

=== Relegation ===
The worst placed team in each one of the eight groups in the first stage plus the four clubs eliminated in the qualification/relegation playoff, which are Brasília, CSA, Ferroviário-CE, Fortaleza, Galícia, Joinville, Juventus, Mixto, Moto Club, Paysandu, Rio Branco-ES and Treze, were relegated to the same year's second level.

== Campeonato Brasileiro Série B ==
Quarterfinals

Team 1	Agg.	Team 2	1st leg	2nd leg
Galícia	3–5	Juventus	2–3	1–2
Londrina	0–2	Joinville	0–1	0–1
Mixto	2–7	CSA	1–3	1–4
Brasília	2–1	Central	1–0	1–1

Semifinals

Team 1	Agg.	Team 2	1st leg	2nd leg
Brasília	1–1	CSA	0–0	1–1
Joinville	1–2	Juventus	0–0	1–2

Final

April 24, 1983

CSA	3–1	Juventus

May 1, 1983

Juventus	3–0	CSA

May 4, 1983

Juventus	1–0	CSA

Juventus declared as the Campeonato Brasileiro Série B champions by aggregate score of 5–3.

=== Promotion ===
The first placed team in each one of the four groups in the second stage, which were Guarani, Uberaba, Americano and Botafogo-SP, were promoted to the same season's first level's second stage. Juventus and CSA would be promoted to the following year's first level, but eventually, their promotions were cancelled.

== State championship champions ==
State	Champion	State	Champion
Acre	Rio Branco-AC	Paraíba	Treze
Alagoas	CRB	Paraná	Atlético Paranaense
Amapá	Independente	Pernambuco	Santa Cruz
Amazonas	Nacional	Piauí	Auto Esporte
Bahia	Bahia	Rio de Janeiro	Fluminense
Ceará	Fortaleza	Rio Grande do Norte	ABC
Distrito Federal	Brasília	Rio Grande do Sul	Internacional
Espírito Santo	Rio Branco-ES	Rondônia	Flamengo-RO
Goiás	Goiás	Roraima	Atlético Roraima
Maranhão	Moto Club	Santa Catarina	Joinville
Mato Grosso	Operário (VG)	São Paulo	Corinthians
Mato Grosso do Sul	Operário	Sergipe	Confiança
Minas Gerais	Atlético Mineiro	Tocantins	-
Pará	Tuna Luso		

== Youth competition champions ==
Competition	Champion
Copa São Paulo de Juniores	Atlético Mineiro

== Other competition champions ==
Competition	Champion
Taça Minas Gerais	Cruzeiro
Torneio de Integração da Amazônia	Baré

== Brazilian clubs in international competitions ==
Team	Copa Libertadores 1983	Intercontinental Cup 1983
Flamengo	Group stage	N/A
Grêmio	Champions	Champions

== Brazil national team ==
The following table lists all the games played by the Brazil national football team in official competitions and friendly matches during 1983.

Date	Opposition	Result	Score	Brazil scorers	Competition
April 28, 1983	Chile	W	3–2	Careca, Éder, Renato	International Friendly
June 8, 1983	Portugal	W	4–0	Careca (2), Sócrates, Pedrinho	International Friendly
June 12, 1983	Wales	D	1–1	Paulo Isidoro	International Friendly
June 17, 1983	Switzerland	W	2–1	Sócrates, Careca	International Friendly
June 22, 1983	Sweden	D	3–3	Márcio Rossini, Careca, Jorginho	International Friendly
July 28, 1983	Chile	D	0–0	—	International Friendly
August 17, 1983	Ecuador	W	1–0	Roberto Dinamite	Copa América
August 24, 1983	Argentina	L	0–1	—	Copa América
September 1, 1983	Ecuador	W	5–0	Renato Gaúcho, Roberto Dinamite (2), Éder, Tita	Copa América
August 14, 1983	Argentina	D	0–0	—	Copa América
October 13, 1983	Paraguay	D	1–1	Éder	Copa América
October 20, 1983	Paraguay	D	0–0	—	Copa América
October 27, 1983	Uruguay	L	0–2	—	Copa América
November 4, 1983	Uruguay	D	1–1	Jorginho	Copa América

== Women's football ==
=== Domestic competition champions ===
Competition	Champion
Campeonato Carioca	Radar
Taça Brasil	Radar
