= 1984 in Brazilian football =

Football in Brazil
- Season: 1984

The following article presents a summary of the 1984 football (soccer) season in Brazil, which was the 83rd season of competitive football in the country.

== Campeonato Brasileiro Série A ==
Quarterfinals

| Team 1 | Agg. | Team 2 | 1st leg | 2nd leg |
|---|---|---|---|---|
| Coritiba | 2-7 | Fluminense | 2-2 | 0-5 |
| Flamengo | 3-4 | Corinthians | 2-0 | 1-4 |
| Portuguesa | 5-9 | Vasco da Gama | 2-5 | 3-4 |
| Náutico | 5-9 | Grêmio | 2-3 | 1-3 |

Semifinals

| Team 1 | Agg. | Team 2 | 1st leg | 2nd leg |
|---|---|---|---|---|
| Grêmio | 1-3 | Vasco da Gama | 1-0 | 0-3 |
| Corinthians | 0-2 | Fluminense | 0-2 | 0-0 |

Final

May 24, 1984

| Vasco da Gama | 0–1 | Fluminense |

Maracanã

May 28, 1984

| Fluminense | 0–0 | Vasco da Gama |

Maracanã

Fluminense declared as the Campeonato Brasileiro champions by aggregate score of 1-0.

== Campeonato Brasileiro Série B ==
Quarterfinals

| Team 1 | Agg. | Team 2 | 1st leg | 2nd leg |
|---|---|---|---|---|
| Itabuna | 2-4 | Botafogo-PB | 2-2 | 0-2 |
| Internacional-SM | 3-1 | Central | 2-0 | 1-1 |
| Comercial | 3-4 | Remo | 1-1 | 2-3 |
| Itumbiara | 2-3 | Uberlândia | 1-2 | 1-1 |

Semifinals

| Team 1 | Agg. | Team 2 | 1st leg | 2nd leg |
|---|---|---|---|---|
| Internacional-SM | 0-3 | Remo | 0-0 | 0-3 |
| Botafogo-PB | 0-6 | Uberlândia | 0-4 | 0-2 |

Final

March 28, 1984

| Uberlândia | 1–0 | Remo |

April 1, 1984

| Remo | 0–0 | Uberlândia |

Uberlândia declared as the Campeonato Brasileiro Série B champions by aggregate score of 1-0.

=== Promotion ===
The champion and the runner-up, which are Uberlândia and Remo, were promoted to the following year's first level.

== State championship champions ==
| State | Champion | State | Champion |
|---|---|---|---|
| Acre | Juventus-AC | Paraíba | Botafogo-PB |
| Alagoas | CSA | Paraná | Pinheiros |
| Amapá | Trem | Pernambuco | Náutico |
| Amazonas | Nacional | Piauí | Flamengo-PI |
| Bahia | Bahia | Rio de Janeiro | Fluminense |
| Ceará | Ceará | Rio Grande do Norte | ABC |
| Distrito Federal | Brasília | Rio Grande do Sul | Internacional |
| Espírito Santo | Desportiva | Rondônia | Ypiranga-RO |
| Goiás | Vila Nova | Roraima | Baré |
| Maranhão | Sampaio Corrêa | Santa Catarina | Joinville |
| Mato Grosso | Mixto | São Paulo | Santos |
| Mato Grosso do Sul | Corumbaense | Sergipe | Sergipe |
| Minas Gerais | Cruzeiro | Tocantins | - |
| Pará | Paysandu | | |

== Youth competition champions ==
| Competition | Champion |
|---|---|
| Copa São Paulo de Juniores | Santos |

== Other competition champions ==
| Competition | Champion |
|---|---|
| Taça Minas Gerais | Cruzeiro |
| Torneio Centro-Oeste | Guará |
| Torneio de Integração da Amazônia | Rio Branco |

== Brazilian clubs in international competitions ==
| Team | Copa Libertadores 1984 |
|---|---|
| Flamengo | Semifinals |
| Grêmio | Runner-up |
| Santos | Group stage |

== Brazil national team ==
The following table lists all the games played by the Brazil national football team in official competitions and friendly matches during 1984.

| Date | Opposition | Result | Score | Brazil scorers | Competition |
|---|---|---|---|---|---|
| June 10, 1984 | England | L | 0-2 | - | International Friendly |
| June 17, 1984 | Argentina | D | 0-0 | - | International Friendly |
| June 21, 1984 | Uruguay | W | 1-0 | Arturzinho | International Friendly |

== Women's football ==
=== Domestic competition champions ===
| Competition | Champion |
|---|---|
| Campeonato Carioca | Radar |
| Taça Brasil | Radar |
