= 1984 Campeonato Carioca =

Campeonato Carioca
- Season: 1984
- Champions: Fluminense
- Relegated: Campo Grande; Friburguense
- Taça de Ouro: Fluminense; Flamengo; Vasco da Gama; Bangu; América; Botafogo
- Taça de Prata: Americano; Goytacaz
- Matches played: 135
- Goals scored: 275 (2.04 per match)
- Top goalscorer: Baltazar (Botafogo); Cláudio Adão (Bangu)- 12 goals
- Biggest home win: Goytacaz 5-0 Campo Grande (September 23, 1984)
- Biggest away win: Friburguense 0-4 Fluminense (November 4, 1984)
- Highest scoring: Bangu 4-2 Olaria (July 15, 1984); Fluminense 5-1 Friburguense (August 4, 1984); Friburguense 2-4 Flamengo (September 2, 1984); Botafogo 4-2 Fluminense (November 18, 1984)

The 1984 edition of the Campeonato Carioca kicked off on July 1, 1984, and ended on December 16, 1984. It is the official tournament organized by FFERJ (Federação de Futebol do Estado do Rio de Janeiro, or Rio de Janeiro State Football Federation. Only clubs based in the Rio de Janeiro State are allowed to play. Twelve teams contested this edition. Fluminense won the title for the 26th time. Campo Grande and Friburguense were relegated.

== System ==
The tournament would be divided in three stages:

- Taça Guanabara: The twelve teams all played in a single round-robin format against each other. The champions qualified to the Final phase.
- Taça Rio: The twelve teams all played in a single round-robin format against each other. The champions qualified to the Final phase.
- Final phase: The champions of the two stages, plus the team with the best overall record would play that phase. each team played in a single round-robin format against each other and the team with the most points won the title.

== Championship ==
=== Taça Guanabara ===
Pos	Team	Pld	W	D	L	GF	GA	GD	Pts	Qualification or relegation
1	Flamengo	11	9	1	1	22	5	+17	19	Qualified to Final phase
2	Fluminense	11	7	3	1	18	6	+12	17	
3	Bangu	11	6	3	2	17	10	+7	15	
4	América	11	5	3	3	11	6	+5	13	
5	Botafogo	11	5	3	3	15	12	+3	13	
6	Vasco da Gama	11	5	2	4	13	10	+3	12	
7	Americano	11	4	2	5	4	8	−4	10	
8	Goytacaz	11	2	5	4	14	14	0	9	
9	Campo Grande	11	2	3	6	4	13	−9	7	
10	Volta Redonda	11	1	5	5	8	16	−8	7	
11	Friburguense	11	1	4	6	7	21	−14	6	
12	Olaria	11	1	2	8	5	17	−12	4	

Updated to match(es) played on September 23, 1984. Source: RSSSF.com
Rules for classification: 1) points; 2) wins; 3) goal difference; 4) number of goals scored.

=== Taça Rio ===
Pos	Team	Pld	W	D	L	GF	GA	GD	Pts	Qualification or relegation
1	Vasco da Gama	11	7	3	1	18	7	+11	17	Qualified to Final phase
2	Fluminense	11	7	2	2	19	10	+9	16	
3	Botafogo	11	6	3	2	19	11	+8	15	
4	Bangu	11	5	5	1	15	10	+5	15	
5	Flamengo	11	5	4	2	15	10	+5	14	
6	Olaria	11	2	7	2	7	7	0	11	
7	Goytacaz	11	2	5	4	6	10	−4	9	
8	Volta Redonda	11	2	5	4	7	14	−7	9	
9	América	11	2	4	5	9	12	−3	8	
10	Americano	11	0	8	3	5	9	−4	8	
11	Friburguense	11	1	3	7	8	21	−13	5	
12	Campo Grande	11	0	5	6	5	12	−7	5	

Updated to match(es) played on December 2, 1984. Source: RSSSF.com
Rules for classification: 1) points; 2) wins; 3) goal difference; 4) number of goals scored.

=== Aggregate table ===
Pos	Team	Pld	W	D	L	GF	GA	GD	Pts	Qualification or relegation
1	Flamengo	22	14	5	3	37	15	+22	33	
2	Fluminense	22	14	5	3	37	16	+21	33	Qualified to Final phase
3	Bangu	22	11	8	3	32	20	+12	30	
4	Vasco da Gama	22	12	5	5	31	17	+14	29	
5	Botafogo	22	11	6	5	34	23	+11	28	
6	América	22	7	7	8	20	18	+2	21	
7	Goytacaz	22	4	10	8	20	24	−4	18	
8	Americano	22	4	10	8	9	17	−8	18	
9	Volta Redonda	22	3	10	9	15	30	−15	16	
10	Olaria	22	3	9	10	12	24	−12	15	
11	Campo Grande	22	2	8	12	9	25	−16	12	Relegated
12	Friburguense	22	2	7	13	15	42	−27	11	Relegated

Updated to match(es) played on December 2, 1984. Source: RSSSF.com
Rules for classification: 1) points; 2) wins; 3) goal difference; 4) number of goals scored.

=== Finals ===
Pos	Team	Pld	W	D	L	GF	GA	GD	Pts	Qualification or relegation
1	Fluminense	2	2	0	0	3	0	+3	4	Champions
2	Flamengo	2	1	0	1	1	1	0	2	
3	Vasco da Gama	2	0	0	2	0	3	−3	0	

Updated to match(es) played on December 16, 1984. Source: RSSSF.com
Rules for classification: 1) points; 2) wins; 3) goal difference; 4) number of goals scored.
