= 1982 Campeonato Paulista =

Campeonato Paulista – Série A1
- Season: 1982
- Champions: Corinthians
- Relegated: Francana
- Taça de Ouro: Corinthians; São Paulo; Palmeiras; Ponte Preta; Juventus; Ferroviária
- Taça de Prata: Guarani; São Bento; Botafogo; Portuguesa
- Matches: 382
- Goals: 757 (1.98 per match)
- Top goalscorer: Casagrande (Corinthians) – 28 goals
- Biggest home win: Santos 6-1 Palmeiras (November 23, 1982)
- Biggest away win: Guarani 1-6 São Paulo (October 31, 1982)
- Highest scoring: Ferroviária 3-4 XV de Jaú (September 26, 1982); XV de Jaú 3-4 Palmeiras (October 24, 1982)

The 1982 Campeonato Paulista da Primeira Divisão de Futebol Profissional was the 81st season of São Paulo's top professional football league. Corinthians won the championship for the 18th time. Francana was relegated.

== Championship ==
The twenty teams of the championship would all play twice against each other, with the team with the fewest points being relegated, and the second team with the fewest points going to a relegation playoff against the Second level's runner-up. The best teams of each half of the championship would qualify to the Finals, with the title being awarded automatically if the same team won both rounds. In addition to that, the regulation also had provisions for certain scenarios regarding the champions and runners-up of each round.

Pos	Team	Pld	W	D	L	GF	GA	GD	Pts	Qualification or relegation
1	Corinthians	38	24	8	6	71	32	+39	56	Qualified as stage winners
2	São Paulo	38	23	9	6	63	32	+31	55	Qualified as stage winners
3	Palmeiras	38	17	11	10	51	44	+7	45	
4	Ponte Preta	38	14	16	8	44	28	+16	44	
5	Juventus	38	14	14	10	38	35	+3	42	
6	Ferroviária	38	15	11	12	48	54	−6	41	
7	Guarani	38	15	11	12	46	43	+3	41	
8	São Bento	38	13	14	11	30	35	−5	40	
9	Santos	38	10	17	11	37	35	+2	37	
10	Botafogo	38	12	13	13	40	40	0	37	
11	Portuguesa	38	11	14	13	34	36	−2	36	
12	Inter de Limeira	38	10	15	13	36	38	−2	35	
13	Marília	38	11	13	14	25	28	−3	35	
14	São José	38	13	9	16	28	34	−6	35	
15	Taubaté	38	11	12	15	30	46	−16	34	
16	América	38	7	18	13	28	35	−7	32	
17	Comercial	38	8	15	15	21	36	−15	31	
18	Santo André	38	8	14	16	28	42	−14	30	
19	XV de Jaú	38	7	14	17	30	45	−15	28	Relegation Playoffs
20	Francana	38	6	14	18	22	42	−20	26	Relegated

Updated to match(es) played on December 4, 1982. Source: RSSSF.com
Rules for classification: 1) points; 2) goal difference; 3) wins; 4) number of goals scored.

=== Relegation Playoffs ===
According to the original regulation, Francana would be relegated directly to the Second level, being replaced by the champion of the Second level, Taquaritinga, and XV de Jaú would have to play a relegation playoff in neutral ground against Bragantino, runner-up of the Second Level. However, only a few days after the end of the championship, FPF's vice-president declared that the relegation that year would be cancelled, since Taquaritinga and Bragantino's stadiums didn't meet FPF requirements. this sparked a lengthy court battle that ended with the original regulation being upheld, and Bragantino being allowed to play the playoff match against XV de Jaú, with the playoffs beginning only in May 1983. XV de Jaú won the first match by 3-2, and after holding Bragantino to a tie in the return match, managed to remain in the first level.

Team 1	Agg.	Team 2	1st leg	2nd leg
XV de Jaú	4–3	Bragantino	3–2	1–1

=== Finals ===
Team 1	Agg.	Team 2	1st leg	2nd leg
São Paulo	1–4	Corinthians	0–1	1–3
