= 1985 FIFA U-16 World Championship squads =

== Group A ==
=== China ===
Head coach: (China) Gao Fengwen

No.	Pos.	Player	Date of birth (age)	Caps	Club
1	GK	Li Xianzhong	20 August 1968 (aged 16)		(China) Liaoning
2	DF	Feng Zhigang	29 November 1969 (aged 15)		(China) Wuhan
3	DF	Shang Qing	16 November 1968 (aged 16)		(China) Bayi
4	DF	Fan Li	25 September 1968 (aged 16)		(China) Shanghai
5	DF	Bi Sheng	3 August 1968 (aged 16)		(China) Beijing
6	DF	Sun Bowei	29 September 1968 (aged 16)		(China) Sichuan
7	MF	Tu Shengqiao	9 November 1968 (aged 16)		(China) Wuhan
8	MF	Xie Yuxin	10 December 1968 (aged 16)		(China) Guangdong
9	MF	Cao Xiandong	19 August 1968 (aged 16)		(China) Beijing
10	MF	Guo Zhuang	18 August 1968 (aged 16)		(China) Liaoning
11	MF	Qing Baoquan	9 September 1968 (aged 16)		(China) Beijing
12	MF	Li Xangjie	12 December 1968 (aged 16)		(China) Jilin
13	FW	Tang Weihu	20 October 1968 (aged 16)		(China) Yunnan
14	FW	Liu Bin	17 September 1969 (aged 15)		(China) Sichuan
15	FW	Cui Guangri	26 August 1968 (aged 16)		(China) Jilin
16	DF	Yan Yongzhu	9 August 1968 (aged 16)		(China) Jilin
17	FW	Fan Guotao	23 October 1968 (aged 16)		(China) Liaoning
18	GK	Li Zhong	17 October 1968 (aged 16)		(China) Tianjin

=== Bolivia ===
Head coach: (Bolivia) Eduardo Rivero

No.	Pos.	Player	Date of birth (age)	Caps	Club
1	GK	Jorge Arteaga	2 June 1969 (aged 16)		(Bolivia) Tahuichi Academy
2	DF	Ko Ishikawa	10 August 1970 (aged 14)		(Bolivia) Tahuichi Academy
3	DF	Hugo Pinto	12 August 1970 (aged 14)		(Bolivia) Tahuichi Academy
4	MF	David Saracho	31 October 1969 (aged 15)		(Bolivia) Tahuichi Academy
5	MF	César Burgos	6 February 1969 (aged 16)		(Bolivia) Tahuichi Academy
6	MF	Eduardo Trigo	13 April 1969 (aged 16)		(Bolivia) Tahuichi Academy
7	DF	Hernan Atalá	30 July 1969 (aged 16)		(Bolivia) Tahuichi Academy
8	DF	Maximiliano Pérez	24 November 1968 (aged 16)		(Bolivia) Tahuichi Academy
9	MF	Fernando Ribera	15 May 1969 (aged 16)		(Bolivia) Tahuichi Academy
10	MF	Erwin Sánchez	19 October 1969 (aged 15)		(Bolivia) Tahuichi Academy
11	MF	Richard Romero	24 February 1969 (aged 16)		(Bolivia) Tahuichi Academy
12	GK	Ronald Cadario	18 July 1969 (aged 16)		(Bolivia) Tahuichi Academy
13	MF	Mauricio Ramos	23 September 1969 (aged 15)		(Bolivia) Tahuichi Academy
14	FW	Marco Etcheverry	26 September 1970 (aged 14)		(Bolivia) Tahuichi Academy
15	DF	Jorge Aponte	25 September 1968 (aged 16)		(Bolivia) Tahuichi Academy
16	FW	Ramón Cruz	23 March 1969 (aged 16)		(Bolivia) Tahuichi Academy
17	FW	Marcos Urquiza	12 December 1970 (aged 14)		(Bolivia) Tahuichi Academy
18	DF	Walter Aguilera	11 May 1970 (aged 15)		(Bolivia) Tahuichi Academy

=== Guinea ===
Head coach: (Guinea) Chérif Souleymane

No.	Pos.	Player	Date of birth (age)	Caps	Club
1	GK	Fodé Sylla	2 April 1969 (aged 16)		(Guinea) Hafia
2	DF	Ousmane Camara	13 February 1970 (aged 15)		(Guinea) Université Club
3	DF	Abdoul Sow	13 August 1970 (aged 14)		(Guinea) Université Club
4	DF	Morlaye Soumah	27 January 1971 (aged 14)		(Guinea) Université Club
5	DF	Ousmane Fernández	4 February 1969 (aged 16)		(Guinea) Atlantic
6	DF	Mohamed Conte	9 April 1969 (aged 16)		(Guinea) Hafia
7	FW	Mohamed Kake	9 June 1970 (aged 15)		(Guinea) Université Club
8	DF	Sékou Fofana	4 June 1970 (aged 15)		(Guinea) Université Club
9	MF	Mohamed Soumah	24 May 1970 (aged 15)		(Guinea) Hafia
10	MF	Lamine Touré	23 December 1971 (aged 13)		(Guinea) Université Club
11	MF	Mohamed Camara	13 April 1970 (aged 15)		(Guinea) Université Club
12	MF	Mohamed Sylla	22 February 1971 (aged 14)		(Guinea) Hafia
13	MF	Fodé Soumah	29 October 1969 (aged 15)		(Guinea) Université Club
14	MF	Salifou Koita	8 May 1969 (aged 16)		(Guinea) Hafia
15	FW	Abdoul Karim Bangoura	9 February 1970 (aged 15)		(Guinea) Université Club
16	FW	Ibrahima Touré	13 January 1970 (aged 15)		(Guinea) Université Club
17	FW	Abdourahmane Camara	15 February 1971 (aged 14)		(Guinea) Hafia
18	GK	Edgar Sylla	22 March 1970 (aged 15)		(Guinea) Université Club

=== United States ===
Head coach: (United States) Angus McAlpine

No.	Pos.	Player	Date of birth (age)	Caps	Club
1	GK	Tom Foley	10 August 1968 (aged 16)		(United States) Billerica
2	MF	Brian Adcock	17 August 1968 (aged 16)		(United States) Evan Hut
3	FW	Brian Benedict	27 December 1968 (aged 16)		(United States) Lauderh Lions
4	MF	John Cocking	27 September 1968 (aged 16)		(United States) Concorde
5	DF	Neil Covone	31 August 1969 (aged 15)		(United States) Hialeah Lakes
6	DF	Brian Donally	9 June 1969 (aged 16)		(United States) Scott Gallagher SC
7	DF	Tony Epifani	5 January 1969 (aged 16)		(United States) Sporting Foot
8	MF	Hendrig Gutiérrez	28 August 1968 (aged 16)		(United States) Date County
9	DF	John Gwin	31 October 1968 (aged 16)		(United States) Torrance United
10	FW	Chris Hillyer	30 September 1969 (aged 15)		(United States) Juventus SC
11	MF	Kris Kelderman	10 December 1968 (aged 16)		(United States) Neenah Eagles
12	FW	Larry McPhail	27 August 1968 (aged 16)		(United States) Titans
13	DF	Derek Missimo	20 January 1969 (aged 16)		(United States) Comets
14	MF	David Mueller	4 October 1968 (aged 16)		(United States) Rangers SC
15	FW	Curtis Pride	17 December 1968 (aged 16)		(United States) Saddlebrook
16	DF	Joey Valenti	29 August 1968 (aged 16)		(United States) Tampa Bay Rangers
17	MF	Lyle Yorks	30 January 1970 (aged 15)		(United States) Mansfield SC
18	GK	Mike Gaub	14 September 1968 (aged 16)		(United States) W Valley United

== Group B ==
=== Australia ===
Head coach: (Australia) Vic Dalgleish

No.	Pos.	Player	Date of birth (age)	Caps	Club
1	GK	George Bouhoutsos	3 April 1969 (aged 16)		(Australia) Canterbury
2	MF	Damien Butler	5 September 1969 (aged 15)		(Australia) Inala City
3	DF	Gareth Naven	3 March 1969 (aged 16)		(Australia) Bayswater Inter
4	MF	Craig Naven	3 March 1969 (aged 16)		(Australia) Bayswater Inter
5	DF	George Jolevski	26 March 1969 (aged 16)		(Australia) Preston Makedonia
6	DF	Michael Graham	6 February 1969 (aged 16)		(Australia) Wallsend
7	DF	Robert Runje	26 February 1969 (aged 16)		(Australia) Frankston Pines
8	MF	Craig Foster	15 April 1969 (aged 16)		(Australia) Goonellabah
9	MF	David Scott	31 July 1969 (aged 16)		(Australia) Blacktown City
10	MF	Alfie Catalano	26 August 1968 (aged 16)		(Australia) Brisbane City
11	DF	David Barrett	21 February 1969 (aged 16)		(Australia) Sydney Olympic
12	MF	Mark Talajic	2 July 1969 (aged 16)		(Australia) Melbourne Croatia
13	MF	Anthony Grbac	30 March 1969 (aged 16)		(Australia) Brunswick Juventus
14	FW	Scott Racey	10 May 1969 (aged 16)		(Australia) Bayswater Inter
15	FW	Paul Trimboli	25 February 1969 (aged 16)		(Australia) Brighton
16	FW	Stan Thodis	11 April 1969 (aged 16)		(Australia) Heidelberg United
17	FW	Colin Cooper	1 February 1969 (aged 16)		(Australia) Altona City
18	GK	Corrado Nobile	14 October 1968 (aged 16)		(Australia) Fawkner Blues

=== Argentina ===
Head coach: (Argentina) Carlos Pachamé

No.	Pos.	Player	Date of birth (age)	Caps	Club
1	GK	José Miguel Zavaelavd	23 June 1969 (aged 16)		(Argentina) River Plate
2	DF	Favio Alberto Almirón	7 April 1969 (aged 16)		(Argentina) Nueva Chicago
3	MF	Diego Álvarez	1 May 1969 (aged 16)		(Argentina) River Plate
4	DF	Fernando Gabriel Cáceres	7 February 1969 (aged 16)		(Argentina) Argentinos Juniors
5	DF	Juan Cybulski	8 March 1969 (aged 16)		(Argentina) River Plate
6	MF	Alberto Oscar Denis	8 February 1969 (aged 16)		(Argentina) Vélez Sársfield
7	FW	Lorenzo Frutos	2 May 1969 (aged 16)		(Argentina) San Lorenzo
8	MF	Fernando Juan Kuyumuchoglu	27 February 1969 (aged 16)		(Argentina) River Plate
9	MF	Hugo Hernan Maradona	9 May 1969 (aged 16)		(Argentina) Argentinos Juniors
10	DF	Gabriel Alejandro Marino	20 March 1969 (aged 16)		(Argentina) Argentinos Juniors
11	DF	Gustavo Atuel Montero	15 February 1969 (aged 16)		(Argentina) River Plate
12	GK	Christian Norberto Corrales	4 June 1969 (aged 16)		(Argentina) Huracán
13	FW	Alejandro Fabian Presa	10 March 1969 (aged 16)		(Argentina) Estudiantes de La Plata
14	MF	Fernando Redondo	6 June 1969 (aged 16)		(Argentina) Argentinos Juniors
15	MF	Mario Facundo Rocca	10 February 1969 (aged 16)		(Argentina) Independiente
16	FW	Alejandro Ruidíaz	3 September 1969 (aged 15)		(Argentina) Independiente
17	MF	Pedro Ignacio Sallaberry	29 January 1969 (aged 16)		(Argentina) Talleres de Remedios de Escalada
18	DF	Néstor Ariel Valenzuela	19 November 1969 (aged 15)		(Argentina) Vélez Sársfield

=== Congo ===
Head coach: (Republic of the Congo) David Memy

No.	Pos.	Player	Date of birth (age)	Caps	Club
1	GK	Jasmin Ngangoye	5 October 1968 (aged 16)		(Republic of the Congo) Abeilles FC
2	DF	Eric Mantot	6 September 1968 (aged 16)		(Republic of the Congo) CARA
3	DF	Jean Nzikou	12 August 1968 (aged 16)		(Republic of the Congo) Inter Club
4	DF	José Malanda	15 September 1968 (aged 16)		(Republic of the Congo) Vita Club Mokanda
5	DF	Lambert Galibali	3 December 1968 (aged 16)		(Republic of the Congo) EMPCR
6	MF	Ladislas Ossie	1 September 1969 (aged 15)		(Republic of the Congo) Telesport
7	MF	Mesmin Mbemba	27 December 1968 (aged 16)		(Republic of the Congo) Kotoko MFOA
8	MF	Étienne Salles	11 November 1968 (aged 16)		(Republic of the Congo) Vita Club Mokanda
9	FW	Alphonse Gono	2 April 1970 (aged 15)		(Republic of the Congo) Inter Club
10	FW	Guy Makosso-Pouna	27 September 1969 (aged 15)		(Republic of the Congo) AS Cheminots
11	MF	Antoine Ebiki-Kama	3 September 1968 (aged 16)		(Republic of the Congo) US Agip
12	MF	Landry Kanza	7 May 1970 (aged 15)		(Republic of the Congo) CARA
13	DF	Thierry Obs-Apounou	26 September 1968 (aged 16)		(Republic of the Congo) EMPCR
14	DF	Yvon Ossibi	16 October 1969 (aged 15)		(Republic of the Congo) EMPCR
15	FW	Jean-Paul Balla	20 October 1968 (aged 16)		(Republic of the Congo) Vita Club Mokanda
16	GK	Wilfrid Kibangou	22 June 1969 (aged 16)		(Republic of the Congo) Telesport
17	MF	Guy Etoto	12 June 1971 (aged 14)		(Republic of the Congo) US Avenir
18	FW	Hervé Kakou	25 November 1968 (aged 16)		(Republic of the Congo) CARA

=== West Germany ===
Head coach: (West Germany) Horst Köppel

No.	Pos.	Player	Date of birth (age)	Caps	Club
1	GK	Alexander Ogrinc	10 December 1968 (aged 16)		(West Germany) VfB Stuttgart
2	DF	Ralf Lewe	13 May 1969 (aged 16)		(West Germany) Wattenscheid 09
3	DF	Peter Jung	22 September 1968 (aged 16)		(West Germany) SV Kuppenheim
4	DF	Dirk Konerding	27 February 1969 (aged 16)		(West Germany) Arminia Bielefeld
5	MF	Martin Schneider	24 November 1968 (aged 16)		(West Germany) Bayern Munich
6	MF	Peter Gartmann	30 August 1968 (aged 16)		(West Germany) FC Augsburg
7	MF	René Schliechting	7 October 1968 (aged 16)		(West Germany) Eintracht Frankfurt
8	MF	Klaus Mirwald	11 September 1968 (aged 16)		(West Germany) VfB Stuttgart
9	MF	Marcel Witeczek	18 October 1968 (aged 16)		(West Germany) Bayer Uerdingen
10	MF	Detlev Dammeier	18 October 1968 (aged 16)		(West Germany) Hannover 96
11	FW	Ralph Jester	8 September 1968 (aged 16)		(West Germany) Bramfelder SV
12	GK	Thomas Revermann	22 September 1968 (aged 16)		(West Germany) Preußen Münster
13	DF	Helmut Gabriel	3 October 1968 (aged 16)		(West Germany) SC Neheim
14	DF	Sascha Kiefaber	23 August 1968 (aged 16)		(West Germany) 1. FC Kaiserslautern
15	MF	Bernhard Schöfer	16 August 1969 (aged 15)		(West Germany) VfB Stuttgart
16	MF	Stefan Simon	18 June 1969 (aged 16)		(West Germany) Eintracht Frankfurt
17	MF	Ralf Sturm	18 October 1968 (aged 16)		(West Germany) 1. FC Köln
18	FW	Peter Radojewski	18 November 1968 (aged 16)		(West Germany) Fortuna Düsseldorf

== Group C ==
=== Saudi Arabia ===
Head coach: (Saudi Arabia) Mohamed Abdoulraman

No.	Pos.	Player	Date of birth (age)	Caps	Club
1	GK	Waleed Al-Baz	17 September 1969 (aged 15)		(Saudi Arabia) Al-Qadisiyah
2	DF	Fahad Al-Eshaiwy	28 January 1970 (aged 15)		(Saudi Arabia) Al-Ahli
3	DF	Hamad Al-Deghaim	29 July 1969 (aged 16)		(Saudi Arabia) Al-Ettifaq
4	DF	Mansour Dagriri	4 November 1969 (aged 15)		(Saudi Arabia) Al-Qadisiyah
5	DF	Abdulrahman Al-Roomi	28 October 1969 (aged 15)		(Saudi Arabia) Al-Ahli
6	MF	Khaled Al-Dosari	6 August 1970 (aged 14)		(Saudi Arabia) Al-Shabab
7	MF	Abdulaziz Al-Razgan	6 December 1969 (aged 15)		(Saudi Arabia) Al-Ettifaq
8	MF	Marwan Al-Bassas	17 May 1970 (aged 15)		(Saudi Arabia) Al-Fatih
9	MF	Saadoun Al-Suraiti	14 July 1970 (aged 15)		(Saudi Arabia) Al-Ettifaq
10	FW	Adel Al-Dosary	4 October 1970 (aged 14)		(Saudi Arabia) Al-Ettifaq
11	FW	Saleh Al-Najrani	21 December 1970 (aged 14)		(Saudi Arabia) Al-Ahli
12	FW	Ali Daghriri	1 December 1969 (aged 15)		(Saudi Arabia) Al Nassr FC
13	FW	Boushal Al-Boushal	22 January 1970 (aged 15)		(Saudi Arabia) Al Jabalain
14	MF	Nasser Al-Fahad	3 July 1969 (aged 16)		(Saudi Arabia) Al-Riyadh
15	DF	Fahad Al-Humaid	28 August 1970 (aged 14)		(Saudi Arabia) Al-Hilal
16	FW	Khaled Al-Harbi	11 October 1969 (aged 15)		(Saudi Arabia) Al-Ittihad
17	DF	Siraj Mashmoos	1 September 1970 (aged 14)		(Saudi Arabia) Al-Shabab
18	GK	Nawaf Mubarak	12 December 1969 (aged 15)		(Saudi Arabia) Al Nassr FC

=== Costa Rica ===
Head coach: (Costa Rica) Manuel Arias

No.	Pos.	Player	Date of birth (age)	Caps	Club
1	GK	Dilson Solis	23 January 1969 (aged 16)		(Costa Rica) Herediano
2	DF	Erick Rodríguez	8 December 1968 (aged 16)		(Costa Rica) Herediano
3	DF	Marcos Padilla	17 July 1969 (aged 16)		(Costa Rica) Saprissa
4	DF	Sergio Alvarado	2 August 1968 (aged 16)		(Costa Rica) San José
5	DF	Edwin Barquero	23 October 1968 (aged 16)		(Costa Rica) Herediano
6	DF	Gilberto Villalobos	9 October 1969 (aged 15)		(Costa Rica) San José
7	MF	Donald Avila	18 August 1968 (aged 16)		(Costa Rica) Deportivo Company
8	MF	Raymond Monney	27 November 1968 (aged 16)		(Costa Rica) Atenas
9	FW	Javier Wanchope	10 August 1968 (aged 16)		(Costa Rica) San José
10	MF	Jaime Quesada	14 May 1969 (aged 16)		(Costa Rica) Saprissa
11	FW	José Ramírez	10 February 1968 (aged 17)		(Costa Rica) Saprissa
12	MF	Hernán Medford	23 May 1968 (aged 17)		(Costa Rica) Grecia
14	FW	Alvaro Hernández	20 March 1969 (aged 16)		(Costa Rica) Grecia
15	MF	Roger León	18 January 1969 (aged 16)		(Costa Rica) Alajuelense
16	FW	Fernando Rosses	29 December 1968 (aged 16)		(Costa Rica) Belén
17	FW	Sergio Bogantes	2 February 1969 (aged 16)		(Costa Rica) Tres Ríos
20	GK	Carlos Ramírez	13 September 1968 (aged 16)		(Costa Rica) Saprissa
22	GK	Rafael Villalobos	23 October 1968 (aged 16)		(Costa Rica) Pérez Zeledón

=== Nigeria ===
Head coach: (Nigeria) Sebastian Brodrick-Imasuen

No.	Pos.	Player	Date of birth (age)	Caps	Club
1	GK	Lucky Agbonsevbafe	12 August 1969 (aged 15)		No club
2	DF	Tenworimi Duere	7 December 1969 (aged 15)		No club
3	DF	Nduka Ugbade	6 September 1969 (aged 15)		No club
4	DF	Fatai Atere	1 August 1971 (aged 13)		No club
5	DF	Binabei Numa	8 July 1969 (aged 16)		No club
6	MF	Kingsley Aikhionbare	24 September 1969 (aged 15)		No club
7	MF	Salisu Nakade	1 October 1968 (aged 16)		No club
8	MF	Sani Adamu	2 November 1968 (aged 16)		No club
9	FW	Jonathan Akpoborie	20 October 1968 (aged 16)		No club
10	FW	Victor Igbinoba	8 October 1969 (aged 15)		No club
11	FW	Bilia Momoh	25 December 1969 (aged 15)		No club
12	GK	Imama Amapakabo	27 July 1969 (aged 16)		No club
13	DF	Baldwin Bazuaye	9 September 1968 (aged 16)		No club
14	FW	Joseph Babatunde	28 July 1969 (aged 16)		No club
15	DF	Chukwuma Nwoha	17 January 1970 (aged 15)		No club
16	MF	Mohamed Yahaya	16 June 1970 (aged 15)		No club
17	MF	Hilary Adiki	1 August 1970 (aged 14)		No club
18	MF	Dele Abubakar	2 October 1969 (aged 15)		No club

- Nigerian players were selected from school teams.

=== Italy ===
Head coach: (Italy) Giuseppe Lupi

No.	Pos.	Player	Date of birth (age)	Caps	Club
1	GK	Fabio Popaiz	7 March 1969 (aged 16)		(Italy) Inter Milan
2	MF	Michele Gelsi	7 September 1968 (aged 16)		(Italy) Fiorentina
3	DF	Roberto Beretta	11 August 1968 (aged 16)		(Italy) Milan
4	DF	Luigi Garzja	7 July 1969 (aged 16)		(Italy) Lecce
5	DF	Alessandro Dozio	1 August 1968 (aged 16)		(Italy) C.S.Beretta
6	MF	Andrea Caverzan	14 September 1968 (aged 16)		(Italy) Montebelluna
7	FW	Giorgio Bresciani	23 April 1969 (aged 16)		(Italy) Torino
8	MF	Piero Tersigni	6 August 1968 (aged 16)		(Italy) Fiorentina
9	MF	Valerio Mazzucato	27 January 1969 (aged 16)		(Italy) Como
10	MF	Roberto D'Ermilio	8 October 1968 (aged 16)		(Italy) Bari
11	FW	Maurizio Ganz	13 October 1968 (aged 16)		(Italy) Sampdoria
12	GK	Alessio Tonet	13 December 1968 (aged 16)		(Italy) Pro Vercelli
13	DF	Stefano Alfonso	28 January 1970 (aged 15)		(Italy) Milan
14	DF	Vincenzo Maiuri	26 May 1969 (aged 16)		(Italy) Como
15	DF	Sergio Porrini	8 November 1968 (aged 16)		(Italy) Milan
16	MF	Mauro Antonioli	27 September 1968 (aged 16)		(Italy) Como
17	FW	Omar Gaslini	28 September 1968 (aged 16)		(Italy) Como
18	MF	Simone Baldo	2 February 1969 (aged 16)		(Italy) Milan

== Group D ==
=== Qatar ===
Head coach: (Brazil) Carlos Roberto Cabral

No.	Pos.	Player	Date of birth (age)	Caps	Club
1	GK	Ahmed Al-Kuwari	8 April 1969 (aged 16)		(Qatar) Al-Nassr
2	DF	Saad Esmael	23 July 1969 (aged 16)		Qatar SC
3	DF	Ali Al-Kubaisi	3 April 1969 (aged 16)		(Qatar) Al-Shamal
4	DF	Ali Al-Sulaiti	18 April 1969 (aged 16)		(Qatar) Al-Arabi
5	DF	Osama Al-Dafea	8 September 1969 (aged 15)		(Qatar) Al-Rayyan
6	MF	Farid Al-Mahmoodi	7 May 1969 (aged 16)		(Qatar) Al-Sadd
7	MF	Mohammed Al-Muhaiza	17 October 1969 (aged 15)		(Qatar) Al-Shamal
8	MF	Yousef Khalaf	7 April 1969 (aged 16)		(Qatar) Al-Tadamon
9	FW	Salah Aman	16 April 1969 (aged 16)		(Qatar) Al-Rayyan
10	MF	Saud Al-Thani	19 June 1969 (aged 16)		(Qatar) Al-Rayyan
11	FW	Adel Al-Abdulla	18 April 1969 (aged 16)		(Qatar) Al-Rayyan
12	GK	Jamal Hilal	18 November 1969 (aged 15)		(Qatar) Al-Arabi
13	DF	Abdulla Al-Adsani	5 May 1969 (aged 16)		(Qatar) Al-Arabi
14	FW	Mohd Bajaidah	4 December 1969 (aged 15)		(Qatar) Al-Sadd
15	DF	Marzouq Abdulla	11 April 1969 (aged 16)		(Qatar) Al-Sadd
16	FW	Saleh Al-Mohannadi	24 September 1969 (aged 15)		(Qatar) Al-Sadd
17	MF	Khalifa Hilal	24 August 1969 (aged 15)		(Qatar) Al-Sadd
18	MF	Rahman Al-Hashmi	17 September 1969 (aged 15)		(Qatar) Education

=== Brazil ===
Head coach: (Brazil) Homero Cavalheiro

No.	Pos.	Player	Date of birth (age)	Caps	Club
1	GK	Palmieri	25 August 1968 (aged 16)		(Brazil) Bangu
2	DF	Resende	9 September 1968 (aged 16)		(Brazil) Vitória
3	DF	Mauricio	25 July 1969 (aged 16)		(Brazil) Vitória
4	DF	André Cruz	20 September 1968 (aged 16)		(Brazil) Ponte Preta
5	MF	Anderson	26 October 1968 (aged 16)		(Brazil) América
6	MF	Iván Rocha	14 January 1969 (aged 16)		(Brazil) São Paulo
7	FW	Moreira	23 January 1969 (aged 16)		(Brazil) Flamengo
8	DF	Pereira	26 November 1969 (aged 15)		(Brazil) Portuguesa
9	MF	Bismarck	17 September 1969 (aged 15)		(Brazil) Vasco da Gama
10	FW	William	17 October 1968 (aged 16)		(Brazil) Vasco da Gama
11	FW	Rodrigues	25 December 1968 (aged 16)		(Brazil) Internacional
12	GK	Assumpça	12 May 1969 (aged 16)		(Brazil) Flamengo
13	DF	Félix	20 February 1970 (aged 15)		(Brazil) Palmeiras
14	DF	Marques	17 September 1968 (aged 16)		(Brazil) Cruzeiro
15	DF	Neto	11 September 1968 (aged 16)		(Brazil) Coritiba
16	MF	Carlos	1 August 1969 (aged 15)		(Brazil) Matsubara
17	FW	Cláudio	30 December 1969 (aged 15)		(Brazil) Botafogo
18	FW	Gilson	29 October 1968 (aged 16)		(Brazil) Grêmio

=== Mexico ===
Head coach: (Mexico) Monito Rodríguez

No.	Pos.	Player	Date of birth (age)	Caps	Club
1	GK	Raul Zepeda	25 March 1969 (aged 16)		(Mexico) América
2	DF	José Franco	14 August 1968 (aged 16)		(Mexico) Necaxa
3	DF	José de la Fuente	16 January 1966 (aged 19)		(Mexico) Monterrey
4	DF	Juan de Dios Ramírez Perales	8 March 1969 (aged 16)		(Mexico) UNAM
5	DF	Héctor Rubio	10 November 1968 (aged 16)		(Mexico) Cruz Azul
6	MF	Pedro García	2 April 1969 (aged 16)		(Mexico) Atlas
7	MF	Ramon Raya	8 September 1968 (aged 16)		(Mexico) América
8	MF	Enrique González	21 February 1969 (aged 16)		(Mexico) Ag de Echeg
9	MF	José Castillo	17 August 1968 (aged 16)		(Mexico) UNAM
10	FW	Rafael Ramirez-Herrera	12 February 1969 (aged 16)		(Mexico) Deportivo Paris
11	FW	Elias Ledesma	9 January 1969 (aged 16)		(Mexico) Azucareros
12	MF	Víctor Montoya	14 November 1968 (aged 16)		(Mexico) América
13	DF	Maurício Estrada	12 June 1969 (aged 16)		(Mexico) América
14	MF	Gabriel Ruiz	18 October 1969 (aged 15)		(Mexico) América
15	DF	Gilberto Camargo	10 May 1969 (aged 16)		(Mexico) América
16	FW	Luis García	1 June 1969 (aged 16)		(Mexico) UNAM
17	GK	Manuel Villegas	26 August 1968 (aged 16)		(Mexico) Atlas
18	FW	Francisco Cortés	17 August 1969 (aged 15)		(Mexico) Tecos UAG

=== Hungary ===
Head coach: (Hungary) Bertalan Bicskei

No.	Pos.	Player	Date of birth (age)	Caps	Club
1	GK	István Tarlósi	29 August 1968 (aged 16)		(Hungary) Salgótarján
2	MF	Csaba Horváth	7 March 1969 (aged 16)		(Hungary) MTK-VM
3	DF	András Jávorka	17 August 1968 (aged 16)		(Hungary) Budapest Honved
4	DF	János Palaczky	30 August 1968 (aged 16)		(Hungary) Pécsi MSC
5	MF	Tamás Udvardi	28 September 1968 (aged 16)		(Hungary) Vasas Sport Club
6	DF	András Kisistók	25 December 1968 (aged 16)		(Austria) ASK Amstetten
7	MF	László Marik	9 March 1969 (aged 16)		(Hungary) Dorogi FC
8	MF	Zsolt Limperger	13 September 1968 (aged 16)		(Hungary) Ferencváros
9	FW	Attila Kecskés	13 February 1969 (aged 16)		(Hungary) FC Sopron
10	FW	Tamás Petres	3 September 1968 (aged 16)		(Hungary) Videoton SC
11	FW	Zoltán Kanál	11 November 1968 (aged 16)		(Hungary) Bekescsabai Elore
12	FW	Zoltán Molnár	24 September 1968 (aged 16)		(Hungary) Mad FC
13	DF	Attila Harcsár	11 November 1968 (aged 16)		(Hungary) Kaposvari Rakoczi FC
14	DF	Zsolt Páling	16 February 1969 (aged 16)		(Hungary) Ferencváros
15	MF	Zsolt Huszák	11 November 1968 (aged 16)		(Hungary) MTK Budapest
16	DF	József Ördög	30 June 1969 (aged 16)		(Hungary) ETO FC Győr
17	MF	István Szőczey	29 September 1968 (aged 16)		(Hungary) Budapest Vasutas SC
18	GK	Árpád Kovácsevics	4 October 1968 (aged 16)		(Hungary) Bajai SK
