= 1990 Supercopa do Brasil =

The 1990 Supercopa do Brasil was the 1st Supercopa do Brasil, a football competition played between the champions of the 1989 Campeonato Brasileiro Série A and 1989 Copa do Brasil.

== Qualified teams ==
Team	Qualification
(Rio de Janeiro (state)) Vasco da Gama	1989 Campeonato Brasileiro Série A champions
(Rio Grande do Sul) Grêmio	1989 Copa do Brasil champions

== Matches ==
The Supercopa matches was also valid for the 1990 Copa Libertadores group stage.

=== First leg ===
14 March 1990

Grêmio (Rio Grande do Sul)	2–0	(Rio de Janeiro (state)) Vasco da Gama
Nílson 68'; Darci 76'	Report

Estádio Olímpico Monumental, Porto Alegre
Attendance: 34,461
Referee: Ulisses da Silva Tavares

Grêmio	Vasco da Gama

GK	1	(Brazil) Mazarópi
DF	2	(Brazil) Alfinete
DF	15	(Brazil) Vilson
DF	6	(Brazil) Luís Eduardo
DF	4	(Brazil) Hélcio
MF	5	(Brazil) Jandir	Booked
MF	8	(Brazil) Cuca	Booked
MF	19	(Brazil) Adílson Heleno	Booked
FW	7	(Brazil) Darci
FW	9	(Brazil) Nílson
FW	11	(Brazil) Paulo Egídio
Substitutes:
GK	12	(Brazil) Gomes
DF	3	(Brazil) Luis Fernando
MF	16	(Brazil) João Antônio
MF	25	(Brazil) Assis
FW	22	(Brazil) Nando
Manager:
(Brazil) Paulo Sérgio Poletto

GK	1	(Brazil) Acácio
DF	2	(Brazil) Winck		Booked
DF	3	(Brazil) Marco Aurélio		Booked
DF	4	(Ecuador) Hólger Quiñónez
DF	6	(Brazil) Mazinho
MF	5	(Brazil) Andrade
MF	8	(Brazil) Tita
MF	7	(Brazil) William		Substituted off
MF	9	(Brazil) Bismarck
FW	10	(Brazil) Roberto Dinamite		Substituted off
FW	11	(Brazil) Bebeto
Substitutes:
MC		(Brazil) Zé do Carmo	Substituted on
FW		(Brazil) Sorato	Substituted on
Manager:
(Brazil) Alcir Portella

=== Second leg ===
18 April 1990

Vasco da Gama (Rio de Janeiro (state))	0–0	(Rio Grande do Sul) Grêmio

Estádio São Januário, Rio de Janeiro
Attendance: 2,932
Referee: Ilton José da Costa

Vasco da Gama	Grêmio

GK	1	(Brazil) Acácio
DF	2	(Brazil) Winck
DF	3	(Brazil) Célio Silva
DF	4	(Brazil) Zé do Carmo
DF	6	(Brazil) Mazinho
MF	5	(Brazil) Andrade	Substituted off
MF	8	(Brazil) Tita
MF	7	(Brazil) Boiadeiro
MF	9	(Brazil) Bismarck
FW	10	(Brazil) Sorato
FW	11	(Brazil) Bebeto
Substitutes:
MF		(Brazil) William	Substituted on
Manager:
(Brazil) Alcir Portella

GK	1	(Brazil) Mazarópi
DF	2	(Brazil) Alfinete
DF	15	(Brazil) Vilson
DF	6	(Brazil) Luís Eduardo
DF	4	(Brazil) Hélcio
MF	5	(Brazil) Jandir	Substituted off
MF	8	(Brazil) Cuca
MF		(Brazil) Lino
FW	7	(Brazil) Darci	Substituted off
FW	9	(Brazil) Nílson
FW	11	(Brazil) Paulo Egídio
Substitutes:
MC	16	(Brazil) João Antônio	Substituted on
FW	22	(Brazil) Nando	Substituted on
Manager:
(Brazil) Evaristo de Macedo
