= Gilson Maciel =

Brazilian footballer (1954–2026)

Personal information
- Full name: Gilson André da Costa Maciel
- Date of birth: 29 October 1968 (age 58)
- Place of birth: Porto Alegre, Rio Grande do Sul, Brazil
- Height: 1.85 m (6 ft 1 in)
- Position: Forward

Youth career
- 1983–1987: Grêmio

Senior career*
Years	Team	Apps	(Gls)
1987–1994	Grêmio	97	(42)
1988	→ Caxias (loan)		
1989	→ Novo Hamburgo (loan)		
1990	→ Bahia (loan)		
1991	→ Figueirense (loan)		
1991	→ Rio Branco-SP (loan)		
1992	→ Brasil de Pelotas (loan)		
1994–1995	Tigres UANL		
1995	Brasil de Pelotas		
1996	Paraná		
1997	15 de Novembro		
1997–1998	Espérance		
1998	Joinville		
1999–2000	Figueirense		
2001	São José-RS		
2002	Ulbra-RS		

International career
1985	Brazil U17		

Managerial career
- 2005: 15 de Novembro (assistant)
- 2008: Criciúma (assistant)
- 2009: Joinville (assistant)
- 2010: Cruzeiro-RS (assistant)
- 2011: Serrano-RJ
- 2012: Imperial-RJ
- 2013: Ferroviário-CE
- 2014: São José-RS
- 2015: São José-RS
- 2016–2017: São Paulo-RS
- 2021: Aimoré
- 2023: Gaúcho
- 2025: Bagé
- 2025–2026: Brasil de Pelotas
- * Club domestic league appearances and goals

Gilson André da Costa Maciel (born 29 October 1968), also known just as Gilson and Gilson Cabeção, is a Brazilian former professional footballer and manager who played as forward.

== Player career ==
A product of Grêmio's youth academy, Gilson rose to prominence particularly during the 1993 season, when he was the top scorer in the Copa do Brasil. He also played for several other teams in Rio Grande do Sul, as well as Tigres UANL and Espérance de Tunis.

== Managerial career ==
Maciel began his career as an assistant coach to Armando Desessards. As a head coach, he started in Rio de Janeiro state football with Serrano, though he primarily managed teams in Rio Grande do Sul. In 2025, he rose to prominence by winning the Copa FGF with Brasil de Pelotas, remaining with the team until May 2026.

== Honours ==
=== Player ===
Grêmio

- Copa do Brasil: 1989, 1994
- Supercopa do Brasil: 1990
- Campeonato Gaúcho: 1987, 1993

Individual

- 1992 Campeonato Gaúcho top scorer: 12 goals
- 1993 Copa do Brasil top scorer: 8 goals

=== Manager ===
Brasil de Pelotas

- Copa FGF: 2025
