= Adílson Heleno =

Brazilian footballer

Personal information
- Full name: Adílson Heleno
- Date of birth: 7 October 1962 (age 64)
- Place of birth: Nova Iguaçu, Brazil
- Height: 1.74 m (5 ft 9 in)
- Position: Midfielder

Youth career
- 1979–1982: Flamengo

Senior career*
Years	Team	Apps	(Gls)
1982–1986	Flamengo	6	(0)
1983	→ Friburguense (loan)		
1983–1984	→ Operário-MS (loan)		
1984	→ Friburguense (loan)		
1985	→ Fortaleza (loan)		
1986	→ Vitória (loan)		
1987–1988	Avaí		
1988–1989	Criciúma		
1989–1990	Grêmio	42	(3)
1990	→ Portuguesa (loan)		
1991	Figueirense		
1992	Atlas		
1992–1993	Avaí		
1994	Marcílio Dias		
1994	Barcelona-ECU		
1995	Boavista		
1995	ABC		
1996	Avaí		
1997	Tubarão		
1997	Fluminense de Feira		
- * Club domestic league appearances and goals as of 8 January 2024

Adílson Heleno (born 7 October 1962), is a Brazilian former professional footballer who played as a midfielder.

== Career ==
Adilson Heleno began his career in Flamengo's youth category, but was little used in the professional team, being loaned most of the time. Thus he was state champion twice, for Operário-MS and Fortaleza.

At the beginning of 1987, he was bought by Avaí from Flamengo, becoming champion and runner-up for 1988 Campeonato Catarinense with 17 goals scored. He transferred to Criciúma in the Brazilian Championship and was elected Silver Ball. The following year he arrived at Grêmio, where he won a series of titles such as the 1989 Copa do Brasil. He played outside Brazil for Atlas and Barcelona Guayaquil, but spent most of his career with football teams in Santa Catarina. He was even honored at the state congress assembly due to his services in local football.

== Honours ==
Operário-MS

- Campeonato Sul-Mato-Grossense: 1983

Fortaleza

- Campeonato Cearense: 1985

Avaí

- Campeonato Catarinense: 1988

Grêmio

- Campeonato Gaúcho: 1989, 1990
- Copa do Brasil: 1989
- Supercopa do Brasil: 1990

ABC

- Campeonato Potiguar: 1995

Individual

- 1988 Bola de Prata
