= Germany national under-17 football team =

Germany Under-17
- Nickname: Die Mannschaft (The Team)
- Association: Deutscher Fußball-Bund
- Confederation: UEFA (Europe)
- Head coach: André Pawlak
- FIFA code: GER
First colours	Second colours

European Championship
- Appearances: 29 (first in 1982)
- Best result: Champions (1984, 1992, 2009, 2023)

FIFA U-17 World Cup
- Appearances: 12 (first in 1985)
- Best result: Champions (2023)
Medal record
FIFA U-17 World Cup
Gold medal – first place	2023 Indonesia	Team
Silver medal – second place	1985 China	Team
Bronze medal – third place	2007 South Korea	Team
Bronze medal – third place	2011 Mexico	Team

Germany national under-17 football team, also known as Germany Under-17s or Germany U17(s), represents Germany in association football at an under-17 age level and is controlled by German Football Association, the governing body for football in Germany.

== Competitive record ==
=== FIFA U-17 World Cup ===
Year	Result	GP	W	D*	L	GF	GA
as West Germany
(China) 1985	Runners-up	6	3	1	2	13	10
(Canada) 1987	Did not qualify						
(Scotland) 1989	Did not qualify						
as Germany
(Italy) 1991	Quarter-finals	4	1	1	2	6	8
(Japan) 1993	Did not qualify						
(Ecuador) 1995	Group stage	3	1	0	2	3	6
(Egypt) 1997	Fourth place	6	2	2	2	6	7
(New Zealand) 1999	Group stage	3	0	2	1	1	2
(Trinidad and Tobago) 2001	Did not qualify						
(Finland) 2003	Did not qualify						
(Peru) 2005	Did not qualify						
(South Korea) 2007	Third place	7	5	1	1	20	11
(Nigeria) 2009	Round of 16	4	1	1	2	10	10
(Mexico) 2011	Third place	7	6	0	1	24	9
(United Arab Emirates) 2013	Did not qualify						
(Chile) 2015	Round of 16	4	2	0	2	9	5
(India) 2017	Quarter-finals	5	3	0	2	10	8
(Brazil) 2019	Did not qualify						
(Indonesia) 2023	Champions	7	5	2	0	18	9
(Qatar) 2025	Round of 32	4	1	2	1	9	3
(Qatar) 2026	Did not qualify						
(Qatar) 2027	To be determined						
(Qatar) 2028	To be determined						
(Qatar) 2029	To be determined						
Total	12/24	60	30	12	18	129	88

=== UEFA European Under-17 Championship ===
Year	Round	Pld	W	D*	L	GF	GA
as West Germany
(Italy) 1982	Runners-up	2	1	0	1	2	2
(West Germany) 1984	Champions	2	2	0	0	7	1
(Hungary) 1985	Group stage	3	1	1	1	3	3
(Greece) 1986	Did not qualify						
(France) 1987	Group stage	3	1	2	0	5	4
(Spain) 1988	Fourth place	5	2	2	1	6	5
(Denmark) 1989	Did not qualify						
(East Germany) 1990	Group stage	3	1	2	0	6	2
as Germany
(Switzerland) 1991	Runners-up	5	2	1	2	8	6
(Cyprus) 1992	Champions	5	4	1	0	8	3
(Turkey) 1993	Did not qualify						
(Republic of Ireland) 1994	Group stage	3	2	0	1	9	6
(Belgium) 1995	Third place	6	4	0	2	12	8
(Austria) 1996	Quarter-finals	4	2	0	2	16	7
(Germany) 1997	Third place	6	5	0	1	13	4
(Scotland) 1998	Did not qualify						
(Czech Republic) 1999	Third place	6	4	0	2	11	6
(Israel) 2000	Quarter-finals	4	2	2	0	8	4
(England) 2001	Quarter-finals	4	2	1	1	12	5
UEFA European Under-17 Championship
(Denmark) 2002	Quarter-finals	4	2	2	0	9	4
(Portugal) 2003	Did not qualify						
(France) 2004	Did not qualify						
(Italy) 2005	Did not qualify						
(Luxembourg) 2006	Fourth place	5	2	2	1	9	2
(Belgium) 2007	Fifth place	4	2	1	1	6	4
(Turkey) 2008	Did not qualify						
(Germany) 2009	Champions	5	5	0	0	13	2
(Liechtenstein) 2010	Did not qualify						
(Serbia) 2011	Runners-up	5	2	1	2	7	8
(Slovenia) 2012	Runners-up	5	4	1	0	7	1
(Slovakia) 2013	Did not qualify						
(Malta) 2014	Group stage	3	0	1	2	1	3
(Bulgaria) 2015	Runners-up	6	4	1	1	9	4
(Azerbaijan) 2016	Semi-finals	5	3	1	1	11	5
(Croatia) 2017	Semi-finals	5	4	1	0	17	2
(England) 2018	Group stage	3	1	0	2	4	8
(Republic of Ireland) 2019	Group stage	3	1	0	2	4	5
(Estonia) ~~2020~~	Cancelled due to the COVID-19 pandemic						
(Cyprus) ~~2021~~	Cancelled due to the COVID-19 pandemic						
(Israel) 2022	Quarter-finals	4	3	1	0	10	3
(Hungary) 2023	Champions	6	4	2	0	16	5
(Cyprus) 2024	Did not qualify						
(Albania) 2025	Group Stage	3	1	0	2	5	5
(Estonia) 2026	Did not qualify						
(Latvia) 2027	To be determined						
(Lithuania) 2028	To be determined						
(Moldova) 2029	To be determined						
Total	4 titles	124	72	26	26	249	122

*Draws include knockout matches decided on penalty kicks.

== Players ==
=== Current squad ===
The following players were selected for the 2026 UEFA Euro Under-17 qualifying matches against North Macedonia, Slovenia and France on 25, 28 and 31 March 2026.

Caps and goals correct as of 31 March 2026, after the match against France.

No.	Pos.	Player	Date of birth (age)	Caps	Goals	Club
1	GK	Leonard Prescott	23 September 2009 (age 17)	9	0	(German Football Association) Bayern Munich
23	GK	Jayden Umukoro	11 May 2009 (age 17)	3	0	(German Football Association) SC Freiburg
12	GK	Tom Walz	24 January 2009 (age 17)	2	0	(German Football Association) VfB Stuttgart
5	DF	Lasse Deutschbein	4 June 2009 (age 17)	11	0	(German Football Association) Schalke 04
22	DF	Nouh Tidjani	4 March 2009 (age 17)	11	0	(German Football Association) TSG Hoffenheim
3	DF	Louis Lemke	8 October 2009 (age 17)	9	3	(German Football Association) Hamburger SV
4	DF	Jerome Diallo	13 June 2009 (age 17)	7	0	(German Football Association) Hertha BSC
18	DF	Joschua Siewert (captain)	23 May 2009 (age 17)	7	0	(German Football Association) Hannover 96
2	DF	Tim Neininger	25 March 2009 (age 17)	6	0	(German Football Association) VfL Wolfsburg
20	DF	Filip Kościerski	18 September 2009 (age 17)	3	0	(German Football Association) VfL Bochum
10	MF	Jannik Veit	9 September 2009 (age 17)	13	3	(German Football Association) SC Freiburg
13	MF	Torben Leis	7 January 2009 (age 17)	9	1	(German Football Association) 1. FC Heidenheim
8	MF	Edin Biber	7 March 2009 (age 17)	9	0	(German Football Association) Borussia Mönchengladbach
16	MF	Till Wegener	1 February 2009 (age 17)	9	0	(German Football Association) Arminia Bielefeld
21	MF	Fadi Zarqelain	3 January 2009 (age 17)	8	1	(German Football Association) Borussia Dortmund
6	MF	Dion Hofmeister	11 July 2009 (age 17)	6	1	(German Football Association) 1. FC Kaiserslautern
14	MF	Daniel Mrohs	4 April 2009 (age 17)	5	0	(German Football Association) Hertha BSC
9	FW	Josef Haßfeld	28 February 2009 (age 17)	12	3	(German Football Association) Eintracht Frankfurt
7	FW	Isaiah Seretis	1 March 2009 (age 17)	12	2	(German Football Association) VfL Wolfsburg
11	FW	Marwan-Omir Mirza	1 September 2009 (age 17)	10	9	(German Football Association) Borussia Dortmund
19	FW	John Davis Meyer	29 July 2009 (age 17)	3	0	(German Football Association) Karlsruher SC

=== Recent call-ups ===
The following players have previously been called up to the Germany under-17 squad within the last twelve months and remain eligible for selection.

Pos.	Player	Date of birth (age)	Caps	Goals	Club	Latest call-up
GK	Fritz Gagzow	16 February 2009 (age 17)	2	0	(Germany) Union Berlin	v. Portugal, 14 January 2026
GK	Philipp Eckle	9 March 2009 (age 17)	3	0	(Germany) FC Augsburg	v. Portugal, 18 February 2026
DF	Xaver Pucci	16 March 2009 (age 17)	9	1	(Germany) Bayern Munich	v. Portugal, 18 February 2026
DF	Tim Radöhl	11 June 2009 (age 17)	7	1	(Germany) 1. FC Heidenheim	v. North Macedonia, 25 March 2026 ^{INJ}
DF	Maximilian Polzin	10 November 2009 (age 16)	7	0	(Germany) Mainz 05	v. Portugal, 18 February 2026
DF	Lenni Strößner	15 January 2009 (age 17)	0	0	(Germany) Borussia Dortmund	v. North Macedonia, 25 March 2026
DF	Paul Tanyi	23 January 2009 (age 17)	0	0	(Germany) Borussia Dortmund	v. North Macedonia, 25 March 2026
DF	Lorent Aliu	14 August 2009 (age 17)	0	0	(Germany) Hertha BSC	v. North Macedonia, 25 March 2026
MF	Manuel Abbey	12 February 2009 (age 17)	4	1	(Germany) RB Leipzig	v. Portugal, 14 January 2026
MF	Albin Kurpejović	21 August 2009 (age 17)	3	0	(Germany) TSG Hoffenheim	v. North Macedonia, 25 March 2026
MF	Luca Hampel	4 June 2009 (age 17)	2	0	(Germany) Mainz 05	v. Denmark, 18 November 2025
MF	Luca Kröger	21 January 2009 (age 17)	2	0	(Germany) VfL Osnabrück	v. Denmark, 18 November 2025
MF	Erblin Osmani	19 May 2009 (age 17)	2	0	(Germany) Bayern Munich	v. Portugal, 14 January 2026
MF	Jan Colles	18 May 2009 (age 17)	0	0	(Germany) 1. FC Köln	v. North Macedonia, 25 March 2026
FW	Ivan Massek	8 June 2009 (age 17)	9	0	(Germany) Bayer Leverkusen	v. Norway, 18 February 2026
FW	Justin Seven-Seven	19 April 2009 (age 17)	5	1	(England) West Bromwich Albion	v. Portugal, 18 February 2026
FW	Kian Speidel	20 February 2009 (age 17)	3	0	(Germany) VfB Stuttgart	v. Portugal, 14 January 2026
FW	Johann Jaensch	4 February 2009 (age 17)	3	0	(Germany) Borussia Dortmund	v. North Macedonia, 25 March 2026
FW	Israel Ogette	25 November 2009 (age 16)	2	0	(Germany) RB Leipzig	v. Denmark, 18 November 2025
FW	Elfried Assiobo-Tipoh	14 December 2009 (age 16)	0	0	(Germany) 1. FC Köln	v. North Macedonia, 25 March 2026

== See also ==
- Germany national football team
- Germany national under-21 football team
- Germany national under-16 football team
- FIFA U-20 World Cup
- FIFA U-17 World Cup
- UEFA European Under-19 Championship
- UEFA European Under-17 Championship

=== Notes ===
1 = as West Germany
2 = as East Germany
