= Peter Jung =

Peter Jung may refer to:

- Peter Jung, character in 10 Years (2011 film)
- Peter Jung (footballer), see 1985 FIFA U-16 World Championship squads
- Peter Jung (politician), see List of German Christian Democratic Union politicians
