= João Antônio =

João Antônio may refer to:

- João Antônio Ferreira Filho (1937–1996), Brazilian journalist
- João Antônio de Oliveira Martíns (born 1966), Brazilian football midfielder
