= Paulo Sérgio Poletto =

Brazilian footballer

Personal information
- Full name: Paulo Sérgio Poletto
- Date of birth: 3 February 1942
- Place of birth: Arroio do Meio, Brazil
- Date of death: 11 April 2014 (aged 72)
- Place of death: Arroio do Meio, Brazil
- Position: Defender

Senior career*
Years	Team	Apps	(Gls)
1960s	Internacional		
1960s	Atlético Paranaense		

Managerial career
- 1975–1976: São José-RS
- 1977: Joinville
- 1979–1980: Barcelona SC
- 1981: 9 de Octubre
- 1982: Coritiba
- 1982: Grêmio Maringá
- 1982: Moto Club
- 1983: Operário Ferroviário
- 1984: Atlético Paranaense
- 1984: Santa Cruz-RS
- 1986: Brasil de Pelotas
- 1986: Passo Fundo
- 1987: Caxias
- 1988: Criciúma
- 1989: Ypiranga-RS
- 1989: Blumenau
- 1990: Grêmio
- 1991: Ypiranga-RS
- 1991: Novo Hamburgo
- 1993: Passo Fundo
- 1994: Pelotas
- 1995: São Luiz
- 1997: Passo Fundo
- 1998: Guarani-VA
- 1998: Avenida
- 1999: Inter de Santa Maria
- 2000: Santa Cruz-RS
- 2006: Ypiranga-RS
- 2009–2010: Passo Fundo
- * Club domestic league appearances and goals as of 14 March 2024

Paulo Sérgio Poletto (3 February 1942 – 11 April 2014), was a Brazilian professional footballer and manager, who played as a defender.

== Playing career ==
There are few details of Poletto's career as a player, who played professionally for SC Internacional and Athletico Paranaense during the 1960s.

== Managerial career ==
Poletto coached numerous teams from the southern region of Brazil, especially teams from Rio Grande do Sul. His most successful efforts were the title of the second state division with Ypiranga de Erechim and the 1990 Supercopa do Brasil with Grêmio.

== Honours ==
=== Player ===
Internacional

- Campeonato Gaúcho: 1961

=== Manager ===
Ypiranga

- Campeonato Gaúcho Série A2: 1989

Grêmio

- Supercopa do Brasil: 1990

== Death ==
Poletto died in his hometown, Arroio do Meio, 11 April 2014 at the age of 72, a victim of kidney cancer.
