= Jandir Bugs =

Brazilian footballer

Jandir
Personal information
- Full name: Jandir Bugs
- Date of birth: 9 January 1961 (age 65)
- Place of birth: Tenente Portela, Brazil
- Position: Defensive midfielder

Senior career*
Years	Team	Apps	(Gls)
1982–1989	Fluminense	319	(12)
1989–1992	Grêmio	160	(7)
1993	Internacional		
1994	Fluminense		
1996	Tubarão		

International career
1984–1985	Brazil	5	(0)
- * Club domestic league appearances and goals as of 16 May 2024

Jandir Bugs (born 9 January 1961) is a Brazilian former professional footballer who played as a defensive midfielder.

== Career ==
Jandir made history first for Fluminense, especially for the Brazilian title in 1984, and later for Grêmio, participating in the first Copa do Brasil title in 1989.

He also played for the Brazilian national team between 1984 and 1985, playing in five friendly matches.

== Honours ==
Fluminense

- Campeonato Brasileiro Série A: 1984
- Campeonato Carioca: 1983, 1984, 1985
- Taça Guanabara: 1983, 1985
- Tournoi de Paris: 1987
- Kirin Cup Soccer: 1987

Grêmio

- Copa do Brasil: 1989
- Supercopa do Brasil: 1990
- Campeonato Gaúcho: 1989, 1990
