= 1985 FIFA U-16 World Championship =

FIFA U-16 World Tournament for the Kodak Cup 1985 FIFA U-16世界锦标赛

Tournament details
- Host country: China
- Dates: July 31 – August 11
- Teams: 16 (from 6 confederations)
- Venues: 4 (in 4 host cities)

Final positions
- Champions: Nigeria (1st title)
- Runners-up: West Germany
- Third place: Brazil
- Fourth place: Guinea

Tournament statistics
- Matches played: 32
- Goals scored: 91 (2.84 per match)
- Attendance: 1,230,976 (38,468 per match)
- Top scorer: (West Germany) Marcel Witeczek (8 goals)
- Best player: (Brazil) William
- Fair play award: West Germany

The 1985 FIFA U-16 World Championship, the first edition of the tournament, was held in the cities of Beijing, Shanghai, Tianjin, and Dalian in the People's Republic of China from July 31, 1985, to August 11, 1985. Players born after August 1, 1968, could participate in this tournament. The total attendance for the tournament was a record 1,230,976. The 2017 U-17 World Cup surpassed this, with a record attendance of 1,347,133.

== Venues ==
Beijing	Dalian	Shanghai	Tianjin
Workers' Stadium	People's Stadium	Hongkou Stadium	Minyuan Stadium
Capacity: 80,000	Capacity: 40,000	Capacity: 32,220	Capacity: 18,000
1985 FIFA U-16 World Championship is located in China

== Qualified teams ==
Confederation	Qualifying Tournament	Qualifier(s)
AFC (Asia)	Host nation	China
AFC (Asia)	1985 AFC U-16 Championship	Qatar; Saudi Arabia
CAF (Africa)	1985 African U-16 Qualifying for World Cup	Congo; Guinea; Nigeria
CONCACAF (Central, North America and Caribbean)	1985 CONCACAF U-16 Championship	Costa Rica; Mexico
CONCACAF (Central, North America and Caribbean)	1983 CONCACAF U-17 Championship	United States
CONMEBOL (South America)	1985 South American U-16 Championship	Argentina; Brazil
CONMEBOL (South America)	Invitee	Bolivia
OFC (Oceania)	1983 OFC U-17 Championship	Australia
UEFA (Europe)	1982 UEFA European Under-16 Championship	Italy
UEFA (Europe)	1984 UEFA European Under-16 Championship	West Germany
UEFA (Europe)	Invitee	Hungary

== Squads ==
For full squad lists for the 1985 U-16 World Championship see 1985 FIFA U-16 World Championship squads.

== Referees ==
Asia

- (Saudi Arabia) Fallaj Al-Shanar
- (China) Chen Shengcai
- (China) Cui Baoyin
- (China) Zhang Daqiao
- (Qatar) Hassan Abdullah Al Mullah

Africa

- (Republic of the Congo) Simon Bantsimba
- (Guinea) Karim Camara
- (Niger) Alhati Salahudeen

CONCACAF

- (Costa Rica) Carlos Alfaro
- (United States) Angelo Bratsis
- (Mexico) Joaquin Urrea Reyes

South America

- (Brazil) Arnaldo Cézar Coelho
- (Argentina) Carlos Espósito
- (Bolivia) Juan Ortube

Europe

- (Hungary) Miklós Nagy
- (Italy) Claudio Pieri
- (West Germany) Karl-Heinz Tritschler

Oceania

- (Australia) Chris Bambridge

== Group stages ==
=== Group A ===
Pos	Team	Pld	W	D	L	GF	GA	GD	Pts	Qualification
1	China (H)	3	2	1	0	6	3	+3	5	Advanced to knockout stage
2	Guinea	3	2	0	1	5	2	+3	4	Advanced to knockout stage
3	United States	3	1	0	2	3	5	−2	2	
4	Bolivia	3	0	1	2	2	6	−4	1	

(H) Hosts
31 July 1985
19:00

China	1–1	Bolivia
Xie Yuxin 28' (pen.)	Report	Sánchez 13'

Workers' Stadium, Beijing
Attendance: 80,000
Referee: Miklos Nagy (Hungary)
31 July 1985
20:45

Guinea	1–0	United States
Koita 68'	Report

Workers' Stadium, Beijing
Attendance: 80,000
Referee: Fallaj Khuzam Al Shanar (Saudi Arabia)

2 August 1985
19:00

China	2–1	Guinea
Xie Yuxin 18' (pen.); Guo Zhuang 27'	Report	Sylla 42'

Workers' Stadium, Beijing
Attendance: 40,000
Referee: Carlos Alfaro Venegas
2 August 1985
20:45

Bolivia	1–2	United States
Etcheverry 31'	Report	McPhail 51'; Pride 64'

Workers' Stadium, Beijing
Attendance: 40,000
Referee: Alhati Salahudeen (Niger)

4 August 1985
19:00

China	3–1	United States
Cao Xiandong 20'; Guo Zhuang 22'; Sun Bowei 25'	Report	Pride 75'

Workers' Stadium, Beijing
Attendance: 60,000
Referee: Carlos Espósito
4 August 1985
20:45

Bolivia	0–3	Guinea
	Report	Soumah 32'; Touré 37'; Koita 55'

Workers' Stadium, Beijing
Attendance: 60,000
Referee: Miklos Nagy (Hungary)

=== Group B ===
Pos	Team	Pld	W	D	L	GF	GA	GD	Pts	Qualification
1	Australia	3	3	0	0	4	1	+3	6	Advanced to knockout stage
2	West Germany	3	1	1	1	5	3	+2	3	Advanced to knockout stage
3	Argentina	3	1	1	1	5	4	+1	3	
4	Congo	3	0	0	3	4	10	−6	0	

31 July 1985
19:00

Australia	1–0	Argentina
Naven 28'	Report

Minyuan Stadium, Tianjin
Attendance: 20,000
Referee: Joaquin Urrea Reyes
31 July 1985
20:45

Congo	1–4	West Germany
Kakou 73'	Report	Mirwald 21'; Witeczek 38', 65'; Dammeier 56'

Minyuan Stadium, Tianjin
Attendance: 20,000
Referee: Chen Shengcai

2 August 1985
19:00

Australia	2–1	Congo
Trimboli 19'; Thodis 42'	Report	Kakou 76'

Minyuan Stadium, Tianjin
Attendance: 20,000
Referee: Hassan Abdullah Al Mullah
2 August 1985
20:45

Argentina	1–1	West Germany
Cáceres 16'	Report	Gabriel 15'

Minyuan Stadium, Tianjin
Attendance: 20,000
Referee: Claudio Pieri

4 August 1985
19:00

Australia	1–0	West Germany
Trimboli 12'	Report

Minyuan Stadium, Tianjin
Attendance: 20,000
Referee: Karim Camara
4 August 1985
20:45

Argentina	4–2	Congo
Maradona 23' (pen.), 24'; Frutos 38'; Álvarez 63'	Report	Salles 46'; Mantot 60' (pen.)

Minyuan Stadium, Tianjin
Attendance: 20,000
Referee: Joaquin Urrea Reyes

=== Group C ===
Pos	Team	Pld	W	D	L	GF	GA	GD	Pts	Qualification
1	Saudi Arabia	3	2	1	0	7	2	+5	5	Advanced to knockout stage
2	Nigeria	3	2	1	0	4	0	+4	5	Advanced to knockout stage
3	Italy	3	1	0	2	3	4	−1	2	
4	Costa Rica	3	0	0	3	1	9	−8	0	

31 July 1985
19:00

Saudi Arabia	4–1	Costa Rica
Al Dosary 25'; Al Suraiti 63'; Al Razgan 66'; Al Fahad 68'	Report	Medford 12'

Dalian People's Stadium, Dalian
Attendance: 35,000
Referee: Arnaldo Coelho
31 July 1985
20:45

Nigeria	1–0	Italy
Momoh 67'	Report

Dalian People's Stadium, Dalian
Attendance: 35,000
Referee: Angelo Bratsis

2 August 1985
19:00

Saudi Arabia	0–0	Nigeria
	Report

Dalian People's Stadium, Dalian
Attendance: 36,000
Referee: Angelo Bratsis
2 August 1985
20:45

Costa Rica	0–2	Italy
	Report	Caverzan 17'; Bresciani 46'

Dalian People's Stadium, Dalian
Attendance: 30,000
Referee: Simon Bantsimba

4 August 1985
19:00

Saudi Arabia	3–1	Italy
Al Boushal 4', 61'; Al Razgan 78' (pen.)	Report	Bresciani 37'

Dalian People's Stadium, Dalian
Attendance: 30,000
Referee: Arnaldo Coelho
4 August 1985
20:45

Costa Rica	0–3	Nigeria
	Report	Igbinoba 62'; Momoh 70'; Babatunde 72'

Dalian People's Stadium, Dalian
Attendance: 30,000
Referee: Zhang Daqiao

=== Group D ===
Pos	Team	Pld	W	D	L	GF	GA	GD	Pts	Qualification
1	Hungary	3	2	1	0	4	0	+4	5	Advanced to knockout stage
2	Brazil	3	2	0	1	4	2	+2	4	Advanced to knockout stage
3	Mexico	3	1	1	1	3	3	0	3	
4	Qatar	3	0	0	3	2	8	−6	0	

31 July 1985
19:00

Qatar	1–2	Brazil
Al Abdulla 50'	Report	Bismarck 9'; William 58'

Hongkou Stadium, Shanghai
Attendance: 30,000
Referee: Christopher Bambridge
31 July 1985
20:45

Mexico	0–0	Hungary
	Report

Hongkou Stadium, Shanghai
Attendance: 30,000
Referee: Cui Baoyin

2 August 1985
19:00

Qatar	1–3	Mexico
Al Mohannadi 5' (pen.)	Report	Cortes 36'; Ledesma 52', 77' (pen.)

Hongkou Stadium, Shanghai
Attendance: 25,000
Referee: Karl-Heinz Tritschler
2 August 1985
20:45

Brazil	0–1	Hungary
	Report	Kanál 55'

Hongkou Stadium, Shanghai
Attendance: 25,000
Referee: Christopher Bambridge

4 August 1985
19:00

Qatar	0–3	Hungary
	Report	Huszák 9'; Marik 38'; Kanál 80'

Hongkou Stadium, Shanghai
Attendance: 25,000
Referee: Juan Ortube Vargas
4 August 1985
20:45

Brazil	2–0	Mexico
William 60'; Mauricio 67'	Report

Hongkou Stadium, Shanghai
Attendance: 25,000
Referee: Karl-Heinz Tritschler

== Knockout stage ==
Quarter-finals
August 7 – Beijing
China	2
West Germany	4
August 7 – Dalian
Saudi Arabia	1
Brazil	2
August 7 – Tianjin
Australia	0 (2)
Guinea (p)	0 (4)
August 7 – Shanghai
Hungary	1
Nigeria	3

Semi-finals
August 9 – Beijing
West Germany	4
Brazil	3
August 9 – Shanghai
Nigeria (p)	1 (4)
Guinea	1 (2)

Final
August 11 – Beijing
West Germany	0
Nigeria	2
Third place
August 11 – Beijing
Brazil	4
Guinea	1

=== Quarter-finals ===
7 August 1985
19:30

China	2–4	West Germany
Guo Zhuang 14'; Tu Shengqiao 39'	Report	Witeczek 10', 37', 45'; Bi Sheng 35' (o.g.)

Workers' Stadium, Beijing
Attendance: 80,000
Referee: Arnaldo Cézar Coelho
7 August 1985
19:30

Australia	0–0 (a.e.t.) (2–4 pen.)	Guinea
	Report

Hongqiao Stadium, Tianjin
Attendance: 20,000
Referee: Claudio Pieri

7 August 1985
19:30

Saudi Arabia	1–2	Brazil
Al Razgan 52' (pen.)	Report	William 38', 49' (pen.)

Dalian People's Stadium, Dalian
Attendance: 30,000
Referee: Carlos Alfaro Venegas
7 August 1985
19:30

Hungary	1–3	Nigeria
Marik 2'	Report	Momoh 17', 58'; Igbinoba 60'

Hongkou Stadium, Shanghai
Attendance: 25,000
Referee: Christopher Bambridge

=== Semi-finals ===
9 August 1985
19:30

West Germany	4–3	Brazil
Witeczek 15', 57', 66'; Konerding 47'	Report	Bismarck 6'; Andre Cruz 37'; Rodrigues 70'

Workers' Stadium, Beijing
Attendance: 50,000
Referee: Joaquin Urrea Reyes

9 August 1985
19:30

Nigeria	1–1 (a.e.t.) (4–2 pen.)	Guinea
Atere 10'	Report	Soumah 20'

Hongkou Stadium, Shanghai
Attendance: 30,000
Referee: Carlos Espósito

=== Third place play-off ===
11 August 1985
17:30

Brazil	4–1	Guinea
Marques 11'; Mauricio 42'; William 51'; Bismarck 73'	Report	Sylla 65'

Workers' Stadium, Beijing
Attendance: 80,000
Referee: Cui Baoyin

=== Final ===
11 August 1985
19:30

West Germany	0–2	Nigeria
	Report	Akpoborie 4'; Igbinoba 79'

Workers' Stadium, Beijing
Attendance: 80,000
Referee: Christopher Bambridge

== Result ==
1985 FIFA U-16 World Championship winners

Nigeria
First title

== Goalscorers ==
Marcel Witeczek of West Germany won the Golden Shoe award for scoring eight goals. In total, 91 goals were scored by 56 different players, with only one of them credited as own goal.

8 goals

- (West Germany) Marcel Witeczek

5 goals

- (Brazil) William

4 goals

- (Nigeria) Billa Momoh

3 goals

- (Brazil) Bismarck Barreto Faria
- (China) Guo Zhuang
- (Nigeria) Victor Igbinoba
- (Saudi Arabia) Abdulaziz Al Razgan

2 goals

- (Argentina) Hugo Maradona
- (Australia) Paul Trimboli
- (Brazil) Mauricio
- (China) Xie Yuxin
- (Republic of the Congo) Herve Kakou
- (Guinea) Mohamed Soumah
- (Guinea) Mohamed Sylla
- (Guinea) Salifou Koita
- (Hungary) László Marik
- (Hungary) Zoltán Kanál
- (Italy) Giorgio Bresciani
- (Mexico) Elias Ledesma
- (Saudi Arabia) Boushal Al Boushal
- (United States) Curtis Pride

1 goal

- (Argentina) Diego Álvarez
- (Argentina) Fernando Cáceres
- (Argentina) Lorenzo Frutos
- (Australia) Craig Naven
- (Australia) Stan Thodis
- (Bolivia) Erwin Sánchez
- (Bolivia) Marco Etcheverry
- (Brazil) Andre Cruz
- (Brazil) Marques
- (Brazil) Natalino Rodrigues Antunes
- (China) Cao Xiandong
- (China) Sun Bowei
- (China) Tu Shengqiao
- (Republic of the Congo) Eric Mantot
- (Republic of the Congo) Etienne Salles
- (Costa Rica) Hernán Medford
- (Guinea) Lamine Touré (Guinean football player)
- (Hungary) Zsolt Huszák
- (Italy) Andrea Caverzan
- (Mexico) Francisco Cortes
- (Nigeria) Fatai Atere
- (Nigeria) Jonathan Akpoborie
- (Nigeria) Joseph Babatunde
- (Qatar) Adel Al Abdulla
- (Qatar) Saleh Al Mohannadi
- (Saudi Arabia) Adel Al Dosary
- (Saudi Arabia) Nasser Al Fahad
- (Saudi Arabia) Saadoun Al Suraiti
- (United States) Larry McPhail
- (West Germany) Detlev Dammeier
- (West Germany) Dirk Konerding
- (West Germany) Helmut Gabriel
- (West Germany) Klaus Mirwald

Own goal

- (China) Bi Sheng (playing against West Germany)

== Final ranking ==
Rank	Team	Pld	W	D	L	GF	GA	GD	Pts
1	Nigeria	6	4	2	0	10	2	+8	10
2	West Germany	6	3	1	2	13	10	+3	7
3	Brazil	6	4	0	2	13	8	+5	8
4	Guinea	6	2	2	2	7	7	0	6
Eliminated in the quarter-finals
5	Australia	4	3	1	0	4	1	+3	7
6	Saudi Arabia	4	2	1	1	8	4	+4	5
7	Hungary	4	2	1	1	5	3	+2	5
8	China	4	2	1	1	8	7	+1	5
Eliminated at the group stage
9	Argentina	3	1	1	1	5	4	+1	3
10	Mexico	3	1	1	1	3	3	0	3
11	Italy	3	1	0	2	3	4	–1	2
12	United States	3	1	0	2	3	5	–2	2
13	Bolivia	3	0	1	2	2	6	–4	1
14	Congo	3	0	0	3	4	10	–6	0
15	Qatar	3	0	0	3	2	8	–6	0
16	Costa Rica	3	0	0	3	1	9	–8	0
