= Oliveira Martins =

Oliveira Martins may refer to:

- Guilherme d'Oliveira Martins, Portuguese politician
- Joaquim Pedro de Oliveira Martins, Portuguese politician
- João Antônio (footballer), Brazilian footballer (his full name is João Antônio de Oliveira Martíns)
