= Alfinete =

Brazilian footballer and manager (born 1961)

Personal information
- Full name: Carlos Alberto Dario de Oliveira
- Date of birth: February 1, 1961 (age 65)
- Place of birth: Jales, São Paulo, Brazil
- Positions: Right back; right wing back

Senior career*
Years	Team	Apps	(Gls)
1978–1982	XV de Jaú		
1982–1984	Corinthians		
1984–1985	Ponte Preta		
1985–1987	Joinville		
1987–1991	Grêmio		
1991–1993	Atlético Mineiro		
1993	Ituano		
1993	Vila Nova		
1993	Grêmio		
1994	Fluminense		

Managerial career
- 1996: XV de Jaú (assistant)
- 1999: Barretos
- 2000: Anápolis
- 2002: Goiatuba
- 2003: Grêmio Inhumense
- 2003: Anápolis
- 2004: Luziânia
- 2004: Goiatuba
- 2005: Rioverdense
- 2006–2007: Toledo
- 2008: Grêmio Anápolis
- 2008: Itumbiara
- 2008: Brasiliense
- 2009: Santa Helena
- 2009: Noroeste
- 2000: Anápolis
- 2010: AA Goiatuba
- 2014: Anapolina
- 2015: Avenida
- * Club domestic league appearances and goals as of May 21, 2008

Carlos Alberto Dario de Oliveira, usually known as Alfinete, (born February 1, 1961) is a retired professional Brazilian footballer who played as a right back for several Campeonato Brasileiro Série A clubs.

== Nickname ==
Carlos Alberto Dario de Oliveira was nicknamed Alfinete because he was very thin and wore a black power hairstyle, making him look like a pin.

== Playing career ==
Alfinete started his career playing for XV de Jaú, but after four years he moved to Corinthians, where, as a member of the Corinthians Democracy, scored 3 goals in 107 matches played for the club. He played for Grêmio from 1987 to 1991, winning the Copa do Brasil in 1989 and the Campeonato Gaúcho four times, returning to the Porto Alegre club in 1993. Alfinete won the Campeonato Mineiro in 1991 and the Copa CONMEBOL in 1992 while playing for Atlético Mineiro. In 1994, playing for Fluminense, he retired.

== Managerial career ==
He started his managerial career in 1996, when he was hired as XV de Jaú's head coach, after being Cilinho's assistant manager. He managed several Goiás state clubs, such as Rioverdense, Itumbiara and Grêmio Anápolis.

== Honors ==
Alfinete won the following honors during his playing career:

Club	Competition	Seasons
Atlético Mineiro	Campeonato Mineiro	1991
Atlético Mineiro	Copa CONMEBOL	1992
Corinthians	Campeonato Paulista	1982, 1983
Grêmio	Campeonato Gaúcho	1987, 1988, 1989, 1990
Grêmio	Copa do Brasil	1989
Grêmio	Supercopa do Brasil	1990
Joinville	Campeonato Catarinense	1985
Vila Nova	Campeonato Goiano	1993
