= Homero Cavalheiro =

Brazilian footballer

Personal information
- Full name: Homero Gomes Cavalheiro
- Date of birth: 10 July 1947
- Place of birth: Porto Alegre, Brazil
- Date of death: 4 April 2021 (aged 73)
- Place of death: Porto Alegre, Brazil
- Position: Centre-back

Youth career
- Cruzeiro-RS

Senior career*
Years	Team	Apps	(Gls)
1964–1966	Cruzeiro-RS		
1967	Brasil de Pelotas		

Managerial career
- 1981–1984: Internacional (youth)
- 1985: Brazil U17
- 1986–1987: Internacional
- 1987: Figueirense
- 1988: Caxias
- 1988: Avaí
- 1988: XV de Jaú
- 1989: Brazil U17
- 1990: Aimoré
- 1990: Passo Fundo
- 1990: Atlético Goianiense
- 1991: Atlético Paranaense
- 1991–1992: Atlético Goianiense
- 1993: Esportivo
- 1996–1997: Anápolis
- 1997: Náutico
- 1998: Brasil de Pelotas
- 2001: Veranópolis
- 2001: América-RN
- 2002: ABC
- 2002–2003: Coríntians de Caicó
- 2004: Angra dos Reis
- * Club domestic league appearances and goals as of 21 February 2024

Homero Cavalheiro (10 July 1947 – 4 April 2021) was a Brazilian professional footballer and manager, who played as a centre-back.

== Playing career ==
As a player Homero didn't have much prominence in his career. He started at Cruzeiro de Porto Alegre in 1964 and played for the club until 1966, in the 1967 Campeonato Gaúcho, he defended Brasil de Pelotas. He also has spells attributed to Ypiranga de Erechim and EC Vitória de Salvador.

== Managerial career ==
As a manager, Homero started in the youth categories of SC Internacional. In 1985 and 1989, he was the Brazilian coach at the FIFA U-17 World Cup. He also coached professional teams throughout Brazil, with emphasis on Internacional and Atlético Goianiense, where he was Série C champion in 1990.

== Personal life ==
Upon retiring as a manager, Homero became the owner of a gym in the city of Porto Alegre, business he ran until his death.

== Honours ==
=== Manager ===
Atlético Goianiense

- Campeonato Brasileiro Série C: 1990

== Death ==
Homero Cavalheiro died 4 April 2021, aged 73 in Porto Alegre, victim of COVID-19.
