= József Ördög =

Hungarian footballer (born 1969)

Personal information
- Date of birth: June 30, 1969 (age 57)
- Place of birth: Hungary
- Position: Striker

Senior career*
Years	Team	Apps	(Gls)
1985–1995	ETO FC Győr	45	(2)
1989	→ Szombathelyi Haladás (loan)	5	(1)
1993–1995	→ Anger réti SFAC 1900 SE (loan)	22	(8)
1996	SKN St. Pölten	7	(0)
1997–1999	BFC Siófok	81	(8)
2000	FC Jazz	25	(2)
2001	Egri FC	1	(0)
2001–2002	Hà Nội FC		
- * Club domestic league appearances and goals

József Ördög (born 30 June 1969) is a Hungarian former footballer.

== Early life ==
He joined the youth academy of Hungarian side ETO FC Győr at the age of sixteen. He was described as a "child prodigy" in Hungarian football.

== Career ==
He started his career with Hungarian side ETO FC Győr. In 1989, he was sent on loan to Hungarian side Szombathelyi Haladás. In 1993, he was sent on loan to Hungarian side Anger réti SFAC 1900 SE. In 1996, he signed for Austrian side SKN St. Pölten. In 1997, he signed for Hungarian side BFC Siófok. In 2000, he signed for Finnish side FC Jazz. In 2001, he signed for Hungarian side Egri FC. After that, he signed for Vietnamese side Hà Nội FC. He helped the club achieve promotion.

== Personal life ==
He is a native of Dunaszeg, Hungary. After retiring from professional football, he worked as a youth manager.
