= Ousmane Fernández =

Guinean footballer

Personal information
- Date of birth: 4 February 1969 (age 57)
- Position: Defender

Senior career*
Years	Team	Apps	(Gls)
- ASFAG

International career
1988–1998	Guinea	42	(0)
- * Club domestic league appearances and goals

Ousmane Fernández (born 4 February 1969) is a Guinean former footballer. He played for the Guinea national football team from 1988 to 1998. He was also named in Guinea's squad for the 1998 African Cup of Nations tournament.
