= João Antônio (footballer) =

Brazilian footballer

Personal information
- Full name: João Antônio de Oliveira Martíns
- Date of birth: 14 June 1966 (age 60)
- Place of birth: Porto Alegre, Brazil
- Height: 1.72 m (5 ft 8 in)
- Position: Defensive midfielder

Youth career
- Grêmio

Senior career*
Years	Team	Apps	(Gls)
1984–1991	Grêmio		
1989	→ Grêmio Maringá (loan)		
1991–1995	Paraná		
1995	Atlético Paranaense		
1995–1996	Bahia		
1996–1997	Grêmio		
1997–1998	Mogi Mirim		
1998	Internacional		
1998	Figueirense		
1999	Joinville		
2000	América-SP		

International career
1985	Brazil U20		
- * Club domestic league appearances and goals as of 16 May 2024

João Antônio de Oliveira Martíns (born 14 June 1966), simply known as João Antônio, is a Brazilian former professional footballer who played as a defensive midfielder.

== Career ==
Revealed by the youth sectors of Grêmio FBPA, João Antônio played most of his career for the club, and two spells from 1984 to 1991 and later in 1996–1997, making a total of 210 appearances in addition to numerous achievements. He also had a notable spell at Paraná Clube, having been part of three state titles and Série B in 1992. After finishing his career as a player, he graduated in physical education.

João Antônio was also part of the Brazil under-20 team in 1985, becoming South American and World Champion.

== Honours ==
Grêmio

- Campeonato Brasileiro Série A: 1996
- Copa do Brasil: 1997
- Supercopa do Brasil: 1990
- Recopa Sudamericana: 1996
- Campeonato Gaúcho: 1985, 1986, 1987, 1988, 1990, 1996
- Phillips Cup: 1986

Paraná

- Campeonato Brasileiro Série B: 1992
- Campeonato Paranaense: 1991, 1993, 1994

Athletico Paranaense

- Campeonato Brasileiro Série B: 1995

Brazil U20

- FIFA U-20 World Cup: 1985
- South American U-20 Championship: 1985
