= Fatai Atere =

Nigerian footballer (born 1971)

Fatai Atere MON (born 1 August 1971 in Lagos, Nigeria) is a former Nigerian footballer.

== Career ==
Atere was a member of the Igbobi College team that won the Principal Cup for the first time in the school's history after 38 years. That got him a call to the national camp. He also played for youth side Felele FC, Greater Tomorrow Football Club and the YSFON football Club that represented Nigeria internationally, notably in the United States, where they won the gold medal in the World series of soccer tournaments in 1984. He was part of the clubs IBWA-Afribank and Bank of the North Kano, while playing for National Team in 1988, before he relocated to England to join Tottenham Hotspur. His career was cut short however, when the Nigeria Football Association denied him transfer clearance under secretary Okpomo. After moving to the United States in 1990, he was named the Commissioner for the NSF-USA Nigeria Soccer Tournament.

== International career ==
Atere played for the Golden Eaglets in the 1st Kodak Under 17 World Cup in China, and won the cup by defeating West Germany in the final. He captained the Golden Eaglets in the Canadian under-16 World Championship two years later, and became the runner up to USSR.

He played for the Flying Eagles in friendly games all over Africa, particularly in the ECOWAS Cup in Burkina Faso, in 1987.

== Coaching career ==
After relocating to the United States of America in 1990, Atere was named the managing director of the EJJE Youth Soccer Academy in Tampa, Florida. He guest coaches nationally promoting youth soccer development.

== Personal ==
A street in Mushin, Lagos was named after him by the Nigerian Government, for his achievements, called "Fatai Atere Way". He is also a Member of the Order of the Niger.
