= Lucky Agbonsevbafe =

Nigerian footballer

Lucky Agbonsevbafe (born 12 August 1969) is a former Nigerian footballer. He was a member of the Nigerian team that won the 1st edition of the 1985 Kodak/FIFA U-16 World Championship in China. He was part of the Nigerian U-20 team at the 1987 FIFA World Youth Championship in Chile and also was part of Nigeria's soccer team at the 1988 Summer Olympics in Seoul.

Agbonsevbafe is a Latter-day Saint and was the first Latter-day Saint to represent Nigeria at the Olympics. He held the record for the most saves for a goalkeeper in Nigerian football history.
