= Acácio (footballer) =

Brazilian footballer (born 1959)

Personal information
- Full name: Acácio Cordeiro Barreto
- Date of birth: 20 January 1959 (age 67)
- Place of birth: Campos dos Goytacazes, Brazil
- Height: 1.87 m (6 ft 2 in)

Senior career*
Years	Team	Apps	(Gls)
1978–1979	Americano	0	(0)
1980–1982	Serrano	0	(0)
1982–1991	Vasco da Gama	162	(0)
1991–1992	Tirsense	33	(0)
1992–1995	Beira-Mar	84	(0)
1995	Madureira	0	(0)
Total		450	(0)

International career
1986–1990	Brazil	7	(0)

Managerial career
- 1995: Beira-Mar (interim)
- 2009–2010: Ceará (assistant)
- 2010–2011: Vasco da Gama (assistant)
- 2011: Americano
- 2012: Olaria
- 2012: Americano
- 2013: Americano
- 2018: Madureira (caretaker)
- * Club domestic league appearances and goals

Acácio Cordeiro Barreto (born 20 January 1959), best known as Acácio, is a Brazilian former professional footballer who played as a goalkeeper, best known for his performances for Vasco da Gama.

Acácio was born in Campos dos Goytacazes, Rio de Janeiro State. During his career (1978–1996) he played for Americano, Serrano, Vasco da Gama, Madureira and in Portugal with Tirsense and Beira-Mar. He won three Campeonato Carioca (1982, 1987, 1988) and one Campeonato Brasileiro Série A (1989). For the Brazil national team he played seven matches in 1989, and was part of the 1990 FIFA World Cup roster as an unused substitute.

He was assistant coach Paulo Cesar Gusmao in Ceará and Vasco da Gama. In 2011, he began his coaching career in Americano, revealed that the club as a player. months after hit to be the commander of Olaria, where he stayed for a short time. months later, he returned to command the Americano.
