= Ramón Raya =

Mexican footballer and manager (born 1968)

Personal information
- Full name: Ramón Raya Mejía
- Date of birth: 8 September 1968 (age 58)
- Place of birth: Mexico City, Mexico
- Height: 1.78 m (5 ft 10 in)
- Position: Forward

Senior career*
Years	Team	Apps	(Gls)
1985–1986	Tampico Madero		
1986–1990	UNAM		
1990–1991	Querétaro		
1991–1992	Toros Neza		
1995–1996	Marte		
1996	Hawaii Tsunami		

Managerial career
- 2005–2019: Mexico (beach)
- 2012–2019: Mexico (futsal)
- 2020–2023: Denton Diablos FC
- 2024: Los Aliens 1021 (AKL)
- * Club domestic league appearances and goals

Ramón Raya Mejía (born September 8, 1968) is a Mexican football manager and former player.

He debuted with Tampico-Madero as a forward in 1985 and left the team in 1996.

== Player ==
He was the founder of the football school of Club America where he reached the first team. In a controversial decision he emigrated to make his debut in the first division. He was a player of Tampico-Madero (1985–1986), Club Universidad Nacional, PUMAS (1986–1990), Querétaro FC (1990–1991), Toros Neza (1991–1992), Club Deportivo Marte (1995–1996) and Hawaii Tsunami of the USISL in 1996. He was selected for the 1985 FIFA U-16 World Cup, being the MVP of the CONCACAF QUALIFIER and was designated the best offensive midfielder in the World Cup. He was international U-20 for Mexico at the Trinidad and Tobago qualifier in 1986 and captain of the U-23 team that participated in the Toulon Hopes Tournament of 1988. In 1988 he was nominated to the Mexico national team by Mario Velarde, but a right ankle injury kept him away from play for 4 years. His career as a footballer ended after was short after several operations on both ankles.

== Coach ==
He studied communication sciences at Universidad Intercontinental and completed an MBA that specialized in marketing at the Universidad Anáhuac del Sur. He graduated as a Professional Technical Director in the FMF ENDIT in 1998 and studied the MINAF of the Cruyff Institute in 2014. In 2001, when beach soccer was excluded from FIFA, he learned the rules from a Brazilian beach soccer manager to train the Mexican team in a Foursquare held in Acapulco where ex-players like Jorge Camposy Adrián Chávez played, to later travel to a Mundialito in Portugal. He was coach of Atlante Naucalpan in the Second division of promotion in the Clausura tournament 2005. In 2006, FIFA took over the management of the beach soccer world cup. In the 2005 Americas Beach Soccer Tournament had Mexico lost against Brazil, 3-23. Jorge Campos and Ramón Raya were invited to participate in the project, reason why Raya managed to qualify Mexico for the first time to a world cup of the specialty and to be world runner-up in 2007. He was named the best coach of the FIFA Beach Soccer World Cup 2007 and is a FIFA beach soccer instructor since 2009. He was named the futsal Mexico national team coach and he managed to qualify the team for their inaugural FIFA world cup in Thailand in 2012. He has managed six FIFA World Cups teams to date: Rio de Janeiro 2007, Marseille 2008, Ravenna 2010, Portugal 2015 and Bahamas 2017 in beach soccer and Thailand 2012 in futsal. Since December 2020 he returned to soccer and currently is the coach of the Denton Diablos in the NPSL. Since his arrival he has won the La Roja League winter edition championship and also won the 2021 NPSL National Championship in his first season as the head coach. He was named best coach in the lone star conference and best coach in the South Region.

== Clubs ==
As a player

Country Country Year
Tampico-Madero Flag of Mexico.svg Mexico 1985 - 1986
Club National University Flag of Mexico.svg Mexico 1986 - 1990
Querétaro FC Flag of Mexico.svg Mexico 1990 - 1991
Bulls of the UTN Flag of Mexico.svg Mexico 1991 - 1992
Club Deportivo Marte Flag of Mexico.svg Mexico 1995 - 1996
Hawaii Tsunami Flag of the United States.svg United States 1996

Participations in World Cups

As a player

Headquarters Tournament Result
1985 FIFA U-16 World Cup Flag of the People's Republic of China China First Stage

Beach soccer

World Headquarters Result
FIFA Beach Soccer World Cup 2007 Brazil Flag Brazil Sub-champion
FIFA Beach Soccer World Cup 2008 Flag of France France Group stage?
FIFA Beach Soccer World Cup 2011 Flag of Italy Italy Quarterfinals
FIFA Beach Soccer World Cup 2015 Portugal Flag Portugal Group Stage
FIFA Beach Soccer World Cup 2017 Flag of the Bahamas Bahamas Group Stage
Futsal
World Headquarters Result
FIFA Futsal World Championship 2012 Flag of Thailand Thailand Group stage
History
Runner-up of the FIFA Beach Soccer World Cup 2007.
Concacaf Beach Soccer Championship (3): 2008, 2010, 2015.
Official Beach Soccer Championship of Chile (1): 2010.
Suderland International Beach Soccer Cup (1): 2010.
Viña del Mar tournament champion 2015.

Champion Visit Puerto Vallarta cup 2017.

Bahamas cup winner 2018
