= Dunaszeg =

- Flag Coat of arms

- Location of Győr-Moson-Sopron county in Hungary

- Location of Dunaszeg
- Coordinates: 47.76839°N 17.54141°E
- Country: Hungary
- County: Győr-Moson-Sopron

Area
  - Total: 17.26 km^{2} (6.66 sq mi)

Population (2025)
  - Total: 2,324
  - Density: 101.79/km^{2} (263.6/sq mi)
- Time zone: UTC+1 (CET)
  - Summer (DST): UTC+2 (CEST)
- Postal code: 9174
- Area code: 96

Dunaszeg is a village in Győr-Moson-Sopron county, located in western Hungary. There are 2,324 inhabitants (as of 2025). With a population density of roughly 951 persons per square kilometer, the community has an area of roughly 1.5 square kilometers.

For outdoor enthusiasts, Dunaszeg offers the "Dunaszeg – Győr" trail, a 13.7 km point-to-point route popular for hiking and biking. This trail provides scenic views of the Szigetköz region and is suitable for various skill levels.
