= Larry McPhail =

American soccer player

Personal information
- Full name: Larry Lee McPhail Jr.
- Date of birth: August 27, 1968 (age 58)
- Place of birth: Englewood, Colorado, U.S.
- Height: 6 ft 2 in (1.88 m)
- Position: Forward

Youth career
- 1986–1989: SMU Mustangs

Senior career*
| Years | Team | Apps | (Gls) |
| 1989–1990 | Richardson Rockets (indoor) | | |
| 1990 | Colorado Foxes | | |

International career
- U.S. U-17
- * Club domestic league appearances and goals

Larry McPhail (born August 27, 1968) is an American retired soccer forward who played one season each in the American Professional Soccer League and SISL.

McPhail was a member of the United States U-17 men's national soccer team at the 1985 FIFA U-16 World Championship. He played all three games as the U.S. went 1-2-0 in group play. He was a 1986 Parade Magazine High School All American soccer player. That year, he entered Southern Methodist University where he played on the men's soccer team from 1986 to 1989. He was a 1987 and 1989 Third Team All American at SMU. In the fall of 1989, McPhail signed with the Richardson Rockets of the Southwest Independent Soccer League. In 1990, McPhail played for the Colorado Foxes in the American Professional Soccer League.
