= Arroio do Meio =

Municipality of Rio Grande do Sul, Brazil

- Municipality
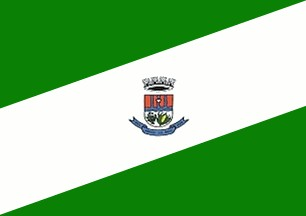
- Flag Coat of arms

- Location within Rio Grande do Sul

- Location in Brazil
- Coordinates: 29°24′03″S 51°56′42″W
- Country: Brazil
- State: Rio Grande do Sul
- Mesoregion: Centro Oriental Rio-grandense
- Microregion: Lajeado-Estrela
- Settled: 1853
- Founded: November 28, 1934

Government
  - Mayor: Danilo Bruxel (Progressistas)

Area
  - Total: 157.955 km^{2} (60.987 sq mi)
- Elevation: 54 m (177 ft)

Population (2022)
  - Total: 21,958
  - Density: 139.01/km^{2} (360.05/sq mi)
- Time zone: UTC−3 (BRT)
- Area/distance code: 95940-000
- HDI: 0.769
- GDP: R$ 405,662,000
- GDP per capita: R$59.080,01
- Website: www.arroiodomeiors.com.br

Arroio do Meio is a municipality in the state of Rio Grande do Sul, Brazil. It is 98 km from Porto Alegre. It is on the banks of the Taquari River.

The territory was little populated before the arrival of Europeans. Settlement in the territory began in 1853, principally by Germans and Portuguese. The territory used to be part of Lajeado and Encantado municipalities.

== See also ==
- List of municipalities in Rio Grande do Sul
