= Abdoul Karim Bangoura =

Guinean footballer (born 1971)

Personal information
- Date of birth: 9 February 1971 (age 55)
- Place of birth: Conakry, Guinea
- Height: 1.77 m (5 ft 10 in)
- Position: Defender

Senior career*
Years	Team	Apps	(Gls)
1988–1989	Bastia	2	(0)
1989–1994	Bastia B	76	(4)
1994–1996	FC Martigues	15	(0)
1994–1996	FC Martigues B	29	(3)
1997–1998	Amiens B		
Total		122	(7)

International career
1988–1999	Guinea	32	(1)
- * Club domestic league appearances and goals

Abdoul Karim Bangoura (born 9 February 1971) is a Guinean former professional footballer who played as a defender. He was a squad member at the 1994 and 1998 Africa Cup of Nations.
