= Tu Shengqiao =

Chinese footballer

Tu Shengqiao 涂胜桥
Personal information
- Full name: Tu Shengqiao
- Date of birth: 9 November 1968 (age 57)
- Place of birth: Wuhan, Hubei, China
- Height: 1.69 m (5 ft 6 1/2 in)
- Positions: Midfielder; defender

Youth career
- 1985–1989: China B

Senior career*
Years	Team	Apps	(Gls)
1990–1995	Hubei WISCO		
1996	Qianwei Huandao		
1998	Guangzhou Matsunichi		

International career
1988	China	4	(0)
- * Club domestic league appearances and goals

Tu Shengqiao (Chinese: 涂胜桥; born 9 November 1968) is a former Chinese international football midfielder who played for Hubei WISCO, Qianwei Huandao and Guangzhou Matsunichi while also representing China in the 1988 Asian Cup.

== Playing career ==
Tu Shengqiao was considered a talented youngster and was soon part of the Chinese U-23 team that was called China B and who were allowed to take part in the Chinese football league pyramid. His time with them was extremely successful and he was even able to win the Chinese league title with them in the 1989 league season. His time at the China B team also saw him called up to the senior team, where he took part in the 1988 Asian Cup and aided China to a fourth-place finish. He eventually returned to his hometown of Wuhan to play for Hubei WISCO before joining Qianwei Huandao where he won the second-tier division with them in the 1996 league campaign before ending his career with Guangzhou Matsunichi.

== Career statistics ==
=== International statistics ===
Year	Competition	Apps	Goal
1988	Asian Cup	4	0
Total		4	0

== Honours ==
China B

- Chinese Jia-A League: 1989

Qianwei Huandao

- Chinese Jia-B League: 1996
