= William (footballer, born 1968) =

Brazilian footballer

Personal information
- Full name: William César de Oliveira
- Date of birth: 17 October 1968 (age 57)
- Place of birth: Cuiabá, Mato Grosso, Brazil
- Height: 1.66 m (5 ft 5 in)
- Position: Midfielder

Senior career*
Years	Team	Apps	(Gls)
1986–1994	Vasco		
1995–1996	Flamengo		
1995	Clube Atlético Mineiro		
1995	Fluminense FC		
1995	Guarani		
1998	América de Cali		
2002	Alianza Lima		
2002	Americano		
- * Club domestic league appearances and goals

William César de Oliveira (born 17 October 1968) is a Brazilian former international footballer. He has played for several domestic club teams in Brazil such as Vasco Esporte Clube, Flamengo, Fluminense FC, Clube Atlético Mineiro etc.

William was part of the Brazilian U17 football team at the inaugural edition of the FIFA U-16 World Championship (now known as FIFA U17 World Cup) in 1985. He played a vital role in Brazil's third-place finish at the first edition of the Youth FIFA World Cup with scoring 5 goals in the entire tournament. He was awarded the Golden Ball at the 1985 World Cup as he was the second leading goal scorer in the tournament just behind Marcel Witeczek of Germany.
