= Supercopa do Brasil =

- Official logo
- Organiser(s): Brazilian Football Confederation
- Founded: 1990; 36 years ago
- Region: Brazil
- Teams: 2
- Current champions: Corinthians (2nd title)
- Most championships: Flamengo (3 titles)
- Website: cbf.com.br
- 2026 Supercopa do Brasil

The Supercopa do Brasil (Brazilian Portuguese pronunciation: [su.peɾˈkɔ.pɐ du bɾaˈziw], English: Brazil's Super Cup), officially named Supercopa Rei since 2024 (Brazilian Portuguese pronunciation: [su.peɾˈkɔ.pɐ ˈʁej], English: King Super Cup), is a Brazilian association football trophy organized by the Brazilian Football Confederation (CBF). It is contested between the champions of the Campeonato Brasileiro and the winners of the Copa do Brasil. If the same club wins Campeonato Brasileiro and Copa do Brasil, their opponent will be the Campeonato Brasileiro runner-up.

The Brazilian Football Confederation announced in 2013 a new edition of the competition was expected to be played in 2015. The revival would only take place in 2020. In honor of O Rei Pelé, who died in 2022, the Supercopa do Brasil was renamed the Supercopa Rei on 31 January 2024.

== Results ==
List of Supercopa do Brasil matches
Year	Winners	Score	Runners-up	Venue	Attendance
1990	Grêmio	2–0	Vasco da Gama	Olímpico Monumental, Porto Alegre	34,461
1990	Grêmio	0–0	Vasco da Gama	São Januário, Rio de Janeiro	2,932
1991	Corinthians	1–0	Flamengo	Morumbi, São Paulo	2,706
Tournament was not held between 1992 and 2019.
2020	Flamengo	3–0	Athletico Paranaense	Mané Garrincha, Brasília	48,009
2021	Flamengo	2–2 (6–5 p)	Palmeiras	Mané Garrincha, Brasília	0
2022	Atlético Mineiro	2–2 (8–7 p)	Flamengo	Arena Pantanal, Cuiabá	32,028
2023	Palmeiras	4–3	Flamengo	Mané Garrincha, Brasília	67,422
2024	São Paulo	0–0 (4–2 p)	Palmeiras	Mineirão, Belo Horizonte	42,741
2025	Flamengo	3–1	Botafogo	Mangueirão, Belém	44,952
2026	Corinthians	2–0	Flamengo	Mané Garrincha, Brasília	71,244

=== Titles by club ===
Team	Won	Lost	Years won	Years lost
Flamengo	3	4	2020, 2021, 2025	1991, 2022, 2023, 2026
Corinthians	2	0	1991, 2026	—
Palmeiras	1	2	2023	2021, 2024
Grêmio	1	0	1990	—
Atlético Mineiro	1	0	2022	—
São Paulo	1	0	2024	—
Vasco da Gama	0	1	—	1990
Athletico Paranaense	0	1	—	2020
Botafogo	0	1	—	2025

== Unofficial competitions ==
=== 1992 ===
An unofficial competition was played in 1992, between the champions of the Série A and of the Série B, as both championships were played in the first six months of the year. The game was played on 12 August between Flamengo (champion of the Série A) and Paraná (champion of the Série B). The game ended in a 2–2 draw, and in the penalty shootout, Flamengo beat the opponent 4–3. While RSSSF regards the competition as some form of Supercopa do Brasil, although officially not regards as Supercopa do Brasil, in Brazil the competition was popularly known as Taça Brahma dos Campeões. Differently from the 1990 and 1991 editions, which were official CBF competitions, the 1992 edition was a friendly cup.

=== 2018 ===
In 2018, Corinthians, champion of 2017 Campeonato Brasileiro Série A and Cruzeiro, champion of 2017 Copa do Brasil, played two friendly matches during the period corresponding to the 2018 FIFA World Cup to determine the unofficial Super Cup winner. The first game, played at Mineirão on July 4 ended with a 2–0 win for Corinthians, while the return game, played on July 11 at the Arena Corinthians, ended in a 2–2 draw. Two years later, the competition officially returned.

== Records and statistics ==
=== All-time top scorers ===
Rank	Player	Club	Goals
1	(Brazil) Gabriel Barbosa	Flamengo	5
2	(Brazil) Raphael Veiga	Palmeiras	4
2	(Brazil) Bruno Henrique	Flamengo	4
3	(Uruguay) Giorgian de Arrascaeta	Flamengo	2
3	(Brazil) Gabriel Menino	Palmeiras	2

=== Winning managers ===
Year	Manager (Note: Osmar Loss was the winning manager for Corinthians in the 2018 unsactioned competition)	Club
1990	(Brazil) Paulo Sérgio Poletto (1st leg) (Brazil) Evaristo de Macedo (2nd leg)	Grêmio
1991	(Brazil) Nelsinho Baptista	Corinthians
2020	(Portugal) Jorge Jesus	Flamengo
2021	(Brazil) Rogério Ceni	Flamengo
2022	(Argentina) Antonio Mohamed	Atlético Mineiro
2023	(Portugal) Abel Ferreira	Palmeiras
2024	(Brazil) Thiago Carpini	São Paulo
2025	(Brazil) Filipe Luís	Flamengo
2026	(Brazil) Dorival Júnior	Corinthians

=== Winning captains ===
Year	Captain (Note: Goalkeeper Cássio was the winning captain for Corinthians in the 2018 unsactioned competition)	Club
1990	(Brazil) Jandir Bugs	Grêmio
1991	(Brazil) Neto	Corinthians
2020	(Brazil) Everton Ribeiro	Flamengo
2021	(Brazil) Diego	Flamengo
2022	(Brazil) Hulk	Atlético Mineiro
2023	(Paraguay) Gustavo Gómez	Palmeiras
2024	(Brazil) Rafinha	São Paulo
2025	(Brazil) Gerson	Flamengo
2026	(Brazil) Gustavo Henrique	Corinthians
