= 1989 Copa do Brasil =

Copa do Brasil 1989

Tournament details
- Country: Brazil
- Dates: July 19 – September 2
- Teams: 32

Final positions
- Champions: Grêmio (RS)
- Runners-up: Sport (PE)

Tournament statistics
- Matches played: 61
- Goals scored: 137 (2.25 per match)
- Top goal scorer: Gérson da Silva (7)

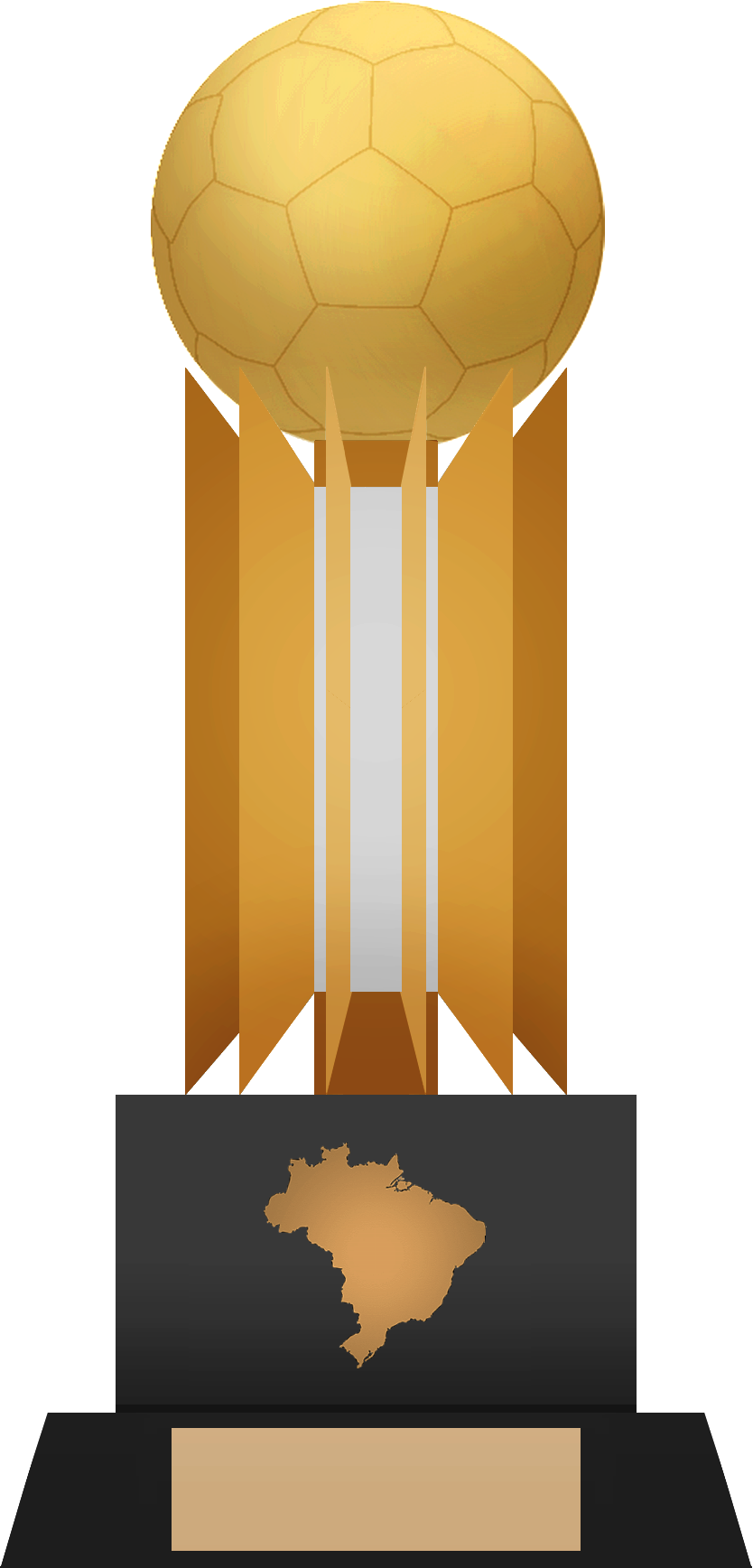
Trophy from Copa do Brasil 1989

The Copa do Brasil 1989 was the 1st staging of the Copa do Brasil.

The competition started on July 19, 1989, and concluded on September 2, 1989, with the second leg of the final, held at the Estádio Olímpico Monumental in Porto Alegre, in which Grêmio lifted the trophy for the first time with a 2–1 victory over Sport Recife.

Gérson, of Atlético Mineiro, with seven goals, was the competition's topscorer.

== Format ==
The competition was disputed by 32 clubs in a knock-out format where all rounds were played in two legs and the away goals rule was used.

== Participating teams ==
- América (RN)
- Atlético (GO)
- Atlético (MG)
- Atlético (PR)
- Avaí (SC)
- Bahia (BA)
- Blumenau (SC)
- Botafogo (PB)

- Confiança (SE)
- Corinthians (SP)
- Cruzeiro (MG)
- CSA (AL)
- Ferroviário (CE)
- Flamengo (PI)
- Flamengo (RJ)
- Fortaleza (CE)

- Goiás (GO)
- Grêmio (RS)
- Guarani (SP)
- Ibiraçu (ES)
- Internacional (RS)
- Mixto (MT)
- Náutico (PE)
- Operário (MS)

- Paysandu (PA)
- Pinheiros (PR)
- Rio Negro (AM)
- Sampaio Corrêa (MA)
- Sport (PE)
- Tiradentes (DF)
- Vasco (RJ)'
- Vitória (BA)

== Competition stages ==
1st Round
1	Rio Negro (AM)	1 1
32	Vasco (RJ)	1 2
17	Vitória (BA)	2 0
16	Avaí (SC)	0 1
9	Guarani (SP)	3 1
24	Flamengo (PI)	1 1
25	Fortaleza (CE)	0 0
8	Sport (PE)	0 1
5	América (RN)	0 0
28	Atlético (MG)	3 7
21	Náutico (PE)	1 0
12	Atlético (PR)	0 0
13	Internacional (RS)	0 2
20	CSA (AL)	0 0
29	Goiás (GO)	1 3
4	Ferroviário (CE)	0 1
3	Flamengo (RJ)	2 0
30	Paysandu (PA)	2 1
19	Blumenau (SC)	1 1
14	Operário (MS)	1 0
11	Sampaio Corrêa (MA)	3 0
22	Corinthians (SP)	2 1
27	Tiradentes (DF)	1 0
6	Atlético (GO)	0 0
7	Ibiraçu (ES)	0 0
26	Grêmio (RS)	1 6
23	Pinheiros (PR)	0 1
10	Mixto (MT)	1 2
15	Cruzeiro (MG)	0 1
18	Botafogo (PB)	0 1
31	Confiança (SE)	0 0
2	Bahia (BA)	1 1

2nd Round
Vasco (RJ)	0 1
Vitória (BA)	0 2
Guarani (SP)	1 0
Sport (PE)	1 1
Atlético (MG)	1 3
Náutico (PE)	1 0
Internacional (RS)	0 0
Goiás (GO)	0 4
Flamengo (RJ)	3 3
Blumenau	1 1
Corinthians (SP)	5 0
Tiradentes (DF)	0 1
Grêmio (RS)	5 1
Mixto (MT)	0 (WO)
Cruzeiro (MG)	1 0
Bahia (BA)	0 2

Quarterfinals
Vitória (BA)	1 0
Sport (PE)	0 2
Goiás (GO)	3 0
Atlético (MG)	0 2
Flamengo (RJ)	2 2
Corinthians (SP)	0 4
Grêmio (RS)	1 2
Bahia (BA)	0 0

Semifinals
Goiás (GO)	2 0
Sport (PE)	1 1
Flamengo (RJ)	2 1
Grêmio (RS)	2 6

Finals
Sport (PE)	0 1
Grêmio (RS)	0 2

Copa do Brasil
1989 Winners
Grêmio
First Title
