= Agostina Mileo =

Argentine science communicator, environmentalist

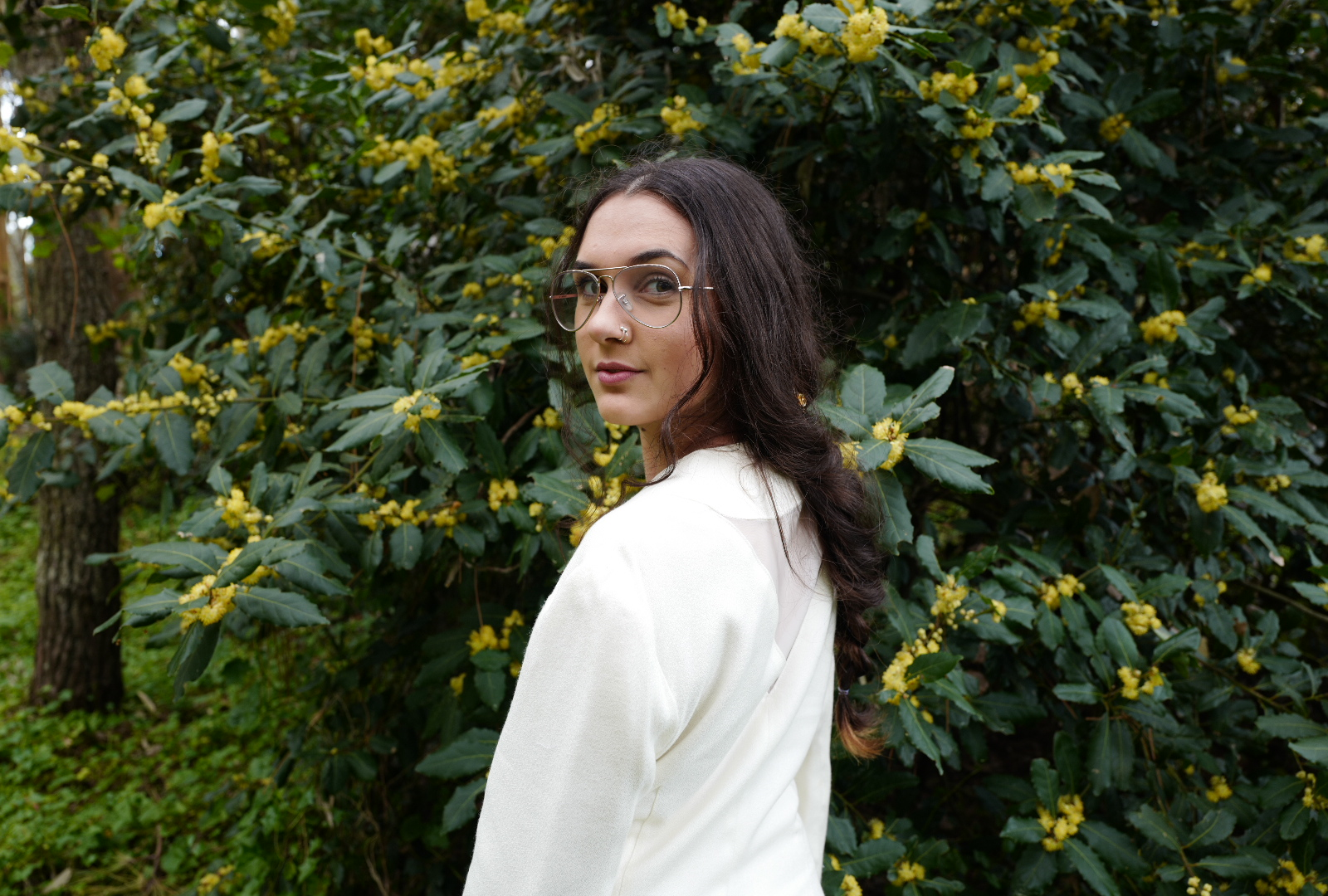
- Born: 18 September 1987 (age 39); Buenos Aires, Argentina
- Education: BSc Environmental sciences, MSc Science communication
- Alma mater: National University of Tres de Febrero, Pompeu Fabra University
- Occupations: Writer, science communicator, environmentalist
- Awards: Lola Mora Award

Agostina Mileo (Buenos Aires, Argentina, 18 September 1987) is an Argentine environmentalist, science communicator, and writer. Through her alter ego Scientist Barbie, she analyzes how the gender gap in science affects the production of knowledge. Mileo is the author of the popular science book "Let Science accompany you (to fight for your rights)". She is part of the group Economía Feminista where she leads the MenstruAction campaign that seeks, among other things, to make visible how menstruation is a factor of inequality for women.

== Career ==
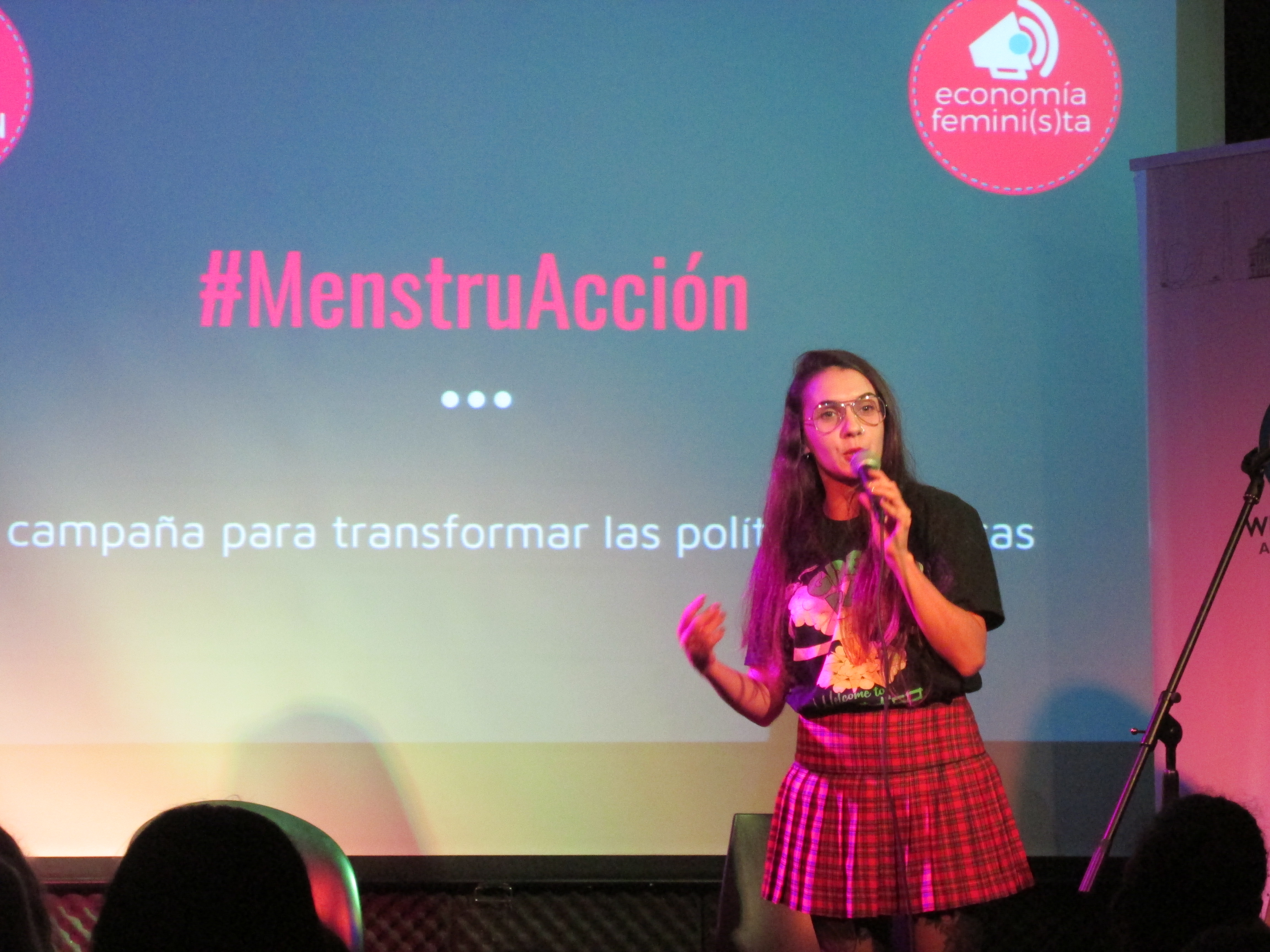
Agostina Mileo giving a talk at the conference "Barra Libre sobre Género y Divulgación Científica"

Mileo has a degree in Environmental sciences and a master's degree in Scientific communication. She is currently a doctoral student in History and Epistemology of Science at the National University of Tres de Febrero in Argentina.

She developed much of her work through her alter ego as the Scientist Barbie. Mileo has been described as "the Argentine that is all the rage among Millennials" for her work in the development of scientific dissemination strategies and her impact on young people. Scientist Barbie was born as a communication resource with the objective of confronting prejudices, gender bias and promoting the desacralization of science. In this sense, Mileo seeks to meet an existing demand from people who are interested in science without having it studied.

Mileo is part of the Economía Feminista collective where she coordinates the MenstruAcción campaign that seeks to end the stigma of the menstrual period, guarantee the free provision of menstrual products and raise awareness of the impact on the fundamental rights of women. Currently, eleven bills have been presented in the framework of the campaign, both at the national level and in different Argentine provinces.

Between September 2020 and November 2022, Mileo wrote the newsletter "Que la ciencia te acompañe" ("May science be with you") — same title as her book —, published every Monday and corresponding to the "Science, knowledge and dissemination" section (later called "Science and technology") of the digital media outlet Cenital.

She published with Indielibros "Maternal Instinct. Since when is childbirth a destiny?", an essay in which she reviews how throughout history a relationship between Motherhood and being a woman was established and denatures the idea that having and caring for children justifies any sacrifice, without the possibility of questioning it. Mileo made "the Noticiencia", a series of thirty short videos about scientific communication with a gender perspective for El Canciller and published The Steps of Aquiles on the scientific culture site of the National University of General Sarmiento. Since 2024, she hosts Noticias de ayer, a program about philosophy and contemporary events, with Natalí Incaminato and Danila Suárez Tomé on the YouTube channel Posdata.

== Awards ==
As part of Mileo's work in Economía Feminista, they received the Lola Mora Awards in 2016 for best digital medium awarded, by the General Directorate for Women and promoted by the legislature of the Autonomous City of Buenos Aires.
