= Estádio Beira-Rio =

Football stadium in Porto Alegre, Brazil

Estádio José Pinheiro Borda
- Beira-Rio, Gigante da Beira-Rio
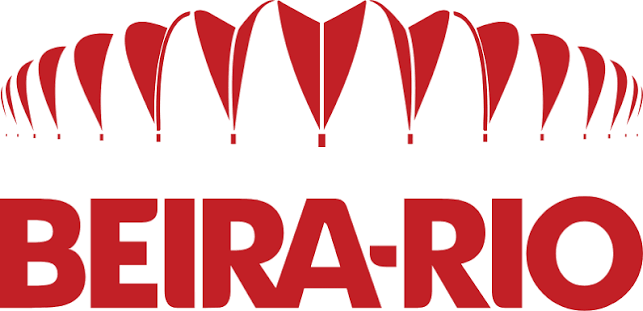

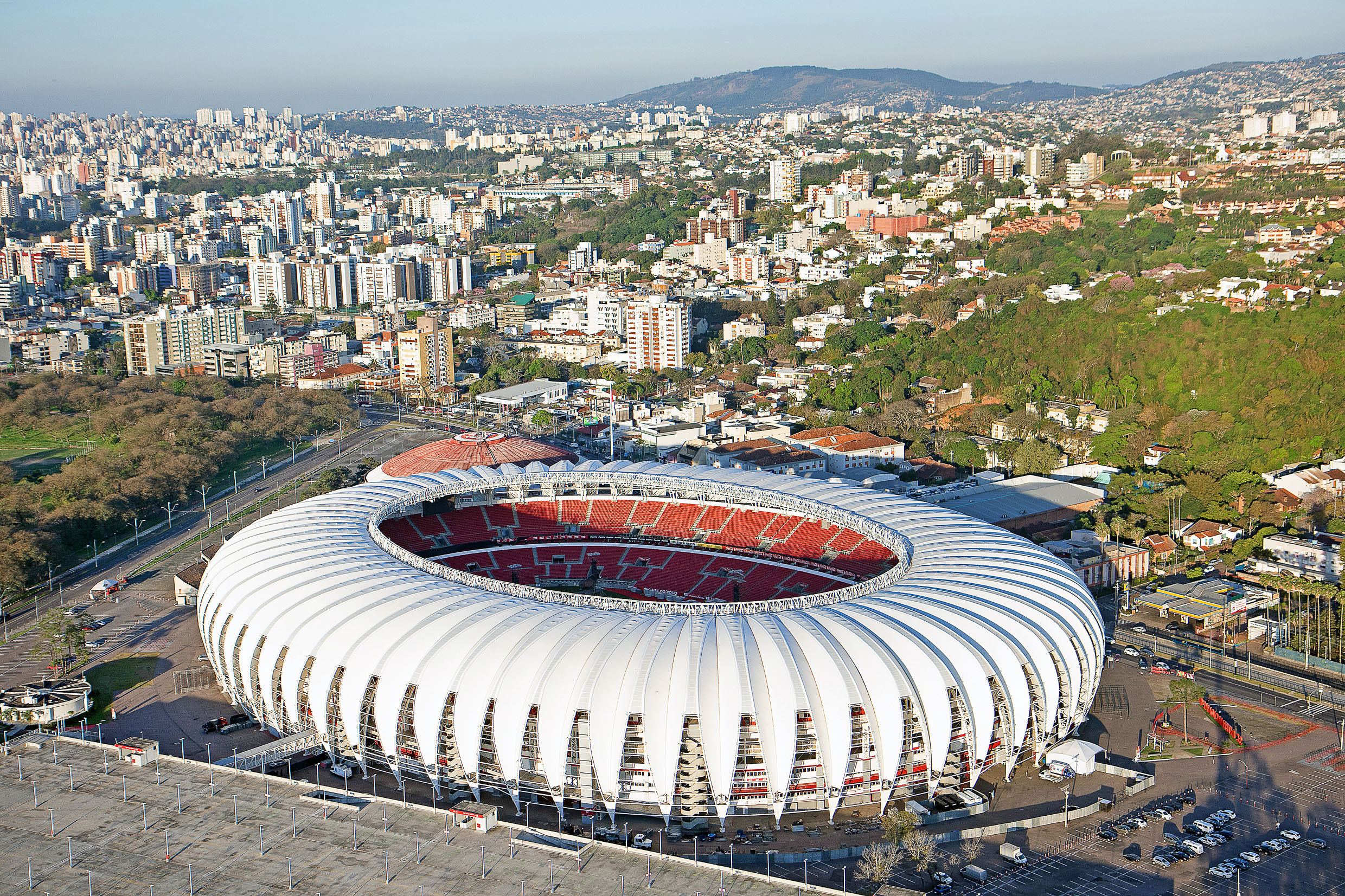
- Sisbrace
- Interactive map of Estádio José Pinheiro Borda
- Full name: Estádio José Pinheiro Borda
- Location: Av. Padre Cacique, 621-1571, Praia de Belas, Porto Alegre, Rio Grande do Sul, Brazil
- Coordinates: 30°3′56″S 51°14′10″W
- Owner: Sport Club Internacional
- Operator: SPE Holding Beira-Rio S/A
- Capacity: 50,848
- Surface: TifGrand
- Record attendance: 106,554
- Field size: 105 m × 68 m (344 ft × 223 ft)

Construction
- Groundbreaking: September 12, 1956
- Opened: April 6, 1969
- Renovated: Autumn 2013
- Cost: R$ 330 million (renovation)
- Architect: Hype Studio

Tenants
- Internacional (1969–2012, 2014–present); Brazil national football team (selected matches)

Estádio José Pinheiro Borda, better known as Estádio Beira-Rio (Brazilian Portuguese pronunciation: [esˈtadʒi.u ˈbejɾɐ ˈʁi.u]; "Riverside Stadium"), Gigante da Beira-Rio or simply Beira-Rio, due to its location beside the Guaíba River, is a football stadium in Porto Alegre, Rio Grande do Sul, Brazil. It serves as the home stadium for Sport Club Internacional, replacing their previous stadium, the Estádio dos Eucaliptos. It is named after José Pinheiro Borda (1897–1965), an elderly Portuguese engineer who supervised the building of the stadium but died before seeing its completion.

Estádio Beira-Rio was one of the 12 venues used for the 2014 FIFA World Cup, hosting five of the matches in the tournament.

== General information ==
- Grass: TifGrand
- Box offices: 4, with 68 booths
- Toilets: 81
- Capacity 50,128 (7,500 VIP seats)
- Executive suites 125 (70 suites + 55 skyboxes)
- Video screens 2 (100 m^{2} (1,100 sq ft) each)
- Parking 5,500
- Record Attendance 106,554 (Rio Grande do Sul All-Stars 3–3 Brazil national football team, on June 17, 1972)

== History ==
=== Construction ===
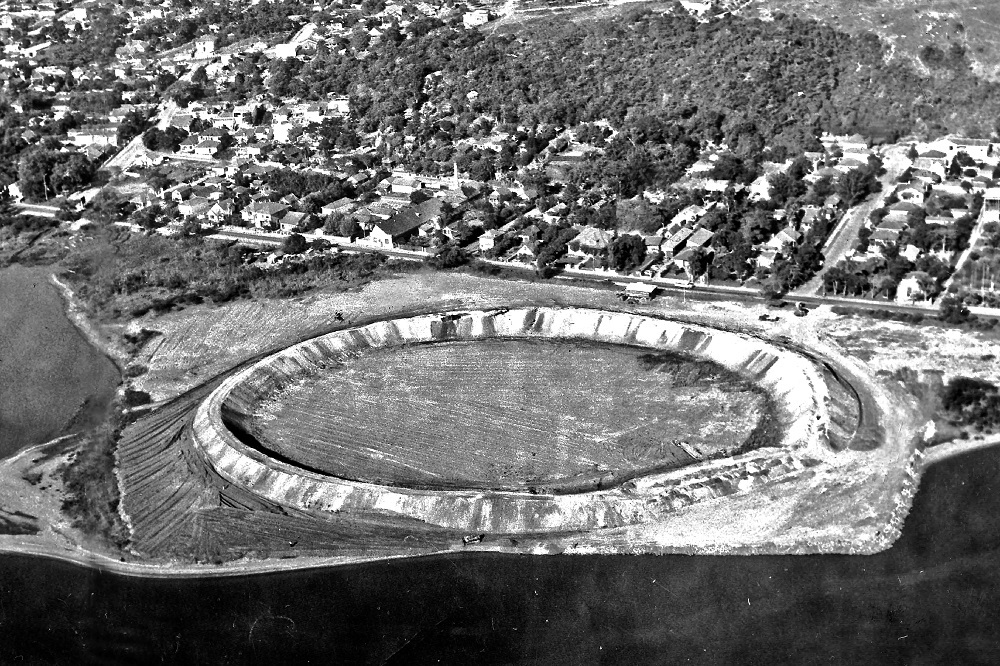
Land fill for the Beira-Rio construction

On September 12, 1956, Ephraim Pinheiro Cabral—a former president of Sport Club Internacional (or simply 'Internacional' for short) from 1951 to 1952—proposed a project in the Porto Alegre City Council to donate an eight-hectare plot of land to the Clube do Povo for the construction of a new stadium. The only complication was that the land was situated within the Rio Guaíba. Hence, if the proposal were to be approved, filling the area would be necessary before commencing construction.

The landfill started to become a reality in late 1957 with the arrival of the 'Ster' dredger. Nevertheless, there were times when the construction lagged behind. At the time, many skeptics joked that he was actually buying a 'Floating Seat', with these critiques being depicted in newspaper cartoons. The early 1960s marked the beginning of positive developments for the landfill taking shape over the Guaíba. Led by José Pinheiro Borda, who would later have the stadium officially named after him, a Portuguese immigrant who arrived in Porto Alegre in 1929. A Works Commission was established soon after.

Beside Borda on the committee were Ephraim, serving as vice-president; Manoel Tavares, Eraldo Hermann, and José Asmus, overseeing purchase of materials; Arno Larsen, Paulo Reginato, and Jader de Souza, handling treasury matters; Aldo Dias Rosa and Hugo Martins Martinez, managing accounting tasks; alongside Rui Tedesco and Thompson Flores, focusing on the technical aspects of the project. The team facilitated progress at the so-called Gigante, collaborating with the municipality to acquire new machinery for efficiency. Additionally, they emphasized the importance of fan support as a significant factor in advancing the stadium's construction efforts.

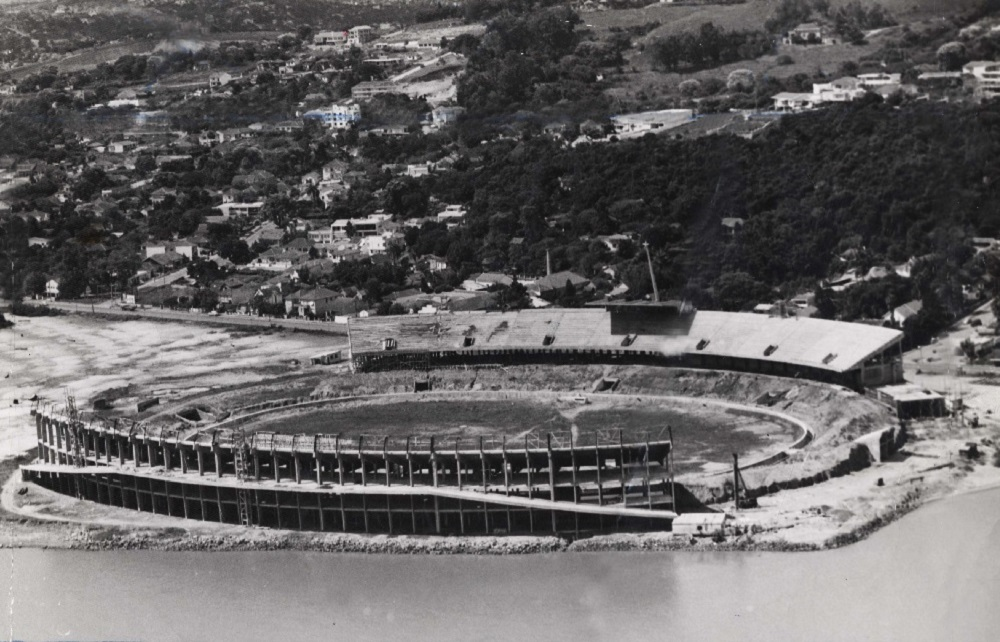
Construction of Beira-Rio in the Guaíba Lake in the 1960s

Radio campaigns began urging both male and female supporters from all over Rio Grande to donate materials such as bricks, cement, and iron. In an effort to boost enthusiasm among fans, a scale model of the new stadium, representing its still early stages of development, was unveiled to the public during a ceremony organized on October 6, 1962. In that same year, the cornerstone of the stadium was laid, which was followed by the construction of its tunnels and grandstand structures. The intense pace further excited the fans, boosting the sales of fundraising bonds for the construction. After reaching two thousand in the first year of donations, they quickly reached the mark of forty thousand. The support was so significant that, at one point, in an interview with Zero Hora, Borda admitted to not fully grasping the dimensions of the club he was leading.

Apart from simply looking forward to the new stadium, fans had also hoped that their team's performance on the field would improve with the inauguration of the stadium. After enjoying considerable success in the 1940s and 1950s, the club had recently experienced a downturn, with only one state championship victory in 1961. Disheartened by the team's losses at the old Eucaliptos stadium, supporters would visit the construction site of the future stadium to find solace.

In 1965, due to the Internacional's weakened finances, construction works of the Beira-Rio had to be halted. The works were only resumed following financial assistance from the Banco da Província, secured through the Works Committee.

On April 25, 1965, José Pinheiro Borda, who was still leading the efforts of the construction, died. This was shortly after expressing in an interview his ongoing prayer to witness the completion of the Gigante da Beira-Rio. His death prompted a movement among Porto Alegre's inhabitants to name the stadium after him in his honor.

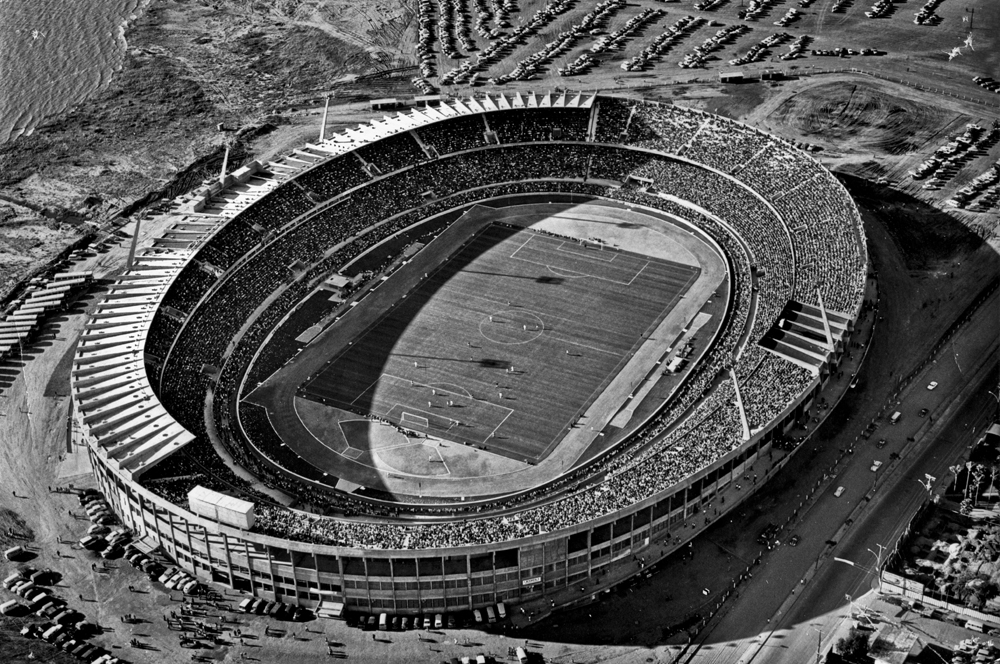
Aerial view of the Beira-Rio stadium in the 1960s.

In 1967, the appeal for donations intensified with the launching of the Brick Campaign on November 26 during a match between Inter and Farroupilha at the Eucaliptos stadium. In addition to the presence of the players from the current squad, who took to the field with a banner urging the fans to make donations, club legends like Tesourinha and Carlitos strongly expressed their support in the appeal.

In 1968, the stadium was mostly complete. It incorporated architectural features inspired by the Tokyo Olympic Stadium and the Azteca Stadium in Mexico City. The Gigante underwent its first major tests. In March 1968, for example, the stadium hosted the final of the 10th Gaúcho Beach Soccer Championship between Cidreira and a selection of other participating teams. Fifteen thousand people attended the event.

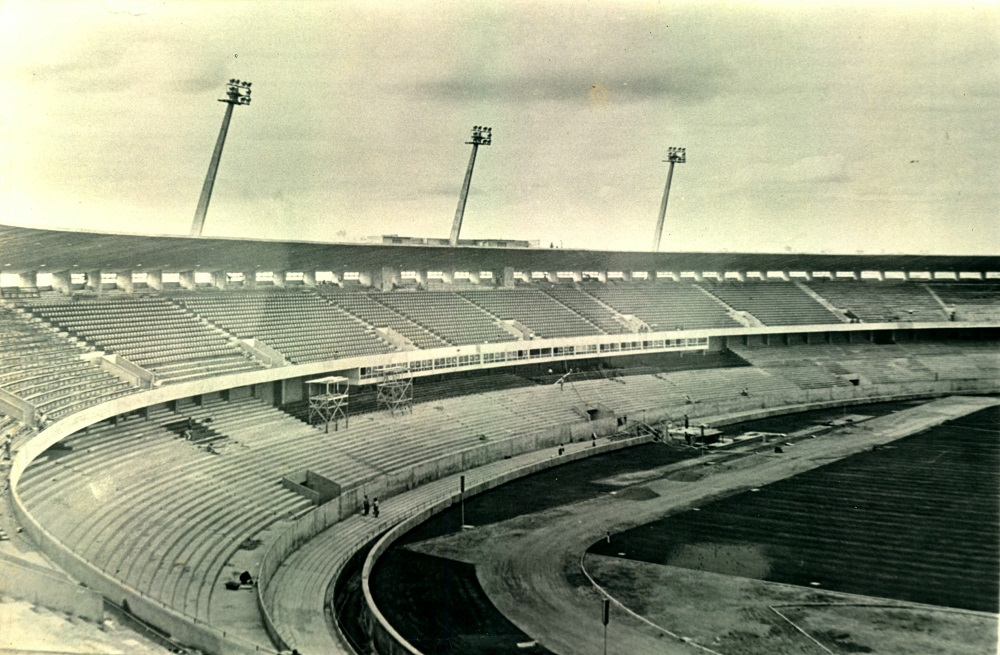
Beira-Rio stands in the 1960s

In 1969, the Gigante was ready to welcome over 100 thousand people on Sunday, April 6. The Beira-Rio drew attention for both its appearance and the modernity of its facilities. In total, there were 28 press booths, four of which were allocated for TV, another four for print media, and the rest for radio stations. The sector could be accessed either through luxury elevators, which also led to the stands, or through staircases exclusive to media professionals.

The new Colorado stadium was equipped with Telex, a system that transmitted information to London and Lisbon on the day of the inauguration. Athletes were able to take thermal baths in the locker rooms, which was rare in fields internationally. Fans could follow match updates on the large electronic scoreboard behind the south goal of the Beira-Rio.

=== Inauguration ===
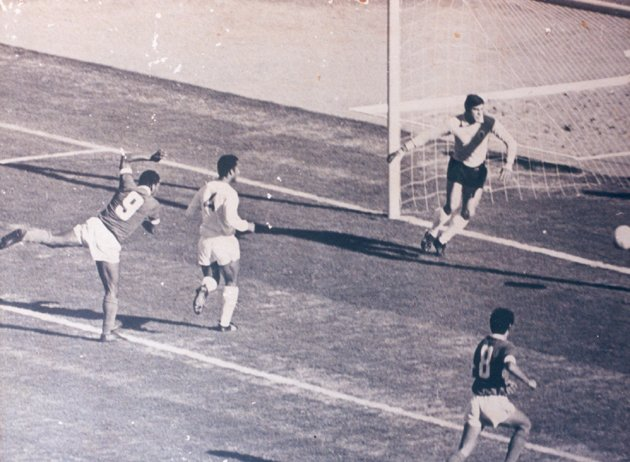
Claudiomiro scores the first goal for Internacional at Beira-Rio stadium against Benfica.

On Easter Sunday, April 6, 1969 (after 13 years of construction), the Beira-Rio was officially opened. It was considered the most magnificent and opulent stadium in Brazil at the time. On that morning, all attention in the capital of Rio Grande do Sul focused on the Gigante, as the city adorned itself in red, whether through flags, pieces of red fabric, or the presence of red on cars and pedestrians.

The club urged fans to ignite fireworks at dawn in an event dubbed the "Red Dawn" or "Red Awakening". Despite the event being planned for 7 am, the first explosions went off before 6 am.

A crowd of approximately 100 thousand people went to the stadium to watch the festival of performances, the largest public turnout of any stadium in Rio Grande do Sul in history at the time. In the same place where the cornerstone was celebrated in 1963, Bishop Edmundo Kunz blessed the stadium. On the field, at around 1:30 pm, the Military Band of the 18th Infantry Regiment of São Leopoldo played the national anthem, accompanying Governor Walter Peracchi de Barcelos. Following this, officials escorted engineer Ruy Tedesco, head of the construction committee, to the field's center. Surrounded by his peers, he ceremonially cut the symbolic ribbon to mark the stadium's inauguration.

For the first game, Internacional invited Benfica to face their Colorado team in the inaugural match at the Beira-Rio. They had been champions twice in Europe and finalists five times during the decade, and were the current champions of the Portuguese championship at the time. Their team had also included prominent player Eusébio. In contrast to Benfica's accolades, the Colarado team ended up winning the match. With excitement, Valdomiro made a run down the right flank and delivered a cross at the 24th minute. Gilson Porto, positioned on the left side of Benfica's penalty area, struck the ball first-time back into the mix. There, Claudiomiro, 19 years old at the time, headed the ball into the net from between the defenders, scoring 1–0, which drew loud cheers from the crowd.

In the second half, Eusébio scored the equalizer at the 23rd minute, capitalizing on a refereeing mistake where a free kick, initially signaled for two touches, was converted with just one. Less than five minutes later, Gilson Porto, beat goalkeeper José Henrique from another set-piece, achieving the match's final score.

=== Significant games won by Internacional ===
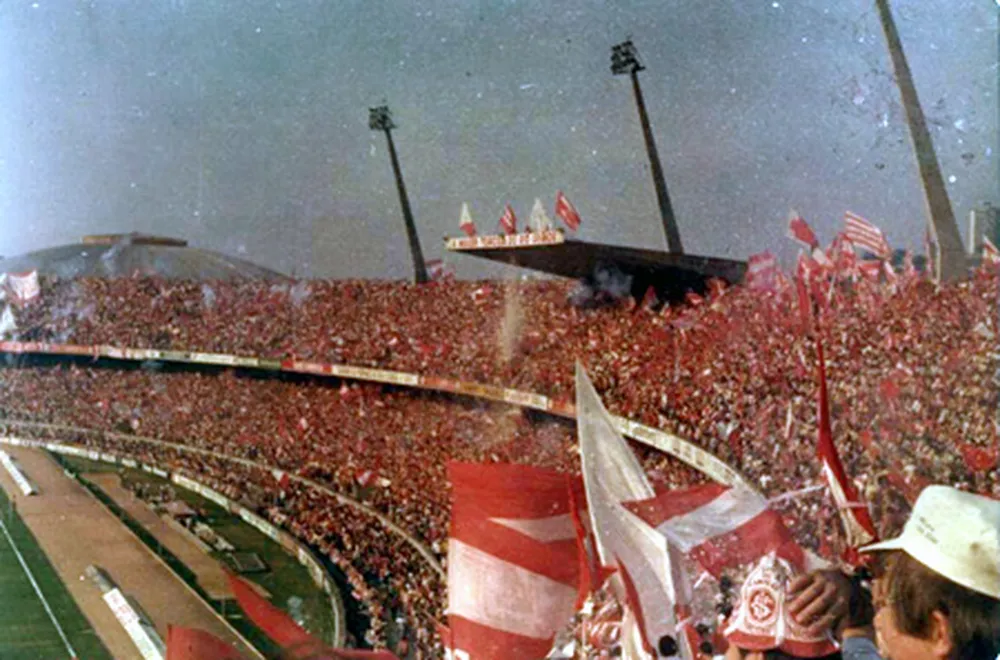
Internacional fans at Beira-Rio during 1979 Brazilian Championship

Most of Internacional's most important titles were won playing in the Beira-Rio. In its first decade of existence, the Giagante reinforced Internacional's sovereignty in Rio Grande do Sul and also helped the club conquer Brazil. In 1975, just six years after its opening, Beira-Rio hosted its inaugural Brasileirão final on December 14. Inter and Cruzeiro, two national giants, competed for the national trophy, with Figueroa emerging as the hero. He leapt to head Valdomiro's cross into Raul's net, scoring the infamous Illuminated goal (named so because he had been illuminated by a beam of sunlight) and securing victory for the Colorado, and by extension first place in the nation's footballing hierarchy for the first time.

In 1976, the Brazilian Championship final was hosted at the Beira-Rio again. Internacional welcomed Corinthians after eliminating Atlético Mineiro in the previous stage. A highlight of these events was a goal score by Falcão.

In the late 1970s, Internacional defeated Vasco 2–1 on December 23, 1979, winning a Brasileirão without any defeats and securing the national tri-championship once again within its home grounds.

On February 12, 1989, Beira-Rio hosted, for the second leg of the 1988 Brasileirão semifinals, its greatest rival, Grêmio, in what became known as the Grenal of the Century. A total of 78,083 people occupied the Beira-Rio stands during the game. The red side ended the first half down 1–0 and with just ten players on the pitch after Grêmio dominated the first 45 minutes. In the second half, the Colorados came from behind to defeat Grêmio 2–1 with two goals scored by striker Nílson.

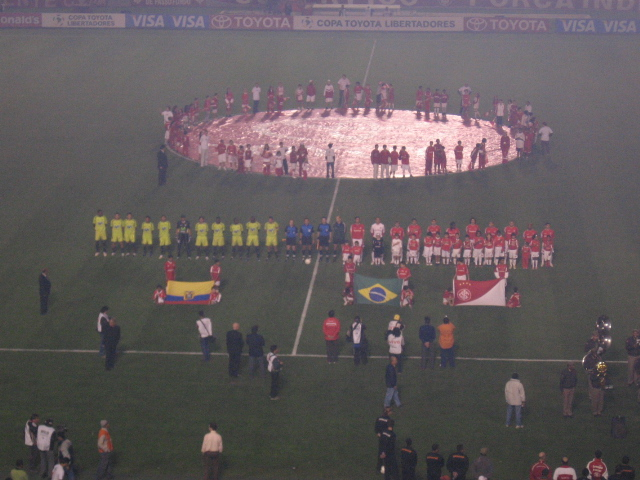
Internacional and LDU Quito in the 2006 Copa Libertadores quarter-final at Beira-Rio.

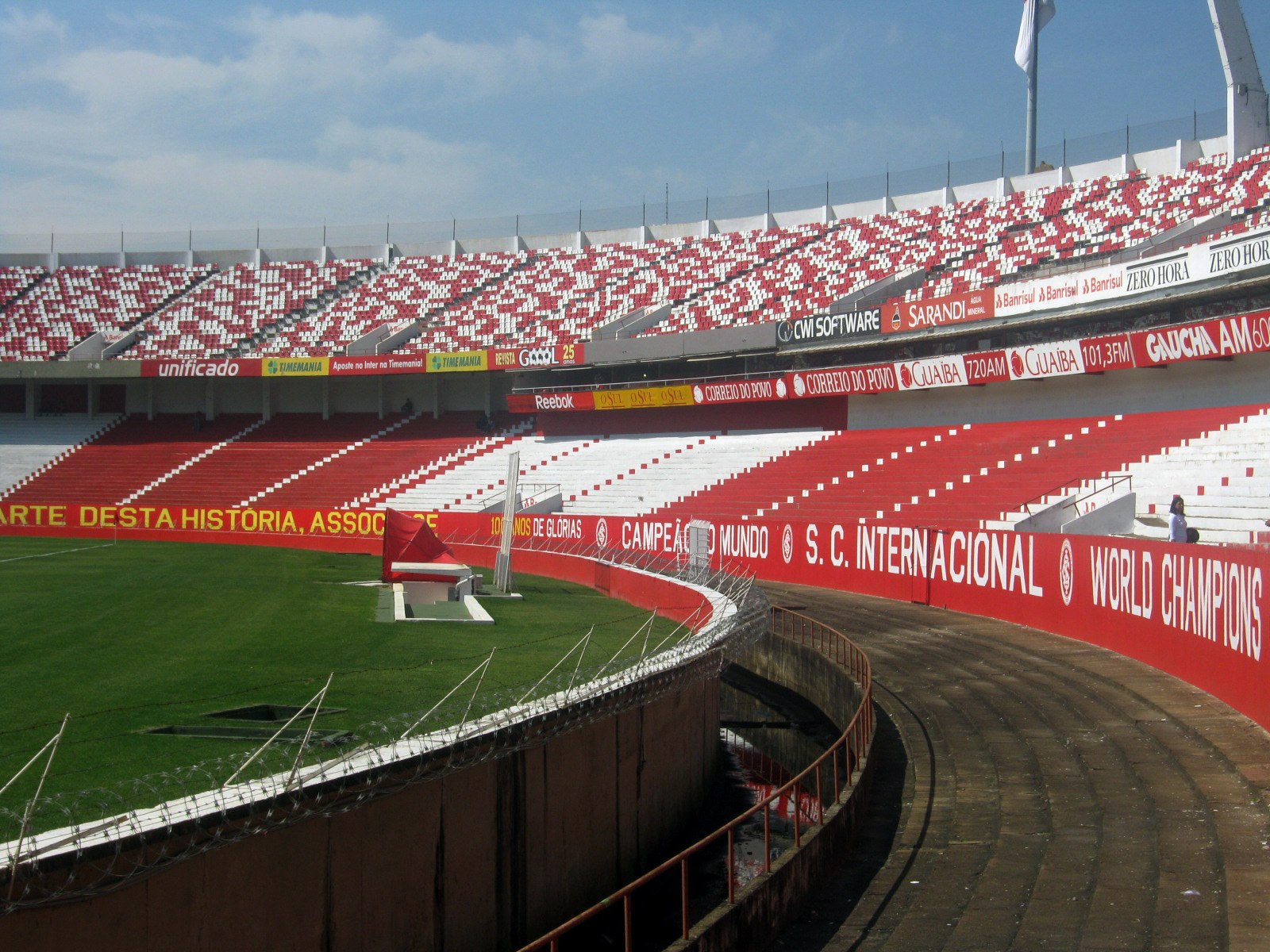
Beira-Rio in 2009

In 1992, Beira-Rio hosted the second leg of the Copa do Brasil final. After the 2–1 scoreline of the first match, Internacional won via a penalty kick by Célio Silva in the 88th minute; the club secured the title due to the away goals rule.

In the 2000s, Internacional won a sequence of international titles, all at the Beira-Rio. Starting with the 2006 Copa Libertadores. After a 2–1 victory at Morumbi, Inter drew 2–2 with São Paulo FC. There were 57,554 fans at the Gigante on the night of August 16. The first goal came at the 29th minute of the first half, aided by Ceni, who failed to hold onto a cross, allowing Fernandão to score. At the 20th minute of the second half, Tinga scored.

In 2007, Beira-Rio hosted Recopa Sudamericana final, with 51,023 Internacional fans present at the game. After a setback of 2–1 in the first match, the second leg was fueled by the young Alexandre Pato, and Internacional beat the Mexicans of Pachuca by 4–0, with two goals from Pato, another from Pinga, and one more from Alex.

In 2008, Internacional won another international final at the Beira-Rio. Even with one player less, Inter beat Estudiantes de La Plata in the first leg, played at the Estadio Ciudad de La Plata, by 1–0. The following week, 51,803 fans were present at the match where Nilmar scored the title-winning goal in extra time. As the center circle was pointed out, the crowd repeated the spectacle from the moment the teams entered the field, with their flares and fireworks illuminating the Porto Alegre night.

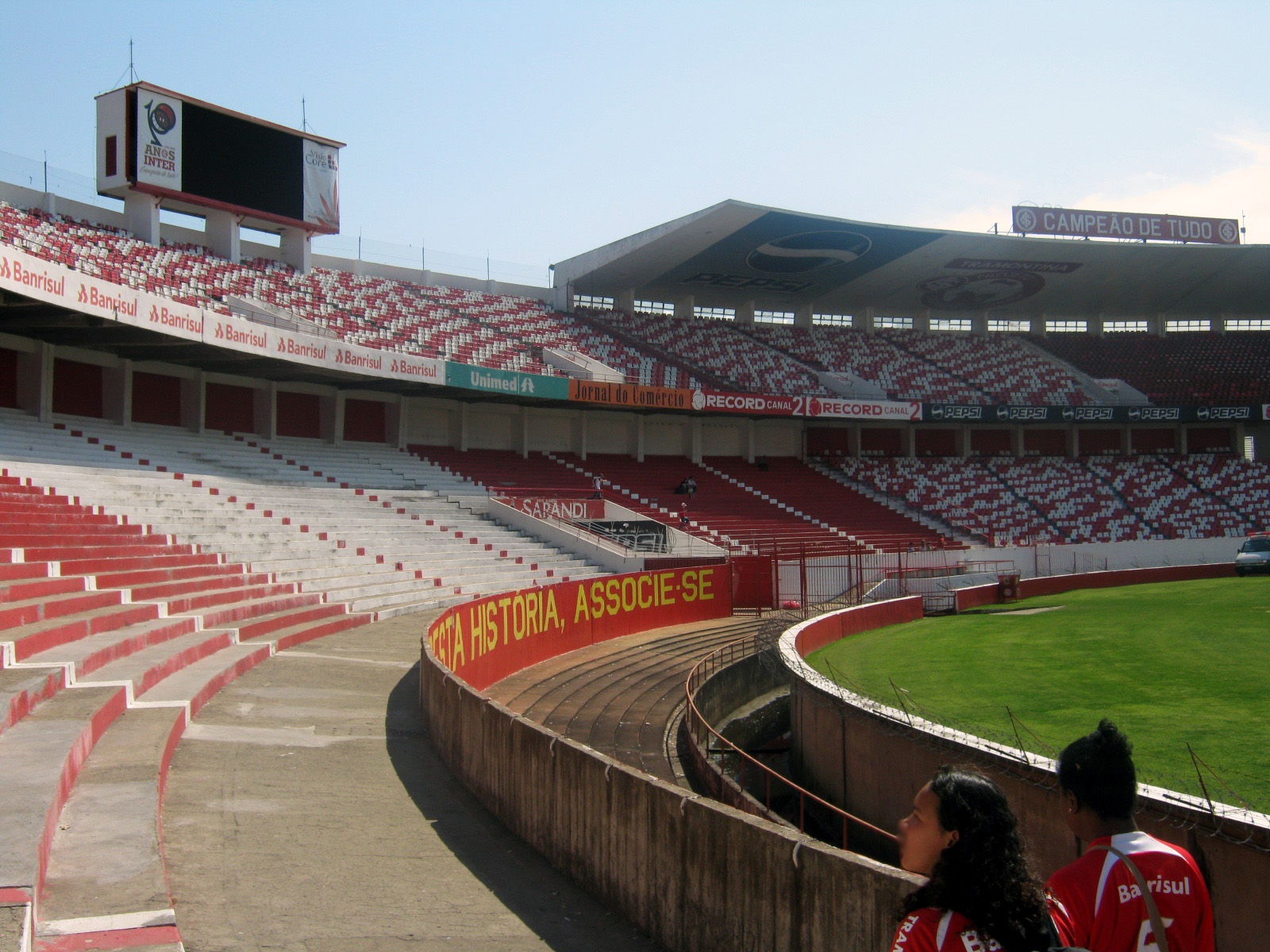
Beira-Rio in 2009

In 2010, Internacional once again reached the final of the Libertadores and once again the second leg was played at the Beira-Rio. Playing against Chivas Guadalajara in Mexico, the Colorado team won 2–1. At Beira-Rio, it won 3–2. The game was then conducted by an orchestra for 90 minutes.

In 2011, with the stadium already under renovation for the World Cup and with limited capacity, Internacional won a 3–1 victory led by Leandro Damião, who scored twice, and Kléber, who converted a penalty, securing the Recopa Sudamericana title. This was the last title won outside the state realm before the stadium's remodeling.

== 'Gigante Para Sempre' (Giant Forever) renovation ==
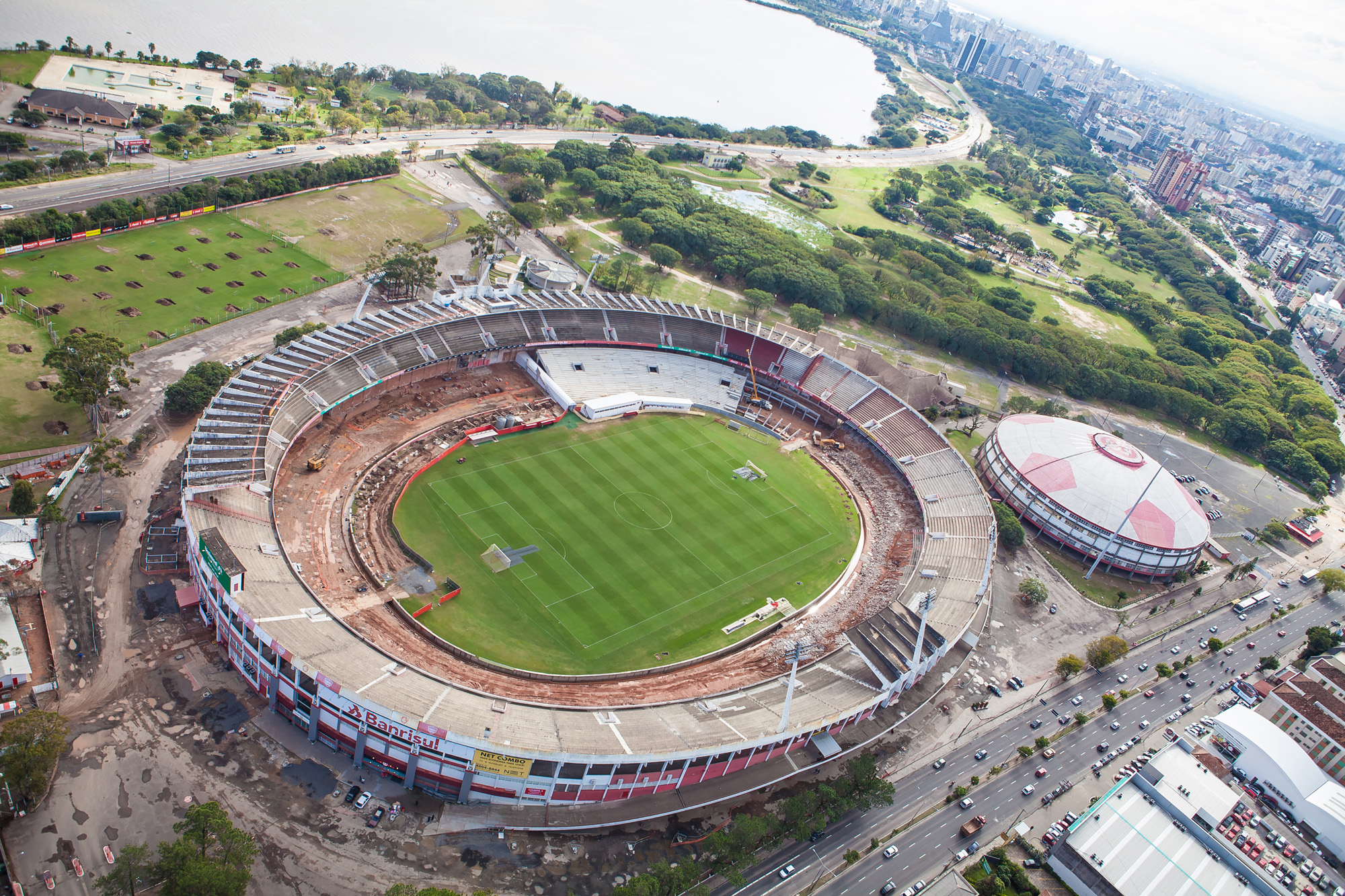
Beira-Rio during the renovation works in 2012.

The Beira-Rio underwent a major modernization process for the 2014 World Cup. The project, titled 'Gigante Para Sempre' (Giant Forever), took about two years to complete, beginning with minor works in 2010 and picking up in March 2012, when the partnership with Andrade Gutierrez began. The stadium was completely closed for renovations for the World Cup starting in December 2012. During this period, Internacional was temporarily based in other stadiums, such as Estádio do Vale in Novo Hamburgo and Estádio Centenário in Caxias do Sul. This was seen as the disruption which caused the team to lose several games.

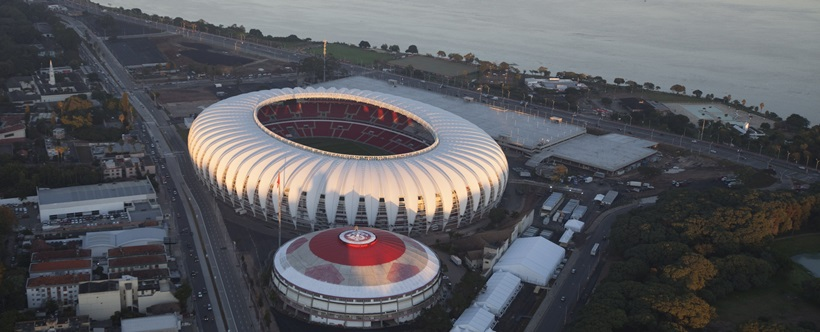
Beira-Rio's new roof has become an architectural landmark of Porto Alegre.

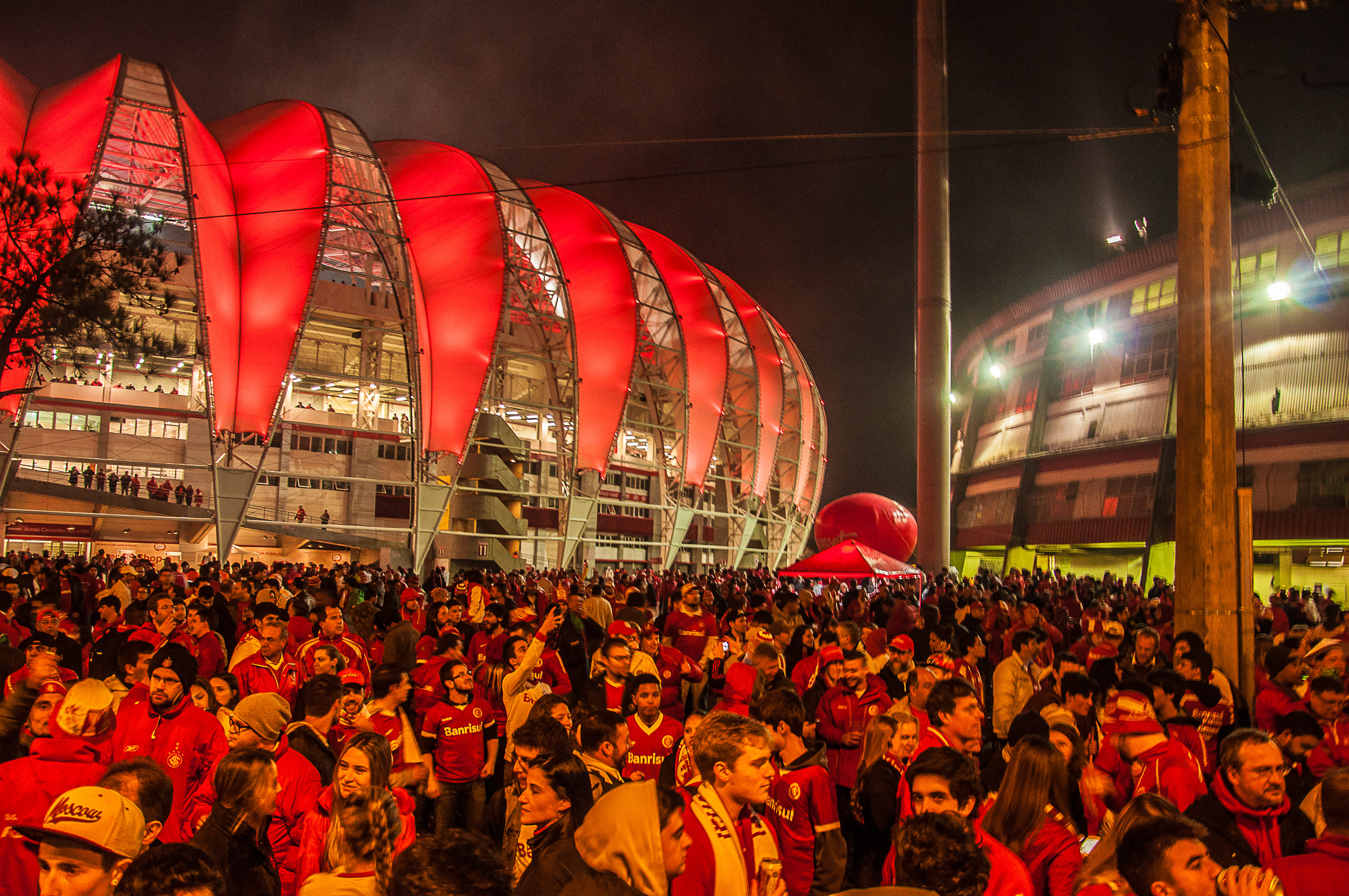
The stadium's roof, illuminated in red during the 2015 season.

The Beira-Rio's new roof consists of 65 interlocked modules, composed of approximately 4,700 tons of steel. The stadium is 36 meters in height and 53 meters in length, with its membrane made of PTFE (polytetrafluoroethylene). In the main modules, the membrane is opaque, while in the spaces between panels, it is translucent, allowing its internal lighting to shine through. The equipment has a non-stick surface to aid cleaning, and is made of a material which is resistant to flames, ultraviolet radiation and corrosive agents. The stadium's lighting is able to change between a variety of colors. The system adopts 910 projectors of 41 watts, distributing 14 reflectors per roof panel.

The entire upper bleachers and the retaining wall of the lower ones were preserved from the original structure of the Beira-Rio. The old canopy, located on the side closest to the river, and the popularly known "cap" next to Padre Cacique, were also kept (although with alterations) to accommodate the Upper Boxes and the Command Operations Center (COC).

=== Grass ===
The permanent grass installed is Bermuda Tifgrand, while in winter, Ryegrass is planted. The field's drainage system is vacuum-based, ensuring playable conditions even under heavy rain. The lawn irrigation operates from 15 reservoirs of 12 thousand liters each, totaling a reserve of 180 thousand liters. The system has 24 sprinklers to irrigate the playing field.

=== Capacity ===
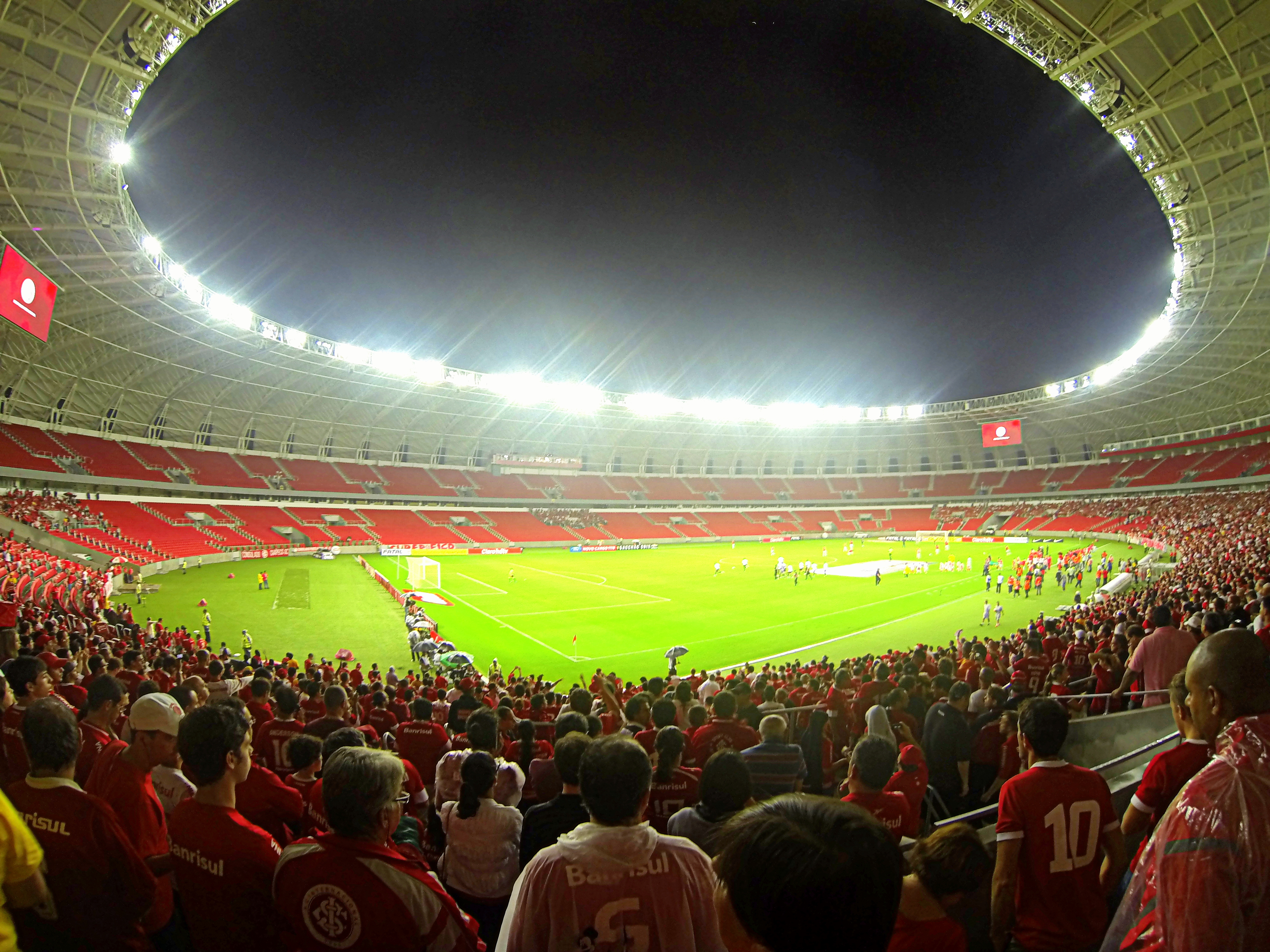
Beira-Rio is the second biggest stadium in south Brazil.

Beira-Rio is the second biggest stadium in the Rio Grande do Sul state and in South Brazil. It can currently accommodate up to 50,848 people. This includes seating in the stands, 71 skyboxes located on the stadium's fourth level, 39 grandstands featuring two lounges, and 55 upper-level skyboxes with an 18-person capacity each. Additionally, a standing area introduced in early 2019 can hold up to 5,000 supporters. In the event of an emergency, the entire stadium can be evacuated in under 8 minutes, in accordance with FIFA's guidelines.

=== Infrastructure ===
Able to enhance colors and prevent any shadows, the lighting system utilizes 404 projectors, each with a power rating of 2,000 watts. The Beira-Rio has 16 press boxes, with 12 of them being smaller, and another 4 for television. There is also a space designated for the positioning of game cameras.

The stadium has been adapted to an international standard, and is thus able to host both national and international games. Beira-Rio is one of the three 2014 FIFA World Cup stadiums to be privately owned, alongside Arena da Baixada and Arena Corinthians.

The Beira-Rio complex also houses a chapel, an events center, bars, stores, and a parking building for 3,000 cars. Parque Gigante, featuring pools, gyms, football fields, and tennis courts, is located next to it.

=== Reinauguration ===
The first test event for the new stadium was on February 15, 2014. Internacional beat SER Caxias and won 4–0. The opening match on April 6, 2014 (which was at full capacity) was a friendly one between Internacional and Peñarol. D'Alessandro scored an early goal just four minutes into the game, officially opening the red house. He celebrated with his hands covering his face. D'Alessandro also scored the second goal from a penalty, allowing Internacional to achieve a 2–1 victory over the Charruas.

== 2014 FIFA World Cup ==
Date	Time (UTC-03)	Team #1	Result	Team #2	Round	Attendance
June 15, 2014	16:00	France	3–0	Honduras	Group E	43,012
June 18, 2014	13:00	Australia	2–3	Netherlands	Group B	42,877
June 22, 2014	16:00	South Korea	2–4	Algeria	Group H	42,732
June 25, 2014	13:00	Nigeria	2–3	Argentina	Group F	43,285
June 30, 2014	17:00	Germany	2–1 (a.e.t.)	Algeria	Round of 16	43,063

== 2027 FIFA Women's World Cup ==
Date	Time (UTC-03)	Team #1	Result	Team #2	Round	Attendance
26 June 2027	--:--	C3	v	C4	Group C	
28 June 2027	--:--	H1	v	H2	Group H	
30 June 2027	--:--	B4	v	B2	Group B	
3 July 2027	--:--	F4	v	F2	Group F	
5 July 2027	--:--	C4	v	C1	Group C	
8 July 2027	--:--	H4	v	H1	Group H	
12 July 2027	--:--	Winner Group E	v	Runner-up Group F	Round of 16	

== Concerts ==
Concerts at Estádio Beira-Rio
Date	Artist	Tour	Attendance
10 October 2011	Justin Bieber	My World Tour	20,698
25 March 2012	Roger Waters	The Wall Live	42,436
11 April 2015	Roberto Carlos	TBA	40,000
17 October 2015	Los Hermanos	Turnê de Reunião	15,000
2 March 2016	The Rolling Stones	América Latina Olé Tour 2016	49,073
12 June 2016	Ana Carolina & Seu Jorge	Ana & Jorge	12,000
11 October 2016	Aerosmith	Rock 'N' Roll Rumble Tour	19,476
8 November 2016	Guns N' Roses	Not in This Lifetime... Tour	50,567
2 December 2016	Nando Reis + Natiruts + Criolo	POA Love Festival	8,000
4 April 2017	Elton John + James Taylor	Wonderful Crazy Night Tour	17,987
6 September 2017	Leonardo e Eduardo Costa	Cabaré	5,000
19 September 2017	Bon Jovi	This House Is Not for Sale Tour	45,000
26 September 2017	The Who + Def Leppard	The Who Tour 2017	16,000
13 October 2017	Paul McCartney	One On One Tour	45,774
24 October 2017	John Mayer	The Search for Everything World Tour	20,000
7 November 2017	Green Day	Revolution Radio Tour	18,000
27 February 2018	Phil Collins	Not Dead Yet Tour	28,000
4 March 2018	Foo Fighters + Queens of the Stone Age	Concrete and Gold Tour	41,000

== See also ==
- List of football stadiums in Brazil
- Lists of stadiums

Preceded by Estadio Defensores del Chaco, Asunción; La Bombonera, Buenos Aires	Copa Libertadores; First leg Final Venue; 1980; Estadio Centenario, Montevideo (Second leg)	Succeeded by Maracanã, Rio de Janeiro; Estadio Nacional, Santiago
Preceded by La Bombonera, Buenos Aires; Estadio Palogrande, Manizales	Copa Libertadores; First leg Final Venue; 2005; Estádio do Morumbi, São Paulo (Second leg)	Succeeded by Beira-Rio, Porto Alegre; Estádio do Morumbi, São Paulo
Preceded by Beira-Rio, Porto Alegre; Estádio do Morumbi, São Paulo	Copa Libertadores; Second leg Final Venue; 2006; Estádio do Morumbi, São Paulo (First leg)	Succeeded by La Bombonera, Buenos Aires; Estádio Olímpico Monumental, Porto Alegre
Preceded by La Bombonera, Buenos Aires; Estádio do Morumbi, São Paulo	Recopa Sudamericana; Second leg Final Venue; 2007; Estadio Hidalgo, Pachuca (First leg)	Succeeded by Estadio Juan D. Perón, Avellaneda; La Bombonera, Buenos Aires
Preceded by Estadio Azteca, Mexico City; Estadio Juan D. Perón, Avellaneda	Copa Sudamericana; Second leg Final Venue; 2008; Estadio Ciudad de La Plata, La Plata (First leg)	Succeeded by Estadio Casa Blanca, Quito; Maracanã, Rio de Janeiro
Preceded by Estadio Juan D. Perón, Avellaneda; La Bombonera, Buenos Aires	Recopa Sudamericana; First leg Final Venue; 2009; Estadio Casa Blanca, Quito (Second leg)	Succeeded by Estadio Casa Blanca, Quito; Estadio Centenario Dr. José Luis Meiszner, Quilmes
Preceded by Estadio Ciudad de La Plata, La Plata; Mineirão, Belo Horizonte	Copa Libertadores; Second leg Final Venue; 2010; Estadio Omnilife, Zapopan (First leg)	Succeeded by La Bombonera, Buenos Aires; Estádio do Pacaembu, São Paulo
Preceded by Estadio Casa Blanca, Quito; Estadio Centenario, Quilmes	Recopa Sudamericana; Second leg Final Venue; 2011; Estadio Libertadores de América, Avellaneda (First leg)	Succeeded by Estadio Nacional, Santiago; Estádio do Pacaembu, São Paulo
