= D'Alessandro =

D'Alessandro, Dalessandro, or Dallesandro is a surname. Notable people with the surname include:

== D'Alessandro ==
- Andrés D'Alessandro (born 1981), Argentine footballer
- Deanna D'Alessandro, Australian chemist
- Dominic D'Alessandro (born 1947), Italian former CEO of Manulife Financial
- Franco D'Alessandro (born 1967/1969), American playwright
- Jorge D'Alessandro (born 1949), Argentine former footballer
- Lorenzo d'Alessandro (died 1503), Italian painter and interpreter
- Luciano D'Alessandro (born 1977), Venezuelan actor
- Marco D'Alessandro (born 1991), Italian footballer
- Matteo D'Alessandro (born 1989), Italian footballer
- Mercedes D'Alessandro (born 1978), Argentine writer and economist
- Pete D'Alessandro, General Manager of the Sacramento Kings of the NBA
- Toni Dalli (born name Antonio D'Alessandro, 1933–2021), Italian musician and restaurant owner

== D'Alesandro ==
- Thomas D'Alesandro Jr. (1903–1987), American politician
- Thomas D'Alesandro III (1929–2019), American politician
- Nancy D'Alesandro Pelosi (born 1940), American politician and former Speaker of the House of Representatives

== Dalessandro ==
- Andrea Dalessandro, American politician
- David Dalessandro, University of Pittsburgh administrator
- James Dalessandro (born 1948), American writer and filmmaker
- Peter J. Dalessandro (1918–1997), United States Army Medal of Honor awardee
- Robert J. Dalessandro (born 1958), American historian and author

== Dallesandro ==
- Joe Dallesandro (born 1948), American actor

== See also ==
- Dalesandro
