= Fernandinho =

Fernandinho is a hypocorism of the name Fernando and means "Little Fernando" or "Fernando Jr." in Portuguese.

It may refer to:

== Footballers ==
- Fernandinho (footballer, born January 1981), Éldis Fernando Damasio, Brazilian football attacking midfielder
- Fernandinho (footballer, born April 1981), Fernando Alves Santa Clara, Brazilian football left-back
- Fernandinho (footballer, born May 1985), Fernando Luiz Roza, Brazilian football defensive midfielder for Athletico Paranaense
- Fernandinho (footballer, born August 1985), Fernando Galhardo Borges, Brazilian football left-back
- Fernandinho (footballer, born November 1985), Luiz Fernando Pereira da Silva, Brazilian winger for Retrô FC Brasil
- Fernandinho (footballer, born 1991), Fernando Barros Bezerra Júnior, Brazilian football left-back
- Fernandinho (footballer, born 1992), Fernando Nathan Padilha de Arruda, Brazilian football winger
- Fernandinho (footballer, born March 1993), Fernando Henrique da Conceição, Chinese football winger for Shanghai Shenhua
- Fernandinho (footballer, born July 1993), Fernando Augusto Rodrigues de Araujo, Brazilian football defender for Floriana
- Fernandinho (footballer, born February 1997), Fernando Camões de Araújo, Portuguese football midfielder for Barreirense
- Fernandinho (footballer, born July 1997), Fernando José Marques Maciel, Brazilian football forward for Mirassol
- Fernandinho (footballer, born 2003), Fernando Paiva Correa, Brazilian football forward for Náutico

== Futsal ==
- Fernandinho (futsal player) (born 1983), Brazilian futsal player who plays as a pivot

== See also ==
- Fernandão (nickname)
- Fernando
