= Mercedes D'Alessandro =

Argentine economist (born 1978)

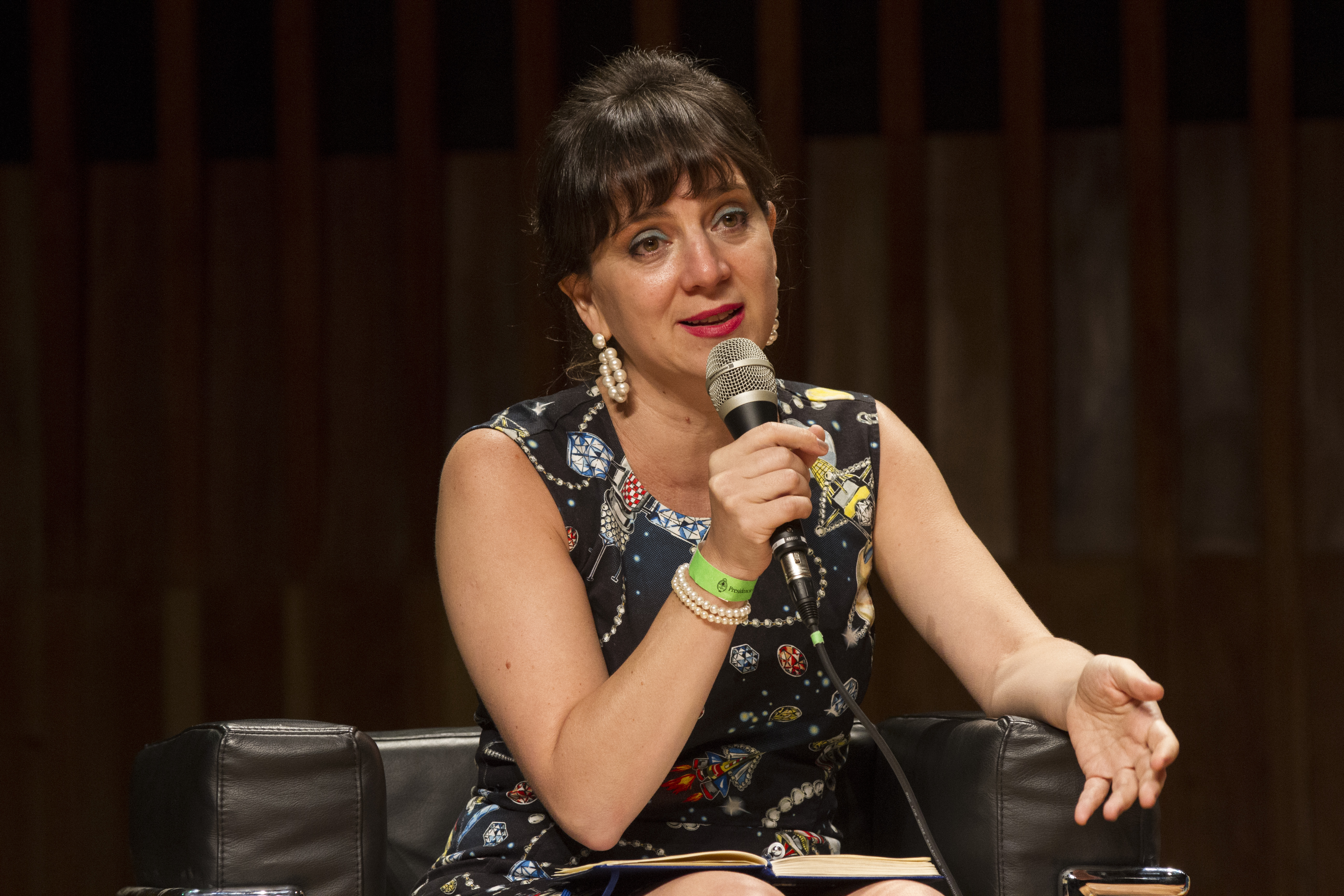
- Born: January 26, 1978 (age 48); Posadas, Misiones
- Occupation: Economist
- Known for: Feminist Economics

Mercedes D'Alessandro (Posadas, Misiones, January 26, 1978) is an Argentine writer and economist. She wrote the book Feminist Economics: How to Build an Egalitarian Society (Without Losing Glamour), published in Argentina, Mexico, Colombia, and Spain, and currently in its fifth issue. D'Alessandro is also a co-founder of the digital publication Economia Femini(s)ta (Feminist Economics). This publication's goal is to produce and promote economic information with a gender perspective .

== Career ==
D'Alessandro studied economic science at the University of Buenos Aires, institution she graduated from in 2001. She gained her PhD in Economics from the same university in 2013, when she specialized in critical studies of economic epistemology. She directed the School of Economics at the National University of General Sarmiento, and was also a professor and researcher both at the National University of General San Martín and at the University of Buenos Aires.

== Feminist Economics ==
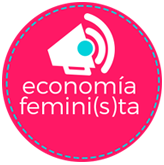
Feminist Economics logo

Between 2015 and 2019, D'Alessandro coordinated the space for communication of science Economía Feminista (Feminist Economics), that produces information, data, and statistical analysis about gender and workforce in Argentina. In this context, during 2016, she wrote the book Economía feminista: cómo construir una sociedad igualitaria (sin perder el glamour) (Feminist Economics: how to build an egalitarian society (without losing glamour)).

In her book, D'Alessandro draws on the collaborative work of a group of feminist economists that analyzed the gender inequalities present in the economy, questioning the theoretical assumptions of the discipline. This book recommends a heuristic tool as a solution to the inequalities that women face to access the workforce, the pay gap, unpaid work, the distribution of chores connected to caring for others, and the difference in poverty between men and women.

The book Feminist Economics was awarded the Lola Mora Prize in 2016, an award given by the Government of the City of Buenos Aires in the category of digital media.

== Books ==
D'Alessandro published several books:

In 2011 she published Más allá de la Economía Política… Más acá de la Filosofía. El conocer como crítica transformadora (Beyond Political Economics... Closer to Philosophy. Knowledge as a Transformational Critique), for which she was an editor.

In 2016 she published Economía feminista: cómo construir una sociedad igualitaria (sin perder el glamour) (Feminist Economics: How to Build an Egalitarian Society (Without Losing Glamour)). This book was declared of social interest by the Buenos Aires City Legislative Power, and by the municipalities of Posadas and Rosario.

In December 2017, D'Alessandro published ¿El futuro es feminista? (Is the future feminist?), published by Le Monde Diplomatique (Southern hemisphere edition), co-authored with Florencia Angiletta and Marina Mariasch.

== Publications ==
D'Alessandro has been publishing journalistic articles since 2015, published in different communication channels connected to gender. Among her topics are: the need for appropriate State politics, economics from a gender perspective, and women in the working force.

Within the intersection of women and work, she analyzes topics like the gender pay gap, the glass ceiling, domestic labour, political participation and power pulls, private enterprises and new families, among others.
