= The Illuminated Goal =

1975 football goal

The Illuminated Goal is a historic goal scored in 1975 in the Brazilian football league by Chilean defender Elías Figueroa.

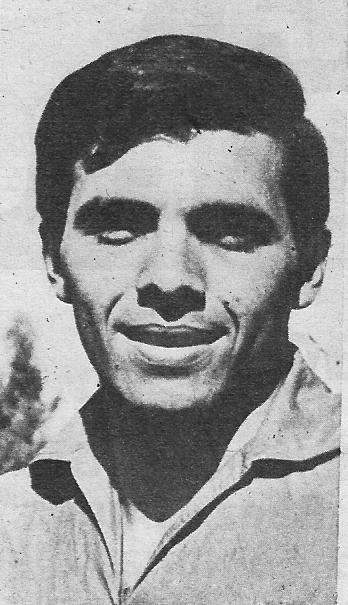
Elías Figueroa in 1973

== The Match ==
The event took place on December 14, 1975, at the Estádio Beira-Rio. The home team, Internacional de Porto Alegre, was striving to win the Brazilian championship for the first time in its history. Eleven minutes into the second half, midfielder Valdomiro was driving the ball forward when he was fouled by a defender from the opposing team, Cruzeiro of Belo Horizonte. Referee Dulcidio Boschilia awarded a free kick.

The score was tied 0–0, and the sky was completely overcast.

Valdomiro took the free kick from the right side, sending the ball high into the box. Rising to meet it was Chilean central defender Elías Figueroa. At that precise moment, an unexpected ray of sunlight broke through the clouds, illuminating the exact spot where Figueroa leaped higher than Cruzeiro's defenders. With a powerful header, he sent the ball into the net. The torcida colorada erupted in celebration, and the Beira-Rio was thrown into total delirium. It was the only goal of the match, and Internacional became champions.

== Documentation ==
All videos and photographs clearly captured how, on that dark afternoon, Figueroa's decisive header was illuminated by a powerful beam of light from the sky. From that day onward, the moment was immortalized as the legendary "Illuminated Goal."

Legend has it that after that day in Porto Alegre, several female fans would come to Figueroa's home, asking him to touch their sick children and heal their ailments with his "miraculous gift."

== Awards ==
At the end of 1975, Elías Figueroa was named South American Footballer of the Year for the second consecutive time.
