= Dalesandro =

Dalesandro is a surname. Notable people with the surname include:

- Mark Dalesandro (born 1968), American baseball player
- Sonny Dalesandro (born 1977), American soccer player and restaurateur

== See also ==
- D'Alessandro
