= Franco D'Alessandro =

American dramatist

- Born: June 15, 1967 (age 59); Yonkers, New York, U.S.
- Education: Fordham University (BA); Fordham University (MAT)
- Occupations: Playwright; Teacher; Professor of Playwriting; Poet
- Years active: 1996–present
- Website: www.francodalessandro.com

Franco D'Alessandro (born June 15, 1967) is a New York-born playwright, poet, author, and educator. In the mid-1990s, he had eight one-act plays produced Off-Off Broadway in five years. The American playwright has had twenty-two international, Off-Broadway, and regional productions of his work and has been published or produced in eight languages over 11 countries on four continents. His Off-Broadway hit play Roman Nights explores the tumultuous lives of stage and screen legends Anna Magnani and Tennessee Williams. This play was a critical and commercial success in New York (2002) and London (2004); various productions of the play have been touring much of the world ever since, including a two-year run in South America and 15-year run in the Czech Republic and Eastern Europe. The play has been running somewhere on the globe every year for 20 years and has been nominated for and/or received various awards the world over.

== Early life and education ==
D’Alessandro was born in Yonkers, New York to a nurse mother and physician father. His mother, Mary Grace, was Irish-American and his father, Francesco (Frank) D’Alessandro, was from an Italian immigrant family from southern Italy's Basilicata (Lucania) region in the province of Matera. D’Alessandro attended Iona Preparatory School in New Rochelle, New York. He attended Villanova University, studied in Siena, Italy and eventually transferred to Fordham University where he graduated with a B.A in 1989. In summer of 1990 he studied with Thierry Pathé at New York University's Filmmaking Program. In 2003, D’Alessandro received a master's degree (M.A.T.) in English Education. D’Alessandro speaks fluent English, Italian, and basic Gaeilge.

== Career ==
Following the June 2001 run of The Sweet Life at Soho Repertory Theater/Walker Space, Time to Storm in association with HERE and Michael Kagdis' CuriousArts, presented Worlds Collide... at the bottom of a glass in December 2001. The production featured three short plays by award-winning playwright Franco D'Alessandro, connected by live musical performance from Josh Joplin, who served as a guide through the evening's program.

Is That You or Is That Me? is a futuristic story dealing with the triumph of love in the face of one-upmanship and rabid consumerism. And On… is both a searing and poetic look at three generations coping with loss and love and how family influences our emotional mind-set. The evening culminates with Before and After, a double play, which has contemporaneous stories unfolding. It is alternately scathing political satire and drama, which examines life before and after the September 11th attacks. The production was dedicated to a TTS founding member, actor Kevin Cleary, who was killed on 9/11. The evening's plays were directed by Jared Coseglia, Michael French, and Eva Minemar and presented by TTS Artistic Director John-Dylan Howard. The production ran from Wednesday December 19 through Sunday December 23, 2001 at the HERE Arts Center - the Dorothy Williams Theater.

In 2002, his two character play about Tennessee Williams and Anna Magnani, titled Roman Nights, premiered Off-Broadway at the Daryl Roth Theatre in Union Square, Manhattan, produced by Suzanne Corso. The New York premiere production received respectable critical and commercial success for the writer. This three-act play went on to be produced in London in 2004 and again in Prague in 2006, where it has since been on a six-year sold-out tour of Eastern Europe. In 2011, the play opened in Buenos Aires as Noches Romanas under the direction of Oscar Barney Finn; that year it was also performed in France, Italy, and Spain as part of various international Tennessee Williams centenary celebrations. In 2011, the playwright created an alternate, shorter production version of that play entitled Tenn & Anna. In November 2011, Eva Minemar directed Italian actress Lidia Vitale in Solo Anna, a new one-woman play D'Alessandro wrote which draws from his years of researching and writing about Anna Magnani; it played again to sold-out crowds in Los Angeles and Rome in 2012 under the direction of Minemar. It arrived on the New York stage in 2012 and has been touring since 2013. The play received two major theater awards, the Premio Anna Magnani and the Enriquez Award for Excellence in Theater.

In 2004, D’Alessandro's AIDS drama, The Shattering, was workshopped at the Cherry Lane Theatre with Olympia Dukakis and Christina Zorich.

In 2015, D’Alessandro's new play, Dancing Barefoot in the Dark was a Eugene O'Neill Theater Center New Play semi-finalist. The play is part of a trilogy that looks at the late 20th century Irish-American experience based on the author's own experiences.

Over the years, there have been no less than three attempts to make a feature film of Roman Nights, one with Peter Bogdanovich attached as director. As of 2022, the film script is currently in development for a second time with Rose Pictures, Ltd.

== Poetry and Publications ==
In June 2009, Finishing Line Press published D'Alessandro's first collection of poetry entitled Supplications: Immediate Poems of Loss and Love (ISBN 1-59924-474-8). This first small collection of poems was endorsed by the Italian American Writers Association and was nominated for a PEN New England Award. A newly completed play, White Elephants Dancing The Flamenco, was inspired by an Ernest Hemingway short story. Stranger Love: Five Short Plays (ISBN 978-1599246215) was published in November 2010, and these plays are currently being taught by drama professors in five countries. In 2021, Finishing Line Press released Everything Is Something Else (ISBN 978-1-64662-365-5), new and selected poems. The collection covers poems written from 1989 to 2019 and concerns the author's Irish, Italian, and gay identities. His books have sold over 5,000 copies and are available online and at New York City's Drama Book Shop.

== Academia ==
Since 2002, D'Alessandro has taught English and drama at public schools in New York City. He holds two master's degrees and is a graduate of Fordham University. D'Alessandro is also an adjunct and visiting college professor of drama and writing at several universities and institutes, including summer Master Classes in Rome and other cities. After years teaching in New York City schools, D’Alessandro taught at the prestigious Bronxville School from 2015 to 2022 where he created and implemented a highly praised playwriting program for 11th and 12th graders.

== Awards and affiliations ==
D’Alessandro is a three-time Eugene O’Neill Playwrights Conference Semi-Finalist, a two-time recipient of the prestigious Edward Albee artists residency, and received many awards and residencies at the beginning of his career, including a two-time Dorset Theater Colony Residency recipient, a New Frontiers Playwright, a Cherry Lane Theatre Alternative Finalist, and a Princess Grace Award Nominee. D’Alessandro is a member of The Dramatists Guild of America (1996), The Cherry Lane Playwrights Alternative, Irish-American Writers and Artists, and the Italian American Writers Association.

== Personal life ==
D’Alessandro forged close and enduring friendships with his mentors, author Joseph Papaleo, playwright Edward Albee, and actress Olympia Dukakis.

D’Alessandro sits on the Advisory Boards of the EquiLibri/Piazza Navona Italian Literary Prize, where he is a poetry judge, and on the Elizabeth Seton Children's, a home and care facility for medically complex children. D’Alessandro is gay, and much of his poetry chronicles coming out in his high school and college years. He lives with his husband in Westchester County, New York.
