= Fernandão =

Fernandão is a hypocorism of the name Fernando, and means "Big Fernando" or "Fernando Sr." in Portuguese.

People named Fernandão include:

- Fernandão (footballer, born 1978) (1978–2014), full name Fernando Lúcio da Costa, Brazilian football manager and former footballer.
- Fernandão (footballer, born 1987), full name José Fernando Viana de Santana, Brazilian footballer
- Fernandão (futsal player) (born 1980), full name Fernando Maciel Gonçalves, Spanish-Brazilian futsal player
- Fernando Ávila (born 1955), Brazilian former volleyball player

== See also ==
- Fernandinho
- Fernando
