= Fernandinho (footballer, born 1991) =

Brazilian footballer

Personal information
- Full name: Fernando Barros Bezerra Júnior
- Date of birth: 1 June 1991 (age 35)
- Place of birth: Recife, Brazil
- Height: 1.74 m (5 ft 8 1/2 in)
- Position: Defender

Youth career
- 2010: Náutico

Senior career*
Years	Team	Apps	(Gls)
2012–2013	Belo Jardim	35	(4)
2013	Central	7	(0)
2013–2016	Portimonense	49	(4)
2016	América-PE	4	(2)
2017	União Barbarense	14	(1)
2019	Petrolina	3	(0)
- * Club domestic league appearances and goals as of 10 February 2019

Fernando Barros Bezerra Júnior (born 1 June 1991), simply known as Fernandinho is a Brazilian professional footballer who plays mainly as a left back.

== Club career ==
Born in Recife, Brazil, Fernandinho had a short stint with the Náutico reserves in 2010. Between 2012 and 2013, he played for Belo Jardim in Pernembucano 3 making 35 appearances before signing for Central in 2013.

Later that year, he was transferred to Portuguese Segunda Liga outfit Portimonense.
