= Scientific communication =

Study of researchers' communication

Scientific communication is a part of information science and the sociology of science which study researchers' use of formal and informal information channels, their communicative roles (e.g., "gatekeepers"), the utilization of the formal publication system and similar issues.

== Literature ==
- Björk, B.C. (2005). A lifecycle model of the scientific communication process. LEARNED PUBLISHING, 18(3), 165–176.
- Fjordback Søndergaard, Trine; Andersen, Jack & Hjørland, Birger (2003). Documents and the communication of scientific and scholarly information. Revising and updating the UNISIST model.
- Hurd, J. M. (2000). The transformation of scientific communication: A model for 2020. Journal of the American Society for Information Science, 51(14), 1279–1283.
- Kling, R. & McKim, G. (2000). Not just a matter of time: Field differences and the shaping of electronic media in supporting scientific communication. JOURNAL OF THE AMERICAN SOCIETY FOR INFORMATION SCIENCE, 51(14), 1306–1320.
- Nelson, C. E. & Pollock, D. K. (Eds.). (1970). Communication Among Scientists and Engineers. Lexington, Massachusetts: Health Lexington Books.
- Meadows, A. J. (1974). Communication in Science. London: Butterworths.
- Meadows, A. J. (1998). Communicating Research. San Diego, CA: Academic Press.
- Mogull, S. A. (2017). Scientific and Medical Communication: A Guide for Effective Practice. New York: Routledge.
- Vickery, B. (2000). Scientific Communication in History. Lanham, MD: Scarecrow Press.
- Wojick, D. E.; Warnick, W. L.; Carroll, B. C. & Crowe, J. (2006). The Digital Road to Scientific Knowledge Diffusion. A Faster, Better Way to Scientific Progress?
