= Deanna D'Alessandro =

Australian chemist

Deanna Michelle D'Alessandro
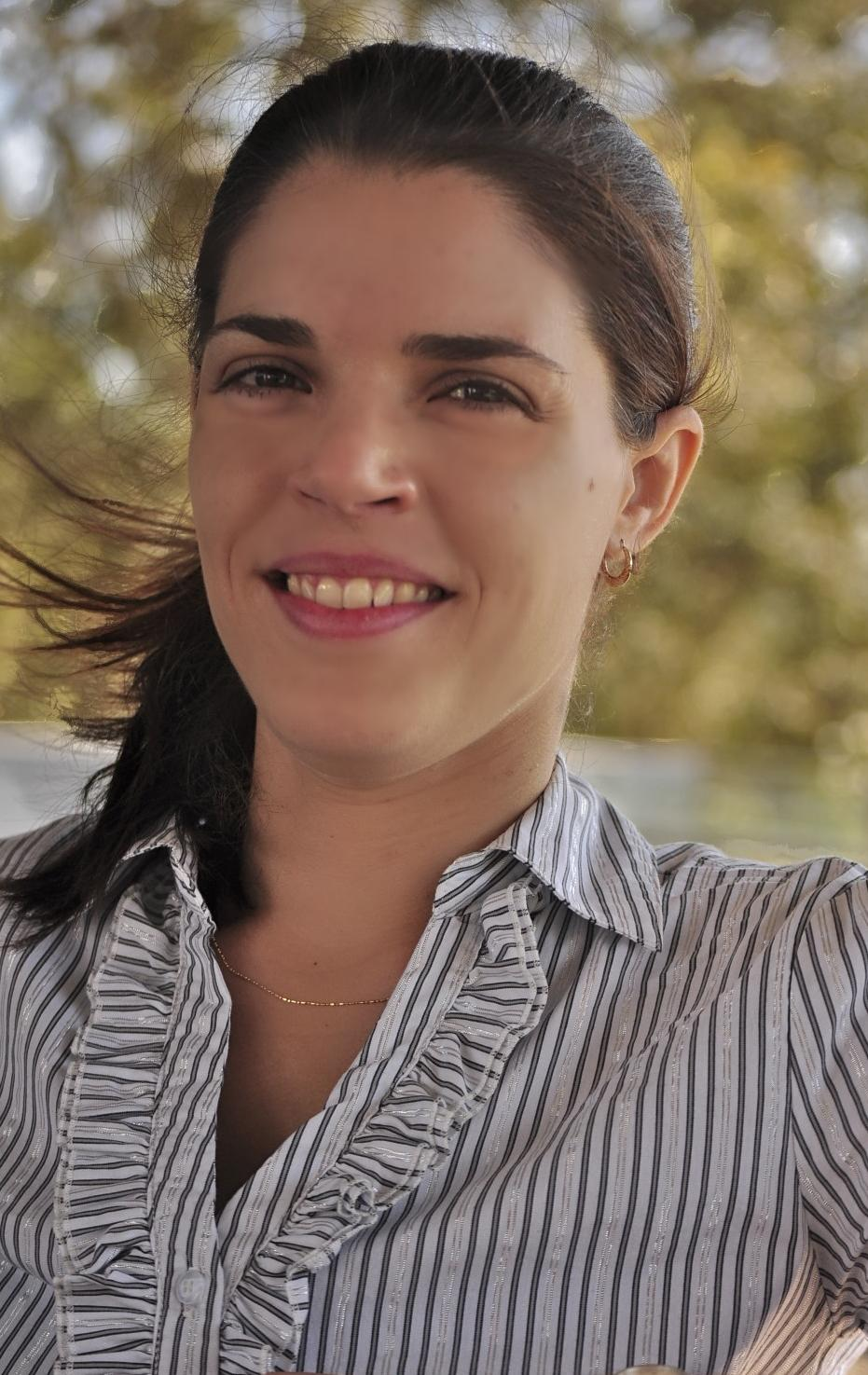
- Deanna D'Alessandro (2017)
- Education: James Cook University
- Awards: e.g., L'Oreal Australia For Women in Science
- Scientific career
- Workplaces: University of Sydney; University of California, Berkeley
- Thesis: Stereochemical effects on intervalence charge transfer (2006)

Deanna Michelle D'Alessandro is an Australian chemist who is a professor and Australian Research Council Future Fellow at the University of Sydney. Her research considers fundamental aspects of electron transfer in molecular coordination complexes and in nanoporous materials, and the development of metal–organic frameworks for environmental applications including carbon dioxide capture and conversion.

== Early life and education ==
Deanna Michelle D'Alessandro completed her Bachelor of Science degree and PhD at James Cook University. During her graduate studies, she studied the impact of stereochemistry on electron transfer with Emeritus Professor Richard Keene.

Her PhD (conferred in 2006) titled "Stereochemical Effects on Intervalence Charge Transfer" has been the subject of a number of international publications and awards including a JCU Medal of Excellence for a Doctoral Research Thesis, the 2006 Cornforth Medal of the Royal Australian Chemical Institute, and a 2007 IUPAC Prize for Young Chemists, one of five awarded internationally. She subsequently moved to a postdoctoral position at the University of Sydney in 2007, where she worked on artificial photosynthesis for developing molecular electronics devices, presenting this research in schools and to public audiences as part of "Fresh Science". D'Alessandro became qualified as a JP(Qld) in 2003.

== Research and career ==
In 2007, D'Alessandro joined Jeff Long's group at the University of California, Berkeley, where she was supported by the DOW Chemical Company's American Australian Association Fellowship and a Royal Commission for the Exhibition of 1851 Fellowship. Here she began work in metal–organic frameworks for environmental applications including carbon dioxide capture. An important advance was the first successful design and synthesis of air and water stable alkylamine-based MOFs for postcombustion carbon capture which is the subject of an international patent in addition to a number of critical reviews.

D'Alessandro returned to Australia as a University of Sydney Postdoctoral Fellow in 2010. She was made a L'Oréal-UNESCO For Women in Science Fellow at the University of Sydney in the same year, and in 2011 received an Australian Research Council QEII Fellowship which allowed her to start building her own research group. Her research considers the design and development of novel inorganic materials called metal-organic frameworks (MOFs) for multifunctional electronic, optical and magnetic devices.

She has worked to develop materials that can adsorb and transform carbon dioxide. These MOFs are porous materials with very high surface areas which are also lightweight, low cost and potentially conductive. They behave like a sponge, and can capture and separate gases such as methane, nitrogen, hydrogen and carbon dioxide, amongst others.

== Awards and honours ==
- 2018-2022 Australian Research Council Future Fellow
- 2017 Fellow, RACI
- 2017 Australian Academy of Science Le Fèvre Medal. In recognition of outstanding basic research in chemistry by researchers up to 10 years post-PhD for research conducted mainly in Australia
- 2017 RACI (Inorganic division) Alan Sargeson Lectureship. To recognise significant and innovative individual contributions to the field by researchers within 10 years of the award of their PhD
- 2017-2018 Sydney Research Accelerator (SOAR) Fellow
- 2015 Royal Society of Chemistry (RSC) ChemComm Emerging Investigator Lectureship. One of two awarded internationally to recognise an emerging scientist in the early stages of their independent academic career
- 2014 Royal Australian Chemical Institute (RACI) Rennie Medal. For a researcher with less than 10 years of professional experience for research that has contributed most towards the development of a branch of chemical science
- 2012 Chemical Society of Japan Distinguished Lectureship Award
- 2011-2016 Australian Research Council QEII Fellow
- 2011 Australian Institute of Political Science NSW Young Tall Poppy Science Award
- 2010 L'Oreal Australia for Women in Science Fellow. See the You Tube presentation here
- 2010 James Cook University Outstanding Early Career Alumni Award. One of five awarded for the past 10 years during the 40th Anniversary celebrations
- 2007-2009 Royal Commission for the Exhibition of 1851 Research Fellowship. One of 6 awarded across Commonwealth countries
- 2007-2008 DOW Chemical Company Foundation Fellowship of the American-Australian Association
- 2007 International Union of Pure and Applied Chemistry (IUPAC) Prize for Young Chemists. One of five awarded world-wide for the most outstanding PhD theses in the chemical sciences
- 2006 Royal Australian Chemical Institute (RACI) Cornforth Medal. For the most outstanding PhD thesis submitted in a branch of chemistry in Australia
- 2006 JCU PhD Medal for Excellence for a Doctoral Research Thesis
- 2006 Winner of ‘Fresh Science 2006’ & British Council Australia UK Study Tour
- 2003 Don Stranks Award (one of two awarded), RACI Inorganic Division National Conference
- 2000 JCU University Medal
- 1999 G.N. Richards Medal in Chemistry. For the best overall performance and ability in undergraduate chemistry subjects
- 1999 Joe and Val Baker Prize for Third Year Organic Chemistry. For the highest achievement in third year Organic Chemistry
- 1998 H.J. Priestly Memorial Prize. For the best overall performance and ability in second year mathematics and physics subjects
- 1998 Royal Australian Chemical Institute (North Queensland Branch) Prize for Second Year Chemistry. For the best overall performance in second year chemistry subjects
- 1997 Royal Australian Chemical Institute (Queensland Branch) Prize for First Year Chemistry. For the best performance in first year chemistry subjects
- 1997 Faculty of Science and Engineering First Year Prize. As the most outstanding student in first year science and engineering disciplines

== Select publications ==
- Deanna M D'Alessandro; Berend Smit; Jeffrey R Long (1 August 2010). "Carbon dioxide capture: prospects for new materials". Angewandte Chemie International Edition. 49 (35): 6058–6082. doi:10.1002/anie.201000431. ISSN 1433-7851. PMID 20652916. Wikidata Q37774972.
- Aude Demessence; Deanna D'Alessandro; Maw Lin Foo; Jeffrey R Long (1 July 2009). "Strong CO2 binding in a water-stable, triazolate-bridged metal-organic framework functionalized with ethylenediamine". Journal of the American Chemical Society. 131 (25): 8784–8786. doi:10.1021/ja903411w. ISSN 0002-7863. PMID 19505094. Wikidata Q45978504.
- Thomas M. McDonald; Deanna M. D'Alessandro; Rajamani Krishna; Jeffrey R. Long (2011). "Enhanced carbon dioxide capture upon incorporation of N,N′-dimethylethylenediamine in the metal–organic framework CuBTTri". Chemical Science. 2 (10): 2022. doi:10.1039/c1sc00354b. ISSN 2041-6520. Wikidata Q59281609.
