= Economía Feminista =

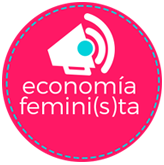
Isologo de Economía Feminista

Economía Feminista, in English: Feminist Economics, is an Argentine digital media, focused on disclosure and creation of economics information about the gender gap. The media is managed by Mercedes D`Alessandro, Magalí Brosio, Violeta Guitart and Agurtzane Urrutia.

== Concept ==
Economía Femini(s)ta, is a portmanteau of feminista and minita. It attempts to end stereotypes about women. It was created in 2015 and its goal is to be a source of economic data to help to display economic differences by gender, especially in Argentina.

== Awards ==
Economía Feminista was awarded the Lola Mora prize in 2016 for the best digital media by Dirección General de la Mujer, promoted by Buenos Aires city's Legislature.
