= Osmar =

Osmar is a given name. Notable people with the name include:

- Osmar Aparecido de Azevedo (born 1980), Brazilian striker
- Osmar Coelho Claudiano (born 1982), Brazilian right back
- Osmar Donizete Cândido (born 1968), Brazilian football player
- Osmar Ferreira Júnior (born 1987), Brazilian football striker
- Osmar Ferreyra (born 1983), Argentine football midfielder
- Osmar Ibáñez (born 1988), Spanish football player
- Osmar Mares (born 1987), Mexican footballer currently playing for Santos Laguna
- Osmar Molinas, (born 1985), football midfielder from Paraguay
- Osmar Núñez, Argentine drama and short film actor
- Osmar Rodrigues (1949–2020), Brazilian football left back
- Osmar dos Santos (born 1968), Brazilian middle-distance runner
- Osmar dos Santos Machado (born 1961), Brazilian football manager and former player
- Osmar Sigueira (born 1988), Brazilian football player
- Osmar Teixeira (born 1998), Brazilian politician
- Osmar R. Zaiane (born 1965), German computer scientist

== See also ==
- Osmer, a list of people with the given name or surname

Media related to Osmar (given name) at Wikimedia Commons
