= 1988 Campeonato Brasileiro Série A =

Campeonato Brasileiro Série A
- Season: 1988
- Champions: Bahia (2nd title)
- Copa Libertadores: Bahia; Internacional

The 1988 Campeonato Brasileiro Série A was the 32nd edition of the Campeonato Brasileiro Série A. As the 1987 Copa União organized by the Clube dos 13 proved to be even more disastrously organized than the criticized 1986 edition, organized by the CBF, the 1988 featured the merging of both modules to feature the first ever tournament with real two divisions with promotion and relegation. The 1988 season began on September 2, 1988, and reached its end on February 19, 1989. The competition was won by Esporte Clube Bahia. Internacional's Nílson, with 15 goals, was the competition's top goal scorer.

== Overview ==
It was performed by 24 teams, and Bahia won the championship. The four worst-placed teams, which were Bangu, Santa Cruz, Criciúma, and América-RJ, were relegated to the following year's second level.

== Competition format ==
First Phase
The 24 clubs were divided in two groups of 12 teams each. In the first stage all teams played against the ones of the opposite group. At the second stage, all teams played against the ones of their same group. A penalty shootout was played after the games that ended in a draw, the penalty shootout winner earned two points while the loser earned one point. The two best-placed clubs of each group in the first stage plus the two best-placed clubs of each group in the second stage qualified to the Second Phase.

Second Phase
This phase was divided in Quarterfinals, Semifinals and the Final. Each round was played in two legs. An extra time match should happen after the second match in case of draw at goal difference. Teams with superior score on the First Phase had the benefit of qualifying or being the champions in case of a persisting draw after extra time. The penalty shootout rule was no longer applied on this phase at all.

== Participating clubs ==
=== Group A ===
- Atlético Mineiro
- Atlético Paranaense
- Bangu
- Flamengo
- Fluminense
- Goiás
- Internacional
- Palmeiras
- Portuguesa
- São Paulo
- Sport
- Vitória

=== Group B ===
- América-RJ
- Bahia
- Botafogo
- Corinthians
- Coritiba
- Criciúma
- Cruzeiro
- Grêmio
- Guarani
- Santa Cruz
- Santos
- Vasco da Gama

== Standings ==
=== First phase ===
==== First stage ====
Group A

Pos	Team	Pld	W	D	L	GF	GA	GD	EP	Pts	Qualification or relegation
1	Fluminense	12	7	4	1	15	5	+10	2	27	Qualified to the second phase
2	Internacional	12	6	5	1	18	8	+10	4	27	Qualified to the second phase
3	Portuguesa	12	6	4	2	17	11	+6	2	24	
4	Atlético Mineiro	12	6	3	3	10	8	+2	2	23	
5	Flamengo	12	5	5	2	18	10	+8	3	23	
6	São Paulo	12	6	2	4	7	8	−1	0	20	
7	Sport	12	4	5	3	10	10	0	3	20	
8	Vitória	12	4	3	5	10	13	−3	3	18	
9	Goiás	12	3	5	4	9	12	−3	4	18	
10	Atlético Paranaense	12	3	5	4	10	9	+1	2	16	
11	Palmeiras	12	4	2	6	12	14	−2	1	15	
12	Bangu	12	3	4	5	8	10	−2	2	15	

Group B

Pos	Team	Pld	W	D	L	GF	GA	GD	EP	Pts	Qualification or relegation
1	Vasco da Gama	12	7	3	2	19	11	+8	3	27	Qualified to the second phase
2	Grêmio	12	7	3	2	15	5	+10	0	24	Qualified to the second phase
3	Bahia	12	5	5	2	12	11	+1	3	23	
4	Guarani	12	5	5	2	10	9	+1	2	22	
5	Coritiba	12	3	4	5	8	11	−3	3	16	
6	Santa Cruz	12	3	3	6	11	15	−4	3	15	
7	Santos	12	3	4	5	10	9	+1	1	14	
8	Botafogo	12	2	4	6	8	13	−5	2	12	
9	Cruzeiro	12	2	5	5	10	15	−5	0	11	
10	Corinthians	12	1	5	6	6	13	−7	2	10	
11	Criciúma	12	1	3	8	5	16	−11	0	6	
12	América-RJ	12	1	3	8	4	16	−12	0	6	

==== Second stage ====
Group A

Pos	Team	Pld	W	D	L	GF	GA	GD	EP	Pts	Qualification or relegation
1	Sport	11	5	3	3	10	10	0	3	21	Qualified to the second phase
2	Flamengo	11	6	2	3	14	9	+5	0	20	Qualified to the second phase
3	Portuguesa	11	6	1	4	11	10	+1	0	19	
4	Internacional	11	4	5	2	17	15	+2	2	19	
5	São Paulo	11	3	6	2	14	10	+4	4	19	
6	Atlético Mineiro	11	2	7	2	12	14	−2	4	17	
7	Palmeiras	11	3	5	3	9	8	+1	2	16	
8	Goiás	11	2	6	3	12	9	+3	4	16	
9	Atlético Paranaense	11	2	6	3	8	8	0	3	15	
10	Bangu (R)	11	1	6	4	7	12	−5	4	13	Relegated
11	Vitória	11	3	3	5	11	17	−6	0	12	
12	Fluminense	11	2	4	5	9	12	−3	1	11	

(R) Relegated for being in the four last positions on the main standings

Group B

Pos	Team	Pld	W	D	L	GF	GA	GD	EP	Pts	Qualification or relegation
1	Vasco da Gama	11	6	5	0	15	3	+12	4	27	
2	Cruzeiro	11	6	4	1	16	6	+10	1	23	Qualified to the second phase
3	Corinthians	11	5	4	2	15	9	+6	3	22	
4	Bahia (Note: Since Vasco da Gama had been qualified already and ended the stage on the qualifying zone again, Bahia was given the 8th spot to the second phase for having the highest points score between the non-qualified teams.)	11	6	2	3	16	9	+7	1	21	Qualified to the second phase
5	Coritiba	11	5	3	3	12	6	+6	2	20	
6	Botafogo	11	5	3	3	9	9	0	1	19	
7	Santos	11	4	3	4	9	16	−7	2	17	
8	Santa Cruz (R)	11	2	4	5	8	13	−5	2	12	Relegated
9	Grêmio	11	2	4	5	10	17	−7	2	12	
10	Guarani	11	2	4	5	10	13	−3	0	10	
11	Criciúma (R)	11	0	5	6	7	18	−11	3	8	Relegated
12	América-RJ (R)	11	1	3	7	7	15	−8	1	7	Relegated

(R) Relegated for being in the four last positions on the main standings

=== Second phase ===
Quarterfinals
1	Vasco da Gama	0	2
8	Fluminense*	1	1
4	Bahia*	1	0
5	Sport	1	0
2	Flamengo	0	0
7	Grêmio	0	1
3	Internacional	0	2
6	Cruzeiro	0	0

Semifinals
Fluminense	0	1
Bahia	0	2
Grêmio	0	1
Internacional	0	2

Finals
Bahia	2	0
Internacional	1	0

*Fluminense defeated Vasco da Gama on Extra Time by 2-0.

*Bahia defeated Sport after two draws for having a superior score point on the first phase. Extra time was 0-0.

=== The final ===
February 15, 1989

Bahia	2 – 1	Internacional
Bobô 26' 50'		Leomir 19'

Fonte Nova, Salvador
Attendance: 90,508
Referee: Romualdo Arpi Filho

Bahia: Ronaldo; Tarantini, João Marcelo, Claudir and Edinho; Paulo Rodrigues, Zé Carlos and Bobô; Osmar, Charles (Sandro) and Marquinhos. Head coach: Evaristo de Macedo.

Internacional: Taffarel; Luiz Carlos Winck (Diego Aguirre), Aguirregaray, Nenê and João Luís; Norberto, Luís Carlos Martins and Leomir; Maurício (Hélder), Nílson and Edu. Head coach: Abel Braga.

February 19, 1989

Internacional	0 – 0	Bahia

Beira-Rio, Porto Alegre
Attendance: 79,598
Referee: Dulcídio Wanderley Boschilia

Internacional: Taffarel; Luiz Carlos Winck, Aguirregaray, Norton and Casemiro; Norberto, Luís Fernando and Luís Carlos Martins, Maurício (Hélder), Nílson and Edu. Head coach: Abel Braga.

Bahia: Ronaldo; Tarantini, João Marcelo, Claudir (Newmar) and Paulo Róbson; Paulo Rodrigues, Zé Carlos and Bobô (Osmar); Gil, Charles and Marquinhos. Head coach: Evaristo de Macedo.

== Final standings ==
Pos	Team	Pld	W	D	L	GF	GA	GD	EP	Pts
1	Bahia	29	13	11	5	33	23	+10	4	54
2	Internacional	29	12	13	4	40	26	+14	6	55
3	Fluminense	27	10	9	8	27	21	+6	3	42
4	Grêmio	27	10	9	8	27	24	+3	2	41
5	Vasco da Gama	25	14	8	3	36	16	+20	7	57
6	Flamengo	25	11	8	6	32	20	+12	3	44
7	Sport	25	9	10	6	21	21	0	6	43
8	Cruzeiro	25	8	10	7	26	23	+3	1	35
9	Portuguesa	23	12	5	6	28	21	+7	2	43
10	Atlético Mineiro	23	8	10	5	22	22	0	6	40
11	São Paulo	23	9	8	6	21	18	+3	4	39
12	Coritiba	23	8	7	8	20	17	+3	5	36
13	Goiás	23	5	11	7	21	21	0	8	34
14	Guarani	23	7	9	7	20	22	−2	2	32
15	Corinthians	23	6	9	8	21	22	−1	5	32
16	Palmeiras	23	7	7	9	21	22	−1	3	31
17	Santos	23	7	7	9	19	25	−6	3	31
18	Botafogo	23	7	7	9	17	22	−5	3	31
19	Atlético Paranaense	23	5	11	7	18	17	+1	5	31
20	Vitória	23	7	6	10	21	30	−9	3	30
21	Bangu	23	4	10	9	15	22	−7	6	28
22	Santa Cruz	23	5	7	11	19	28	−9	5	27
23	Criciúma	23	1	8	14	12	34	−22	3	14
24	América-RJ	23	2	6	15	11	31	−20	1	13
