= Newmar =

Newmar is a given name and surname. Notable people with the name include:

- Julie Newmar (born 1933), American actress
- Newmar José Sackis (born 1961), Brazilian footballer

Other

- Newmar is the name of a subsidiary of Winnebago Industries, Inc. an American manufacturer of motorhomes, a type of recreational vehicle (RV).
