= Paulo Rodrigues (footballer, born 1960) =

Brazilian footballer

Personal information
- Full name: Paulo Rodrigues Barcelos
- Date of birth: 10 May 1960 (age 66)
- Place of birth: Uberaba, Brazil
- Height: 1.86 m (6 ft 1 in)
- Position: Midfielder

Youth career
- Nacional de Uberaba

Senior career*
Years	Team	Apps	(Gls)
1981–1985	Nacional de Uberaba		
1983	→ América Mineiro (loan)		
1987–1988	Botafogo-SP		
1988–1992	Bahia		
1993	Bragantino		
1993	São Caetano		
1993–1995	Verdy Kawasaki	3	(0)
- * Club domestic league appearances and goals

Paulo Rodrigues Barcelos (born 10 May 1960) is a Brazilian former professional footballer who played as a midfielder.

== Career ==
Born in Uberaba, Paulo Rodrigues began his career in the youth sectors at Nacional. He had spells at América-MG and Botafogo-SP, but it was in 1988 that he gained national relevance, being a highlight of Brazilian champion Bahia alongside Bobô, and winning the Silver Ball that season.

In September 1993, Paulo joined Japanese J1 League club Verdy Kawasaki. However, he could not play at all in the match in 1993 season. Verdy won the J League in 1993. In March 1994, he debuted as defender against Bellmare Hiratsuka in opening match in 1994 season. Although he played three matches in March, he could not play at all in the match from April. He left the club in July 1994.

In April 2020, the player auctioned off the trophy he received at the Silver Ball in favor of the victims of COVID-19.

== Career statistics ==
Appearances and goals by club, season and competition
Club	Season	League			Emperor's Cup		J.League Cup		Total	
Club	Season	Division	Apps	Goals	Apps	Goals	Apps	Goals	Apps	Goals
Verdy Kawasaki	1993	J1 League	0	0	0	0	0	0	0	0
Verdy Kawasaki	1994	J1 League	3	0	0	0	0	0	3	0
Total			3	0	0	0	0	0	3	0

== Honours ==
Bahia

- Campeonato Brasileiro: 1988
- Campeonato Baiano: 1988, 1991

Tokyo Verdy

- J.League: 1993, 1994
- J.League Cup: 1994

Individual

- 1988 Bola de Prata
