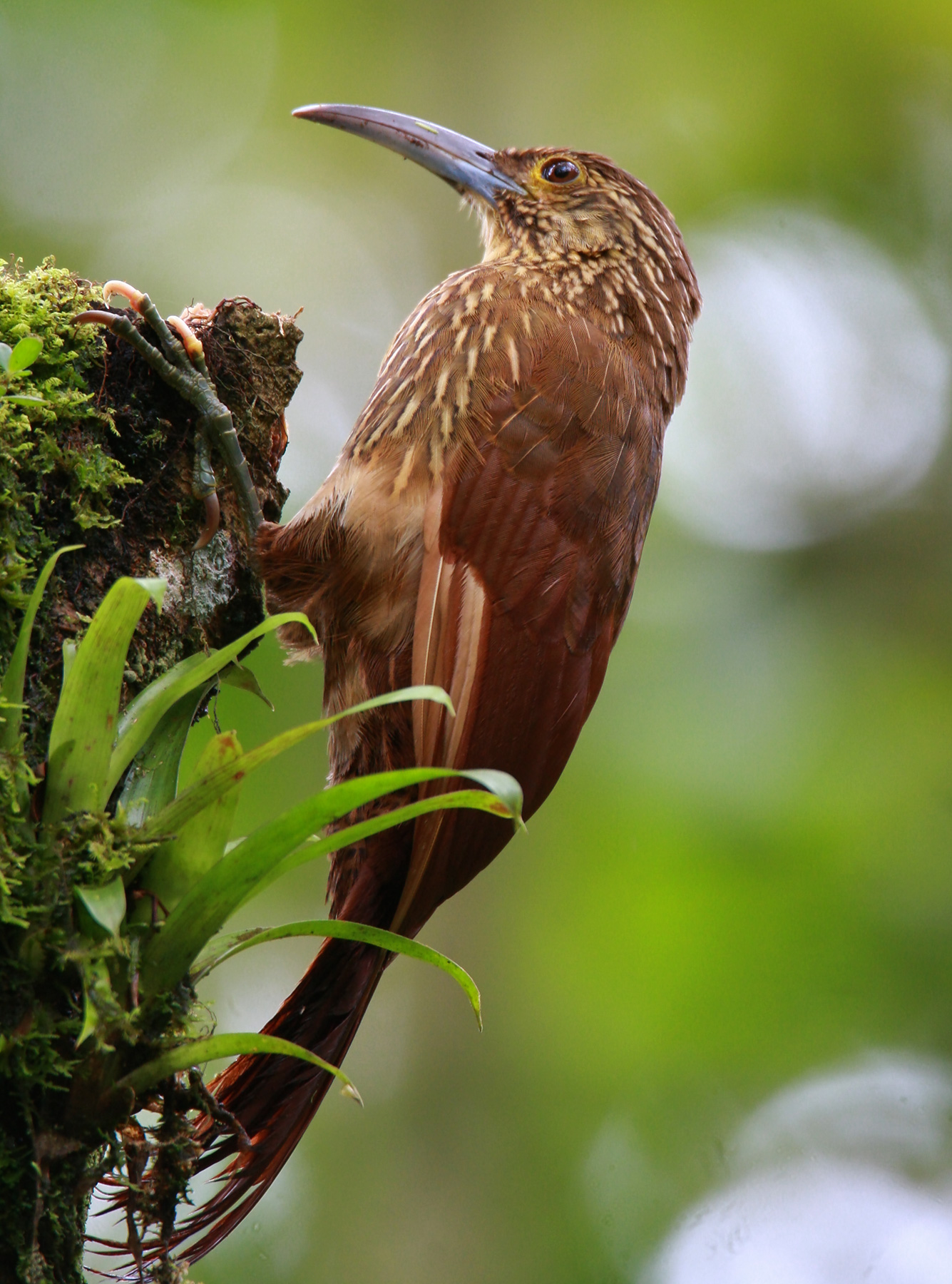

Conservation status
- Least Concern (IUCN 3.1)

Scientific classification
- Kingdom: Animalia
- Phylum: Chordata
- Class: Aves
- Order: Passeriformes
- Family: Furnariidae
- Genus: Xiphocolaptes
- Species: X. promeropirhynchus

Binomial name
- Xiphocolaptes promeropirhynchus (Lesson, 1840)

= Strong-billed woodcreeper =

Species of bird

The strong-billed woodcreeper (Xiphocolaptes promeropirhynchus) is a species of bird in the subfamily Dendrocolaptinae of the ovenbird family Furnariidae. It is found in Belize, Bolivia, Brazil, Colombia, Costa Rica, Ecuador, El Salvador, Guatemala, Guyana, Honduras, Mexico, Nicaragua, Panama, Peru, and Venezuela.

== Taxonomy and systematics ==
The strong-billed woodcreeper's taxonomy is unsettled. The International Ornithological Committee (IOC) assigns it these 23 subspecies:

- X. p. omiltemensis Nelson, 1903
- X. p. sclateri Ridgway, 1890
- X. p. emigrans Sclater, PL & Salvin, 1859
- X. p. costaricensis Ridgway, 1889
- X. p. panamensis Griscom, 1927
- X. p. rostratus Todd, 1917
- X. p. sanctaemartae Hellmayr, 1925
- X. p. virgatus Ridgway, 1890
- X. p. macarenae Blake, 1959
- X. p. promeropirhynchus (Lesson, 1840)
- X. p. procerus Cabanis & Heine, 1860
- X. p. tenebrosus Zimmer, JT & Phelps, WH, 1948
- X. p. neblinae Phelps, WH & Phelps, WH Jr, 1955
- X. p. crassirostris Taczanowski & Berlepsch, 1885
- X. p. compressirostris Taczanowski, 1882
- X. p. phaeopygus Berlepsch & Stolzmann, 1896
- X. p. solivagus Bond, J, 1950
- X. p. lineatocephalus (Gray, GR, 1847)
- X. p. orenocensis Berlepsch & Hartert, EJO, 1902
- X. p. berlepschi Snethlage, E, 1908
- X. p. paraensis Pinto, 1945
- X. p. obsoletus Todd, 1917
- X. p. carajaensis Cardoso da Silva, Novaes & Oren, 2002

The Clements taxonomy and BirdLife International's Handbook of the Birds of the World add two others, X. p. ignotus (Ridgway, 1890) and X. p. fortis (Heine, 1860) and list the subspecies in a somewhat different linear sequence than the IOC. X. p. fortis is known from a single specimen that was collected at an unknown location. The IOC apparently includes X. p. ignotus within X. p. promeropirhynchus.

The five Middle American subspecies (X. p. omiltemensis through X. p. panamensis in the above list) have been treated as a separate species. Similarly, the orenocensis group (X. p. solivagus and X. p. orenocensis through X. p. carajaensis in the list) has also been treated as a separate species. "Clearly, a thorough analysis is required."

This article follows the IOC 23-subspecies model.

== Description ==
The strong-billed woodcreeper one of the largest members of the ovenbird family and is the heaviest woodcreeper, though the slender long-billed woodcreeper (Nasica longirostris) is longer and the great rufous woodcreeper (Xiphocolaptes major) is larger overall. The strong-billed is 28 to 31.5 cm (11 to 12 in) long. Weights range between 103 and 144 g (3.6 and 5.1 oz). The sexes have the same plumage. Adults of the nominate subspecies X. p. promeropirhynchus have a dark brown crown and nape with buff streaks. Most of the rest of their face is dusky, with buffy lores, supercilium, "moustache", and throat stripe. Their back, scapulars, and wing coverts are brown with faint buff streaks on the shoulder. Their lower back is russet that darkens to the rufous chestnut rump. The tail is dark chestnut with paler feather shafts. Their flight feathers are tawny brown with dusky tips and rufous chestnut inner webs. Their throat is plain buffy. Their breast and flanks are brownish and their belly and undertail coverts are tawny cinnamon with small dark spots or bars. The breast and belly have narrow buffy streaks. Their bill is long, stout, and somewhat decurved; its color ranges from gray to black. Their iris is dark brown, amber, or red and their legs and feet bluish gray, green, or grayish black. Juveniles have a deeper overall color than adults, with ochre tips on the wing coverts and paler streaks on the crown and breast.

The other subspecies of the strong-billed woodcreeper differ from the nominate thus:

- X. p. omiltemensis, smaller, paler overall with paler streaking
- X. p. sclateri, smaller, with a darker throat stripe and stronger streaking
- X. p. emigrans, smaller, paler, with a weaker throat stripe
- X. p. costaricensis, smaller, paler overall with paler streaking
- X. p. panamensis, smaller, paler overall with paler streaking
- X. p. rostratus, more rufescent overall with a heavier bill
- X. p. sanctaemartae, no streaking on the back, no barring on the belly, limited streaking on the breast, and longer bill
- X. p. virgatus, larger and darker
- X. p. macarenae, darker upper body, paler throat, no streaks on the back
- X. p. procerus, no streaking on the back, no barring on the belly, and limited streaking on the breast
- X. p. tenebrosus, darker upperparts and a heavily streaked throat
- X. p. neblinae, darker upperparts and a heavily streaked throat
- X. p. crassirostris, smaller, darker crown, and bolder markings on the face
- X. p. compressirostris, olive of back continues onto rump, finer streaks on crown, heavy streaks on throat, dusky streaks on face
- X. p. phaeopygus, olive of back continues onto rump, almost no streaks on crown, heavy streaks on throat, dusky streaks on face
- X. p. solivagus, larger, slightly more rufescent, paler and slightly larger bill
- X. p. lineatocephalus, overall more brown with chestnut rump and tail, darker crown with buffy whitish streaks, whitish barring with black borders on throat, and blackish barring on belly
- X. p. orenocensis, larger, more rufescent, weak spotting on belly, and larger and paler bill
- X. p. berlepschi, larger, much more rufescent, and larger and paler bill
- X. p. paraensis, larger, more rufescent, black crown, bolder streaks on back and bars on belly, and larger and paler bill
- X. p. obsoletus, larger, more rufescent, paler and slightly larger bill
- X. p. carajaensis, larger, more rufescent but paler underparts, narrow dense streaking, and larger and paler bill

== Distribution and habitat ==
The subspecies of the strong-billed woodcreeper are found thus:

- X. p. omiltemensis, the Sierra Madre del Sur of southwestern Mexico's Guerrero state
- X. p. sclateri, southeastern Mexico's states of San Luis Potosí, Veracruz, and Oaxaca
- X. p. emigrans, from Chiapas in southern Mexico south through Belize, Guatemala, Honduras, and El Salvador into north central Nicaragua
- X. p. costaricensis, central Costa Rica and western Panama
- X. p. panamensis, the Pacific slope of southern Panama
- X. p. rostratus, the northern Colombian departments of Córdoba and Bolívar
- X. p. sanctaemartae, northern Colombia's Sierra Nevada de Santa Marta
- X. p. virgatus, Colombia's Central Andes and Magdalena River valley
- X. p. macarenae, Colombia's Serranía de la Macarena and Central Andes
- X. p. promeropirhynchus, Colombia's Eastern Andes, western Venezuela's Andes, and Ecuador's northern Andes
- X. p. procerus, northern and central Venezuela
- X. p. tenebrosus, the tepuis of southeastern Venezuela and adjoining Guyana
- X. p. neblinae, the tepuis of southern Venezuela and adjoining northwestern Brazil
- X. p. crassirostris, the foothills of the Andes in southwestern Ecuador and northwestern Peru
- X. p. compressirostris, the Andes of northern Peru
- X. p. phaeopygus, the Andes of central Peru's Department of Junín
- X. p. solivagus, eastern Peru's departments of Junín and Huánuco
- X. p. lineatocephalus, the Andes from southeastern Peru's Department of Cuzco to central Bolivia
- X. p. orenocensis, lowlands of eastern Colombia, Ecuador, and Peru; western Venezuela; and northwestern Brazil
- X. p. berlepschi, the Amazon Basin of western Brazil south of the upper Amazon River (Rio Solimões) east to the Rio Madeira
- X. p. paraensis, Amazonian Brazil south of the Amazon and Rio Madeira into northern Mato Grosso state
- X. p. obsoletus, northern and eastern Bolivia
- X. p. carajaensis, Amazonian Brazil south of the Amazon between the Zingu and Tocantins/Araguaia rivers

The strong-billed woodcreeper inhabits a very wide variety of temperate, subtropical, and tropical forested landscapes. It favors the interior of primary forest and also occurs at its edges, in semi-open forest, and in mature secondary forest. It mostly shuns fragmented forests, plantations, and young secondary forest. The subspecies found in Middle America occur in montane forest, principally oak and pine-oak associations, but also in lowland rainforest and pine-dominated ridges. The subspecies of the Amazon Basin inhabit humid forest, principally terra firme and várzea and only rarely gallery and permanently flooded forest. The remaining subspecies in the northern and central Andes, the coast ranges, and the tepuis inhabit humid evergreen forest, cloudforest, and also dryer forest.

In elevation the species as a whole ranges from sea level to 3,500 m (11,500 ft). In Mexico it occurs between 1,500 and 3,500 m (4,900 and 11,500 ft), in northern Central America mostly from 1,200 to 2,850 m (3,900 to 9,400 ft) but also in lowlands, in southern Central America between 500 and 1,700 m (1,600 and 5,600 ft), in Colombia as low as 100 m (330 ft) but mostly above 1,500 m (4,900 ft), in Venezuela from near sea level to 2,800 m (9,200 ft) but mostly above 400 m (1,300 ft), in eastern Ecuador up to 600 m (2,000 ft) and in the Andes between 1,000 and 3,000 m (3,300 and 9,800 ft), in Peru up to 2,850 m (9,400 ft), and in Guyana and Brazil only in lowlands.

== Behavior ==
=== Movement ===
The strong-billed woodcreeper is a year-round resident throughout its range.

=== Feeding ===
The strong-billed woodcreeper feeds mostly on arthropods but its diet also includes small vertebrates. It sometimes follows army ant swarms, where it forages on the ground or on low trunks to capture prey disturbed by the ants. Away from ant swarms it forages as high as the subcanopy. It creeps up trunks and along limbs and probes foliage, bark, dead wood, leaf litter, bromeliads, and epiphytes; it less often sallies out to glean from foliage. It typically forages singly or in pairs; sources differ about how frequently it joins mixed-species feeding flocks, stating variously from seldom to often.

=== Breeding ===
The strong-billed woodcreeper appears to be socially monogamous; both members of a pair contribute to nest building and caring for young. The species' nesting season varies widely across its range, for instance March to May in northern Middle America and northern South America and including October in Brazil. Only three nests are known; all were in nest boxes whose floor the pair lined with leaves. The clutch size at them was two to three. The incubation period has not been determined; fledging occurs about three to four weeks after hatch.

=== Vocalization ===
The strong-billed woodcreeper sings mostly at dawn and dusk. Its vocalizations vary among the populations, but very generally are "a long, ringing, descending sequence of 4-8 or 3-10 disyllabic whistles". In northern Central America it makes "a thin, nasal, rising teeeeuuuuuWEEEK!" that falls in volume during a long series. In Costa Rica it "repeats a loud KEW-WEE about 10 times." In Ecuador it is "a series of 3-5 paired notes...'pt-teeu, pt-teeu, pt-teeu, pt-teeu." In Brazil it is a "high, loud, descending series...'weetju weetju...' notes."

"A comprehensive review of variation in song across populations of Strong-billed Woodcreeper has not been attempted."

== Status ==
The IUCN has assessed the strong-billed woodcreeper as being of Least Concern. It has a very large range and an estimated population between 50,000 and 500,000 mature individuals. However, the population is believed to be decreasing. No immediate threats have been identified. "Strong-billed Woodcreeper faces heightened risk because of its specialization on threatened tropical highland forest habitats...The primary threat to this species is loss of this habitat type due to unsustainable logging, wood harvesting, clearing for agriculture, livestock grazing, and urbanization."
