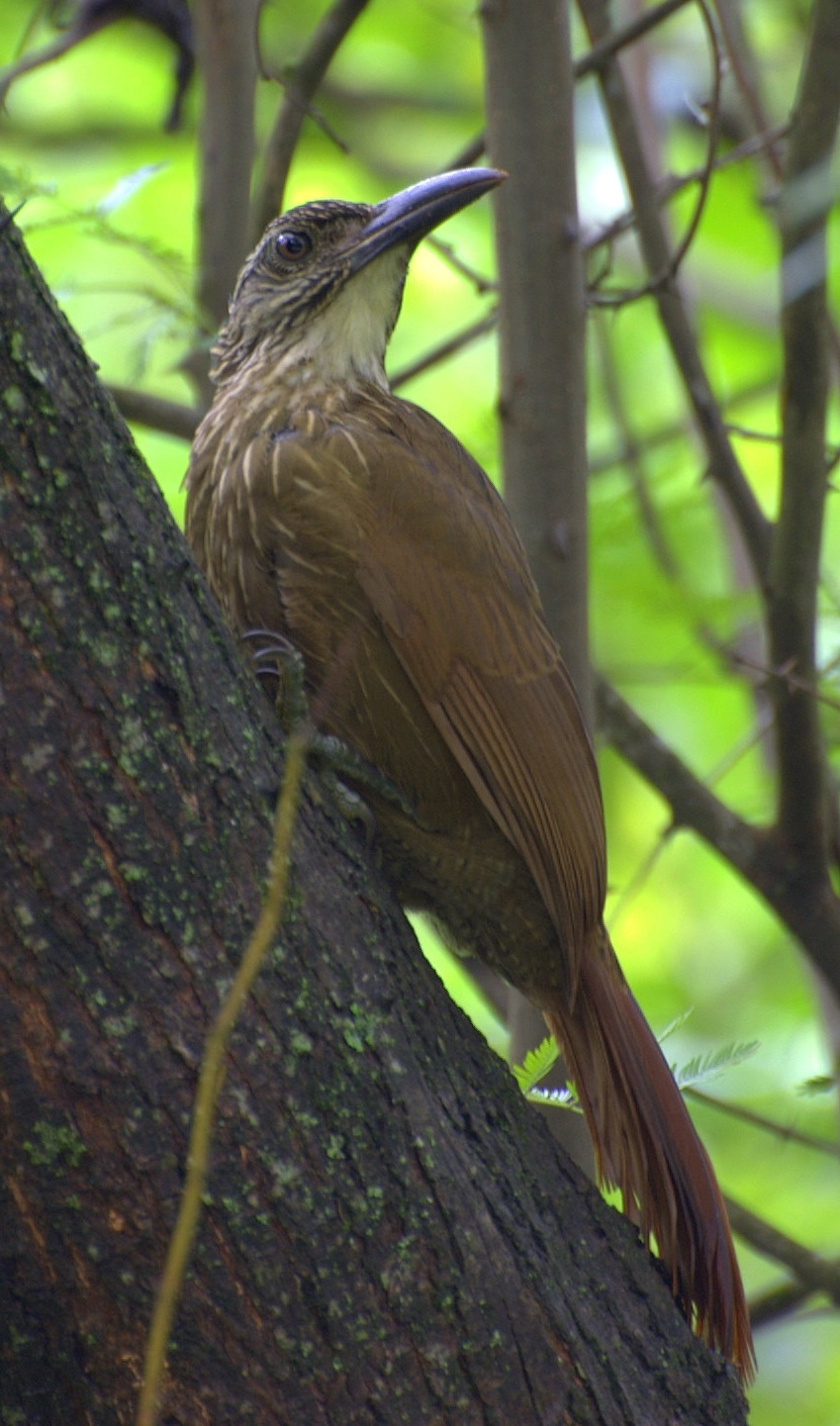

Conservation status
- Least Concern (IUCN 3.1)

Scientific classification
- Kingdom: Animalia
- Phylum: Chordata
- Class: Aves
- Order: Passeriformes
- Family: Furnariidae
- Genus: Xiphocolaptes
- Species: X. albicollis

Binomial name
- Xiphocolaptes albicollis (Vieillot, 1818)

= White-throated woodcreeper =

Species of bird

The white-throated woodcreeper (Xiphocolaptes albicollis) is a species of bird in the subfamily Dendrocolaptinae of the ovenbird family Furnariidae. It is found in Argentina, Brazil, and Paraguay.

== Taxonomy and systematics ==
The white-throated woodcreeper has three subspecies, the nominate X. a. albicollis (Vieillot, 1818), X. a. bahiae (Cory, 1919), and X. a. villanovae (Lima, 1920). X. a. villanovae has previously been treated as a separate species and also as a subspecies of the moustached woodcreeper (X. falcirostris). Subspecies franciscanus of the moustached woodcreeper has sometimes been treated as a subspecies of the white-throated.

== Description ==
The white-throated woodcreeper is one of the largest members of its subfamily. It is heavy-bodied, with a shortish tail and a long decurved bill. It is 27.5 to 33 cm (11 to 13 in) long and weighs 110 to 130 g (3.9 to 4.6 oz). The sexes have the same plumage. Adults of the nominate subspecies have a dark face with a whitish to pale buff supercilium and moustachial stripe. They have a dark stripe behind the eye and a blackish one on the cheek. Their forehead, crown, and nape are black with strong cream to buff streaks on the crown. Their back and wing coverts are brownish olive and their rump rusty chestnut; the upper back has faint light streaks. Their flight feathers have light chestnut inner webs, dark brown outer webs, and dusky tips. Their tail is dark chestnut with darker shafts on the feathers. Their throat is white to buffy white and their underparts olive-brown to tawny. Their breast and sides have bold pale buff to whitish streaks with dark edges, and their belly, thighs, and undertail coverts have distinct darker bars. Their iris is red to brown, their bill black (sometimes with a horn-colored mandible), and their legs and feet highly variable in color but generally dark. Juveniles are similar to adults with a shorter bill and rusty-yellow spots on the crown.

Subspecies X. a. villanovae is overall paler than the nominate, with a dark brown crown, a more obvious supercilium, weaker barring on the belly, and a shorter bill. X. a. bahiae is also paler than the nominate, but browner. Its crown is dark brown with tawny-rufous streaks, its breast streaks are without dark edges, and it has a few dusky spots instead of barring on the belly.

== Distribution and habitat ==
The nominate subspecies of the white-throated woodcreeper is found in southeastern and southern Brazil from southern Bahia south into Rio Grande do Sul, through eastern Paraguay, and into Argentina as far as northeastern Corrientes Province. Subspecies X. a. villanovae is found only in a small area around Senhor do Bonfim in the northeast of Brazil's Bahia state. X. a. bahiae is found slightly more extensively in the Chapada Diamantina of eastern and central Bahia. The species is primarily a bird of the humid Atlantic Forest and also occurs in semi-deciduous forest and in gallery forest in cerrado. It favors the interior of primary forest but regularly occurs at its edges and in mature secondary forest. In elevation it is mostly found below 1,500 m (4,900 ft) but occurs as high as 2,000 m (6,600 ft).

== Behavior ==
=== Movement ===
The white-throated woodcreeper is apparently a year-round resident throughout its range even in the southernmost parts of it.

=== Feeding ===
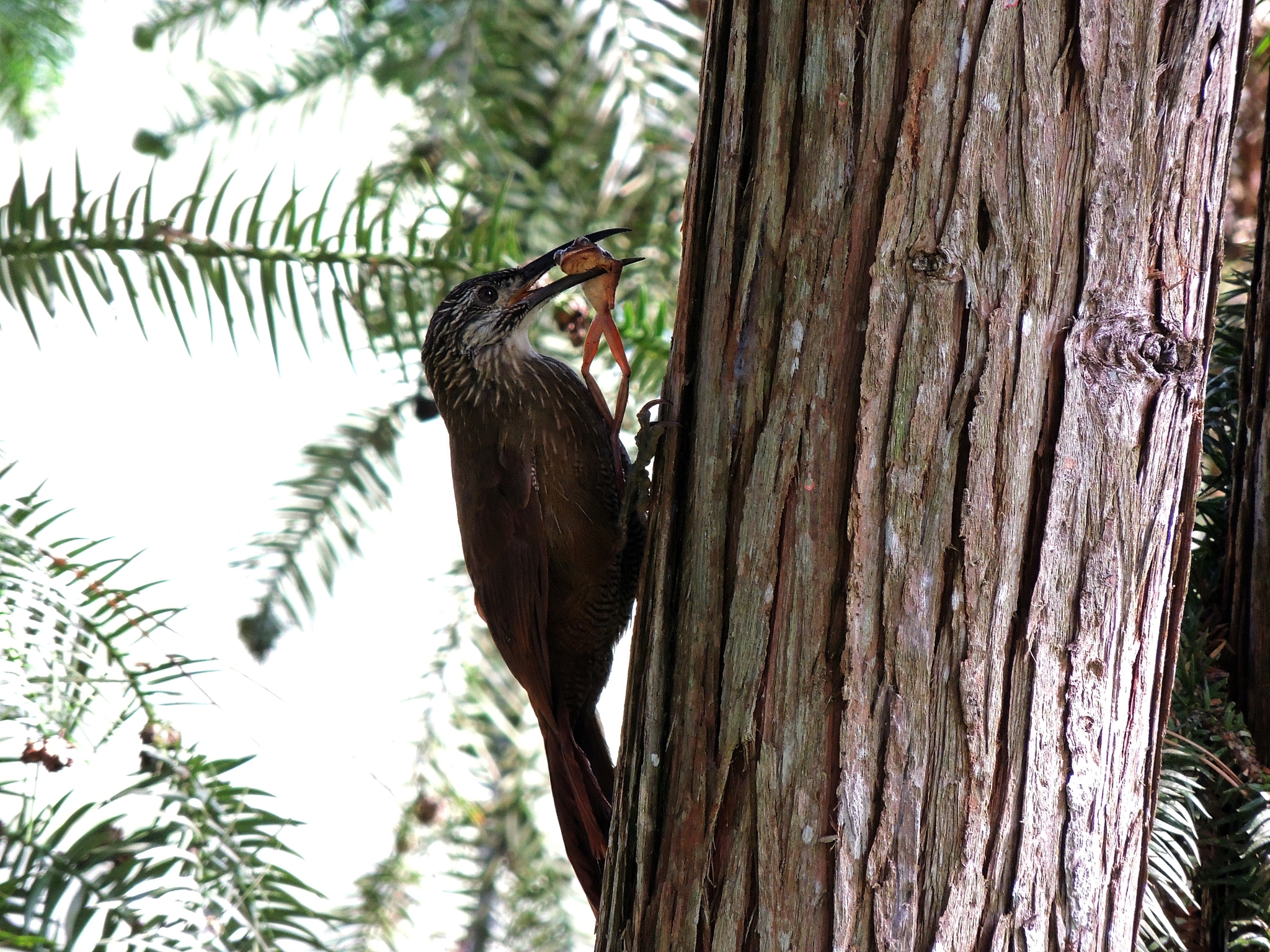
An individual of the species preying on a frog in Santa Catarina, Brazil.

The white-throated woodcreeper's diet is mostly arthropods but it also feeds on snails, bird eggs, and small vertebrates. It usually forages singly but sometimes in pairs. It sometimes follows army ant swarms and sometimes joins mixed-species feeding flocks. It mostly forages from near the ground to the forest mid-level but does extend to the canopy. It hitches along trunks and branches, usually gleaning prey but also flaking bark and pecking rotten wood. It also often probes bromeliads.

=== Breeding ===
The white-throated woodcreeper breeds between September and November. It nests in a natural cavity in a tree to which it adds material. The clutch size is two to four eggs. The incubation period is about 17 days and fledging occurs 18 to 22 days after hatch. Both parents incubate the eggs and care for nestlings.

=== Vocalization ===
The white-throated woodcreeper sings mostly at dawn and dusk, sometimes late into the evening. Both sexes sing. Its song is a "slow, descending series of 4-6 high, sharp, double-noted whistles, like 'witjuu witjuu - -'." The song has also been put into words as "reenht-wi-KEER wi-KEER wi-KEER wi-KEER wi-KEER wi-KEER wick". Its calls include "snarls, including rising 'wheee', also 2-note call...'cha-EESK', 'wheee-chuck' or 'eweh-wet'."

== Status ==
The IUCN has assessed the white-throated woodcreeper as being of Least Concern. It has a large range, and though its population size is not known it is believed to be stable. No immediate threats have been identified. It is thought uncommon to fairly common in much of its range and common at some Brazilian sites. It is thought "to be only moderately sensitive to human disturbance, which may explain continued presence in relatively small fragments, older second growth and selectively logged sites."
