= Osmers =

Osmers is a surname. Notable people with the surname include:

- Frank C. Osmers Jr. (1907–1977), American politician
- Harm Osmers (born 1985), German football referee
- John Osmers (1935–2021), New Zealand anti-apartheid activist and Anglican Bishop of Eastern Zambia

== See also ==
- Osmer, a list of people with the surname or given name
