= Dulcídio Wanderley Boschilia =

Brazilian football referee

- Born: 4 January 1938; São Paulo, Brazil
- Died: 14 May 1998 (aged 60); São Paulo, Brazil

Domestic
| Years | League | Role |
| 1966–1990 | FPF, CBF | Referee |

Dulcídio Wanderley Boschilia (4 January 1938 – 14 May 1998), was a Brazilian football referee.

== Referee career ==
A referee since 1966, Boschilia became famous for his referees in the final of the 1977 Campeonato Paulista, leading to the expulsion of Rui Rei from Ponte Preta. Because he was a military police officer, he went to games armed, and in 1979 he attacked a fan who invaded the pitch to complain about a penalty given against EC Noroeste. He refereed the finals of the 1975 and 1988 Campeonato Brasileiro. Also refereed the final of the 1987 Campeonato Paulista just a few days after suffering a serious car accident, which killed his wife. He ended his career in 1990, aged over 50.

== Personal life ==
He declared himself a supporter of São Paulo FC in 1975, due to the friendship he had with José Poy. Even so, it had the credibility of the other teams in São Paulo due to the quality of its referees. He is the uncle of player Gabriel Boschilia and of the assistant referee Bruno Boschilia.

== Death ==
Dulcídio died of kidney disease on 14 May 1998.
