= Bobô (footballer, born 1962) =

Brazilian footballer

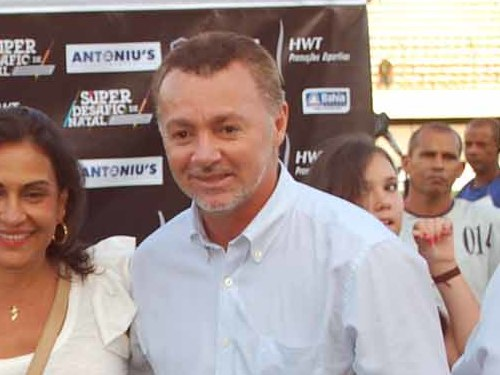
- Bobô in 2011

Personal information
- Full name: Raimundo Nonato Tavares da Silva
- Date of birth: November 28, 1962 (age 63)
- Place of birth: Senhor do Bonfim, Brazil
- Height: 1.75 m (5 ft 9 in)
- Position: Right midfielder

Youth career
- Bahia Jovem
- Catuense

Senior career*
Years	Team	Apps	(Gls)
1982–1984	Catuense		
1985–1989	Bahia		
1989–1990	São Paulo	18	(3)
1990–1991	Flamengo		
1991–1992	Fluminense		
1993	Corinthians		
1994	Internacional		
1995	Catuense		
1995–1997	Bahia		

International career
1989	Brazil	3	(0)

Managerial career
- 2002–2003: Bahia (interim)
- * Club domestic league appearances and goals

Raimundo Nonato Tavares da Silva, commonly known by the nickname Bobô (born November 28, 1962), is a retired Brazilian professional football right midfielder and head coach, who played for several Campeonato Brasileiro Série A clubs.

== Playing career ==
Born on November 28, 1962, in Senhor do Bonfim, before becoming a professional player, Bobô played for local amateur club Bahia Jovem, then he joined Catuense's youth squad after the club's head coach, João Correia, observed him playing. In 1982, he started his professional career playing for Catuense, where he stayed through 1984. In 1985, he joined Bahia, where he won three times the Campeonato Baiano (in 1986, in 1987 and in 1988), and also won the 1988 Campeonato Brasileiro Série A, scoring six goals in the competition, including two in the first leg of the final, and winning that year's Placar magazine's Bola de Prata award. He stayed at Bahia until 1989, when he was signed by São Paulo for US$1 million. He scored three goals in the 18 Campeonato Brasileiro Série A games that he played for São Paulo, winning the 1989 Bola de Prata, and that year's Campeonato Paulista. After leaving São Paulo during the 1990 season, he played for Flamengo, winning that season's Copa do Brasil, joining Flamengo's rivals, Fluminense in 1991, leaving the club in 1992, and playing for Corinthians and Internacional in 1993. In 1994, due to a judicial dispute with Corinthians, he ended the year without playing a game, but in the following year, he resumed playing, after returning to Catuense. In the same year, he returned to Bahia, retiring in 1997. Bobô played his farewell game on July 1, 1997, in a friendly tournament game between Bahia and Palmeiras.

=== National team ===
Bobô played three games for the Brazil national team in 1989, the first against Paraguay on April 12, while the other two against Peru, on May 10 and on May 24, winning the first two games, the results were, respectively 2–0, 4–1 and 1–1.

== Non-playing career ==
After retiring from playing football, Bobô worked as a sports commentator for Rede Bandeirantes. He worked as Bahia's youth squad head coach in 2000, then was promoted as the main team's head coach in 2002, winning the Campeonato do Nordeste in that year. He resigned as Bahia's head coach in April 2003, after his club was defeated by Paraná 3–1, a result that left the club in Campeonato Brasileiro Série A's penultimate position. He was appointed as the club's director of football on March 4, 2005, resigning from the job in July of the same year. In 2006, Bobô worked as the host of Rede Bandeirantes' sports news show Esporte Total Bahia, before being appointed in December by Bahia state's Governor Jaques Wagner as general director of SUDESB (Superintendência dos Desportos do Estado da Bahia, meaning Bahia State's Sports Superintendency).

== Honours ==
=== Player ===
==== Club ====
Bahia

- Campeonato Baiano: 1986, 1987, 1988
- Campeonato Brasileiro Série A: 1988

São Paulo

- Campeonato Paulista: 1989

Flamengo

- Copa do Brasil: 1990

Fluminense

- Taça Guanabara: 1991, 1993

Internacional

- Campeonato Gaúcho: 1994

==== Individual ====
- Bola de Prata: 1988, 1989

=== Manager ===
Bahia

- Copa do Nordeste: 2002
