= 1975 Campeonato Brasileiro Série A =

Campeonato Brasileiro Série A
- Season: 1975
- Champions: Internacional (1st title)
- Copa Libertadores de América: Internacional; Cruzeiro
- Top goalscorer: Flávio Minuano (Internacional) - 16 goals
- Biggest home win: Internacional 5-0 Sergipe (September 17, 1975)
- Biggest away win: Vitória 0-5 Internacional (August 23, 1975)
- Highest scoring: Moto Club 4-3 Paysandu (August 20, 1975); Fluminense 5-2 Atlético Mineiro (August 30, 1975); América-RN 3-4 São Paulo (August 31, 1975); América-RJ 5-2 Atlético-PR (September 13, 1975); Campinense 2-5 Bahia (September 28, 1975)
- Average attendance: 15,985

The 1975 Campeonato Brasileiro Série A (officially the I Copa Brasil) was the 20th edition of the Campeonato Brasileiro Série A.

== Overview ==
It was performed by 42 teams, and Internacional won the championship. It was divided into four phases:

- In the First phase, the 42 teams were divided into two groups of eleven teams and two groups of ten. The teams played once against the teams of the other group that had an equal number of team to theirs, meaning that the teams of Group A would face the teams of Group B and the teams of Group C would face the ones of Group D. No teams were eliminated, and victories by two goals of difference or more were worth three points.
- In the Second phase, the teams were divided into six groups. Two group comprised ten teams, with Group 1 receiving the top five teams in Group A and B, and Group 2 receiving the top five teams in groups C and D. The teams of those group played once against those of the other, and the six best teams in each group qualified to the third phase. The Groups 3, 4, 5 and 6 received the teams that couldn't qualify to the Groups 1 and 2, and in each one of them, the teams played against the teams of their own groups once, and only one team in each group qualified to the Third phase. As in the previous round, victories by two goals of difference or more were worth three points.
- In the third phase, The 16 teams were divided into two group of eight teams, and each team played against the others of its own group. The first two teams in each group qualified to the Semifinals, as in the previous rounds, victories by two goals of difference or more were worth three points.
- Both semifinals and finals were disputed in the form of a one-leg knock out tournament.

== First phase ==
=== Group A ===
Pos	Team	Pld	W	D	L	GF	GA	GD	BP	Pts	Qualification
1	América-RJ	10	4	3	3	17	11	+6	4	15	Qualified to Group 1 on Second phase
2	Coritiba	10	5	2	3	10	5	+5	2	14	Qualified to Group 1 on Second phase
3	Remo	10	4	5	1	11	8	+3	1	14	Qualified to Group 1 on Second phase
4	Atlético Mineiro	10	4	4	2	11	9	+2	2	14	Qualified to Group 1 on Second phase
5	Palmeiras	10	3	5	2	12	9	+3	3	14	Qualified to Group 1 on Second phase
6	Fortaleza	10	3	5	2	8	7	+1	1	12	Qualified to Group 3 on Second phase
7	Botafogo	10	3	3	4	12	12	0	1	10	Qualified to Group 3 on Second phase
8	Comercial de Campo Grande	10	3	3	4	7	11	−4	1	10	Qualified to Group 3 on Second phase
9	Rio Negro	10	1	5	4	5	12	−7	1	8	Qualified to Group 3 on Second phase
10	Moto Club	10	1	2	7	9	29	−20	0	4	Qualified to Group 3 on Second phase

=== Group B ===
Pos	Team	Pld	W	D	L	GF	GA	GD	BP	Pts	Qualification
1	Cruzeiro	10	5	5	0	15	2	+13	4	19	Qualified to Group 1 on Second phase
2	Corinthians	10	5	4	1	10	3	+7	2	16	Qualified to Group 1 on Second phase
3	Fluminense	10	5	1	4	18	13	+5	4	15	Qualified to Group 1 on Second phase
4	Guarani	10	3	4	3	10	9	+1	3	13	Qualified to Group 1 on Second phase
5	Tiradentes	10	4	2	4	10	8	+2	2	12	Qualified to Group 1 on Second phase
6	Atlético-PR	10	3	2	5	18	19	−1	2	10	Qualified to Group 4 on Second phase
7	Ceará	10	3	2	5	6	10	−4	2	10	Qualified to Group 4 on Second phase
8	América-MG	10	1	7	2	6	9	−3	1	10	Qualified to Group 4 on Second phase
9	Paysandu	10	2	4	4	13	15	−2	1	9	Qualified to Group 4 on Second phase
10	Nacional-AM	10	1	6	3	7	14	−7	0	8	Qualified to Group 4 on Second phase

=== Group C ===
Pos	Team	Pld	W	D	L	GF	GA	GD	BP	Pts	Qualification
1	Flamengo	11	5	2	4	12	11	+1	2	14	Qualified to Group 2 on Second phase
2	Grêmio	11	2	7	2	11	9	+2	2	13	Qualified to Group 2 on Second phase
3	América-RN	11	4	3	4	18	17	+1	1	12	Qualified to Group 2 on Second phase
4	Figueirense	11	3	5	3	14	12	+2	1	12	Qualified to Group 2 on Second phase
5	Santa Cruz	11	3	5	3	14	12	+2	1	12	Qualified to Group 2 on Second phase
6	Goiânia	11	4	2	5	13	16	−3	1	11	Qualified to Group 5 on Second phase
7	Portuguesa	11	3	4	4	6	9	−3	0	10	Qualified to Group 5 on Second phase
8	Vitória	11	3	3	5	8	16	−8	1	10	Qualified to Group 5 on Second phase
9	Santos	11	2	3	6	8	15	−7	1	8	Qualified to Group 5 on Second phase
10	Sergipe	11	1	4	6	7	17	−10	0	6	Qualified to Group 5 on Second phase
11	Campinense	11	0	3	8	8	27	−19	0	3	Qualified to Group 5 on Second phase

=== Group D ===
Pos	Team	Pld	W	D	L	GF	GA	GD	BP	Pts	Qualification
1	Internacional	11	8	2	1	24	5	+19	5	23	Qualified to Group 2 on Second phase
2	São Paulo	11	7	4	0	19	8	+11	3	21	Qualified to Group 2 on Second phase
3	Vasco da Gama	11	6	3	2	19	10	+9	3	18	Qualified to Group 2 on Second phase
4	Goiás	11	4	7	0	16	7	+9	3	18	Qualified to Group 2 on Second phase
5	Sport	11	5	5	1	16	10	+6	2	17	Qualified to Group 2 on Second phase
6	Náutico	11	5	3	3	14	10	+4	2	15	Qualified to Group 6 on Second phase
7	CSA	11	5	2	4	10	10	0	1	13	Qualified to Group 6 on Second phase
8	Bahia	11	2	7	2	13	10	+3	2	13	Qualified to Group 6 on Second phase
9	CEUB	11	3	5	3	12	12	0	0	11	Qualified to Group 6 on Second phase
10	Desportiva	11	2	3	6	10	20	−10	0	7	Qualified to Group 6 on Second phase
11	Americano	11	3	0	8	8	17	−9	0	6	Qualified to Group 6 on Second phase

== Second phase ==
=== Group 1 ===
Pos	Team	Pld	W	D	L	GF	GA	GD	BP	Pts	Qualification
1	Fluminense	10	6	2	2	19	6	+13	5	19	Qualified to Third phase
2	Cruzeiro	10	6	3	1	12	5	+7	2	17	Qualified to Third phase
3	Corinthians	10	4	4	2	10	6	+4	1	13	Qualified to Third phase
4	América-RJ	10	4	3	3	10	10	0	1	12	Qualified to Third phase
5	Palmeiras	10	3	5	2	10	10	0	1	12	Qualified to Third phase
6	Guarani	10	2	7	1	8	7	+1	1	12	Qualified to Third phase
7	Remo	10	3	3	4	11	15	−4	2	11	
8	Atlético Mineiro	10	2	5	3	13	15	−2	1	10	
9	Coritiba	10	1	4	5	9	15	−6	1	7	
10	Tiradentes	10	2	3	5	7	15	−8	0	7	

=== Group 2 ===
Pos	Team	Pld	W	D	L	GF	GA	GD	BP	Pts	Qualification
1	Internacional	10	5	4	1	15	4	+11	5	19	Qualified to Third phase
2	Santa Cruz	10	5	4	1	12	6	+6	2	16	Qualified to Third phase
3	Flamengo	10	4	1	5	12	12	0	3	12	Qualified to Third phase
4	São Paulo	10	2	7	1	8	6	+2	1	12	Qualified to Third phase
5	Grêmio	10	3	3	4	16	14	+2	2	11	Qualified to Third phase
6	Sport	10	2	5	3	6	7	−1	1	10	Qualified to Third phase
7	Figueirense	10	2	5	3	11	13	−2	1	10	
8	Goiás	10	2	4	4	8	15	−7	1	9	
9	América-RN	10	2	2	6	10	19	−9	1	7	
10	Vasco da Gama	10	1	4	5	6	13	−7	0	6	

=== Group 3 ===
Pos	Team	Pld	W	D	L	GF	GA	GD	BP	Pts	Qualification
1	Botafogo	4	2	2	0	6	3	+3	1	7	Qualified to Third phase
2	Comercial de Campo Grande	4	2	1	1	7	6	+1	0	5	
3	Fortaleza	4	2	1	1	5	4	+1	0	5	
4	Rio Negro	4	1	1	2	4	6	−2	0	3	
5	Moto Club	4	0	1	3	4	7	−3	0	1	

=== Group 4 ===
Pos	Team	Pld	W	D	L	GF	GA	GD	BP	Pts	Qualification
1	Nacional-AM	4	2	2	0	6	3	+3	1	7	Qualified to Third phase
2	Atlético-PR	4	2	1	1	4	2	+2	1	6	
3	Ceará	4	1	1	2	2	5	−3	0	3	
4	América-MG	4	1	1	2	5	6	−1	0	3	
5	Paysandu	4	1	1	2	5	6	−1	0	3	

=== Group 5 ===
Pos	Team	Pld	W	D	L	GF	GA	GD	BP	Pts	Qualification
1	Portuguesa	5	4	1	0	14	2	+12	3	12	Qualified to Third phase
2	Santos	5	4	1	0	12	3	+9	3	12	
3	Goiânia	5	2	1	2	4	4	0	0	5	
4	Vitória	5	2	0	3	5	8	−3	1	5	
5	Sergipe	5	1	0	4	4	10	−6	1	3	
6	Campinense	5	0	1	4	5	17	−12	0	1	

=== Group 6 ===
Pos	Team	Pld	W	D	L	GF	GA	GD	BP	Pts	Qualification
1	Náutico	5	4	1	0	12	2	+10	4	13	Qualified to Third phase
2	Bahia	5	3	2	0	7	2	+5	1	9	
3	Desportiva	5	2	1	2	5	6	−1	1	6	
4	Americano	5	2	0	3	4	7	−3	1	5	
5	CEUB	5	1	1	3	4	8	−4	1	4	
6	CSA	5	0	1	4	2	9	−7	0	1	

== Third phase ==
=== Group 1 ===
Pos	Team	Pld	W	D	L	GF	GA	GD	BP	Pts	Qualification
1	Fluminense	7	5	1	1	14	5	+9	3	14	Qualified to Semifinals
2	Cruzeiro	7	3	2	2	9	5	+4	3	11	Qualified to Semifinals
3	América-RJ	7	3	3	1	8	6	+2	1	10	
4	Palmeiras	7	3	1	3	10	8	+2	3	10	
5	Corinthians	7	4	1	2	9	8	+1	0	9	
6	Guarani	7	3	1	3	9	9	0	2	9	
7	Botafogo	7	2	1	4	6	10	−4	1	6	
8	Nacional-AM	7	0	0	7	1	17	−16	0	0	

=== Group 2 ===
Pos	Team	Pld	W	D	L	GF	GA	GD	BP	Pts	Qualification
1	Santa Cruz	7	5	1	1	14	6	+8	3	14	Qualified to Semifinals
2	Internacional	7	4	2	1	9	3	+6	2	12	Qualified to Semifinals
3	Flamengo	7	4	2	1	10	5	+5	2	12	
4	São Paulo	7	2	3	2	8	7	+1	1	8	
5	Portuguesa	7	2	3	2	8	10	−2	1	8	
6	Sport	7	1	3	3	7	11	−4	0	5	
7	Grêmio	7	1	3	3	5	7	−2	0	5	
8	Náutico	7	0	1	6	4	16	−12	0	1	

== Semifinals ==
7 December 1975

Fluminense (Rio de Janeiro (state))	0 – 2	(Rio Grande do Sul) Internacional
		Lula 33'; Paulo César 74'

Maracanã, Rio de Janeiro (RJ)
Attendance: 97,908
Referee: (São Paulo (state)) Dulcídio Boschilia

7 December 1975

Santa Cruz (Pernambuco)	2 – 3	(Minas Gerais) Cruzeiro
Fumanchu 32', 73'		Zé Carlos 43'; Palhinha 47', 90'

Arruda, Recife (PE)
Attendance: 38,118
Referee: (São Paulo (state)) Romualdo Arppi Filho

== Finals ==
14 December 1975

Internacional (Rio Grande do Sul)	1 – 0	(Minas Gerais) Cruzeiro
Figueroa 56'

Beira-Rio, Porto Alegre (RS)
Attendance: 82,568
Referee: (São Paulo (state)) Dulcídio Boschilia

== Final standings ==
Pos	Team	Pld	W	D	L	GF	GA	GD	BP	Pts
1	Internacional	30	19	8	3	51	12	+39	12	58
2	Cruzeiro	29	15	10	4	39	15	+24	9	49
3	Fluminense	28	16	4	8	51	26	+25	12	48
4	Santa Cruz	29	13	10	6	42	27	+15	6	42
5	São Paulo	28	11	14	3	35	21	+14	5	41
6	Corinthians	27	13	9	5	29	17	+12	3	38
7	Flamengo	28	13	5	10	34	28	+6	7	38
8	América-RJ	27	11	9	7	35	27	+8	6	37
9	Palmeiras	27	9	11	7	32	27	+5	7	36
10	Guarani	27	8	12	7	29	25	+4	6	34
11	Sport	28	8	13	7	29	28	+1	3	32
12	Portuguesa	23	9	8	6	28	21	+7	4	30
13	Náutico	23	9	5	9	30	28	+2	6	29
14	Grêmio	28	6	13	9	32	30	+2	4	29
15	Botafogo	21	7	6	8	24	25	−1	3	23
16	Nacional-AM	21	3	8	10	14	34	−20	1	15
17	Goiás	21	6	11	4	24	22	+2	4	27
18	Remo	20	7	8	5	22	23	−1	3	25
19	Vasco da Gama	21	7	7	7	25	23	+2	3	24
20	Atlético Mineiro	20	6	9	5	24	24	0	3	24
21	Figueirense	21	5	10	6	25	25	0	2	22
22	Coritiba	20	6	6	8	19	20	−1	3	21
23	Tiradentes	20	6	5	9	17	23	−6	2	19
24	América de Natal	21	6	5	10	28	36	−8	2	19
25	Bahia	16	5	9	2	20	12	+8	3	22
26	Santos	16	6	4	6	20	18	+2	4	20
27	Fortaleza	14	5	6	3	13	11	+2	1	17
28	Goiânia	16	6	3	7	17	20	−3	1	16
29	Atlético Paranaense	14	5	3	6	22	21	+1	3	16
30	Comercial-MS	14	5	4	5	14	17	−3	1	15
31	Vitória	16	5	3	8	13	24	−11	2	15
32	CEUB	16	4	6	6	16	20	−4	1	15
33	CSA	16	5	3	8	12	19	−7	1	14
34	Ceará	14	4	3	7	8	15	−7	2	13
35	Desportiva Capixaba	16	4	4	8	15	26	−11	1	13
36	América Mineiro	14	2	8	4	11	15	−4	1	13
37	Paysandu	14	3	5	6	18	21	−3	1	12
38	Americano	16	5	0	11	12	24	−12	1	11
39	Rio Negro	14	2	6	6	9	18	−9	1	11
40	Sergipe	16	2	4	10	11	27	−16	1	9
41	Moto Club	14	1	3	10	13	36	−23	0	5
42	Campinense	16	0	4	12	13	44	−31	0	4

Source: rsssf.com
