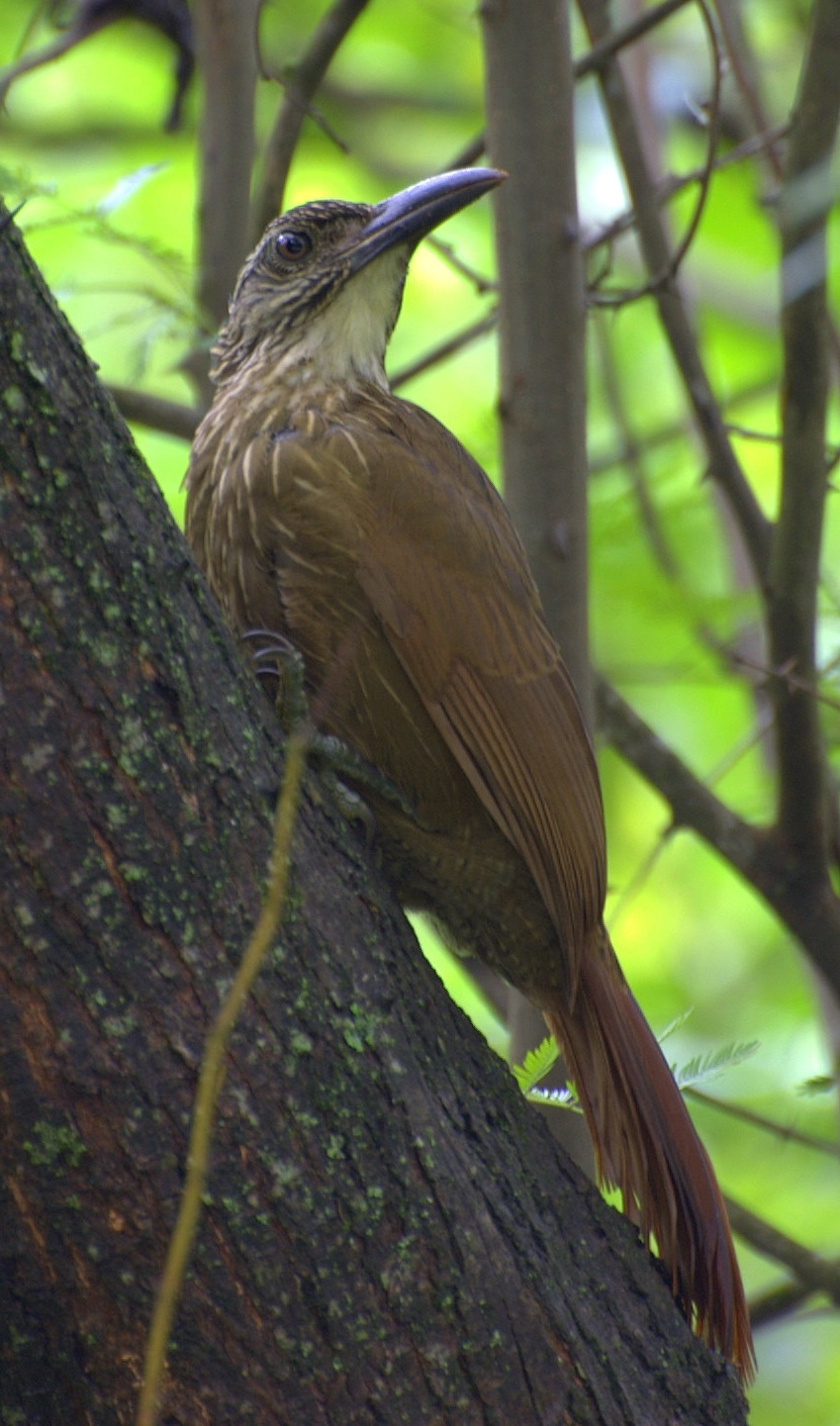
- White-throated woodcreeper (Xiphocolaptes albicollis)

Scientific classification
- Kingdom: Animalia
- Phylum: Chordata
- Class: Aves
- Order: Passeriformes
- Family: Furnariidae
- Subfamily: Dendrocolaptinae
- Genus: Xiphocolaptes; Lesson, 1840

Type species
- Dendrocopus albicollis Vieillot, 1818

Species
- see text

= Xiphocolaptes =

Genus of birds

Xiphocolaptes is a genus of bird in the Dendrocolaptinae subfamily.

== Species ==
The genus contains four species:

Image	Scientific name	Common name	Distribution
	Xiphocolaptes promeropirhynchus	Strong-billed woodcreeper	Belize, Bolivia, Brazil, Colombia, Costa Rica, Ecuador, El Salvador, Guatemala, Guyana, Honduras, Mexico, Nicaragua, Panama, Peru, and Venezuela
	Xiphocolaptes albicollis	White-throated woodcreeper	Argentina, Brazil, and Paraguay.
	Xiphocolaptes falcirostris	Moustached woodcreeper	Brazil.
	Xiphocolaptes major	Great rufous woodcreeper	Argentina, Bolivia, Brazil, and Paraguay.
