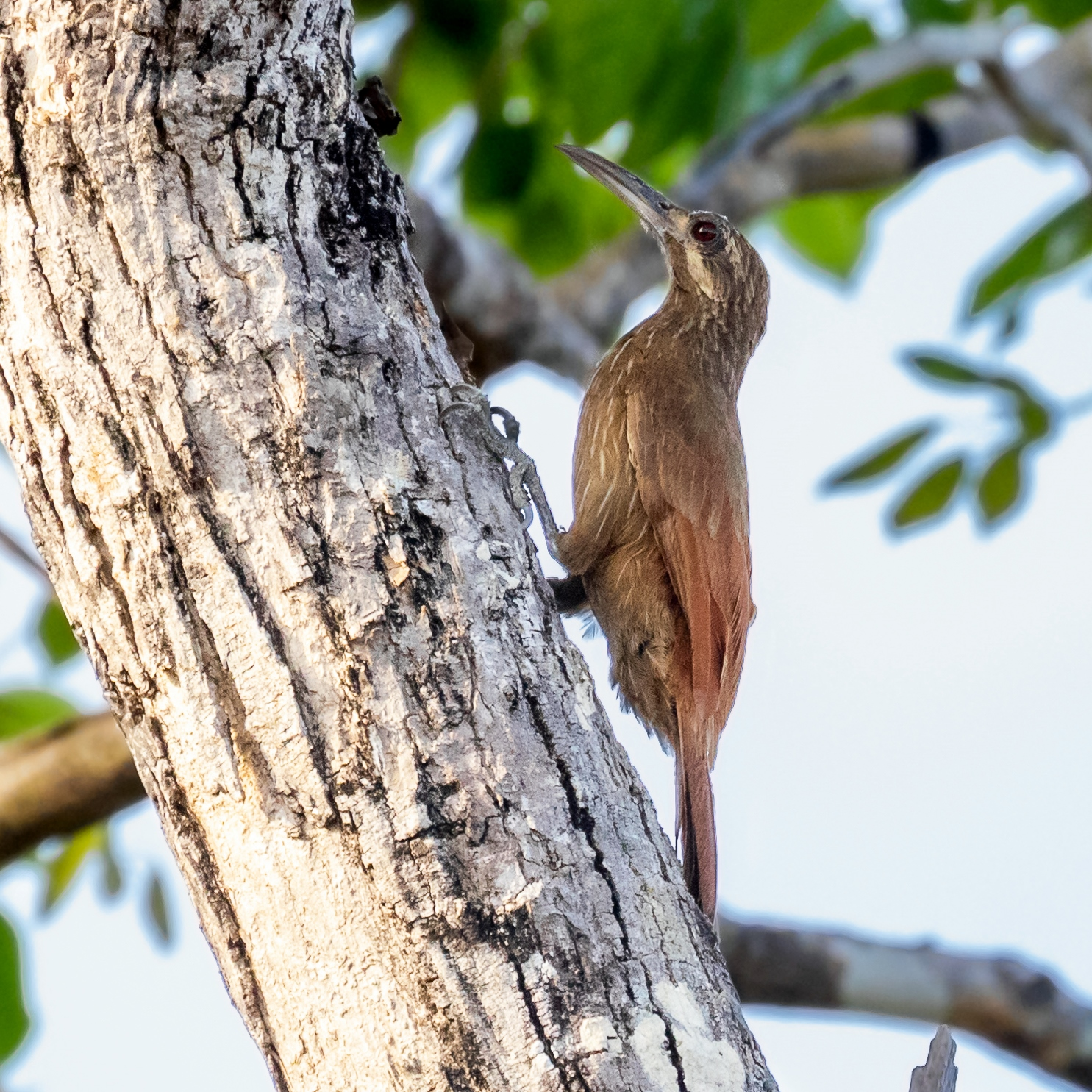

Conservation status
- Vulnerable (IUCN 3.1)

Scientific classification
- Kingdom: Animalia
- Phylum: Chordata
- Class: Aves
- Order: Passeriformes
- Family: Furnariidae
- Genus: Xiphocolaptes
- Species: X. falcirostris

Binomial name
- Xiphocolaptes falcirostris (Spix, 1824)

= Moustached woodcreeper =

Species of bird in Brazil

The moustached woodcreeper (Xiphocolaptes falcirostris) is a Vulnerable species of bird in the subfamily Dendrocolaptinae of the ovenbird family Furnariidae. It is endemic to Brazil.

== Taxonomy and systematics ==
The moustached woodcreeper has two subspecies, the nominate X. f. falcirostris (Spix, 1824) and X. f. franciscanus (Snethlage, 1927). The latter has sometimes been treated as a separate species ("Snethlage's woodcreeper") and by at least one author as a subspecies of the white-throated woodcreeper (X. albicollis). Subspecies X. a. villanovae of the white-throated has sometimes been assigned to the moustached woodcreeper.

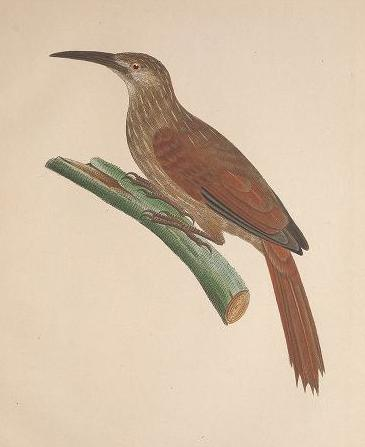

== Description ==
The moustached woodcreeper is one of the largest members of its subfamily. It is heavy-bodied, with a shortish tail and a long thin bill. It is 28 to 32 cm (11 to 13 in) long and weighs about 110 g (3.9 oz). The sexes have the same plumage. Adults of the nominate subspecies have a brown face with a buffy supercilium, lores, and moustachial stripe. Their crown is cinnamon-brown to dark olive-brown with thin buff streaks. Their back is rufous-brown and their rump, wings, and tail are cinnamon-rufous. Their throat is pale buffy to whitish and their underparts light brown to cinnamon-buff. Their flanks have faint buffy streaks and their central belly has faint grayish brown bars. Their iris is dark reddish to brown, their maxilla dark gray to black, their mandible pale gray to horn colored, and their legs and feet olive-gray to dark gray. Juveniles are similar to adults with wider and blackish streaks on the belly and a dark mandible. Subspecies X. f. franciscanus compared to the nominate has on average a shorter tail and a longer bill, darker and more olive underparts, weaker streaks on the crown, and narrower streaks on the belly. The subspecies overlap in all characteristics.

== Distribution and habitat ==
The nominate subspecies of the moustached woodcreeper is found in northeastern Brazil, from eastern Maranhão, Piauí, and northwestern Bahia east as far as western Paraíba and central Pernambuco. It occurs only locally within that area. Subspecies X. f. franciscanus is found in eastern Brazil west of the São Francisco River in western Bahia and northern and northwestern Minas Gerais. The species inhabits deciduous and semi-deciduous woodland, wooded caatinga, and gallery forest. It favors the interior of intact and slightly altered forest, tending to stay in the tallest growth. It occasionally occurs at the edges of the forest. In elevation it mostly occurs below 500 m (1,600 ft) but reaches as high as 800 m (2,600 ft) at sites in the northern part of its range.

== Behavior ==
=== Movement ===
The moustached woodcreeper is a year-round resident throughout its range.

=== Feeding ===
The moustached woodcreeper's diet is primarily insects, though it has been observed eating snails. It typically forages singly, in pairs, or in what are thought to be family groups; it shuns mixed-species feeding flocks. It is not known to follow army ant swarms. It mostly forages from the forest mid-level to the canopy but sometimes on the ground as well. It hitches along trunks and branches, probing cavities, bark, and especially bromeliads.

=== Breeding ===
The moustached woodcreeper is thought to breed in the austral summer, roughly between October and December. No nest has been found, so the clutch size, incubation period, and time to fledging are not known. Both males and females have been found with brood patches, so both parents are thought to incubate eggs and care for nestlings.

=== Vocalization ===
The moustached woodcreeper's song is a "series of 4-7 double-notes, like 'wèèè-TJUH wèèè-TJUH - -'." The notes often gradually change to "Tu-Tjuh". Its call is a "whining, drawn-out 'wèèè-tuh' " with the "tuh" being "high and dry".

== Status ==
The IUCN originally assessed the moustached woodcreeper as Threatened but since 1994 has classed it as Vulnerable. It has a fairly large overall range, but only inhabits isolated fragments. Its total population size is unknown, but believed to be decreasing.
