= Osmer =

Osmer is the name of:

- James H. Osmer (1832–1912), American politician
- Osmer B. Wheeler (1809–1906), American politician
- Osmer Morales (born 1992), Venezuelan baseball player

== See also ==
- Osmar, a list of people with the given name
- Osmers, a list of people with the surname
