= Ronaldo Passos =

Brazilian footballer (born 1959)

Personal information
- Full name: Ronaldo Vieira Passos
- Date of birth: 26 November 1959 (age 66)
- Place of birth: Salvador, Brazil
- Position: Goalkeeper

Youth career
- Bahia

Senior career*
Years	Team	Apps	(Gls)
1979–1990	Bahia		
1990–1997	Vitória		
- * Club domestic league appearances and goals as of 31 January 2024

Ronaldo Vieira Passos (born 26 November 1959), better known as Ronaldo or Ronaldo Passos, is a Brazilian former professional footballer who played as a goalkeeper.

== Career ==
Born in Salvador, Ronaldo played for the state's two big teams, from 1979 to 1990 for Bahia and from 1990 to 1997 for Vitória, managing to become state champion several times, and most importantly, being the goalkeeper in the finals of the 1988 Brazilian title.

== Honours ==
Bahia

- Campeonato Brasileiro: 1988
- Campeonato Baiano: 1979, 1981, 1982, 1983, 1984, 1986, 1987, 1988

Vitória

- Campeonato Baiano: 1992, 1995, 1996
