= Newmar (footballer) =

Brazilian footballer

Personal information
- Full name: Newmar José Sackis
- Date of birth: 2 May 1961 (age 65)
- Place of birth: Ourinhos, Brazil
- Height: 1.85 m (6 ft 1 in)
- Position: Centre-back

Youth career
- Matsubara

Senior career*
Years	Team	Apps	(Gls)
1978–1979	Matsubara		
1980–1984	Grêmio	127	(13)
1984	Náutico		
1985	Vasco da Gama		
1985	Grêmio		
1986–1987	Coritiba		
1987–1989	Pinheiros-PR		
1988–1989	→ Bahia (loan)		
1990	Blumenau		
1991	São Luiz		
1992–1993	Bagé		
1994	Marília		
1994	Brasil de Pelotas		

International career
1981	Brazil U20		
- * Club domestic league appearances and goals as of 23 January 2024

Newmar José Sackis (born 2 May 1961), simply known as Newmar, is a Brazilian former professional footballer who played as a centre-back.

== Career ==
Revealed at SE Matsubara de Cambará, Newmar was part of the Brazil under-20 team that won the Toulon Tournament in 1981. At Grêmio, he was part of the squad that won the 1983 Copa Libertadores and 1983 Intercontinental Cup, in addition to the Brazilian championship in 1981. He also played for Coritiba and Pinheiros-PR, being state champion for both, and in Bahia in 1988, once again being part of the Brazilian championship title.

== Honours ==
Grêmio

- Intercontinental Cup: 1983
- Copa Libertadores: 1983
- Campeonato Brasileiro: 1981
- Campeonato Gaúcho: 1980

Coritiba

- Campeonato Paranaense: 1986

Pinheiros

- Campeonato Paranaense: 1987

Bahia

- Campeonato Brasileiro: 1988

Brazil U20

- Toulon Tournament: 1981
