= Norberto Lemos =

Brazilian footballer

Norberto
Personal information
- Full name: Norberto Arruda Lemos
- Date of birth: 18 February 1964 (age 62)
- Place of birth: Londrina, Brazil
- Position: Midfielder

Senior career*
Years	Team	Apps	(Gls)
1982–1985	Pinheiros-PR		
1986–1990	Internacional		
1990–1991	Coritiba		
1991–1992	Grêmio		
1991	→ Ponte Preta (loan)		
1993–1994	Coritiba		
1994–1995	Portuguesa		
1995	Fluminense		
1996	Rio Branco-SP		
1996	Goiás		
1997	Bragantino		

Managerial career
- 2009: Rio Branco-PR
- 2009: APAFUT-RS
- 2009–2010: Operário Ferroviário
- 2010: Rio Branco-PR
- 2016: APAFUT-RS
- 2019: Rio Branco-PR
- 2019: Apucarana Sports
- 2019–2020: Andraus
- 2021: Rio Branco-PR
- 2021: Andraus
- 2022–2023: Rio Branco-PR
- * Club domestic league appearances and goals as of 8 January 2024

Norberto Arruda Lemos (born 18 February 1964), better known as Norberto or Norberto Lemos, is a Brazilian former professional footballer and manager who played as a midfielder.

== Career ==
With an unusual start, Norberto switched from boxing to football. He started his career at Pinheiros and had a meteoric rise, being the highlight of the state champion team. He was signed by Internacional and became Silver Ball in 1987. He didn't win any major titles, but he also played for Grêmio, Coritiba, Portuguesa, and Fluminense.

== Managerial career ==
Norberto became a coach and accumulated work in particular in Paraná, for Rio Branco de Paranaguá, and for Andraus where he was champion of the third division in 2019.

== Honours ==
=== Player ===
Pinheiros-PR

- Campeonato Paranaense: 1984
- Campeonato Paranaense Série Prata: 1982

Individual

- 1987 Bola de Prata

=== Manager ===
Andraus

- Campeonato Paranaense Série Bronze: 2019
