= Nílson (footballer, born 1965) =

Brazilian footballer

Nilson
Personal information
- Full name: Nilson Esidio Mora
- Date of birth: 19 November 1965 (age 60)
- Place of birth: Santa Rita do Passa Quatro, Brazil
- Height: 1.88 m (6 ft 2 in)
- Position: Forward

Senior career*
Years	Team	Apps	(Gls)
- XV de Jaú
- Sertãozinho
- XV de Jaú
- Ponte Preta
–1989	Internacional		
1989–1990	Celta Vigo		
–1991	Grêmio		
1992	Portuguesa		
1992	Corinthians		
1993	Flamengo		
1993	Fluminense		
1993–1994	Albacete	25	(8)
1994–1995	Real Valladolid	24	(6)
1995	Palmeiras		
1996–	Vasco da Gama		
–1997	Tigres UANL		
1997	Athletico Paranaense		
1998	Sporting Cristal		
1999	Santo André		
2000	Universitario		
2001	Santa Cruz		
2002	Rio Branco		
2003	Flamengo		
2003	Nacional		

International career
1989–1992	Brazil	4	(0)
- * Club domestic league appearances and goals

Nilson Esidio Mora (born 19 November 1965) is a Brazilian former professional footballer who played as a forward. In 1993, he played 34 games and scored 25 goals for Flamengo.

During his playing career, Nílson made 110 appearances and scored 44 goals in the Campeonato Brasileiro.

He made four appearances for the Brazil national team from 1989 to 1992.

== Honours ==
Internacional

- Rio Grande do Sul State Championship: 1990

Individual

- Primera División Peruana top scorer: 1998
