= Osmar (footballer, born March 1987) =

Brazilian footballer

Personal information
- Full name: Osmar Ferreira Júnior
- Date of birth: 21 March 1987 (age 39)
- Place of birth: São Gonçalo, Rio de Janeiro, Brazil
- Height: 1.81 m (5 ft 11 1/2 in)
- Position: Forward

Youth career
- 2002–2007: Fluminense

Senior career*
| Years | Team | Apps | (Gls) |
| 2006–2007 | Fluminense | 4 | (0) |
| 2007 | Dinamo Zagreb | 0 | (0) |
| 2007 | → Inter Zaprešić (loan) | 6 | (0) |
| 2008 | América (RJ) | 3 | (0) |
| 2008–2009 | Macaé | 6 | (3) |
| 2011–2012 | Operário Ferroviário | 8 | (1) |
- * Club domestic league appearances and goals

Osmar Ferreira Júnior (born 21 March 1987 in São Gonçalo, Rio de Janeiro) is a Brazilian footballer

== Biography ==
Osmar started his career at Fluminense. In mid-2007 he left for Croatian club Dinamo Zagreb but in February 2008 returned to América (RJ). In June 2008 he was signed by Série C club Macaé, which he scored 3 goals (1 goal and a brace) for the team at the first stage. Osmar signed on 2 January 2011 for Operário Ferroviário Esporte Clube.
