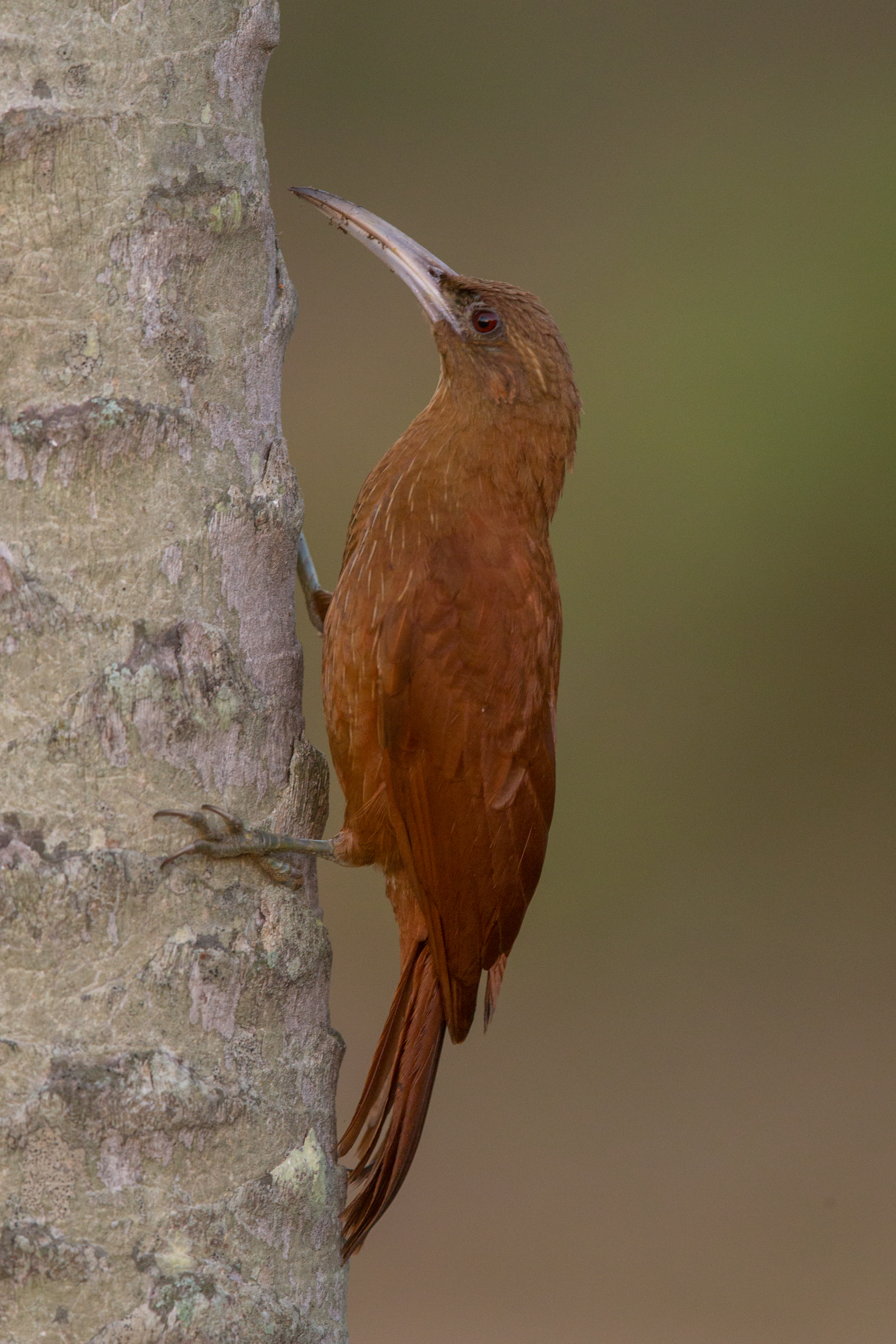
- at Bonito, Mato Grosso do Sul State, Brazil

Conservation status
- Least Concern (IUCN 3.1)

Scientific classification
- Kingdom: Animalia
- Phylum: Chordata
- Class: Aves
- Order: Passeriformes
- Family: Furnariidae
- Genus: Xiphocolaptes
- Species: X. major

Binomial name
- Xiphocolaptes major (Vieillot, 1818)

= Great rufous woodcreeper =

Species of bird

The great rufous woodcreeper (Xiphocolaptes major) is a species of bird in the subfamily Dendrocolaptinae of the ovenbird family Furnariidae. It is found in Argentina, Bolivia, Brazil, and Paraguay.

== Taxonomy and systematics ==
The great rufous woodcreeper has these four subspecies:

- X. m. remoratus Pinto, 1945
- X. m. castaneus Ridgway, 1890
- X. m. estebani Cardoso da Silva & Oren, 1991
- X. m. major (Vieillot, 1818)

== Description ==
The great rufous woodcreeper is the largest, though not the heaviest, member of its subfamily. It is heavy-bodied with a long, heavy, somewhat decurved bill. It is 27 to 34 cm (11 to 13 in) long. Males weigh 120 to 150 g (4.2 to 5.3 oz) and females 120 to 162 g (4.2 to 5.7 oz). The sexes have the same plumage. Adults of the nominate subspecies X. m. major are almost entirely bright rufous-cinnamon. Their crown is slightly darker, their tail more chestnut, and their flight feathers reddish brown with dusky tips on the primaries. Their lores are blackish, their throat pale cinnamon with whitish buff streaks, and their underparts cinnamon with some buffy streaks on the breast and dusky brownish bars on the belly. Their iris is dark brown, rich red-brown, or crimson. Their bill is pale, from horn colored to horn-white, and their legs and feet dark grayish olive, greenish, or bluish gray. Juveniles are generally brighter overall than adults, especially on their underparts; they have stronger streaks on the breast but weaker ones on the crown.

Subspecies X. m. remoratus has darker upperparts than the nominate, with less reddish underparts that are more heavily streaked and barred. X. m. castaneus is darker overall than the nominate, with a more brownish head, deeper chestnut upperparts, and less streaking and barring on the underparts. X. m. estebani is overall much lighter than the nominate but otherwise similar.

== Distribution and habitat ==
The subspecies of the great rufous woodcreeper are found thus:

- X. m. remoratus, southwestern Mato Grosso state of Brazil
- X. m. castaneus, north-central and eastern Bolivia, southern Brazil's Mato Grosso do Sul state, and northwestern Argentina's Jujuy and Salta provinces
- X. m. estebani, northwestern Argentina's Tucumán Province
- X. m. major, western Paraguay and northern Argentina as far south as Córdoba and Santa Fe provinces

The great rufous woodcreeper inhabits a variety of forest landscapes including dry woodland, semi-deciduous woodland, gallery forest, and Gran Chaco woodland. It also occurs in scrubby forest, cerrado, and wooded savanna. It favors the forest interior but occasionally occurs at its edges. In elevation it mostly occurs below 1,500 m (4,900 ft) but reaches as high as 1,800 m (5,900 ft).

== Behavior ==
=== Movement ===
The great rufous woodcreeper is a year-round resident throughout its range.

=== Feeding ===
The great rufous woodcreeper's diet is mostly insects, and it feeds on smaller amounts of other arthropods and small vertebrates. It mostly forages alone or in pairs, and occasionally in trios that are thought to be family groups. It is not known to follow army ant swarms or join mixed-species feeding flocks. It forages from the ground to the subcanopy, turning over leaf litter and hitching along trunks and branches, probing and gleaning for prey.

=== Breeding ===
The great rufous woodcreeper's breeding season is not well defined, but includes October and November. It nests in a cavity, either natural or excavated by a woodpecker, to which it adds material like leaves and wood chips. The clutch size is two or three eggs. The incubation period, time to fledging, and details of parental care are not known.

=== Vocalization ===
The great rufous woodcreeper's song is a "slightly descending series of 5-8 double-noted whistles, like 'wéettuck - -'." It has a "loud, ringing quality". The species gives a "two-part call...[an] emphatic...'eeehr-eek!'."

== Status ==
The IUCN has assessed the great rufous woodcreeper as being of Least Concern. It has a large range but its population size is not known and is believed to be decreasing. No immediate threats have been identified. It is generally considered rare to uncommon, though more common in some locations. It is thought to be "only moderately sensitive to habitat loss and other forms of human disturbance, and thus a relatively low conservation and research priority."
