= Osmar (footballer, born 1961) =

Brazilian footballer

Personal information
- Full name: Osmar dos Santos Machado
- Date of birth: 18 April 1961 (age 65)
- Place of birth: São Francisco do Conde, Brazil
- Height: 1.69 m (5 ft 7 in)
- Position: Forward

Senior career*
Years	Team	Apps	(Gls)
1981	Ypiranga-BA		
1982–1983	Galícia		
1983–1989	Bahia		
1990	Botafogo-SP		
1991	Fluminense de Feira		
1992	Bahia		
1992	Fortaleza		
1993–1994	Ceará		
1995	Fluminense de Feira		
1996	Paysandu		
1996–1997	Paraná		
1998	Iraty		
1999	Ceará		
1999	Tuna Luso		
2000–2001	Fluminense de Feira		

Managerial career
- 2013: Atlético de Alagoinhas
- * Club domestic league appearances and goals as of 31 January 2024

Osmar dos Santos Machado (born 18 April 1961), simply known as Osmar, is a Brazilian former professional footballer and manager, who played as a forward.

== Career ==
Osmar began his career at EC Ypiranga at the age of 20, and also played for Galícia EC until arriving at Bahia in 1983. He suffered a tibia injury that sidelined him for three years, but returned in style during the 1987 season, being the team's main scorer. In 1988 he made history, being top scorer in the state and Brazilian champion with Bahia.

In the following years he was successful in football in Ceará, winning for Fortaleza and Ceará. He also defended Fluminense de Feira on several occasions, and Paraná Clube, where he was state champion twice more in 1986 and 1987. In 2013, he had experience as a manager at Atlético Alagoinhas.

== Honours ==
Bahia

- Campeonato Brasileiro: 1988
- Campeonato Baiano: 1987, 1988, 1991

Fortaleza

- Campeonato Cearense: 1992

Ceará

- Campeonato Cearense: 1993

Paraná

- Campeonato Paranaense: 1996, 1997

Individual

- 1988 Campeonato Baiano top scorer: 19 goals
- 1992 Campeonato Cearense top scorer: 17 goals
