= Osmar Teixeira =

Brazilian politician (born 1998)

- Teixeira in 2024

Member of the Legislative Assembly of Santa Catarina
- Incumbent
- Assumed office 1 February 2027

Personal details
- Born: 29 May 1998 (age 28)
- Party: Podemos (since 2025)

Osmar Anibal Teixeira Júnior (born 29 May 1998) is a Brazilian politician who was elected member of the Legislative Assembly of Santa Catarina in 2026. From 2021 to 2024, he was a municipal councillor of Itajaí.
