= Senhor do Bonfim =

Coordinates: 10°27′S 40°11′W

- Municipality
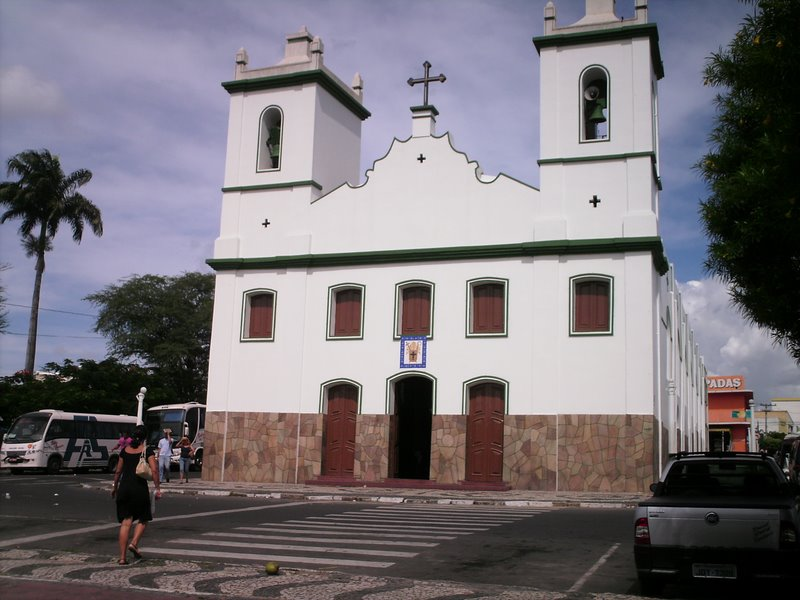

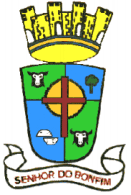
- Flag Coat of arms
- Interactive map of Senhor do Bonfim
- Country: Brazil
- Region: Nordeste
- State: Bahia

Population (2020)
  - Total: 79,424
- Time zone: UTC−3 (BRT)

Senhor do Bonfim is a municipality in the state of Bahia in the North-East region of Brazil.

EC Ipatinga de Bahia is the local association football team.

== Climate ==
Climate data for Senhor do Bonfim (1981–2010)
Month	Jan	Feb	Mar	Apr	May	Jun	Jul	Aug	Sep	Oct	Nov	Dec	Year
Mean daily maximum °C (°F)	31.9 (89.4)	31.9 (89.4)	31.5 (88.7)	30.0 (86.0)	28.0 (82.4)	26.2 (79.2)	25.8 (78.4)	27.0 (80.6)	29.5 (85.1)	31.5 (88.7)	31.6 (88.9)	31.8 (89.2)	29.7 (85.5)
Daily mean °C (°F)	26.0 (78.8)	26.1 (79.0)	25.9 (78.6)	24.9 (76.8)	23.3 (73.9)	21.7 (71.1)	21.1 (70.0)	21.6 (70.9)	23.4 (74.1)	25.2 (77.4)	25.6 (78.1)	25.9 (78.6)	24.2 (75.6)
Mean daily minimum °C (°F)	21.1 (70.0)	21.3 (70.3)	21.5 (70.7)	21.0 (69.8)	20.0 (68.0)	18.7 (65.7)	17.9 (64.2)	17.8 (64.0)	18.6 (65.5)	19.9 (67.8)	20.5 (68.9)	20.9 (69.6)	19.9 (67.8)
Average precipitation mm (inches)	75.5 (2.97)	65.6 (2.58)	96.2 (3.79)	80.6 (3.17)	73.4 (2.89)	79.7 (3.14)	63.3 (2.49)	40.3 (1.59)	21.1 (0.83)	28.7 (1.13)	65.1 (2.56)	62.8 (2.47)	752.3 (29.62)
Average precipitation days (≥ 1.0 mm)	6	5	8	8	10	12	12	9	5	3	5	4	87
Average relative humidity (%)	58.9	59.1	63.9	68.0	73.6	77.7	74.2	69.4	61.2	55.4	58.6	59.1	64.9
Mean monthly sunshine hours	225.7	199.6	211.0	189.3	165.5	133.8	155.8	190.2	207.5	230.3	207.3	212.2	2,328.2
Source: Instituto Nacional de Meteorologia
