= 1992 Campeonato Carioca =

Campeonato Carioca
- Season: 1992
- Champions: Vasco da Gama
- Relegated: Barra Mansa; AA Cabofriense; Paduano; União Nacional
- Copa do Brasil: Vasco da Gama; Flamengo
- Matches played: 314
- Goals scored: 659 (2.1 per match)
- Top goalscorer: Ézio (Fluminense) - 15 goals
- Biggest home win: Olympico 9-1 Cabofriense (December 20, 1992)
- Biggest away win: Olympico 0-4 Olaria (August 15, 1992); América 0-4 Vasco da Gama (September 20, 1992); América 0-4 Flamengo (November 2, 1992); América de Três Rios 0-4 Flamengo (November 28, 1992)
- Highest scoring: Olympico 9-1 Cabofriense (December 20, 1992)

The 1992 edition of the Campeonato Carioca kicked off on August 1, 1992 and ended on December 20, 1992. It is the official tournament organized by FFERJ (Federação de Futebol do Estado do Rio de Janeiro, or Rio de Janeiro State Football Federation. Only clubs based in the Rio de Janeiro State are allowed to play. Twenty-six teams contested this edition. Vasco da Gama won the title for the 18th time. Barra Mansa, AA Cabofriense, Paduano and União Nacional were relegated.

== System ==
The tournament would be divided in three stages:

- Taça Guanabara: The twenty-six teams were divided into two groups; Group A, with twelve teams, and Group B, with fourteen. each team played in a single round-robin format against the teams of their group. The champion of Group A qualified to the Finals. The top two teams of Group B were promoted to Group A.
- Taça Rio: The disposition of the groups now was inversed, with Group A having fourteen teams and Group B twelve. each team all played in a single round-robin format against the teams of their group. The champion of Group A qualified to the Finals. The four bottom teams of Group A would be relegated to Group B for 1992's Taça Guanabara. In Group B, the top two teams were promoted to Group A and the bottom four teams were relegated to the Second Level.
- Finals: They would be disputed by the champions of Taça Guanabara and Taça Rio. if the same team won both of them, they would not be held.

== Championship ==
=== Taça Guanabara ===
==== Group A ====
Pos	Team	Pld	W	D	L	GF	GA	GD	Pts	Qualification or relegation
1	Vasco da Gama	11	7	4	0	17	2	+15	18	Qualified to Finals
2	Flamengo	11	7	2	2	26	10	+16	16	
3	Bangu	11	6	4	1	17	7	+10	16	
4	Botafogo	11	6	3	2	14	9	+5	15	
5	Fluminense	11	5	4	2	21	11	+10	14	
6	Madureira	11	5	4	2	9	11	−2	14	
7	Volta Redonda	11	2	5	4	7	12	−5	9	
8	América de Três Rios	11	2	4	5	11	16	−5	8	
9	Americano	11	3	1	7	12	18	−6	7	
10	Campo Grande	11	2	1	8	6	21	−15	5	
11	América	11	1	3	7	9	17	−8	5	
12	Itaperuna	11	1	3	7	8	20	−12	0 (Note: Itaperuna lost five points for fielding a ineligible player)	

Updated to match(es) played on October 5, 1992. Source: RSSSF.com
Rules for classification: 1) points; 2) wins; 3) goal difference; 4) number of goals scored.

==== Group B ====
Pos	Team	Pld	W	D	L	GF	GA	GD	Pts	Qualification or relegation
1	Goytacaz	13	7	5	1	17	4	+13	19	Promoted to Group A
2	Olaria	13	7	3	3	20	9	+11	17	Promoted to Group A
3	Friburguense	13	7	3	3	25	16	+9	17	
4	Entrerriense	13	6	5	2	15	11	+4	17	
5	Saquarema	13	5	6	2	15	11	+4	16	
6	São Cristóvão	13	4	6	3	14	11	+3	14	
7	Portuguesa	13	4	6	3	14	15	−1	14	
8	Bonsucesso	13	5	3	5	12	13	−1	13	
9	Mesquita	13	4	3	6	9	13	−4	11	
10	Barra Mansa	13	3	5	5	10	13	−3	11	
11	União Nacional	13	3	5	5	7	11	−4	11	
12	Paduano	13	3	3	7	10	16	−6	9	
13	AA Cabofriense	13	3	3	7	7	13	−6	9	
14	Olympico	13	1	2	10	14	33	−19	4	

Updated to match(es) played on October 4, 1992. Source: RSSSF.com
Rules for classification: 1) points; 2) wins; 3) goal difference; 4) number of goals scored.

=== Taça Rio ===
==== Group A ====
Pos	Team	Pld	W	D	L	GF	GA	GD	Pts	Qualification or relegation
1	Vasco da Gama	13	11	2	0	27	8	+19	24	Champion
2	Flamengo	13	8	2	3	23	8	+15	18	
3	Fluminense	13	7	3	3	19	11	+8	17	
4	América de Três Rios	13	5	5	3	17	16	+1	15	
5	Botafogo	13	4	7	2	18	15	+3	15	
6	Americano	13	3	8	2	11	10	+1	15	
7	Olaria	13	5	4	4	11	8	+3	14	
8	Volta Redonda	13	4	4	5	13	16	−3	12	
9	Bangu	13	2	6	5	7	10	−3	10	
10	América	13	2	6	5	10	16	−6	10 (Note: Americano won the points of a away tie against Itaperuna after the match was suspended due to lack of safety.)	
11	Campo Grande	13	3	3	7	9	13	−4	9	Relegated to 1992 Group B
12	Itaperuna	13	3	3	7	9	21	−12	8	Relegated to 1992 Group B
13	Goytacaz	13	2	4	7	8	17	−9	8	Relegated to 1992 Group B
14	Madureira	13	1	5	7	5	18	−13	7	Relegated to 1992 Group B

Updated to match(es) played on December 6, 1992. Source: RSSSF.com
Rules for classification: 1) points; 2) wins; 3) goal difference; 4) number of goals scored.

==== Group B ====
Pos	Team	Pld	W	D	L	GF	GA	GD	Pts	Qualification or relegation
1	Entrerriense	11	6	4	1	15	6	+9	16	Promoted to 1992 Group A
2	São Cristóvão	11	6	3	2	14	8	+6	15	Promoted to 1992 Group A
3	Olympico	11	5	4	2	21	9	+12	14	
4	Portuguesa	11	5	4	2	10	6	+4	14	
5	Friburguense	11	4	6	1	12	7	+5	14	
6	Mesquita	11	3	5	3	10	8	+2	11	
7	Bonsucesso	11	3	5	3	9	10	−1	11	
8	Saquarema	11	3	4	4	14	15	−1	10	
9	Barra Mansa	11	3	4	4	8	9	−1	10	Relegated to Second Level
10	União Nacional	11	3	3	5	7	12	−5	9	Relegated to Second Level
11	Paduano	11	1	3	7	4	15	−11	5	Relegated to Second Level
12	AA Cabofriense	11	0	3	8	2	21	−19	3	Relegated to Second Level

Updated to match(es) played on December 20, 1992. Source: RSSSF.com
Rules for classification: 1) points; 2) wins; 3) goal difference; 4) number of goals scored.
