= 1991 Campeonato Carioca =

Season of Carioca Championship

Campeonato Carioca
- Season: 1991
- Champions: Flamengo
- Relegated: Miguel Couto; Nova Cidade
- Copa do Brasil: Vasco da Gama; Fluminense
- Matches played: 256
- Goals scored: 515 (2.01 per match)
- Top goalscorer: Gaúcho (Flamengo) - 17 goals
- Biggest home win: Vasco da Gama 7-1 Goytacaz (November 1, 1991)
- Biggest away win: Volta Redonda 1-6 Botafogo (September 15, 1991)
- Highest scoring: Flamengo 5-3 América (August 14, 1991); Vasco da Gama 7-1 Goytacaz (November 1, 1991)

The 1991 edition of the Campeonato Carioca kicked off on August 3, 1991 and ended on December 19, 1991. It is the official tournament organized by FFERJ (Federação de Futebol do Estado do Rio de Janeiro, or Rio de Janeiro State Football Federation. Only clubs based in the Rio de Janeiro State are allowed to play. Twenty-four teams contested this edition. Flamengo won the title for the 23rd time. Miguel Couto and Nova Cidade were relegated.

== System ==
The tournament would be divided in three stages:

- Taça Guanabara: The twenty-four teams were divided into two groups of twelve teams; Group A, with the ten best teams of last year's championship and the two best teams from the Second Level, and Group B, with the bottom two teams from the first level and the ten best non-promoted teams from the Second Level. each team played in a single round-robin format against the teams of their group. The champion of Group A qualified to the Finals. The bottom two teams of Group A were relegated to Group B and The top two teams of Group B were promoted to Group A.
- Taça Rio: Each team played in a single round-robin format against the teams of their group. The champion of Group A qualified to the Finals. The bottom two teams of Group A were relegated to Group B and The top two teams of Group B were promoted to Group A for the next year. The bottom two teams of Group B were relegated to the Second Level.
- Finals: They would be disputed by the champions of Taça Guanabara and Taça Rio, in two matches.

== Championship ==
=== Taça Guanabara ===
==== Group A ====
Pos	Team	Pld	W	D	L	GF	GA	GD	Pts	Qualification or relegation
1	Fluminense	11	8	2	1	19	5	+14	18	Qualified to Finals
2	Flamengo	11	7	3	1	20	12	+8	17	
3	Botafogo	11	6	4	1	20	6	+14	16	
4	Vasco da Gama	11	6	3	2	14	8	+6	15	
5	Campo Grande	11	3	6	2	13	13	0	12	
6	Americano	11	2	6	3	9	11	−2	10	
7	Bangu	11	1	7	3	6	9	−3	9	
8	América	11	2	4	5	9	14	−5	8	
9	Itaperuna	11	2	4	5	7	12	−5	8	
10	América de Três Rios	11	2	3	6	10	20	−10	7	
11	Portuguesa	11	1	4	6	6	14	−8	6	Relegated to Group B
12	Volta Redonda	11	1	4	6	10	19	−9	6	Relegated to Group B

Updated to match(es) played on September 29, 1991. Source: RSSSF.com
Rules for classification: 1) points; 2) wins; 3) goal difference; 4) number of goals scored.

==== Group B ====
Pos	Team	Pld	W	D	L	GF	GA	GD	Pts	Qualification or relegation
1	São Cristóvão	11	8	2	1	16	5	+11	18	Promoted to Group A
2	Goytacaz	11	8	1	2	14	6	+8	17	Promoted to Group A
3	Mesquita	11	7	3	1	12	5	+7	17	
4	Friburguense	11	6	1	4	8	6	+2	13	
5	Bonsucesso	11	4	4	3	6	6	0	12	
6	Madureira	11	3	5	3	9	9	0	11	
7	Olaria	11	3	3	5	9	12	−3	9	
8	União Nacional	11	3	3	5	6	9	−3	9	
9	Nova Cidade	11	2	4	5	8	8	0	8	
10	AA Cabofriense	11	3	1	7	7	12	−5	7	
11	Paduano	11	1	4	6	7	16	−9	6	
12	Miguel Couto	11	1	3	7	4	12	−8	5	

Updated to match(es) played on September 29, 1992. Source: RSSSF.com
Rules for classification: 1) points; 2) wins; 3) goal difference; 4) number of goals scored.

=== Taça Rio ===
==== Group A ====
Pos	Team	Pld	W	D	L	GF	GA	GD	Pts	Qualification or relegation
1	Botafogo	11	8	3	0	31	15	+16	19	Playoffs
2	Flamengo	11	8	3	0	18	5	+13	19	Playoffs
3	Vasco da Gama	11	7	2	2	29	9	+20	16	
4	Fluminense	11	4	5	2	17	14	+3	13	
5	Campo Grande	11	5	2	4	17	16	+1	12	
6	América	11	4	4	3	14	11	+3	12	
7	América de Três Rios	11	2	5	4	5	10	−5	9	
8	Americano	11	2	5	4	9	16	−7	9	
9	Itaperuna	11	1	5	5	5	14	−9	7	
10	Bangu	11	1	4	6	6	13	−7	6	
11	São Cristóvão	11	2	1	8	9	22	−13	5	Relegated to 1992 Group B
12	Goytacaz	11	2	1	8	7	22	−15	5	Relegated to 1992 Group B

Updated to match(es) played on December 8, 1991. Source: RSSSF.com
Rules for classification: 1) points; 2) wins; 3) goal difference; 4) number of goals scored.

===== Playoffs =====
Team 1	Score	Team 2
Flamengo	1–0	Botafogo

==== Group B ====
Pos	Team	Pld	W	D	L	GF	GA	GD	Pts	Qualification or relegation
1	Volta Redonda	10	7	2	1	17	5	+12	16	Promoted to 1992 Group A
2	Madureira	10	6	3	1	12	5	+7	15	Promoted to 1992 Group A
3	Friburguense	10	3	7	0	9	6	+3	13	
4	Mesquita	10	4	4	2	8	6	+2	12	
5	Paduano	10	4	3	3	12	9	+3	11	
6	Bonsucesso	10	4	2	4	7	15	−8	10	
7	União Nacional	10	3	3	4	8	10	−2	9	
8	AA Cabofriense	10	1	6	3	5	7	−2	8	
9	Portuguesa	10	2	2	6	5	9	−4	6	
10	Olaria	10	2	2	6	4	8	−4	6	
11	Nova Cidade	10	0	4	6	3	10	−7	4	Relegated to Second Level
12	Miguel Couto	0	0	0	0	0	0	0	0	Withdrew

Updated to match(es) played on December 8, 1991. Source: RSSSF.com
Rules for classification: 1) points; 2) wins; 3) goal difference; 4) number of goals scored.

=== Finals ===
Team 1	Agg.	Team 2	1st leg	2nd leg
Flamengo	5–3	Fluminense	4–2	1–0
