= 1993 Campeonato Carioca =

Campeonato Carioca
- Season: 1993
- Champions: Vasco da Gama
- Relegated: América de Três Rios; Barreira; Bonsucesso; Entrerriense; Friburguense; Goytacaz; Mesquita; Olympico; Portuguesa; São Cristóvão; Saquarema; Serrano
- Copa do Brasil: Vasco da Gama; Fluminense
- Matches played: 267
- Goals scored: 556 (2.08 per match)
- Top goalscorer: Valdir (Vasco da Gama) - 19 goals
- Biggest home win: Vasco da Gama 6-0 América de Três Rios (February 25, 1993)
- Biggest away win: América de Três Rios 0-5 Flamengo (March 31, 1993)
- Highest scoring: Botafogo 7-2 São Cristóvão (May 27, 1993)

The 1993 edition of the Campeonato Carioca was kicked off on February 7, 1993 and ended on June 27, 1993. It is the official tournament organized by FFERJ (Federação de Futebol do Estado do Rio de Janeiro, or Rio de Janeiro State Football Federation. Only clubs based in the Rio de Janeiro State are allowed to play. Twenty-four teams contested this edition. Vasco da Gama won the title for the 19th time. twelve teams were relegated.

== System ==
The tournament would be divided in three stages:

- Taça Guanabara: The twenty-four teams were divided into two groups of twelve. each team played in a single round-robin format against the teams of their group. The champion of Group A qualified to the Finals. The bottom two teams of Group A were relegated to Group B and the top two teams of Group B were promoted to Group A.
- Taça Rio: The twenty-four teams were divided into two groups of twelve. each team all played in a single round-robin format against the teams of their group. The champion of Group A qualified to the Finals. The bottom two teams of Group A were relegated to the Second Level, along with the bottom ten teams of Group B.
- Finals: The Finals were disputed in a best of four points series, with the team with the best season record receiving one bonus point.

== Championship ==
=== Taça Guanabara ===
==== Group A ====
Pos	Team	Pld	W	D	L	GF	GA	GD	Pts	Qualification or relegation
1	Fluminense	11	8	3	0	17	6	+11	19	Qualified to Finals
2	Vasco da Gama	11	7	2	2	23	8	+15	16	
3	Flamengo	11	6	3	2	23	11	+12	15	
4	Botafogo	11	5	4	2	18	12	+6	14	
5	Bangu	11	4	3	4	8	13	−5	11	
6	América	11	2	7	2	14	15	−1	11	
7	Volta Redonda	11	3	4	4	9	10	−1	10	
8	Americano	11	3	4	4	9	15	−6	10	
9	São Cristóvão	11	2	4	5	8	11	−3	8	
10	Olaria	11	2	4	5	12	16	−4	8	
11	Entrerriense	11	2	3	6	6	13	−7	7	Relegated to Group B
12	América de Três Rios	11	0	3	8	4	21	−17	−7 (Note: América de Três Rios lost ten points for fielding a ineligible player)	Relegated to Group B

Updated to match(es) played on April 12, 1993. Source: RSSSF.com
Rules for classification: 1) points; 2) wins; 3) goal difference; 4) number of goals scored.

==== Group B ====
Pos	Team	Pld	W	D	L	GF	GA	GD	Pts	Qualification or relegation
1	Itaperuna	11	11	0	0	13	1	+12	22	Promoted to Group A
2	Bonsucesso	11	9	1	1	16	5	+11	19	Promoted to Group A
3	Friburguense	11	7	0	4	17	10	+7	14	
4	Barreira	11	6	1	4	12	7	+5	13	
5	Goytacaz	11	4	4	3	10	7	+3	12	
6	Saquarema	11	4	2	5	10	13	−3	10	
7	Serrano	11	2	5	4	11	13	−2	9	
8	Mesquita	11	3	2	6	8	12	−4	8	
9	Portuguesa	11	3	2	6	8	18	−10	8	
10	Madureira	11	2	3	6	10	13	−3	7	
11	Campo Grande	11	2	3	6	10	14	−4	7	
12	Olympico	11	1	1	9	7	19	−12	3	

Updated to match(es) played on April 11, 1993. Source: RSSSF.com
Rules for classification: 1) points; 2) wins; 3) goal difference; 4) number of goals scored.

=== Taça Rio ===
==== Group A ====
Pos	Team	Pld	W	D	L	GF	GA	GD	Pts	Qualification or relegation
1	Vasco da Gama	11	8	2	1	21	9	+12	18	Qualified to Finals
2	Flamengo	11	7	3	1	27	12	+15	17	
3	Bangu	11	5	5	1	12	6	+6	15	
4	Fluminense	11	5	3	3	17	11	+6	13	
5	América	11	5	3	3	14	10	+4	13	
6	Americano	11	2	8	1	13	11	+2	12	
7	Botafogo	11	5	1	5	17	14	+3	11	
8	Olaria	11	3	3	5	7	18	−11	9	
9	Volta Redonda	11	2	5	4	9	12	−3	9	
10	Itaperuna	11	2	5	4	7	11	−4	9	
11	São Cristóvão	11	0	4	7	6	22	−16	4	Relegated
12	Bonsucesso	11	1	0	10	5	19	−14	2	Relegated

Updated to match(es) played on June 6, 1993. Source: RSSSF.com
Rules for classification: 1) points; 2) wins; 3) goal difference; 4) number of goals scored.

==== Group B ====
Pos	Team	Pld	W	D	L	GF	GA	GD	Pts	Qualification or relegation
1	Campo Grande	11	5	6	0	13	5	+8	16	
2	Madureira	11	5	6	0	11	3	+8	16	
3	Saquarema	11	4	5	2	8	5	+3	13	Relegated
4	Portuguesa	11	5	2	4	11	7	+4	12	Relegated
5	Friburguense	11	5	2	4	9	8	+1	12	Relegated
6	Barreira	11	4	2	5	13	13	0	10	Relegated
7	Entrerriense	11	3	4	4	10	8	+2	10	Relegated
8	Olympico	11	3	4	4	8	10	−2	10	Relegated
9	Mesquita	11	3	4	4	3	9	−6	10	Relegated
10	Serrano	11	2	5	4	8	13	−5	9	Relegated
11	Goytacaz	11	2	4	5	10	15	−5	8	Relegated
12	América de Três Rios	11	1	4	6	9	17	−8	6	Relegated

Updated to match(es) played on June 27, 1993. Source: RSSSF.com
Rules for classification: 1) points; 2) wins; 3) goal difference; 4) number of goals scored.

=== Finals ===
Team 1	Series	Team 2	Game 1	Game 2	Game 3
Vasco da Gama	4–3	Fluminense	2–0	1–2	0-0
