= 1990 Campeonato Carioca =

Campeonato Carioca
- Season: 1990
- Champions: Botafogo
- Copa do Brasil: Vasco da Gama; Botafogo
- Série B: América; Bangu; Campo Grande
- Matches: 134
- Goals: 269 (2.01 per match)
- Top goalscorer: Gaúcho (Flamengo) - 14 goals
- Biggest home win: Vasco da Gama 7-0 AA Cabofriense (April 20, 1990)
- Biggest away win: Nova Cidade 0-5 Vasco da Gama (January 31, 1990)
- Highest scoring: Botafogo 5-3 AA Cabofriense (March 28, 1990)

The 1990 edition of the Campeonato Carioca kicked off on January 27, 1990 and ended on July 29, 1990. It is the official tournament organized by FFERJ (Federação de Futebol do Estado do Rio de Janeiro, or Rio de Janeiro State Football Federation. Only clubs based in the Rio de Janeiro State are allowed to play. Twelve teams contested this edition. Botafogo won the title for the 16th time. no teams were relegated.

== System ==
The tournament would be divided in three stages:

- Taça Guanabara: The twelve teams all played in a single round-robin format against each other. The champions qualified to the Final phase.
- Taça Rio: The twelve teams all played in a single round-robin format against each other. The champions qualified to the Final phase.
- Final phase: In the Semifinals, the champions of Taça Guanabara and Taça Rio would play in a single match. the winner would face the team with the best season record in the Finals, also played in a single match.

== Championship ==
=== Copa Guanabara ===
Pos	Team	Pld	W	D	L	GF	GA	GD	Pts	Qualification or relegation
1	Vasco da Gama	11	9	2	0	25	5	+20	20	Qualified to Final phase
2	Botafogo	11	6	5	0	12	5	+7	17	
3	Flamengo	11	5	4	2	19	9	+10	14	
4	Fluminense	11	6	1	4	15	9	+6	13	
5	Itaperuna	11	5	3	3	10	6	+4	13	
6	América	11	5	3	3	7	6	+1	13	
7	Americano	11	4	2	5	9	12	−3	10	
8	Bangu	11	3	4	4	7	10	−3	10	
9	Campo Grande	11	3	3	5	11	16	−5	9	
10	AA Cabofriense	11	2	2	7	5	14	−9	6	
11	América de Três Rios	11	1	4	6	8	13	−5	6	
12	Nova Cidade	11	0	1	10	2	25	−23	1	

Updated to match(es) played on March 11, 1990. Source: RSSSF.com
Rules for classification: 1) points; 2) wins; 3) goal difference; 4) number of goals scored.

=== Copa Rio ===
Pos	Team	Pld	W	D	L	GF	GA	GD	Pts	Qualification or relegation
1	Fluminense	11	6	4	1	15	8	+7	16	Qualified to Final phase
2	Botafogo	11	5	5	1	15	5	+10	15	
3	Flamengo	11	6	2	3	21	11	+10	14	
4	América	11	6	2	3	11	10	+1	14	
5	América de Três Rios	11	5	4	2	12	9	+3	14	
6	Bangu	11	5	2	4	9	9	0	12	
7	Vasco da Gama	11	3	5	3	18	11	+7	11	
8	Americano	11	3	5	3	9	7	+2	11	
9	AA Cabofriense	11	2	4	5	11	20	−9	8	
10	Campo Grande	11	2	4	5	7	13	−6	8	
11	Nova Cidade	11	1	3	7	5	20	−15	5	
12	Itaperuna	11	0	4	7	4	14	−10	4	

Updated to match(es) played on April 29, 1990. Source: RSSSF.com
Rules for classification: 1) points; 2) wins; 3) goal difference; 4) number of goals scored.

=== Aggregate table ===
Pos	Team	Pld	W	D	L	GF	GA	GD	Pts	Qualification or relegation
1	Botafogo	22	11	10	1	27	10	+17	32	Qualified to Final phase
2	Vasco da Gama	22	12	7	3	43	16	+27	31	
3	Fluminense	22	12	5	5	30	17	+13	29	
4	Flamengo	22	11	6	5	40	20	+20	28	
5	América	22	11	5	6	18	16	+2	27	
6	Bangu	22	8	6	8	16	19	−3	22	
7	Americano	22	7	7	8	18	19	−1	21	
8	América de Três Rios	22	6	8	8	20	22	−2	20	
9	Itaperuna	22	5	7	10	14	20	−6	17	
10	Campo Grande	22	5	7	10	18	29	−11	17	
11	AA Cabofriense	22	4	6	12	16	34	−18	14	1991 Group B
12	Nova Cidade	22	1	4	17	7	45	−38	6	1991 Group B

Updated to match(es) played on April 29, 1990. Source: RSSSF.com
Rules for classification: 1) points; 2) wins; 3) goal difference; 4) number of goals scored.

=== Final phase ===
==== Semifinals ====
Team 1	Score	Team 2
Vasco da Gama	1–0	Fluminense
Botafogo	bye	

==== Finals ====
Team 1	Score	Team 2
Botafogo	1–0	Vasco da Gama
