= Campeonato Carioca Série A2 =

Football competition in Brazil

- Organising body: FERJ
- Founded: 1906; 120 years ago
- Country: Brazil
- State: (Rio de Janeiro (state)) Rio de Janeiro
- Level on pyramid: 2
- Promotion to: Campeonato Carioca
- Relegation to: Série B1
- Domestic cup: Copa Rio
- Current champions: Americano (1st title) (2026)
- Most championships: Bonsucesso (7 titles)
- Broadcaster(s): Rede Record; NexTV!
- Website: FERJ Official website

The Campeonato Carioca Série A2 is the second tier of the professional state football league in the Brazilian state of Rio de Janeiro. It is run by the Rio de Janeiro State Football Federation (FERJ).

== List of champions ==
Following is the list with all the champions of the second level of Rio de Janeiro and their different nomenclatures over the years.

=== Distrito Federal do Rio de Janeiro ===
==== Divisão de Acesso ====
Season	Champions	Runners-up
1906	Riachuelo (1)	America

==== Taça Francis Walter ====
Season	Champions	Runners-up
1910	Paissandu (1)	
1911	Bangu (1)	São Cristóvão
1912	CA Guanabara (1)	Alliança
1913	Carioca (1)	Andarahy
1914	Bangu (2)	Andarahy
1915	Andarahy (1)	Palmeiras
1916	Carioca (2)	Vila Isabel
1917	Cattete (1)	Palmeiras
1918	Americano (RJ) (1)	Esperança
1919	Palmeiras (1)	SC Rio de Janeiro
1920	Carioca (3)	Americano (RJ)

==== Segunda Divisão ====
Season	Champions	Runners-up
1921	Bonsucesso (1)	SC Rio de Janeiro
1922	River (1)	São Paulo-Rio
1923	Hellênico (1)	Fidalgo
1924	Not held	
1925	Andarahy (2)	Vila Isabel
1926	Bonsucesso (2)	Everest
1927	Bonsucesso (3)	Carioca
1928	Bonsucesso (4)	Carioca
1929	Carioca (4)	Olaria
1930	Carioca (5)	Engenho de Dentro
1931	Olaria (1)	Mackenzie
1932	Engenho de Dentro (1)	Fluminense B
1933 (AMEA)	Anchieta (1)	Jardim Botânico
1933 (LCF)	São Cristóvão (1)	Madureira
1934 (AMEA)	Brasil Suburbano (1)	Jardim Botânico
1934 (LCF)	Modesto (1)	Jequiá
1935 (FMD)	Confiança (1)	
1935 (LCF)	Engenho de Dentro (2)	
1936 (FMD)	Benfica (1)	
1936 (LCF)	Carbonífera (1)	
1937	Not held	
1938	Olaria (2)	
1939	Portuguesa (1)	
1940	Portuguesa (2)	

=== Estado da Guanabara ===
==== Divisão de Acesso ====
Season	Champions	Runners-up
1965	São Cristóvão (2)	Olaria

=== Estado do Rio de Janeiro ===
==== Divisão de Acesso ====
Season	Champions	Runners-up
1978	Nova Friburgo (1)	Novo Rio
1979	Nova Friburgo (2)	Costeira
1980	Olaria (3)	Madureira
1980	Costeira (1)	Novo Rio

==== Segunda Divisão ====
Season	Champions	Runners-up
1981	Bonsucesso (5)	Portuguesa
1982	Goytacaz (1)	São Cristóvão
1983	Olaria (4)	Friburguense
1984	Bonsucesso (6)	Portuguesa
1985	Campo Grande (1)	Mesquita
1986	Cabofriense (1)	Porto Alegre
1987	Volta Redonda (1)	Friburguense
1988	Nova Cidade (1)	Olaria
1989	América (TR) (1)	Campo Grande
1990	Volta Redonda (2)	Portuguesa
1991	Saquarema (1)	Entrerriense
1992	Serrano (1)	Barreira
1993	Bayer (1)	Barra Mansa

==== Módulo Intermediário ====
Season	Champions	Runners-up
1994	Entrerriense (1)	Friburguense
1995	Barra Mansa (1)	Barra de Teresópolis

==== Módulo Especial ====
Season	Champions	Runners-up
1996	Portuguesa (3)	Barra Mansa
1997	Friburguense (1)	Portuguesa
1998	Cabofriense (2)	Campo Grande

==== Módulo Extra ====
Season	Champions	Runners-up
1999	Serrano (2)	Macaé
2000	Portuguesa (4)	Arraial do Cabo
2001	Entrerriense (2)	CFZ
2002	Cabofriense (3)	Macaé
2003	Portuguesa (5)	Angra dos Reis
2004	Volta Redonda (3)	Boavista

==== Segunda Divisão ====
Season	Champions	Runners-up
2005	Nova Iguaçu (1)	Bangu
2006	Boavista (1)	Macaé
2007	Resende (1)	Mesquita
2008	Bangu (3)	Tigres do Brasil

==== Série B ====
Season	Champions	Runners-up
2009	America (1)	Olaria
2010	Cabofriense (4)	Nova Iguaçu
2011	Bonsucesso (7)	Friburguense
2012	Quissamã (1)	Audax
2013	Cabofriense (5)	Bonsucesso
2014	Barra Mansa (2)	Tigres do Brasil
2015	America (2)	Portuguesa
2016	Nova Iguaçu (2)	Campos AA

==== Série B1 ====
Season	Champions	Runners-up
2017	Goytacaz (2)	America
2018	America (3)	Americano
2019	Friburguense (2)	America
2020	Nova Iguaçu (3)	Sampaio Corrêa

==== Série A2 ====
Season	Champions	Runners-up
2021	Audax (1)	Gonçalense
2022	Volta Redonda (4)	Olaria
2023	Sampaio Corrêa (1)	Olaria
2024	Maricá (1)	Olaria
2025	Bangu (4)	São Gonçalo EC
2026	Americano (1)	Resende

=== Notes ===
- Fidalgo is the currently Madureira EC.
- Porto Alegre is the currently Itaperuna EC.
- Barreira is the currently Boavista SC.
- AA Cabofriense was refounded as AD Cabofriense in 1997 by the same directors with the aim of separating football from the social club activities.
- In 1921 and 1922, respectively, Vila Isabel and Vasco da Gama won the Group B of the LMDT Championship, however, Group B was also officially part of the first level, not being considered these titles of the second division.
- Gonçalense FC is the currently Petrópolis FC.

== Titles by team ==
Teams in bold stills active.

Rank	Club	Winners	Winning years
1	**Bonsucesso**	7	1921, 1926, 1927, 1928, 1981, 1984, 2011
2	**Cabofriense**	5	1986, 1998, 2002, 2010, 2013
2	Carioca	5	1913, 1916, 1920, 1929, 1930
2	**Portuguesa**	5	1939, 1940, 1996, 2000, 2003
5	**Bangu**	4	1911, 1914, 2008, 2025
5	**Olaria**	4	1931, 1938, 1980 (capital), 1983
5	**Volta Redonda**	4	1987, 1990, 2004, 2022
7	**America**	3	2009, 2015, 2018
7	**Nova Iguaçu**	3	2005, 2016, 2020
10	Andarahy	2	1915, 1925
10	**Barra Mansa**	2	1995, 2014
10	Engenho de Dentro	2	1932, 1935 (LCF)
10	Entrerriense	2	1994, 2001
10	**Friburguense**	2	1997, 2019
10	**Goytacaz**	2	1982, 2017
10	Nova Friburgo	2	1978, 1979
10	**São Cristóvão**	2	1933 (LCF), 1965
10	**Serrano**	2	1992, 1999
19	América (TR)	1	1989
19	**Americano**	1	2026
19	Americano (RJ)	1	1918
19	Anchieta	1	1933 (AMEA)
19	**Audax**	1	2021
19	Bayer	1	1993
19	Benfica	1	1936 (FMD)
19	**Boavista**	1	2006
19	Brasil Suburbano	1	1934 (AMEA)
19	CA Guanabara	1	1912
19	**Campo Grande**	1	1985
19	Carbonífera	1	1936 (LCF)
19	Cattete	1	1917
19	Confiança	1	1935 (FMD)
19	Costeira	1	1980 (Interior)
19	Hellênico	1	1923
19	**Maricá**	1	2024
19	Modesto	1	1934 (LCF)
19	**Nova Cidade**	1	1988
19	Paissandu	1	1910
19	Palmeiras	1	1919
19	**Quissamã**	1	2012
19	**Resende**	1	2007
19	Riachuelo	1	1906
19	River	1	1922
19	**Sampaio Corrêa**	1	2023
19	Saquarema	1	1991

=== By city ===
City	Championships	Clubs
Rio de Janeiro	50	Bonsucesso (7), Carioca (5), Portuguesa (5), Bangu (4), Olaria (4), America (3), Andarahy (2), Engenho de Dentro (2), São Cristóvão (2), Americano (RJ) (1), Anchieta (1), Benfica (1), Brasil Suburbano (1), CA Guanabara (1), Campo Grande (1), Carbonífera (1), Cattete (1), Confiança (1), Hellênico (1), Modesto (1), Paissandu (1), Palmeiras (1), Riachuelo (1), River (1)
Cabo Frio	5	Cabofriense (5)
Nova Friburgo	4	Nova Friburgo (2), Friburguense (2)
Volta Redonda	4	Volta Redonda (4)
Campos dos Goytacazes	3	Goytacaz (2), Americano (1)
Nova Iguaçu	3	Nova Iguaçu (3)
Saquarema	3	Boavista (1), Sampaio Corrêa (1), Saquarema (1)
Três Rios	3	Entrerriense (2), América (TR) (1)
Barra Mansa	2	Barra Mansa (2)
Petrópolis	2	Serrano (2)
Belford Roxo	1	Bayer (1)
Maricá	1	Maricá (1)
Nilópolis	1	Nova Cidade (1)
Quissamã	1	Quissamã (1)
Resende	1	Resende (1)
São Gonçalo	1	Costeira (1)
São João de Meriti	1	Audax (1)

== See also ==
- Campeonato Carioca Série A1
- Campeonato Carioca Série B1
- Campeonato Carioca Série B2
