= 1989 Campeonato Carioca =

Campeonato Carioca
- Season: 1989
- Champions: Botafogo
- Relegated: Olaria; Volta Redonda
- Copa do Brasil: Flamengo; Botafogo
- Série B: AA Cabofriense; Porto Alegre; Volta Redonda
- Matches played: 134
- Goals scored: 291 (2.17 per match)
- Top goalscorer: Bebeto (Flamengo) - 18 goals
- Biggest home win: Flamengo 8-1 Nova Cidade (April 16, 1989)
- Biggest away win: Porto Alegre 0-4 Botafogo (March 29, 1989); Fluminense 0-4 Flamengo (April 9, 1989)
- Highest scoring: Flamengo 8-1 Nova Cidade (April 16, 1989)

The 1989 edition of the Campeonato Carioca kicked off on February 11, 1989 and ended on June 21, 1989. It is the official tournament organized by FFERJ (Federação de Futebol do Estado do Rio de Janeiro, or Rio de Janeiro State Football Federation. Only clubs based in the Rio de Janeiro State are allowed to play. Twelve teams contested this edition. Botafogo won the title for the 15th time. Volta Redonda and Olaria were relegated.

== System ==
The tournament would be divided in three stages:

- Taça Guanabara: The twelve teams all played in a single round-robin format against each other. The champions qualified to the Final phase.
- Taça Rio: The twelve teams all played in a single round-robin format against each other. The champions qualified to the Final phase.
- Final phase: In the Semifinals, the champions of Taça Guanabara and Taça Rio would play in a single match. the winner would face the team with the best season record in the Finals, also played in a single match. In case that the same team won two of these stages, the Semifinals wouldn't be necessary and the Finals would be held in two matches.

== Championship ==
=== Taça Guanabara ===
Pos	Team	Pld	W	D	L	GF	GA	GD	Pts	Qualification or relegation
1	Flamengo	11	8	3	0	30	5	+25	19	Qualified to Final phase
2	Botafogo	11	7	4	0	19	3	+16	18	
3	Vasco da Gama	11	6	3	2	14	7	+7	15	
4	Fluminense	11	3	6	2	11	11	0	12	
5	Porto Alegre	11	4	2	5	9	11	−2	10	
6	Americano	11	3	4	4	10	10	0	10	
7	Volta Redonda	11	2	5	4	8	12	−4	9	
8	Bangu	11	2	5	4	9	15	−6	9	
9	América	11	2	4	5	9	13	−4	8	
10	AA Cabofriense	11	2	4	5	9	16	−7	8	
11	Nova Cidade	11	1	6	4	10	23	−13	8	
12	Olaria	11	0	6	5	4	16	−12	6	

Updated to match(es) played on April 23, 1989. Source: RSSSF.com
Rules for classification: 1) points; 2) wins; 3) goal difference; 4) number of goals scored.

=== Copa Rio ===
Pos	Team	Pld	W	D	L	GF	GA	GD	Pts	Qualification or relegation
1	Botafogo	11	7	4	0	17	8	+9	18	Qualified to Final phase
2	Vasco da Gama	11	7	3	1	21	11	+10	17	
3	Flamengo	11	7	2	2	20	10	+10	16	
4	Fluminense	11	6	3	2	17	11	+6	15	
5	Americano	11	5	3	3	8	5	+3	13	
6	Porto Alegre	11	4	4	3	15	13	+2	12	
7	Bangu	11	4	3	4	13	11	+2	11	
8	Nova Cidade	11	2	4	5	5	12	−7	8	
9	América	11	2	3	6	7	13	−6	7	
10	AA Cabofriense	11	1	5	5	10	14	−4	7	
11	Volta Redonda	11	1	3	7	8	20	−12	5	
12	Olaria	11	1	1	9	7	20	−13	3	

Updated to match(es) played on June 14, 1989. Source: RSSSF.com
Rules for classification: 1) points; 2) wins; 3) goal difference; 4) number of goals scored.

=== Aggregate table ===
Pos	Team	Pld	W	D	L	GF	GA	GD	Pts	Qualification or relegation
1	Botafogo	22	14	8	0	36	11	+25	36	Qualified to Final phase
2	Flamengo	22	15	5	2	50	15	+35	35	
3	Vasco da Gama	22	13	6	3	35	18	+17	32	
4	Fluminense	22	9	9	4	28	22	+6	27	
5	Americano	22	8	7	7	18	15	+3	23	
6	Porto Alegre	22	8	6	8	24	24	0	22	
7	Bangu	22	6	8	8	22	26	−4	20	
8	Nova Cidade	22	3	10	9	15	35	−20	16	
9	América	22	4	7	11	16	26	−10	15	
10	AA Cabofriense	22	3	9	10	19	30	−11	15	
11	Volta Redonda	22	3	8	11	16	32	−16	14	Relegated
12	Olaria	22	1	7	14	11	36	−25	9	Relegated

Updated to match(es) played on June 14, 1989. Source: RSSSF.com
Rules for classification: 1) points; 2) wins; 3) goal difference; 4) number of goals scored.

=== Final ===
Team 1	Agg.	Team 2	1st leg	2nd leg
Botafogo	1–0	Flamengo	0–0	1–0
