= Academia de Futebol Pérolas Negras =

Brazilian football club

Pérolas Negras
- Full name: Academia de Futebol Pérolas Negras
- Founded: 2009; 17 years ago
- Ground: Estádio do Trabalhador
- Capacity: 7,400
- President: Rubem Cesar
- Head Coach: Gilmar Estevam
- League: Campeonato Carioca Série A2
- 2025: Carioca Série A2, 8th of 12
- Website: http://academiaperolasnegras.org/
Home colours	Away colours

Academia de Futebol Pérolas Negras, known as Pérolas Negras, is a Brazilian football club based in Resende, Rio de Janeiro state. Founded in 2009, the club played in the Série D once.

== History ==
Founded in 2009 in Haiti by non-governmental organization Viva Rio as a peace mission, the club expanded to Brazil in 2014. They played amateur tournaments until joining the Federação de Futebol do Estado do Rio de Janeiro and winning the 2017 Campeonato Carioca Série C.

Pérolas won finished fourth and third in the 2018 and 2019 editions of the Campeonato Carioca Série B2, respectively, missing out promotion in both occasions. In 2020, the club won the tournament, but remained in a third tier (now called Campeonato Carioca Série B1) after a change in the league structure.

In November 2021, Pérolas Negras won the year's Copa Rio, winning a spot in the 2022 Campeonato Brasileiro Série D.

== Honours ==
- Copa Rio
  - Winners (1): 2021
- Campeonato Carioca Série B1
  - Winners (1): 2020
- Campeonato Carioca Série B2
  - Winners (1): 2017
- Taça Waldir Amaral
  - Winners (2): 2020, 2021
- Taça Maracanã
  - Winners (1): 2021
