= Thiago Leal =

Brazilian footballer

Personal information
- Full name: Thiago Leal Santos
- Date of birth: July 26, 1984 (age 42)
- Place of birth: Brazil
- Height: 1.88 m (6 ft 2 in)
- Position: Goalkeeper

Team information
- Current team: Machine Sazi

Senior career*
Years	Team	Apps	(Gls)
2009–2010	Carregado	13	(0)
2010–2013	Bangu	17	(0)
2014–2015	Barra Mansa	14	(0)
2015–2016	Vila Nova	11	(0)
2016–	Machine Sazi	0	(0)
- * Club domestic league appearances and goals as of 30 May 2016

Thiago Leal Santos (born February 14, 1984) is a Brazilian football goalkeeper, who currently plays for Machine Sazi in the Persian Gulf Pro League.
