= Tomazinho Futebol Clube =

Tomazinho
- Full name: Tomazinho Futebol Clube
- Nickname(s): Cruzmaltino de Meriti; Lobo da baixada
- Founded: January 2, 1930
- Ground: Josião, São João de Meriti, Rio de Janeiro state, Brazil
- Capacity: 3,000
Home colours	Away colours

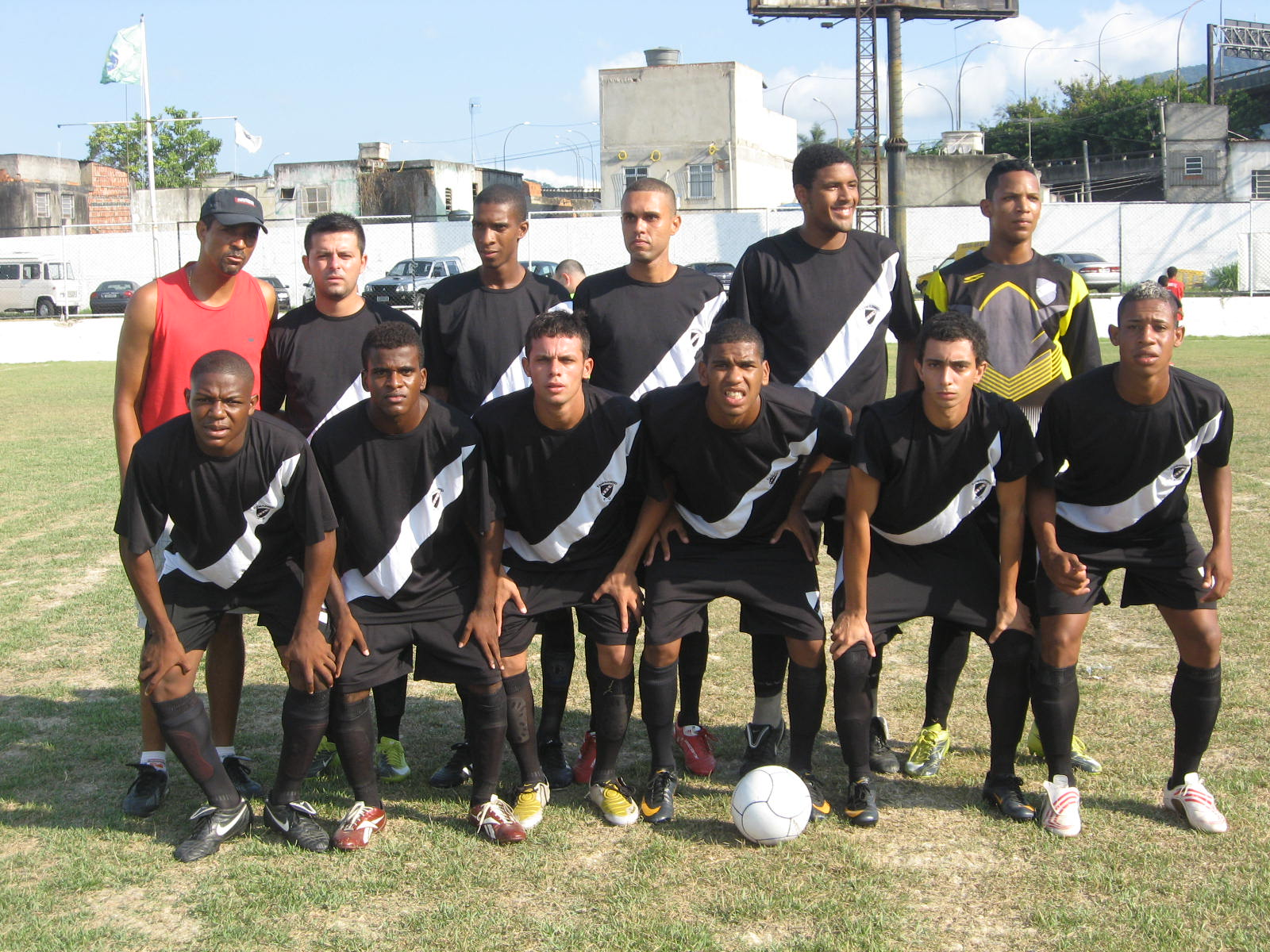
Team photo from the 2011 season

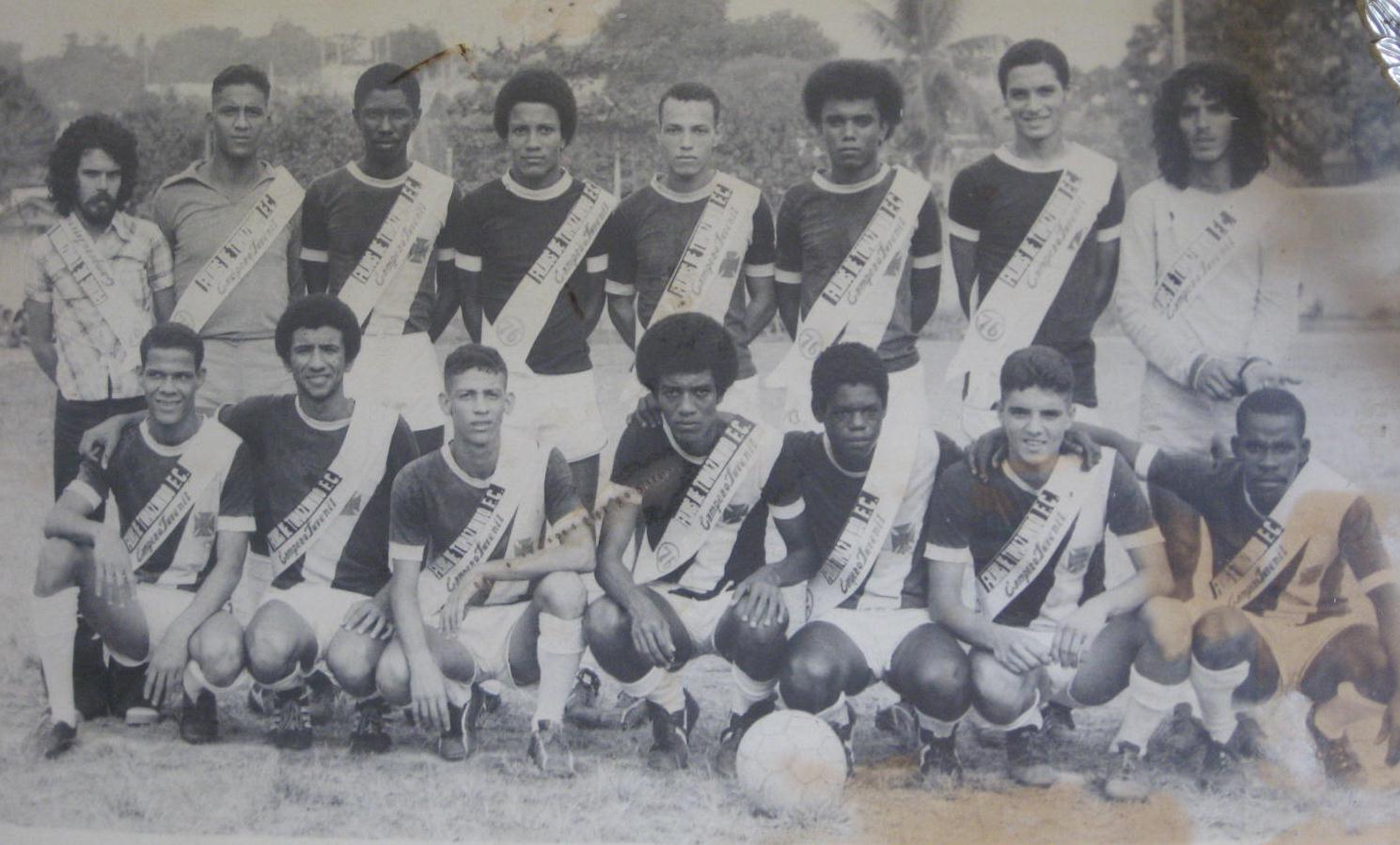
Team photo from the 1976 season

Tomazinho Futebol Clube, commonly known as Tomazinho, is a Brazilian football club based in São João de Meriti, Rio de Janeiro state.

== History ==
The club was founded on January 2, 1930, adopting similar colors and team kits as Club de Regatas Vasco da Gama. Tomazinho won the Campeonato Carioca Third Level in 1986, finish ahead of Nova Cidade.

== Honours ==
- Campeonato Carioca Série B1:
  - Winners (1): 1986

== Stadium ==
Tomazinho Futebol Clube play their home games at Estádio Josias José da Silva, nicknamed Beronhão. The stadium has a maximum capacity of 3,000 people.
