= Thiago Ramos =

Brazilian footballer

Tiago Ramos
Personal information
- Full name: Tiago Ramos Fernandes
- Date of birth: 10 September 1997 (age 29)
- Place of birth: Taguatinga, Distrito Federal, Brazil
- Height: 1.89 m (6 ft 2 1/2 in)
- Position: Striker

Senior career*
Years	Team	Apps	(Gls)
2003–2005	Fluminense		
2005	→ Internacional de Limeira (loan)		
2006	CFZ (RJ)		
2007	C.D. Olivais e Moscavide	1	(0)
2007–2008	UTA Arad	12	(0)
2008–2009	Madureira		
2009	→ Ituano (loan)		
2009	América (RJ)		
2011	Bonsucesso		
2012	São João da Barra		
2013	Vila Nova		
2014	Tigres do Brasil		
2015	São Cristóvão		
2016	Queimados		
- * Club domestic league appearances and goals

Tiago Ramos Fernandes (born 10 September 1997 in Taguatinga, DF) is a Brazilian former footballer.

He signed a three-year contract with Fluminense in March 2003.

In January 2006, he was signed by a company Clube de Futebol do Rio de Janeiro on a 4-year deal.

He left for C.D. Olivais e Moscavide in August 2006.
