= Campeonato Carioca Série B1 =

Football competition in Brazil

- Organising body: FERJ
- Founded: 1914; 111 years ago
- Country: Brazil
- State: (Rio de Janeiro (state)) Rio de Janeiro
- Level on pyramid: 3
- Promotion to: Série A2
- Relegation to: Série B2
- Domestic cup: Copa Rio
- Current champions: Serrano (1st title)
- Most championships: São Gonçalo EC (3 titles)
- Broadcaster(s): Rede Record; NexTV!
- Website: FERJ Official website

The Campeonato Carioca Série B1 is the third tier of the professional state football league in the Brazilian state of Rio de Janeiro. It is run by the Rio de Janeiro State Football Federation (FERJ).

== List of champions ==
Following is the list with all the champions of the third level of Rio de Janeiro and their different nomenclatures over the years.

=== Distrito Federal do Rio de Janeiro ===
==== Terceira Divisão ====
Season	Champions	Runners-up
1914	Vila Isabel (1)	Cattete
1915	Palmeiras (1)	Paladino
1916	Icarahy (1)	Brasil da Praia
1917	Americano (RJ) (1)	Mackenzie
1918	Esperança (1)	Ypiranga
1919	Hellênico (1)	Metropolitano
1920	Metropolitano (1)	Bonsucesso

=== Estado do Rio de Janeiro ===
==== Terceira Divisão ====
Season	Champions	Runners-up
1981	Mesquita (1)	Rubro
1982	Siderantim (1)	Rio Branco
1983	Nacional (1)	Cabofriense
1984	Rio Branco (1)	Royal
1985	Porto Alegre (1)	Central
1986	Tomazinho (1)	Nova Cidade
1987	Paduano (1)	Miguel Couto
1988	América (TR) (1)	Itaguaí
1988	União Nacional (1)	Cantagalo
1989	Rio das Ostras (1)	Tamoio
1990	Ceres (1)	Tupy
1991	Barreira (1)	Porto Real
1992	Anchieta (1)	São Paulo
1993	Apollo (1)	Lucas

==== Segunda Divisão ====
Season	Champions	Runners-up
1994	Nova Iguaçu (1)	Goytacaz
1995	Lucas (1)	Real

==== Divisão Intermediária ====
Season	Champions	Runners-up
1996	Tio Sam (1)	Real
1997	Rio de Janeiro (1)	Cabofriense
1998	Botafogo de Macaé (1)	Cosmos

==== Módulo Especial ====
Season	Champions	Runners-up
1999	Angra dos Reis (1)	Everest
2000	Independente (1)	Anchieta
2001	Rio Branco (2)	Rio das Ostras
2002	Casimiro de Abreu (1)	Artsul
2003	Bonsucesso (1)	Mesquita
2004	CFZ (2)	Independente

==== Terceira Divisão ====
Season	Champions	Runners-up
2005	Estácio de Sá (1)	Rubro
2006	Cardoso Moreira (1)	Silva Jardim
2007	Sendas (1)	Aperibeense
2008	Quissamã (1)	Campo Grande

==== Série C ====
Season	Champions	Runners-up
2009	Sampaio Corrêa (1)	Fênix
2010	São João da Barra (1)	Barra Mansa
2011	Goytacaz (1)	Juventus
2012	Paduano (2)	América (TR)
2013	São Gonçalo EC (1)	Miguel Couto
2014	Gonçalense (1)	São Gonçalo FC
2015	Itaboraí (1)	Artsul
2016	São Gonçalo EC (2)	Serrano

==== Série B2 ====
Season	Champions	Runners-up
2017	Angra dos Reis (2)	Santa Cruz
2018	Nova Cidade (1)	Campos AA
2019	Rio São Paulo (1)	Maricá
2020	Pérolas Negras (1)	7 de Abril

==== Série B1 ====
Season	Champions	Runners-up
2021	Olaria (1)	Pérolas Negras
2022	Araruama (1)	Pérolas Negras
2023	Duque de Caxias (1)	Serrano
2024	São Gonçalo EC (3)	Pérolas Negras
2025	Serrano (1)	Bonscuesso

=== Notes ===
- Porto Alegre is the currently Itaperuna EC.
- Barreira is the currently Boavista SC.
- Botafogo de Macaé is the currently Macaé EFC.
- Independente is the currently Serra Macaense FC
- Rio de Janeiro is the currently CFZ do Rio.
- Sendas is the currently Audax Rio
- AA Cabofriense was refounded as AD Cabofriense in 1997 by the same directors with the aim of separating football from the social club activities.
- Gonçalense FC is the currently Petrópolis FC.

== Titles by team ==
Teams in bold are still active.

Rank	Club	Winners	Winning years
1	**São Gonçalo EC**	3	2013, 2015, 2024
2	**Angra dos Reis**	2	1999, 2017
2	CFZ	2	1997, 2004
2	**Paduano**	2	1987, 2012
2	Rio Branco	2	1984, 2001
6	América (TR)	1	1988 (shared)
6	Americano (RJ)	1	1917
6	Anchieta	1	1992
6	Apollo	1	1993
6	**Araruama**	1	2022
6	**Audax**	1	2007
6	**Boavista**	1	1991
6	**Bonsucesso**	1	2003
6	Cardoso Moreira	1	2006
6	Casimiro de Abreu	1	2002
6	**Ceres**	1	1990
6	**Duque de Caxias**	1	2023
6	Esperança	1	1918
6	Estácio de Sá	1	2005
6	**Gonçalense**	1	2014
6	**Goytacaz**	1	2011
6	Hellênico	1	1919
6	Icarahy	1	1916
6	**Itaboraí**	1	2015
6	Itaperuna	1	1985
6	Lucas	1	1995
6	**Macaé**	1	1998
6	**Mesquita**	1	1981
6	Metropolitano	1	1920
6	Nacional	1	1983
6	**Nova Cidade**	1	2018
6	**Nova Iguaçu**	1	1994
6	**Olaria**	1	2021
6	Palmeiras	1	1915
6	**Pérolas Negras**	1	2020
6	**Quissamã**	1	2008
6	Rio das Ostras	1	1989
6	**Rio São Paulo**	1	2019
6	**Sampaio Corrêa**	1	2009
6	São João da Barra	1	2010
6	**Serra Macaense**	1	2000
6	**Serrano**	1	2025
6	Siderantim	1	1982
6	Tio Sam	1	1996
6	Tomazinho	1	1986
6	União Nacional	1	1988 (shared)
6	Vila Isabel	1	1914

=== By city ===
City	Championships	Clubs
Rio de Janeiro	15	CFZ (2), Americano (RJ) (1), Anchieta (1), Bonsucesso (1), Ceres (1), Esperança (1), Estácio de Sá (1), Hellênico (1), Lucas (1), Metropolitano (1), Olaria (1), Palmeiras (1), Rio São Paulo (1), Vila Isabel (1)
São Gonçalo	4	São Gonçalo EC (3), Gonçalense (1)
Campos dos Goytacazes	3	Rio Branco (2), Goytacaz (1)
Macaé	3	Macaé (1), Serra Macaense (1), União Nacional (1)
Angra dos Reis	2	Angra dos Reis (2)
Duque de Caxias	2	Duque de Caxias (1), Nacional (1)
Niterói	2	Icarahy (1), Tio Sam (1)
Santo Antônio de Pádua	2	Paduano (2)
São João de Meriti	2	Audax (1), Tomazinho (1)
Saquarema	2	Boavista (1), Sampaio Corrêa (1)
Araruama	1	Araruama (1)
Arraial do Cabo	1	Apollo (1)
Barra Mansa	1	Siderantim (1)
Cardoso Moreira	1	Cardoso Moreira (1)
Casimiro de Abreu	1	Casimiro de Abreu (1)
Itaboraí	1	Itaboraí (1)
Itaperuna	1	Itaperuna (1)
Mesquita	1	Mesquita (1)
Nilópolis	1	Nova Cidade (1)
Nova Iguaçu	1	Nova Iguaçu (1)
Petrópolis	1	Serrano (1)
Quissamã	1	Quissamã (1)
Resende	1	Pérolas Negras (1)
Rio das Ostras	1	Rio das Ostras (1)
São João da Barra	1	São João da Barra (1)
Três Rios	1	América (TR) (1)

== See also ==
- Campeonato Carioca Série A1
- Campeonato Carioca Série A2
- Campeonato Carioca Série B2
- Campeonato Carioca Série C
