= Audax Rio de Janeiro Esporte Clube =

Audax Rio
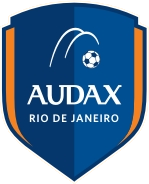
- Full name: Audax Rio de Janeiro Esporte Clube
- Nicknames: Laranja Meritiense; Terror Meritiense
- Founded: 8 May 2005; 21 years ago
- Ground: Estádio Elcyr Resende de Mendonça, Saquarema, Rio de Janeiro State, Brazil
- Capacity: 4,315
- Chairman: Helder Carvalho
- Head coach: Duílio
- League: Campeonato Carioca Série A2
- 2025: Carioca Série A2, 10th of 12
Home colors	Away colors

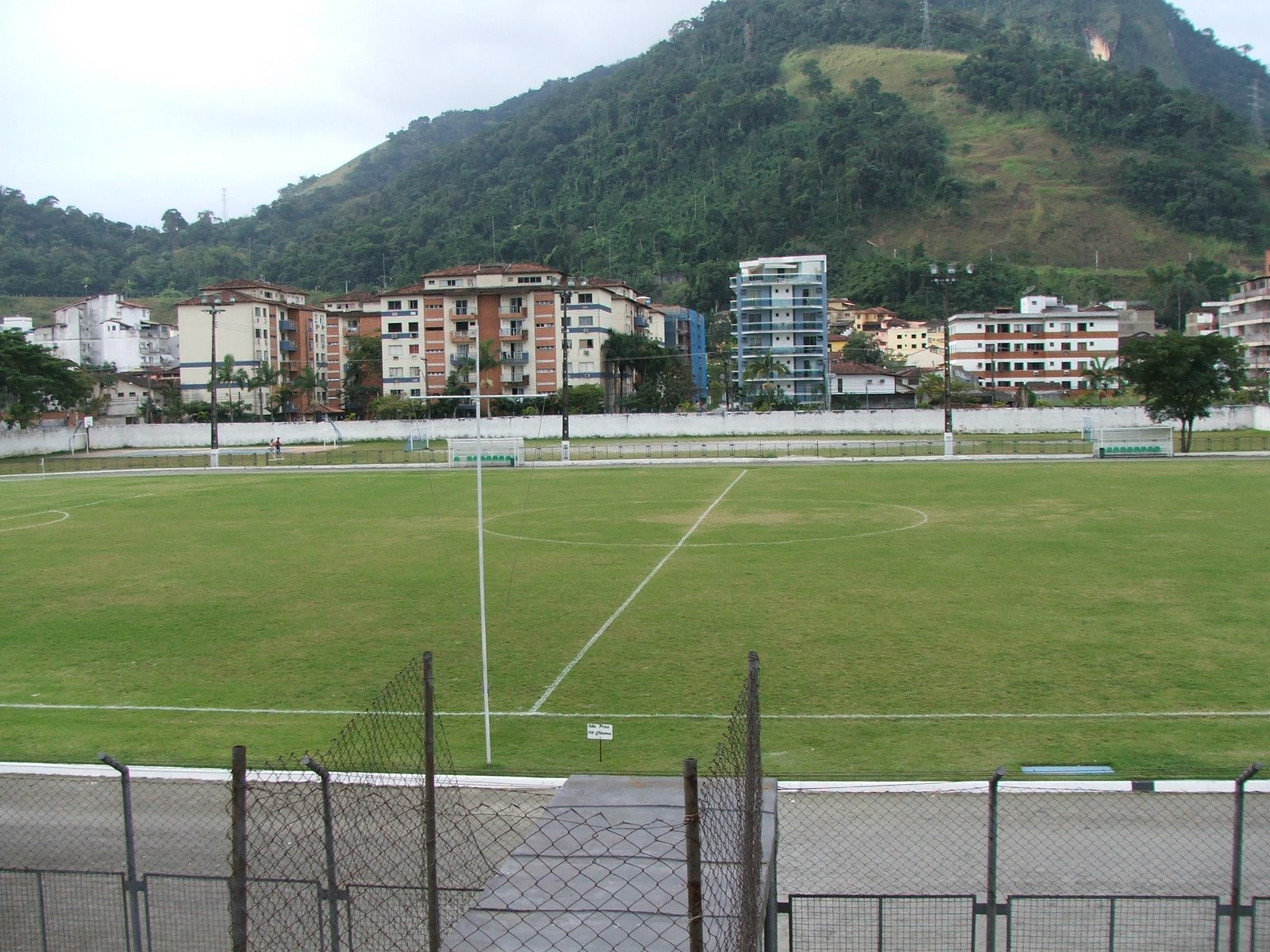
Estádio Jair Toscano, the club's former stadium in Angra dos Reis

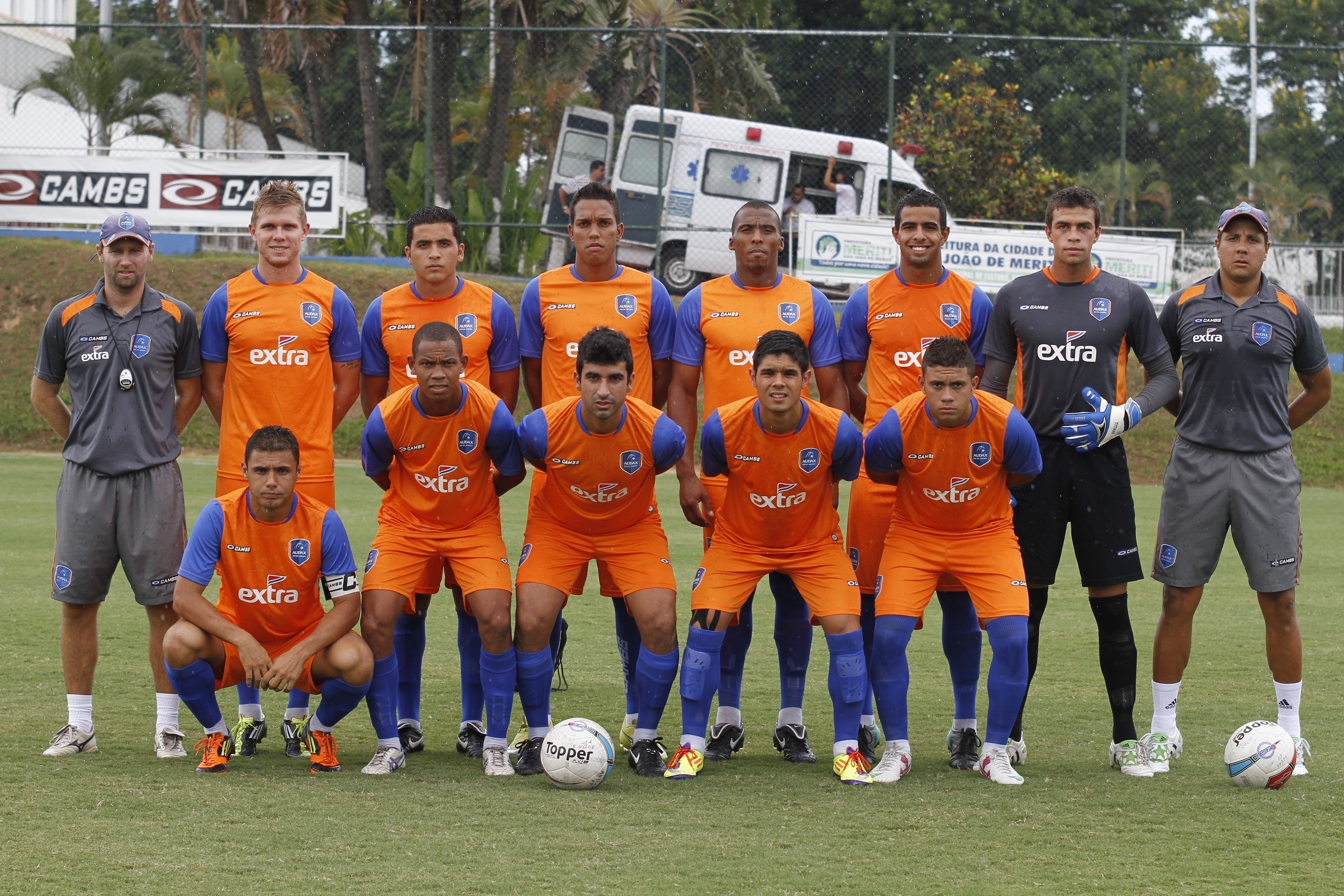
Team photo from the 2012 season

Audax Rio de Janeiro Esporte Clube, commonly known as Audax Rio de Janeiro, Audax Rio, or simply as Audax, is a Brazilian football club from Saquarema, Rio de Janeiro State. They played in São João de Meriti from 2005 to 2019, Miguel Pereira from 2020 to 2021 and Angra dos Reis from 2022 to 2023 before moving to Saquarema in 2024. The club competed in Série D in 2011. The club was formerly known as Sendas Pão de Açúcar Esporte Clube.

== Players ==
Note: Flags indicate national team as defined under FIFA eligibility rules; some limited exceptions apply. Players may hold more than one non-FIFA nationality.

No.	Pos.	Nation	Player
—	DF	BRA	Cassius
—	DF	BRA	Thiago Duchatsch
—	DF	BRA	Julinho
—	DF	BRA	Lucas Rocha
—	MF	BRA	Fernando Medeiros

No.	Pos.	Nation	Player
—	FW	BRA	Anderson Lessa
—	FW	BRA	Carlinhos
—	FW	BRA	Misael
—	FW	BRA	Fidel

== History ==
The club was founded on May 8, 2005, as Sendas Pão de Açúcar Esporte Clube. They won the Campeonato Carioca Third Division in 2007 and the Copa Rio in 2010. They competed in the Série D in 2011.

Sendas Pão de Açúcar Esporte Clube was renamed to Audax Rio de Janeiro Esporte Clube on July 17, 2011, adopting a new logo and new kits. The owner of the club, Grupo Pão de Açúcar, changed the club's name to bring the team closer to its supporters. Audax was eliminated in the First Stage in the 2011. The club finished in the second position in the Campeonato Carioca Second Division in 2012, and was promoted to the 2013 Campeonato Carioca.

== Honours ==
- Copa Rio
  - Winners (1): 2010
- Campeonato Carioca Série A2
  - Winners (1): 2021
- Campeonato Carioca Série B1
  - Winners (1): 2007
- Taça Santos Dumont
  - Winners (1): 2021
- Taça Corcovado
  - Winners (1): 2018
- Torneio Extra Capital
  - Winners (1): 2016

== Stadium ==
Audax Rio de Janeiro Esporte Clube play their home games at Estádio Elcyr Resende de Mendonça, which has a maximum capacity of 4,315 people.
