= Campeonato Carioca Série B2 =

Football competition in Brazil

- Organising body: FERJ
- Founded: 1994; 31 years ago
- Country: Brazil
- State: (Rio de Janeiro (state)) Rio de Janeiro
- Level on pyramid: 4
- Promotion to: Série B1
- Relegation to: Série C
- Domestic cup(s): Copa Rio
- Current champions: Campo Grande (1st title) (2024)
- Most championships: Various
- TV partners: Rede Bandeirantes; RedeTV!
- Website: FERJ Official website

The Campeonato Carioca Série B2 is the fourth tier of the professional state football league in the Brazilian state of Rio de Janeiro. It is run by the Rio de Janeiro State Football Federation (FERJ).

The current version from 2021 of Campeonato Carioca Série B2 is the fourth-highest level. The previous version of the tournament was implemented in 2017 as the third-highest level, replacing the old Série C, which became the state's fourth division.

== List of champions ==
Following is the list with all the champions of the fourth level of Rio de Janeiro and their different nomenclatures over the years.

=== Terceira Divisão ===
Season	Champions	Runners-up
1994	Cardoso Moreira (1)	Jacarepaguá
1995	Tio Sam (1)	Belford Roxo FC

=== Segunda Divisão ===
Season	Champions	Runners-up
1996	Vera Cruz (AR) (1)	Cosmos
1997	Cosmos (1)	Coelho da Rocha
1998	Anchieta (1)	Cruzeiro
1999	Not held	
2000	Casimiro de Abreu (1)	União Central

=== Série C ===
Season	Champions	Runners-up
2017	Pérolas Negras (1)	Campos AA
2018	Mageense (1)	Profute
2019	Ceres (1)	Campo Grande
2020	Not held due to COVID-19 pandemic	

=== Série B2 ===
Season	Champions	Runners-up
2021	Paduano (1)	Araruama
2022	Barra da Tijuca (1)	Goytacaz
2023	São Cristóvão (1)	SE Belford Roxo
2024	Campo Grande (1)	Bonsucesso

== Titles by team ==
Teams in bold stills active.

Rank	Club	Winners	Winning years
1	**Anchieta**	1	1998
1	**Barra da Tijuca**	1	2022
1	**Campo Grande**	1	2024
1	**Cardoso Moreira**	1	1994
1	Casimiro de Abreu	1	2000
1	**Ceres**	1	2019
1	Cosmos	1	1997
1	**Mageense**	1	2018
1	**Paduano**	1	2021
1	**Pérolas Negras**	1	2017
1	**São Cristóvão**	1	2023
1	Tio Sam	1	1995
1	Vera Cruz	1	1996

=== By city ===
City	Championships	Clubs
Rio de Janeiro	5	Anchieta (1), Barra da Tijuca (1), Campo Grande (1), Ceres (1), São Cristóvão (1)
Angra dos Reis	1	Vera Cruz (1)
Cardoso Moreira	1	Cardoso Moreira (1)
Casimiro de Abreu	1	Casimiro de Abreu (1)
Magé	1	Mageense (1)
Niterói	1	Tio Sam (1)
Resende	1	Pérolas Negras (1)
Santo Antônio de Pádua	1	Paduano (1)
São Gonçalo	1	Cosmos (1)

== See also ==
- Campeonato Carioca Série A1
- Campeonato Carioca Série A2
- Campeonato Carioca Série B1
- Campeonato Carioca Série C
