= Campeonato Fluminense =

Former football league in Brazil

The Campeonato Fluminense was the football league of the Brazilian state of Rio de Janeiro, Brazil, when the city of Rio de Janeiro was not part of the state of the same name, and instead was the federal district as the Brazilian capital until 1960, when Brasília was built and the new federal district became the capital, and then the city of Rio de Janeiro was the state of Guanabara.

In 1975 the states of Rio de Janeiro and Guanabara were merged by the military regime, forming the present day state of Rio de Janeiro, with the city of the same name as the capital of the newly enlarged state replacing Niterói, but the Campeonato Fluminense continued separately until 1978, after which all its clubs joined the city league, the Campeonato Carioca.

As most of the big clubs in the Campeonato Carioca have come from the city of Rio de Janeiro, the clubs outside the city have rarely contended for the state title since the merger; only two clubs, Americano and Volta Redonda, came close to winning the Campeonato Carioca title, settling for runner-up in 2002 and 2005 respectively.

== List of Champions ==
=== Amateur era ===
The first Campeonato Fluminense was disputed in 1915, right after the foundation of LSF (the first state football association). In 1928, the clubs were replaced by city XI teams, and the champion league represented the state. From 1941 to 1945 FFD (former AFEA) replaced the city XI teams by clubs. In 1946 the clubs were again replaced by city XI teams. These were the state champions clubs in the amateur era:

- 1915 - Ararigboya (Niterói)
- 1916 - Parnahyba (Niterói)
- 1917 - Odeon (Niterói)
- 1918 - Nictheroyense (Niterói)
- 1919 - Fluminense (Niterói)
- 1920 - Fluminense (Niterói)
- 1921 - Barreto (Niterói)
- 1922 - Byron (Niterói)
- 1923 - Barreto (Niterói)
- 1924 - Byron (Niterói)
- 1924 - Byron (Niterói) - extra championship
- 1925 - Serrano (Petrópolis) - AFEA championship
- 1925 - Byron (Niterói) - LSF championship
- 1926 - Elite (Niterói)
- 1927 - Gragoatá (Niterói)
- 1928 - Niterói team
- 1928 - Niterói team
- 1930 - Niterói team
- 1931 - Niterói team
- 1932 - not disputed
- 1933 - not disputed
- 1934 - Barra do Piraí team
- 1935 - Niterói team
- 1936 - Campos team
- 1937 - not disputed
- 1938 - Niterói team
- 1939 - Campos team
- 1940 - Campos and Nova Friburgo team
- 1941 - Icaraí (Niterói)
- 1942 - Royal (Barra do Piraí)
- 1943 - Icaraí (Niterói)
- 1944 - Petropolitano (Petrópolis)
- 1945 - Serrano (Petrópolis)
- 1946 - not held
- 1947 - Campos team
- 1948 - Petrópolis team
- 1949 - Petrópolis team
- 1950 - Barra do Piraí team
- 1951 - Barra do Piraí team

=== Professional era ===
In 1951, FFD (Federação Fluminense de Desportos) formed a professional department (the D.E.P.), which carried out the first professional club state championship. Since then the state championship was disputed by the professional champions of each region. From 1959 on, the Fluminense champions had berths in the Taça Brasil, but neither the later Roberto Gomes Pedrosa tournament and its successor, the Campeonato Brasileiro, awarded berths to the Fluminense champions.

- 1952 - Adrianino (Engenheiro Paulo de Frontin)
- 1952 - Adrianino (Engenheiro Paulo de Frontin) - extra championship
- 1953 - Barra Mansa FC (Barra Mansa)
- 1953 - Barra Mansa FC (Barra Mansa) (Superchampionship)
- 1954 - Coroados (Valença)
- 1955 - Frigorífico (Mendes)
- 1955 - Goytacaz FC (Campos) (Superchampionship)
- 1956 - not finished
- 1957 - not finished
- 1958 - Manufatora (Niterói)
- 1959 - Fonseca AC (Niterói)
- 1960 - Fonseca AC (Niterói)
- 1961 - Rio Branco (Campos)
- 1962 - Fonseca AC (Niterói)
- 1963 - Goytacaz FC (Campos)
- 1964 - Americano FC (Campos)
- 1964 - Eletrovapo (Niterói) (Superchampionship)
- 1965 - Americano FC (Campos)
- 1966 - Goytacaz FC (Campos)
- 1967 - Goytacaz FC (Campos)
- 1968 - Americano FC (Campos)
- 1969 - Americano FC (Campos)
- 1970 - Central (Barra do Piraí)
- 1971 - Central (Barra do Piraí)
- 1972 - Barbará (Barra Mansa)
- 1973 - Barbará (Barra Mansa)
- 1974 - Sapucaia (Campos)
- 1975 - Americano FC (Campos)

In 1975, although the Rio de Janeiro and Guanabara states had already fused, the federations were still separate. The FFD organized the Countryside State Championship:

- 1976 - Central (Barra do Piraí)
- 1977 - Manufatora (Niterói)

In 1978, the federations merged into the new FERJ. However, on this year FERJ still organized a Countryside Championship, considered the last Campeonato Fluminense:

- 1978 - Goytacaz FC (Campos)

== Titles by team ==
- Americano FC - 5
- Goytacaz FC - 5
- Byron - 4
- Fonseca AC - 3
- Adrianino AC - 2
- Central SC - 2
- Fluminense AC - 2
- AA Barbará - 2
- Icaraí FC - 2
- AD Niterói (as Manufatora AC) - 2
- Serrano FC - 2
- Barra Mansa FC - 2
- Barreto - 2
- Coroados FC - 1
- AE Eletrovapo - 1
- SC Elite - 1
- Frigorífico AC - 1
- GR Gragoatá - 1
- Petropolitano FC - 1
- CE Rio Branco - 1
- Royal SC - 1
- EC Sapucaia - 1
- Nictheroyense - 1
- Odeon - 1
- Parnahyba - 1
- Ararigboya - 1

== See also ==
- Campeonato Carioca
- Campeonato da Cidade de Niterói
- Campeonato da Cidade de Campos
