= Fênix 2005 Futebol Clube =

Fênix
- Full name: Fênix 2005 Futebol Clube
- Nicknames: Fênix; Tricolor do Sul
- Founded: September 9, 2005
- Ground: Estádio Raulino de Oliveira, Barra Mansa, Rio de Janeiro state, Brazil
- Capacity: 20,000
Home colours	Away colours

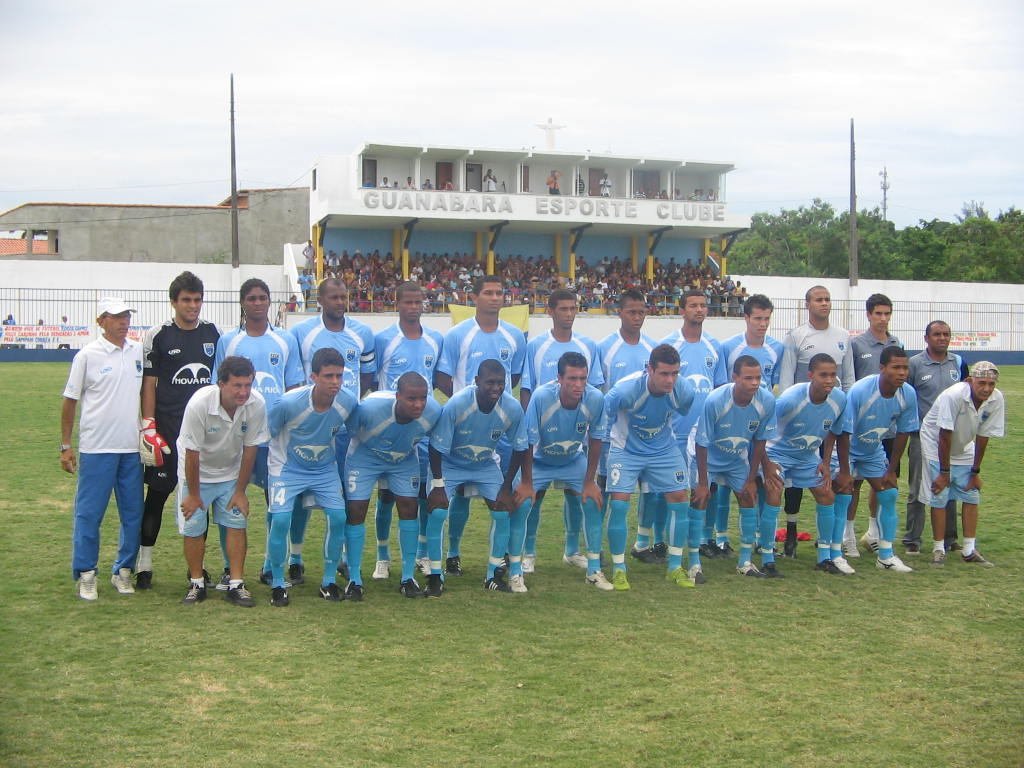
Team photo from the 2005 season

Fênix 2005 Futebol Clube, commonly known as Fênix, is a Brazilian football club based in Barra Mansa, in the state of Rio de Janeiro.

== History ==
The club was founded on September 9, 2005. They finished as the runners-up in the Campeonato Carioca Third level in 2009, losing the competition to Sampaio Corrêa.

== Stadium ==
Fênix 2005 Futebol Clube play their home games at Estádio Raulino de Oliveira. The stadium has a maximum capacity of 20,000 people.
