= Maricá Futebol Clube =

Maricá
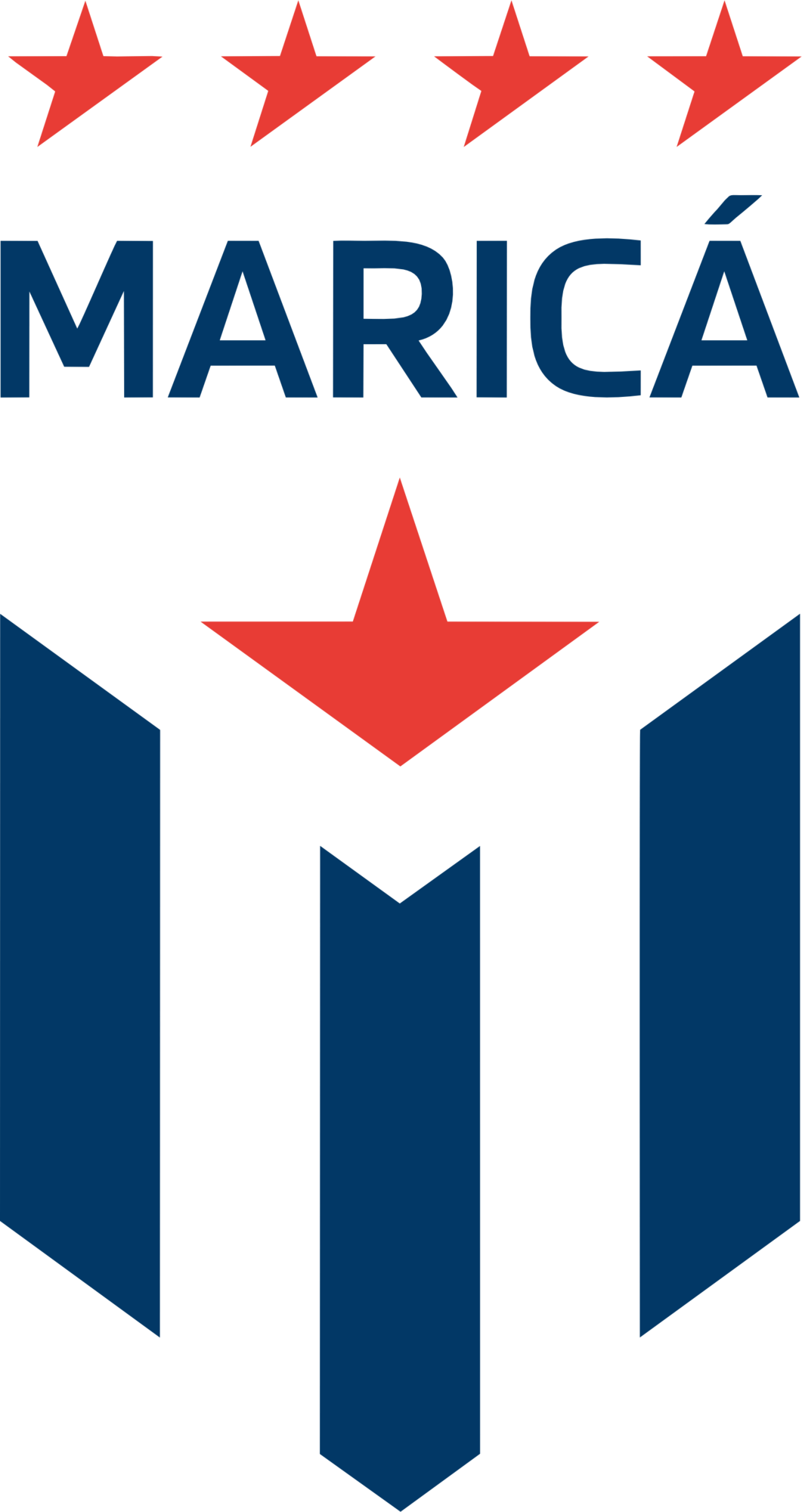
- Full name: Maricá Futebol Clube
- Nickname: Maricaense
- Founded: 2 August 2001; 24 years ago
- Chairman: Ayrthon Dias
- Manager: Reinaldo
- League: Campeonato Brasileiro Série D Campeonato Carioca
- 2025 2025: Série D, 31st of 64; Carioca, 10th of 12
- Website: https://www.facebook.com/MaricaFutebolClubeOficial/
Home colours	Away colours	Third colours

Maricá Futebol Clube, better known as Maricá, is a sports association in the city of Maricá, in the state of Rio de Janeiro. Founded on 2 August 2001 as a Rio de Janeiro Football Club, between 2017 and 2018 the football club competed under the name of Rio de Janeiro/Maricá. On 16 July 2018, the merger was made official and the name changed to Maricá Futebol Clube. The headquarters were also changed, moving from Magé to Maricá.

== History ==
=== Clube de Futebol Rio de Janeiro (2001–2017) ===
The Rio de Janeiro Football Club, initially conceived as the Grande Rio Sports Association, had been competing in the grassroots competitions for twelve years, but the name and registration were only formalized in 2002. The club is one of the greatest opportunities for young football talent in Piabetá. It has an eight-field training center. It was founded by professor Ênio Farias.

In 2009, they won the Third Division of Rio de Janeiro junior category.

=== Present years ===
Founded in 2017, the club was conceived by Douglas Almeida, a football manager with a stint in Araruama. The club came about to bring back professional football to the city of Maricá after 2005 when Taquaral competed in the Rio Cup.

The club partnered with the Rio de Janeiro Football Club to compete in the Campeonato Carioca Serie B2 in its founding year. The goal is to follow the path of other partnerships that worked in Rio football, such as the partnership between Campos Atlético Associação and Carapebus, a partnership between Arraial do Cabo and Araruama and the partnership between Santa Cruz and Belford Roxo.

After announcing the manager Polaco Valoura for the State's B2 series, Maricá confirmed the names of 24 players. The definition of the squad came shortly after the evaluations the newly created club carried out in the city of Maricá. Their first official game took place on May 28, 2017, against Angra dos Reis, ending tied at 2-2.

== Honours ==
- Copa Rio
  - Winners (1): 2024
- Campeonato Carioca Série A2
  - Winners (1): 2024
- Taça Santos Dumont
  - Winners (1): 2024
- Taça Corcovado
  - Winners (1): 2020

== Squad ==
Note: Flags indicate national team as defined under FIFA eligibility rules; some limited exceptions apply. Players may hold more than one non-FIFA nationality.

No.	Pos.	Nation	Player
—	GK	BRA	Junior Souza
—	GK	BRA	Evayr
—	GK	BRA	Vinicius
—	DF	BRA	Thiago Carioca
—	DF	BRA	Matheus
—	DF	BRA	Jean
—	DF	BRA	Índio
—	DF	BRA	Alex Lopes
—	DF	BRA	Rhenan
—	DF	BRA	Pablo
—	DF	BRA	Alex
—	DF	BRA	Bruno Santos
—	DF	BRA	Guilherme Costa
—	DF	URU	Felipe Carvalho
—	MF	BRA	Angelo Renan
—	MF	BRA	Fabiano
—	MF	BRA	Bruno Medeiros
—	MF	BRA	Rykellerson

No.	Pos.	Nation	Player
—	MF	BRA	Marcos Paulo
—	MF	BRA	Allan
—	MF	BRA	Maycon
—	MF	BRA	Lázaro
—	MF	BRA	Badola
—	MF	BRA	Júlio César
—	MF	BRA	Joel
—	MF	BRA	Paulinho Fernandes
—	MF	BRA	Richard
—	MF	BRA	Rodrigo
—	MF	ECU	Kevin Mercado
—	FW	BRA	Pablo Luiz
—	FW	BRA	Rafael Castro
—	FW	BRA	João Manoel
—	FW	BRA	Felipe Zuca
—	FW	ECU	Johan Mina
—	FW	ARG	Matías Roskopf

== See also ==
- Brazilian football clubs
