= Esporte Clube São João da Barra =

São João da Barra
- Full name: Esporte Clube São João da Barra
- Founded: July 31, 2009
- Ground: Estádio Municipal Manoel José Viana de Sá, São João da Barra, Rio de Janeiro state, Brazil
- Head coach: Andrade
| Home colors | Away colors |

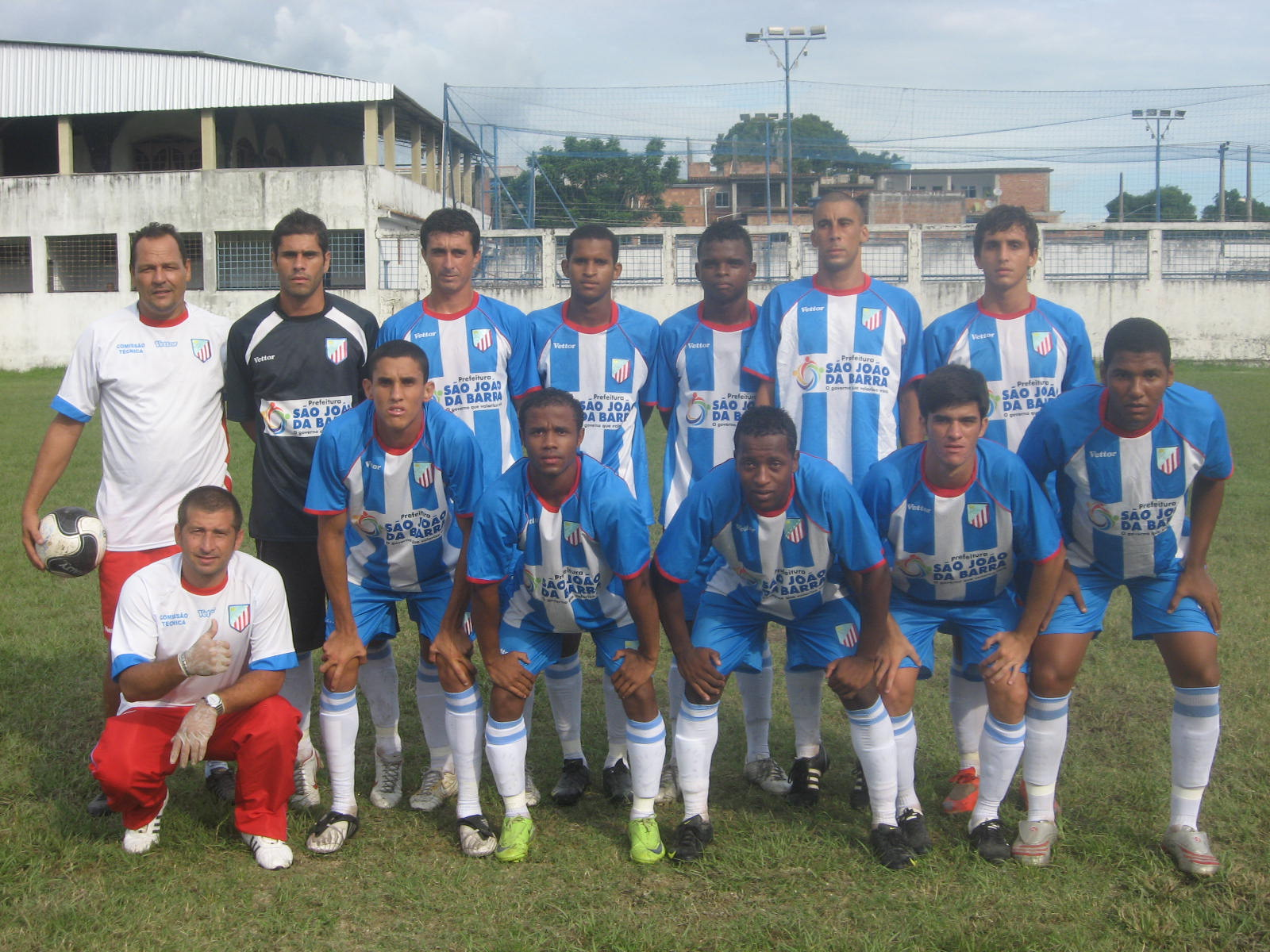
Team photo from the 2010 season

Esporte Clube São João da Barra, commonly known as São João da Barra, is a Brazilian football club based in São João da Barra, Rio de Janeiro state.

== History ==
The club was founded on July 31, 2009. São João da Barra won the Campeonato Carioca Third level in 2010, after beating Barra Mansa in the final.

== Honours ==
- Campeonato Carioca Série B1
  - Winners (1): 2010
- Torneio Interior
  - Winners (1): 2014

== Stadium ==
Esporte Clube São João da Barra play their home games at Estádio Municipal Manoel José Viana de Sá.
