= Pingo (footballer, born 1960) =

Brazilian footballer (born 1960)

Personal information
- Full name: Paulo Rogério da Silva
- Date of birth: 8 February 1960 (age 66)
- Place of birth: Brazil
- Height: 1.68 m (5 ft 6 in)
- Position: Midfielder

Senior career*
Years	Team	Apps	(Gls)
1980–1984	Campo Grande		
1985	Bangu	29	(8)
1986	Campo Grande		
1986–1989	Espinho	71	(20)
1989–1990	Porto	5	(0)
1990–1991	Braga	31	(7)
1991–1992	Aves	33	(4)
1992–1993	Espinho	15	(1)
1994	Paysandu	1	(0)
1995	São Mateus		
- * Club domestic league appearances and goals

Paulo Rogério da Silva (born 8 February 1960) is a Brazilian former professional footballer who played as a midfielder.

== Career ==
Pingo started his career with Portuguese side Campo Grande. In 1985, he signed for Brazilian side Bangu. He helped the club achieve second place in the league. In 1986, he returned to Brazilian side Campo Grande. After that, he signed for Brazilian side Espinho. In 1989, he signed for Portuguese side Porto. In 1990, he signed for Portuguese side Braga. In 1991, he signed for Portuguese side Aves. In 1992, he returned to Portuguese side Espinho. In 1994, he signed for Brazilian side Paysandu. In 1995, he signed for Brazilian side São Mateus.

== Style of play ==
Pingo mainly operated as a midfielder. He was described as having "incredible skill... an expert in laboratory moves... an unusual intelligence".

== Personal life ==
After retiring from professional football, Pingo worked as a football manager. He is a native of Rio de Janeiro, Brazil.
