= Clube Esportivo Rio Branco =

Brazilian football club

Rio Branco
- Full name: Clube Esportivo Rio Branco
- Nickname(s): Róseo-Negro
- Founded: 5 November 1912
- Ground: Milton Barbosa
- Capacity: 3,000
Home colours	Away colours

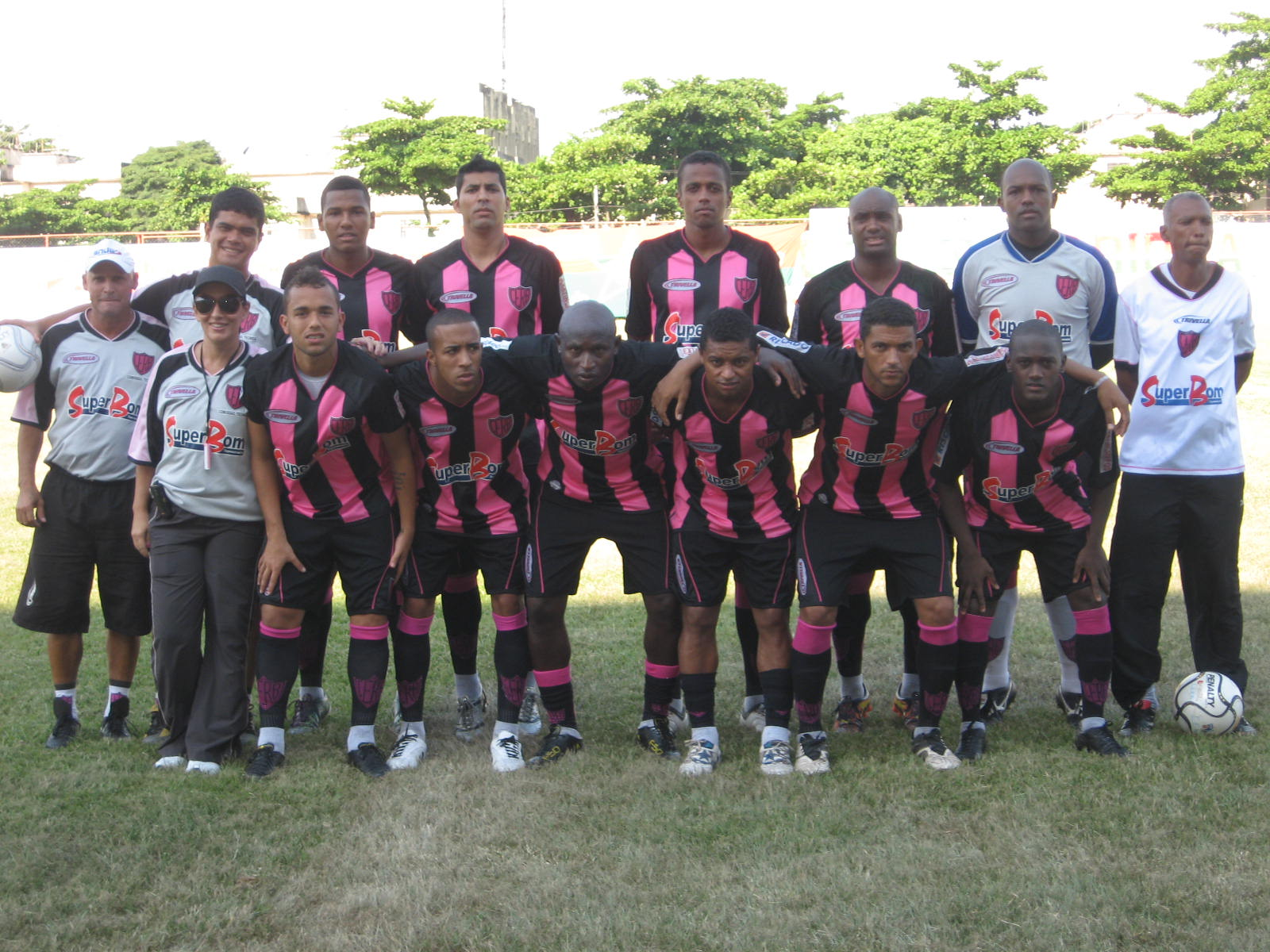
Team photo from the 2011 season

Clube Esportivo Rio Branco, usually known simply as Rio Branco (or Rio Branco-RJ) is a Brazilian football team from the city of Campos dos Goytacazes, Rio de Janeiro state, founded on November 5, 1912.

== History ==
On November 5, 1912, the club was founded by youngsters after the Baron of Rio Branco, who died in the same year. The team participated on the Campeonato Brasileiro Série C once, in 2003.

== Honours ==
=== State ===
- Campeonato Fluminense
  - Winners (1): 1961
- Campeonato Carioca Série B1
  - Winners (2): 1984, 2001

=== City ===
- Campeonato da Cidade de Campos
  - Winners (8): 1917, 1928, 1929, 1931, 1949, 1958, 1961, 1962
- Taça Cidade de Campos
  - Winners (2): 1972, 1976

== Stadium ==
The home stadium Estádio Milton Barbosa is also known as Calabouço (meaning dungeon).

== Colors ==
The official colors are pink and black.
