= Três Rios =

- Municipality
- Município de Três Rios
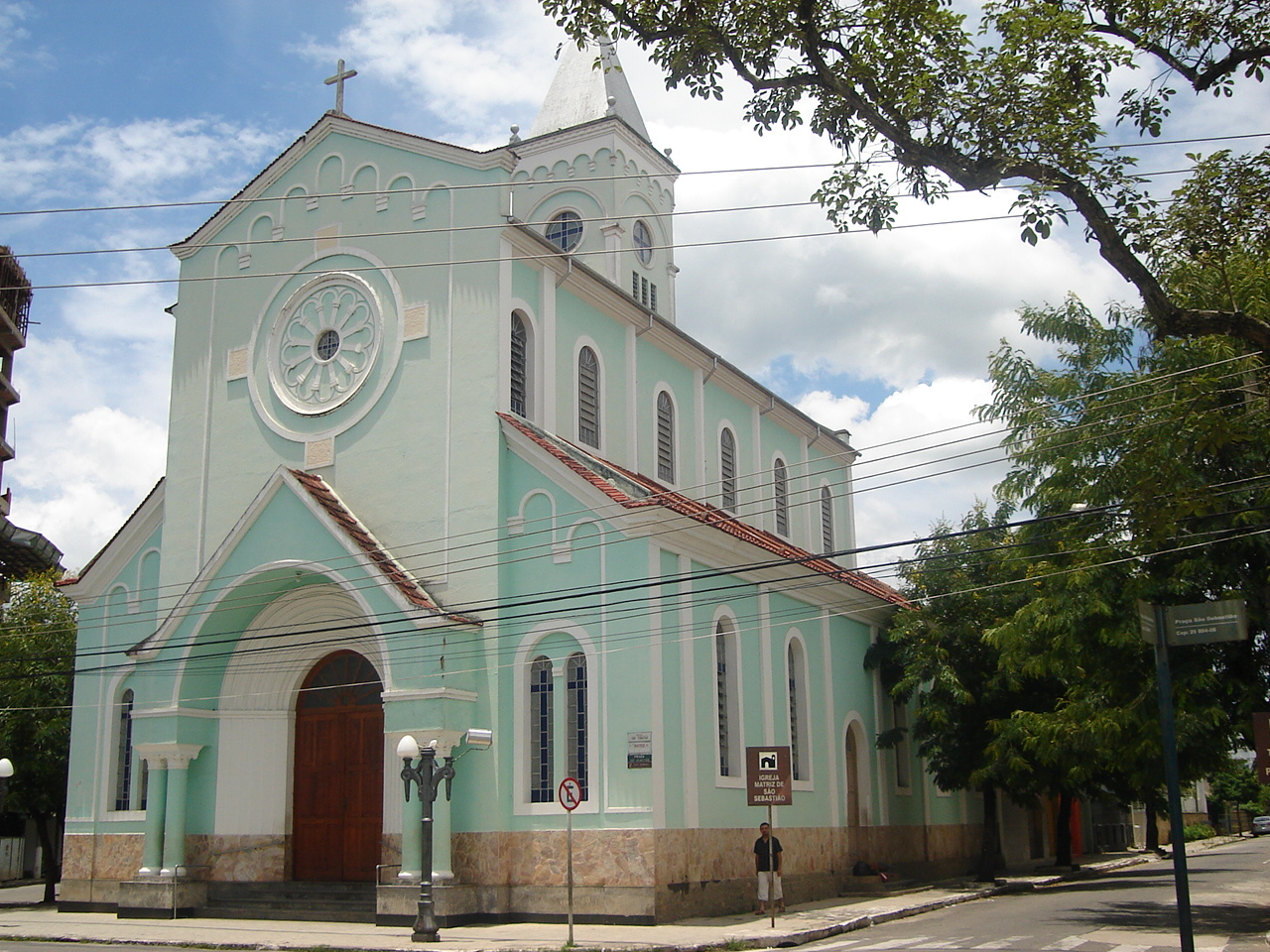
- Roman Catholic Church of Saint Sebastian (Igreja de São Sebastião)

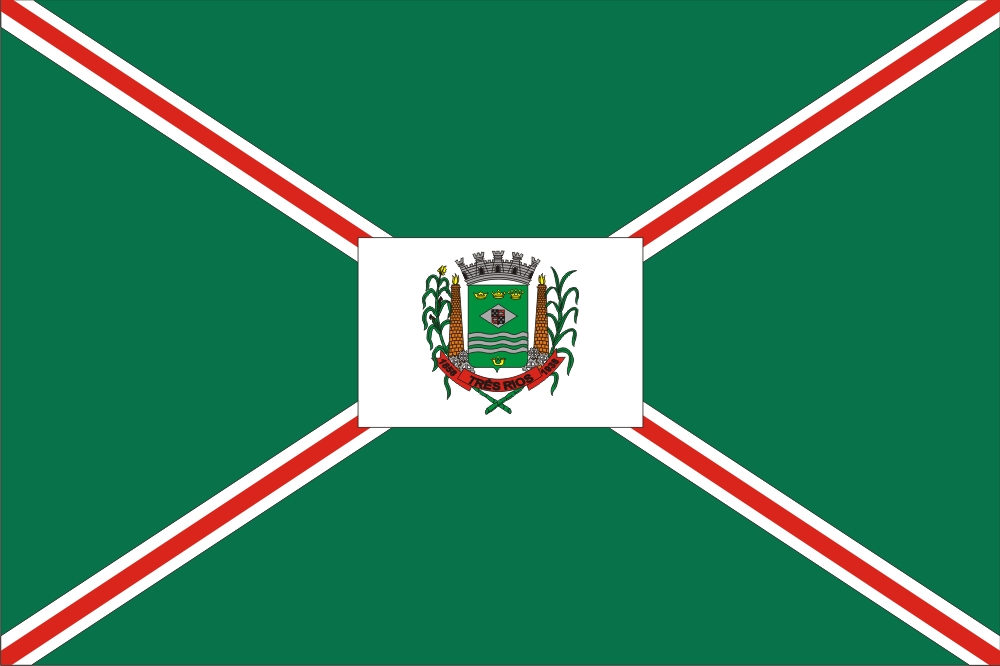
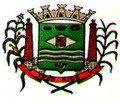
- Flag Coat of arms
- Nickname: Esquina do Brasil (street corner of Brazil)
- Location of Três Rios in the state of Rio de Janeiro

- Location of Três Rios in Brazil
- Coordinates: 22°07′01″S 43°12′32″W
- Country: Brazil
- Region: Southeast
- State: Rio de Janeiro

Government
  - Mayor: Joacir Barbaglio Pereira (Liberal Party)

Area
  - Total: 326.566 km^{2} (126.088 sq mi)
- Elevation: 275 m (902 ft)

Population (2010)
  - Total: 77,432
  - Estimate (2020): 82,142
  - Density: 237.11/km^{2} (614.11/sq mi)
- Time zone: UTC−3 (Brasília Time)
- Website: http://www.tresrios.rj.gov.br (in Portuguese)

Três Rios (Portuguese pronunciation: [ˈtɾe(j)z ˈʁi.us]) is a municipality located in the Brazilian state of Rio de Janeiro. As of 2020 its population was an estimated 82,142 inhabitants, and its area is around 322 square kilometres (124 sq mi). The current mayor of Três Rios is Joacir Barbaglio Pereira (known as Joa) of the Liberal Party, elected in 2020 to a four-year term.

The name Três Rios, meaning "three rivers" in Portuguese, is a reference to the three important rivers in the area: the Paraíba do Sul, the Piabanha, and the Paraibuna. The city itself is located on the Paraíba, and the three rivers meet downstream, to the east. The name "Esquina do Brasil" (lit. 'street corner of Brazil') was inspired by the words of former president Juscelino Kubitschek, referring to the major highways that pass through.

Três Rios hosts a campus of the Federal Rural University of Rio de Janeiro (UFRRJ), called the Instituto Três Rios, which offers four undergraduate programs.

== Sports ==
There are three sport clubs in the city. América, Entrerriense and Três Rios Futebol Clube. América's football section is currently closed, but the club still disputes basketball competitions. Entrerriense and Três Rios FC's football sections are currently active. Três Rios is currently disputing Campeonato Carioca Third Level.
