= Araruama Futebol Clube =

Araruama
- Full name: Araruama Futebol Clube
- Founded: February 6, 2016; 9 years ago
- Ground: Correão, Rio de Janeiro, Brazil
- Capacity: 12,000
- Chairman: Álvaro Michele Conte Fernando Captain Mor Vithor Nametala
- Manager: Thiago Jardim
- League: Série B2
- Website: https://araruamafc.com.br/ (in Portuguese)
Home colours	Away colours

Araruama Futebol Clube, better known as Araruama, is a football club in the city of Araruama, Rio de Janeiro. The team currently plays in the Série B2.

== History ==
Conceived and founded on June 2, 2016 by three medical friends from the city of Araruama who played football for fun, came the idea of creating a professional club after the departure of the last professional club in the city. In order to occupy this gap left in the city, the three friends came together and developed the project, joining a professional club Arraial do Cabo (CEAC) with Araruama Futebol Clube. The elaboration of a team made up of local players is a recipe for success. For years, championship after championship, the city attracted fans who continued to support and make a healthy movement, a cause of joy and leisure for city dwellers. The AFC comes to supply this absence and add its existence in the history of the city's sport. At times the stories of football and the city of Araruama mix. In the 1960s, the mayor of the city of the time was a defender of a professional team (article published by the newspaper O GLOBO). The city has already had the honor of having as player Sinval, athlete who played for the Brazil national team, who died in 2012, in which a tribute was paid to the player in one of the games of the state of that year. Araruama F.C. competes in the Campeonato Carioca Profissional de Série B2 of professionals and in the category of juniors.

== Honours ==
- Campeonato Carioca Série B1
  - Winners (1): 2022
- Taça Maracanã
  - Winners (1): 2022

== See also ==
- Brazilian football clubs
