= Barra Mansa Futebol Clube =

Barra Mansa
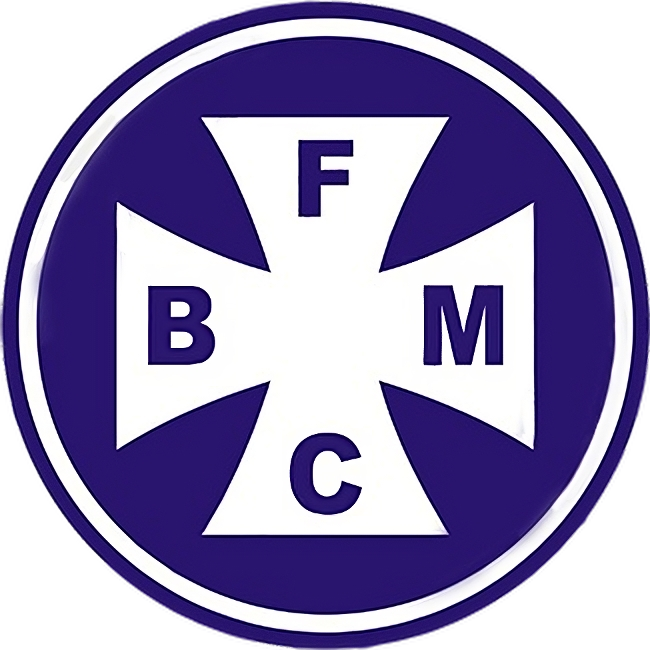
- Full name: Barra Mansa Futebol Clube
- Nickname(s): Leão do Sul; BMFC; Campeão do Vale; Barrão; Supercampeão Fluminense
- Founded: November 15, 1908 (116 years ago)
- Ground: Estádio Leão do Sul, Barra Mansa, Rio de Janeiro state, Brazil
- Capacity: 6,000
- President: Sebastião Genivaldo da Silva
- Head coach: Thiago Campbell
- Website: www.barramansafc.com
Home colors	Away colors

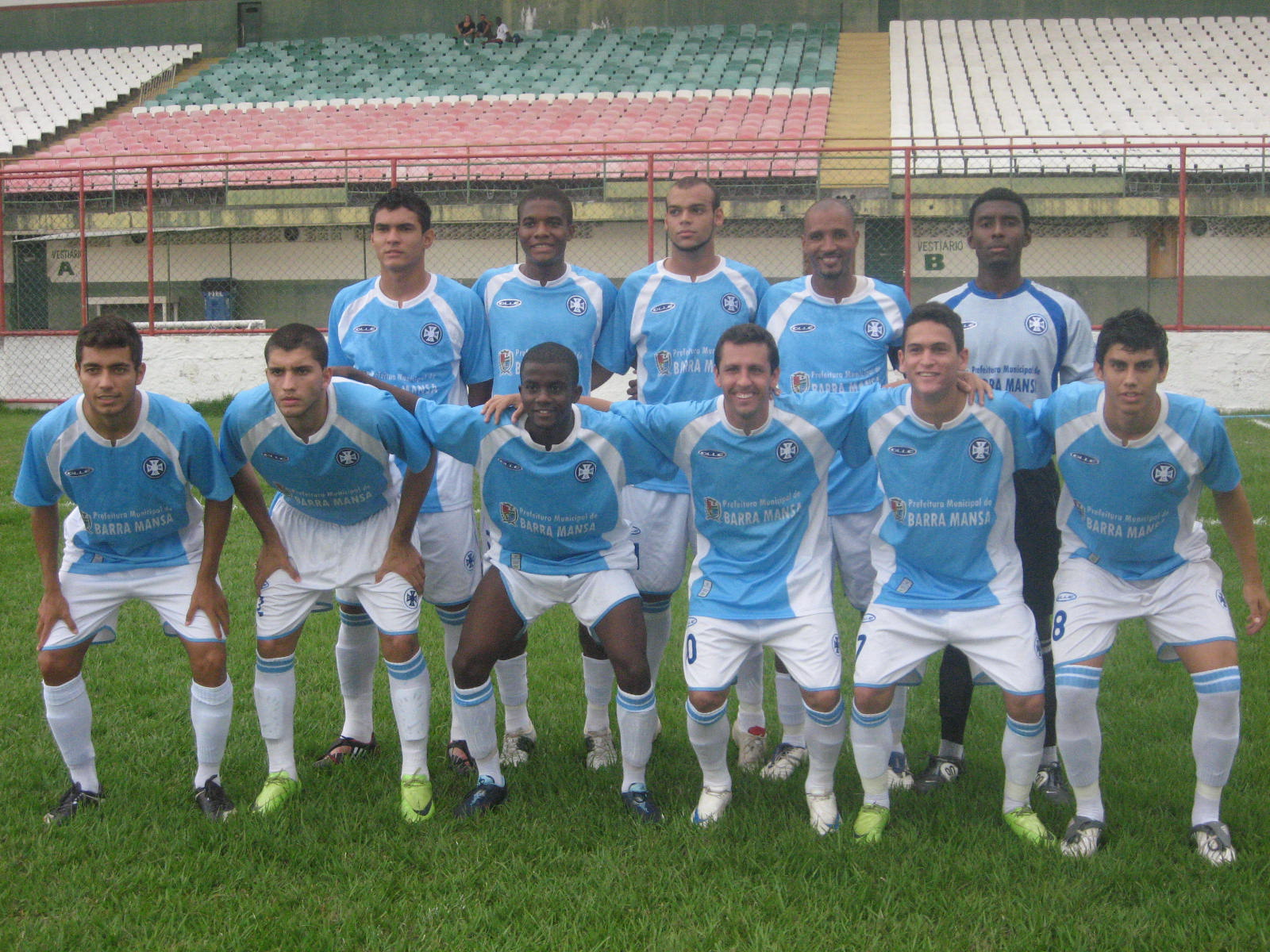
Team photo from the 2010 season

Barra Mansa Futebol Clube, commonly known as Barra Mansa, is a Brazilian football club based in Barra Mansa, Rio de Janeiro state. They competed in the Série C once.

== History ==
The club was founded on November 15, 1908. Barra Mansa won the Campeonato Fluminense in 1953, and the special edition of that competition in the same year. They won the Campeonato Carioca Second level in 1995. Barra Mansa competed in the Série C in 1996, when they were eliminated in the First Stage.

== Honours ==
=== State ===
- Campeonato Fluminense
  - Winners (2): 1953, 1953 special competition
- Campeonato Carioca Série A2
  - Winners (2): 1995, 2014
- Taça Santos Dumont
  - Winners (1): 2014

=== City ===
- Campeonato Citadino de Barra Mansa
  - Winners (11): 1940, 1941,1942, 1943, 1944, 1946,1947, 1948, 1951, 1964, 1977
- Torneio Início
  - Winners (11): 1941, 1942, 1943, 1944, 1946, 1950, 1960, 1964, 1966, 1971, 1978

== Stadium ==
Barra Mansa Futebol Clube play their home games at Estádio Leão do Sul. The stadium has a maximum capacity of 12,000 people.
