= Campo Grande Atlético Clube =

Campo Grande
- Full name: Campo Grande Atlético Clube
- Nicknames: Campusca; Galo da Zona Oeste (West Side Rooster); Alvi-Negro (The Black & White)
- Founded: June 13, 1940
- Ground: Estádio Ítalo Del Cima, Rio de Janeiro, Brazil
- Capacity: 18,000
- Chairman: Humberto Costa
- League: Campeonato Carioca Série B2
- 2024: 1º (Champions)
Home colours	Away colours

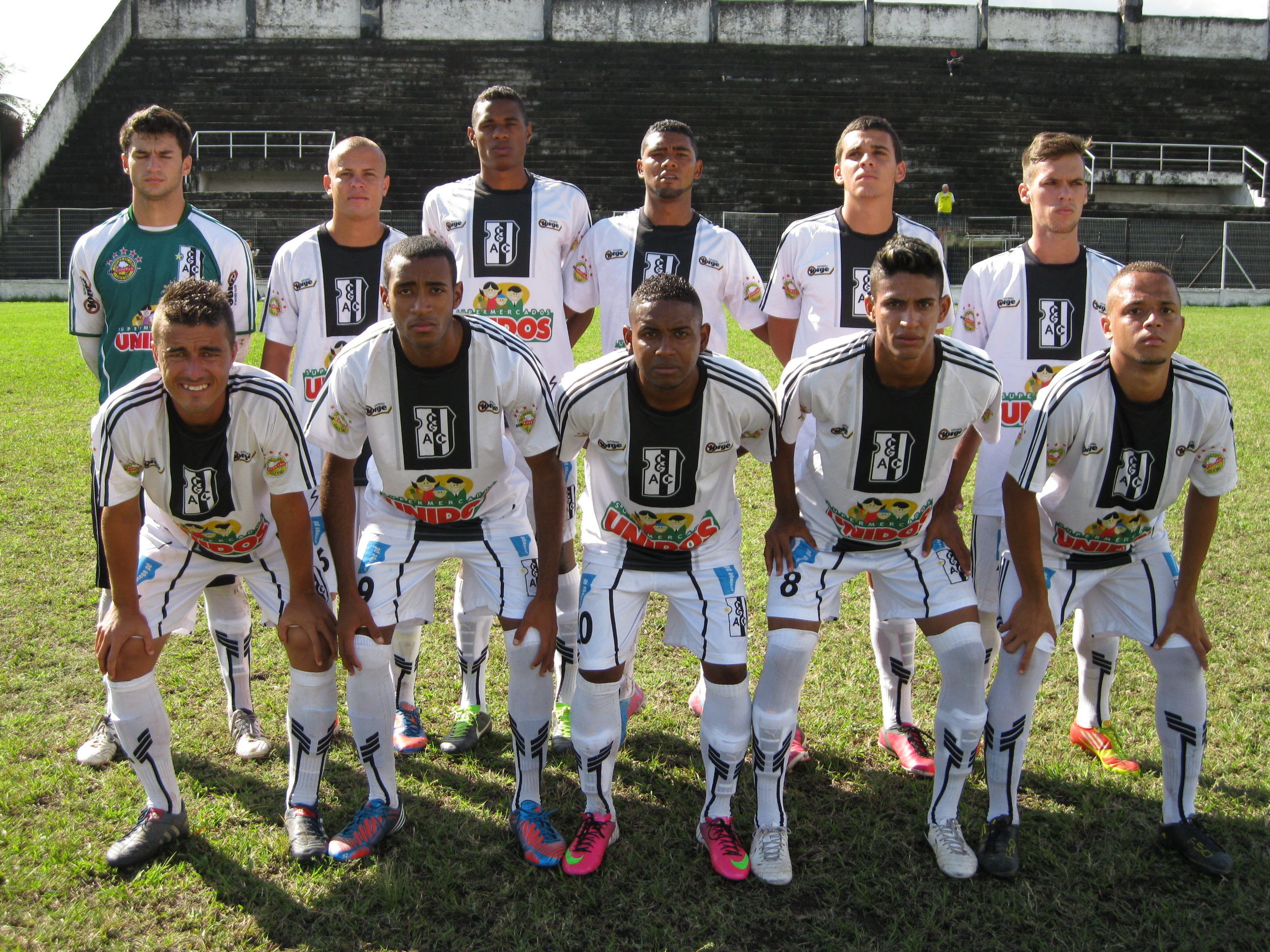
Campo Grande 2013

Campo Grande Atlético Clube, or Campo Grande as they are usually called, is a Brazilian football team from Campo Grande neighborhood, Rio de Janeiro in Rio de Janeiro, founded on June 13, 1940.

== History ==
On June 13, 1940, Campo Grande Atlético Clube was founded.

In 1979, the club played the Campeonato Brasileiro First Division for the first time. Campo Grande finished in the 27th position. The club reached the league's second stage.

In 1982, the club won its only national title so far, the Brazilian Second Division, after defeating CSA of Alagoas in the final. Campo Grande's Luisinho was the top goalscorer of the competition, with 10 goals. The club was promoted to the following year's first division.

In 1983, the club played the Campeonato Brasileiro First Division for the second time. The club was eliminated in the first stage, playing then a second stage qualification playoff against Paysandu. After defeating Paysandu, the club qualified to the second stage, finishing in the group's last position. Campo Grande finished in the competition's 24th place.

In 1991, Roberto Dinamite, Vasco da Gama's biggest idol and one of the most prolific Brazilian goal scorers ever (he has scored 698 goals in his career, most of them for Vasco), played for Campo Grande.

== Honours ==
=== Official tournaments ===
National
Competitions	Titles	Seasons
Campeonato Brasileiro Série B	1	1982
State
Competitions	Titles	Seasons
Campeonato Carioca Série A2	1	1985
Campeonato Carioca Série B2	1^{s}	2024

- record
- ^{s} shared record

=== Others tournaments ===
==== State ====
- Taça Maracanã (1): 2024

=== Runners-up ===
- Campeonato Carioca Série A2 (2): 1989, 1998
- Campeonato Carioca Série B1 (1): 2008
- Campeonato Carioca Série B2 (1): 2019

=== Women's Football ===
- Campeonato Carioca de Futebol Feminino (2): 2004, 2008

== Stadium ==
Campo Grande's stadium is Estádio Ítalo Del Cima, built in 1960, with a maximum capacity of 18,000 people.

== Team colors ==
Campo Grande's colors are black and white. They usually play in black and white vertical stripes, black shorts and white socks. Its away kit is almost all-white, with the exception being its black socks.

== Mascot ==
The club's mascot is a rooster wearing Campo Grande's home kit and black football boots.

== Notable players ==
- (Brazil) Cláudio Adão
- (Brazil) Dadá Maravilha
- (Brazil) Décio Esteves (1962)
- (Brazil) Roberto Dinamite
- (Brazil) Pingo

== Notable managers ==
Vanderlei Luxemburgo started his career as a manager in 1983, coaching Campo Grande.
