= Mesquita Futebol Clube =

Brazilian football club

Mesquita
- Full name: Mesquita Futebol Clube
- Nickname(s): Tubarão da Baixada
- Founded: 9 May 1920
- Ground: Nielsen Lousada
- Capacity: 4,000
| Home colours | Away colours |

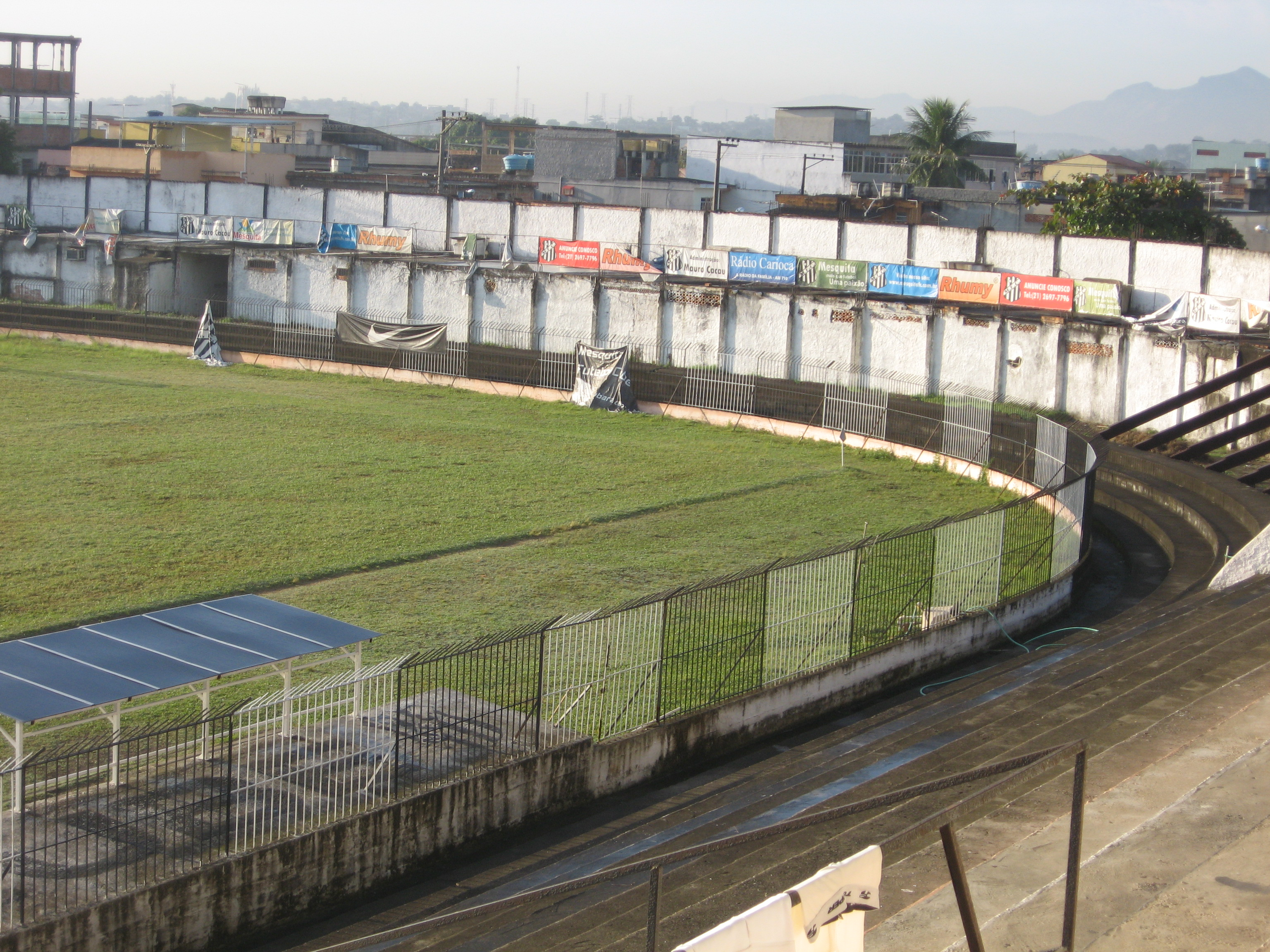
Estádio Niélsen Louzada

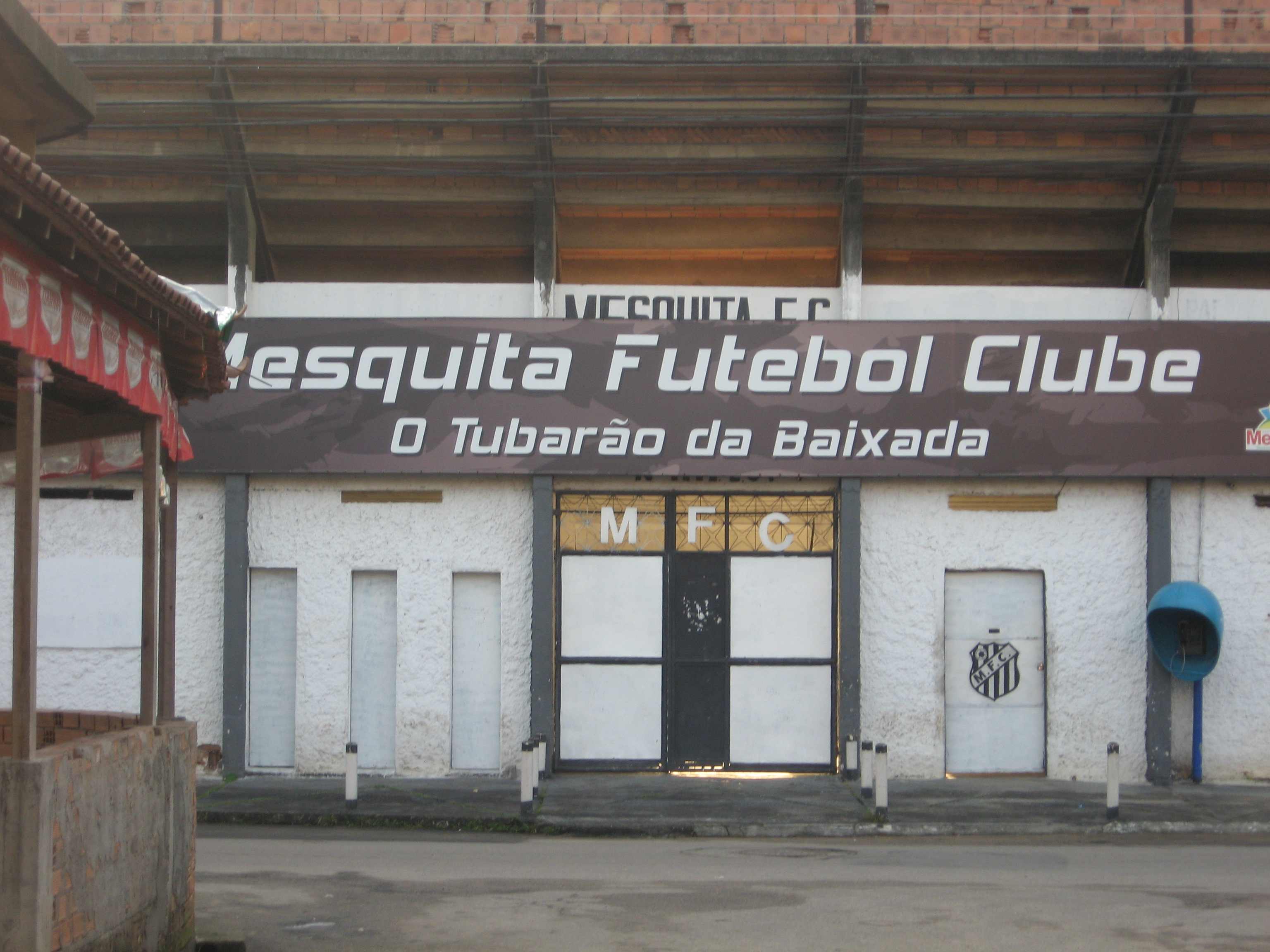
Estádio Niélsen Louzada - entrance

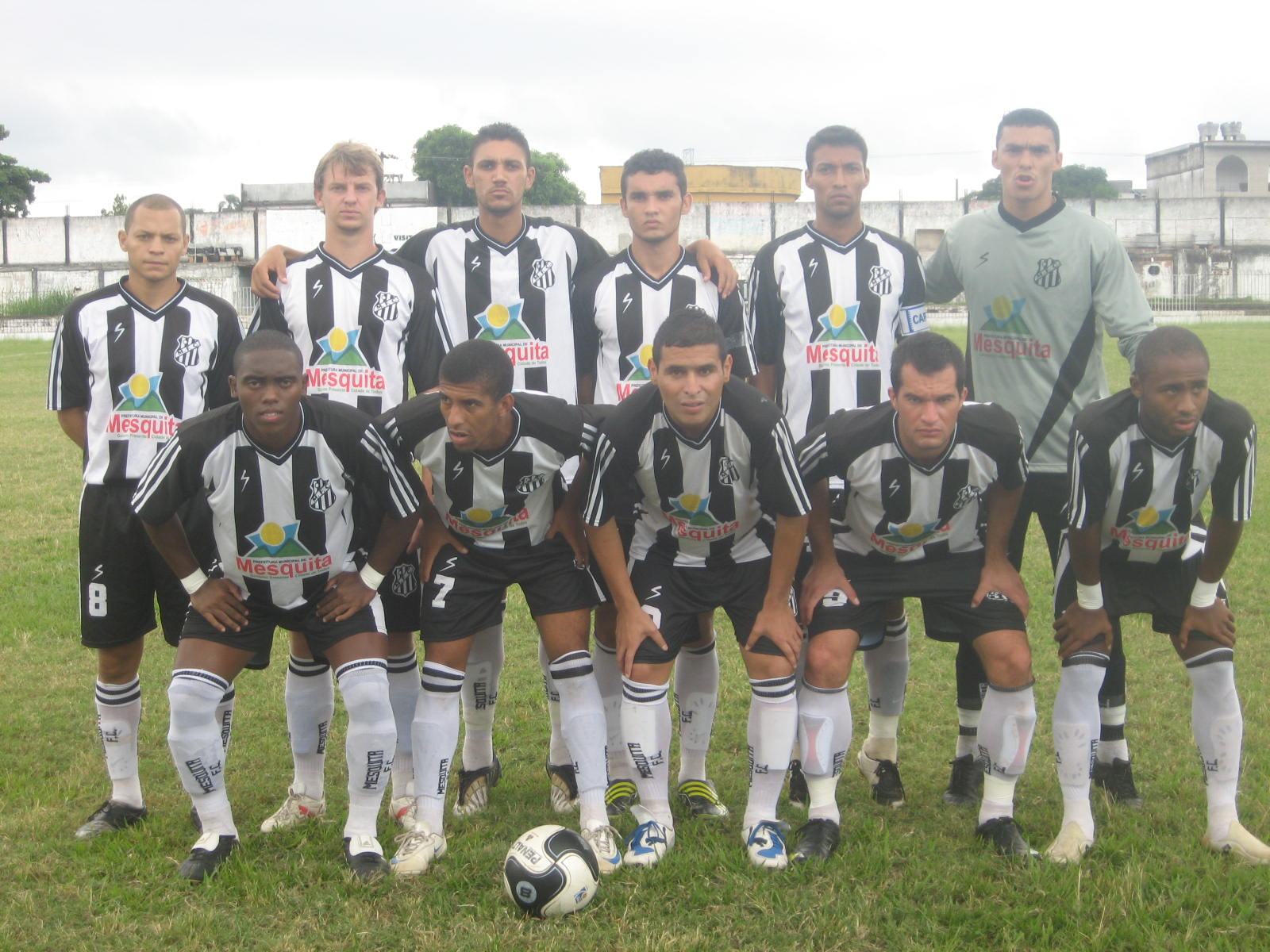
Team photo from the 2010 season

Mesquita Futebol Clube, usually known simply as Mesquita, is a Brazilian football team from the city of Mesquita, Rio de Janeiro state, founded on May 9, 1920.

== Honours ==
- Campeonato Carioca Série B1
  - Winners (1): 1981

== Stadium ==
The home stadium Nielsen Lousada, nicknamed Lousadão, has a capacity of 4,000 people.

== Colors ==
The official colors are black and white.
