= Esporte Clube Nova Cidade =

Nova Cidade
- Full name: Esporte Clube Nova Cidade
- Nickname: Gigante da Baixada
- Founded: October 10, 1939
- Ground: Estádio Joaquim de Almeida Flores, Nilópolis, Rio de Janeiro state, Brazil
- Capacity: 3,000
- President: Jorge Eloy
- Head Coach: Jailton Caravela
Home colours	Away colours

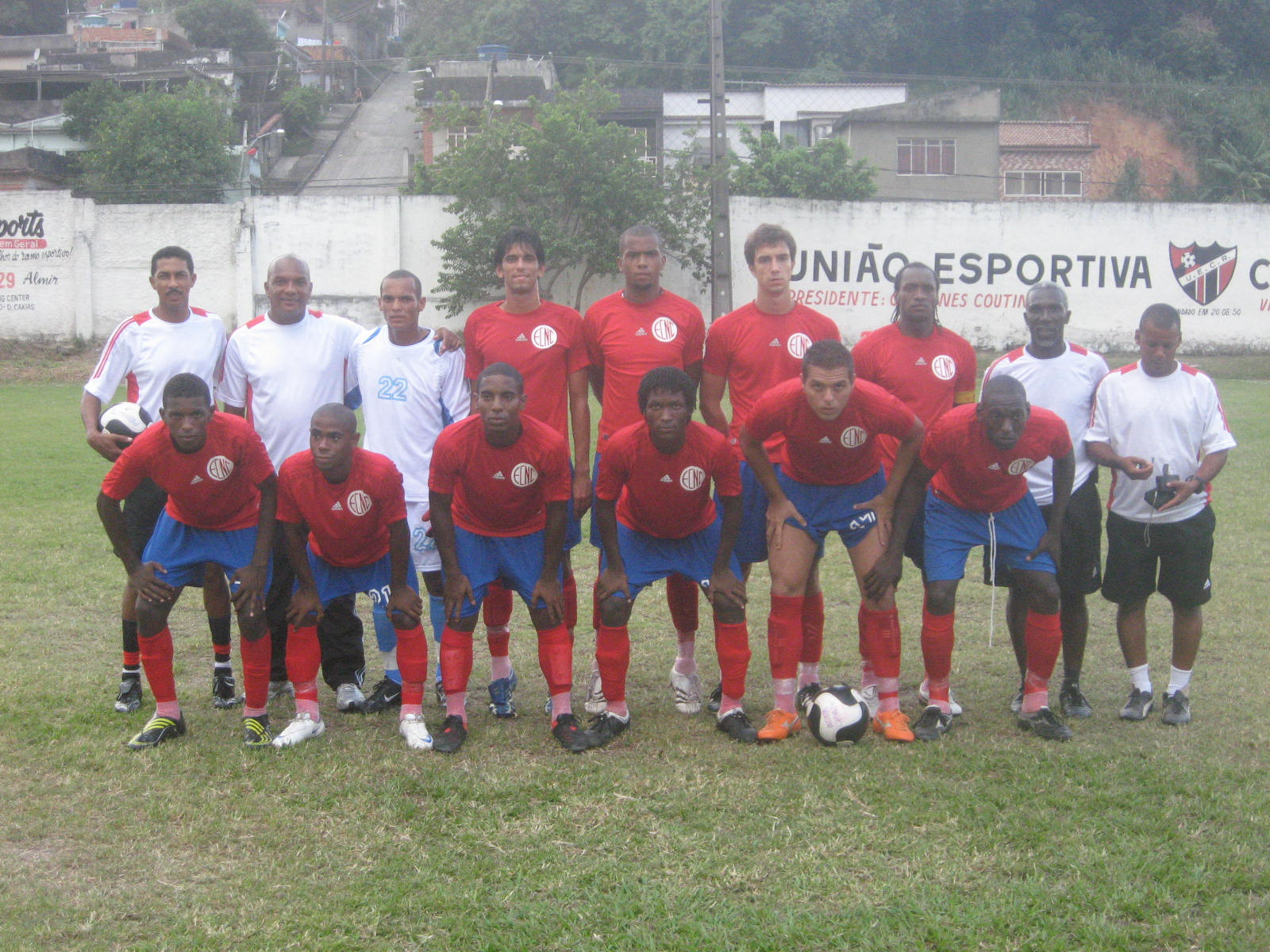
Team photo from the 2010 season

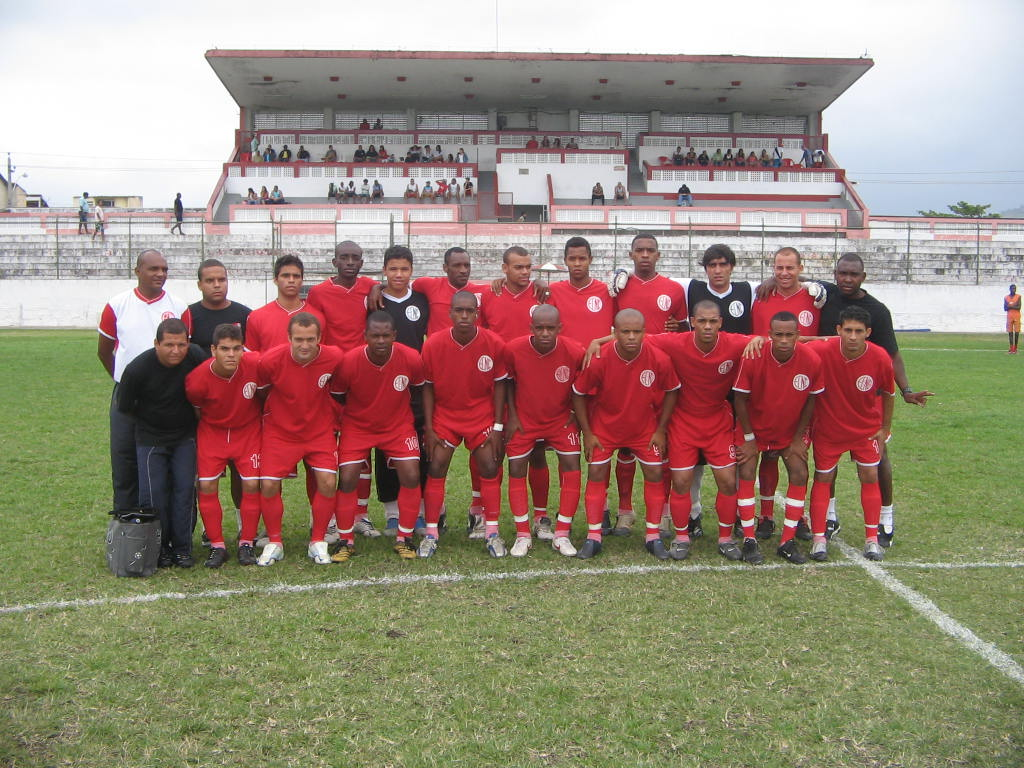
Team photo from the 2007 season

Esporte Clube Nova Cidade, commonly known as Nova Cidade, is a Brazilian football club based in Nilópolis, Rio de Janeiro state.

== History ==
The club was founded on November 10, 1939. Nova Cidade won the Campeonato Carioca Second Level in 1988.

Esporte Clube New Town is a sports college of the city of Nilópolis in the state of Rio de Janeiro, founded on September 10, 1939 .

Was created by athletes Joaquim de Almeida Flores and his sons Almeida Flores de Freitas, Paulo de Almeida Flowers and Mauro de Almeida Flores, in addition to friends Sebastião Luiz Trindade, Luis Maria de Aguilar, Wilson Castro Straw, John Castro of straw, Lourival Straw Castro, Hugo Mauricio Barbosa, Ernesto Cardoso, Fernando Rodegheri, Donizetti de Oliveira, Baldwin Francisco Cesar, Waldemar Arcas, John the Baptist Pinto, Pedro Geraldo da Silva, Genésio de Souza Barros and Jacinto Gomes Coelho.

Was officially founded with the participation of Castro straw family, the club had its first headquarters, temporary, installed at the Souza Barros Genésio office. In the same year, the cost of CR $60,000.00 were purchased from Lincoln Rodrigues, 24 lots of land for the construction stage and has elected its first board : president, Oscar Fonseca Monteiro Júnior; First Secretary : Waldemar Areas; Second Secretary : Edelfrido Antonio da Silva; Treasurer : John Straw Castro and the sport director, Daniel da Costa Trinity.

Their stadium was inaugurated in 1941, the year it gets the fourth place in the Iguaçuana League sports championship. In 1943, he is the vice-championship tournament.

During these early years the improvements of the stadium despite timid were constant. In 1949, playing the first League championship Nilopolitana Sports, if sagra champion.

In the first two decades, began participating in large state football competitions, winning important victories. In this period it was built the stadium Joaquim de Almeida Flores, surrounded by a wall about five meters high, with changing rooms, administration area and lighting towers. In the late 70s the club went into decline, as many members stopped paying tuition, the football schools were being phased out and social events are over.

Only in the 80s it is that the New Town returned to the football scene with the great Dr. Jacob Sessim the collaboration that made a total renovation of the stadium and sports Julio Lourenço and Paulo Sergio Fernandes who officiated the professionalization of the club in the Brazilian Confederation of Football in May 1983, the year in which the club participated for the first time Championship of the 3rd Professional Division FFERJ, ranking last in his key, the "B" and not classifying the finals, behind National Foot -Ball Club, Tupy Sport Club, Union Sports Coelho da Rocha, Esporte Clube Miguel Couto, Tomazinho Football Club and Athletic Club Heliopolis. The National and Cabofriense Athletic Association were promoted to the 2nd Division.

In 1984, the New Town graduated from professional and amateur character of disputes.

In 1985, won the State Championship Junior of the 3rd Division. In the professional category did not reach the finals to become only fourth in his key behind Tomazinho Futebol Clube, Central Sport Club and Athletic Club Heliopolis. And ahead of Flywheels Athletic Association and Union Sports Coelho da Rocha. They were promoted Alegre and Central Porto.

In 1986, he begins to climb the Nilópolis club towards the state elite. After a bad start of the first phase took fourth and last in his key behind Flywheels Athletic Association, Tomazinho Football Club and Union Sports Coelho da Rocha, the New City qualified for the finals and was ranked in second place, behind only the Tomazinho Futebol Clube, and ahead of Athletic Association Flywheels, Union Sports Coelho da Rocha, Olympico Football Club, Sports Association XV November, Tamoio Football Club and Cruzeiro Futebol Clube. The New Town thus was crowned runner-up of the 3rd Division and obtained access to the 2nd Division.

In 1988, after two rounds played in the 2nd Division, was second, behind Campo Grande Athletic Club, and ahead of Olaria Atlético Clube, Central Sport Club, Paduano Esporte Clube, Serrano Football Club, Mosque Futebol Clube, Crimson Athletic Club, Portuguese Athletic Association, Sports Club Miguel Couto, Bonsucesso Futebol Clube, Madureira Esporte Clube and Tomazinho Futebol Clube. The decision of the second round, beat the Campo Grande by 4-1 and qualified for the finals in front of Campo Grande, Pottery and St. Kitts. At the end of the square, took first, succeeded by Campo Grande Athletic Club, Olaria Atlético Clube and São Cristóvão de Futebol e Regatas, earning an unprecedented manner the 2nd Division Championship and reaching access to the 1st Division, which remained in years 1989 and 1990 and this year relegated to the 2nd Division. In the years 1991 and 1992 participated in the 2nd Division Championship.

In 1992, Serginho played for the club. According to the cited source, he later continued his career with Itaperuna Esporte Clube Bahia, CR Flamengo, Cruzeiro Esporte Clube, São Paulo Futebol Clube, and AC Milan.

In 2010, the club returned to the professionalism and participated in the Third Professional Division of the State of Rio de Janeiro, not reaching the second stage of the contest.

In 2015, the New Town confirms presence in the Carioca Championship Serie C, which will consist of 15 teams. Winning unbeaten way the city of Nova Iguaçu Cup U20 category, beating Boavista Sport Club in the final.

== Honours ==
=== State ===
- Campeonato Carioca Série A2
  - Winners (1): 1988
- Campeonato Carioca Série B1
  - Winners (1): 2018

=== Others ===
- Campeão Estadual da Terceira Divisão de Juniores: 1985;
- Vice-campeão Estadual da Terceira Divisão: 1986;
- Campeão do Torneio Início da Baixada Fluminense: 1956;
- Vice-campeão da Liga de Desportos de Nova Iguaçu: 1943;
- Campeão da Liga Nilopolitana de Desportos: 1949;
- Campeão invicto da Taça Cidade de Nova Iguaçu (sub 20): 2015;

== Stadium ==
Esporte Clube Nova Cidade play their home games at Estádio Joaquim de Almeida Flores. The stadium has a maximum capacity of 3,000 people.
