= América Futebol Clube (Três Rios) =

América
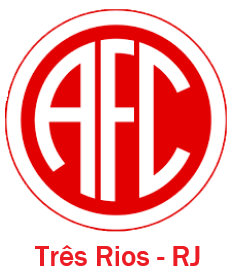
- Full name: América Futebol Clube
- Nickname(s): Alvirrubro Trirriense; Mecão; Diabo
- Founded: May 14, 1929; 96 years ago
- Ground: Tievão
- Capacity: 5,000
Home colours	Away colours

América Futebol Clube, usually known simply as América, or as América de Três Rios, América-TR or América (TR), is a Brazilian football club from Três Rios, Rio de Janeiro state.

== History ==
On May 14, 1929, América Futebol Clube was founded. The club was named after America Football Club (RJ).

In 1989, América de Três Rios won the Campeonato Carioca Segunda Divisão, and thus was promoted to the following year's first level.

In 1990, the club disputed the Campeonato Carioca for the first time. The club finished in the 8th position.

In 1991, América de Três Rios disputed again the Rio de Janeiro state championship. In Taça Guanabara, the club finished in the 10th position, and in Taça Rio, the club finished in the 7th position.

In 1992, the club disputed again the Campeonato Carioca. It was the club's all-time best campaign, finishing in the 4th position, ahead of Botafogo, and only behind the other three Rio de Janeiro big teams, Vasco da Gama, Flamengo and Fluminense.

In 1993, América de Três Rios disputed the state championship for the last time. The club was relegated to the second level after finishing in the last position in the competition. In Taça Guanabara, the club lost 10 points due to the utilization of an ineligible player named Juarez, finishing the competition with -7 points.

As of 2007, the club's football section is closed

The club reopened its football department to compete in the 2011 Campeonato Carioca Third Level

== Honours ==
- Campeonato Carioca Série A2
  - Winners (1): 1989
- Campeonato Carioca Série B1
  - Winners (1): 1988

== Stadium ==
América de Três Rios 's home stadium is Estádio Arthur Sebastião de Toledo Ribas, nicknamed Tievão, with a maximum capacity of 5,000 people.

== Adílio ==
In 1994, Adílio, better known as the 1981 Intercontinental Cup champion defending Flamengo, played for the club.

== Club colors ==
The club colors are red and white. The home kit is composed of red shirts, white shorts and white socks, and the away kit is composed of white shirts, red shorts and red socks.

== Other sports ==
América de Três Rios basketball team is still active, disputing mostly state championships.
