= Itaperuna Esporte Clube =

Itaperuna
- Full name: Itaperuna Esporte Clube
- Nickname: Águia do Noroeste
- Founded: 21 July 1989
- Ground: Estádio Jair Bittencourt, Itaperuna, Brazil
- Capacity: 10,000
- Chairman: Roberto Ahmed Sued
- Manager: João Carlos Santos Amaral
- League: -
- 2006: -
Home colours	Away colours

Itaperuna Esporte Clube, or Itaperuna as they are usually called, is a Brazilian football team from Itaperuna in Rio de Janeiro, founded on July 21, 1989.

Home stadium is the Jair Bittencourt stadium, capacity 10,000.

== History ==
The first football was brought to Itaperuna city in 1911, and, soon after, the first football matches were played at Fazenda Porto Alegre (Porto Alegre Farm, in English, near Avenida Zulamith Bittencourt (Zulamith Bittencourt Avenue, in English).

In 1915, Porto Alegre Futebol Clube were founded, adopting black, white and red as its official colors. In 1943, Comércio e Indústria football club were founded, and, in 1948, Unidos Atlético Clube were founded.

In 1985, Porto Alegre won Campeonato Carioca Third Level, gaining the right to play in the second level in the following year.

On July 21, 1989, Itaperuna Esporte Clube was founded, after three Itaperuna city teams, Porto Alegre Futebol Clube, Comércio e Indústria and Unidos Atlético Clube, and its respective estates, fused. The new club adopted Porto Alegre's colors, as the club is a successor of the former club.

In 1989, Itaperuna won its most important title, which was the Campeonato Carioca Selective Tournament.

In 2005, Itaperuna disputed Campeonato Carioca Second Level, and finished the competition in 10th in their group, being eliminated in the first round.

The club disputed Campeonato Carioca First Division in 1987 and 1988 as Porto Alegre, and from 1989 to 2001 as Itaperuna.

Itaperuna disputed Brazilian National Second Division four times, in 1989, 1990, 1991, and 1992. And disputed the third division two times, in 1988 (as Porto Alegre), and 1995.

== Honours ==
- Campeonato Carioca Série B1
  - Winners (1): 1985
