= 2017 Campeonato Carioca Série B1 =

Campeonato Carioca Série B1
- Season: 2017
- Dates: 27 May – 23 September 2017
- Champions: Goytacaz
- Promoted: America; Goytacaz
- Relegated: Barra Mansa; São Cristóvão; Queimados

The 2017 Campeonato Carioca Série B1 was the 38th edition of the main football division in Rio de Janeiro. The contest is organized by FERJ. from 2017, in Campeonato Carioca Série B called Série B1. The main novelty for a season will be an inclusion of the two times demoted in the 2017 Campeonato Carioca.

The Carapebus was downgraded as Campos, however after the dispute in 2017 Campeonato Carioca the partnership between the two teams ended and the Campos joined FERJ, contending in Serie C 2017.

== Participating teams ==
Club	Home city
America	Rio de Janeiro
Americano	Campos dos Goytacazes
Artsul	Nova Iguaçu
Audax Rio	São João de Meriti
Barcelona	Rio de Janeiro
Barra da Tijuca	Rio de Janeiro
Barra Mansa	Barra Mansa
Carapebus	Carapebus
Duque de Caxias	Duque de Caxias
Friburguense	Nova Friburgo
Gonçalense	São Gonçalo
Goytacaz	Campos dos Goytacazes
Itaboraí	Itaboraí
Olaria	Rio de Janeiro
Queimados	Queimados
Sampaio Corrêa	Saquarema
São Cristóvão	Rio de Janeiro
São Gonçalo	São Gonçalo
Serra Macaense	Macaé
Serrano	Petrópolis
Tigres do Brasil	Duque de Caxias

== Championship round ==
=== Taça Santos Dumont ===
Group A

Pos	Team	Pld	W	D	L	GF	GA	GD	Pts	Qualification
1	Audax Rio (Q)	10	7	3	0	26	9	+17	24	Advanced in Semifinals
2	Americano (Q)	10	7	3	0	16	7	+9	24	Advanced in Semifinals
3	Barcelona	10	6	0	4	11	11	0	18	
4	Sampaio Corrêa	10	5	3	2	10	7	+3	18	
5	America	10	5	2	3	11	7	+4	17	
6	Olaria	10	3	4	3	16	14	+2	13	
7	Itaboraí	10	3	3	4	9	10	−1	12	
8	Serra Macaense	10	3	2	5	13	15	−2	11	
9	Carapebus	10	2	2	6	7	14	−7	8	
10	Barra Mansa	10	1	3	6	8	14	−6	6	
11	Queimados	10	0	1	9	6	25	−19	1	

Rules for classification: 1) points; 2) goal difference; 3) number of goals scored.
(Q) Qualified for the phase indicated

Group B

Pos	Team	Pld	W	D	L	GF	GA	GD	Pts	Qualification
1	Goytacaz (Q)	9	6	3	0	16	3	+13	21	Advanced in Semifinals
2	Duque de Caxias (Q)	9	5	3	1	22	11	+11	18	Advanced in Semifinals
3	Barra da Tijuca	9	5	2	2	12	10	+2	17	
4	Friburguense	9	5	2	2	13	9	+4	17	
5	São Gonçalo	9	4	5	0	18	6	+12	17	
6	Tigres do Brasil	9	3	3	3	15	10	+5	12	
7	Gonçalense	9	2	2	5	10	18	−8	8	
8	Artsul	9	2	2	5	13	22	−9	8	
9	Serrano	9	1	1	7	4	18	−14	4	
10	São Cristóvão	9	0	1	8	9	25	−16	1	

Rules for classification: 1) points; 2) goal difference; 3) number of goals scored.
(Q) Qualified for the phase indicated

Knockout stage

Semifinals
1	Audax Rio	2
4	Duque de Caxias	0
3	Goytacaz	2
2	Americano	1

Final
Audax Rio	0 (4)
Goytacaz	0 (5)

==== Final ====
8 July 2017
16:00

Audax Rio	0 - 0	Goytacaz
Penalties
Yuri (penalty scored); Leandro Chaves (penalty scored); Emerson Carioca (penalty scored); Mayron (penalty scored); Denilson (penalty missed)	4 - 5	(penalty scored) Almir; (penalty scored) Rodriguinho; (penalty scored) Igor; (penalty scored) Oliveira; (penalty scored) Galhardo

Moça Bonita, Rio de Janeiro

Taça Santos Dumont
2017 champion
Goytacaz
1st title

=== Taça Corcovado ===
Group A

Pos	Team	Pld	W	D	L	GF	GA	GD	Pts	Qualification
1	Itaboraí (Q)	10	6	3	1	14	10	+4	21	Advanced in Semifinals
2	America (Q)	10	6	2	2	21	8	+13	20	Advanced in Semifinals
3	Audax Rio	10	6	2	2	19	9	+10	20	
4	Americano	10	5	3	2	11	8	+3	18	
5	Serra Macaense	10	4	4	2	16	14	+2	16	
6	Olaria	10	3	5	2	14	12	+2	14	
7	Sampaio Corrêa	10	2	3	5	9	13	−4	9	
8	Carapebus	10	1	6	3	12	15	−3	9	
9	Barra Mansa	10	1	2	7	10	18	−8	5	
10	Barcelona	10	1	1	8	5	16	−11	4	
11	Queimados	10	1	1	8	7	23	−16	4	

Rules for classification: 1) points; 2) goal difference; 3) number of goals scored.
(Q) Qualified for the phase indicated

Group B

Pos	Team	Pld	W	D	L	GF	GA	GD	Pts	Qualification
1	Artsul (Q)	11	6	2	3	20	19	+1	20	Advanced in Semifinals
2	Goytacaz (Q)	11	5	3	3	13	6	+7	18	Advanced in Semifinals
3	Tigres do Brasil	11	5	3	3	9	10	−1	18	
4	Duque de Caxias	11	4	6	1	24	17	+7	18	
5	Serrano	11	4	5	2	7	8	−1	17	
6	Gonçalense	11	5	1	5	13	14	−1	16	
7	São Gonçalo	11	4	3	4	21	14	+7	15	
8	Friburguense	11	4	3	4	15	14	+1	15	
9	Barra da Tijuca	11	3	5	3	13	15	−2	14	
10	São Cristóvão	11	2	1	8	11	23	−12	7	

Rules for classification: 1) points; 2) goal difference; 3) number of goals scored.
(Q) Qualified for the phase indicated

Knockout stage

Semifinals
1	Itaboraí	2
4	Goytacaz	1
3	Artsul	0
2	America	2

Final
Itaboraí	2 (7)
America	2 (8)

==== Final ====
9 September 2017
15:00

Itaboraí	2 – 2	America
Edu 45+2' (pen.); Bruno Santos 72'		45+4' Léo Rocha; 90+2' (pen.) Allan Barreto
Penalties
Léo Franco (penalty scored); Bruno Neves (penalty scored); Edu (penalty scored); Crispim (penalty scored); Peterson (penalty scored); William Chrispim (penalty scored); Rodrigão (penalty scored); Raphael Neuhaus (penalty missed)	7 – 8	(penalty scored) Pessanha; (penalty scored) Léo Rocha; (penalty scored) Robinho; (penalty scored) Philip; (penalty scored) Allan Barreto; (penalty scored) Welber; (penalty scored) Ânderson Künzel; (penalty scored) Alan Nascimento

Eucy de Resende Mendonça, Saquarema

Taça Corcovado
2017 champion
America
1st title

== Overall table ==
Pos	Team	Pld	W	D	L	GF	GA	GD	Pts	Qualification or relegation
1	Audax Rio (Q)	20	13	5	2	45	18	+27	44	Advanced in Final stage
2	Americano (Q)	20	12	6	2	27	15	+12	42	Advanced in Final stage
3	Goytacaz (Q)	20	11	6	3	39	9	+30	39	Advanced in Final stage
4	América (Q)	20	11	4	5	32	15	+17	37	Advanced in Final stage
5	Duque de Caxias	20	9	9	2	46	28	+18	36	
6	Itaboraí	20	9	6	5	25	20	+5	33	
7	Friburguense	20	9	5	6	28	23	+5	32	
8	São Gonçalo EC	20	8	8	4	39	20	+19	32	
9	Barra da Tijuca	20	8	7	5	25	25	0	31	
10	Tigres do Brasil	20	8	6	6	24	20	+4	30	
11	Artsul	20	8	4	8	35	41	−6	28	
12	Serra Macaense	20	7	6	7	29	29	0	27	
13	Sampaio Corrêa	20	7	6	7	19	20	−1	27	
14	Olaria	20	6	9	5	30	26	+4	27	
15	Gonçalense	20	7	3	10	23	32	−9	24	
16	Barcelona	20	7	1	12	16	27	−11	22	
17	Serrano	20	5	6	9	11	26	−15	21	
18	Carapebus	20	3	8	9	19	29	−10	17	
19	Barra Mansa (R)	20	2	5	13	18	32	−14	11	2018 Campeonato Carioca Série B2
20	São Cristóvão (R)	20	2	2	16	20	48	−28	8	2018 Campeonato Carioca Série B2
21	Queimados (R)	20	1	2	17	13	48	−35	5	2018 Campeonato Carioca Série B2

Rules for classification: 1) points; 2) goal difference; 3) number of goals scored.
(Q) Qualified for the phase indicated; (R) Relegated

=== Final stage ===
Semifinals
1	Audax Rio	0
4	America	2
3	Goytacaz	1
2	Americano	0

Final
America	0	1	1
Goytacaz	1	1	2

=== Semi-finals ===
16 September 2017
15:00

Americano	0 - 1	Goytacaz
		89' Luquinha

Eduardo Guinle, Nova Friburgo
Attendance: 1118
Referee: Wagner do Nascimento Magalhães

16 September 2017
15:00

Audax Rio	0 – 2	America
		11' Anderson Künzel; 74' Allan Barreto

Moça Bonita, Rio de Janeiro
Attendance: 1500
Referee: Rodrigo Nunes de Sá

=== Final ===
26 September 2017
20:30

America	0 - 1	Goytacaz
		37' Luan

Giulite Coutinho, Mesquita
Referee: Carlos Eduardo Nunes Braga

30 September 2017
15:00

Goytacaz	1 - 1	America
Gabriel Galhardo 60'		18' Anderson Künzel

Aryzão, Campos dos Goytacazes
Referee: Marcelo de Lima Henrique

Campeonato Carioca Série B1
2017 champion
Goytacaz
2nd title
