= 2015 Campeonato Carioca Série B =

Campeonato Carioca Série B
- Season: 2015
- Dates: March 15 – July 25, 2015
- Champions: America
- Promoted: America; Portuguesa
- Relegated: São João da Barra; Barcelona; Grêmio Mangaratibense

The 2015 Campeonato Carioca de Futebol Série B was the 38th edition of the main division of football in Rio de Janeiro. The contest is organized by Federação de Futebol do Estado do Rio de Janeiro (FERJ). The competition consisted of two stages: Taça Santos Dumont and Taça Corcovado. In the first, the times of a group face each other in turn single. In the second, they face within the key. The champions of each shift, plus the best raters in general, which have not yet been champions, are in the Triangular Final to decide the champion.

In this edition, there will be access to three times for the Serie A in 2016. Being the champion entering the main phase and the other participating in a selective, that will be disputed even by the end of this year. The measure was approved in the Council of Arbitration on 30 January. The formula of dispute this Selective will be determined in subsequent meetings.

== Participating teams ==
Club	Home city
America	Rio de Janeiro
Americano	Campos dos Goytacazes
Angra dos Reis	Angra dos Reis
Audax Rio	São João de Meriti
Barcelona	Rio de Janeiro
Barra da Tijuca	Rio de Janeiro
Céres	Rio de Janeiro
Duque de Caxias	Duque de Caxias
Gonçalense	São Gonçalo
Goytacaz	Campos dos Goytacazes
Mangaratibense	Mangaratiba
Olaria	Rio de Janeiro
Portuguesa	Rio de Janeiro
Queimados	Queimados
Sampaio Corrêa	Saquarema
São Cristóvão	Rio de Janeiro
São Gonçalo	São Gonçalo
São João da Barra	São João da Barra

== Taça Santos Dumont ==
=== Group A ===
Pos	Team	Pts	Pld	W	D	L	GF	GA	GD	Qualification
1	Portuguesa	20	9	6	2	1	19	8	+11	Advanced to the Semifinals
2	Americano	18	9	5	3	1	15	8	+7	Advanced to the Semifinals
3	Céres	17	9	5	2	2	11	9	+2	
4	Gonçalense	15	9	4	3	2	10	5	+5	
5	Audax Rio	14	9	4	2	3	14	10	+4	
6	Goytacaz	14	9	3	5	1	10	5	+5	
7	Sampaio Corrêa	14	9	3	5	1	14	12	+2	
8	São Cristóvão	13	9	4	1	4	14	12	+2	
9	São João da Barra	8	9	2	2	5	10	13	-3	

=== Group B ===
Pos	Team	Pts	Pld	W	D	L	GF	GA	GD	Qualification
1	America	16	9	4	4	1	11	4	+7	Advanced to the Semifinals
2	Angra dos Reis	14	9	4	2	3	7	7	+0	Advanced to the Semifinals
3	Olaria	11	9	3	2	4	7	12	-5	
4	Barra da Tijuca	10	9	2	4	3	11	11	+0	
5	Queimados	10	9	2	4	3	12	16	-4	
6	São Gonçalo	9	9	2	3	4	11	14	-3	
7	Duque de Caxias	9	9	2	3	4	9	13	-4	
8	Barcelona	5	9	1	2	6	5	15	-10	
9	Mangaratibense	1	9	0	1	8	9	25	-16	

=== Knockout stage ===
Semi-finals
Portuguesa	2	2	4
Angra dos Reis	2	0	2
America	0	2	2
Americano	0	3	3

Finals
Portuguesa	3	5	8
Americano	4	1	5

Taça Santos Dumont
2015 Champion
Portuguesa
1st title

== Taça Corcovado ==
=== Group A ===
Pos	Team	Pts	Pld	W	D	L	GF	GA	GD	Qualification
1	Portuguesa	20	8	6	2	0	16	7	+9	Advanced to the Semifinals
2	Americano	14	8	4	2	2	13	8	+5	Advanced to the Semifinals
3	Goytacaz	14	8	4	2	2	9	7	+2	
4	Gonçalense	13	8	3	4	1	11	8	+3	
5	Sampaio Corrêa	12	8	3	3	2	9	7	+2	
6	Céres	7	8	1	4	3	6	11	-5	
7	São Cristóvão	6	8	2	0	6	8	15	-7	
8	São João da Barra	6	8	1	3	4	4	7	-3	
9	Audax Rio	5	8	1	2	5	6	12	-6	

=== Group B ===
Pos	Team	Pts	Pld	W	D	L	GF	GA	GD	Qualification
1	Duque de Caxias	20	8	6	2	0	15	5	+10	Advanced to the Semifinals
2	America	17	8	5	2	1	14	4	+10	Advanced to the Semifinals
3	Olaria	15	8	5	0	3	17	9	+8	
4	Queimados	15	8	4	3	1	12	2	+10	
5	Angra dos Reis	12	8	3	3	2	12	8	+4	
6	São Gonçalo	10	8	3	1	4	10	15	-5	
7	Barra da Tijuca	8	8	2	2	4	10	12	-2	
8	Barcelona	4	8	1	1	6	6	17	-11	
9	Mangaratibense	0	8	0	0	8	0	24	-24	Withdrew

=== Knockout stage ===
Semi-finals
Portuguesa	2	1	3
America	2	0	2
Duque de Caxias	0	2	2 (3)
Americano (pen.)	2	0	2 (4)

Finals
Portuguesa	1	1	2
Americano	1	2	3

Taça Corcovado
2015 Champion
Americano
1st title

== Turn End ==
	AME	AMO	POR
América	—	2–0	2–2
Americano	0–2	—	4-1
Portuguesa	1–2	1-0	—

Home team victory Away team victory Draw

== Overall standings ==
Pos	Team	Qualification or relegation
1	America	Promotion to Série A
2	Portuguesa	Promotion to Série A
3	Americano	
4	Duque de Caxias	
5	Gonçalense	
6	Goytacaz	
7	Olaria	
8	Angra dos Reis	
9	Sampaio Corrêa	
10	Queimados	
11	São Cristóvão	
12	Audax Rio	
13	São Gonçalo	
14	Céres	
15	Barra da Tijuca	
16	São João da Barra	Relegation to Série C
17	Barcelona	Relegation to Série C
18	Mangaratibense	Relegation to Série C
