= 2018 Campeonato Carioca Série B1 =

Campeonato Carioca Série B1
- Season: 2018
- Dates: 19 May – 29 September 2018
- Champions: America
- Promoted: America; Americano
- Relegated: Barcelona; Santa Cruz; Carapebus

The 2018 Campeonato Carioca Série B1 was the 38th edition of the main division of football in Rio de Janeiro. The contest is organized by FERJ. from 2018, in Campeonato Carioca Série B will called Série B1. The main novelty for a season will be an inclusion of the two times demoted in the 2018 Campeonato Carioca.

== Participating teams ==
Club	Home city
America	Rio de Janeiro
Americano	Campos dos Goytacazes
Angra dos Reis	Angra dos Reis
Artsul	Nova Iguaçu
Audax Rio	São João de Meriti
Barcelona	Rio de Janeiro
Barra da Tijuca	Rio de Janeiro
Bonsucesso	Rio de Janeiro
Carapebus	Carapebus
Duque de Caxias	Duque de Caxias
Friburguense	Nova Friburgo
Gonçalense	São Gonçalo
Itaboraí	Itaboraí
Olaria	Rio de Janeiro
Sampaio Corrêa	Saquarema
Santa Cruz	Rio de Janeiro
São Gonçalo	São Gonçalo
Serra Macaense	Macaé
Serrano	Petrópolis
Tigres do Brasil	Duque de Caxias

== Championship round ==
=== Taça Santos Dumont ===
Group A

Pos	Team	Pld	W	D	L	GF	GA	GD	Pts	Qualification
1	Americano (Q)	9	7	1	1	21	7	+14	22	Advanced in Semifinals
2	America (Q)	9	6	2	1	17	6	+11	20	Advanced in Semifinals
3	Barra da Tijuca	9	6	2	1	11	5	+6	20	
4	Serra Macaense	9	5	2	2	16	14	+2	17	
5	Sampaio Corrêa	9	4	1	4	9	8	+1	13	
6	Barcelona	9	2	3	4	10	17	−7	9	
7	Santa Cruz	9	2	2	5	12	19	−7	8	
8	Gonçalense	9	2	1	6	10	17	−7	7	
9	Angra dos Reis	9	2	0	7	9	15	−6	6	
10	Artsul	9	1	2	6	9	16	−7	5	

Rules for classification: 1) points; 2) goal difference; 3) number of goals scored.
(Q) Qualified for the phase indicated

Group B

Pos	Team	Pld	W	D	L	GF	GA	GD	Pts	Qualification
1	Tigres do Brasil (Q)	10	5	3	2	15	9	+6	18	Advanced in Semifinals
2	Friburguense (Q)	9	5	1	3	14	9	+5	16	Advanced in Semifinals
3	São Gonçalo	9	5	1	3	10	10	0	16	
4	Duque de Caxias	9	4	3	2	10	7	+3	15	
5	Bonsucesso	9	3	5	1	11	5	+6	14	
6	Audax Rio	9	3	4	2	7	6	+1	13	
7	Itaboraí	9	4	0	5	13	13	0	12	
8	Olaria	9	2	4	3	8	11	−3	10	
9	Serrano	9	1	2	6	7	14	−7	5	
10	Carapebus	9	1	1	7	12	23	−11	4	

Rules for classification: 1) points; 2) goal difference; 3) number of goals scored.
(Q) Qualified for the phase indicated

Knockout stage

Semifinals
1	Americano	2
4	Friburguense	0
3	Tigres do Brasil	1
2	America	0

Final
Americano	2
Tigres do Brasil	1

==== Final ====
8 July 2018
16:00

Americano	2 - 1	Tigres do Brasil
Cláudio Maradona 66'; Maikon Aquino 75'		31' Daniel Marins

Ângelo de Carvalho, Campos dos Goytacazes

Taça Santos Dumont
2018 champion
Americano
1st title

=== Taça Corcovado ===
Group A

Pos	Team	Pld	W	D	L	GF	GA	GD	Pts	Qualification
1	Sampaio Corrêa (Q)	10	8	2	0	17	4	+13	26	Advanced in Semifinals
2	Americano (Q)	10	6	2	2	22	11	+11	20	Advanced in Semifinals
3	America	10	6	1	3	20	12	+8	19	
4	Serra Macaense	10	4	2	4	16	12	+4	14	
5	Artsul	10	4	3	3	11	12	−1	15	
6	Angra dos Reis	10	3	3	4	11	12	−1	12	
7	Gonçalense	10	3	3	4	8	14	−6	12	
8	Barra da Tijuca	10	2	5	3	8	10	−2	11	
9	Barcelona	10	1	1	8	11	23	−12	4	
10	Santa Cruz	10	1	1	8	5	23	−18	4	

Rules for classification: 1) points; 2) goal difference; 3) number of goals scored.
(Q) Qualified for the phase indicated

Group B

Pos	Team	Pld	W	D	L	GF	GA	GD	Pts	Qualification
1	Audax Rio (Q)	10	7	1	2	15	8	+7	22	Advanced in Semifinals
2	Bonsucesso (Q)	10	6	3	1	16	6	+10	21	Advanced in Semifinals
3	Friburguense	10	5	1	4	23	13	+10	16	
4	São Gonçalo	10	4	3	3	14	12	+2	15	
5	Tigres do Brasil	10	4	2	4	14	13	+1	14	
6	Duque de Caxias	10	4	2	4	11	10	+1	14	
7	Serrano	10	2	5	3	8	10	−2	11	
8	Itaboraí	10	3	1	6	14	16	−2	10	
9	Carapebus	10	3	1	6	9	23	−14	10	
10	Olaria	10	2	3	5	10	18	−8	9	

Rules for classification: 1) points; 2) goal difference; 3) number of goals scored.
(Q) Qualified for the phase indicated

Knockout stage

Semifinals
1	Sampaio Corrêa	0
4	Bonsucesso	0
3	Audax Rio	2
2	Americano	0

Final
Sampaio Corrêa	1 (3)
Audax Rio	1 (4)

==== Final ====
15 September 2018
15:00

Sampaio Corrêa	1 – 1	Audax Rio
Léo Guerreiro 89'		Gilcimar 37'
Penalties
Sorriso (penalty missed); Anderson Manga (penalty scored); Gama (penalty scored); Leomir (penalty scored); Léo Guerreiro (penalty missed)	3 – 4	(penalty scored) Rodrigo Yuri; (penalty scored) Léo Pimenta; (penalty scored) Wesley Bolinha; (penalty scored) Felipe Augusto

Eucy de Resende Mendonça, Saquarema

Taça Corcovado
2018 champion
Audax Rio
1st title

== Overall table ==
Pos	Team	Qualification or relegation
1	Americano	Advanced in Semifinals
2	America	Advanced in Semifinals
3	Sampaio Corrêa	Advanced in Semifinals
4	Audax Rio	Advanced in Semifinals
5	Bonsucesso	
6	Friburguense	
7	Serra Macaense	
8	Tigres do Brasil	
9	São Gonçalo	
10	Barra da Tijuca	
11	Duque de Caxias	
12	Itaboraí	
13	Gonçalense	
14	Artsul	
15	Angra dos Reis	
16	Serrano	
17	Olaria	
18	Barcelona	Relegation to Série C
19	Santa Cruz	Relegation to Série C
20	Carapebus	Relegation to Série C

=== Final stage ===
Semifinals
Americano	1	2	3
Audax Rio	0	0	0
America	3	2	5
Sampaio Corrêa	0	1	1

Final
Americano	0
America	1

==== Final ====
29 September 2018
13:10

Americano	0 - 1	America
		52' Quaresma

Nilton Santos, Rio de Janeiro
Referee: Paulo Renato Moreira da Silva Coelho

Campeonato Carioca Série B1
2018 champion
America
3rd title
