= Mateus Pivô =

Brazilian footballer

Personal information
- Full name: Mateus Cardoso Francisco
- Date of birth: 16 December 1997 (age 28)
- Place of birth: Campos dos Goytacazes, Brazil
- Height: 1.85 m (6 ft 1 in)
- Positions: Right-back; right winger

Team information
- Current team: AVS (on loan from Brusque)
- Number: 97

Youth career
- 2011–2014: Goytacaz
- 2015–2016: Carapebus
- 2016: → Campos AA (loan)
- 2017: Grêmio

Senior career*
Years	Team	Apps	(Gls)
2018	Cianorte		
2018	Carapebus		
2018–2019	Hercílio Luz		
2019	Grêmio Anápolis		
2019	Marília		
2020	Operário-MT		
2020	Azuriz		
2021	Vitória-ES	11	(0)
2021–2022	Democrata-GV	24	(0)
2022	Passo Fundo	25	(5)
2022	Ferroviário	4	(0)
2023	São José-RS	11	(4)
2023–	Sampaio Corrêa	1	(0)
2024	→ Vila Nova (loan)	15	(0)
2024	→ Brusque (loan)	28	(3)
2025–	Brusque	32	(1)
2026–	→ AVS (loan)	14	(0)
- * Club domestic league appearances and goals as of 25 May 2026

Mateus Cardoso Francisco (born 16 December 1997), better known as Mateus Pivô, is a Brazilian professional footballer who plays as a right-back for Liga Portugal 2 club AVS on loan from Brusque.

== Career ==
Mateus started his career as a futsal player, acting as a pivot, from which his nickname derives. On the field, he played as a winger for the youth teams of Goytacaz, Carapebus, Campos AA and Grêmio.

As a professional, he played for several clubs, having started his career at Cianorte, and being champion of minor divisions with Azuriz in Paraná. Over the years he started to play as a right back, a position that made him famous for competing in the divisions of the Brazilian Championship, having played for Ferroviário, São José-RS and Sampaio Corrêa, which holds his federative rights.

In 2024, he was loaned to Vila Nova to compete in the Campeonato Goiano, and in April, he was loaned again to Brusque to compete in the 2024 Campeonato Brasileiro Série B. In 2025, Pivô was definitively acquired by Brusque.

== Honours ==
Azuriz

- Campeonato Paranaense Série Prata: 2020
