= Wallace Camilo =

Brazilian footballer

Personal information
- Date of birth: 10 November 1992 (age 34)
- Place of birth: Brazil
- Position: Midfielder

Team information
- Current team: Friburguense (on loan from Resende)

Youth career
- 2008–2013: Atlético Paranaense
- 2011–2012: Nike Academy

Senior career*
Years	Team	Apps	(Gls)
2013	Duque de Caxias	4	(0)
2014	Santa Cruz-RJ	0	(0)
2016	Ceres	0	(0)
2016	Angra dos Reis	0	(0)
2017	Barcelona-RJ	0	(2)
2018–	Resende	0	(0)
2018–	→ Friburguense (loan)		
- * Club domestic league appearances and goals as of 13:28, 8 April 2019 (UTC)

Wallace Camilo (born 10 November 1992) is a Brazilian footballer who currently plays as a midfielder for Friburguense, on loan from Resende.

== Career statistics ==
=== Club ===
As of 8 April 2019.

Club	Season	League			Cup		Other		Total	
Club	Season	Division	Apps	Goals	Apps	Goals	Apps	Goals	Apps	Goals
Duque de Caxias	2013	Série C	4	0	0	0	0	0	4	0
Santa Cruz-RJ	2014	—			0	0	15 (Note: Appearances in Campeonato Carioca III)	0	15	0
Ceres	2016	—			0	0	1 (Note: Appearances in Campeonato Carioca II)	0	1	0
Angra dos Reis	2016	—			2 (Note: Appearances in Copa Rio)	0	0	0	2	0
Barcelona-RJ	2017	—			2	0	19	0	21	0
Resende	2018	—			0	0	5 (Note: Appearances in Campeonato Carioca)	0	5	0
Resende	2019	—			0	0	0	0	0	0
Career total			4	0	4	0	40	0	48	0
