= Marlon (footballer, born 1994) =

Brazilian footballer

Personal information
- Full name: Marlon Matheus Lopes do Nascimento
- Date of birth: 13 February 1994 (age 32)
- Place of birth: Angra dos Reis, Brazil
- Height: 1.77 m (5 ft 10 in)
- Position: Left back

Team information
- Current team: Remo
- Number: 6

Youth career
- Bonsucesso
- 2014: Ituano

Senior career*
Years	Team	Apps	(Gls)
2012–2014	Bonsucesso	32	(0)
2014	Ituano	0	(0)
2015–2016	America-RJ	23	(0)
2016–2017	Luverdense	4	(0)
2017–2018	America-RJ	33	(1)
2019	Cabofriense	6	(0)
2019	Portuguesa-RJ	0	(0)
2020	Madureira	9	(1)
2020–2021	Sampaio Corrêa	25	(0)
2021	→ América Mineiro (loan)	26	(1)
2022–2025	América Mineiro	133	(7)
2026	Cuiabá	20	(1)
2026–	Remo	1	(0)
- * Club domestic league appearances and goals as of 16 April 2026

Marlon Matheus Lopes do Nascimento (born 13 February 1994), simply known as Marlon, is a Brazilian footballer who plays as left back for Remo.

== Club career ==
Marlon was born in Angra dos Reis, Rio de Janeiro, and finished his formation with Bonsucesso. He made his senior debut with the club on 16 September 2012 by starting in a 0–1 Copa Rio away loss against Angra dos Reis, and scored his first goal on 24 October in a 2–4 loss at Bangu.

In 2014, Marlon moved to Ituano, but appeared mainly for the under-20 squad. He joined America-RJ for the 2015 campaign, before signing for Luverdense in April of the following year. He then moved back to América in April 2017, after being rarely used by LEC.

For the 2019 campaign, Marlon represented Cabofriense and Portuguesa-RJ. He agreed to a contract with Madureira on 5 December of that year, before being one of the 11 additions of Sampaio Corrêa for the 2020 Série B on 8 July 2020.

On 28 April 2021, Marlon was loaned to Série A side América Mineiro until May 2022. He made his top tier debut on 30 May, starting in a 0–1 away loss against Athletico Paranaense.

On 30 November 2021, Marlon signed a permanent deal with Coelho until the end of 2024, effective as of the following 1 January.

== Career statistics ==
As of 1 March 2023

Club	Season	League			State League		Cup		Continental		Other		Total	
Club	Season	Division	Apps	Goals	Apps	Goals	Apps	Goals	Apps	Goals	Apps	Goals	Apps	Goals
Bonsucesso	2012	Carioca	—		0	0	—		—		13 (Note: Appearance(s) in Copa Rio)	1	13	1
Bonsucesso	2013	Carioca Série B	—		19	0	—		—		7	0	26	0
Bonsucesso	2014	Carioca	—		13	0	—		—		—		13	0
Bonsucesso	Total		—		32	0	—		—		20	1	52	1
Ituano	2014	Série D	0	0	—		—		—		—		0	0
America-RJ	2015	Carioca Série B	—		8	0	—		—		8	0	16	0
America-RJ	2016	Carioca	—		15	0	—		—		—		15	0
America-RJ	Total		—		23	0	—		—		8	0	31	0
Luverdense	2016	Série B	2	0	—		—		—		—		2	0
Luverdense	2017	Série B	0	0	2	0	0	0	—		1 (Note: Appearance(s) in Copa Verde)	0	3	0
Luverdense	Total		2	0	2	0	0	0	—		1	0	5	0
America-RJ	2017	Carioca Série B1	—		16	1	—		—		—		16	1
America-RJ	2018	Carioca	—		17	0	—		—		4	0	21	0
America-RJ	Total		—		33	1	—		—		4	0	37	1
Cabofriense	2019	Carioca	—		6	0	—		—		—		6	0
Portuguesa-RJ	2019	Série D	0	0	—		—		—		4	0	4	0
Madureira	2020	Carioca	—		9	1	—		—		—		9	1
Sampaio Corrêa	2020	Série B	21	0	1	0	—		—		—		22	0
Sampaio Corrêa	2021	Série B	0	0	3	0	1	0	—		8 (Note: Appearance(s) in Copa do Nordeste)	0	12	0
Sampaio Corrêa	Total		21	0	4	0	1	0	—		8	0	34	0
América Mineiro	2021	Série A	23	1	3	0	—		—		—		26	1
América Mineiro	2022	Série A	29	0	4	0	4	0	8 (Note: Appearance(s) in Copa Libertadores)	1	—		45	1
América Mineiro	2023	Série A	0	0	3	0	0	0	0	0	—		3	0
América Mineiro	Total		52	1	10	0	4	0	8	1	—		74	2
Career total			75	1	119	2	5	0	8	1	41	1	248	5

== Honours ==
America-RJ

- Campeonato Carioca Série B1: 2015, 2018

Luverdense

- Copa Verde: 2017

Sampaio Corrêa

- Campeonato Maranhense: 2020
