= Uirá Marques =

Brazilian footballer

Personal information
- Full name: Uirá de Oliveira Marques
- Date of birth: 22 July 1993 (age 33)
- Place of birth: Camaçari, Brazil
- Height: 1.92 m (6 ft 4 in)
- Position: Defender

Senior career*
Years	Team	Apps	(Gls)
2013–2014	Madureira		
2014–2017	Sampaio Corrêa		
2017	Angra dos Reis		
2017–2019	Goytacaz		
2019–2020	Velez Mostar		
2020	TOŠK Tešanj		
2020–2022	Muaither		
- * Club domestic league appearances and goals

Uirá de Oliveira Marques (born 22 July 1993) commonly known as Uirá, is a Brazilian footballer who plays as a defender.
