= Deyverson =

Brazilian footballer (born 1991)

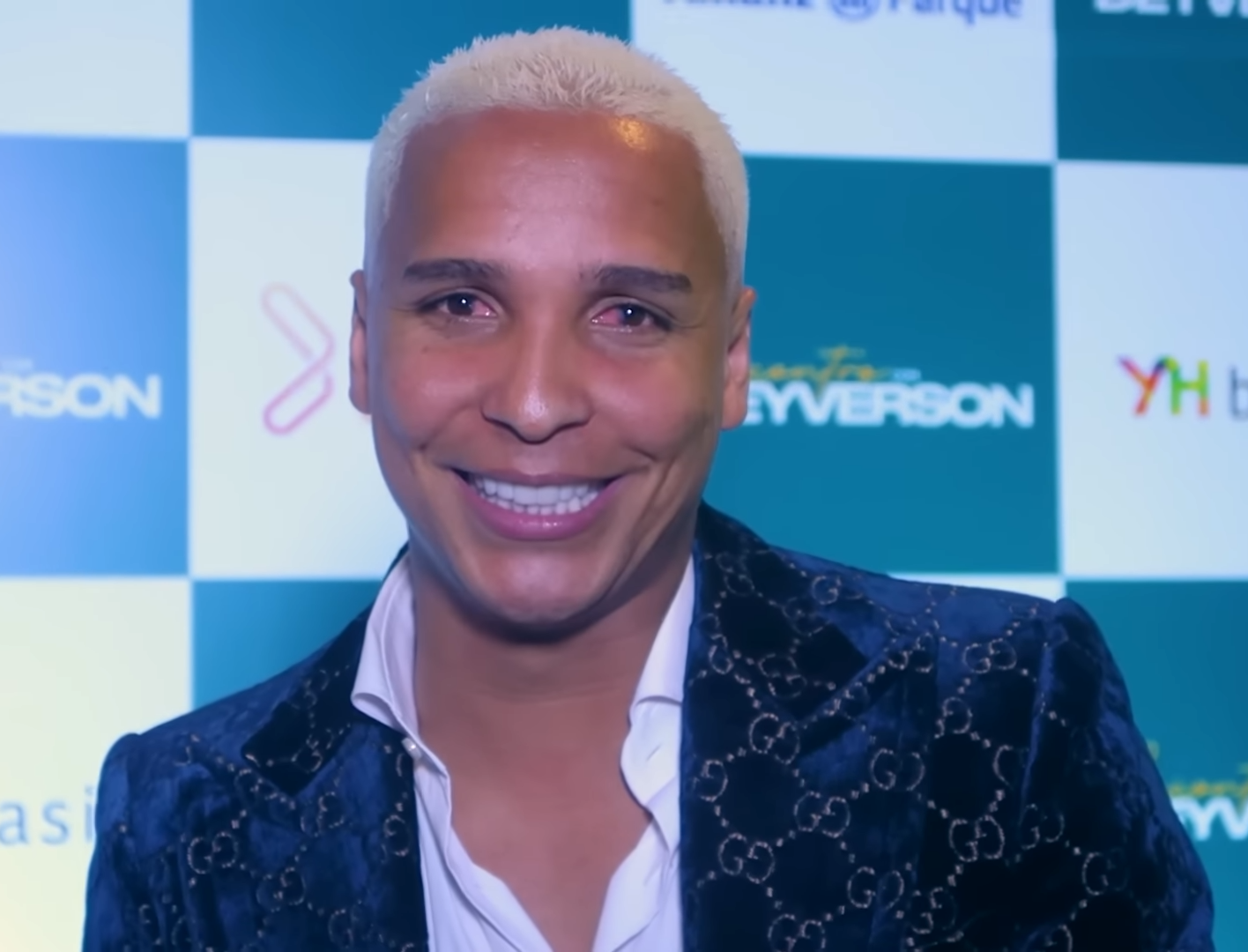
- Deyverson in 2022

Personal information
- Full name: Deyverson Brum Silva
- Date of birth: 8 May 1991 (age 35)
- Place of birth: Rio de Janeiro, Brazil
- Height: 1.87 m (6 ft 2 in)
- Position: Forward

Team information
- Current team: LDU Quito
- Number: 16

Youth career
- 2011: Mangaratibense

Senior career*
Years	Team	Apps	(Gls)
2011–2012	Mangaratibense	31	(18)
2012–2013	Benfica B	29	(8)
2013–2015	Belenenses	24	(11)
2015	→ 1. FC Köln (loan)	8	(1)
2015–2017	Levante	33	(9)
2016–2017	→ Alavés (loan)	32	(7)
2017–2022	Palmeiras	111	(27)
2020	→ Getafe (loan)	5	(0)
2020–2021	→ Alavés (loan)	27	(1)
2022–2024	Cuiabá	71	(26)
2024–2025	Atlético Mineiro	25	(3)
2025–2026	Fortaleza	27	(7)
2026–	LDU Quito	24	(4)
- * Club domestic league appearances and goals as of 26 August 2026

Deyverson Brum Silva (born 8 May 1991), simply known as Deyverson, is a Brazilian professional footballer who plays as a forward for LDU Quito.

== Club career ==
=== Early career ===
Born in Santa Margarida, a neighborhood in Rio de Janeiro, Deyverson began his career with lowly local side Grêmio Mangaratibense in 2011. Known as Acosta at the time, he made his senior debut on 10 March 2011, starting and scoring the opener in a 2–0 Campeonato Carioca Série C home win against Duquecaxiense.

During his two-year period at Mangaratibense, Deyverson scored 18 goals in 31 appearances, being his side's top goalscorer in the two Carioca Série C editions where he played.

=== Benfica ===
On 5 September 2012, after a trial period, Deyverson joined Benfica on a three-year deal. He was placed on the reserve side and made his debut on 19 September 2012, against Tondela. His first goal was in the immediate matchday, scoring the winner in a 2–1 away victory at Oliveirense. He scored 8 league goals throughout the season, being on the starting eleven only 12 times.

=== Belenenses ===
On 6 August 2013, Deyverson joined Belenenses, signing a four-year deal. After settling as the main striker in 2014–15, he scored the only goal in a 1–1 draw at Alvalade.

On 2 February 2015, Deyverson signed a six-month loan deal with Bundesliga team, 1. FC Köln. He scored his first goal on 8 March 2015, against Eintracht Frankfurt.

=== Levante ===
On 27 July 2015, Deyverson signed a four-year deal with La Liga side Levante, for a rumoured €2 million fee. He made his debut in the category on 23 August, starting in a 1–2 home loss against Celta de Vigo.

Deyverson scored his first goal in the main category of Spanish football on 23 September 2015, scoring a last-minute equalizer in a 2–2 home draw against Eibar. On 22 November, he contributed with a brace in a 3–0 away win against Sporting de Gijón, taking his tally up to four goals in ten matches.

On 21 July 2016, after Levante's relegation, Deyverson signed a one-year loan deal with Deportivo Alavés also in the top level, with a buyout clause. On 10 September he scored his first goal for the club, netting the first in a 2–1 historical win against Barcelona at the Camp Nou.

=== Palmeiras ===
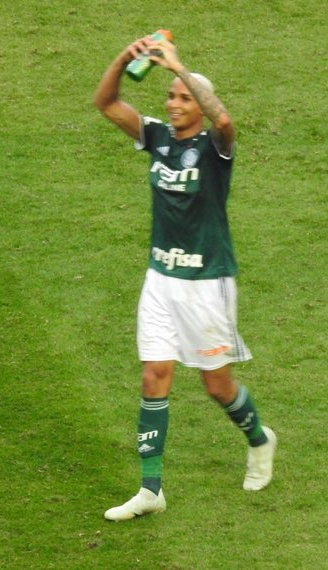
Deyverson with Palmeiras in 2018

On 11 July 2017 Deyverson returned to his homeland, after agreeing to a five-year contract with Palmeiras. In his first season back, he scored seven goals, including a game winner in a 2–1 victory vs Botafogo, and a brace against Flamengo, as Palmeiras finished second in the table. He helped the club lift the 2018 Campeonato Brasileiro Série A by scoring nine goals, but subsequently fell down the pecking order after the arrival of Luiz Adriano.

On 21 January 2020, Deyverson returned to Spain after agreeing to a loan deal with Getafe in the first division for the remainder of the campaign. On 23 August, he returned to Alavés also in a temporary deal, but Alaves decided not to make the transfer permanent after he only scored once in 25 appearances.

On 27 November 2021, Deyverson scored the winning goal of the Copa Libertadores Final in the 5th minute of extra time, following a defensive error from Flamengo midfielder Andreas Pereira and was elected the Man of the Match.

=== Cuiabá ===
On 4 August 2022, Deyverson joined Série A club Cuiabá on a free transfer. He scored his first goal for the club on 4 September, in a 1–1 league draw against São Paulo. After that he added five more goals to his tally, including a spell of three goals in three consecutive matches.

On 29 July 2023, he scored the winning goal in an away 2–1 victory against Internacional. A week later, he assisted Clayson and scored the final goal of the match as Cuiabá beat Flamengo 3–0.

=== Atlético Mineiro ===
On 7 August 2024, Deyverson joined Atlético Mineiro on a contract valid until December 2025. He made his debut appearance for the club on 11 August, in a goalless draw with Cruzeiro in the league. His debut goal was scored on 22 September, in a 3–0 league win over Red Bull Bragantino. Three days later, he was named man of the match for scoring a brace in a 2–0 win over Fluminense in the quarter-finals of the Copa Libertadores, helping Atlético revert a 1–0 defeat in the first leg. On 23 October, Deyverson once again received a Copa Libertadores man of the match award for scoring twice and assisting the third goal in a 3–0 win over River Plate in the first leg of the semi-finals.

=== Fortaleza ===
On 28 March 2025, Deyverson joined Fortaleza on a deal running until December 2026, with the option for an additional year's extension.

== Club statistics ==
As of 15 November 2025

Club	Season	League			State League		National Cup		League Cup		Continental		Other		Total	
Club	Season	Division	Apps	Goals	Apps	Goals	Apps	Goals	Apps	Goals	Apps	Goals	Apps	Goals	Apps	Goals
Mangaratibense	2011	Carioca Série C	—		14	9	—		—		—		—		14	9
Mangaratibense	2012	Carioca Série C	—		17	9	—		—		—		—		17	9
Mangaratibense	Total		—		31	18	—		—		—		—		31	18
Benfica B	2012–13	Segunda Liga	29	8	—		—		—		—		—		29	8
Belenenses	2013–14	Primeira Liga	8	3	—		0	0	1	0	—		—		9	3
Belenenses	2014–15	Primeira Liga	16	8	—		4	1	5	0	—		—		25	9
Belenenses	Total		24	11	—		4	1	6	0	—		—		34	12
1. FC Köln (loan)	2014–15	Bundesliga	8	1	—		1	1	—		—		—		9	2
Levante	2015–16	La Liga	33	9	—		0	0	—		—		—		33	9
Alavés (loan)	2016–17	La Liga	32	7	—		3	0	—		—		—		35	7
Palmeiras	2017	Série A	19	7	—		—		—		1 (Note: Appearance(s) in Copa Libertadores)	0	—		20	7
Palmeiras	2018	Série A	26	9	2	0	3	0	—		8	0	—		39	9
Palmeiras	2019	Série A	24	5	7	1	3	0	—		7	2	—		41	8
Palmeiras	2021	Série A	26	4	—		0	0	—		5	1	2 (Note: Appearance(s) in FIFA Club World Cup)	0	33	5
Palmeiras	2022	Série A	0	0	7	1	0	0	—		0	0	0	0	7	1
Palmeiras	Total		95	25	16	2	6	0	—		21	3	2	0	140	30
Getafe (loan)	2019–20	La Liga	5	0	—		0	0	—		2 (Note: Appearance(s) in UEFA Europa League)	1	—		7	1
Alavés (loan)	2020–21	La Liga	27	1	—		2	0	—		—		—		29	1
Cuiabá	2022	Série A	16	6	—		—		—		—		—		16	6
Cuiabá	2023	Série A	36	12	5	3	1	0	—		—		3 (Note: Appearance(s) in Copa Verde)	2	45	17
Cuiabá	2024	Série A	4	1	10	4	2	0	—		4 (Note: Appearance(s) in Copa Sudamericana)	3	2	2	22	10
Cuiabá	Total		56	19	15	7	3	0	—		4	3	5	4	83	33
Atlético Mineiro	2024	Série A	17	2	—		—		—		6	4	—		23	6
Atlético Mineiro	2025	Série A	—		8	1	2	1	—		—		—		10	2
Atlético Mineiro	Total		17	2	8	1	2	1	—		6	4	—		33	8
Fortaleza	2025	Série A	20	7	—		—		—		8	2	0	0	28	9
Career total			346	90	70	28	21	3	6	0	41	19	7	4	483	136

== Honours ==
Palmeiras

- Campeonato Brasileiro Série A: 2018
- Copa Libertadores: 2021
- Recopa Sudamericana: 2022
- Campeonato Paulista: 2022
- FIFA Club World Cup runner-up: 2021

Cuiabá

- Campeonato Mato-Grossense: 2023, 2024

Atlético Mineiro

- Copa Libertadores runner-up: 2024
- Campeonato Mineiro: 2025
