= Campeonato da Cidade de Campos =

Football league in Brazil

The Campeonato da Cidade de Campos (Campos City Championship in English), also known as Campeonato de Campos (Campos Championship in English), Campeonato Campista (Campista Championship in English) and Liga Campista (Campista League in English) was the football league of the city of Campos dos Goytacazes, Rio de Janeiro, Brazil.

From 1914 to 1951, was the amateur era of the competition. In 1952, started the professional era.

The league ended in 1979, because it was suffering the competition of the more popular Campeonato Carioca.

== List of champions ==
- 1914 Goytacaz
- 1915 Americano
- 1917 Rio Branco
- 1918 Campos
- 1919 Americano
- 1920 Goytacaz
- 1921 Americano
- 1922 Americano
- 1923 Americano
- 1924 Campos
- 1925 Americano
- 1926 Goytacaz
- 1927 there was no champion, and the competition was annulled.
- 1928 Rio Branco
- 1929 Rio Branco
- 1930 Americano
- 1931 Rio Branco
- 1932 Campos and Goytacaz¹
- 1933 Goytacaz
- 1934 Americano
- 1935 Americano
- 1936 Aliança
- 1937 Aliança
- 1938 Aliança
- 1939 Americano
- 1940 Goytacaz
- 1941 Goytacaz
- 1942 Goytacaz
- 1943 Goytacaz
- 1944 Americano
- 1945 Goytacaz
- 1946 Americano
- 1947 Americano
- 1948 Goytacaz
- 1949 Rio Branco
- 1950 Americano
- 1951 Goytacaz
- 1952 São José
- 1953 Goytacaz
- 1954 Americano
- 1955 Goytacaz
- 1956 Campos
- 1957 Goytacaz
- 1958 Rio Branco
- 1959 Goytacaz
- 1960 Goytacaz
- 1961 Rio Branco
- 1962 Rio Branco
- 1963 Goytacaz
- 1964 Americano
- 1965 Americano
- 1966 Goytacaz
- 1967 Americano
- 1968 Americano
- 1969 Americano
- 1970 Americano
- 1971 Americano
- 1972 Americano
- 1973 Americano
- 1974 Americano
- 1975 Americano
- 1976 Campos
- 1977 Americano and Goytacaz²
- 1978 Americano
- 1979 Americano

¹There were two champions, because there were two different competitions, promoted by two differente leagues.

²Because of the lack of dates to the finals, the league proclaimed the two clubs as champions;.

== Titles by team ==
- Americano 27 times
- Goytacaz 20 times
- Rio Branco 8 times
- Campos 5 times
- Aliança 3 times
- São José 1 time

== See also ==
- Campeonato Fluminense
