= Wladimir Garotinho =

Brazilian politician (born 1985)

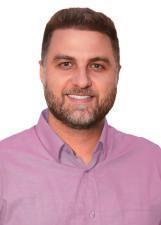
- Garotinho in 2024

Member-elect of the Chamber of Deputies
- Assuming office 1 February 2027
- Constituency: Rio de Janeiro
- In office 1 February 2019 – 1 January 2021
- Constituency: Rio de Janeiro

Mayor of Campos dos Goytacazes
- In office 1 January 2021 – 2 April 2026
- Vice Mayor: Frederico Paes
- Preceded by: Rafael Diniz
- Succeeded by: Frederico Paes

Personal details
- Born: Wladimir Barros Assed Matheus de Oliveira; 10 January 1985 (age 41) Campos dos Goytacazes, Rio de Janeiro, Brazil
- Party: PL (2009–2018, 2026–present)
- Other political affiliations: PRP (2018–2019); Patriota (2019); PSD (2019–2022); UNIÃO (2022–2023); PP (2023–2026)
- Parents: Anthony Garotinho (father); Rosângela Matheus (mother)
- Relatives: Clarissa Garotinho (sister)

Wladimir Barros Assed Matheus de Oliveira, better known as Wladimir Garotinho (born 10 January 1985), is a Brazilian politician serving as mayor of Campos dos Goytacazes since 2021. From 2019 to 2021, he was a member of the Chamber of Deputies. He is the son of Anthony Garotinho and Rosângela Matheus, and the brother of Clarissa Garotinho.

Political offices
Preceded by Rafael Diniz	Mayor of Campos dos Goytacazes; 2021–2026	Succeeded by Frederico Paes
