= Allan (footballer, born 1984) =

Brazilian footballer

Personal information
- Full name: Allan Barreto da Silva
- Date of birth: August 9, 1984 (age 42)
- Place of birth: Rio de Janeiro, Brazil
- Height: 1.72 m (5 ft 8 in)
- Position: Striker

Team information
- Current team: São Cristóvão

Senior career*
Years	Team	Apps	(Gls)
2004–2008	Vasco da Gama		
2006	→ Duque de Caxias (loan)		
2007–2008	→ Sport (loan)		
2009	Tubarão		
2010	América		
2010	Vila Nova		
2011	Cabofriense		
2011–2012	Olaria		
2012	ABC		
2013	América		
2014	Madureira		
2014	Barra da Tijuca		
2015–	Portuguesa da Ilha		
2017–	→ América (Loan)		
- * Club domestic league appearances and goals

Allan Barreto da Silva (born August 9, 1984), or simply Allan, is a Brazilian striker. He currently plays for São Cristóvão.

== Contract ==
- Sport (Loan) 8 January 2008 to 31 December 2008
- Vasco 3 January 2005 to 3 January 2010
