= Arizão =

Multi-use stadium in Campos dos Goytacazes, Brazil

Coordinates: 21°45′44.31″S 41°18′59.41″W

- Estádio Ary de Oliveira e Souza
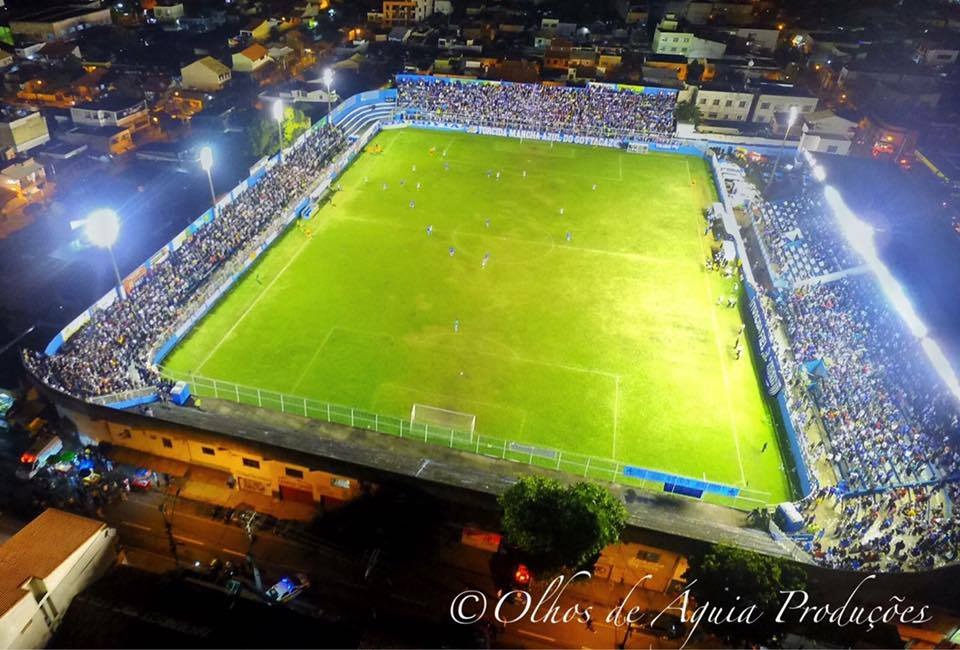
- Interactive map of Arizão
- Address: Campos dos Goytacazes; Brazil
- Owner: Goytacaz Futebol Clube
- Capacity: 15,000
- Type: Multi-Use
- Record attendance: 14,708
- Current use: Football Matches

Construction
- Built: 1938
- Years active: 84

Estádio Ary de Oliveira e Souza, usually known as Arizão, is a multi-use stadium located in Campos dos Goytacazes, Brazil. It is used mostly for football matches and hosts the home matches of Goytacaz Futebol Clube. The stadium has a maximum capacity of 15,000 people and was built in 1938. Arizão is owned by Goytacaz Futebol Clube. The stadium is named after Ary de Oliveira e Souza, who was a former president of Goytacaz Futebol Clube.

== History ==
In 1938, the works on Arizão were completed. The inaugural match was played on January 9 of that year, when Goytacaz beat Internacional de Campos 2–1. The first goal of the stadium was scored by Goytacaz's Otto Nogueira.

The stadium's attendance record currently stands at 14,708, set on April 13, 1986, when Goytacaz and Flamengo drew 1–1.
