= Campos Atlético Associação =

Campos
- Full name: Campos Atlético Associação
- Nickname(s): Roxinho do Parque Leopoldina
- Founded: October 26, 1912
- Ground: Estádio Ary de Oliveira; Campos dos Goytacazes–RJ, Brazil
- Capacity: 15,000
- President: Márcio Reinaldo da Conceição
Home colours	Away colours	colours

Campos Atlético Associação is a Brazilian football team from Campos dos Goytacazes, Rio de Janeiro State.

== History ==
Created by idealization of Wanderley Barreto its first president, coming up with the name of Campos Athletic Association. Was champion in Campeonato Campista the years 1918, 1924, 1932, 1956 and 1976, in addition to the Rio de Janeiro Zona Norte Championship in 1956, which was not disputed in the field but that must have the title recognized by the current federation. There is also the conquest of the title of champion of the Zona Norte and Rio de Janeiro in the year 1976.

In 2015, he returned to professional football, to compete in the Série C of the Campeonato Carioca and getting access and with it playing the Série B. In 2016 rose to the First Division in Carioca by winning in the Triangular Final of Série B.

== Honours ==
=== State ===
- Taça Corcovado
  - Winners (1): 2016

=== City ===
- Campeonato da Cidade de Campos
  - Winners (5): 1918, 1924, 1932, 1956, 1976
- Torneio Inicio do Campeonato Campista
  - Winners (1) 1967
- Taça José Antônio Ferreira de Araújo
  - Winners (1): 1975
