= Ceres Futebol Clube =

Ceres
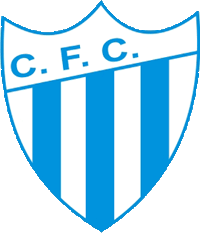
- Full name: Ceres Futebol Clube
- Nickname(s): Alviceleste
- Founded: July 10, 1933
- Ground: Estádio João Francisco dos Santos
- Capacity: 3,000
Home colors	Away colors

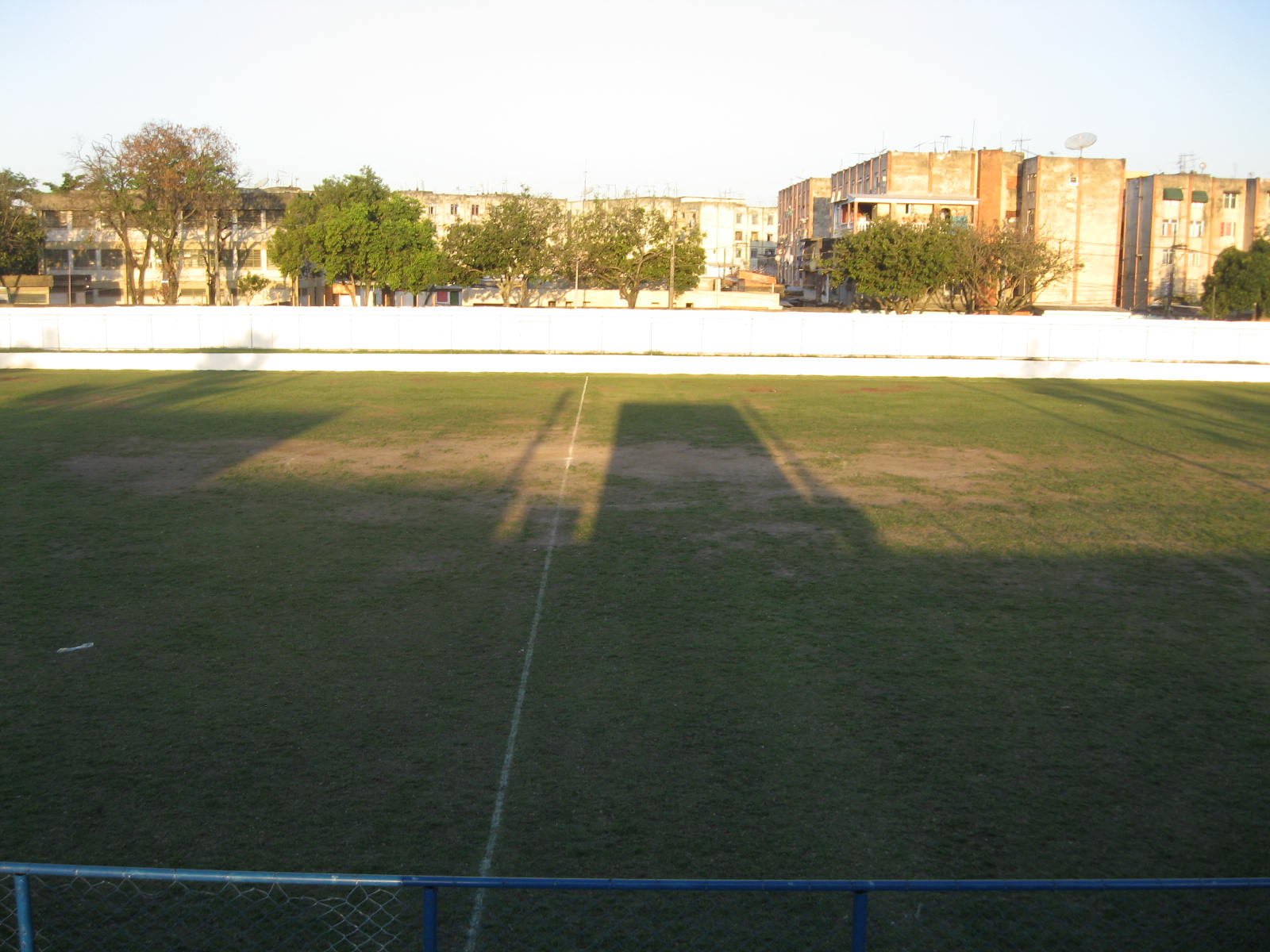
Estádio João Francisco dos Santos

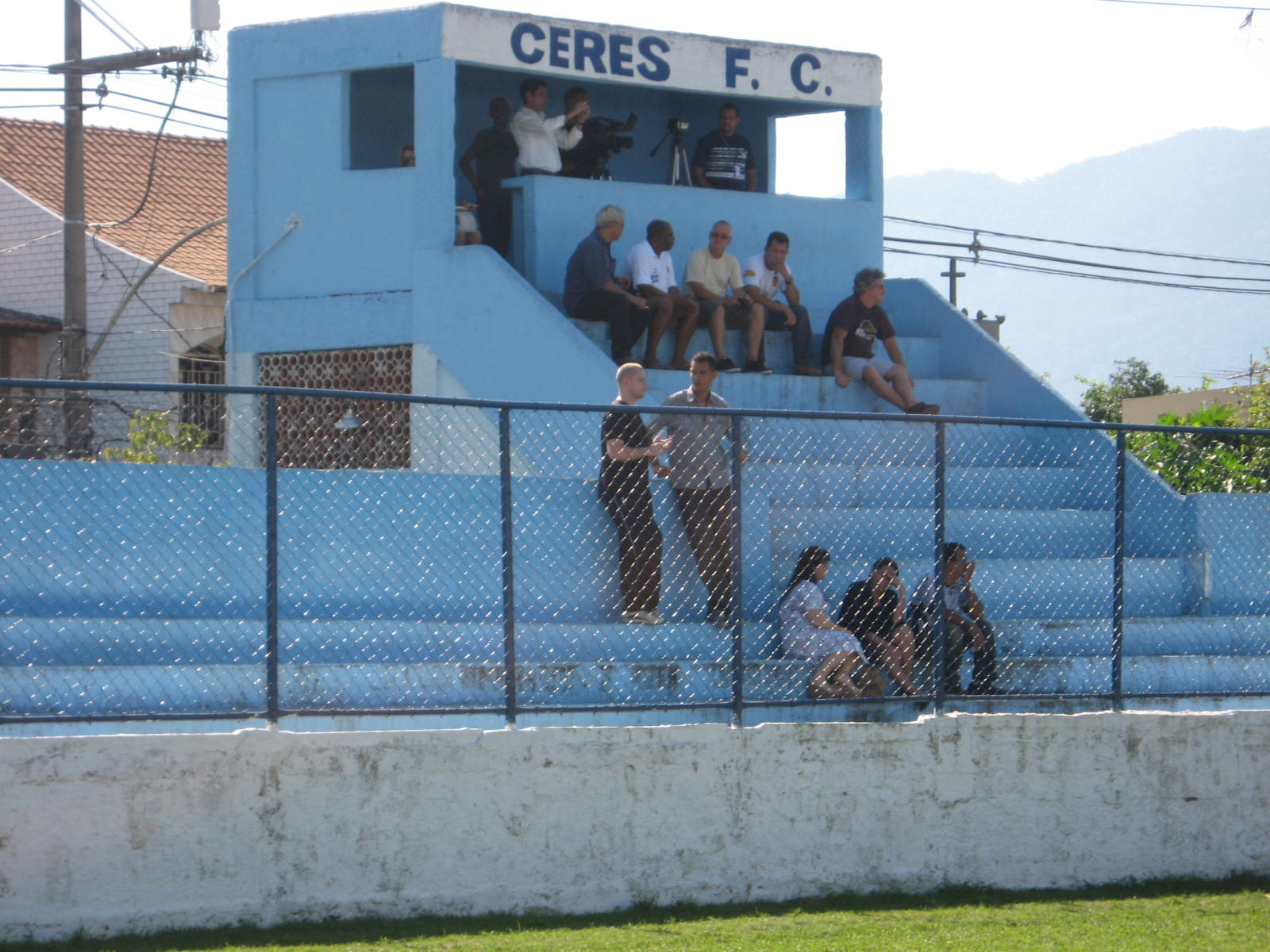
Estádio João Francisco dos Santos - administration block and viewing area

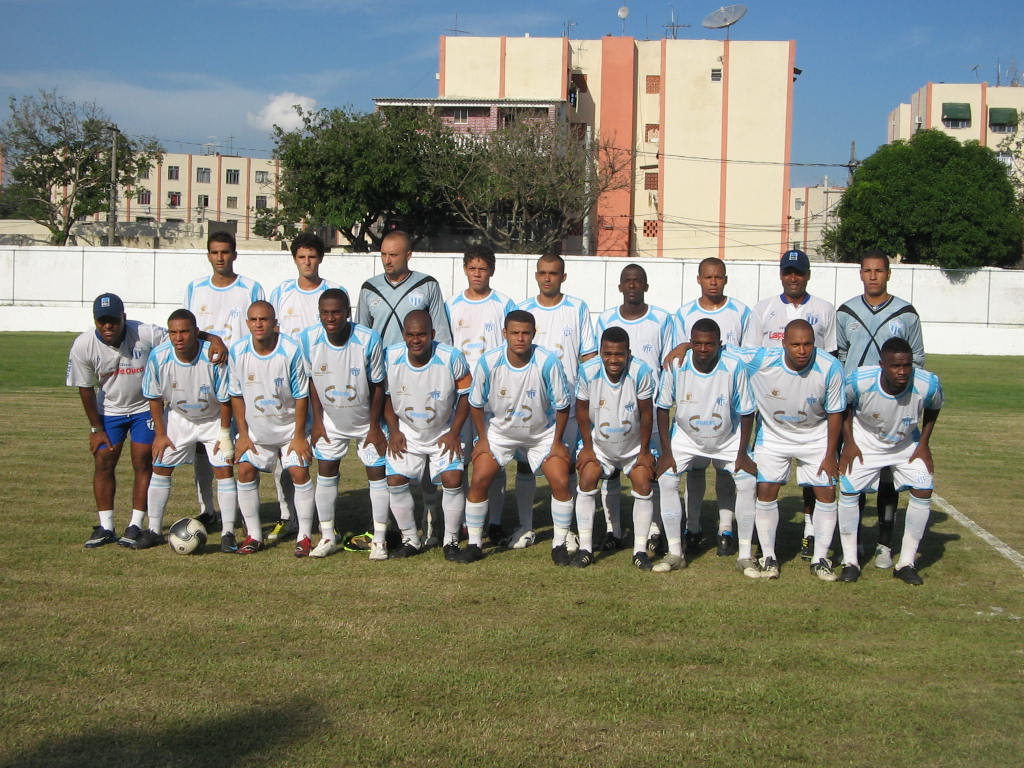
Team photo from the 2010 season

Ceres Futebol Clube, usually known simply as Ceres, is a Brazilian football team from the city of Rio de Janeiro, Rio de Janeiro state, founded on July 10, 1933.

== History ==
On July 10, 1933, Ceres Futebol Clube was founded by sailors of the First Naval District (Primeiro Distrito Naval), who lived at Ceres Street, in Bangu neighborhood.

== Honours ==
=== State ===
- Campeonato Carioca Série B1: 1990
- Campeonato Carioca Série B2: 2019

=== Others ===
- Departamento Autônomo: 1985

(Departamento Autônomo was the name for the Amateur Carioca Soccer Championship)

== Stadium ==
The home stadium Estádio João Francisco dos Santos has a capacity of 3,000 people.

== Colors ==
The official colors are blue and white.
