= Grêmio Mangaratibense =

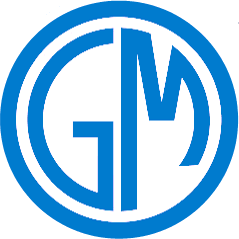
- Full name: Grêmio Mangaratibense
- Founded: 21 January 2009
- Ground: Estádio Municipal José Maria de Brito Barros, Mangaratiba, Rio de Janeiro state, Brazil
- Capacity: 1,000
- President: Municipal José Maria de Brito Barros
- Head coach: João Francisco Nobrega
Home colors	Away colors

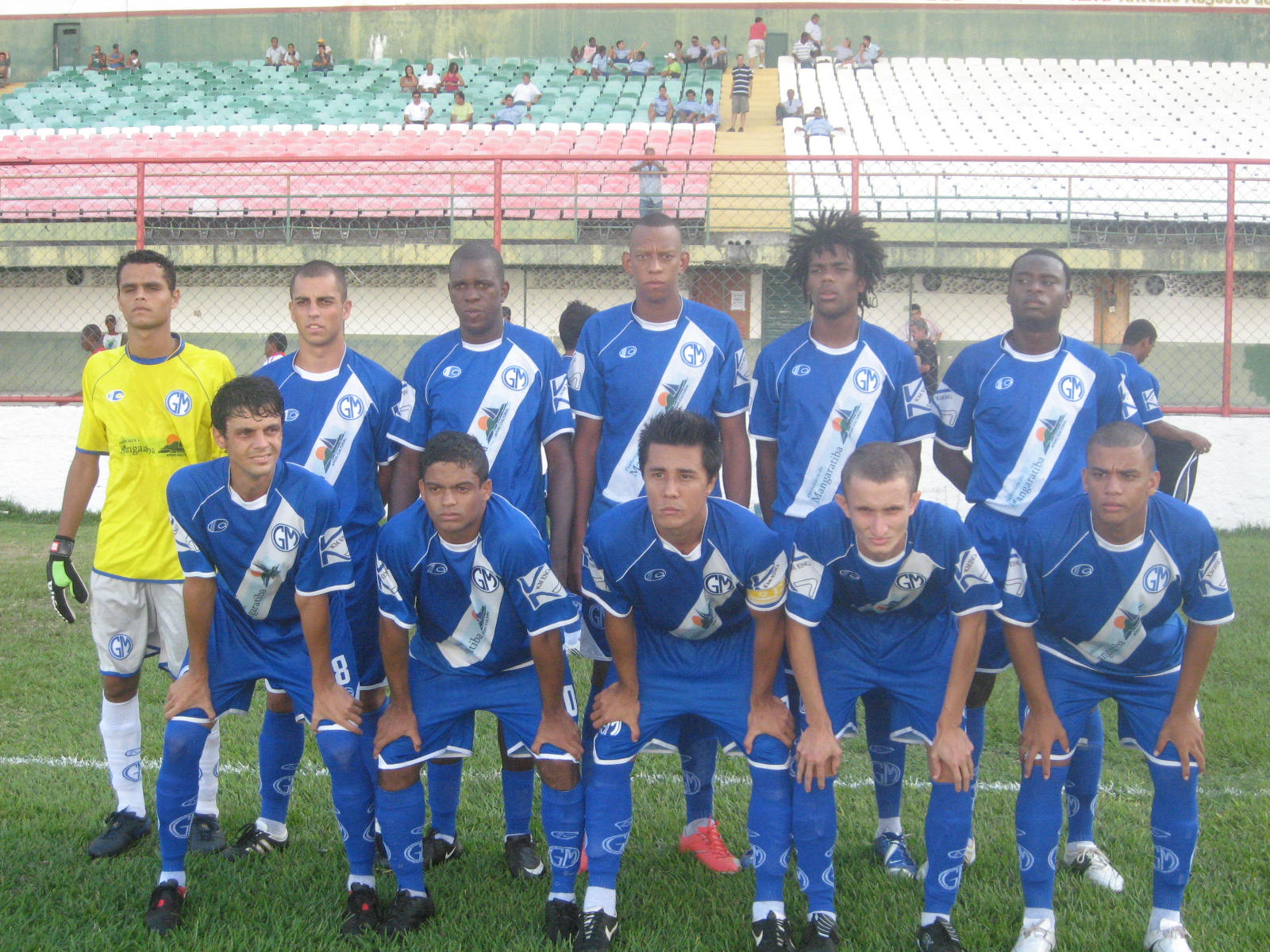
Team photo from the 2010 season

Grêmio Mangaratibense, sometimes known as Mangaratibense, is a Brazilian football club based in Mangaratiba, Rio de Janeiro state.

Founded on 21 January 2009 as a replacement to dissolved Grêmio Olímpico Mangaratiba, the club played his first appearance in Campeonato Carioca Série C in 2010. It achieved promotion to Série B in 2013, after finishing fourth.

== Stadium ==
Mangaratibense play their home games at Estádio Municipal José Maria de Brito Barros.
