= Associação Atlética Carapebus =

Carapebus
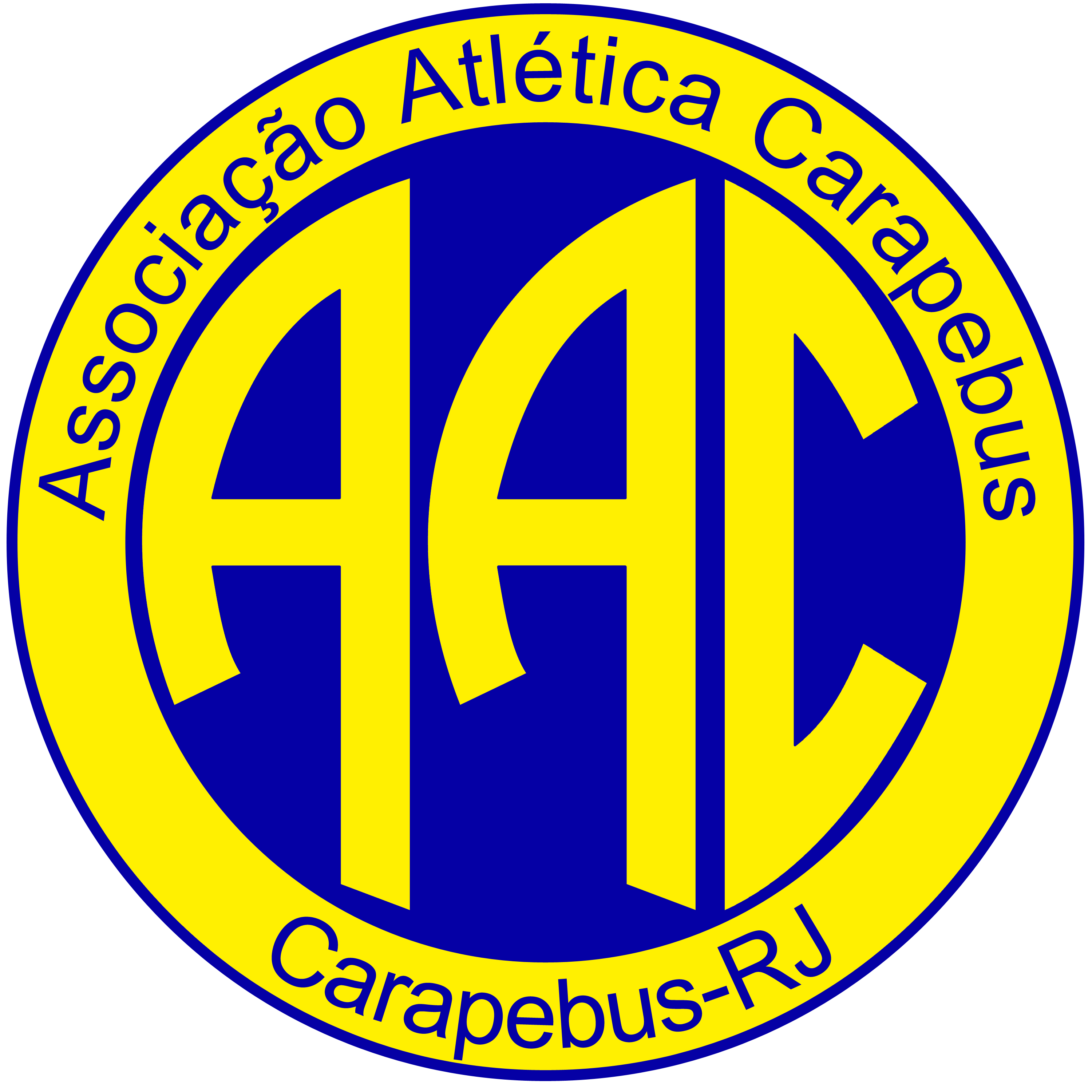
- Full name: Associação Atlética Carapebus
- Nickname(s): Carroça da Usina
- Founded: April 12, 2006
- Ground: Estádio Antônio Carneiro da Silva, Carapebus, Rio de Janeiro state, Brazil
Home colors	Away colors

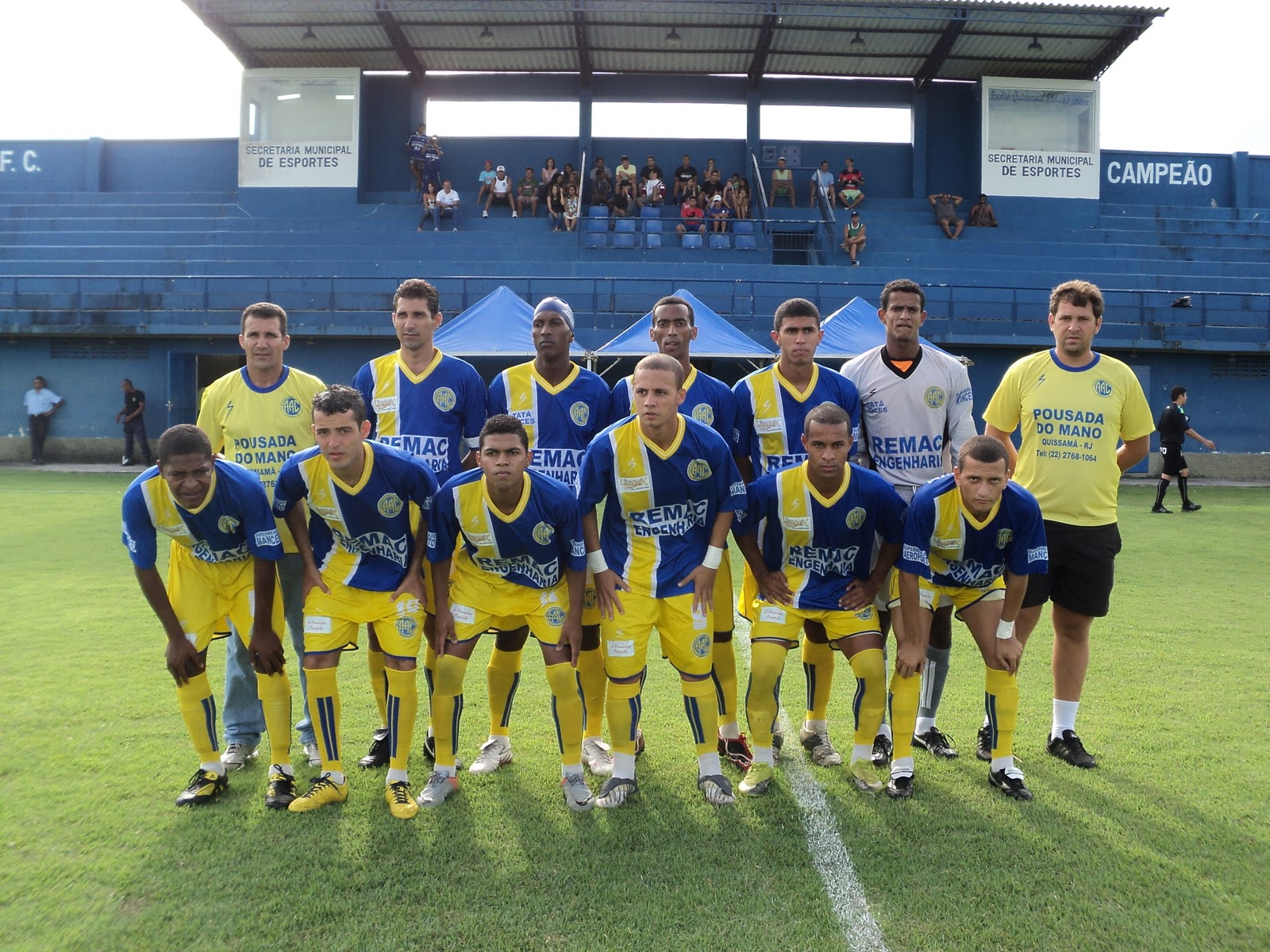
Team photo from the 2011 season

Associação Atlética Carapebus, commonly known as Carapebus, is a Brazilian football club based in Carapebus, Rio de Janeiro state.

== History ==
The club was founded on April 12, 2006, by the brothers Lenildo and Luciano Lamoglia Bastos. The club competed in their first professional competition in 2006, when they were eliminated in the First Stage of the Campeonato Carioca Third Level. After this performance, Carapebus closed its football department.

After returning to official competitions in 2011, Carapebus gained promotion to the 2012 edition of the Campeonato Carioca Second Level. Due to financial problems, the team played without being paid, but still they finished in the third place of the 2011 Campeonato Carioca Third Level, after beating América de Três Rios in the third-place playoff.

== Stadium ==
Associação Atlética Carapebus play their home games at Estádio Antônio Carneiro da Silva, also known as Estádio Municipal.

== Honours ==
- Taça Maracanã
  - Winners (1): 2020
