= Americano FC =

Americano
- Full name: Americano Futebol Clube
- Nickname: Cano
- Founded: June 1, 1914 (112 years ago)
- Ground: Estádio Godofredo Cruz
- Capacity: 25,000
- President: Carlos Abreu
- League: Campeonato Carioca
- 2020: Carioca, 14th
Home colors	Away colors

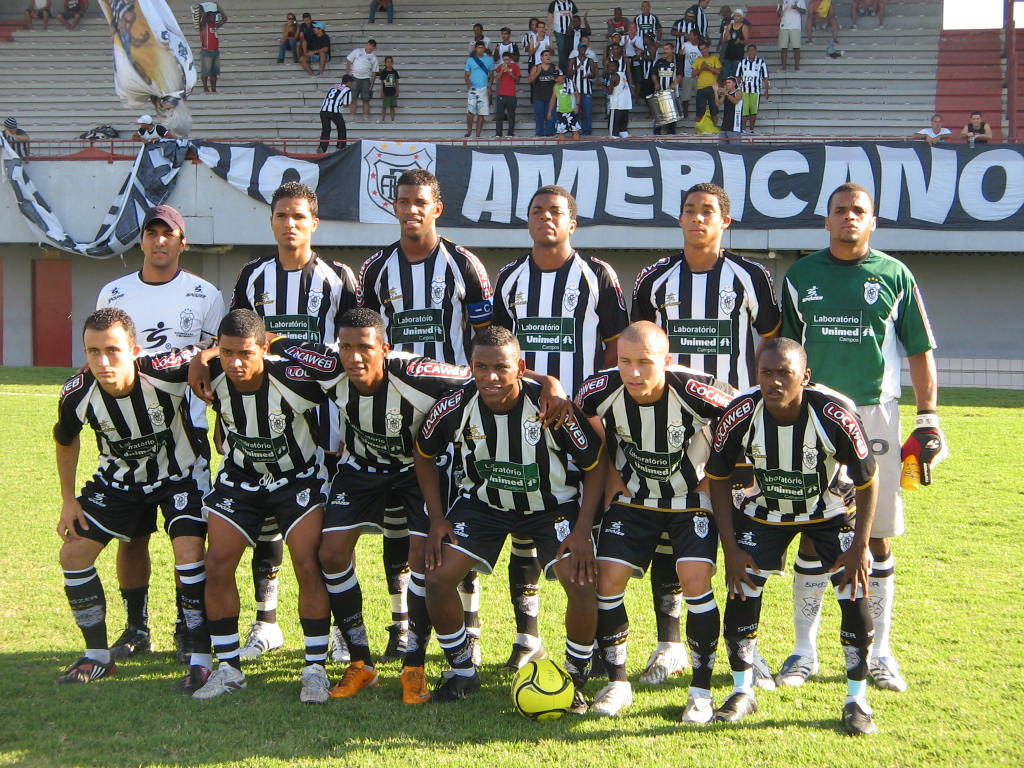
Team photo from the 2008 season

Americano Futebol Clube is a Brazilian football club from Campos dos Goytacazes, in state of Rio de Janeiro. Founded on 1914, they play in black and white stripes, black shorts and socks.

== History ==
The club was founded on June 1, 1914 by the Uruguayan Bertoni brothers, after watching a game between America and a Campos combined team, won by 3–1 by the former. The club was originally planned to be named América Football Club, after America from city of Rio de Janeiro.

In 2002, Americano won both the Taça Guanabara and the Taça Rio, but was defeated by Fluminense in both legs (2–0 and 3–1) of the Campeonato Carioca final. In 2004, Americano reached the final four of the Campeonato Brasileiro Série C, but finished in the third position, after União Barbarense and Gama, and was not promoted to the Série B.

== Honours ==
=== Official tournaments ===
State
Competitions	Titles	Seasons
Campeonato Fluminense	5^{s}	1964, 1965, 1968, 1969, 1975
Copa Rio	1	2018
Campeonato Carioca Série A2	1	2026

- record
- ^{s} shared record

=== Others tournaments ===
==== National unofficial ====
- Copa União - Módulo Azul (1): 1987

==== State ====
- Taça Guanabara (1): 2002
- Taça Rio (1): 2002
- Taça Josadibe Jappour (1): 1976
- Troféu Moisés Mathias de Andrade (1): 2009
- Campeonato do Interior Copa Rio stage (3): 1991, 1992, 1993
- Taça Santos Dumont (2): 2018, 2026
- Taça Corcovado (1): 2015
- Torneio Interior (1): 2016

==== City ====
- Campeonato da Cidade de Campos (27): 1915, 1919, 1921, 1922, 1923, 1925, 1930, 1934, 1935, 1939, 1944, 1946, 1947, 1950, 1954, 1964, 1965, 1967, 1968, 1969, 1970, 1971, 1972, 1973, 1974, 1975, 1977
- Torneio Inicio do Campeonato Campista (4): 1957, 1961, 1964, 1965
- Torneio Cidade de Campos dos Goytacazes (3): 1968, 1970, 1971
- Taça Jane Figueiredo (1): 1922

=== Runners-up ===
- Campeonato Carioca (1): 2002
- Campeonato Fluminense (4): 1964 Extra, 1971, 1974, 1978
- Copa Rio (3): 1991, 2008, 2017
- Campeonato Carioca Série A2 (1): 2018

== Stadium ==
Americano's stadium is Estádio Godofredo Cruz, with a maximum capacity of 25,000 people.

== Logo and anthem ==
The nine red stars on Americano's logo represent the nine consecutive Campeonato da Cidade de Campos titles. The golden star represents the 1987, Brazilian Third Division title. The club's official anthem was composed by Pereira Júnior.

== Rivalries ==
Americano's biggest rivalry is with Goytacaz, with whom they play the derby called Goytacano.

== Former players ==
- (Brazil) Jacksen F. Tiago (1992)
