= São Gonçalo Futebol Clube (RN) =

São Gonçalo
- Full name: São Gonçalo Futebol Clube
- Nickname(s): Leões do amarante Touro
- Founded: 28 July 1999
- Dissolved: 2009; 16 years ago
- Ground: Estádio Alçapão do Touro, São Gonçalo do Amarante, Rio Grande do Norte state, Brazil
- Capacity: 5,000
- President: Jessé Tavares
- Website: http://www.saogoncalofc.com.br
Home colours	Away colours

São Gonçalo Futebol Clube, commonly known as São Gonçalo, was a Brazilian football club based in São Gonçalo do Amarante, Rio Grande do Norte state. They competed in the Série C twice and in the Copa do Brasil once.

== History ==
São Gonçalo Futebol Clube, the "Bull", was founded from the dream of sportsman Francisco Potiguar Cavalcanti Júnior (Poti Júnior), to see his municipality participating in the elite of football of the Rio Grande State North.

His dream came true on July 29, 1999 when Poti Júnior, after receiving an invitation, from the President of FNF, Nilson Gomes, to participate in the state championship of the 1st division, managed to gather a group of sixty-nine friends to found São Gonçalo Futebol Clube.

However, unable to assume presidency because of the tremendous responsibility of also being the mayor of his land, São Gonçalo do Amarante, Poti and the other founders, reached an agreement for athlete Alexandre Carlos Cavalcanti to be the first president of SGFC.

Poti Júnior had his name hailed unanimously as honorary president of the SGFC and that night it was decided that the team mascot would be the image of an ox, named after the most traditional folk dance of the municipality which is the Bumba Meu Boi. However, the mascot was changed to a bull, which today is a strong mark in Rio Grande football.

At the same meeting it was decided that red, blue and white (tricolour) would be the colors of SGFC, referring to the colors of the municipality's flag.

The address used by São Gonçalo Futebol Clube, since its creation, is the home of the late Poti Cavalcanti, former mayor of the municipality and the father of Poti Júnior and Alexandre Cavalcanti. This address located in the City Centre, is expected to change as the SGFC is building a training centre, where its administrative headquarters will be located, in addition to accommodation, locker rooms and cafeterias.

Today, SGFC has three torcidas organizadas, the "Nação Tricolor" (the Tricolour Nation) chaired by John Lucas Cavalcanti de Sena; the "Touro Tricolor São-gonçalense" (the São-gonçalense bull tricolour) which is headed by Paulo Sérgio de Morais; and the "Força Jovem" (the Youth Force) which is controlled by Poti Cavalcanti Neto, along with the 17-year-old nephew of Poti Júnior and the son of Alexandre Cavalcanti, journalist Paulo Tarcisio Cavalcanti.

São Gonçalo do Amarante has always been considered as one of the superstars of developing homegrown footballers, especially, among others, Odilon, Gonzaga, Ribeiro, Odissé, Ze Ireno, Tito, Assisi and Paulinho, mainly because it was the only city to win the traditional Interior Football Championship, known as Matutão, five times.

In 2001, the second year of its history, São Gonçalo RN attempted to win Série C. To accomplish this feat, they had to set up a high-level team to unseat the duo ABC and América. Poti Júnior, honorary president of the club, hired a young, but experienced coaching staff. They included coach Edson Boaro (former player of the Brazilian team of 1986) and fitness coach Toninho Cajuru, who were responsible for forming the new team. The board brought in Mardônio and striker Gerônimo from Ríver; the latter being Ríver's top scorer in the Copa JH. The club was short of their expectations and finished in fourth place. In the playoffs of the third national division, the first stage went well, however in the second they collapsed and finished last in Group 2, which was led by Atlético Goianiense.

In 2003, the club competed again in the Série C in 2003, when they were eliminated in the First Stage. Although, they won a place at the 2004 Copa do Brasil.

In 2004, the club played, in addition, in the Copa do Brasil. However, they were eliminated in the first round by Prudentópolis. Motivated after coming 2nd place in the 2003 Série C, the management directors assembled a team that would be considered title contenders. Players came from the southeast of Brasil, like Tiago, Everton and Rodrigão, that would shine.

In 2005, São Gonçalo RN won the Torneio Início do Rio Grande do Norte (Torneio Início are various football competitions in Brazil that usually last a day).

The Bull, as dubbed by fans and the press, participated in the Primeira divisão do Campeonato Potiguar (the Rio Grande First Division Championship) until 2008. In 2009, they stopped playing in the league because of financial difficulties.

== Honours ==
- Campeonato Potiguar
  - Runners-up (2): 2000, 2003

== Stadium ==
São Gonçalo Futebol Clube play their home games at Estádio Luiz Rios Bacurau, nicknamed Estádio Alçapão do Touro. The stadium has a maximum capacity of 5,000 people.
