= Carapebus =

- Municipality
- Município de Carapebus
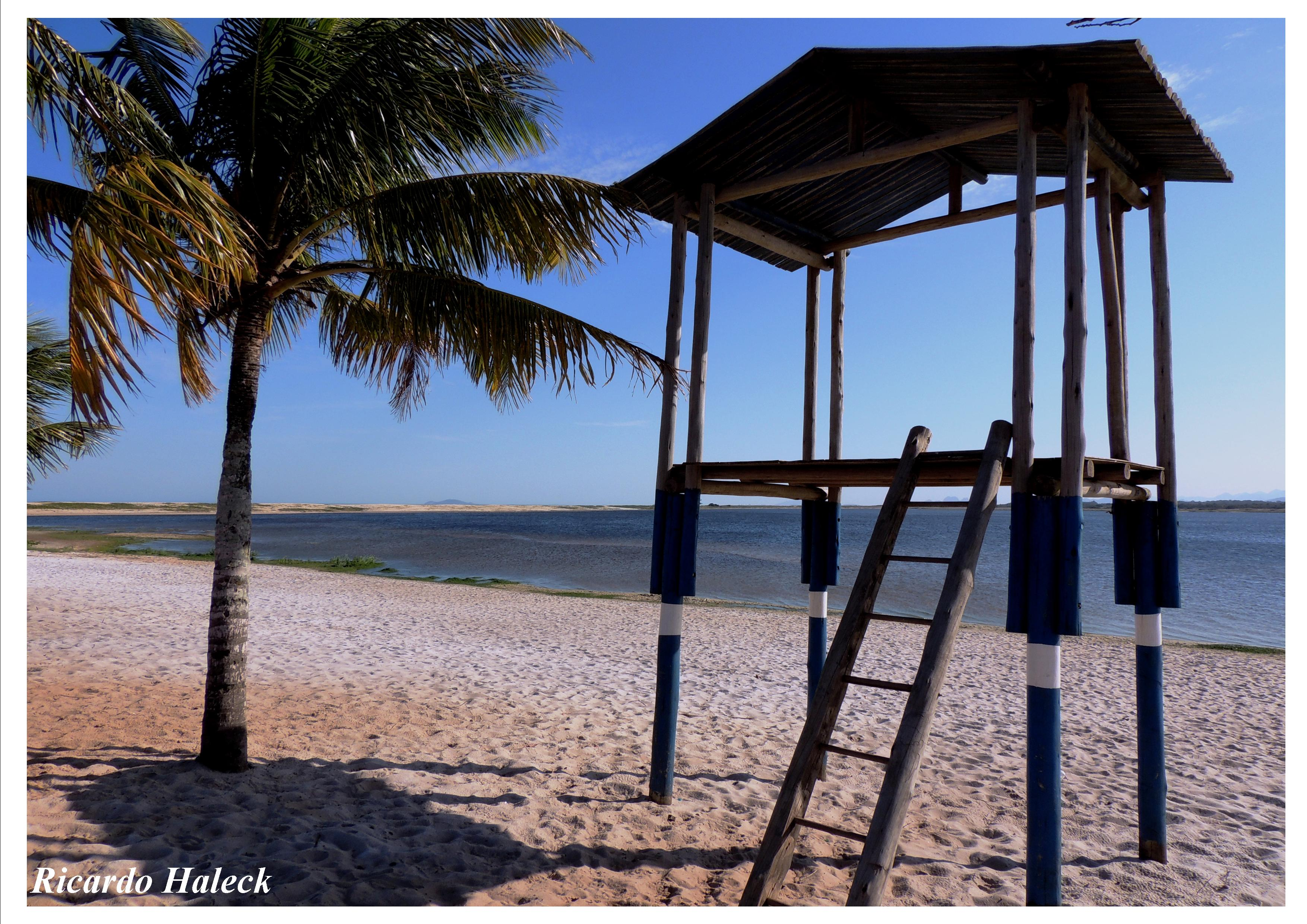

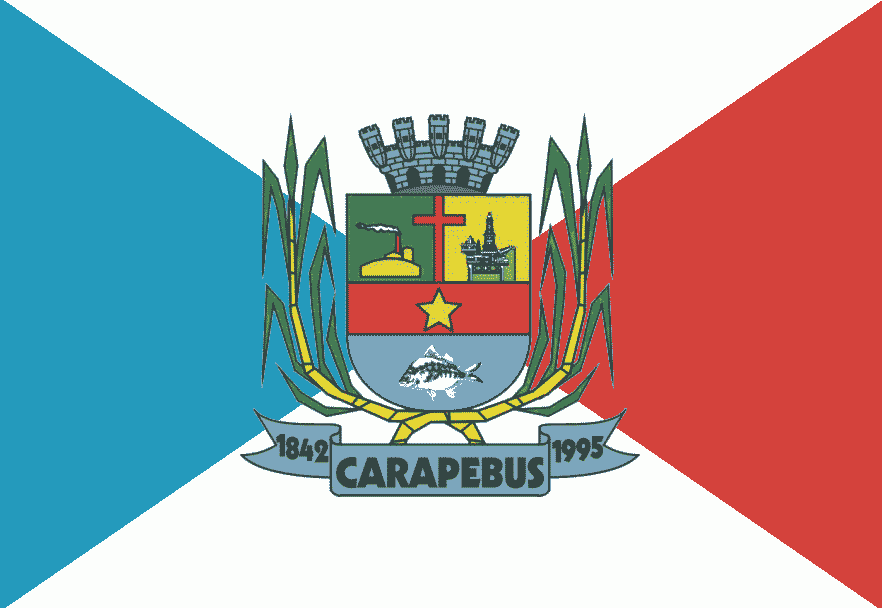
- Flag Coat of arms

- Location of Carabebus in the state of Rio de Janeiro

- Location of Carapebus in Brazil
- Coordinates: 22°11′13″S 41°39′39″W
- Country: Brazil
- Region: Southeast
- State: Rio de Janeiro

Government
  - Prefeito: Christiane Cordeiro (PP)

Area
  - Total: 305.501 km^{2} (117.955 sq mi)
- Elevation: 15 m (49 ft)

Population (2020)
  - Total: 16,586
- Time zone: UTC−3 (BRT)

Carapebus (Portuguese pronunciation: [kɐɾapeˈbu(j)ʃ], [kɐɾapiˈbu(j)ʃ]) is a municipality located in the Brazilian state of Rio de Janeiro. Its population was 16,586 (2020) and its area is 306 km^{2} (118 sq mi).

Carapebus Esporte Clube and Associação Atlética Carapebus are the municipality's football (soccer) clubs.
