= Goytacaz Futebol Clube =

Goytacaz
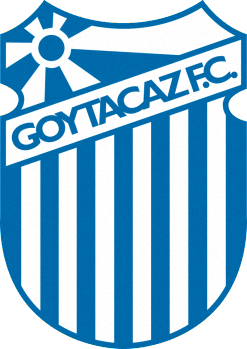
- Full name: Goytacaz Futebol Clube
- Nicknames: Goyta; Alvi-Anil (The Blue & White); Tribo Azul (The Blue Tribe); O Mais Querido da Cidade (The City's Most Cherished)
- Founded: August 20, 1912; 113 years ago
- Ground: Estádio Ary de Oliveira e Souza
- Capacity: 15,000
- President: Dartagnan Fernandes
- Head coach: Cleimar Rocha
| Home colors | Away colors |

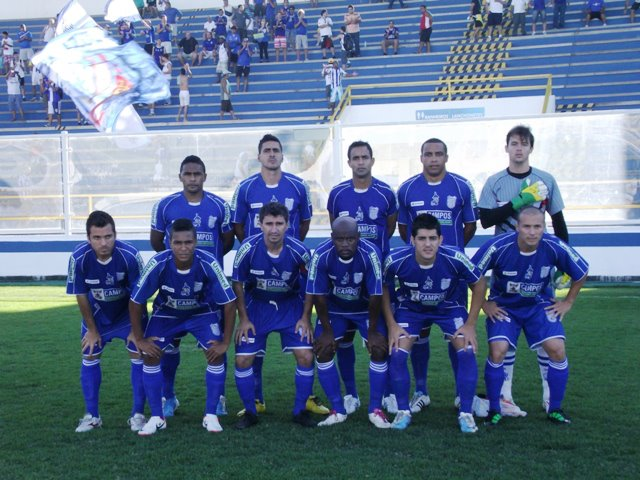
Team photo from the 2012 season

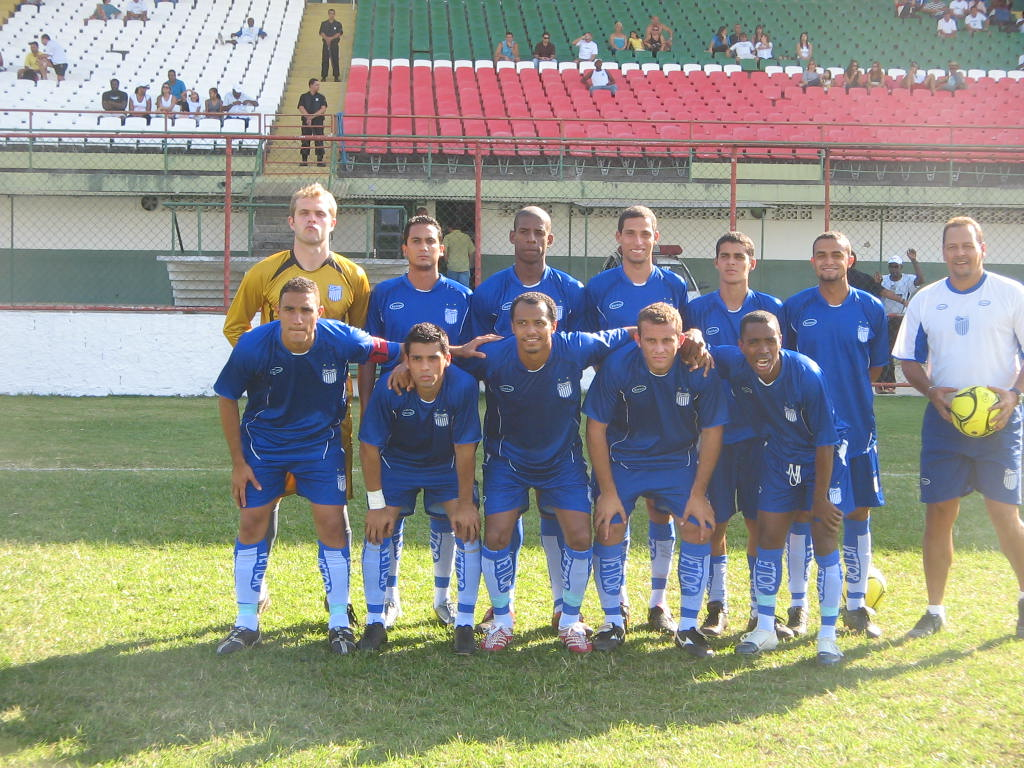
Team photo from the 2007 season

Goytacaz Futebol Clube, or Goytacaz as they are usually called, is a Brazilian football team from Campos dos Goytacazes in Rio de Janeiro, founded on August 20, 1912.

Home stadium is the Ary de Oliveira e Souza stadium, capacity 15,000. They play in blue shirts, white shorts and blue and white striped socks.

== History ==
The club was founded on August 20, 1912, after a misunderstanding of a group of boys from Natação e Regatas Campista club. They felt depreciated because a request to use a boat to travel at Paraíba River was denied by the club. They then abandoned the practice of rowing and founded a football club at Otto Nogueira's house. The first board of directors of Goytacaz was defined as follows:

- Luiz Carlos Cabral (president);
- Roberto Melo (vice president);
- Otto Nogueira (first treasurer);
- Jaime Rego (second treasurer);
- Rudah Martins (first secretary);
- Álvaro Nogueira (second secretary);
- João Cunha (fiscal);
- Manoel Patrão (prosecutor).

It was also decided that Otto Nogueira's house, at 21 de Abril street, number 14, would temporarily serve as the headquarters of the new club.

The first match was on August 25, 1912, against Internacional, where Goytacaz won 2-1, with: Claudinier, Mário Manhães e Catete, Álvaro Nogueira, Estevam Almeida, e Adelino, Laranjeira, Lincoln, Jorge Gomes, Didi e Otto Nogueira. The first field was in front of the Saint Anthony's church; therefore, the saint is considered the team's patron saint. Later, the field was moved to Praça da República, where the city hall ceded a plot of land. Goyta used to play near the Liceu de Humanidades when it moved to opposite the city's railway line, in Rua do Gás, which later became the first field with electric lighting in the interior of Rio de Janeiro state. This caused a great deal of controversy, as the city was experiencing serious energy supply problems.

The Ary de Oliveira e Souza stadium was inaugurated on January 9, 1938, with a 2-1 Goytacaz victory against Internacional, having been one of the founders of the club, Otto Nogueira, that scored the stadium's first goal. The stadium's record attendance was on April 13, 1986, when 14,708 paying spectators were present to watch the game between Goytão and the great Flamengo team, with Zico and company, for the Rio de Janeiro championship. The match ended in a 2-2 draw.

Goytacaz was the first champion of Campos dos Goytacazes, in 1914. The club has won twenty championships, including the 1955 title undefeated, and was also the first club to win four consecutive championships. Goytacaz also won two Cidade de Campos cups and five state championships, formerly known as the Fluminense Championship. In national competitions, the club's best performance in the first division was in 1978, when they finished 30th out of 74 participants. In 1985, they were runners-up in the Taça de Prata, equivalent to the second division.

In 2006, Goytacaz was promoted to the Campeonato Carioca the following year, after finishing fourth in the qualifying round. Subsequently, the courts did not recognize the legal validity of the tournament, preventing the clubs that had earned their spots on the field from gaining access. In 2010, the club was relegated to the third division, returning to the second one the following year. Goytacaz only got promoted to the first division of the Campeonato Carioca in 2017, when conquered the title of the second division after drawing 1-1 with America in the final, being relegated in 2019 on the quadrangular.

In 2020, Goytacaz finished only tenth and would have remained in Série B1 for 2021, but the Rio de Janeiro state football federation restructured the divisions, creating Série A2; as a result, the second division ended up becoming the third, and Goytacaz was relegated. The following year, the club suffered another relegation, with allegations of match-fixing, given that Goytacaz has only won two of nine games.

In 2022, the club finished as runner-up to Barra da Tijuca in Série B2 after losing both final matches 2-0 and 2-1, respectively, in the first and second leg, being promoted to Série B1 in 2023.

In 2024, Goytacaz requested a suspension of its activities, citing fees charged by the Rio de Janeiro state football federation.

== Honours ==
=== Official tournaments ===
State
| Competitions | Titles | Seasons |
|---|---|---|
| Campeonato Fluminense | 5^{s} | 1955, 1963, 1966, 1967, 1978 |
| Campeonato Carioca Série A2 | 2 | 1982, 2017 |
| Campeonato Carioca Série B1 | 1 | 2011 |
| Campeonato Carioca Série B2 | 1^{s} | 2025 |

- record
- ^{s} shared record

=== Others tournaments ===
==== State ====
- Taça Santos Dumont (1): 2017

==== City ====
- Campeonato da Cidade de Campos (20): 1914, 1920, 1926, 1932, 1933, 1940, 1941, 1942, 1943, 1945, 1948, 1951, 1953, 1955, 1957, 1959, 1960, 1963, 1966, 1978
- Torneio Início do Campeonato Campista (11): 1952, 1953, 1954, 1955, 1956, 1959, 1960, 1966, 1968, 1969, 1972
- Taça Cidade de Campos (3): 1970, 1976, 1978

=== Runners-up ===
- Campeonato Brasileiro Série B (1): 1985
- Campeonato Fluminense (8): 1936, 1943, 1945, 1953, 1959, 1960, 1971, 1975
- Campeonato Carioca Série B1 (1): 1994
- Campeonato Carioca Série B2 (1): 2022

== Stadium ==
Goytacaz plays its home matches at Ary de Oliveira e Souza stadium, usually known as Arizão, which has a maximum capacity of 15,000 people.

== Mascot ==
The club's mascot is a Native American of the Goytacazes tribe, first inhabitants of the city, which are also the source of the club's name.

== Rival ==
Goytacaz greatest rival is Americano. The derby is known as Goyta-cano.
