= Barcelona Esporte Clube =

Barcelona E.C.
- Full name: Barcelona Esporte Clube
- Nickname: Barça Carioca
- Founded: December 5, 1999
- Ground: Estádio Barcelona Esporte Clube, Rio de Janeiro, Rio de Janeiro state, Brazil
- Capacity: 5,000
- President: Augusto Vieira
- Head Coach: Osmar Coaracy
- League: Campeonato Carioca Serie C
Home colours	Away colours

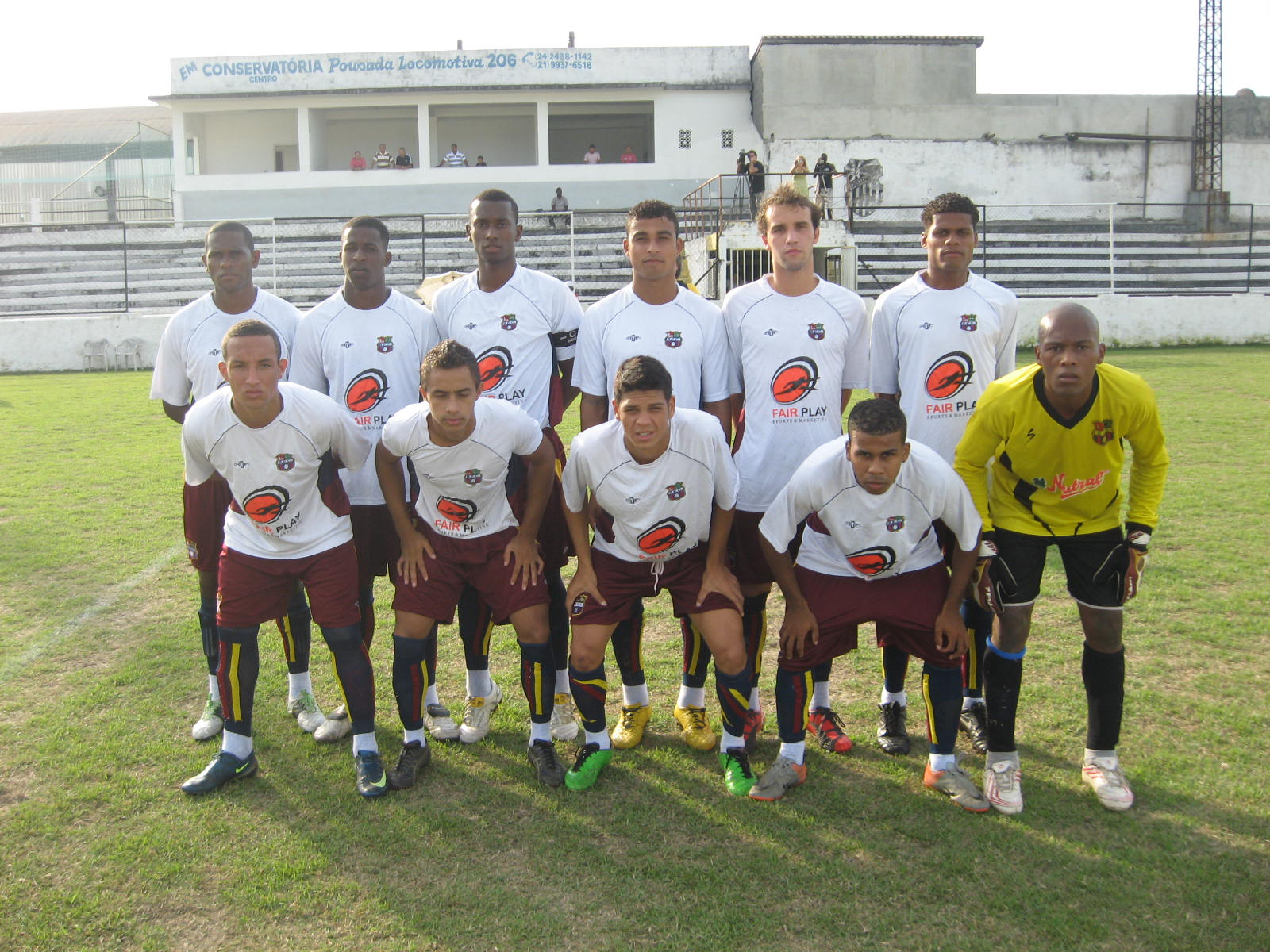
Team photo from the 2011 season

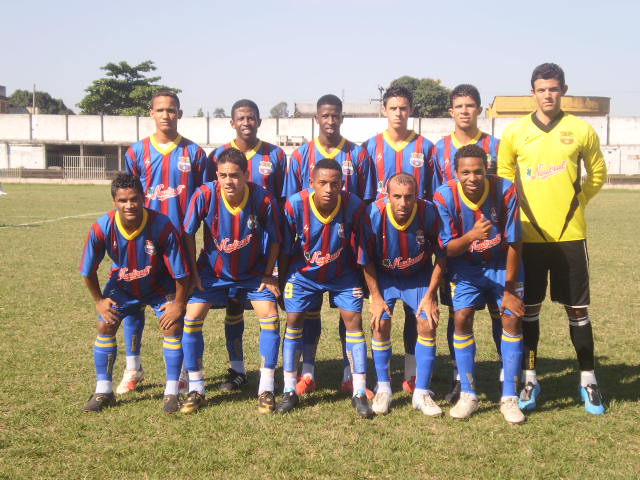
Team photo from the 2009 season

Barcelona Esporte Clube, commonly known as Barcelona, is a Brazilian football club based in Rio de Janeiro, Rio de Janeiro state.

== History ==
The club was founded on December 5, 1999, the club being named after Fútbol Club Barcelona of Spain. They competed in their first professional competition in 2000, in the Campeonato Carioca Fourth Level, finishing in the seventh place, and then they competed in the Campeonato Carioca Second Level in 2001.

== Stadium ==
Barcelona Esporte Clube play their home games at Estádio Barcelona Esporte Clube. The stadium has a maximum capacity of 5,000 people.
