= Angra dos Reis Esporte Clube =

Brazilian football club

Angra dos Reis
- Full name: Angra dos Reis Esporte Clube
- Founded: March 23, 1999
- Ground: Jair Carneiro Toscano de Brito
- Capacity: 5,000
- Chairman: Jorge Eduardo Rabha
- Manager: Carlos Alberto Santos
Home colours	Away colours

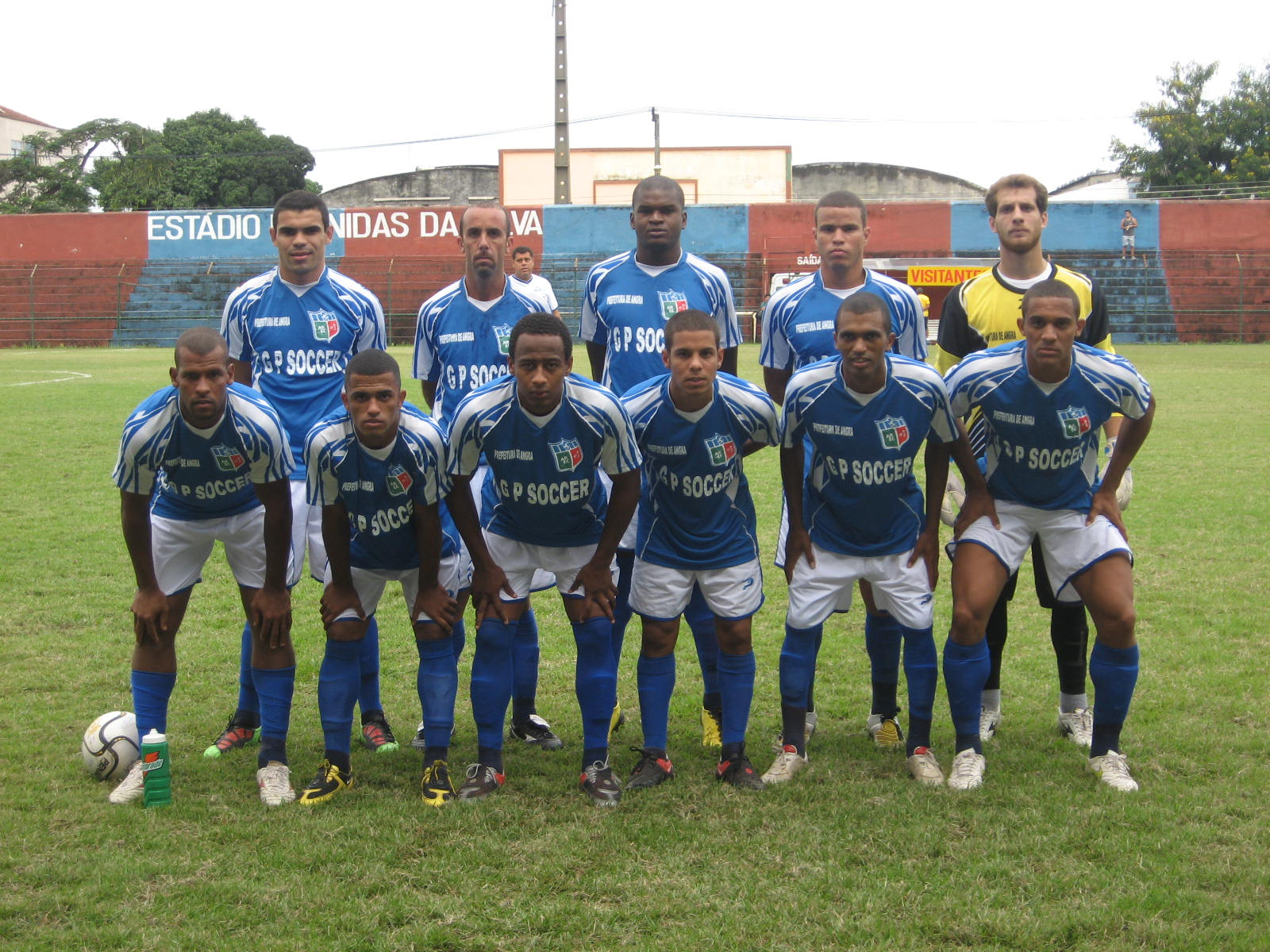
Team photo from the 2011 season

Angra dos Reis Esporte Clube, usually known simply as Angra dos Reis, is a Brazilian football team from the city of Angra dos Reis, Rio de Janeiro state, founded on March 23, 1999.

== Honours ==
- Campeonato Carioca Série B1

Winners (2): 1999, 2017

== Stadium ==
The home stadium Jair Carneiro Toscano de Brito has a capacity of 5,000 people.

== Colors ==
The official color is blue.

== Club kits ==
The home kit is all blue with white collar.
