= Campos dos Goytacazes =

Municipality in Rio de Janeiro State, Brazil

- Municipality
- Municipality of Campos dos Goytacazes
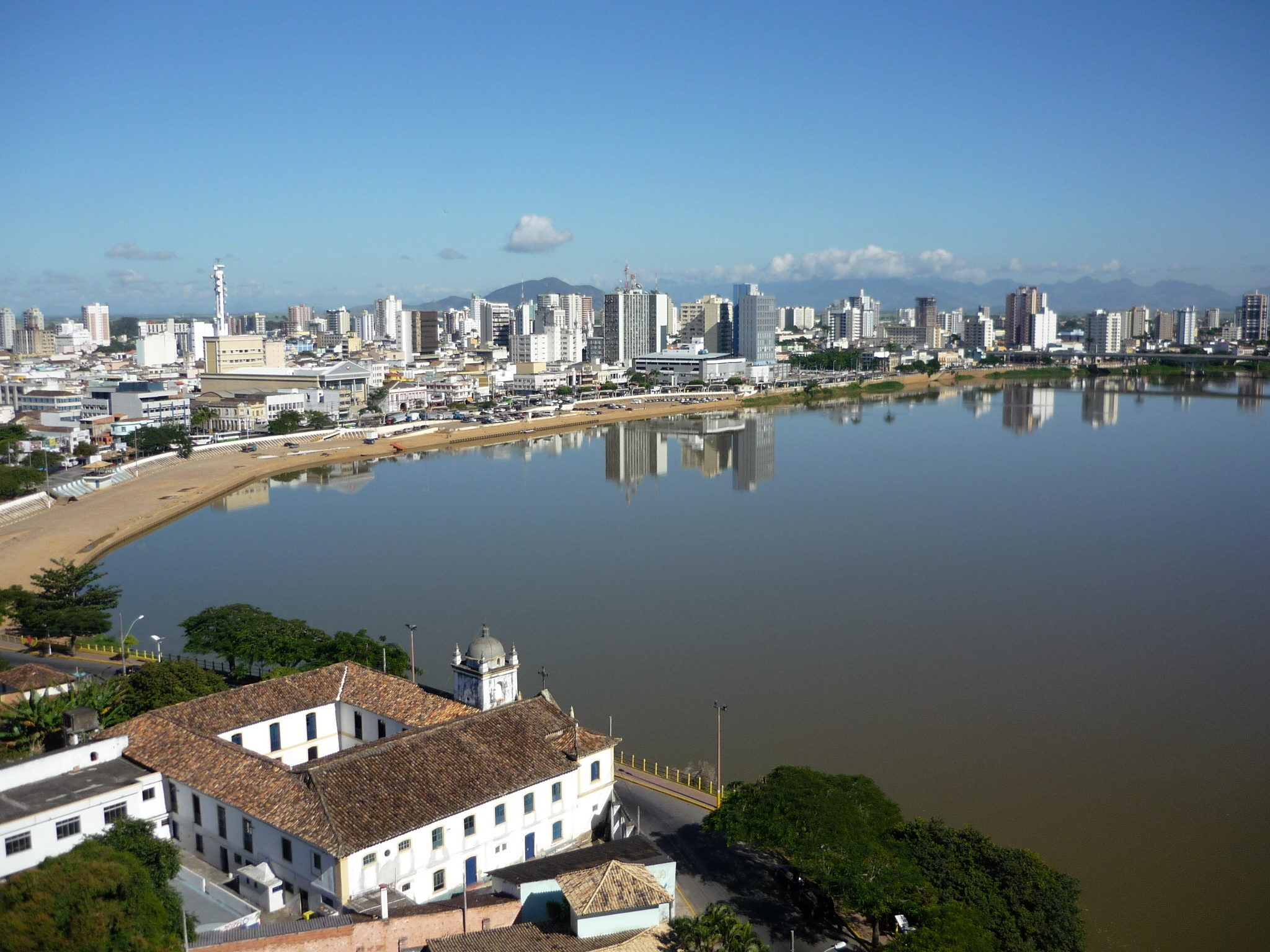
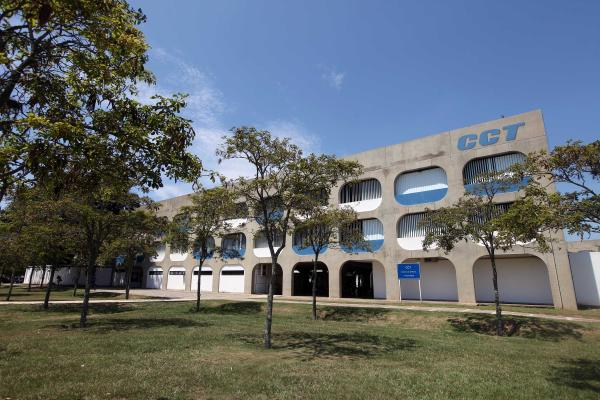
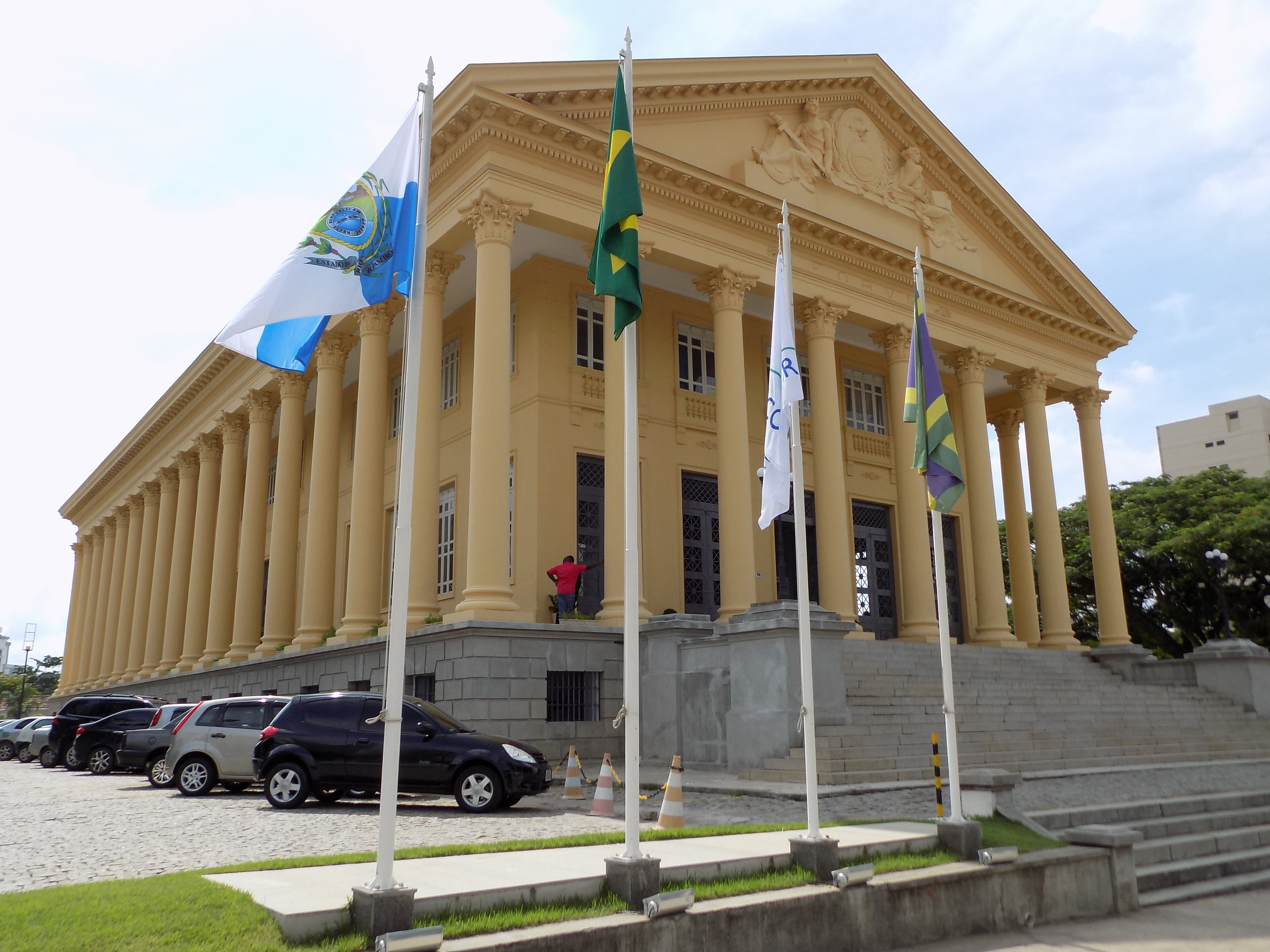
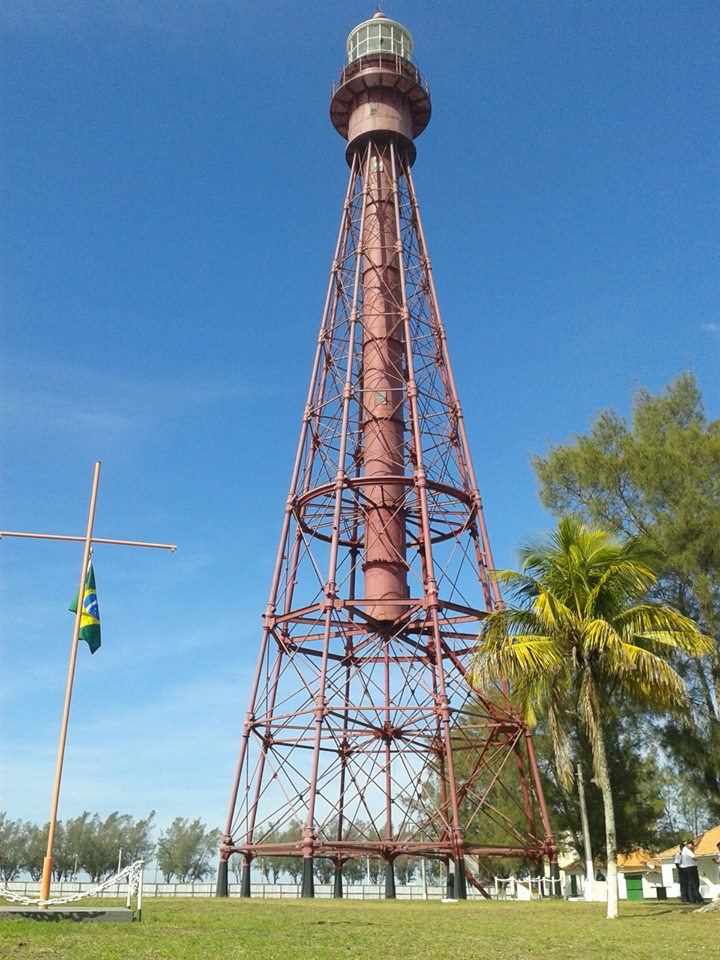
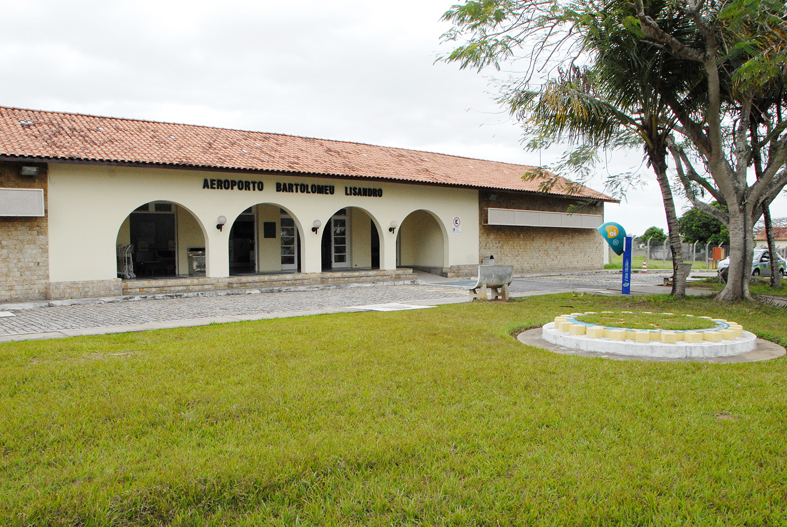
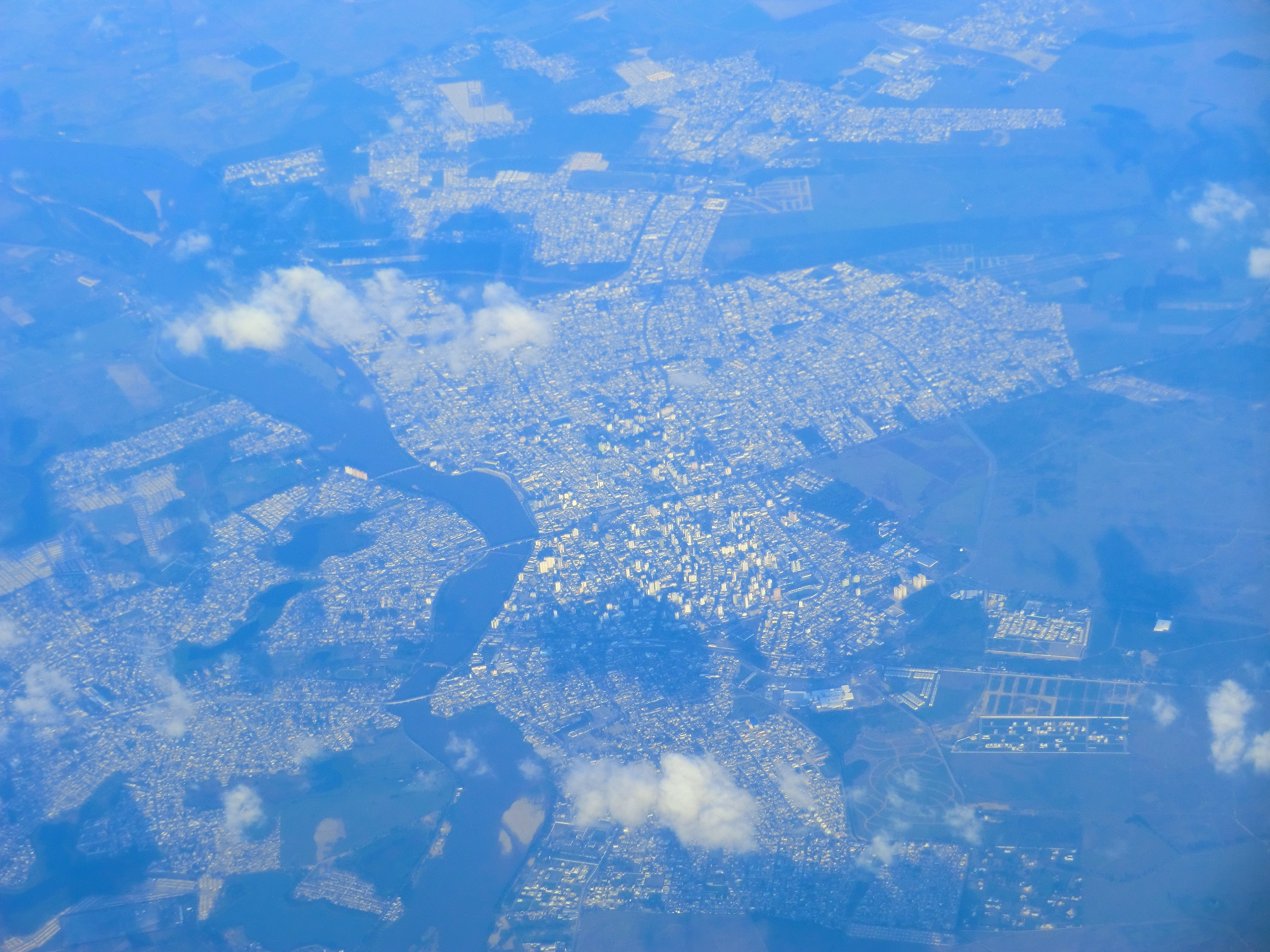

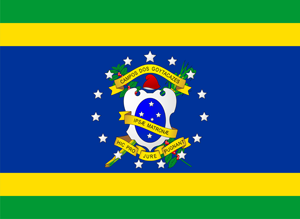
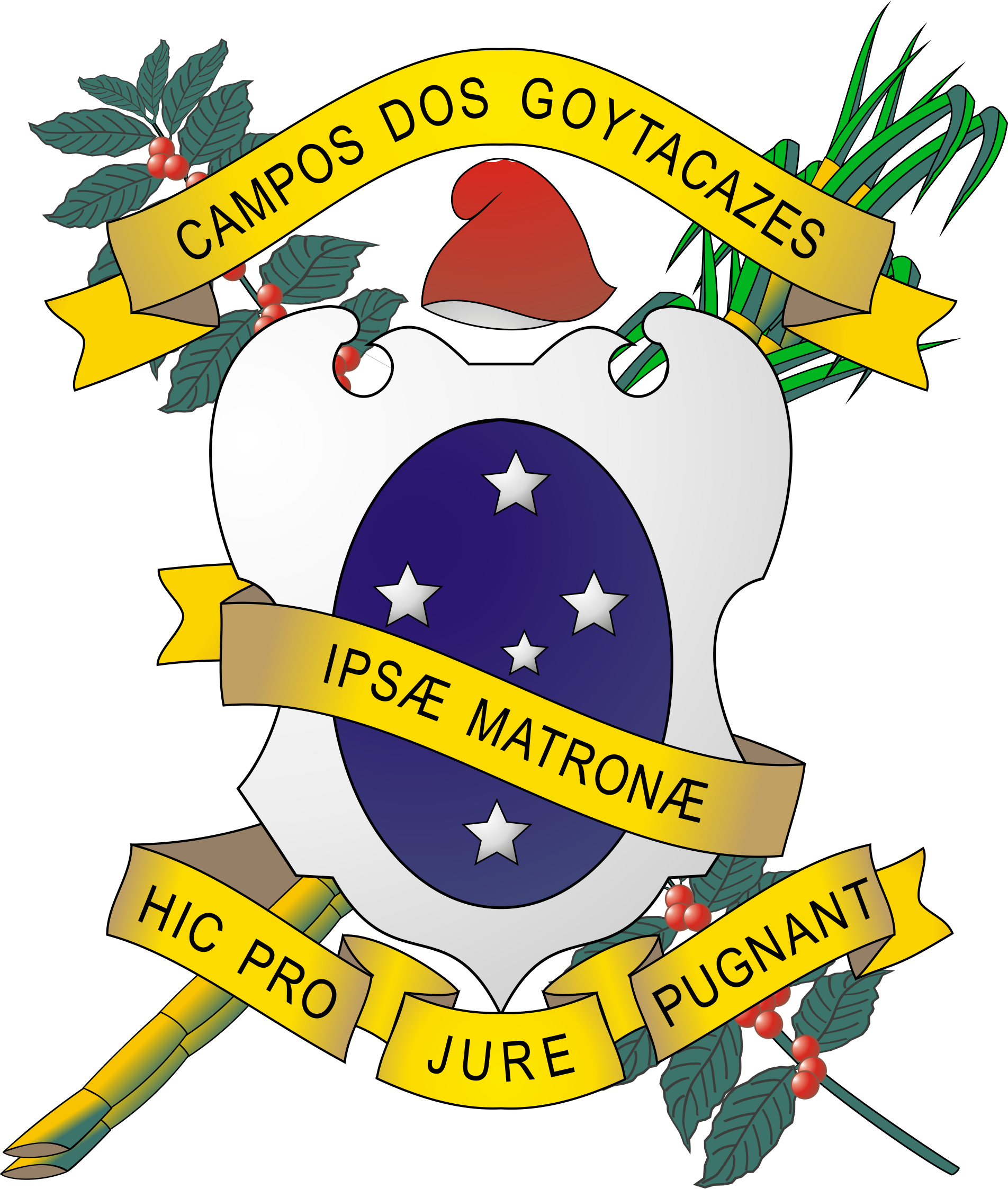
- Flag Coat of arms
- Nickname: "The Capital of Oil and Sugar"
- Motto: Ipsae matronae hic pro jure pugnant (Latin for: "Even women here fight for the right")
- Location in the state of Rio de Janeiro

- Location within Brazil
- Coordinates: 21°45′14″S 41°19′26″W
- Country: Brazil
- Region: Southeast
- State: Rio de Janeiro
- City status: March 28, 1835

Government
  - Mayor: Wladimir Garotinho (UNIÃO)

Area
  - Total: 4,032 km^{2} (1,557 sq mi)
- Elevation: 14 m (46 ft)

Population (2022)
  - Total: 483,540
  - Density: 119.9/km^{2} (310.6/sq mi)
- Time zone: UTC−3 (BRT)
- Postal Code: 28000-000
- Area code: +55 22
- HDI (2010): 0.716 – high
- Website: www.campos.rj.gov.br

Campos dos Goytacazes ([ˈkɐ̃puz duz ɡojtaˈkazis]) is a city located in the northern region of Rio de Janeiro State, Brazil, with a population of 483,540 inhabitants. It is the largest city in Rio de Janeiro (state) outside of the Greater Rio de Janeiro metropolitan area.

== History ==
Colonization of the area started in the 16th century, and the village of São Salvador de Campos de Goytacazes was founded on May 29, 1677. On March 28, 1835, the village was promoted to city status.

The Roman Catholic Diocese of Campos was the see of Bishop Antônio de Castro Mayer, nicknamed "The Lion of Campos", who was one of the bishops who opposed the Vatican II reforms and who teamed with Archbishop Marcel Lefebvre of Dakar to consecrate four independent bishops in Écône, Switzerland, in 1988. Nowadays there are in Campos two Roman Catholic jurisdictions: a Diocese, whose Bishop is Monsignor Roberto Gomes Guimarães and the Personal Apostolic Administration of Saint John Mary Vianney, whose Apostolic Administrator is Monsignor Fernando Areas Rifan.

== Geography ==
=== Location ===
Campos dos Goytacazes has an area of 4,032 km^{2} (1,557 sq mi), which makes it the largest municipality in the state by area, and its elevation is 14 m. Its name comes from the geographical characteristic of the region, very flat with fields (campos in Portuguese) and from the Goytacazes Indians, which inhabited the region. Campos, as the city is usually known, is a macro region of the Northern Fluminense, and is a micro region of Campos dos Goytacazes. The city has a tropical climate.

The municipality contains part of the 21,444-hectare (52,990-acre) Desengano State Park, created in 1970.

The city's distance to Rio de Janeiro city, which is the capital of the state, is 286 kilometres (178 mi). BR-101 is the access highway of the city of Campos. Regular air services are operated from its airport Bartolomeu Lysandro. It is the easternmost municipality in Rio de Janeiro.

=== Climate ===
According to data provided by the National Institute of Meteorology (INMET), the lowest recorded temperature in Campos dos Goytacazes was 9.5 °C (49.1 °F) on 6 July 1942 and the highest was 41.6 °C (106.9 °F) on 31 October 2012. The most accumulated precipitation in the same period was 159.3 millimetres (6.27 in) on 23 December 1955. Records equal or superior to 100 mm (3.9 in) include:

- 149.7 mm (5.89 in) on 2 November 1977,
- 146.6 mm (5.77 in) on 18 November 2008,
- 133.8 mm (5.27 in) on 14 November 2016,
- 117.8 mm (4.64 in) on 20 November 1972,
- 111.4 mm (4.39 in) on 24 November 1966,
- 108.6 mm (4.28 in) on 6 March 1960,
- 107.8 mm (4.24 in) on 27 November 1992,
- 107.3 mm (4.22 in) on 11 November 1970,
- 105.4 mm (4.15 in) on 12 December 2005,
- 103.3 mm (4.07 in) on 23 February 1933,
- 102.8 mm (4.05 in) on 28 November 2008 and
- 102 mm (4.0 in) on 28 March 1966.

Climate data for Campos dos Goytacazes (1991–2020 normals, extremes 1931–present)
Month	Jan	Feb	Mar	Apr	May	Jun	Jul	Aug	Sep	Oct	Nov	Dec	Year
Record high °C (°F)	40.2 (104.4)	40.8 (105.4)	39.4 (102.9)	39.2 (102.6)	36.4 (97.5)	35.2 (95.4)	36.6 (97.9)	38.0 (100.4)	39.0 (102.2)	41.6 (106.9)	40.3 (104.5)	40.8 (105.4)	41.6 (106.9)
Mean daily maximum °C (°F)	32.3 (90.1)	33.4 (92.1)	32.6 (90.7)	31.0 (87.8)	28.7 (83.7)	28.0 (82.4)	27.5 (81.5)	27.9 (82.2)	28.2 (82.8)	29.2 (84.6)	29.7 (85.5)	31.6 (88.9)	30.0 (86.0)
Daily mean °C (°F)	26.9 (80.4)	27.5 (81.5)	26.9 (80.4)	25.6 (78.1)	23.3 (73.9)	22.2 (72.0)	21.7 (71.1)	22.1 (71.8)	23.0 (73.4)	24.2 (75.6)	24.9 (76.8)	26.3 (79.3)	24.6 (76.3)
Mean daily minimum °C (°F)	23.4 (74.1)	23.8 (74.8)	23.5 (74.3)	22.1 (71.8)	19.7 (67.5)	18.4 (65.1)	17.9 (64.2)	18.2 (64.8)	19.4 (66.9)	20.8 (69.4)	21.7 (71.1)	23.0 (73.4)	21.0 (69.8)
Record low °C (°F)	17.0 (62.6)	15.3 (59.5)	16.8 (62.2)	10.7 (51.3)	10.8 (51.4)	10.4 (50.7)	9.5 (49.1)	10.3 (50.5)	10.7 (51.3)	11.5 (52.7)	13.6 (56.5)	16.0 (60.8)	9.5 (49.1)
Average precipitation mm (inches)	127.7 (5.03)	64.4 (2.54)	120.4 (4.74)	66.6 (2.62)	62.6 (2.46)	31.1 (1.22)	34.9 (1.37)	29.6 (1.17)	57.5 (2.26)	78.7 (3.10)	159.9 (6.30)	148.2 (5.83)	981.6 (38.65)
Average precipitation days (≥ 1.0 mm)	8	6	9	7	6	4	5	4	6	8	11	11	85
Average relative humidity (%)	77.4	74.9	77.2	77.9	77.9	78.3	78	75.4	76.8	76.8	78.5	78.5	77.3
Mean monthly sunshine hours	205.1	207.2	185.1	184.6	184.3	174.2	191.7	181.4	128.5	133.4	145.1	157.6	2,078.2
Source: Instituto Nacional de Meteorologia (sun and humidity 1981–2010)

== Economy ==
City's economy is based on oil extraction. The GDP for the city was R$17,283,381. (2016).

The per capita income for the city was R$35,475. (2016).

== Crime ==
Campos dos Goytacazes recorded 233 homicides in 2018 for a murder rate of 46 homicides per 100,000 people for the year. This makes Campos dos Goytacazes the most violent city in the southern half of Brazil.

== Education ==
=== Educational institutions ===
- Universidade Estadual do Norte Fluminense;
- Universidade Cândido Mendes;
- Universidade Federal Rural do Rio de Janeiro;
- Faculdade de Medicina de Campos;
- Faculdade de Direito de Campos;
- Faculdade de Odontologia Campos;
- IF Fluminense (former CEFET Campos);
- Universidade Federal Fluminense;
- Universidade Salgado de Oliveira;
- Universidade Estácio de Sá;
- Faculdade Batista Fluminense;
- Ise-Censa;
- Unigranrio;

== Demographics ==
Population Growth of Campos dos Goytacazes
Year	Pop.	±%
1950	701,342	—
1960	630,054	−10.2%
1970	609,248	−3.3%
1980	564,329	−7.4%
1990	517,300	−8.3%
2000	436,008	−15.7%
2010	471,737	+8.2%
2022	483,540	+2.5%

As of 2010, the population of Campos is 471,737, up from the 436,008 in 2000, but down from the 1990s, 1980s, 1970s, 1960s and 1950s. The city in the 1950s was the second largest of the state of Rio de Janeiro. The reasons behind these reductions are the "crash" that the economy of the town, based on oil, suffered in 1954, something similar that happened in Detroit with the auto industries. According to the 2010 census of IBGE (Brazilian Institute of Geography and Statistics), whites represent 47.6% of population, brown or mulatos 36.8% and black of African 14.6%. Other races represent 1.0% of the population.

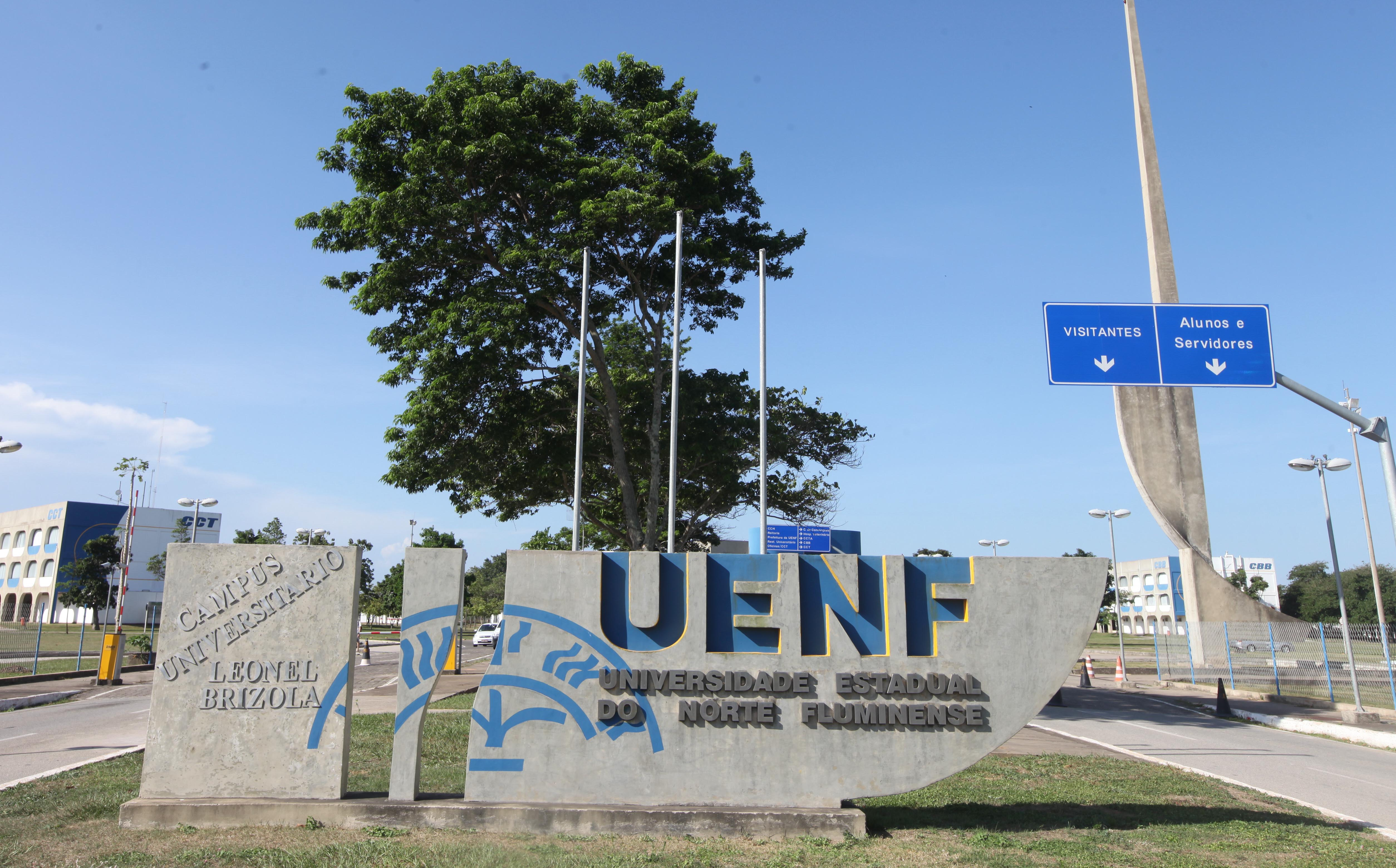
The State University of Northern Rio de Janeiro Entrance

== Sports ==
There are at least four football clubs in the city, namely Americano, Campos, Goytacaz and Rio Branco. The derby between Americano and Goytacaz is known as Goyta-cano.
