= 2016 Campeonato Carioca =

Campeonato Carioca
- Season: 2016
- Dates: January 30 – May 3, 2016
- Champions: Vasco da Gama
- Relegated: America; Friburguense
- Copa do Brasil: Boavista; Fluminense; Vasco da Gama; Volta Redonda
- Série D: Boavista; Volta Redonda

The 2016 Campeonato Carioca was the 113th edition of the top tier of the Campeonato Carioca, organized by FFERJ. The top four teams not otherwise qualified through national and international tournaments qualified for the 2017 Copa do Brasil. The top two teams not otherwise playing in the Campeonato Brasileiro Série A, Série B or Série C qualified for the 2016 Campeonato Brasileiro Série D.

Unlike the previous edition, the 16 teams in the 2016 Campeonato Carioca were divided into two groups of 8, whereby each team played every team from the other group once. The top four teams from each group qualified for the Taça Guanabara, while the bottom four teams qualified for the Taça Rio group stage. The Taça Rio group stage was made up of 8 teams and was contested as a single round-robin, with the top two teams going to the Taça Rio semifinals and the bottom two teams relegated to the 2017 Campeonato Carioca Série B1. The Taça Guanabara consisted of another group of 8 teams which was contested as a single round-robin. The top four teams from the Taça Guanabara qualified for the Campeonato Carioca semifinals, and the 5th and 6th placed teams qualified for the Taça Rio semifinals. The Taça Rio semifinals and final were single-legged; the Campeonato Carioca semifinal was single-legged, while the final was two-legged. Preparations for the 2016 Summer Olympics made Maracanã Stadium and Engenhão Stadium unavailable except for the finals. Matches were moved to alternative locations, including out of Rio de Janeiro state.

== Participating teams ==
Location of teams in the 2016 Campeonato Carioca
Location of teams in the 2016 Campeonato Carioca – city of Rio de Janeiro

Club	Home city	Manager	2015 Result
America Football Club	Mesquita	Ricardo Cruz and Clóvis de Oliveira	1st (Série B)
Bangu Atlético Clube	Rio de Janeiro (Bangu)	Emanoel Sacramento and Mário Marques	8th
Boavista Sport Club	Saquarema	Rodrigo Beckham	14th
Bonsucesso Futebol Clube	Rio de Janeiro (Bangu) (Note: Although Bonsucesso FC is headquartered in Bonsucesso, it played most home games at Moça Bonita Stadium)	Mário Marques and Toninho Andrade	12th
Botafogo de Futebol e Regatas	Rio de Janeiro (Vasco da Gama) (Note: Although Botafogo FR is headquartered in Botafogo and normally plays home games at Engenhão Stadium, for the 2016 Campeonato Carioca it played most home games at São Januário Stadium)	Ricardo Gomes	2nd
Associação Desportiva Cabofriense	Cabo Frio	Eduardo Hungaro	11th
Clube de Regatas do Flamengo	Volta Redonda (Note: Although CR Flamengo is headquartered in Lagoa and normally plays home games at Maracanã Stadium, for the 2016 Campeonato Carioca it played most home games at Cidadania Stadium)	Muricy Ramalho	3rd
Fluminense Football Club	Volta Redonda (Note: Although Fluminense FC is headquartered in Laranjeiras and normally plays home games at Maracanã Stadium, for the 2016 Campeonato Carioca it played most home games at Cidadania Stadium)	Eduardo Baptista, Marcão and Levir Culpi	4th
Friburguense Atlético Clube	Nova Friburgo	Gérson Andreotti	10th
Macaé Esporte Futebol Clube	Macaé	Toninho Andrade and Tita	6th
Madureira Esporte Clube	Rio de Janeiro (Madureira)	Alfredo Sampaio and Gilberto de Souza Coroa	5th
Associação Atlética Portuguesa	Rio de Janeiro (Governador Island)	Gaúcho, Didinho and Marcelo Salles	2nd (Série B)
Resende Futebol Clube	Resende	Aílton Ferraz and Marcelo Cabo	9th
Esporte Clube Tigres do Brasil	Duque de Caxias	Marcelo Cabo and Cássio Barros	13th
Club de Regatas Vasco da Gama	Rio de Janeiro (Vasco da Gama)	Jorginho	1st
Volta Redonda Futebol Clube	Volta Redonda	Felipe Surian	7th

== League tables ==
The sixteen sides were split into two groups of eight, with the top four from both groups advancing to the Taça Guanabara and the bottom four from both groups advancing to the Taça Rio.

=== Group A ===
Pos	Team	Pld	W	D	L	GF	GA	GD	Pts	Qualification
1	Vasco da Gama	8	6	2	0	18	6	+12	20	Taça Guanabara
2	Boavista	8	4	3	1	13	7	+6	15	Taça Guanabara
3	Fluminense	8	4	1	3	16	11	+5	13	Taça Guanabara
4	Bangu	8	3	2	3	13	11	+2	11	Taça Guanabara
5	Cabofriense	8	2	1	5	9	12	−3	7	Taça Rio
6	Portuguesa	8	2	1	5	11	17	−6	7	Taça Rio
7	Resende	8	1	4	3	5	11	−6	7	Taça Rio
8	Macaé	8	1	1	6	5	12	−7	4	Taça Rio

Updated to match(es) played on 3 March 2016. Source:
Rules for classification: 1) points; 2) goal difference; 3) number of goals scored.

=== Group B ===
Pos	Team	Pld	W	D	L	GF	GA	GD	Pts	Qualification
1	Botafogo	8	7	1	0	12	3	+9	22	Taça Guanabara
2	Flamengo	8	6	1	1	19	4	+15	19	Taça Guanabara
3	Volta Redonda	8	3	4	1	13	10	+3	13	Taça Guanabara
4	Madureira	8	3	3	2	12	12	0	12	Taça Guanabara
5	America	8	3	2	3	9	9	0	11	Taça Rio
6	Friburguense	8	3	2	3	10	13	−3	11	Taça Rio
7	Tigres do Brasil	8	1	1	6	6	17	−11	4	Taça Rio
8	Bonsucesso	8	0	1	7	6	22	−16	1	Taça Rio

Updated to match(es) played on 3 March 2016. Source:
Rules for classification: 1) points; 2) goal difference; 3) number of goals scored.

== Taça Guanabara ==
Pos	Team	Pld	W	D	L	GF	GA	GD	Pts	Qualification
1	Vasco da Gama	7	5	2	0	8	2	+6	17	Taça GB champions and Semifinals
2	Fluminense	7	4	2	1	10	3	+7	14	Advanced in Semifinals
3	Botafogo	7	4	2	1	8	4	+4	14	Advanced in Semifinals
4	Flamengo	7	3	3	1	10	4	+6	12	Advanced in Semifinals
5	Volta Redonda	7	2	2	3	6	8	−2	8	Taça Rio
6	Boavista	7	2	0	5	3	10	−7	6	Taça Rio
7	Bangu	7	1	1	5	5	13	−8	4	
8	Madureira	7	0	2	5	4	10	−6	2	

Rules for classification: 1) points; 2) goal difference; 3) number of goals scored.

== Taça Rio ==
Pos	Team	Pld	W	D	L	GF	GA	GD	Pts	Qualification or relegation
1	Resende	7	5	0	2	12	8	+4	15	Advanced in Semifinals
2	Macaé	7	4	1	2	11	7	+4	13	Advanced in Semifinals
3	Tigres do Brasil	7	3	2	2	9	8	+1	11	
4	Portuguesa	7	3	2	2	7	6	+1	11	
5	Cabofriense	7	3	1	3	6	5	+1	10	
6	Bonsucesso	7	2	2	3	10	9	+1	8	
7	Friburguense	7	2	0	5	6	12	−6	6	Relegation to Série B1
8	America	7	1	2	4	5	11	−6	5	Relegation to Série B1

Rules for classification: 1) points; 2) goal difference; 3) number of goals scored.

=== Taça Rio - Final Stage ===
Semifinals
Volta Redonda	2
Resende	1
Boavista	1
Macaé	4

Finals
Volta Redonda	3
Macaé	0

=== Semi-finals ===
23 April 2016
15:30

Volta Redonda	2 - 1	Macaé
Bruno Barra 40'; Luan 60'	Report	33' Jones Leandro

Moça Bonita, Rio de Janeiro
Referee: Lenílton Rodrigues Gomes Júnior
24 April 2016
16:00

Boavista	1 - 4	Resende
Reinaldo 43'	Report	11' Marcel; 24' Jhulliam; 57' Muriel; 92' Borja

São Januário, Rio de Janeiro
Referee: Philip Bennett

=== Final ===
1 May 2016
16:00

Volta Redonda	3 - 0	Resende
Dija Baiano 62'; Bruno Barra 91'; Tiago Amaral 93'	Report

São Januário, Rio de Janeiro
Referee: João Batista de Arruda

== Final Stage ==
Semi-finals
Vasco da Gama	2
Flamengo	0
Fluminense	0
Botafogo	1

Finals
Vasco da Gama	1	1	2
Botafogo	0	1	1

=== Semi-finals ===
24 April 2016
18:30

Vasco da Gama	2 - 0	Flamengo
Andrezinho 22'; Wallace 57' (o.g.)	Report

Arena da Amazônia, Manaus
Referee: Leonardo Garcia Cavaleiro
24 April 2016
19:00

Fluminense	0 - 1	Botafogo
	Report	17' Ribamar

Raulino de Oliveira, Volta Redonda
Referee: Rodrigo Carvalhaes de Miranda

=== Finals ===
1 May 2016
16:00

Botafogo	0 - 1	Vasco da Gama
	Report	60' Jorge Henrique

Maracanã, Rio de Janeiro
Attendance: 37.207
Referee: Wagner do Nascimento Magalhães
8 May 2016
16:00

Vasco da Gama	1 - 1	Botafogo
Rafael Vaz 56'	Report	49' Leandrinho

Maracanã, Rio de Janeiro
Attendance: 53.634
Referee: Leonardo Garcia Cavaleiro

== Awards ==
=== Team of the year ===
Pos.	Player	Club
GK	(Uruguay) Martín Silva	Vasco da Gama
DF	(Brazil) Rodinei	Flamengo
DF	(Brazil) Rodrigo	Vasco da Gama
DF	(Brazil) Luan	Vasco da Gama
DF	(Brazil) Diogo Barbosa	Botafogo
MF	(Brazil) Andrezinho	Vasco da Gama
MF	(Brazil) Willian Arão	Flamengo
MF	(Brazil) Gustavo Scarpa	Fluminense
MF	(Brazil) Nenê	Vasco da Gama
FW	(Brazil) Ribamar	Botafogo
FW	(Colombia) Riascos	Vasco da Gama

Source Globo Esporte
Last updated: 14 May 2016

Player of the Season

The Player of the Year was awarded to Nenê.

Young Player of the Season

The Young Player of the Year was awarded to Ribamar.
