= 2012 Campeonato Carioca =

Campeonato Carioca
- Champions: Fluminense
- Relegated: Americano; Bonsucesso
- Copa do Brasil: Botafogo; Flamengo; Resende; Volta Redonda
- Série D: Volta Redonda
- Matches: 134
- Goals: 385 (2.87 per match)
- Best Player: Deco
- Top goalscorer: Somália; Alecsandro (12)
- Biggest home win: Botafogo 5–0 Olaria
- Biggest away win: Volta Redonda 0–3 Fluminense; Macaé 0–3 Botafogo; Macaé 1–4 Vasco da Gama; Resende 0–3 Bangu; Duque de Caxias 1–4 Madureira
- Highest scoring: Friburguense 5–2 Boavista (7 Goals)
- Longest winning run: 8 games Vasco
- Longest unbeaten run: 18 games Botafogo
- Longest losing run: 7 games Bangu

The 2012 Campeonato Carioca was the 111th edition of the Campeonato Carioca, organized by the Federação de Futebol do Estado do Rio de Janeiro (Rio de Janeiro State Football Federation or FERJ). Fluminense won the title against Botafogo.

== Format ==
The sixteen clubs were divided into two groups that would play in two phases. In the first phase, the Taça Guanabara, the teams from each group played within their group in a single round-robin. The two top teams from each group advanced to the Taça Guanabara playoffs and the next two best teams played for the Troféu Edilson Silva. In the second phase, the Taça Rio, each team played against the teams in the other group. The two best teams from each group then advanced to the Taça Rio playoffs, while the next two best teams played for the Troféu Luiz Penido. The winners of the Taça Guanabara and the Taça Rio played each other to determine the winner of the Campeonato Carioca. If the same team had won both the Taça Guanabara and the Taça Rio, they would automatically have been awarded the Campeonato Carioca title.

== Qualifications ==
The four best teams not already qualified to the 2013 Copa Libertadores qualified for the 2013 Copa do Brasil. The best team not playing in the Campeonato Brasileiro Série A, Série B or Série C qualified for 2012 Campeonato Brasileiro Série D.

== Participating teams ==
Location of teams in the 2012 Campeonato Carioca
Location of teams in the 2012 Campeonato Carioca – city of Rio de Janeiro

Club	Home city	Manager	2011 Result
Americano Futebol Clube	Campos dos Goytacazes	Moacir Júnior, Luís Antônio Zaluar, Acácio and André Pimpolho	8th
Bangu Atlético Clube	Rio de Janeiro (Bangu)	Marcão, Carlos César and Cleimar Rocha	13th
Boavista Sport Club	Saquarema	Alfredo Sampaio and Andrade	4th
Bonsucesso Futebol Clube	Mesquita (Note: Although Bonsucesso FC is headquartered in Bonsucesso, it played most home games at Giulite Coutinho Stadium)	Wilson Gottardo and Marcão	1st (Série B)
Botafogo de Futebol e Regatas	Rio de Janeiro (Engenho de Dentro) (Note: Although Botafogo FR is headquartered in Botafogo, it plays home games at Engenhão Stadium)	Oswaldo de Oliveira	3rd
Duque de Caxias Futebol Clube	Duque de Caxias	Mário Marques and Eduardo Allax	10th
Clube de Regatas do Flamengo	Rio de Janeiro (Engenho de Dentro) (Note: Although CR Flamengo is headquartered in Lagoa and normally plays home games at Maracanã Stadium, for the 2012 Campeonato Carioca it played most home games at Engenhão Stadium)	Júnior Lopes, Jayme de Almeida and Joel Santana	1st
Fluminense Football Club	Volta Redonda (Note: Although Fluminense FC is headquartered in Laranjeiras and normally plays home games at Maracanã Stadium, for the 2012 Campeonato Carioca it played most home games at Raulino de Oliveira Stadium)	Abel Braga	2nd
Friburguense Atlético Clube	Nova Friburgo	Gérson Andreotti	2nd (Série B)
Macaé Esporte Futebol Clube	Macaé	Toninho Andrade	14th
Madureira Esporte Clube	Rio de Janeiro (Madureira)	Luiz Cláudio and Gabriel Vieira	11th
Nova Iguaçu Futebol Clube	Nova Iguaçu	Léo Condé	9th
Olaria Atlético Clube	Rio de Janeiro (Olaria)	Acácio and Amilton Oliveira	5th
Resende Futebol Clube	Resende	Paulo Campos	7th
Club de Regatas Vasco da Gama	Rio de Janeiro (Vasco da Gama)	Cristóvão Borges	6th
Volta Redonda Futebol Clube	Volta Redonda	Ricardo Drubscky and Élson Roberto Raymundo	12th

== Taça Guanabara ==
The 2012 Taça Guanabara began on January 21 and ended on February 26.

=== Group stage ===
Group A
Pos	Team	Pld	W	D	L	GF	GA	GD	Pts	Qualification or relegation
1	Botafogo	7	4	3	0	17	4	+13	15	Advanced to the Semifinals
2	Flamengo	7	4	3	0	10	1	+9	15	Advanced to the Semifinals
3	Resende	7	4	0	3	11	13	−2	12	Advanced to the Troféu Edilson Silva
4	Nova Iguaçu	7	2	3	2	6	7	−1	9	Advanced to the Troféu Edilson Silva
5	Macaé	7	2	2	3	6	8	−2	8	
6	Bonsucesso	7	1	3	3	7	13	−6	6	
7	Madureira	7	1	2	4	8	12	−4	5	
8	Olaria	7	1	2	4	5	12	−7	5	

Updated to match(es) played on 18 February 2012. Source:
Rules for classification: 1 points; 2 wins; 3 goal difference; 4 goals scored; 5 red cards received; 6 yellow cards received; 7 draw

Group B
Pos	Team	Pld	W	D	L	GF	GA	GD	Pts	Qualification or relegation
1	Vasco da Gama	7	7	0	0	16	3	+13	21	Advanced to the Semifinals
2	Fluminense	7	4	1	2	15	7	+8	13	Advanced to the Semifinals
3	Boavista	7	3	2	2	13	12	+1	11	Advanced to the Troféu Edilson Silva
4	Friburguense	7	3	2	2	10	10	0	11	Advanced to the Troféu Edilson Silva
5	Volta Redonda	7	3	2	2	10	11	−1	11	
6	Duque de Caxias	7	2	2	3	9	12	−3	8	
7	Americano	7	1	1	5	6	13	−7	4	
8	Bangu	7	0	0	7	7	18	−11	0	

Updated to match(es) played on 18 February 2012. Source:
Rules for classification: 1 points; 2 wins; 3 goal difference; 4 goals scored; 5 red cards received; 6 yellow cards received; 7 draw

=== Troféu Edilson Silva ===
Semifinals
Resende	0
Friburguense	1
Boavista	1
Nova Iguaçu	3

Final
Friburguense	2 (2)
Nova Iguaçu (pen.)	2 (4)

==== Semifinals ====
23 February 2012
17:00 UTC−02:00

Resende	0 – 1	Friburguense
	Report	Marquinhos Galhardo 57'

Giulite Coutinho Stadium, Mesquita
Attendance: 276
Referee: Rodrigo Saraiva Castanheira
23 February 2012
19:30 UTC−02:00

Boavista	1 – 3	Nova Iguaçu
Ernani 27'	Report	Leandrão 23'; Dirceu 48'; Bruno Costa 79' (o.g.)

Giulite Coutinho Stadium, Mesquita
Attendance: 276
Referee: Antonio Frederico Maciel dos Santos

==== Final ====
26 February 2012
13:20 UTC−03:00

Friburguense	2 – 2	Nova Iguaçu
Diego Guerra 64'; Marcelo 84'	Report	Jones Leandro 12'; Zambi 71'
Penalties
	2 – 4

Engenhão Stadium, Rio de Janeiro
Attendance: 0
Referee: Leonardo de Castro Moreira

=== Taça Guanabara knockout stage ===
Semifinals
Vasco da Gama	2
Flamengo	1
Botafogo	1 (3)
Fluminense (pen.)	1 (4)

Final
Vasco da Gama	1
Fluminense	3

==== Semifinals ====
22 February 2012
22:00 UTC−02:00

Vasco da Gama	2 – 1	Flamengo
Alecsandro 14'; Diego Souza 77'	Report	Vágner Love 2'

Engenhão Stadium, Rio de Janeiro
Attendance: 21492
Referee: Luis Antonio Silva dos Santos
23 February 2012
21:00 UTC−02:00

Botafogo	1 – 1	Fluminense
Elkeson 74'	Report	Leandro Euzébio 80'
Penalties
	3 – 4

Engenhão Stadium, Rio de Janeiro
Attendance: 21143
Referee: Pericles Bassols Pegado Cortez

==== Final ====
26 February 2012
16:00 UTC−03:00

Vasco da Gama	1 – 3	Fluminense
Eduardo Costa 83'	Report	Fred 36', 56'; Deco 42'

Engenhão Stadium, Rio de Janeiro
Attendance: 36374
Referee: Marcelo de Lima Henrique

== Taça Rio ==
=== Group stage ===
Group A
Pos	Team	Pld	W	D	L	GF	GA	GD	Pts	Qualification or relegation
1	Flamengo	8	7	0	1	17	8	+9	21	Advanced to the Semifinals
2	Botafogo	8	5	3	0	18	8	+10	18	Advanced to the Semifinals
3	Resende	8	3	4	1	9	8	+1	13	Advanced to the Troféu Luiz Penido
4	Macaé	8	4	0	4	13	14	−1	12	Advanced to the Troféu Luiz Penido
5	Madureira	8	3	1	4	11	13	−2	10	
6	Olaria	8	2	3	3	8	12	−4	9	
7	Nova Iguaçu	8	2	2	4	8	13	−5	8	
8	Bonsucesso	8	1	4	3	10	13	−3	7	

Updated to match(es) played on 15 April. Source:
Rules for classification: 1 points; 2 wins; 3 goal difference; 4 goals scored; 5 red cards received; 6 yellow cards received; 7 draw

Group B
Pos	Team	Pld	W	D	L	GF	GA	GD	Pts	Qualification or relegation
1	Bangu	8	4	3	1	10	5	+5	15	Advanced to the Semifinals
2	Vasco da Gama	8	4	2	2	17	10	+7	14	Advanced to the Semifinals
3	Fluminense	8	4	1	3	15	10	+5	13	Advanced to the Troféu Luiz Penido
4	Volta Redonda	8	3	2	3	10	11	−1	11	Advanced to the Troféu Luiz Penido
5	Duque de Caxias	8	2	2	4	7	12	−5	8	
6	Friburguense	8	1	3	4	6	11	−5	6	
7	Americano	8	1	2	5	13	18	−5	5	
8	Boavista	8	1	2	5	11	17	−6	5	

Updated to match(es) played on 15 April. Source:
Rules for classification: 1 points; 2 wins; 3 goal difference; 4 goals scored; 5 red cards received; 6 yellow cards received; 7 draw

=== Troféu Luiz Penido ===
Semifinals
Resende	0
Volta Redonda	2
Fluminense	2
Macaé	1

Final
Volta Redonda	0
Fluminense	2

==== Semifinals ====
20 April 2012
15:30 UTC−03:00

Resende	0 – 2	Volta Redonda
	Report	Vinicius 72'; Jhonnattann 75'

Moça Bonita Stadium, Rio de Janeiro
Attendance: 112
Referee: Rodrigo Carvalhães de Miranda
21 April 2012
15:30 UTC−03:00

Fluminense	2 – 1	Macaé
Manuel Lanzini 43'; Marcos Júnior 70'	Report	André Gomes 90'

Moça Bonita Stadium, Rio de Janeiro
Attendance: 186
Referee: Estêvão Cunha Trindade

==== Final ====
28 April 2012
15:30 UTC−03:00

Fluminense	2 – 0	Volta Redonda
Fábio Braga 52'; Araújo 90+1'	Report

Moça Bonita Stadium, Rio de Janeiro
Attendance: 418
Referee: Leonardo Garcia Cavaleiro

=== Taça Rio knockout stage ===
Semifinals
Bangu	2
Botafogo	4
Flamengo	2
Vasco da Gama	3

Final
Botafogo	3
Vasco da Gama	1

==== Semifinals ====
21 April 2012
18:30 UTC−03:00

Bangu	2 – 4	Botafogo
Lucas Marques 52' (o.g.); Sérgio Júnior 70'	Report	Sebastián Abreu 40', 47', 59'; Maicosuel 90'

Engenhão Stadium, Rio de Janeiro
Attendance: 19786
Referee: Eduardo Cordeiro Guimarães
22 April 2012
16:00 UTC−03:00

Flamengo	2 – 3	Vasco da Gama
Vágner Love 2'; Kleberson 52'	Report	Éder Luís 17'; Felipe 40', 48'

Engenhão Stadium, Rio de Janeiro
Attendance: 20067
Referee: Marcelo de Lima Henrique

==== Final ====
29 April 2012
16:00 UTC−03:00

Botafogo	3 – 1	Vasco da Gama
Sebastián Abreu 3', 45'; Maicosuel 54'	Report	Carlos Alberto 80'

Engenhão Stadium, Rio de Janeiro
Attendance: 41387
Referee: Wagner do Nascimento Magalhães

== Campeonato Carioca Final ==
The 2012 Campeonato Carioca Final was contested by Fluminense and Botafogo as a two-legged tie, with both matches played at Engenhão Stadium.

6 May 2012
16:00 UTC-03:00

Fluminense	4 – 1	Botafogo
Fred 43'; Rafael Sóbis 57', 65'; Marcos Jr. 83'	Report	Renato 8'

Engenhão, Rio de Janeiro
Attendance: 28,182
Referee: Luis Antonio Silva dos Santos
13 May 2012
16:00 UTC-03:00

Botafogo	0 – 1	Fluminense
	Report	Rafael Moura 62'

Engenhão, Rio de Janeiro
Attendance: 25,016
Referee: Marcelo de Lima Henrique

== Overall standings ==
Pos	Team	Pld	W	D	L	GF	GA	GD	Pts	Qualification or relegation
1	Fluminense	15	8	2	5	30	17	+13	26	2013 Copa do Brasil (Fourth Round) (Note: Fluminense and Vasco da Gama qualified for the fourth round of the Copa do Brasil by qualifying for the 2013 Copa Libertadores; their first round Copa do Brasil berths went to the next-best teams in the Campeonato Carioca)
2	Botafogo	15	9	6	0	35	12	+23	33	2013 Copa do Brasil (First Round)
3	Flamengo	15	11	3	1	27	9	+18	36	2013 Copa do Brasil (First Round)
4	Vasco da Gama	15	11	2	2	33	13	+20	35	2013 Copa do Brasil (Fourth Round)
5	Resende	15	7	4	4	20	21	−1	25	2013 Copa do Brasil (First Round) (Note: Resende initially qualified for the 2012 Campeonato Brasileiro Série D but gave up their berth. Volta Redonda entered the competition in their place.)
6	Volta Redonda	15	6	4	5	20	22	−2	22	2013 Copa do Brasil (First Round) and 2012 Campeonato Brasileiro Série D
7	Macaé	15	6	2	7	19	22	−3	20	
8	Friburguense	15	4	5	6	16	21	−5	17	2012 Campeonato Brasileiro Série D (Note: Friburguense qualified for the 2012 Campeonato Brasileiro Série D as 2011 Copa Rio runners-up.)
9	Nova Iguaçu	15	4	5	6	14	20	−6	17	
10	Boavista	15	4	4	7	24	29	−5	16	
11	Duque de Caxias	15	4	4	7	16	24	−8	16	
12	Madureira	15	4	3	8	19	25	−6	15	
13	Bangu	15	4	3	8	17	23	−6	15	2013 Copa do Brasil (First Round) (Note: Bangu qualified for the 2013 Copa do Brasil as 2012 Copa Rio runners-up)
14	Olaria	15	3	5	7	13	24	−11	14	
15	Bonsucesso	15	2	7	6	17	26	−9	13	Relegation to 2013 Campeonato Carioca Série B
16	Americano	15	2	3	10	19	31	−12	9	Relegation to 2013 Campeonato Carioca Série B
