= 2013 Campeonato Carioca =

Campeonato Carioca
- Dates: 19 January – 5 May 2013
- Champions: Botafogo
- Relegated: Olaria; Quissamã
- Copa do Brasil: Boavista; Fluminense; Resende; Vasco da Gama
- Série D: Resende
- Matches: 48
- Top goalscorer: Hernane (12 goals)
- Biggest home win: Botafogo 3-0 Duque de Caxias (1st round); Nova Iguaçu 3-0 Duque de Caxias (3rd round)
- Biggest away win: Audax Rio 0-4 Botafogo (1st round); Friburguense 0-4 Flamengo
- Highest scoring: Vasco da Gama 4-2 Macaé (2nd round) Resende 2-4 Vasco da Gama (3rd round); Vasco da Gama 2-4 Flamengo (4th round); Volta Redonda 2-4 Resende (4th round)
- Longest winning run: 4+ games by Flamengo (round 3- )
- Longest unbeaten run: 3 Teams unbeaten
- Longest losing run: 3 games by Duque de Caxias (round 1-round 3) and Quissamã

The 2013 Campeonato Carioca was the 112th edition of the top tier of the Campeonato Carioca, organized by FFERJ (Federação de Futebol do Estado do Rio de Janeiro, or Rio de Janeiro State Football Federation). The competition began on 19 January and ended on 5 May. Botafogo won.

== Format ==
The sixteen clubs were divided into two groups that played in two phases. In the first phase, the Taça Guanabara, each team played every team from the other group once. The two best teams from each group advanced to the Taça Guanabara playoffs. In the second phase, the Taça Rio, the teams from each group played within their group in a single round-robin format. The two best teams from each group advanced to the Taça Rio playoffs. The winners of the Taça Guanabara and the Taça Rio played for the state championship. If the same team won both phases, they were automatically declared the Campeonato Carioca champion.

The top four teams not otherwise qualified through national and international tournaments qualified for the 2014 Copa do Brasil. The highest-placed team not otherwise playing in the Campeonato Brasileiro Série A, Série B or Série C qualified for the 2013 Campeonato Brasileiro Série D.

== Participating teams ==
Location of teams in the 2013 Campeonato Carioca
Location of teams in the 2013 Campeonato Carioca – city of Rio de Janeiro

Club	Home city	Manager	2012 Result
Audax Rio de Janeiro Esporte Clube	Rio de Janeiro (Bangu) (Note: Although Audax Rio de Janeiro EC was headquartered in São João de Meriti, it played most home games at Moça Bonita Stadium)	Maurício Barbieri	2nd (Série B)
Bangu Atlético Clube	Rio de Janeiro (Bangu)	Cleimar Rocha, Luiz Alexandre and Alfredo Sampaio	13th
Boavista Sport Club	Saquarema	Lucho Nizzo	10th
Botafogo de Futebol e Regatas	Rio de Janeiro (Engenho de Dentro) (Note: Although Botafogo FR is headquartered in Botafogo, it plays home games at Engenhão Stadium)	Oswaldo de Oliveira	2nd
Duque de Caxias Futebol Clube	Duque de Caxias	Josué Teixeira, Júnior Lopes and Mário Marques	11th
Clube de Regatas do Flamengo	Rio de Janeiro (Engenho de Dentro) (Note: Although CR Flamengo is headquartered in Lagoa and normally plays home games at Maracanã Stadium, for the 2013 Campeonato Carioca it played most home games at Engenhão Stadium)	Dorival Junior and Jorginho	3rd
Fluminense Football Club	Rio de Janeiro (Engenho de Dentro) (Note: Although Fluminense FC is headquartered in Laranjeiras and normally plays home games at Maracanã Stadium, for the 2013 Campeonato Carioca it played most home games at Engenhão Stadium)	Abel Braga	1st
Friburguense Atlético Clube	Nova Friburgo	Gérson Andreotti	8th
Macaé Esporte Futebol Clube	Macaé	Toninho Andrade	7th
Madureira Esporte Clube	Rio de Janeiro (Madureira)	Alexandre Gama	12th
Nova Iguaçu Futebol Clube	Nova Iguaçu	Léo Condé	9th
Olaria Atlético Clube	Rio de Janeiro (Olaria)	Chiquinho de Assis and Luiz Antonio Ferreira	14th
Quissamã Futebol Clube	Macaé (Note: Although Quissamã FC is headquartered in Quissamã, it played home games at Moacyrzão Stadium)	Marcelo Buarque, Gabriel Vieira and Marcus Viola	1st (Série B)
Resende Futebol Clube	Resende	Eduardo Allax	5th
Club de Regatas Vasco da Gama	Rio de Janeiro (Vasco da Gama)	Gaúcho and Paulo Autuori	4th
Volta Redonda Futebol Clube	Volta Redonda	Alfredo Sampaio, Élson Roberto and Cairo Lima	6th

== First phase (Taça Guanabara) ==
The 2013 Taça Guanabara began on 19th January and ended on 10th March.

=== Group stage ===
Group A
Pos	Team	Pld	W	D	L	GF	GA	GD	Pts	Qualification or relegation
1	Vasco da Gama	8	5	1	2	18	11	+7	16	Advanced to the Semifinals
2	Botafogo	8	4	3	1	17	7	+10	15	Advanced to the Semifinals
3	Madureira	8	3	3	2	11	10	+1	12	
4	Friburguense	8	2	3	3	10	14	−4	9	
5	Volta Redonda	8	1	3	4	7	12	−5	6	
6	Quissamã	8	1	3	4	2	9	−7	6	
7	Nova Iguaçu	8	1	2	5	7	10	−3	5	
8	Olaria	8	0	3	5	5	14	−9	3	

Updated to match(es) played on 24 February 2013. Source: www.socerway.com
Rules for classification: 1st points; 2nd wins; 3rd goal difference; 4th goals scored; 5th red cards received; 6th yellow cards received; 7th draw.

Group B
Pos	Team	Pld	W	D	L	GF	GA	GD	Pts	Qualification or relegation
1	Flamengo	8	7	1	0	16	3	+13	22	Advanced to the Semifinals
2	Fluminense	8	4	4	0	17	8	+9	16	Advanced to the Semifinals
3	Bangu	8	4	2	2	9	5	+4	14	
4	Boavista	8	4	2	2	8	8	0	14	
5	Audax Rio	8	3	3	2	7	10	−3	12	
6	Macaé	8	2	2	4	11	15	−4	8	
7	Resende	8	1	5	2	13	15	−2	8	
8	Duque de Caxias	8	1	2	5	6	13	−7	5	

Updated to match(es) played on 24 February 2013. Source: www.socerway.com
Rules for classification: 1st points; 2nd wins; 3rd goal difference; 4th goals scored; 5th red cards received; 6th yellow cards received; 7th draw.

=== Final stage ===
Semifinals
Vasco da Gama	3
Fluminense	2
Flamengo	0
Botafogo	2

Final
Vasco da Gama	0
Botafogo	1

==== Semifinals ====
2nd March 2013
18:30 UTC−03:00

Vasco da Gama	3 – 2	Fluminense
Bernardo 68'; Romário Corrêa 82'; Dedé 84'	Report	Thiago Neves 76'; Wellington Nem 77'

Engenhão, Rio de Janeiro
Attendance: 20632
Referee: Rodrigo Nunes de Sá
3rd March 2013
16:00 UTC−03:00

Flamengo	0 – 2	Botafogo
	Report	Júlio César 1'; Vitinho 90+3'

Engenhão, Rio de Janeiro
Attendance: 21545
Referee: Grazianni Maciel Rocha

==== Final ====
10 March 2013
16:00 UTC−03:00

Vasco da Gama	0 – 1	Botafogo
	Report	Lucas Marques 80'

Engenhão, Rio de Janeiro
Attendance: 39400
Referee: Wagner do Nascimento Magalhães

== Second phase (Taça Rio) ==
The 2013 Taça Rio began on 17th March and ended on 5th May.

=== Group stage ===
Group A
Pos	Team	Pld	W	D	L	GF	GA	GD	Pts	Qualification or relegation
1	Botafogo	7	7	0	0	20	3	+17	21	Advanced to the Semifinals
2	Volta Redonda	7	4	1	2	5	3	+2	13	Advanced to the Semifinals
3	Friburguense	7	3	1	3	15	10	+5	10	
4	Olaria	7	2	3	2	3	9	−6	9	
5	Madureira	7	2	2	3	5	6	−1	8	
6	Nova Iguaçu	7	2	2	3	7	10	−3	8	
7	Vasco da Gama	7	2	1	4	5	9	−4	7	
8	Quissamã	7	0	2	5	6	16	−10	2	

Updated to match(es) played on 21 April 2013. Source: www.socerway.com
Rules for classification: 1st points; 2 wins; 3 goal difference; 4 goals scored; 5 red cards received; 6 yellow cards received; 7 draw.

Group B
Pos	Team	Pld	W	D	L	GF	GA	GD	Pts	Qualification or relegation
1	Fluminense	7	5	1	1	11	4	+7	16	Advanced to the Semifinals
2	Resende	7	5	0	2	13	10	+3	15	Advanced to the Semifinals
3	Flamengo	7	3	2	2	12	9	+3	11	
4	Audax Rio	7	3	1	3	7	7	0	10	
5	Duque de Caxias	7	2	3	2	9	9	0	9	
6	Boavista	7	2	2	3	9	11	−2	8	
7	Macaé	7	2	0	5	8	14	−6	6	
8	Bangu	7	0	3	4	5	10	−5	3	

Updated to match(es) played on 21 April 2013. Source: www.socerway.com
Rules for classification: 1st points; 2 wins; 3 goal difference; 4 goals scored; 5 red cards received; 6 yellow cards received; 7 draw.

=== Final stage ===
Semifinals
Botafogo	5
Resende	0
Fluminense	4
Volta Redonda	1

Final
Botafogo	1
Fluminense	0

==== Semifinals ====
27th April 2013
18:30 UTC−03:00

Botafogo	5 – 0	Resende
Dória 12'; Nicolás Lodeiro 17'; Fellype Gabriel 28'; Rafael Marques 54'; Clarence Seedorf 83'	Report

Raulino de Oliveira, Volta Redonda
Attendance: 6867
Referee: Pericles Bassols Pegado Cortez
28th April 2013
16:00 UTC−03:00

Fluminense	4 – 1	Volta Redonda
Rafael Sóbis 11' 51'; Wellington Nem 30'; Thiago Neves 78'	Report	Zé Augusto 12'

Raulino de Oliveira, Volta Redonda
Attendance: 7080
Referee: Wagner do Nascimento Magalhães

==== Final ====
5th May 2013
16:00 UTC−03:00

Botafogo	1 – 0	Fluminense
Rafael Marques 40'	Report

Raulino de Oliveira, Volta Redonda
Attendance: 15516
Referee: Marcelo de Lima Henrique

== Torneio Super Clássicos ==
The Torneio Super Clássicos concerned all regular games between the four "big" clubs: Botafogo, Flamengo, Fluminense and Vasco da Gama.

Pos	Team	Pld	W	D	L	GF	GA	GD	Pts
1	Flamengo (C)	3	3	0	0	8	3	+5	9
2	Botafogo	3	1	1	1	4	2	+2	4
3	Fluminense	3	0	2	1	3	5	−2	2
4	Vasco da Gama	3	0	1	2	3	8	−5	1

(C) Champions

=== 3rd round ===
January 27, 2013
20:30 UTC−02:00

Botafogo	1 – 1	Fluminense
Bolívar 73'	Report	Wellington Nem 42'

Engenhão, Rio de Janeiro
Attendance: 10474
Referee: Pericles Bassols Pegado Cortez

=== 4th round ===
January 31, 2013
20:30 UTC−02:00

Vasco da Gama	2 – 4	Flamengo
Pedro Ken 32'; Dakson 72'	Report	Hernane 24'; Nixon 31'; Cléber Santana 48'; Rafinha 64'

Engenhão, Rio de Janeiro
Attendance: 15669
Referee: Wagner do Nascimento Magalhães

=== 6th round ===
February 09, 2013
18:00 UTC−02:00

Fluminense	1 – 1	Vasco da Gama
Fred 86'	Report	Jean 42' (OG)

Engenhão, Rio de Janeiro
Attendance: 17973
Referee: Grazianni Maciel Rocha

=== 7th round ===
February 17, 2013
18:00 UTC−02:00

Flamengo	1 – 0	Botafogo
Hernane 3'	Report

Engenhão, Rio de Janeiro
Attendance: 25359
Referee: Rodrigo Nunes de Sá

=== 12th round ===
April 3, 2013
19:30 UTC−03:00

Vasco da Gama	0 – 3	Botafogo
	Report	Rafael Marques 52'; Nicolás Lodeiro 58'; Fellype Gabriel 72'

Raulino de Oliveira, Volta Redonda
Attendance: 6994
Referee: Luis Antonio Silva dos Santos

=== 14th round ===
April 14, 2013
18:30 UTC−03:00

Flamengo	3 – 1	Fluminense
Hernane 8'; Renato Abreu 45' (pen.) 47'	Report	Rafael Sóbis 66'

Raulino de Oliveira, Volta Redonda
Attendance: 5973
Referee: Marcelo de Lima Henrique

== Overall table ==
Pos	Team	Pld	W	D	L	GF	GA	GD	Pts	Qualification or relegation
1	Botafogo	15	11	3	1	37	10	+27	36	2014 Copa do Brasil (Fourth Round) (Note: Botafogo and Flamengo qualified for the fourth round of the Copa do Brasil by qualifying for the 2014 Copa Libertadores; their first round Copa do Brasil berths went to the next-best teams in the Campeonato Carioca)
2	Flamengo	15	10	3	2	28	12	+16	33	2014 Copa do Brasil (Fourth Round)
3	Fluminense	15	9	5	1	28	12	+16	32	2014 Copa do Brasil (First Round)
4	Vasco da Gama	15	7	2	6	23	20	+3	23	2014 Copa do Brasil (First Round)
5	Resende	15	6	5	4	26	25	+1	23	2014 Copa do Brasil (First Round) and 2013 Série D
6	Boavista	15	6	4	5	17	19	−2	22	2014 Copa do Brasil (First Round)
7	Audax Rio	15	6	4	5	14	17	−3	22	
8	Madureira	15	5	5	5	16	16	0	20	
9	Friburguense	15	5	4	6	25	24	+1	19	
10	Volta Redonda	15	5	4	6	12	15	−3	19	
11	Bangu	15	4	5	6	14	15	−1	17	
12	Duque de Caxias	15	3	5	7	15	22	−7	14	2014 Copa do Brasil (First Round) (Note: Duque de Caxias qualified as 2013 Copa Rio champions)
13	Macaé	15	4	2	9	19	29	−10	14	
14	Nova Iguaçu	15	3	4	8	14	20	−6	13	2013 Série D (Note: Nova Iguaçu qualified as 2012 Copa Rio champions.)
15	Olaria (R)	15	2	6	7	8	23	−15	12	Relegation to Campeonato Carioca Série B
16	Quissamã (R)	15	1	5	9	8	25	−17	8	Relegation to Campeonato Carioca Série B

Updated to match(es) played on 21 April 2013. Source: www.socerway.com
Rules for classification: 1 stages won 2 points; 3 wins; 4 goal difference; 5 goals scored; 6 red cards received; 7 yellow cards received; 8 draw.
(R) Relegated
