= 2015 Campeonato Carioca =

Campeonato Carioca
- Season: 2015
- Dates: February 1 - May 3, 2015
- Champions: Vasco da Gama
- Relegated: Barra Mansa; Nova Iguaçu
- Copa do Brasil: Botafogo; Flamengo; Fluminense; Vasco da Gama
- Série D: Volta Redonda

The 2015 Campeonato Carioca was the 114th edition of the top tier of the Campeonato Carioca, organized by FFERJ (Federação de Futebol do Estado do Rio de Janeiro, or Rio de Janeiro State Football Federation). The top four teams not otherwise qualified through national and international tournaments qualified for the 2016 Copa do Brasil. The highest-placed team not otherwise playing in the Campeonato Brasileiro Série A, Série B or Série C qualified for the 2015 Campeonato Brasileiro Série D. This edition of the Campeonato Carioca was played as a single round-robin called the Taça Guanabara followed by two-legged semifinals and a two-legged final. Two teams would be relegated: if there were no other teams with the same number of points as the last- and penultimate-placed teams in the Taça Guanabara, then the last- and penultimate-placed teams would be relegated; if more than two teams tied for fewest or second-fewest points in the Taça Guanabara, then a relegation playoff would be played.

== Participating teams ==
Location of teams in the 2015 Campeonato Carioca
Location of teams in the 2015 Campeonato Carioca – city of Rio de Janeiro

Club	Home city	Manager	2014 Result
Bangu Atlético Clube	Rio de Janeiro (Bangu)	Mário Marques	10th
Barra Mansa Futebol Clube	Volta Redonda (Note: Although Barra Mansa FC is headquartered in Barra Mansa, it played all home games at Cidadania Stadium)	Wilson Leite and Manoel Neto	1st (Série B)
Boavista Sport Club	Saquarema	Antônio Carlos Roy, Waldemar Lemos and Rodrigo Beckham	5th
Bonsucesso Futebol Clube	Rio de Janeiro (Bonsucesso) (Note: Bonsucesso FC didn't play any home games at their own stadium; their home games were played in a variety of other stadiums)	Caio Couto and Marcelo Salles	13th
Botafogo de Futebol e Regatas	Rio de Janeiro (Engenho de Dentro) (Note: Although Botafogo FR is headquartered in Botafogo, it plays home games at Engenhão Stadium)	René Simões	9th
Associação Desportiva Cabofriense	Cabo Frio	Alfredo Sampaio and Edson Souza	4th
Clube de Regatas do Flamengo	Rio de Janeiro (Maracanã) (Note: Although CR Flamengo is headquartered in Lagoa, it plays home games at Maracanã Stadium)	Vanderlei Luxemburgo	1st
Fluminense Football Club	Rio de Janeiro (Maracanã) (Note: Although Fluminense FC is headquartered in Laranjeiras, it plays home games at Maracanã Stadium)	Cristóvão Borges and Ricardo Drubscky	3rd
Friburguense Atlético Clube	Nova Friburgo	Gerson Andreotti	6th
Macaé Esporte Futebol Clube	Macaé	Josué Teixeira and Marcelo Cabo	7th
Madureira Esporte Clube	Rio de Janeiro (Madureira)	Toninho Andrade	12th
Nova Iguaçu Futebol Clube	Nova Iguaçu	Eduardo Allax, Renê Weber and Carlos Vitor	8th
Resende Futebol Clube	Resende	Edson Souza, Paulo Campos and Alfredo Sampaio	14th
Esporte Clube Tigres do Brasil	Duque de Caxias	Rubens Barbeiro Filho	2nd (Série B)
Club de Regatas Vasco da Gama	Rio de Janeiro (Vasco da Gama)	Doriva	2nd
Volta Redonda Futebol Clube	Volta Redonda	Marcelo Cabo and Élson Roberto Raymundo	11th

== First phase (Taça Guanabara) ==
Pos	Team	Pld	W	D	L	GF	GA	GD	Pts	Qualification or relegation
1	Botafogo	15	11	3	1	31	9	+22	36	Taça Guanabara champions and Semifinals
2	Flamengo	15	11	3	1	31	9	+22	36	Advanced in Semifinals
3	Vasco da Gama (C)	15	10	3	2	31	13	+18	33	Advanced in Semifinals
4	Fluminense	15	10	1	4	29	15	+14	31	Advanced in Semifinals
5	Madureira	15	9	3	3	26	12	+14	30	
6	Macaé	15	7	5	3	17	14	+3	26	
7	Volta Redonda	15	6	5	4	20	21	−1	23	
8	Bangu	15	6	4	5	22	21	+1	22	
9	Resende	15	4	4	7	18	23	−5	16	
10	Friburguense	15	3	5	7	16	24	−8	14	
11	Bonsucesso	15	2	5	8	8	18	−10	11	
12	Tigres do Brasil	15	1	8	6	10	22	−12	11	
13	Cabofriense	15	3	3	9	13	27	−14	12	
14	Boavista	15	1	5	9	12	27	−15	8	Winner of relegation playoffs
15	Nova Iguaçu (R)	15	1	5	9	10	26	−16	8	Relegation to 2016 Campeonato Carioca Série B
16	Barra Mansa (R)	15	1	6	8	14	27	−13	−6 (Note: Barra Mansa was punished for selecting ineligible players. The club lost 15 points.)	Relegation to 2016 Campeonato Carioca Série B

(C) Champions; (R) Relegated

=== Relegation playoffs ===
Team 1	Agg.	Team 2	1st leg	2nd leg
Boavista	5 – 0	Nova Iguaçu	3 – 0	2 – 0

23 April 2015	Nova Iguaçu	0 - 3	Boavista	Rio de Janeiro
16:00		Report	Anselmo 14' 88'; Lucas 59'	Stadium: Moça Bonita; Attendance: 330; Referee: Pathrice Wallace Maia

26 April 2015	Boavista	2 - 0	Nova Iguaçu	Cabo Frio
16:00	Jeff Silva 26'; Anselmo 48'	Report		Stadium: Correão; Attendance: 520; Referee: Rodrigo Carvalhães Miranda

== Final Stage ==
Semi-finals
Botafogo (p)	1	2	3 (9)
Fluminense	2	1	3 (8)
Flamengo	0	0	0
Vasco da Gama	0	1	1

Finals
Botafogo	0	1	1
Vasco da Gama	1	2	3

=== Semi-finals ===
Team 1	Agg.	Team 2	1st leg	2nd leg
Botafogo	3 – 3 (9–8 p)	Fluminense	1 – 2	2 – 1
Flamengo	0 – 1	Vasco da Gama	0 – 0	0 – 1

==== First leg ====
11 April 2015	Fluminense	2 – 1	Botafogo	Rio de Janeiro
18:30	Fred 41', 74' (pen.)	Report	Willian Arão 85'	Stadium: Maracanã; Attendance: 14,424; Referee: Leonardo Garcia Cavaleiro

12 April 2015	Vasco da Gama	0 – 0	Flamengo	Rio de Janeiro
16:00		Report		Stadium: Maracanã; Attendance: 24,747; Referee: João Batista de Arruda

==== Second leg ====
18 April 2015	Botafogo	2 – 1 (9–8 p)	Fluminense	Rio de Janeiro
18:30	Fernandes 5'; Bill 22'	Report	Jean 43' (pen.)	Stadium: Engenhão; Attendance: 13,958; Referee: Péricles Bassols
	Penalties
	Marcelo Mattos (penalty missed); Gegê (penalty scored); Gilberto (penalty scored); Thiago Carleto (penalty scored); Diego Giaretta (penalty missed); Renan Fonseca (penalty scored); Jobson (penalty scored); Bill (penalty scored); Luis Ricardo (penalty scored); Willian Arão (penalty scored); Renan (penalty scored)		(penalty missed) Kenedy; (penalty scored) Jean; (penalty missed) Gerson; (penalty scored) Renato; (penalty scored) Marlone; (penalty scored) Gum; (penalty scored) Marlon; (penalty scored) Edson; (penalty scored) Robert; (penalty scored) Wellington Silva; (penalty missed) Diego Cavalieri

19 April 2015	Flamengo	0 – 1	Vasco da Gama	Rio de Janeiro
16:00		Report	Gilberto 61' (pen.)	Stadium: Maracanã; Attendance: 48,221; Referee: Rodrigo Nunes de Sá

=== Finals ===
Team 1	Agg.	Team 2	1st leg	2nd leg
Botafogo	1 – 3	Vasco da Gama	0 – 1	1 - 2

26 April 2015	Vasco da Gama	1 – 0	Botafogo	Rio de Janeiro
16:00	Rafael Silva 91'	Report		Stadium: Maracanã; Attendance: 45,488; Referee: Luiz Antonio Silva Santos

3 May 2015	Botafogo	1 – 2	Vasco da Gama	Rio de Janeiro
16:00	Diego Jardel 75'	Report	Rafael Silva 47'; Gilberto 92'	Stadium: Maracanã; Attendance: 66,156; Referee: Wagner Nascimento Magalhães
