= 2011 Campeonato Carioca =

Campeonato Carioca
- Season: 2011
- Champions: Flamengo (32nd title)
- Relegated: America; Cabofriense
- Copa do Brasil: Botafogo; Boavista
- Série D: Volta Redonda
- Matches: 32
- Goals: 102 (3.19 per match)
- Best Player: Thiago Neves
- Top goalscorer: Thiago Neves (8 goals)
- Best goalkeeper: Felipe
- Biggest home win: Fluminense 6-2 Olaria
- Biggest away win: America 0-9 Vasco da Gama
- Highest scoring: America 0-9 Vasco da Gama
- Longest winning run: 7 games: Flamengo
- Longest unbeaten run: Regular season: 15 games: Flamengo; All games: 19 games: Flamengo
- Longest losing run: 5 games: Cabofriense

The 2011 Campeonato Carioca was the 110th edition of the Campeonato Carioca, organized by the Federação de Futebol do Estado do Rio de Janeiro (FERJ). The competition began on 19 January and ended on 15 May. Flamengo won the title.

== Format ==
The sixteen clubs were divided into two groups that played in two phases, the Taça Guanabara and the Taça Rio. In the Taça Guanabara, the teams from each group played all the other teams within their own group once. The top two teams from each group advanced to the Taça Guanabara playoffs and the next two teams played Troféu Washington Rodrigues. In the Taça Rio, each team played all the teams from the other group once. The top two teams from each group advanced to the Taça Rio playoffs and the next two teams from each group contested Troféu Carlos Alberto Torres. If the winners of the Taça Guanabara and the Taça Rio had been different teams, they would've played each other to determine the winner of the Campeonato Carioca; since Flamengo won both phases, they were awarded the title. The worst two teams in the overall standings were relegated to the 2012 Campeonato Carioca Série B.

=== Qualifications ===
The best two teams that did not qualify for the 2012 Copa Libertadores qualified for the 2012 Copa do Brasil. The best team not playing in the Campeonato Brasileiro Série A, Série B, or Série C qualified for the 2011 Campeonato Brasileiro Série D.

== Participating teams ==
Location of teams in the 2011 Campeonato Carioca
Location of teams in the 2011 Campeonato Carioca – city of Rio de Janeiro

Club	Home city	2010 Result
America Football Club	Mesquita	5th
Americano Futebol Clube	Campos dos Goytacazes	12th
Bangu Atlético Clube	Rio de Janeiro (Bangu)	6th
Boavista Sport Club	Saquarema	7th
Botafogo de Futebol e Regatas	Rio de Janeiro (Engenho de Dentro) (Note: Although Botafogo FR is headquartered in Botafogo, it plays home games at Engenhão Stadium)	1st
Associação Desportiva Cabofriense	Cabo Frio	1st (Série B)
Duque de Caxias Futebol Clube	Duque de Caxias	13th
Clube de Regatas do Flamengo	Rio de Janeiro (Engenho de Dentro) (Note: Although CR Flamengo is headquartered in Lagoa and normally plays home games at Maracanã Stadium, for the 2011 Campeonato Carioca it played most home games at Engenhão Stadium)	2nd
Fluminense Football Club	Rio de Janeiro (Engenho de Dentro) (Note: Although Fluminense FC is headquartered in Laranjeiras and normally plays home games at Maracanã Stadium, for the 2011 Campeonato Carioca it played home games at Engenhão Stadium)	3rd
Macaé Esporte Futebol Clube	Macaé	11th
Madureira Esporte Clube	Rio de Janeiro (Madureira)	9th
Nova Iguaçu Futebol Clube	Nova Iguaçu	2nd (Série B)
Olaria Atlético Clube	Rio de Janeiro (Olaria)	8th
Resende Futebol Clube	Resende	14th
Club de Regatas Vasco da Gama	Rio de Janeiro (Vasco da Gama)	4th
Volta Redonda Futebol Clube	Volta Redonda	10th

== Taça Guanabara ==
The 2011 Taça Guanabara began on 19 January and ended on 27 February. Flamengo won their 19th Taça Guanabara.

=== First stage ===
==== Group A ====
Pos	Team	Pld	W	D	L	GF	GA	GD	Pts	Qualification
1	Flamengo	7	7	0	0	14	4	+10	21	Advanced to the Semifinals
2	Boavista	7	4	1	2	15	11	+4	13	Advanced to the Semifinals
3	Resende	7	4	1	2	9	5	+4	13	Advanced to the Troféu Washington Rodrigues
4	Nova Iguaçu	7	3	2	2	12	11	+1	11	Advanced to the Troféu Washington Rodrigues
5	Vasco da Gama	7	2	1	4	16	9	+7	7	
6	Volta Redonda	7	1	2	4	4	7	−3	5	
7	Americano	7	1	2	4	7	14	−7	5	
8	America	7	1	1	5	6	22	−16	4	

Updated to match(es) played on 13 February. Source:
Rules for classification: 1 points; 2 wins; 3 goal difference; 4 goals scored; 5 red cards received; 6 yellow cards received; 7 draw

==== Group B ====
Pos	Team	Pld	W	D	L	GF	GA	GD	Pts	Qualification
1	Fluminense	7	6	0	1	20	9	+11	18	Advanced to the Semifinals
2	Botafogo	7	5	2	0	19	7	+12	17	Advanced to the Semifinals
3	Olaria	7	3	1	3	10	14	−4	10	Advanced to the Troféu Washington Rodrigues
4	Bangu	7	2	3	2	7	7	0	9	Advanced to the Troféu Washington Rodrigues
5	Duque de Caxias	7	2	1	4	14	16	−2	7	
6	Macaé	7	1	4	2	11	13	−2	7	
7	Madureira	7	1	2	4	8	12	−4	5	
8	Cabofriense	7	1	1	5	7	18	−11	4	

Updated to match(es) played on 13 February. Source:
Rules for classification: 1 points; 2 wins; 3 goal difference; 4 goals scored; 5 red cards received; 6 yellow cards received; 7 draw

=== Troféu Washington Rodrigues ===
Semifinals
Resende (pen.)	1 (5)
Bangu	1 (4)
Olaria	3
Nova Iguaçu	1

Final
Resende (pen.)	1 (3)
Olaria	1 (1)

=== Playoffs ===
==== Bracket ====
Semifinals
Flamengo (pen.)	1 (3)
Botafogo	1 (1)
Fluminense	2 (2)
Boavista (pen.)	2 (4)

Final
Flamengo	1
Boavista	0

==== Semifinals ====
19 February
17:00 UTC−02:00

Boavista	2–2	Fluminense
Tony 11'; André Luís 54'	Report	Marquinho 8'; Fred 37'
Penalties
Paulo Rodrigues (penalty scored); Tony (penalty scored); Frontini (penalty scored); Edu Pina (penalty scored)	4–2	(penalty missed) Conca; (penalty scored) Rafael Moura; (penalty scored) Souza; (penalty missed) Rodriguinho

Engenhão Stadium, Rio de Janeiro
Attendance: 18,377
Referee: Wagner do Nascimento Magalhães

20 February
16:00 UTC−03:00

Botafogo	1–1	Flamengo
Abreu 48'	Report	Ronaldo Angelim 14'
Penalties
Márcio Rozário (penalty scored); Éverton (penalty missed); Somália (penalty missed); Renato Cajá (penalty missed)	1–3	(penalty scored) Leonardo Moura; (penalty scored) Renato; (penalty scored) Fernando

Engenhão Stadium, Rio de Janeiro
Attendance: 26,854
Referee: Luís Antonio Silva Santos

==== Final ====
27 February
16:00 UTC−03:00

Boavista	0–1	Flamengo
	Report	Ronaldinho 71'

Engenhão Stadium, Rio de Janeiro
Attendance: 41,708
Referee: Marcelo de Lima Henrique

Taça Guanabara
2011 Champion
Flamengo
19th Title

== Taça Rio ==
=== First stage ===
==== Group A ====
Pos	Team	Pld	W	D	L	GF	GA	GD	Pts	Qualification
1	Vasco da Gama	8	5	2	1	19	10	+9	17	Advanced to the Semifinals
2	Flamengo	8	4	4	0	13	7	+6	16	Advanced to the Semifinals
3	Americano	8	4	2	2	10	14	−4	14	Advanced to the Troféu Carlos Alberto Torres
4	Boavista	8	4	1	3	13	8	+5	13	Advanced to the Troféu Carlos Alberto Torres
5	Volta Redonda	8	3	2	3	11	12	−1	11	
6	Resende	8	2	2	4	12	12	0	8	
7	Nova Iguaçu	8	2	1	5	7	12	−5	7	
8	America	8	1	1	6	7	15	−8	4	

Updated to match(es) played on 9 April. Source:
Rules for classification: 1 points; 2 wins; 3 goal difference; 4 goals scored; 5 red cards received; 6 yellow cards received; 7 draw

==== Group B ====
Pos	Team	Pld	W	D	L	GF	GA	GD	Pts	Qualification
1	Fluminense	8	5	2	1	13	6	+7	17	Advanced to the Semifinals
2	Olaria	8	4	3	1	11	6	+5	15	Advanced to the Semifinals
3	Botafogo	8	4	2	2	13	8	+5	14	Advanced to the Troféu Carlos Alberto Torres
4	Madureira	8	3	2	3	16	15	+1	11	Advanced to the Troféu Carlos Alberto Torres
5	Duque de Caxias	8	3	2	3	10	14	−4	11	
6	Macaé	8	2	2	4	11	14	−3	8	
7	Bangu	8	2	1	5	9	15	−6	7	
8	Cabofriense	8	1	1	6	7	14	−7	4	

Updated to match(es) played on 2 April. Source:
Rules for classification: 1 points; 2 wins; 3 goal difference; 4 goals scored; 5 red cards received; 6 yellow cards received; 7 draw

=== Troféu Carlos Alberto Torres ===
Semifinals
Americano	1
Madureira	2
Botafogo	2
Boavista	5

Final
Madureira	3
Boavista	1

=== Playoffs ===
==== Bracket ====
Semifinals
Vasco da Gama	1
Olaria	0
Fluminense	1 (4)
Flamengo (pen.)	1 (5)

Final
Vasco da Gama	0 (1)
Flamengo	0 (3)

==== Semifinals ====
23 April 2011
18:30 UTC−03:00

Vasco da Gama	1–0	Olaria
Éder Luís 37'	Report

Engenhão Stadium, Rio de Janeiro
Attendance: 28,675
Referee: Patrice Wallace Correa Maia

24 April 2011
16:00 UTC−03:00

Fluminense	1–1	Flamengo
Rafael Moura 22'	Report	Thiago Neves 67'
Penalties
Fred (penalty scored); Souza (penalty missed); Edinho (penalty scored); Conca (penalty scored); Araújo (penalty missed); Gum (penalty scored); Tartá (penalty missed)	4–5	(penalty missed) Renato; (penalty scored) Deivid; (penalty scored) Galhardo; (penalty scored) Bottinelli; (penalty missed) Thiago Neves; (penalty scored) David; (penalty scored) Diego Maurício

Engenhão Stadium, Rio de Janeiro
Attendance: 23,915
Referee: Péricles Bassols Pegado Cortez

==== Final ====
1 May 2011
16:00 UTC−03:00

Vasco da Gama	0–0	Flamengo
	Report
Penalties
Alecsandro (penalty scored); Bernardo (penalty missed); Fellipe Bastos (penalty missed); Élton (penalty missed)	1–3	(penalty scored) Renato Abreu; (penalty missed) Fierro; (penalty scored) Fernando; (penalty scored) Thiago Neves

Engenhão Stadium, Rio de Janeiro
Attendance: 39,029
Referee: Luís Antonio Silva Santos

Taça Rio
2011 Champion
Flamengo
19th Title

== Overall standings ==
Pos	Team	Pld	W	D	L	GF	GA	GD	Pts	Qualification or relegation
1	Flamengo (C)	15	11	4	0	27	11	+16	37	2012 Copa Libertadores (Note: Flamengo and Fluminense qualified via 2011 Campeonato Brasileiro Série A)
2	Fluminense	15	11	2	2	33	15	+18	35	2012 Copa Libertadores
3	Botafogo	15	9	4	2	32	15	+17	31	2012 Copa do Brasil
4	Boavista	15	8	2	5	28	19	+9	26	2012 Copa do Brasil
5	Olaria	15	7	4	4	21	20	+1	25	
6	Vasco da Gama	15	7	3	5	35	19	+16	24	2012 Copa Libertadores (Note: Vasco da Gama qualified as 2011 Copa do Brasil champions)
7	Resende	15	6	3	6	21	17	+4	21	
8	Americano	15	5	4	6	17	28	−11	19	
9	Nova Iguaçu	15	5	3	7	19	23	−4	18	
10	Duque de Caxias	15	5	3	7	23	28	−5	18	
11	Madureira	15	4	4	7	24	28	−4	16	2012 Copa do Brasil (Note: Qualified as 2011 Copa Rio champions)
12	Volta Redonda	15	4	4	7	15	19	−4	16	2011 Série D (Note: Volta Redonda qualified for Serie D because all better-placed teams withdrew.)
13	Bangu	15	4	4	7	16	22	−6	16	
14	Macaé	15	3	6	6	22	27	−5	15	
15	Cabofriense (R)	15	2	2	11	14	32	−18	8	Relegation to 2012 Campeonato Carioca Série B
16	America (R)	15	2	2	11	13	37	−24	8	Relegation to 2012 Campeonato Carioca Série B

Updated to match(es) played on 17 April. Source:
Rules for classification: 1 Tournament Champion and Finalist 2 points; 3 wins; 4 goal difference; 5 goals scored; 6 red cards received; 7 yellow cards received; 8 draw.
This does not apply to defining the relegated Teams. If two or more teams had been tied in point at the end of the tournament, a playoff would have been held
(C) Champions; (R) Relegated

== See also ==
- 2011 Copa Rio
