= Gerson Rodrigues =

Gerson Rodrigues is the name of:

- Gerson Rodrigues (footballer, born 1988), Dutch footballer
- Gerson Rodrigues (footballer, born 1995), Luxembourgish/Portuguese footballer
- Gérson Rodrigues Andreotti, Brazilian footballer
