= Miceli =

Miceli is an Italian surname. Notable people with the surname include:

- Carmelo Miceli (1958–2025), Italian footballer
- Damien Miceli (born 1984), Belgian football player
- Debrah Miceli (born 1963), American wrestler and monster truck driver
- Felisa Miceli (born 1953), Argentine economist
- Jim Miceli (1935–2018), American politician
- Jim Miceli (born 1957), American football coach
- John Miceli, American drummer for the Neverland Express, Meat Loaf and Rainbow
- Justine Miceli (born 1959), American actress
- Luigi Miceli (1824–1906), Italian patriot, politician and military
- Martina Miceli (born 1973), Italian female water polo defender
- Nicola Miceli (born 1971), Italian former professional racing cyclist
- Salvatore Miceli, a member of the Sicilian Mafia
- Salvatore Miceli (born 1974), retired Italian footballer
- Stefano Miceli (born 1975), Italian classical pianist and conductor
- Tony Miceli (born 1960), American jazz vibraphonist, percussionist, educator, and composer
- Vincent Miceli (1915–1991), American theologian and philosopher
- Vito Miceli (1916–1990), Italian general and politician
- Walter Miceli, Brazilian stadium announcer

Miceli may also refer to:

- Miceli's, an Italian restaurant in Hollywood, California
