= Antônio Carlos Roy =

Brazilian football coach (born 1970)

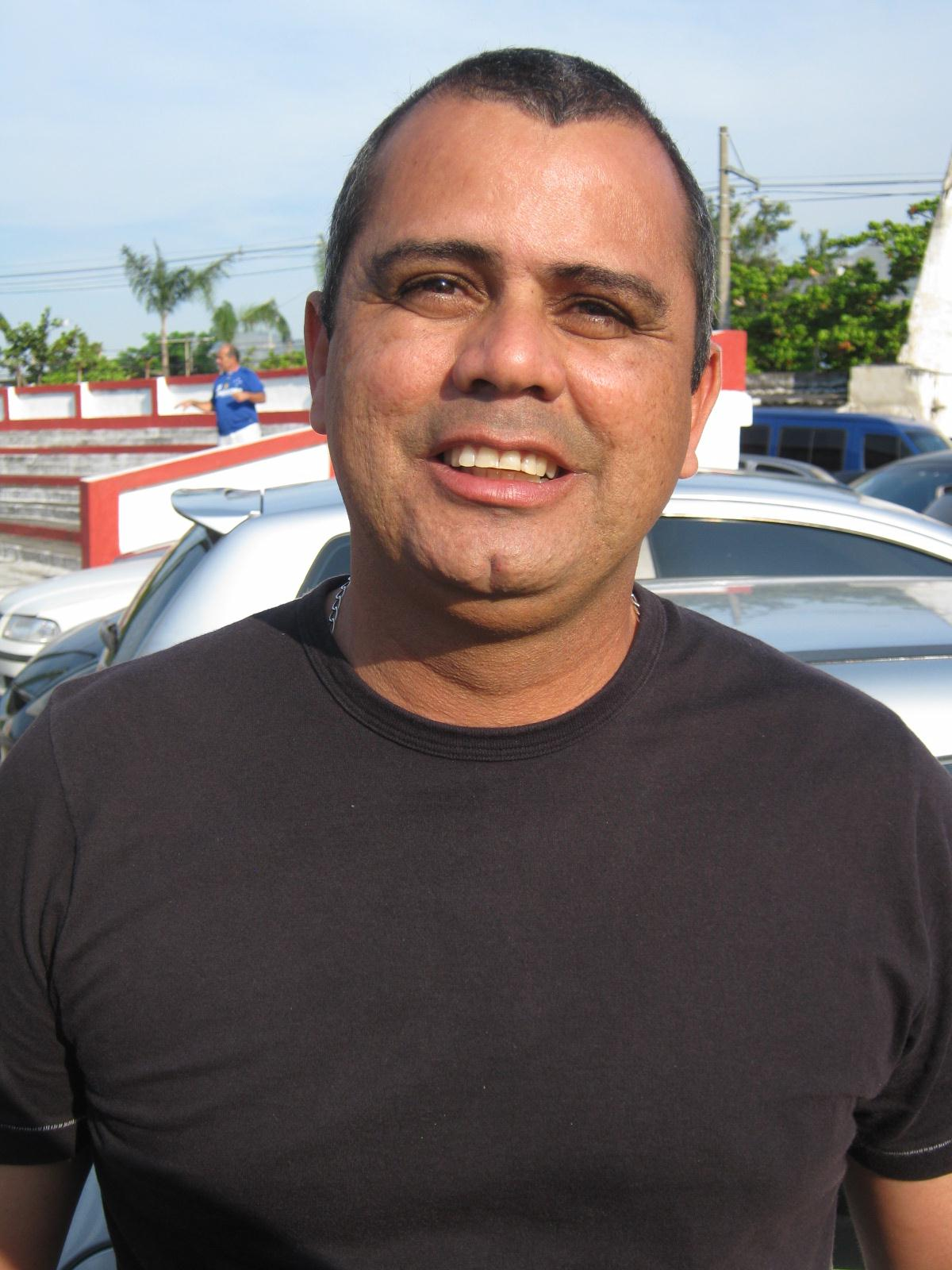

Personal information
- Full name: Antônio Carlos Mendes de Souza
- Date of birth: 21 June 1970 (age 56)
- Place of birth: São Gonçalo, Brazil

Team information
- Current team: Rio Branco

Managerial career
- Years: Team
- 2002–2003: Casimiro de Abreu
- 2004–2005: Friburguense
- 2006: Portuguesa da Ilha
- 2006: Boavista
- 2007: Linhares
- 2007–2008: Resende
- 2008: Bangu
- 2008: Resende
- 2009–2011: Madureira
- 2010: → Cabofriense (loan)
- 2012: America
- 2012: Sampaio Corrêa-RJ
- 2012: Tupi
- 2013: Cabofriense
- 2014: Madureira
- 2014: São Cristóvão
- 2015: Boavista
- 2015: Olaria
- 2016: Galícia
- 2017: Macaé
- 2018: Cabofriense
- 2019: Madureira
- 2019: Galícia
- 2020-: Rio Branco

Antônio Carlos Mendes de Souza, usually known as Antônio Carlos Roy (born 21 June 1970 in São Gonçalo) is a Brazilian football head coach.

== Honours ==
State football
| | Competition | Title | Team | Season |
| (Espírito Santo) | Campeonato Capixaba | 1 | Linhares | 2007 |
| (Rio de Janeiro (state)) | Campeonato Carioca Série B | 3 | Resende | 2007 |
| (Rio de Janeiro (state)) | Campeonato Carioca Série B | 3 | Bangu | 2008 |
| (Rio de Janeiro (state)) | Campeonato Carioca Série B | 3 | Cabofriense | 2010 |
| (Rio de Janeiro (state)) | Campeonato Carioca Série C | 1 | Casimiro de Abreu | 2007 |
