= Fábio Braga =

Portuguese footballer (born 1992)

Personal information
- Full name: Fábio Farroco Braga
- Date of birth: 6 September 1992 (age 34)
- Place of birth: Lisbon, Portugal
- Height: 1.84 m (6 ft 1/2 in)
- Position: Defensive midfielder

Youth career
- Internacional
- 2009–2011: Fluminense

Senior career*
Years	Team	Apps	(Gls)
2012–2015	Fluminense	14	(0)
2014	→ América (RN) (loan)	4	(0)
2015	CSMS Iași	10	(1)
2016	Coritiba	4	(0)
2017	Ponte Preta	2	(0)
- * Club domestic league appearances and goals as of 22 November 2017

Fábio Farroco Braga (born 6 September 1992) is a Portuguese footballer who plays as a defensive midfielder.

== Club career ==
Born in Lisbon, Braga moved to Brazil in 1995, aged two. In 2009, he joined Fluminense's youth setup, after a stint at Internacional, and was promoted to the former's first team ahead of the 2012 campaign.

Braga made his senior debut on 21 January 2012, coming on as a late substitute for Alejandro Martinuccio in a 3–0 home win against Friburguense for the Campeonato Carioca championship. He scored his first goal on 28 April, netting the first in a 2–0 home success over Volta Redonda.

Braga made his Série A debut on 20 May, starting in a 1–0 win at Corinthians, and finished the season with eight league matches, as his side was crowned champions. In August 2013 he was linked to a move to Modena, but the deal later collapsed.

On 27 August 2014, after being rarely used, Braga was loaned to América-RN until December. He appeared in only four matches for the side, which eventually suffered relegation.

On 28 January 2015 Braga moved to CSM Studențesc Iași, signing a six-month contract after being released by Flu. He scored his first professional goal on 9 March, netting the last in a 2–0 away win against FC Petrolul Ploiești.

Braga returned to Brazil on 6 January 2016, signing for Coritiba Foot Ball Club. Unused as they finished runners-up in the Campeonato Paranaense, he made his debut on 4 June, replacing César González for the final 20 minutes of a 2–1 loss at national champions Sport Club Corinthians Paulista.

On 11 January 2017, Braga signed for Associação Atlética Ponte Preta for the year. He made one appearance as they came runners-up in the Campeonato Paulista, as a late substitute for Clayson in a 3–3 draw at Esporte Clube Santo André. On 25 July, having added just two more appearances in the national league, he was released from his contract, as was Lins.

== Personal life ==
Braga's father, Abel, was also a footballer. A central defender, he also represented Fluminense. His younger brother João Pedro died in a fall from a balcony at their Rio de Janeiro home in July 2017, aged 19.

== Career statistics ==
(Correct as of 25 April 2015)

Club	Season	League		Cup		Continental		Other		Total	
Club	Season	Apps	Goals	Apps	Goals	Apps	Goals	Apps	Goals	Apps	Goals
Fluminense	2012	8	0	0	0	0	0	6	1	14	1
Fluminense	2013	6	0	0	0	0	0	3	0	9	0
Fluminense	Subtotal	14	0	0	0	0	0	9	1	23	1
América-RN	2014	4	0	—		—		—		4	0
CSMS Iași	2014–15	10	1	0	0	0	0	—		10	1
Total		28	1	0	0	0	0	9	1	37	2

== Honours ==
Fluminense

- Campeonato Carioca: 2012
- Série A: 2012
