= Ernani (footballer) =

Brazilian footballer

Personal information
- Full name: Ernani do Nascimento Germano
- Date of birth: 16 July 1984 (age 42)
- Place of birth: São João da Barra, Brazil
- Height: 1.85 m (6 ft 1 in)
- Position: Left-back

Team information
- Current team: Água Santa

Youth career
- Rio Branco
- Americano

Senior career*
Years	Team	Apps	(Gls)
2004	Americano	0	(0)
2006–2010	Iraty	0	(0)
2006	→ Marília (loan)	0	(0)
2006–2007	→ Juventude (loan)	0	(0)
2007–2009	→ Americano (loan)	0	(0)
2009–2010	→ Vasco da Gama (loan)	18	(1)
2011	Vitória	5	(0)
2011	Duque de Caxias	10	(1)
2012	Boavista-RJ	5	(1)
2012	Mirassol	5	(0)
2013	Vila Nova-GO	11	(1)
2013–2014	Macaé	21	(1)
2014	Cabofriense	5	(0)
2014–2015	Cuiabá EC	1	(0)
2015	Mamoré	8	(0)
2015–2016	Macaé	1	(0)
2016	Madureira	0	(1)
2016	Ypiranga	0	(0)
2016	Juventude	8	(0)
2017	Guarani	0	(0)
2018	Desportiva Ferroviária		(0)
2019	Goytacaz	0	(0)
2019	Santo André	0	(0)
2019–	Água Santa		
- * Club domestic league appearances and goals as of 24 May 2016

Ernani do Nascimento Germano, better known as Ernani (São João da Barra, 16 July 1982) is a Brazilian footballer who plays as a left-back for Desportiva Ferroviária.

== Career ==
Ernani took his first steps in football Iraty, where he soon moved to the Youth, after a pass off in southern Brazil, also played for Marília and finally signed with the American team of Campos, Rio de Janeiro. Did an excellent Campeonato Carioca, Ernani received an offer of big clubs like Botafogo and Flamengo, but ended up going to Vasco da Gama, where he wears the shirt 46.

Ernani was revealed by Americano in 2004 after he was traded to the Iraty after standing out in the State in 2006. His clubs were in the youth Rio Branco, Campos, and Americano, also from Campos.

In January 2010 suffered a car accident in Rio de Janeiro, where he fractured his pelvis. The expected recovery time was three months.

Before joining Brazilian side Vitória on 4 January 2011, he played for Vasco da Gama.

== Career statistics ==
(Correct as of 16 October 2010)

Club	Season	State League		Brazilian Série B		Copa do Brasil		Copa Libertadores		Copa Sudamericana		Total	
Club	Season	Apps	Goals	Apps	Goals	Apps	Goals	Apps	Goals	Apps	Goals	Apps	Goals
Vasco da Gama	2009	-	-	11	0	-	-	-	-	-	-	11	0
Club	Season	State League		Brazilian Série A		Copa do Brasil		Copa Libertadores		Copa Sudamericana		Total	
Club	Season	Apps	Goals	Apps	Goals	Apps	Goals	Apps	Goals	Apps	Goals	Apps	Goals
Vasco da Gama	2010	0	0	7	1	0	0	-	-	-	-	7	1
Total		0	0	18	1	0	0	-	-	-	-	18	1
