= Jóbson =

Brazilian footballer (born 1988)

Personal information
- Full name: Jóbson Leandro Pereira de Oliveira
- Date of birth: 15 February 1988 (age 38)
- Place of birth: Conceição do Araguaia, Brazil
- Height: 1.78 m (5 ft 10 in)
- Position: Forward

Team information
- Current team: Independente-PA

Youth career
- Brasiliense

Senior career*
Years	Team	Apps	(Gls)
2007–2010	Brasiliense	61	(22)
2008	→ Santa Maria-DF (loan)	0	(0)
2009	→ Jeju United (loan)	17	(4)
2009	→ Botafogo (loan)	12	(5)
2010–2015	Botafogo	18	(6)
2011	→ Atlético Mineiro (loan)	4	(0)
2011	→ Bahia (loan)	14	(6)
2012	→ Grêmio Barueri (loan)	4	(0)
2013	→ São Caetano (loan)	0	(0)
2013–2014	→ Ittihad (loan)	13	(5)
2018–2019	Brasiliense	1	(0)
2018	→ Capital (loan)	5	(2)
2019	→ Capital (loan)	5	(3)
2020	Portuguesa-RJ	1	(0)
2020	Independente Tucuruí	2	(0)
2020	União Cacoalense	0	(0)
2020	Campinense	13	(3)
2021	Luziânia	0	(0)
2021	União Cacoalense	8	(2)
2021	Capixaba	0	(0)
2022	Sport Lagoa Seca	5	(0)
2022	Santo Ângelo	0	(0)
2023	Rio Branco-PR	5	(0)
2023	Capixaba	6	(2)
2024	Rio Branco-AC	0	(0)
2024–2025	Capixaba	11	(4)
2025–	Jaraguá-SC	0	(0)
- * Club domestic league appearances and goals as of 19:14, 19 May 2025 (UTC)

Jóbson Leandro Pereira de Oliveira (born 15 February 1988, in Conceição do Araguaia) is a Brazilian footballer who plays for Jaraguá-SC.

== Career ==
Jóbson started his career at Brasiliense, winning the Campeonato Brasiliense in 2007 and 2008. He also played for Santa Maria in the Distrito Federal before being loaned to South Korean club Jeju United in 2009.

On 23 September 2009 Botafogo de Futebol e Regatas signed Jóbson on loan until December. After showing great football at Botafogo, he was about to be signed by Cruzeiro, but the deal was cancelled since he failed two anti-doping tests on November after smoking crack cocaine.

On 19 January 2010, Jóbson received a two-year ban from football by the Superior Tribunal de Justiça Desportiva de Futebol (STJD) of Confederação Brasileira de Futebol (CBF) for his doping case. In April 2010, after an appeal, the ban was reduced to six months after considerations that he failed the second test without knowledge of the first failure. After his ban was over, he signed a five-year deal with Botafogo, despite an unsuccessful attempt to sign the player again on loan at first. On 10 December 2010, WADA appealed to FIFA and later the highest sports court – Court of Arbitration for Sport (CAS) to have Jóbson serve the full-time ban.

After constant disciplinary issues, Jóbson was dropped from the first team and joined Atlético Mineiro on loan for the 2011 season. However, he was released from Atlético after only three months. On 4 May 2011, he was loaned out to Bahia, but again was released after only three months after constantly being late to training sessions and travels.

On 14 September 2011, CAS upheld WADA appeal, which Jóbson would be suspended for the remaining 1 1/2 years of the ban since 6 September 2010, effectively ruling him out of the 2011 season and part of the 2012 state league. His first game back with Botafogo was on 10 March 2012 against Bangu.

On 1 June 2012, Jóbson was loaned to Grêmio Barueri. However, he decided to leave the club after only 40 days claiming he was unadapted and that the club lacked supporters.

In January 2013, he was loaned to São Caetano for one year. He left the club in May 2013 after being taken into custody for assaulting his wife. Lacking interested clubs to offload the player in Brazil, Botafogo loaned Jóbson to Saudi club Ittihad FC in August 2013. After refusing to undergo an anti-doping test at Ittihad FC he received a four-year ban in Saudi Arabia in 2014, leading to his return to Brazil.

Jóbson received a new opportunity at Botafogo during the second half of 2014 but did not impress, playing 8 times and failing to score. However, in 2015, he became one of the key players for the team at 2015 Campeonato Carioca, helping his club to reach the final. On 24 April 2015, right before the first leg of the Campeonato Carioca final, FIFA stated that Jóbson's four-year suspension would be applied not only in Saudi Arabia, but worldwide, banning the player from professional football until April 2018.

On 10 July 2018, Jóbson resumed his professional career after signing for Brasiliense Futebol Clube. With no further matches to be played in 2018, Brasiliense loaned him to Capital until the end of the year, where he won the 2018 Campeonato Brasiliense 2nd division.

Back to Brasiliense in 2019, Jóbson played for the club in a pre-season friendly match against Uberaba. On 22 January, he was suspended by the club by disciplinary reasons. On 20 February, he was again loaned out to Capital until the end of the 2019 Campeonato Brasiliense. In the beginning of December 2019, he then signed with Portuguesa-RJ. However, after playing for only 45 minutes for the club, he was told that he was no longer in the club's plans. Jóbson then revealed, that the club had told him that he was overweight and then sent him to the club's third team. Jóbson then signed with Independente-PA at the end of February 2020, after leaving Portuguesa.

== Sexual abuse allegations and arrest ==
On 23 June 2016, Jóbson was arrested in northern Brazil under the accusation that he raped four teenage girls, aged 12 to 14, after luring them to a party with alcohol.

On 5 June 2017, he was arrested after a traffic accident which resulted in one death and was also violating conditions of his previous parole. After violating the conditions of his new parole, he returned to jail on September, leaving on 27 April 2018.
