= Bruno Barra =

Brazilian footballer

Personal information
- Full name: Bruno Sérgio Jaime
- Date of birth: 11 April 1986 (age 40)
- Place of birth: Barra do Piraí, Brazil
- Height: 1.79 m (5 ft 10 in)
- Position: Defensive midfielder

Team information
- Current team: Volta Redonda
- Number: 5

Youth career
- 2004–2006: Volta Redonda

Senior career*
Years	Team	Apps	(Gls)
2006–2016	Volta Redonda	119	(8)
2009	→ Paraíba do Sul (loan)		
2010	→ Barra Mansa (loan)		
2011–2012	→ Macaé (loan)	32	(0)
2015	→ Tombense (loan)	10	(0)
2016	Atlético Goianiense	19	(0)
2017	Oeste	17	(1)
2017–	Volta Redonda	287	(18)
- * Club domestic league appearances and goals as of 11 November 2026

Bruno Sérgio Jaime (born 11 April 1986), better known as Bruno Barra, is a Brazilian professional footballer who plays as a defensive midfielder for Volta Redonda FC.

== Career ==
Revealed at Volta Redonda FC, Bruno Barra (nickname received for being born in Barra do Piraí) became, over the years, the greatest player in the history of the club, accounting for more than 380 appearances, surpassing even the 343 matches of Valtinho, another historical idol of Volta Redonda FC. He had some spells in other teams, such as in 2016 at Atlético Goianiense, where he was champion of Série B of the Brazilian Championship.

== Honours ==
Atlético Goianiense

- Campeonato Brasileiro Série B: 2016

Volta Redonda

- Copa Rio: 2007, 2022
- Taça Rio: 2016
- Campeonato Carioca Série A2: 2022
- Torneio Independência: 2023
- Campeonato Brasileiro Série C: 2024
