= Quissamã Futebol Clube =

Quissamã
- Full name: Quissamã Futebol Clube
- Nickname(s): Quissamáquina; Barçamã
- Founded: January 5, 1919
- Dissolved: 2014
- Ground: Estádio Antônio Carneiro da Silva, Quissamã, Rio de Janeiro state, Brazil
- Capacity: 3,000
Home colors	Away colors

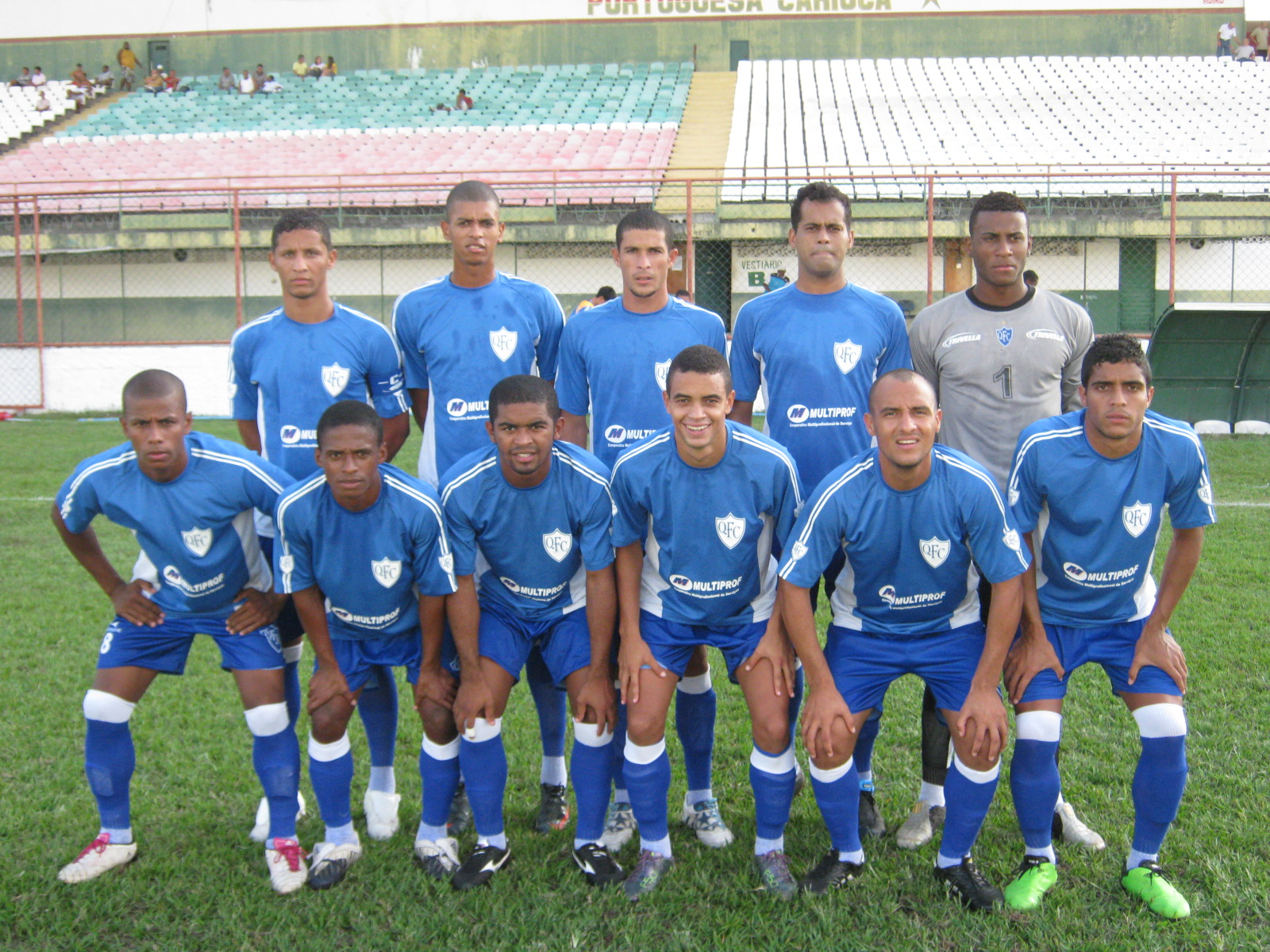
Team photo from the 2011 season

Quissamã Futebol Clube, commonly known as Quissamã, was a Brazilian football club based in Quissamã, Rio de Janeiro state.

== History ==
The club was founded on January 5, 1919. They won the Campeonato Carioca Third Level in 2008 and the Second Level in 2012. They competed in the Campeonato Carioca in 2013.

== Honours ==
- Campeonato Carioca Série A2
  - Winners (1): 2012
- Campeonato Carioca Série B1
  - Winners (1): 2008

== Stadium ==
Quissamã Futebol Clube play their home games at Estádio Antônio Carneiro da Silva. The stadium has a maximum capacity of 3,000 people.
