= Clube Atlético Castelo Branco =

Castelo Branco
- Full name: Clube Atlético Castelo Branco
- Founded: November 9, 1990
- Dissolved: 2012; 14 years ago
- Ground: Estádio Moça Bonita, Rio de Janeiro, Rio de Janeiro state, Brazil
- Capacity: 9,564
| Home colors | Away colors | Third colors |

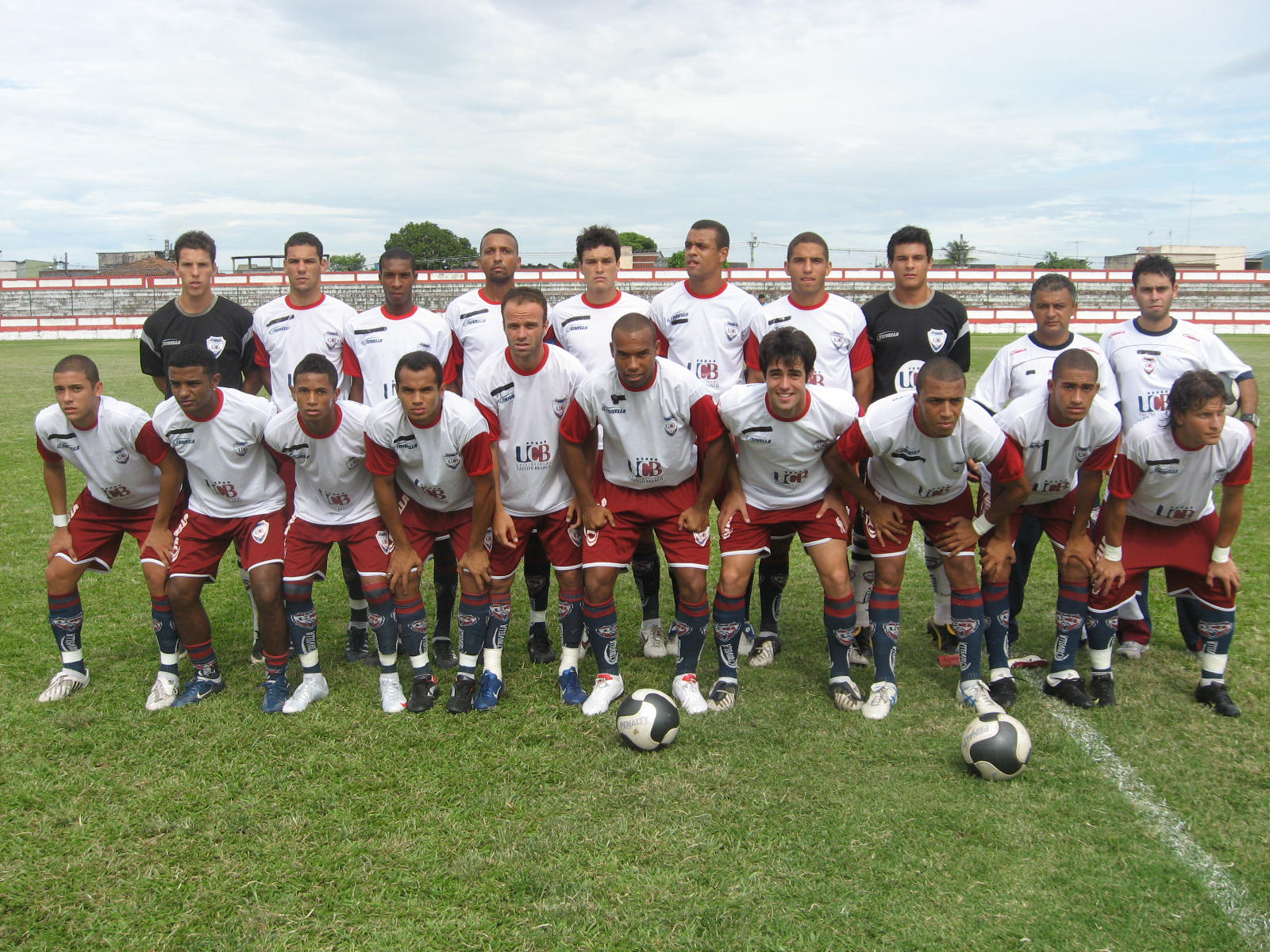
Team photo from the 2009 season

Clube Atlético Castelo Branco, commonly known as Castelo Branco, was a Brazilian football club based in Rio de Janeiro city, Rio de Janeiro state.

== History ==
The club was founded on November 9, 1990, by the Universidade Castelo Branco college. The club competed in their first professional competition in 2007, when they were eliminated in the Third Stage of the Campeonato Carioca Third Level.

== Stadium ==
Clube Atlético Castelo Branco play their home games at Estádio Proletário Guilherme da Silveira Filho, better known as Estádio Moça Bonita, located in Bangu neighborhood. The stadium has a maximum capacity of 9,564 people.
