= São Januário =

Football stadium in Rio de Janeiro, Brazil

Estádio Vasco da Gama
- São Januário
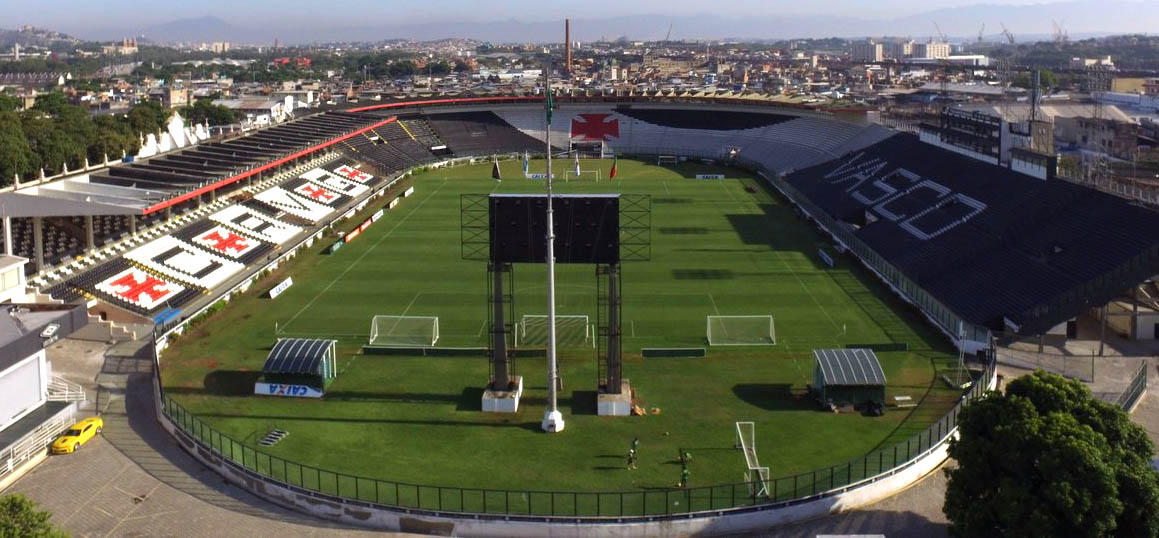
- Sisbrace
- Interactive map of Estádio Vasco da Gama
- Full name: Estádio Vasco da Gama
- Location: Vasco da Gama, Rio de Janeiro, Brazil
- Coordinates: 22°53′27″S 43°13′42″W
- Owner: CR Vasco da Gama
- Operator: CR Vasco da Gama
- Capacity: 24,584 (currently 21,880)
- Surface: Grass
- Record attendance: 40,209 (Vasco da Gama 0–2 Londrina, February 19, 1978)
- Field size: 105 m × 68 m (344 ft × 223 ft)

Construction
- Built: 1926–1927
- Opened: 21 April 1927; 99 years ago
- Renovated: 2006, 2012
- Architect: Ricardo Severo

Tenant
- CR Vasco da Gama (1927–present)

Estádio Vasco da Gama, popularly known as São Januário owing to its location on a street of the same name, is a Brazilian football stadium belonging to CR Vasco da Gama. It is located in the neighborhood of Vasco da Gama, in the north zone of Rio de Janeiro, on a hill near the National Observatory of Brazil. Because of its position, it has given Vasco the nickname of Gigante da Colina (Giant of the Hill).

São Januário is considered by fans, journalists, professors and politicians as a symbol of struggle and resistance against racism in the history of Brazil. This stadium has also historic importance, because Brazilian president Getúlio Vargas used it many times to deliver speeches to the Brazilian people. Vargas announced the first Brazilian work laws on the tribune of São Januário.

== History ==
After Vasco da Gama won its first Campeonato Carioca in its debut year in 1923, with a squad made up of blacks and workers known as Camisas Negras (Black Shirts), the other clubs in Rio de Janeiro founded a new league (AMEA, Associação Metropolitana de Esportes Atléticos) and only allowed Vasco to participate if dismissed 12 of his athletes (all black), claiming that they had a "dubious profession" and that the club did not have its own stadium (even though most clubs in the league did not). Faced with the imposed situation, in 1924, the Vasco's president, José Augusto Prestes, envied a letter to AMEA, which came to be known as the "Resposta Histórica" (Historical Response), refusing to submit to the imposed condition and withdrawing from membership in the AMEA.

The following year, the club overcame the resistance of the AMEA, managed to join the entity and again competed in the championship under the condition of playing their games in the Andarahy Athletico Club field. Despite this, Vasco decided to build its own stadium, to end any demand. São Januário was erected thanks to the supporters themselves, who led the fundraising campaign to buy the land in São Cristóvão (currently the Vasco da Gama neighborhood), chosen by Vasco because it is São Januário farm, which had been a gift from Dom Pedro I to the Marchioness of Santos, similar to his foundation site.

On April 21, 1927, Vasco da Gama inaugurated the São Januário stadium, the largest stadium in the Americas until 1930, when the Estadio Centenario was inaugurated in Montevideo (for the first World Cup). Until 1940, when Pacaembu was inaugurated in São Paulo, the stadium was the largest in Brazil, and until 1950, when Maracanã was inaugurated, it was the largest in Rio de Janeiro. The stadium had a capacity of 24,584 and it was inaugurated with the presence of Washington Luís, Brazilian president in that time. The first event held in the stadium was a match between Vasco and Santos, which Santos won. The stadium stands as the biggest private venue in the state of Rio de Janeiro. Two years later, its lighting would be inaugurated, becoming the only club in the country with a stadium capable of hosting night games.

=== Renovation ===
In June 2024, the Municipal Chamber of Rio de Janeiro approved the São Januário renovation project. The following month, mayor Eduardo Paes sanctioned the reform. The money raised will be through the sale of the land's construction potential. The capacity will be for around 48,000 fans, with plans to increase it to 57,000.

== Structure ==
=== Aquatics centre ===
The São Januario Aquatics Centre opened on August 30, 1953, and is used by the swimming school. In 1998, it held one event of the FINA Swimming World Cup.

=== Courts ===
This stadium has two courts. The first opened on September 23, 1956, and it is the main court. In 1999, this court was remodeled and its capacity increased to 2,500 seats. The second court, denominated forninho ("little oven" in Portuguese), is smaller than main and it is located behind the Aquatic park.

=== Chapel ===
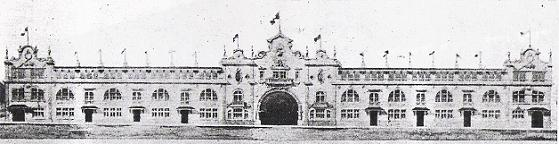
Main facade of the stadium in 1927

A chapel, known in Portuguese as Capela de Nossa Senhora das Vitórias, is located between the stadium and the adjacent aquatic park. The project of this chapel was made by Álvaro Nascimento Rodrigues and José Ribeiro de Paiva and it was opened on August 15, 1955.

The importance of this chapel is so big that many projects to remodel the stadium was discarded just because they considered its demolition.

=== Trophy room ===
Located just after the stadium front door, the trophy room has about 8,000 trophies, cup, plates, medals and photos earnings on the whole club's history.

== Social engagement ==
The club has a close relationship with the favela covered by São Januario, known as Barreira do Vasco (Vasco's Barrier) has social projects in the community, and about 90 employees of the club are local residents. It is a place for fans to meet and celebrate before and after matches. The favela stands out for its rich local cuisine and its strong connection with Vasco da Gama. The sense of belonging is mutual between the community and the club, and what affects one consequently affects the other.

The community is made up of street vendors who depend on the games taking place in São Januário to support their families. In 2023, the Public Prosecutor's Office closed São Januário, in a decision called "racist and elistist" by the favela movements. The interdiction of the stadium affected the lives of residents and merchants of the community, who suffered the impacts of the absence of fans there. Because of this, in a match in which Vasco was going to play in Salvador, Bahia, the supporters filled Vasco's Barrier to watch the team play on a big screen, helping to boost local commerce.

== Largest attendances ==
#	Attendance	Home	Result	Away	Date	Tournament
1	40,209	(Brazil) Vasco da Gama	0–2	(Brazil) Londrina	February 19, 1978	Campeonato Brasileiro Série A
2	36,910	(Brazil) Vasco da Gama	2–2	(Brazil) Vitória	November 21, 1999	Campeonato Brasileiro Série A
3	36,273	(Brazil) Vasco da Gama	2–0	(Ecuador) Barcelona SC	August 12, 1998	Copa Libertadores finals first leg
4	35,308	(Brazil) Vasco da Gama	2–0	(Brazil) Internacional	September 26, 1999	Campeonato Brasileiro Série A
5	34,147	(Brazil) Vasco da Gama	2–1	(Brazil) Ponte Preta	August 20, 2000	Campeonato Brasileiro Série A
6	33,814	(Brazil) Vasco da Gama	1–1	(Brazil) Paraná	September 19, 1999	Campeonato Brasileiro Série A
7	33,516	(Brazil) Vasco da Gama	2–1	(Brazil) Atlético Paranaense	October 31, 1999	Campeonato Brasileiro Série A
8	33.428	(Brazil) Vasco da Gama	2–1	(Brazil) Palmeiras	October 16, 1999	Campeonato Brasileiro Série A
9	33,378	(Brazil) Vasco da Gama	2–0	(Brazil) Fluminense	October 30, 1949	Campeonato Carioca
10	33,330	(Brazil) Vasco da Gama	0–0	(Brazil) Cruzeiro	May 23, 1998	Copa do Brasil semifinals second leg
11	32,672	(Brazil) Vasco da Gama	2–1	(Brazil) Flamengo	September 14, 1947	Campeonato Carioca
12	30,254	(Brazil) Vasco da Gama	6–0	(Brazil) Joinville	March 25, 1984	Campeonato Brasileiro

== Derbies in football ==
Until the construction of Maracanã, Vasco used to play the city derbies at São Januário. After Maracanã was opened, in 1950, the derbies moved to there. Since then, though, a few of those derbies have been played at São Januário, mostly when Maracanã was undergoing refurbishing. On February 14, 2016, Vasco return to play a derby in São Januário since 2005, the match was against Flamengo for the Campeonato Carioca, with Vasco winning, 1–0.

Here is Vasco's home record against its major rivals:

Opponent	G	W	L	D	GF	GA	GD
(Brazil) Fluminense	46	22	13	11	81	56	25
(Brazil) Botafogo	45	18	12	15	68	52	16
(Brazil) Flamengo	35	16	10	9	67	51	16
G – games played; W - wins; L - losses; D - draws; GF – goals for; GA – goals against; GD – goal differential

== See also ==
- Walter Miceli

Preceded by Estadio George Capwell; Guayaquil	South American Championship; Final Venue; 1949	Succeeded by Estadio Nacional de Lima; Lima
