= Taça Rio =

Annual Brazilian football tournament

Taça Rio (English: Rio Cup) is an annual football tournament attached to Campeonato Carioca, the state football league in the Rio de Janeiro state. It has been organized since 1982 by the Rio de Janeiro State Football Federation. It has had different formats throughout its history. Since 2026, it has been played between clubs that lose the quarter-finals in the Campeonato Carioca knockout phase.

Vasco da Gama is the most successful club in the tournament's history, having won the title eleven times.

== Format ==
The Taça Rio and Taça Guanabara has become, throughout its history, recognized for the various changes in its format, causing confusion for many spectators.

Since 2021, it has been played between clubs that finished 5th to 8th in the Taça Guanabara, the first single round-robin phase of the Campeonato Carioca. There are two semi-finals, sixth place will face seventh and fifth will face eighth. The two winners compete in the final. All games are two-legged tie format.

Starting in 2026, the Taça Rio will be contested between the clubs that lost the quarter-finals of the knockout phase of the Campeonato Carioca.

== History ==
Taça Rio was created in 1982, as an equivalent to Taça Guanabara. While Taça Guanabara is the name of the trophy given to the Campeonato Carioca first stage winner, Taça Rio is the trophy given to the second stage champion.

Taça Rio was not held only in 1994 and 1995, during the time format of Taça Guanabara was changed. During these two years, though teams were still divided into two groups, the matches that played against teams from other group, traditional matches of Taça Rio, became the second phase of the group stage of the Taça Guanabara. Therefore, there was no need for the Taça Rio to be held.

In 1996, the traditional competition format returned, and the Taça Rio was contested again and the trophy was again given to the Campeonato Carioca second round champion.

== List of champions ==
Year	Champions	Runners-up
1982	America (1)	Botafogo
1983	Flamengo (1)	Bangu
1984	Vasco da Gama (1)	Fluminense
1985	Flamengo (2)	Bangu
1986	Flamengo (3)	Fluminense
1987	Bangu (1)	Vasco da Gama
1988	Vasco da Gama (2)	Fluminense
1989	Botafogo (1)	Vasco da Gama
1990	Fluminense (1)	Botafogo
1991	Flamengo (4)	Botafogo
1992	Vasco da Gama (3)	Flamengo
1993	Vasco da Gama (4)	Flamengo
1996	Flamengo (5)	Vasco da Gama
1997	Botafogo (2)	Flamengo
1998	Vasco da Gama (5)	Fluminense
1999	Vasco da Gama (6)	Flamengo
2000	Flamengo (6)	Vasco da Gama
2001	Vasco da Gama (7)	Flamengo
2002	Americano (1)	Vasco da Gama
2003	Vasco da Gama (8)	Fluminense
2004	Vasco da Gama (9)	Fluminense
2005	Fluminense (2)	Flamengo
2006	Madureira (1)	Americano
2007	Botafogo (3)	Cabofriense
2008	Botafogo (4)	Fluminense
2009	Flamengo (7)	Botafogo
2010	Botafogo (5)	Flamengo
2011	Flamengo (8)	Vasco da Gama
2012	Botafogo (6)	Vasco da Gama
2013	Botafogo (7)	Fluminense
2014	Boavista (1)	Friburguense
2015	Madureira (2)	Bangu
2016	Volta Redonda (1)	Resende
2017	Vasco da Gama (10)	Botafogo
2018	Fluminense (3)	Botafogo
2019	Flamengo (9)	Vasco da Gama
2020	Fluminense (4)	Flamengo
2021	Vasco da Gama (11)	Botafogo
2022	Resende (1)	Nova Iguaçu
2023	Botafogo (8)	Audax
2024	Botafogo (9)	Boavista
2025	Sampaio Corrêa (1)	Madureira
2026	Botafogo (10)	Bangu

== Titles by club ==
- Vasco da Gama 11 titles
- Botafogo 10 titles
- Flamengo 9 titles
- Fluminense 4 titles
- Madureira 2 titles
- America 1 title
- Americano 1 title
- Bangu 1 title
- Boavista 1 title
- Resende 1 title
- Volta Redonda 1 title
- Sampaio Corrêa 1 title

== See also ==
- Campeonato Carioca
- Taça Guanabara
