= Correão =

Multi-use stadium in Cabo Frio, Brazil

Coordinates: 22°53′23.31″S 42°02′24.02″W

- Interactive map of Correão
- Former names: Estádio Alair Corrêa
- Location: Cabo Frio, Brazil
- Capacity: 12,000

Tenants
- Associação Desportiva Cabofriense

Correão, also known Estádio Alair Corrêa, is a multi-use stadium located in Cabo Frio, Brazil. It is used mostly for football matches and hosts the home matches of Associação Desportiva Cabofriense. The stadium has a maximum capacity of 12,000 people. The stadium is named after former Cabo Frio mayor Alair Francisco Corrêa, who governed the city from 2001 to 2004.
