= Jones Leandro =

Brazilian footballer

Jones
Personal information
- Full name: Jones Leandro Souza da Silva
- Date of birth: April 29, 1984 (age 42)
- Place of birth: Angra dos Reis, Brazil
- Height: 1.78 m (5 ft 10 in)
- Position: Forward

Team information
- Current team: Serra Macaense

Youth career
- 2002–2003: Volta Redonda
- 2003–2004: Friburguense
- 2004–2005: Macaé

Senior career*
Years	Team	Apps	(Gls)
2005–2006	Friburguense		
2006–2007	Estrela da Amadora	22	(0)
2007	Guanabara		
2008	Macaé		
2008	Bahia		
2009	Madureira		
2009	Macaé		
2009	Al-Nasr		
2010	Guarany de Sobral		
2010	Al-Nasr		
2011	Al-Arabi		
2012	Nova Iguaçu	11	(4)
2012–2013	Macaé	33	(11)
2012–2013	Metropolitano	10	(3)
2013	São Luiz	9	(1)
2014	Marcílio Dias	7	(2)
2014	Cabofriense	15	(2)
2015–2016	Macaé	31	(9)
2016	Nacional AM	5	(2)
2017	Macaé	5	(0)
2018	Democrata GV	7	(0)
2018	Angra dos Reis	12	(4)
2019	Operário MS	6	(3)
2019	São Gonçalo	11	(0)
2020	Macaé	1	(1)
2020–	Serra Macaense	3	(1)
2021–	Angra dos Reis	5	(1)
- * Club domestic league appearances and goals

Jones Leandro Souza da Silva (born April 29, 1984) is a Brazilian footballer who plays as a forward for Angra dos Reis
