= Gabriel Vieira =

Brazilian footballer (born 1977)

Gabriel Antonio Viera Júnior (born November 14, 1977, in Sorocaba) is a Brazilian former professional footballer who played as a midfielder.

== Teams ==
- General Caballero 2011–
