= Estádio Giulite Coutinho =

Football stadium in Rio de Janeiro, Brazil

Coordinates: 22°47′43″S 43°25′11″W

- Estádio Édson Passos
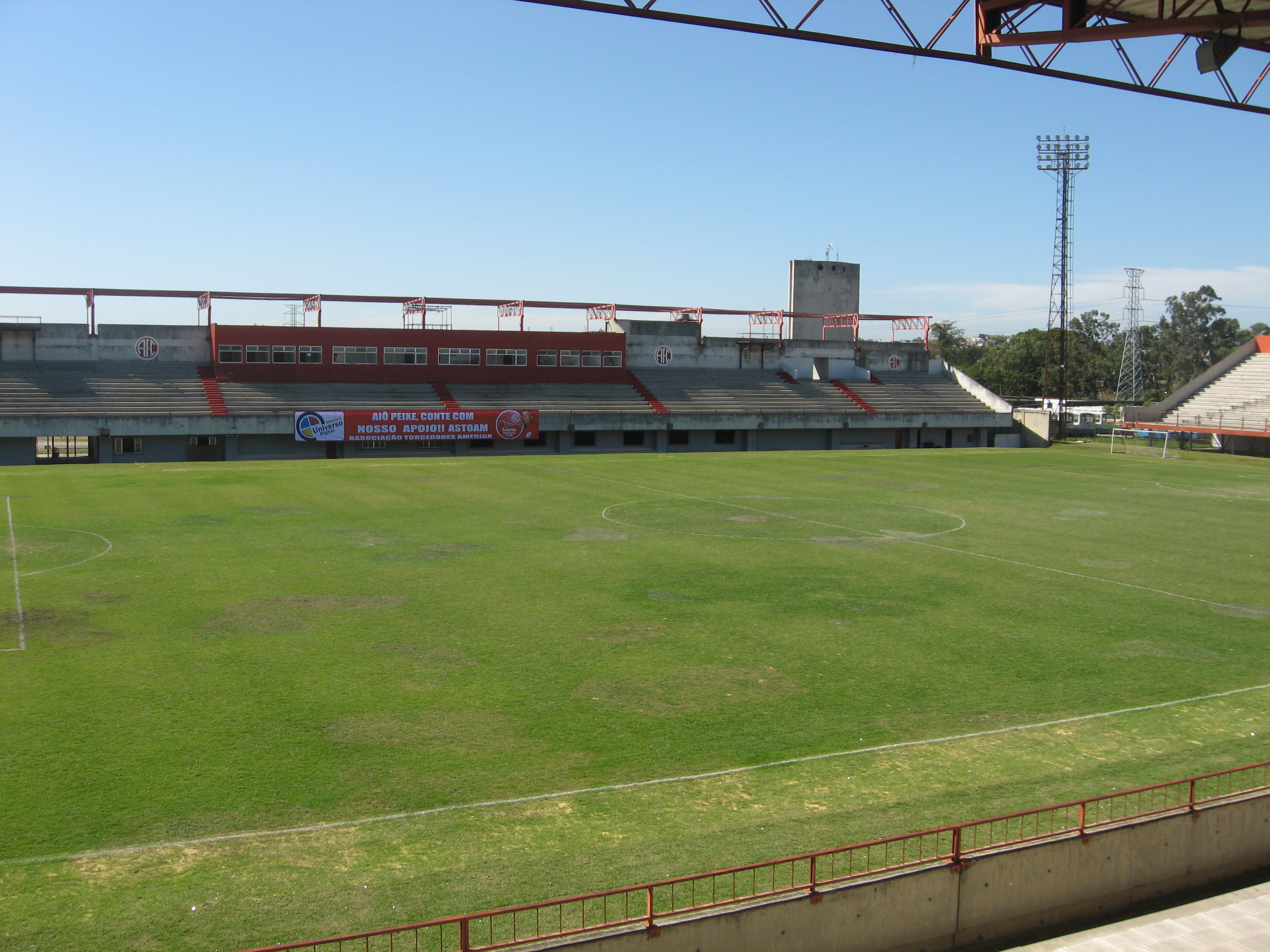
- Sisbrace
- Interactive map of Estádio Giulite Coutinho
- Location: Mesquita, Rio de Janeiro State, Brazil
- Owner: America Football Club
- Capacity: 13,544
- Surface: Grass
- Field size: 110 m × 75 m (361 ft × 246 ft)

Construction
- Opened: January 23, 2000

Tenants
- America Football Club; Nova Iguaçu; Tigres (2004–2008)

Estádio Giulite Coutinho, also known as Estádio Édson Passos, is a multi-use stadium located in the city of Mesquita, Rio de Janeiro State, Brazil. It is used mostly for football matches and hosts the home matches of Fluminense, America Football Club and Nova Iguaçu. The stadium has a maximum capacity of 13,544 spectators and was built in 2000.

== History ==
The stadium was inaugurated on January 23, 2000, when America beat a Rio de Janeiro State Combined Team by 3–1. The first goal of the stadium was scored by Rio de Janeiro State Combined Team's Sorato.

Estádio Giulite Coutinho's attendance record currently stands at 9,009, set on March 5, 2006, when America and Flamengo drew 2–2.
