= Toninho Andrade =

Brazilian football manager (born 1964)

Personal information
- Full name: José Antônio Rabelo de Andrade
- Date of birth: 1 January 1964 (age 62)
- Place of birth: Rio de Janeiro, Brazil

Managerial career
- Years: Team
- 1999–2002: Olaria
- 2003: Portuguesa-RJ
- 2004: Americano
- 2006: Bonsucesso
- 2006: Macaé
- 2007: Ituano
- 2008: Olaria
- 2008–2009: Americano
- 2009–2010: Macaé
- 2010: Americano
- 2010: Rio Branco-ES
- 2011: Americano
- 2011: Rio Branco-ES
- 2011–2013: Macaé
- 2013: Cabofriense
- 2014: Volta Redonda
- 2015: Madureira
- 2015: Macaé
- 2016: Bonsucesso
- 2016: Resende
- 2017: Macaé
- 2018: Bonsucesso
- 2019: Volta Redonda
- 2020–2021: Madureira
- 2021: Cabofriense
- 2022: Portuguesa-RJ
- 2023: Macaé
- 2023: Bonsucesso
- 2024–2025: Paduano
- 2026: Madureira

José Antônio Rabelo de Andrade (born 1 January 1964), known as Toninho Andrade, is a Brazilian football coach.

== Honours ==
Portuguesa-RJ

- Campeonato Carioca Série B: 2003

Cabofriense

- Campeonato Carioca Série B: 2013

Madureira

- Taça Rio: 2015
