= Walter Miceli =

Brazilian stadium announcer

Walter Miceli of Brazil held the world record for the longest working career as a stadium announcer. He has been the stadium announcer at the Estádio São Januário, Rio de Janeiro, Brazil, home of CR Vasco da Gama since 12 February 1947. He died in 2001.
