= 2011 Copa Rio =

Tournament details
- Country: Brazil
- Teams: 17

2011 Copa Rio also known as Copa Rio de Profissionais 2011, was the 14th edition of Copa Rio. 17 teams participated in the tournament.

The winner chose between the 2012 Campeonato Brasileiro Série D and the 2012 Copa do Brasil qualification. The runner-up qualified for the other tournament.

== Format ==
The clubs were divided into four groups of five. The best two teams in each group and the two best 3rd-placed teams advanced to the second stage. In the second stage the clubs were divided into two groups of four. The best two teams in each group advance to the knockout stage.

== Participating teams ==
Team	Qualification method
America-RJ	12 best places in 2010 Campeonato Carioca
Bangu	12 best places in 2010 Campeonato Carioca
Boavista	12 best places in 2010 Campeonato Carioca
Olaria	12 best places in 2010 Campeonato Carioca
Madureira	12 best places in 2010 Campeonato Carioca
Volta Redonda	12 best places in 2010 Campeonato Carioca
Macaé	12 best places in 2010 Campeonato Carioca
Americano	12 best places in 2010 Campeonato Carioca
Duque de Caxias	12 best places in 2010 Campeonato Carioca
Resende	12 best places in 2010 Campeonato Carioca
Friburguense	12 best places in 2010 Campeonato Carioca
Cabofriense	4 best places in 2010 Campeonato Carioca; Serie B
Nova Iguaçu	4 best places in 2010 Campeonato Carioca; Serie B
Bonsucesso	4 best places in 2010 Campeonato Carioca; Serie B
São João da Barra	3 best places in 2010 Campeonato Carioca; Serie C
Serra Macaense	3 best places in 2010 Campeonato Carioca; Serie C
Audax Rio	2010 Copa Rio champions

== First stage ==
Key to colours in group tables
Group winners, runners-up and best two 3rd placed teams
Teams which can no longer advance to the Semifinals

=== Group A ===
Team	Pld	W	D	L	GF	GA	GD	Pts
Resende	14	8	2	2	15	6	+9	14
Volta Redonda	14	8	2	2	9	6	+3	14
Boavista	8	4	0	4	7	10	-3	12
Bonsucesso	8	1	6	1	8	7	+1	8
São João da Barra	8	1	2	5	4	14	-10	5

=== Group B ===
Team	Pld	W	D	L	GF	GA	GD	Pts
Friburguense	6	4	1	1	17	10	+6	13
Macaé	6	3	1	2	9	8	+1	10
Bangu	6	2	2	2	10	9	+1	8
Cabofriense	6	1	0	5	7	15	-8	3

=== Group C ===
Team	Pld	W	D	L	GF	GA	GD	Pts
Audax Rio	6	3	3	0	10	5	+5	12
Serra Macaense	6	2	2	2	11	9	+2	8
Olaria	6	1	3	2	8	11	-3	6
Americano	6	1	2	3	8	12	-4	5

=== Group D ===
Team	Pld	W	D	L	GF	GA	GD	Pts
Madureira	6	4	1	1	10	5	+5	13
Duque de Caxias	6	3	0	3	6	12	-6	9
America-RJ	6	2	2	2	10	9	+1	8
Nova Iguaçu	6	1	1	4	11	11	0	4

=== Ranking of 3rd placed teams ===
For the determination of the best two 3rd placed teams the índice técnico (Pts+GD)/Pld is used.

Team	Pld	W	D	L	GF	GA	GD	Pts	IT
America-RJ	6	2	2	2	10	9	+1	8	1,50
Bangu	6	2	2	2	10	9	+1	8	1,50
Boavista	8	4	0	4	7	10	-3	12	1,13
Olaria	6	1	3	2	8	11	-3	6	0,50

== Final stage ==
Semifinals
Friburguense
Bangu
Macaé
Madureira

Finals
