= Gerson Rodrigues (footballer, born 1988) =

Dutch footballer

Gerson Rodrigues (born 16 June 1988 in Rotterdam) is a Dutch footballer who played for Eerste Divisie club FC Dordrecht during the 2006-2008 football seasons.
