= Quissamã =

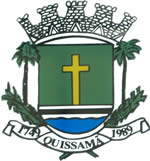
- Flag Coat of arms

- Location of Quisamã in Rio de Janeiro State and Brazil
- Coordinates: 22°06′25″S 41°28′19″W
- Country: Brazil
- Region: Southeast
- State: Rio de Janeiro
- Colonization started: 1633
- Settled as Freguesia: 1755
- Municipality Established: January 4, 1989

Government
  - Mayor: Fátima Pacheco ( 2017 - atual )

Area
  - Total: 715.877 km^{2} (276.402 sq mi)
- Elevation: 20 m (66 ft)

Population (2020)
  - Total: 25,126
  - Density: 24.3/km^{2} (63/sq mi)
- Time zone: UTC−3 (BRT)
- Website: www.quissama.rj.gov.br

Quissamã (Portuguese pronunciation: [kisɐˈmɐ̃]) is a municipality located in the Brazilian state of Rio de Janeiro. It sits on Atlantic coastline with the two largest neighboring cities being Campos dos Goytacazes to the north and Macaé to the south. Quissamã was part of the municipality of Macaé until the city emancipated in 1989. The population has surpassed 20,000 inhabitants as of the 2010 Census. The city's primary source of tax revenue comes from oil royalties collected from drilling in the waters just off its coast.
