= Marcelo Salles =

Brazilian footballer (born 1978)

Personal information
- Full name: Luiz Marcelo de Castro Salles
- Date of birth: 6 February 1978 (age 48)
- Place of birth: Rio de Janeiro, Brazil
- Height: 1.80 m (5 ft 11 in)
- Position: Centre back

Senior career*
Years	Team	Apps	(Gls)
1998	Nova Iguaçu		

Managerial career
- 2005–2010: Flamengo (assistant)
- 2010: Brasiliense (assistant)
- 2011: Cruzeiro (assistant)
- 2012: Bahia (assistant)
- 2013: Rio Branco-ES
- 2013: Nova Iguaçu
- 2014: Nova Iguaçu
- 2014: Vasco da Gama (assistant)
- 2015: Bonsucesso
- 2015: Audax Rio
- 2015: Bonsucesso
- 2016: Imperatriz
- 2016: Portuguesa-RJ
- 2016: Sampaio Corrêa-RJ
- 2017: Boavista (assistant)
- 2018: Bonsucesso
- 2018: Volta Redonda
- 2019: Nova Iguaçu
- 2019–2020: Flamengo (assistant)
- 2019: Flamengo (interim)
- 2021: Flamengo (assistant)
- 2022: Rubio Ñu
- 2023–2024: Grêmio (assistant)
- * Club domestic league appearances and goals

Luiz Marcelo de Castro Salles (born 6 February 1978) is a Brazilian footballer who played as a central defender is currently without a club.

== Career ==
Salles started his career at Flamengo in 2000, and became the assistant manager of the first team in 2005, under Joel Santana. In 2009, he was also Andrade's assistant as the club lifted the Série A trophy.

Salles subsequently followed Andrade to Brasiliense in 2010, and was also Santana's second at Cruzeiro and Bahia. He started his managerial career in March 2013, after being appointed manager of Rio Branco-ES.

Salles subsequently managed Nova Iguaçu (three stints), Bonsucesso (three stints), Audax Rio, Imperatriz, Portuguesa-RJ, Sampaio Corrêa-RJ and Volta Redonda. In 2019, he returned to Fla, again as an assistant.

On 29 May 2019, after Abel Braga's resignation, Salles was named interim manager until the arrival of Jorge Jesus in July.

== Personal life ==
Salles is the son of Marco Antônio, a Brazilian former international footballer who played two FIFA World Cups, lifting the 1970 edition.
