= Mário Marques (footballer) =

Brazilian footballer

Mário
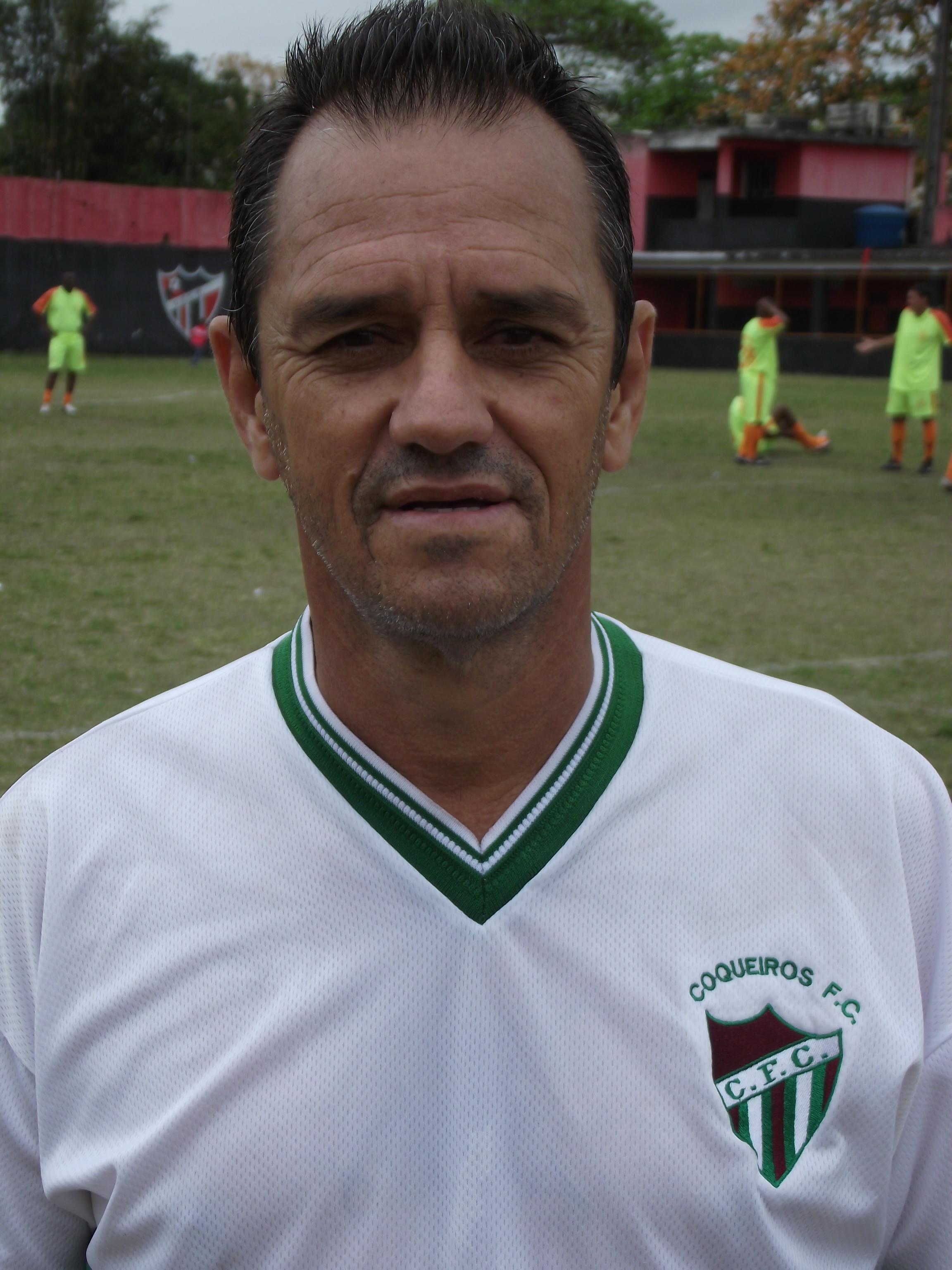

Personal information
- Full name: Mário Marques Coelho
- Date of birth: 24 March 1957 (age 69)
- Place of birth: Rio de Janeiro, Brazil
- Height: 1.68 m (5 ft 6 in)
- Position: Midfielder

Youth career
- Fluminense

Senior career*
Years	Team	Apps	(Gls)
1977–1982	Fluminense	201	(25)
1977	→ Goiânia (loan)		
1982	→ Inter de Limeira (loan)		
1982–1986	Bangu	151	(14)
1983	→ Goiás (loan)		
1984	→ Vasco da Gama (loan)	39	(4)
1984	→ Grêmio (loan)	14	(1)
1986–1987	Botafogo		
1987–1988	Sporting CP	48	(3)
1989	Estrela da Amadora	9	(0)
1989–1990	America-RJ		
1990	Barretos		
1991–1992	America-RJ		
1992	ABC		

Managerial career
- 1996: Barreira-RJ
- 1999: Portuguesa-RJ
- 2000: ABC
- 2001: Vitória (assistant)
- 2002: America-RJ
- 2003: Portuguesa-RJ
- 2004: America-RJ
- 2005: Angra dos Reis
- 2006–2007: Nova Iguaçu
- 2007: Cardoso Moreira
- 2008: Boavista-RJ
- 2009: Fluminense (U20)
- 2009: Macaé
- 2010–2011: Fluminense (U20)
- 2011: Cabofriense
- 2011–2012: Duque de Caxias
- 2012: Goytacaz
- 2013: Duque de Caxias
- 2014: Angra dos Reis
- 2014–2015: Bangu
- 2015: Gonçalense
- 2016: Bonsucesso
- 2016: Macaé
- 2016: Bangu
- 2018: Bangu
- 2021–2023: São Vicente Pereira
- * Club domestic league appearances and goals

Mário Marques Coelho (born 24 March 1957), simply known as Mário or Mário Marques, is a Brazilian former professional footballer and manager who played as a midfielder.

== Playing career ==
Formed in the youth categories of Fluminense FC, Mário was a central midfielder. He was one of the main players in winning the state championship in 1980. He was later acquired from Bangu, where he made 151 appearances. He was Brazilian runner-up in 1984 on loan to Vasco da Gama, and in 1985 with Bangu. He also had brief spells at Grêmio and Botafogo. After competing in the 1986 Copa Libertadores, he was sold to Sporting CP, where he was champion of the Supertaça Cândido de Oliveira. He later played for Estrela da Amadora before returning to Brazil. He worked for America-RJ, Barretos and ABC, where he retired.

== Managerial career ==
As a coach, Mário Marques stood out when managing teams in Rio de Janeiro in particular. He managed the America team during the beginning of the 2002 Torneio Rio-São Paulo., in addition to Portuguesa-RJ, Angra dos Reis, Nova Iguaçu, Cardoso Moreira, Boavista and the under-20 team of Fluminense FC. In 2009 he had a quick spell at Macaé in the Campeonato Carioca.

Marques managed Duque de Caxias FC in the 2013 Campeonato Brasileiro Série C. In 2014 he managed Angra dos Reis again, and arrived at Bangu, which was in Rio's second division at the time. He had a few more spells at the club, such as in 2016 and 2018.

== Personal life ==
His son, Mário Marques Coelho Júnior, better known as Juninho, was also a professional footballer, playing for teams in Portugal minor divisions such as A.D. Sanjoanense and G.S. Loures.

== Honours ==
=== Player ===
Fluminense

- Campeonato Carioca: 1980
- Copa Governador Faria Lima: 1977

Sporting CP

- Supertaça Cândido de Oliveira: 1987

=== Manager ===
Bangu

- BTV Cup: 2015
