= Estádio Moça Bonita =

Football stadium in Brazil

Coordinates: 22°52′20.99″S 43°27′23.67″W

Estádio Proletário Guilherme da Silveira Filho
- Estádio Moça Bonita
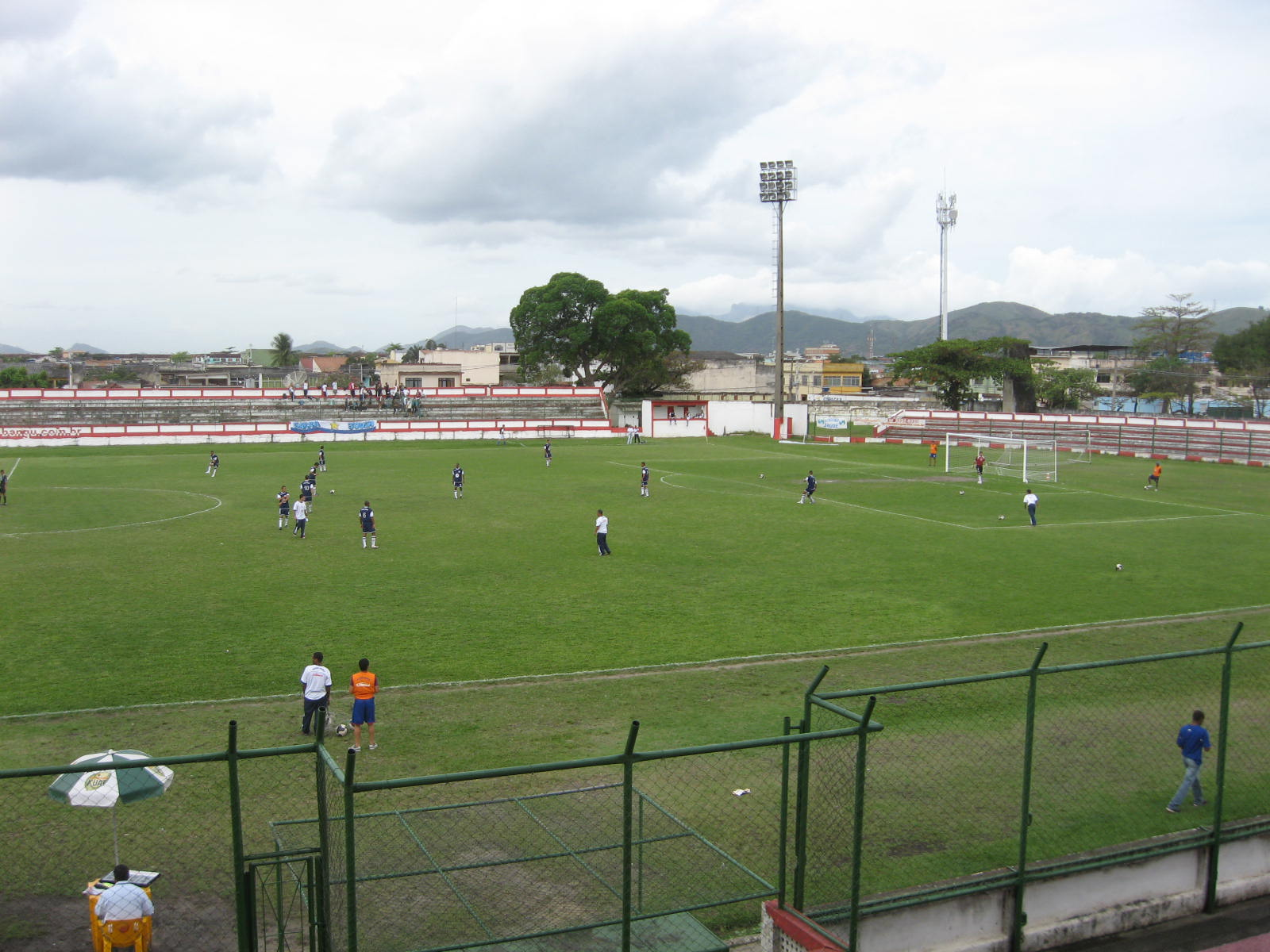
- Sisbrace
- Interactive map of Estádio Proletário Guilherme da Silveira Filho
- Full name: Estádio Proletário Guilherme da Silveira Filho
- Location: Rio de Janeiro, Rio de Janeiro state, Brazil
- Owner: Fábrica Bangu
- Operator: Bangu Atlético Clube
- Capacity: 9,024
- Surface: Grass

Construction
- Opened: November 17, 1947

Tenants
- Bangu Atlético Clube; Clube Atlético Castelo Branco

The Estádio Proletário Guilherme da Silveira Filho, but usually known as Estádio Moça Bonita is a football stadium inaugurated in 1947 in Bangu neighborhood, Rio de Janeiro, state of Rio de Janeiro, with a maximum capacity of 9,564 people.

Estádio Moça Bonita is owned by Fábrica Bangu. It hosts the games of Bangu Atlético Clube and Clube Atlético Castelo Branco. The stadium is named after Guilherme da Silveira Filho, who was Bangu's president during the stadium construction. The nickname Moça Bonita means Pretty Girl.

== History ==
In 1947, the works on Moça Bonita were completed. It was inaugurated on November 17 of that year, but the inaugural match was played only on December 12, when Flamengo beat Bangu 4–2. The first goal of the stadium was scored by Flamengo's Joel Rezende.

The stadium's attendance record currently stands at 17,000, set on July 3, 1948 when Bangu and Fluminense drew 1-1.

On April 20, 1980, Palmeiras beat Bangu 1–0. The match's attendance was 16,779 people, much higher than the current capacity.
