= Vasco da Gama, Rio de Janeiro =

Vasco da Gama
- Neighborhood
- Location in Rio de Janeiro Vasco da Gama (Brazil)
- Coordinates: 22°53′31″S 43°13′37″W
- Country: Brazil
- State: Rio de Janeiro (RJ)
- Municipality/City: Rio de Janeiro
- Zone: North

Population (2010)
  - Total: 9,202

Vasco da Gama is a neighborhood of Rio de Janeiro, Brazil. It was created in honor of the centenary of the football club CR Vasco da Gama in 1998, where its stadium, São Januário, is located. The club was named after the Portuguese explorer Vasco da Gama. Until 1997, it was part of the São Cristóvão neighborhood.
