= Gérson Andreotti =

Brazilian footballer and manager (born 1953)

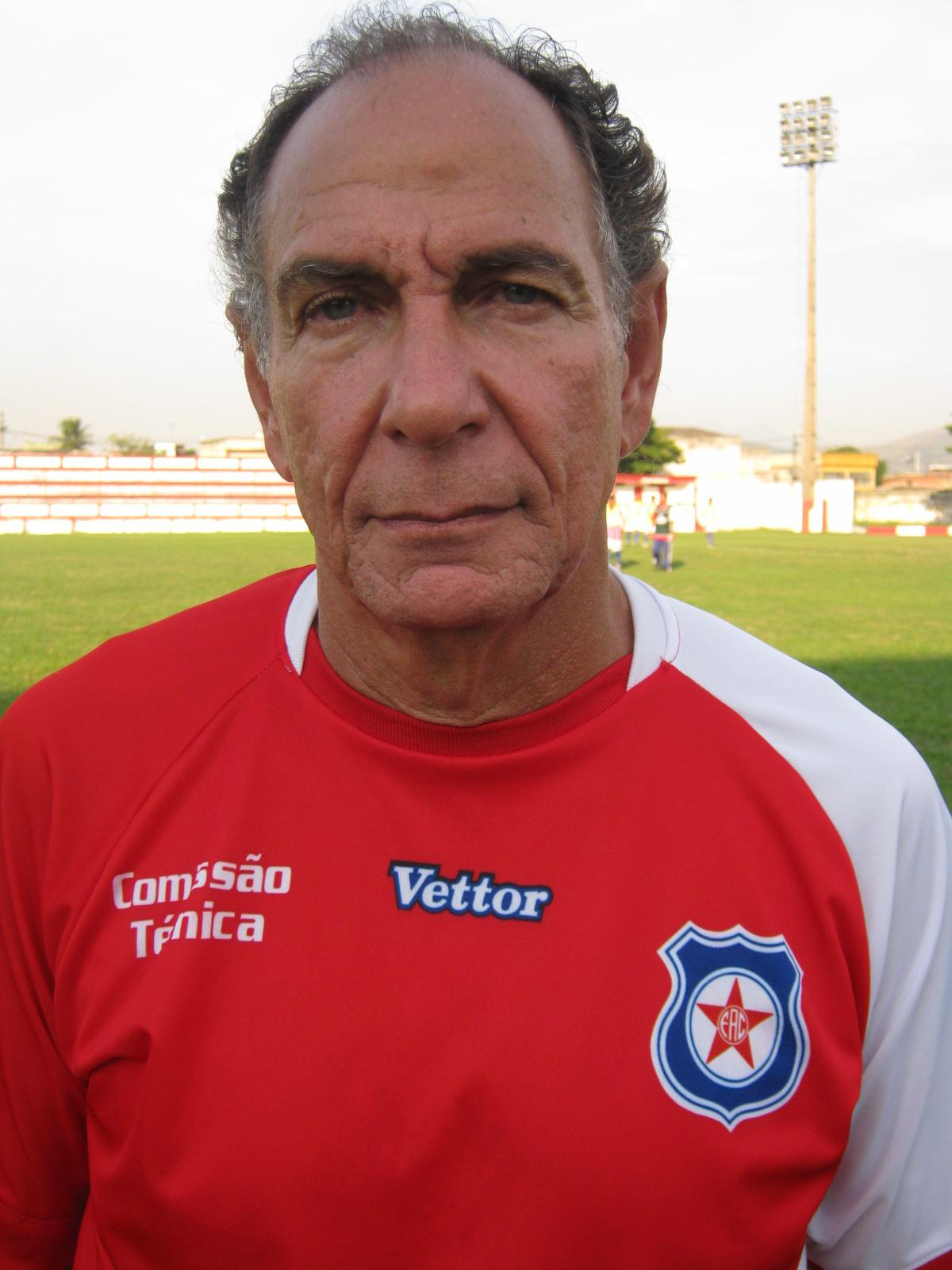

Personal information
- Full name: Gérson Rodrigues Andreotti
- Date of birth: October 19, 1953 (age 73)
- Place of birth: Rio de Janeiro, Brazil

Senior career*
Years	Team	Apps	(Gls)
1974	Fluminense		
1975	Olaria		
1975–1977	Atlético Paranaense		
1977–1980	América-SP		
1981–1982	São José		
1983	Juventus		
1984	Paulista		

Managerial career
- 1990–1994: Lousano Paulista
- 1995–1996: Caldense
- 1998–2002: Flamengo (technical assistant)
- 2002–2003: Brasiliense
- 2005: Marcílio Dias
- 2006: Goytacaz
- 2007: Brusque
- 2007: Metropolitano
- 2007: Marcílio Dias
- 2007: Goytacaz
- 2007–2008: Brasiliense
- 2009: Marcílio Dias
- 2010: São Cristóvão
- 2011–2013: Friburguense
- 2013: Macaé
- 2014–2018: Friburguense
- * Club domestic league appearances and goals

Gérson Rodrigues Andreotti known as Gérson Andreotti (born 19 October 1953), is a Brazilian football coach and former defensive midfielder. He is one of the best known former players and current head-coaches/managers in Brazil, having as footballer, acted in clubs as Fluminense FC, Atlético Paranaense, Olaria and América (SP). He exercised the function of coach, initially at Lousano Paulista, then as an assistant-tech for Zagallo and Evaristo de Macedo in Flamengo. He hanged around various clubs in Brazil, but it was in Friburguense, where he won more emphasis for having almost brought the team to the Campeonato Brasileiro Série C and the league Copa Rio. He was once contracted by Macaé in 2013, but eventually returned to the club of Friburguense.

== Honours ==
=== Player ===
Juventus

- Campeonato Brasileiro Série B: 1983

Ríver

- Campeonato Piauiense: 1973

=== Manager ===
Brasiliense

- Campeonato Brasileiro Série C: 2002
- Campeonato Brasiliense: 2008
