= Associação Desportiva Cabofriense =

Cabofriense
- Full name: Associação Desportiva Cabofriense
- Nickname: Tricolor
- Founded: November 15, 1955; 70 years ago (as A.A. Cabofriense); January 1, 1997; 29 years ago (as A.D. Cabofriense)
- Ground: Correão
- Capacity: 12.000
- Chairman: Valdemir da Silva Mendes
- Head coach: Luciano Quadros
- League: Campeonato Carioca Série A2
- 2025: Carioca Série A2, 7th of 12
| Home colors | Away colors |

Associação Desportiva Cabofriense, commonly known as Cabofriense, is a Brazilian professional association football club based in Cabo Frio, Rio de Janeiro. The team plays in Série D, the fourth tier of the Brazilian football league system, as well as in the Campeonato Carioca, the top tier of the Rio de Janeiro state football league.

== History ==
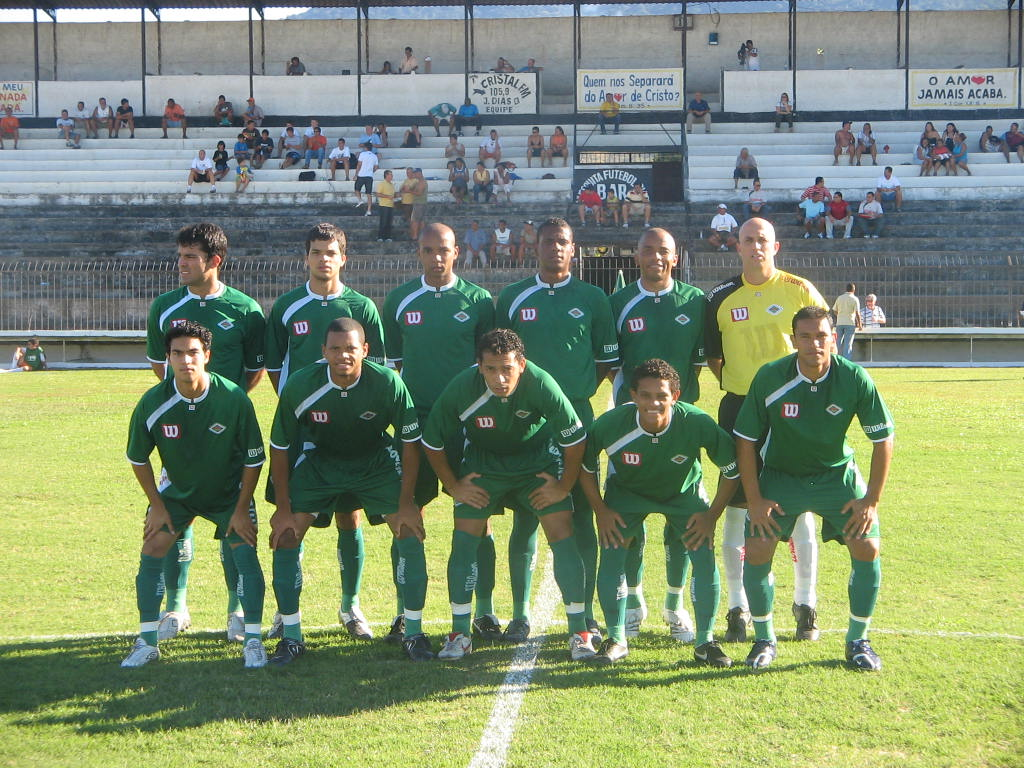
Team photo from the 2007 season

The club was founded on November 15, 1955, as Associação Atlética Cabofriense, and after the team retired from professional competitions in 1993, some of the club's former officials formed a new team in 1997, called Associação Desportiva Cabofriense. Associação Desportiva Cabofriense then changed its name to Cabo Frio Futebol Clube in 1999. In 2001, Cabo Frio changed its name back to Associação Desportiva Cabofriense.

== Honours ==
=== Official tournaments ===
State
| Competitions | Titles | Seasons |
|---|---|---|
| Campeonato Carioca Série A2 | 5 | 1986, 1998, 2002, 2010, 2013 |

=== Others tournaments ===
==== International ====
- Martinique International Tournament (1): 2003

==== State ====
- Taça Corcovado (1): 2013
- Torneio Interior (1): 2013

=== Runners-up ===
- Copa Rio (1): 2007
- Campeonato Carioca Série B1 (2): 1983, 1997

== Stadium ==
The club play its home games at Correão stadium. The stadium has a maximum capacity of 4,200 people.

== Mascot ==
The club's mascot is a marlin fish, named Espada ("sword" in Portuguese). According to Cabofriense's website, the marlin was chosen as a mascot because it represents strength, vigor, combativeness and technique.
