= 1981 in Brazilian football =

Football in Brazil
- Season: 1981

The following article presents a summary of the 1981 football (soccer) season in Brazil, which was the 80th season of competitive football in the country.

== Campeonato Brasileiro Série A ==
Quarterfinals

Team 1	Agg.	Team 2	1st leg	2nd leg
Vasco da Gama	0-0	Ponte Preta	0-0	0-0
Grêmio	3-0	Operário-MS	2-0	1-0
Internacional	0-3	São Paulo	0-1	0-2
Flamengo	1-3	Botafogo	0-0	1-3

Semifinals

Team 1	Agg.	Team 2	1st leg	2nd leg
Botafogo	3-3	São Paulo	1-0	2-3
Ponte Preta	3-3	Grêmio	2-3	1-0

Final

April 30, 1981

Grêmio	2–1	São Paulo

Olímpico

May 3, 1981

São Paulo	0–1	Grêmio

Morumbi

Grêmio declared as the Campeonato Brasileiro champions by aggregate score of 3-1.

== Campeonato Brasileiro Série B ==
Semifinals

Team 1	Agg.	Team 2	1st leg	2nd leg
Comercial	1-5	Guarani	1-2	1-3
Remo	5-7	Anapolina	2-3	3-4

Final

March 21, 1981

Anapolina	2–4	Guarani

March 27, 1981

Guarani	1–1	Anapolina

Guarani declared as the Campeonato Brasileiro Série B champions by aggregate score of 5-3.

=== Promotion ===
The first placed team in each one of the four groups in the second stage, which were Bahia, Náutico, Palmeiras and Uberaba, were promoted to the same season's first level's second stage.

== Campeonato Brasileiro Série C ==
Semifinal Group A

Pos	Team	Pld	W	D	L	GF	GA	GD	Pts
1	Olaria (A)	4	2	0	2	3	3	0	4
2	São Borja	4	1	2	1	4	3	+1	4
3	Dom Bosco	4	1	2	1	3	4	−1	4

(A) Advanced to the final

Semifinal Group B

Pos	Team	Pld	W	D	L	GF	GA	GD	Pts
1	Santo Amaro (A)	4	2	2	0	4	1	+3	6
2	Izabelense	4	1	1	2	4	5	−1	3
3	Guarani-MG	4	1	1	2	3	5	−2	3

(A) Advanced to the final

Final

April 25, 1981

Olaria	4–0	Santo Amaro-PE

Marechal Hermes

May 1, 1981

Santo Amaro-PE	1–0	Olaria

Arruda

Olaria declared as the Campeonato Brasileiro Série C champions by aggregate score of 4-1.

== State championship champions ==
State	Champion	State	Champion
Acre	Juventus-AC	Paraíba	Treze
Alagoas	CSA	Paraná	Londrina
Amapá	Macapá	Pernambuco	Sport Recife
Amazonas	Nacional	Piauí	River
Bahia	Bahia	Rio de Janeiro	Flamengo
Ceará	Ceará	Rio Grande do Norte	América-RN
Distrito Federal	Taguatinga	Rio Grande do Sul	Internacional
Espírito Santo	Desportiva	Rondônia	Moto Clube
Goiás	Goiás	Roraima	Atlético Roraima
Maranhão	Moto Club	Santa Catarina	Joinville
Mato Grosso	Mixto	São Paulo	São Paulo
Mato Grosso do Sul	Operário	Sergipe	Itabaiana
Minas Gerais	Atlético Mineiro	Tocantins	-
Pará	Paysandu		

== Youth competition champions ==
Competition	Champion
Copa São Paulo de Juniores	Ponte Preta

== Other competition champions ==
Competition	Champion
Taça Minas Gerais	Democrata-GV
Torneio Centro-Oeste	Mixto
Torneio de Integração da Amazônia	Juventus

== Brazilian clubs in international competitions ==
Team	Copa Libertadores 1981	Intercontinental Cup 1981
Atlético Mineiro	Group stage	N/A
Flamengo	Champions	Champions

== Brazil national team ==
The following table lists all the games played by the Brazil national football team in official competitions and friendly matches during 1981.

Date	Opposition	Result	Score	Brazil scorers	Competition
January 4, 1981	Argentina	D	1-1	Edevaldo	Mundialito
January 7, 1981	West Germany	W	4-1	Júnior, Toninho Cerezo, Serginho Chulapa, Zé Sérgio	Mundialito
January 10, 1981	Uruguay	L	1-2	Sócrates	Mundialito
February 1, 1981	Colombia	D	1-1	Serginho Chulapa	International Friendly
February 8, 1981	Venezuela	W	1-0	Zico	World Cup Qualifying
February 14, 1981	Ecuador	W	6-0	Reinaldo (2), Sócrates (2), Landeta (own goal), Zico	International Friendly
February 22, 1981	Bolivia	W	2-1	Sócrates, Reinaldo	World Cup Qualifying
March 14, 1981	Chile	W	2-1	Zico, Reinaldo	International Friendly
March 22, 1981	Bolivia	W	3-1	Zico (3)	World Cup Qualifying
March 29, 1981	Venezuela	W	5-0	Tita (2), Sócrates, Zico, Júnior	World Cup Qualifying
May 12, 1981	England	W	1-0	Zico	International Friendly
May 15, 1981	France	W	3-1	Zico, Reinaldo, Sócrates	International Friendly
May 19, 1981	West Germany	W	2-1	Toninho Cerezo, Júnior	International Friendly
July 8, 1981	Spain	W	1-0	Baltazar	International Friendly
July 26, 1981	Chile	D	0-0	-	International Friendly
September 23, 1981	(Republic of Ireland) League of Ireland XI	W	6-0	Éder, Roberto Cearense, Zico (4)	Exhibition game
October 28, 1981	Bulgaria	W	3-0	Roberto Dinamite, Zico, Leandro	International Friendly
