= Mario Riquelme =

Mario Riquelme may refer to:

- Mario Riquelme Muñoz (1928–2019), Chilean trade unionist and Communist politician
- Mario Riquelme Ponce (1914–1996), Chilean civil servant and Radical politician
- Mario Riquelme (footballer), played for SD Ibiza Islas Pitiusas

== See also ==
- Riquelme, Spanish surname
