= Copa João Havelange Group Green and White =

Copa João Havelange Group Green and White was one of the three groups of 2000 season's first stage of the Brazilian football league, named Copa João Havelange. It consists of 55 teams in 8 groups.

== Teams ==
=== Group Green ===
Club	City	Stadium	1999 seasons	2000 seasons
ASA	Arapiraca	Coaracy da Mata		(Alagoas) Campeonato Alagoano Champions
Atlético (GO)	Goiânia	Antônio Accioly	Série C First Round	(Goiás) Campeonato Goiano 9th place
Baré	Boa Vista	Canarinho		(Roraima) Campeonato Roraimense
Botafogo (PB)	João Pessoa	Almeidão	Série C Round of 16	(Paraíba) Campeonato Paraibano
Brasília	Brasília	Mané Garrincha		(Federal District (Brazil)) Campeonato Brasiliense Semifinalists
Camaçari	Camaçari	Armando Oliveira		(Bahia) Campeonato Baiano 4th place
Campinense	Campina Grande	Amigão		(Paraíba) Campeonato Paraibano Semifinalists
Central (PE)	Caruaru	Lacerdão		(Pernambuco) Campeonato Pernambucano 6th place
Comercial (MS)	Campo Grande	Morenão		(Mato Grosso do Sul) Campeonato Sul-Matogrossense Champions
Confiança	Aracaju	Batistão		(Sergipe) Campeonato Sergipano Third Stage
Corinthians (AL)	Maceió	Nelsão		(Alagoas) Campeonato Alagoano 3rd place
Dom Pedro II	Brasília	Adonir Guimarães	Série C First Round	(Federal District (Brazil)) Campeonato Brasiliense Semifinalists
Flamengo (PI)	Teresina	Albertão		(Piauí) Campeonato Piauiense
Genus	Porto Velho	Aluízio Ferreira		(Rondônia) Campeonato Rondoniense Runner-up
Goiânia	Goiânia	Olímpico Pedro Ludovico	Série C First Round	(Goiás) Campeonato Goiano 5th place
Interporto	Porto Nacional	General Sampaio		(Tocantins) Campeonato Tocantinense Runner-up
Juazeiro (BA)	Juazeiro	Adauto Morais		(Bahia) Campeonato Baiano
Moto Club	São Luís	Nhozinho Santos	Série C Round of 16	(Maranhão) Campeonato Maranhense Champions
Operário (MS)	Campo Grande	Morenão	Série C First Round	(Mato Grosso do Sul) Campeonato Sul-Matogrossense
Porto (PE)	Caruaru	Antônio Inácio de Souza		(Pernambuco) Campeonato Pernambucano 4th place
Potiguar	Mossoró	Nogueirão	Série C Round of 16	(Rio Grande do Norte) Campeonato Potiguar 6th place
Rio Branco (AC)	Rio Branco	José de Melo		(Acre (state)) Campeonato Acreano Champions
Rio Negro	Manaus	Carlos Zamith	Série C Round of 16	(Amazonas (Brazilian state)) Campeonato Amazonense Quarterfinalists
Sergipe	Aracaju	João Hora	Série C Quarterfinalists	(Sergipe) Campeonato Sergipano Third Stage
Tocantinópolis	Tocantinópolis	Ribeirão	Série C First Round	(Tocantins) Campeonato Tocantinense 5th place
Treze	Campina Grande	Amigão		(Paraíba) Campeonato Paraibano Champions
Tuna Luso	Belém	Souza	Série B 20th place	(Pará) Campeonato Paraense 5th place
Ypiranga	Macapá	Zerão		(Amapá) Campeonato Amapaense Quarterfinalists

=== Group White ===
Club	City	Stadium	1999 seasons	2000 seasons
Comercial (SP)	Ribeirão Preto	Palma Travassos		(São Paulo (state)) Campeonato Paulista Série A2 Quarterfinalists
Etti Jundiaí	Jundiaí	Jayme Cintra		(São Paulo (state)) Campeonato Paulista Série A2 Runners-up
Friburguense	Nova Friburgo	Eduardo Guinle		(Rio de Janeiro (state)) Campeonato Carioca 9th place
Internacional (SP)	Limeira	Major José Levy Sobrinho		(São Paulo (state)) Campeonato Paulista 11th Place
Internacional (SM)	Santa Maria	Baixada Melancólica		(Rio Grande do Sul) Campeonato Gaúcho 16th Place
Ipatinga	Ipatinga	Ipatingão		(Minas Gerais) Campeonato Mineiro 4th place
Ituano	Itu	Novelli Júnior		(São Paulo (state)) Campeonato Paulista Série A2 First stage
Juventus	São Paulo	Rua Javari	Série C Round of 16	(São Paulo (state)) Campeonato Paulista Série A2 Semifinalists
Madureira	Rio de Janeiro	Conselheiro Galvão		(Rio de Janeiro (state)) Campeonato Carioca 9th place
Malutrom	São José dos Pinhais	Pinhão		(Paraná (state)) Campeonato Paranaense 6th place
Matonense	Matão	Dr. Hudson Buck Ferreira		(São Paulo (state)) Campeonato Paulista 9th place
Mogi Mirim	Mogi Mirim	Papa João Paulo II		(São Paulo (state)) Campeonato Paulista 13th place
Nacional (SP)	São Paulo	Nicolau Alayon		(São Paulo (state)) Campeonato Paulista Série A3 Champion
Olaria	Rio de Janeiro	Rua Bariri		(Rio de Janeiro (state)) Campeonato Carioca 6th place
Olímpia	Olímpia	Maria Tereza Breda		(São Paulo (state)) Campeonato Paulista Série A3 First stage winners (São Paulo (state)) Campeonato Paulista Série A2 11th place
Portuguesa Santista	Santos	Ulrico Mursa		(São Paulo (state)) Campeonato Paulista 12th place
Rio Branco (ES)	Vitória	Kléber Andrade		(Espírito Santo) Campeonato Capixaba Semifinalists
Rio Branco (PR)	Paranaguá	Estradinha	Série C First Round	(Paraná (state)) Campeonato Paranaense Semifinalists
Rio Branco (SP)	Americana	Décio Vitta		(São Paulo (state)) Campeonato Paulista 8th place
Santo André	Santo André	Bruno José Daniel		(São Paulo (state)) Campeonato Paulista Série A2 Quarterfinalists
São Cristóvão	Rio de Janeiro	Figueira de Melo		(Rio de Janeiro (state)) Campeonato Carioca Série A2 Semifinalists
São José	São José dos Campos	Martins Pereira		(São Paulo (state)) Campeonato Paulista Série A2 Quarterfinalists
Uberlândia	Uberlândia	Parque do Sabiá		(Minas Gerais) Campeonato Mineiro 9th place
União	Rondonópolis	Luthero Lopes		(Mato Grosso) Campeonato Mato-Grossense 6th place
União Bandeirante	Bandeirantes	Comendador Luís Serafim Meneghel		(Paraná (state)) Campeonato Paranaense 7th place
União Barbarense	Santa Bárbara d'Oeste	Toca do Leão		(São Paulo (state)) Campeonato Paulista 10th place
Volta Redonda	Volta Redonda	Raulino de Oliveira	Série C First Round	(Rio de Janeiro (state)) Campeonato Carioca 11th place

== First round ==
=== Group A ===
Pos	Team	Pld	W	D	L	GF	GA	GD	Pts
1	Tuna Luso (PA)	12	8	2	2	25	15	+10	26
2	Central (PE)	12	7	1	4	16	15	+1	22
3	Moto Club (MA)	12	5	3	4	24	17	+7	18
4	Botafogo (PB)	12	5	2	5	22	17	+5	17
5	Porto (PE)	12	5	1	6	15	13	+2	16
6	Treze (PB)	12	5	1	6	16	17	−1	16
7	Potiguar (RN)	12	2	0	10	9	33	−24	6

Source: rsssf.com

=== Group B ===
Pos	Team	Pld	W	D	L	GF	GA	GD	Pts
1	Corinthians (AL)	12	8	3	1	16	8	+8	27
2	Juazeiro (BA)	12	7	2	3	15	9	+6	23
3	Confiança (SE)	12	5	3	4	10	11	−1	18
4	Sergipe (SE)	12	5	2	5	15	14	+1	17
5	ASA (AL)	12	4	3	5	11	13	−2	15
6	Camaçari (BA)	12	3	3	6	13	11	+2	12
7	Campinense (PB)	12	1	2	9	9	23	−14	5

Source: rsssf.com

=== Group C ===
Pos	Team	Pld	W	D	L	GF	GA	GD	Pts
1	Flamengo (PI)	12	7	1	4	18	11	+7	22
2	Ypiranga (AP)	12	6	2	4	23	19	+4	20
3	Tocantinópolis (TO)	12	6	1	5	16	14	+2	19
4	Rio Branco (AC)	12	5	3	4	20	16	+4	18
5	Baré (RR)	12	5	2	5	21	15	+6	17
6	Rio Negro (AM)	12	5	2	5	12	14	−2	17
7	Genus (RO)	12	2	1	9	16	37	−21	7

Source: rsssf.com

=== Group D ===
Pos	Team	Pld	W	D	L	GF	GA	GD	Pts
1	Operário (MS)	10	5	2	3	14	12	+2	17
2	Dom Pedro II (DF)	10	4	3	3	11	9	+2	15
3	Atlético (GO)	10	4	3	3	9	9	0	15
4	Goiânia (GO)	10	3	4	3	15	14	+1	13
5	Comercial (MS)	10	3	2	5	9	10	−1	11
6	Brasília (DF)	10	3	2	5	10	14	−4	11
–	Interporto (TO)	0	0	0	0	0	0	0	0

Source: rsssf.com

=== Group E ===
Pos	Team	Pld	W	D	L	GF	GA	GD	Pts
1	Rio Branco-SP	10	6	3	1	23	10	+13	21
2	Juventus	10	6	3	1	20	10	+10	21
3	Uberlândia	10	5	3	2	15	14	+1	18
4	Nacional-SP	10	4	1	5	13	21	−8	13
5	Volta Redonda	10	2	3	5	10	14	−4	9
6	São José	10	0	1	9	8	20	−12	1
–	Rio Branco-ES	0	0	0	0	0	0	0	0

Source: rsssf.com

=== Group F ===
Pos	Team	Pld	W	D	L	GF	GA	GD	Pts
1	Etti Jundiaí	12	10	1	1	40	8	+32	31
2	Malutrom	12	6	4	2	21	15	+6	22
3	União Bandeirante	12	4	4	4	17	23	−6	16
4	Madureira	12	3	5	4	20	15	+5	14
5	Internacional de Limeira	12	3	4	5	18	17	+1	13
6	União Rondonópolis	12	3	1	8	12	28	−16	10
7	Comercial-SP	12	3	1	8	9	31	−22	10

Source: rsssf.com

=== Group G ===
Pos	Team	Pld	W	D	L	GF	GA	GD	Pts
1	Olímpia	12	5	5	2	16	11	+5	20
2	Friburguense	12	4	6	2	11	10	+1	18
3	Matonense	12	4	5	3	15	13	+2	17
4	São Cristóvão	12	4	4	4	13	16	−3	16
5	Mogi Mirim	12	3	7	2	23	17	+6	16
6	Ipatinga	12	3	4	5	16	20	−4	13
7	União Barbarense	12	2	3	7	12	19	−7	9

Source: rsssf.com

=== Group H ===
Pos	Team	Pld	W	D	L	GF	GA	GD	Pts
1	Rio Branco-PR	10	6	3	1	16	8	+8	21
2	Portuguesa Santista	10	5	4	1	19	9	+10	19
3	Santo André	10	3	3	4	11	14	−3	12
4	Ituano	10	3	2	5	10	10	0	11
5	Olaria	10	3	2	5	9	10	−1	11
6	Internacional-SM	10	2	2	6	7	21	−14	8

Source: rsssf.com

== Second round ==
=== Group 1 ===
Pos	Team	Pld	W	D	L	GF	GA	GD	Pts
1	Juazeiro	6	4	0	2	13	7	+6	12
2	Tuna Luso	6	4	0	2	8	9	−1	12
3	Ypiranga-AP	6	3	0	3	10	10	0	9
4	Atlético-GO	6	1	0	5	7	12	−5	3

Source: rsssf.com

=== Group 2 ===
Pos	Team	Pld	W	D	L	GF	GA	GD	Pts
1	Central	6	3	1	2	9	7	+2	10
2	Tocantinópolis	6	3	0	3	8	10	−2	9
3	Corinthians-AL	6	2	2	2	11	9	+2	8
4	Dom Pedro II	6	1	3	2	6	8	−2	6

Source: rsssf.com

=== Group 3 ===
Pos	Team	Pld	W	D	L	GF	GA	GD	Pts
1	Moto Club	6	3	2	1	8	8	0	11
2	Operário-MS	6	2	2	2	8	12	−4	8
3	Flamengo-PI	6	2	1	3	13	11	+2	7
4	Confiança	6	2	1	3	11	9	+2	7

Source: rsssf.com

=== Group 4 ===
Pos	Team	Pld	W	D	L	GF	GA	GD	Pts
1	Malutrom	6	4	2	0	10	3	+7	14
2	Rio Branco-SP	6	3	0	3	8	6	+2	9
3	Friburguense	6	1	2	3	4	6	−2	5
4	Santo André	6	1	2	3	5	12	−7	5

Source: rsssf.com

=== Group 5 ===
Pos	Team	Pld	W	D	L	GF	GA	GD	Pts
1	Etti Jundiaí	6	4	1	1	13	7	+6	13
2	Portuguesa Santista	6	2	2	2	7	7	0	8
3	Juventus	6	2	1	3	11	7	+4	7
4	Matonense	6	1	2	3	4	14	−10	5

Source: rsssf.com

=== Group 6 ===
Pos	Team	Pld	W	D	L	GF	GA	GD	Pts
1	Uberlândia	6	3	2	1	11	7	+4	11
2	Olímpia	6	3	2	1	7	5	+2	11
3	Rio Branco-PR	6	3	2	1	6	5	+1	11
4	União Bandeirante	6	0	0	6	5	12	−7	0

Source: rsssf.com

== Third round ==
=== Group A ===
Pos	Team	Pld	W	D	L	GF	GA	GD	Pts
1	Uberlândia (MG)	6	3	2	1	10	4	+6	11
2	Juazeiro (BA)	6	3	2	1	6	4	+2	11
3	Olímpia (SP)	6	2	2	2	8	5	+3	8
4	Central (PE)	6	0	2	4	3	14	−11	2

Source: rsssf.com

=== Group B ===
Pos	Team	Pld	W	D	L	GF	GA	GD	Pts
1	Malutrom (PR)	6	3	2	1	12	11	+1	11
2	Tuna Luso (PA)	6	3	0	3	9	11	−2	9
3	Etti Jundiaí (SP)	6	2	2	2	15	6	+9	8
4	Moto Club (MA)	6	1	2	3	9	17	−8	5

Source: rsssf.com

=== Final ===
Team 1	Agg.	Team 2	1st leg	2nd leg
Uberlândia (MG)	3–4	Malutrom (PR)	1–1	2–3
