= Amauri Knevitz =

Brazilian footballer

Personal information
- Date of birth: 8 April 1959 (age 67)
- Place of birth: Porto Alegre, Brazil
- Position: Defender

Senior career*
Years	Team	Apps	(Gls)
1980	Internacional		
1981	Comercial-SP		
1982	Caxias		
1982	Operário-MS		
1983–1985	Brasil de Pelotas		
1985–1986	Atlético Paranaense		
1987	Botafogo-SP		
1987	Vitória		
1988	Náutico		
1989	Aimoré		
1990	Bandeirante		
1991	Lajeadense		
1991	Juventude		
1992	Novo Hamburgo		
1993	Garibaldi		
1994	São Paulo-RS		

Managerial career
- 1999–2000: Malutron
- 2001: Figueirense
- 2002: Brasil de Pelotas
- 2003: CA Lages
- 2003: Nacional-AM
- 2005: J. Malucelli
- 2007: Paranavaí
- 2008: São Caetano
- 2009: Ituiutaba
- 2009: Ypiranga-RS
- 2009–2010: Noroeste
- 2010: CRB
- 2010–2011: Corinthians-PR
- 2011: Noroeste
- 2011: Concórdia
- 2012: Noroeste
- 2013: Rio Branco-PR
- 2014: Glória
- 2015: Rio Branco-PR
- 2015–2016: Três Passos
- 2017: Comercial-SP
- 2020: Rio Branco-PR
- * Club domestic league appearances and goals

Amauri Knevitz (born 8 April 1959) is a Brazilian former professional footballer and manager, who played as a defender.

== Playing career ==
As a player, Amauri had a discreet career, highlighted by spells at Brasil de Pelotas and Athletico Paranaense.

== Managerial career ==
As coach, Knevitz surprised by winning the title of the blue and white modules of the Copa João Havelange (equivalent to the Campeonato Brasileiro Série C) in 2000, in addition to the title with Paranavaí in the 2007 Campeonato Paranaense. He also coached Figueirense, Brasil de Pelotas, São Caetano among others. His last job was in Rio Branco-PR in 2020.

He revealed that the great supporter of his career as a coach was Luiz Felipe Scolari, who trained him as a player.

== Honours ==
=== Manager ===
J. Malucelli

- Copa João Havelange Group Green and White: 2000

Paranavaí

- Campeonato Paranaense: 2007
