= Riquelme =

Riquelme is a Spanish surname that may refer to:

== People ==
=== Given name ===
- Riquelme (footballer, born April 2002), full name Riquelme Carvalho Araújo Viana, Brazilian football left-back for Vasco da Gama
- Riquelme (footballer, born October 2002), full name Riquelme Rodrigues Mendes, Brazilian football midfielder for DAC Dunajská Streda
- Riquelme (footballer, born 2005), full name Diogo Riquelme Rivas do Nascimento, Brazilian football midfielder for Athletico Paranaense
- Riquelme (footballer, born January 2006), full name Riquelme Reis de Almeida de Jesus dos Santos, Brazilian football midfielder for FC Liefering
- Riquelme (footballer, born August 2006), full name Riquelme Freitas dos Santos, Brazilian football midfielder for Grêmio
- Riquelme (footballer, born January 2007), full name Riquelme Felipe da Silva de Oliveira, Brazilian football defender for Sport Recife
- Riquelme Fillipi (born 2006), full name Riquelme Fillipi Marinho de Souza, Brazilian football winger for Palmeiras
- Riquelme Felipe (born 2007), full name Riquelme Felipe Silva de Almeida, Brazilian football midfielder for Fluminense

=== Surname ===
- Alba Riquelme (born 1991), Paraguayan fashion model
- Blas Riquelme (1929–2012), Paraguayan politician and businessman
- Carlos Riquelme (1914–1990), Mexican film actor
- Daniel Riquelme (1857–1912), Chilean writer
- Edson Riquelme (born 1985), Chilean footballer
- Isabel Riquelme (1758–1839), Chilean mother of independence leader Bernardo O'Higgins
- Joaquín Riquelme García (born 1983), Spanish viola player
- Juan Riquelme (1616–1671), Spanish bishop
- Juan Román Riquelme (born 1978), Argentine footballer
- Keren Riquelme, Puerto Rican politician
- Larissa Riquelme (born 1985), Paraguayan lingerie model
- Manuel Riquelme (1772–1857), Chilean military officer
- Manuel Riquelme (1912-unknown), Chilean Olympic cyclist
- Marcos Riquelme (born 1988), Argentine footballer
- Nemoroso Riquelme (1906-unknown), Chilean Olympic fencer
- Rafael Riquelme (born 1995), Mexican footballer
- Rodrigo Riquelme (born 1984), Paraguayan footballer
- Rodrigo Riquelme (born 2000), Spanish footballer

== Other uses ==
- ARP Adolfo Riquelme, a gunboat in the Paraguayan Navy, later Tacuary
- Riquelme Point, a geographical point in the South Shetland Islands
