= 1981 Campeonato Brasileiro Série C =

Campeonato Brasileiro Série C
- Season: 1981
- Champions: Olaria (1st title)
- Promoted: Olaria
- Matches: 50
- Goals: 108 (2.16 per match)
- Top goalscorer: 5 goals: Müller (São Borja); Fabinho (Santo Amaro)
- Biggest home win: Piauí 5-0 Moto Club (March 15, 1981)

The 1981 Campeonato Brasileiro Série C, officially, the Taça de Bronze 1981, was the first edition of the Campeonato Brasileiro Série C.The championship was performed by 24 clubs. The first phase was disputed by a two-legged knockout tournament, in which the winners qualified to the Second phase, that was disputed in the same way. The winners qualified to the second phase, in which the six teams were divided into two groups of tree teams, that played against the teams of their own groups twice.the first-placed teams of each group qualified to the finals. The winner qualified to the Taça de Prata of the following year.

== First stage ==
Team 1	Agg.	Team 2	1st leg	2nd leg
Atlético de Alagoinhas	0–0	Capelense	0–0	0–0
Corumbaense	3–4	Dom Bosco	0–1	3–3
Santo Amaro	4–3	Auto Esporte-PB	1–0	3–3
Matsubara	0-1	Figueirense	0-1	0-0
Izabelense	4–4	América-AM	2–0	2–4
Colatina	2-4	Olaria	1–3	1–1
São Borja	3–1	Joaçaba	0–0	3–1
Baraúnas	4-1	Icasa	1–0	3-1
Taguatinga	1–3	Itumbiara	1–0	3–0
Guarani-MG	3-1	Sergipe	1-0	2-1
Moto Club	1-5	Piauí	1-0	0-5
Madureira	2-5	Paranavaí	1–0	1-5

== Second phase ==
Team 1	Agg.	Team 2	1st leg	2nd leg
Itumbiara	2–4	Dom Bosco	1–3	1–1
Santo Amaro	2–1	Baraúnas	1–1	1–0
Olaria	3-0	Paranavaí	2–0	1-0
Atlético de Alagoinhas	3–3	Guarani-MG	2–1	1–2
Figueirense	1-3	São Borja	1-0	0-3
Izabelense	1–0	Piauí	1–0	0–0

== Third phase ==
=== Group A ===
Pos	Team	Pld	W	D	L	GF	GA	GD	Pts
1	Olaria (A)	4	2	0	2	3	3	0	4
2	São Borja	4	1	2	1	4	3	+1	4
3	Dom Bosco	4	1	2	1	3	4	−1	4

(A) Advanced to the final

=== Group B ===
Pos	Team	Pld	W	D	L	GF	GA	GD	Pts
1	Santo Amaro (A)	4	2	2	0	4	1	+3	6
2	Izabelense	4	1	1	2	4	5	−1	3
3	Guarani-MG	4	1	1	2	3	5	−2	3

(A) Advanced to the final

== Finals ==
=== First leg ===
25 April 1981

Olaria (Rio de Janeiro (state))	4 – 0	(Pernambuco) Santo Amaro
Chiquinho Carioca 13'; Zé Ica 59'; Leandro 68', 70'

Marechal Hermes, Rio de Janeiro (RJ)
Referee: (Bahia) Nei Andrade Maia

=== Second leg ===
1 May 1981

Santo Amaro (Pernambuco)	1 – 0	(Rio de Janeiro (state)) Olaria
Derivaldo 80'

Arruda, Recife (PE)
Referee: (Ceará) José Leandro Serpa

== Sources ==
- RSSSF
