= Luketa =

Brazilian footballer

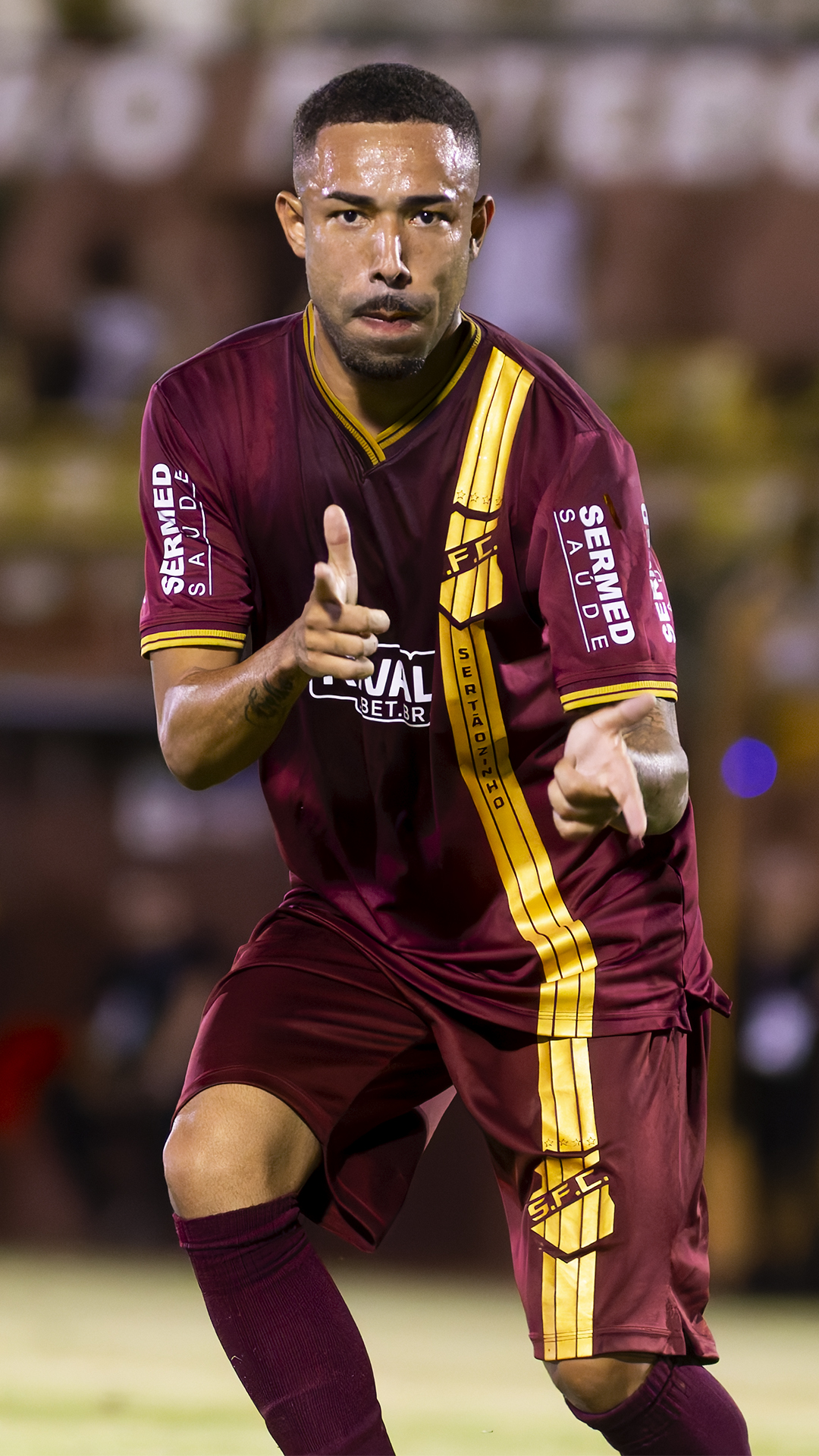
- Luketa with Sertãozinho in 2026

Personal information
- Full name: Lucas Henrique Luciano
- Date of birth: 6 March 1999 (age 27)
- Place of birth: Ribeirão Preto, Brazil
- Height: 1.77 m (5 ft 10 in)
- Position: Forward

Team information
- Current team: Sertãozinho

Youth career
- 2014: Batatais
- 2015–2017: Comercial-SP
- 2018–2020: Botafogo-SP

Senior career*
Years	Team	Apps	(Gls)
2016–2017	Comercial-SP	0	(0)
2018–2022	Botafogo-SP	58	(5)
2023	Comercial-SP	7	(0)
2024	Desportivo Brasil	15	(1)
2025	Rio Branco-SP	15	(4)
2025	Blumenau	10	(3)
2026–	Sertãozinho	19	(9)
- * Club domestic league appearances and goals as of 22 April 2026

Lucas Henrique Luciano (born 6 March 1999), commonly known as Luketa, is a Brazilian professional footballer who plays as a forward for Sertãozinho.

== Career ==
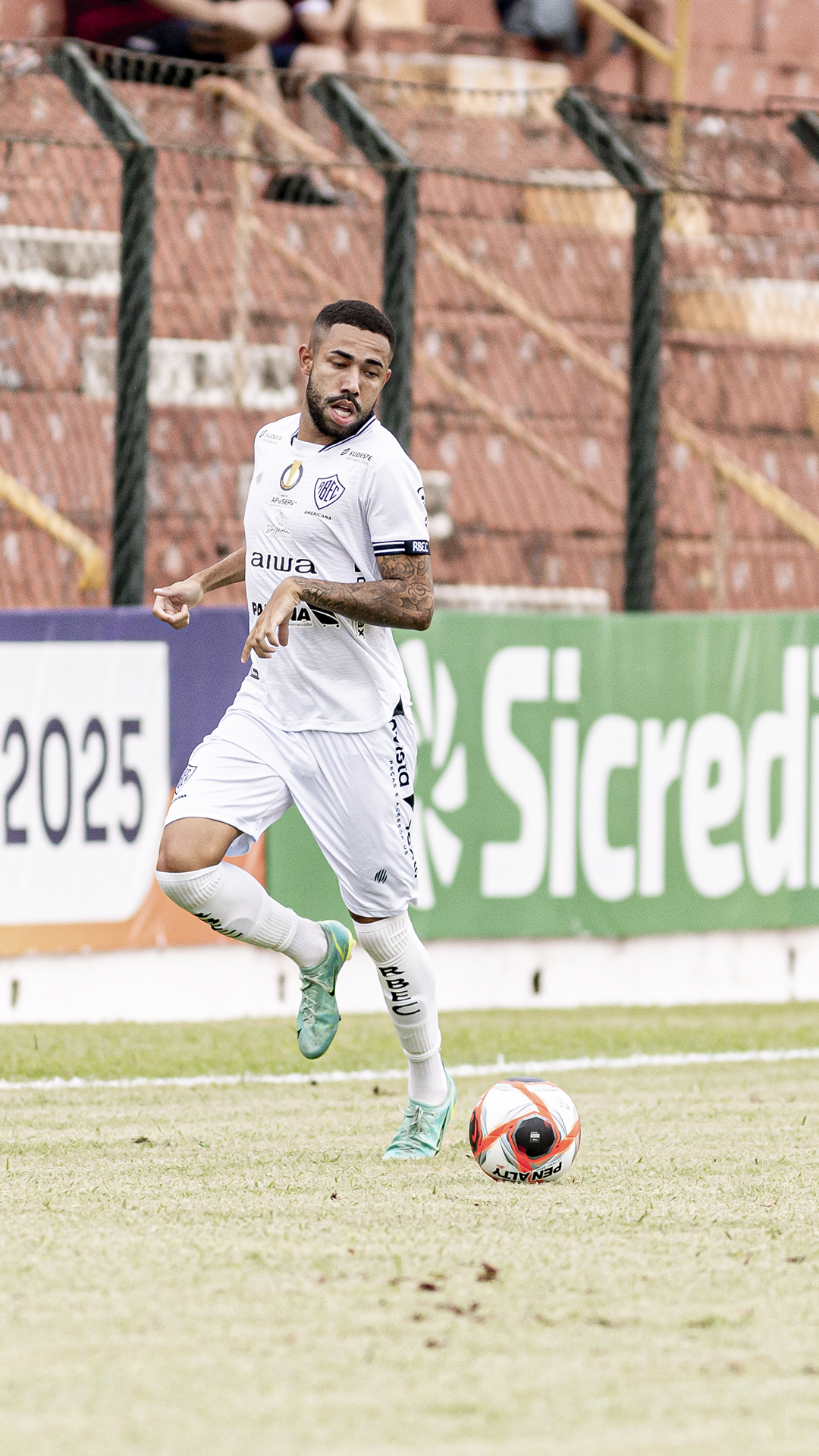
Luketa playing for Rio Branco-SP in 2025

Born in Ribeirão Preto, Luketa began his career in the youth ranks of clubs in the region such as Batatais, Botafogo, and Comercial. He played professionally for the city rivals, as well as Desportivo Brasil, Rio Branco, and Blumenau, in addition to passing a trial at Borussia Monchengladbach, when he didn't stay with the team due to adaptation problems. In 2026, he stood out for the goals he scored while playing for Sertãozinho in the Campeonato Paulista Série A2.

== Style of play ==
During his goal-scoring spell, Luketa said he prefers playing as a winger rather than a striker. Even so, he considers Ronaldo Nazário his great idol and inspiration.

== Career statistics ==
As of 8 April 2026

Appearances and goals by club, season and competition
Club	Season	League			State League		National cup		Other		Total	
Club	Season	Division	Apps	Goals	Apps	Goals	Apps	Goals	Apps	Goals	Apps	Goals
Comercial-SP	2016	Paulista A3	—		—		—		2 (Note: Appearances in Copa Paulista)	0	2	0
Botafogo-SP	2020	Série B	19	0	6	1	—		1	0	26	1
Botafogo-SP	2021	Série C	11	0	10	3	—		7	0	28	3
Botafogo-SP	2022	Série C	6	1	6	0	1	0	8	0	21	1
Botafogo-SP	Career total		36	1	22	4	1	0	16	0	75	5
Comercial-SP	2023	Paulista A2	—		7	0	—		—		7	0
Desportivo Brasil	2024	Paulista A3	—		15	1	—		—		15	1
Rio Branco-SP	2025	Paulista A3	—		15	4	—		—		15	4
Blumenau	2025	Catarinense Série B	—		10	3	—		9 (Note: Appearances in Copa Santa Catarina)	2	19	5
Sertãozinho	2026	Paulista A2	—		19	9	—		—		19	9
Career total			36	1	88	21	1	0	27	2	152	24
