= Atlético Clube Izabelense =

Izabelense
- Full name: Atlético Clube Izabelense
- Nickname(s): Frangão da Estrada
- Founded: April 26, 1924
- Ground: Estádio Edílson Abreu, Santa Isabel do Pará, Pará state, Brazil
- Capacity: 3,000
| Home colors | Away colors |

Atlético Clube Izabelense, commonly known as Izabelense, is a Brazilian football club based in Santa Isabel do Pará, Pará state. It competed in the Série C twice.

== History ==
The club was founded on April 26, 1924. It competed in the Série C in 1981, when it was eliminated in the Third Stage of the competition, and in 1992, when it was eliminated in the First Stage.

== Stadium ==
Atlético Clube Izabelense plays its home games at Estádio Edílson Abreu. The stadium has a maximum capacity of 3,000 people.
