= Sertãozinho Futebol Clube =

Sertãozinho
- Full name: Sertãozinho Futebol Clube
- Nickname: Touro dos Canaviais
- Founded: 6 August 1944; 81 years ago
- Ground: Frederico Dalmaso
- Capacity: 15,074
- President: Antônio Aparecido Savegnago
- Head coach: Ruy Scarpino
- League: Campeonato Paulista Série A2
- 2025: Paulista Série A3, 1st of 16 (champions)
Home colors	Away colors

Sertãozinho Futebol Clube, commonly referred to as Sertãozinho, is a professional association football club based in Sertãozinho, São Paulo, Brazil. The team competes in Campeonato Paulista Série A2, the second tier of the São Paulo state football league.

== History ==
On August 6, 1944, the club was founded by a group of sportsmen. Sertãozinho's first president was Enéas Sílvio Bordin.

Between 1944 and 1969, the club only disputed amateur competitions, like Liga Ribeirãopretana de Futebol (Ribeirão Preto Football League) in the 1950s. At that time, Sertãozinho's greatest rival was Mogiana.

In 1963, the club closed its football section. In 1969, the football section was reopened, using mostly São Paulinho Futebol Clube players.

In 1971, Sertãozinho won its first title, the Campeonato Paulista Third Level, beating Rio Claro in the final. The club was thus promoted to the following year's second level.

In 2004, the club won again the Campeonato Paulista Third Level, beating Mirassol in the final 3–0.

In 2007, Sertãozinho disputed the Campeonato Paulista top level for the first time. Its first game was against São Paulo Futebol Clube, at Frederico Dalmaso stadium. São Paulo won 3–1.

== Honours ==
=== Official tournaments ===
State
Competitions	Titles	Seasons
Campeonato Paulista Série A3	4	1971, 2004, 2016, 2025

- record

=== Runners-up ===
- Copa Paulista (2): 1980, 1985
- Campeonato Paulista Série A2 (1): 2006
- Campeonato Paulista Série A3 (2): 1970, 1989
- Campeonato Paulista Série A4 (1): 2001

== Stadium ==
Sertãozinho's home stadium is Estádio Frederico Dalmaso, nicknamed Fredericão, meaning Big Frederico, built in 1968 and with a maximum capacity of 15,074 people.

The club also trains at a training ground named Centro de Treinamento Frederico Dalmazo.

== Club colors ==
White and grenadine red are the club's official colors.

== Mascot and nickname ==
Sertãozinho's mascot is a bull, named Touro dos Canaviais, which means Sugar Cane Plantations Bull. The bull was chosen after the club played against Barretos, whose mascot is a bull. Commander Alcídio Balbo was the mascot's creator.

The club is also nicknamed Touro dos Canavais.

=== First-team squad ===
As of 15 April 2026

Note: Flags indicate national team as defined under FIFA eligibility rules; some limited exceptions apply. Players may hold more than one non-FIFA nationality.

No.	Pos.	Nation	Player
1	GK	BRA	Gabriel Bubniack
2	DF	BRA	Rodrigo
3	DF	BRA	Bruno Santos
4	DF	BRA	Luizão
5	MF	BRA	Riquelme
6	DF	POR	Hélder Sá
7	MF	BRA	Vinicios
8	MF	BRA	Daniel Bonassa
9	FW	BRA	Luketa
10	MF	BRA	Matheus Prado
11	FW	BRA	Jefinho
12	GK	BRA	Rennan Souza de Lucca
13	DF	BRA	Fábio Santos

No.	Pos.	Nation	Player
14	MF	BRA	João Henrique
15	MF	BRA	Gustavo Lacerda
16	FW	BRA	Kauan Moreira
17	FW	BRA	Dyego Luis
18	DF	BRA	Moreira
22	FW	BRA	Lorran
24	DF	BRA	Fabio Souza
—	FW	BRA	Kauan Cordeiro
—	FW	BRA	Keninho
—	DF	BRA	Marco Gabriel
—	FW	BRA	Adiel
—	MF	BRA	Tenner
—	DF	BRA	Matheus Barbosa

== Anthem ==
The club's official anthem lyrics authors are Giuliano Marcos Sabino, Florisvaldo and Lucio de Freias, and the music author is only Giuliano Marcos Sabino.
