= Ronaldo Capixaba =

Brazilian footballer

Personal information
- Full name: Ronaldo Rosa dos Santos
- Date of birth: 23 November 1983 (age 42)
- Place of birth: Boa Esperança, Brazil
- Height: 1.79 m (5 ft 10 in)
- Position: Forward

Senior career*
Years	Team	Apps	(Gls)
2005	Império Toledo		
2006	Juventus-SC		
2007	Rio Branco-PR		
2008	São Luiz		
2008	Brasil de Pelotas		
2008	ABC		
2009	São Luiz		
2009	Campinense		
2009	ABC		
2009–2010	Criciúma		
2010	Botafogo-PB		
2010	Novo Hamburgo		
2011	Lajeadense		
2011	Joinville		
2012	Avaí		
2013	Chapecoense		
2013–2014	São Luiz		
2014	Estrela do Norte		
2014	Vitória-ES		
2015	Marcílio Dias		
2015–2016	Espírito Santo		
2017	Serra		
- * Club domestic league appearances and goals as of 12 March 2024

Ronaldo Rosa dos Santos (born 23 November 1983), better known as Ronaldo Capixaba, is a Brazilian former professional footballer who played as a forward.

== Career ==
Born in Boa Esperança, Espírito Santo, Ronaldo Capixaba played most of his early career for teams in the southern region of Brazil. At Joinville in 2011 he reached his peak, becoming champion and top scorer in Brasileiro Série C that season. He also played for teams from his home state such as Vitória FC, and ended his career at Serra in 2017.

== Honours ==
Joinville

- Campeonato Brasileiro Série C: 2011
- Copa Santa Catarina: 2011

Avaí

- Campeonato Catarinense: 2012

Espírito Santo FC

- Copa ES: 2015

Serra

- Campeonato Capixaba Série B: 2017

Individual

- 2011 Campeonato Brasileiro Série C top scorer: 11 goals
