= Olímpia Futebol Clube =

Olímpia FC
- Full name: Olímpia Futebol Clube
- Nickname: OFC
- Founded: December 5, 1946 (79 years ago)
- Ground: Estádio Maria Tereza Breda
- Capacity: 15,000
- President: Valter Joaquim Bitencourt
- Head coach: Zé Humberto
- League: Campeonato Paulista Segunda Divisão
- 2022: Paulistão A3, 16th of 16 (relegated)
- Website: www.olimpiafutebolclube.com
Home colors	Away colors

Olímpia Futebol Clube, commonly referred to as Olímpia, is a Brazilian professional association football club based in Olímpia, São Paulo. The team competes in the Campeonato Paulista Segunda Divisão, the fourth tier of the São Paulo state football league.

They competed in the Série A once.

The club's home colours are blue and white and the team mascot is a rooster.

== History ==
The club was founded on December 5, 1946. Dom Pedro competed in the 2000 edition of the Série A, named Copa João Havelange. The club participated in the White Group, reaching the Third Stage of the competition. They won the Campeonato Paulista Série A2 in 1990, and the Campeonato Paulista Série A3 in 2000 and in 2007.

== Honours ==
- Campeonato Paulista Série A2
  - Champions (1): 1990
- Campeonato Paulista Série A3
  - Champions (1): 2007

== Stadium ==
Olímpia Futebol Clube play their home games at Estádio Tereza Breda. The stadium has a maximum capacity of 15,022 people.
