= 1992 Campeonato Brasileiro Série C =

Campeonato Brasileiro Série C
- Season: 1992
- Champions: Tuna Luso
- Promoted: none
- Matches played: 122
- Goals scored: 253 (2.07 per match)
- Top goalscorer: Jorge Veras (Fortaleza), 9 goals
- Biggest home win: Fluminense de Feira 5–0 Sergipe (19 April)

The Campeonato Brasileiro Série C 1992, known as the Divisão Classificatória, was a football series played from 22 March to 13 June 1992. It was the third level of the Brazilian National League.

Initially scheduled with 25 clubs, the Brazilian Football Confederation announced the participation of 42 teams, but stated that they would not subside the costs of traveling and lodging. After this, several clubs withdrawn from the competition, which ended up with only 31 teams.

At the end of the tournament, none of the clubs were promoted as the Brazilian Football Confederation did not establish a Série C nor a Série B for the 1993 campaign.

== First phase ==
=== Group 1 ===
Pos	Team	Pld	W	D	L	GF	GA	GD	Pts	Qualification	NAC	RNE	MAC	ATL	JPA
1	(Amazonas (Brazilian state)) Nacional	8	5	2	1	8	2	+6	12	Advance to Second phase		0–1	0–0	0–0	1–0
2	(Amazonas (Brazilian state)) Rio Negro	8	3	3	2	9	6	+3	9		0–2		2–2	1–1	4–0
3	(Amapá) Macapá	8	1	6	1	7	7	0	8		0–2	0–0		0–0	2–0
4	(Acre (state)) Atlético Acreano	8	1	4	3	4	5	−1	6		1–2	0–1	0–0		0–1
5	(Rondônia) Ji-Paraná	8	2	1	5	5	13	−8	5		0–1	1–0	3–3	0–2	

=== Group 2 ===
Pos	Team	Pld	W	D	L	GF	GA	GD	Pts	Qualification	TUN	MOT	SAM	IZA	FLA
1	(Pará) Tuna Luso	8	6	2	0	11	2	+9	14	Advance to Second phase		1–0	3–0	3–1	1–0
2	(Maranhão) Moto Club	8	4	2	2	8	6	+2	10		0–0		1–0	0–2	2–0
3	(Maranhão) Sampaio Corrêa	8	1	4	3	5	9	−4	6		0–1	0–0		1–1	2–1
4	(Pará) Izabelense	8	1	3	4	11	14	−3	5		0–1	3–4	2–2		1–1
5	(Piauí) Flamengo	8	1	3	4	5	9	−4	5		1–1	0–1	0–0	2–1	

=== Group 3 ===
Pos	Team	Pld	W	D	L	GF	GA	GD	Pts	Qualification	AUT	CRB	VIT	FER	TRE
1	(Paraíba) Auto Esporte	8	4	3	1	12	6	+6	11	Advance to Second phase		1–0	1–1	2–0	1–1
2	(Alagoas) CRB	8	4	2	2	11	7	+4	10		1–0		1–1	4–2	3–0
3	(Pernambuco) Vitória	8	3	3	2	11	10	+1	9		1–3	3–1		2–1	2–1
4	(Ceará) Ferroviário	8	3	1	4	12	14	−2	7		1–1	0–1	1–0		5–3
5	(Paraíba) Treze	8	0	3	5	8	17	−9	3		1–3	0–0	1–1	1–2	

=== Group 4 ===
Pos	Team	Pld	W	D	L	GF	GA	GD	Pts	Qualification	FLU	CAT	ASA	SER
1	(Bahia) Fluminense de Feira	6	3	3	0	13	5	+8	9	Advance to Second phase		1–1	1–1	5–0
2	(Bahia) Catuense	6	2	3	1	4	4	0	7		0–2		1–0	1–0
3	(Alagoas) ASA	6	1	3	2	4	5	−1	5		1–2	0–0		1–0
4	Sergipe	6	0	3	3	4	11	−7	3		2–2	1–1	1–1	

=== Group 5 ===
Pos	Team	Pld	W	D	L	GF	GA	GD	Pts	Qualification	RPA	ATL	GUA	TIR
1	(Espírito Santo) Rio Pardo	6	2	4	0	6	3	+3	8	Advance to Second phase		1–1	0–0	2–0
2	(Goiás) Atlético Goianiense	6	2	3	1	6	3	+3	7		1–1		0–0	3–0
3	(Federal District (Brazil)) Guará	6	2	3	1	4	3	+1	7		1–1	1–0		1–0
4	(Federal District (Brazil)) Tiradentes	6	1	0	5	2	9	−7	2		0–1	0–1	2–1	

=== Group 6 ===
Pos	Team	Pld	W	D	L	GF	GA	GD	Pts	Qualification	MAT	SBE	MAR	RBR
1	(Paraná (state)) Matsubara	6	4	1	1	12	7	+5	9	Advance to Second phase		3–0	3–1	2–1
2	(São Paulo (state)) São Bento	6	3	1	2	7	8	−1	7		2–2		1–0	1–0
3	(São Paulo (state)) Marília	6	2	0	4	6	8	−2	4		1–2	1–2		1–0
4	(Minas Gerais) Rio Branco de Andradas	6	2	0	4	5	7	−2	4		2–0	2–1	0–2	

=== Group 7 ===
Pos	Team	Pld	W	D	L	GF	GA	GD	Pts	Qualification	OPE	MAR	CHA	BLU
1	(Paraná (state)) Operário Ferroviário	6	4	1	1	11	4	+7	9	Advance to Second phase		2–0	5–1	1–0
2	(Paraná (state)) Grêmio Maringá	6	3	1	2	5	5	0	7		1–0		0–2	2–0
3	(Santa Catarina (state)) Chapecoense	6	3	1	2	9	8	+1	7		1–1	1–2		2–0
4	(Santa Catarina (state)) Blumenau	6	0	1	5	1	9	−8	1		1–2	0–0	0–2	

== Second phase ==
=== Group A ===
Pos	Team	Pld	W	D	L	GF	GA	GD	Pts	Qualification	TUN	NAC	AUT
1	(Pará) Tuna Luso	4	2	2	0	3	1	+2	6	Advance to the Finals		0–0	1–0
2	(Amazonas (Brazilian state)) Nacional	4	1	2	1	4	2	+2	4		1–1		3–0
3	(Paraíba) Auto Esporte	4	1	0	3	1	5	−4	2		0–1	1–0	

=== Group B ===
==== Semifinal ====
Matches played on 10 and 17 May.

Team 1	Agg.	Team 2	1st leg	2nd leg
Operário Ferroviário (Paraná (state))	2–4	(Paraná (state)) Matsubara	2–2	0–2
Fluminense de Feira (Bahia)	1–1	(Espírito Santo) Rio Pardo	1–0	0–1

Fluminense de Feira qualified due to best record.

==== Final ====
Matches played on 24 and 27 May.

Team 1	Agg.	Team 2	1st leg	2nd leg
Fluminense de Feira (Bahia)	3–2	(Paraná (state)) Matsubara	1–0	2–2

== Final ==
7 June 1992

Fluminense de Feira	2–0	Tuna Luso
Acácio 2'; Ronaldo 82'

Estádio Joia da Princesa, Feira de Santana, Bahia

13 June 1992

Tuna Luso	3–1	Fluminense de Feira
Ageu 15'; Manelão 90'; Juninho 90+4'		41' Ronaldo

Baenão, Belém, Pará

Tuna Luso declared as the Campeonato Brasileiro Série C champions after better record during the tournament (3–3 aggregate score).
