= Jefinho (footballer, born 2001) =

Brazilian footballer

Personal information
- Full name: Jefferson Souza do Nascimento
- Date of birth: 6 October 2001 (age 25)
- Place of birth: Rio de Janeiro, Brazil
- Height: 1.78 m (5 ft 10 in)
- Position: Winger

Team information
- Current team: São José-SP
- Number: 11

Youth career
- 2017–2022: Fluminense

Senior career*
Years	Team	Apps	(Gls)
2022–2023	B-SAD	28	(3)
2024	Boavista	12	(1)
2024	→ Treze (loan)	16	(3)
2025	Treze	5	(0)
2025	Juazeirense	10	(0)
2025	America-RJ	0	(0)
2026	Sertãozinho	20	(2)
2026	Altos	10	(0)
2026–	São José-SP	0	(0)
- * Club domestic league appearances and goals as of 19:08, 8 July 2026 (UTC)

Jefferson Souza do Nascimento (born 6 October 2001), known as Jefinho, is a Brazilian professional footballer who plays as a left winger for São José-SP.

== Career ==
Born in Rio de Janeiro, Jefinho played for Fluminense as a youth before moving to Liga Portugal 2 side B-SAD in 2022. Back to Brazil for the 2024 season, he played in the Campeonato Carioca for Boavista before being loaned to Treze on 22 April of that year.

On 1 November 2024, Jefinho signed a permanent deal with Treze for the ensuing campaign, but featured rarely before moving to Juazeirense in April 2025. He ended the year at America-RJ, before being announced at Sertãozinho on 20 December.

On 17 April 2026, Jefinho moved to Altos. On 8 July, he was announced at São José-SP for the Copa Paulista.

== Career statistics ==
As of 8 July 2026

Club	Season	League			State League		Cup		Continental		Other		Total	
Club	Season	Division	Apps	Goals	Apps	Goals	Apps	Goals	Apps	Goals	Apps	Goals	Apps	Goals
B-SAD	2022–23	Liga Portugal 2	28	3	—		5	3	—		4 (Note: Two appearances in Taça da Liga, two appearances in the relegation play-offs)	0	37	6
Boavista	2024	Carioca	—		12	1	—		—		—		12	1
Treze	2024	Série D	16	3	—		—		—		—		16	3
Treze	2025	Série D	—		5	0	—		—		2 (Note: Appearance(s) in Copa do Nordeste)	0	7	0
Treze	Total		16	3	5	0	—		—		2	0	23	3
Juazeirense	2025	Série D	10	0	—		—		—		—		10	0
America-RJ	2025	Carioca Série A2	—		—		—		—		6 (Note: Appearance(s) in Copa Rio)	0	6	0
Sertãozinho	2026	Paulista A2	—		20	2	—		—		—		20	2
Altos	2026	Série D	10	0	—		—		—		—		10	0
São José-SP	2026	Paulista A2	—		—		—		—		0	0	0	0
Career total			64	6	37	3	5	3	0	0	12	0	118	12
