= Ruy Scarpino =

Brazilian football manager (1962–2021)

Personal information
- Full name: Ruy Santos Scarpino
- Date of birth: 17 February 1962
- Place of birth: Vitória, Espírito Santo, Brazil
- Date of death: 3 March 2021 (aged 59)
- Place of death: Manaus, Amazonas, Brazil

Managerial career
- Years: Team
- 1999: Moto Club
- 2000–2003: Ituano
- 2004: Moto Club
- 2004: Taquaritinga
- 2005: Goiânia
- 2006: Santo André
- 2007: Rio Branco-SP
- 2007: Grêmio Barueri
- 2007: Ituano
- 2008: América de Natal
- 2008–2009: Noroeste
- 2009: Linense
- 2009: Ceará
- 2011: Ituano
- 2012: Santo André
- 2012: Red Bull Brasil
- 2012: Catanduvense
- 2013: Capivariano
- 2013: São José
- 2014: União Barbarense
- 2015: Atlético Sorocaba
- 2015: Cuiabá
- 2015–2017: Moto Club
- 2017: Altos
- 2017: Maranhão
- 2018: Sertãozinho
- 2018: Campinense
- 2019: Imperatriz
- 2020: Campinense
- 2021: Amazonas FC

Ruy Santos Scarpino (17 February 1962 – 3 March 2021) was a Brazilian football manager.

== Personal life ==
Scarpino was born in Vitória. Amid the COVID-19 pandemic in Brazil, he was hospitalised with COVID-19 on 28 February 2021 and died on 3 March in Manaus.

== Honours ==
Ituano

- Campeonato Brasileiro Série C: 2003

Moto Club

- Campeonato Maranhense: 2004, 2016

Imperatriz

- Campeonato Maranhense: 2019
