= Leandro Campos =

Brazilian football manager (born 1964)

Personal information
- Full name: Leandro Caitano de Campos
- Date of birth: 6 February 1964 (age 62)
- Place of birth: Porto Alegre, Brazil

Team information
- Current team: Sousa (head coach)

Managerial career
- Years: Team
- 1993: Joinville
- 1998: Marcílio Dias
- 2000: Brusque
- 2000: Marcílio Dias
- 2002: Inter de Limeira
- 2004–2005: Ituano
- 2005: Inter de Limeira
- 2005: União Barbarense
- 2006: Ituano
- 2006: Paysandu
- 2007: Caldense
- 2007: Santo André
- 2008: Toledo
- 2008: Comercial-SP
- 2008: São Bento
- 2009: Joinville
- 2009: Marília
- 2010: ABC
- 2010: Marília
- 2011–2012: ABC
- 2012: Joinville
- 2013: Ceará
- 2013: ASA
- 2013: Guaratinguetá
- 2014: Treze
- 2015: Marcílio Dias
- 2015: Brusque
- 2016: Coruripe
- 2016: Itabaiana
- 2017: Horizonte
- 2017–2018: América-RN
- 2018: Itabaiana
- 2019: Altos
- 2019: Sergipe
- 2019: Ferroviário
- 2020: Moto Club
- 2020: Juventude Samas
- 2020: Hercílio Luz
- 2022: Itabaiana
- 2022: Icasa
- 2022–2023: 4 de Julho
- 2024: Icasa
- 2024: CSE
- 2025: Horizonte
- 2025: Juazeirense
- 2025–: Sousa

Leandro Campos (born 6 February 1964) is a Brazilian professional football coach, currently in charge of Sousa.

== Career ==
Coach of several teams across all regions of Brazil, Leandro Campos' most notable work was at ABC, where he was champion of Série C in 2010 and twice state champion, and in Ceará, where he was champion in 2013. In 2012, after leaving ABC, he still coached Joinville.

In 2015 he managed Brusque where he ended up relegated in the Campeonato Catarinense, returning to football in the northeast where he coached América, Altos, Sergipe, Ferroviário, and Moto Club. He tried to take on a new job in Santa Catarina, but was fired from Hercílio Luz after 15 days in charge. His most recent works were in Itabaiana, Icasa and 4 de Julho.

In October 2023 he was announced as coach of Icasa for the 2024 season.

In 2025, Campos managed Horizonte-CE during the state championship. In June he took over the SD Juazeirense team and in September, Sousa EC.

== Honours ==
ABC

- Campeonato Brasileiro Série C: 2010
- Campeonato Potiguar: 2010, 2011

Ceará

- Campeonato Cearense: 2013
