= Estádio Municipal Maria Tereza Breda =

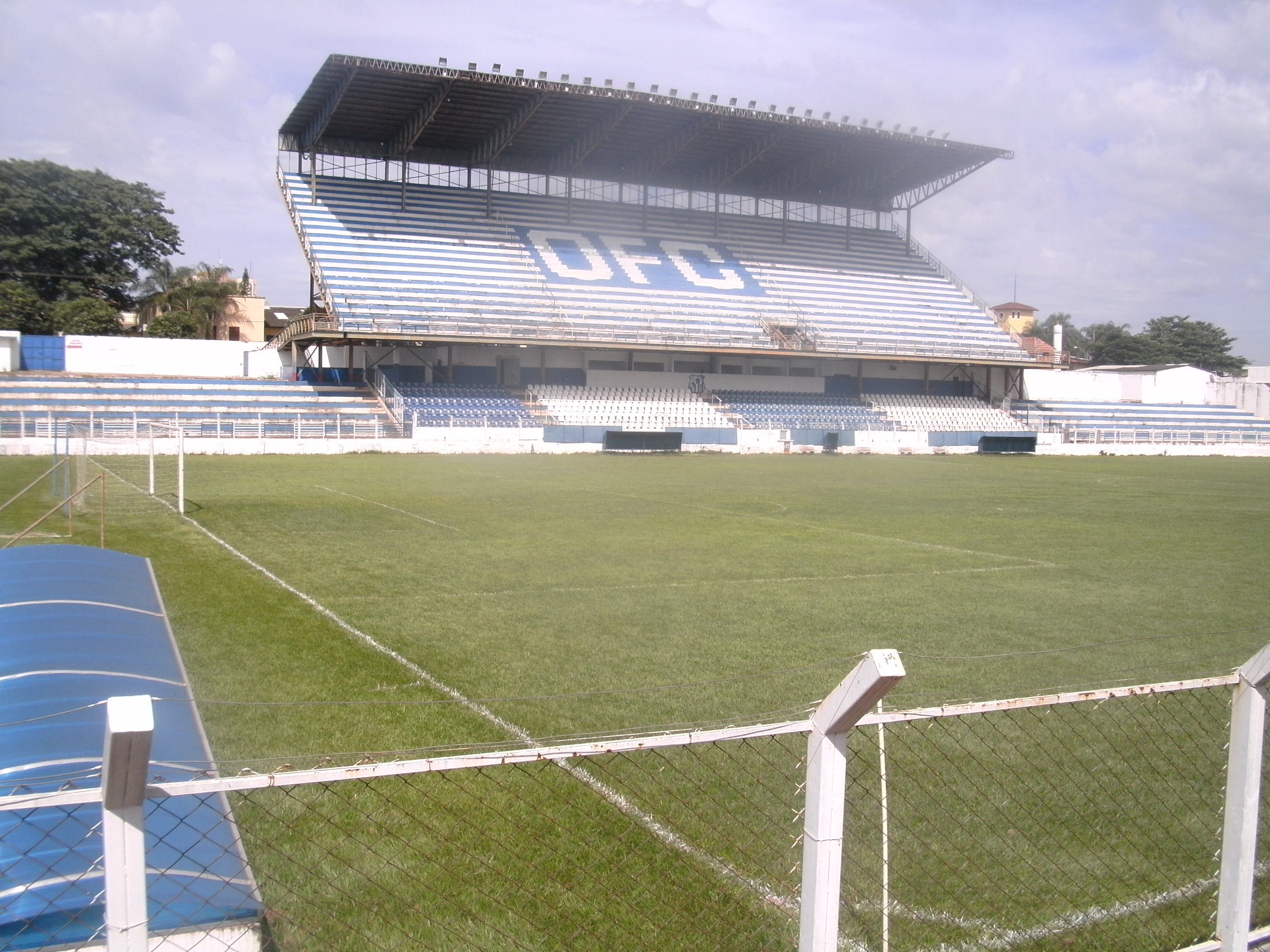
- Interactive map of Estádio Municipal Maria Tereza Breda
- Full name: Estádio Municipal Maria Tereza Breda
- Location: Olímpia, São Paulo, Brazil
- Coordinates: 20.73414°S 48.91473°W
- Owner: Olímpia Municipality
- Capacity: 15,022
- Surface: Natural grass
- Scoreboard: 105 by 68 metres (114.8 yd × 74.4 yd)

Construction
- Opened: September 11, 1949

Tenant
- Olímpia Futebol Clube

Estádio Municipal Maria Tereza Breda is a stadium in Olímpia, Brazil. It has a capacity of 15,022 spectators. It is the home of Olímpia Futebol Clube.
