= Rafael Riquelme =

Mexican footballer (born 19950)

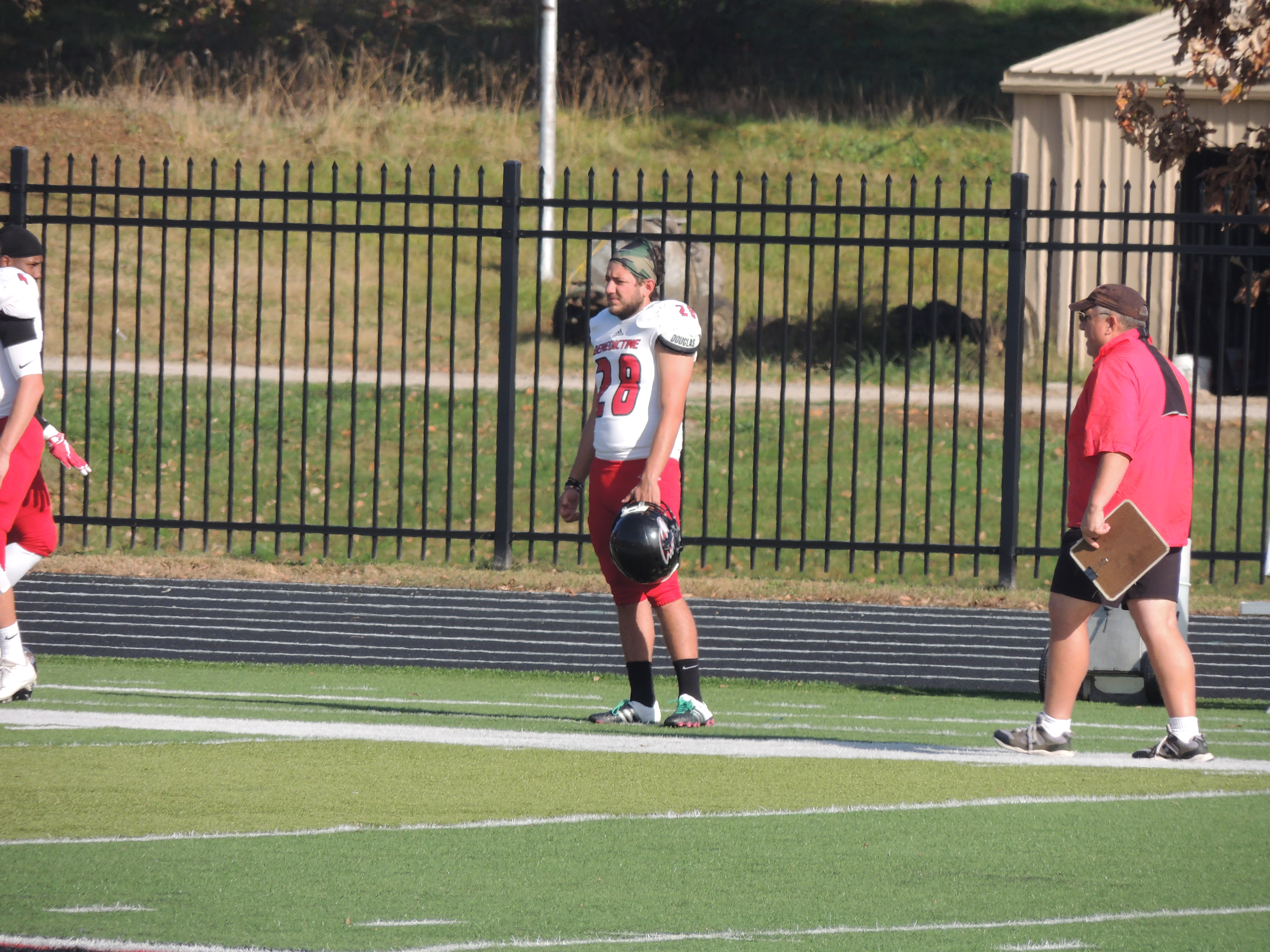
- Riquelme in 2016

Personal information
- Full name: Rafael Riquelme Díaz
- Nationality: Mexico
- Born: 10 May 1990 (age 36) Mexico City, Mexico
- Education: Benedictine College
- Occupation: Student/Athlete
- Years active: 1
- Height: 1.85 m (6 ft 1 in)
- Weight: 109 kg (240 lb)

Sport
- Country: United States
- Sport: American football
- Position: Placekicker
- College team: Benedictine College
- League: HAAC
- Coached by: Larry Wilcox

Achievements and titles
- World finals: FIFA U-17 World Cup 2011 Gold Medal
- Updated on 24 July 2016

Rafael Riquelme Díaz (born 10 May 1995) is a Mexican professional footballer who plays as winger for Club Universidad Nacional in Primera División de México. He was part of the Mexico national under-17 football team FIFA World Cup champions in 2011, becoming the first national team to achieve it while hosting, defeating Uruguay 2–0 and managing their second title. He recently graduated, he used to play college football as a placekicker at Benedictine College in Atchison, Kansas in the Heart of America Athletic Conference.

== Early life ==
Riquelme was born on 10 May 1995 in Mexico City, Mexico. His parents moved to Mexico when he was a baby. His mom, a nutritionist, was always encouraging him to play sports since he was 4 years old. He has a younger brother, Rodrigo Riquelme Díaz. At the age of four, Riquelme started playing football for the subsidiary Pumas Morelos, coached by Antonio Jasso. At the age of twelve, he was representing his home state in various tournaments around the country.

== High school ==
After retiring from football due to undisclosed differences he had with the club, Riquelme got a scholarship to play football at Maur Hill–Mount Academy so he decided to finish his junior and senior years of high school in Atchison, Kansas. While playing on the varsity football he was invited to play on the American football team as a placekicker. On 13 October 2013 in his second game, Riquelme scored a 54-yard field goal to help his school get a win against Horton High School. After this, he started gaining attention from Division-1 Colleges. On 4 February 2015 Riquelme signed his letter of intent to attend Benedictine College.

== College career ==
=== Benedictine College ===
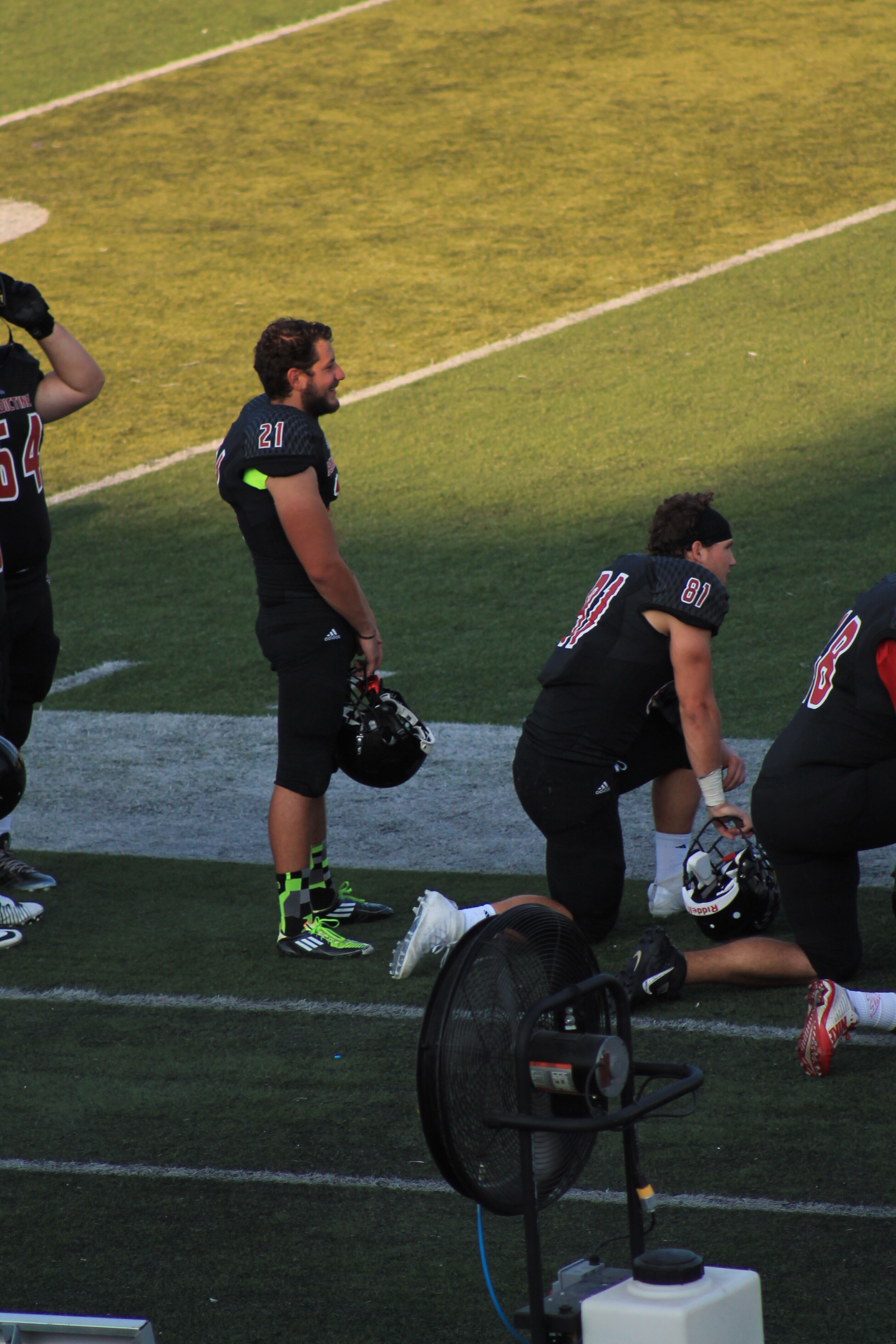
Riquelme on Sideline in 2016

Riquelme redshirted for the 2015 season, his first season at Benedictine College.

== International career ==
=== Mexico U-17 ===
At the time of the World Cup, Riquelme was one year younger than all the other players on the team, nevertheless, he was called up by Raúl Gutiérrez to serve as a reserve. Riquelme did not get to see any action during the World Cup.
