= Campeonato Brasileiro Série C =

Football league in Brazil

- Founded: 1981; 45 years ago
- Country: Brazil
- Number of clubs: 20 (24 from 2027)
- Level on pyramid: 3
- Promotion to: Série B
- Relegation to: Série D
- Current champions: Maringá (1st title) (2026)
- Most championships: Vila Nova (3 titles)
- Broadcasters: DAZN; SportyNet
- Website: Official website
- Current: 2026 Campeonato Brasileiro Série C

The Campeonato Brasileiro Série C, commonly known as the Série C or the Brazilian Série C to distinguish it from the Italian Serie C, is the third tier of the Brazilian football league system.

Unlike the first and second divisions, the Série C is not played in a double round robin system, and the tournament is organized in a different format.

From 1981 to 2008, it was the lowest national division of the country. However, beginning in 2009, the Série C was reduced from 64 teams to 20 and the new Campeonato Brasileiro Série D was introduced. In its current format, the first phase is played in a single round, with 19 matches. The top eight teams qualify for a second stage and the top two of each 4-team group are promoted to the Campeonato Brasileiro Série B, and the group winners decide the title. The four lowest-placed teams are relegated to the Campeonato Brasileiro Série D.

== History ==
Until 2008, the Série C was the lowest national division of Brazil. The teams that had been relegated from the Série B in the previous year were joined by teams qualified through each state championship, with those being the best teams not in the Série A, Série B or the four relegated to Série C. Qualification rules varied from state to state, with some federations using the state tournaments as qualification tournaments, and others organizing state cups, which served as qualification tournaments to the Série C.

From 2009 onwards, the competition was reduced to 20 teams. In the first format, the first stage was played in four groups of five teams each, and a 8-team knockout phase. In 2011, the final round was played in two groups of four. From 2012, the competition was played in two groups of ten teams in the first phase, with an 8-team knockout stage. This format was maintained until 2020, when the competition's Technical Council decided to make a change in the second phase, reintroducing two groups of four to determine the promoted teams and finalists, as in 2011. In 2022, in turn, the first phase was then played in a single round, with 19 matches instead of 18. The eight best teams qualify for the second phase, which is played in the same format as before, while the four lowest-placed teams are relegated.

There are calls to introduce the same format as the Série A and Série B, however this format hasn't yet been introduced to the competition.

== 2026 Série C teams ==
Team	Home city	State	Stadium	Capacity
Amazonas	Manaus	Amazonas	Municipal Carlos Zamith	5,000
Amazonas	Manaus	Amazonas	Arena da Amazônia	44,000
Anápolis	Anápolis	Goiás	Jonas Duarte	14,000
Barra	Itajaí	Santa Catarina	Arena Barra FC	5,500
Botafogo-PB	João Pessoa	Paraíba	Almeidão	25,770
Brusque	Brusque	Santa Catarina	Augusto Bauer	5,000
Caxias	Caxias do Sul	Rio Grande do Sul	Centenário	22,132
Confiança	Aracaju	Sergipe	Batistão	15,575
Ferroviária	Araraquara	São Paulo	Fonte Luminosa	20,000
Figueirense	Florianópolis	Santa Catarina	Orlando Scarpelli	19,584
Floresta	Fortaleza	Ceará	Presidente Vargas	20,262
Guarani	Campinas	São Paulo	Brinco de Ouro	29,130
Inter de Limeira	Limeira	São Paulo	Major José Levy Sobrinho	23,475
Itabaiana	Itabaiana	Sergipe	Etelvino Mendonça	12,000
Ituano	Itu	São Paulo	Novelli Júnior	18,560
Maranhão	São Luís	Maranhão	Castelão	40,149
Maringá	Maringá	Paraná	Willie Davids	16,226
Paysandu	Belém	Pará	Curuzu	16,200
Paysandu	Belém	Pará	Mangueirão	53,635
Santa Cruz	Recife	Pernambuco	Arruda	60,044
Volta Redonda	Volta Redonda	Rio de Janeiro	Raulino de Oliveira	20,255
Ypiranga	Erechim	Rio Grande do Sul	Colosso da Lagoa	22,000

== Champions ==
=== Official champions ===
The Campeonato Brasileiro has existed since 1971. However, there have been many years when no third division tournament took place. In most cases it was because the two elite divisions had too many clubs (in 1989, for instance, 96 teams contested the second division). The following table shows the winners and runners-up of the Série C tournaments played from 1981, according to the Brazilian Football Confederation:

Ed.	Season	Champion	Runner-up
1	1981	(Rio de Janeiro (state)) Olaria	(Pernambuco) Santo Amaro (Note: Named Manchete after 2005, disestablished in 2008.)
–	1982–1987	Not held	
2	1988	(São Paulo (state)) União São João	(Minas Gerais) Esportivo
–	1989	Not held	
3	1990	(Goiás) Atlético Goianiense	(Minas Gerais) América Mineiro
–	1991	Not held	
4	1992	(Pará) Tuna Luso	(Bahia) Fluminense de Feira
–	1993	Not held	
5	1994	(São Paulo (state)) Novorizontino	(São Paulo (state)) Ferroviária
6	1995	(São Paulo (state)) XV de Piracicaba	(Rio de Janeiro (state)) Volta Redonda
7	1996	(Goiás) Vila Nova	(São Paulo (state)) Botafogo
8	1997	(Maranhão) Sampaio Corrêa	(São Paulo (state)) Juventus
9	1998	(Santa Catarina (state)) Avaí	(São Paulo (state)) São Caetano
10	1999	(Rio de Janeiro (state)) Fluminense	(Amazonas (Brazilian state)) São Raimundo
11	2000	Not held See Copa João Havelange Group Green and White	
12	2001	(São Paulo (state)) Etti Jundiaí (Note: Currently named Paulista.)	(São Paulo (state)) Mogi Mirim
13	2002	(Federal District (Brazil)) Brasiliense	(São Paulo (state)) Marília
14	2003	(São Paulo (state)) Ituano	(São Paulo (state)) Santo André
15	2004	(São Paulo (state)) União Barbarense	(Federal District (Brazil)) Gama
16	2005	(Pará) Remo	(Rio Grande do Norte) América de Natal
17	2006	(Santa Catarina (state)) Criciúma	(Bahia) Vitória
18	2007	(São Paulo (state)) Bragantino	Bahia
19	2008	(Goiás) Atlético Goianiense	(São Paulo (state)) Guarani
20	2009	(Minas Gerais) América Mineiro	(Alagoas) ASA
21	2010	(Rio Grande do Norte) ABC	(Minas Gerais) Ituiutaba (Note: Currently named Boa Esporte.)
22	2011	(Santa Catarina (state)) Joinville	(Alagoas) CRB
23	2012	(São Paulo (state)) Oeste	(Ceará) Icasa
24	2013	(Pernambuco) Santa Cruz	(Maranhão) Sampaio Corrêa
25	2014	(Rio de Janeiro (state)) Macaé	(Pará) Paysandu
26	2015	(Goiás) Vila Nova	(Paraná (state)) Londrina
27	2016	(Minas Gerais) Boa Esporte	(São Paulo (state)) Guarani
28	2017	(Alagoas) CSA	(Ceará) Fortaleza
29	2018	(Paraná (state)) Operário Ferroviário	(Mato Grosso) Cuiabá
30	2019	(Pernambuco) Náutico	(Maranhão) Sampaio Corrêa
31	2020	(Goiás) Vila Nova	(Pará) Remo
32	2021	(São Paulo (state)) Ituano	(Minas Gerais) Tombense
33	2022	(São Paulo (state)) Mirassol	(Rio Grande do Norte) ABC
34	2023	(Amazonas (Brazilian state)) Amazonas	(Santa Catarina (state)) Brusque
35	2024	(Rio de Janeiro (state)) Volta Redonda	(Minas Gerais) Athletic
36	2025	(São Paulo (state)) Ponte Preta	(Paraná (state)) Londrina
37	2026	(Paraná (state)) Maringá	(São Paulo (state)) Ferroviária

=== Unofficial champions ===
The following season is the part corresponding to the third level of the Copa João Havelange, a competition organized by the Clube dos 13, and is not officially recognized by the CBF:

Season	Champion	Runner-up	Comments
2000	(Paraná (state)) Malutrom	(Minas Gerais) Uberlândia	It was the Green and White modules of the Copa João Havelange.

== Titles by team ==
Rank	Club	Winners	Winning years
1	(Goiás) Vila Nova	3	1996, 2015, 2020
2	(Goiás) Atlético Goianiense	2	1990, 2008
2	(São Paulo (state)) Ituano	2	2003, 2021
4	(Rio Grande do Norte) ABC	1	2010
4	(Amazonas (Brazilian state)) Amazonas	1	2023
4	(Minas Gerais) América Mineiro	1	2009
4	(Santa Catarina (state)) Avaí	1	1998
4	(Minas Gerais) Boa Esporte	1	2016
4	(Federal District (Brazil)) Brasiliense	1	2002
4	(Santa Catarina (state)) Criciúma	1	2006
4	(Alagoas) CSA	1	2017
4	(Rio de Janeiro (state)) Fluminense	1	1999
4	(Santa Catarina (state)) Joinville	1	2011
4	(Rio de Janeiro (state)) Macaé	1	2014
4	(Paraná (state)) Maringá	1	2026
4	(São Paulo (state)) Mirassol	1	2022
4	(Pernambuco) Náutico	1	2019
4	(São Paulo (state)) Novorizontino	1	1994
4	(São Paulo (state)) Oeste	1	2012
4	(Rio de Janeiro (state)) Olaria	1	1981
4	(Paraná (state)) Operário Ferroviário	1	2018
4	(São Paulo (state)) Paulista	1	2001
4	(São Paulo (state)) Ponte Preta	1	2025
4	(São Paulo (state)) Red Bull Bragantino	1	2007
4	(Pará) Remo	1	2005
4	(Maranhão) Sampaio Corrêa	1	1997
4	(Pernambuco) Santa Cruz	1	2013
4	(Pará) Tuna Luso	1	1992
4	(São Paulo (state)) União Barbarense	1	2004
4	(São Paulo (state)) União São João	1	1988
4	(Rio de Janeiro (state)) Volta Redonda	1	2024
4	(São Paulo (state)) XV de Piracicaba	1	1995

== Titles by state ==
State	Nº of titles
São Paulo	11
Goiás	5
Rio de Janeiro	4
Santa Catarina	3
Minas Gerais	2
Pará	2
Paraná	2
Pernambuco	2
Alagoas	1
Amazonas	1
Distrito Federal	1
Maranhão	1
Rio Grande do Norte	1

== Participations ==
=== Most appearances ===
As of 2026 season

Below is the list of clubs that have more appearances in the Campeonato Brasileiro Série C.

Club	App	First	Last
Confiança	25	1988	2026
Botafogo (PB)	23	1988	2026
Caxias	19	1990	2026
Volta Redonda	18	1988	2026
Ferroviário	17	1988	2024
CSA	16	1990	2025
Tupi	16	1988	2018
Brasil de Pelotas	15	1995	2022
Treze	15	1992	2020
ABC	14	1988	2025
Figueirense	14	1981	2026
Fortaleza	14	1990	2017
Paysandu	14	1990	2026
ASA	13	1992	2017
Madureira	13	1981	2015
Sampaio Corrêa	13	1992	2024
Atlético Goianiense	12	1990	2008
Itabaiana	12	1994	2026
Rio Branco (SP)	12	1994	2006
Ypiranga de Erechim	12	1995	2026

=== Clubs promoted to Série B ===
Year	Clubs
1981	~~Olaria~~
1988	None
1990	None
1992	None
1994	Novorizontino, Ferroviária
1995	XV de Piracicaba, Volta Redonda, Gama, Atlético Goianiense, ABC, Joinville
1996	Vila Nova, Botafogo (SP)
1997	Sampaio Corrêa, Juventus
1998	Avaí, São Caetano
1999–2000	See Copa João Havelange
2001	Etti Jundiaí, Mogi Mirim, Guarany de Sobral
2002	Brasiliense, Marília
2003	Ituano, Santo André
2004	União Barbarense, Gama
2005	Remo, América de Natal
2006	Criciúma, Vitória, Ipatinga, Grêmio Barueri
2007	Bragantino, Bahia, Vila Nova, ABC
2008	Atlético Goianiense, Guarani, Campinense, Duque de Caxias
2009	América Mineiro, ASA, Guaratinguetá, Icasa
2010	ABC, Ituiutaba, Criciúma, Salgueiro
2011	Joinville, CRB, Ipatinga, América de Natal
2012	Oeste, Icasa, Chapecoense, Paysandu
2013	Santa Cruz, Sampaio Corrêa, Luverdense, Vila Nova
2014	Macaé, Paysandu, Mogi Mirim, CRB
2015	Vila Nova, Londrina, Tupi, Brasil de Pelotas
2016	Boa Esporte, Guarani, ABC, Juventude
2017	CSA, Fortaleza, Sampaio Corrêa, São Bento
2018	Operário Ferroviário, Cuiabá, Botafogo (SP), Bragantino
2019	Náutico, Sampaio Corrêa, Juventude, Confiança
2020	Vila Nova, Remo, Brusque, Londrina
2021	Ituano, Tombense, Novorizontino, Criciúma
2022	Mirassol, ABC, Botafogo (SP), Vitória
2023	Amazonas, Brusque, Operário Ferroviário, Paysandu
2024	Volta Redonda, Athletic, Ferroviária, Remo
2025	Ponte Preta, Londrina, Náutico, São Bernardo
2026	Maringá, Ferroviária, Santa Cruz, Inter de Limeira

1. Olaria lost the right to compete in the 1982 Taça de Prata after being relegated in the Campeonato Carioca.
2. Teams promoted after América de Rio Preto, Bangu, Barra do Garças, Ferroviária and Novorizontino withdrew from Série B.
3. Promoted after Malutron withdrew from Série B.

=== Clubs relegated to Série D ===
Year	Clubs
2010	Alecrim, Juventude, Gama, São Raimundo (PA)
2011	Campinense, Marília, Brasil de Pelotas, Araguaína
2012	Salgueiro, Santo André, Guarany de Sobral, Tupi
2013	Betim, Brasiliense, Grêmio Barueri, Baraúnas, Rio Branco (AC)
2014	São Caetano, Treze, CRAC, Duque de Caxias
2015	Águia de Marabá, Madureira, Icasa, Caxias
2016	América de Natal, Portuguesa, Ríver, Guaratinguetá
2017	Moto Club, Macaé, ASA, Mogi Mirim
2018	Tupi, Juazeirense, Salgueiro, Joinville
2019	ABC, Globo, Luverdense, Atlético Acreano
2020	Treze, São Bento, Boa Esporte, Imperatriz
2021	Jacuipense, Paraná, Santa Cruz, Oeste
2022	Atlético Cearense, Brasil de Pelotas, Ferroviário, Campinense
2023	Manaus, América de Natal, Altos, Pouso Alegre
2024	Sampaio Corrêa, Aparecidense, Ferroviário, São José (RS)
2025	CSA, ABC, Retrô, Tombense
2026	Itabaiana, Confiança

1. Expelled by the sports court. CRAC is spared from relegation.

== Topscorers ==
Year	Player (team)	Goals
1981	Fabinho (Santo Amaro); Pedro Müller (São Borja)	5
1988	Kel (União São João)	9
1990	Júlio César (Atlético Goianiense)	10
1992	Jorge Veras (Ferroviário-CE)	9
1994	Rogerinho (Caldas)	5
1995	Serginho (XV de Piracicaba)	6
1996	Marcelinho (Rio Branco-SP)	16
1997	Marcelo Baron (Sampaio Corrêa)	9
1998	Fabrício (Anapolina)	14
1999	Aldrovani (Figueirense)	14
2000	Murilo (Tuna Luso)	10
2001	Edmilson (Brasiliense); Jean Carlos (Etti Jundiaí); Rodrigo Ayres (Atlético Goianiense)	14
2002	Túlio Maravilha (Brasiliense); Wellington Dias (Brasiliense)	11
2003	Nílson Sergipano (Botafogo-PB)	11
2004	Frontini (União Barbarense); Marciano (Limoeiro); Vítor (Gama)	10
2005	Paulinho Marília (América-RN)	10
2006	Sorato (Bahia)	16
2007	Túlio Maravilha (Vila Nova)	27
2008	Marcão (Atlético Goianiense)	25
2009	Marciano (Icasa); Nena (ASA)	8
2010	Bruno Rangel (Paysandu)	8
2011	Ronaldo Capixaba (Joinville)	11
2012	Dênis Marques (Santa Cruz)	11
2013	Assisinho (Fortaleza)	12
2014	Ytalo (Guaratinguetá)	12
2015	Guilherme Queiróz (Portuguesa)	12
2016	Jones Carioca (ABC)	12
2017	Rafael Grampola (Joinville)	13
2018	Caio Dantas (Botafogo-SP)	11
2019	Eduardo (Treze); Luiz Eduardo (São José-RS); Negueba (Globo); Salatiel (Sampaio Corrêa)	8
2020	Thiago Alagoano (Brusque)	12
2021	Diego Quirino (Ypiranga de Erechim)	10
2022	Alex Henrique (Aparecidense)	12
2023	Sassá (Amazonas)	18
2024	Kayke (São Bernardo); Paulo Sérgio (Náutico)	10
2025	Iago Teles (Londrina); Jonas Toró (Ponte Preta)	8
2026	Miguel Bianconi (Inter de Limeira)	10

== Winning managers ==
Year	Manager	Club
1981	Duque	Olaria
1988	José Duarte	União São João
1990	Homero Cavalheiro	Atlético Goianiense
1992	Nélio Pereira	Tuna Luso
1994	José Teixeira	Novorizotino
1995	Vadão	XV de Piracicaba
1996	Roberval Davino	Vila Nova
1997	Pinho	Sampaio Corrêa
1998	Roberto Cavalo	Avaí
1999	Carlos Alberto Parreira	Fluminense
2000	Amauri Knevitz	Malutron
2001	Giba	Etti Jundiaí
2002	Gérson Andreotti	Brasiliense
2003	Ruy Scarpino	Ituano
2004	Sérgio Farias	União Barbarense
2005	Roberval Davino (2)	Remo
2006	Guilherme Macuglia	Criciúma
2007	Marcelo Veiga	Bragantino
2008	Mauro Fernandes	Atlético Goianiense
2009	Givanildo Oliveira	América Mineiro
2010	Leandro Campos	ABC
2011	Arturzinho	Joinville
2012	Luís Carlos Martins	Oeste
2013	Vica	Santa Cruz
2014	Josué Teixeira	Macaé
2015	Márcio Fernandes	Vila Nova
2016	Ney da Matta	Boa Esporte
2017	Flávio Araújo	CSA
2018	Gerson Gusmão	Operário Ferroviário
2019	Gilmar Dal Pozzo	Náutico
2020	Márcio Fernandes (2)	Vila Nova
2021	Mazola Júnior	Ituano
2022	Ricardo Catalá	Mirassol
2023	Luizinho Vieira	Amazonas
2024	Rogério Corrêa	Volta Redonda
2025	Marcelo Fernandes	Ponte Preta
2026	Ivan Campanari	Maringá

== See also ==
- Campeonato Brasileiro Série A, the main division of Brazilian football
- Campeonato Brasileiro Série B, the second division of Brazilian football
- Campeonato Brasileiro Série D, the fourth division of Brazilian football
