= Riquelme (footballer, born October 2002) =

Brazilian footballer

Personal information
- Full name: Riquelme Rodrigues Mendes
- Date of birth: 9 February 2002 (age 24)
- Place of birth: São Paulo, Brazil
- Height: 1.77 m (5 ft 10 in)
- Position: Defensive midfielder

Team information
- Current team: DAC Dunajská Streda and ŠTK Šamorín
- Number: 55

Youth career
- 2013–2022: Corinthians

Senior career*
Years	Team	Apps	(Gls)
2023−	DAC Dunajská Streda	2	(0)
2023−	→ ŠTK Šamorín	10	(3)
2023−2024	→ Győr (loan)	19	(3)
2023−2024	Sertãozinho	20	(1)
- * Club domestic league appearances and goals as of 15 April 2026

Riquelme Rodrigues Mendes (born 2 October 2002), known as just Riquelme, is a Brazilian footballer who plays for DAC Dunajská Streda and its reserves ŠTK Šamorín as a midfielder.

== Club career ==
=== DAC Dunajská Streda ===
Riquelme made his professional Fortuna Liga debut for Dunajská Streda in a match against Železiarne Podbrezová at ZELPO Aréna on 30 April 2023. Riquelme started the goal at the bench and entered play after 68 minutes, replacing Syrian international Ammar Ramadan, when DAC trailed to Železiari 1–0, following a first half goal by Marek Bartoš. While on pitch, DAC conceded from Christophe Kabongo, setting the final score of the 2–0 defeat. Two weeks later, Riquelme collected his second appearance at pod Dubňom versus Žilina after 75 minutes of play, when he replaced Miroslav Káčer, with the final winning score of 0–1 already set, following a goal by season's top scorer Nikola Krstović. In his first season in Slovakia, Riquelme also collected 7 appearances and 3 goals in 2. Liga for reserves side of ŠTK Šamorín.

== Career statistics ==
As of 15 April 2026

Appearances and goals by club, season and competition
Club	Season	League			State League		League cup		Continental		Other		Total	
Club	Season	Division	Apps	Goals	Apps	Goals	Apps	Goals	Apps	Goals	Apps	Goals	Apps	Goals
ŠTK Šamorín (loan)	2022-23	2. Liga	7	3	0	0	0	0	0	0	—		7	3
DAC Dunajská Streda	2022-23	First League	2	0	0	0	0	0	0	0	—		2	0
Győri FC (loan)	2023–24	NB II	19	3	0	0	0	0	0	0	—		19	3
ŠTK Šamorín (loan)	2024–25	2. Liga	3	0	0	0	0	0	0	0	—		3	0
Sertãozinho	2026	Série A2	20	1	0	0	0	0	0	0	—		20	1
Career total			51	7	0	0	0	0	0	0	0	0	51	7
