= Rua Bariri =

Football stadium in Rio de Janeiro, Brazil

Coordinates: 22°50′28.93″S 43°16′00.29″W

Estádio da Rua Bariri
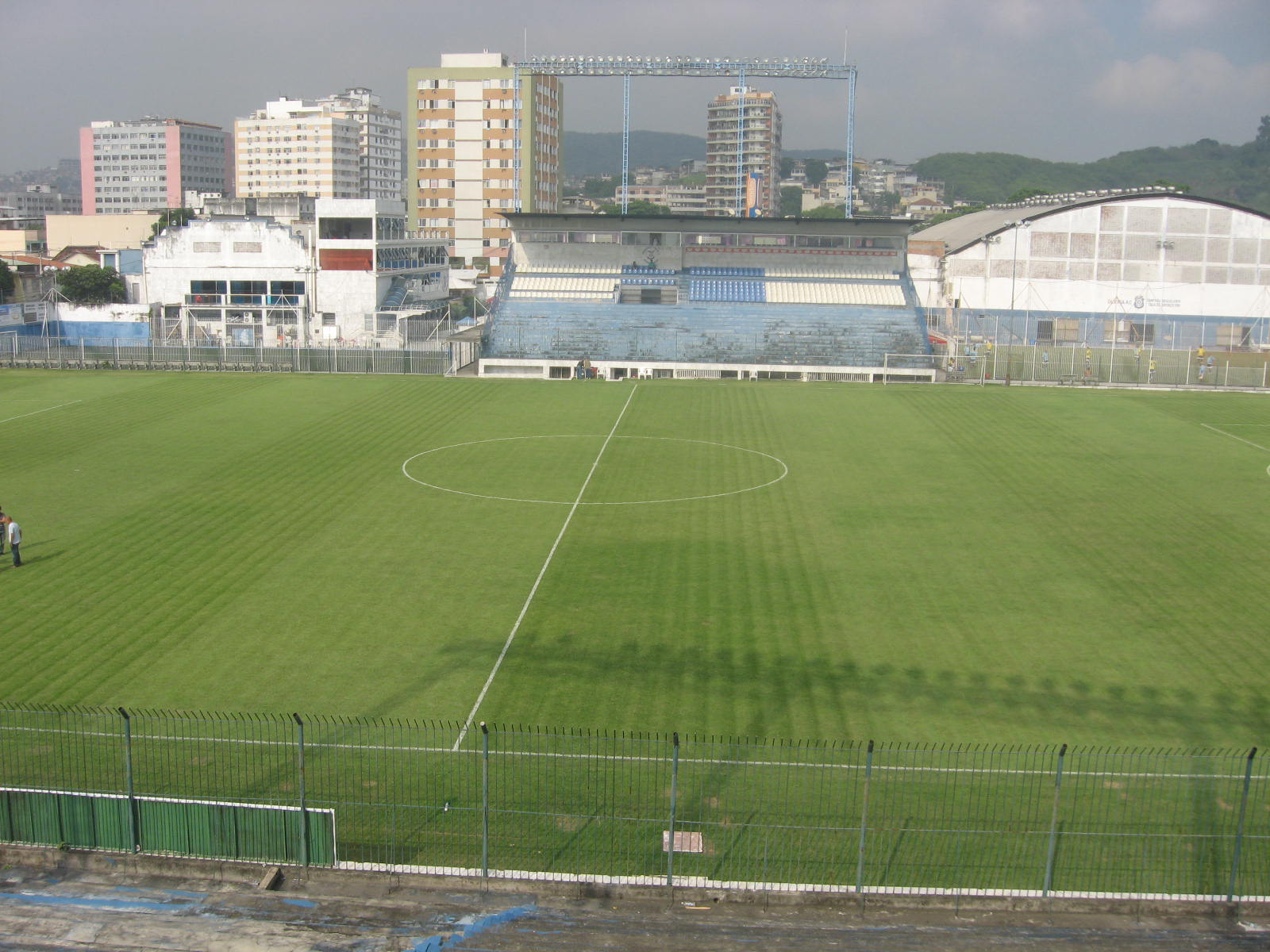
- Interactive map of Estádio da Rua Bariri
- Full name: Estádio Mourão Vieira Filho
- Location: Rio de Janeiro, Rio de Janeiro, Brazil
- Owner: Olaria Atlético Clube
- Capacity: 8,300
- Surface: Grass

Construction
- Opened: April 6, 1947

Tenant
- Olaria Atlético Clube

Estádio Mourão Vieira Filho, usually known as Estádio da Rua Bariri, is a football stadium in Olaria neighborhood, Rio de Janeiro, Brazil. The stadium has a maximum capacity of 8,300 people. It was built in 1947.

Estádio da Rua Bariri is owned by Olaria Atlético Clube. The stadium is named after Mourão Vieira Filho, who was an alderman (vereador, in Portuguese language) and is the one who made possible the stadium construction. Bariri means rapid in a Tupi–Guarani language, and is the name of the street where the stadium is located.

The stadium is often rented to the big clubs of Rio de Janeiro, especially Flamengo, when they are not able to play at the Maracanã stadium.

== History ==
In 1947, the works on Estádio da Rua Bariri were completed. The inaugural match was played on April 6 of that year, when Fluminense beat Vasco da Gama 4-3. The first goal of the stadium was scored by Vasco da Gama's Friaça.

The stadium's attendance record currently stands at 18,000, set on 30 April 1997, when Flamengo beat Bangu 3-1.
