= Manchete Futebol Clube do Recife =

Manchete
- Full name: Manchete Futebol Clube do Recife
- Nickname(s): Colorado; Alvirrubro
- Founded: 1 January 1950
- Dissolved: 2008; 17 years ago
- Ground: Estádio Agamenon Magalhães, Goiana, Pernambuco state, Brazil
- Capacity: 1,200
Home colors	Away colors	colors

Manchete Futebol Clube do Recife, also known as Manchete, was a Brazilian football club based in Recife, Pernambuco state. The club has been runner-up in the Série C once, in 1981.

== History ==
The club was founded on January 1, 1950 as Associação Atlética das Vovozinhas. Vovozinhas was renamed to Associação Atlética Santo Amaro in 1965. As Santo Amaro, the club finished as runner-up in the 1981 Série C, when they were defeated by Olaria. Santo Amaro was later renamed to Associação Atlética Casa Caiada, and then as Recife Futebol Clube in 1994. They have the Copa Pernambuco four times, in 1996, 1997, 2000 and in 2002. The club is known as Manchete Futebol Clube do Recife since February 2, 2004.

== Honours ==
=== National ===
- Campeonato Brasileiro Série C
  - Runners-up (1): 1981

=== State ===
- Copa Pernambuco
  - Winners (4): 1996, 1997, 2000, 2002

== Stadium ==
Manchete Futebol Clube do Recife play their home games at Estádio Agamenon Magalhães. The stadium has a maximum capacity of 1,200 people.
