= Olaria Atlético Clube =

Olaria
- Full name: Olaria Atlético Clube
- Nicknames: Olá; Azulão (Big Blue); Azulão da Bariri (Bariri's Big Blue); Índio da Rua Bariri (Indian Warrior of Rua Bariri)
- Founded: July 1, 1915; 111 years ago
- Ground: Rua Bariri
- Capacity: 8,300
- President: Edilberth Pellegrini Nahn
- Head coach: Cleimar Rocha
- League: Campeonato Carioca Série A2
- 2019: Carioca A2, 3rd
| Home colors | Away colors |

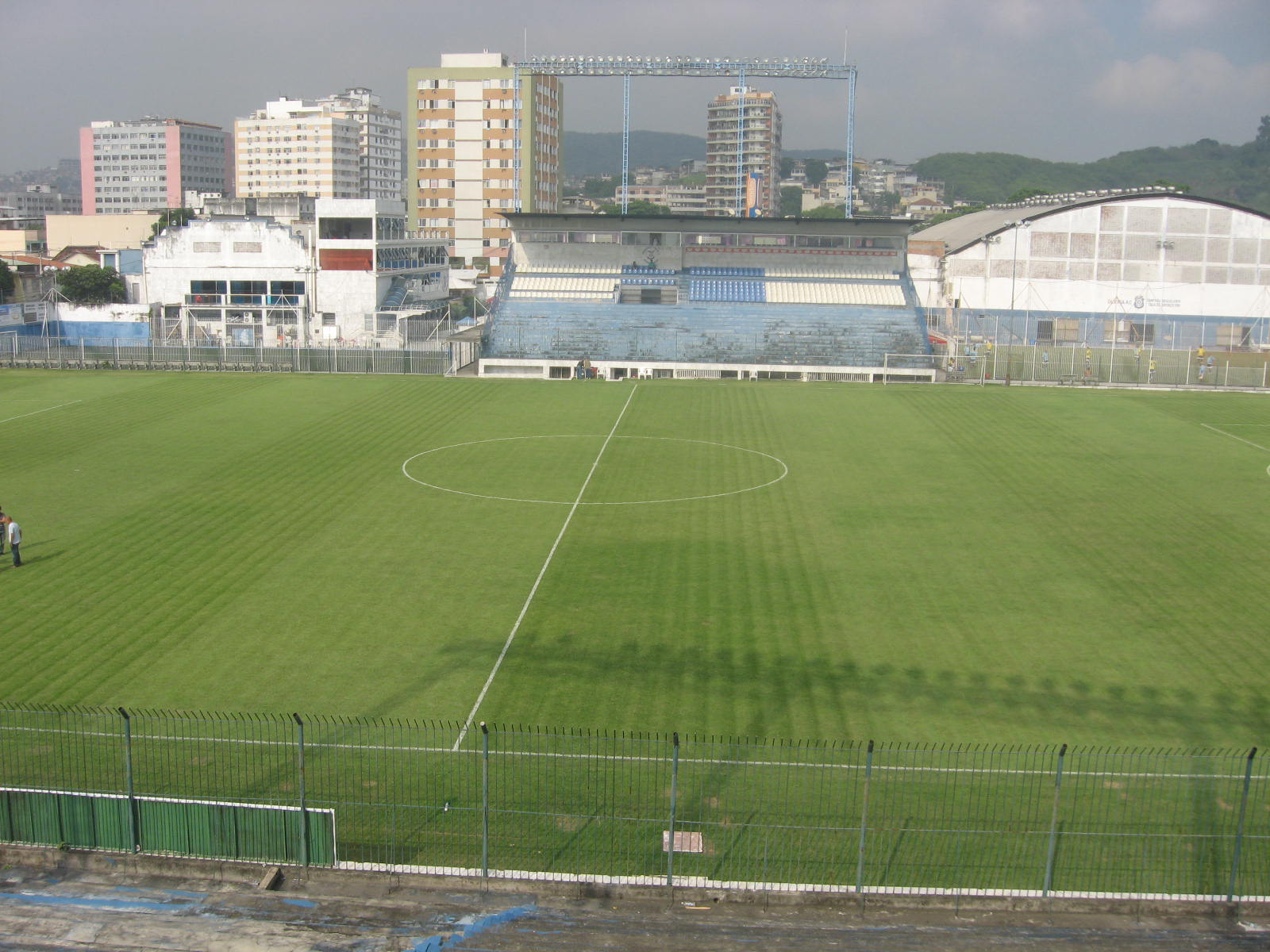
Estádio da Rua Bariri

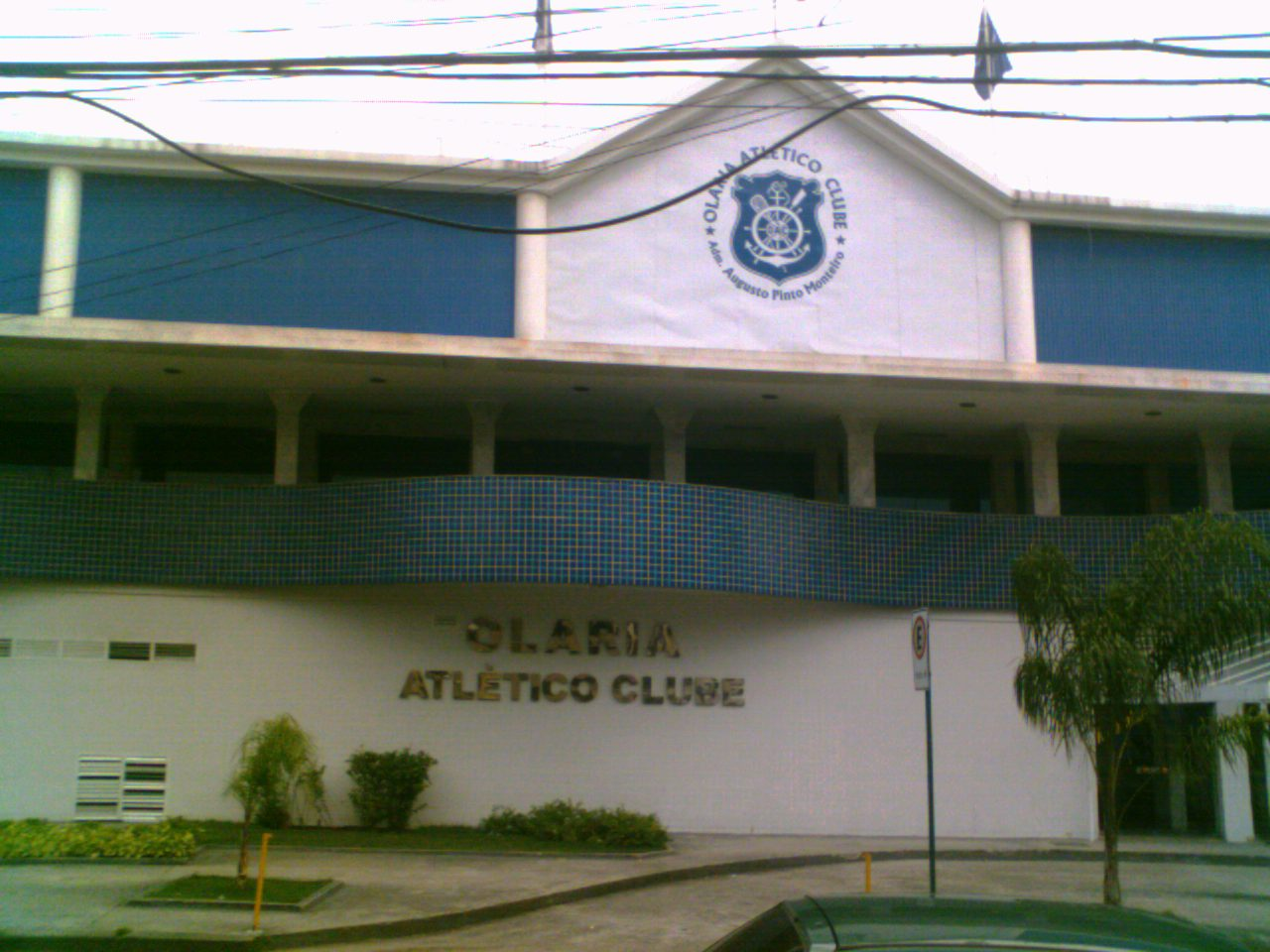
Olaria Atlético Clube headquarters.

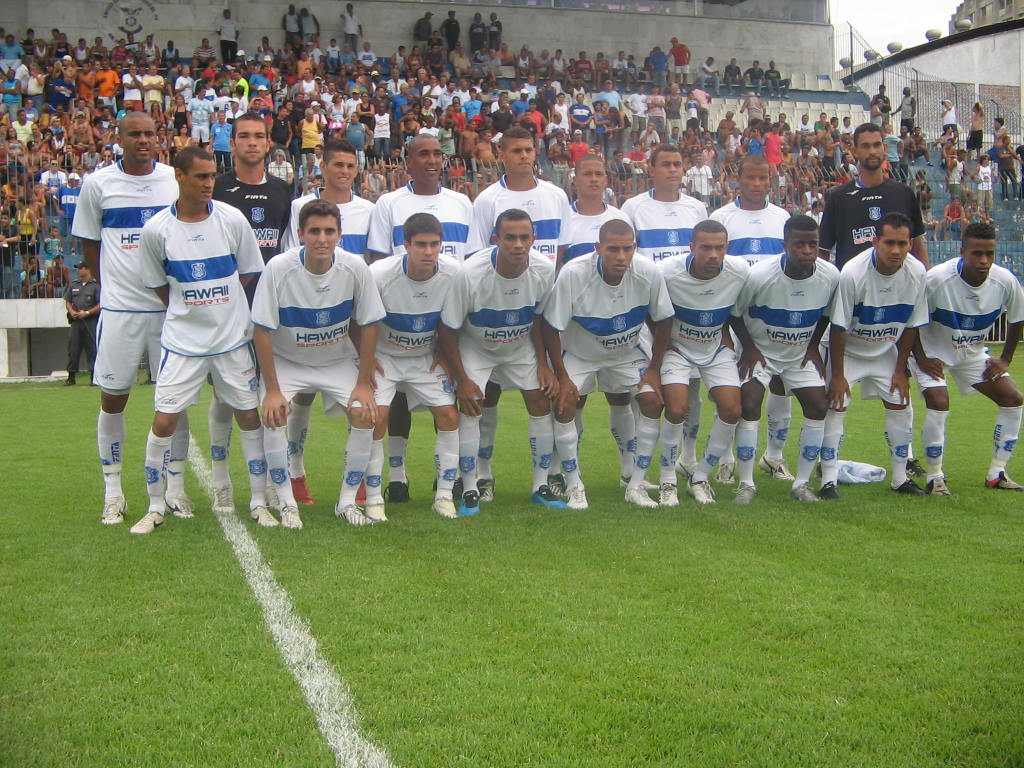
Team photo from the 2009 season

Olaria Atlético Clube (Olaria Athletic Club in English), usually abbreviated to Olaria, is a Brazilian football club established in 1915, since expanded into other sports. Mostly known for its Brazilian football team based in the city of Rio de Janeiro, in the neighbourhood of Olaria. The team competes in the Campeonato Carioca Série A2, the second tier of the Rio de Janeiro state football league.

Olaria is one of the small clubs from Rio de Janeiro that have managed to remain active in the shade of the four big ones (Botafogo, Flamengo, Fluminense and Vasco da Gama).

The club is the first champion of the Campeonato Brasileiro Série C, winning the 1981 edition.

== History ==
On July 1, 1915, the club was founded as Japonês Futebol Clube (Japanese Football Club, in English). The club was later that year renamed to Olaria Atlético Clube, by Calorino Martins Arantes, who was a club director, to attract more supporters.

In 1974, Olaria competed in the Série A, finishing in the 28th position.

In 1981, Olaria won the Série C, called Taça de Bronze (Bronze Cup). In the final, the club beat Santo Amaro of Pernambuco state. In 1983, the club won the Campeonato Carioca Second Division, being promoted to the following year's first division.

In 1999, an enterprise called Sport News assumed the club's football section for a short time period.

In 2000, Olaria was in the White Module (which was the equivalent of a third level) of that season's Série A, named Copa João Havelange. The club was eliminated in the first stage. In 2003, the club competed again in the Campeonato Brasileiro Série C. Olaria was eliminated in the third stage by fellow Rio de Janeiro state club Cabofriense.

== Honours ==
=== Official tournaments ===
National
| Competitions | Titles | Seasons |
|---|---|---|
| Campeonato Brasileiro Série C | 1 | 1981 |
State
| Competitions | Titles | Seasons |
| Campeonato Carioca Série A2 | 4 | 1931, 1938, 1980, 1983 |
| Campeonato Carioca Série B1 | 1 | 2021 |

=== Others tournaments ===
==== State ====
- Taça Moisés Mathias de Andrade (1): 2010
- Torneio Início (1): 1960
- Taça Corcovado (1): 2022

=== Runners-up ===
- Campeonato Carioca (1): 1933
- Copa Rio (2): 2023, 2024
- Campeonato Carioca Série A2 (7): 1929, 1965, 1988, 2009, 2022, 2023, 2024

== Stadium ==
Home stadium is Estádio da Rua Bariri, which has a maximum capacity of 11,000 people. This stadium is often rented to the big clubs (notably Flamengo) when they are unable to play at the Maracanã or at the Engenhão.

== Anthem ==
The club's official anthem was composed by Lamartine Babo, who composed the anthems of the 4 Rio de Janeiro big clubs and other clubs that participated in the 1949 Campeonato Carioca.

=== In Portuguese ===
Olaria,

Teu esforço e tua glória,

Estão crescendo a cada dia,

Olaria,

Tua punjança e tua vida envaidece a torcida,

Olaria,

Tua camisa azul e branco tem um "quê" de simpatia.

Realizando um sonhos mil, Tu serás um pioneiro dos esportes no Brasil

(Chorus)

Clube da faixa azul-celeste, Tu vieste da Zona Norte,

Clube da faixa azul-celeste, Tu vieste da Zona Norte

=== In English ===
Olaria,

Your effort and your glory,

Are growing every day,

Olaria,

Your punjancy and your life flatters the crowd,

Olaria,

Your blue and white shirt has a "quê" of sympathy.

Fulfilling a thousand dreams, You will be one of the pioneers of sports in Brazil

(Chorus)

The club of the sky blue belt, You come from the Zona Norte

The club of the sky blue belt, You come from the Zona Norte

== Mascot ==
The club's mascot is an Indian.

== Other sports ==
Besides football, Olaria also has other sports sections, such as futsal, button football, football society, karate, judo, basketball and swimming.

== Gallery ==
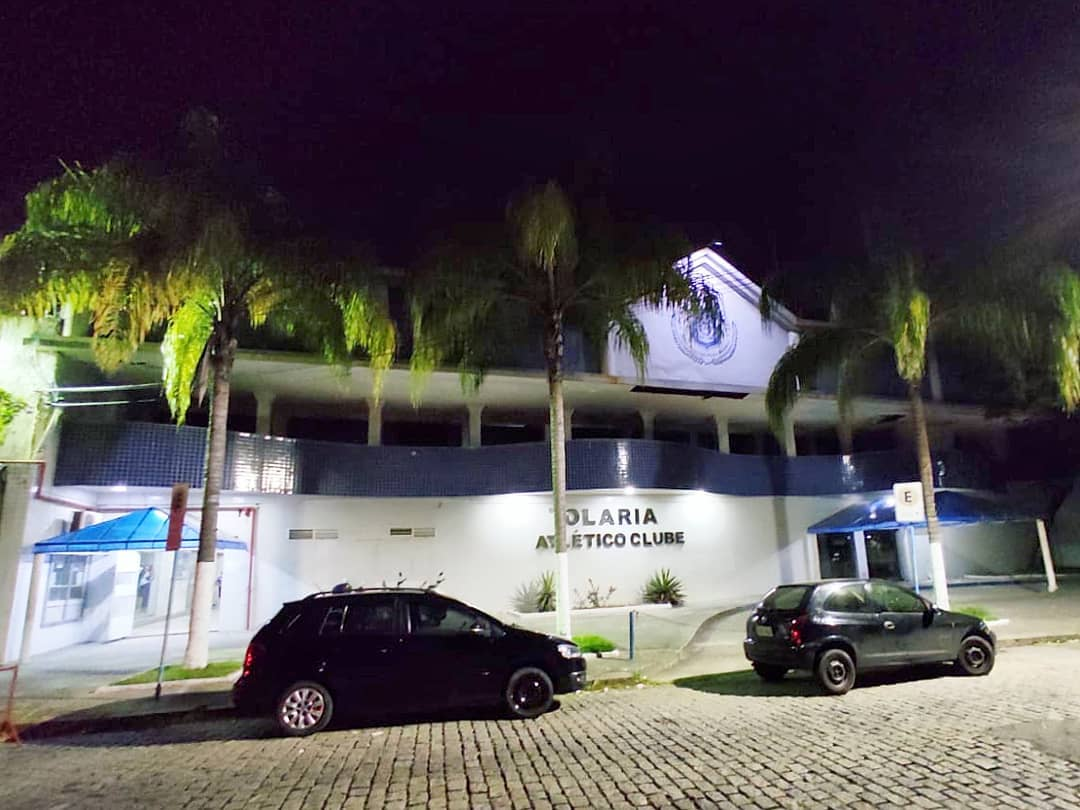
Olaria Atlético Clube Headquarters

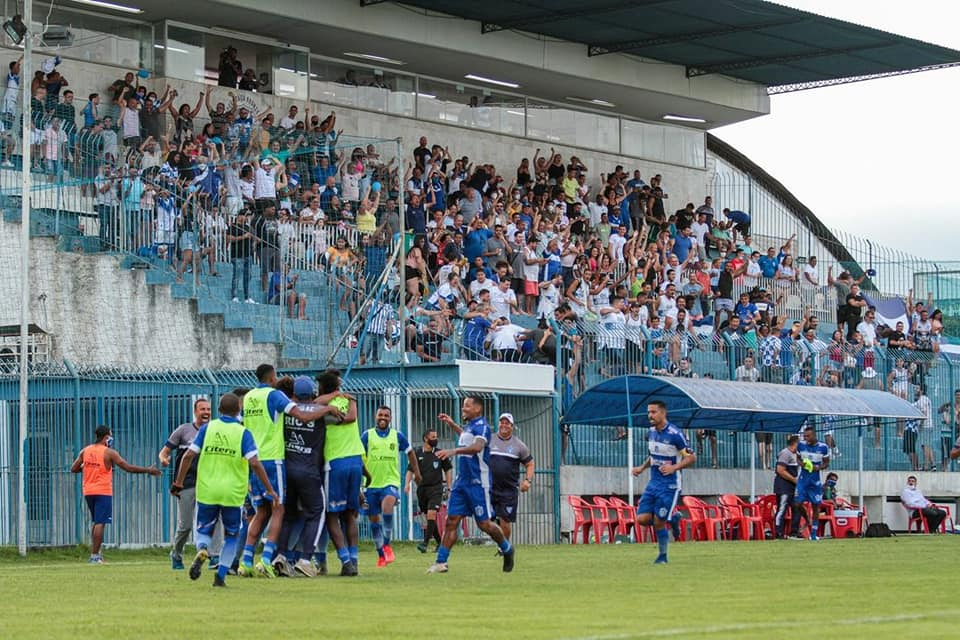
Fans of Olaria Atlético Clube

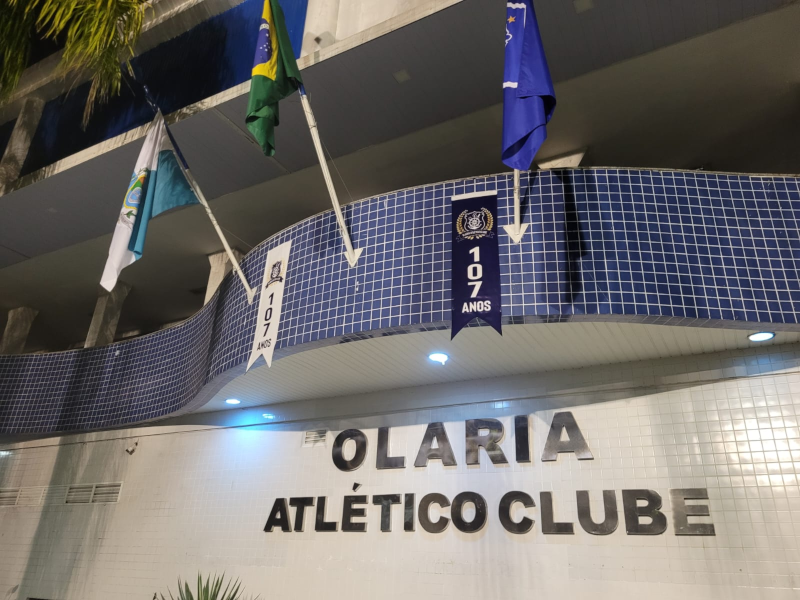
Headquarters of Olaria Atlético Clube with banners commemorating the 107 years of the club

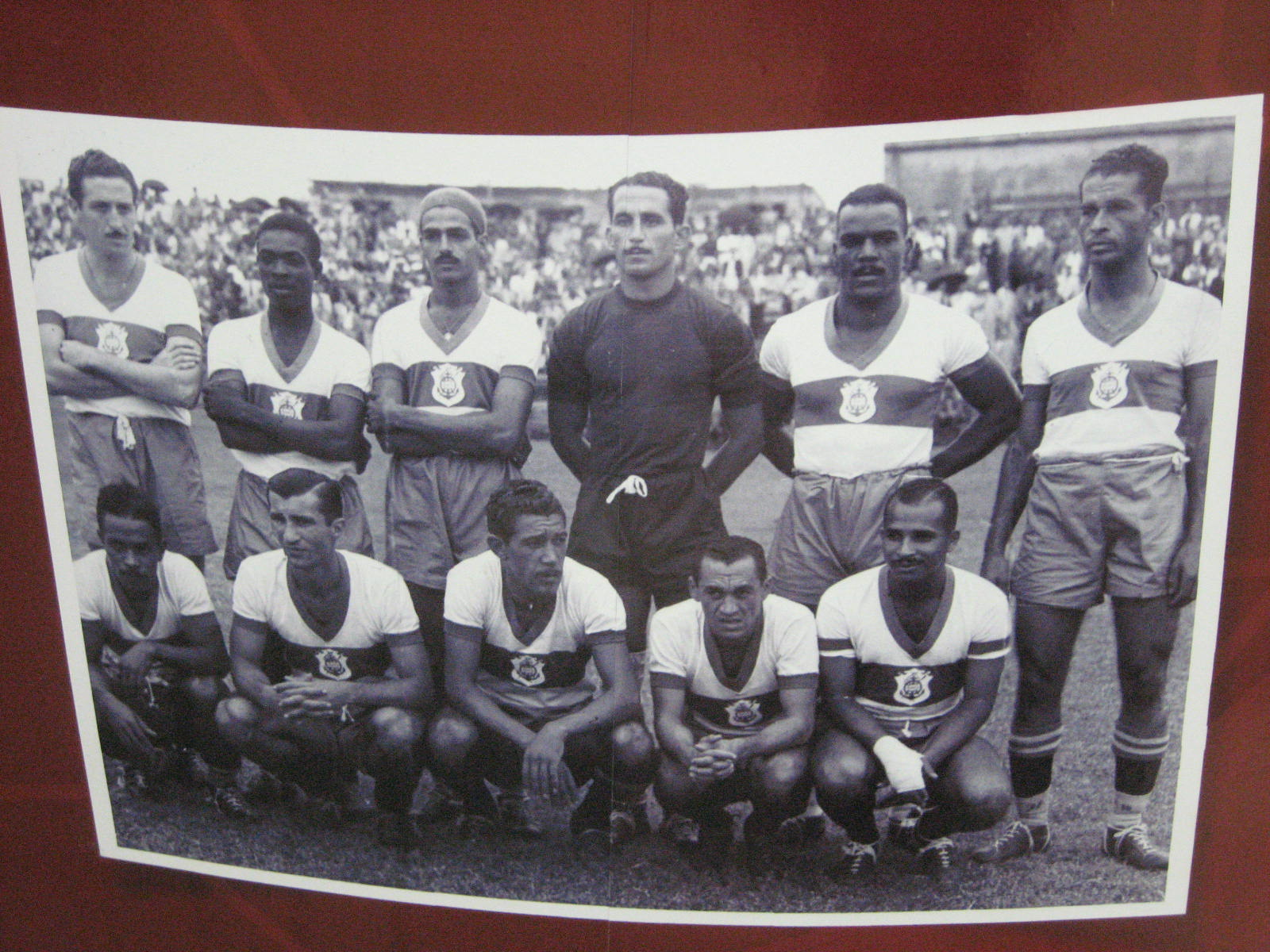
Olaria Atlético Clube in the 50's

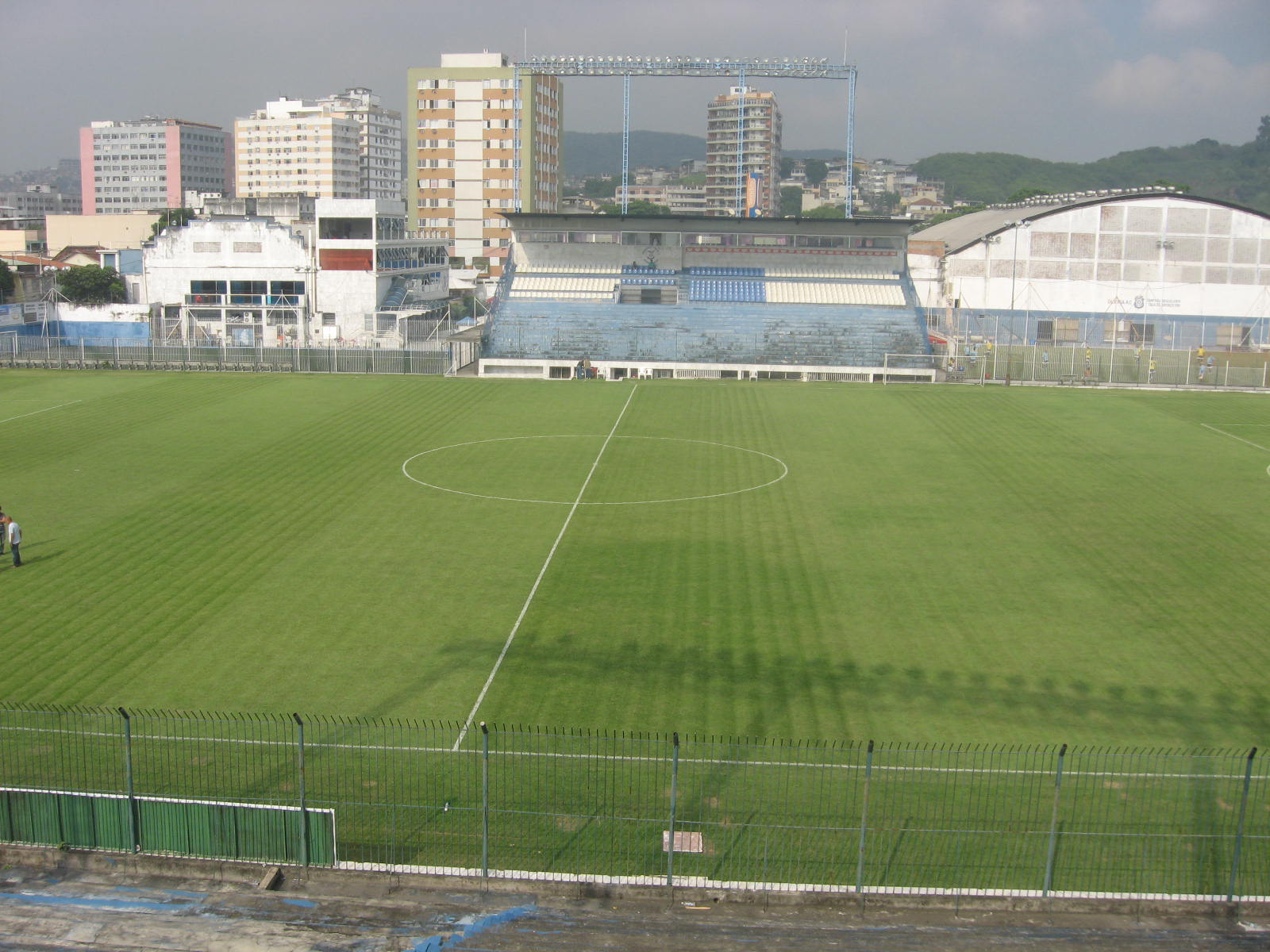
The Mourão Filho stadium, more known as Rua Bariri

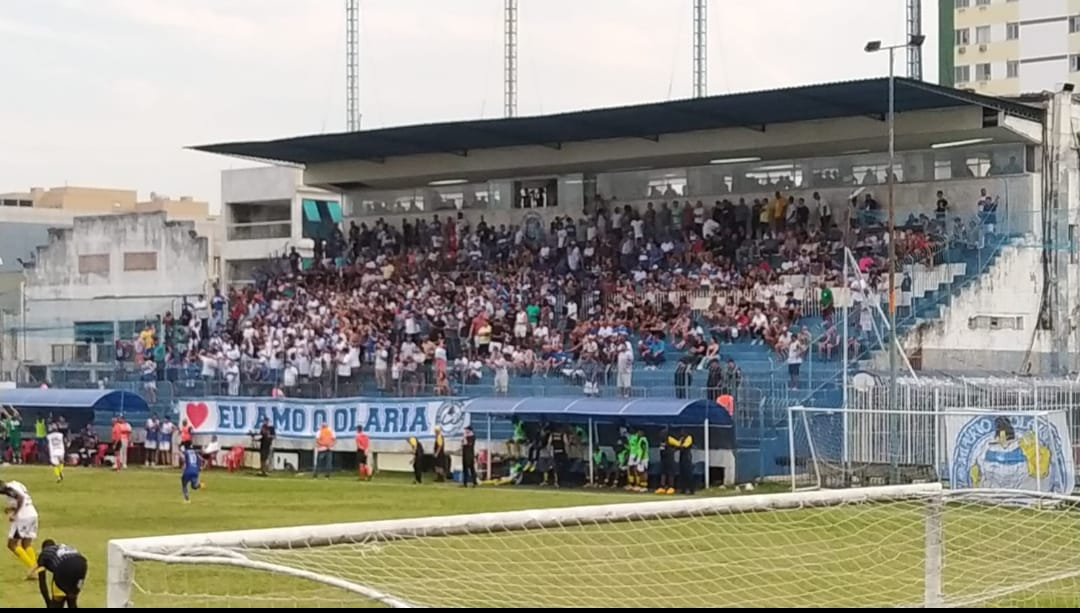
Fans of Olaria in 2022

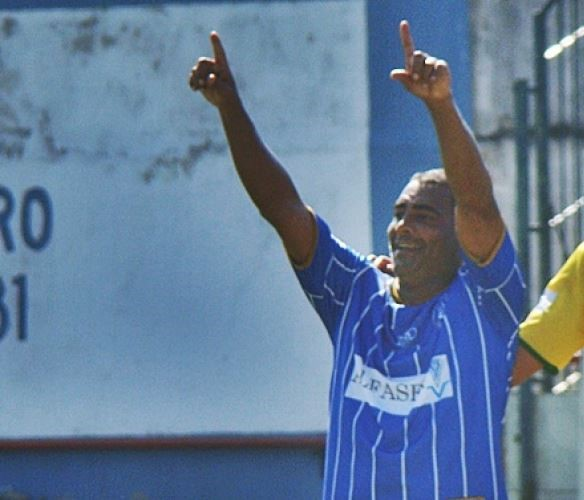
Romário using an Olaria shirt

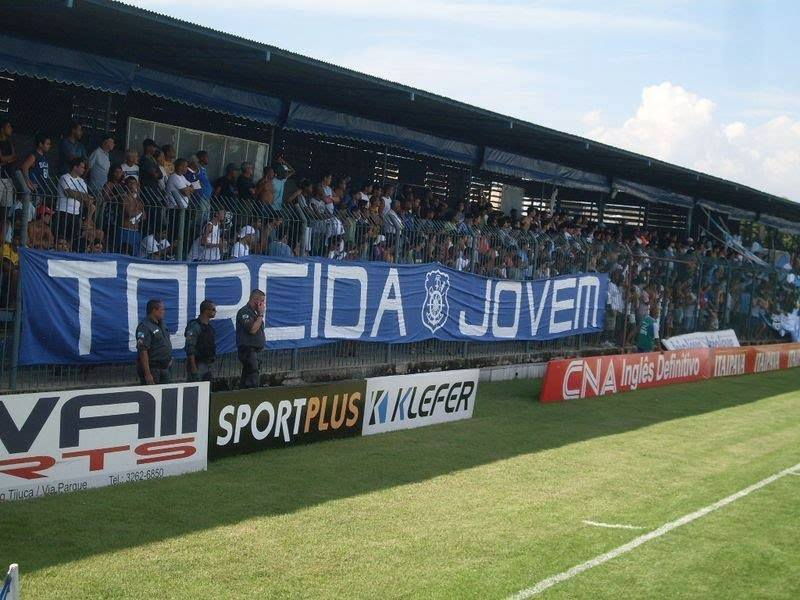
"Torcida Jovem" of Olaria
