= Bartoli =

Bartoli is an Italian surname. Notable people with the surname include:

- Adolfo Bartoli (1851–1896), Italian physicist
- Alberto Leoncini Bartoli (1932–2025), Italian diplomat
- Alfonso Bartoli (1874–1957), archaeologist, teacher, and Italian politician
- Amerigo Bartoli Natinguerra (1890–1971), Italian painter, caricaturist, and writer
- Cecilia Bartoli (born 1966), Italian opera singer
- Cosimo Bartoli (1503–1572), Italian diplomat, mathematician, philologist, and humanist
- Daniello Bartoli (1608–1685), Italian Jesuit writer and historian
- Domenico Bartoli (1912–1989), Italian journalist and essayist
- Elisa Bartoli (born 1991), Italian football defender
- Francesco Bartoli (1745–1806), Italian actor, playwright, and writer
- Giovanni Bartoli, 14th-century Italian sculptor and jewelmaker
- Giuseppe Bartoli (1717–1788), Italian antiquarian and literary scholar
- Jenifer Bartoli (born 1982), French pop singer (part-Corsican extraction)
- Luciano Bartoli (1946–2019), Italian actor
- Marion Bartoli (born 1984), French tennis player (Corsican descent)
- Marisa Bartoli (1942–2024), Italian actress
- Massimiliano Bartoli, Italian chef and restaurateur
- Matteo Bartoli (1873–1946), Italian linguist
- Michele Bartoli (born 1970), Italian cyclist
- Ninetta Bartoli (1896–1978), first woman mayor in Italy
- Petrus Draghi Bartoli (1646–1695), Italian Roman Catholic prelate, Patriarch of Alexandria
- Pietro Santi Bartoli (1615–1700), Italian engraver, draughtsman and painter
- Sandro Ivo Bartoli (born 1970), Italian pianist
- Sara Bartoli (born c. 1980), known as the "Angel Baby Who Protected the Pope"
- Taddeo Bartoli or Taddeo di Bartolo (c. 1363–1422), Italian painter
- Teodora Ricci-Bàrtoli (1750–1806), Italian actress
- Vito Andrés Bártoli (1929–2019), Argentine footballer and manager

Fictional characters:

- Marco Bartoli, cult leader and the main villain of Tomb Raider II

== See also ==
- Bartolini (surname)
- Bartholdi (surname)
