= Barbolini =

Barbolini is an Italian surname. Notable people with the surname include:

- Giorgio Barbolini (1934–2022), Italian soccer player
- Giuliano Barbolini (born 1945), Italian politician
- Massimo Barbolini (born 1964), Italian volleyball coach

== See also ==
- Bartolini
