= Bartolini (disambiguation) =

Bartolini is an Italian surname.

Bartolini may also refer to:

- 12399 Bartolini, an asteroid
- Bartolini Salimbeni Annunciation, a tempera on panel painting by Lorenzo Monaco
- Bartolini Salimbeni Chapel, a chapel in the church of Santa Trinita, Florence, Italy
- Bartolini Tondo, a tempera-on-panel painting by Filippo Lippi

== Other uses ==
- Bartolini, an Italian courier
- Bartolini (guitar brand), an Italian guitar brand established in 1955 by Alvaro Bartolini.
- Bartolini Pickups and Electronics, an American bass guitar pickup brand since 1973/1978 by Bartolini, Inc.

== See also ==
- Palazzo Bartolini (disambiguation)
- Bartoli
- Bartholin (disambiguation)
- Bertolini
