= Palazzo Bartolini =

Palazzo Bartolini may refer to the following buildings:

- Palazzo Bartolini Salimbeni, palazzo in Florence, Italy
- Palazzo Bartolini-Torrigiani, palazzo in Florence, Italy

== See also ==
- Bartolini (disambiguation)
