= 1956 Small Club World Cup =

Tournament details
- Host country: Venezuela
- Dates: 30 June – 19 July
- Teams: 4 (from 2 associations)
- Venue: 1 (in 1 host city)

Final positions
- Champions: (Spain) Real Madrid (2nd title)

Tournament statistics
- Matches played: 12
- Goals scored: 37 (3.08 per match)
- Top scorer(s): (Argentina) Alfredo Di Stéfano (Brazil) Vavá (Brazil) Sabará (4 goals each)

The 1956 Small Club World Cup was the fifth edition of the Small Club World Cup, a tournament held in Venezuela between 1952 and 1957, in certain years between 1963 and 1970, and in 1975. It was played by four participants, 3 from Europe and 1 from South America in double round robin format, and featured players like Alfredo Di Stéfano, Héctor Rial, Francisco Gento, Miguel Muñoz for Real Madrid, Uruguayan Alcides Ghiggia for Roma, Vavá for Vasco da Gama, Hernâni Silva, and Virgílio Mendes for Porto. This was Di Stéfano's second participation and trophy and his first with Real Madrid.

Real Madrid crowned champion of the competition, achieving their second Small World Cup trophy, while Argentines Alfredo Di Stéfano and Héctor Rial, along with Brazilians Vavá and Sabará, were the topscorers with 4 goals each.

== Participants ==
Team	Qualification
(Portugal) Porto	Champion of 1955–56 Primeira Divisão
(Spain) Real Madrid	3rd. in 1955–56 La Liga and champion of 1955–56 European Cup
(Italy) Roma	6th. in 1955–56 Serie A
(Brazil) Vasco da Gama	Runner-up in 1955 Campeonato Carioca

== Matches ==
30 June

Porto (Portugal)	1–1	(Italy) Roma
Teixeira 22'	Report	Nyers 58'

Estadio Olímpico, Caracas
Referee: Benito Jackson (Venezuela)

1 July

Real Madrid (Spain)	5–2	(Brazil) Vasco da Gama
Joseíto 15'; Marsal 32'; Rial 37'; Di Stéfano 50', 57'	Report	Laerte 4'; Vavá 40'

Estadio Olímpico, Caracas
Referee: Lires López (Argentina)

3 July

Vasco da Gama (Brazil)	3–0	(Portugal) Porto
Sabará 5'; Vavá 28', 65'	Report

Estadio Olímpico, Caracas
Referee: Héctor Osorio (Venezuela)

4 July

Roma (Italy)	2–1	(Spain) Real Madrid
Giuliano 10', 38'	Report	Rial 20'

Estadio Olímpico, Caracas
Referee: Lires López (Argentina)

7 July

Vasco da Gama (Brazil)	3–1	(Italy) Roma
Vavá 55'; Sabará 64'; Pinga 69'	Report	Costa 80'

Estadio Olímpico, Caracas
Referee: Benito Jackson (Venezuela)

8 July

Real Madrid (Spain)	2–1	(Portugal) Porto
Rial 34'; Joseíto 80'	Report	Teixeira 27'

Estadio Olímpico, Caracas
Referee: Lires López (Argentina)

10 July

Porto (Portugal)	1–0	(Brazil) Vasco da Gama
Hernâni 42'	Report

Estadio Olímpico, Caracas
Referee: Isidoro Trapote (Venezuela)

12 July

Real Madrid (Spain)	2–1	(Italy) Roma
Di Stéfano 10', 20'	Report	Lojodice 66'

Estadio Olímpico, Caracas
Referee: Lires López (Argentina)

14 July

Vasco da Gama (Brazil)	2–1	(Italy) Roma
Laerte 10'; Vavá 30'	Report	Barbolini 55'

Estadio Olímpico, Caracas
Referee: Isidoro Trapote (Venezuela)

15 July

Real Madrid (Spain)	2–1	(Portugal) Porto
Rial 10'; Marsal 50'	Report	Hernâni 36'

Estadio Olímpico, Caracas
Referee: Isidoro Trapote (Venezuela)

17 July

Porto (Portugal)	1–0	(Italy) Roma
Jaburu 49'	Report

Estadio Olímpico, Caracas
Referee: Isidoro Trapote (Venezuela)

19 July

Vasco da Gama (Brazil)	2–2	(Spain) Real Madrid
Sabará 52', 71'	Report	Dario 61' (o.g.); Rial 70'

Estadio Olímpico, Caracas
Referee: Isidoro Trapote (Venezuela)

== Final standings ==
Team	Pts	P	W	D	L	GF	GA	GD
(Spain) Real Madrid	9	6	4	1	1	14	9	5
(Brazil) Vasco da Gama	7	6	3	1	2	12	10	2
(Portugal) Porto	5	6	2	1	3	5	8	-3
(Italy) Roma	3	6	1	1	4	6	10	-4

== Topscorers ==
Rank	Player	Club	Goals
1	(Argentina) Alfredo Di Stéfano	(Spain) Real Madrid	4
1	(Argentina) Héctor Rial	(Spain) Real Madrid	4
1	(Brazil) Sabará	(Brazil) Vasco da Gama	4
1	(Brazil) Vavá	(Brazil) Vasco da Gama	4

== Champion ==
1955 Small Club World Cup
(Francoist Spain)
Real Madrid
2nd. title
