= List of international goals scored by Alfredo Di Stéfano =

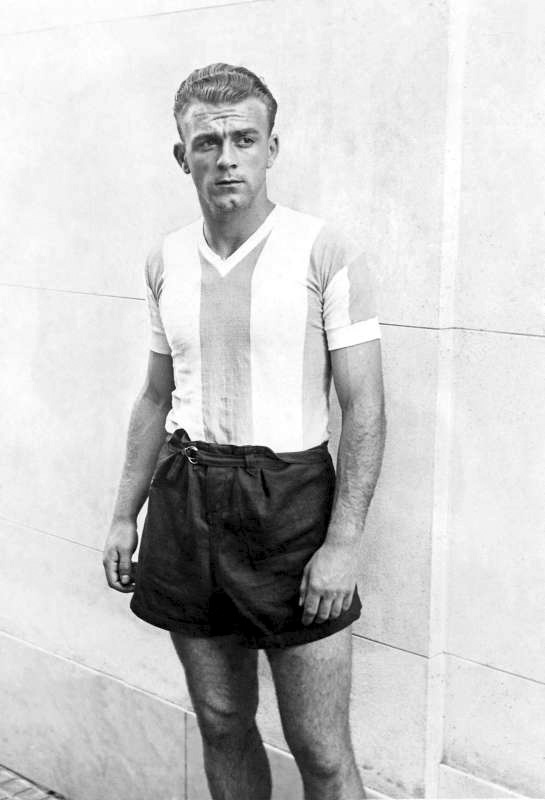
Di Stéfano kitted out for Argentina in 1947: he played 6 times for his native country, before appearing 31 times for Spain.

Alfredo Di Stéfano was an Argentine-born professional footballer who played for both Argentina and Spain between 1947 and 1961, and scored 29 international goals during that time. He played as a deep-lying forward, and is considered one of the best players of all time. Di Stéfano was one of the first footballers to control matches by roaming the pitch, unusual in an era when most players did not stray from their set position. He was twice awarded the Ballon d'Or as European football's player of the year; in 1957 and 1959.

Di Stéfano made his international debut for Argentina in December 1947, scoring a goal during a 7–0 win against Bolivia. He scored six goals, including his first international hat-trick—against Colombia—during his six appearances for Argentina. These all came during the 1947 South American Championship, (Note: The South American Championship was the predecessor to the Copa América.) which Argentina won. In 1949, he was one of many Argentine players who left the country to play in an unsanctioned Colombian league which paid higher wages than those available in his native country. During his time there, he appeared four times for Colombia in matches that are not recognised by FIFA. He moved to Real Madrid in 1953, and gained Spanish citizenship three years later.

He debuted for Spain in January 1957, scoring a hat-trick in a friendly against the Netherlands. Generally, he was less successful internationally than with Real Madrid; The Guardian's Brian Glanville suggested that he was unable to dictate play within the defensive structure established by Spain's manager Helenio Herrera. Nevertheless, he scored 23 goals in 31 matches for his adopted country, becoming Spain's leading goal-scorer, which he remained until Emilio Butragueño surpassed his total in 1990.

Di Stéfano scored more goals against Chile than any other team, doing so five times: once for Argentina and four times for Spain. He was most prolific at the Estadio George Capwell and Santiago Bernabéu stadiums, scoring six goals at each. Of Di Stéfano's 29 goals, 16 were scored in friendlies. In competitive matches, he scored six times in the South American Championship, four times in FIFA World Cup qualification matches, and three times in his two UEFA European Championship qualification matches.

== International goals ==
- Di Stefano's team's score listed first, score column indicates score after each Di Stefano goal.

International goals by Alfredo Di Stéfano
| No. | Team | Cap | Date | Venue | Opponent | Score | Result | Competition | Ref |
|---|---|---|---|---|---|---|---|---|---|
| 1 | Argentina | 1 | 4 December 1947 | Estadio George Capwell, Guayaquil, Ecuador | Bolivia | 6–0 | 7–0 | 1947 South American Championship | |
| 2 | Argentina | 2 | 11 December 1947 | Estadio George Capwell, Guayaquil, Ecuador | Peru | 2–1 | 3–2 | 1947 South American Championship | |
| 3 | Argentina | 3 | 16 December 1947 | Estadio George Capwell, Guayaquil, Ecuador | Chile | 1–0 | 1–1 | 1947 South American Championship | |
| 4 | Argentina | 4 | 18 December 1947 | Estadio George Capwell, Guayaquil, Ecuador | Colombia | 2–0 | 6–0 | 1947 South American Championship | |
| 5 | Argentina | 4 | 18 December 1947 | Estadio George Capwell, Guayaquil, Ecuador | Colombia | 5–0 | 6–0 | 1947 South American Championship | |
| 6 | Argentina | 4 | 18 December 1947 | Estadio George Capwell, Guayaquil, Ecuador | Colombia | 6–0 | 6–0 | 1947 South American Championship | |
| 7 | Spain | 1 | 30 January 1957 | Santiago Bernabéu, Madrid, Spain | Netherlands | 2–0 | 5–1 | Friendly | |
| 8 | Spain | 1 | 30 January 1957 | Santiago Bernabéu, Madrid, Spain | Netherlands | 4–0 | 5–1 | Friendly | |
| 9 | Spain | 1 | 30 January 1957 | Santiago Bernabéu, Madrid, Spain | Netherlands | 5–1 | 5–1 | Friendly | |
| 10 | Spain | 3 | 31 March 1957 | King Baudouin Stadium, Brussels, Belgium | Belgium | 1–0 | 5–0 | Friendly | |
| 11 | Spain | 3 | 31 March 1957 | King Baudouin Stadium, Brussels, Belgium | Belgium | 4–0 | 5–0 | Friendly | |
| 12 | Spain | 7 | 24 November 1957 | Stade Olympique de la Pontaise, Lausanne, Switzerland | Switzerland | 2–0 | 4–1 | 1958 FIFA World Cup qualification | |
| 13 | Spain | 7 | 24 November 1957 | Stade Olympique de la Pontaise, Lausanne, Switzerland | Switzerland | 3–0 | 4–1 | 1958 FIFA World Cup qualification | |
| 14 | Spain | 10 | 13 April 1958 | Santiago Bernabéu, Madrid, Spain | Portugal | 1–0 | 1–0 | Friendly | |
| 15 | Spain | 12 | 28 February 1959 | Stadio Olimpico, Rome, Italy | Italy | 1–0 | 1–1 | Friendly | |
| 16 | Spain | 13 | 28 June 1959 | Stadion Slaski, Chorzów, Poland | Poland | 2–1 | 4–2 | 1960 European Nations' Cup qualifying | |
| 17 | Spain | 13 | 28 June 1959 | Stadion Slaski, Chorzów, Poland | Poland | 4–1 | 4–2 | 1960 European Nations' Cup qualifying | |
| 18 | Spain | 14 | 14 October 1959 | Santiago Bernabéu, Madrid, Spain | Poland | 1–0 | 3–0 | 1960 European Nations' Cup qualifying | |
| 19 | Spain | 15 | 22 November 1959 | Mestalla, Valencia, Spain | Austria | 1–0 | 6–3 | Friendly | |
| 20 | Spain | 15 | 22 November 1959 | Mestalla, Valencia, Spain | Austria | 5–2 | 6–3 | Friendly | |
| 21 | Spain | 17 | 13 March 1960 | Camp Nou, Barcelona, Spain | Italy | 2–1 | 3–1 | Friendly | |
| 22 | Spain | 19 | 10 July 1960 | Estadio Nacional, Lima, Peru | Peru | 1–0 | 3–1 | Friendly | |
| 23 | Spain | 20 | 14 July 1960 | Estadio Nacional, Santiago, Chile | Chile | 1–0 | 4–0 | Friendly | |
| 24 | Spain | 20 | 14 July 1960 | Estadio Nacional, Santiago, Chile | Chile | 2–0 | 4–0 | Friendly | |
| 25 | Spain | 21 | 17 July 1960 | Estadio Nacional, Santiago, Chile | Chile | 1–0 | 4–1 | Friendly | |
| 26 | Spain | 21 | 17 July 1960 | Estadio Nacional, Santiago, Chile | Chile | 2–0 | 4–1 | Friendly | |
| 27 | Spain | 26 | 19 April 1961 | Ninian Park, Cardiff, Wales | Wales | 2–1 | 2–1 | 1962 FIFA World Cup qualification | |
| 28 | Spain | 28 | 11 June 1961 | Ramón Sánchez Pizjuán, Seville, Spain | Argentina | 2–0 | 2–0 | Friendly | |
| 29 | Spain | 30 | 23 November 1961 | Santiago Bernabéu, Madrid, Spain | Morocco | 2–1 | 3–2 | 1962 FIFA World Cup qualification | |

== Statistics ==
Goals by year
| Year | Apps | Goals |
|---|---|---|
| 1947 | 6 | 6 |
| 1957 | 7 | 7 |
| 1958 | 4 | 1 |
| 1959 | 5 | 6 |
| 1960 | 8 | 6 |
| 1961 | 7 | 3 |
| Total | 37 | 29 |

Goals by competition
| Competition | Apps | Goals |
|---|---|---|
| Friendlies | 21 | 16 |
| South American Championship | 6 | 6 |
| FIFA World Cup qualification | 8 | 4 |
| UEFA European Championship qualification | 2 | 3 |
| Total | 37 | 29 |

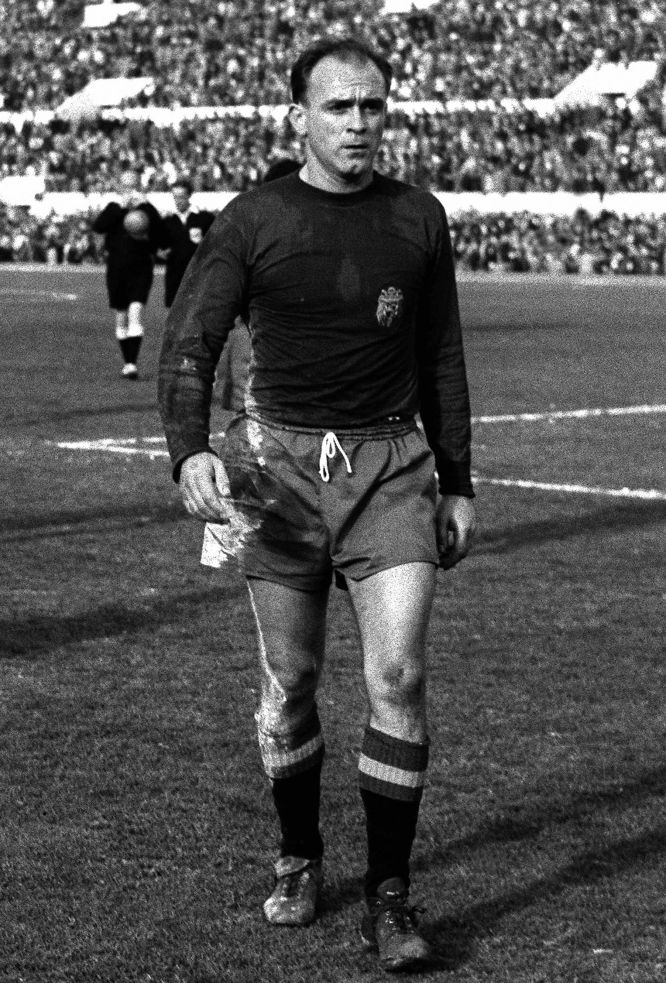
Di Stéfano playing for Spain in 1959
