= 1963–64 Real Madrid CF season =

61st season in existence of Real Madrid CF

Real Madrid CF
1963–64 season
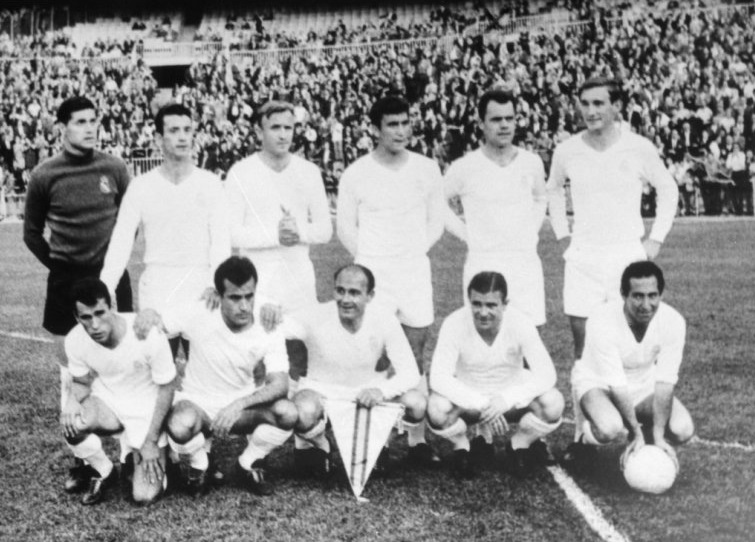
- President: Santiago Bernabéu
- Head coach: Miguel Muñoz
- Stadium: Chamartín
- Primera Division: 1st (in European Cup)
- Copa del Generalísimo: Quarter-finals
- European Cup: Runners-up
- Top goalscorer: League: Ferenc Puskás (21); All: Puskás (28)
Home colours	Away colours

The 1963–64 season was Real Madrid Club de Fútbol's 61st season in existence and the club's 32nd consecutive season in the top flight of Spanish football.

== Summary ==
Miguel Muñoz continued refreshing the squad, which he started last season, with Araquistáin as goalkeeper, Pachín, Zoco in defense, and forwards, Serena and Grosso, playing along Amancio as the beginning of a new era in the club.

The team clinched its tenth League title, the fourth in a row. In the European Cup, the squad reached the Final against Helenio Herrera's Inter losing the trophy by a 1–3 defeat. The Final was the last official match for Alfredo Di Stéfano for the club (Note: Di Stefano played on 10 June 1964 a friendly match in Rouen.) due to chairman Santiago Bernabéu choosing not to renew his contract and disagreements with head coach Miguel Muñoz over marking Inter' star Giacinto Facchetti. (Note: According to Di Stefano:"It happened what I'm afraid, they attack with Jair, pulling Pachín out of the defensive line, and Milani, pulling Santamaría. Isidro was lonely, without mission. Milani moves to the wing, pulling Santamaría out of the line, and Zoco has to go deep to the center abandoning midfield. So, they attack with 2 and we defending with 4. In the midfield they are more players. They got the game".) On 24 June 1964 the club broadcast an official statement with Di Stefano out of Real Madrid after 11 seasons, during which he won 8 League titles and 5 European Cups.

In the Copa del Generalísimo, the club reached the quarter-finals where it was defeated by Atlético Madrid (Note: Played without Di Stéfano and Puskás) in a tie-breaker match following a 3–3 aggregate draw.

== Squad ==
Note: Flags indicate national team as defined under FIFA eligibility rules; some limited exceptions apply. Players may hold more than one non-FIFA nationality.

No.	Pos.	Nation	Player
—	GK	ESP	Araquistáin
—	GK	ESP	Vicente
—	GK	ESP	Betancort
—	DF	URU	José Santamaría
—	DF	ESP	Pedro Casado
—	DF	ESP	Pachín
—	DF	ESP	Ignacio Zoco
—	DF	ESP	Isidro
—	DF	ESP	Miera
—	MF	ESP	Félix Ruiz
—	MF	ESP	Felo
—	MF	ESP	Pipi Suarez

No.	Pos.	Nation	Player
—	MF	ESP	Juan Santisteban Troyano
—	MF	FRA	Lucien Muller
—	MF	ESP	Antonio Ruiz
—	FW	ESP	Amancio Amaro
—	FW	ESP	Francisco Gento
—	FW	HUN	Ferenc Puskás
—	FW	ARG	Alfredo Di Stéfano
—	FW	TUN	Ridha bouraoui
—	FW	ESP	Manuel Bueno
—	FW	ESP	Grosso
—	FW	TCH	Yanko Daucik
—	FW	ESP	Serena

=== Transfers ===
In
Pos.	Name	From	Type
FW	Serena	Osasuna	-
GK	Betancort	Deportivo	-
MF	Santisteban	-	-
MF	Pipi Suarez	CD Malaga	-
FW	Antonio Ruiz Robles	Melilla CF	-
GK	Maestro	Plus Ultra	-
DF	Echarri	-	-
FW	Ramon Grosso	-	-
DF	Corcuera	-	-
DF	Jose Luis Lopez Peinado	-	-
DF	De Felipe	-	-
FW	Sorribas	-	-

Out
Pos.	Name	To	Type
FW	Justo Tejada	Espanyol	-
GK	Fermin	Pontevedra	-
DF	Marcos Alonso	Murcia	-
FW	Pepillo	Mallorca	-
MF	Vidal	Levante	-
MF	Villa	Zaragoza	-
GK	Moncho	UD Salamanca	-

== Competitions ==
=== La Liga ===
==== League table ====
Pos	Team	Pld	W	D	L	GF	GA	GD	Pts	Qualification or relegation
1	Real Madrid (C)	30	22	2	6	61	23	+38	46	Qualification for the European Cup preliminary round
2	Barcelona	30	19	4	7	74	38	+36	42	Invited for the Inter-Cities Fairs Cup
3	Real Betis	30	15	7	8	47	36	+11	37	Invited for the Inter-Cities Fairs Cup
4	Zaragoza	30	14	6	10	52	42	+10	34	Qualification for the Cup Winners' Cup first round (Note: Zaragoza qualified to the Cup Winners' Cup as champions of the Copa del Generalísimo.)
5	Elche	30	13	7	10	35	31	+4	33	

Source: BDFútbol
Rules for classification: 1) Points; 2) Head-to-head results; 3) Goal difference; 4) Number of goals scored
(C) Champions

==== Results by round ====
Round	1	2	3	4	5	6	7	8	9	10	11	12	13	14	15	16	17	18	19	20	21	22	23	24	25	26	27	28	29	30
Ground	H	A	H	A	H	A	H	A	H	A	H	A	H	A	H	A	H	A	H	A	H	A	H	A	H	A	H	A	H	A
Result	W	L	W	W	L	D	W	W	W	W	L	W	L	W	W	W	W	W	W	W	L	W	L	W	W	W	W	D	W	W
Position	1	8	4	4	4	5	5	4	2	2	2	2	4	4	2	2	2	2	1	1	1	1	2	1	1	1	1	1	1	1

Source: Competitive matches
A = Away; H = Home; W = Win; D = Draw; L = Loss; = Leader, 1964-65 European Cup; = 1964-65 Inter-Cities Fairs Cup

==== Matches ====
15 September 1963 1	Real Madrid	3–1	Atletico Bilbao	Madrid
	Evaristo 32'; Puskás 39'; Puskás 41'	Report	Argoitia 49'	Stadium: Chamartín; Referee: Ruiz Casasola

22 September 1963 2	Elche CF	2–0	Real Madrid	Elche
	Lezcano 47'; Oviedo 89'	Report		Stadium: Campo de Altabix; Referee: Ortiz de Mendibil

29 September 1963 3	Real Valladolid	0–3	Real Madrid	Valladolid
		Report	Puskás 40'; Gento 53'; Félix Ruiz 84'	Stadium: José Zorrilla; Referee: Lloris Antonino

5 October 1963 4	Real Madrid	5–2	Córdoba CF	Madrid
	Gento 6'; Di Stéfano 29'; Di Stéfano 35'; Di Stéfano 48'; Serena 89'	Report	Cabrera 54'; Martínez 80'	Stadium: Chamartín; Referee: Clausí

13 October 1963 5	Español	1–0	Real Madrid	Barcelona
	Mercadé 38'	Report		Stadium: Sarrià; Referee: López Zaballa

20 October 1963 6	Real Madrid	1–1	Real Betis	Madrid
	Di Stéfano 19'	Report	Molina 26'	Stadium: Chamartín; Referee: Gómez Arribas

3 November 1963 7	Valencia CF	1–4	Real Madrid	Valencia
	Waldo 28'	Report	Amancio 18'; Amancio 36'; Puskás 42'; Gento 75'	Stadium: Estadio Mestalla; Referee: Bueno Perales

9 November 1963 8	Real Madrid	3–1	Pontevedra	Madrid
	Di Stéfano 2'; Puskás 46' (pen.); Gento 83'	Report	Iglesias 53'	Stadium: Estadio Santiago Bernabéu; Referee: Simó Fiol

17 November 1963 9	Real Murcia	0–3	Real Madrid	Murcia
		Report	Puskás 5'; Gento 60'; Puskás 70'	Stadium: La Condomina; Referee: Álvarez Martínez

24 November 1963 10	Real Madrid	5–1	Atlético Madrid	Madrid
	Di Stéfano 35'; Amancio 60'; Gento 70'; Puskás 73'; Gento 89'	Report	Mendonça 26'	Stadium: Chamartín; Referee: Pintado Viu

8 December 1963 11	Real Zaragoza	3–2	Real Madrid	Zaragoza
	Marcelino 4'; Marcelino 8'; Villa 11'; Villa 53'	Report	Puskás 65'; Puskás 89' (pen.)	Stadium: La Romareda; Referee: Ruiz Casasola

15 December 1963 12	Real Madrid	4–0	FC Barcelona	Madrid
	Puskás 37'; Puskás 68'; Di Stéfano 77'; Puskás 84' (pen.)	Report		Stadium: Chamartín; Referee: Ortiz de Mendibil

22 December 1963 13	Sevilla CF	1–0	Real Madrid	Seville
	Gallego 88'	Report		Stadium: Estadio Sanchez Pizjuan; Referee: Gardeazabal Garay

29 December 1963 14	Real Madrid	3–0	Levante UD	Madrid
	Zoco 14'; Calpe 50' (own goal); Félix Ruiz 61'	Report		Stadium: Chamartín; Referee: Oliva Fortuny

5 January 1964 15	Real Oviedo	0–2	Real Madrid	Oviedo
		Report	Félix Ruiz 76'; Amancio 77'	Stadium: Carlos Tartiere; Referee: González Echeverría

12 January 1964 16	Athletic Bilbao	2–3	Real Madrid	Bilbao
	Urquijo 40'; Arieta 89'	Report	Di Stéfano 34'; Amancio 48'; Puskás 60'	Stadium: San Mamés; Referee: Lloris Antonino

19 January 1964 17	Real Madrid	1–0	Elche CF	Madrid
	Félix Ruiz 23'	Report	Forneris (red card) 9'	Stadium: Chamartín; Referee: Ortiz de Mendibil

25 January 1964 18	Real Madrid	2–1	Real Valladolid	Madrid
	Yanko 36'; Serena 67'	Report	Ramírez 65'	Stadium: Estadio Santiago Bernabéu; Referee: Morilla Martínez

2 February 1964 19	Córdoba CF	0–1	Real Madrid	Córdoba
		Report	Gento 85'	Stadium: Estadio El Arcángel; Referee: Zariquiegui Izco

8 February 1964 20	Real Madrid	1–0	Español	Madrid
	Gento 8'	Report		Stadium: Chamartín; Referee: Gardeazabal Garay

16 February 1964 21	Real Betis	1–0	Real Madrid	Seville
	Luis Aragonés 75' (pen.)	Report	Amancio 83'	Stadium: Estadio Benito Villamarín; Referee: Gardeazabal Garay

23 February 1964 22	Real Madrid	2–0	Valencia CF	Madrid
	Puskás 65'; Puskás 78'	Report		Stadium: Chamartín; Referee: Bueno Perales

1 March 1964 23	Pontevedra CF	1–0	Real Madrid	Pontevedra
	Ceresuela 43'	Report		Stadium: Estadio Municipal de Pasarón; Referee: González Echeverría

15 March 1964 25	Real Madrid	4–1	Real Murcia	Madrid
	Di Stéfano 28'; Puskás 31'; Di Stéfano 67'; Di Stéfano 71'	Report	Merodio 63'	Stadium: Chamartín; Referee: Rigo Sureda

19 March 1964 24	Atlético Madrid	0–1	Real Madrid	Madrid
		Report	Amancio 5'	Stadium: Metropolitano; Referee: Bueno Perales

22 March 1964 26	Real Madrid	3–1	Real Zaragoza	Madrid
	Puskás 5'; Puskás 31' (pen.); Gento 49'		Canario 15'	Stadium: Chamartín; Referee: Simó Fiol

30 March 1964 27	FC Barcelona	1–2	Real Madrid	Barcelona
	Zaldúa 27'	Report	Gento 18'; Puskás 43'	Stadium: Camp Nou; Referee: Ruiz Casasola

12 April 1964 28	Real Madrid	1–1	Sevilla CF	Madrid
	Amancio (red card) 77'; Puskás 87'	Report	Diéguez 34' (pen.)	Stadium: Chamartín; Referee: Martín Álvarez

19 April 1964 29	Levante UD	0–1	Real Madrid	Valencia
	Dominguez (red card) 57'	Report	Bueno 35'; Felo (red card) 57'; Felix Ruiz 11'	Stadium: Estadio de Vallejo; Referee: Bueno Perales

26 April 1964 30	Real Madrid	1–0	Real Oviedo	Madrid
	Gento 44'	Report		Stadium: Chamartín; Referee: López Zaballa

=== Copa del Generalísimo ===
==== Round of 32 ====
26 April 1964	Real Madrid	7–0	SD Indautxu	Madrid
		Report		Stadium: Chamartín

10 May 1964	SD Indautxu	2–3	Real Madrid	Bilbao
		Report		Stadium: Iparralde

==== Eightfinals ====
16 May 1964	Real Madrid	1–0	Real Sociedad	Madrid
		Report		Stadium: Chamartín

19 May 1964	Real Sociedad	0–1	Real Madrid	San Sebastián
		Report		Stadium: Atotxa

==== Quarter-finals ====
23 May 1964	Real Madrid	2–2	Atlético Madrid	Madrid
		Report		Stadium: Chamartín

31 May 1964	Atlético Madrid	1–1	Real Madrid	Madrid
		Report		Stadium: Metropolitano

3 June 1964 replay	Atlético Madrid	2–1	Real Madrid	Madrid
	Collar 36' (pen.); Mendonca 80'	Report	Grosso 23'	Stadium: Metropolitano; Referee: Ruiz Casasola

=== European Cup ===
==== Preliminary round ====
25 September 1963	Rangers (Scotland)	0–1	(Spain) Real Madrid	Glasgow
		Report	Puskás 86'	Stadium: Ibrox Stadium; Attendance: 81,215; Referee: (France) Joseph Barbéran

9 October 1963	Real Madrid (Spain)	6–0	(Scotland) Rangers	Madrid
	Puskás 3', 24', 49'; Evaristo 10'; Gento 19'; Ruiz 78'	Report		Stadium: Santiago Bernabéu Stadium; Attendance: 90,000; Referee: (France) Marcel Bois

==== Eightfinals ====
13 November 1963	Dinamo București (Romania)	1–3	(Spain) Real Madrid	Bucharest
	Ţîrcovnicu 86'	Report	Ruiz 2'; Di Stéfano 43'; Gento 87'	Stadium: 23 August Stadium; Attendance: 60,000; Referee: (Poland) Józef Kowal

18 November 1963	Real Madrid (Spain)	5–3	(Romania) Dinamo București	Madrid
	Ruiz 4'; Di Stéfano 19'; Amancio 51'; Zoco 60'; Puskás 63' (pen.)	Report	Nunweiller 25'; Frăţilă 49'; Pârcălab 71' (pen.)	Stadium: Santiago Bernabéu Stadium; Attendance: 90,000; Referee: (Italy) Cesare Jonni

==== Quarter-finals ====
29 January 1964	Real Madrid (Spain)	4–1	(Italy) Milan	Madrid
	Amancio 17'; Puskás 44'; Di Stéfano 59'; Gento 64'	Report	Lodetti 83'	Stadium: Santiago Bernabéu Stadium; Attendance: 100,000; Referee: (France) Joseph Barbéran

13 February 1964	Milan (Italy)	2–0	(Spain) Real Madrid	Milan
	Lodetti 6'; Altafini 46'	Report		Stadium: San Siro; Attendance: 80,000; Referee: (Switzerland) Gottfried Dienst

==== Semi-finals ====
22 April 1964	Zürich (Switzerland)	1–2	(Spain) Real Madrid	Zürich
	Brizzi 71'	Report	Di Stéfano 16'; Felo 25'	Stadium: Letzigrund; Attendance: 28,394; Referee: (Belgium) Joseph Hannet

7 May 1964	Real Madrid (Spain)	6–0	(Switzerland) Zürich	Madrid
	Zoco 9'; Felo 14'; Muller 16'; Puskás 70'; Di Stéfano 79'; Amancio 87'	Report		Stadium: Santiago Bernabéu Stadium; Attendance: 110,000; Referee: (France) Jean Tricot

==== Final ====
27 May 1964	Internazionale (Italy)	3–1	(Spain) Real Madrid	Wien
	Mazzola 43', 76'; Milani 61'	Report	Felo 70'	Stadium: Praterstadion; Attendance: 72,000; Referee: (Austria) Josef Stoll

== Statistics ==
=== Squad statistics ===
Competition	First match	Last match	Starting round	Final position	Record							
Competition	First match	Last match	Starting round	Final position	Pld	W	D	L	GF	GA	GD	Win %
La Liga	2 September 1963	1 April 1964	Matchday 1	Winners	30	23	3	4	83	33	+50	76.67
1963–64 Copa del Generalísimo	14 February 1964	8 June 1964	Round of 32	Quarter-finals	9	8	0	1	28	9	+19	88.89
European Cup	5 September 1963	26 May 1964	Preliminary round	Final	2	0	1	1	3	4	−1	0.00
Total					41	31	4	6	114	46	+68	75.61

Last updated: 22 September 2019
Source: Competitions

=== Players statistics ===
No.	Pos	Nat	Player	Total		Primera Division		Copa del Generalisimo		European Cup	
No.	Pos	Nat	Player	Apps	Goals	Apps	Goals	Apps	Goals	Apps	Goals
	GK	(Spain) ESP	Vicente	21	-7	15	0	1	0	5	-7
	DF	(Spain) ESP	Isidro	36	0	27	0	1	0	8	0
	DF	(Uruguay) URU	Santamaria	39	0	27	0	3	0	9	0
	DF	(Spain) ESP	Pachín	33	0	22	0	4	0	7	0
	MF	(Spain) ESP	Ruiz	22	7	17	4	0	0	5	3
	MF	(Spain) ESP	Zoco	41	4	29	1	3	0	9	3
	MF	(France) FRA	Muller	34	1	25	0	0	0	9	1
	MF	(Spain) ESP	Gento	35	15	24	12	2	0	9	3
	FW	(Spain) ESP	Amancio	35	10	24	6	3	1	8	3
	FW	(Hungary) HUN	Puskas	33	28	25	21	0	0	8	7
	FW	(Argentina) ARG	Di Stefano	34	17	24	11	1	1	9	5
	GK	(Spain) ESP	Araquistáin	23	-9	14	0	5	-5	4	-4
	DF	(Spain) ESP	Casado	24	0	15	0	5	0	4	0
	MF	(Spain) ESP	Felo	13	2	7	0	3	0	3	2
	FW	(Brazil) BRA	Evaristo	12	2	10	1	0	0	2	1
	GK	(Spain) ESP	Betancort	3	-2	1	0	2	-2		
	MF	(Spain) ESP	Ruiz	10	0	10	0				
	FW	(Spain) ESP	Bueno	9	3	6	1	3	2		
	FW	(Spain) ESP	Grosso	6	3	0	0	6	3		
	DF	(Spain) ESP	Miera	11	0	4	0	7	0		
	FW	(Czechoslovakia) TCH	Yanko	10	5	3	1	7	4		
	MF	(Spain) ESP	Pipi Suarez	8	2	1	0	7	2		
	MF	(Spain) ESP	Santisteban	3	0	3	0				
	FW	(Spain) ESP	Serena	12	4	7	2	5	2		
	FW	(Spain) ESP	Robles	1	0	0	0	1	0		
	DF	(Spain) ESP	Echarri	4	0	0	0	4	0		
	DF	(Spain) ESP	Corcuera	1	0	0	0	1	0		
	DF	(Spain) ESP	José Luis	1	0	0	0	1	0		
	FW	(Spain) ESP	De Felipe	2	0	0	0	2	0		
	FW	(Spain) ESP	Sorribas	1	0	0	0	1	0		

- Source: https://www.bdfutbol.com/en/t/t1963-642.html
