= 1947 Argentine Primera División =

56th season of top-tier football league in Argentina

Primera División
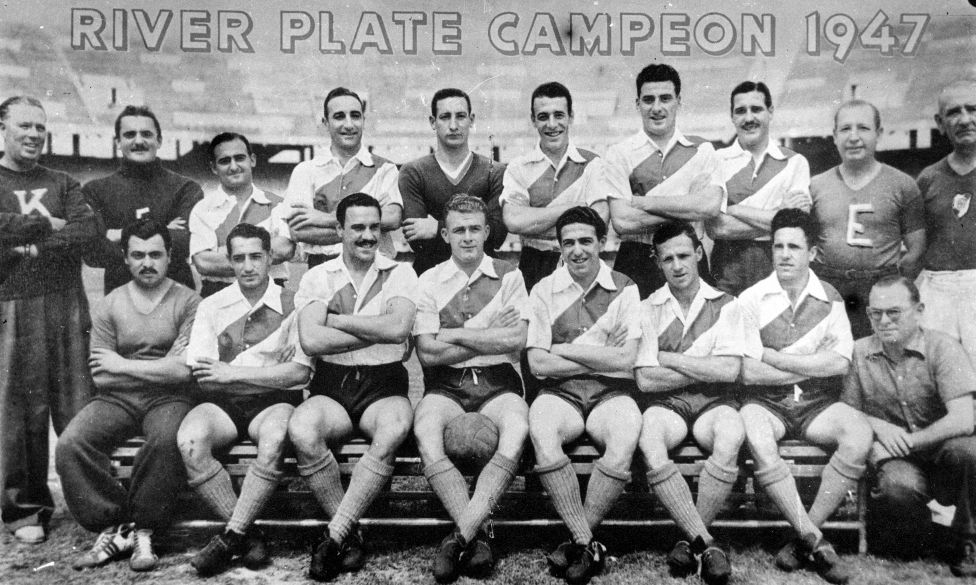
- River Plate, champions
- Season: 1947
- Champions: River Plate (9th title)
- Promoted: Banfield
- Relegated: Atlanta
- 1947 Copa Aldao: River Plate
- Top goalscorer: (Argentina) Alfredo Di Stéfano (27 goals)

The 1947 Argentine Primera División was the 56th season of top-flight football in Argentina. The season began on April 13 and ended on November 16.

Banfield returned to Primera while Atlanta was relegated. River Plate won its 9th title.

== League standings ==
Pos	Team	Pld	W	D	L	GF	GA	GD	Pts
1	River Plate	30	22	4	4	90	37	+53	48
2	Boca Juniors	30	17	8	5	70	43	+27	42
3	Independiente	30	17	7	6	66	42	+24	41
4	Estudiantes (LP)	30	15	7	8	64	35	+29	37
4	San Lorenzo	30	13	11	6	71	43	+28	37
6	Racing	30	15	6	9	63	45	+18	36
7	Chacarita Juniors	30	14	4	12	66	52	+14	32
8	Vélez Sársfield	30	11	7	12	51	44	+7	29
9	Platense	30	9	8	13	38	54	−16	26
10	Rosario Central	30	9	7	14	55	68	−13	25
11	Huracán	30	10	4	16	59	73	−14	24
11	Newell's Old Boys	30	7	10	13	45	63	−18	24
13	Lanús	30	7	7	16	46	70	−24	21
14	Tigre	30	6	8	16	48	80	−32	20
14	Banfield	30	7	6	17	40	80	−40	20
16	Atlanta	30	4	10	16	31	74	−43	18
