= Super Ballon d'Or =

Association football award

Super Ballon D'Or
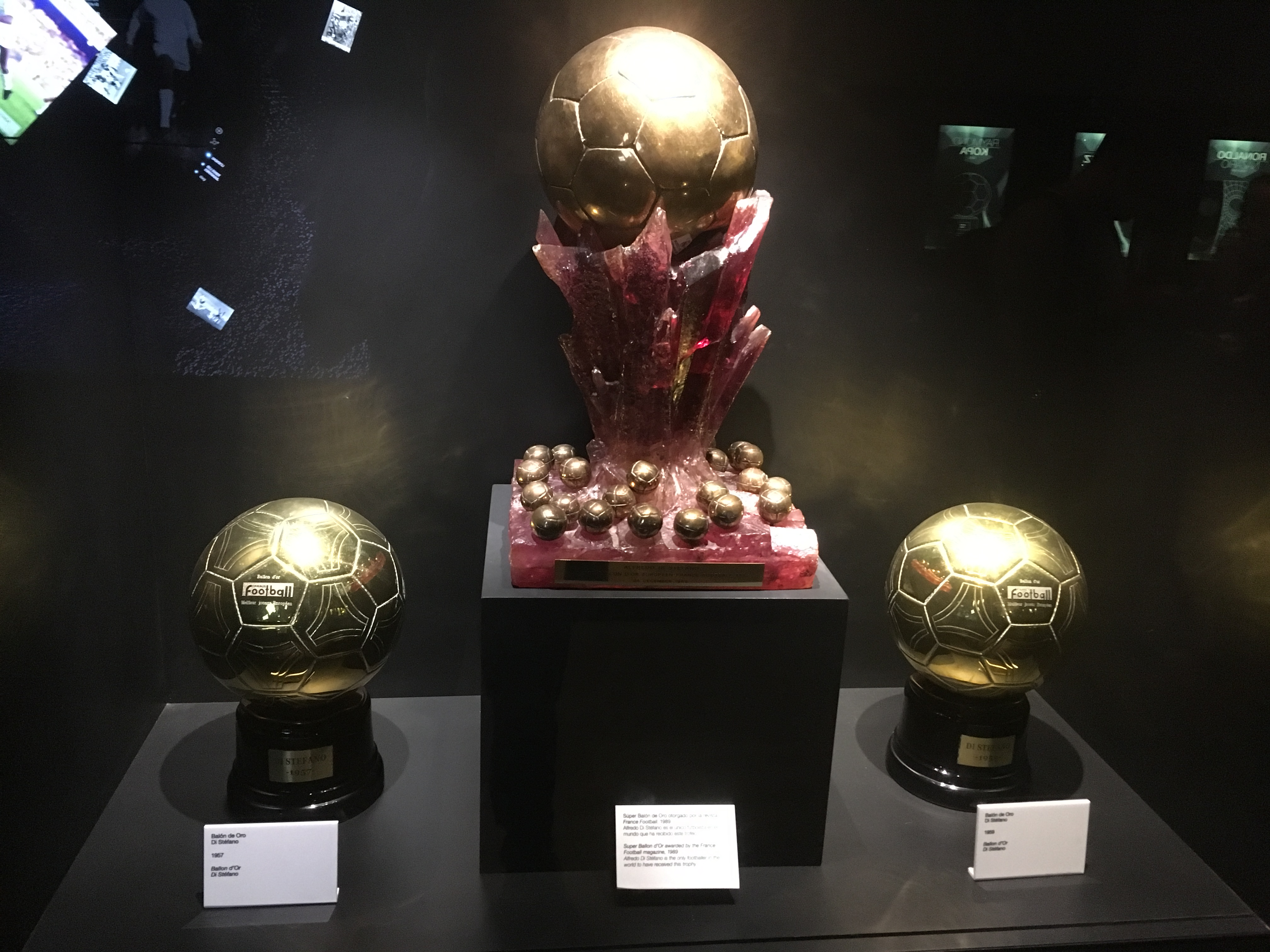
- Alfredo Di Stéfano's Super Ballon d'Or (center) and two Ballon d'Or trophies on the right and left
- Date: 24 December 1989; 36 years ago
- Country: France
- Presented by: France Football
- Eligibility: Multiple-time Ballon d'Or winner
- First award: 1989
- Winner: Alfredo Di Stéfano

The Super Ballon d'Or (French: Super Ballon d'Or) is the name of a prize that was awarded only once on 24 December 1989, by the French magazine France Football for the best football player of the previous three decades. It is even more exclusive than the prestigious Ballon d'Or.

As of November 1989, this award has only been given once, to Spanish-Argentine forward Alfredo Di Stéfano. The award was voted between multiple-time Ballon d'Or winners. The winner of the award was voted by viewers and readers, a panel of France Football judges, and former Ballon d'Or winners. The viewers and readers voted Michel Platini as the best, but the France Football jury and former Ballon d'Or winners chose Alfredo Di Stéfano.

For many years, his Super Ballon d'Or trophy was on display at the Real Madrid museum at Santiago Bernabéu Stadium, but in 2021, Di Stéfano's children auctioned off his memorabilia. The trophy was among the items sold to an anonymous buyer for £187,500, and its current location is unknown.

== Rankings ==
=== Winners ===
Super Ballon d'Or
Year	Rank	Player
1989	1st	(Spain) Alfredo Di Stéfano
1989	2nd	(Netherlands) Johan Cruyff
1989	3rd	(France) Michel Platini

=== Votes ===
Votes

France Football's jury
Rank	Player	Points
1st	(Spain) Alfredo Di Stéfano	11
2nd	(Netherlands) Johan Cruyff	9
3rd	(France) Michel Platini	5
4th	(West Germany) Franz Beckenbauer	2
5th	(West Germany) Karl-Heinz Rummenigge	0
5th	(England) Kevin Keegan	0

Former Ballon d'Or Winners
Rank	Player	Points
1st	(Spain) Alfredo Di Stéfano	8
2nd	(Netherlands) Johan Cruyff	6
3rd	(France) Michel Platini	3
4th	(West Germany) Franz Beckenbauer	2
5th	(West Germany) Karl-Heinz Rummenigge	0
5th	(England) Kevin Keegan	0

Viewers and Readers
Rank	Player	Points
1st	(France) Michel Platini	54,12%
2nd	(Netherlands) Johan Cruyff	25,31%
3rd	(West Germany) Franz Beckenbauer	10,60%
4th	(Spain) Alfredo Di Stéfano	6,40%
5th	(West Germany) Karl-Heinz Rummenigge	1,42%
6th	(England) Kevin Keegan	0,96%

== See also ==
- Ballon d'Or
- FIFA Ballon d'Or
- Ballon d'Or Féminin
- Ballon d'Or Dream Team
