= Alfredo Di Stéfano =

Argentine footballer (1926–2014)

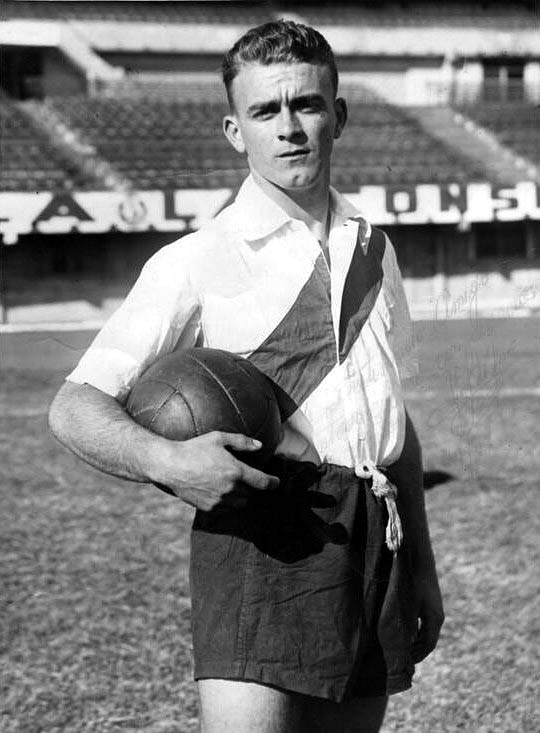
- Di Stefano with River Plate

Personal information
- Full name: Alfredo Stéfano Di Stéfano Laulhé
- Date of birth: 4 July 1926
- Place of birth: Buenos Aires, Argentina
- Date of death: 7 July 2014 (aged 88)
- Place of death: Madrid, Spain
- Height: 1.78 m (5 ft 10 in)
- Positions: Forward; midfielder

Youth career
- 1940–1943: Unión Progresista
- 1944–1945: River Plate

Senior career*
Years	Team	Apps	(Gls)
1945–1949	River Plate	66	(49)
1945–1946	→ Huracán (loan)	25	(10)
1949–1953	Millonarios	101	(90)
1953–1964	Real Madrid	282	(216)
1964–1966	Espanyol	47	(11)
Total		521	(376)

International career
1947	Argentina	6	(6)
1951	Colombia	4	(0)
1957–1961	Spain	31	(23)

Managerial career
- 1967–1968: Elche
- 1969–1970: Boca Juniors
- 1970–1974: Valencia
- 1974: Sporting CP
- 1975–1976: Rayo Vallecano
- 1976–1977: Castellón
- 1979–1980: Valencia
- 1981–1982: River Plate
- 1982–1984: Real Madrid
- 1985: Boca Juniors
- 1986–1988: Valencia
- 1990–1991: Real Madrid
Medal record
Men's football
Representing Argentina
Copa América
Winner	1947 Ecuador
- * Club domestic league appearances and goals

Alfredo Stéfano Di Stéfano Laulhé (Note: Spanish pronunciation: [alˈfɾeðo ðjesˈtefano]) (4 July 1926 – 7 July 2014) was an Argentine and Spanish professional footballer and manager who played as a forward. (Note: Attributed to multiple references:) Nicknamed "Saeta Rubia" ("The Blond Arrow"), he played in all five of Madrid's European Cup victories during the 1950s and 1960s. He played international football for Argentina and Colombia before becoming a naturalised citizen of Spain and playing for its national team. He is widely regarded as one of the greatest footballers of all time and the greatest Real Madrid player ever. He is currently the only player to win the Super Ballon d'Or.

Di Stéfano began his club career at age 17 with Argentina's River Plate in 1943. Due to a footballers' strike in Argentina in 1949, he transferred to Millonarios of Bogotá in the Colombian league until 1953, when he left for Real Madrid. He scored a total of 216 league goals for Real Madrid, a club record at the time. In 1964, Di Stefano signed with Espanyol and played for them for the remainder of his career until retiring at the age of 40 in 1966.

At the international level, Di Stéfano helped Argentina win the Copa América in 1947. However, although having played for three different national teams, he never played a single match at the FIFA World Cup during his career. His 49 goals in the European Cup was the highest of any player at the time. He was awarded the Ballon d'Or in 1957 and 1959. He is currently the seventh highest scorer in the history of Spain's top division, and places fourth on Real Madrid's highest league goalscorer of all time. He is Madrid's joint leading goalscorer in the history of El Clásico, alongside Cristiano Ronaldo.

In November 2003, to celebrate UEFA's Jubilee, Di Stéfano was selected as the Golden Player of Spain by the Royal Spanish Football Federation as their most outstanding player of the past 50 years. He was voted fourth, behind Pelé, Diego Maradona, and Johan Cruyff, in a vote organized by France Football magazine which consulted their former Ballon d'Or winners to elect the Football Player of the Century. In 1989, Di Stefano was awarded the Super Ballon d'Or, given to the best player of the previous three decades, and is currently the award's only ever recipient. He was also named at fourth in the list of "Greatest male players of the century" by the IFFHS. In 2004, he was named by Pelé in the FIFA 100 list of the world's greatest living players. In 2008 Di Stéfano was honoured by both UEFA and Real Madrid with a special Presidents' award issued by FIFA at a ceremony in Madrid, where a statue was also unveiled.

== Early life ==
Alfredo Di Stéfano was born in the Buenos Aires neighborhood of Barracas. His father, also named Alfredo Di Stéfano, was a first-generation Italian Argentine. His mother, Eulalia Laulhé Gilmont, was an Argentine woman of French and Irish descent. (Note: Attributed to multiple references:) Di Stéfano's father had played for River Plate as a defender, and introduced the young Di Stéfano to football. Di Stéfano grew up playing street football on neighbourhood teams, and his talent drew attention. In 1940, his family moved to the countryside, where he played for Unión Progresista with his brother Tulio. In 1943, the family returned to Buenos Aires. Di Stéfano's football idol in his youth was Arsenio Erico of Paraguay.

== Club career ==
=== River Plate ===
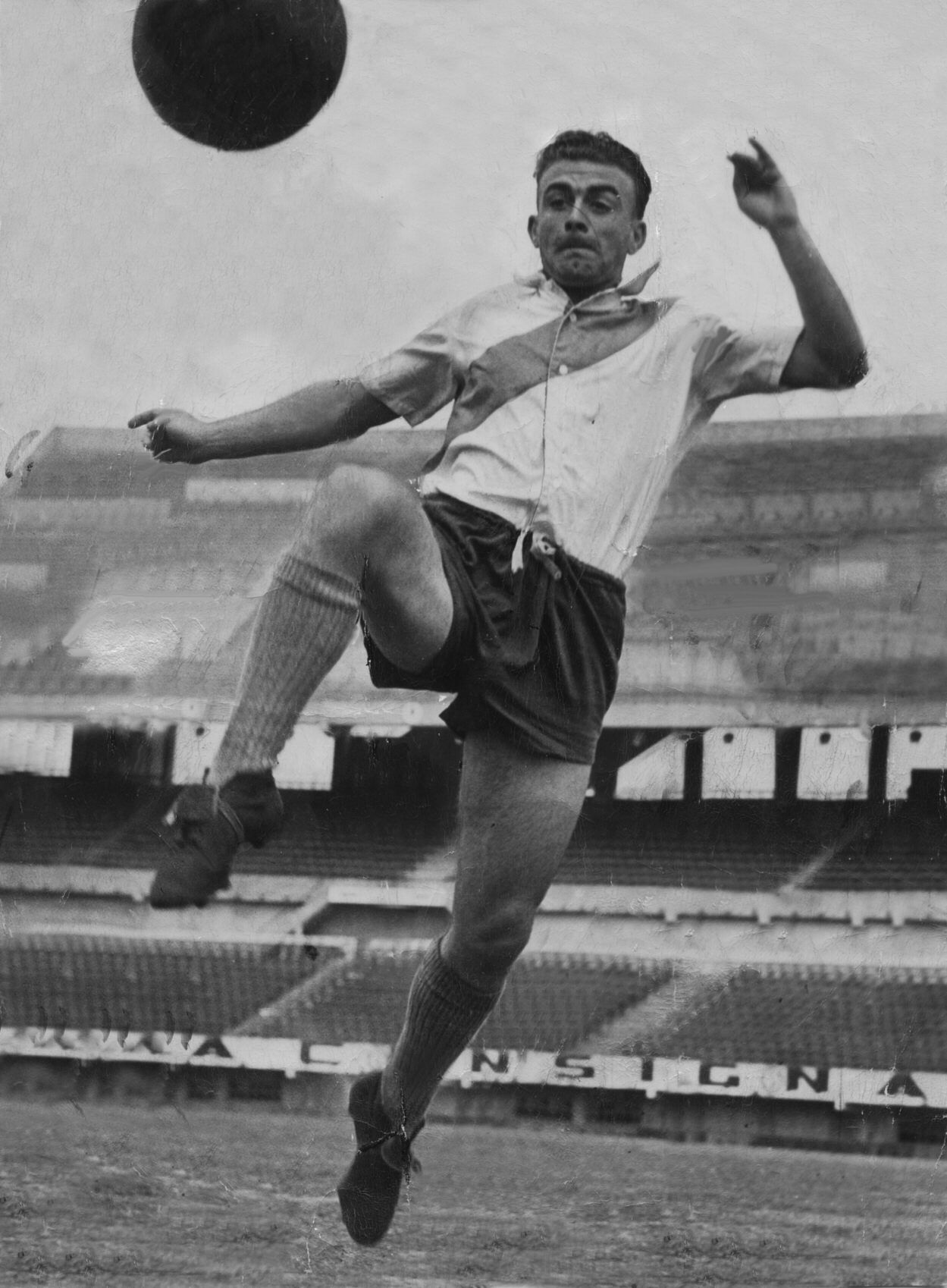
Di Stéfano with River Plate, where he debuted in 1945

In 1944, Di Stéfano's father wrote a letter of recommendation to River Plate, and the club invited Di Stéfano to audition for the youth team. The club was impressed by Di Stéfano, and assigned him to the second team. The following year, at age 19, he played one match for the first team, a 2–1 loss to Huracán in the 1945 Argentine championship on 15 July 1945. Stéfano did not play again that year, but he won his first title as River Plate won the championship.

=== Huracán ===
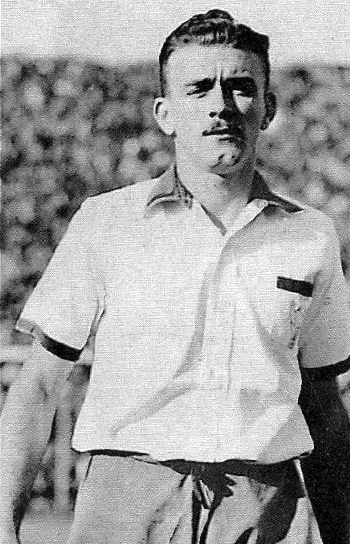
Di Stéfano, pictured in his Huracán kit, played for the club on loan in 1946.

The president of Huracán was impressed by Di Stéfano's talent after witnessing him play his one match the previous season. Realising he had little chance of becoming a permanent member of River Plate first team, Di Stéfano agreed to play for Huracán on loan in 1946. Huracán forward Herminio Masantonio had recently retired, and the club needed a replacement. Di Stéfano scored the first two goals of his career in a 3–1 victory against Estudiantes (LP). In a match against River Plate, he scored the fastest goal in the history of the Argentine championship, after about ten seconds of play. In total, he scored 10 goals in 25 appearances for Huracán; the club tried to sign him permanently at the end of the season, but could not afford the 90,000 pesos River Plate asked for the transfer.

=== Return to River Plate 1947–1949 ===
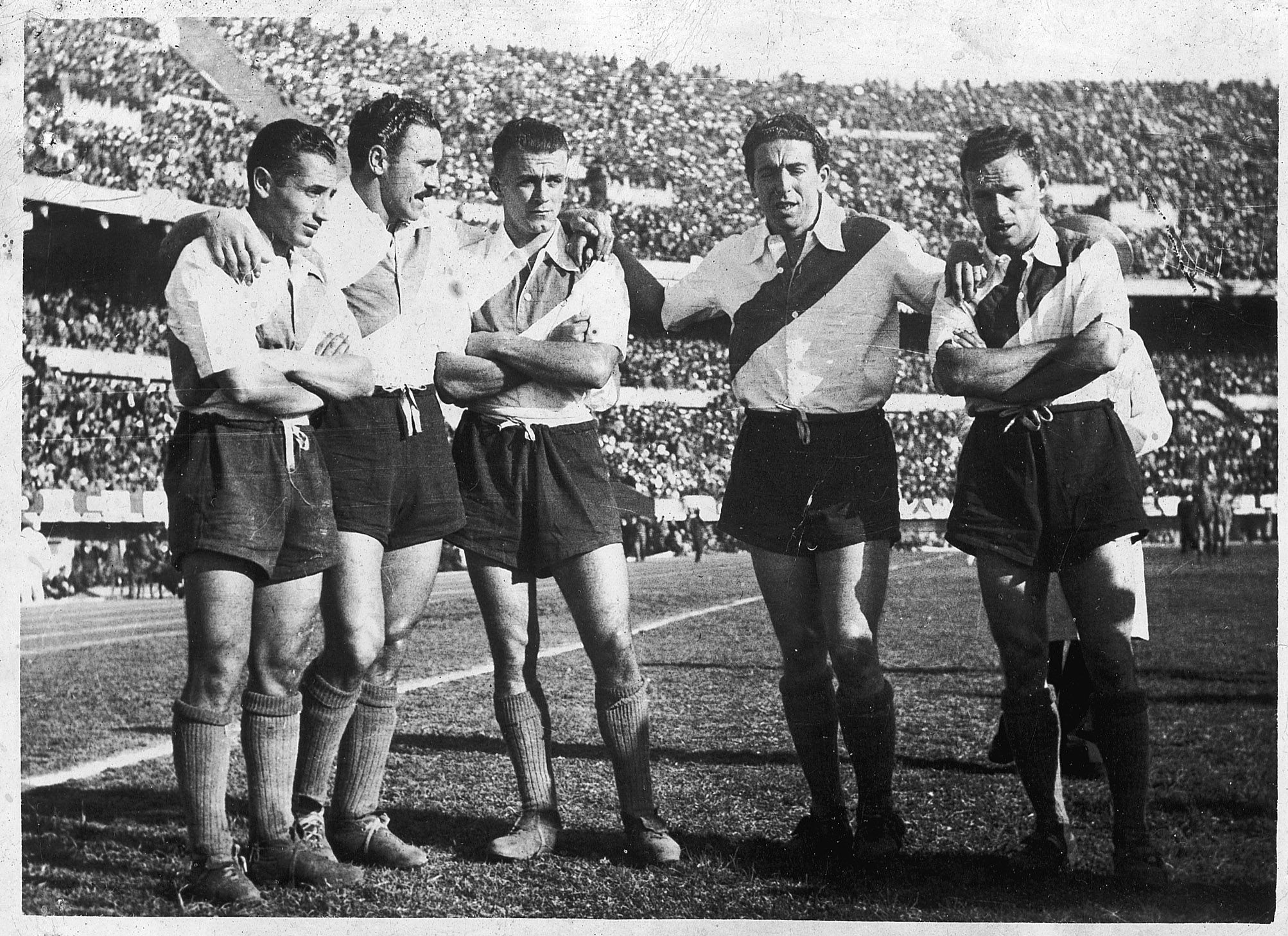
Di Stéfano (third from left) in the La Máquina team of 1947, along with Reyes, Moreno, Labruna, and Loustau

Upon his return to River Plate, Di Stéfano became an integral part of La Máquina, taking on the role of the departing Adolfo Pedernera, who had signed for Atlanta. Carlos Peucelle initially put Di Stéfano on the flank, a position in which Di Stéfano struggled; in a game against Atlanta of Pedernera, Peucelle decided to use him as a center forward and River eventually won 6–1. Soon, Di Stéfano imposed himself as the center forward and his teammates adapted to his game. He received the nickname of Saeta Rubia from journalist Roberto Neuberger. Though he had to leave the team for some time due to compulsory conscription, Di Stéfano contributed significantly to winning the 1947 Argentine Primera División, becoming the top scorer of the league with 27 goals.

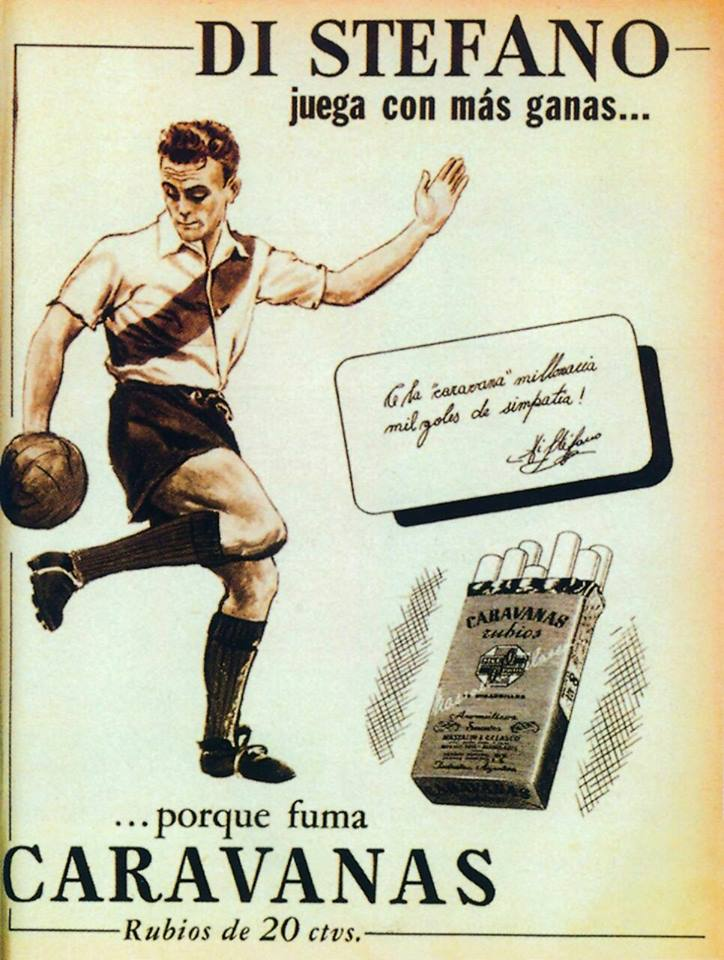
Caravanas cigarettes ad featuring Di Stéfano with River Plate

The league victory gave River Plate the right to represent Argentina in the Copa Aldao against the champions of Uruguay Nacional Montevideo who featured great player like goalkeeper Anibal Paz and Walter Taibo in a two-nation club competition that tracked origins to 1913 and for many it was considered the precursor to the Copa Libertadores. In November 1947, River beat Nacional 4–3 with Di Stéfano scoring one goal in Montevideo, and four days later Di Stéfano celebrated his first international club trophy with a 3–1 victory in Buenos Aires.

In February 1948, champions River Plate participated in the inaugural South American Championship of Champions in Santiago facing the other South American champions, finishing second behind Vasco da Gama with Di Stéfano scoring four goals in six games. During the Argentine championship of 1948, the Football Association suspended the tournament for a short time due to the protests of players led by Adolfo Pedernera and Alfredo Di Stéfano that resulted in a player's strike in a bid to gain professional status and rights. Despite that upheaval Di Stéfano scored 13 goals in 23 games and River Plate finished third. The strike lasted for eight months until 1949 and it eventually meant the departure of the best Argentine footballers to other leagues, in particular Colombia's, which was one of the most lucrative in the world at the time.

In one of his last games in Argentina, on 31 July 1949, Di Stéfano played in the role of goalkeeper, replacing the owner Amadeo Carrizo for a few minutes and keeping the clean sheet in a derby won against Boca Juniors.

=== Millonarios 1949–1953 ===
After the Superga air disaster, in May 1949, a friendly match between River Plate and Grande Torino was played and Di Stéfano was promised to the Granata. However the Argentine forward was soon after contacted by Adolfo Pedernera, who had already agreed to terms with the Colombian Bogota-based club Millonarios on 9 August 1949, after another one of his teammates, Néstor Rossi, signed for the Colombian club without River Plate receiving any compensation for the transfer. Di Stéfano signed with the Colombians. Millonarios, who could not afford to pay the transfer fees anyhow, offered him a salary clearly higher than that at River Plate, and the Argentine forward started a new chapter in his career in Colombia, in period called El Dorado. Many international stars like the Hungarians Béla Sárosi, László Szőke, the Argentines René Pontoni, Héctor Rial, Englishman Charlie Mitten from Manchester United for 5,000 pounds a year, Neil Franklin from Stoke City, French-Hungarian Ferenc Nyers, Italian Luigi Di Franco, the Brazilian Heleno de Freitas and others had joined the league after Pedernera first signed.

The Colombian league had turned professional in 1948, beginning the El Dorado period on 25 April 1949. Di Stéfano, Perdenera, and Nestor Rossi who joined Millonarios in the summer, formed part of the famous team called the Ballet Azul that won their first title ever beating Deportivo Cali in the 1949 final, with Di Stéfano scoring 16 goals in 14 games. Di Stéfano scored 23 goals in 29 games the following 1950 season, but Millonarios finished two points behind eventual champions Deportes Caldas. Di Stéfano, who kept himself in excellent condition, excelled during his games and led Millonarios to a second title in 1951, leaving runners-up Boca Juniors de Cali 11 points behind at the final table. Di Stéfano scored 32 goals in 34 games, more than any other player in the league. Millonarios would go on to lose the 1951 Copa Colombia (played in 1952) to Boca Juniors de Cali.

The 1952 league had the same outcome: Milionarios overtook Boca Juniors de Cali, won their third title, and Di Stéfano was once again top scorer with 19 goals. In October 1952, Di Stéfano also led Millonarios to the Copa Colombia final after beating Cúcuta Deportivo by 2–1. The final would be played in May 1953, after Di Stéfano had already gone to Argentina.

In October 1951, the División Mayor del Fútbol Profesional Colombiano agreed to the Pacto de Lima with FIFA, with the requirement that foreign players would return to their countries after October 1954. Di Stéfano scored a total of 267 goals in 292 games for Milionarios, and is considered one of the best footballers in the history of the Colombian League.

=== The disputed transfer to Spain ===
In March 1952, Real Madrid organized a friendly tournament in the Spanish capital at its newly constructed home ground; River Plate was invited to participate in Real Madrid's 50th-anniversary tournament. The tournament was called Bodas de Oro, but once Real Madrid's Santiago Bernabeu heard about the new powerhouse in South America, Real Madrid cancelled the invitation to River Plate and invited the Colombians as the South American representative. The Colombians participated in the tournament and won it, after drawing 2–2 with Swedish champions Norrköping and overcoming Los Blancos, who were managed by Uruguayan legend Hector Scarone, by a 4–2 margin with a brace from Saeta Rubia in the presence of President Santiago Bernabéu, who arrived to the stadium to observe Adolfo Pedernera. Millonarios would start a global tour and, spearheaded by Di Stéfano, they would beat Hungary and world champions Uruguay.

Soon after Millonarios' return to Colombia, the Barcelona directors visited Buenos Aires and agreed with River Plate, the last FIFA-affiliated team to have held Di Stéfano's rights, for his transfer in 1954 for the equivalent of 150 million Italian lira (according to other sources 200,000 dollars). This started a battle between the two Spanish rivals for his rights. In Christmas 1952, Di Stéfano, still contracted with Millonarios, returned briefly to Buenos Aires, where he was even making plans to abandon football and start a business, as the Argentine league was still not professional.

FIFA appointed Armando Muñoz Calero, former president of the Spanish Football Federation as mediator. Calero decided to let Di Stéfano play the 1953–54 and 1955–56 seasons in Madrid, and the 1954–55 and 1956–57 seasons in Barcelona. The agreement was approved by the Football Association and their respective clubs. Although the Catalans agreed, the decision created various discontent among the Blaugrana members, and the president was forced to resign in September 1953.

Barcelona sold Madrid their half-share, and Di Stéfano moved to the Blancos, signing a four-year contract. Real paid 5.5 million Spanish pesetas for the transfer, plus a 1.3 million bonus for the purchase, an annual fee to be paid to the Millonarios, and a 16,000 salary for Di Stéfano with a bonus double that of his teammates, for a total of 40% of the annual revenue of the Madrid club. This fact contributed greatly to intensifying the rivalry with Barcelona.

=== Real Madrid: The first European triumph ===
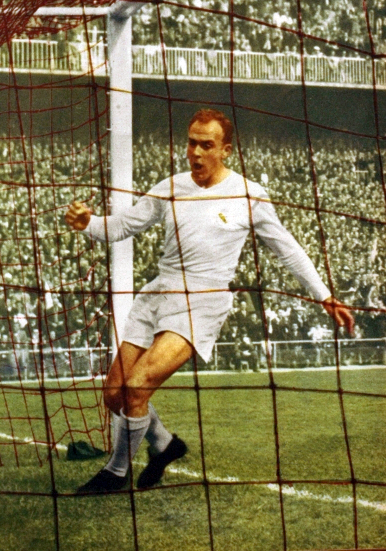
Di Stéfano scoring a goal for Real Madrid where he won 17 official titles

A 27-year-old Di Stéfano arrived at Real Madrid on 22 September 1953, after seven months of inactivity, and made his debut with the white jersey five days later, scoring his first goal for Real Madrid in a 4–2 home win against Racing Santander. On 25 October 1953, Di Stéfano played in his first Clásico against champions Barcelona, just a few hours after the Catalonian team had sold his share on the Argentinian, and Di Stéfano contributed two goals in a 5–0 win. In his first several months in Madrid, the Argentine champion did not adapt to European football, but imposed his own style, playing all around the field with speed and keeping the ball low on the ground. Highlights of his first season included two match-winning performances against city rivals Atlético Madrid, with a hat-trick in a 5–0 away win in November 1953, and scoring the two goals in a 5–0 home comeback in February 1954. The Blancos managed to win the Spanish championship after two decades, with Di Stéfano contributing two hat-tricks in the last two home games of the season, including the decisive 4–0 win against Valencia that secured the title victory. His late goalscoring run made Di Stéfano the top scorer of 1953–54 La Liga with 27 goals in 28 appearances, beating Barcelona's László Kubala by three goals.

The following year, Real Madrid acquired Argentine Héctor Rial from the Nacional Montevideo, a signing recommended by Di Stéfano, for the attack of the Merengues. Despite the surprise sacking of manager Enrique Fernández halfway through the season, the club won another league title in 1955 with José Villalonga, leaving Barcelona again in second place in the table. Di Stéfano scored 25 goals, finishing behind only Juan Arza (28) among the scorers of the Spanish league. On 26 June 1955, Los Blancos won their first ever Latin Cup, beating Raymond Kopa's Reims in the Paris final 2–0.

The second consecutive Spanish title allowed Real Madrid to be the first Spanish representative in the inaugural European Cup in the 1955–56 season. Di Stéfano made his European Cup debut against Servette in a 2–0 away win. In the league, he was again the top scorer with 24 goals, but despite that, Athletic Bilbao won the tournament ahead of Barça and Real. In the European Cup, the team had their way eliminating the Swiss and later Partizan Belgrade, after a suffering a 3–0 defeat in Yugoslavia. With the guidance of Di Stéfano they had an easy 4–0 victory in Madrid in the first leg, in December 1956. Real Madrid flew to Belgrade and despite the snowstorm that had hit the city in the previous days, the president Bernabéu agreed for the match not to be postponed. Unlike the Spaniards, the Partizan players did not suffer on the terrain, taking the lead and dominating the game. A penalty was awarded to Real Madrid, but Héctor Rial slipped when kicking and missed it. In the final minutes with the Serbians up by 3–0, Di Stéfano helped in defending and Real qualified despite a clear defeat. The Blancos eliminated Milan in the semi-finals 6–4 on aggregate and entered the final in Paris against Raymond Kopa's Reims. Real Madrid suffered in the first half, but Di Stéfano carried his teammates in a comeback to win the trophy 4–3. At the end of the year, on 18 December 1956, the first Ballon d'Or was awarded, and Di Stéfano missed on winning it by just three votes to Stanley Matthews of English club Blackpool.

=== Naturalization and the building of an empire ===
During the summer of 1956, Real Madrid signed Raymond Kopa from the Stade de Reims. The French forward could not feature in the games due to the limit of foreigners in La Liga and had to wait for the Spanish naturalization of Di Stèfano, who became a Spanish citizen in October 1956.

The season started early with the participation of Real Madrid in the Small World Cup in Caracas, Venezuela as European champions. The Spaniards faced Vasco da Gama, Roma and Porto playing against players like World Cup winner Alcides Ghiggia and Vavá. Real won the trophy with three wins, and Di Stéfano finished as top scorer of the tournament with four goals (same as Vavá).

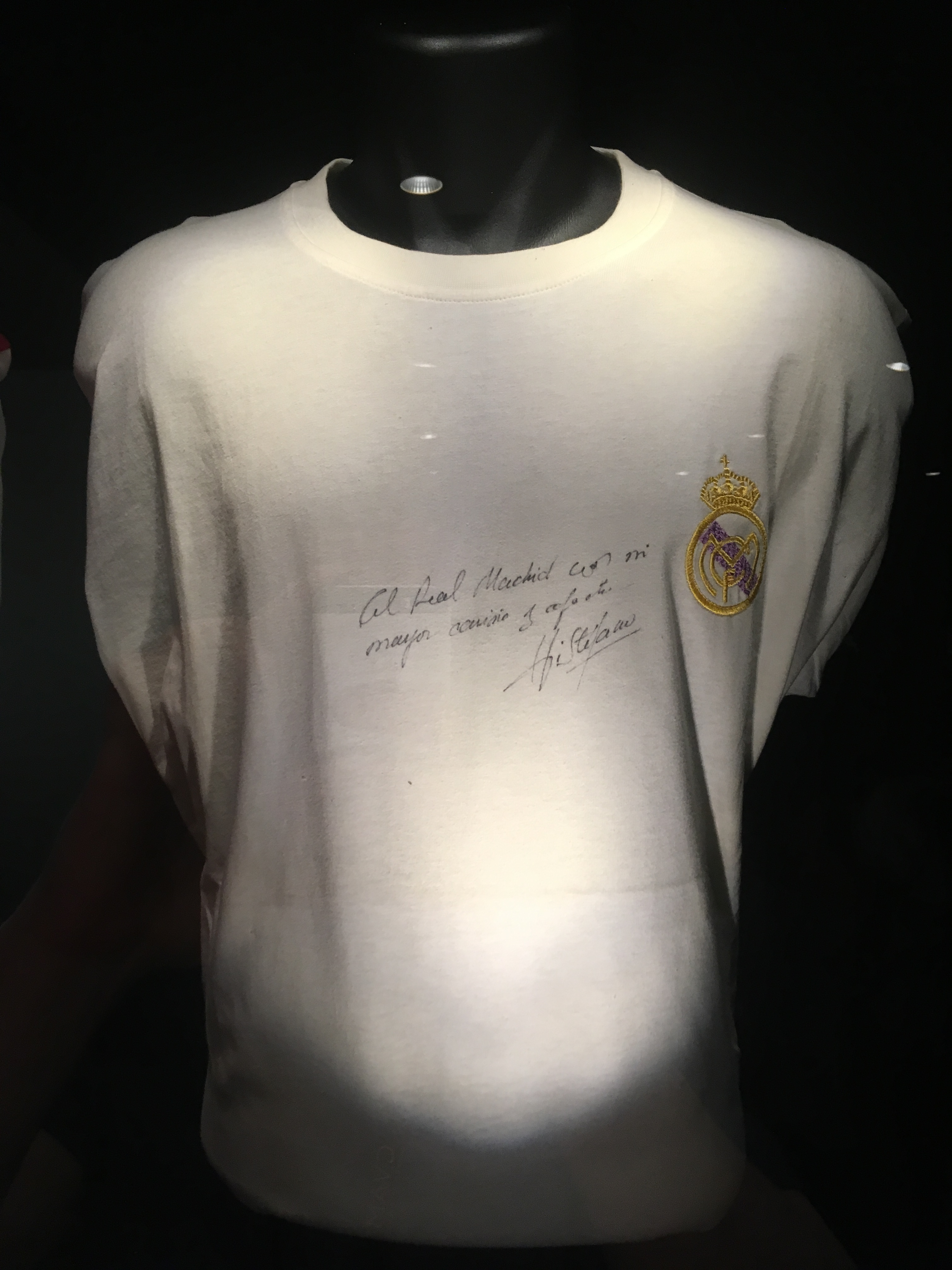
Signed Real Madrid jersey worn by Alfredo Di Stéfano in the 1956 European Cup Final against Reims

As Real Madrid did not win the title in the previous season, president Santiago Bernabéu, who also served as the vice-president of the competition, came up with the idea that the European Cup winner had the right to register for the next edition to defend the title even if they had failed to win the domestic league. Consequently, Real participated in the 1956–57 season, eliminating Rapid Vienna, Nice, and Manchester United in the semi-finals before beating Fiorentina 2–0 in the final, in Madrid. During the season, Real also asserted itself in the last edition of the Latin Cup, overcoming Benfica 1–0 in the final with a decisive goal by Di Stéfano. At the end of the year, he won the 1957 Ballon d'Or. From the twenty-third day of the 1956–57 La Liga, Real Madrid started a series of consecutive victorious home results that ended only in 1966, at the twenty-fifth round of the Liga, after 121 matches. The Blancos attack was one of the best in history and boasted Di Stéfano, Héctor Rial, Francisco Gento and Kopa. Real won the league title in 1957 and Di Stéfano was again the top scorer with 31 goals.

In the following season, Real Madrid was further strengthened with the arrival of Uruguayan José Santamaría in defense. Di Stéfano scored 19 goals and won the top scorer award, obtaining the 1957–58 league title at the expense of Atlético Madrid. In the quarter-finals of the European Cup, Real Madrid faced Sevilla, humiliating their opponents in the first leg in Madrid with an 8–0 victory, where Di Stéfano scored four goals. In the return leg in Seville, Di Stéfano was greeted by the insulting choruses of opposing fans and Real were held to a 2–2 draw. In the semi-finals, Di Stèfano contributed to the success against the Hungarian Vasas and the team reached the final against Juan Alberto Schiaffino's Milan. Real Madrid won the final with a 3–2 comeback victory, and the Argentine finished the tournament as the top scorer with 10 goals.

The season finished with the loss of the 1958 Generalísimo Cup in the final to Athletic Bilbao, 0–2. As a result, Ferenc Puskás signed with Real Madrid in the summer of 1958 to strengthen the squad and Real Madrid would be blessed with one of the most lethal attacking pairs in the history of football. Nevertheless, Real ended up second in the 1958–59 season behind Barça, with Di Stéfano finishing as the best scorer in the league for the fifth and last time, and the fourth in a row, with 23 goals.

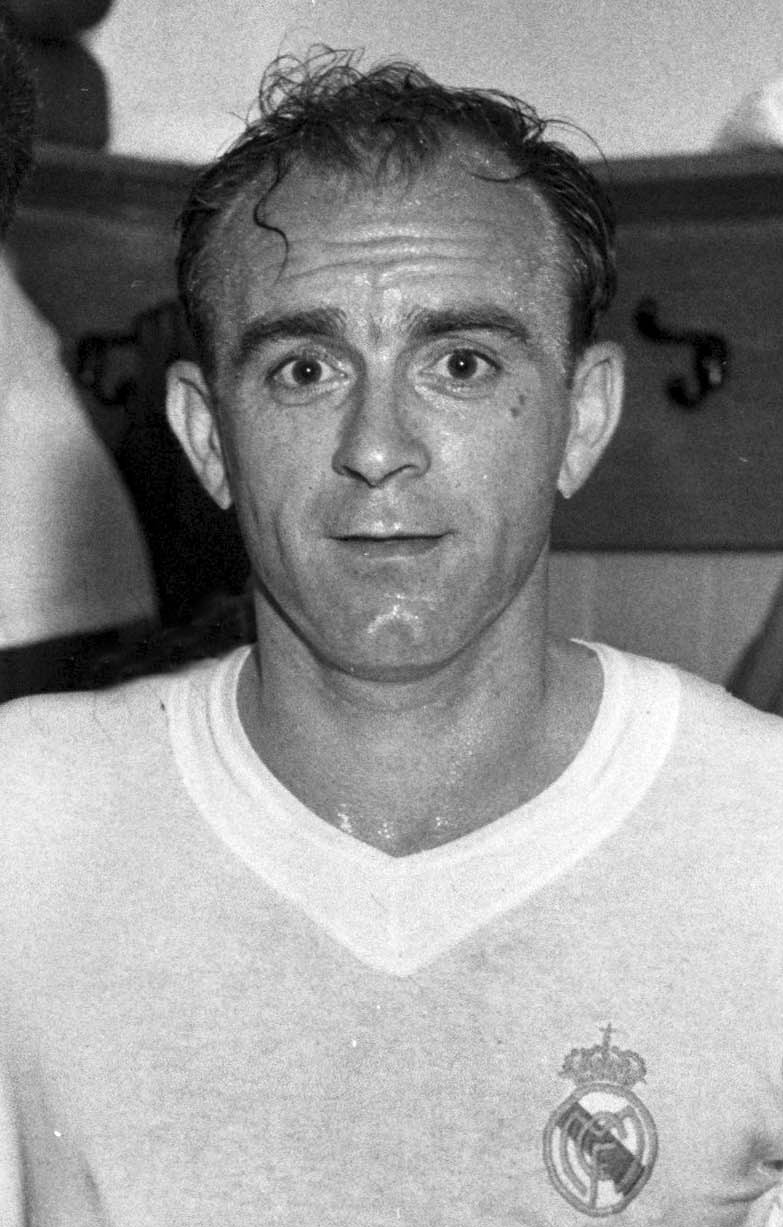
Di Stefano with Real Madrid in 1959

After overcoming rivals Atlético Madrid in three games in the semi-finals, Real Madrid won its fourth consecutive European Cup by defeating Reims (as three years ago), that now included the 1958 FIFA World Cup top-scorer Just Fontaine, by a score of 2–0. During the final, Enrique Mateos, substituting for Puskás (the Hungarian feared retaliation and decided not to depart with the team for the final in Stuttgart), took a penalty instead of Di Stéfano and missed it. At the beginning of the second half, Di Stéfano scored the second goal to seal the victory.

On 16 July 1959, Real Madrid hosted a match against Pelé and his Brazilian club, Santos, during their European tour. It was one of the most anticipated games of the tour, given the reputation that Pelé had started building. Di Stéfano's team would beat the Brazilians 5–3. In December, France Football awarded Di Stéfano the 1959 Ballon d'Or, which he won ahead of teammate Raymond Kopa (who had already returned to Reims in the summer of 1959) and Juventus's Welsh star John Charles. Puskás and Gento both finished in the top ten.

During the 1959–60 season, the Madrilenos signed the Brazilian midfielder Didi who was a 1958 World Cup winner, the tournament best player and former teammate of Garrincha and Pelé. Given that the Brazilian's style of play was similar to Di Stéfano's, Didi often clashed with the Argentine and there were rumours that he asked for his release from the club's management in the summer of 1960. But with Didi in the squad, the Blancos won their fifth consecutive European Cup. After eliminating Barcelona in the semi-finals, Real Madrid played in the final at the Hampden Park in Glasgow in front of 135,000 spectators against Eintracht Frankfurt. Di Stéfano and Puskás scored three and four goals, respectively, in a game considered to be among the finest in the history of football. Di Stéfano scored eight goals in the tournament, finishing second in the scorers' chart behind Puskás. In the 1959–60 league season, Madrid finished equal with Barcelona on points, but Barcelona won the title on a goal average tie-breaker. Real Madrid lost the Generalísimo Cup final to Atlético Madrid 3–1 at home on 26 June 1960.

=== European decline and the first domestic double ===
The new season started with the inaugural Intercontinental Cup and the 0–0 draw in the first leg of the final against Peñarol in Montevideo on 4 July. In the return leg, however, Real beat the Uruguayans 5–1 with Di Stéfano scoring one goal on 4 September 1960. On 13 December 1960, Di Stéfano came fourth in the Ballon d'Or voting, and for the first time in history, Real Madrid were knocked out of the European Cup, losing 3–4 on aggregate against Barcelona after a controversial second leg. Madrid, however, regrouped and easily won La Liga by a great margin over runners-up Atlético Madrid, but lost the final of the Generalísimo Cup again to the Rojiblancos, 2–3. Di Stéfano finished the season with 21 goals, being the second-highest scorer in the league behind Puskás who netted 28 goals.

In the 1961–62 season, Di Stéfano won the domestic double for the first time, clinching the Generalísimo Cup 15 years since the last time Real Madrid had won the trophy, after beating Sevilla 2–1 in the final with two goals from Puskás to overturn the initial red and white advantage. Di Stéfano finished 6th in the Ballon d'Or voting in December. In the 1961–62 European Cup, Real reached the final for the sixth time in seven seasons, after eliminating Juventus and Standard Liège. In the showpiece, Madrid played against defending champions Benfica and though the Spaniards took the lead twice, in the second half of the game the Lusitanians cruised to successfully retaining their title with a thrilling 5–3 victory, courtesy of Eusébio. Real Madrid lost its first European Cup final, and for the first time Di Stéfano failed to score (the three goals were scored by Puskás). Nevertheless, Di Stéfano was among the best scorers of the competition for the second time in his career, with seven goals.

In the autumn of 1962, the Blancos were eliminated in the 1962–63 European Cup preliminary round by Anderlecht. However, with Di Stéfano at the age of 37, Real won the 1962–63 league title over Atlético Madrid, with Puskás finishing as the top scorer once again.

The 1963–64 season was the last for Di Stéfano at Real Madrid. At the beginning of the season, the team had an exhibition tour in Venezuela as they participated in the Small Club World Cup against São Paulo and Porto. Di Stéfano played on the first match on 20 August, but on 24 August the Argentine champion was kidnapped by the National Liberation Armed Forces of Venezuela in the Potomac hotel in Caracas, and was released by them three days later, unharmed. The incident cost the Los Blancos the trophy as without Di Stéfano they could not overcome São Paulo in the final game. The season, however, went on to be quite successful, with the Blancos clinching their fourth consecutive league title and returning to the European Cup final, having defeated AC Milan in the quarter-finals 4–3 on aggregate along the way. In the final, Madrid faced Helenio Herrera's Inter Milan. Hours before the final, Di Stéfano explicitly criticized the tactics designed by Real Madrid head coach Miguel Muñoz against Italian defender Giacinto Facchetti. The relationship between Di Stéfano and Muñoz, who had the support of President Bernabéu, had been problematic for over a year and reached its climax in the final, which Inter won 3–1, a match in which both came to accuse each other of the defeat. The final on 27 May 1964 was his last match with Madrid, and in doing so at the age of 37 years, 10 months and 23 days, he became the oldest outfield player in the club's history, until that record was surpassed in the following year by Puskás and then by Luka Modrić in 2023; currently the fifth oldest overall, also behind goalkeepers Francisco Buyo and Jerzy Dudek.

=== Real Madrid career in numbers ===
Di Stéfano played for Real Madrid for eleven years, winning eight Spanish championships, one Spanish Cup, two Latin Cups, five consecutive Champions Cups (scoring in all the finals he won), one Intercontinental Cup, several individual titles, including league top scorer five times. He scored 418 goals in 510 games, of which 308 goals in 396 official matches (49 goals in 59 matches in the Champions Cup), becoming the best scorer in the history of the club, until that record was surpassed several decades later first by Raúl and then by Cristiano Ronaldo (the current record goalscorer) and Karim Benzema. Di Stéfano also scored a then-record 22 La Liga hat-tricks, the last of which came against Real Murcia on 15 March 1964, becoming, at the age of 37 years and 255 days, the oldest player to achieve that feat not only in La Liga, but in Europe's top five leagues, a record that he held for 45 years until it was broken by Joaquín in 2019.

=== Espanyol ===
After the Champions Cup final loss in 1964 against Inter Milan, president Santiago Bernabéu offered Di Stéfano a place on the Real Madrid coaching staff instead of renewing the player's contract. Di Stéfano refused Bernabéu's proposal and left the club instead. The news about his freedom spread much ink in the local and national press as several clubs came knocking on his door, such as Espanyol, Betis, Celtic and AC Milan. In late July, Di Stéfano even went to Milan accompanied by Luis Carniglia to meet the club's leaders and issue a counteroffer to Espanyol's proposal, but the Italians were not willing to undertake his signing at any price and they already had the three foreign players allowed per squad. In early August, Celtic made a £20,000 ($56,000) offer at the last minute, but Di Stéfano sent a telegram to the Scots declining the proposal.

The Argentine veteran scored nine goals in all competitions in his first season with Espanyol, putting an end to a streak of 15 consecutive seasons in which he scored in double figures (18 total). In his final season with Espanyol, he scored five goals in all competitions, including a goal against his former club Barcelona on 12 February 1966, and then, eight days later, his last-ever La Liga goal, an equalizer against Mallorca to seal a 1–1 draw, which proved to be crucial in Espanyol's survival as they finished just one point ahead of Mallorca, who was relegated. In doing so at the age of 39 years and 226 days, he became the second oldest scorer in the competition's history, only behind César Rodríguez in 1960 (39 years and 274 days). He played his last league match against Atlético Madrid on 3 April, at the age of 39 years and 270 days, currently the seventh oldest player to play in La Liga.

Di Stéfano scored his last career goal on 23 April, a 79th-minute winner against Real Betis in the first leg of the 1965–66 Copa del Rey round of 16, but Espanyol then lost the second leg on 30 April by 0–4 in what was his last game as a professional. After 14 goals in 60 matches with Espanyol, he retired as a player in 1966, just a few months shy of his 40th birthday, helping his team avoid relegation in both seasons. Despite what was previously stated, Bernabéu decided to honour Di Stéfano for his services by giving him a farewell match at the Bernabéu on 7 June 1967 against Celtic, who won 0–1 with a goal from Bobby Lennox. In the 13th minute, Di Stéfano took off the captain's armband and gave it to Ramón Grosso, a player who inherited his number in the team, amidst the applause of the entire stadium; afterwards, he received the Gold Medal of the Royal Order of Sports Merit, the highest distinction for sport in Spain.

== International career ==
Di Stéfano played with three different national teams during his career, scoring six goals in six appearances for Argentina, and 23 in 31 appearances for Spain. However, he never played in the World Cup. Di Stéfano also played four times for Colombia, during the Dimayor period of Colombian football. The team at the time was not recognised by FIFA as the league had broken transfer rules in signing players while still under contract.

=== Argentina ===
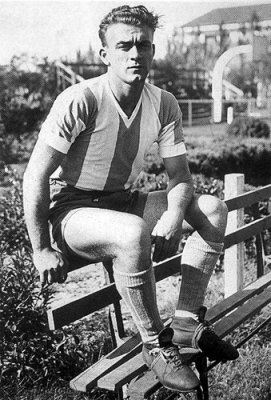
Di Stéfano won the South American Championship with Argentina in 1947.

Di Stéfano made his international debut on 4 December 1947, in a match against Bolivia at the Estadio George Capwell in Ecuador, during the 1947 South American Championship. He scored his first international goal in that same match, helping Argentina to a 7–0 win. Di Stéfano scored five more goals during the championship – including his first hat-trick against Colombia – as Argentina successfully defended the title they had won the previous year on home soil.

Di Stéfano's six games during that tournament would prove to be his only appearances for Argentina. Player strikes, and a dispute with the Brazilian Football Confederation, forced Argentina to withdraw from qualifying for the 1950 FIFA World Cup in Brazil, as well as the 1949 and 1953 South American Championships. By the time qualifying began for the 1954 FIFA World Cup, FIFA had banned Di Stéfano from making any further appearances for Argentina, on account of his appearances for the Colombia XI two years earlier – though Argentina once again pulled out of qualifying.

=== Colombia (not-FIFA sanctioned) ===
In 1949, the Argentinian league went on strike, and Di Stéfano moved to Millonarios in Colombia. At that time, the División Mayor del Fútbol Profesional Colombiano league had split from the Colombian Football Federation in the period that was known as El Dorado, resulting in an international ban for the clubs and players alike. Ignoring the edict, the breakaway league organised a series of friendly matches were organised as a combined XI of the Colombian league. Di Stéfano made four appearances for the Colombian XI team in non-FIFA sanctioned internationals in 1951.

=== Spain ===
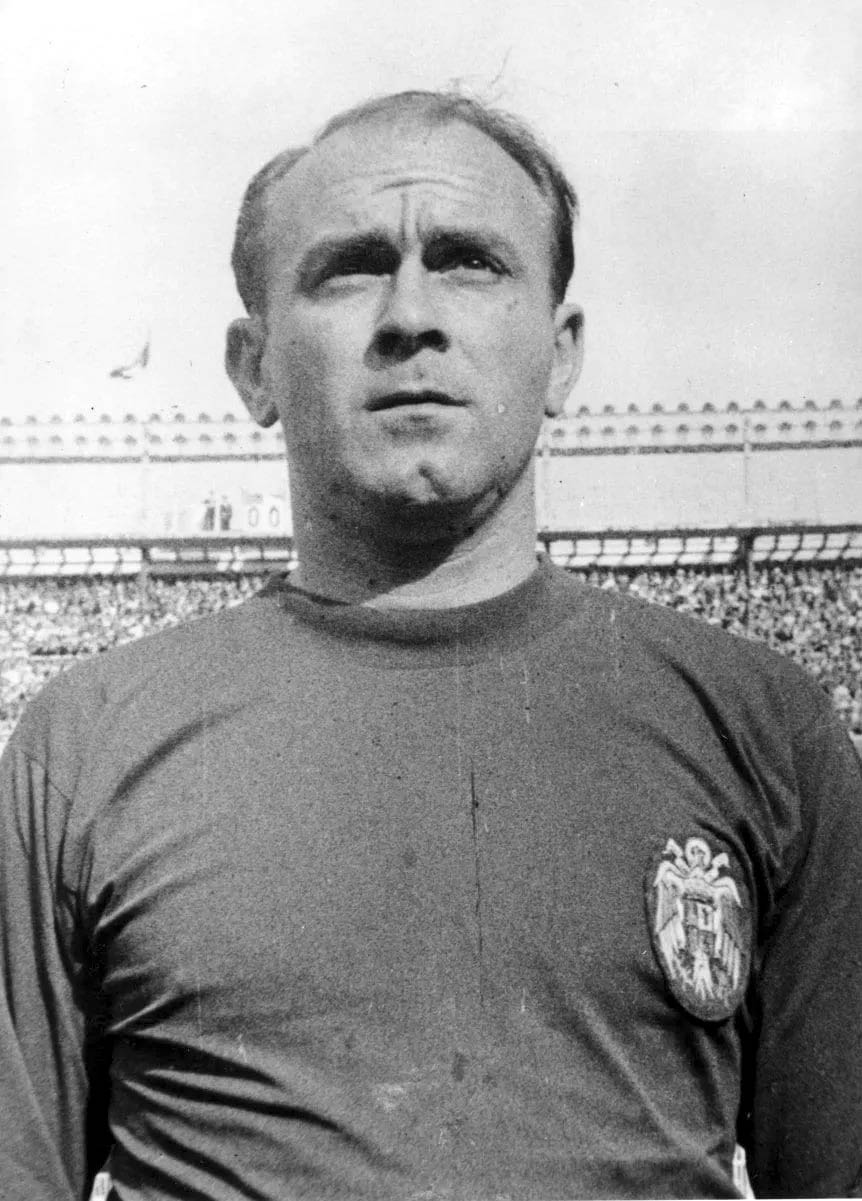
Di Stéfano with the Spain national team in 1962

Banned from playing for Argentina, Di Stéfano switched allegiances to Spain around 1954. FIFA initially refused to sanction this, but after Di Stéfano acquired Spanish citizenship in 1956, and amid pressure from the Spanish FA, the decision was eventually reversed. Di Stéfano consequently made his debut for Spain on 30 January 1957 in a friendly against the Netherlands in Madrid, scoring a hat-trick in a 5–1 win to become one of a number of players born outside Spain to have appeared for their national team.

The Spanish team, with a forward line also boasting Barcelona and Real Madrid stars Laszlo Kubala, Luis Suárez and Francisco Gento, were favourites to qualify for the 1958 FIFA World Cup in Sweden, having been drawn into a qualification group with Scotland and minnows Switzerland. However, Spain began their campaign with a 2–2 draw against the Swiss and then lost to Scotland at Hampden Park 4–2. Spain won both of the reverse fixtures 4–1, but the damage had already been done: Scotland beat Switzerland in their final match and qualified at Spain's expense. Di Stéfano, who had played in all four games and scored two goals, missed out yet again.

In 1961, at the age of 35, Di Stéfano finally qualified for a World Cup, helping Spain qualify for the 1962 edition in Chile. A muscular injury just before the competition prevented him from playing in the finals, but Di Stéfano travelled with the squad anyway, picking the number 6 jersey as his preferred number 9 was taken by Gento. Spain boasted the likes of José Santamaría and Ferenc Puskás – both also naturalised citizens, and who had, coincidentally, represented their respective home countries in the 1954 tournament – but with Di Stéfano sidelined, they failed to make it out of the group stage, losing to Didi's Brazil in their final game and finishing at the bottom of their group. Di Stéfano retired from international football after the tournament.

== Managerial career ==
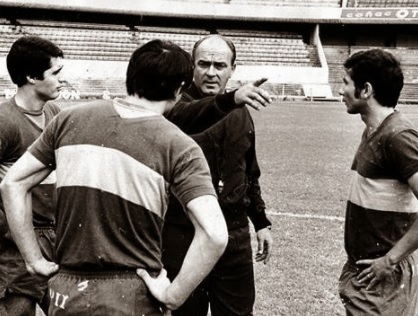
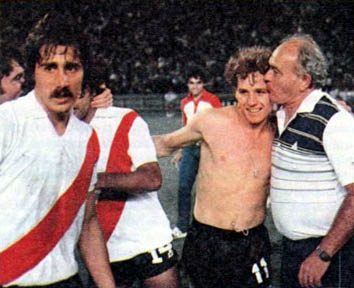
Two moments of Di Stéfano as manager of Boca Juniors and River Plate in 1969 and 1981 respectively; (left): giving a speech to players; (right): congratulating his players in a Torneo de Verano match

After retirement, Di Stéfano moved into coaching. He guided Argentine club Boca Juniors to win two titles, the 1969 Nacional when the team won the Nacional championship. and the 1969 Copa Argentina.

After his successful run in Argentina, in Di Stéfano returned to Spain for the 1970-71 season winning La Liga and the European Cup Winners' Cup with Valencia. He also managed Sporting in the 1974–75 season.

In 1981, Di Stéfano was hired as coach of River Plate, the club where he had debuted as player. With Mario Kempes as the star player of the team, Di Stéfano led River Plate to win the 1981 Nacional championship.

Di Stéfano was also coach of Real Madrid between 1982 and 1984. In the 1982–83 season, they finished second in La Liga and were defeated in the finals of the 1982 Supercopa de España, Copa de la Liga, and Copa del Rey. Madrid also reached the European Cup Winners' Cup final that season, but were also beaten by Aberdeen, managed by Alex Ferguson. The team also finished second in the La Liga of next season again. He also returned to Valencia in 1986 to guide them back to La Liga by winning the Segunda Division after their relegation the season prior before his arrival.

== After retirement ==
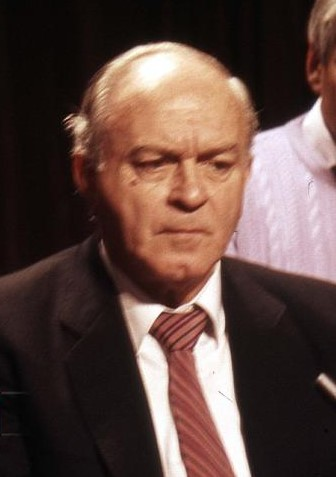
Di Stéfano in 1988

Di Stéfano lived in Spain until his death in 2014. On 5 November 2000, he was named Honorary President of Real Madrid. On 24 December 2005, the 79-year-old Di Stéfano suffered a heart attack in Hospital General Universitario Gregorio Marañón near Santiago Bernabéu Stadium in Madrid

On 9 May 2006, the Alfredo Di Stéfano Stadium was inaugurated at the City of Real Madrid, where Real Madrid usually train. Its inaugural match was a friendly between Real Madrid and Reims, a rematch of the European Cup final won by Real Madrid in 1956. Real Madrid won 6–1 with goals from Sergio Ramos, Antonio Cassano (2), Roberto Soldado (2) and José Manuel Jurado.

== Personal life ==
Di Stéfano married Sara Freites in 1950, and they had six children. Freites died in 2005. In 2013, Di Stéfano's children won custody of him and his assets in order to prevent him from marrying Gina González, his secretary who was 50 years younger than him. In 1965, Di Stéfano was made the godfather of Quique Sánchez Flores, the son of Di Stéfano's Real Madrid teammate Isidro Sánchez.

== Death and legacy ==
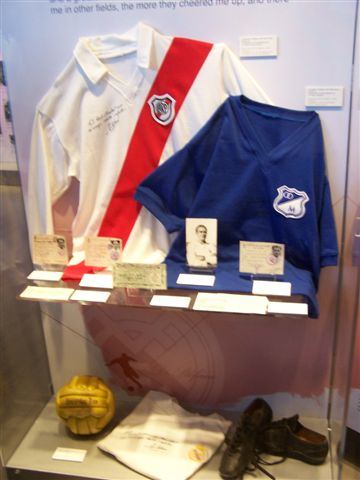
Di Stéfano's memorabilia at the Real Madrid museum

Following a heart attack on 5 July 2014, Di Stéfano was moved into intensive care at the Gregorio Marañón hospital in Madrid, where he died on 7 July at the age of 88. The following day, his casket, draped with a Real Madrid banner, was placed on public display at the Santiago Bernabéu Stadium. Real Madrid president Florentino Pérez and team captain Iker Casillas were among those in attendance. Following his death, Di Stéfano was honoured with tributes from football personalities including Alex Ferguson, Pelé, Cristiano Ronaldo, Diego Maradona and Bobby Charlton.

During the 2014 FIFA World Cup semi-final between Argentina and the Netherlands on 9 July, Di Stéfano was honoured with one minute of silence, with the Argentine team wearing black ribbons as a mark of respect. River Plate and Millonarios organized a friendly match in homage of Di Stéfano, held on 16 July at Millonarios' Estadio El Campín. In September 2017, a street near Real Madrid's training complex was named after Di Stéfano to mark the 64th anniversary of his debut.

In its obituary for Di Stéfano in 2014, The New York Times described him as an "agile, tireless and versatile" player who personified total football. According to The Guardian, Di Stéfano was regarded by many former players and managers as the best all-around player in history. He was noted for his ability to play any position, his awareness on the pitch, his accurate passing, and stamina.

== Career statistics ==
=== Club ===
Appearances and goals by club, season and competition
Club	Season	League			Cup		Continental		Total	
Club	Season	Division	Apps	Goals	Apps	Goals	Apps	Goals	Apps	Goals
River Plate	1945	Argentine Primera División	1	0	0	0	0	0	1	0
Huracán (loan)	1946	Argentine Primera División	25	10	2	0	0	0	27	10
River Plate	1947	Argentine Primera División	30	27	0	0	2	1	32	28
River Plate	1948	Argentine Primera División	23	13	1	1	6	4	30	18
River Plate	1949	Argentine Primera División	12	9	0	0	0	0	12	9
River Plate	Total		66	49	1	1	8	5	75	55
Millonarios	1949	Campeonato Profesional	15	15	0	0	0	0	14	14
Millonarios	1950	Campeonato Profesional	29	23	2	1	0	0	31	24
Millonarios	1951	Campeonato Profesional	34	31	0	0	0	0	34	31
Millonarios	1952	Campeonato Profesional	24	19	8	5	0	0	32	24
Millonarios	Total		102	88	10	6	0	0	111	93
Real Madrid	1953–54	La Liga	28	27	0	0	0	0	28	27
Real Madrid	1954–55	La Liga	30	25	0	0	2	0	32	25
Real Madrid	1955–56	La Liga	30	24	0	0	7	5	37	29
Real Madrid	1956–57	La Liga	30	31	3	3	10	9	43	43
Real Madrid	1957–58	La Liga	30	19	7	7	7	10	44	36
Real Madrid	1958–59	La Liga	28	23	8	5	7	6	43	34
Real Madrid	1959–60	La Liga	23	12	5	3	6	8	34	23
Real Madrid	1960–61	La Liga	23	21	9	8	4	1	36	30
Real Madrid	1961–62	La Liga	23	11	8	4	10	7	41	22
Real Madrid	1962–63	La Liga	13	12	9	9	2	1	24	22
Real Madrid	1963–64	La Liga	24	11	1	1	9	5	34	17
Real Madrid	Total		282	216	50	40	64	52	396	308
Espanyol	1964–65	La Liga	24	7	3	2	0	0	27	9
Espanyol	1965–66	La Liga	23	4	4	1	6	0	33	5
Espanyol	Total		47	11	7	3	6	0	60	14
Career total			521	373	70	50	78	57	669	480

=== International ===
Appearances and goals by national team and year
National team	Year	Apps	Goals
Argentina	1947	6	6
Argentina	Total	6	6
Spain	1957	7	7
Spain	1958	4	1
Spain	1959	5	6
Spain	1960	8	6
Spain	1961	7	3
Spain	Total	31	23
Career total		37	29

== Honours ==
=== Player ===
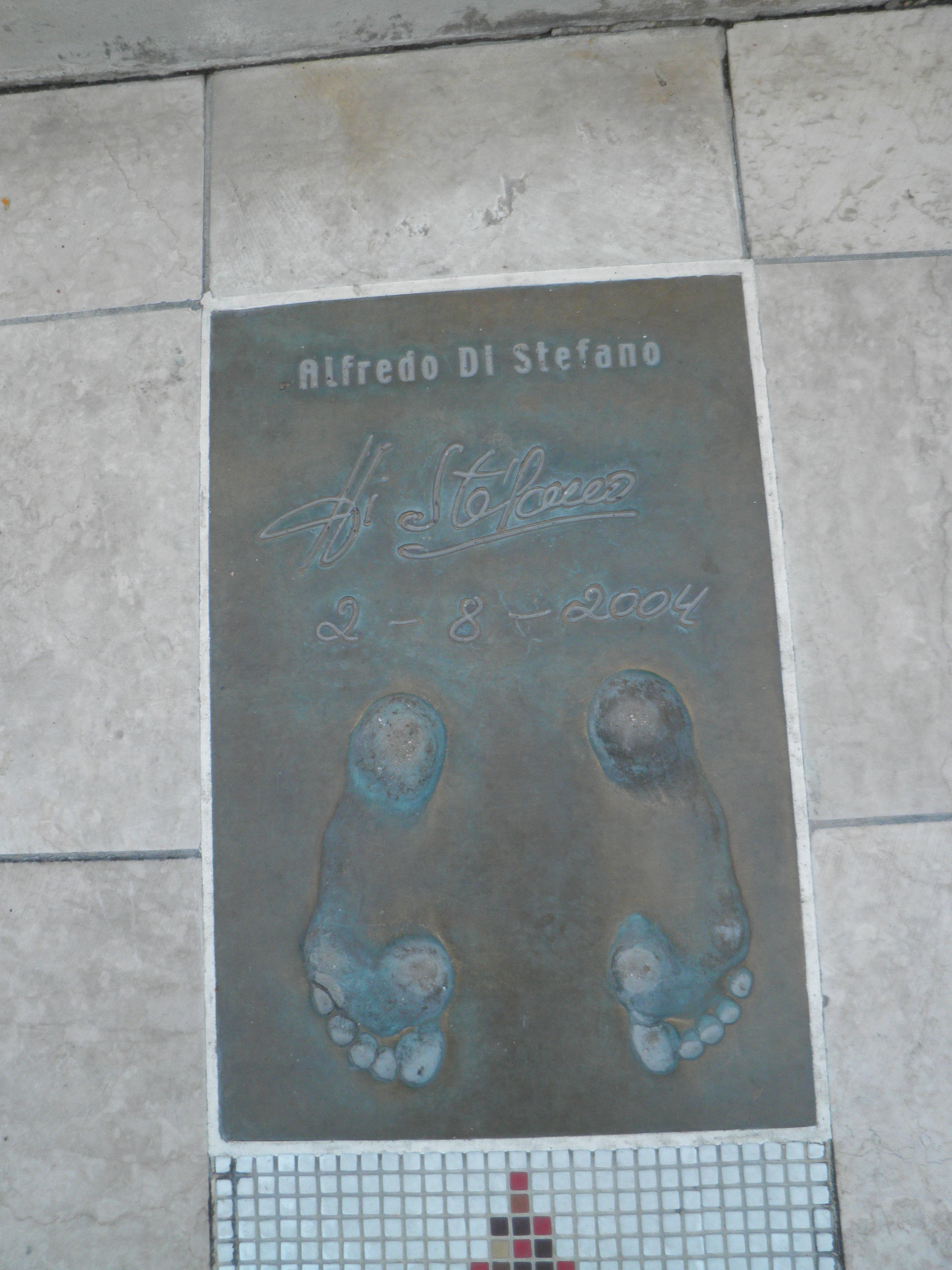
Di Stéfano's Golden Foot award in "The Champions Promenade" on the seafront of the Principality of Monaco

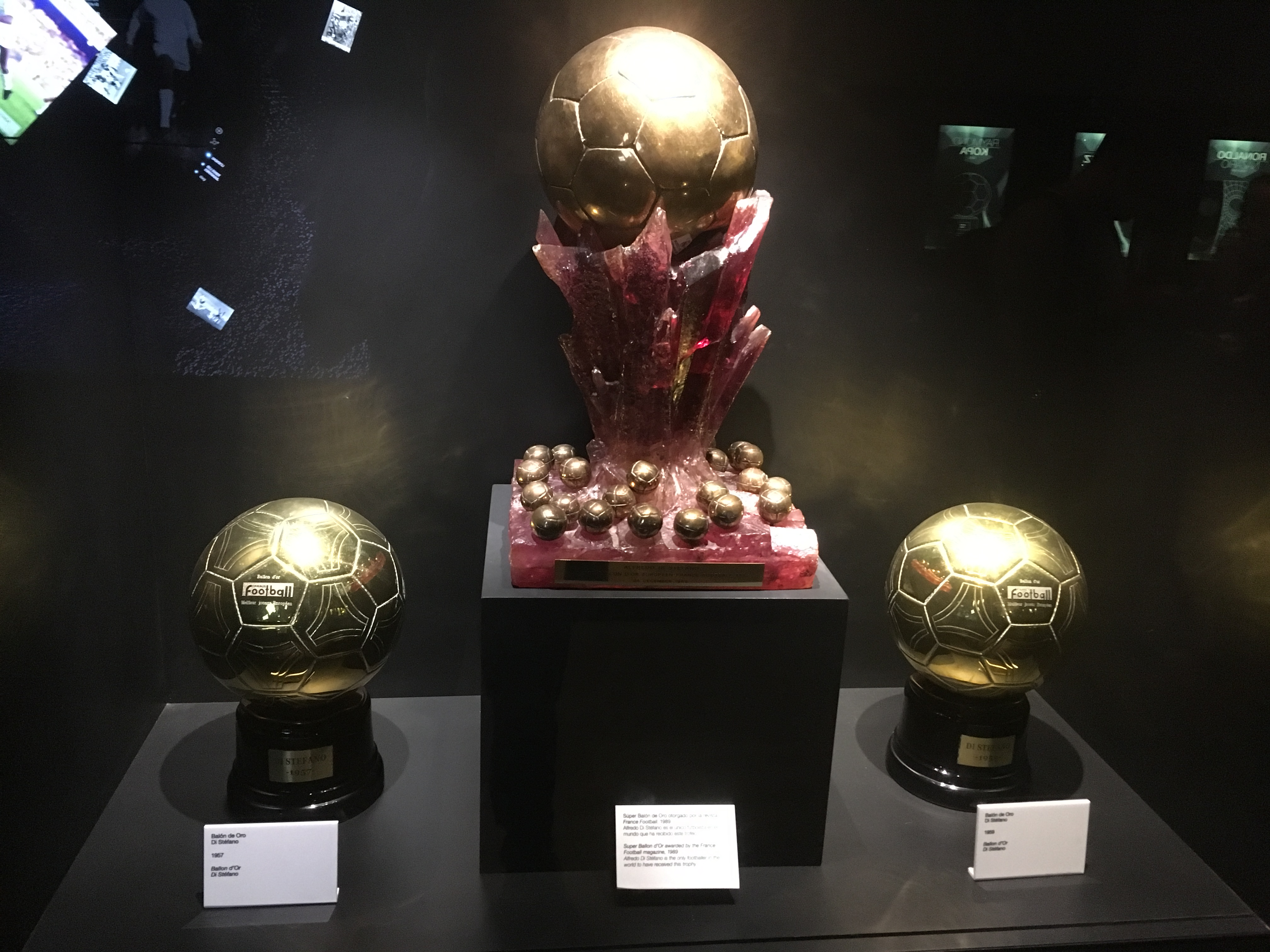
The two Ballon d'Ors (1957 and 1959) and Super Ballon d'Or (1989) won by Di Stéfano

River Plate

- Argentine Primera División: 1945, 1947
- Copa Aldao: 1947
- South American Championship of Champions runner-up: 1948

Millonarios

- Campeonato Profesional: 1949, 1951, 1952
- Copa Colombia: 1953
- Small Club World Cup (Non-official): 1953

Real Madrid

- La Liga: 1953–54, 1954–55, 1956–57, 1957–58, 1960–61, 1961–62, 1962–63, 1963–64
- Copa del Generalísimo: 1961–62
- European Cup: 1955–56, 1956–57, 1957–58, 1958–59, 1959–60; runner-up: 1961–62, 1963–64
- Latin Cup: 1955, 1957
- Intercontinental Cup: 1960
- Tournoi de Paris runner-up: 1957
- Small Club World Cup (Non-official): 1956

Argentina

- South American Championship: 1947

Individual

- Super Ballon d'Or: 1989
- Ballon d'Or: 1957, 1959; runner-up: 1956
- Argentine Primera División top scorer: 1947
- Campeonato Profesional top scorer: 1951, 1952
- Pichichi Trophy: 1953–54, 1955–56, 1956–57, 1957–58 (joint), 1958–59
- Small Club World Cup top scorer: 1956
- European Cup top scorer: 1957–58
- Spanish Player (Athlete) of the Year: 1957, 1959, 1960, 1964
- FIFA Order of Merit: 1994
- World Soccer World XI: 1960, 1961, 1962, 1963, 1964
- World Team of the 20th Century: 1998
- World Soccer The Greatest Players of the 20th century: 6th (1999)
- FIFA 100: 2004
- UEFA Jubilee Awards – Golden Player of Spain: 2004
- Golden Foot: 2004, as football legend
- UEFA President's Award: 2007
- Copa América Historical Dream Team: 2011
- World Soccer Greatest XI of all time: 2013
- IFFHS Top 10 Europe's Best Players of the 20th century: 3rd
- IFFHS Legends
- Ballon d'Or Dream Team (Silver): 2020
- 11Leyendas Jornal AS: 2021
- IFFHS All-time Men's B Dream Team: 2021
- IFFHS South America Men's Team of All Time: 2021
- IFFHS World's Best Man Player of All Time: 9th (2025)

=== Manager ===
Boca Juniors

- Primera División: 1969 Nacional
- Copa Argentina: 1969

River Plate

- Primera División: 1981 Nacional

Valencia

- La Liga: 1970–71
- European Cup Winners' Cup: 1979–80
- Segunda División: 1986–87
- Copa del Rey runner-up (2): 1970–71, 1971–72

Real Madrid

- Supercopa de España: 1990

=== Records ===
- Scored in most European Cup finals: five
- Scored in most consecutive European Cup finals: five
- Most goals scored in European Cup finals: seven (shared with Ferenc Puskás)
- Only player to be awarded the Super Ballon d'Or

== See also ==
- List of men's footballers with 500 or more goals
- List of footballers who achieved hat-trick records
