= Stefano Bartolini =

Italian political scientist (1952-)

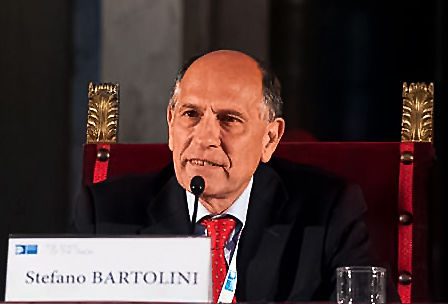
Stefano Bartolini, 2013

Stefano Bartolini (born January 22, 1952) is an Italian political scientist and professor at European University Institute in Florence, Italy. He is the author of many books and publications.

== Activities ==
Bartolini is the editor of the Italian political science journal, Italian Political Science Review.

Bartolini's research in political science includes research on electoral changes in Europe during the 1980s, which found that gains and losses at the party level did not translate into large changes at the bloc level. In terms of aggregate scores, the gains of parties within a bloc, whether left-wing or right-wing, were offset by the losses of other parties within the same bloc.

According to Bartolini, the integration of Europe reverses the centuries-long process of national boundary construction. This provides "exit options" for individuals who had previously been bounded to their nation of birth.

== Awards ==
- 1990: UNESCO 'Stein Rokkan' Prize for the best book in social sciences (for: Identity, Competition, and Electoral Availability, Cambridge 1990)
- 2001: Gregory Luebbert Award for best book in Comparative Politics, American Political Science Association (for: The Class Cleavage, Cambridge, 2000)
- 2002: Best book on European Politics, Division of European Politics, American Political Science Association (for: The Class Cleavage, Cambridge).
- 2007: EUSA; European Union Studies Association, HONORABLE MENTION to the book ‘Restructuring Europe’ Oxford 2005.
- 2022 Member of the Academia Europae

== Publications ==
=== Books ===
- 1978. Progetto per l'Europa, S. Bartolini et al, Torino, EDA.
- 1981. Riforma Istituzionale e sistema politico. La Francia Gollista, Bologna, Il Mulino.
- 1984. Party Politics in Contemporary Europe (co-edited with P. Mair), London, Frank Cass.
- 1986. Manuale di Scienza Politica, Bologna, Il Mulino, (with M. Cotta, L. Morlino, A. Panebianco et G. Pasquino) (Spanish edition: Manual de ciencia política, Madrid, Alianza Universidad Textos, 1991).
- 1990. Identity, Competition, and Electoral Availability. The Stabilisation of European Electorates 1885-1985, (with P. Mair) Cambridge, Cambridge University Press.
- 1995. Maggioritario ma non troppo. Le elezioni politiche del 1994, (co-edited with R. D'Alimonte), Bologna, Il Mulino.
- 1997. Maggioritario per caso. Le elezioni politiche del 1996, (co-edited with R. D'Alimonte), Bologna, Il Mulino.
- 1998. Party and Party Systems. A Bibliographic Guide to the Literature on Parties and Party Systemns in Europe since 1945, (with S. Hug and D. Caramani), London, Sage Publications, 708 pp.
- 2000. The Class Cleavage. The Electoral Mobilisation of the European Left 1880-1980, Cambridge (Mass.), Cambridge University Press.
- 2005. Restructuring Europe. Centre formation, system building and political structuring between the nation state and the EU. Oxford: Oxford University Press.
- 2018. The Political, Colchester, Essex/, Lanham, MD, ECPR Press/Rowman and Littlefield. (Italian translation Il Politico. Teoria dell’azione politica nucleare, Brescia, Editrice Morcelliana, 2022)
- 2022. Rule-Making Rules. A framework for political institutions, Cambridge, Cambridge University Press (forthcoming September 2022)
