= Palazzo Bartolini-Torrigiani =

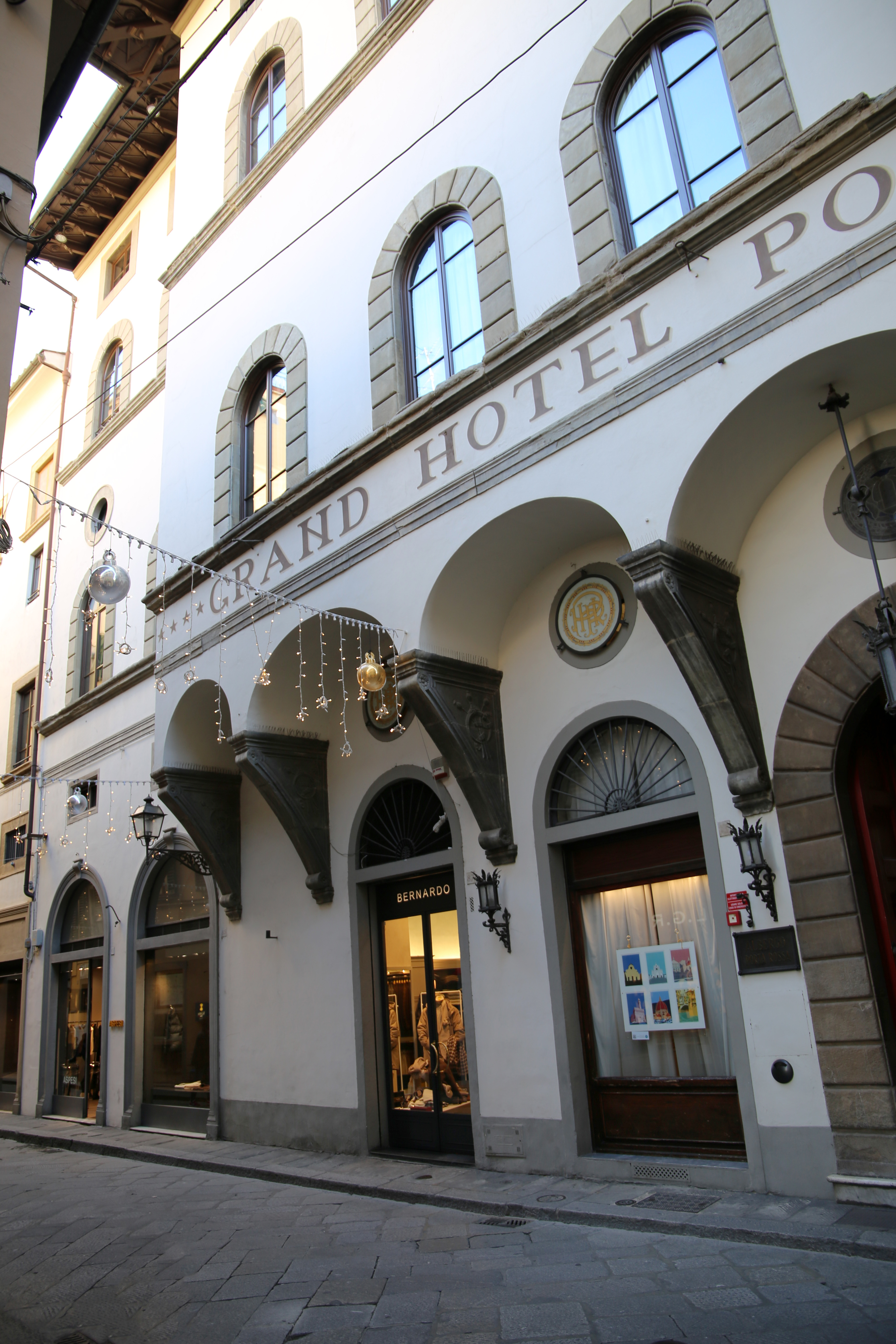

- Location within Florence

General information
- Coordinates: 43.770072°N 11.253889°E
- Construction started: 13th century
- Owner: Hotel Porta Rossa

The Palazzo Bartolini-Torrigiani is a palace located between Via Porta Rossa and Via delle Terme, in the city block just west of Piazza Santa Trinita that includes the Palazzo Bartolini Salimbeni, in the center of the city of Florence, region of Tuscany, Italy. This portion of the block includes the medieval Torre dei Monaldi, also known as della Rognosa, rising along Via Porta Rossa.

Buildings here had been present since the 13th century, owned by the Spini and Scali families. By 1369, the property around the tower, named for the Monaldi family, became property of Costanza del Mula Soldanieri, wife of Neri di Lapo, nel 1369. An inn, known as the Albergho di Porta Rossa or Locanda del Cammello was located here in 1386. In 1477, Bartolomeo Bartolini bought these buildings, including the tower.

The Bartolini had owned property in this sector since 1348. They progressively extended their holdings till by the 16th century they owned nearly the entire city block. The best known construction for the family here was the palace on Piazza Santa Trinita.

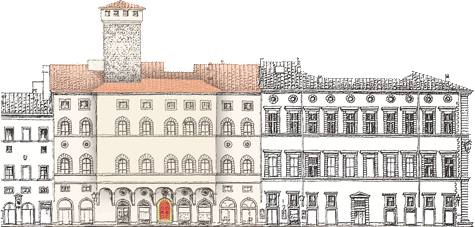
Facades along Via Porta Rossa

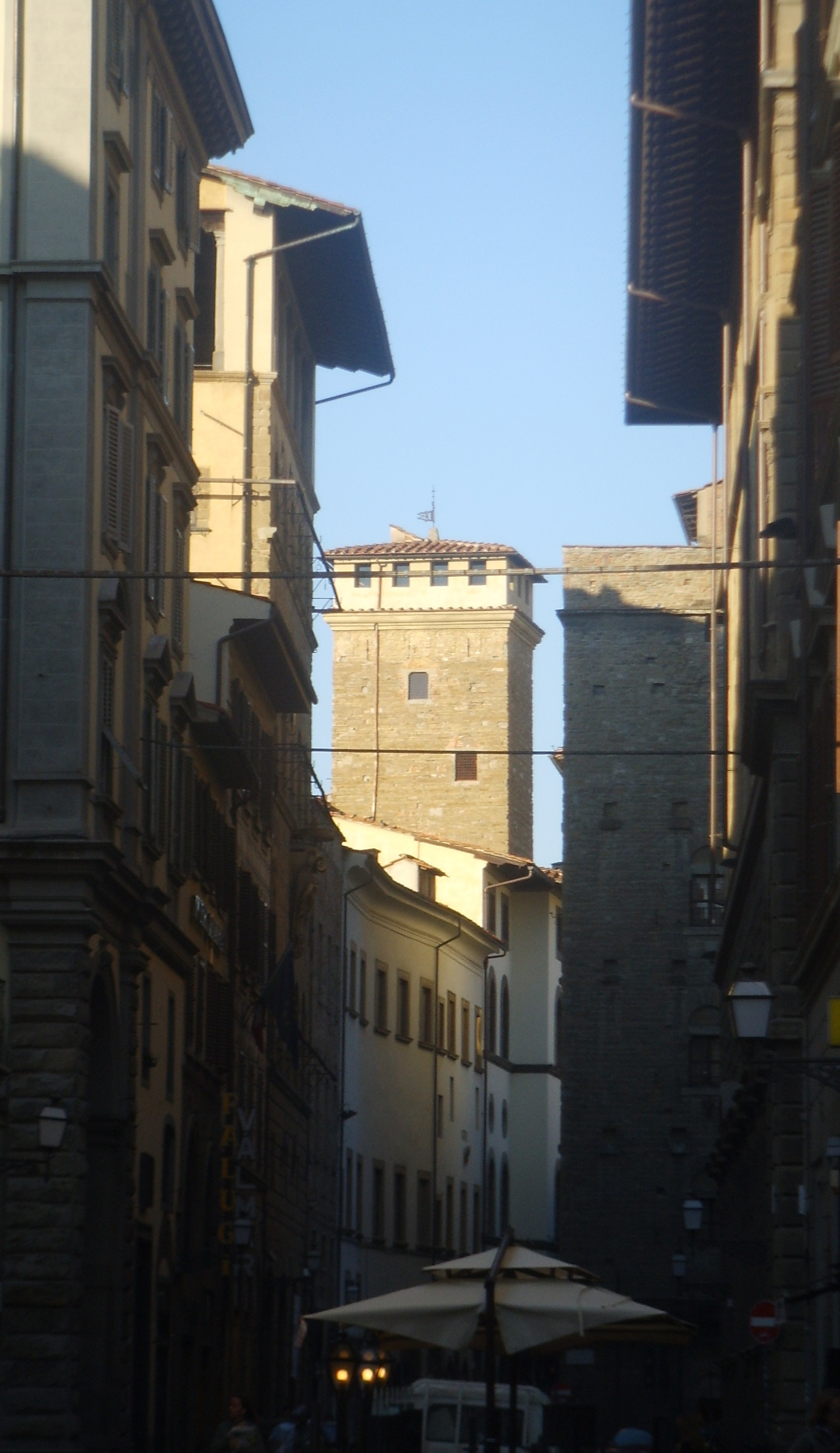
Torre dei Monaldi, street view

By the mid-16th century, the property here was sold to the Dati, then in 1559 to the Torrigiani, whose descendants still own the property, now occupied by the Hotel Porta Rossa. The building has undergone various refurbishments and reconstructions over the centuries.
