= Sara Bartoli =

Italian woman who, as a child, was said to have protected the Pope

Sara Bartoli is better known as the "Angel Baby Who Protected the Pope". On May 13, 1981, Mehmet Ali Ağca shot Pope John Paul II as he entered St. Peter's Square. It would be later revealed that the shooter held off the shot when he saw the Pope hold baby Sara in the air. Mehmet would wait until the baby was safe. Sara was 18 months old at the time and in a blue dress.

At the time of John Paul II's death on April 2, 2005, Sara was a 25-year-old mother-to-be living in Lariano, Italy.

== Bibliography ==
- ABC News
