= Bartholin =

Bartholin is a Danish surname. Notable people with the surname include:

- Caspar Bartholin the Elder (1585–1629), Danish polymath, physician, and theologian
- Caspar Bartholin the Younger (1655–1738), Danish anatomist, son of Thomas Bartholin; eponym of Bartholin's gland, and subsequently Bartholin's cyst
- Gustav Bartholin Hagen, (1873–1941), Danish architect
- Janus Andreas Bartholin la Cour, (1837–1909), Danish painter
- Jorge Cuevas Bartholín, (1885–1961), Chilean-born ballet impresario and choreographer
- Rasmus Bartholin (1625–1698), Danish physician and grammarian, son of Caspar Bartholin the Elder
- Thomas Bartholin (1616–1680), Danish physician, mathematician, and theologian, son of Caspar Bartholin the Elder
