= Giuseppe Bartoli =

Giuseppe Bartoli (27 February 1717 – 1788) was an Italian antiquarian, and literary scholar, working mainly in Turin.

== Biography ==
Giuseppe Bartoli was born in Padua, and there he studied at the seminary, where among his teachers was the Cardinal Giovanni Francesco Barbarigo. He then gained an apprenticeship under the professors of Greek at the University of Padua, Domenico Lazzarini and Jacopo Giacometti. He also studied law under professor Giuseppe Alaleona, obtaining a doctorate in 1736. His aversion to being a jurist led him to run a school in Padua for a few years. In 1745, he was named professor of belle-lettere and eloquence at the University of Turin. He was named the royal antiquarian, and this allowed him to travel extensively. He published extensively on classical literature.
