= Giovanni Bartoli =

Italian sculptor and jewelmaker

Giovanni Bartoli was an Italian sculptor and jewelmaker of the 14th century in Rome. In 1369, he completed for Pope Urban V, silver busts of Saints Peter and Paul for San Giovanni Laterano.

== Bibliography ==
- Ticozzi, Stefano (1830). Dizionario degli architetti, scultori, pittori, intagliatori in rame ed in pietra, coniatori di medaglie, musaicisti, niellatori, intarsiatori d'ogni etá e d'ogni nazione' (Volume 1) (in Italian). Milan: Gaetano Schiepatti. p. 114.
