= Bartolini =

Bartolini is an Italian surname. Notable people with the surname include:

- Andrea Bartolini (born 1968), Italian motocross driver
- Domenico Bartolini (1880–1960), Italian politician
- Elia Bartolini (born 2003), Italian motorcycle racer
- Elio Bartolini (1922–2006), Italian writer
- Enzo Bartolini (1914–1998), Italian rower
- Giancarlo Bartolini Salimbeni (1916–2000), Italian film director
- Gioseffo Maria Bartolini (1657–1725), Italian painter
- Lando Bartolini (1937–2024), Italian opera singer
- Lorenzo Bartolini (1777–1850), Italian sculptor
- Louisa Grace Bartolini (1818–1865), British writer and artist
- Luigi Bartolini (1892–1963), Italian writer
- Massimo Bartolini (born 1962), Italian artist
- Nello Bartolini (1904–1956), Italian long-distance runner
- Nicola Bartolini (born 1996), Italian artistic gymnast
- Nicola Bartolini Carrassi (born 1971), Italian voice actor and writer
- Orfeo Bartolini (1952–2003), Italian murdered in Afghanistan
- Sebastián Bartolini (born 1982), Argentine footballer
- Simone Bartolini, Italian singer
- Stefano Bartolini (born 1952), Italian political scientist

== See also ==
- Bartolini (disambiguation)
