= Adolfo Bartoli =

Italian physicist

Adolfo Bartoli (19 March 1851 – 18 July 1896) was an Italian physicist, who is best known for introducing the concept of radiation pressure from thermodynamical considerations.

Born in Florence, Bartoli studied physics and mathematics at the University of Pisa until 1874. He was a professor of physics at the Technical Institute of Arezzo from 1876, at the University of Sassari from 1878, at the Technical Institute of Firenze from 1879, at the University of Catania from 1886 to 1893, and at the University of Pavia from 1893.

In 1874 James Clerk Maxwell found out that the existence of tensions in the ether, in other words radiation pressure, follows from his electromagnetic theory. In 1876 Bartoli derived the existence of radiation pressure from thermodynamics, and his derivation influenced Boltzmann.

Like how the thermodynamics of gas is independent of microscopic details of what gas is, his derivation does not depend on a theory of what light is, such as Maxwell's electromagnetism. In contrast, Maxwell predicted radiation pressure directly from his theory of electromagnetism. Therefore, radiation pressure was also called "Maxwell-Bartoli pressure".

Later the radiation pressure played an important role in the work of Albert Einstein in connection with mass–energy equivalence and the photoelectric effect. Einstein lived in Pavia at that time (1895), when Bartoli held the physics chair at the local university. However, it is unknown whether Einstein was directly influenced by Bartoli.

Bartoli died in Pavia in 1896.

== Bartoli's argument for radiation pressure ==
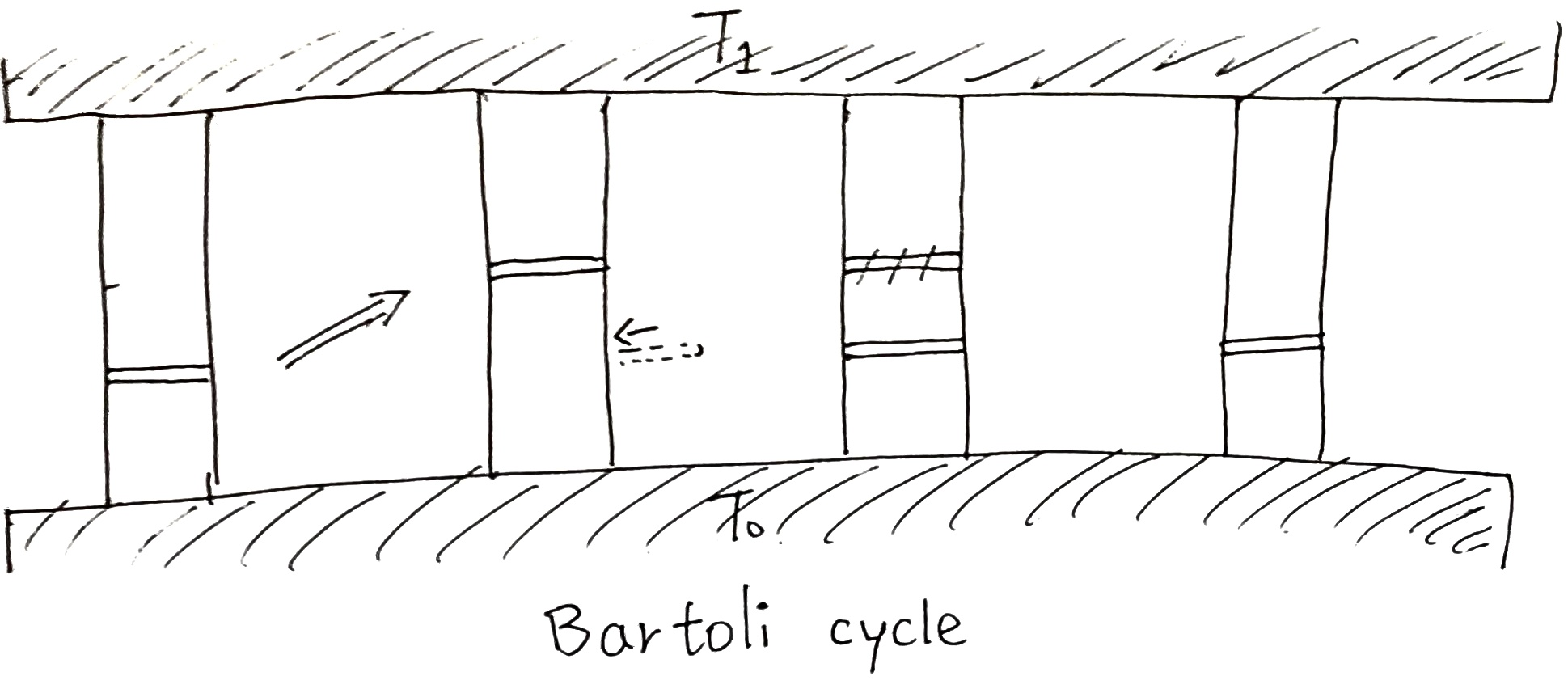

Consider a perfectly reflexive piston with a mirror in the middle, and two black bodies connected to two heat baths at its two ends. One body is hot at temperature $T_1$, and the other is cold at temperature $T_0$. Now, consider the following heat-engine cycle:

- Move the mirror towards the hot body. The hot body would be forced to absorb photons, while the cold body would be forced to emit more photons to fill the space.
- Insert another mirror in the middle.
- Remove the first mirror, and wait for the radiation trapped between the two mirrors to reach equilibrium with the hot body.

With one cycle, we have pumped energy away from the cold body. Since the energy has nowhere else to go, it must have ended up in the hot body. If light has no pressure, then this transports energy from a colder to a hotter body. To avoid this violation of the second law of thermodynamics, it is necessary that light imparts pressure to the mirror.

== Selected publications ==
- with G. Poloni: Bartoli, A.; Poloni, E. G. (1871). "Sopra un fenomeno dell'Elettrolisi". Il Nuovo Cimento. 5 (1): 292–295. Bibcode:1871NCim....5..292B. doi:10.1007/BF02718646. S2CID 123050347.
- Bartoli, A. G. (1876). Sopra i movimenti prodotti dalla luce e dal calore: e sopra il radiometro di Crookes. Firenze: Coi tipi dei successori le Monnier.
- Exner, Dr. F. (1884). "Die strahlende Wärme und der zweite Hauptsatz der mechanischen Wärmetheorie".
- "L'elettricità : il carbonio e la generazione spontanea". 1886.
- with E. Stracciati: "Misure actinometriche del raffreddamento notturno eseguite sull'Etna : nota preliminare dei professori". 1890.
- with E. Stracciati: "Misura della potenza chimica delle radiazioni solari". Bollettino dell'Accademia Gioenia. 16. 1891.
- with E. Stracciati: Bartoli, A.; Stracciati, E. (1891). "Misure del calore solare eseguite in Italia dal 1885 in poi". Il Nuovo Cimento. 29 (1): 63. Bibcode:1891NCim...29...63B. doi:10.1007/BF02718603. S2CID 120385496.
- Bartoli, Adolfo (1891). "Sul calore specifico fino ad alta temperatura delle lave dell'Etna e di altri vulcani". Il Nuovo Cimento. 29 (1): 131–136. Bibcode:1891NCim...29..131B. doi:10.1007/BF02718606. S2CID 122709550.
- with E. Stracciati: "Il calore specifico dell'acqua". Atti D. Accad. Gioenia di Scienze Natural. 1892.
- Bartoli, Adolfo (1892). "Sul calore specifico fino ad alta temperatura di alcune roccie della Sicilia". Il Nuovo Cimento. 30 (1): 231–235. Bibcode:1891NCim...30..231B. doi:10.1007/bf02718484. S2CID 121014967.
- "Di alcune recenti misure calorimetriche ed in particolare della misura del calore solare : Discorso letto nell'inaugurazione dell'anno accademico 1893- 94 della r. Università di Pavia il Giorno 4 novembre 1893". 1894.
- with E. Stracciati & G. Raffo: Catania, Accademia Gioenia di Scienze Naturali in (1894). "Misure pireliometriche eseguite durante l'eclisse solare del 16 aprile 1893". Il Nuovo Cimento. 1 (1): 76–86. Bibcode:1895NCim....1...76B. doi:10.1007/BF02719961. S2CID 120819890.
