= Giorgio Barbolini =

Italian footballer (1934–2022)

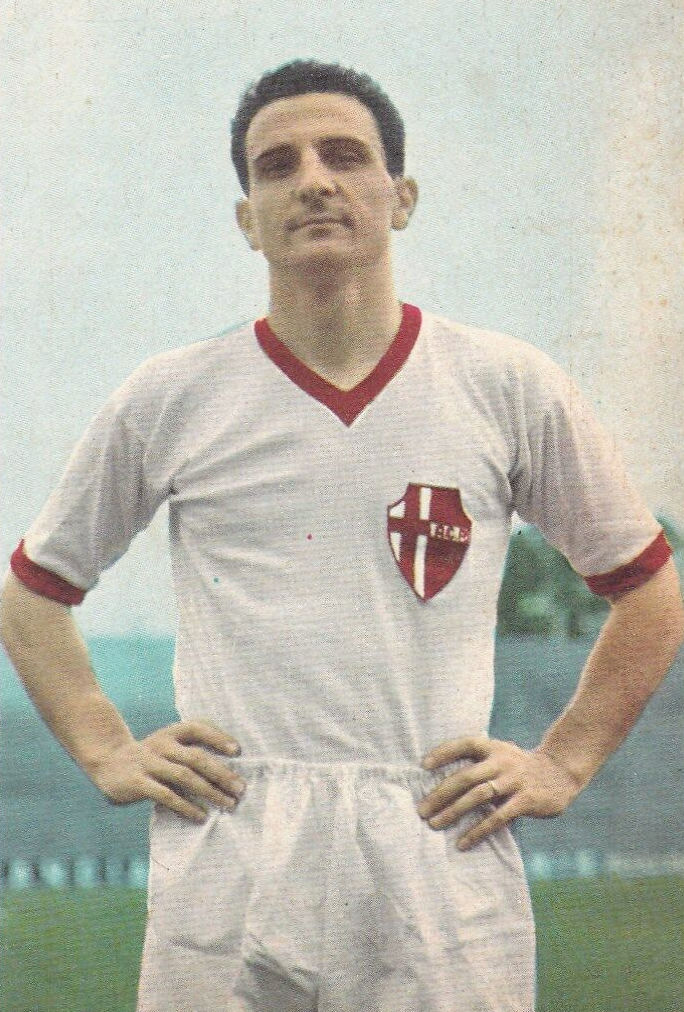
- Barbolini with Padova in 1961

Personal information
- Date of birth: 30 April 1934
- Place of birth: Modena, Italy
- Date of death: 18 June 2022 (aged 88)
- Place of death: Modena
- Height: 1.74 m (5 ft 9 in)
- Position: Midfielder

Senior career*
Years	Team	Apps	(Gls)
1952–1954	Modena	1	(0)
1954–1955	Reggiana	33	(15)
1955–1956	Modena	30	(13)
1956–1957	Roma	17	(3)
1957–1959	Modena	65	(15)
1959	Inter Milan	0	(0)
1960–1968	Padova	232	(8)
Total		378	(54)
- * Club domestic league appearances and goals

Giorgio Barbolini (30 April 1934 – 18 June 2022) was an Italian professional footballer who played as a midfielder.

He was born in Modena. He played four seasons (84 games, 5 goals) in the Serie A for A.S. Roma and Calcio Padova. In his season with Inter Milan he only played in Coppa Italia, scoring once.

His younger brothers Gianni Barbolini and Ermanno Barbolini also played football professionally. To distinguish them, Giorgio was referred to as Barbolini I, Gianni as Barbolini II and Ermanno as Barbolini III.

Barbolini died on 18 June 2022, at the age 88.
