= Julio Cozzi =

Argentine footballer (1922–2011)

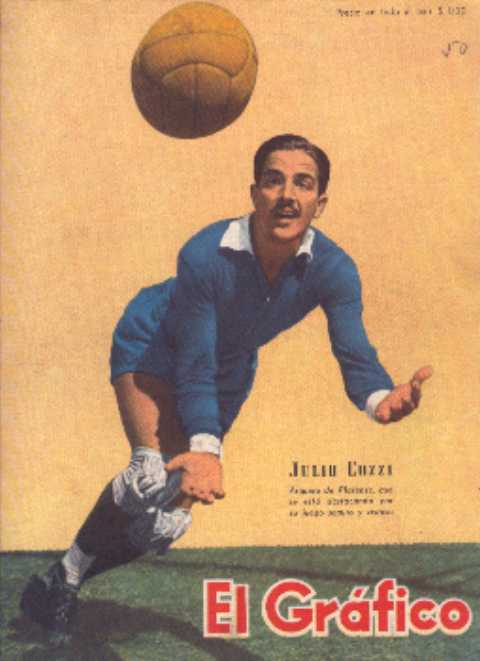

Personal information
- Full name: Julio Adolfo Cozzi
- Date of birth: 14 July 1922
- Place of birth: Buenos Aires, Argentina
- Date of death: 25 September 2011 (aged 89)
- Place of death: Buenos Aires, Argentina
- Height: 1.78 m (5 ft 10 in)
- Position: Goalkeeper

Senior career*
Years	Team	Apps	(Gls)
1941–1949	Platense	196	(0)
1950–1954	Millonarios	88	(1)
1955	Platense	(see above)	
1956–1958	Independiente	73	(0)
1959–1960	Banfield		
1961	Millonarios		

International career
	Argentina	6	(0)
- * Club domestic league appearances and goals

Julio Adolfo Cozzi (14 July 1922 – 25 September 2011) was an Argentine football goalkeeper who won the Copa América 1947 with the Argentina national team.

Cozzi started his career in 1941 with Club Atlético Platense. He played for the club until 1949 when he joined Millonarios of Colombia where his teammates included Alfredo di Stéfano and Adolfo Pedernera.

Cozzi returned to Platense in 1955, he went on to play for Independiente between 1956 and 1959 and then Banfield of the Argentine 2nd division.

On 25 September 2011, he suffered a heart attack and died at the Clinic Fundación Favaloro in Buenos Aires.

== Titles ==
Season	Team	Title
1947	Argentina	Copa América
1949	Millonarios	Colombian league
1951	Millonarios	Colombian league
1952	Millonarios	Colombian league
1952-53	Millonarios	Copa Colombia
1953	Millonarios	Colombian league
1953	Millonarios	Pequeña Copa del Mundo
