= 1957 Small Club World Cup =

Tournament details
- Host country: Venezuela
- Dates: 29 June – 18 July
- Teams: 4 (from 2 associations)
- Venue: 1 (in 1 host city)

Final positions
- Champions: (Spain) Barcelona (1st title)

Tournament statistics
- Matches played: 12
- Goals scored: 45 (3.75 per match)
- Top scorer(s): (Uruguay) Ramón Villaverde (6 goals)

The 1957 Small Club World Cup (officially, "Copa República de Venezuela") was the sixth edition of the Small Club World Cup, a tournament held in Venezuela between 1952 and 1957, in certain years between 1963 and 1970, and in 1975. It was played by four participants, half from Europe and half from South America in double round robin format, and featured star players like Didi and Garrincha for Botafogo, Uruguayan Ramón Villaverde who reappeared after the 1953 edition, goalkeeper Antoni Ramallets, Estanislau Basora, and Brazilian Evaristo for Barcelona, goalkeeper Roberto Sosa, Héctor Núñez, and Guillermo Escalada for Nacional de Montevideo, and Marcelino Campanal for Sevilla. Also, future Real Madrid defender José Santamaría was in Nacional's squad.

This was the last edition of the championship with its original name and degree of importance. After the creation of the European Champions Cup, the efforts of European clubs were all to dispute the then fledgling Cup, emptying the Venezuelan tournament. Real Madrid, European champions in 1955–56, participated in the 1956 competition; but after retaining their European title in 1956–57, Real Madrid did not attend the 1957 edition of the Venezuelan tournament, which ended up being the last tournament in this original series. Other invited teams that did not contest the competition were Lazio, Atlético Madrid, Athletic Bilbao, and Fluminense.

Spanish team Barcelona won the competition, achieving their first title, with Uruguayan forward Ramón Villaverde being the topscorer with 6 goals. Other editions would happen without regularity, named Trophy City of Caracas, from 1963, but without the same quality of the participants.

== Participants ==
Team	Qualification
(Spain) Sevilla	2nd. in 1956–57 La Liga
(Spain) Barcelona	3rd. in 1956–57 La Liga
(Brazil) Botafogo	3rd. in 1956 Campeonato Carioca
(Uruguay) Nacional	Champions of 1956 Primera División

== Matches ==
29 Jun

Botafogo (Brazil)	2–0	(Spain) Sevilla
Pampolini 2'; Paulinho 53'	Report

Estadio Olímpico, Caracas
Referee: Héctor Osorio (Venezuela)

30 Jun

Barcelona (Spain)	4–0	(Uruguay) Nacional
Villaverde 4', 59', 78'; Tejada 63'	Report

Estadio Olímpico, Caracas
Referee: Benito Jackson (Venezuela)

4 Jul

Nacional (Uruguay)	2–2	(Spain) Sevilla
Bruzzesi 14'; Núñez 67'	Report	Quirro 33'; Domenech 41'

Estadio Olímpico, Caracas
Referee: Luis Yanes

5 Jul

Barcelona (Spain)	3–0	(Brazil) Botafogo
Tejada 5', 75'; Evaristo 27'	Report

Estadio Olímpico, Caracas
Referee: Isidoro Trapote (Venezuela)

7 Jul

Botafogo (Brazil)	4–0	(Uruguay) Nacional
Didi 5'; Quarentinha 43'; Paulinho 56', 70'	Report

Estadio Olímpico, Caracas
Referee: Héctor Osorio (Venezuela)

8 Jul

Barcelona (Spain)	3–2	(Spain) Sevilla
Evaristo 18', 30', 42'	Report	Quirro 1'; Maraver 58'

Estadio Olímpico, Caracas
Referee: Benito Jackson (Venezuela)

9 Jul

Botafogo (Brazil)	4–0	(Spain) Sevilla
Paulinho 14'; Garrincha 39', 85'; Didi 60'	Report

Estadio Olímpico, Caracas
Referee: Luis Yanes

11 Jul

Barcelona (Spain)	3–2	(Uruguay) Nacional
Villaverde 13', 25'; Evaristo 30'	Report	Souto 2'; Núñez 75'

Estadio Olímpico, Caracas
Referee: Isidoro Trapote (Venezuela)

13 Jul

Barcelona (Spain)	2–2	(Spain) Sevilla
Gensana 30'; Basora 67'	Report	Ramoní 48'; Pauet 70'

Estadio Olímpico, Caracas
Referee: Héctor Osorio (Venezuela)

13 Jul

Nacional (Uruguay)	2–2	(Brazil) Botafogo
Escalada 10'; Romero 44'	Report	Paulinho 20'; Edison 21'

Estadio Olímpico, Caracas
Referee: Benito Jackson (Venezuela)

16 Jul

Sevilla (Spain)	3–1	(Uruguay) Nacional
Payá 5'; Pepillo 47'; Arza 68'	Report	Herrera 70' (o.g.)

Estadio Olímpico, Caracas
Referee: Luis Yanes

18 Jul

Barcelona (Spain)	2–2	(Brazil) Botafogo
Basora 5'; Villaverde 35'	Report	Garrincha 65'; Neivaldo 75'

Estadio Olímpico, Caracas
Referee: Isidoro Trapote (Venezuela)

== Final standing ==
Team	Pts	P	W	D	L	GF	GA	GD
(Spain) Barcelona	10	6	4	2	0	17	8	9
(Brazil) Botafogo	8	6	3	2	1	14	7	7
(Spain) Sevilla	4	6	1	2	3	9	14	−5
(Uruguay) Nacional	2	6	0	2	4	7	18	−11

== Topscorers ==
Rank	Player	Club	Goals
1	(Uruguay) Ramón Villaverde	(Spain) Barcelona	6
2	(Brazil) Evaristo	(Spain) Barcelona	5
2	(Brazil) Paulinho	(Brazil) Botafogo	5
3	(Brazil) Garrincha	(Brazil) Botafogo	3

== Champion ==
1957 Small Club World Cup
(Francoist Spain)
Barcelona
1st. title
