= Charles Nemeroff =

American psychiatrist (born 1949)

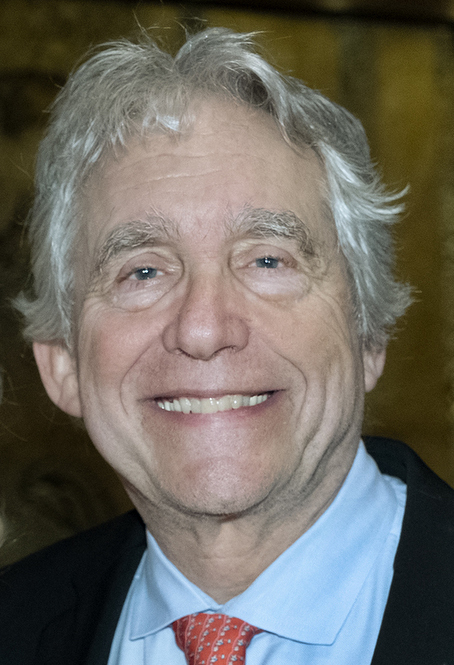
- Nemeroff in 2023
- Born: Charles Barnet Nemeroff; September 1949 (age 76–77); New York City, U.S.
- Education: University of North Carolina at Chapel Hill; Northeastern University; City College of New York
- Occupation: Psychiatrist
- Employer: University of Texas at Austin

Charles Barnet Nemeroff (born 1949) is an American psychiatrist known for his works about depression. He is the author of numerous textbooks, papers, and clinical studies.

== Early life and education ==
Nemeroff was born in New York City and attended the City College of New York. During his freshman year at the college, he visited Manhattan State Hospital where he decided to pursue his career studying mental illness. He also participated in an undergraduate research program sponsored by the National Science Foundation. Nemeroff went to work as a technician in a neuropathology laboratory in Boston after graduating in 1970. He subsequently returned to school where he received a master's degree in Biology in 1973 from Northeastern University. He then earned his PhD in neurobiology in 1973 and his M.D. in 1981, both from the University of North Carolina at Chapel Hill.

== Career ==
Nemeroff joined the faculty of Duke University after completing his training, then took a position at the Emory University School of Medicine in 1991. During his time at Emory, he built the psychiatry department into one of the field's leading centers and became internationally recognized as a leader in psychiatric research. In 2008, Nemeroff resigned from the position of chairman after Emory University found him in violation of policy for not disclosing payments received from drug makers for consulting fees. He was forbidden from applying for or being involved with any National Institutes of Health grants for a period of two years. At the time he left the university, he was considered one of the nation's most influential psychiatrists, having written more than 850 research reports and reviews.

In 2009, Nemeroff became the chair of psychiatry at the University of Miami Miller School of Medicine. During his time at Miami, Nemeroff was involved in the development of the university's psychiatry department, researching topics like mood disorders, aging, and HIV-related psychiatry.

In 2018, Nemeroff became chair and professor of psychiatry at the University of Texas at Austin Dell Medical School. He would also become holder of the Matthew P. Nemeroff Endowed Chair. Within the department, Nemeroff directs the Institute for Early Life Adversity Research, as part of the Mulva Clinic for the Neurosciences, and co-directs the Center for Psychedelic Research and Therapy.

In addition to his roles, Nemeroff is the owner of several patents in relation to treatment methods of depression. He has edited several textbooks, including the Textbook of Psychopharmacology distributed by the American Psychiatric Association.

=== Board roles ===
Nemeroff serves on the board of directors for the American Brain Coalition. Nemeroff has also served on advisory bodies for the National Institute of Mental Health and NASA. In addition to those roles, Nemeroff served as president of the Anxiety and Depression Association of America.

Nemeroff is a member of the American Psychiatric Association’s Council on Research, chairing both the APA Research Colloquium for Young Investigators and the APA Work Group on Biomarkers and Novel Treatments.

== Bibliography ==
- Corticotropin-Releasing Factor (1990) ISBN 9780849345500
- The Neurobiology of Depression (1998)
- Recognition and Treatment of Psychiatric Disorders (1999) ISBN 9780880489904
- The Corsini Encyclopedia of Psychology and Behavioral Science (2001) ISBN 9780471437277
- The Concise Corsini Encyclopedia of Psychology and Behavioral Science (2004) ISBN 9780471220367
- The Peace of Mind Prescription: An Authoritative Guide to Finding the Most Effective Treatment for Anxiety and Depression (2004) ISBN 9780618335022
- The Psychopharmacology Treatment Planner (2004) ISBN 9780471471257
- Principles of Psychopharmacology for Mental Health Professionals (2006) ISBN 9780471794622
- Neurobiology of Psychiatric Disorders: Volume 106 (2012)

== Recognition ==
Nemeroff has received multiple awards from organizations, including the American Psychiatric Association, the American College of Psychiatrists, and the American College of Neuropsychopharmacology. He was elected to the National Academy of Medicine in 2002 and named Alumnus of the Year by the University of North Carolina and its medical school.

=== Honorary degrees ===
Nemeroff received a Doctorate Honoris Causa from Maimonides University in 2015 and a Professor Honoris Causa from Favaloro University in 2021.
