= 1953 Small Club World Cup (1st tournament) =

Tournament details
- Host country: Venezuela
- Dates: 11 – 21 February
- Teams: 3 (from 2 associations)
- Venue: 1 (in 1 host city)

Final positions
- Champions: (Colombia) Millonarios (1st title)

Tournament statistics
- Matches played: 5
- Goals scored: 20 (4 per match)
- Top scorer(s): (Argentina) Alfredo Di Stéfano (4 goals)

The 1953 Small Club World Cup (first tournament) was the second edition of the Small Club World Cup, a tournament held in Venezuela between 1952 and 1957, in certain years between 1963 and 1970, and in 1975. It was played by four participants, half from Europe and half from South America but deviated from its usual double round robin format and featured players such as Angel Labruna, Amadeo Carrizo, Felix Loustau for River Plate, Gerhard Hanappi, Ernst Happel for Austria Wien, Nestor Rossi, Ramón Alberto Villaverde and Alfredo Di Stefano for Millonarios who played his last matches for the club in this tournament.

== Participants ==
Team	Qualification
(Argentina) River Plate	1952 Argentine Primera División champion
(Austria) Rapid Vienna	1951-52 Austrian champion, 1952 Mitropa Cup champion
(Colombia) Millonarios	1952 Campeonato Profesional champion

== Matches ==
1953 Small Club World Cup
10 February

Rapid Wien (Austria)	3–1	(Argentina) River Plate
Probst 24'; Dienst 50'; Hanappi 84'	Report	Labruna 18'

Estadio Olímpico, Caracas
Referee: M. Hain (Paraguay)

12 February

Millonarios (Colombia)	5–1	(Argentina) River Plate
Di Stéfano 12', 79'; Villaverde 34'; Báez 36'; Villalba 52'	Report	Prado 19'

Estadio Olímpico, Caracas
Attendance: 35,000
Referee: Benito Jackson (Venezuela)

14 February

River Plate (Argentina)	3–1	(Austria) Rapid Wien
Prado 10', 40'; Labruna 60'	Report	Hanappi 41'

Estadio Olímpico, Caracas
Referee: I. Trapote (Venezuela)

16 February

Millonarios (Colombia)	1–1	(Argentina) River Plate
Villaverde 57'	Report	Vernazza 87'

Estadio Olímpico, Caracas
Attendance: 35,000
Referee: Osorio (Venezuela)

18 February

Millonarios (Colombia)	4–0	(Austria) Rapid Wien
Di Stéfano 6', 35'; Villaverde 15'; Happel 20' (o.g.)	Report

Estadio Olímpico, Caracas
Attendance: 32,000
Referee: Benito Jackson (Venezuela)

== Final standings ==
Team	Pts	P	W	D	L	GS	GA	GD
(Colombia) Millonarios	7	3	2	1	0	10	2	+8
(Argentina) River Plate	3	4	1	1	2	6	10	-4
(Austria) Rapid Wien	2	3	1	0	2	4	8	-4

== Topscorers ==
Rank	Player	Club	Goals
1	(Argentina) Alfredo Di Stéfano	(Colombia) Millonarios	4
2	(Uruguay) Ramón Villaverde	(Colombia) Millonarios	3
2	(Argentina) Eliseo Prado	(Argentina) River Plate	3
4	(Argentina) Ángel Labruna	(Argentina) River Plate	2
4	(Austria) Gerhard Hanappi	(Austria) Rapid Wien	2

== Winners ==
1953 Small Club World Cup
(Colombia)
Millonarios
1st title
