= 2003 Altazor Awards =

4th Altazor Awards
- Date: 24 March 2003
- Venue: Centro Cultural Matucana 100
- Country: Chile

Television/radio coverage
- Network: TVN

The fourth annual Altazor Awards took place on 24 March 2003, at the Centro Cultural Matucana 100.

== Nominations ==
Winners are in bold text.

=== Literary Arts ===
==== Narrative ====
- Pía Barros – Los que sobran
- **Jaime Collyer – El habitante del Cielo**
- Alejandra Costamagna – Cansado ya del sol
- Hernán Rivera Letelier – Santa María de las flores negras

==== Poetry ====
- Claudio Bertoni – Jóvenes Buenas Mozas
- **Óscar Hahn – Apariciones profanas**
- Gonzalo Millán – Claroscuro
- Manuel Silva Acevedo – Día Quinto

==== Essay ====
- Rafael Gumucio – Monstruos Cardinales
- Bernardo Subercaseaux – Nación y Cultura en América Latina
- Armando Uribe – Memorias para Cecilia
- **Fernando Villagrán – Disparen a la bandada**

=== Visual Arts ===
==== Painting ====
- Gracia Barrios – Taller por Taller
- Pablo Domínguez – Oleos
- Matilde Pérez – Antes, hoy, siempre
- **Ricardo Yrarrázaval – Retrospectiva: 50 años**

==== Sculpture ====
- Marcela Correa – Natural Sintético
- Patricia Del Canto – In Illud Tempus
- **Cristián Salineros – Estructura natural**

==== Engraving and Drawing ====
- Florencia de Amesti – Collages y Dibujos
- Eduardo Garreaud – Fin de Partida II
- **Guillermo Núñez – Tiro al Blanco**
- Natasha Pons – Cuerpo Ausente

==== Installation art and Video art ====
- Gonzalo Díaz – Tratado del Entendimiento Humano
- Sebastián Preece – Intervenciones de utilidad pública
- **Lotty Rosenfeld – Moción de Orden**
- Alicia Villarreal – Ejercicio de copia

==== Photography ====
- Jorge Aceituno – Con Agua de Cielo
- Juan Domingo Marinello – Fotodigrafías de Identidad
- **Mariana Matthews – Ojo de Agua**
- Leonora Vicuña – Bares y garzones: un homenaje visual

=== Performing Arts Theatre ===
==== Dramaturgy ====
- Marco Antonio De la Parra – Las Costureras
- **Ana María Harcha and Francisca Bernardi – Kinder**
- Gustavo Meza – El Submarino Amarillo
- Juan Radrigán – Huidobro: Digo siempre adiós y me quedo

==== Director ====
- Alfredo Castro – Devastados (Blasted)
- Gustavo Meza – El Submarino Amarillo
- **Alejandro Trejo – Sor María Ignacio lo explica todo para usted**
- Jaime Vadell – Comida con amigos

==== Actor ====
- Luis Gnecco – Devastados (Blasted)
- Felipe Ríos – Esperando a Godot
- José Secall – Devuélveme el rosario de mi madre y quédate con todo lo de Marx
- **Pedro Vicuña – Titus Andrónicus**

==== Actress ====
- Heidrun Breier – Sor María Ignacio lo explica todo para usted
- María Izquierdo – El Derrumbe
- Amparo Noguera – Cartas Vencidas
- **Paulina Urrutia – Devastados (Blasted)**

=== Performing Arts Dance ===
==== Choreography ====
- Luis Eduardo Araneda – Cortometraje
- **Gigi Caciuleanu – Cuerpos**
- Valentina Pavez and Francisca Labbé – Mirror
- Francisca Sazié – Tercera Persona (Intruso)

==== Male Dancer ====
- Mauricio Barahona – Foto- Danza
- **César Morales – Romeo y Julieta**
- César Sepúlveda – Cuerpos
- Miguel Angel Serrano – Rosalinda

==== Female Dancer ====
- Natalia Berríos – Romeo y Julieta
- Paola Moret – Cuerpos
- Kana Nakao – Cortometraje
- **Paula Sacur – Pichanga**

=== Musical Arts ===
==== Classical music ====
- Pablo Délano – Cantata Navidad en Chile
- **Ensamble Contemporáneo – Pierrot-Lunaire**
- Ensamble Serenata – Puertas
- Silvia Sandoval Salas – Dirección Coro "Arsis XXI", recitantes y conjunto Instrumental. "Cantata Navidad en Chile"

==== Traditional music ====
- Nano Acevedo – Será la uva en abril que vendrá
- **Eduardo Parra. Tío Lalo – 80 son las razones**
- Mario Rojas & Grupo with Los Santiaguinos – Folklore Urbano
- Quelentaro – 8 de marzo

==== Ballad ====
- **Eduardo Gatti – Númina**
- Daniel Guerrero – Mañana
- Tati Penna – Tangos
- Alexis Venegas – Cierto día, Cierta Noche

==== Pop/Rock ====
- Chancho en Piedra – El Tinto Elemento
- Los Bunkers – Canción de Lejos
- Los Tetas – Tómala!
- **Matahari – Deja el cuerpo**

==== Alternative/Jazz ====
- Claudia Acuña – Rhythm of life
- Alfredo Espinoza – Jam Session en el Club de Jazz
- Emilio García – Ultrablues
- **Mariela González – En Privado**

==== Playing ====
- Edward Brown (English horn)
- Manuel Jiménez (Harp)
- **Celso López (Cello)**

=== Media Arts Film ===
==== Director Fiction ====
- Nicolás Acuña – Paraíso B
- Joaquín Eyzaguirre – Tres Noches de un Sábado
- Jorge Olguín – Sangre Eterna
- **Alejandro Rojas – Ogú y Mampato en Rapa Nui**

==== Director Documentary ====
- Patricio Guzmán – Madrid
- Paula Rodríguez – Volver a vernos
- **Marcela Said – I Love Pinochet**
- Iván Tziboulka – Gitanos sin carpa

==== Actor ====
- **Rodolfo Bravo – El Fotógrafo**
- Luis Dubó – Negocio Redondo
- Juan Pablo Ogalde – Paraíso B
- Nelson Villagra – Paraíso B

==== Actress ====
- Paulina García – Tres Noches de un Sábado
- **Carmen Disa Gutiérrez – Negocio Redondo**
- Tichi Lobos – Tres Noches de un Sábado
- Paola Volpato – Tres Noches de un Sábado

=== Media Arts TV ===
==== Director Drama ====
- Herbal Abreu – Más que amigos
- **Marcelo Ferrari – El Pozo (Ciclo Cuentos Chilenos)**
- María Eugenia Rencoret – Purasangre
- Vicente Sabatini – El Circo de las Montini

==== Director TV Show ====
- Francisco Gedda, Manuel Gedda, Juan Carlos Gedda, Ricardo Carrasco, Pedro Chaskel and María de los Angeles Nuño – Al Sur del Mundo
- **Cristian Leighton – Los Inmigrantes**
- Sebastián Lía – Ciento
- Patricia Mora – Viaje al Centro de la Música

==== Screenplay ====
- Néstor Castagno – Más que amigos
- Larisa Contreras, Alejandro Cabrera, Arnaldo Madrid, René Arcos, Daniella Lillo and Marcelo Leonart – Purasangre
- **Carolina Díaz and Cristián Leighton – Los Inmigrantes**
- Luis Ponce – Salado y Confitado (La Vida es una Lotería)

==== Actor ====
- Néstor Cantillana – El Circo de las Montini
- Francisco Pérez-Bannen – Purasangre
- **Mauricio Pesutic – Purasangre**
- José Soza – El Circo de las Montini

==== Actress ====
- Carolina Arregui – Buen Partido
- Paola Giannini – Purasangre
- Delfina Guzmán – El Circo de las Montini
- **Gloria Münchmeyer – Purasangre**
