= Deseo, carne y voluntad =

Deseo, Carne y Voluntad

Studio album by Candelabro
- Released: 3 October 2025
- Recorded: 2025
- Studios: Estudios del Sur and El Tercero, Santiago
- Genres: Art rock; progressive rock; post-rock; alternative rock
- Length: 73:48
- Language: Spanish
- Label: Registro Móvil
- Producers: Juan Diego Soto; Matías Ávila; Franco Arriagada

Candelabro chronology
Ahora o Nunca (2023)	Deseo, Carne y Voluntad (2025)

Deseo, Carne y Voluntad is the second studio album by the Chilean rock band Candelabro, released on 3 October 2025 on Registro Móvil. It was recorded at Estudios del Sur and El Tercero in Santiago, partly financed by a crowdfunding campaign run by the group's fan community. The album was mastered by Chalo González, and produced by Juan Diego Soto as well as frontman Matías Ávila and drummer Franco Arriagada.

Conceived as a concept album, the record addresses spirituality, guilt, grief, and contemporary Chilean identity through Catholic iconography interwoven with references to the country's contemporary political history. It also incorporates various elements of the poetry of several Chilean writers, such as Gabriela Mistral, Elvira Hernández, Nicanor Parra, and Armando Uribe.

The album was named the Chilean album of the year by the news outlet La Tercera. In 2026, it won the Pulsar Awards for Album of the Year and Best Rock Album.

== Recording and production ==
Deseo, Carne y Voluntad was recorded at Estudios del Sur and El Tercero, both in Santiago, with Juan Diego Soto, Carlos Doerr, and Emanuel Irarrázabal as recording engineers and with assistance from Catalina Salas, Javiera Hernández, and Nicolás Moris. Mastering was handled by Chalo González.

Much of the process—including the recording at Estudios del Sur—was paid for through a fundraising campaign (crowdfunding) among their followers, which led the group to describe the record as "an album made by and for the people". One of the first songs conceived for the album was "Ángel", which Ávila had originally begun writing as a university assignment before the band decided to make it the conceptual starting point of the album.

== Concept and content ==
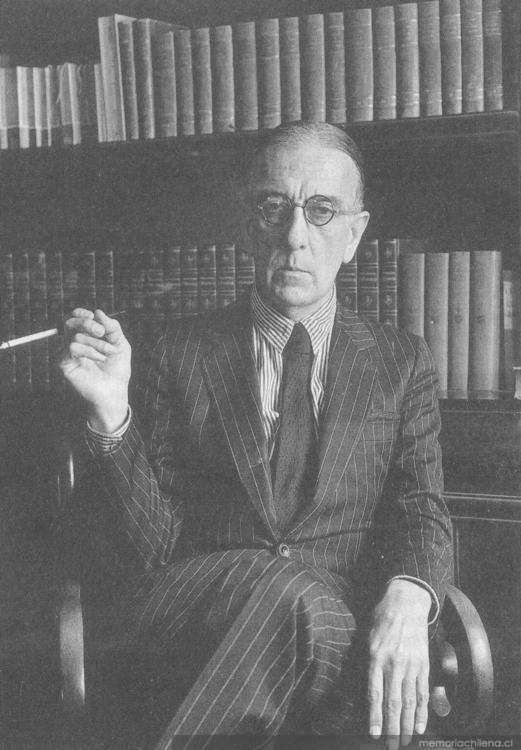
Armando Uribe, a Chilean poet whose work features in several of the album's songs

Deseo, Carne y Voluntad has been described by the band itself and by critics as a concept album that reinterprets Christian imagery—one of the symbolic pillars of Chilean identity—through personal experience, wounded spirituality, and collective memory, with references to illness, trauma, politics, and persistence. The album's cover is a drawing by keyboardist Javiera Donoso showing a lamb wearing a crown of thorns. According to her, the lamb on the cover represents the innocence and clumsiness of a generation that is only now beginning to face adult life.

The album opens with "Las Copas", an instrumental piece that incorporates a recording of the poet Elvira Hernández reciting a passage from her own poem "La bandera de Chile", and continues with "Domingo de Ramos", a song that draws on the imagery of the protest song "A desalambrar", written by Daniel Viglietti and popularized by Víctor Jara, to propose a rereading of the concept of homeland. "Ángel" is based on a popular Spanish-language prayer to the guardian angel, while "Liebre" features a spoken-word poetry passage recited by guitarist Luis Ayala. "Cáliz", the penultimate song on the album, includes spoken excerpts by Gabriela Mistral, Humberto Maturana, and other figures, addressing the idea of faith.

Alongside its spiritual component, the album develops an explicit social critique of Chilean society. "Pecado" ("Sin"), with ska arrangements, addresses the state's neglect of the Estación Central area of Santiago and its so-called "vertical ghettos". Samples from news broadcasts are used to place the blame for the situation on Rodrigo Delgado, a former mayor of Estación Central and former Minister of the Interior under Sebastián Piñera. Ávila, a music teacher, wrote the song after an incident during a school outing with his students that required crossing that area, in which they came across a naked homeless man. Referring to the song's message in a 2025 interview, he said: "There are no places where God is more absent than in those places, especially in Chile; for me, God is in the people who don't even have God as an image in their day-to-day lives, especially when it comes to considering something as inherently human as the figure of God, which doesn't exist in those places, for those families who can't live day to day without thinking about how to survive." The song closes with a recited excerpt from the poem "Éste ese y aquel tienen familias" ("This One, That One and the Other Have Families") by Armando Uribe, originally published in the collection Odio lo que odio.

"Tierra Maldita", originally written in response to the 2024 wildfires in the Valparaíso Region, instead offers a message of hope in the face of adversity, which is expanded on in the song "Fracaso". The latter has been adopted as an anthem of resilience following the victory of José Antonio Kast in the 2025 Chilean presidential elections, even though they took place months after the album's release.

== Release and promotion ==
"Tumba" was the only track released ahead of the album's release, through a music video that references the Andean festival of the Virgen de la Candelaria. After the full album's release, the band premiered the music video for "Prisión de Carne", directed by Germán Pavez, which was presented on 13 April 2026 at Citylab GAM and officially released on 17 April.

The album's release show took place on 20 May 2026 at La Cúpula in Parque O'Higgins, Santiago, with tickets selling out within minutes. In February 2026 the band announced its first tour of Spain, which included a performance at the Primavera Sound festival in Barcelona. Shortly afterwards, Candelabro confirmed a sold-out concert at the Teatro Caupolicán in Santiago, which The Clinic described as the biggest show of their career to date.

In February 2026, the Spanish label Sonido Muchacho issued the album in physical formats—CD and double LP—for the European market, in co-release with Registro Móvil.

== Reception ==
The album received widespread praise from Chilean and international critics. In La Tercera, Marcelo Contreras called it the Chilean album of the year, while his colleague Felipe Retamal named Candelabro the breakthrough band of Chilean rock in 2025. Critic Víctor Vk, writing in the Spanish outlet Sustrato, highlighted the album's conceptual ambition and its exploration of the tension between faith and hopelessness, although he considered that the compositional formula of several songs—with extended instrumental passages—is at times predictable. The album was also named Best Album of the Year 2025 in CityLab Global's "Esenciales" selection.

== Track listing ==
No.	Title	Length
1.	"Las Copas"	2:34
2.	"Domingo de Ramos"	2:33
3.	"Prisión de Carne"	7:27
4.	"Tumba"	4:46
5.	"Haz de Mí"	4:27
6.	"Ángel"	4:50
7.	"Liebre"	7:10
8.	"Pecado"	6:52
9.	"Tierra Maldita"	6:50
10.	"Deseo, Carne y Voluntad"	1:34
11.	"Fracaso"	6:15
12.	"3 Flores Blancas"	4:00
13.	"Cáliz"	9:35
14.	"José (créditos)"	4:55
Total length:		73:48

== Personnel ==
Credits adapted from Discogs and Bandcamp.

Candelabro

- Matías Ávila – vocals, guitar, songwriting, lyrics, production
- Javiera Donoso – vocals, synthesizer, cover artwork
- Carlos Muñoz – bass, piano
- Franco Arriagada – drums, co-production
- Nahuel Alavia – saxophone, synthesizer
- Luis Ayala – lead guitar
- María Lobos – alto saxophone

Production

- Juan Diego Soto – production, co-production, mixing, recording
- Chalo González – mastering
- Carlos Doerr, Emanuel Irarrázabal – recording
- Catalina Salas, Javiera Hernández, Nicolás Moris – recording assistance

Design

- Julián Plaza Pozo – graphic design
- Isidora Blanco – photography

== Accolades ==
Year	Award	Category	Result	Ref.
2025	CityLab Global ("Esenciales")	Best Album of the Year	Won	
2026	Premios Pulsar	Album of the Year	Won	
2026	Premios Pulsar	Best Rock Album	Won	
2026	Santiago Music Video	Best Song ("Prisión de Carne")	Won	
2026	Santiago Music Video	Best Conceptual Work	Won	
2026	Santiago Music Video	Best Screenplay	Won	
