= 2002 Altazor Awards =

3rd Altazor Awards
- Date: March 25, 2002
- Venue: Museo Nacional de Bellas Artes
- Country: Chile

Television/radio coverage
- Network: TVN

The third annual Altazor Awards took place on March 25, 2002, at the Museo Nacional de Bellas Artes.

== Nominations ==
Winners are in bold text.

=== Literary Arts ===
==== Narrative ====
- Carlos Cerda – Escrito con L
- Poli Délano – Rompiendo Las Reglas
- Pedro Lemebel – Tengo miedo, torero
- Carolina Rivas – Dama en el Jardín
- **José Miguel Varas – Cuentos Completos**

==== Poetry ====
- Juan Cameron – Versos atribuidos al joven Francisco María Arouet y otros textos desclasificados
- Tomas Harris – Encuentro con Hombres Oscuros
- Armando Roa Vial – Estancias en Homenaje a Gregorio Samsa
- **Armando Uribe – A peor Vida**

==== Essay ====
- Carla Cordua – Ideas y Ocurrencias
- Carlos Franz – La Muralla enterrada. Santiago Ciudad Imaginaria
- Alfredo Jocelyn-Holt – Holt "Historia General de Chile. Tomo I El Retorno de los Dioses
- **Armando Uribe – Fantasma de la Sinrazón y el secreto de la poesía**

=== Visual Arts ===
==== Painting ====
- **José Balmes – Informe**
- Carlos Maturana (Bororo) – Bororo Sobre Papel
- Ülrich Welss – Ülrich Welss 1970-2001
- Ricardo Yrarrázaval – Paisajes

==== Sculpture ====
- Vicente Gajardo – Cohabitaciones
- Pilar Ovalle – Objetuales
- **Osvaldo Peña – Gestos Patrimoniales**

==== Engraving and Drawing ====
- Jaime Cruz – Grabados de la Década 1991 -2001
- Klaudio Vidal – Por sus Grabados en la Exposición "Intensificar"
- **Ricardo Yrarrázaval – Oleos y Grabados**

==== Installation art and Video art ====
- Claudia Aravena and Guillermo Cifuentes – Lugar Común
- Claudio Correa and Sebastián Preece – Sala de Oficio
- Josefina Fontecilla – Crónicas de la Materia
- **Carlos Leppe – Fatiga de Material**

==== Photography ====
- **Alvaro Larco – La Mirada Transeúnte**
- Miguel Sayago – Pintores Chilenos
- Tito Vásquez – Retrospectiva

=== Performing Arts Theatre ===
==== Dramaturgy ====
- **Jorge Díaz – El Desvarío**
- Benjamín Galemiri – Edipo Asesor
- Elsa Pobrete – Las Morla

==== Director ====
- Mauricio Celedón – Alice Underground
- Alejandro Goic – Nadie es Profeta en su Espejo
- Raúl Osorio – El Círculo de Tiza Caucasiano
- **Andrés Pérez – La Huida**
- Luis Ureta – Edipo Asesor

==== Actor ====
- Luciano Cruz-Coke – Largo viaje del día hacia la noche
- Rodolfo Pulgar – El censor
- **Alejandro Trejo – Nadie es Profeta en su Espejo**
- Tomás Vidiella – Largo viaje del día hacia la noche

==== Actress ====
- Heidrum Breier – Historias de Familia
- **Mabel Farías – El encuentro de Irene**
- María Izquierdo – Los Ojos Rotos
- Gloria Münchmeyer – Largo Viaje del Día hacia la Noche

=== Performing Arts Dance ===
==== Choreography ====
- **Gigi Caciuleanu – Gente**
- Daniela Marini – Alto Contraste
- Esteban Peña – Memoria De Quipu
- Renato Peralta – La Granja de Don Renato

==== Male Dancer ====
- Andrés Maulén – Vértigo
- **César Morales – Sueño de una Noche de Verano**
- Luis Ortigoza – Diana y Acteón
- César Sepúlveda – Gente

==== Female Dancer ====
- Carola Alvear – 20 Poemas y una canción
- Natalia Berríos – Sueño de una Noche de Verano
- Lidia Olmos – Diana y Acteón
- **Vivian Romo – Gente**

=== Musical Arts ===
==== Classical music ====
- Alejandro Guarello – Vikach I
- Cuarteto de Guitarras de Chile – Joaquín Rodrigo. Concierto de Aranjuez, Concierto Madrigal. Concierto Andaluz
- Duet Miguel Villafruela and Rodrigo Kanamori – Secuencias, Saxofones y Percusiones
- **Rodolfo Fischer, Cecilia Frigerio, José Azócar, Sergio Gómez and Carmen Luisa Letelier – National version of Madame Butterfly**

==== Traditional music ====
- **Illapu – El Grito de la Raza**
- Carlos Jarufe – Reina de mi Ciudad
- Los Santiaguinos – Cueca Urbana
- Freddy Torrealba – Claudia

==== Ballad ====
- **Cecilia Echenique – Secreta Intimidad**
- Soledad Guerrero – Yo Soy Sol
- Pablo Herrera – Sentado en la Vereda
- Fernando Ubiergo – Acústico

==== Pop/Rock ====
- González y Los Asistentes – Cerrado con Llave
- Mauricio Redolés – Redolés y Los Ex Animales Domésticos en Shile Vol I.
- **Mamma Soul – Fe**
- Mandrácula – Sexy

==== Alternative/Jazz ====
- Jorge Campos – Machi
- Pedro Greene – Cormorán
- Pancho Molina y los Titulares – Perseguidor
- **Juan Antonio Sánchez – Tonada en Sepia**

==== Playing ====
- Gustavo Bosch (Trumpet)
- Héctor Briceño (Trombone)
- **Jorge Díaz (Guitar)**
- Pedro Greene (Percussion)

=== Media Arts Film ===
==== Dirección ====
- Orlando Lübbert – Taxi para tres
- **Iván Osnovikoff and Bettina Perut – Un Hombre Aparte**
- Luis R. Vera – Bastardos en el Paraíso
- Andrés Wood – La Fiebre del Loco

==== Actor ====
- Luis Dubó – La Fiebre del Loco
- Fernando Gómez-Rovira – Taxi para tres
- Daniel Muñoz – Taxi para tres
- **Alejandro Trejo – Taxi para tres**

==== Actress ====
- Tamara Acosta – La Fiebre del Loco
- María Izquierdo – La Fiebre del Loco
- Loreto Moya – La Fiebre del Loco
- **Amparo Noguera – Un ladrón y su mujer**

==== Creative Contribution ====
- Cecilia Barriga (Mise en scène of Time's Up)
- Miguel Joan Littin (Director of Photography of La Fiebre del Loco)
- Carmen Luz Parot (Historic Register of Estadio Nacional)
- **Bettina Perut and Iván Osnovikoff (Editing of Un hombre Aparte)**

=== Media Arts TV ===
==== Director ====
- **Paola Castillo – Cine Video + Teatro**
- María Eugenia Rencoret – Amores de mercado
- Vicente Sabatini – Pampa Ilusión

==== Screenplay ====
- Víctor Carrasco, Larissa Contreras, María José Galleguillos and Alexis Moreno – Pampa Ilusión
- **Alejandro Cabrera, Arnaldo Madrid, René Arcos and Marcelo Leonart – Amores de mercado**
- Gregorio González, Pablo Perelman, Juan Andrés Condon, Santiago Yazigi, Gastón Roca and Enrique Artigas – Los Patiperros
- Antonio Skármeta, Paola Castillo and Valeria Vargas – El Show de los Libros

==== Actor ====
- Néstor Cantillana – Pampa Ilusión
- Luciano Cruz-Coke – Amores de mercado
- Héctor Noguera – Pampa Ilusión
- Mauricio Pesutic – Amores de mercado
- **Álvaro Rudolphy – Amores de mercado**

==== Actress ====
- Claudia Cabezas – Pampa Ilusión
- Claudia Di Girólamo – Pampa Ilusión
- **Solange Lackington – Piel Canela**
- Patricia López – Amores de mercado

==== Creative Contribution ====
- Daniel Alcaíno and Jorge López (Characters Creation)
- Augusto Góngora and computer maker of Cine Video + Teatro
- **Iván Núñez and computer maker of El Termómetro**
