= Millonarios F.C. =

Association football club in Colombia

Millonarios
- Full name: Azul y Blanco Millonarios Fútbol Club S.A.
- Nicknames: Embajadores (The Ambassadors); El Ballet Azul (The Blue Ballet); Los Azules (The Blues); Los Albiazules (The White-Blues); El famoso Millos (The famous Millos)
- Short name: Millos
- Founded: 29 November 1937; 88 years ago
- Ground: Nemesio Camacho
- Capacity: 39,512
- Owner(s): Amber Capital (85.48%); 4000 minor shareholders (14.52%)
- President: Enrique Camacho Matamoros
- Head coach: Alberto Gamero
- League: Categoría Primera A
- 2025: Primera A, 8th of 20
- Website: millonarios.com.co
| Home colours | Away colours | Third colours |

Millonarios Fútbol Club, known simply as Millonarios, is a Colombian professional football club based in Bogotá, that competes in the Categoría Primera A, top flight of football in Colombia.

It is one of the most successful and iconic clubs in Colombia, making it one of the largest sports entities in the country and one of the most important in South America. The team's origins date back to the 1920s, but it began to be called Los Millonarios in 1937 when its name was Club Deportivo Municipal. It was officially founded on 18 June 1946, as Club Deportivo Los Millonarios, and later as Millonarios Fútbol Club on 20 April 2011, when it was reconstituted as a public limited company. Since 1938, the team has played their home games at Estadio El Campín which currently holds a 36,343 capacity.

Millonarios has participated in the Categoría Primera A since its inception in 1948, being one of only three teams to have participated in all of its tournaments, along with Independiente Santa Fe and Atlético Nacional. Millonarios competes in the Clásico Capitalino against home-town rivals Independiente Santa Fe, Clásico Colombiano with Atlético Nacional and the Clásico Añejo against Deportivo Cali and also has a strong rivalry, under the name of Clásico de las Estrellas with América de Cali.

Millonarios won their first local title in 1949 and shortly afterwards formed a team known as the "Ballet Azul", which was a reference of great importance worldwide during the first part of the 1950s, being considered by various South American and European specialists as the best team in the world when it achieved a large number of triumphs and international achievements of great importance for the time. Alfredo Di Stefano, who is widely regarded as one of the greatest footballers of all time, joined Millonarios in 1949 and played for the team until 1953. During this period, Millonarios won the Copa Colombia in 1951 and the Colombian league championship in 1949, 1951, and 1952. Among its accomplishments, the team won the first edition of the Small World Cup of Clubs in 1953, the Golden Wedding Championship against Real Madrid in 1952, which the team won at the Santiago Bernabéu Stadium, and the Duelo de Campeones Trophies in 1950 and 1951. Their participations at these tournaments gave rise to the team's nickname of "Ambassador" as the club was representing Colombia at these tournaments.

It is the second most successful team in Colombian football with 23 official titles, including national and international championships. The team has won 16 championships in the local Colombian League, 3 Colombian Cup titles, and 2 Colombian Super Cup titles. It also won the Small Club World Cup in 1953, the Copa Simón Bolívar continental championship in 1972 and the last edition of the Copa Merconorte in 2001.

According to the IFFHS, Millonarios is the fourth-best Colombian club of the 20th century and the ninth-best Colombian club of the 21st century. It has been included in lists of the best football clubs of all time made by major international sports media, being the only Colombian team present on them. By CONMEBOL's standards, Millonarios is the third-best Colombian club in international tournaments, with 396.85 points, and ranks 51st in the official ranking of Copa Libertadores clubs. It is recognized by FIFA as one of the Classic Clubs of the World and named by the organization as the First Ambassador of Colombian Football.

== History ==
=== 1937–1946: Origins and incorporation ===
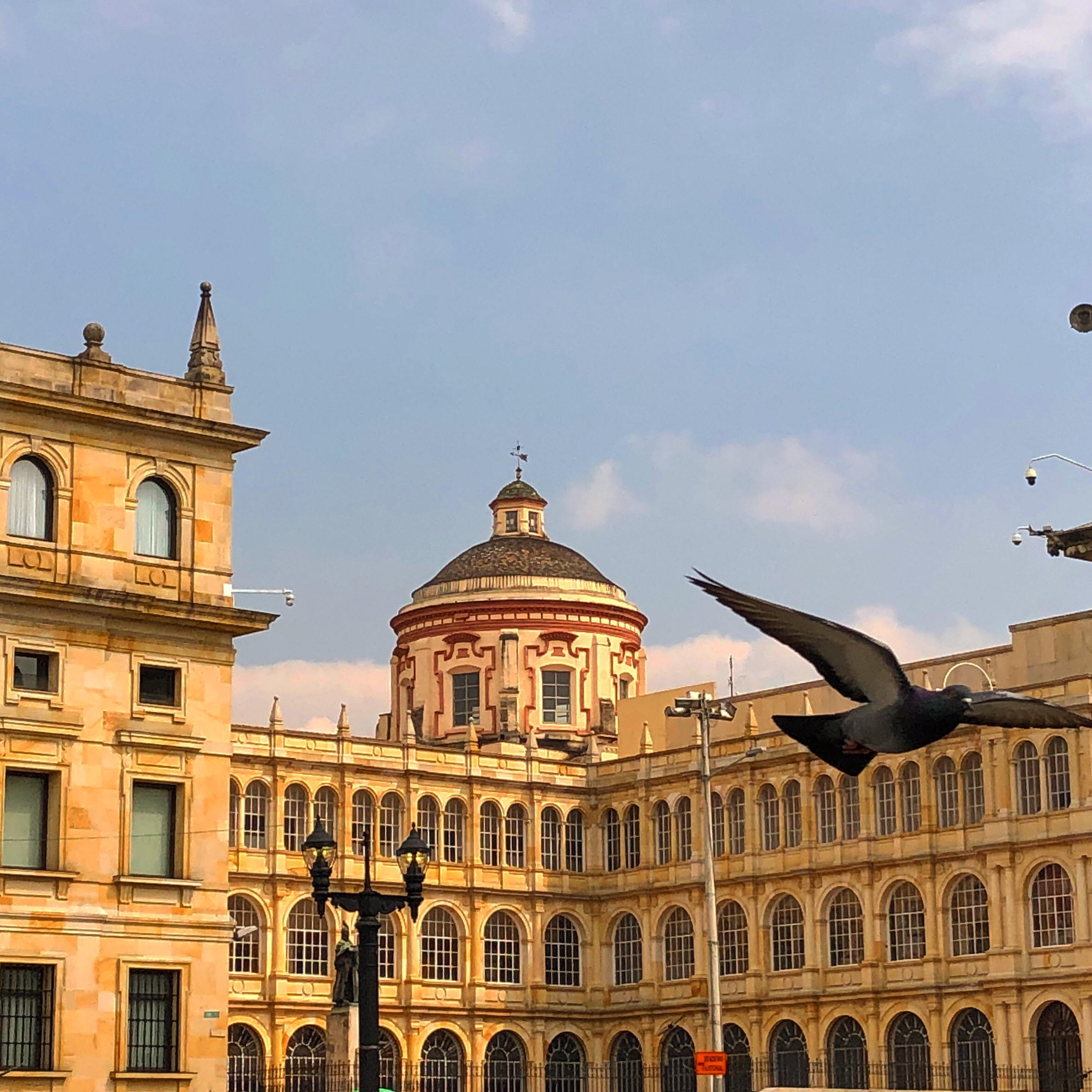
The Colegio Mayor de San Bartolomé in Bogotá, associated with Millonarios' early antecedents and the club's formal incorporation in 1946

Millonarios traces its origins to school teams formed in Bogotá in 1937, but the modern club was formally incorporated as Club Deportivo Los Millonarios on June 18, 1946. The distinction is material: the 1937–39 teams were predecessors that changed names and organizational arrangements, whereas the 1946 act created the legal entity subsequently recognized by the club and Colombian football institutions.

The early team was formed by pupils from the Colegio Mayor de San Bartolomé and the La Salle Institute, who sought matches against sides from other districts of Bogotá. It was initially known by the alternative names Unión Juventud and Unión Bogotá, before adopting the composite name Juventud Bogotana. The side subsequently became associated with Bogotá's municipal sporting structure and was known at different times as Deportivo Municipal and Deportivo Independiente. These changes reflected its shifting relationship with municipal support rather than a single uninterrupted club name or legal organization.

In 1940, the team competed in the Bogotá Sports Association's second-division championship, won promotion, and then participated in the top category of the Cundinamarca amateur league. The club's historical record credits it with local championships in 1941, 1943, 1944 and 1945. These amateur competitions predated the national professional championship, which began in 1948.

==== Adoption of the Millonarios name ====
The name Millonarios originated as a press nickname linked to the team’s expenditure on Argentine players, not as an official name adopted without interruption in 1939. After municipal support ended, the team continued to employ foreign players. According to Señal Memoria, El Tiempo sports editor Luis Camacho Montoya referred to it disparagingly as “los millonarios”, and the term gained currency among the press and supporters.

The nickname was associated in retrospective accounts with negotiations over player payments involving Argentine forward Vicente Lucífero. These accounts state that the team sought to retain its Argentine players and bring Colombian players’ pay closer to their wages, prompting Camacho Montoya’s criticism.

The team used the name Los Millonarios in 1939, but the name became official when Club Deportivo Los Millonarios was legally incorporated on June 18, 1946. Alfonso Senior Quevedo was elected the club’s first president. This incorporation occurred during the organization of professional football in Colombia: Millonarios and Santa Fe were among the Bogotá clubs founded or formally established in 1946–47, and Senior subsequently helped promote the national professional championship.

=== 1949–54: The Ballet Azul ===
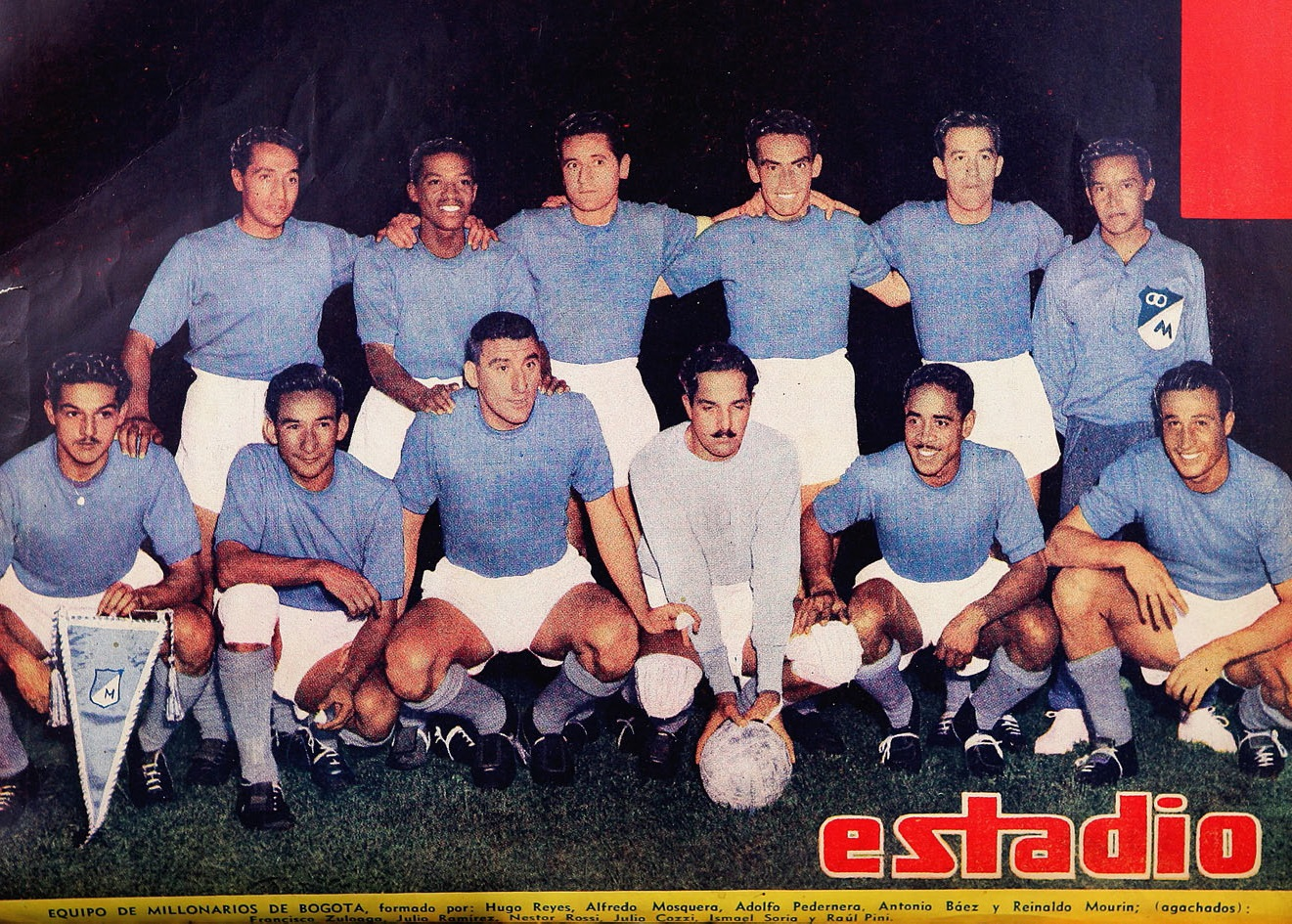
Millonarios in 1952, during the Ballet Azul period

The Ballet Azul (Blue Ballet) was the team through which Millonarios dominated the early years of Colombian professional football and acquired an international reputation. Its emergence depended on the exceptional conditions of El Dorado, when Colombian clubs recruited prominent foreign players outside the international transfer system, but its success also reflected Millonarios' concentration of several leading Argentine players in one squad.

The conditions that produced the team followed an institutional dispute within Colombian football and labour unrest in Argentina. The newly established Categoría Primera A was administered by DIMAYOR, which separated from the FIFA-recognized Colombian federation in 1949. Because the breakaway league was no longer observing international transfer agreements, its clubs could offer salaries to foreign players without negotiating releases from their existing teams. A players' strike in the Argentine Primera División, which began in October 1948 and ended in April 1949, contributed to the movement of Argentine footballers abroad, although Millonarios' principal recruitment occurred after the strike had ended.

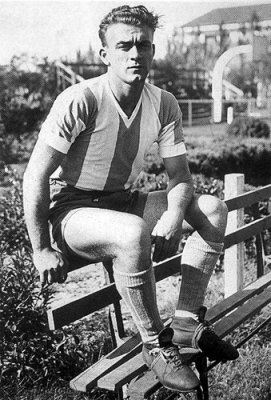
Alfredo Di Stéfano, who played for Millonarios from 1949 to 1953

Club president Alfonso Senior and player-manager Carlos Aldabe recruited Adolfo Pedernera in June 1949. Pedernera, who had been the creative centre of River Plate's La Máquina, became the organizer of the new Millonarios side and encouraged other Argentines to join him. Alfredo Di Stéfano and Néstor Rossi arrived in August, joining a squad that also included Argentine goalkeeper Julio Cozzi and established Colombian players. Retrospective accounts identify Pedernera, Di Stéfano and Rossi as the central figures of the Ballet Azul, with the nickname referring collectively to the team assembled around them rather than to every Millonarios side of the El Dorado period.

The strengthened squad produced Millonarios' first league championship in 1949. After finishing level on points with Deportivo Cali, Millonarios won both matches of the championship play-off. The club subsequently won three consecutive league titles from 1951 through 1953, giving it four championships in five seasons. It also won the Copa Colombia competition completed in 1953, while Pedernera combined his playing duties with a growing coaching role and guided the club to the final league title of the sequence.

==== International invitations and the Small Club World Cup ====
The Small Club World Cup was an invitational tournament held in Caracas, Venezuela, from 1952. It brought together invited South American and European clubs, generally in a double round-robin format; it was not equivalent to the later Intercontinental Cup or FIFA Club World Cup.

Millonarios participated in the 1952 edition alongside Real Madrid, Botafogo and Venezuelan club La Salle FC. It drew both matches with Real Madrid, 1–1, drew Botafogo 4–4 and lost the return match 2–0, and defeated La Salle 4–1 and 5–1. Millonarios finished third with seven points from six matches; Real Madrid and Botafogo each finished on eight points, with Real Madrid declared champion on goal average.

In the first 1953 edition, Millonarios won the tournament unbeaten. It finished first with five points from three matches under the two-points-for-a-win system, ahead of River Plate, Rapid Wien and Espanyol. Millonarios defeated River Plate 5–1 and drew the return match 1–1, then defeated Rapid Wien 2–1 and 4–0 and Espanyol 6–0 and 4–0. Millonarios' reputation extended beyond its domestic titles. In March 1952, the club travelled to Spain for the tournament marking Real Madrid's 50th anniversary and defeated Real Madrid 4–2. The result became the most frequently cited match of the Ballet Azul period and formed part of the first European tour undertaken by a Colombian club. Later Colombian accounts consequently described the side as the best team in the world, but this was an honorific contemporary and retrospective characterization.

==== Dissolution of the Ballet Azul ====
The institutional conditions supporting the team were temporary. FIFA barred Colombian clubs and national teams from international competition because of DIMAYOR's unauthorized recruitment, prompting the agreement known as the Pact of Lima in October 1951. The settlement brought the Colombian league back within the international system and allowed the affected foreign players to remain temporarily, but required them to return to their recognized clubs by October 1954. Di Stéfano left Millonarios after the 1952 season and joined Real Madrid in 1953, where he became a central figure in the club's subsequent European success. The departure of Di Stéfano and the approaching 1954 deadline progressively dismantled the Argentine core, ending the Ballet Azul as a distinct team even though Millonarios remained competitive domestically.

=== 1954–64: Reconstruction and domestic renewal ===
The post-Ballet Azul era was not a simple decline after the departure of foreign stars, but a reconstruction that replaced Millonarios' El Dorado model with a domestically sustainable championship team. The deadline established by the Pact of Lima required the return of foreign players recruited outside the international transfer system by October 1954, ending the exceptional conditions that had allowed Millonarios to assemble its Argentine-led side. Alfredo Di Stéfano had already departed for Real Madrid in 1953, and the subsequent dispersal of the club's foreign core reduced Millonarios' competitive advantage.

The first years after El Dorado were uneven. Millonarios finished second in 1956, behind Deportes Quindío, but fell to 12th and last in the 1957 championship; its record of four wins, eight draws and 10 defeats left it with 16 points from 22 matches. In 1958, the club recovered to second place, finishing one point behind Bogotá rival Santa Fe. This reversal coincided with the appointment of former Millonarios goalkeeper Gabriel Ochoa Uribe as manager after his retirement as a player.

Ochoa's first spell established the framework for the club's second great title cycle. Millonarios won the 1959 league championship with 58 points from 44 matches, six more than runner-up Independiente Medellín, after recording 22 victories, 14 draws and eight defeats. The title was the club's fifth, its first since 1953 and Ochoa's first as manager.

After Santa Fe won the 1960 championship, Millonarios began a sequence of four consecutive league titles from 1961 to 1964. The 1961 title was won ahead of Independiente Medellín, while Millonarios finished ahead of Deportivo Cali in 1962 and Santa Fe in 1963. The run made Millonarios the first club to win four successive Colombian league titles, surpassing its own three-title sequence of 1951–53. Millonarios also won the Copa Colombia in 1963; the competition's regulations awarded permanent possession of the trophy to the club after it won three consecutive editions from 1951–52 through 1962–63.

Ochoa's team combined players who had remained from earlier Millonarios sides with a new generation of Colombian footballers. Goalkeeper Senén Mosquera, defender Efraín Sánchez, midfielders Delio Gamboa and Marino Klinger, and forwards Hugo Contreras and César Morales were among the players associated with the 1959–64 title cycle. Ochoa's influence extended beyond the championships: his first spell at Millonarios ran from 1958 to 1964, and his later spells brought further league success in 1972.

The club's 1961–64 sequence nevertheless marked the end of an identifiable cycle rather than the beginning of uninterrupted supremacy. Millonarios did not retain the championship after 1964, and Deportivo Cali won the 1965 title. The post-Ballet Azul reconstruction had nevertheless produced five league championships between 1959 and 1964, demonstrating that Millonarios' later success did not depend exclusively on the temporary foreign-player market of El Dorado.

=== 1960–1978: Sustained contention ===
The 1960s and 1970s extended Millonarios' domestic standing beyond the post-El Dorado recovery, but the two decades were marked by different competitive cycles. The club completed its four consecutive league championships in 1964, then spent much of the late 1960s rebuilding before Gabriel Ochoa Uribe returned to lead a further title-winning side in 1972.

Millonarios' 1964 championship was its ninth overall and fourth in succession after the titles of 1961, 1962 and 1963. The achievement remains the club's longest consecutive championship sequence. Its managerial continuity was more limited than the four-title run suggests: Gabriel Ochoa Uribe led the 1959, 1961, 1962 and 1963 championship teams, while the 1964 title was won after changes in the technical staff during the season.

The club did not win another league title during the remainder of the 1960s. It finished runner-up behind Deportivo Cali in 1967 and third in 1968, while the latter season included victory in the Finalización tournament but not the annual championship. Millonarios again finished third in the 1969 championship. The period nevertheless included the arrival of Argentine goalkeeper Amadeo Carrizo, who joined the club in 1969 after an earlier career with River Plate and the Argentina national team.

Ochoa returned as manager for 1972 and led Millonarios to its tenth league championship. The Colombian championship used an Apertura, Finalización and final-triangular format that year. Millonarios won the Apertura, Deportivo Cali won the Finalización, and Millonarios finished first in the final triangular against Cali and Junior, taking five points—one more than Cali—to secure the title. The team was associated in Colombian football coverage with the attacking trio of Alejandro Brand, Willington Ortiz and Jaime Morón, commonly called the “BOM” from their surnames' initials.

The 1972 championship did not produce an immediate repeat. Millonarios finished runner-up in 1973 and 1975, and third in 1974, 1976 and 1977. The club returned to the title in 1978, winning its 11th Colombian championship. The title was its last before the 1987–88 consecutive championships and concluded a decade in which Millonarios remained a frequent contender without sustaining another extended run of titles.

=== 1980s: Consecutive championships and ownership controversy ===
Millonarios returned to the summit of Colombian football in the late 1980s, winning consecutive league championships in 1987 and 1988 after a nine-year titleless period. The sporting recovery, however, coincided with the influence of drug trafficker Gonzalo Rodríguez Gacha in the club, placing the two titles within the wider history of narcotrafficking's effect on Colombian football.

The club had won its 11th league championship in 1978 but did not challenge consistently for the title during the early 1980s. Rodríguez Gacha acquired a stake in Millonarios during the decade, after the club had accumulated debts. Colombian reporting has documented his financial influence over the institution and has linked it to a broader period in which drug-trafficking money entered professional football in the country. The Colombian state later obtained, through asset forfeiture, a 29.15-percent Millonarios shareholding previously associated with Rodríguez Gacha's family.

Under manager Luis Augusto García, Millonarios won the 1987 championship, its first league title since 1978 and 12th overall. The title was confirmed on December 20, 1987, at the conclusion of the final octagonal stage. The squad included goalkeeper Rubén Cousillas, defenders Wilman Conde and Eduardo Pimentel, midfielders Miguel Augusto Prince and Gabriel Jaime Gómez, and forwards Arnoldo Iguarán, Mario Vanemerak, Carlos Estrada and Óscar Juárez. García, who had previously managed Deportes Quindío, returned to the club that had formed him as a player and coached Millonarios to both late-1980s championships.

Millonarios retained the title in 1988, finishing ahead of Atlético Nacional in the final octagonal. The club secured its 13th championship on goal difference after finishing level on points with Nacional; it had also recorded a 26-match unbeaten run during the season. The core of the 1987 side remained, with Iguarán, Estrada, Vanemerak, Prince and Rubén Darío Hernández among the principal returning players; Alberto Gamero was also a member of the championship squad.

The period has subsequently generated debate over how the titles should be understood. In 2012, then club president Felipe Gaitán said the board would consider returning the 1987 and 1988 titles because of their association with Rodríguez Gacha, but stressed that no formal decision had been made. Former players from the championship teams opposed the proposal and maintained that their sporting achievements should not be invalidated. Neither DIMAYOR nor any other Colombian football authority has revoked the titles; they remain in Millonarios' official league total.

The 1988 championship became the club's last league title for 24 years. Millonarios would not again win the Colombian championship until the 2012 Finalización, although it remained one of the country's major clubs during the intervening period.

=== 1990s: Near misses and the unbeaten run ===
The 1990s extended Millonarios' league-title drought after 1988, but the club remained competitive in several championship cycles. Its two runner-up finishes—in 1994 and 1995–96—were shaped by the Colombian league's bonus-point system, while its 1999 campaign produced an unbeaten run that became a domestic record without resulting in a title.

Millonarios entered the 1994 championship under manager Miguel Augusto Prince, a former player who had developed a younger squad within the club's youth structure. The competition awarded bonus points to the leading teams before its final stage. Millonarios accumulated 1.50 bonus points, while Atlético Nacional entered with 2.00; Nacional ultimately won the championship after both clubs won their final matches, leaving Millonarios second. The result was Millonarios' first league runner-up finish since 1984.

The club again finished runner-up in the 1995–96 championship, which used the same basic mechanism of carrying bonus points into its final group. Millonarios won four of its six final-stage matches and finished with 12 points from that phase; Deportivo Cali also finished on 12 points but was awarded the championship because its three bonus points gave it a superior overall total. The result gave Millonarios a second consecutive league runner-up finish but did not end the title drought.

In the 1999 season, Millonarios produced its principal sporting achievement of the decade. Its 29-match unbeaten league run began in May, continued through the Finalización regular phase and ended in November during the semi-final groups. The sequence surpassed the club's previous 26-match unbeaten run from 1988 and remains recognized in Millonarios coverage as the longest such league run in Colombian professional football.

Millonarios did not convert the run into a place in the final. It finished outside the top ten during the Apertura, then collected 42 points in the Finalización regular phase before falling short in the semi-final group stage. Atlético Nacional subsequently won the championship. The decade therefore ended with a record and repeated late-stage participation, but without a major trophy.

=== 2000s: Continental success and domestic instability ===
Millonarios entered the 2000s without a domestic league title since 1988, but began the decade by winning the club's first official trophy in a CONMEBOL competition. The 2001 Copa Merconorte success gave Millonarios an international title during an otherwise uneven period in which changes of manager and inconsistent league results limited sustained recovery.

Millonarios reached the Copa Merconorte final for the second consecutive year in 2001. Coached by Luis Augusto García, the team eliminated Mexican club Necaxa in the semi-finals and met Ecuador's Emelec in the final. Both final legs ended 1–1. In the return match in Guayaquil, goalkeeper Rafael Dudamel saved two penalties and Emelec missed another as Millonarios won the shoot-out 3–1 on December 20, 2001. The competition was discontinued after that edition, making Millonarios its final champion.

The achievement did not immediately restore domestic competitiveness. Millonarios reached the Copa Merconorte final in 2000 but lost to Atlético Nacional, then recorded no league championship or domestic cup title in the remainder of the decade. The club's financial position also deteriorated during the period. In 2003, Colombia's Dirección Nacional de Estupefacientes prepared to sell a 29.15-percent Millonarios shareholding that had been forfeited from the family of Gonzalo Rodríguez Gacha, illustrating the continuing consequences of the club's 1980s ownership history.

The appointment of Juan Carlos Osorio in 2006 produced a brief improvement. Millonarios reached the Finalización semi-final groups in his first season and finished fifth in the aggregate table, returning the club to the Copa Sudamericana. Osorio resigned in July 2007 to join Chicago Fire FC.

His successor, Mario Vanemerak, led Millonarios to the semi-finals of the 2007 Copa Sudamericana. The team eliminated Atlético Nacional, Colo-Colo and São Paulo before losing to Club América of Mexico in the semi-finals. It was Millonarios' first Copa Sudamericana semi-final and its best continental performance since the Merconorte title.

The continental run was not matched in the league. Millonarios missed the Finalización play-offs in 2007, then failed to qualify for the play-offs in the 2008 Finalización and both tournaments in 2009 and 2010. The club finished 15th in the 2009 Apertura, and Vanemerak, followed by Óscar Quintabani, did not reverse the broader decline.

=== 2010s: Return to domestic honours ===
Millonarios' return to honours in the 2010s followed a period of financial restructuring as well as an improvement in results. After the club had gone without a major trophy since the 2001 Copa Merconorte and without a league championship since 1988, it entered a corporate reorganization process in 2011. The restructuring led to the creation of Azul & Blanco S.A., which acquired the club and replaced its previous membership-based legal structure with a public limited company.

Richard Páez became manager in January 2011. Millonarios reached the semi-final group stage in both league tournaments: it finished sixth in the Apertura's regular phase and fourth in the Finalización's regular phase. In the latter competition, it led Junior 3–0 after the first leg of the semi-final group tie before losing the return leg 3–0 and the ensuing penalty shoot-out.

The more consequential result came in the 2011 Copa Colombia. Millonarios defeated Boyacá Chicó 1–0 in each final leg, for a 2–0 aggregate victory and the club's second Copa Colombia title. The trophy ended a 10-year wait for any title and qualified Millonarios for the 2012 Copa Sudamericana.

Hernán Torres replaced Páez in June 2012. Millonarios reached the semi-finals of the 2012 Copa Sudamericana, eliminating Palmeiras and Grêmio after losing the first legs of both ties, before Tigre eliminated it on away goals. It was Millonarios' first appearance in the semi-finals of the tournament and its best continental campaign since the 2001 Copa Merconorte.

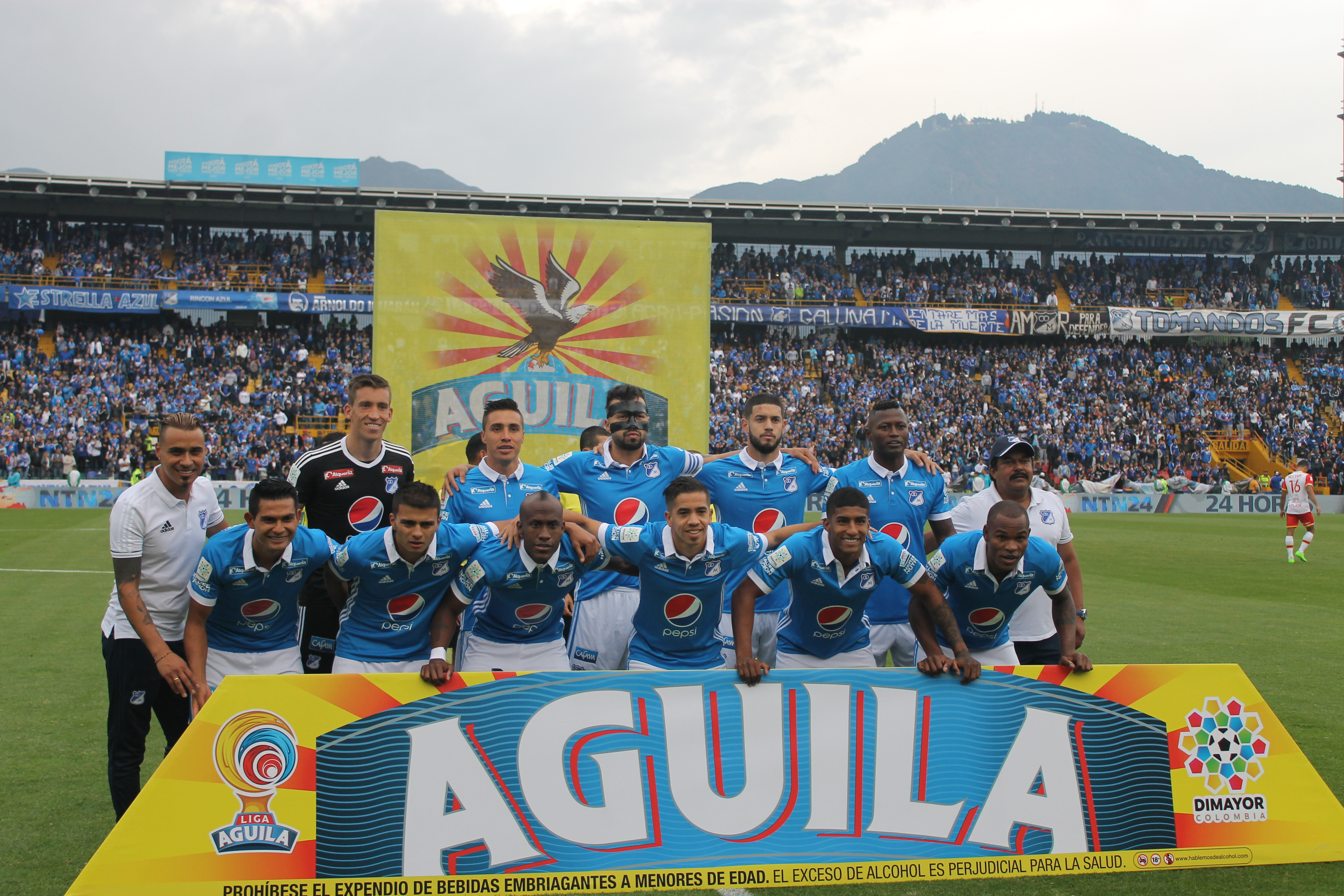
Millonarios before the first leg of the 2017 Finalización final against Independiente Santa Fe

The club's principal success under Torres was the 2012 Finalización title. Millonarios advanced from its semi-final group after finishing level on points with Deportivo Pasto; it reached the final on goal difference. The final against Independiente Medellín ended 0–0 away and 1–1 at home. Millonarios won the penalty shoot-out 5–4 on December 16, securing its 14th league title and ending a 24-year wait for the Colombian championship.

Millonarios entered the 2013 Copa Libertadores as Colombian champion but finished bottom of its group, with one win and five defeats. The club next won the league in the 2017 Finalización under Miguel Ángel Russo. After a 0–0 first leg, Millonarios drew the return match 2–2 with Bogotá rival Santa Fe to win the final 3–2 on aggregate and claim its 15th championship. Russo's team added the 2018 Superliga Colombiana, defeating Atlético Nacional 3–2 on aggregate for Millonarios' first Superliga title.

=== 2020–2024: Alberto Gamero's first tenure ===
Alberto Gamero's first tenure at Millonarios restored recurring title contention after the club's 2017 championship, though its first season produced no trophy. Gamero succeeded Jorge Luis Pinto for the 2020 season after Millonarios had led the 2019 Apertura regular phase but failed to reach either final series. Millonarios failed to reach the 2020 league's knockout phase and lost to Deportivo Cali in the play-off for a place in the 2021 Copa Sudamericana.

Millonarios reached the 2021 Apertura final, where Deportes Tolima won the championship, and then finished second in its Finalización semi-final group behind Tolima. Gamero's first trophy came in the 2022 Copa Colombia. Junior won the first leg of the final 1–0, but Millonarios won the return match 2–0 to take the trophy 2–1 on aggregate.

Millonarios won its 16th league title in the 2023 Apertura. It finished second in the regular phase with 38 points from 20 matches, won its semi-final group, and drew both final legs against Atlético Nacional—0–0 in Medellín and 1–1 in Bogotá—before winning the penalty shoot-out 3–2. The club then won the 2024 Superliga against Junior by a 2–1 aggregate score.

Gamero resigned on December 31, 2024, after five years in charge. His first tenure comprised 277 matches, 128 victories, 82 draws and 67 defeats, and yielded the 2022 Copa Colombia, the 2023 Apertura and the 2024 Superliga.

== Rivalries ==
Millonarios has forged many rivalries with several teams from the league, most notably with local rivals Independiente Santa Fe. This derby is popularly called El Clásico Capitalino (The Capital Classic). It is the only local derby that has been played every season since the beginning of Colombian professional football in 1948. On 16 September 2007, Millonarios completed 100 victories in their Bogotá derby clashes against Santa Fe in the 248th derby match, which ended in a 1–0 victory. The goal was scored by Gerardo Bedoya. Currently, the number of wins for Millonarios is 125 against 90 for Santa Fe.

From March 2015 to March 2017, Millonarios maintained a nine-match unbeaten streak without losing to Santa Fe, with three draws and six victories. The most outstanding was in the 2015 Torneo Apertura, when Millonarios eliminated Santa Fe from the playoffs on the last matchday with a score of 3–1. The goals were converted by Román Torres, Fernando Uribe and Rafael Robayo.

On 19 March 2017, Millonarios cut an undefeated 22 match run by Santa Fe. Millonarios won 3–0 with goals by Andrés Cadavid, Ayron del Valle and Deiver Machado. On 13 December of the same year, the Embajador team and the Cardenal met in the final of the 2017 Finalización. In the first leg, where Millonarios were the home team, they won after a header from Matías de los Santos. In the second leg, played on 17 December, Millonarios came back from an adverse result twice, first with a goal by Andrés Cadavid, and finally with one by Henry Rojas, for a 3–2 aggregate score, with which they won their 15th league championship.

Millonarios also have strong rivalries with other teams such as Atlético Nacional, América de Cali, and Deportivo Cali. The rivalry with Atlético Nacional is sometimes called the most important match in Colombian football, given that both clubs are the most winning ones in the country.

== Honours ==
Millonarios FC honours
| Type | Competition | Titles | Seasons |
|---|---|---|---|
| Domestic | Categoría Primera A | 16 | 1949, 1951, 1952, 1953, 1959, 1961, 1962, 1963, 1964, 1972, 1978, 1987, 1988, 2012–II, 2017–II, 2023–I |
| Domestic | Copa Colombia (Note: Although Millonarios counts the Copa Colombia 1963 as an official title, this edition is not recognized as such by DIMAYOR.) | 3 | 1952–53, 2011, 2022 |
| Domestic | Superliga Colombiana | 2 | 2018, 2024 |
| Continental | Copa Merconorte | 1 | 2001 |
| Continental | Copa Simón Bolívar | 1^{s} | 1972 |
| Regional | Liga de fútbol de Cundinamarca | 7 | 1941, 1943, 1944, 1945, 1946, 1947, 1948 |
| Regional | Asociación deportiva de Bogotá | 1 | 1940 |
| Regional | Campeonato interdepartamental de Colombia | 1 | 1947 |
| Worldwide | Small Club World Cup (Note: Millonarios and some clubs count the Small Club World Cup in their own records, however, without being official by any continental or world entity) | 1 | 1953¹ |

- record
- ^{s} shared record

=== Runner-up finishes ===
- Categoría Primera A
  - Runners-up (10): 1950, 1956, 1958, 1967, 1973, 1975, 1984, 1994, 1995–96, 2021–I
- Copa Colombia
  - Runners-up (2): 2013, 2023
- Superliga Colombiana
  - Runners-up (1): 2013
- Copa Merconorte
  - Runners-up (1): 2000

== Performance in CONMEBOL competitions ==
- Copa Libertadores: 20 appearances

Best: Semi-finals in 1960, 1973 and 1974.

1960: Semi-finals
1962: Quarter-finals
1963: Quarter-finals
1964: Quarter-finals
1968: First Round
1973: Semi-finals
1974: Semi-finals

1976: First Round
1979: First Round
1985: First Round
1988: First Round
1989: Quarter-finals
1995: Quarter-finals
1997: Round of 16

2013: First Round
2017: Second stage
2018: Group stage
2022: Second stage
2023: Third stage
2024: Group stage

- Copa Sudamericana: 8 appearances

2004: Preliminary Round
2007: Semi-finals
2012: Semi-finals

2014: First Round
2018: Round of 16
2020: Second stage

2023: Group stage
2025: First stage

- Copa Merconorte: 4 appearances

1998: Semi-finals
1999: Group Stage
2000: Runner-up
2001: Champion

== Players ==
=== First-team squad ===
As of 10 September 2026

Note: Flags indicate national team as defined under FIFA eligibility rules; some limited exceptions apply. Players may hold more than one non-FIFA nationality.

| No. | Pos. | Nation | Player |
|---|---|---|---|
| 1 | GK | ECU | Javier Burrai (on loan from Sarmiento de Junín) |
| 2 | DF | COL | Carlos Sarabia |
| 3 | DF | COL | Samuel Martín |
| 4 | DF | COL | Jaine Barreiro |
| 5 | DF | COL | Darwin Cortés |
| 6 | DF | COL | Sergio Mosquera |
| 7 | MF | COL | Juan Cuadrado |
| 8 | MF | COL | Dewar Victoria |
| 10 | MF | COL | Daniel Ruiz |
| 11 | FW | COL | Andrey Estupiñán |
| 12 | GK | COL | James Aguirre (on loan from Once Caldas) |
| 13 | MF | COL | Francisco Chaverra (on loan from Independiente Medellín) |
| 14 | MF | COL | David Mackalister Silva (captain) |
| 17 | DF | COL | Jorge Arias |
| 18 | MF | CHI | Rodrigo Ureña |
| 19 | MF | COL | Mateo García |
| 20 | DF | COL | Danovis Banguero |

| No. | Pos. | Nation | Player |
|---|---|---|---|
| 21 | MF | COL | Juan Carlos Pereira |
| 22 | DF | COL | Sebastián Valencia |
| 23 | FW | COL | Leonardo Castro |
| 24 | MF | COL | Julián Angulo (on loan from Independiente Medellín) |
| 25 | MF | COL | Darwin Quintero |
| 26 | DF | COL | Andrés Llinás |
| 27 | FW | ARG | Rodrigo Contreras (on loan from Deportes Antofagasta) |
| 28 | MF | COL | Stiven Vega |
| 29 | DF | COL | Alex Moreno |
| 30 | MF | COL | Sebastián Viveros |
| 32 | FW | ARG | Santiago Giordana |
| 34 | DF | COL | Jhomier Guerrero |
| 35 | FW | COL | Sebastián Mosquera |
| 38 | GK | COL | Jhostin Díaz |
| 43 | DF | COL | Cristian Uparela |
| 55 | MF | BRA | Leonai |

=== Out on loan ===
Note: Flags indicate national team as defined under FIFA eligibility rules; some limited exceptions apply. Players may hold more than one non-FIFA nationality.

| No. | Pos. | Nation | Player |
|---|---|---|---|
| — | DF | COL | Jhoan Hernández (at Botafogo until 31 December 2026) |
| — | MF | COL | Brayan Campaz (at Orsomarso until 30 June 2027) |
| — | MF | COL | Juan José Ramírez (at Llaneros until 31 December 2026) |

| No. | Pos. | Nation | Player |
|---|---|---|---|
| — | FW | COL | Jhon Largacha (at Deportivo Pereira until 31 December 2026) |
| — | FW | COL | Luis Marimón (at Llaneros until 31 December 2026) |

=== World Cup players ===
The following players were chosen to represent their country at the FIFA World Cup while contracted to Millonarios.

- (Colombia) Delio Gamboa (1962)
- (Colombia) Marino Klinger (1962)
- (Argentina) José Van Tuyne (1982)
- (Argentina) Marcelo Trobbiani (1986)
- (Argentina) Sergio Goycochea (1990)
- (Colombia) Carlos Estrada (1990)
- (Colombia) Rubén Darío Hernández (1990)
- (Colombia) Arnoldo Iguarán (1990)
- (Colombia) Óscar Cortés (1994)
- (Colombia) Wilmer Cabrera (1998)
- (Costa Rica) Juan Pablo Vargas (2022)

=== Former players ===
- (Colombia) Tommy Mosquera
- (Argentina) Sergio Goycochea

=== Records ===
==== Most capped players ====
Source: BDFA

| R | Player | P | Career | App. |
|---|---|---|---|---|
| 1 | (Colombia) Bonner Mosquera | MF | 1990–2001, 2002–2006 | 550 |
| 2 | (Colombia) Alejandro Brand | FW | 1969–1978, 1981–1982 | 385 |
| 3 | (Colombia) Julio Edgar Gaviria | DF | 1968–1977 | 382 |
| 4 | (Colombia) Euclides "Tizon" González | DF | 1971–1981 | 371 |
| 5 | (Colombia) Rafael Robayo | MF | 2005–2011, 2012–2016 | 360 |
| 6 | (Colombia) Arnoldo Iguarán | FW | 1983–1991, 1993–1995 | 336 |
| 7 | (Colombia) Alonso "Pocillo" Lopez | DF | 1974–1980, 1982–1985 | 335 |
| 8 | (Colombia) Willington Ortiz | FW | 1972–1979 | 328 |
| 9 | (Colombia) Miguel "El Nano" Prince | DF | 1989–1998 | 321 |
| 10 | (Colombia) Arturo Segovia | DF | 1972–1979 | 316 |

Last updated on: 3 October 2018

==== Top scorers ====
Source: BDFA

| R | Player | P | Career | Goals |
|---|---|---|---|---|
| 1 | (Argentina) Alfredo Castillo | FW | 1948–1957 | 131 |
| 2 | (Colombia) Arnoldo Iguarán | FW | 1983–1991, 1993–1995 | 120 |
| 3 | (Colombia) Marino Klinger | FW | 1957–1966 | 99 |
| 4 | (Colombia) Willington Ortiz | FW | 1972–1979 | 96 |
| 5 | (Colombia) Alejandro Brand | FW | 1969–1978, 1981–1982 | 91 |
| 6 | (Argentina) (Colombia) (Spain) Alfredo Di Stéfano | FW | 1949–1953 | 88 |
| 7 | (Argentina) Miguel Ángel Converti | FW | 1975–1977 | 85 |
| 8 | (Argentina) José María Ferrero | FW | 1967–1969 | 85 |
| 9 | (Argentina) Juan José Irigoyen | FW | 1977–1979 | 81 |
| 10 | (Colombia) Jaime Morón | FW | 1971–1974, 1977–1982 | 80 |

Last updated on: 3 October 2018

== Managers ==
- (Chile) Fernando Constancio (1946–47)
- (Uruguay) Héctor Scarone (1947–48)
- (Uruguay) Manuel Olivera (1948)
- (Argentina) Carlos Aldabe (1949–50)
- (Argentina) Adolfo Pedernera (1950–52)
- (Argentina) Néstor Rossi (1952)
- (Argentina) Adolfo Pedernera (1953)
- (Uruguay) Donaldo Ross (1954–55)
- (Spain) Simón Herrería (1956)
- (Paraguay) Delfín Benítez Cáceres (1956–57)
- (Colombia) Gabriel Ochoa Uribe (1957–60)
- (Argentina) Julio Cozzi (1960–61)
- (Colombia) Gabriel Ochoa Uribe (1961–64)
- (Brazil) Joao Avelino (1964)
- (Colombia) Efraín Sánchez (1964)
- (Colombia) Óscar Ramos (1965)
- (Brazil) José Carlos Bauer (1965)
- (Argentina) Roberto Saba (1966)
- (Colombia) Óscar Ramos (1966)
- (Argentina) Néstor Rossi (1967)
- (Colombia) Francisco Zuluaga (1968)
- (Brazil) Otto Vieira (1969–70)
- (Argentina) Francisco Villegas (1970)
- (Colombia) Jaime Arroyave (1970)
- (Colombia) Gabriel Ochoa Uribe (1970–75)
- (Colombia) Humberto Ortiz (1976)
- (Argentina) Rubén Sole (1976)
- (Argentina) Juan Eulogio Urriolaveitia (1976)
- (Colombia) Gabriel Ochoa Uribe (1977)
- (Argentina) Jorge Solari (1977)
- (Argentina) Rubén Sole (1977)
- (Colombia) Jaime Arroyave (1978)
- (Argentina) Osvaldo Panzutto (1978)
- (Colombia) Jaime Arroyave (1978)
- (Argentina) Pedro Dellacha (1978)
- (Argentina) Juan Hohberg (1979)
- (Colombia) Óscar Ramos (1979)
- (Argentina) José Varacka (1979)
- (Brazil) José Teixeira (1980–81)
- (Colombia) Luis Augusto García (1981)
- (Socialist Federal Republic of Yugoslavia) Todor Veselinović (1982)
- (Argentina) José Pastoriza (1982)
- (Uruguay) Juan Mujica (1983)
- (Colombia) Jorge Luis Pinto (1984–85)
- (Argentina) Eduardo Luján Manera (1985)
- (Colombia) Eduardo Retat (1986)
- (Colombia) Luis Augusto García (1987–90)
- (Colombia) Eduardo Retat (1991)
- (Colombia) Moisés Pachón (1992)
- (Colombia) Miguel Prince (10 October 1992 – 31 December 1993)
- (Federal Republic of Yugoslavia) Vladimir Popović (1994–95)
- (Colombia) Miguel Prince (1995–96)
- (Colombia) Otoniel Quintana (1997)
- (Uruguay) Angel Castelnoble (1997)
- (Colombia) Diego Umaña (1997)
- (Colombia) Francisco Maturana (1998)
- (Colombia) Jorge Luis Pinto (1998–99)
- (Colombia) Luis Augusto García (1999)
- (Colombia) Jaime Rodríguez (2000)
- (Colombia) Diego Umaña (2000–01)
- (Colombia) Luis Augusto García (2001–02)
- (Serbia and Montenegro) Petar Kosanović (2002)
- (Colombia) Cheche Hernández (2002)
- (Colombia) Cerveleón Cuesta (2002)
- (Colombia) Norberto Peluffo (2003–04)
- (Colombia) Óscar Fernando Cortes (2004)
- (Serbia and Montenegro) Dragan Miranović (2004–05)
- (Colombia) Fernando Castro (2005)
- (Colombia) Miguel Prince (30 November 2005 – 30 June 2006)
- (Colombia) Juan Carlos Osorio (1 January 2006 – 30 June 2007)
- (Uruguay) Martín Lasarte (1 July 2007 – 1 September 2007)
- (Argentina) Mario Vanemerak (4 September 2007 – 11 April 2008)
- (Argentina) (Colombia) Óscar Héctor Quintabani (2008–09)
- (Colombia) Luis Augusto García (7 May 2009 – 25 March 2010)
- (Venezuela) Richard Páez (1 June 2010 – 30 June 2012)
- (Colombia) Hernán Torres (1 July 2012 – 3 December 2013)
- (Spain) Juan Manuel Lillo (4 December 2013 – 31 August 2014)
- (Argentina) Ricardo Lunari (8 September 2014 – 25 August 2015)
- (Uruguay) Rubén Israel (27 August 2015 – 11 August 2016)
- (Argentina) Diego Cocca (17 August 2016 – 21 December 2016)
- (Argentina) Miguel Angel Russo (22 December 2016 – 11 November 2018)
- (Colombia) Jorge Luis Pinto (13 November 2018 – 30 October 2019)
- (Colombia) Alberto Gamero (10 December 2019 – 31 December 2024)
- (Colombia) David González (4 January 2025 – 20 August 2025)
- (Colombia) Hernán Torres (22 August 2025 – 28 January 2026)
- (Argentina) Fabián Bustos (1 February 2026 – 1 September 2026)
- (Colombia) Alberto Gamero (3 September 2026 – Present)

Source: Worldfootball.net

== Affiliated teams ==
=== Co-ownership ===
Notes:

- The clubs are owned by Joseph Oughourlian, through its investment groups, as are 'Millionarios' .

| Men | | Women | |
|---|---|---|---|
| (Colombia) Millonarios | (2014 – present) | (Colombia) Millonarios Femenino | (2018 – present) |
| (France) Lens | (2016 – present) | (France) RC Lens Féminin | (2020–present) |
| (Italy) Padova | (2017 – present) | (Italy) Padova Femminile | (2020 – present) |
| (Spain) Real Zaragoza | (2022 – present) | | |

=== Influence in other clubs ===
- Millonario del Rímac: The club was founded in December 1957 after a tour of Millionarios in Inca lands. Currently competes in the third district division of Rímac, (fourth division of Peru) at the hierarchical level. The last official rapprochement between the two institutions occurred in 1976.

=== Brotherhoods ===
- (Argentina) River Plate: In the amateur age of Colombian football, the then known as Club Deportivo Municipal, began to bring Argentine players, so they were nicknamed ("Los Millonarios") as a mockery. Soon after, the directives decided to take that romoquete as part of their official name, which agreed with the beginning of the professional league and the now-called Millonarios continued to contract to a large extent players from River Plate, so the relationship between the clubs became recurrent. Some of the notable player transfers are: Néstor Rossi (from River to Millonarios) and Juan Gilberto Funes (from Millonarios to River).
- (Spain) Real Madrid: The history between the two clubs is reflected in the 7 friendly matches in which they have faced each other since Millonarios has won 3, 3 draws have been presented and only one merengue victory has been seen. Millonarios became recognized as the only foreign club to beat the first golden generation of Real Madrid. In addition, between these two institutions, the transfer of Alfredo Di Stéfano, one of the best players in the history of world football, was presented.
