= Candelabro =

Chilean rock band

- Candelabro in 2026 (from left to right, from top to bottom): David Romero, Carlos Muñoz, Javiera Donoso, Isidora Aldonzo, Franco Arriagada, Nahuel Alavia, Matiás Ávila

Background information
- Origin: Santiago, Santiago Metropolitan Region, Chile
- Years active: 2021–present
- Label: Registro Móvil
- Members: Matías Ávila; Javiera Donoso; Carlos Muñoz; Franco Arriagada; Nahuel Alavia; David Romero; Isidora Aldonza; Luana Campos
- Past members: Luis Ayala; María Lobos

Candelabro is a Chilean art rock band formed in Santiago in 2021. Its current lineup consists of Matías Ávila (vocals, guitar), Javiera Donoso (vocals, keyboards), Franco Arriagada (drums), Carlos Muñoz (bass, piano), Nahuel Alavia (soprano saxophone, keyboards), David Romero (guitar), Isidora Aldonza (oboe) and Launa Campos (piano).

Formed initially as a live entity for frontman Matías Ávila's solo work as Sonora Matías Ávila following the easing of COVID-19 restrictions in Chile, and by 2023 had renamed to Candelabro. Their debut album, Ahora o Nunca (2023), gained them recognition within the Chilean indie scene, and their second studio album, Deseo, carne y voluntad was released in 2025 to critical and commercial acclaim, being awarded the Pulsar Prize for Album of the Year.

The band's sound blends art rock, alternative rock and folk, with progressive rock and post-rock elements on its second album. Ávila has cited the Chilean acts Congreso, Fulano and Los Prisioneros, as well as the international groups Black Country, New Road, Big Thief and Wilco, as influences. Critics have noted the band's use of Catholic imagery and its engagement with spirituality and Chilean society, particularly on Deseo, carne y voluntad.

== History ==
=== 2018–2021: Background and formation ===
In 2021, guitarist Matías Ávila debuted as a solo artist with the albums Heterocromía and El destino de las hormigas. With the idea of presenting these works live, he brought together drummer Franco Arriagada and bassist Carlos Muñoz—with whom he had previously formed a musical group with in 2018—as well as singer Javiera Donoso, guitarist Luis Ayala and saxophonist Nahuel Alavia as a backing band. The band's debut took place that same year at the Centro Cultural Matucana 100, as opening act for the musician Simón Campusano, vocalist of Niños del Cerro. They originally took the name "Sonora Matías Ávila", a reference to the common epithet of large bands in Chilean cumbia.

=== 2022–2024: Ahora o Nunca, debut album ===
After writing songs together, the band adopted the name Candelabro in 2023. According to Ávila, the name originates from a childhood object: a chandelier-shaped lamp at his grandmother's house that he used to speak to while he was alone. That same year they released their first album, Ahora o Nunca, which CityLab Global nominated for "Best Album of the Year" in the alternative music category, and were highlighted by Rolling Stone as one of the most relevant bands of the Chilean independent scene.

In early 2024, after the release of Ahora o Nunca, saxophonist and keyboardist María Lobos joined the group. The following year, they took part in Lollapalooza Chile and Fauna Primavera, in addition to performing in Argentina and Mexico.

=== 2025–present: Deseo, Carne y Voluntad and commercial breakthrough ===
In March 2025, the band announced a crowdfunding campaign to obtain funds for the recording process of their second studio album. They met the campaign goal the following month, and began production of the album shortly after. Deseo, Carne y Voluntad released on October 3 of the same year to critical and commercial acclaim, which was named "Chilean album of the year" by music critic Marcelo Contreras of the newspaper La Tercera. They were also named the "breakthrough band of Chilean rock" by critic Felipe Retamal. The album won the "Best Album of the Year" award given by CityLab Global for its 2025 edition.

In February 2026, the band announced a tour of Spain, with a performance in Barcelona as part of Primavera a la Ciutat 2026, organised by the Primavera Sound festival. On 11 March of that year, the band released cover versions of the Los Prisioneros songs "Ultraderecha" ("Far Right") and "Latinoamérica es un pueblo al sur de Estados Unidos" ("Latin America Is a Town South of the United States"), to coincide with José Antonio Kast taking office as President of Chile. On 14 March, they performed the songs at their Lollapalooza Chile 2026 show, accompanied by images of Kast, Donald Trump, Javier Milei and Benjamin Netanyahu with swastikas on their faces in reference to Nazism, which drew criticism in the media and on social media.

On 13 April, at Citylab GAM, they held the preview screening of the music video for "Prisión de Carne", directed by Germán Pavez, before its official release on 17 April. On 28 April, they received the nomination for Best Rock Album for Deseo, Carne y Voluntad at the Premios Pulsar. In addition, on 27 May they received the nomination for Album of the Year at the same awards, and were then announced as winners in both categories on 7 June.

On 16 June, the band announced through social media the departure of Ayala and Lobos. Four days later, during the La Forma del Ruido music series in Puente Alto, the group presented its new members: guitarist David Romero, of Scott y los Pelmazos, and oboist Isidora Aldonza, of the Foundation of Youth and Children's Orchestras of Chile (FOJI). On 21 August, Candelabro performed for free alongside the groups Dentadura and Cámara Chilena de la Destrucción at the Concierto Mechón of the University of Concepción. During the event they presented pianist Luana Campos, daughter of the musician Jorge Campos of Congreso, as a new member.

In September of that year, they released the music video for the song "Domingo de Ramos" ("Palm Sunday"), directed by Bruno Bello and Isidora Navarrete. They also announced their participation in the festivals Primavera Sound Buenos Aires 2026, Festival Neutral 2026, MUDA 2026 (Festival de la Memoria) and Festival Papayo 2026.

== Musical style and influences ==
Candelabro's music has been described as art rock, alternative rock, experimental rock and indie rock. In 2024, Chilean music critic Loreta Neira described Ahora o Nunca as a mix of Niños del Cerro with "syrupy melodies typical of so-called música cebolla [...] while elements of Latin American fusion music are embellished with pop synthesizers that confirm the importance of Javiera Mena and Álex Anwandter as new artistic reference points". (Note: Original Spanish: "melodías melosas propias de la llamada música cebolla […] mientras que elementos de la música fusión latinoamericana se embellecen con sintetizadores poperos que confirman la importancia de Javiera Mena y Álex Anwandter como nuevos referentes artísticos")

The production of their first album, Ahora o Nunca, was influenced by the American band Wilco, the British band Black Country, New Road, and the Chilean bands Congreso and Niños del Cerro. The band has named Jorge González and Los Prisioneros as references for its work, both for their music and for their political message.

== Members ==
Current members

- Matías Ávila — guitar and vocals
- Javiera Donoso — synthesizer and vocals
- Carlos Muñoz — bass and piano
- Franco Arriagada — drums and percussion
- Nahuel Alavia — soprano saxophone and synthesizer
- David Romero — guitar
- Isidora Aldonza — oboe

Former members

- Luis Ayala — guitar
- María Lobos — saxophone and synthesizer

== Discography ==
=== Studio albums ===
- Ahora o nunca (2023)
- Deseo, carne y voluntad (2025)

== Awards and nominations ==
| Year | Event | Category | Nominated work | Result | Ref. |
|---|---|---|---|---|---|
| 2023 | CityLab | Best Album of the Year: Alternative Music | Ahora o nunca | Nominated | |
| 2025 | CityLab | Best Album of the Year | Deseo, carne y voluntad | Won | |
| 2026 | Pulsar Awards | Best Rock Album | Deseo, carne y voluntad | Nominated | |
| 2026 | Santiago Music Video | Best Song | "Prisión de Carne" | Won | |
| 2026 | Santiago Music Video | Best Conceptual Work | "Prisión de Carne" | Won | |
| 2026 | Santiago Music Video | Best Screenplay | "Prisión de Carne" | Won | |
