= César Morales =

César Morales may refer to:

- César Morales (dancer) (born 1978), ballet dancer from Chile
- César Morales (boxer) (born 1978), Olympic boxer from Mexico
- César Morales (footballer), football player from Mexico
