= Niños del Cerro =

Chilean music group

- Niños del Cerro in October 2023

Background information
- Origin: La Florida, Santiago, Chile
- Genres: Indie rock; indie pop; neo-psychedelia
- Instruments: Bass; drums; guitar; keyboards; vocals
- Years active: 2012–present
- Labels: Fisura; Quemasucabeza; Piloto
- Members: Simón Campusano; Ignacio Castillo; José Mazurett; Felipe Villarubia; Diego Antimán

Niños del Cerro is a Chilean indie rock band formed in La Florida, Santiago, in 2012. It comprises vocalist and guitarist Simón Campusano, guitarist Ignacio Castillo, drummer José Mazurett, bassist Felipe Villarubia, and keyboardist Diego Antimán. One of the most important Latin American indie bands, they are credited for leading the "pop de guitarras" movement, a 2010s Chilean indie scene.

On November 10, 2015, they released their debut studio album Nonato Coo through the independent label Piloto, which earned them critical acclaim and the Pulsar Award for best new artist the same year. On August 31, 2018, they released their second album, Lance, which marked a significant shift into a neo-psychedelic sound, described by Juan Carlos Hidalgo of Revista Marvin as an "Andean Animal Collective".

Following the COVID-19 pandemic, on October 13, 2022, they released their third album, Suave pendiente, which matured on their neo-psychedelic ambitions of the previous project. Their fourth studio album, Alma Tadema, released on October 4, 2025.

== History ==
Simón Campusano formed Niños del Cerro in 2012 alongside Ignacio Castillo and other friends while attending a school near San Ramón in the commune of La Florida, Chile. Of the original members, only Campusano and Castillo remained, with José Mazurett joining on drums and Felipe Villarubia on bass in 2014. During this period, they uploaded their first two songs to SoundCloud—including "La pajarería", which would wound up in their debut album— and, according to Campusano, recorded a couple of extended plays that were ultimately left unreleased.

On November 10, 2015, they released their debut album Nonato Coo through the independent record label Piloto. Piloto was tied to several similar acts in southeastern Santiago, including Patio Solar, El Cómodo Silencio de los que Hablan Poco, Paracaidistas, Las Olas, and Amarga Marga. This wave of indie bands was nicknamed by the press as "pop de guitarras", jangle pop-influenced indie bands with lo-fi production and introspective lyrics. They were nominated alongside other groups from the scene on April 11, 2016 for the Best New Artist award at the second annual Pulsar Awards, winning the award a month later. That same year, they were featured with the song "Nos vemos cómodos en este frío" on the compilation album NMC: pop de guitarras en Chile, which brought together the scene's most prominent bands. During this period, Diego Antimán joined Niños del Cerro as keyboardist, and released Nonato Coo on CD with a performance at the Sala Máster of Radio Universidad de Chile, as well as performed abroad for the first time at Lima PopFest in Peru.

In 2017, Piloto's label operations froze following the publication of the investigative report "Cuando ella habla, escucho la revolución" ("When She Speaks, I Hear the Revolution") by journalist Javiera Tapia, in which several women testified about sexual abuse and gender-based violence within the scene and the label. Though Niños del Cerro was not directly accused of anything, the label and several associated groups restructured or split, which led to the band signing to Quemasucabeza in early 2018. According to journalist Rodrigo García Soriano, this marked the point where bands like Niños del Cerro "began taking the path toward professionalization."

On June 1, 2018, they performed on that year's Primavera Sound festival at the Centre de Cultura Contemporània de Barcelona and the following day at the Parc del Fòrum. Two months later, they announced their second studio album, Lance, which was released on August 31 on digital platforms and as a free download on Quemasucabeza's website. The album received significant critical appraisal, which led to their first Latin American tours. On December 7, they performed Lance alongside the rest of their discography at Matucana 100 Cultural Center. Two years later, they released a live album of the concert for free titled No va a pasar el tiempo en vano, featuring 12 of the 18 songs performed that day.

In January 2020, the group released the single "Durmiendo en el parque" as an advance single for their first EP Cuauhtémoc. On March 20, they published Cuauhtémoc on digital platforms. Due to the COVID-19 pandemic, Niños del Cerro premiered the EP live via Quemasucabeza's YouTube channel on June 27, which also featured cover versions performed by artists including Diego Lorenzini, Medio Hermano, Dolorio & los Tunantes, and Maifersoni, among others. In 2021, Niños del Cerro parted ways with Quemasucabeza, and in April 2022 independently released the single "Tentempié", along with the tracks "Miel" and "Mi modesta ceguera personal", as lead singles for their third studio album Suave pendiente. On October 14, the group released Suave pendiente on digital platforms through Sello Fisura. Prior to its release, they issued several promotional singles, including "Sulamita", "Mamire", and "Esta enorme distancia". Shortly after its release, the album ranked as the third-best album of the year on the review platform Rate Your Music, the first album from Chile to achieve such acclaim.

In July 2025, Niños del Cerro released the single "Tembló", announcing a new album for that year. In August, they released "Canto al Mediodía"—produced by Yaima Cat and recorded by Yaima Cat, Emanuel Irarrázabal, and Daniel Ruiz Quintana—as the album's second single. They later revealed that the album would be titled Alma Tadema, with a CD release scheduled for Saturday, October 4, at the main campus of the University of Santiago, Chile, following the release of the final single "Seis de Enero" on the last Friday of September. On October 2026, Niños del Cerro performed four shows entitled Cuatro noches de Octubre, each dedicated to performing one of their studio albums in full, with prominent Chilean indie artists, like Candelabro, Chini.png and Asia Menor, as openers. During these shows, they announced their second EP, Algunos apuntes sobre la Sociedad Pastoril, released on October 13, 2026.

== Musical style ==
Niños del Cerro's music encompasses genres such as indie rock, indie pop, and neo-psychedelia. According to Nicolás Merino of Expectador, it was in 2018 with the release of their second album Lance that they "shifted their sound toward neo-psychedelia." Prior to that, their debut studio album was described as indie pop, as well as dream pop and post-punk. Outlets have also highlighted the incorporation of Andean music and Chilean folk elements in their music. The band members themselves have described the style of certain songs as "elusive pop" (pop esquivo) and "samba punk".

According to Juan Carlos Hidalgo of Revista Marvin, their live performances "boil over with fragments of post-rock, pop flashes, math rock passages, and moments where they sound almost like an Andean Animal Collective." They have also influenced subsequent Chilean indie bands, such as Candelabro.

== Members ==
Current members

- Simón Campusano – lead vocals, guitar (2012–present)
- Ignacio Castillo – guitar (2012–present)
- José Mazurett – drums (2014–present)
- Felipe Villarrubia – bass (2014–present)
- Diego Antimán – keyboards (2016–present)

== Discography ==
=== Studio albums ===
- Nonato Coo (2015)
- Lance (2018)
- Suave pendiente (2022)
- Alma Tadema (2025)

=== EPs ===
- Cuauhtémoc (2020)
- Algunos apuntes sobre la Sociedad Pastoril (2026)

=== Live albums ===
- No va a pasar el tiempo en vano (2020)

=== Singles ===
| Year | Title | Album / EP |
|---|---|---|
| 2014 | "La pajarería" | Nonato Coo |
| 2015 | "José de los Rayos" | Nonato Coo |
| 2017 | "Contigo" | Lance |
| 2018 | "Flores, labios, dedos" | Lance |
| 2018 | "El sueño pesa" (featuring Chini.png) | Lance |
| 2020 | "Durmiendo en el parque" | Cuauhtémoc |
| 2022 | "Tentempié" | Suave pendiente |
| 2022 | "Sulamita" | Suave pendiente |
| 2022 | "Mamire" | Suave pendiente |
| 2022 | "Esta enorme distancia" | Suave pendiente |
| 2025 | "Tembló" | Alma Tadema |
| 2025 | "Canto al Mediodía" | Alma Tadema |
| 2025 | "Seis de Enero" | Alma Tadema |
| 2026 | "Cuando Vas al Trabajo" | Algunos apuntes sobre la Sociedad Pastoril |
| 2026 | "El Mismo Sol para Todos" | Algunos apuntes sobre la Sociedad Pastoril |

== Awards and nominations ==
| Year | Award | Category | Nominated work | Result | Ref. |
|---|---|---|---|---|---|
| 2016 | Pulsar Awards | Best New Artist | Nonato Coo | Won | |
| 2018 | Índigo Awards | Best Independent Artist | Niños del Cerro | Nominated | |
| 2019 | Índigo Awards | Best Independent Artist | Niños del Cerro | Nominated | |
| 2019 | Índigo Awards | Independent Album of the Year | Lance | Nominated | |
| 2023 | Pulsar Awards | Album of the Year | Suave pendiente | Nominated | |
| 2023 | Pulsar Awards | Best Rock Artist | Niños del Cerro | Nominated | |
| 2026 | Pulsar Awards | Best Rock Album | Alma Tadema | Nominated | |

== Bibliography ==
- García Soriano, Rodrigo (2021). ¿Alguien puede decirme qué $%&/ es el indie? Conversaciones, datos y anécdotas de la escena musical independiente en Chile (bachelor's thesis). University of Chile.
- Villanueva Vergara, Javier (2019). Proyectos de identidad sociomusical en la escena indie-pop santiaguina (2015-2018) (bachelor's thesis). University of Chile.
