= Ramón Alberto Villaverde =

Uruguayan footballer (1930–1986)

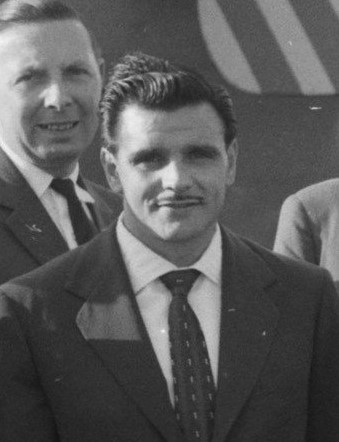
- Villaverde in 1960

Personal information
- Full name: Ramón Alberto Villaverde Vázquez
- Date of birth: March 16, 1930
- Place of birth: Montevideo, Uruguay
- Date of death: September 15, 1986 (aged 56)
- Place of death: Barcelona, Spain
- Position: Forward

Senior career*
Years	Team	Apps	(Gls)
1949–1950	Liverpool FC		
1950–1952	Cúcuta Deportivo	85	(54)
1953–1954	Millonarios	25	(15)
1954–1963	Barcelona	162	(54)
1963–1964	Racing de Santander	7	(2)
Total		279	(124)
- * Club domestic league appearances and goals

Ramón Alberto Villaverde Vázquez (March 16, 1930 – September 15, 1986) was an Uruguayan footballer who played for Barcelona in Spain, among other clubs.

== Career statistics ==
Appearances and goals by club, season and competition
Club	Season	League		
Club	Season	Division	Apps	Goals
Barcelona	1954–55	La Liga	27	14
Barcelona	1955–56	La Liga	29	13
Barcelona	1956–57	La Liga	15	4
Barcelona	1957–58	La Liga	12	5
Barcelona	1958–59	La Liga	1	0
Barcelona	1959–60	La Liga	18	3
Barcelona	1960–61	La Liga	19	3
Barcelona	1961–62	La Liga	22	11
Barcelona	1962–63	La Liga	19	1
Barcelona	Total		162	54
Racing de Santander	1962–63	Segunda División	7	2

== Honours ==
Colombian League: 1953

CF Barcelona

- Spanish Champions: 1958–59, 1959–60
- Copa del Generalísimo: 1956–57, 1958–59, 1962–63
- Inter-Cities Fairs Cup: 1955–58, 1958–60
- Small Club World Cup: 1957
