= César Morales (dancer) =

Chilean ballet dancer (born 1978)

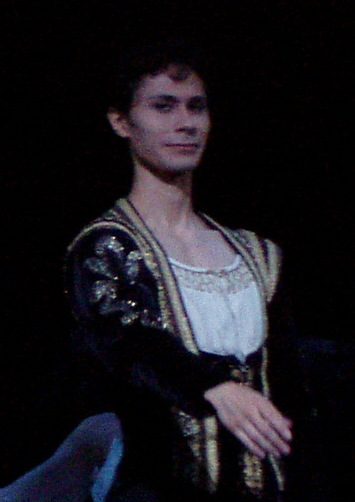
César Morales, 2007.

César Morales Anderson (born 17 November 1978) is a Chilean ballet dancer who, as of February 2014, is a principal dancer with the Birmingham Royal Ballet.

== Biography ==
Born in Rancagua, Chile, César Morales began dancing at the age of eleven at the Ballet School of the Municipal Theatre of Santiago, where he trained for three years before being offered a scholarship by Ben Stevenson to train at the academy of Houston Ballet. He returned to Santiago at the age of fifteen to complete his training and Ivan Nagy offered him a contract to join the Ballet de Santiago. After a year in the Corps de Ballet, he was promoted to soloist and a year later to principal dancer immediately after his first performance of Swan Lake. Morales danced with the Ballet de Santiago until 2003, when he moved to Paris to work as a freelance guest artist, dancing in Paris, Slovenia and the Czech Republic. He went on to join the English National Ballet in 2004, was Principal Guest Artist with Vienna Staatsoper in 2006 and then joined the Birmingham Royal Ballet in 2008.

== Repertoire ==
=== Ballet de Santiago ===
- Swan Lake - Prince Siegfried (Nagy)
- Giselle - Albrecht and the Peasant (Nagy)
- The Sleeping Beauty - The Prince and Bluebird (Stevenson, Wright)
- Last Four Songs (Stevenson)
- Romeo and Juliet - Romeo and Mercutio (Cranko)
- The Taming of the Shrew - Lucencio (Cranko)
- La Bayadère - Solor and Bronze Idol (Makarova)
- The Nutcracker - The Prince (Bustamante)
- La Fille Mal Gardée - Colas (Burr)
- Coppélia - Franz (Hynd)
- Don Quixote - Basilio (Pinto)
- Manon - Des Grieux (MacMillan)
- A Midsummer Night's Dream - Oberon and Divertimento (Balanchine)
- Theme and Variations - Principal Role (Balanchine)
- Serenade - Principal Role (Nebrada)
- The Right of Spring - The Chosen One (Tetley)
- In the Night - Principal Role (Robbins)
- Études - Principal Role (Lander)
- Le corsaire - Conrad (Bustamante)
- La Sylphide - James (Nagy).

=== English National Ballet ===
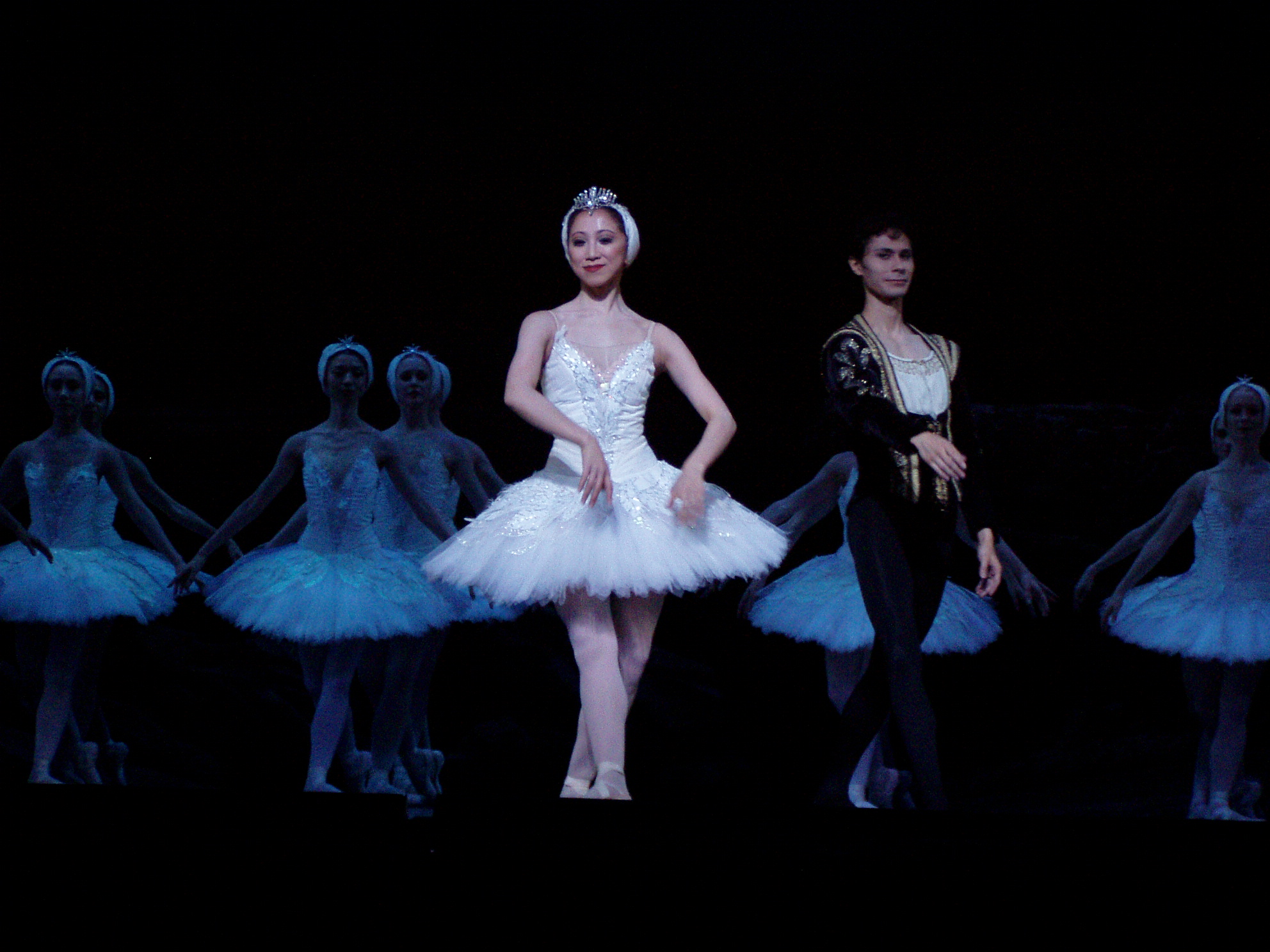
César Morales as Prince Siegfried and Erina Takahashi as Odette in the English National Ballet production of Swan Lake, evening performance at the Mayflower, Southampton on 17 November 2007.

- Swan Lake - Prince Siegfried (Deane's proscenium and Royal Albert Hall Productions)
- The Sleeping Beauty - The Prince and Bluebird (MacMillan)
- Giselle - Albrecht and the Peasant (Skeaping)
- The Nutcracker - The Prince (Hampson)
- Études - Principal Role (Lander)
- A Million Kisses to My Skin (Dawson)

=== Vienna Staatsoper ===
- Swan Lake - Prince Siegfried (Nureyev)
- The Sleeping Beauty - The Prince (Wright)
- Coppélia - Franz (Harangozó)

=== Birmingham Royal Ballet ===
- Raymonda (Nureyev),
- Sylvia (Bintley),
- Romeo and Juliet - Romeo and Mercutio (MacMillan)
- Serenade (Balanchine)
- Still Life at the Penguin Café (Bintley),
- Enigma Variations (Ashton),
- Beauty and The Beast (Bintley),
- The Nutcracker - The Prince (Wright)

== Awards ==
- Critics Circle for the Arts; Chile – Dancer of the Year 2000 (Des Grieux in Manon)
- Altazor Award – 2002, 2003
- Prague International Ballet Competition – Gold Medal 2002
- New York International Ballet Competition – Gold Medal 2003
