= Alejandro Brand =

Colombian footballer

Personal information
- Full name: Alejandro Brand Quintero
- Date of birth: 15 May 1950 (age 76)
- Place of birth: Medellín, Colombia
- Position: Midfielder

Senior career*
| Years | Team | Apps | (Gls) |
| 1969-1982 | Millonarios | 385 | (96) |
- * Club domestic league appearances and goals

Alejandro Brand Quintero, born in Medellín, Antioquia, Colombia, is a Colombian former football player and economist. He played for Millonarios and the Colombia national team.

His professional debut occurred in 1969, joining Millonarios, where he would spend his whole professional career. With Millonarios, he made a famous partnership with Willington Ortiz, and Jaime Morón, winning the DIMAYOR Colombian First Division Championship (now the Categoría Primera A) in 1972 and 1978, and scoring together more than 250 goals. He was also part of the National team that played the Brazil Independence Cup in 1972.

As of March 2022, Brand stands fifth in the list of top scorers for Millonarios (96 goals), and fourth in the list of most appearances (385 games).

== International career ==
Brand was part of the Colombia National Team that took part in qualifiers for the FIFA World Cup in 1970, 1974, and 1978, although he was unable to play the last one as a result of a long-term injury that led to his retirement from the national team in 1978.

== Clubs ==
| Club | Country | Years |
|---|---|---|
| Millonarios | Colombia | 1969-1982 |

== Stats ==
=== National championships ===
| Tournament | Club | Country | Year |
|---|---|---|---|
| Primera División | Millonarios | Colombia | 1972 |
| Primera División | Millonarios | Colombia | 1978 |
