= Fundación Favaloro =

The Favaloro Foundation (Fundación Favaloro para la Investigación y la Docencia Médica) is an Argentine scientific institution dedicated to medical teaching and research. It was founded in 1975 by René Favaloro with the support of the Cleveland Clinic in the United States where Favaloro worked for many years.

== History ==
After working in medical research at the Cleveland Clinic in the United States, Favaloro decided to create a department of Cardiovascular Surgery and Anatomy in Buenos Aires.

In 1980 the Department of Teaching and Research (Departamento de Docencia e Investigación de la Fundación Favaloro) was founded and in the same year, in collaboration with the Department of Artificial Organs of the University of Utah, Favaloro implanted the first artificial heart. Between 1980 and 1982 the collaboration continued and 16 transplants were carried out. The patients were monitored by COMDU (Cardiac Output Monitoring and Diagnostic Unit) in order to improve the medical assistance provided to patients with artificial hearts. The project was canceled in 1982 due to budgetary problems but the Basic Investigation Unit (División de Investigación Básica) continued working on other coronary problems.

Over the years the Departamento de Docencia e investigación changed its name to The Biomedical Sciences University Institute (Instituto Universitario de Ciencias Biomédicas) and the Basic Investigation Unit changed its name to the Institute of Basic scientific Investigation (Instituto de Investigación en Ciencias Básicas). These projects eventually resulted in the creation of the Universidad Favaloro in 1998.

On June 2, 1992 the Institute of Cardiology and cardiovascular surgery (Instituto de Cardiología y Cirugía Cardiovascular) was inaugurated and on June 20, 1992 the first operation was carried out. Towards the end of the 20th Century the Favaloro Foundation became immersed in debt. For this reason and due to the overwhelming corruption of the health system, René Favaloro committed suicide with a gunshot to the heart on July 29, 2000.

Since his death the foundation has survived partly thanks to the bequest left by Favaloro, to remain one of the most important cardiovascular research institutions in Latin America.

== Declaration and principles ==
- Honesty
- Work with passion, strength and sacrifice without limits.
- Reject the influences of dogmatism, personal prejudice and agendas.
- Your contributions have value only when they are the product of free will without limits.
- Never neglect ethics and understand that they are necessary for the morale and the well being of the patients and their families.
- Remember that humility is necessary to work in a team, the sacrifice of the individual benefits the collective. The development of science demonstrates this. The individual was replaced by the collective a long time ago.
- You must sacrifice everything on the altar of the truth and nothing but the truth, always say what you think, nothing survives built on a foundation of lies.
- If you alleviate the suffering of other people and at the same time improve human knowledge the satisfaction will be greater.
- The basic subject of our work, and therefore the only beneficiary will be the patient.
- The only true prize comes when your soul feels, in the silence of reflection, the spiritual pleasure of a job well done.

== See also ==
- Universidad Favaloro
