= Florencia de Amesti =

Chilean university teacher (1925–2006)

- Born: Florencia Laura de Amesti Gazitúa; 6 April 1925; Santiago, Chile
- Died: 22 May 2006 (aged 81); Santiago, Chile
- Education: University of Chile
- Spouse: Hernán Davanzo Corte
- Children: 1

Florencia Laura de Amesti Gazitúa (6 April 1925 – 22 May 2006) was a Chilean engraver, printmaker and educator. De Amesti was an original member of Taller 99 (Spanish: Workshop 99).

== Biography ==
De Amesti was born 6 April 1925 in Santiago to Félix de Amesti and Rebeca Gazitúa Alvarez de la Rivera. De Amesti was the sister of the painter Leonor De Amesti.

De Amesti studied painting and drawing at the University of Chile. In 1956, De Amesti enrolled at the newly established Taller 99 where she specialized in metal engraving and studied under Nemesio Antúnez.

Between 1969 and 1972, De Amesti taught engraving at the Las Condes Cultural Institute and the Providencia Cultural Institute (Spanish: Fundación Cultural de Providencia) in Santiago. In 1970, De Amesti won the ARMCO award at the IV American Print Biennial (Spanish: Bienal Americana de Grabado).

In 2003, De Amesti's work Collages y Dibujos was nominated for the Altazor Award of the National Arts in engraving and drawing.

De Amesti was married to Hernán Davanzo Corte, a psychiatrist, with whom she had one child.

== Awards and nominations ==
Award	Year	Category	Nominated work	Result	Ref(s)
Bienal Americana de Grabado	1970	ARMCO	El hombre está lleno de oscuridad, como una montaña	Won	
Altazor Awards	2003	Engraving and Drawing	Collages y Dibujos	Nominated	
