= Erina Takahashi =

Japanese ballet dancer

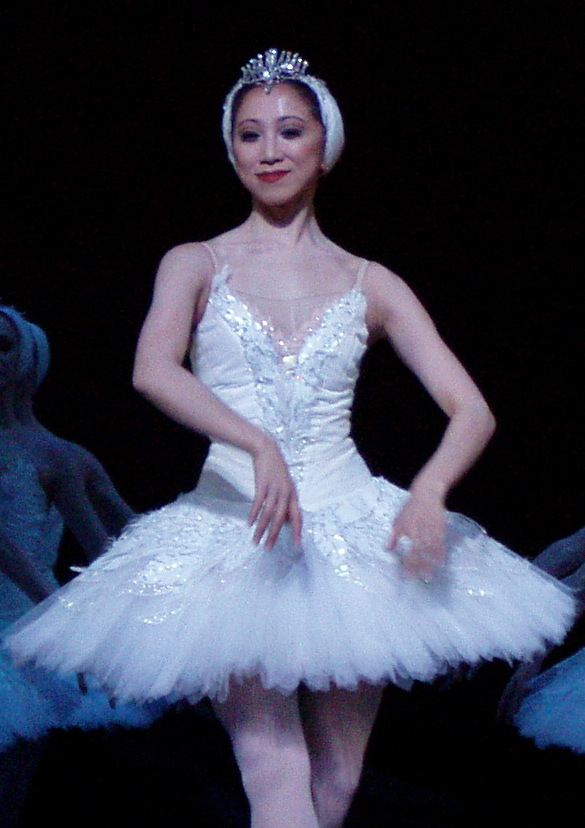
Erina Takahashi as Odette in the English National Ballet production of Swan Lake, evening performance at the Mayflower, Southampton on 17 November 2007.

Erina Takahashi, born in the city of Kushiro in Hokkaidō, Japan, is a Lead Principal dancer with the English National Ballet. She was the Critics Circle Best Female Newcomer in 2001.

== Career and repertory ==
Erina Takahashi trained in the Kushiro Ballet Academy under the direction of Kou Yano before joining the English National Ballet in 1996. Upon joining the English National Ballet she showed continuous improvement leading to her becoming a Principal dancer in 2000 and then Lead Principal in 2007.

In 1992 Erina Takahashi was the winner of the Chubu Newspaper Company Award (Chubu All Japan Ballet Competition) and winner of Best Female Newcomer at the 2002 Critics' Circle National Dance Awards. She is Patron of New English Ballet Theatre and appears as Gulnare in English National Ballet's production of Le Corsaire on DVD.

Her lead roles include: Manon, Swan Lake, Sleeping Beauty, Romeo & Juliet, Giselle, Cinderella, Coppélia, Nutcracker, Le Corsaire, Etudes, La Bayadère, Raymonda, Paquita, Double Concerto (Hampson), Square Dance, Who Cares?, Tchaikovsky Pas de Deux (Balanchine), The Rite of Spring (MacMillan), The Snow Queen (Corder), A Million Kisses to my Skin (Dawson), Voluntaries (Tetley), Les Sylphides, Don Quixote pas de deux, Impromtu (Deane), Perpetuum Mobile (Hampson), Alice in Wonderland (Deane) Petite Mort, In the Middle, Somewhat Elevated, No Man’s Land (Liam Scarlett), M-Dao (Yabin Wang), Akram Khan's Giselle, La Sylphide and Approximate Sonata
