= Favaloro University =

Private university in the city of Buenos Aires, Argentina

Coordinates: 34.61431°S 58.39039°W

- Universidad Favaloro
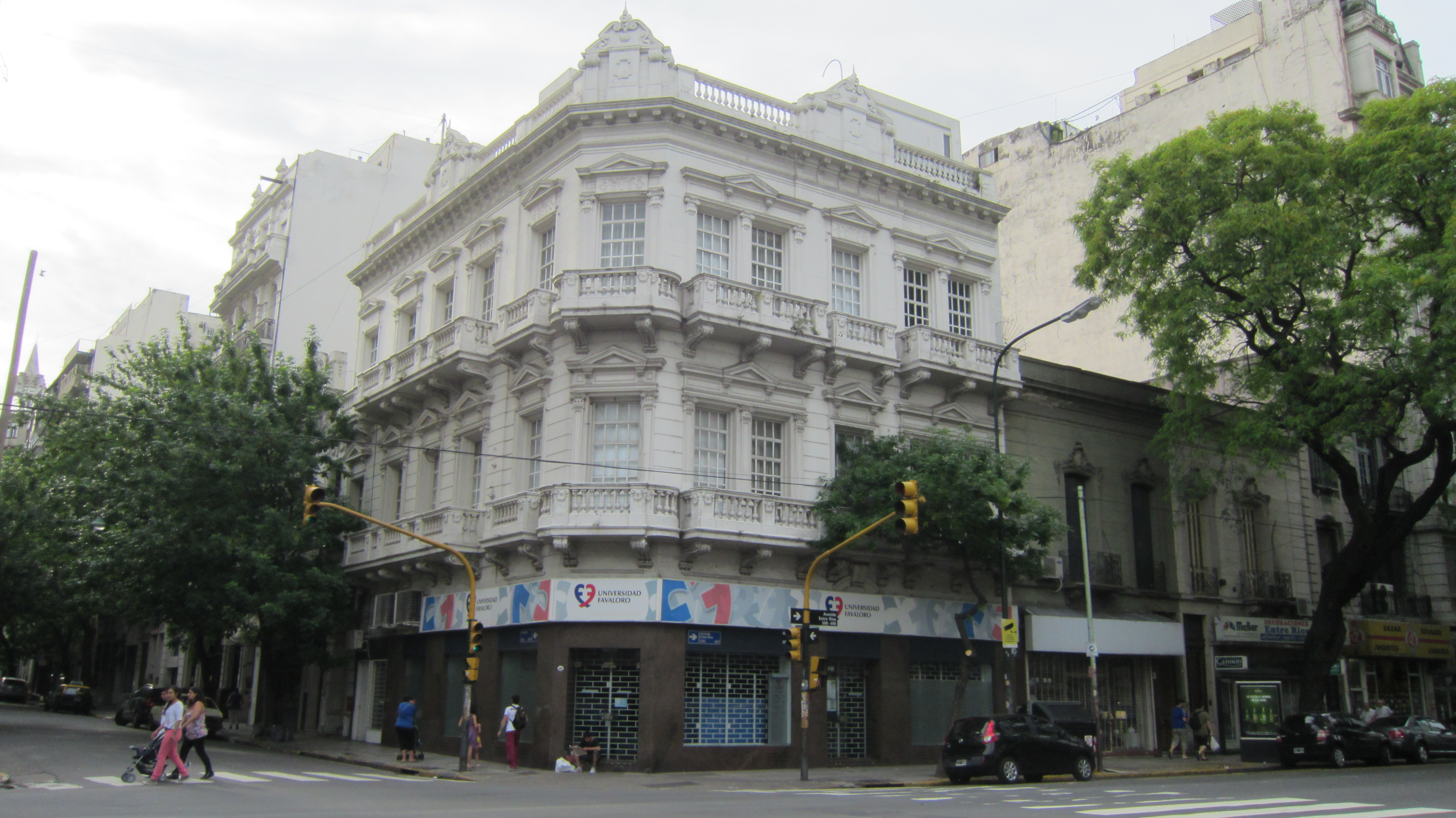
- Motto: Formación humanística - Rigor científico - Prestigio internacional (Spanish)
- Motto in English: Humanistic formation - Scientific rigor - International prestige
- Type: Private
- Established: 1992; 34 years ago
- Rector: Prof. Jorge Tissera
- Students: 2,800
- Undergraduates: 1,624
- Postgraduates: 1,176
- Location: Buenos Aires, Argentina
- Campus: Urban
- Website: favaloro.edu.ar
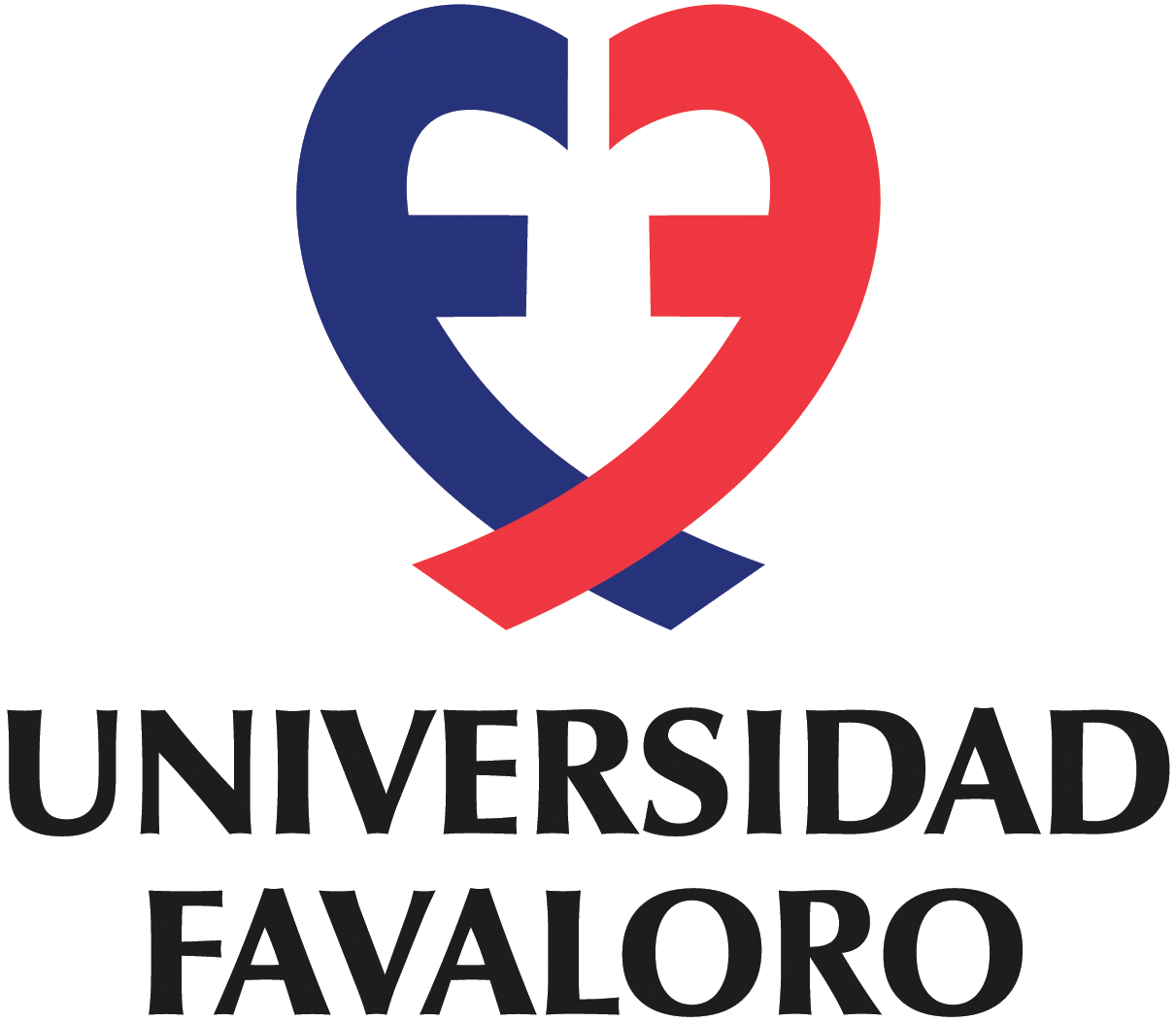

Favaloro University (Spanish: Universidad Favaloro) is a private university in Buenos Aires, Argentina. It was founded by surgeon René Favaloro in 1992; it obtained its definitive authorization on October 23, 2003, by decree 963/03 of President Néstor Kirchner. Favaloro did not see his project completely realised, dying by suicide a few years before it was finished.

== Introduction ==
The origin of the institution is based in a research center. The university hospital and the university followed a natural development to complement and integrate several areas in the biomedical spectrum. The Research and Development Board (CID) ensures the progress of scientific research and technological development at the Favaloro University, deciding on the principal research orientations and supervising the coherence of scientific policy, particularly regarding the creation of laboratories and research programs. It also establishes the principles and dictates the evaluation mechanisms of research quality and investigator performance.

Research at the Favaloro University is organized in research projects. These projects are under the direction of one or more investigators who are directly responsible for the development of the action plan in the established period. The specific objectives of the relationship between the Research and Development Board and the departmental structure of the Favaloro University are the articulation of the Departments, the Faculty of Medical Sciences, the Faculty of Engineering and Exact and Natural Sciences and the Institute of Cardiology and Cardiovascular Surgery in connection with the research projects.

== History ==
In the beginning, René Favaloro did his medical practice in the Sanatorio Güemes. Later, he realized that an investigation group of his own was necessary. In 1974 he commended Ricardo Pichel (current Favaloro University rector) for the birth and development of this new area. In 1978, the Newspapers & Magazines Distributors Society (SDDRA) made possible the beginning of investigation and teaching activities. For many years, Favaloro financed investigation costs with his own resources. In 1980 the Teaching and Investigation Department of Favaloro University was founded with Pichel in the lead. Later that year the Favaloro Foundation, with the collaboration with Willem Kolff in the Artificial Organs Department at the University of Utah, implanted the first artificial heart in a calf. Between 1980 and 1982 sixteen more hearts were implanted in calves.

At the same time Peter Willshaw, a Favaloro Foundation investigator, developed (in collaboration with the University of Utah) a measuring device called COMDU (Cardiac Output Monitoring and Diagnostic Unit), which improved artificial heart flux measurement. This device was then used worldwide for investigation and development purposes.

The artificial heart project was then abandoned due to excessive costs. Nevertheless, the acquired equipment made many basic investigation lines in chronically instrumented animals possible. Months later, Alberto Crotoggini, Juan Barra, Pichel, and Willshaw made important contributions to the comprehension of heart and circulatory system mechanisms. A 1983 agreement with the University of California meant a big improvement in ventricular function investigations. That same year Biology Graduates Jorge Negroni and Elena Lascano joined the investigation field and started work on mathematical models for cardiac function comprehension with Edmundo Cabrera Fischer, in charge of arterial function physiology.

Nowadays, most of the Favaloro Foundation's teaching and investigation activity is done at Favaloro University.

== Faculties ==
- Faculty of Engineering and Exact and Natural Sciences
- Faculty of Medical Sciences
- Faculty of Human and Behavioral Sciences

== Degrees ==
=== Faculty of Engineering and Exact and Natural Sciences ===
- Biology
- Bachelor in Engineering Sciences

=== Faculty of Medical Sciences ===
- Medicine
- Kinesiology and Physiatry
- Nursery
- Psychology

=== Faculty of Human and Behavioral Sciences ===
- Careers and courses
- Distance careers and courses
