= Small Club World Cup =

Pequeña Copa del Mundo (Small World Cup)
- Organiser(s): Venezuelan companies
- Founded: 1952
- Abolished: 1975; 51 years ago
- Region: Venezuela
- Teams: 4
- Last champions: East Germany (1975)
- Most championships: (Spain) Real Madrid (Brazil) São Paulo (2 titles each)

The Small World Cup (Spanish: Pequeña Copa del Mundo) was a football tournament held in Venezuela between 1952 and 1975 (with some journalists considering 1952–57 the period of greatest relevance, and the second period that took place between 1963 and 1975 as of minor relevance). In most of the occasions, the competition was played by four participants from Europe and South America. In the first period, clubs from three countries would win the tournament: Spain, Brazil and Colombia. Five clubs won the trophy in this period: Real Madrid, São Paulo, Millonarios, Corinthians, and Barcelona.

When the Europeans Champions Clubs' Cup was started in 1955, the Venezuelan competition lost importance and was discontinued in 1957. Although the tournament was relaunched in 1963, its relevance decreased when the Intercontinental Cup (first held in 1960) was established as the major, official intercontinental competition for both South American and European clubs.

During the 1963–75 period, the trophy was also named "Copa Ciudad de Caracas". However, there is controversy surrounding this name, as during this period there were multiple trophies and championships named Taça Ciudad de Caracas in the city. Thus, in 1966 Botafogo was considered the winner and competed against Santos in the grand final, winning the Trophy called Journalists Circle Cup (Copa Círculo de Pediodicos Deportivos), however Valencia also competed with Vitória Guimarães and won the Símon Bolivar trophy. Thus, the winner of the Caracas tournament that year is controversial, as of the greatest relevance was the Botafogo and Santos game, where great players such as Garrincha and Pelé starred. Then, in 1967, the tournament in Caracas was, again, the Journalists Circle Cup (Copa Círculo de Pediodicos Deportivos), where teams such as Barcelona, Botafogo and Peñarol played. And, later in the same year, the so-called Copa Cuadricentenario de Caracas took place, which was played between Athletic Bilbao, Platense and Académica Coimbra, regional teams that no longer exist.

In 1968 the tournament that took place in Caracas offered the Oldemario Ramos Trophy. It was played between Benfica, Botafogo and Argentina XI., with Botafogo becoming the champion.

This competition is considered by some 21-st century sources as a predecessor of the Intercontinental Cup, in that it regularly featured clubs from Europe and South America. However, there is no 1952–1960 evidence indicating that it had any influence for the creation of the Intercontinental Cup, or that it was hailed in 1952–1957 as a club world trophy. Nevertheless, some clubs like Real Madrid highlight it in the trophy section of their websites and publications. The main attraction of the competition in the 1950's were Spanish and Brazilian clubs. The Spanish 1950's press referred to it as "the so-called Club World Cup", "the a.k.a. Club World Cup" and "the cup pompously called World Cup by its sponsor" (referring to Damián Gaubeka, the Caracas-based Basque businessman that sponsored the cup), indicating that its dimension in 1950's Spain was not seen as that of a club world trophy. In 1953, Brazilian club Vasco da Gama relinquished the invitation to participate, and in 1957, Fluminense relinquished it, in stark contrast to the relevance the Brazilian clubs have entitled to competitions such as the "World Club Cup" of the 1950's Brazilian FA, the Intercontinental Cup and the FIFA Club World Cup. Thus, the 1950's evidence suggests that the name "Small Club World Cup" was then seen mostly as a marketing strategy for the cup, and that the cup was not then regarded as "true" club world honour.

== List of champions ==
Ed.	Year	Champion	Runner-up	Tournament Name
1	1952	(Spain) Real Madrid	(Brazil) Botafogo	Pequeña Copa del Mundo
2	1953 (I) (Note: There were 2 tournaments played in the same year; none was held in the next calendar year, 1954 due to the 1954 FIFA World Cup.)	(Colombia) Millonarios	(Argentina) River Plate	Pequeña Copa del Mundo
3	1953 (II)	(Brazil) Corinthians	(Italy) Roma	Pequeña Copa del Mundo
4	1955	(Brazil) São Paulo	(Spain) Valencia	Pequeña Copa del Mundo
5	1956	(Spain) Real Madrid	(Brazil) Vasco da Gama	Pequeña Copa del Mundo
6	1957	(Spain) Barcelona	(Brazil) Botafogo	Pequeña Copa del Mundo
7	1963	(Brazil) São Paulo	(Spain) Real Madrid	Pequeña Copa del Mundo
8	1965	(Portugal) Benfica	(Spain) Atlético Madrid	Copa María Dolores Gabeka
9	1966	(Spain) Valencia	(Portugal) Vitória Guimarães	Troféo Simón Bolívar
10	1967	(Spain) Athletic Bilbao	(Portugal) Académica de Coimbra	Copa Cuadricentenario de Caracas
11	1969	(Czechoslovakia) Spartak Trnava (Note: Conflicting accounts of which Czechoslovak team played in the tournament; RSSSF states Sparta Prague won the tournament but that other sources list the winner as Trnava. Czechoslovak newspaper definitely states Trnava.)	(Spain) Deportivo La Coruña	Torneo Reyes de Caracas
12	1970	(Portugal) Vitória de Setúbal	(Brazil) Santos	Torneo Reyes de Caracas
13	1975	East Germany (Note: Champion after winning the final v Boavista. It was the only time the champion was defined by a bracket instead of a round-robin tournament like the previous editions.)	(Portugal) Boavista	Pequeña Copa del Mundo

== Titles by country ==
Country	Titles
Spain	5
Brazil	3
Portugal	2
Colombia	1
Czechoslovakia	1
East Germany	1

== Performances by continent ==
Confederation	Winners
Europe	9
South America	4
