= Armando Uribe =

Chilean writer and lawyer (1933–2020)

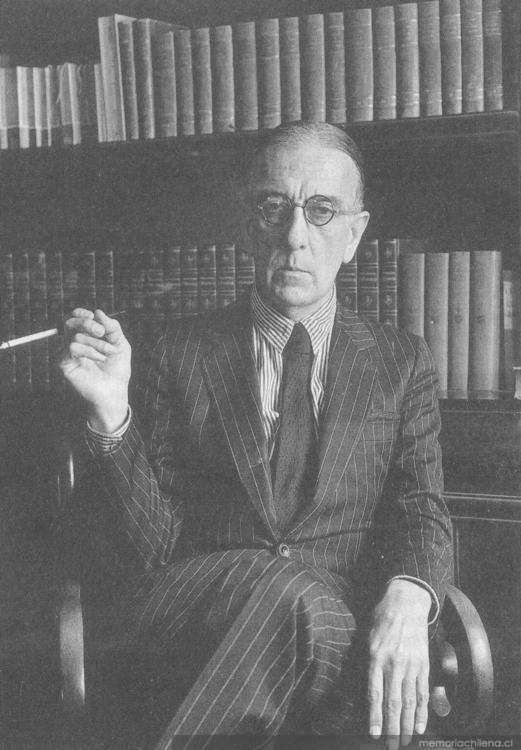
Armando Uribe Arce

Armando Uribe Arce (Note: In this Chilean name, the first or paternal surname is Uribe and the second or maternal family name is Arce.) (October 28, 1933 – January 22, 2020) was a Chilean writer, poet, lawyer, and diplomat.

== Biography ==
Uribe was born in Santiago. He was educated at the Saint George's College. He later studied law in the University of Chile and received his law degree in 1959, where he served as a law professor for over 30 years.

In addition, Uribe held various positions in law at the Pontifical Catholic University of Chile, Michigan State University, University of Sassari in Italy, and University of Paris 1 Pantheon-Sorbonne in France. He published numerous works on politics, religion, criminal law, and mining, and was a member of the Chilean Academy of Language and the Royal Spanish Academy.

Uribe served a tenure as a diplomat between 1967 and 1973, being assigned to United Nations in 1968, and later the Chilean embassy in the United States between 1968 and 1970. In 1971, he became Chile's ambassador to the People's Republic of China under the Salvador Allende government until the 1973 Chilean coup d'état. Due to the recognition of the new Augusto Pinochet regime by the Chinese government, Uribe denounced the junta, after which he was dismissed from the Ministry of Foreign Affairs. As a result, he went into exile with his family in France, not returning to Chile until 1990.

Uribe won the Chilean National Prize for Literature in 2004.
