= DeRose =

De Rose is an Italian surname that is a variant of De Rosa. It may also be found as DeRose or Derose. It's predominantly found in Italy and in Americans of Italian origin. It's also found in certain regions in Tamil Nadu within the Paravar community and in Sri Lanka.

Notable people with the surname include:

== De Rose ==
- Alessandro De Rose, Italian high diver
- Anthony Lewis De Rose, American painter
- Charles de Tricornot de Rose, French Army pilot
- Emilio De Rose (1939–2018), Italian dermatologist and socialist politician
- Francesco De Rose, Italian football player
- Gerard de Rose (1918–1987), English painter and teacher
- Sherman de Rose, Sri Lankan LGBT activist

== DeRose/Derose ==
- Chris DeRose (born 1948), American animal rights activist
- Chris DeRose (author) (born 1980), American writer
- Daniel Eugene DeRose (born 1962), American businessperson
- Dena DeRose (born 1966), American jazz pianist, singer and educator
- Jason DeRose, American journalist
- Jim DeRose (born 1967), American college soccer coach
- Kathleen Traynor DeRose, American fintech expert and a finance professor
- Keith DeRose (born 1962), American philosopher
- Lenny DeRose, Canadian studio engineer and music producer
- Peter DeRose (1900–1953), American composer
- Philippe Derose (born 1952), American politician
- Steven DeRose (born 1960), American linguist

== See also ==
- De Rose Hill, South Australia
