= Rosa (surname) =

Rosa is a surname. It is common as a Galician, Portuguese, Spanish, Italian, Maltese, Arabic, Polish, Czech, Slovak, Russian, and Hungarian language surname. In most languages, it means 'rose', but in Polish, Czech and Slovak (Czech and Slovak feminine: Rosová), it means 'dew'. Notable people with the surname include:

== Rosa ==
- Aaron Rosa (born 1983), American mixed martial arts fighter
- Anderson Rosa (born 1993), Brazilian footballer
- Antonín Rosa (born 1986), Czech footballer
- Carl Rosa (1842–1889), German-born English musical impresario
- Charles D. Rosa (1870–1959), American politician and judge
- Don Rosa (born 1951), American comic book writer and illustrator
- Francesco Rosa (?–1687), Italian painter
- Francis Rosa (1920–2012), American sports journalist
- Gabriela Rosa (born 1966), American politician
- Hermann Rosa (2011–1981), German sculptor and architect
- João Guimarães Rosa (1908–1967), Brazilian writer
- Kacper Rosa (born 1994), Polish footballer
- Lucien Rosa (born 1944), Sri Lankan long-distance runner
- Luiz Pinguelli Rosa (1942–2022), Brazilian scientist
- Márcio Rosa (born 1997), Cape Verdean footballer
- Marco Rosa (born 1982), Canadian ice hockey player
- Marek Rosa (born 1979), Slovak video game producer and designer
- Michał Rosa (born 1963), Polish movie director
- Monika Rosa (born 1986), Polish politician
- Noel Rosa (1910–1937), Brazilian singer
- Orlando Rosa (footballer) (1932–2011), Brazilian footballer
- Orlando Rosa (wrestler) (born 1977), Puerto Rican wrestler
- Orlando Rosa Pinto (1911–?), Brazilian footballer
- Pâmela Rosa (born 1999), Brazilian skateboarder
- Paulo Sérgio Rosa (born 1969), Brazilian footballer
- Pavel Rosa (born 1977), Czech ice hockey player
- Salvator Rosa (1615–1673), Italian painter
- Sam Rosa (1866–1940), Australian socialist and journalist
- Samuel Rosa (musician) (born 1966), Brazilian singer
- Tatiana Rosová (born 1961), Slovak sociologist and politician

== de Rosa ==
- Alberto Fernández de Rosa (born 1944), Argentine actor
- Ángel María de Rosa (1888–1970), Argentine sculptor and philanthropist
- Anna Palm de Rosa (1859–1924), Swedish artist and landscape painter
- Antonino De Rosa (born 1981), Italian-American gamer
- Clem De Rosa (1925–2011), American musician
- Diana de Rosa (1602–1643), Neapolitan painter
- Domenica De Rosa (born 1963), British crime novelist
- Eugene De Rosa (1894 – c. 1945), Italian-American architect
- Fernando de Rosa (1908–1936), Italian failed assassin
- Franco De Rosa (born 1944), Italian actor
- Gaetano De Rosa (born 1973), Italian footballer
- Gianni De Rosa (1956–2008), Italian footballer
- Pacecco De Rosa (1606–1656), Italian painter
- Raffaele De Rosa (born 1987), Italian motorcycle road racer
- Tommaso de Rosa (1621–1695), Italian Roman Catholic bishop
- Tullio De Rosa (1923–1994), Italian enologist
- William De Rosa, American cellist
- Yvonne De Rosa (born 1975), Italian photographer

== DeRosa ==
- Anthony DeRosa, American animator
- Jon DeRosa (born 1978), American singer
- Mark DeRosa (born 1975), American baseball player
- Melissa DeRosa, American former government official
- Stephen DeRosa (born 1968), American actor
- Tina DeRosa (1944–2007), American writer
- Vincent DeRosa (1920–2022), American musician

== da Rosa ==
- Aldo da Rosa (1917–2015), Brazilian electrical engineer
- Gonzalo de los Santos da Rosa (born 1976), Uruguayan footballer
- Jair da Rosa Pinto (1921–2005), Brazilian footballer
- Orlando da Rosa Pinto (1911–?), Brazilian footballer
- Roberto da Rosa Pinto (1937–1994), Brazilian footballer
- Thiago da Rosa Correa (born 1982), Brazilian footballer

== Other ==
- Daniel la Rosa (born 1985), German racing driver
- Pedro de la Rosa (born 1971), Spanish racing driver

== See also ==
- Rosa (given name)
- Rosas (surname)
- Rosa (disambiguation), includes de Rosa
- Rose (disambiguation)
- DeRose
