= Rosai =

Rosai is an Italian surname. Notable people with the surname include:

- Juan Rosai (1940–2020), Italian-born American physician
- Ottone Rosai (1895–1957), Italian painter

== See also ==
- Rosa (surname)
