= Karl Albiker =

German sculptor

Karl Albiker (16 September 1878 – 26 February 1961) was a German sculptor, lithographer and teacher of fine arts. Albiker studied with Auguste Rodin in Paris. From 1919 to 1945 he was a professor at the Dresden Academy of Fine Arts. His monumental statues, like those of Georg Kolbe, reflected National Socialist heroic realism. Albiker created the relay racers for Berlin's Reich Sports Field and various war monuments, including those in Karlsruhe, Freiburg im Breisgau, and Greiz.

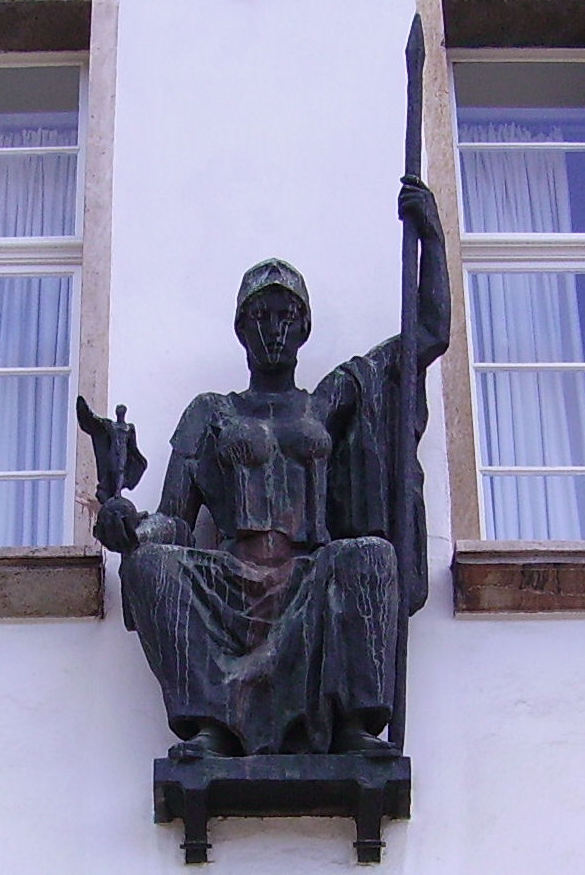
Minerva, 1931 (see below as well)

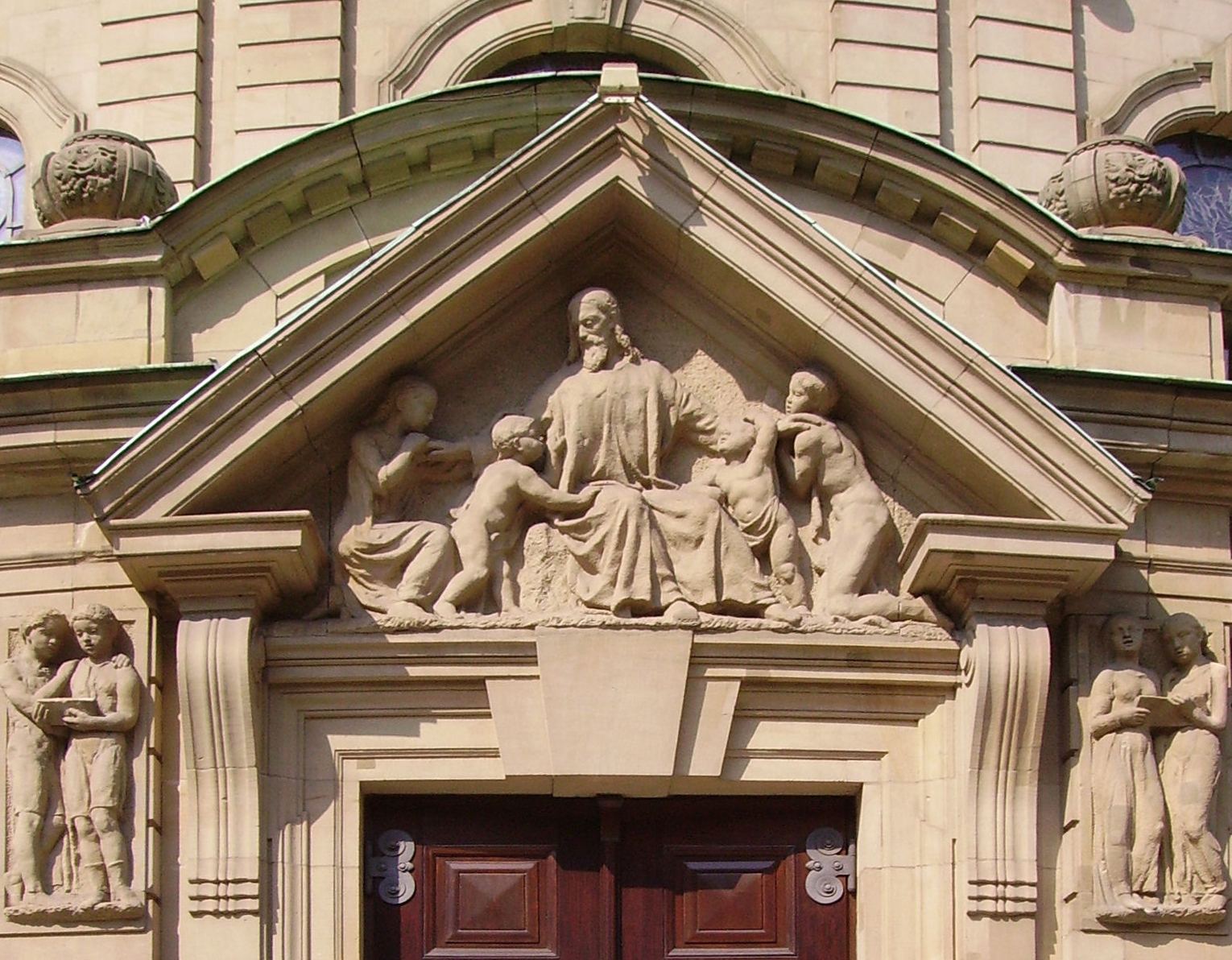
Entry of the Church of Christ in Mannhein

== Biography ==
Albiker was born in Ühlingen-Birkendorf and studied at the Academy of Fine Arts, Karlsruhe; after college he was a friend of, among others, the expressionist painter Karl Hofer. During the years 1899 and 1900 he attended the Académie Julian in Paris and the studio of Antoine Bourdelle. In Paris he met his admired sculptor Auguste Rodin, who became his teacher with time. Later Karl Albiker lived for a time in Munich (1900–1903), and then took a study trip to Rome (1903–1905). In 1905 he moved into a home studio in Ettlingen. The award of the Villa Romana prize in 1910 allowed him to stay in Florence, where he met the philosopher Leopold Ziegler, who dedicated to Albiker his work on art entitled Florentinische Introduktion (1911).

In 1919 the artist Albiker was a professor at the Dresden Academy of Fine Arts and was hired by the local art school. He was one of the important teachers of these schools, and in 1927 he founded both the Secession of Baden and the New Munich Secession.

The National Socialist government, attracted by their involvement in architectural projects, used sculptors such as Karl Albiker, Richard Scheibe and Joseph Wackerle, who had already made names for themselves in the 1920s, during the creation of large sculptures for the public and for administrative buildings, including the reconstruction project of the Berlin Forum on Sport, the Reichssportfeld. Albiker was commissioned to design the sculptural program collectively, under the supervision of the architect Werner March, who was in charge of the overall design. Albiker in the 1930s formed part of the jury of "German art".

During the bombing of the Second World War, his house and studio were destroyed. In 1947 he returned to his home region of Baden, and established the Karl Albiker Foundation, through which, his own works and those of his private art collection, including more than 80 works by Karl Hofer, were passed into the possession of the Museum of the City of Ettlingen.

Karl Albiker died in 1961 at the age of 82 in Ettlingen.

His son, Carl Albiker (1905–1996), was an art historian and photographer.

== Works ==
In addition to his sculptures for public spaces, Karl Albiker made models for the manufacture of majolica pieces from Karlsruhe (Meissen porcelain). He also designed medals, medallions and lithographs.

His works are included in the Gallery of the City of Ettlingen, Ettlingen Castle, and the Municipal Museum of Zwickau, among others.

Among his most outstanding works are the following:

- The Lament (Die Klage) also known as The Mourner (Die Trauernde) (bronze, height: 137 cm), Hagen, Karl Ernst Osthaus-Museum
- 1925: Pallas Athena – Pallas Athene, monument to those killed in the First World War, at the University of Karlsruhe, Technical School
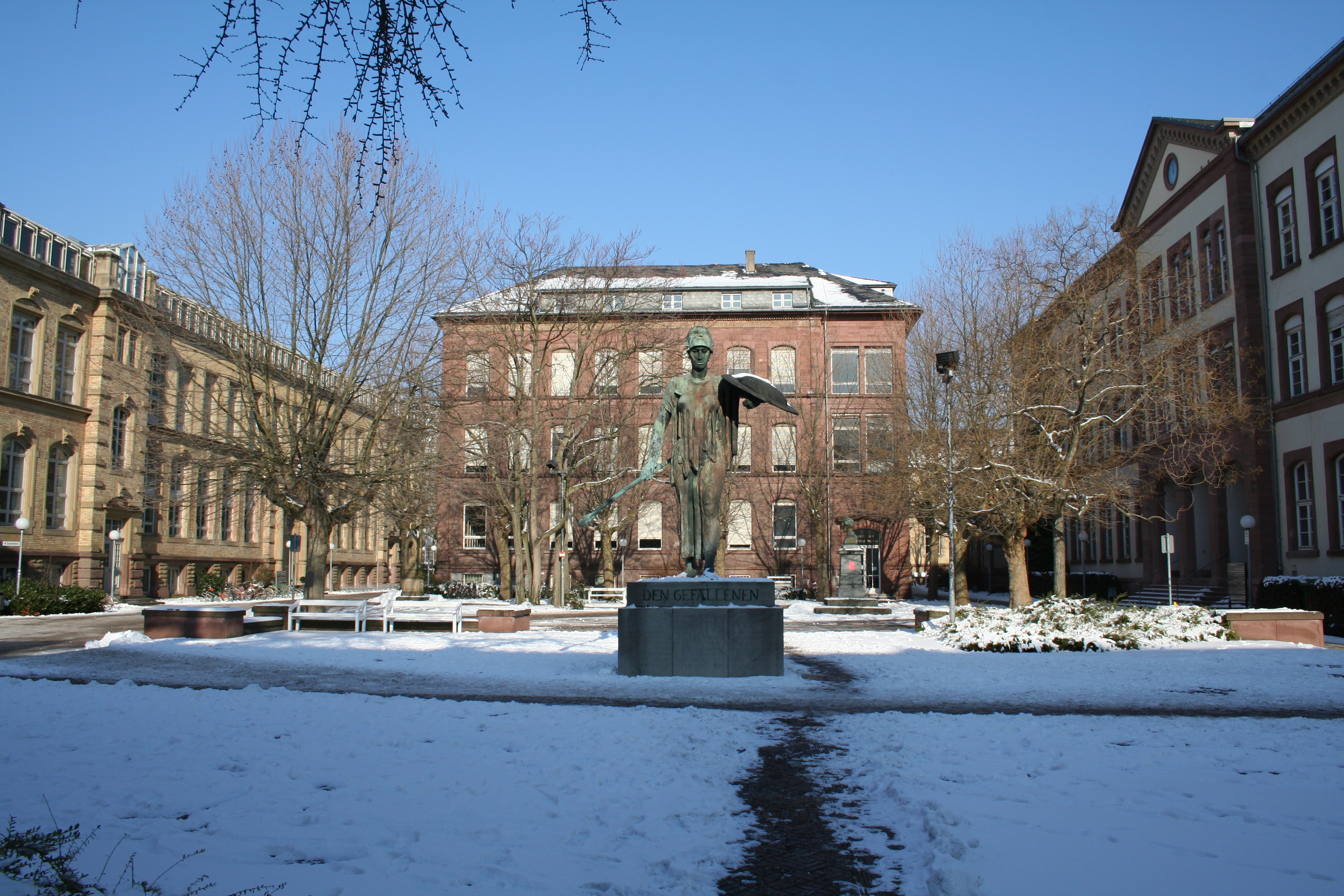
Athena

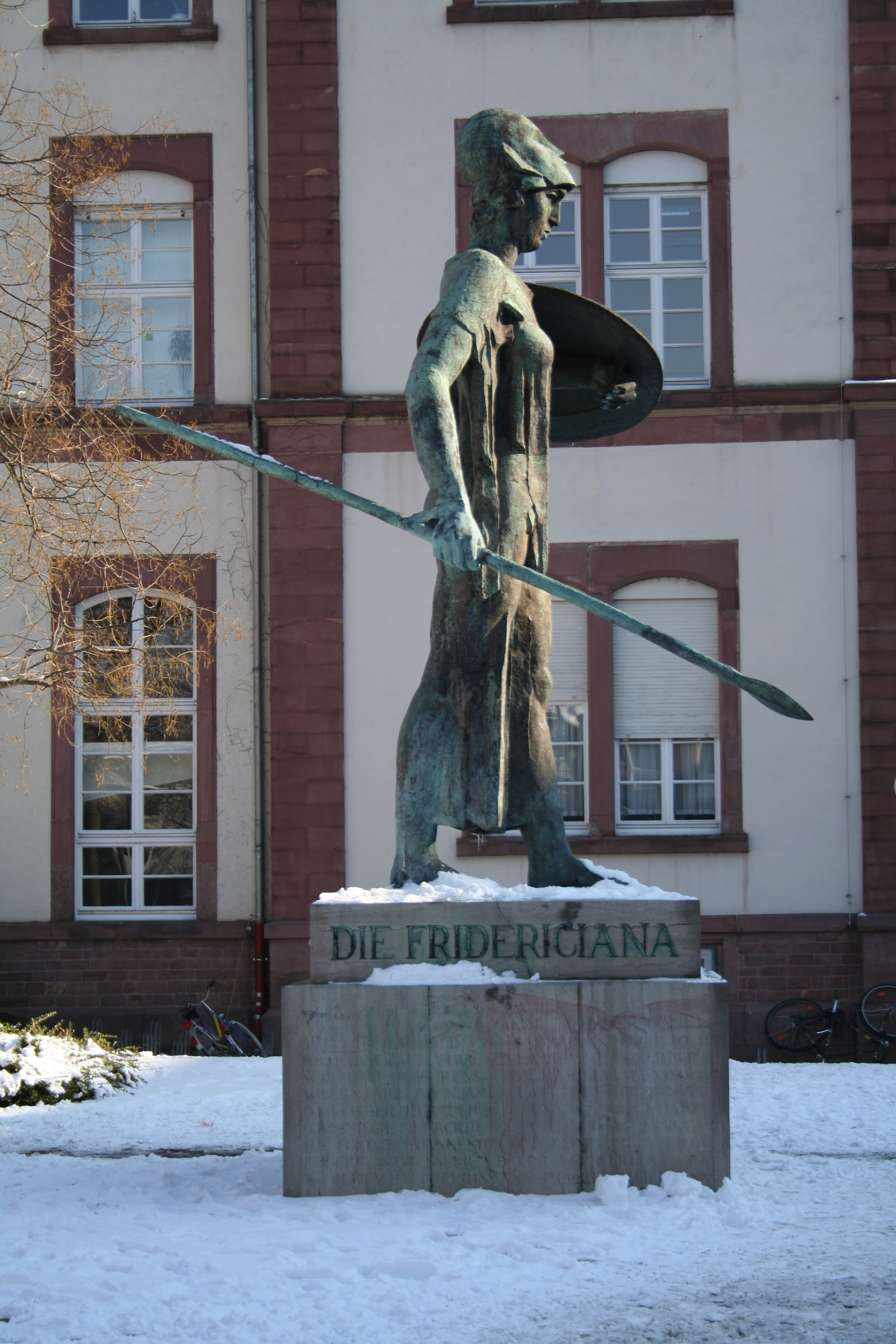
Athena (side view)
- 1926: Christ Figure – Christusfigur, sandstone, above the main entrance of the Church of the Redeemer (Dresden)
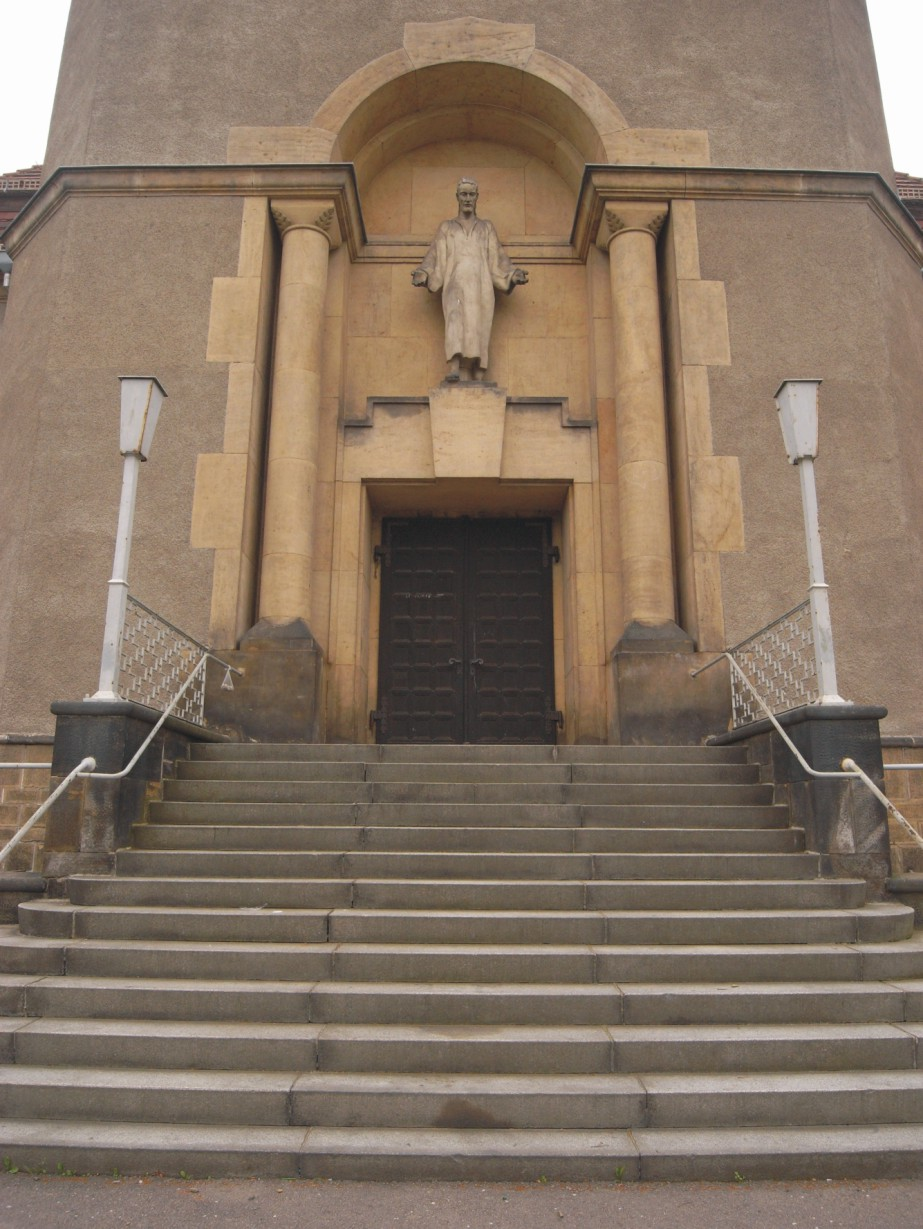

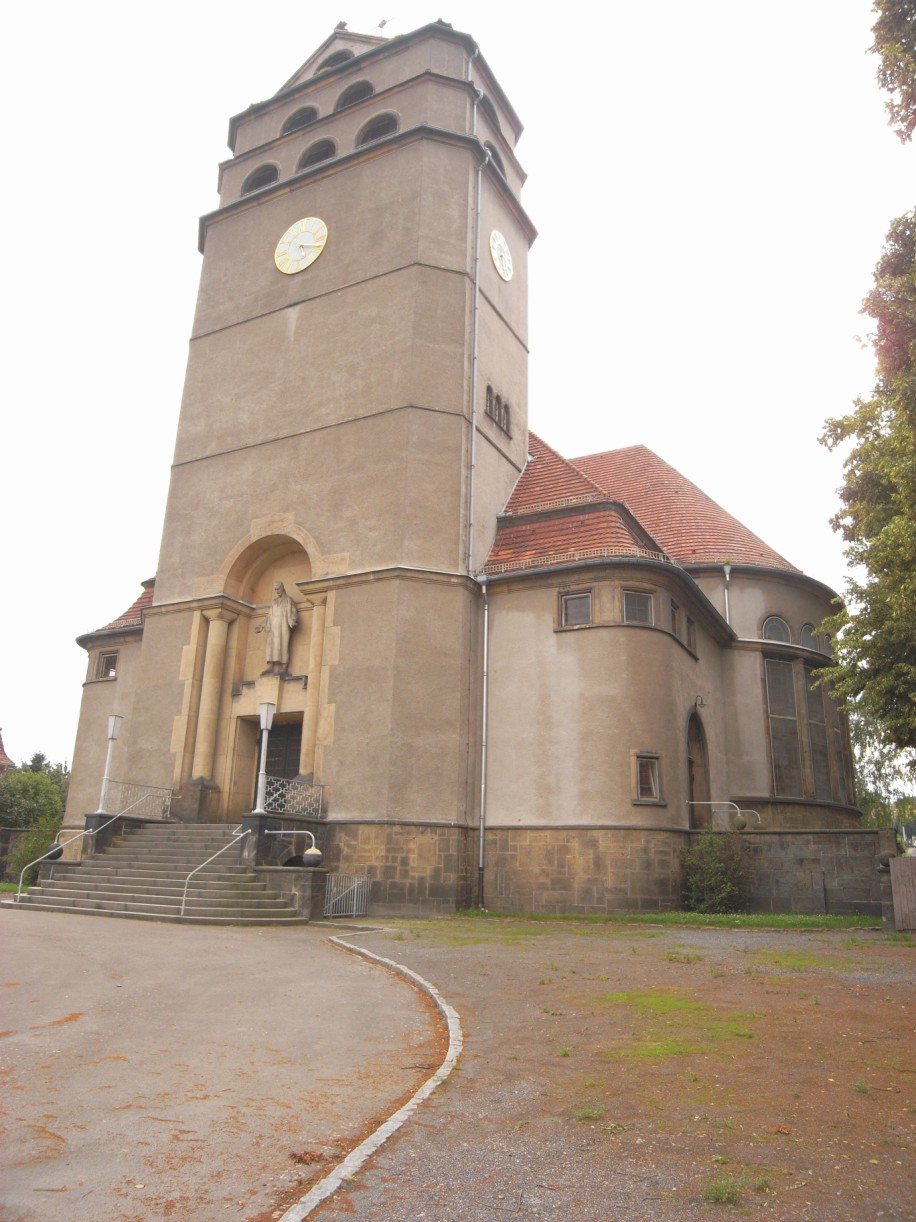
- 1926: Fallen Soldier – Gefallener Soldat, plastic, monumental sculpture, Greiz, Greiz Park, Rotunda
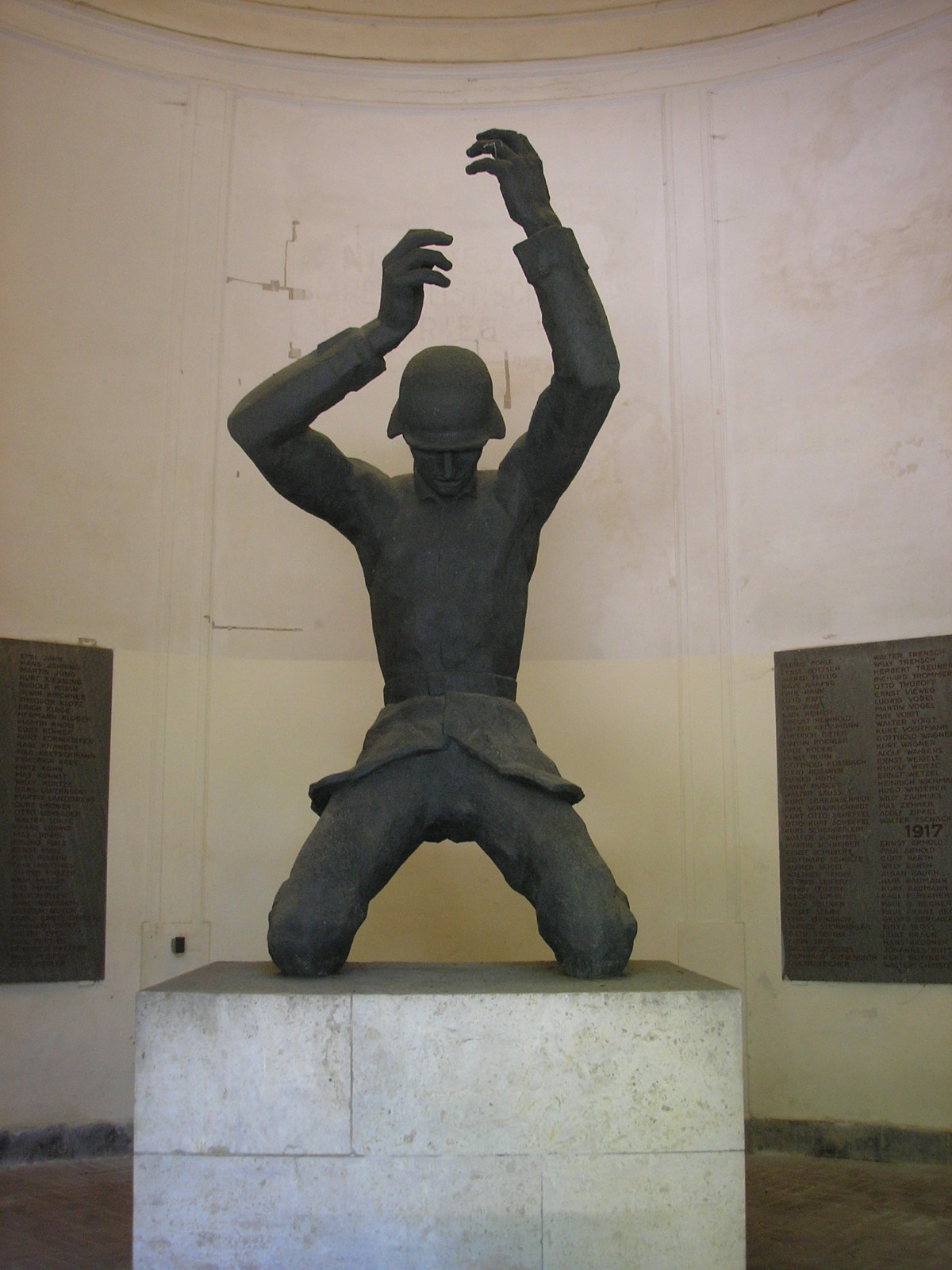

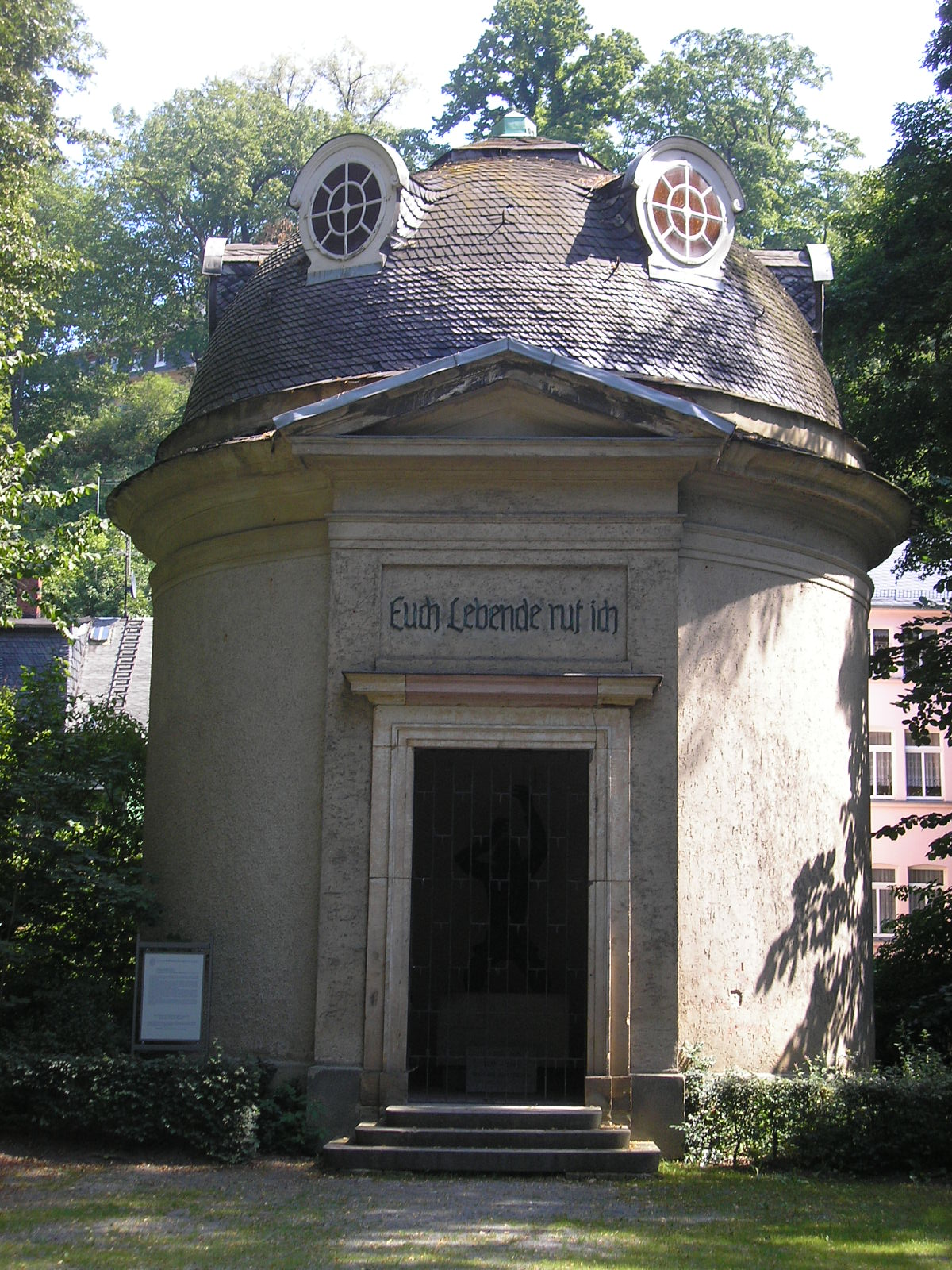
- 1929/31: Hygiene – Hygieia, Dresden, German Hygiene Museum, restored in 1992 by the Dresden sculptor Wilhelm Landgraf (badly damaged by the bombing of Dresden in 1945, the remains were cast in 1952).
- 1931: Minerva, Heidelberg, Heidelberg University
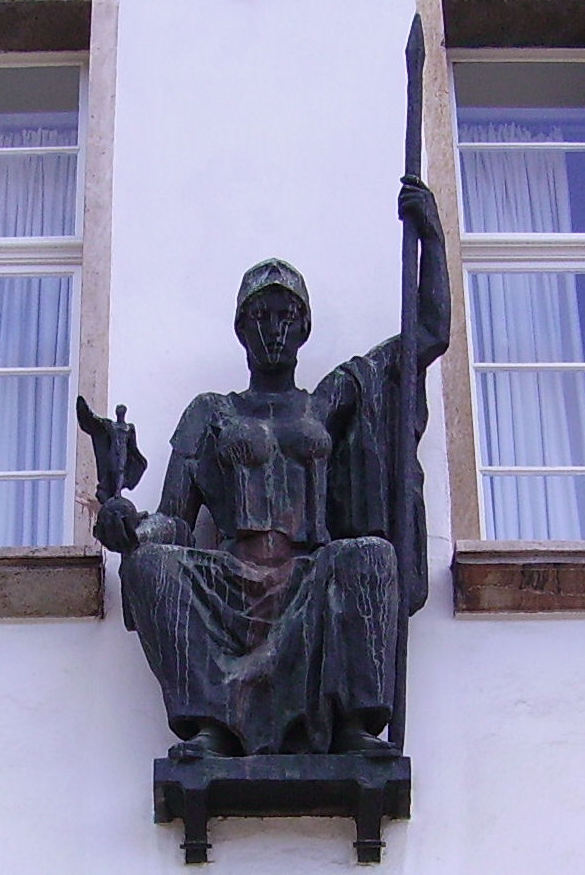

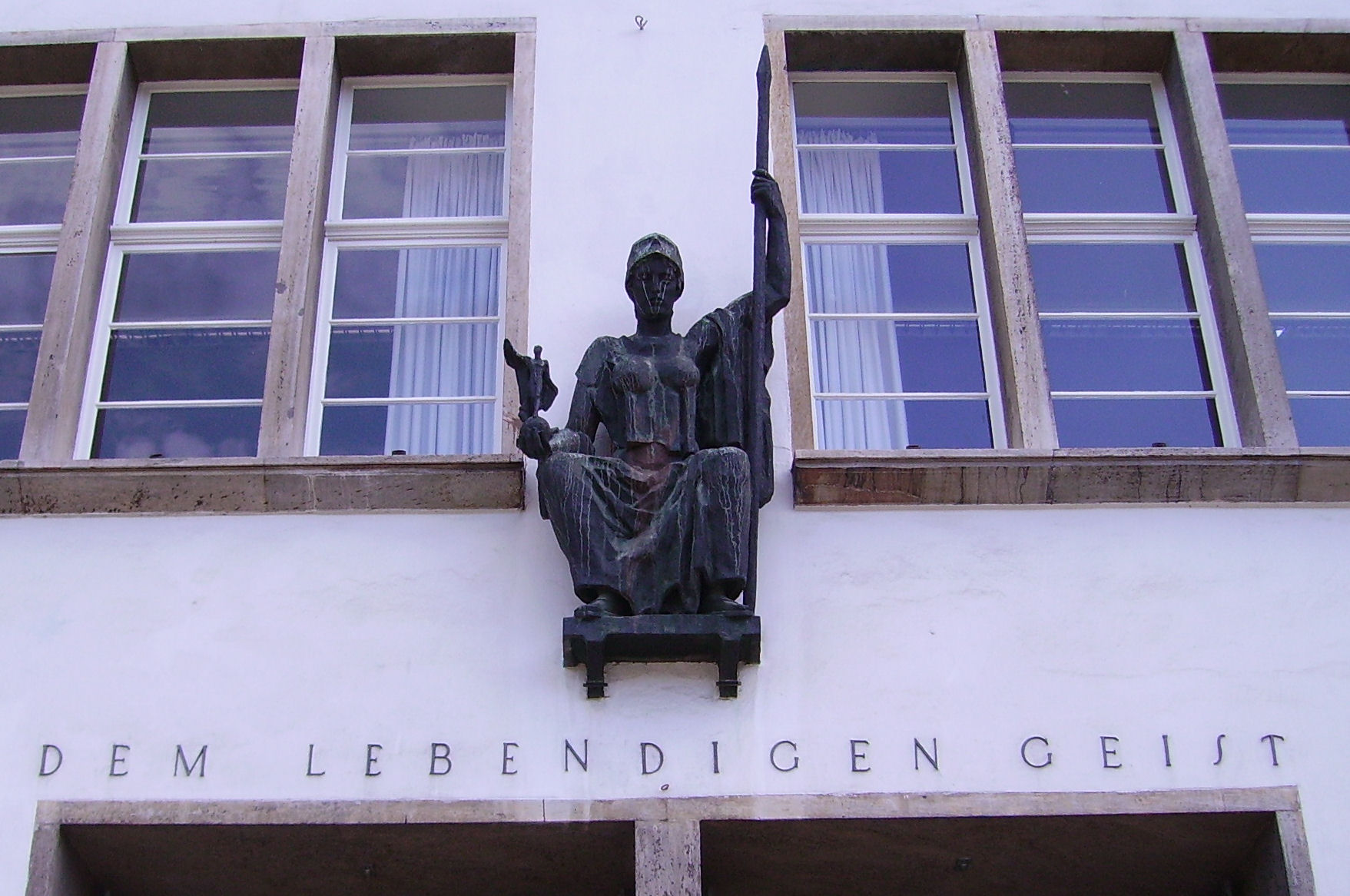
- 1935/37: The Discus Throwers – Die Diskuswerfer, Berlin, Olympic Park, the former Reich Sports Field
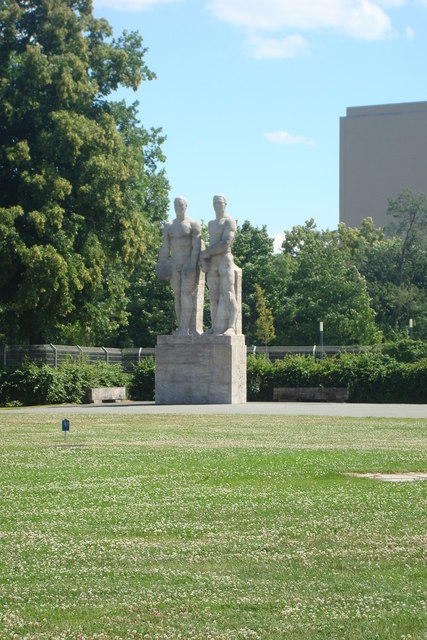
- 1935/37: The Relay Runners – Die Staffelläufer, Berlin, Olympic Park, the former Reich Sports Field
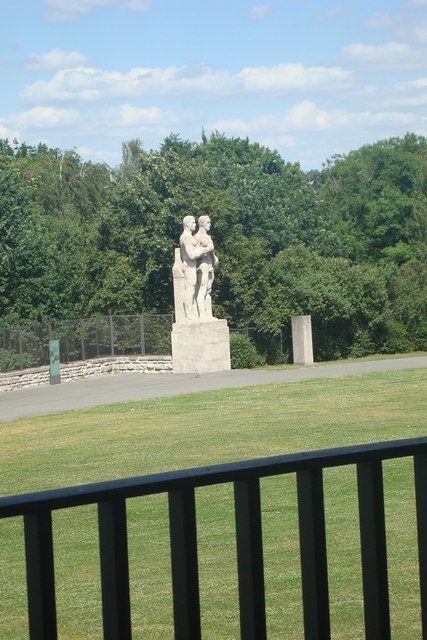

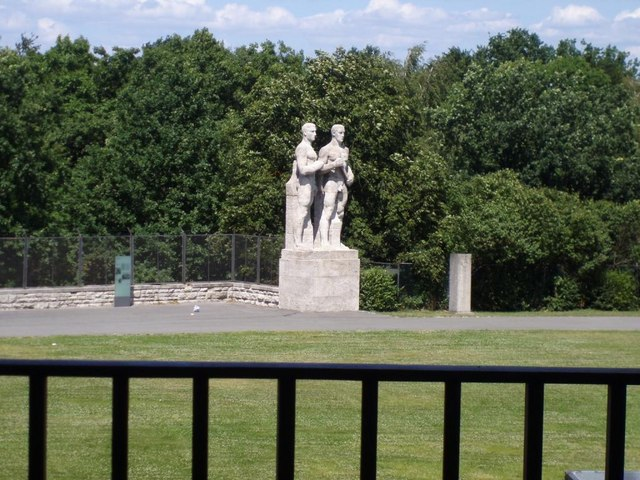

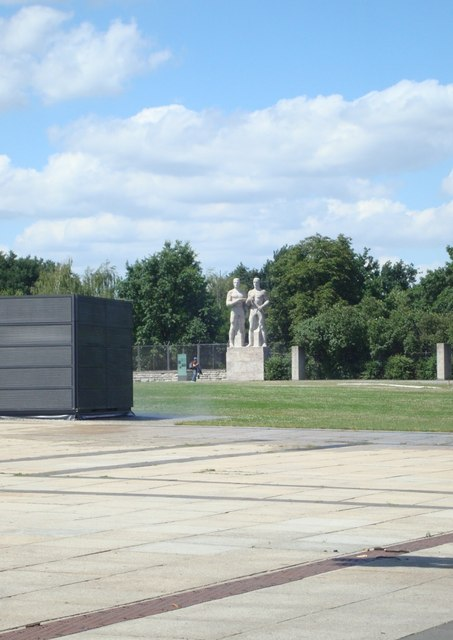
- 1938: The Genius of Flight – Fliegender Genius, frieze, Dresden, on the old building Luftgaukommando IV
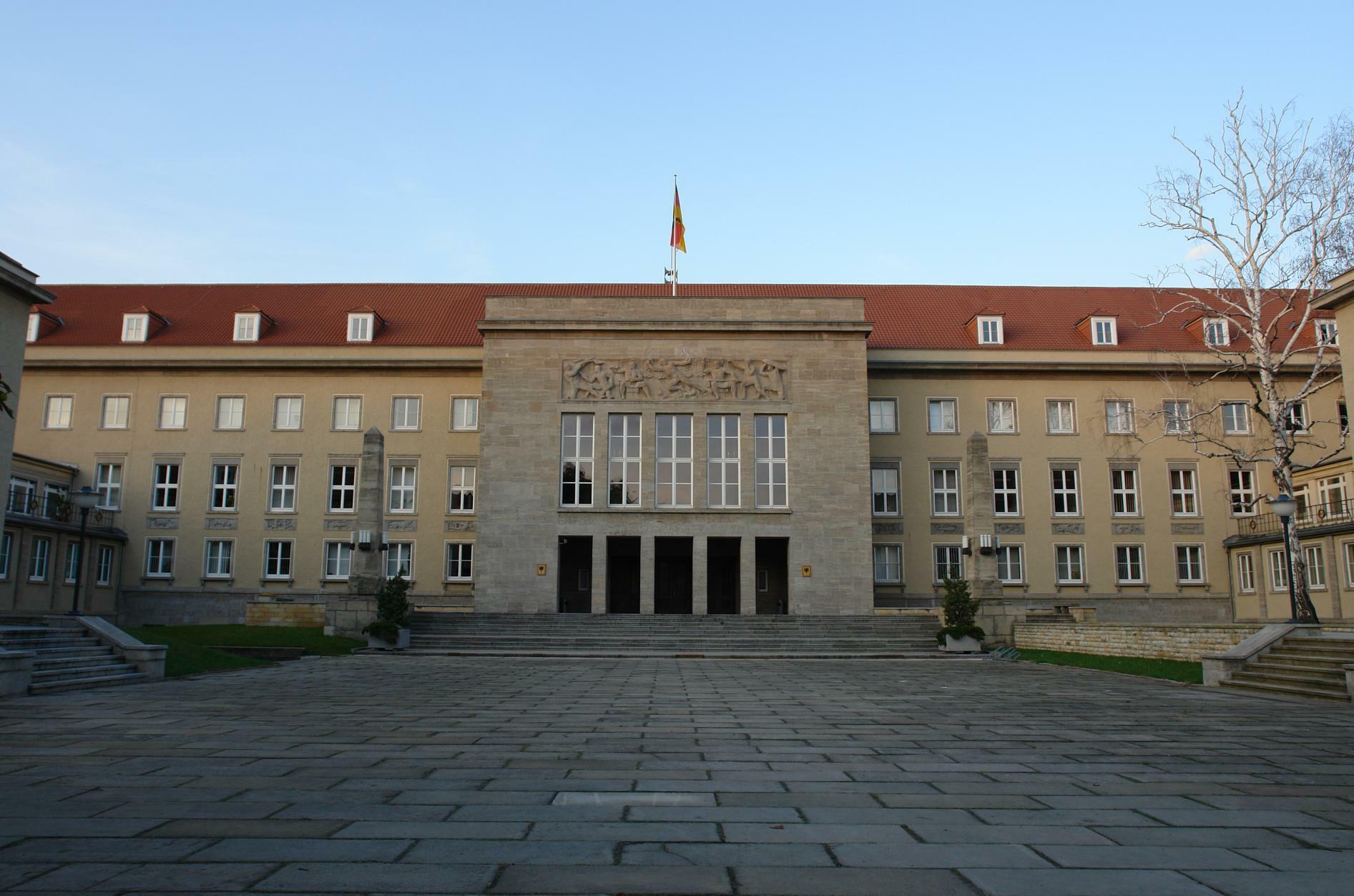

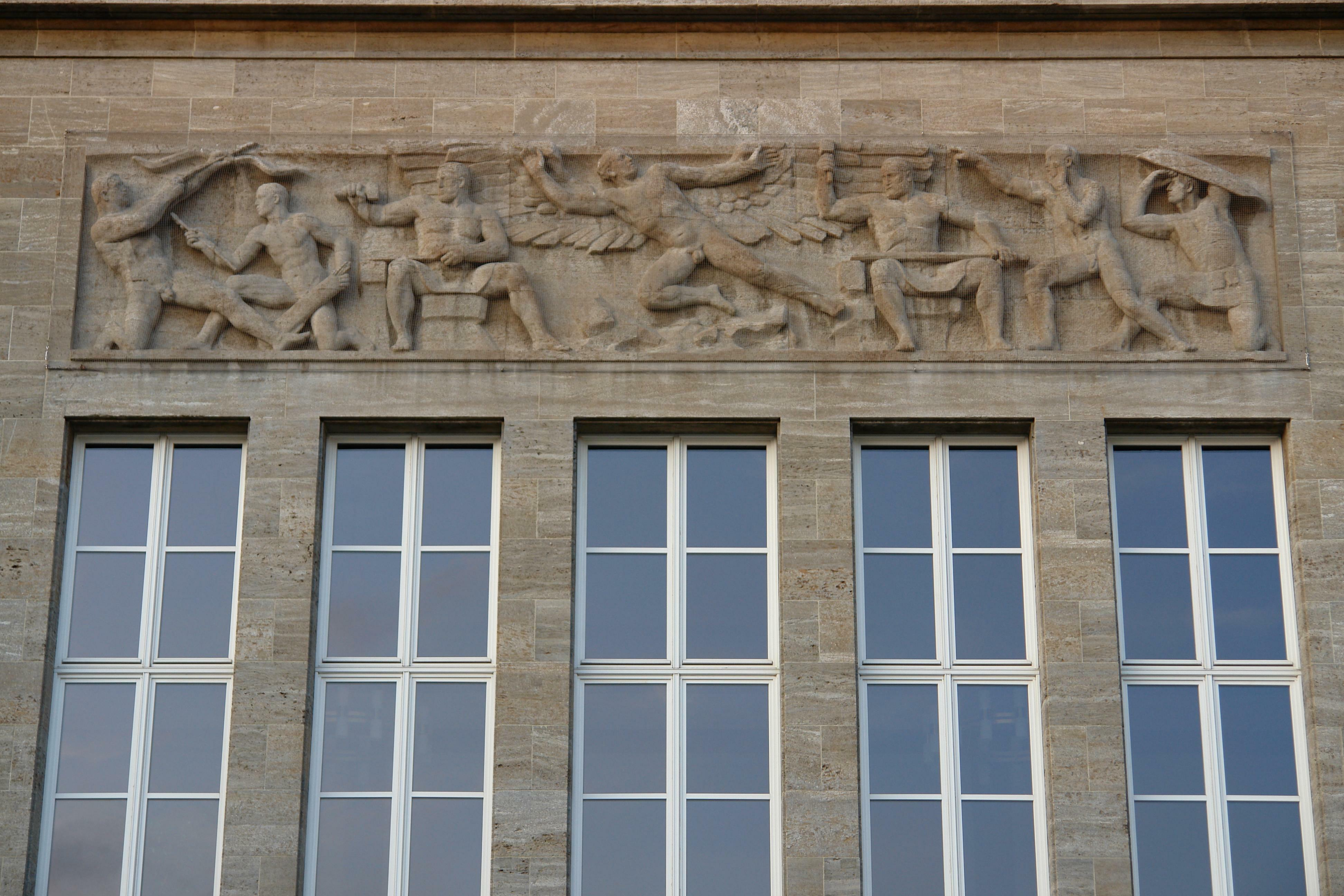

== Awards ==
- 1910: Villa Romana prize
- 1925: Doctor's Honorable Cause (University of Karlsruhe)
- 1953: Hans Thoma Prize
- 1957: Grand Cross 1st Class (Order of Merit of the Federal Republic of Germany)

== Exhibitions ==
- 1923: Badische Bildhauer (sculptor of Baden), Mannheim
- 1929: Deutscher Werkbund exhibition at Breslau
- 7 April–17 May 1937: Deutsche Baukunst und Deutsche Plastik (German Architecture and Sculpture). Group exhibition
- February–March 1943 in the Vienna Künstlerhaus, Greater German Reich (part of a Gesamtausst.)
- 1996/97: Karl Albiker, Georgenbau in the Dresden Palace

== Students ==
- Walter Becker (1893–1984)
- Friedrich Büschelberger (1904–1990)
- Hedwig Haller-Braus (1900–1989)
- Joseph Krautwald (1914–2003)
- Magdalene Kreßner (1899–1975)
- Hermann Rosa (1911–1981)
- Walter Schelenz (1903–1987)
- Kurt Schmitt (born 1903)
- Herbert Volwahsen (1906–1988)
- Wilhelm Landgraf (1913–1998)

== See also ==
- Nazi art

== Bibliography ==
- Christian Zentner, Friedemann Bedürftig (1991). The Encyclopedia of the Third Reich. Macmillan, New York. ISBN 0-02-897502-2
- Beate Eckstein: Im öffentlichen Auftrag: Architektur- und Denkmalsplastik der 1920er bis 1950er Jahre im Werk von Karl Albiker, Richard Scheibe und Josef Wackerle, Schriften zur Kunstgeschichte, Bd. 10, Hamburg 2005, ISBN 3-8300-1862-2

In Public: Monumental architecture and sculpture from the 1920s to 1950s by Karl Albiker, Richard Scheibe and Joseph Wackerle, Writings on art history, Vol. 10, Hamburg 2005, ISBN 3-8300-1862-2

- Sigrid Walther: Karl Albiker 1878–1961. Plastik, Zeichnungen. Katalog zur Ausstellung vom 9. November 1996–5. Januar 1997 im Georgenbau des Dresdner Schlosses. Neuer Sächsischer Kunstverein e.V., Deutsches Hygiene-Museum, Dresden 1996

Karl Albiker 1878–1961. Sculptures, Drawings. Catalog for the exhibition from 9 November 1996 to 5 January 1997 at Georgenbau at the Dresden Castle. New Saxon Art Association, Org., German Hygiene Museum, Dresden 1996

- Sigrid Walther: Eine Göttin für den "Tempel der Gesundheit". Die Plastik "Hygiena" von Karl Albiker im Deutschen Hygiene-Museum", Deutsches Hygiene-Museum, DZA Verlag für Kultur und Wissenschaft GmbH, 1996

A Goddess for the "Temple of Health". The sculpture "Hygiene" by Karl Albiker in the German Hygiene Museum, German Hygiene Museum, DZA Publishing House for Culture and Science, Ltd., 1996

- Karl Albiker. En: Ulrich Thieme, Felix Becker y a.: Allgemeines Lexikon der Bildenden Künstler von der Antike bis zur Gegenwart

General Encyclopedia of Artists from Antiquity to the Present, Vol. 1, Wilhelm Engelmann, Leipzig 1907, p. 227

- Reichshandbuch der Deutschen Gesellschaft – Das Handbuch der Persönlichkeiten in Wort und Bild, Erster Band, Deutscher Wirtschaftsverlag, Berlin 1930, S. 14, ISBN 3-598-30664-4

Manual of the German Reich – A manual of the personalities in word and image, first volume, Deutscher Wirtschaftsverlag, Berlin 1930, p. 14, ISBN 3-598-30664-4

- Wilhelm Rüdiger Hg.: Junge Kunst im Deutschen Reich. i. A. des Reichsstatthalters & Reichsleiters Baldur von Schirach. Ausst. Februar – März 1943 im Künstlerhaus Wien. Ehrlich & Schmidt, Wien 1943

Wilhelm Rüdiger ed.: Young Art of the German Reich. A. of Reichsstatthalters & Reichsleiters Baldur von Schirach. Exhibit. February–March 1943 in the Vienna Künstlerhaus. Ehrlich & Schmidt, Vienna 1943
