= Wilhelm Rietschel =

German sculptor (1911–1941)

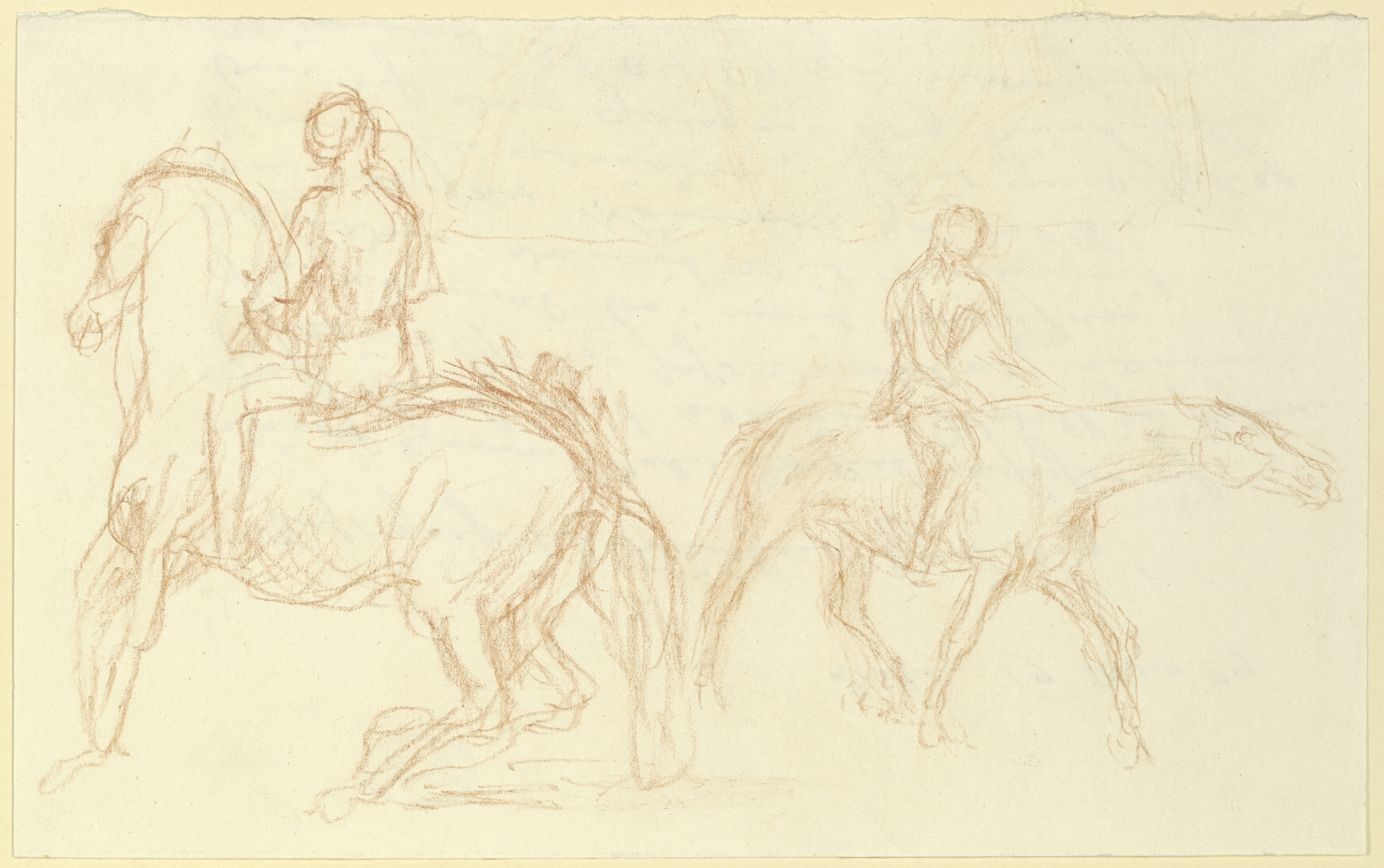
- Chalk sketch, undated
- Born: 26 January 1911; Wurzen, German Empire
- Died: 18 December 1941 (aged 30); Ropsha, Soviet Union

Otto Wilhelm Rietschel (26 January 1911 – 18 December 1941) was a German sculptor who exhibited his work at the 1936 Summer Olympics and was killed in action during the Siege of Leningrad.

== Life ==
Rietschel was the great-grandson of Ernst Rietschel. He studied art at the Dresden Academy of Fine Arts, and from 1936 onwards was a student of Richard Scheibe in Berlin. He made frequent trips to Italy during his studies. Rietschel's work was exhibited as part of the sculpture event in the art competition at the 1936 Summer Olympics.

In 1940, Rietschel was drafted into the Wehrmacht. He was killed in action during the Siege of Leningrad.
