= Technical Administration Building of Hoechst AG =

Building in Frankfurt designed by Peter Behrens

Coordinates: 50°5′41″N 8°32′4″E

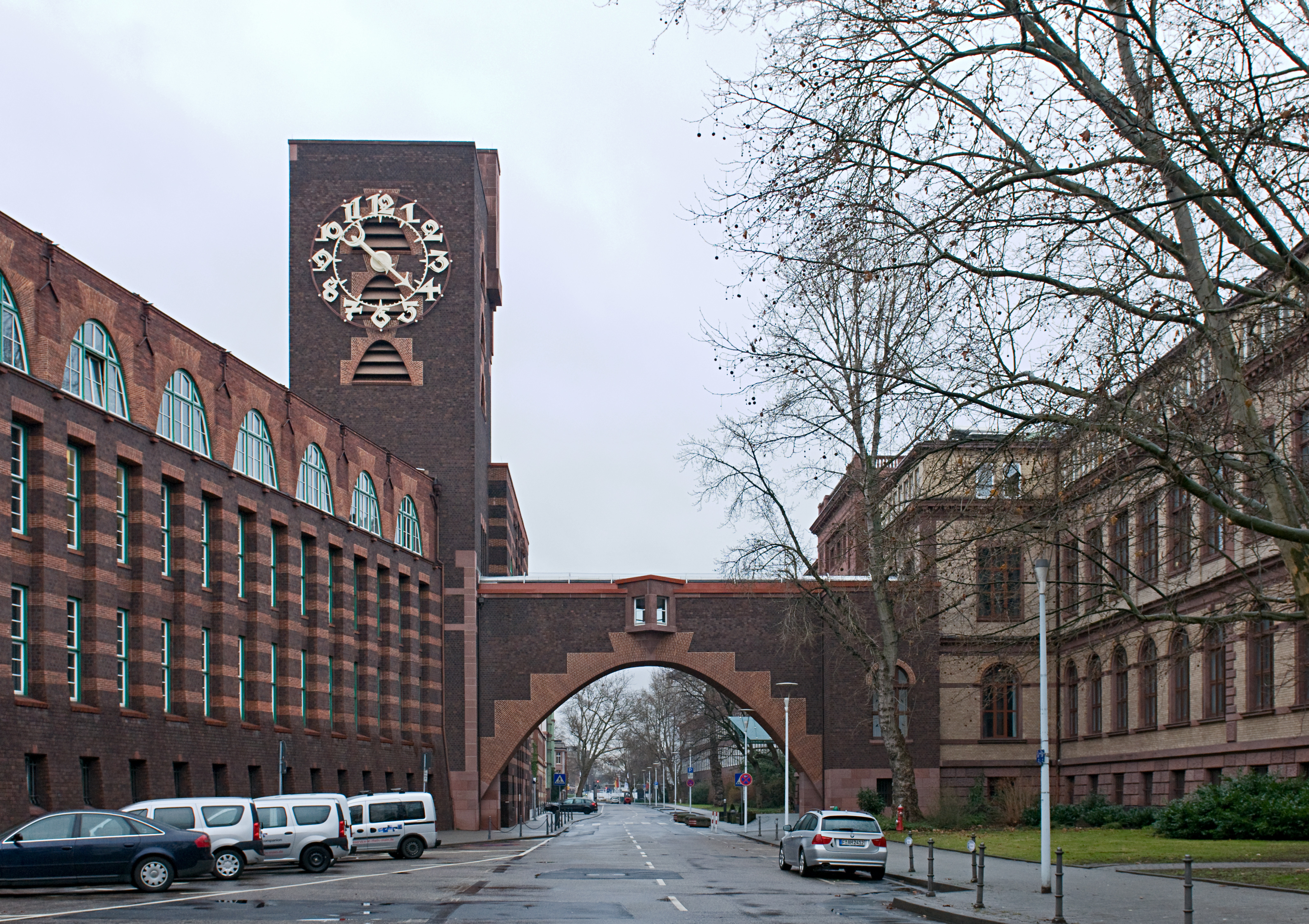
View from the west to the Behrens building with bridge and tower

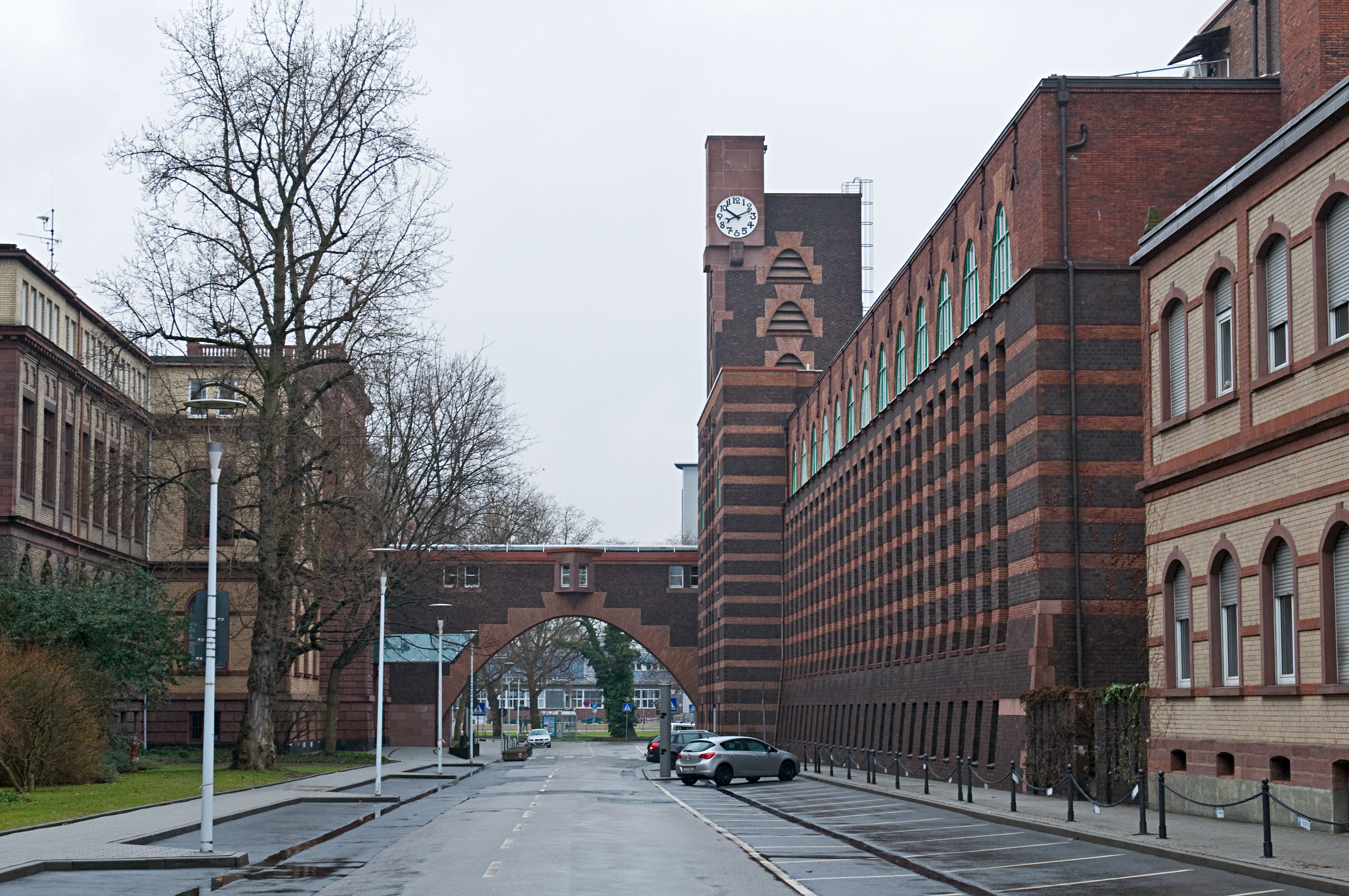
View from the east to the central office building (left) and the Behrens building with bridge and tower

The Technical Administration Building (German: Technisches Verwaltungsgebäude) of Hoechst AG is an expressionist office building by the architect Peter Behrens on the site of the former Hoechst company in Frankfurt-Höchst in the German state of Hesse. It is also referred to as the Peter Behrens Building (Peter-Behrens-Bau) by the operator of the Höchst Industrial Park, as the site of the former Hoechst works has been called since the merger of Hoechst AG and other companies and the subsequent abandonment of the traditional corporate name. The building had worldwide fame in a stylised form as part as the Hoechst company's tower and bridge (Turm und Brücke) logo from 1947 to 1997.

The related complex of buildings listed below is divided into two three-story administrative wings and a representative entrance area with its distinctive tower and bridge, linked to the building of the former central office (Hauptcomptoir) of the Hoechst company. It is accessible to the public only on specific days, because it is located in the cordoned-off area of the industrial park. Because of its importance for industrial heritage, it is part of the Route of Industrial Heritage of the Rhine-Main (Route der Industriekultur Rhein-Main).

== History ==
=== 1920 to 1924 - Design and construction ===
In June 1920, the Executive Board of Hoechst under its Director-General Adolf Haeuser, decided to merge its technical departments, which had been widely scattered, in a prestigious new building on the old Mainzer Landstrasse (now Brüningstraße) in the eastern part of the then independent city of Höchst am Main. The facade of the new administration building would be at least 150 metres long. A plot was selected for this building next to the former central office, built in 1892. On 21 August, a request was made to the Berlin-based architect Peter Behrens, who immediately prepared the first drafts, so that on 14 September, a contract was signed for the new technical offices of the dye works. On 31 December 1920, the building department was presented with a proposed design and in January demolition of older buildings on the plot began. At the end of 1921, the building's shell was largely completed, but further work on the building was delayed. In particular, the lack of building materials during the years of hyperinflation and the occupation of the Höchst works by French troops on 5 May 1923 brought construction to a standstill at times until the introduction of the German Rentenmark in April 1924. The formal opening of the monumental office building was held on 6 June 1924.

=== 1925-1945—IG Farben ===
The new building soon lost importance as, on 12 November 1925, the Hoechst dye works was merged with other chemical companies to form IG Farben. In 1930, the administration of the then fourth-largest company in the world was transferred to the new IG Farben Building in Frankfurt's West End, designed by Hans Poelzig. The Höchst factory declined further in the next few years. In the 1930s several alterations were made inside the building as a result. Thus, the aisles of the big exhibition hall on the ground floor were converted into a telephone exchange for the factory and warehouses. The large conference room on the first and second floor, known as the marble hall (Marmorsaal), was divided into three offices.

The Second World War left the Höchst work largely undamaged. The site was only hit by bombs on 29 June 1940 during an air raid, which devastated the lecture hall in the northern building. It was repaired during the war in a simplified form and renovated in 1951 in the style of the 1950s.

=== After the Second World War ===
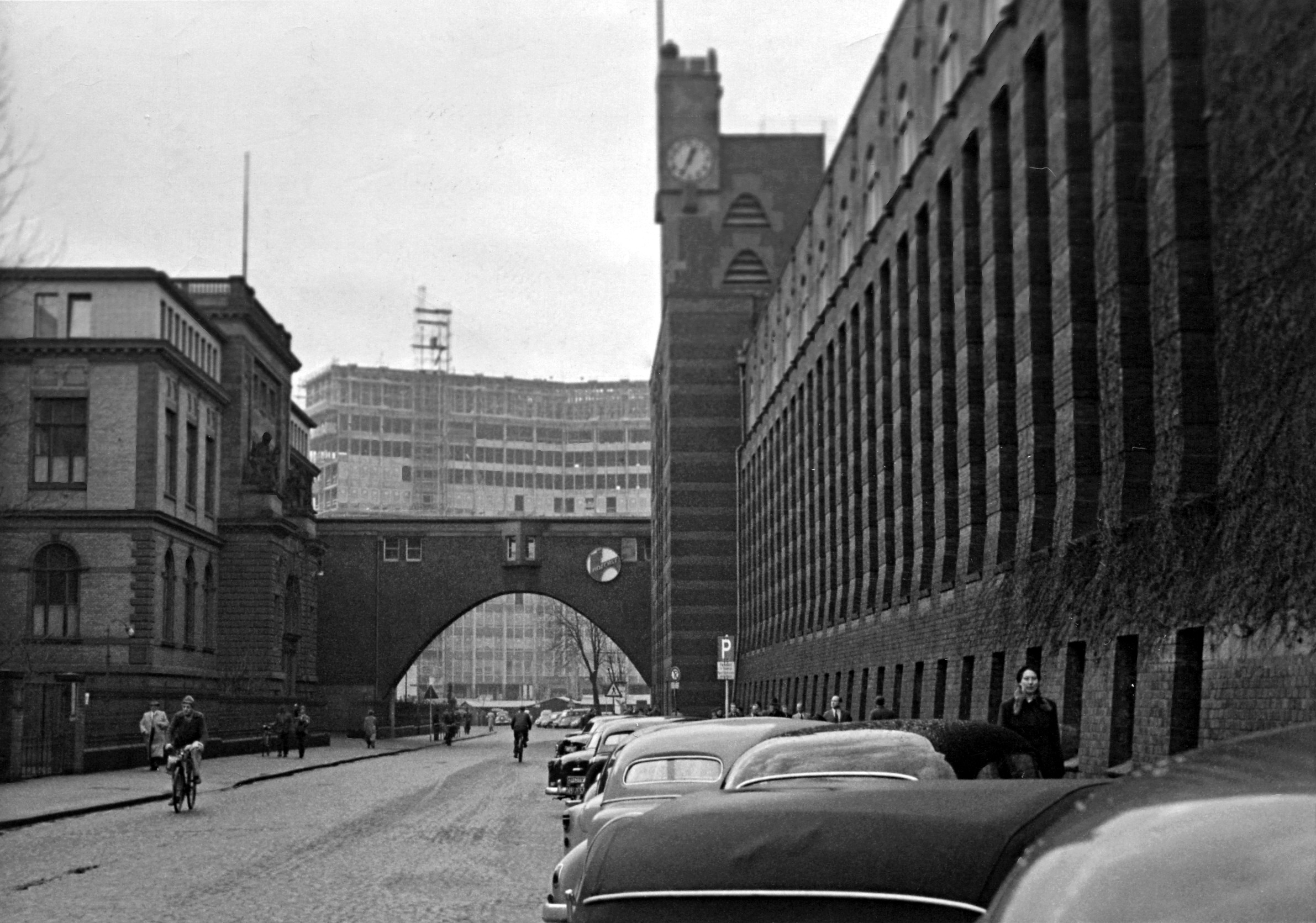
Technical Administration Building in the mid 1950s

In June 1952, IG Farben was released from Allied control. The company was liquidated and divided into eleven successor companies, including Hoechst AG. In 1954, Brüningstraße adjacent to the building was closed to public traffic.

In 1965 all buildings at the Hoechst works were given new names in a uniform style. Since then the building built by Behrens has been called C 770 and the central office building opposite has been called D 706. The building built by Behrens became the location of the personnel department.

=== Infraserv ===
The conversion of Hoechst AG into a holding company began in 1994. Since 1 January 1998, the Behrens building has been owned by Infraserv GmbH & Co. Höchst KG, the operator of the Höchst industrial park (Industriepark Höchst), which was spun off Hoechst AG. An extensive restoration of the Behrens building began in 1998. Its facade was cleaned and repaired, all the windows and the building's services were replaced. The restoration was completed in 2002. In 2005, the auditorium was modernised and the Marble Hall on the second floor was renovated, with the building's original wooden panelling, which had been covered, now largely exposed. The exhibition hall, which had been heavily modified by alterations, was renovated in 2007 and restored as much as possible to its original state.

The Behrens building is now the headquarters of the management of Infraserv Höchst and the Hoechst pension fund. The building is not accessible to the public, but can be seen as part of special guided tours on several days each year.

== Building Specifications ==
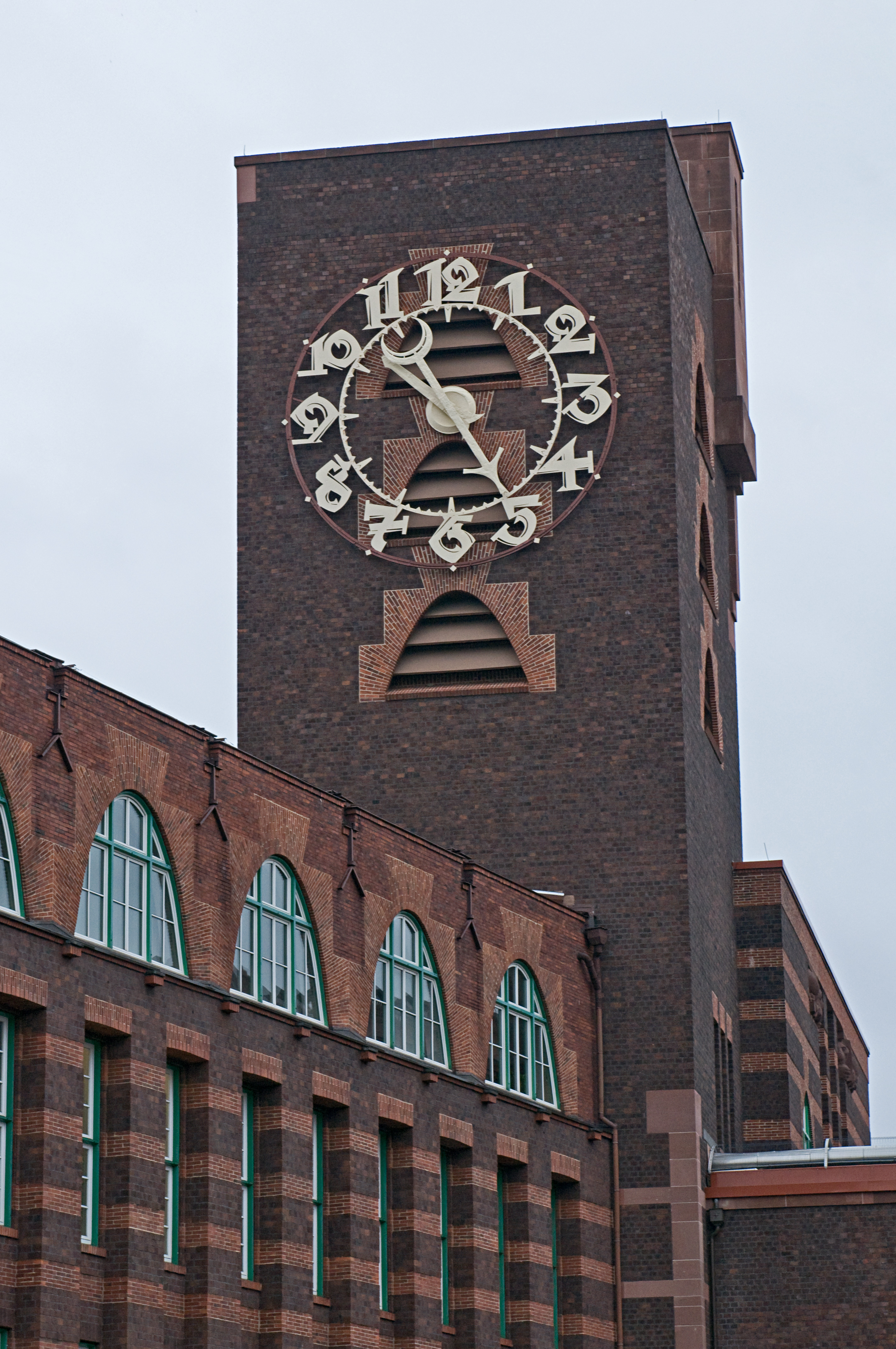
Tower of the Behrens building with its distinctive clock

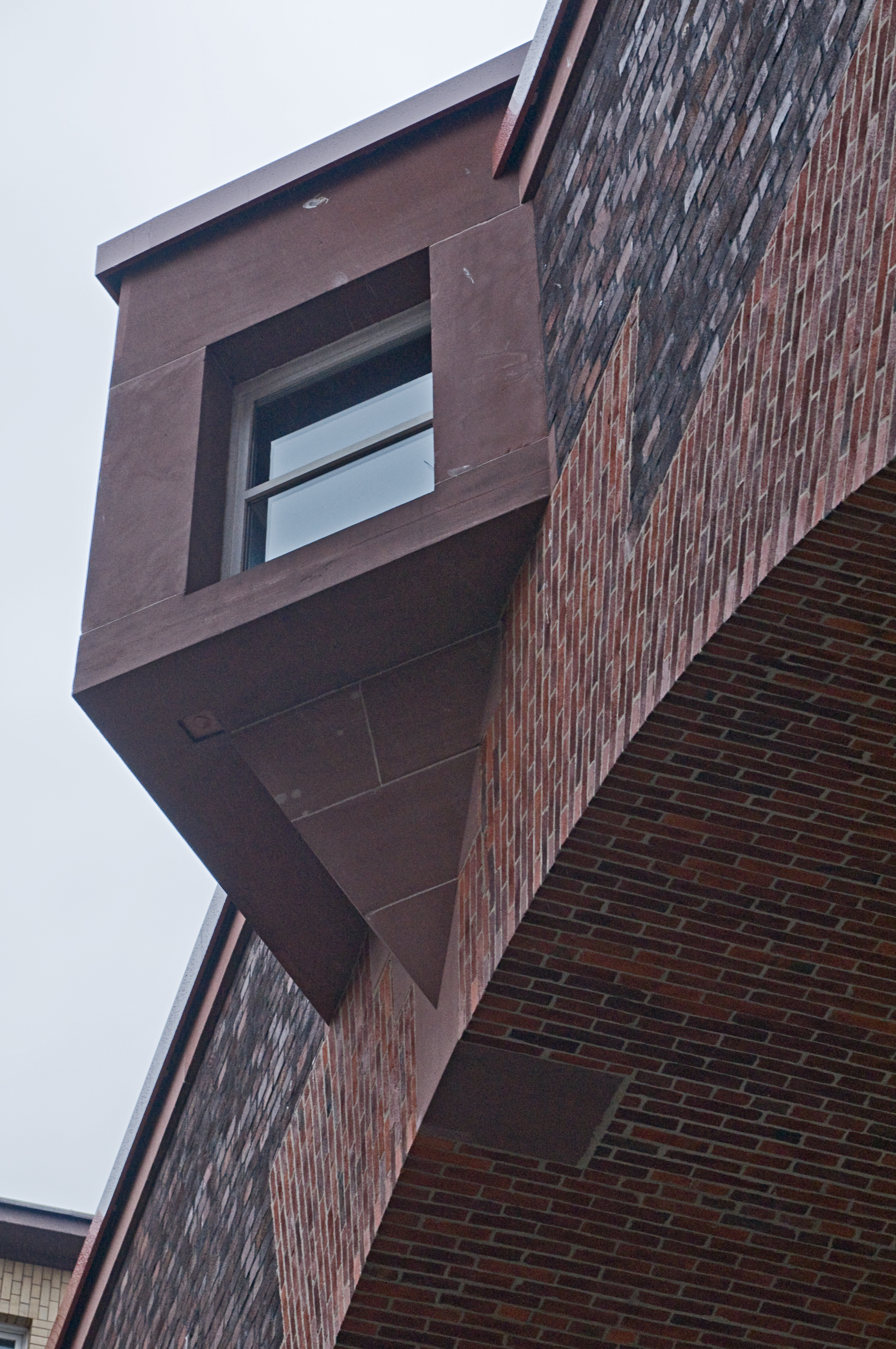
Architectural detail of the bridge

=== Basics ===
The building's association with brick expressionism is reflected in both the external and internal architecture and can be recognised from the details. Central themes are the colours that refer to the client and the crystal motifs that can be seen as ornaments in the light sources, such as windows and lamps. The stained glass windows also quote the paintings of the De Stijl artistic movement. While Peter Behrens had extensive experience in construction for industry and government, the importance of craft work can also be seen in his work after the First World War. This meant that many components such as door handles, railings or single windows were finished by hand.

=== Facade ===
For cost reasons, and in contrast to the historicist central office building lying opposite, the technical administration building was built completely of brick. Behrens avoided a monotonous facade to the 185-metre long building complex by the fact that he used different coloured bricks and he divided the long building into three sections.

The two wings of the office building converge at an obtuse angle from the entrance building, which has a fortress-like wall at its base, tapering towards the top. The windows are inset in sockets and are square and relatively small. This vertical dominance is broken by single horizontal friezes of bright broken masonry. The upper floors are set back and are built with parabolic-shaped windows, reminiscent of Gothic arches, as a defining element.

=== Bridge, tower and mid-section ===
The bridge and the tower are the two key elements of the complex. The middle section contains the main entrance and main staircase of the building. Its facade resembles that of the wings of the building, but has more emphasis on vertical elements. While topped with parabolic windows, the middle section has narrow columns of window. The tower dominates the middle section. In the upper area are the openings for chimes and a clock. Despite the existence of the bells chimes, it was never completed for cost reasons. Originally it was intended to signal the change of shift to the workers in the dye works with the sounds of Richard Wagner's Lohengrin. The tower was connected to the central office building built in 1892 with a masonry arch bridge over Brüningstraße that reflects the theme of the parabolic windows of the upper floor.

The main entrance in the central block is built very cautiously as a representative feature. The three doors are recessed into the window gaps. Above the entrance there are two stone lions carved with the arms of the Meister, Lucius & Brüning company, which developed into the Hoechst company.

=== Interior Design ===
==== Entrance, main hall and staircase exhibition ====
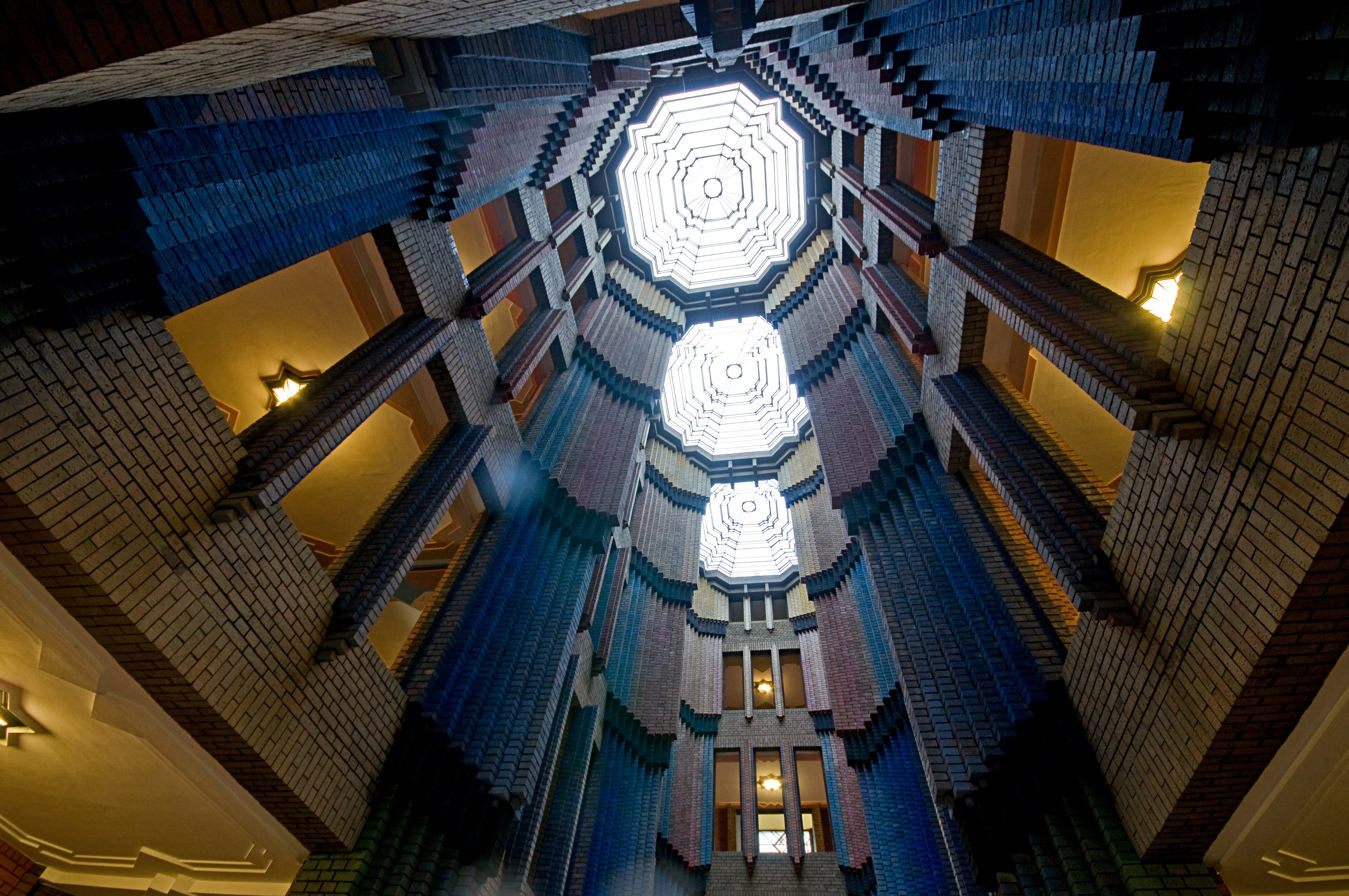
Vertical view of the entrance hall

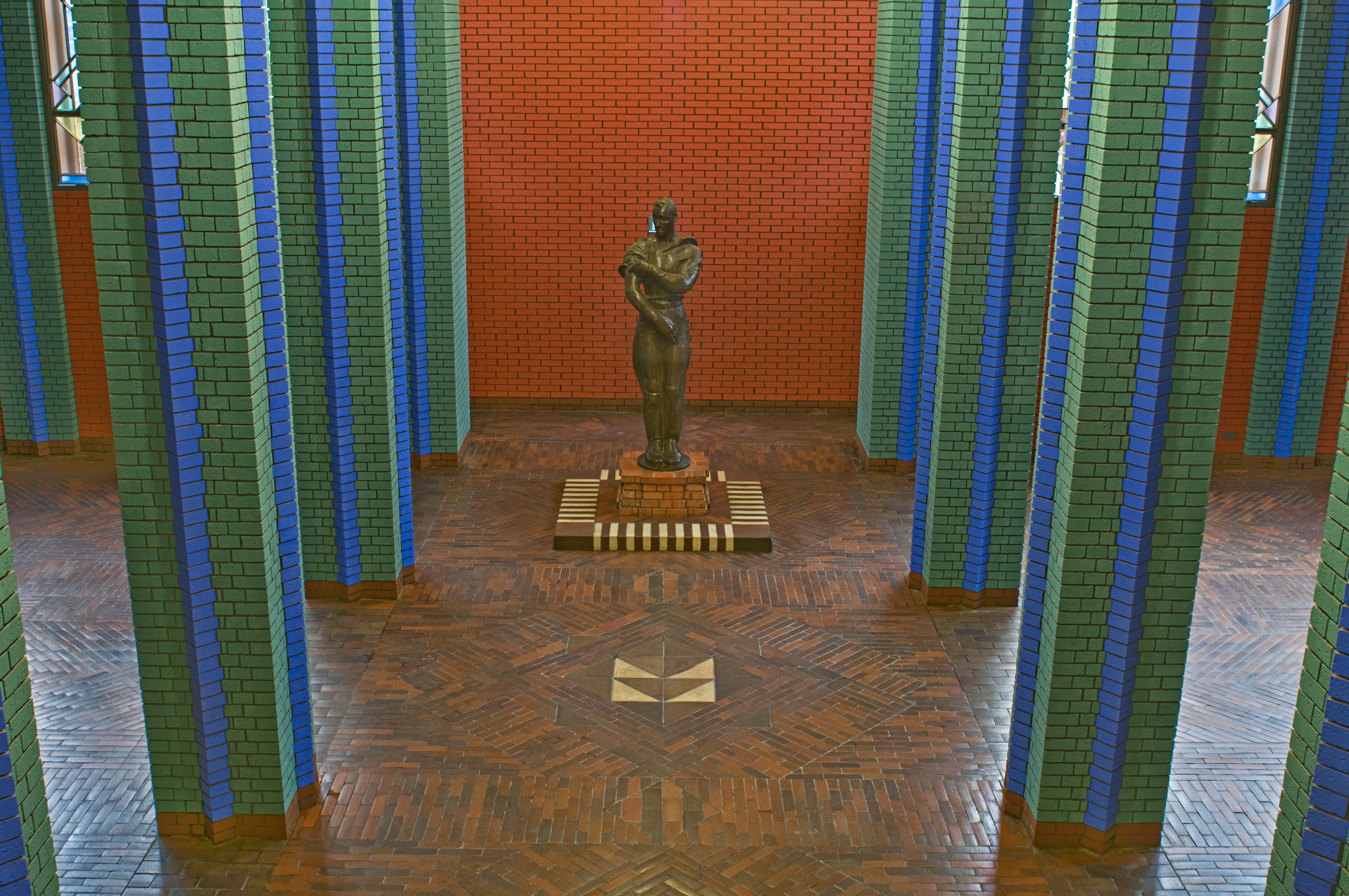
Exhibition space with the workers' statue

The main hall can be compared to the nave of a basilica that is connected to the entrance via a transept. The transept, which is the passage from the three entrances to the hall, is very low and dark, and thus forms a contrast to the impressive main hall.

The hall occupies the entire height of the central building and is illuminated by large windows in the ceiling. Its height of 15 metres is stretched visually by several architectural tools. The individual storeys of the peripheral course are lower at the top and the windows are narrower. The only ornament in this hall is the bare masonry of the pillars that form a frame to the octagonal ceiling windows above and taper down. An alternate colour scheme counteracts the massiveness of the upper very broad masonry: the lowest clinker bricks are green, followed by blue, red, purple, orange and finally yellow.

It was designed as a three-aisled hall, with the seven-metre high ceiling supported by six pillars, and is illuminated through large, coloured glass windows on three sides. This architecture, as well as the large windows appropriate for the lighting was changed over time in many cases. Already in the 1930s the area was transformed into a memorial for those killed as a result of World War II. In 1938, the aisles were separated by concrete floors and divided into several rooms, the first as a switchboard for the works and since the 1960s rooms have served as a storeroom and conference rooms. A statue of a worker with roll up sleeves, created by Richard Scheibe, was the only original feature that remained in the exhibition hall.

From June to December 2007, the hall was restored to its original form, with the windows and walls rebuilt to the original design. The bright colours of the new brick stand out clearly from the original bricks of the entrance hall, which have faded over the decades, conveying an impression of Behren's original plans.

The main stairs are located at the ends of the nave. They run over the balustrade of the mezzanine floors of the main hall to the third floor. The main staircase now contains an elevator that goes up to the fourth floor. The window facing the courtyard are painted in the colours of the mezzanine.

==== Lecture hall and marble hall ====
The auditorium of the Behrens building was located on the first floor above the showroom. The original hall was designed in accordance with the overall concept and had elaborate wood panelling. After it was burned during the Second World War, it was rebuilt in the 1950s in the style of that time.

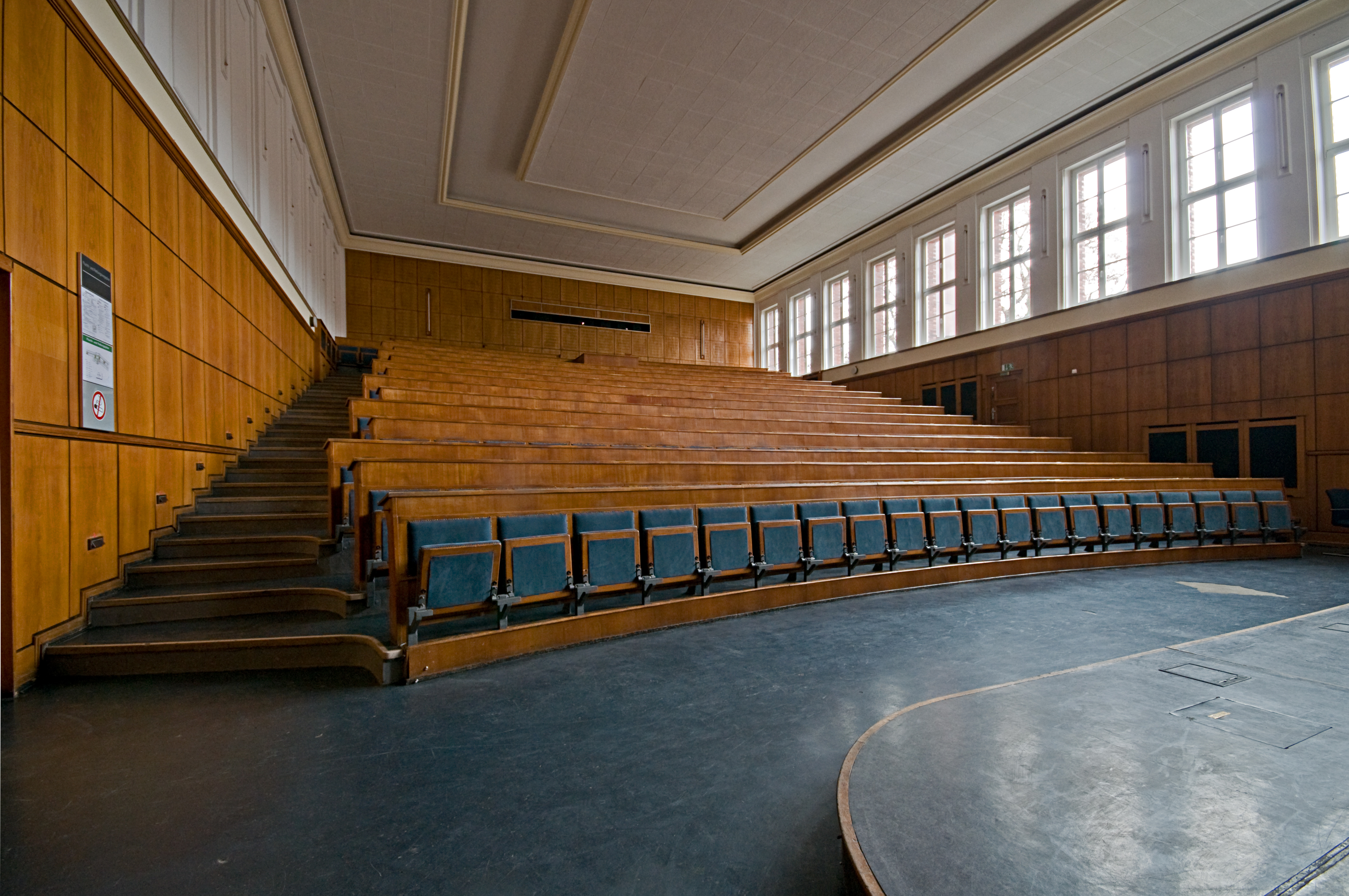
View of the lecture hall

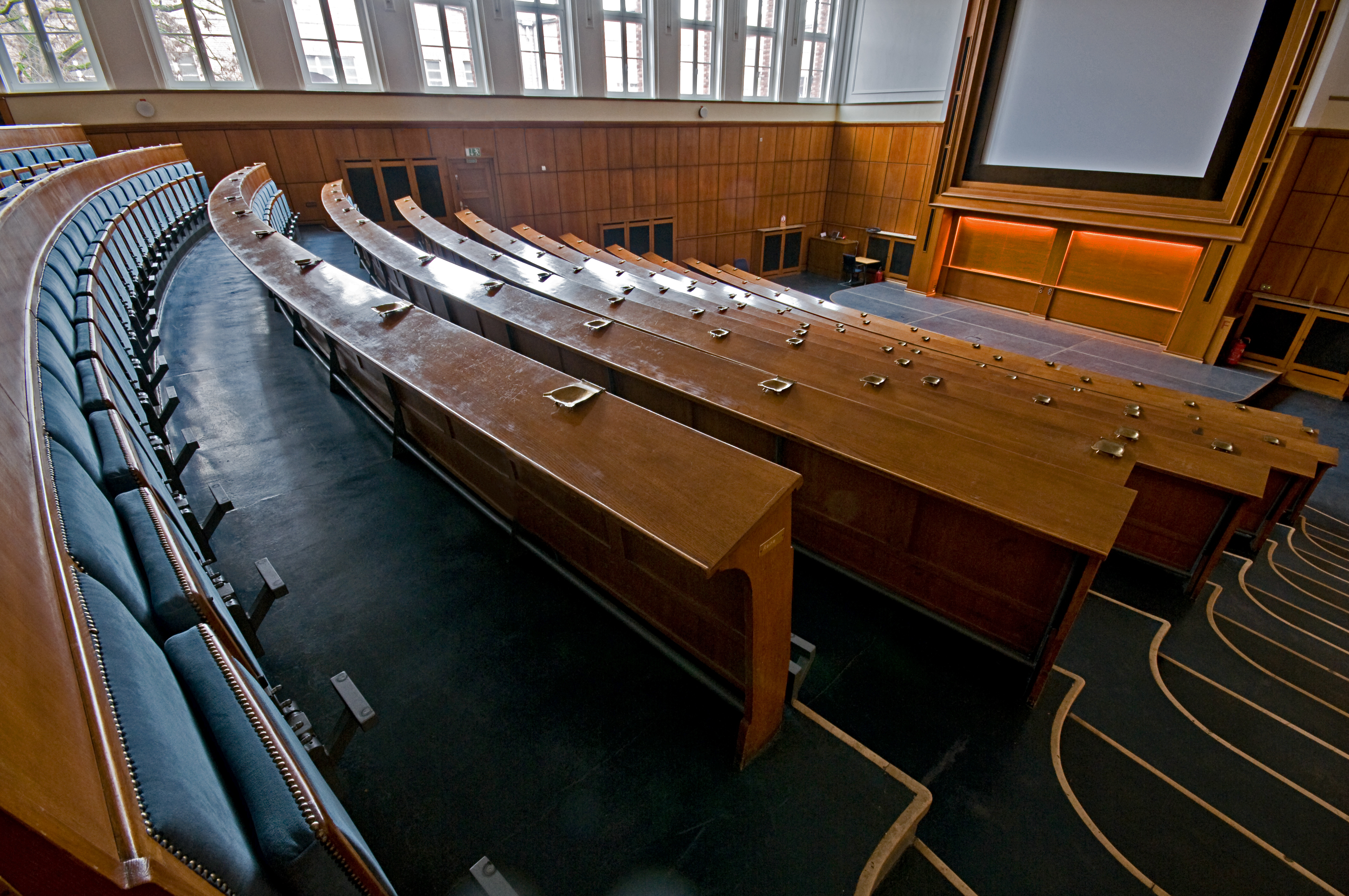
Looking down from the top of the lecture hall

Opposite, above the entrance, was a hall known as the Marble Hall (Marmorsaal). It owes its name to its wall cladding of travertine, which is reminiscent of marble. A particular feature was the candlestick, which was also designed by Behrens. An exit to the bridge linked this space directly with the central office building opposite. As part of a reorganisation, the Marble Hall was divided into three separate offices and the candlestick also disappeared.

==== Office suites and courtyard ====
The office wings are close to the central structure. They are situated around a courtyard, which has walls that are veneered with white bricks so that incidental light is reflected up the surrounding corridors. The transitions to the offices are more simply built than the representative main hall. The dominant material is wood. In the office wings there are two small adjoining staircases at the end of the east wing and at the centre of the west wing. In both stairwells a paternoster lift operates and in the west wing there is also a freight elevator. In the north-west wing of the Behrens building there were originally the offices of the drafting rooms of the technical departments. Later, the rooms were divided into numerous individual rooms.

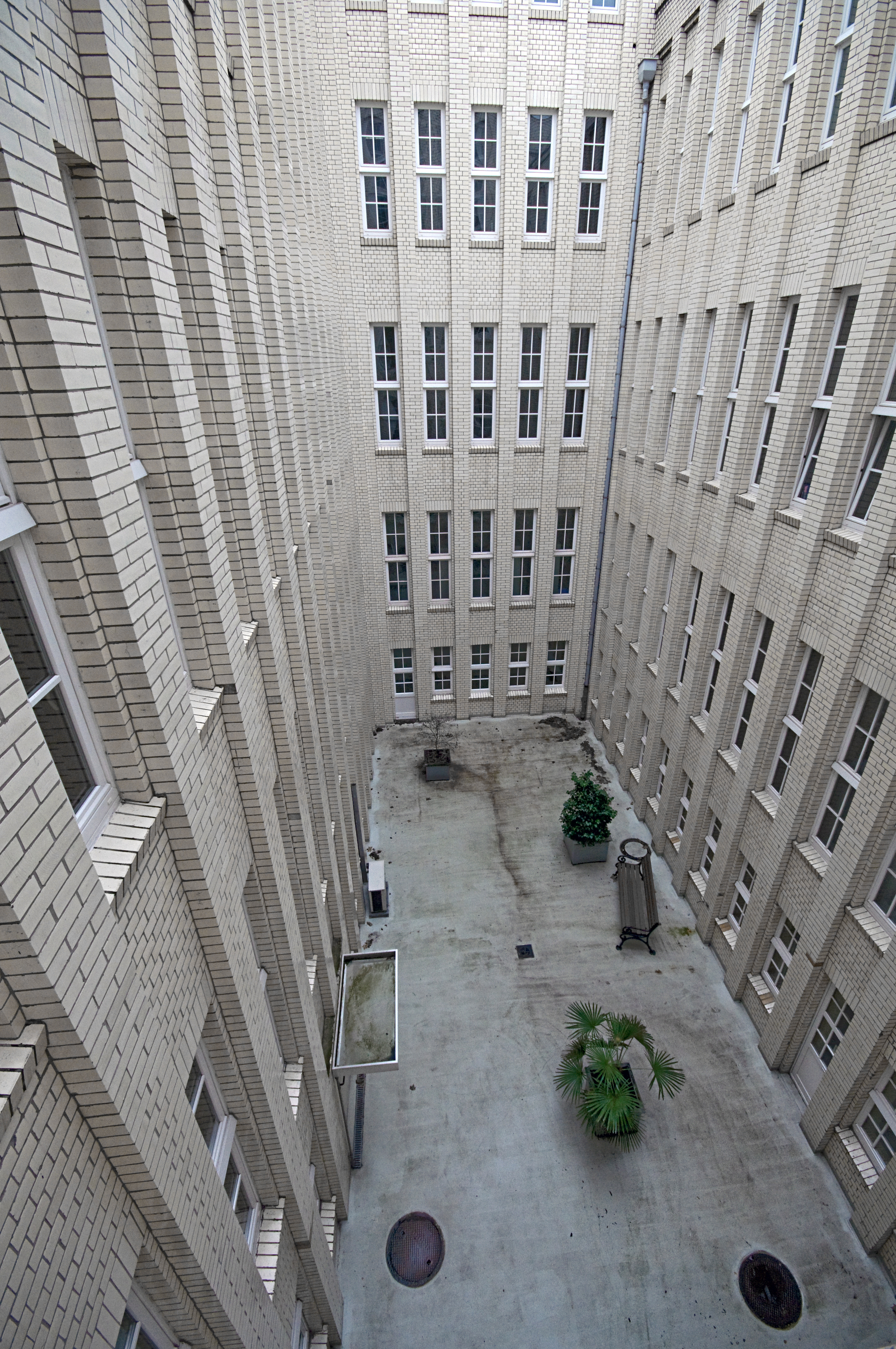
View of the courtyard

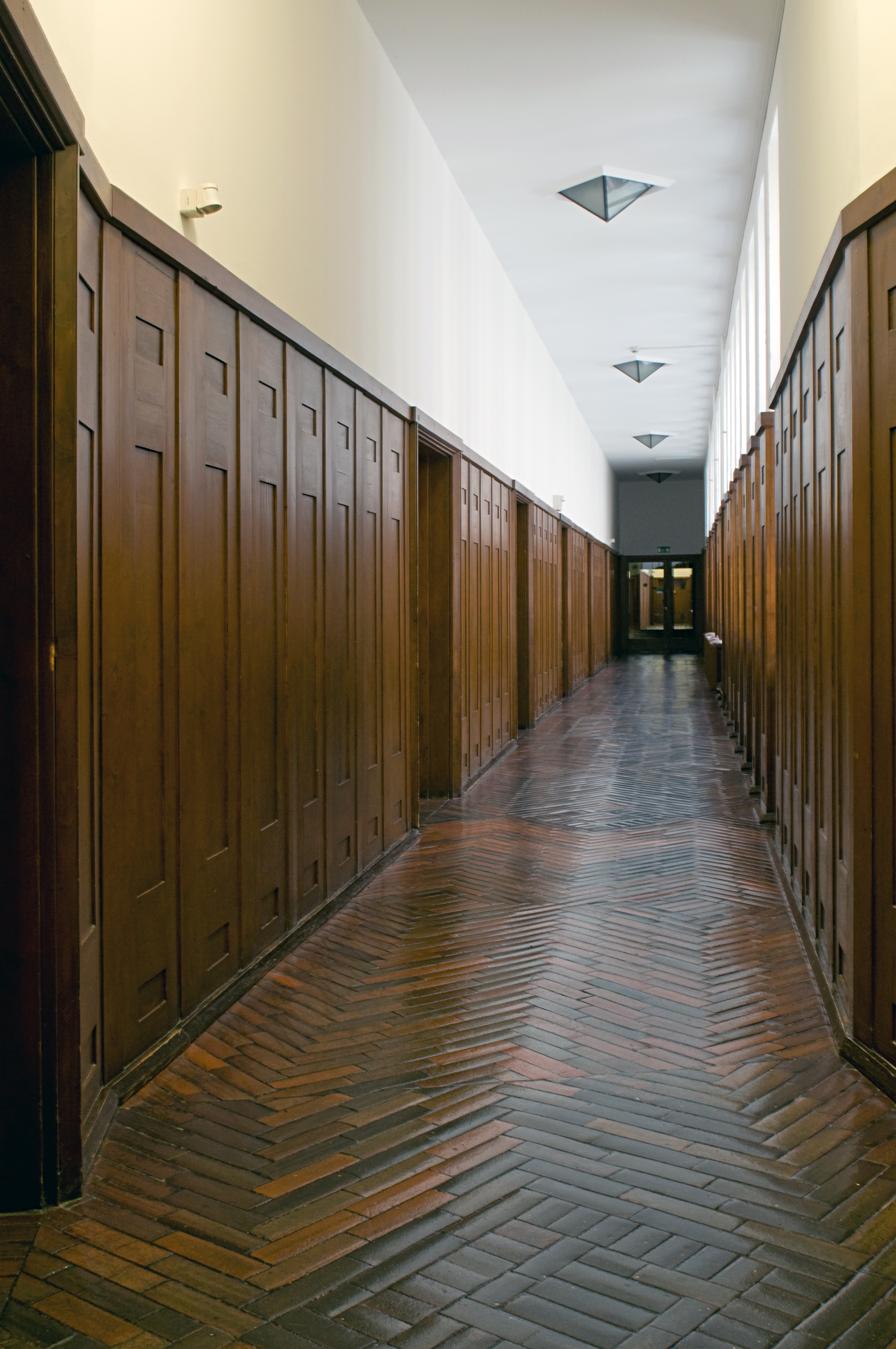
Wood-paneled interior corridor of the office building

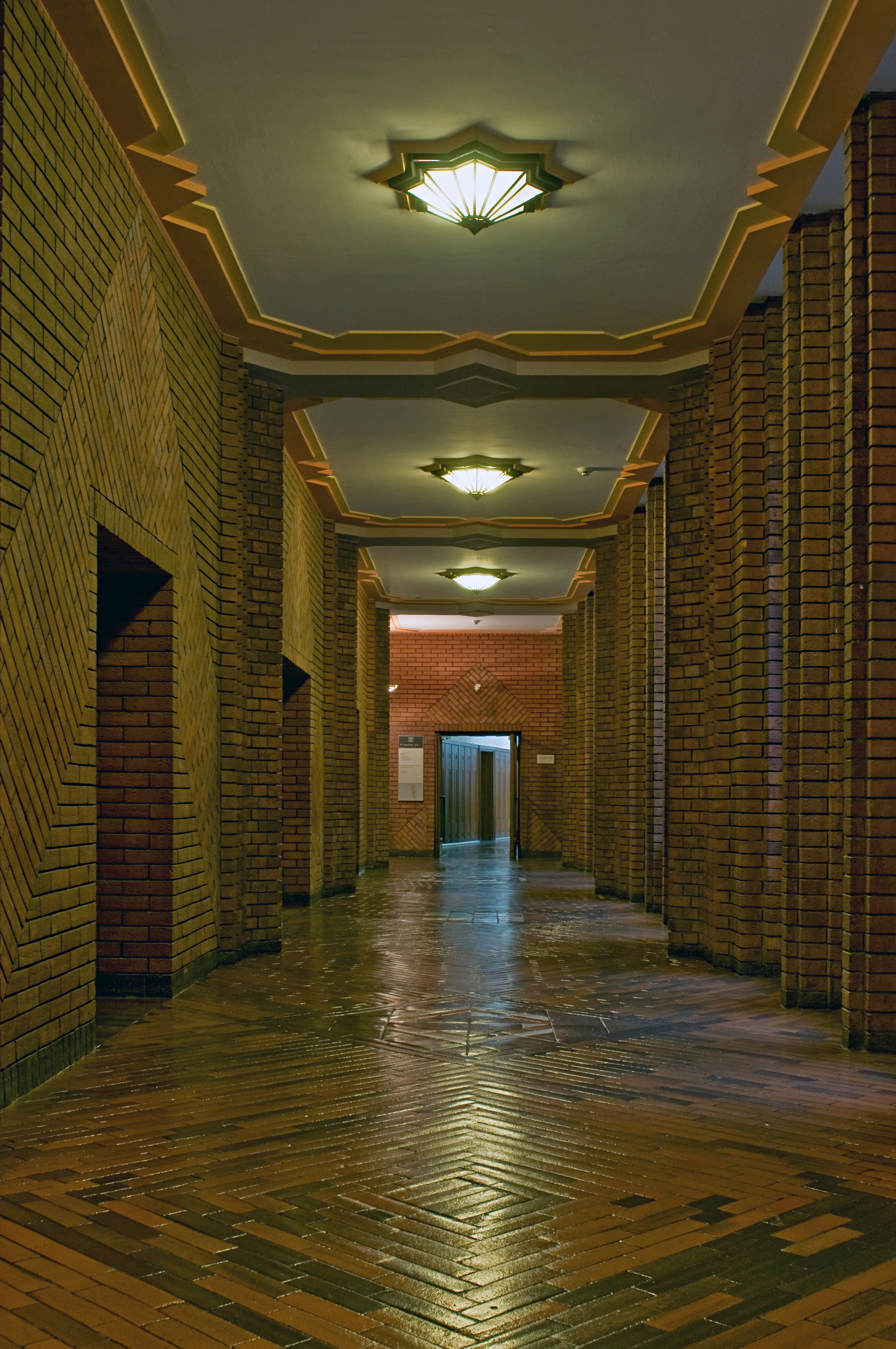
Internal walkway to the entrance hall lined with clinker bricks
