= The Wrestler =

The Wrestler may refer to:

- The Wrestler (1974 film), an American film directed by James A. Westman
- The Wrestler (2008 film), an American film directed by Darren Aronofsky
- "The Wrestler" (song), a song from the 2008 film written and performed by Bruce Springsteen
- The Wrestler (sculpture), an Olmec sculpture
- The Wrestler, a professional wrestling magazine published by Kappa Publishing Group from 1966 to 2013
- The Wrestlers, English title of the 2000 Bengali film Uttara
- "The Wrestler", a 2012 episode of the animated sitcom American Dad!

Wrestlers may refer to:

- Wrestlers (sculpture), a Roman marble sculptural group after a lost Greek original of the 3rd century BC
- Wrestlers, a 1957 painting by Gerard de Rose
- The Wrestlers (Courbet)
- Wrestlers (Eakins), an 1899 painting by Thomas Eakins
- The Wrestlers (Etty), a painting of circa 1840 by William Etty
- The Wrestlers (Luks), a 1905 painting by George Luks

== See also ==
- Love+Sling, 2018 South Korean film also known as Wrestler
- Wrestling (disambiguation)
