= Naked wrestling =

Naked wrestling or nude wrestling could refer to:

- An ancient form of wrestling, which existed before the skin-tight wrestling garment was invented, practised in order to prevent opponent from cloth grappling.
- A euphemism for sexual intercourse
- Naked Women's Wrestling League: a defunct erotic women's professional wrestling promotion

== See also ==
- Nudity in sport
- Wrestling (disambiguation)
