= Magdalene Kreßner =

German sculptor

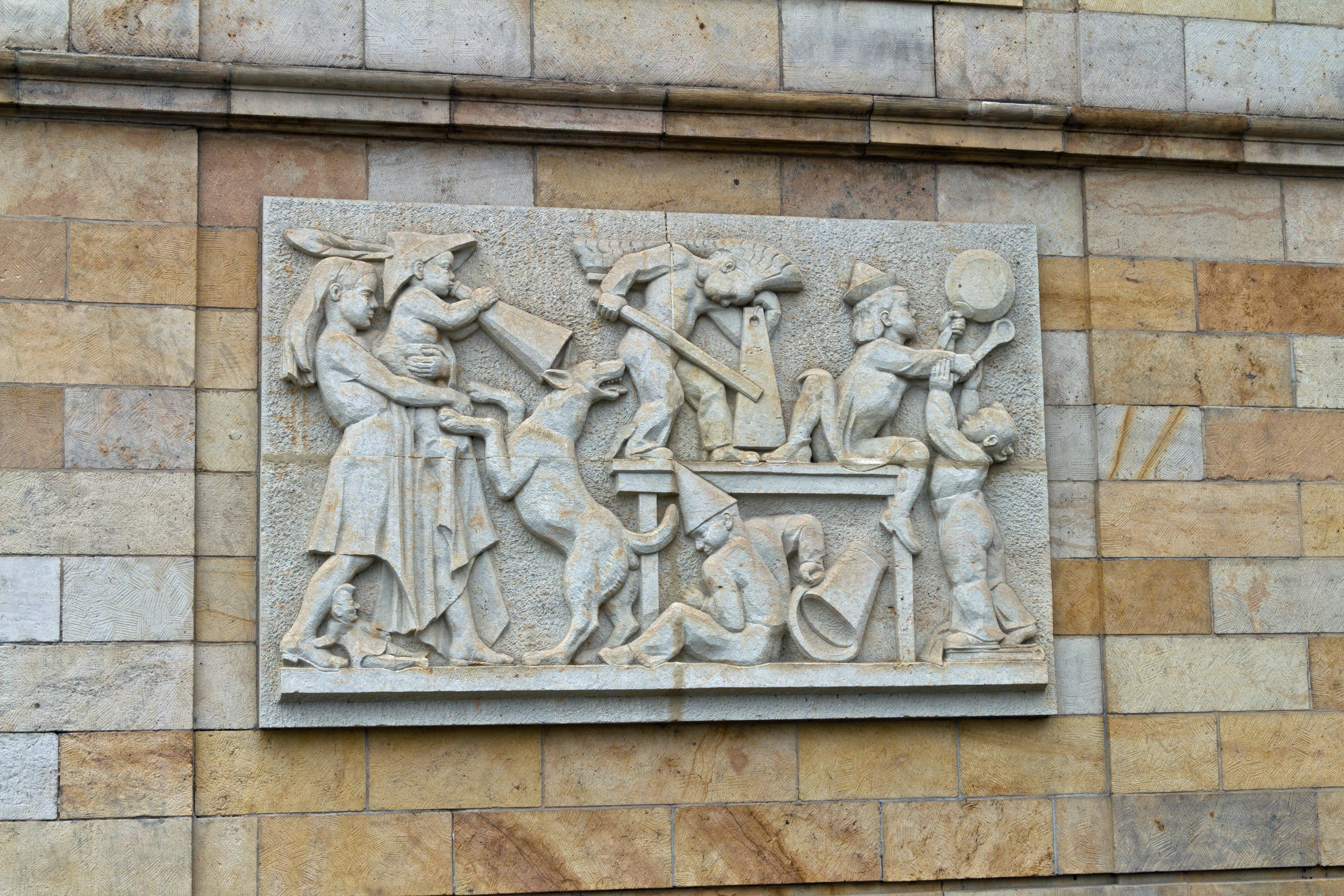
- Sandsteinrelief, Blochmannstraße 1
- Born: 3 October 1899; Schweizerthal (Burgstädt), Saxony, Germany
- Died: 18 May 1975 (aged 75); Radebeul, Saxony, Germany
- Education: Berlin-Charlottenburg Arts Academy; Dresden Academy of Fine Arts
- Occupations: sculptor illustrator

Magdalene Kreßner (3 October 1899 - 18 May 1975) was a German sculptor. She is known, in particular, for her mural reliefs.

== Life ==
Magdalene "Ebbi" Kreßner was born in Schweizerthal (now part of Burgstädt) in the Kingdom of Saxony. As a child she was initially sent to a boarding school, but she hated it. Eventually her parents were persuaded to send her to the "Alte Kunstschule Richter" (Art School) in Dresden where her love of art was awakened. She became determined to become a painter (and at the same time to avoid getting "side-tracked into sculpture"). Between 1921 and 1927 she studied with Wilhelm Gerstel at the Berlin-Charlottenburg Arts Academy (as it was known at that time). She then switched to the Academy of Fine Arts in Dresden where between 1927 and 1930 she was a "Meisterschülerin" (loosely, "master student") of Karl Albiker.

Magdalene Kreßner supported herself as a freelance artist in Dresden between 1930 and 1945. On 13 February 1945 her studio was destroyed in the firestorm and bombing inflicted on the central part of the city by the English and the Americans. She also lost her home. Following the destruction she ended at Oberlößnitz which by this time had been subsumed - formally in 1934 - into Radebeul, a short distance down-river from Dresden, where she made her home at Eduard-Bilz-Straße 42, and where she lived for the rest of her life, in a home that was large enough to incorporate the little studio in which she now worked.

Because her early work was destroyed in the bombing, Magdalene Kreßner is chiefly known for the work she produced between 1945 and 1975. During this time the central portion of Germany, including Dresden and the surrounding region, was administered as the Soviet occupation zone, relaunched in October 1949 as the Soviet sponsored German Democratic Republic (East Germany). The mural reliefs on public buildings for which she would be remembered reflect the style associated with East German public art. Many have themes drawn from classical mythology or from the Christian bible. Among her better known works is the oak crucifixion group produced during 1955/56 for the "Luther Cemetery" at Radebeul. In the judgement of one commentator, it combines content and form with subtle empathy. (Note: "Mit feinem Einfühlungsvermögen verbinden sich hier Inhalt und Form".) Other important works include "Drei Generationen" ("Three generations - 1967"). which is currently part of the Dresden State Art Collection.

Kreßner also produced illustrations for various children's books and, notably, for an early edition of Thomas Mann's vast four-part novel, Joseph and His Brothers.

== Works (selection) ==
- Relief on the outer wall of the rebuilt Orthopedic Clinic at Dresden-Johannstadt (1953/54)
- Relief on the outer wall at Blochmannstraße 1, a large prestigious residential development built as part of Dresden's post-war reconstruction (1954/55)
- Standing woman (naked with cloth), Dresden State Art Collection (various versions: various dates)
- Three generations, Dresden State Art Collection (1967)
- Statuette of a dancer "Peer Gynt", Dresden State Art Collection (1974)
- Children with doll, Dresden State Art Collection (<1953)
