= Anthony Lewis De Rose =

American painter

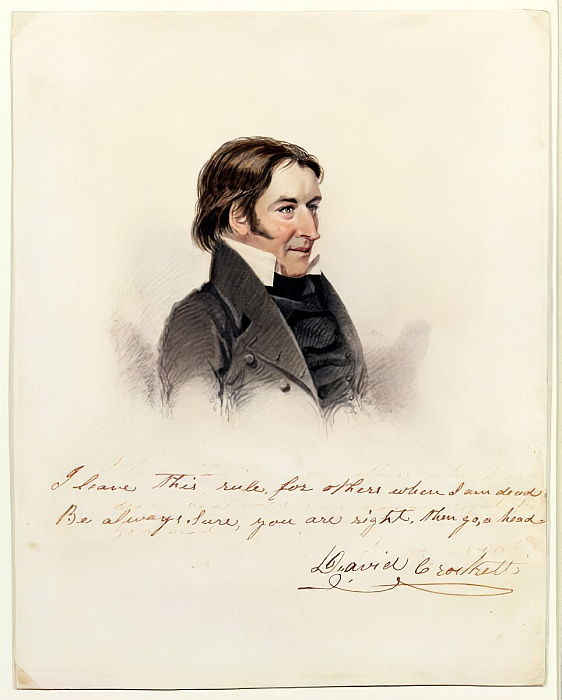
David Crockett by Anthony Lewis De Rose, 1834

Anthony Lewis De Rose (August 17, 1803 - April 16, 1836), also spelled Anthony Lewis DeRose, was an itinerant painter based in New York City.

De Rose was born in New York City and began his painting career in 1821 after a year and a half of study, partially as a student of John Rubens Smith. He exhibited a number of portraits in the National Academy of Design from 1829-1833 but contracted tuberculosis in 1834 which perhaps contributed to his early demise. Today he is perhaps best known for his watercolor portrait of Davy Crockett (1834), in the collection of the New-York Historical Society, but his works have also been exhibited in recent decades at the National Academy of Design.
