= Kathleen Traynor DeRose =

American fintech expert and finance professor

- Citizenship: United States of America
- Education: University of Oxford, Princeton University, New York University Stern School of Business, London School of Economics, Haute Ecole Commerciale
- Awards: Henry Ko prize
- Scientific career
- Fields: Fintech; Finance
- Workplaces: New York University Stern School of Business

Kathleen Traynor DeRose is an American fintech expert and a finance professor. Her areas of special interest and expertise are asset and wealth management, financial technology and quantitative finance, and China's political economy and technology development.

== Career ==
DeRose is a Clinical Associate professor at New York University's Stern School of Business, where she leads Stern's fintech initiatives. She is the Fintech Director for the Fubon Center for Technology, Business and Innovation at the university, where she chairs the Fintech Advisory Board. She serves as a non-executive director on the boards of the London Stock Exchange Group plc., Enfusion, Experian, and Voya Financial, and served as a non-executive director 2015-2020 and as the board chair 2015-2017 of Evolute AG.

She spent over thirty years in the asset and wealth management industries, as a portfolio manager of institutional, ultra-high net worth, and 1940 Act mutual funds, and ultimately in global senior leadership roles. She was a Managing Director and Head of Business Strategy and Solutions at Credit Suisse, the head of Research and Portfolio Management at Hagin Investment Management, and a Managing Director at Bessemer Trust, Deutsche Bank, Zurich Insurance and Scudder Stevens and Clark. She began her career as an equity analyst at JPMorgan Chase.

== Education ==
DeRose earned her MSc., with distinction, from the University of Oxford where her thesis, "Wagering on Welfare; Explaining Provincial Variation in the Chinese Welfare Lottery," earned the Henry Ko prize. She has an MBA from the TRIUM program, a joint degree program from the New York University Stern School of Business, the London School of Economics, and the Haute Ecole Commerciale (HEC). She earned an undergraduate degree from Princeton University.

== Philanthropy ==
DeRose founded the “Kathleen Traynor Research Fund” at Princeton's Bendheim Center for Finance, which supports women's research in finance. She also helped to fund scholarships for women at TRIUM and NYU Stern. She is on the board of Non-traditional Employment for Women (NEW), a New York City not-for-profit.
