= Hermann Rosa =

German sculptor and architect

Hermann Rosa (* November 2, 1911, Pirna; † October 5, 1981, Munich) was a German sculptor and architect.

== Biography ==
Born as the son of a stonemason Hermann Rosa in Pirna, he grew up with six siblings on the castle Oberpolitz. He visited a Stone Mason's College in Saubsdorf (today Supíkovice). During the years of 1934 - 1938 he was a disciple of Professor Drahonovsky at the Art College in Prague. After this he became a student of Professor Karl Albiker at the Dresden Academy of Art in the years of 1939 - 1946 (although there were several interruptions in between).

== Works ==
- 1937 Pferdegruppe composition
- 1947 Wassertägerin (bronze)
- 1948/49 Eva, portrait (bronze)
- 1949 Eva, act (bronze)
- 1950 Flucht (Flight), relief (bronze)
- 1951 Sinnende (bronze)
- 1952 Liebespaar (Lovers) (bronze)
- 1952 Stürzender Engel (bronze)
- 1952 Auferstehung (Resurrection), Relief (bronze)
- 1953 Sitzende (bronze)
- 1953 Stehende mit Ast (bronze)
- 1953/54 Adalbert Stifter, portrait after death mask (bronze)
- 1954 Eva, abstract (bronze)
- 1954 Schmerzensmann (bronze)
- 1954 Adalbert Stifter, bust, memorial in Fürth (Bavaria) (bronze)
- 1955 Käfer (Beetle), after Franz Kafka (bronze)
- 1955/56 Flüchtlinge, relief two-parts (bronze)
- 1970 - 1981 Ludwig Spegel, portrait (bronze)
- 1972 - 1981 Self-portrait (bronze)
- 1977 - 1981 Blitz, fountain Augsburg- Hochzoll (bronze)

== His studios ==
- 1954 - 1959 Studio Wallnerstreet 9, Munich-Freimann
- 1954 - 1959 Studio Wallnerstreet 12, Munich-Freimann
- 1960 - 1968 Studio Osterwaldstreet, Munich-Schwabing
