= Roberto Pinto (Brazilian footballer) =

Brazilian footballer (1937–1994)

Personal information
- Full name: Roberto da Rosa Pinto
- Date of birth: 24 September 1937
- Place of birth: Mendes, Brazil
- Date of death: 1994 (aged 56–57)
- Place of death: Rio de Janeiro, Brazil
- Height: 1.65 m (5 ft 5 in)
- Position: Forward

Youth career
- –1955: Vasco da Gama

Senior career*
Years	Team	Apps	(Gls)
1956–1962	Vasco da Gama	204	(46)
1962–1966	Bangu		
1966–1967	Fluminense	56	(4)
1967–1968	Botafogo-SP		
1969–1971	Ponte Preta		
1972–1974	Olaria		
- * Club domestic league appearances and goals

Roberto da Rosa Pinto (24 September 1937 – 1994) was a Brazilian professional footballer who played as a forward.

== Career ==
Trained in Vasco da Gama's own youth categories, Pinto became a hero when deciding the title of the 1958 Campeonato Carioca, on 17 January 1959 against Flamengo. He also played for Bangu, Fluminense, Botafogo-SP, Ponte Preta and Olaria.

== Personal life and death ==
Roberto was the nephew of the footballers Jair Rosa Pinto and Orlando Rosa Pinto.

Pinto died after being run over in the city of Rio de Janeiro in 1994.

== Honours ==
Vasco da Gama

- Campeonato Carioca: 1956, 1958
- Torneio Rio-São Paulo: 1958
- Torneio Início: 1958
- Troféu Teresa Herrera: 1957
- Tournoi de Paris: 1957
- Torneio de Quadrangular de Lima: 1957
- Torneio de Santiago do Chile: 1957
- Taça Cidade do Rio de Janeiro: 1959

Bangu

- Torneio Início: 1964

Fluminense

- Taça Guanabara: 1966
- Torneio Pará-Guanabara: 1966

Ponte Preta

- Campeonato Paulista Série A2: 1969
