= Wrestling (disambiguation) =

Wrestling is a grappling sport.

Wrestling may also refer to:

- Amateur wrestling
- Collegiate wrestling
- Freestyle wrestling
- Greco-Roman wrestling
- Professional wrestling
- Scholastic wrestling
- Styles of wrestling
- Wrestling (1961 film), a Canadian documentary
- Wrestling (2008 film), an American romantic drama
- The Wrestling, a 1996 nonfiction book by Simon Garfield
- Wrestling (album), a 2021 album by Kučka
- Wrestling Brewster, one of the passengers on the Mayflower
- "Wrestling", a 2007 episode of Zoey 101

== See also ==
- The Wrestler
