= Orlando Rosa Pinto =

Brazilian footballer

Orlando
Personal information
- Full name: Orlando da Rosa Pinto
- Date of birth: 20 September 1911
- Place of birth: Barra Mansa, Brazil
- Date of death: 1962
- Position: Midfielder

Senior career*
Years	Team	Apps	(Gls)
1932–1943	Vasco da Gama	330	(79)
1943–1948	Barra Mansa		
- * Club domestic league appearances and goals as of 9 February 2024

Orlando Rosa Pinto (20 September 1911 – 1962), was a Brazilian professional footballer who played as a midfielder.

== Career ==
Considered the first great player in Vasco's history, Orlando Rosa Pinto commanded the team's midfield in the 1930s, winning in 1934 and 1936 and forming a great partnership with Nena, the team's centre forward. He made 330 appearances and scored 79 goals. In 1943, he played for Barra Mansa FC, a team from his hometown. Orlando also participated in an unofficial match for the Brazil national football team, in 1935, against River Plate.

== Personal life ==
Orlando is the elder brother of Jair Rosa Pinto, and uncle of Roberto Pinto, the scorer of the title goal of 1958 Campeonato Carioca.

== Honours ==
Vasco da Gama

- Campeonato Carioca: 1934 (LCF), 1936 (FMD)
- Taça dos Campeões Estaduais Rio-São Paulo: 1936
- Torneio Luiz Aranha: 1940
- Torneio Início: 1932, 1942
- Troféu da Paz: 1937, 1942

Barra Mansa

- Campeonato Citadino de Barra Mansa: 1944, 1946, 1947, 1948
- Torneio Início de Barra Mansa: 1944, 1946

Rio de Janeiro state team

- Campeonato Brasileiro de Seleções Estaduais: 1935
