= Gerard de Rose =

English painter (1918–1987)

- Born: 1918; Accrington, England
- Died: 1987 (aged 68–69); London, England
- Occupations: Portrait painter and teacher
- Spouse: Noreen
- Children: Theo

Gerard de Rose (1918–1987) was an English portrait painter and teacher.

== Biography ==
=== Early life ===
Gerard de Rose was born in Carrara Cottage, Oxford Street, Accrington, Lancashire, in 1918, the son of a Russian emigree who was a professor of music and a surgeon. de Rose went to Accrington School of Art and then the Royal College of Art in 1939, having won a Royal Exhibition in textile design.

In World War II de Rose served in the Royal Engineers. He took part in the evacuation of Dunkirk.

After the war de Rose returned to the Royal College of Art. On completing his studies he became a lecturer.

=== Marriage and children ===
de Rose married Noreen and they had a son Theo.

=== Teaching ===
de Rose taught at various art colleges from 1950 to 1958, including at the London College of Printing.

From 1958 to 1967 de Rose ran the fine art faculty at Maidstone College of Art as head of faculty.

=== Portrait painting ===
In the 1960s de Rose became well known for his portrait painting. He painted famous people including: the Duke of Bedford; Julie Christie; Quentin Crisp; Sammy Davis Jr.; Claire Bloom; Charlie Drake; Ken Dodd; Mick Jagger; Eric Morecambe; Vladimir Nabokov; Vita Sackville-West; Rod Steiger; and Ernie Wise.

de Rose's portrait of Vladimir Nabokov appeared on the cover of Time magazine.

=== Memberships ===
In 1961 de Rose was elected a member of the Royal Society of British Artists (RBA).

de Rose was also a member of the Chelsea Arts Club.

=== Exhibitions ===
As well as the RBA, de Rose also showed at: the Royal Academy; the Royal Society of Portrait Painters; Paris Salon; Bradford Art Gallery; Manchester Art Gallery; Zayder Gallery; Alwin Gallery; and other galleries,

de Rose also had solo shows, including at: Trafford; Haworth Art Gallery; Alwin Gallery; William Ware Gallery; and widely in America.

=== Death and afterwards ===
de Rose died in Hammersmith Hospital in 1987.

==== Holdings ====
In 1957 the Rochdale Arts & Heritage Service purchased Wrestlers from de Rose. It can be seen at Touchstones Rochdale.

Haworth Art Gallery in Accrington holds much of his work, including Portrait of the Artist's Wife and Self Portrait, both which were a gift from de Rose.

In 1984 Herbert Lom gave de Rose's portrait Herbert Lom (b.1917), as the King in 'The King and I' by Richard Rogers and Oscar Hammerstein II to the Victoria and Albert Museum.
