= Richard Scheibe =

German sculptor (1879–1964)

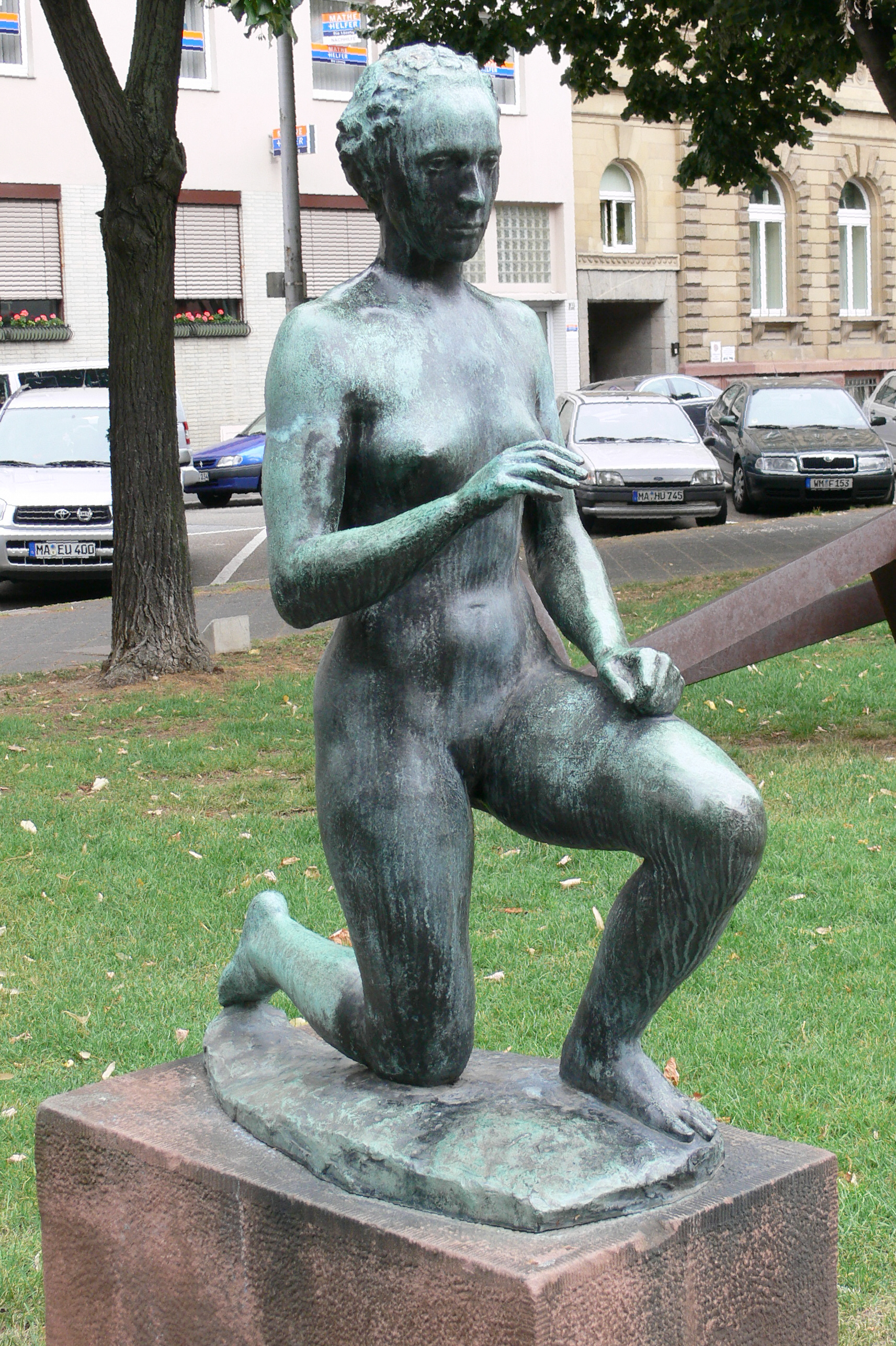
Dawn (German: Die Morgenröte), 1937. Bronze, Skulpturengarten Mannheim

Richard Scheibe (19 April 1879, Chemnitz – 6 October 1964, Berlin) was a German artist primarily remembered as a sculptor. He trained as a painter, and taught himself to sculpt beginning in 1906. From 1925 to 1933 he taught at the Städelsches Kunstinstitut in Frankfurt am Main. He was dismissed from teaching when the Nazis seized power but was reinstated in 1934. He received various recognitions during the Third Reich, including the Goethe-Medaille für Kunst und Wissenschaft and placement on the Gottbegnadeten list. After World War II he continued to sculpt, including a figurative piece for the Memorial to the German Resistance. His work was also part of the sculpture event in the art competition at the 1928 Summer Olympics.

Between 1937 and 1944, with the exception of 1941, a total of eleven sculptures by Scheibe were exhibited at the annual Great German Art Exhibition in Munich. These included his "Decathlete" (1937), "Nymph" (1938), "Thinker" (1938), "Youth" (1939), "Contemplative Woman" (1940), "Rising Woman" (1940), "Supplicant Woman" (1940), "Head of a Warrior" (1940), "Group" (1942), "Flora" (1943) and "Descending Woman" (1944).

== Sources ==
- Robert Thoms: Große Deutsche Kunstausstellung München 1937–1944. Index of artists in two volumes, volume II: Sculptors. Berlin 2011, ISBN 978-3-937294-02-5.
- Ursel Berger. "Scheibe, Richard." In Grove Art Online. Oxford Art Online (accessed 26 December 2011; subscription required).
