= Ortunho =

Brazilian footballer (1935–2002)

Personal information
- Full name: Jorge Carlos Carneiro
- Date of birth: 1 October 1935
- Place of birth: Porto Alegre, Brazil
- Date of death: 6 December 2002 (aged 67)
- Place of death: Porto Alegre, Brazil
- Height: 1.79 m (5 ft 10 in)
- Position: Left-back

Youth career
- 1953–1955: Nacional-RS

Senior career*
Years	Team	Apps	(Gls)
1955–1956	Nacional-RS		
1956–1958	Vasco da Gama		
1958–1967	Grêmio	417	(6)
1968	Metropol		
1968–1969	Cruzeiro-RS		

International career
1956–1960	Brazil	4	(0)
- * Club domestic league appearances and goals

Jorge Carlos Carneiro (1 October 1935 – 6 December 2002), better known as Ortunho, was a Brazilian professional footballer who played as a left-back.

== Career ==
Born in Porto Alegre, he got his nickname from Washington Ortuño, a Uruguayan who played for SC Internacional in the 1940s. He began his career at Nacional de Porto Alegre, even being called up for the Brazilian team that competed in the 1956 Panamerican Championship. He was taken to Vasco da Gama already in 1956 as a bet, to be Coronel replacement. Ortunho was champion of Campeonato Carioca twice and of the Rio-São Paulo Tournament, as a reserve, but was a starter in the dispute for the Teresa Herrera Trophy on Vasco tour of Europe.

In 1958 he arrived at Grêmio, where he remained until 1967, and made 417 appearances, winning nine state titles with the club. An idol of the club, he was even attacked with a glass bottle after a great performance in a Gre-Nal. In 1966, he suffered a knee injury that sidelined him for a large part of that season, returning in 1967 but without the same capacity as before. He still played for EC Metropol and EC Cruzeiro before retiring in 1969.

Ortunho also made four appearances for the Brazil national team in total, with emphasis on his participation in the 1956 and 1960 Panamerican Championship.

== Death ==
Ortunho died on 6 December 2002, in Porto Alegre, due to a cardiac arrest.

== Honours ==
Vasco da Gama

- Campeonato Carioca: 1956, 1958
- Torneio Rio-São Paulo: 1958
- Torneio Início: 1958
- Teresa Herrera Trophy: 1957
- Tournoi de Paris: 1957

Grêmio

- Campeonato Gaúcho: 1958, 1959, 1960, 1962, 1963, 1964, 1965, 1966, 1967
- Campeonato Sul-Brasileiro: 1962
- Campeonato Citadino de Porto Alegre: 1958, 1959, 1960, 1964, 1965

Brazil

- Panamerican Championship: 1956
