= Pinga (footballer, born 1924) =

Brazilian footballer

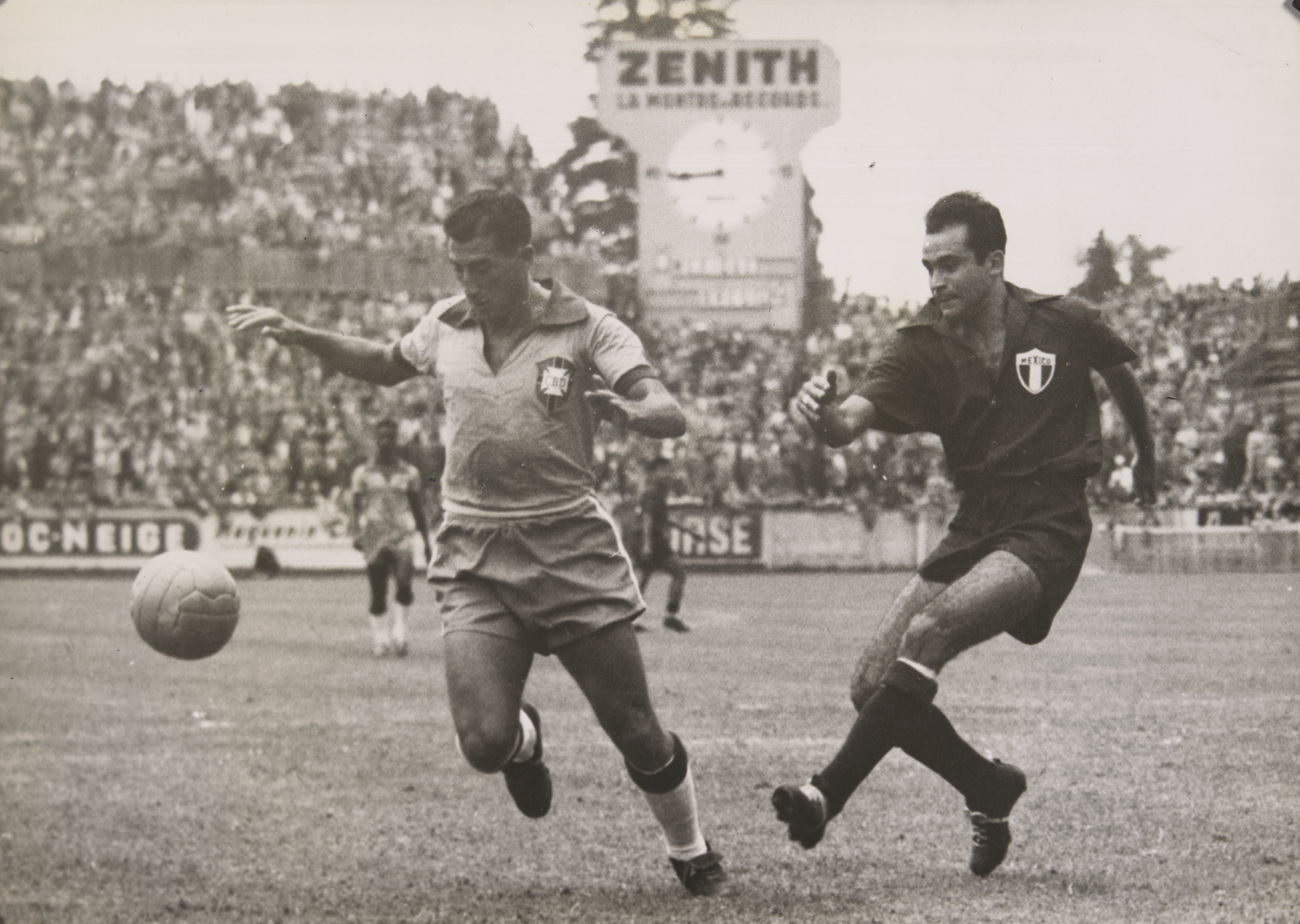

Personal information
- Full name: José Lázaro Robles
- Date of birth: February 11, 1924
- Place of birth: Brazil
- Date of death: May 7, 1996 (aged 72)
- Height: 1.78 m (5 ft 10 in)
- Position: Inside left

Senior career*
Years	Team	Apps	(Gls)
1943–1944	Juventus da Mooca		
1945–1952	Portuguesa		
1953–1962	Vasco da Gama	466	(232)
1962–1964	Juventus da Mooca		

International career
1950-1955	Brazil	17	(10)
- * Club domestic league appearances and goals

José Lázaro Robles, best known as Pinga (February 11, 1924 – May 7, 1996) was a Brazilian footballer.

He was born in São Paulo. During his career (1943–1964) he played for Juventus, Portuguesa and Vasco da Gama, where he played 466 matches from 1953 to 1962 and scored 250 goals. Defending the Brazilian team he participated in the Copa America 1953 and the 1954 FIFA World Cup, playing two games and scoring two goals. He died at 72 years old.

== Personal life ==
Pinga is father of footballer and manager Ziza (José Lázaro Robles Jr.) and brother of Arnaldo Robles.

== Honours ==
Portuguesa

- Torneio Rio–São Paulo: 1952

Vasco da Gama

- Torneio Octogonal Rivadavia Correa Meyer: 1953
- Campeonato Carioca: 1956, 1958
- Tournoi de Paris: 1957
- Torneio Rio–São Paulo: 1958

São Paulo state team

- Campeonato Brasileiro de Seleções Estaduais: 1952

Brazil

- Panamerican Championship: 1952
