= Orlando Peçanha =

Brazilian footballer (1935–2010)

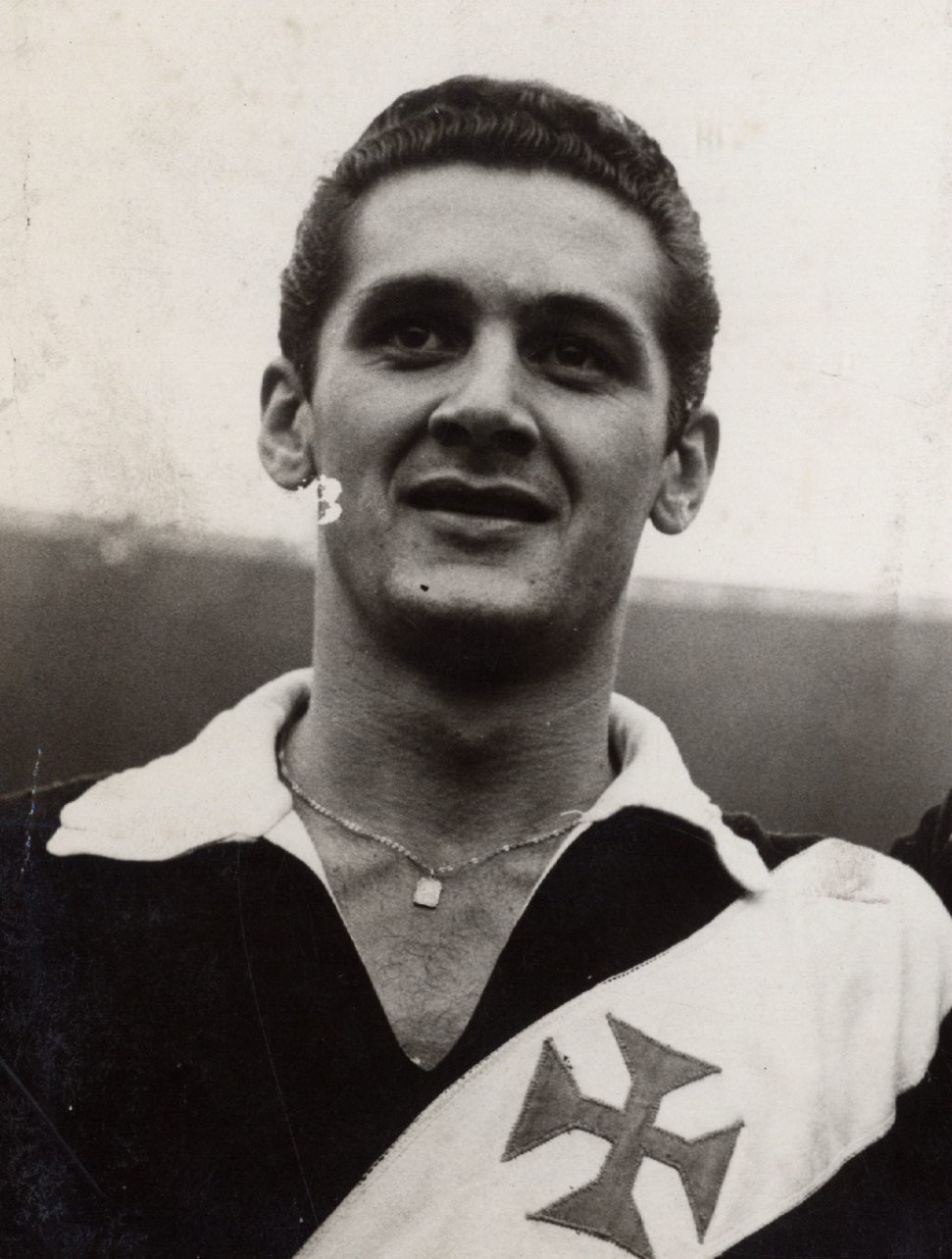
- Orlando in 1961

Personal information
- Full name: Orlando Peçanha de Carvalho
- Date of birth: 20 September 1935
- Place of birth: Niterói, Brazil
- Date of death: 10 February 2010 (aged 74)
- Place of death: Rio de Janeiro, Brazil
- Position: Centre-back

Senior career*
Years	Team	Apps	(Gls)
1953–1961	Vasco da Gama	341	(17)
1961–1965	Boca Juniors	106	(0)
1965–1969	Santos		
1970	Vasco da Gama		

International career
1958–1966	Brazil	31	(0)

Managerial career
- 1977: Fluminense de Feira
- 1977: CSA
- 1978: América-SP
- 1978: Rio Preto
- 1979: Joinville
- 1979: Vitória
- 1980–1981: Kazma
- 1983: Taubaté
- 1987: Fluminense de Feira
- 1988: Galícia
Medal record
Men's Football
Representing Brazil
FIFA World Cup
Winner	1958 Sweden
Copa América
Runner-up	1959 Argentina
- * Club domestic league appearances and goals

Orlando Peçanha de Carvalho (20 September 1935 – 10 February 2010) was a Brazilian footballer who played as a centre-back. He was part of the Brazil national team that won the 1958 FIFA World Cup, and also participated in the 1966 FIFA World Cup as the vice-captain of the team. He earned 31 caps in total.

During his club career he played for Vasco da Gama (1955–1960), Boca Juniors (1960–1964) and Santos (1965–1967).

Orlando died on 10 February 2010, in Rio de Janeiro, from a heart attack, aged 74.

== Club career ==
During his time with Boca he played 119 games for the club, (105 league and 14 Copa Libertadores), he never scored a goal for the club but he had the distinction of being the club captain and he helped them to win two league titles in 1962 and 1964. His third league title was in 1965, playing for Santos.

== Honours ==
Vasco da Gama

- Campeonato Carioca: 1956, 1958
- Tournoi de Paris: 1957
- Torneio Rio–São Paulo: 1958

Boca Juniors

- Argentine Primera División: 1962, 1964
- Copa Libertadores runner-up: 1963

Santos

- Campeonato Paulista: 1965, 1967
- Campeonato Brasileiro Série A: 1965

Brazil

- FIFA World Cup: 1958

Individual

- World XI: 1965
