= 1957 Tournoi de Paris =

Tournament details
- City: Paris
- Dates: 12 – 14 June 1957
- Teams: 4
- Venue: Parc des Princes

Final positions
- Champions: Vasco da Gama
- Runners-up: Real Madrid
- Third place: Racing Paris
- Fourth place: Rot-Weiss Essen

The 1957 Tournoi de Paris was the first edition of Tournoi de Paris, an association football intercontinental competition between European and South American clubs. In particular, the inaugural edition is considered as the precursor to the Intercontinental Cup, as an article on FIFA. Its final match featured the only continental club champions thus far (Vasco da Gama in the 1948 South American Championship and Real Madrid in the 1955–56 European Cup), competing in the final.

Vasco da Gama defeated Real Madrid 4–3 in the final before 65,000 spectators.

== Background ==
The competition was organized by the Racing Club de Paris in celebration of its 25th anniversary. Real Madrid were invited to participate in the competition as 1955–56 European Cup champions, and accepted a few days before winning the 1956–57 edition. Vasco da Gama's participation took place amidst a club's tour of the US and Europe, with several European newspapers citing Vasco as "Brazilian champion of 1956" for having won the 1956 Campeonato Carioca (there was no Brazilian national competition at the time). Furthermore, Vasco held the title of South American champion after winning the 1948 South American Championship of Champions as no other South American tournament of the same proportion took place until the 1960 Copa Libertadores. Finally, Rot-Weiss Essen, the West German champions at the time were invited, as West Germany was the current champions of the FIFA World Cup.

== Teams ==
Team	Location	Qualification
(France) Racing Paris	Paris	Host
(Spain) Real Madrid	Madrid	1955–56 European Cup winners
(West Germany) Rot-Weiss Essen	Essen	1955 German football championship winners
(Brazil) Vasco da Gama	Rio de Janeiro	1948 South American Championship and 1956 Campeonato Carioca winners

== Squads ==
=== Racing Paris ===
Manager: (France) Auguste Jordan

Note: Flags indicate national team as defined under FIFA eligibility rules; some limited exceptions apply. Players may hold more than one non-FIFA nationality.

No.	Pos.	Nation	Player
1	GK	FRA	Jean Taillandier
2	DF	ARG	Carlos Sosa
3	DF	FRA	Bernard Lelong
6	MF	FRA	Dalla Cieca
7	FW	FRA	Joël Pillard
8	DF	FRA	Bruno Bollini

No.	Pos.	Nation	Player
11	FW	FRA	Pierre Grillet
14	MF	FRA	Guy Sénac
17	MF	FRA	Jean Guillot
18	MF	FRA	Bolek Ugorenko
19	FW	POL	Thadée Cisowski
21	DF	FRA	Roger Marche

=== Real Madrid ===
Manager: (Spain) José Villalonga

Note: Flags indicate national team as defined under FIFA eligibility rules; some limited exceptions apply. Players may hold more than one non-FIFA nationality.

No.	Pos.	Nation	Player
1	GK	ESP	Juan Alonso
2	DF	ESP	Marquitos
3	DF	ESP	Manuel Torres
4	DF	URU	José Santamaría
6	MF	ESP	José María Zárraga
7	FW	FRA	Raymond Kopa
8	MF	ESP	Héctor Rial

No.	Pos.	Nation	Player
11	FW	ESP	Francisco Gento
14	MF	ESP	Ramón Marsal
17	MF	ESP	Enrique Mateos
18	MF	ESP	Miguel Muñoz
19	FW	ARG	Alfredo Di Stéfano
21	DF	ESP	Rafael Lesmes

=== Rot-Weiss Essen ===
Manager: (Romania) Elek Schwartz

Note: Flags indicate national team as defined under FIFA eligibility rules; some limited exceptions apply. Players may hold more than one non-FIFA nationality.

No.	Pos.	Nation	Player
1	GK	FRG	Fritz Herkenrath
2	DF	FRG	Willi Köchling
4	MF	FRG	Heinz Ruppenstein
5	DF	FRG	Walter Zastrau
6	MF	FRG	Dieter Wöske
9	FW	FRG	Franz Islacker

No.	Pos.	Nation	Player
10	FW	FRG	Ulrich Kohn
18	DF	FRG	Heinz Wewers
20	MF	NED	Fred Röhrig
21	FW	FRG	Helmut Rahn
24	MF	FRG	Willi Grewer

=== Vasco da Gama ===
Manager: (Brazil) Martim Francisco

Note: Flags indicate national team as defined under FIFA eligibility rules; some limited exceptions apply. Players may hold more than one non-FIFA nationality.

No.	Pos.	Nation	Player
1	GK	BRA	Carlos Alberto
2	DF	BRA	Dario Damasceno
3	DF	BRA	Umbelino Viana
4	DF	BRA	Orlando Peçanha
5	MF	BRA	Laerte
6	DF	BRA	Ortunho
7	MF	BRA	Sabará

No.	Pos.	Nation	Player
8	MF	BRA	Livinho
9	FW	BRA	Vavá
10	FW	BRA	Pinga
11	FW	BRA	Walter Marciano
17	FW	BRA	Vadinho
19	FW	BRA	Almir Pernambuquinho

== Matches ==
Semi-finals
12 June - Paris
(Brazil) Vasco da Gama	3
(France) Racing Paris	1
12 June - Paris
(Spain) Real Madrid	5
(West Germany) Rot-Weiss Essen	0

Final
14 June - Paris
(Brazil) Vasco da Gama	4
(Spain) Real Madrid	3
Third place
14 June - Paris
(France) Racing Paris	7
(West Germany) Rot-Weiss Essen	5

=== Semi-finals ===
12 June 1957

Vasco da Gama (Brazil)	3–1	(France) Racing Paris
Livinho 22'; Pinga 58'; Vavá 67'	Report	Guy Sénac 87'

Parc des Princes, Paris

12 June 1957

Real Madrid (Spain)	5–0	(West Germany) Rot-Weiss Essen
Rial 12'; Mateos 15' 80'; Kopa 54'; Gento 87'	Report

Parc des Princes, Paris

=== Third place match ===
14 June 1957

Racing Paris (France)	7–5	(West Germany) Rot-Weiss Essen
	Report

Parc des Princes, Paris

=== Final ===
14 June 1957

Vasco da Gama (Brazil)	4–3	(Spain) Real Madrid
Valter 20'; Vavá 32'; Ortunho (red card) 61'; Livinho 73'; Sabará 84'	Report	Di Stéfano 4'; Mateos 53'; Kopa 89'

Parc des Princes, Paris
Attendance: 65,000+

== Recognitions ==
In a video report from Les Actualités Françaises, published on 19 June 1957 with narrated images of the match, the match between Vasco da Gama and Real Madrid in the final is called "the confrontation between the best team in South America and the European champions".

After the final between Vasco da Gama and Real Madrid, French newspaper L'Équipe wrote: "And then, suddenly, Real Madrid literally disappeared. Would it be the pale red shirts or the sad blue shorts that weakened the superb Spanish team? No. Rather, wonderful bodies suddenly appeared on the other side, wrapped tightly in white shirts with a black stripe, of 11 football athletes, of 11 black devils who took control of the ball and never let go. During the next half hour the incredible, prodigious impression one had was that the great Real Madrid champion of Europe, the untouchable Real Madrid winner of all European constellations was learning to play football". The newspaper France Soir stated after the tournament: "Real Madrid is not the greatest team in the world. Talk to Vasco da Gama about that", and the Jornal dos Sports cited Vasco as "world champions". The Spanish newspaper ABC de Madrid wrote that "Real Madrid were no longer invincible".

According to the Brazilian newspaper Tribuna de Imprensa in October 1958, the idea for the conception of the Intercontinental Cup came from João Havelange, then president of CBD, and Jacques Goddet, journalist of L'Équipe and owner and resident of the Parc des Princes. According to the Le Corner, Goddet drew inspiration from the match between Vasco da Gama and Real Madrid in 1957 to conceive the Intercontinental Cup.

In 2023, a FIFA.com article mentioned the 1957 final match as "the most notable meeting between teams from two continents meeting before 1960".
