= Sabará (footballer) =

Brazilian footballer (1931–1997)

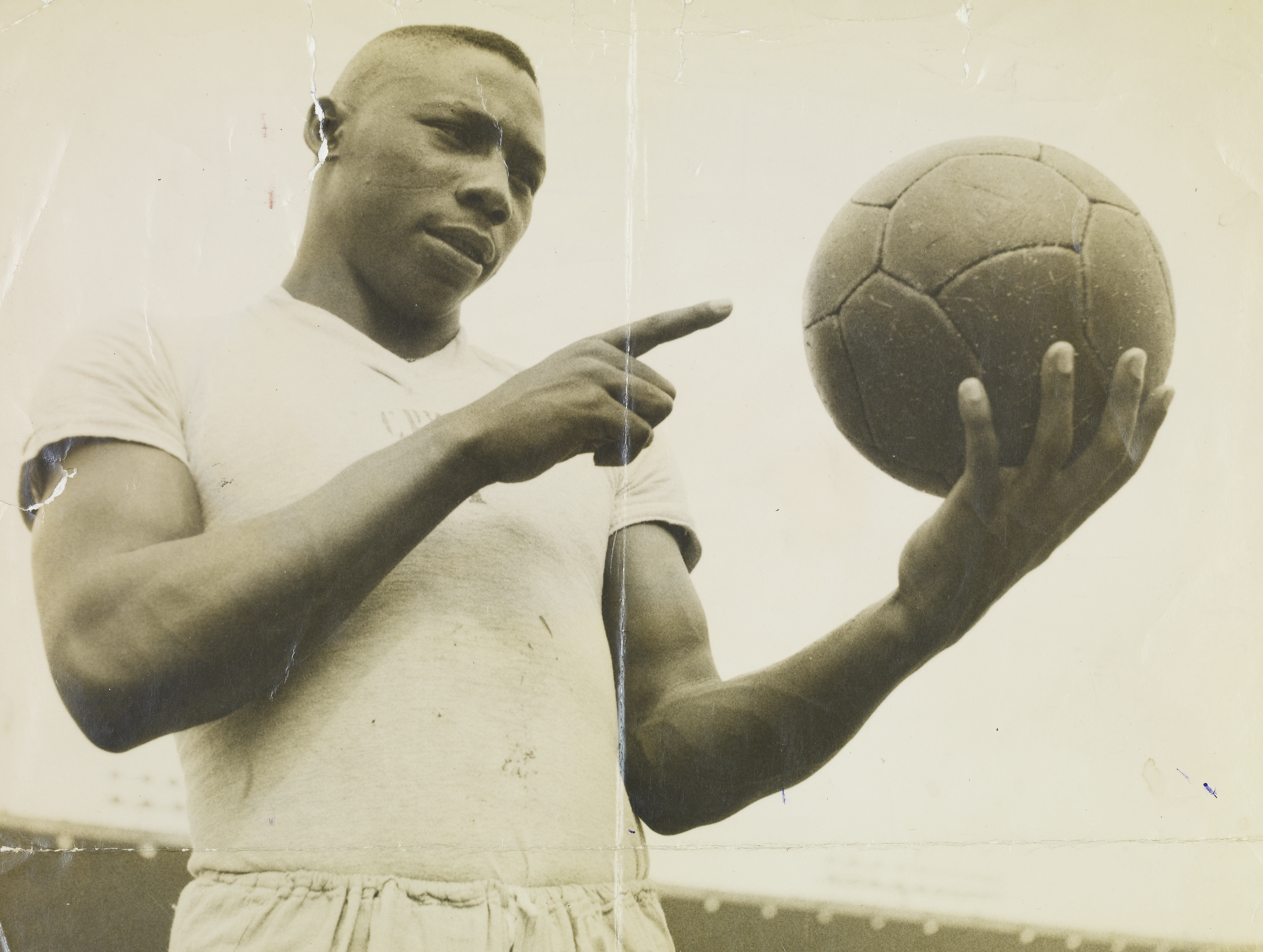
- Sabará in 1953

Personal information
- Full name: Onofre Anacleto de Souza
- Date of birth: 18 June 1931
- Place of birth: Atibaia, Brazil
- Date of death: 8 October 1997 (aged 66)
- Place of death: Rio de Janeiro, Brazil
- Position: Midfielder

Senior career*
Years	Team	Apps	(Gls)
1949–1951	Ponte Preta	116	(58)
1952–1963	Vasco da Gama	576	(165)
1963	America-RJ		
1964	Portuguesa-RJ		
1965–1966	Deportivo Italia		

International career
1955–1956	Brazil	4	(1)
- * Club domestic league appearances and goals

Onofre Anacleto de Souza (18 June 1931 – 8 October 1997), better known as Sabará, was a Brazilian professional footballer who played as a midfielder.

== Club career ==
Sabará began his career at AA Ponte Preta in 1949, playing as a right midfielder. He ended up being traded to Vasco da Gama as a bargaining chip for striker Jansen. Unpretentiously, Sabará became one of the biggest names in Vasco's history, making 576 appearances, being the second player who wore the club's shirt the most, behind Roberto Dinamite. He also played for America and Portuguesa da Ilha and ended his career in 1966 at Deportivo Italia, becoming the Venezuelan champion.

== International career ==
For the Brazil national team, he played for the first time on 13 November 1955, in the Taça Oswaldo Cruz against Paraguay. Sabará was the scorer of one of the goals. He played in a few more friendlies in 1956.

== Personal life and death ==
The nickname "Sabará" is in reference to one of the names given to the jabuticaba fruit. He is the father of striker Tiquinho, who played for the Brazil Olympic team in 1975.

Sabará died in October 1997 in Rio de Janeiro, due to heart problems.

== Honours ==
Brazil

- Taça Oswaldo Cruz: 1955

Vasco da Gama

- Campeonato Carioca: 1952, 1956, 1958
- Torneio Rio-São Paulo: 1958
- Torneio Início: 1958
- Torneio Octogonal Rivadavia Correa Meyer: 1953
- Teresa Herrera Trophy: 1957
- Tournoi de Paris: 1957
- Torneio Internacional da Cidade do México: 1963

Deportivo Italia

- Venezuelan Primera División: 1966
