= 1958 in Brazil =

Events in the year 1958 in Brazil.

== Incumbents ==
=== Federal government ===
- President: Juscelino Kubitschek
- Vice President: João Goulart

=== Governors ===
- Alagoas:
  - Sizenando Nabuco de Melo (until 24 January)
  - Sebastião Muniz Falcão (from 24 January)
- Amazonas: Plínio Ramos Coelho
- Bahia: Antônio Balbino
- Ceará:
  - Paulo Sarasate (until 3 July)
  - Flávio Marcílio (from 3 July)
- Espírito Santo: Francisco Lacerda de Aguiar
- Goiás: José Ludovico de Almeida
- Maranhão: José de Matos Carvalho
- Mato Grosso: João Ponce de Arruda
- Minas Gerais: José Francisco Bias Fortes
- Pará: Magalhães Barata
- Paraíba:
  - Flávio Coutinho (until 4 January)
  - Pedro Gondim (from 4 January)
- Paraná: Moisés Lupion
- Pernambuco:
  - Osvaldo Cordeiro de Farias (until 14 November)
  - Otávio Correia de Araújo (from 14 November)
- Piauí: Jacob Gaioso e Almendra
- Rio de Janeiro:
  - Miguel Couto Filho (until 2 July)
  - Togo Barros (from 2 July)
- Rio Grande do Norte: Dinarte de Medeiros Mariz
- Rio Grande do Sul: Ildo Meneghetti
- Santa Catarina:
  - Jorge Lacerda (until 16 June)
  - Heriberto Hülse (from 16 June)
- São Paulo: Jânio Quadros
- Sergipe: Leandro Maciel

=== Vice governors ===
- Alagoas: Sizenando Nabuco de Melo
- Ceará: Wilson Gonçalves
- Espírito Santo: Adwalter Ribeiro Soares
- Goiás: Bernardo Sayão Carvalho Araújo
- Maranhão: Alexandre Alves Costa
- Mato Grosso: Henrique José Vieira Neto
- Minas Gerais: Artur Bernardes Filho
- Paraíba: Pedro Gondim
- Pernambuco:
  - Otávio Correia de Araújo (until 14 November)
  - Vacant thereafter (from 14 November)
- Piauí: Francisco Ferreira de Castro
- Rio de Janeiro: Roberto Silveira
- Rio Grande do Norte: José Augusto Varela
- Santa Catarina:
  - Heriberto Hülse (until 16 June)
  - Vacant thereafter (from 16 June)
- São Paulo: Porfírio da Paz
- Sergipe: José Machado de Souza

== Establishments ==
- Construction of the Basilica of St. Joseph the Worker, Barbacena was completed.

== Events ==
=== January ===
- January 16: An unidentified flying object is seen by the crew of the Brazilian Naval ship Almirante Saldanha, in the so-called Trindade Island Case.
- January 25: President Juscelino Kubitschek officially inaugurates the first nuclear reactor in Brazil and Latin America, called IEA-R1 in São Paulo.

=== April ===
- April 19: The Archdiocese of Aparecida is established by Pope Pius XII.

=== May ===
- May 8: A collision between two electric trains occurs in Rio de Janeiro, leaving more than 300 dead.

=== June ===
- June 24: Lucas Lopes is appointed as the new Minister of Finance, who would implement the Monetary Stabilization Plan. This plan would aim to stabilize inflation, meet IMF requirements for the acquisition of a loan of 300 million, and to maintain the works of construction in Brasília.
- June 29: Brazil defeats Sweden 5–2 to win the 1958 FIFA World Cup. It is the first time Brazil wins the FIFA World Cup.
- June 30: The Alvorada Palace officially opens in Brasília, which is the official residence of the President of Brazil.

=== July ===
- July 14: An 18-year-old student named Aída Curi, is thrown from the 12th floor of an Avenida Atlântica building by boys in a Copacabana neighborhood.

=== October ===
- October 3: Direct general elections for state governments, the Federal Senate, the Chamber of Deputies, and legislative assemblies are held.

=== November ===
- November 8:The bossa nova is born in Rio de Janeiro, with João Gilberto's recording of Chega de Saudade.

=== December ===
- December 24: Inflation closes the year at 24.39%, according to the IGP-DI calculated by the FGV. Decree nº 45.106-A is signed, which increases the minimum wage by more than 50% starting next year.

== Births ==
=== January ===
- January 6 – Cássia Kis, actress
- January 11 – Ruy de Queiroz, mathematician
- January 28 – Maitê Proença, actress

=== February ===
- February 8 – Marina Silva, politician
- February 16 – Oscar Schmidt, professional basketball player

=== March ===
- March 20 – Edson Celulari, actor

=== April ===
- April 4 – Cazuza, singer (d.1990)

=== September ===
- September 14 – Silas Malafaia, evangelical pastor, author, and televangelist

== Deaths ==
=== January ===
- January 19 – Cândido Rondon, explorer and engineer (b.1865)

=== February ===
- February 10 – José Pancetti, painter (b.1902)

=== June ===
- June 16 – Nereu Ramos, 20th President of Brazil (b. 1888)

== See also ==
- 1958 in Brazilian football
- 1958 in Brazilian television
