= Carlos Alberto (footballer, born 1932) =

Brazilian footballer (1932–2012)

Personal information
- Full name: Carlos Alberto Martins Cavalheiro
- Date of birth: 25 January 1932
- Place of birth: Rio de Janeiro, Brazil
- Date of death: 29 June 2012 (aged 80)
- Place of death: Rio de Janeiro, Brazil
- Position: Goalkeeper

Senior career*
Years	Team	Apps	(Gls)
1951–1957	Vasco da Gama		
1958–1961	Portuguesa		

International career
1952–1960	Brazil Olympic	17	(0)
Medal record
Men's Football
Representing Brazil
Pan American Games
Silver medal – second place	1959 Chicago
- * Club domestic league appearances and goals

Carlos Alberto Martins Cavalheiro (25 January 1932 – 29 June 2012), better known as Carlos Alberto, was a Brazilian footballer who played as a goalkeeper. He was part of the Brazil national team that competed in the 1952 Summer Olympics, 1959 Pan American Games, and the 1960 Summer Olympics.

As he was a member of the Brazilian Air Force, Carlos Alberto could not establish a professional contract, being the goalkeeper in most of the Brazilian team's Olympic and Pan American competitions in the 1950s. He was also the goalkeepers coach for Brazil in the 1974 FIFA World Cup.

== Honours ==
Brazil

- Pan American Games: silver medal 1959

Vasco da Gama

- Campeonato Carioca: 1952, 1956
- Teresa Herrera Trophy: 1957
- Tournoi de Paris: 1957
