= Sociedade Esportiva Itapirense =

Itapirense
- Full name: Sociedade Esportiva Itapirense
- Nicknames: Esportiva; Vermelhinha
- Founded: 24 March 1947; 79 years ago
- Ground: Estádio Chico Vieira
- Capacity: 4,800
- President: Ronaldo César da Silva
- Head coach: Tássio Lopes
- League: Campeonato Paulista Série A3
- 2025: Paulista Série A3, 8th of 16
Home colours	Away colours

Sociedade Esportiva Itapirense, more commonly referred to as Itapirense, is a Brazilian football club based in Itapira, São Paulo. It competes in the Campeonato Paulista Série A3, the third tier of the São Paulo state football league.

It was founded on March 24, 1947, and its colors are red and white.

== History ==
The history of the Itapirense is, to say the least, curious. Founded on March 24, 1947, right in the year of its foundation, it competed in its first official competition for the Campeonato do Interior. In the Paulista Championship, it started only in the following decade, in the Third Division (current Campeonato Paulista Série A3), disputing two seasons: 1954 and 1957.

During this period, Itapirense revealed defender Hilderaldo Bellini, captain and world champion with the Brazil National Team in 1958, who eternalized the gesture of lifting the world title. At the time of the 1958 World Cup, the defender was already defending the Club de Regatas Vasco da Gama.

The club stayed away from professionalism between 1954 and 1956, returning to the Third Division in 1957. At that time, the club did not pass the first phase, being eliminated by the now extinct Expresso São Carlos.

In the next ten seasons, the Itapira team was far from professionalism, dedicating itself only to amateur competitions. Years later, in 1969, Itapirense was back in the Campeonato Paulista Segunda Divisão (Fourth division) and, surprisingly, lifted the title of champion, but, in the same unusual way, gave up competing the following year, returning only 36 years later.

The year 2005 marked the resurgence of the club, with a new work plan the social action, which is designed to keep children and adolescents in the city of Itapira away from violence and drugs, interfering positively in the families of the youth of the club. For this, the U-10, U-12, U-14, U-16 and U-20 categories were created, with the latter competing in the Paulista Championship of the category. Besides taking the boys off the streets, the project offers dental and health treatment, education, and social promotion. In 2006, based on the youth teams, the professional team participated again in a competition of the FPF, the Paulista Segunda Divisão (Fourth Division), reaching 12th place among the 48 teams registered. The club rose in 2007 to Serie A-3, after being runner-up in the fourth division. In its debut in the Serie A3 in 2008, Itapirense made a regular campaign, reaching a modest 13th place. In 2009, the team made a better campaign. It reached the final quadrangular and fought for access until the last round, but ended the championship without getting the spot for the Serie A2.

The first classification for the A2 series came after a regular campaign in 2013.

On January 25, 2014, Sociedade Esportiva Itapirense made its debut in the Campeonato Paulista A2, against São Caetano, winning 2–1.

However, after a poor campaign, marked by controversy with coach Paulinho Ceará and striker Finazzi, the club ended the championship in the relegation zone, returning to the A3 in 2015.

The stay in the A3 did not last long, considering that Vermelhinha was relegated to Segunda Divisão. The team graduated in 2016, returning only in 2018, to dispute the Segunda Divisão. In the Segunda Divisão, it was in 11th place in 2018 and 2019, in 2020 in 13th; and in 2021, not passing the First phase, ranking 24th.

In 2022, the Vermelhinha had a good campaign in the Segunda Divisão. Surprised in the first phase and came first in Group 4, leaving behind traditional clubs like União São João and Paulista. In the second phase, it also passed first in the group with 13 points gained; in the group with Itararé, Catanduva and SKA Brasil. Already in the quarterfinals, eliminated Penapolense with the aggregate score of 3 to 2 and in the semifinal he guaranteed access to the Campeonato Paulista Série A3 of 2023 against Grêmio São-Carlense, drawing 1 to 1 in São Carlos and 0 to 0 in its domains, advancing due to the best campaign. With guaranteed access, came the vacancy for the final, being defeated by the undefeated Grêmio Prudente, 2 to 0 in Itapira and 1 to 0 in Prudentão.

== Current team ==
Note: Flags indicate national team as defined under FIFA eligibility rules; some limited exceptions apply. Players may hold more than one non-FIFA nationality.

No.	Pos.	Nation	Player
—	GK	BRA	Maranhão (On-loan)
—	GK	BRA	Dhionata
—	DF	BRA	Yuri Bambu
—	DF	BRA	Vitão
—	DF	BRA	Davi
—	DF	BRA	Miguel
—	DF	BRA	Ariel
—	DF	BRA	Mathues Assumpção
—	DF	BRA	Thales
—	DF	BRA	Caike Cintra
—	MF	CMR	Kamdem
—	MF	BRA	Marcos Lima
—	MF	BRA	Andrei (On-loan)
—	MF	BRA	Matheus Bueno
—	MF	BRA	Danilo Santos
—	MF	BRA	Eric Melo
—	FW	BRA	Felipe Matheus
—	FW	BRA	Fernandes
—	FW	BRA	Vinicius
—	FW	CMR	Marius
—	FW	BRA	Bruno Henrique
—	FW	BRA	Pedro Café
—	FW	BRA	Lucas Mineiro
—	FW	BRA	Lucas Henrique

== Honours ==
=== State ===
- Campeonato Paulista Série A4
  - Winners (1): 1969

=== Youth team ===
- Campeonato Paulista de Futebol Sub-20: Segunda Divisão:
  - 'Winners (2): 2017, 2018

== Ultras ==
- Torcida Organizada Kueio Loko

== Stadium ==
Sociedade Esportiva Itapirense play their home games at Estádio Municipal Coronel Francisco Vieira, nicknamed Estádio Chico Vieira. The stadium has a maximum capacity of 4,800 people.
