= Vavá =

Brazilian footballer (1934–2002)

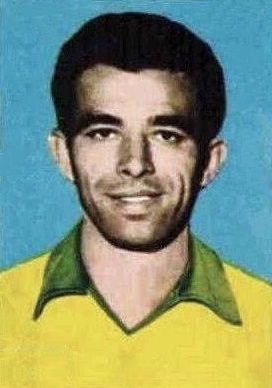
- Vavá in 1962

Personal information
- Full name: Edvaldo Izídio Neto
- Date of birth: 12 November 1934
- Place of birth: Recife, Brazil
- Date of death: 19 January 2002 (aged 67)
- Place of death: Rio de Janeiro, Brazil
- Height: 1.74 m (5 ft 8 1/2 in)
- Position: Striker

Senior career*
Years	Team	Apps	(Gls)
1949–1950	Sport Recife		
1951–1958	Vasco da Gama	456	(191)
1958–1961	Atlético Madrid	71	(31)
1961–1963	Palmeiras	142	(71)
1964–1967	América		
1967–1968	Toros Neza		
1968	San Diego Toros	28	(5)
1969	Portuguesa		
Total		697	(298)

International career
1955–1964	Brazil	20	(15)

Managerial career
- 1971–1972: Córdoba
- 1974–1975: Córdoba
- 1977–1978: Granada
- 1984–1985: Al Rayyan
Medal record
Men's Football
Representing Brazil
FIFA World Cup
Winner	1958 Sweden
Winner	1962 Chile
- * Club domestic league appearances and goals

Edvaldo Izidio Neto (12 November 1934 – 19 January 2002), commonly known as Vavá, was a Brazilian professional footballer who is widely considered to be one of the greatest strikers of his generation. Nicknamed "Peito de Aço" (Steel Chest), he most notably played for Vasco da Gama, Atlético Madrid, Palmeiras and the Brazil national team.

== Career ==
At club level, Vavá started his career with Sport Recife from 1949 to 1950. Between 1958 and 1961, he played for Atlético Madrid, moving abroad for the first time. Vavá finished his career with Potuguesa de Desportos in 1970.

Vavá earned twenty caps with the Brazil national team between 1955 and 1964, scoring a total of fifteen goals. On 13 November 1955, he debuted in the Oswaldo Cruz Cup against Paraguay. Vavá was part of the team that won both the 1958 and 1962 FIFA World Cups, in which he scored five and four goals respectively. Furthermore, he was a joint-recipient of the 1962 World Cup Golden Boot as one of the tournament's top scorers. Vavá was also part of Brazil's squad for the 1952 Summer Olympics.

Vavá scored in the World Cup finals of both 1958 (twice) and 1962 (once), thus becoming the first player to score in two finals. Only five players have achieved this feat, the other four being Pelé, Paul Breitner, Zinedine Zidane, and Kylian Mbappé. He remained the only player to have scored in two consecutive World Cup final matches until Mbappé achieved the feat in 2022, having also scored in the final in 2018.

== Death ==
On 19 January 2002, Vavá died in a Rio de Janeiro clinic on Saturday aged 67.

== Club statistics ==
Club performance			League	
Season	Club	League	Apps	Goals
Spain			League	
1958–59	Atlético Madrid	La Liga	27	16
1959–60	Atlético Madrid	La Liga	29	10
1960–61	Atlético Madrid	La Liga	15	5
Country	Spain		71	31
United States			League	
1968	San Diego Toros	North American Soccer League	28	5
Country	United States		28	5
Total			99	36

== Honours ==
=== Club ===
Sport Recife

- Campeonato Pernambucano: 1949

Vasco da Gama

- Campeonato Carioca: 1952, 1956, 1958
- Torneio Rivadavia Correa Meyer: 1953
- Tournoi de Paris: 1957
- Torneio Rio–São Paulo: 1958

Atlético de Madrid

- Copa del Rey: 1959–60, 1960–61

Palmeiras

- Campeonato Paulista: 1963

Club América

- Liga MX: 1966

=== International ===
Brazil national football team

- FIFA World Cup: 1958, 1962

=== Individual ===
- FIFA World Cup Golden Shoe: 1962
- Brazilian Football Museum Hall of Fame
