= Hilderaldo Bellini =

Brazilian footballer (1930–2014)

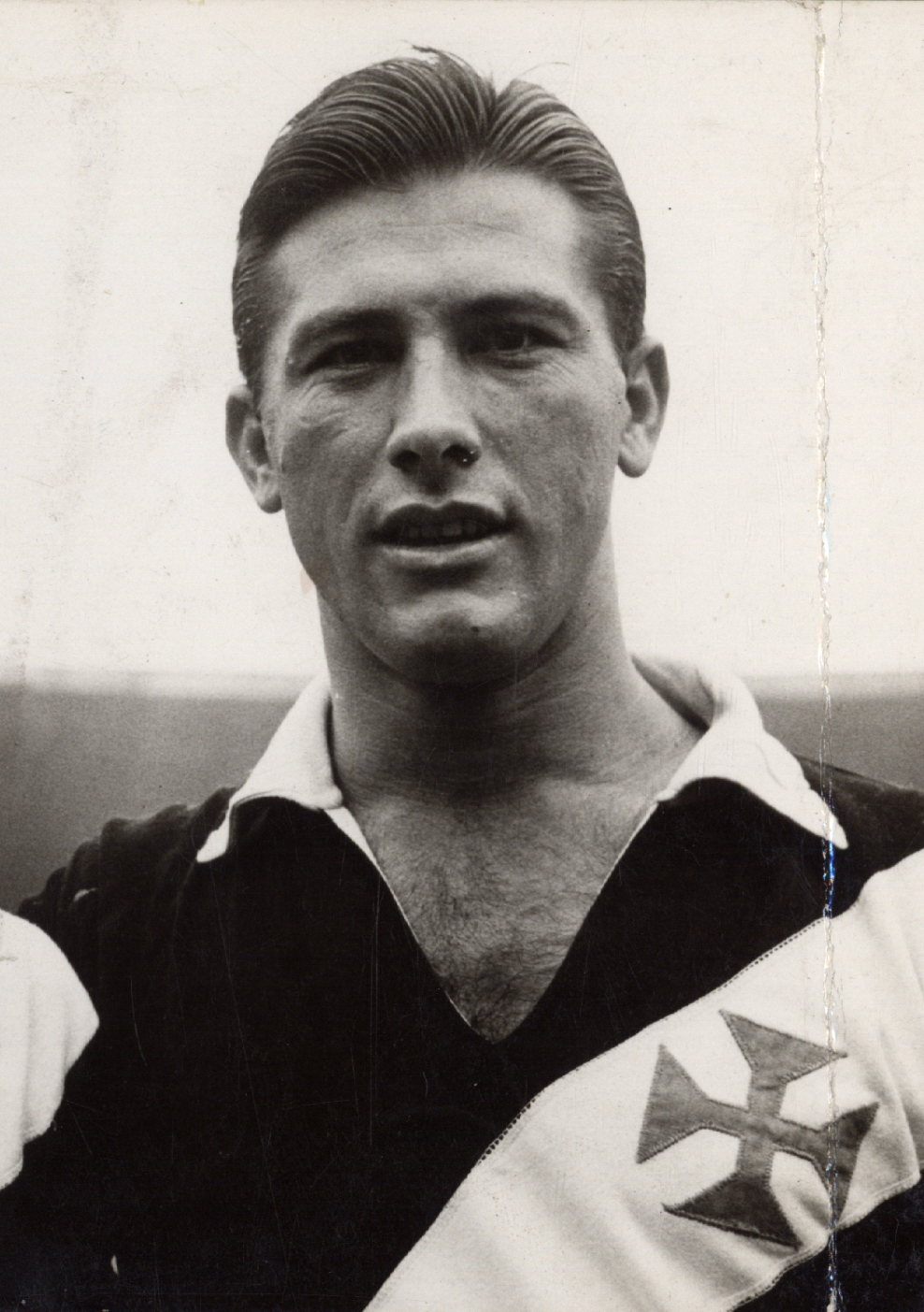
- Bellini in 1961

Personal information
- Full name: Hilderaldo Luiz Bellini
- Date of birth: 7 June 1930
- Place of birth: Itapira, Brazil
- Date of death: 20 March 2014 (aged 83)
- Place of death: São Paulo, Brazil
- Height: 1.85 m (6 ft 1 in)
- Position: Centre-back

Senior career*
Years	Team	Apps	(Gls)
1952–1962	Vasco da Gama	430	(1)
1962–1967	São Paulo	205	(1)
1968–1969	Atlético Paranaense		

International career
1957–1966	Brazil	51	(0)
Medal record
Men's Football
Representing Brazil
FIFA World Cup
Winner	1958 Sweden
Winner	1962 Chile
South American Championship
Runner-up	1957 Peru
Runner-up	1959 Argentina
- * Club domestic league appearances and goals

Hilderaldo Luiz Bellini (7 June 1930 – 20 March 2014) was a Brazilian footballer who played as a centre-back. He captained Brazil national team to victory in the 1958 FIFA World Cup and was part of the team that won the 1962 FIFA World Cup.

== Biography ==
During his career, he played for Vasco da Gama,São Paulo FC and Atlético Paranaense, and he was the first Brazilian to lift the World Cup in 1958. He won another World Cup in 1962 and participated also at 1966 FIFA World Cup as the team captain again.

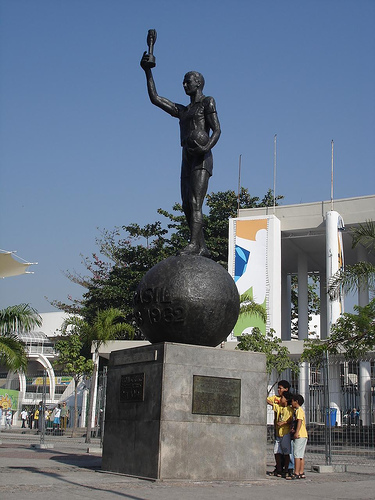
Statue of Bellini at the entrance of Maracanã

He was honoured with a statue at the entrance of the Maracanã stadium, which depicts him lifting the 1958 World Cup trophy. At the end of his international career from 1957 to 1966 with Brazil, he earned a total of 51 caps being the captain during the 1958 FIFA World Cup in Sweden.

Bellini is credited with starting the tradition of lifting the trophy into the air in football. He initially did this so that photographers could have a better view of the trophy and, as the photos were published around the world, the gesture became associated with victory.

Bellini died on 20 March 2014, aged 83, in São Paulo, due to complications caused by Alzheimer's disease culminating with cardiac arrest.

Shortly after his death in 2014, Brazilian footballer Bellini was posthumously diagnosed with CTE. Bellini, along with Pelé, Didi and Garrincha, led Brazil to FIFA World Cup victories in 1958 and 1962.

== Honours ==
Vasco da Gama

- Campeonato Carioca: 1952, 1956, 1958
- Torneio Octogonal Rivadavia Corrêa Meyer: 1953
- Torneio Rio–São Paulo: 1958
- Torneio Início do Rio de Janeiro: 1958

São Paulo

- Pequena Copa do Mundo: 1963

Brazil

- FIFA World Cup: 1958, 1962
- Roca Cup: 1957, 1960
- Copa do Atlântico: 1960

Individual

- FIFA World Cup All-Star Team: 1958
