= Lindolfo (footballer) =

Brazilian footballer

Personal information
- Full name: Lindolfo Mário de Pádua Melo
- Date of birth: 14 March 1930
- Place of birth: Assis, Brazil
- Date of death: 5 October 2012 (aged 82)
- Place of death: Santos, Brazil
- Height: 1.69 m (5 ft 7 in)
- Position: Goalkeeper

Youth career
- –1949: Ferroviária Assisense

Senior career*
Years	Team	Apps	(Gls)
1949–1951	São Bento (M)		
1952–1956	Portuguesa	130	(0)
- * Club domestic league appearances and goals as of 7 October 2024

Lindolfo Mário de Pádua Melo (14 March 1930 – 5 October 2012), simply known as Lindolfo, was a Brazilian professional footballer who played as a goalkeeper.

== Career ==
Lindolfo began his career as a goalkeeper playing for Ferroviária Assisense amateurs. In 1949, he was hired by AA São Bento de Marília, where he remained until 1951, when he was acquired by Portuguesa de Desportos. Despite his short stature, he stood out for his power, being Portuguesa's goalkeeper in winning the 1952 Rio-São Paulo Tournament. He later lost the competition to goalkeeper Muca, remaining at Portuguesa as a reserve until 1956, when he retired from football. Lindolfo was also a weightlifter, combining practice with his career, which guaranteed him a body distinct from other players of the period.

== Honours ==
Portuguesa

- Torneio Rio-São Paulo: 1952, 1955
- Fita Azul: 1951, 1953, 1954
