= Lindolfo =

Lindolfo is a Spanish and Portuguese given name. Notable people with the name include:

- Epitácio Lindolfo da Silva Pessoa (1865–1942), Brazilian jurist, 11th president of Brazil
- Juan Lindolfo Cuestas (1837–1905), 18th president of Uruguay
- Lindolfo Collor (1890–1942), Brazilian politician
- Lindolfo Delgado (born 1994), Mexican boxer
- Lindolfo Mário de Pádua Melo (1930–2012), Brazilian football goalkeeper

== See also ==
- Estádio Lindolfo Monteiro, stadium in Teresina, Piauí
