= Arnaldo Robles =

Brazilian footballer

Arnaldo / Pinga II
Personal information
- Full name: Arnaldo Robles
- Date of birth: 6 November 1921
- Place of birth: São Paulo, Brazil
- Date of death: 15 February 2015 (aged 93)
- Place of death: São Paulo, Brazil
- Position: Midfielder

Youth career
- 1936–1943: Juventus-SP

Senior career*
Years	Team	Apps	(Gls)
1944	Juventus-SP		
1944–1950	Portuguesa	97	(36)
1951–1953	XV de Jaú		
1953	Juventus-SP		
- * Club domestic league appearances and goals as of 17 February 2024

Arnaldo Robles (6 November 1921 – 15 February 2015), also known as Pinga Fogo or Pinga II, was a Brazilian professional footballer who played as a midfielder.

== Career ==
Revealed at CA Juventus, Robles marked his time playing for Portuguesa de Desportos, where he gained the nickname "Pinga Fogo", later "Pinga II", with the recognition of his brother José Lázaro Robles, which was a great success and became more famous. He also played for XV de Jaú.

== Personal life ==
Arnaldo is the brother of footballer Pinga, and uncle of Ziza.

== Honours ==
XV de Jaú

- Campeonato Paulista Série A2: 1951
