= 1980 Campeonato Carioca =

Campeonato Carioca
- Season: 1980
- Champions: Fluminense
- Taça de Ouro: Fluminense; Flamengo; Vasco da Gama; Botafogo; Bangu
- Taça de Prata: América; Volta Redonda; Americano; Campo Grande; Serrano
- Taça de Bronze: Olaria; Madureira
- Matches played: 159
- Goals scored: 348 (2.19 per match)
- Top goalscorer: Cláudio Adão (Fluminense) - 20 goals
- Biggest home win: Flamengo 7-1 Niterói (September 10, 1980); Campo Grande 6-0 Niterói (October 19, 1980)
- Biggest away win: Serrano 0-4 Botafogo (August 17, 1980)
- Highest scoring: Flamengo 7-1 Niterói (September 10, 1980)

The 1980 edition of the Campeonato Carioca kicked off on August 17, 1980 and ended on November 30, 1980. It is the official tournament organized by FFERJ (Federação de Futebol do Estado do Rio de Janeiro, or Rio de Janeiro State Football Federation). Only clubs based in the Rio de Janeiro State are allowed to play. Eighteen teams contested this edition. Fluminense won the title for the 24th time. Serrano and Olaria were relegated.

== System ==
The tournament would be divided in four stages:

- Torneio Seletivo: That phase would be disputed by the seven worst teams of the loser's group in last year's championship. the seven teams all played in a single round-robin format against each other and the three best teams qualified to the main championship.
- Taça João Baptista Coelho Netto: The fourteen teams all played in a single round-robin format against each other. The champions qualified to the Finals, and the four worst teams were eliminated.
- Taça Gustavo de Carvalho: The ten remaining teams all played in a single round-robin format against each other. The champions qualified to the Finals.
- Final phase: The champions of the two stages would play each other in one match. The winners won the title.

== Championship ==
=== Taça Guanabara ===
Played from July until August, this was the last edition of the Taça Guanabara as a tournament separate from the Campeonato Carioca.

Pos	Team	Pld	W	D	L	GF	GA	GD	Pts	Qualification or relegation
1	Flamengo	5	3	2	0	6	1	+5	8	Champions
2	Americano	5	3	1	1	6	3	+3	7	
3	Botafogo	5	0	5	0	4	4	0	5	
4	Vasco da Gama	5	1	2	2	3	5	−2	4	
5	Fluminense	5	1	1	3	4	7	−3	3	
6	América	5	1	1	3	3	6	−3	3	

Updated to match(es) played on August 3, 1980. Source: RSSSF.com
Rules for classification: 1) points; 2) wins; 3) goal difference; 4) number of goals scored.

=== Torneio Seletivo ===
Pos	Team	Pld	W	D	L	GF	GA	GD	Pts	Qualification or relegation
1	Olaria	6	4	1	1	5	1	+4	9	Qualified
2	Niterói	6	2	3	1	8	5	+3	7	Qualified
3	Volta Redonda	6	1	4	1	7	7	0	6	Qualified
4	Friburguense	6	2	2	2	5	8	−3	6	
5	Portuguesa	6	1	3	2	2	5	−3	5	
6	Madureira	6	0	5	1	2	3	−1	5	
7	São Cristóvão	6	1	2	3	4	4	0	4	

Updated to match(es) played on September 7, 1980. Source: RSSSF.com
Rules for classification: 1) points; 2) wins; 3) goal difference; 4) number of goals scored.

=== Taça João Baptista Coelho Netto ===
Pos	Team	Pld	W	D	L	GF	GA	GD	Pts	Qualification or relegation
1	Fluminense	13	9	3	1	26	9	+17	21	Playoffs
2	Vasco da Gama	13	9	3	1	21	7	+14	21	Playoffs
3	Flamengo	13	7	5	1	23	8	+15	19	
4	Botafogo	13	7	4	2	15	7	+8	18	
5	Bangu	13	7	3	3	16	10	+6	17	
6	Americano	13	4	5	4	15	14	+1	13	
7	América	13	4	4	5	11	13	−2	12	
8	Serrano	13	4	3	6	18	21	−3	11	
9	Volta Redonda	13	3	5	5	8	15	−7	11	
10	Campo Grande	13	2	6	5	9	8	+1	10	
11	Goytacaz	13	2	5	6	9	16	−7	9	Eliminated
12	Olaria	13	2	4	7	8	18	−10	8	Eliminated
13	Bonsucesso	13	2	3	8	7	18	−11	7	Eliminated
14	Niterói	13	1	3	9	9	31	−22	5	Eliminated

Updated to match(es) played on October 22, 1980. Source: RSSSF.com
Rules for classification: 1) points; 2) wins; 3) goal difference; 4) number of goals scored.

==== Playoffs ====
Team 1	Score	Team 2
Fluminense	1–1 (4-1 pen.)	Vasco da Gama

=== Taça Gustavo de Carvalho ===
Pos	Team	Pld	W	D	L	GF	GA	GD	Pts	Qualification or relegation
1	Vasco da Gama	9	7	1	1	19	9	+10	15	Qualified to Finals
2	Flamengo	9	6	2	1	21	11	+10	14	
3	Botafogo	9	3	2	4	10	11	−1	8	
4	Bangu	9	5	0	4	10	7	+3	10	
5	Fluminense	9	2	4	3	15	15	0	8	
6	Serrano	9	4	1	4	7	10	−3	9	
7	Campo Grande	9	5	1	3	8	7	+1	11	
8	América	9	2	2	5	6	12	−6	6	
9	Americano	9	1	3	5	8	16	−8	5	
10	Volta Redonda	9	2	0	7	13	19	−6	4	

Updated to match(es) played on November 27, 1980. Source: RSSSF.com
Rules for classification: 1) points; 2) wins; 3) goal difference; 4) number of goals scored.

=== Aggregate table ===
Pos	Team	Pld	W	D	L	GF	GA	GD	Pts	Qualification or relegation
1	Vasco da Gama	22	16	4	2	40	16	+24	36	Taça de Ouro
2	Flamengo	22	13	7	2	44	19	+25	33	Taça de Ouro
3	Fluminense	22	11	7	4	41	24	+17	29	Taça de Ouro
4	Bangu	22	12	3	7	26	17	+9	27	Taça de Ouro
5	Botafogo	22	10	6	6	25	18	+7	26	Taça de Ouro
6	Campo Grande	22	7	7	8	17	15	+2	21	Taça de Prata
7	Serrano	22	8	4	10	25	31	−6	20	Taça de Prata
8	América	22	6	6	10	17	25	−8	18	Taça de Prata
9	Americano	22	5	8	9	23	30	−7	18	Taça de Prata
10	Volta Redonda	22	5	5	12	21	34	−13	15	Taça de Prata
11	Goytacaz	13	2	5	6	9	16	−7	9	
12	Olaria	13	2	4	7	8	18	−10	8	Taça de Bronze
13	Bonsucesso	13	2	3	8	7	18	−11	7	
14	Niterói	13	1	3	9	9	31	−22	5	

Updated to match(es) played on November 27, 1980. Source: RSSSF.com
Rules for classification: 1) points; 2) wins; 3) goal difference; 4) number of goals scored.

=== Finals ===
30 November 1980
Final

Fluminense	1 – 0	Vasco da Gama
Edinho 77'

Maracanã, Rio de Janeiro
Attendance: 108,957
Referee: Arnaldo Cézar Coelho
