= Itapira =

- Municipality
- Municipality of Itapira
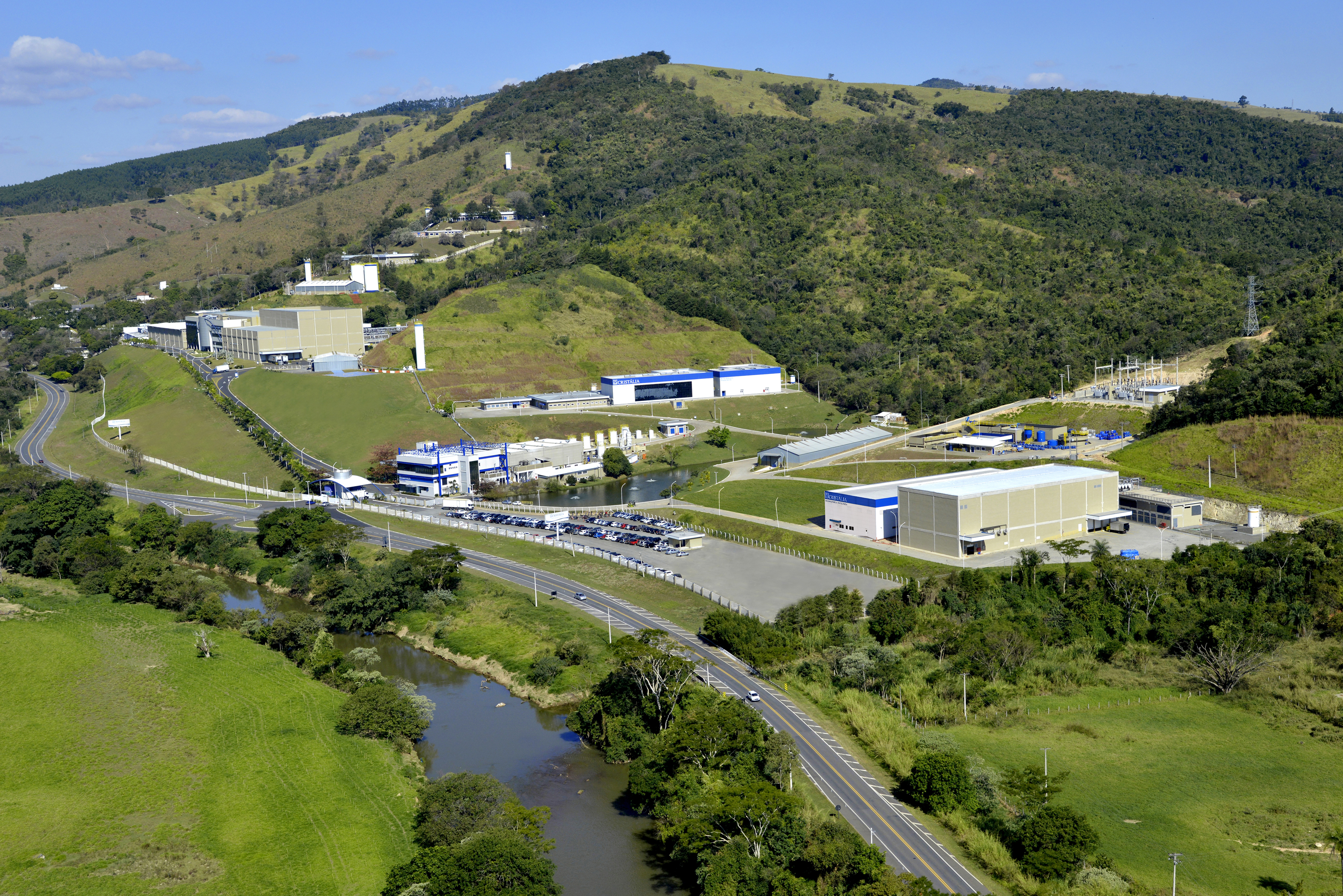

- Flag Coat of arms

- Location in São Paulo state

- Location in Brazil
- Coordinates: 22°26′10″S 46°49′18″W
- Country: Brazil
- Region: Southeast
- State: São Paulo

Government
  - Mayor: Antônio Hélio Nicolai (PSD)

Area
  - Total: 518 km^{2} (200 sq mi)
- Elevation: 643 m (2,110 ft)

Population (2020)
  - Total: 75,234
  - Density: 145/km^{2} (376/sq mi)
- Demonym: Itapirense
- Time zone: UTC-03:00 (BRT)
  - Summer (DST): UTC-02:00 (BRST)
- Area code: +55 19
- HDI (2010): 0.762 – high
- Website: itapira.sp.gov.br

Itapira is a municipality in the state of São Paulo in Brazil. The population is 75,234 (2020 est.) in an area of 518 km^{2} (200 sq mi). The elevation is 643 m.

== History ==
From the eighteenth century, there were already some residents in the region, whose descendants would stand out in the first quarter of the nineteenth century, through the figures of two citizens: João Gonçalves de Morais and Manuel Pereira da Silva, acclaimed the founders of the primitive Itapira, whose first name was "Macuco." João Gonçalves de Morais, possessing a large portion of land in the locality, donated a part of them to the Catholic church. fathers, for the people to venerate as patron of the place, which was placed in a small chapel built of wood and inaugurated on March 19, 1821, when the chaplain, Father Antônio de Araújo Ferraz, celebrated the first mass. October 24, 1820, the toppling of a bush cape was begun on the top of the Morais land, and the chapel was erected there. João Gonçalves de Morais was married to Maria Alve s Leme, who gave him four children: Pedro, Manuel, Antonio and Francisco. There are no accurate records of the dates of his birth and death.

Manuel Pereira, trusted person of João Gonçalves de Morais, was the co-founder of Itapira. He was also the "first protector and procurator" of the image of Our Lady of Penha, according to a document left by João Gonçalves de Morais himself. He also owned large tracts of land and left numerous descendants. His father (or grandfather) seems to have been called Manuel Pereira Velho. It is also said that he married twice, the first with Maria Antônia Pereira da Silva and the second with Maria Isabel Pereira da Silva. Nor is there any concrete data on the dates of his birth and death.

Soon, the evolution of Macuco would have a milestone: the arrival of the rich farmer João Baptista de Araújo Cintra in 1840. To him, a member of the traditional and well-to-do family of farmers in the cities of Atibaia, Bragança Paulista and Amparo, and the beginning of the coffee culture, besides the construction of the chamber, the chain and a large mother church, a temple that served the population for a century, until 1955, when it was demolished. For his pioneering spirit, he was awarded the title of commander of the Imperial Order of the Rose. Emperor Dom Pedro II and Empress Teresa Cristina received his residence when the monarch was in the city on October 27, 1886. Commander João Cintra, born in Atibaia in 1805, was the son of the lieutenant Jacinto José de Araújo Cintra and of Maria Francisca Cardoso, having married in 1828 with his niece Maria Jacinta de Araújo Cintra. He died in Itapira with an advanced age, before the end of the century, leaving numerous descendants.

Another expressive date is that of February 8, 1847, when, by Provincial Law No. 1, sanctioned by the president of the province of São Paulo, Manuel da Fonseca Lima e Silva, the parish was raised to hitherto the Curada chapel of Nossa Senhora da Penha. In 1858, José Joaquim Torres, the president of the province of São Paulo, signed Law 4, creating the town of Nossa Senhora da Penha, whose solemn installation took place on September 20 of that same year, together with the first councilors, who had been elected on September 7, the first mayor being Lieutenant Colonel Francisco Lourenço Cintra.

On April 20, 1871, Provincial Law No. 41 gave the name Penha do Rio do Peixe to the town, still a village of Nossa Senhora da Penha. With this law, the provincial government responded to a request from the chamber. Through the ordinance signed by the president of the province, counselor Laurindo Abelardo de Brito, dated October 17, 1879, the town of Penha do Rio do Peixe was elevated to the category of term, creating the civil forum and council of jurors, whose installation was given on 8 November. Later, in 1881, on April 7 of that year, the senator of the empire Florencio de Abreu took office, in the presidency of the province of São Paulo, an authority that had to give the inhabitants of the town of Penha to the category of city. The request made by the chamber was justified on the grounds that the village had a good headquarters, an excellent chain and a chamber house and a population of more than 7,000 souls. On June 27 of that same year, the decree raising the town of Penha do Rio do Peixe was signed by Florêncio de Abreu.

On February 11, 1888, the local slave-owning planters, angered by the action of police chief Joaquim Firmino de Araújo Cunha, who joined the abolitionist movement and gave protection to the slaves fleeing their masters, culminated in the assassination of the police authority. This lamentable happened had great repercussion in all Brazil, causing that the municipal Intendance asked the governor of the state, Prudente de Morais, to change the name of the city, in order that, with the passage of the time, fell in the forgetfulness the pitiful occurred. Thus, through decree no. 40, of April 1, 1890, the city of Penha do Rio do Peixe was called Itapira. A little later, the district of Itapira was created. The São Paulo government had Dr. Bernardino de Campos in front of him when a judicial review of the state was made, creating 25 new counties, including, among them, that of Itapira, through Law No. 80 of August 25 of 1892, and was installed on 8 October of the same year, by the judge of law Jose Maria Bourrol. The meaning of the word Itapira, according to the geographical dictionary of the province of São Paulo, by João Mendes Caldeira, is explained as follows: Ita (stone, (tip, cliff, that is, tip of stone or pointed stone).

== City of the crazy ==
The municipality of Itapira is nicknamed the "City of the Mad" because it houses three large psychiatric hospitals, one of which is one of the largest in area in the Americas and the world, the Bairral Institute of Psychiatry, with more than seventy years of tradition, going from the center to the edge of the city (sometimes called the "psychiatric city" institute), the Santa Fé Rest Clinic, world-famous for introducing and using innovative concepts in modern psychiatry, as well as the Cristália clinic located in Itapira road - Lindoia. Because of this, the city of Itapira is known as the pole of the psychiatric treatment, bringing together the greatest professionals of the area in the two institutions.

== Sports ==
=== Football in Itapira ===
The municipality of Itapira invests heavily in its football. The team of Sociedade Esportiva Itapirense is currently disputing the Campeonato Paulista Segunda Divisão. The municipal stadium is called Coronel Francisco Vieira, also known as "Chico Vieira", with capacity for 4,800 people. Hilderaldo Bellini, who debuted with Itapirense in 1946, captained the winning Brazil National Team in the 1958 World Cup. He is credited with being the first World Cup captain to lift the trophy high into the air. Bellini performed in several teams, such as Vasco and São Paulo. After suffering from Alzheimer's disease, he died on March 20, 2014, in São Paulo, at the age of 83. He was buried in Itapira, where he was received with honors from all Itapirenses and other authorities present.

== Economy ==
Today Itapira services an agricultural hinterland which grows oranges, sugar-cane, cattle and (now-declining) coffee, but is also a manufacturing centre, specializing in wood and paper products, agricultural machinery, and ethanol production. The establishment in 1937 (by spiritist groups) of the pioneering Instituto Bairral psychiatric hospital in Itapira has fostered a well-developed health sector, both public and private. The town is home to a large number of professionals (such as the noted economist J.B. de Souza Ferreira Fo.), many of whom commute to neighbouring towns such as Campinas.

The town's Historical Museum displays interesting relics of one of the last major battles of the Paulista War, which was fought nearby.

== Media ==
In telecommunications, the city was served by Companhia Telefônica Brasileira until 1973, when it began to be served by Telecomunicações de São Paulo. In July 1998, this company was acquired by Telefónica, which adopted the Vivo brand in 2012.

The company is currently an operator of cell phones, fixed lines, internet (fiber optics/4G) and television (satellite and cable).

== Religion ==
Christianity is present in the city as follows:

=== Catholic Church ===
The Catholic church in the municipality is part of the Roman Catholic Diocese of Amparo.

=== Protestant Church ===
The most diverse evangelical beliefs are present in the city, mainly Pentecostal, including the Assemblies of God in Brazil (the largest evangelical church in the country), Christian Congregation in Brazil, among others. These denominations are growing more and more throughout Brazil.

== See also ==
- List of municipalities in São Paulo
