= Finazzi =

Finazzi is an Italian surname. Notable people with the surname include:

- Alexandre Finazzi (born 1973), Brazilian footballer and manager
- Lucas Finazzi (born 1990), Brazil-born Italian footballer

== See also ==
- Tinazzi
