= 1958 in Brazilian television =

This is a list of Brazilian television related events from 1958.

== Events ==
- 29 June - Brazil beat Sweden 5–2 to win the 1958 World Cup at Solna, Sweden.

== Television shows ==
- Sítio do Pica-pau Amarelo (1952–1963)

== Births ==
- 29 March - Pedro Bial, TV host, producer, director, writer & journalist

== See also ==
- 1958 in Brazil
