= Muca (footballer) =

Brazilian footballer

Personal information
- Full name: Levy Baldassari
- Date of birth: 6 February 1928
- Place of birth: Jacarezinho, Brazil
- Date of death: 23 September 1958 (aged 30)
- Place of death: Jacarezinho, Brazil
- Position: Goalkeeper

Senior career*
Years	Team	Apps	(Gls)
–1950	Esportiva de Jacarezinho		
1950–1953	Portuguesa	91	(0)
1954–1958	Esportiva de Jacarezinho		
- * Club domestic league appearances and goals as of 7 October 2024

Levy Baldassari (6 February 1928 – 23 September 1958), better known as Muca, was a Brazilian professional footballer who played as a goalkeeper.

== Career ==
Born in Jacarezinho, he played for the city's club, which stood out as state runner-up in the early 1950s. He caught the attention of Portuguesa de Desportos and was traded in an exchange. He quickly gained prominence, even representing the São Paulo state football team in 1953. Even at his peak, he returned to Jacarezinho, where his father-in-law ran a farm.

== Death ==
Muca died on 23 September 1958, shortly after retiring from football, after being stabbed during a disturbance at a wedding party.

== Honours ==
Portuguesa

- Torneio Rio-São Paulo: 1952
- Fita Azul: 1951, 1953
