= 1959 Campeonato Brasileiro Série A =

Campeonato Brasileiro Série A
- Season: 1959
- Dates: 23 August 1959 – 29 March 1960
- Teams: 16
- Champions: Bahia (1st title)
- Copa Libertadores: Bahia
- Matches: 36
- Goals: 103 (2.86 per match)
- Top goalscorer: Léo Briglia (8 goals)
- Biggest home win: Sport Recife 6-0 Bahia

The 1959 Campeonato Brasileiro Série A (officially the 1959 Taça Brasil) was the 2nd edition of the Campeonato Brasileiro Série A. It began on 23 August 1959, and ended on 29 March 1960, in a tie-break match played in Rio de Janeiro, won by Bahia.

== Format ==
The competition was a single elimination knockout tournament featuring two-legged ties, with a Tie-Breaker if the sides were tied on points (however, if the tie-break was a draw, the aggregate score of the first two legs was used to determine the winner).

== Teams ==
Sixteen state champions qualified for the tournament.

| Team | Home city | Qualification method |
|---|---|---|
| (Rio Grande do Norte) ABC | Natal | 1958 Campeonato Potiguar champions |
| (Minas Gerais) Atlético Mineiro | Belo Horizonte | 1958 Campeonato Mineiro champions |
| (Paraná (state)) Atlético Paranaense | Curitiba | 1958 Campeonato Paranaense champions |
| (Paraíba) Auto Esporte Clube | João Pessoa | 1958 Campeonato Paraibano champions |
| Bahia | Salvador | 1958 Campeonato Baiano champions |
| Ceará | Fortaleza | 1958 Campeonato Cearense champions |
| (Alagoas) CSA | Maceió | 1958 Campeonato Alagoano champions |
| (Maranhão) Ferroviário | São Luís | 1958 Campeonato Maranhense champions |
| (Rio Grande do Sul) Grêmio | Porto Alegre | 1958 Campeonato Gaúcho champions |
| (Santa Catarina (state)) Hercíllo Luz | Tubarão | 1958 Campeonato Catarinense champions |
| (Rio de Janeiro (state)) Manufatora | Niterói | 1958 Campeonato Fluminense champions |
| (Espírito Santo) Rio Branco | Vitória | 1958 Campeonato Capixaba champions |
| (São Paulo (state)) Santos | Santos | 1958 Campeonato Paulista champions |
| (Pernambuco) Sport Recife | Recife | 1958 Campeonato Pernambucano champions |
| (Pará) Tuna Luso | Belém | 1958 Campeonato Paraense champions |
| (Guanabara (state)) Vasco da Gama | Rio de Janeiro | 1958 Campeonato Carioca champions |

== Northern Zone ==
=== Northeastern Group ===
| Semi-Finals | | | Scores | | |
| | Points | | 1st leg | 2nd leg | Tie-break |
|---|---|---|---|---|---|
| ABC | 2 : 2 | Ceará | 1 - 1 | 0 - 0 | 1 - 2 |
| CSA | 0 : 4 | Bahia | 0 - 2 | 0 - 5 | — |

| Final | | | Scores | | |
| | Points | | 1st leg | 2nd leg | Tie-break |
|---|---|---|---|---|---|
| Ceará | 2 : 2 | Bahia | 0 - 0 | 2 - 2 | 1 - 2 |

=== Northern Group ===
| Semi-Finals | | | Scores | | |
| | Points | | 1st leg | 2nd leg | Tie-break |
|---|---|---|---|---|---|
| Tuna Luso | 2 : 2 | Ferroviário | 3 - 1 | 1 - 3 | 1 - 0 |
| Auto Esporte Clube | 0 : 4 | Sport Recife | 0 - 3 | 2 - 5 | — |

| Final | | | Scores | |
| | Points | | 1st leg | 2nd leg |
|---|---|---|---|---|
| Tuna Luso | 1 : 3 | Sport Recife | 2 - 2 | 1 - 3 |

=== Northern Zone Final ===
| | | | Scores | | |
| | Points | | 1st leg | 2nd leg | Tie-break |
|---|---|---|---|---|---|
| Bahia | 2 : 2 | Sport Recife | 3 - 2 | 0 - 6 | 2 - 0 |

== Southern Zone ==
=== Southern Group ===
| Semi-Finals | | | Scores | |
| | Points | | 1st leg | 2nd leg |
|---|---|---|---|---|
| Atlético-PR | 4 : 0 | Hercíllo Luz | 2 - 1 | 1 - 0 |
| Grêmio | w / o | Bye | — | — |

| Final | | | Scores | |
| | Points | | 1st leg | 2nd leg |
|---|---|---|---|---|
| Grêmio | 4 : 0 | Atlético-PR | 1 - 0 | 1 - 0 |

=== Eastern Group ===
| Semi-Finals | | | Scores | |
| | Points | | 1st leg | 2nd leg |
|---|---|---|---|---|
| Rio Branco-ES | 4 : 0 | Manufatora | 3 - 0 | 1 - 0 |
| Atlético Mineiro | w / o | Bye | — | — |

| Final | | | Scores | |
| | Points | | 1st leg | 2nd leg |
|---|---|---|---|---|
| Rio Branco-ES | 1 : 3 | Atlético Mineiro | 2 - 2 | 1 - 2 |

=== Southern Zone Final ===
| | | | Scores | |
| | Points | | 1st leg | 2nd leg |
|---|---|---|---|---|
| Atlético Mineiro | 0 : 4 | Grêmio | 1 - 4 | 0 - 1 |

== National Semi-Finals ==
Santos and Vasco da Gama entered at this point.

| | | | Scores | | |
| | Points | | 1st leg | 2nd leg | Tie-break |
|---|---|---|---|---|---|
| Santos | 3 : 1 | Grêmio | 4 - 1 | 0 - 0 | — |
| Vasco da Gama | 2 : 2 | Bahia | 0 - 1 | 2 - 1 | 0 - 1 |

== National Final ==
| | | | Scores | | |
| | Points | | 1st leg | 2nd leg | Tie-break |
|---|---|---|---|---|---|
| Santos | 2 : 2 | Bahia | 2 - 3 | 2 - 0 | 1 - 3 |

The tie-break was played in Maracanã Stadium, in Rio de Janeiro, on 29 March 1960. Bahia: Nadinho; Beto, Henrique, Flávio and Neizinho; Vicente and Mário; Marito, Alencar, Léo and Biriba. Santos: Lalá; Getúlio, Mauro Ramos de Oliveira, Formiga and Zé Carlos; Zito and Mário; Dorval, Pagão (Tite), Coutinho and Pepe. Goals: Vicente, Léo and Alencar (Bahia) and Coutinho (Santos) Expulsions: Getúlio, Formiga and Dorval. Referee: Frederico Lopes, assisted by Airton Vieira de Morais (named "Sansão") and Wilson Lopes de Souza.
