= Aída Curi =

Brazilian murder victim (1939–1958)

- Born: Aída Jacob Curi; 15 December 1939; Belo Horizonte, Brazil
- Died: 14 July 1958 (aged 18); Rio de Janeiro, Brazil
- Cause of death: Murder
- Occupations: Student and worker
- Parent(s): Gattás Assad Curi and Jamila Jacob Curi

Aída Jacob Curi (Belo Horizonte, December 15, 1939 – Rio de Janeiro – July 14, 1958) was a Brazilian girl murdered in the Copacabana neighborhood, Rio de Janeiro.

== Biography ==
Aída Jacob Curi was the third of five children of a couple of immigrants from Syria, Gattás Assad Curi and Jamila Jacob Curi, who belonged to the Melkite Greek Catholic Church. At the age of five, Aída lost her father, which made her mother move to Rio de Janeiro and work. At the time, all of her brothers — Nelson, Roberto, Maurício and Waldir — were under ten years old, with the exception of the eldest son. Dona Jamila went with her children to Escola Moreira do Riachuelo, and remained there for eight years. At the age of six, Aída was sent to study at a school run by Spanish nuns, part of the Filhas de São José congregation, Educandário Gonçalves de Araújo, a boarding school for orphaned girls, in São Cristóvão. She studied there for the next twelve years. After this period, the young woman left Educandário to start her life abroad. At the time of her death, Aída was taking typing, English and Portuguese courses, and working in her brother's store.

Aída Curi was a fervently practicing Roman Catholic and her motto was to die rather than sin.

== Aída's murder ==
On July 14, 1958, Aída was walking with a classmate on Rua Miguel Lemos after leaving the typing class at Escola Remington, when the two were approached by some boys: Ronaldo Castro, nineteen years old, Cássio Murilo, seventeen, and the doorman Antônio Sousa, 27. At a certain point, Aída left her friend and tried to recover objects that had been taken from her by the young people — her glasses and her purse, which contained the money for the vehicle. Their strategy was to use her belongings to lure her to the building, the Rio Nobre Building on Avenida Atlântica. It was premeditated sexual violence — known at the time as "curra". Aida was pulled into the elevator and, screaming, reached the top of the building. A newspaper at the time reported that it was in an apartment on the twelfth floor, still in the finishing phase, that the attackers fought to immobilize Aída. Ronaldo and Cássio were helped by the building's doorman, Antônio.

According to witnesses, Aída was forcibly taken by Ronaldo Castro and Cássio Murilo to the top of the Rio Nobre Building, on Avenida Atlântica, where the two boys were helped by doorman Antônio Sousa to sexually abuse the young woman. For thirty minutes, the young woman was beaten with great violence, in addition to the attackers trying to rape her. The victim reportedly fell unconscious due to physical exhaustion. To cover up the crime, the attackers threw the young woman from the terrace on the twelfth floor of the building, trying to simulate suicide. Aída died as a result of the fall. There were three trials. In the end, Ronaldo Castro was cleared of the murder charge, being convicted only of indecent assault and attempted rape. His sentence was eight years and nine months. The doorman, Antônio Sousa, also cleared of the murder charge but convicted of the others, disappeared. Nothing more was heard of him. Cássio Murilo, a minor at the time of the crime, was convicted of Aída's murder and sent to the Minor Assistance System (SAM), from where he left straight to perform military service.

=== The defendants ===
- Ronaldo Guilherme de Souza Castro: born in Espírito Santo, lived and studied in Rio de Janeiro, was nineteen years old at the time of the crime. He belonged to a traditional family. He had a bad reputation in the neighborhood and at school. He was always a bad student, he got very low grades, he failed at school. He had been expelled from schools, accused of several assaults and having participated in the theft of a car belonging to the Department of Agriculture. He had also been arrested for indiscipline when he served in the Army and similar things. Ronaldo's cousin, Mariza Eneider Castro, said that the young assassin was debauched, had made her suffer several times and that, above all, he was burglar. Disregarding the family robberies, he is the author of the theft of jewelry and money from a guesthouse in Lagoa Rodrigo de Freitas. The crime was discovered, but his father's money silenced the police and compensated the victims. The girl said that once, in Vitória, Espírito Santo, her cousin tried to hand her over for 20 thousand cruises to a guy known as "Mãozinha". Ten thousand cruises would be for him, Ronaldo Castro, the other ten for her. He also stated that his cousin's father covered up his delinquent son's nonsense through bribes. Mariza also said that she felt guilty for not having revealed the facts sooner and that she only kept it confidential at the request of Ronaldo's parents.
- Cássio Murilo Ferreira: He was the nephew of the building manager. He had already been expelled from the Ensign's Gymnasium for bad behavior, he had also been expelled from another school for trying to lift the girls' skirts and he had already broken down the door of a building next to the one he lived in to steal a scooter. The young man was a minor at the time of the crime, he was sixteen years old.
- Antônio João de Sousa: he was the doorman at the Rio-Nobre Building, where the crime occurred. He was 26 years old at the time. Little has been said about his life.

== Investigations ==
According to the medical report from the autopsy, carried out by coroner Mário Martins Rodrigues, from the Legal Medical Institute, Aída died a virgin. The sexual abuse was never consummated. According to the report, the victim's body showed abrasions and bruises caused by nails and punches. On the chest, on the left side, there are signs of deep nails. Scratches on the thighs, belly, neck and bruises on the abdomen. There was an internal rupture of the upper lip due to a punch. Strangulation attempts. Signs of severe trauma to the chin. Marks on the arms, forearms, wrists and back of the hands (meaning "defensive wounds"). Some marks on the chest that could be the result of a bite. The young woman's clothes were examined in the laboratories of the Criminalistics Institute of the Federal Department of Public Security. In order to reconstruct the crime scene, experts found that for thirty minutes the young woman was subjected to cruel suffering, violence and beatings.

The criminal experts made it very clear in their reports that, to bring Aída to a state of exhaustion, a single attacker, even using a lot of violence, would not be enough. It would take at least two people acting simultaneously to beat Aída until she passed out. The coroner, Mário Martins Rodrigues, declared that he did not find any state of organic weakness in the victim. The young woman would not easily be led to a state of "stress", that is, total exhaustion. Ronaldo claimed to have left the building to meet a girl called Zilza Maria Fonseca at 8:15 pm, well before Aída's body was thrown from the terrace. Expert Murilo Vieira Sampaio calculated, with the greatest possible accuracy, the duration of the crime on the terrace, according to the timing taken during the reconstruction of the crime. This timing showed that there was no way Ronaldo could have left the terrace at 8:15 pm to meet the faker. This is because at 8:20 pm he was still hanging around the Rio-Nobre Building next to Aída, trying to find a place to take her to practice curra. There are several people who have seen them; one of them, Luiz Beethoven Cabral Leme, who presented himself to the police to say that he was on Rua Miguel Lemos accompanied by two young women, Suely Weydt and Ivani Prado. That was when another boy, a corporal at Fort Copacabana, Amaury Freire, passed by, and Luiz Leme asked the time. It was 8:20 pm. A few moments later, the three saw Ronaldo pass by Aída.

=== Attempts to defraud the process ===
==== Alleged suicide ====
The defense presented a version stating that Aída had killed herself, throwing herself from the 12th floor to escape the attack by Ronaldo, Cássio and Antônio, the doorman. However, there was evidence that refuted this version and led us to believe that the girl was actually murdered and did not commit suicide. Among the evidence is the blood-stained handkerchief found in the young woman's bag. Aída's autopsy revealed injuries to her lips, resulting from Ronaldo's slap, confirmed by himself. Furthermore, Ronaldo confessed, in court, to having torn Aída's skirt and all her underwear. The young woman's petticoat was found covered in blood. Other signs are the punctate, semicircle wounds on the face, the diameter of which coincides with that of the doorman's ring. However, all of this was disregarded by the jury. On the outer wall of the terrace's parapet, experts found marks left by Aída's sandals, which scraped when she was thrown from above, proving that she had not thrown herself. The body fell close to the building.

==== Changes to the crime scene ====
There were signs that the criminals altered the crime scene. Aída's books fell or were placed right next to the victim's body, as if she had jumped from the building with them. However, it would be unlikely that she would still have the books in her hands after thirty minutes of violence and intense struggle against three attackers.

==== False testimony ====
Ronaldo's father, Edgard Castro, would have hired a young woman named Zilza Maria Fonseca as his son's alibi. She said she was talking to Ronaldo on a bench on Avenida Atlântica when Aída was thrown. However, the girl hired did not attend the trial. Instead, the defense preferred to take another witness: Lecy Gomes Lopes, who claimed to have seen Zilza with Ronaldo at the time of the crime. Leading society to question: "Why did they bring the woman who 'saw' Zilza instead of Zilza?" .According to the magazine O Cruzeiro, Ronaldo's testimony and Lecy's were contradictory. She stated that she was walking with her daughter and the maid, and sat on a bench on Avenida Atlântica, facing Rua Djalma Ulrich, where a couple, Ronaldo Castro and Zilza Maria Fonseca, were already there. Ronaldo, on the other hand, stated in his statement that he was walking along the beach with Zilza and that, when the two arrived at the bench, there was already a lady, a girl and a three-year-old child there. Furthermore, Lecy describes Zilza as blonde, but she was brunette. She also stated that Zilza sang a song by Maysa, who talked a lot about "you". The song would be "Because of you" which Maysa only recorded in 1959, after the crime.

==== Judgments ====
In Ronaldo Castro's first trial he was sentenced to 37 and a half years in prison, 25 years for Aída's death, the remainder for indecent assault and attempted rape. The doorman Antônio Sousa was sentenced to thirty years and Cássio, considered the real murderer, could not be tried because he was a minor. The defense appealed and was granted a second trial which took place in March 1959. During Ronaldo's new trial, lawyer Romeiro Neto questioned the coroner, Mário Martins Rodrigues, regarding certain injuries found on Aída Curi's breasts. I wanted to know if they were teeth marks or not. As doubts arose at the time, Raimundo Rodrigues, an expert professor of dentistry at the National Faculty of Dentistry, was called in, who carried out examinations of the suspected injuries, took plaster! models of the injuries and carried out the necessary technical expert studies. Once the plaster tests were completed, the dental expert moved on to the second phase of the process: examining the defendants' dental arches. At the request of the Juvenile Judge, Cássio was examined in the laboratories of the National Faculty of Dentistry, and the examination proved that the juvenile delinquent was not the author of the bites on Aída's bust. Cássio Murilo was innocent in the biting case. It remained for the expert to examine the arches of Ronaldo Castro and those of the doorman Antônio Sousa. However, this examination was interrupted by deliberate order from Judge Souza Netto. When questioned, the judge stated that if Ronaldo left the building at 8:15 pm, according to the incontrovertible testimonial evidence in the case file, it was not important for his trial to carry out these tests, because it was proven by the testimony of the witnesses that he only slapped Aída, not He scratched her with his nails, didn't bite her and didn't throw her from the top of the building.

Ronaldo was acquitted of the murder charge and only received the sentence for the other two crimes. The jury judged that the only person responsible for the victim's death was Cássio, also exempting the doorman from blame.

Because he was a minor and could not be charged, Cássio Murilo was sent to the Minor Assistance System (SAM), from where he left straight to perform military service. A few years later, he was accused of killing a car watchman. He fled abroad until the sentence for the murder was prescribed. Cássio would have been murdered in 1978, in an incident. There was also a third trial, in which Ronaldo was tried for simple murder and attempted rape and sentenced to six years in prison. After appealing the sentence, prosecutor Pedro Henrique Miranda managed to have the sentence increased to eight years and nine months. After serving his sentence, Ronaldo was released. He would later become a businessman in his state, Espírito Santo.

== Popular culture ==
Aída's name is mentioned by Rita Lee in the final part of the song "Todas as Mulheres do Mundo", as well as in the song "Mônica", written by Angela Ro Ro, which deals with a similar theme. In 2004, Rede Globo's Linha Direta Justiça program presented a reconstruction of the murder of Aída Curi. The airing of this program led the victim's family to file a compensation suit against Globo, for reviving a "sinister notoriety that had haunted them for so many years [sic]". The request was denied in the lower courts and the action was judged and also denied by the Federal Supreme Court on February 11, 2021. The process, which took place for almost two decades, became known as the "Right to be Forgotten Action". The decision was nine votes against and one in favor. According to the majority's understanding, if the action were accepted, it would set precedents for a possible curtailment of the right to information and freedom of the press.

=== Streets named after her ===
Aída has some streets named after her in the state of Rio and throughout the rest of the country:

- Rua Aída Curi: in Rio de Janeiro at Taquara, in Jacarepaguá.
- Rua Aída Curi: in Queimados (RJ) in the Jardim Guanabara neighborhood.
- Rua Aída Curi: in São Gonçalo (RJ) in the Raul Veiga neighborhood.
- Rua Aída Curi: in Ipirá (BA) in the city center.
