= Walter Zastrau =

German footballer (born 1935)

Personal information
- Date of birth: 30 May 1935 (age 91)
- Position: Defender

Senior career*
Years	Team	Apps	(Gls)
1955–1959	Rot-Weiss Essen	98	(2)
1959–1962	Schalke 04	53	(0)
1962–1964	VfL Bochum	48	(1)
Total		199	(3)

International career
1956–1957	West Germany U23	2	(0)
1958	West Germany B	1	(0)
1958	West Germany	1	(0)
- * Club domestic league appearances and goals

Walter Zastrau (born 30 May 1935) is a German retired professional footballer who played as a defender.

== Career statistics ==
Appearances and goals by club, season and competition
Club	Season	League			DFB-Pokal		Europe		Total	
Club	Season	Division	Apps	Goals	Apps	Goals	Apps	Goals	Apps	Goals
Rot-Weiss Essen	1955–56	Oberliga West	13	0	—		1	0	14	0
Rot-Weiss Essen	1956–57	Oberliga West	26	0	—		—		26	0
Rot-Weiss Essen	1957–58	Oberliga West	30	2	—		—		30	2
Rot-Weiss Essen	1958–59	Oberliga West	29	0	—		—		29	0
Schalke 04	1959–60	Oberliga West	22	0	—		—		22	0
Schalke 04	1960–61	Oberliga West	16	0	—		—		16	0
Schalke 04	1961–62	Oberliga West	15	0	0	0	—		15	0
VfL Bochum	1962–63	2. Oberliga West	29	0	—		—		29	0
VfL Bochum	1963–64	Verbandsliga Westfalen	19	1	—		—		19	1
Career total			199	3	0	0	1	0	200	3
