= 1958 in Brazilian football =

Football in Brazil
- Season: 1958

The following article presents a summary of the 1958 football (soccer) season in Brazil, which was the 57th season of competitive football in the country.

== Torneio Rio-São Paulo ==
Final Standings

Position	Team	Points	Played	Won	Drawn	Lost	For	Against	Difference
1	Vasco da Gama	15	9	7	1	1	26	12	14
2	Flamengo	13	9	6	1	2	24	15	9
3	Corinthians	11	9	4	3	2	14	11	3
4	São Paulo	10	9	4	2	3	28	19	9
5	Botafogo	8	9	3	2	4	21	25	-4
6	Fluminense	8	9	3	2	4	10	16	-6
7	Santos	7	9	3	1	5	24	24	0
8	Palmeiras	6	9	3	0	6	22	28	-6
9	América	6	9	3	0	6	15	25	-10
10	Portuguesa	6	9	2	2	5	13	22	-9

Vasco da Gama declared as the Torneio Rio-São Paulo champions.

== State championship champions ==
State	Champion	State	Champion
Acre	Independência	Paraíba	Auto Esporte
Alagoas	CSA	Paraná	Atlético Paranaense
Amapá	Macapá	Pernambuco	Sport Recife
Amazonas	Santos-AM	Piauí	River
Bahia	Bahia	Rio de Janeiro	Manufatora
Ceará	Ceará	Rio de Janeiro (DF)	Vasco
Espírito Santo	Rio Branco-ES	Rio Grande do Norte	ABC
Goiás	Goiânia	Rio Grande do Sul	Grêmio
Maranhão	Ferroviário-MA	Rondônia	Ferroviário-RO
Mato Grosso	Dom Bosco	Santa Catarina	Hercílio Luz
Minas Gerais	Atlético Mineiro	São Paulo	Santos
Pará	Tuna Luso	Sergipe	Santa Cruz-SE

== Brazil national team ==
The following table lists all the games played by the Brazil national football team in official competitions and friendly matches during 1958.

Date	Opposition	Result	Score	Brazil scorers	Competition
May 4, 1958	Paraguay	W	5-1	Zagallo (2), Vavá, Dida, Pelé	Taça Oswaldo Cruz
May 7, 1958	Paraguay	D	0-0	-	Taça Oswaldo Cruz
May 14, 1958	Bulgaria	W	4-0	Moacir (2), Dida, Joel	International Friendly
May 18, 1958	Bulgaria	W	3-1	Pelé (2), Pepe	International Friendly
May 21, 1958	(Brazil) Corinthians	W	5-0	Mazola, Pepe (2), Garrincha (2)	International Friendly (unofficial match)
May 29, 1958	(Italy) Fiorentina	W	4-0	Mazola (2), Garrincha, Pepe	International Friendly (unofficial match)
June 1, 1958	(Italy) Internazionale	W	4-0	Dino Sani, Mazola, Dida, Zagallo	International Friendly (unofficial match)
June 8, 1958	Austria	W	3-0	Mazola (2), Nílton Santos	World Cup
June 11, 1958	England	D	0-0	-	World Cup
June 15, 1958	Soviet Union	W	2-0	Vavá (2)	World Cup
June 19, 1958	Wales	W	1-0	Pelé	World Cup
June 24, 1958	France	W	5-2	Vavá, Didi, Pelé (3)	World Cup
June 29, 1958	Sweden	W	5-2	Vavá (2), Pelé (2), Zagallo	World Cup
