= Walter Marciano =

Brazilian footballer (1931–1961)

Personal information
- Full name: Walter Marciano de Queirós
- Date of birth: 15 September 1931
- Place of birth: Santos, Brazil
- Date of death: 21 June 1961 (aged 29)
- Place of death: El Saler Highway, Valencia, Spain
- Position: Forward

Senior career*
Years	Team	Apps	(Gls)
1950	São Caetano		
1951–1952	Ypiranga-SP		
1953–1955	Santos	114	(45)
1955–1957	Vasco da Gama		
1957–1961	Valencia	81	(26)
Total		195	(71)

International career
1955–1956	Brazil	7	(0)
- * Club domestic league appearances and goals

Walter Marciano de Queirós (15 September 1931 – 21 June 1961) was a Brazilian footballer. He was capped seven times by Brazil. He died in a car crash in 1961.

== Career statistics ==
=== Club ===
Appearances and goals by club, season and competition
Club	Season	League			Cup		Other		Total	
Club	Season	Division	Apps	Goals	Apps	Goals	Apps	Goals	Apps	Goals
Valencia	1957–58	La Liga	25	13	0	0	0	0	25	13
Valencia	1958–59	La Liga	24	7	0	0	0	0	24	7
Valencia	1959–60	La Liga	25	4	5 (Note: Appearances in the Copa del Generalísimo)	1	0	0	30	5
Valencia	1960–61	La Liga	7	2	5	0	0	0	12	2
Career total			81	26	10	1	0	0	91	27

=== International ===
Appearances and goals by national team and year
National team	Year	Apps	Goals
Brazil	1955	2	0
Brazil	1956	5	0
Total		7	0
