= Guy Sénac =

French footballer (1932–2019)

Personal information
- Date of birth: 19 March 1933
- Place of birth: Villetaneuse, France
- Date of death: 13 January 2019 (aged 85)
- Position: Defender

Senior career*
Years	Team	Apps	(Gls)
1952–1963	RC Paris		
1963–1968	Lens		

International career
1960–1961	France	2	(0)
- * Club domestic league appearances and goals

Guy Sénac (19 March 1933 – 13 January 2019) was a French football defender that played on the Division 1 from Villetaneuse. He is the father of Didier Sénac. Guy was selected twice for the French team.

== Biography ==
Guy Sénac was born on 19 March 1933 in Villetaneuse. He would join Racing Club de Paris in 1952. Over his career he would score 42 top-flight goals and play 347 games. In 1963 he would leave Racing Club de Paris to join RC Lens. Sénac died on Sunday 13 January 2019, and was buried in Avenue Van Pelt in Lens.

== Games ==
- Racing Club de France (1961-1962)
- Racing Club de France (1962-1963)
- RC Lens (1963-1964)
- RC Lens (1964-1965)
- RC Lens (1965-1966)
- RC Lens (1966-1967)
- RC Lens (1967-1968)
- World Cup Qualifiers (11 December 1962)
- RC Lens (July 1963 - June 1968)
- Racing Club de France (July 1952 - June 1963)
- Qualifier CM Europe
- Friendlies
