= Basilica of St. Joseph the Worker, Barbacena =

Coordinates: 21.2242°S 43.7658°W

Basilica of St. Joseph the Worker
- Basílica São José Operário
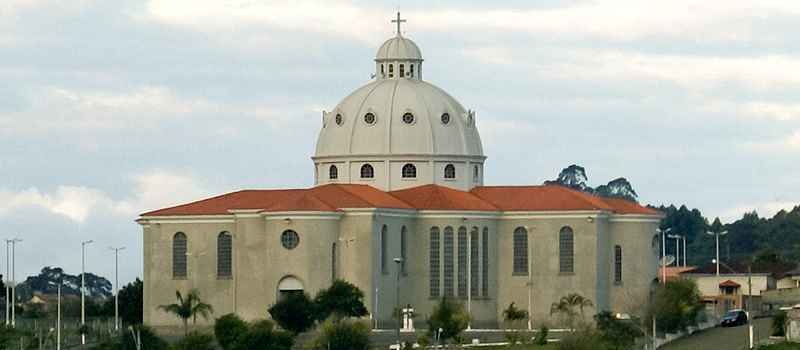
- Basilica of St. Joseph the Worker
- Location: Barbacena
- Country: Brazil
- Denomination: Roman Catholic Church

Architecture
- Years built: 1950–1958

Administration
- Archdiocese: Roman Catholic Archdiocese of Mariana

The Basilica of St. Joseph the Worker (or the Basilica of Barbacena; Portuguese: Basílica São José Operário) is a Catholic church located in Barbacena, Minas Gerais, Brazil. Built in 1950 and finished around 1958, its plan has the shape of a Greek cross. It was elevated to the status of basilica on September 25, 1965, and registered by Municipal Decree No. 3908 of May 21, 1999. It belongs to the Archdiocese of Mariana and its current parish priest is Canon Antonio Eustaquio Barbosa. The basilica has a privileged view of the whole city and can be seen from anywhere in the city.

The Basilica of St. Joseph the Worker was initially designed to be a small replica of St. Peter's Basilica in the Vatican, in Rome. Likely due to lack of money, it has only the shape of a Greek cross. The basilica has modern architecture and inside has motifs of the Renaissance and Baroque period.

== See also ==
- Roman Catholicism in Brazil
- St. Joseph the Worker
