= Ziza (footballer) =

Brazilian footballer

Personal information
- Full name: José Lázaro Robles Júnior
- Date of birth: 26 April 1950 (age 76)
- Place of birth: São Paulo, Brazil
- Position: Left winger

Youth career
- 1965–1969: Juventus-SP

Senior career*
Years	Team	Apps	(Gls)
1970–1974	Juventus-SP		
1975–1977	Guarani	157	(31)
1977–1979	Atlético Mineiro	157	(84)
1979–1982	Botafogo	116	(11)
1982	Inter de Limeira		

Managerial career
- 1999–2000: Al Ahli (Doha)
- 2001: Al Ahli (Doha)
- 2006: Al Ahli (Doha)
- 2006–2007: Al Ahli (Doha)
- 2009–2010: Al Ahli (Doha)
- * Club domestic league appearances and goals as of 7 January 2024

José Lázaro Robles Júnior (born 26 April 1950), better known as Ziza, is a Brazilian former professional footballer and manager, who played as a left winger.

== Career ==
Son of Pinga, just like his father, he started his career at Juventus. After almost moving to FC Porto, he ended up going to Guarani de Campinas, where he won the Silver Ball in 1975 and was the team's highlight in winning the first round of the 1976 Campeonato Paulista. At the request of coach Barbatana, he was taken to Atlético Mineiro. There he made 157 appearances and scored 84 goals, which earned him a call-up to the Brazil national football team, although due to a knee injury, he did not take to the field. In 1979 he transferred to Botafogo, but without being able to repeat the success achieved in previous teams. He ended his career for good in 1982, at Inter de Limeira.

== Personal life ==
Ziza arrived in Qatar as Pepe’s technical assistant in 1984. He has lived in the country since then, accumulating stints in various positions at clubs, especially at Al-Ahli and El-Jaish.

== Honours ==
Juventus

- Asahi International Soccer Tournament: 1974

Atlético Mineiro

- Campeonato Mineiro: 1978, 1979
- Copa dos Campeões da Copa Brasil: 1978

Individual

- 1975 Bola de Prata
