= Tinazzi =

Tinazzi is a surname. It may refer to:

- Fabio Tinazzi (born 1983), Italian football player
- Giorgio Tinazzi (1934–2016), Italian football player
- Marcel Tinazzi (born 1953), French road bicycle racer of Italian parents
- Pierlucio Tinazzi (1962–1999), Italian security guard who perished while rescuing survivors of the 1999 Mont Blanc tunnel
