= Associação Desportiva Niterói =

AD Niterói
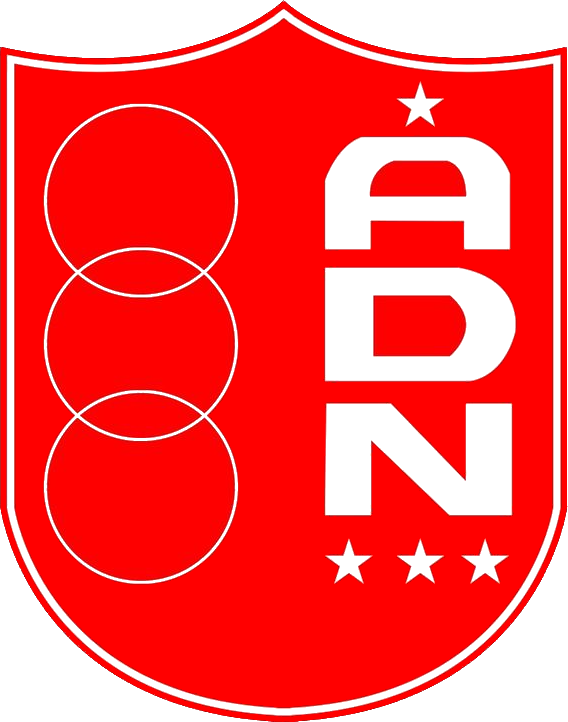
- Full name: Associação Desportiva Niterói
- Founded: April 11, 1944
- Dissolved: 1983
- Ground: Assad Abdala
- Capacity: 3 000
Home colors	Away colors

Associação Desportiva Niterói was a brazilian football club from Niterói, Rio de Janeiro, which was founded on April 11, 1944 and dissolved in 1983. The team competed in the Campeonato Carioca from 1979 to 1981 and participated in the first Taça Brasil in 1959.

== History ==
The team was founded as Manufatora Atlético Clube by the workers of the Cia. Manufatora Fluminense de Tecidos, in the Barreto neighborhood. From the 1950s, it started to participate in the Campeonato Fluminense, winning it for the first time in 1958, after beating Rio Branco de Campos in the finals, and thus was the first Fluminense representative in the Taça Brasil. In its only participation, it was eliminated in the first stage, with two losses against Espírito Santo's Rio Branco.

In 1977, it won the Fluminense championship again, defeating Itaboraí in the finals. In the next year, it changed its name to Associação Desportiva Niterói, and was included in the unified Campeonato Carioca in 1979, but with the team realizing consistently poor performances, it was relegated in 1981, and dissolved in 1983.

== Titles ==
- Campeonato Fluminense: 1958, 1977
- Niterói City Championship: 1963, 1969, 1970
