= 1952 Torneio Rio-São Paulo =

Torneio Rio-São Paulo
- Season: 1952
- Champions: Portuguesa (1st title)
- Matches played: 47
- Goals scored: 182 (3.87 per match)
- Top goalscorer: Pinga (Portuguesa) – 12 goals
- Biggest away win: Bangu 0–5 Corinthians (23 Mar)

The 1952 Torneio Rio São Paulo was the 6th edition of the Torneio Rio-São Paulo. It was disputed between 2 February to 19 June.

== Participants ==
Team	City	Nº participations	Best result
Bangu	Rio de Janeiro	4	3rd (1951)
Botafogo	Rio de Janeiro	3	6th (1951)
Corinthians	(São Paulo (state)) São Paulo	6	Champions: 1950
Flamengo	Rio de Janeiro	5	4th (1951)
Fluminense	Rio de Janeiro	5	7th (1933)
Palmeiras	(São Paulo (state)) São Paulo	6	Champions: 1933, 1951
Portuguesa	(São Paulo (state)) São Paulo	6	3rd (1933, 1950)
Santos	(São Paulo (state)) Santos	3	9th (1933)
São Paulo	(São Paulo (state)) São Paulo	6	Runners-up: 1933
Vasco da Gama	Rio de Janeiro	6	Runners-up: 1950

== Format ==
The tournament were disputed in a single round-robin format, with the club with most points conquered being the champions.

== Tournament ==
Following is the summary of the 1952 Torneio Rio-São Paulo tournament:

Pos	Team	Pld	W	D	L	GF	GA	GD	Pts	Qualification
1	(São Paulo (state)) Portuguesa	9	5	1	3	23	16	+7	11	Tiebreaker playoff
2	Vasco da Gama	9	4	3	2	15	14	+1	11	Tiebreaker playoff
3	(São Paulo (state)) Corinthians	9	5	0	4	21	15	+6	10 (Note: Tied in points)	
4	Fluminense	9	4	2	3	20	17	+3	10	
5	(São Paulo (state)) Santos	9	5	0	4	20	19	+1	10	
6	Botafogo	9	3	2	4	13	13	0	8 (Note: Tied in points)	
7	(São Paulo (state)) São Paulo	9	3	2	4	15	18	−3	8	
8	(São Paulo (state)) Palmeiras	9	3	2	4	12	15	−3	8	
9	Bangu	9	2	4	3	19	25	−6	8	
10	Flamengo	9	2	2	5	14	20	−6	6	

Source: RSSSF
Rules for classification: 1) points; 2) wins; 3) goal difference; 4) goals for.

=== Tiebreaker playoff ===
Following is the info about the tiebreaker playoff:

15 June 1952

Portuguesa (São Paulo (state))	4–2	Vasco da Gama
Julinho 9'; Pinga 15'; Nininho 44', 55'		Ademir 32'; Maneca 49'

Pacaembu, São Paulo
Referee: Arthur Ellis

19 June 1952

Vasco da Gama	2–2	(São Paulo (state)) Portuguesa
Ademir 5'; Maneca 57'		Pinga 9', 15'

Maracanã, Rio de Janeiro
Attendance: 58,291
Referee: Sidney Jones
