= 1958 Torneio Rio-São Paulo =

Torneio Rio-São Paulo
- Season: 1958
- Champions: Vasco da Gama (1st title)
- Matches: 45
- Goals: 197 (4.38 per match)
- Top goalscorer: Gino Orlando (São Paulo) – 12 goals
- Biggest home win: Botafogo 7–3 America (12 Mar)

The 1958 Torneio Rio São Paulo was the 11th edition of the Torneio Rio-São Paulo. It was disputed between 26 February to 6 April. The tournament is remembered for being CR Vasco da Gama first title.

== Participants ==
Team	City	Nº participations	Best result
America	Rio de Janeiro	8	6th (1951)
Botafogo	Rio de Janeiro	8	3rd (1955)
Corinthians	(São Paulo (state)) São Paulo	11	Champions: 1950, 1953, 1954
Flamengo	Rio de Janeiro	10	Runners-up: 1957
Fluminense	Rio de Janeiro	10	Champions: 1957
Palmeiras	(São Paulo (state)) São Paulo	11	Champions: 1933, 1951
Portuguesa	(São Paulo (state)) São Paulo	11	Champions: 1952, 1955
Santos	(São Paulo (state)) Santos	8	4th (1957)
São Paulo	(São Paulo (state)) São Paulo	11	Runners-up: 1933
Vasco da Gama	Rio de Janeiro	11	Runners-up: 1950, 1952, 1953

== Format ==
The tournament were disputed in a single round-robin format, with the club with most points conquered being the champions.

== Tournament ==
Following is the summary of the 1958 Torneio Rio-São Paulo tournament:

Pos	Team	Pld	W	D	L	GF	GA	GD	Pts
1	Vasco da Gama (C)	9	7	1	1	26	12	+14	15
2	Flamengo	9	6	1	2	24	15	+9	13
3	(São Paulo (state)) Corinthians	9	4	3	2	14	11	+3	11
4	(São Paulo (state)) São Paulo	9	4	2	3	28	19	+9	10
5	Botafogo	9	3	2	4	21	25	−4	8 (Note: Tied in points)
6	Fluminense	9	3	2	4	10	16	−6	8
7	(São Paulo (state)) Santos	9	3	1	5	24	24	0	7
8	(São Paulo (state)) Palmeiras	9	3	0	6	22	28	−6	6 (Note: Tied in points)
9	America	9	3	0	6	15	25	−10	6
10	(São Paulo (state)) Portuguesa	9	2	2	5	13	22	−9	6

Source: RSSSF
Rules for classification: 1) points; 2) wins; 3) goal difference; 4) goals for.
(C) Champions
Notes:

Note: The match Botafogo 2–5 São Paulo, disputed 6 April 1958, is also valid for the Taça dos Campeões Estaduais Rio–São Paulo.
