= 1958 Campeonato Carioca =

Campeonato Carioca
- Season: 1958
- Champions: Vasco da Gama
- Taça Brasil: Vasco da Gama
- Matches played: 138
- Goals scored: 487 (3.53 per match)
- Top goalscorer: Quarentinha (Botafogo) – 20 goals
- Biggest home win: Flamengo 8-0 Olaria (August 24, 1958)
- Biggest away win: São Cristóvão 0-6 Fluminense (December 5, 1958)
- Highest scoring: São Cristóvão 5-5 Portuguesa (September 13, 1958)

The 1958 edition of the Campeonato Carioca kicked off on July 13, 1958 and ended on January 17, 1959. It was organized by FMF (Federação Metropolitana de Futebol, or Metropolitan Football Federation). Twelve teams participated. Vasco da Gama won the title for the 12th time. no teams were relegated.

== System ==
The tournament would be disputed in a double round-robin format, with the team with the most points winning the title.

== Championship ==
Pos	Team	Pld	W	D	L	GF	GA	GD	Pts	Qualification or relegation
1	Flamengo	22	14	4	4	61	23	+38	32	Playoffs
2	Botafogo	22	14	4	4	56	26	+30	32	Playoffs
3	Vasco da Gama	22	14	4	4	51	28	+23	32	Playoffs
4	Fluminense	22	13	4	5	41	18	+23	30	
5	América	22	12	5	5	37	23	+14	29	
6	Bangu	22	9	5	8	32	31	+1	23	
7	Portuguesa	22	9	2	11	42	50	−8	20	
8	São Cristóvão	22	7	4	11	29	49	−20	18	
9	Madureira	22	6	3	13	32	44	−12	15	
10	Canto do Rio	22	6	2	14	27	46	−19	14	
11	Bonsucesso	22	4	5	13	30	53	−23	13	
12	Olaria	22	2	3	17	21	72	−51	7	

Updated to match(es) played on December 14, 1958. Source: RSSSF.com
Rules for classification: 1) points; 2) goal difference; 3) wins; 4) number of goals scored.

=== Playoffs ===
As stipulated in the regulations, in case of two teams or more tying in points, the teams in question would dispute a playoff. since Vasco da Gama, Botafogo and Flamengo ended up tied, the playoffs would be disputed as a single round-robin tournament, popularly known as the "Supercampeonato". However, at the end of the tournament, the three tied in points again, forcing another playoff, known as the "Supersupercampeonato", to be held, which was won by Vasco da Gama.

Pos	Team	Pld	W	D	L	GF	GA	GD	Pts	Qualification or relegation
1	Vasco da Gama	2	1	0	1	2	1	+1	2	Playoffs
2	Botafogo	2	1	0	1	2	2	0	2	Playoffs
3	Flamengo	2	1	0	1	2	3	−1	2	Playoffs

Updated to match(es) played on January 3, 1959. Source: RSSSF.com
Rules for classification: 1) points; 2) goal difference; 3) wins; 4) number of goals scored.

Pos	Team	Pld	W	D	L	GF	GA	GD	Pts	Qualification or relegation
1	Vasco da Gama	2	1	1	0	3	2	+1	3	Champions
2	Flamengo	2	1	0	1	3	3	0	2	
3	Botafogo	2	0	1	1	3	4	−1	1	

Updated to match(es) played on January 17, 1959. Source: RSSSF.com
Rules for classification: 1) points; 2) goal difference; 3) wins; 4) number of goals scored.
