= Tournoi de Paris =

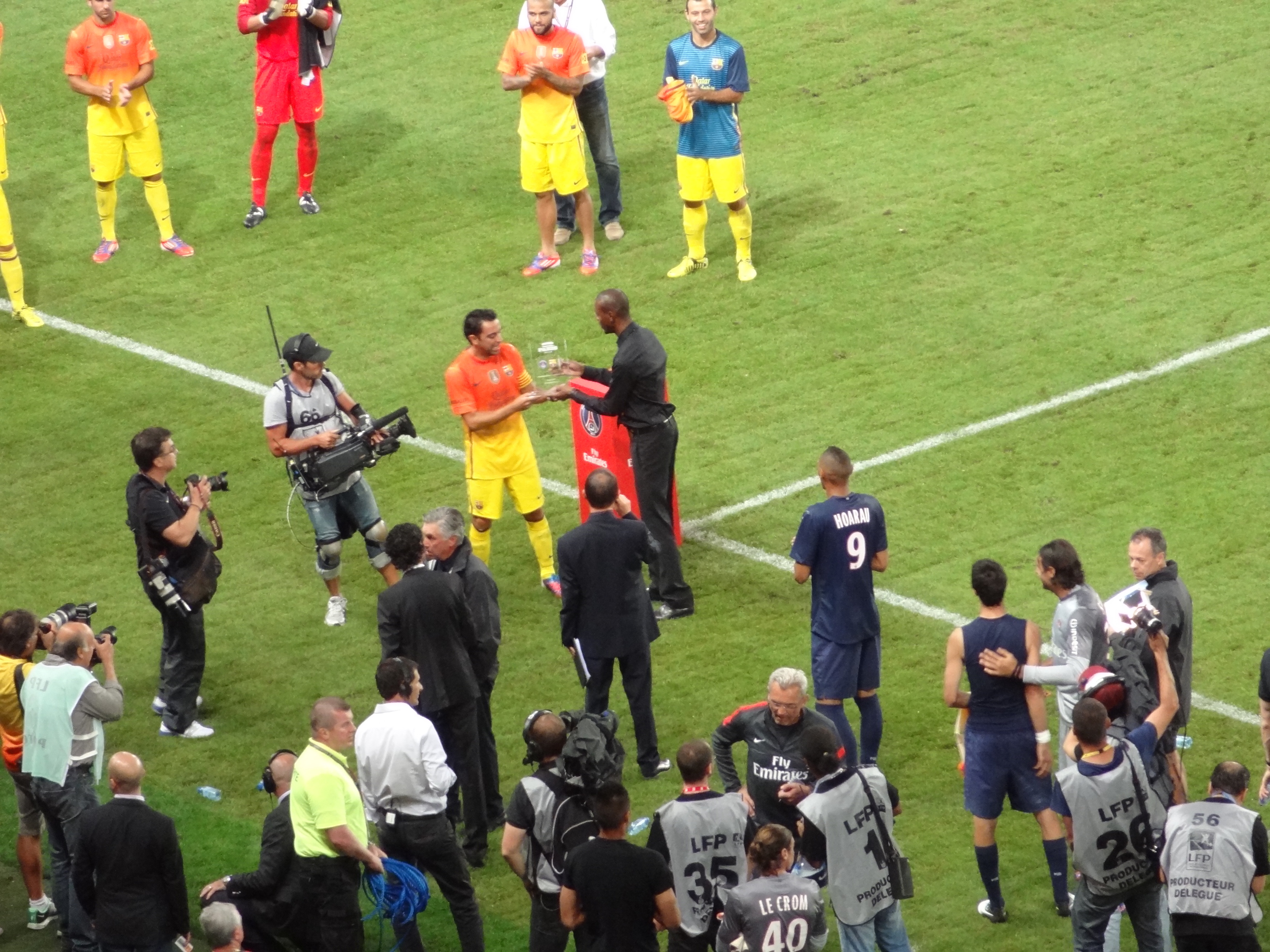
- Barcelona player Xavi receiving the trophy in 2012.
- Organiser(s): (France) Paris Saint-Germain
- Founded: 1957; 69 years ago
- Abolished: 2012; 14 years ago
- Teams: 4 (1957–2010), 2 (2012)
- Last champions: (Spain) Barcelona (1st title)
- Most championships: (France) Paris Saint-Germain (7 titles)

The Tournoi de Paris, also known as the Trophée de Paris, was an invitational football competition organized by French club Paris Saint-Germain at their home ground, the Parc des Princes in Paris, France. The tournament was founded in 1957 by former host club Racing Club de France Football to celebrate their 25th anniversary. It is considered by many to be the precursor to the Intercontinental Cup and FIFA Club World Cup.

Considered the most prestigious friendly tournament in French football, the Tournoi de Paris was initially organized by Racing CF between 1957 and 1966. It returned briefly in 1973 under new organizers Paris FC, before PSG successfully relaunched the competition in 1975. Abandoned in 1993 for financial reasons, PSG revived it in 2010 to mark the club's 40th anniversary. Renamed the Trophée de Paris in 2012, this was the final edition to date.

Vasco da Gama won the inaugural Tournoi de Paris in 1957, while Barcelona won the last edition in 2012. PSG are the most successful club in the competition's history, with seven titles. Anderlecht follows with three, while Racing, Santos and Fluminense are the only other teams to win the competition more than once, with two titles each. PSG's bitter rivals, Olympique de Marseille, are among the clubs to have won the tournament once.

== History ==
=== From Racing to PSG ===
The Tournoi de Paris was founded in 1957 by former hosts Racing Club de France Football to celebrate their 25th anniversary. They invited European champions Real Madrid, Brazilian team Vasco da Gama and German side Rot-Weiss Essen to the tournament held at the Parc des Princes. Its inaugural edition, won by Vasco after defeating Alfredo Di Stéfano's Real Madrid in the final, is reportedly one of the factors that led to the creation of the Intercontinental Cup in 1960 and subsequently the FIFA Club World Cup in 2000.

From 1957 to 1993, four teams, including the host, played in a knockout format. The Tournoi de Paris featured two semi-finals, a third-place play-off and a final. The tournament was held annually every summer between 1957 and 1966 by Racing CF. It returned briefly in 1973, with Paris FC as the new hosts. After the latter's failed attempt, Paris Saint-Germain and their president Daniel Hechter successfully revived the competition in 1975. Reinforced for the occasion by Dutch legend Johan Cruyff, PSG narrowly lost Valencia in the final in front of a sold-out Parc des Princes. The following edition fared worse, as PSG lost both matches and finished last.

=== PSG hegemony ===
The 1978 edition, just weeks before the 1978 FIFA World Cup, proved to be the most uneven of all, as PSG invited the Netherlands national football team. The latter won the competition easily, thrashing Club Brugge 7–1 in the final. PSG won their first title in 1980. Dominique Bathenay's last-minute equalizer from the penalty spot in a thrilling 4–4 draw against Standard Liège took the match to a penalty shootout, where PSG secured their first Tournoi de Paris. The capital club retained the trophy in 1981, but failed to make it three consecutive wins in 1982. Atlético Mineiro beat PSG 3–0 in the semi-finals, their heaviest defeat in the tournament to date.

PSG regained the title in 1984 and 1986, before a disastrous 1987 edition that saw the club finish bottom for the first time since 1976. The defeat to Dinamo Zagreb would be the last the Parisians would concede inside 90 minutes. Since then, they have only been beaten on penalties. PSG won again in 1989 and were unable to defend their title in 1990, as the tournament was cancelled due to the poor condition of the pitch. The Rolling Stones concert at the Parc des Princes a few weeks earlier was to blame. The tournament returned in 1991 and saw PSG finish third after defeating Sporting CP. In 1993, François Calderaro's solitary goal against AJ Auxerre gave PSG their second consecutive title, following 1992, and their seventh overall. This would prove to be the last edition until 2010 and PSG's last title to date. The club abandoned it for financial reasons.

=== Last two editions ===
PSG revived the Tournoi de Paris in 2010 to commemorate their 40th anniversary. Ahead of the tournament, PSG unveiled "Allez Paris Saint-Germain", to the tune of "Go West" by the Village People, and a lynx named Germain as the club's official anthem and mascot, respectively. The club invited Porto, Roma and Girondins de Bordeaux. Inspired by Arsenal's Emirates Cup, the competition adopted a group stage format for the 2010 edition. PSG beat Porto and shared the points with Roma, while Bordeaux drew with Roma and defeated Porto. Both French clubs finished on four points, but Bordeaux scored more goals and won the Tournoi de Paris on goal difference.

The tournament, which was not held in 2011, was renamed the Trophée de Paris in 2012. It featured a single match against Barcelona. The Spanish team won the trophy after winning on penalties following a 2–2 draw at the Parc des Princes. Rafinha and Lionel Messi, from the penalty spot, put Barcelona ahead, before goals from PSG's Zlatan Ibrahimović and Zoumana Camara forced a shootout. This was the last edition of the tournament to date.

== Statistics ==
=== Finals ===
The tournament was held 31 times between 1957 and 2012.

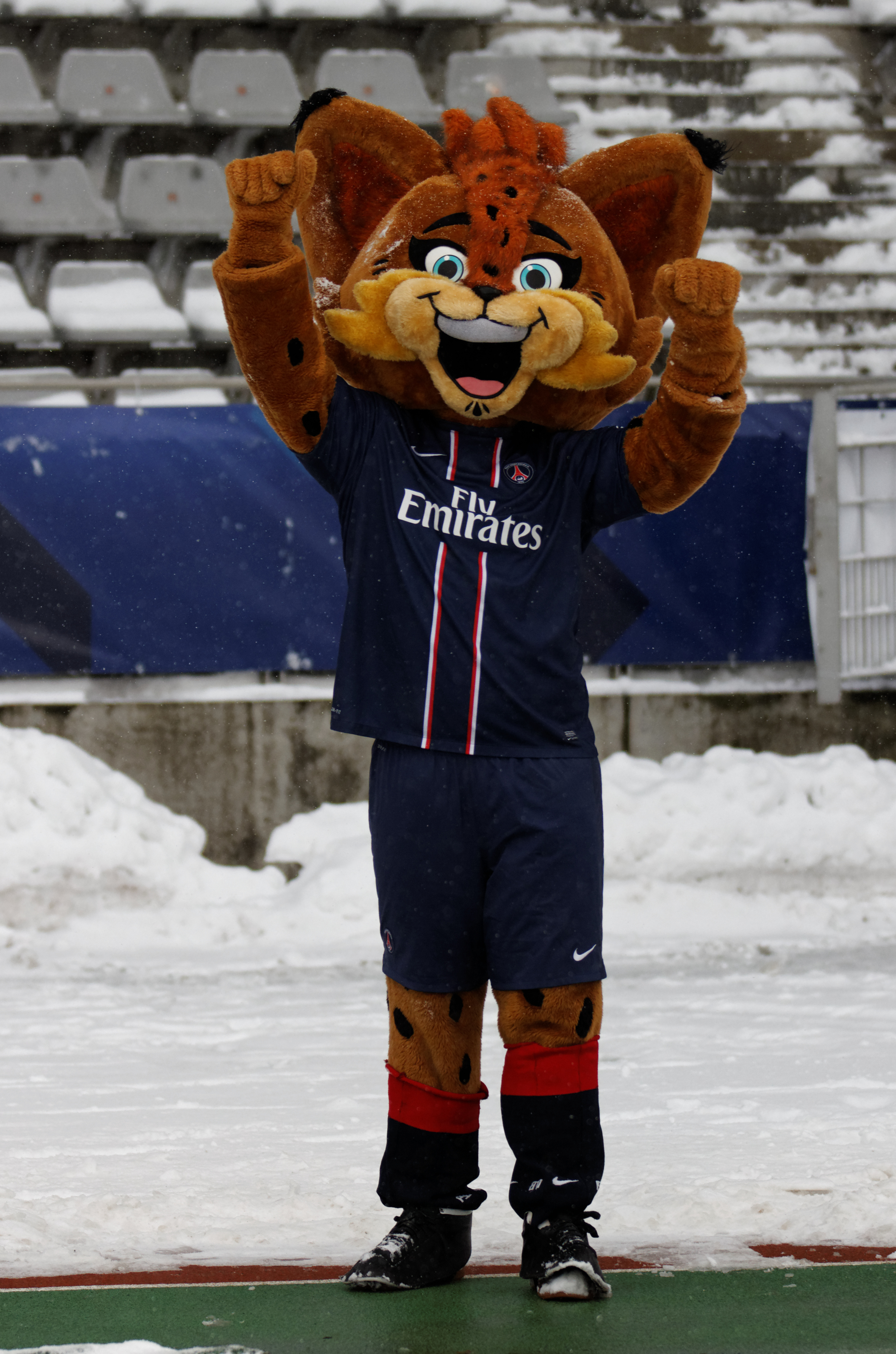
PSG's mascot, Germain the Lynx, was unveiled at the 2010 edition.

Edition	Winner	Runner-up	Third	Fourth
1957	(Brazil) Vasco da Gama	(Spain) Real Madrid	(France) Racing CF	(Germany) Rot-Weiss Essen
1958	(France) Racing CF	(England) Bolton Wanderers	(Brazil) Flamengo	(Hungary) Újpest
1959	(France) Racing CF	(Germany) Fortuna Düsseldorf	(Brazil) Vasco da Gama	(Italy) AC Milan
1960	(Brazil) Santos	(France) Racing CF	(Bulgaria) CSKA Sofia	(France) Stade de Reims
1961	(Brazil) Santos	(Portugal) Benfica	(Belgium) Anderlecht	(France) Racing CF
1962	(Serbia) Red Star Belgrade	(Austria) Rapid Wien	(France) Racing CF	(Brazil) Santos
1963	(Brazil) Botafogo	(France) Racing CF	(Belgium) Anderlecht	(Hungary) Újpest
1964	(Belgium) Anderlecht	(Germany) Borussia Dortmund	(France) Stade de Reims (Brazil) Santos	—N/a
1965	(Czech Republic) Sparta Prague	(France) Rennes	(Belgium) Anderlecht	(France) Racing CF
1966	(Belgium) Anderlecht	(France) Racing CF	(Czech Republic) Sparta Prague	(Brazil) Vasco da Gama
1973	(Netherlands) Feyenoord	(Germany) Bayern Munich	(France) Paris FC	(France) Olympique de Marseille
1975	(Spain) Valencia	(France) Paris Saint-Germain	(Brazil) Fluminense	(Portugal) Sporting CP
1976	(Brazil) Fluminense	(European Union) Europe	Brazil Olympic	(France) Paris Saint-Germain
1977	(Belgium) Anderlecht	(Hungary) Ferencváros	(France) Paris Saint-Germain	(Brazil) Vasco da Gama
1978	Netherlands	(Belgium) Club Brugge	(France) Paris Saint-Germain	Iran
1979	(Portugal) Benfica	(Serbia) Red Star Belgrade	(France) Paris Saint-Germain	Brazil Olympic
1980	(France) Paris Saint-Germain	(Belgium) Standard Liège	(Portugal) Benfica	(Netherlands) Ajax
1981	(France) Paris Saint-Germain	(Germany) Eintracht Frankfurt	(Brazil) Vasco da Gama	(France) Saint-Étienne
1982	(Brazil) Atlético Mineiro	(Croatia) Dinamo Zagreb	(France) Paris Saint-Germain	(Germany) 1. FC Köln
1983	Romania	(France) Paris Saint-Germain	(Brazil) Botafogo	(Israel) Maccabi Netanya
1984	(France) Paris Saint-Germain	(Croatia) Hajduk Split	(Switzerland) Servette	(Brazil) Botafogo
1985	(Belgium) Waregem	(France) Paris Saint-Germain	(Germany) 1. FC Köln	(France) Saint-Étienne
1986	(France) Paris Saint-Germain	(Portugal) Sporting CP	(France) Saint-Étienne	(Romania) Steaua București
1987	(Brazil) Fluminense	(France) Girondins de Bordeaux	(Croatia) Dinamo Zagreb	(France) Paris Saint-Germain
1988	(France) Montpellier	(France) Paris Saint-Germain	(Serbia) Partizan	(Switzerland) Servette
1989	(France) Paris Saint-Germain	(France) Montpellier	(Brazil) Vasco da Gama	(Portugal) Porto
1991	(France) Olympique de Marseille	(Brazil) Flamengo	(France) Paris Saint-Germain	(Portugal) Sporting CP
1992	(France) Paris Saint-Germain	(France) Monaco	(Germany) Borussia Dortmund	(England) Liverpool
1993	(France) Paris Saint-Germain	(France) Auxerre	(Germany) Eintracht Frankfurt	(Brazil) Fluminense
2010	(France) Girondins de Bordeaux	(France) Paris Saint-Germain	(Italy) Roma	(Portugal) Porto
2012	(Spain) Barcelona	(France) Paris Saint-Germain	—N/a	—N/a

=== Titles by club ===
The tournament had 20 different champions.

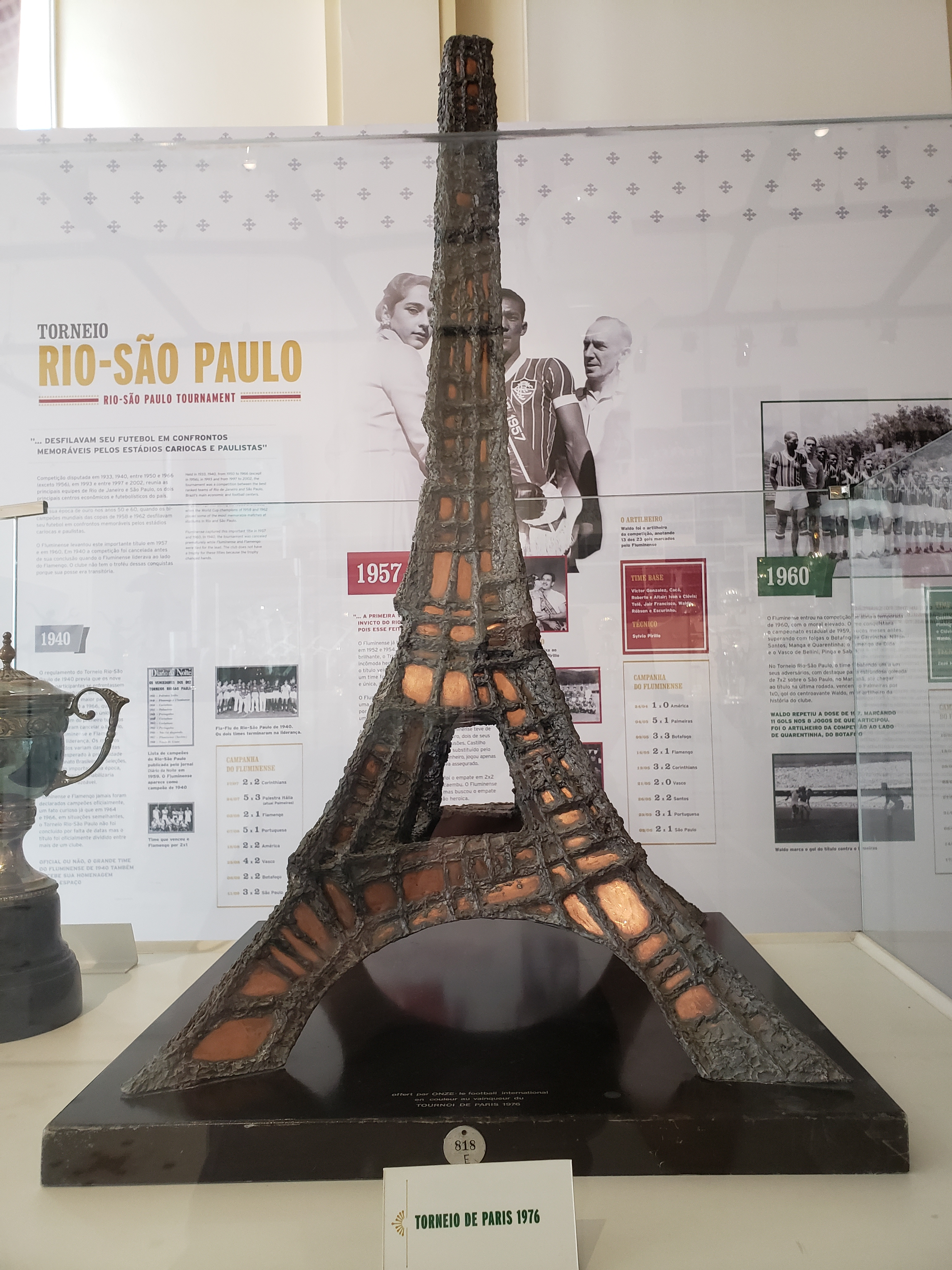
The trophy from the 1976 edition, won by Brazilian club Fluminense.

Team	Titles	Years won
(France) Paris Saint-Germain	7	1980, 1981, 1984, 1986, 1989, 1992, 1993
(Belgium) Anderlecht	3	1964, 1966, 1977
(France) Racing CF	2	1958, 1959
(Brazil) Santos	2	1960, 1961
(Brazil) Fluminense	2	1976, 1987
(Brazil) Vasco da Gama	1	1957
(Serbia) Red Star Belgrade	1	1962
(Brazil) Botafogo	1	1963
(Czech Republic) Sparta Prague	1	1965
(Netherlands) Feyenoord	1	1973
(Spain) Valencia	1	1975
Netherlands	1	1978
(Portugal) Benfica	1	1979
(Brazil) Atlético Mineiro	1	1982
Romania	1	1983
(Belgium) Waregem	1	1985
(France) Montpellier	1	1988
(France) Olympique de Marseille	1	1991
(France) Girondins de Bordeaux	1	2010
(Spain) Barcelona	1	2012
