= 1956 Campeonato Carioca =

Campeonato Carioca
- Season: 1956
- Champions: Vasco da Gama
- Matches played: 132
- Goals scored: 455 (3.45 per match)
- Top goalscorer: Valdo (Fluminense) – 22 goals
- Biggest home win: Flamengo 12-2 São Cristóvão (October 27, 1956)
- Biggest away win: Olaria 0-6 Bangu (October 28, 1956); Portuguesa 0-6 Flamengo (November 11, 1956)
- Highest scoring: Flamengo 12-2 São Cristóvão (October 27, 1956)

The 1956 edition of the Campeonato Carioca kicked off on July 21, 1956 and ended on December 23, 1956. It was organized by FMF (Federação Metropolitana de Futebol, or Metropolitan Football Federation). Twelve teams participated. Vasco da Gama won the title for the 11th time. no teams were relegated.

== System ==
The tournament would be disputed in a double round-robin format, with the team with the most points winning the title.

== Championship ==
Pos	Team	Pld	W	D	L	GF	GA	GD	Pts	Qualification or relegation
1	Vasco da Gama	22	16	4	2	58	17	+41	36	Champions
2	Fluminense	22	15	3	4	53	16	+37	33	
3	Botafogo	22	14	3	5	45	18	+27	31	
4	Flamengo	22	14	3	5	60	25	+35	31	
5	América	22	13	4	5	38	17	+21	30	
6	Bangu	22	12	2	8	54	33	+21	26	
7	Olaria	22	7	4	11	31	44	−13	18	
8	Bonsucesso	22	5	4	13	28	53	−25	14	
9	Madureira	22	6	1	15	25	57	−32	13	
10	Canto do Rio	22	5	3	14	25	56	−31	13	
11	São Cristóvão	22	1	8	13	22	64	−42	10	
12	Portuguesa	22	4	1	17	16	55	−39	9	

Updated to match(es) played on December 23, 1956. Source: RSSSF.com
Rules for classification: 1) points; 2) goal difference; 3) wins; 4) number of goals scored.

== Top Scores ==
Rank	Player	Club	Goals
1	Waldo	Fluminense	22
2	Índio	Flamengo	17
3	Didi	Botafogo	16
4	Hílton	Bangu	15
4	Quarentinha	Bonsucesso	15
6	Walter	Vasco da Gama	14
7	Vavá	Vasco da Gama	13
8	Paulo Valentim	Botafogo	12
8	Evaristo	Flamengo	12
