= 2025 CR Vasco da Gama season =

Vasco da Gama
2025 season
- Chairman: Pedrinho
- Manager: Fábio Carille (until 27 April); Felipe Loureiro (interim; 28 April–9 May); Fernando Diniz (from 9 May)
- Stadium: São Januário
- Série A: 14th
- Campeonato Carioca: Semi-finals
- Copa do Brasil: Runners-up
- Copa Sudamericana: Knockout round play-offs
- Top goalscorer: League: Pablo Vegetti; Rayan (14 each); All: Pablo Vegetti (27)
- Average home league attendance: 22,265
Home colours	Away colours	Third colours
- All statistics correct as of 12 June 2025.

The 2025 season was the 128th in the history of Club de Regatas Vasco da Gama. The club competed in its third consecutive season in the Campeonato Brasileiro Série A. The club also competed in the Campeonato Carioca, Copa do Brasil, and Copa Sudamericana.

Pablo Vegetti was the club's top scorer that season and in all of Brazilian football, with 27 goals. Rayan received the Série A Best Newcomer award and Paulo Henrique was awarded in Série A Team of the Year.

== Squad information ==
Players and squad numbers last updated on 26 October 2025. Appearances include all competitions.

=== First team ===
As of 10 September 2025

No.	Player	Nat.	Positions	Date of birth (age)	Place of birth	Signed in	Contract ends	Signed from	Apps.	Goals
Goalkeepers
1	Léo Jardim (third-captain)	(Brazil)	GK	20 April 1995 (age 31)	(Brazil) Ribeirão Preto	2023	2030	(France) Lille	168	0
13	Daniel Fuzato	(Brazil)	GK	4 July 1997 (age 29)	(Brazil) Santa Bárbara d'Oeste	2025	2026	(Spain) Eibar	4	0
36	Allan Vitor	(Brazil)	GK	8 January 2004 (age 22)	(Brazil) Rio de Janeiro	2019	2026	Academy	0	0
37	Pablo	(Brazil)	GK	11 February 2003 (age 23)	(Brazil) Volta Redonda	2019	2026	Academy	1	0
40	Phillipe Gabriel (U20)	(Brazil)	GK	23 February 2006 (age 20)	(Brazil) São Gonçalo	2019	2027	Academy	0	0
55	Alexander	(Brazil)	GK	31 May 1999 (age 27)	(Brazil) São Gonçalo	2013	2025	Academy	4	0
Defenders
2	José Luis Rodríguez	(Uruguay)	RB	14 March 1997 (age 29)	(Uruguay) Canelones	2023	2025	(Uruguay) Nacional	115	8
4	Mauricio Lemos	(Uruguay)	CB	28 December 1995 (age 30)	(Uruguay) Rivera	2025	2025	(Brazil) Atlético Mineiro	9	0
6	Lucas Piton	(Brazil)	LB	9 October 2000 (age 26)	(Brazil) Jundiaí	2023	2028	(Brazil) Corinthians	156	8
12	Victor Luis	(Brazil)	LB	26 June 1993 (age 33)	(Brazil) São Paulo	2024	2026	(Brazil) Coritiba	27	1
22	Paulo Ricardo (U20)	(Brazil)	RB	23 May 2005 (age 21)	(Brazil) Tefé	2019	2028	Academy	6	1
29	Lucas Oliveira	(Brazil)	CB	2 February 1996 (age 30)	(Brazil) Rio de Janeiro	2025	2026	(Brazil) Cruzeiro	14	0
30	Robert Renan	(Brazil)	CB	11 October 2003 (age 23)	(Brazil) Brasília	2025	2026	(Russia) Zenit	16	0
43	Lucas Freitas	(Brazil)	CB	20 January 2001 (age 25)	(Brazil) Rio de Janeiro	2025	2027	(Brazil) Palmeiras	33	1
45	Riquelme	(Brazil)	LB	28 August 2002 (age 24)	(Brazil) Barra Mansa	2017	2026	Academy	38	0
46	Carlos Cuesta	(Colombia)	CB	9 March 1999 (age 27)	(Colombia) Quibdó	2025	2026	(Turkey) Galatasaray	13	1
66	Leandrinho (U20)	(Brazil)	LB	17 March 2005 (age 21)	(Brazil) Rio de Janeiro	2021	2026	Academy	25	2
96	Paulo Henrique	(Brazil)	RB	25 July 1996 (age 30)	(Brazil) Sete Barras	2023	2028	(Brazil) Atlético Mineiro	121	6
	Avellar (U20)	(Brazil)	LB	8 March 2006 (age 20)	(Brazil) Rio de Janeiro	2021	2028	Academy	1	0
	Walace (U20)	(Brazil)	CB	7 March 2005 (age 21)	(Brazil) Rio de Janeiro	2024	2027	Academy	1	1
Midfielders
3	Tchê Tchê	(Brazil)	CM	30 August 1992 (age 34)	(Brazil) São Paulo	2025	2026	(Brazil) Botafogo	48	2
8	Jair	(Brazil)	CM / DM	26 August 1994 (age 32)	(Brazil) Ibirubá	2023	2025	(Brazil) Atlético Mineiro	76	6
9	Matheus França	(Brazil)	AM / RM / LM	1 April 2004 (age 22)	(Brazil) Rio de Janeiro	2025	2026	(England) Crystal Palace	15	0
10	Philippe Coutinho (vice-captain)	(Brazil)	AM	12 June 1992 (age 34)	(Brazil) Rio de Janeiro	2024	2026	(England) Aston Villa	113	19
14	Estrella (U20)	(Brazil)	AM	6 January 2005 (age 21)	(Brazil) Rio de Janeiro	2021	2026	Academy	7	1
15	Benjamín Garré	(Argentina)	AM / RM	11 July 2000 (age 26)	(Argentina) Buenos Aires	2025	2027	(Russia) Krylia Sovetov	21	0
17	Nuno Moreira	(Portugal)	LM / AM	16 September 1999 (age 27)	(Portugal) Espinho	2025	2027	(Portugal) Casa Pia	52	10
18	Paulinho	(Brazil)	CM / RM	8 January 1997 (age 29)	(Brazil) Rio de Janeiro	2023	2025	(Saudi Arabia) Al-Shabab	51	2
21	Jean Meneses	(Chile)	LM	16 March 1993 (age 33)	(Chile) Quillota	2024	2026	(Portugal) Toluca	15	0
23	Thiago Mendes	(Brazil)	CM	15 March 1992 (age 34)	(Brazil) São Luís	2025	2027	(Qatar) Al-Rayyan	11	0
25	Hugo Moura	(Brazil)	DM	3 January 1998 (age 28)	(Brazil) Rio Claro	2024	2026	(Brazil) Athletico Paranaense	95	3
28	Adson	(Brazil)	RM / LM	6 October 2000 (age 26)	(Brazil) Aruanã	2024	2028	(France) Nantes	50	4
70	Euder (U20)	(Brazil)	CM	18 March 2005 (age 21)	(Brazil) Recife	2024	2027	Academy	0	0
85	Mateus Carvalho	(Brazil)	DM / CM	18 March 2002 (age 24)	(Brazil) Tucuruí	2023	2027	(Brazil) Athletico Paranaense	97	2
88	Cauan Barros	(Brazil)	CM	6 May 2004 (age 22)	(Brazil) Tacaratu	2019	2027	Academy	37	3
	Lukas Zuccarello (U20)	(Brazil)	AM / RM / LM	2 December 2006 (age 19)	(Brazil) São Paulo	2022	2028	Academy	9	0
	Ray Breno	(Brazil)	AM	31 August 2005 (age 21)	(Brazil) Natal	2019	2028	Academy	0	0
Forwards
7	David	(Brazil)	LW / ST	17 January 1995 (age 31)	(Brazil) Vitória	2024	2028	(Brazil) Internacional	69	9
11	Andrés Gómez	(Colombia)	RW / LW	12 September 2002 (age 24)	(Colombia) Quibdó	2025	2026	(France) Rennes	17	1
19	GB (U20)	(Brazil)	ST	5 January 2005 (age 21)	(Brazil) Rio de Janeiro	2019	2028	Academy	20	3
27	Léo Jacó (U20)	(Brazil)	ST	4 June 2005 (age 21)	(Brazil) Rio de Janeiro	2023	2026	Academy	2	0
72	Bruno Lopes (U20)	(Brazil)	ST / RW	25 July 2007 (age 19)	(Brazil) Tupã	2023	2027	Academy	6	0
77	Rayan (U20)	(Brazil)	ST / RW / LW	3 August 2006 (age 20)	(Brazil) Rio de Janeiro	2018	2026	Academy	94	22
99	Pablo Vegetti (captain)	(Argentina)	ST	15 October 1988 (age 38)	(Argentina) Santa Fe	2023	2026	(Argentina) Belgrano	135	59
	Paixão	(Brazil)	ST / LW	27 May 2004 (age 22)	(Brazil) Rio de Janeiro	2019	2025	Academy	4	1
	Andrey Fernandes (U20)	(Brazil)	LW / ST	5 February 2008 (age 18)	(Brazil) Recife	2023	2027	Academy	3	0

=== Out on loan ===
Player	Nat.	Positions	Date of birth (age)	Place of birth	Signed in	Contract ends	Signed from	Apps.	Goals
Defenders
Lyncon	(Brazil)	CB	7 May 2005 (age 21)	(Brazil) Itaboraí	2019	2026	Academy	4	1
Maicon	(Brazil)	CB	14 September 1988 (age 38)	(Brazil) Barretos	2023	2025	(Brazil) Santos	55	1
Midfielders
Juan Sforza	(Argentina)	DM	14 February 2002 (age 24)	(Argentina) Rosario	2024	2028	(Brazil) Newell's Old Boys	44	1
Maxime Dominguez	(Switzerland)	CM / AM / RM	1 February 1996 (age 30)	(Switzerland) Geneva	2024	2026	(Portugal) Gil Vicente	14	1
JP	(Brazil)	CM / AM	19 April 2005 (age 21)	(Brazil) Goiânia	2020	2027	Academy	13	0
Lucas Eduardo	(Brazil)	DM	13 January 2004 (age 22)	(Brazil) Rio de Janeiro	2019	2027	Academy	4	0
Forwards
Loide Augusto	(Angola)	LW / RW	26 February 2000 (age 26)	(Angola) Luanda	2025	2027	(Turkey) Alanyaspor	18	0

=== Transfers in ===
Pos.	Player	Transferred from	Fee	Date	Source
DF	(Argentina) Manuel Capasso	(Paraguay) Olimpia	Loan return	31 December 2024	
FW	(Brazil) Figueiredo	(Brazil) Coritiba	Loan return	31 December 2024	
MF	(Paraguay) Matías Galarza	(Argentina) Talleres	Loan return	31 December 2024	
MF	(Brazil) Hugo Moura	(Brazil) Athletico Paranaense	€2,000,000	1 January 2025	
FW	(Brazil) David	(Brazil) Internacional	Undisclosed	1 January 2025	
MF	(Brazil) Tchê Tchê	(Brazil) Botafogo	Free	6 January 2025	
GK	(Brazil) Daniel Fuzato	(Spain) Eibar	Free	7 January 2025	
DF	(Brazil) Lucas Oliveira	(Brazil) Cruzeiro	Undisclosed	8 January 2025	
DF	(Brazil) Lucas Freitas	(Brazil) Palmeiras	Undisclosed	14 January 2025	
DF	(Uruguay) Mauricio Lemos	(Brazil) Atlético Mineiro	Free	15 January 2025	
MF	(Argentina) Benjamín Garré	(Russia) Krylia Sovetov	€2,500,000	22 February 2025	
MF	(Portugal) Nuno Moreira	(Portugal) Casa Pia	€3,500,000	25 February 2025	
FW	(Angola) Loide Augusto	(Turkey) Alanyaspor	€1,500,000	27 February 2025	
MF	(Brazil) Lucas Eduardo	(Brazil) Cuiabá	Loan return	16 June 2025	
MF	(Brazil) Philippe Coutinho	(England) Aston Villa	Undisclosed	4 July 2025	
MF	(Brazil) Thiago Mendes	(Qatar) Al-Rayyan	Free	14 July 2025	
MF	(Brazil) Cauan Barros	(Brazil) América Mineiro	Loan return	8 August 2025	
FW	(Colombia) Andrés Gómez	(France) Rennes	Loan	19 August 2025	
DF	(Brazil) Robert Renan	(Russia) Zenit	Loan	25 August 2025	
MF	(Brazil) Matheus França	(England) Crystal Palace	Loan	26 August 2025	
DF	(Colombia) Carlos Cuesta	(Turkey) Galatasaray	Loan	1 September 2025	

=== Transfers out ===
Pos.	Player	Transferred to	Fee	Date	Source
DF	(Brazil) Victão	(Brazil) Pouso Alegre	Free	16 December 2024	
MF	(Brazil) Ray Breno	(Brazil) Pouso Alegre	Loan	17 December 2024	
GK	(Brazil) Alexander	(Brazil) Bangu	Loan	28 December 2024	
FW	(Brazil) Figueiredo	(Brazil) América Mineiro	Loan	30 December 2024	
MF	(Brazil) Cauan Barros	(Brazil) América Mineiro	Loan	30 December 2024	
FW	(Brazil) Rossi	(Brazil) Paysandu	Free	31 December 2024	
MF	(Chile) Pablo Galdames	(Argentina) Independiente	Free	31 December 2024	
MF	(Paraguay) Matías Galarza	(Argentina) Talleres	€1,400,000	1 January 2025	
DF	(Brazil) Léo	(Brazil) Athletico Paranaense	€2,000,000	2 January 2025	
DF	(Brazil) Maicon	(Brazil) Coritiba	Loan	9 January 2025	
DF	(Brazil) Roger Fellipo	(Brazil) Água Santa	Loan	16 January 2025	
FW	(Colombia) Emerson Rodríguez	(United States) Inter Miami	Contract Terminated	22 January 2025	
MF	(Brazil) Serginho	(Turkey) Fatih Karagümrük	Contract Terminated	28 January 2025	
DF	(Brazil) Leandrinho	(Saudi Arabia) Al-Shabab	Loan	28 January 2025	
FW	(Argentina) Luca Orellano	(United States) FC Cincinnati	US$3,000,000	22 February 2025	
MF	(Brazil) Zé Gabriel	(Brazil) Criciúma	Contract Terminated	24 February 2025	
MF	(Brazil) Lucas Eduardo	(Brazil) Cuiabá	Loan	19 March 2025	
MF	(Brazil) JP	(Brazil) Avaí	Loan	27 March 2025	
MF	(Switzerland) Maxime Dominguez	(Canada) Toronto FC	Loan	3 April 2025	
MF	(Brazil) Patrick de Lucca	(Brazil) Cuiabá	Contract Terminated	11 April 2025	
DF	(Brazil) Roger Fellipo	(Brazil) Figueirense	Free	11 April 2025	
GK	(Brazil) Alexander	(Brazil) Capital	Loan	24 April 2025	
MF	(Brazil) Souza		Contract Terminated	16 May 2025	
DF	(Argentina) Manuel Capasso	(Paraguay) Club Olimpia	Contract Terminated	16 May 2025	
MF	(Brazil) Ray Breno	(Brazil) Nova Iguaçu	Loan	29 May 2025	
FW	(Brazil) Maxsuell	(Brazil) Nova Iguaçu	Contract Terminated	30 May 2025	
MF	(France) Dimitri Payet		Contract Terminated	9 June 2025	
FW	(Brazil) Erick Marcus	(Bulgaria) Ludogorets	€1,000,000	25 June 2025	
DF	(Brazil) Lyncon	(Brazil) Volta Redonda	Loan	5 August 2025	
DF	(Brazil) João Victor	(Russia) CSKA Moscow	€5,000,000	19 August 2025	
DF	(Brazil) Luiz Gustavo	(Brazil) Bahia	€5,000,000	25 August 2025	
MF	(Argentina) Juan Sforza	(Brazil) Juventude	Loan	27 August 2025	
FW	(Brazil) Figueiredo	(Portugal) Alverca	€750,000	30 August 2025	
MF	(Brazil) Lucas Eduardo	(Brazil) Avaí	Loan	3 September 2025	
FW	(Angola) Loide Augusto	(Turkey) Çaykur Rizespor	Loan	10 September 2025	
FW	(Brazil) Alex Teixeira		Contract Terminated	10 September 2025	

== Friendlies ==
5 July 2025	Vasco da Gama (Brazil)	Cancelled	(Uruguay) Montevideo Wanderers	Natal, Brazil
17:00 UTC−3				Stadium: Arena das Dunas

== Competitions ==
=== Overall record ===
Competition	First match	Last match	Starting round	Final position	Record							
Competition	First match	Last match	Starting round	Final position	Pld	W	D	L	GF	GA	GD	Win %
Série A	29 March 2025	21 December 2025	Matchday 1	14th	38	13	6	19	55	60	−5	34.21
Campeonato Carioca	11 January 2025	8 March 2025	Taça Guanabara	Semi-finals	13	4	5	4	14	12	+2	30.77
Copa do Brasil	18 February 2025	21 December 2025	First round	Final	12	4	6	2	16	9	+7	33.33
Copa Sudamericana	2 April 2025	22 July 2025	Group stage	Knockout round play-offs	8	2	3	3	9	13	−4	25.00
Total					71	23	20	28	94	94	+0	32.39

Last updated: 24 December 2025
Source: Competitions

=== Série A ===
==== League table ====
Pos	Team	Pld	W	D	L	GF	GA	GD	Pts	Qualification or relegation
12	Santos	38	12	11	15	45	50	−5	47	Qualification for Copa Sudamericana group stage
13	Corinthians	38	12	11	15	42	47	−5	47	Qualification for Copa Libertadores group stage (Note: Corinthians qualified for the Copa Libertadores group stage by winning the 2025 Copa do Brasil.)
14	Vasco da Gama	38	13	6	19	55	60	−5	45	Qualification for Copa Sudamericana group stage
15	Vitória	38	11	12	15	35	52	−17	45	
16	Internacional	38	11	11	16	44	57	−13	44	

Source: CBF
Rules for classification: 1) points; 2) wins; 3) goal difference; 4) goals scored; 5) head-to-head results (only between two teams); 6) fewest red cards; 7) fewest yellow cards; 8) drawing of lots.

==== Results by round ====
Round	1	2	3	4	5	6	7	8	9	10	11	12	13	14	15	16	17	18	19	20	21	22	23	24	25	26	27	28	29	30	31	32	33	34	35	36	37	38
Ground	H	A	H	A	H	A	H	A	H	A	H	A	H	A	H	H	A	A	H	A	H	A	H	A	H	A	H	A	H	A	H	A	H	A	A	H	H	A
Result	W	L	W	L	D	L	L	L	W	L	L	W	L	L	D	W	D	L	D	W	L	W	D	D	W	L	W	W	W	W	L	L	L	L	L	W	L	L
Position	3	11	4	7	8	11	14	17	13	15	15	13	15	16	17	15	15	16	16	15	16	15	14	15	13	14	11	9	8	8	9	9	10	13	13	11	12	14
Points	3	3	6	6	7	7	7	7	10	10	10	13	13	13	14	17	18	18	19	22	22	25	26	27	30	30	33	36	39	42	42	42	42	42	42	45	45	45

A = Away; H = Home; W = Win; D = Draw; L = Loss

==== Matches ====
30 March 2025 1	Vasco da Gama	2–1	Santos	Rio de Janeiro
18:30 UTC-03:00	Nuno Moreira 53'; Vegetti 78'	Report	21' Barreal	Stadium: São Januário; Attendance: 19,550; Referee: Rafael Rodrigo Klein

5 April 2025 2	Corinthians	3–0	Vasco da Gama	São Paulo
18:30 UTC−3	Yuri Alberto 12'; Depay 27'; João Victor 90+1' (o.g.)	Report		Stadium: Neo Química Arena; Attendance: 43,250; Referee: Anderson Daronco

12 April 2025 3	Vasco da Gama	3–1	Sport	Rio de Janeiro
21:00 UTC-03:00	Vegetti 32', 41'; Rayan 83'	Report	Hugo Moura 55' (o.g.)	Stadium: São Januário; Attendance: 15,969; Referee: Wilton Sampaio

15 April 2025 4	Ceará	2–1	Vasco da Gama	Fortaleza
18:30 UTC−3	Pedro Raul 29', 81'	Report	Vegetti 90+2'	Stadium: Castelão

19 April 2025 5	Vasco da Gama	0–0	Flamengo	Rio de Janeiro
18:30 UTC−3		Report		Stadium: Maracanã; Attendance: 39,027; Referee: Raphael Claus

27 April 2025 6	Cruzeiro	1–0	Vasco da Gama	Uberlândia
18:30 UTC−3	Christian 88'	Report		Stadium: Parque do Sabiá; Attendance: 15,398; Referee: Rafael Rodrigo Klein

4 May 2025 7	Vasco da Gama	0–1	Palmeiras	Brasília
16:00 UTC−3		Report	Vitor Roque 60'	Stadium: Mané Garrincha; Attendance: 30,318; Referee: Davi de Oliveira Lacerda

10 May 2025 8	Vitória	2–1	Vasco da Gama	Salvador
18:30 UTC−3	Renato Kayzer 60', 90'	Report	Vegetti 42'	Stadium: Barradão

18 May 2025 9	Vasco da Gama	3–0	Fortaleza	Rio de Janeiro
18:30 (UTC-3)	Moreira 3'; Vegetti 46', 80'	Report		Stadium: Estádio Vasco da Gama (São Januário)

24 May 2025 10	Fluminense	2–1	Vasco da Gama	Rio de Janeiro
18:30 UTC-03:00	Vegetti 42' (o.g.); Guga 87'	Report	João Victor 25'	Stadium: Maracanã

31 May 2025 11	Vasco da Gama	0–2	Red Bull Bragantino	Rio de Janeiro
21:00 (UTC-3)		Report	Guilherme 2'; Pitta 34'	Stadium: Estádio Vasco da Gama (São Januário)

12 June 2025 12	São Paulo	1–3	Vasco da Gama	São Paulo
21:30 UTC−3	Ryan Francisco 90+3'	Report	Rayan 26'; Nuno Moreira 40'; Vegetti 69'	Stadium: Morumbi; Attendance: 20,332; Referee: Rafael Rodrigo Klein

12 July 2025 13	Vasco da Gama	0–2	Botafogo	Brasília
18:30 UTC−3		Report	Cabral 48'; Fernandes 78'	Stadium: Estádio Nacional Mané Garrincha; Referee: Anderson Daronco

19 July 2025 15	Vasco da Gama	1–1	Grêmio	Rio de Janeiro
17:30 UTC−3	Lucas Freitas 64'	Report	Gustavo Martins 80'	Stadium: Estádio São Januário; Attendance: 15,556; Referee: Felipe Fernandes de Lima

27 July 2025 17	Internacional	1–1	Vasco da Gama	Porto Alegre
18:30	Carbonero 90+1'	Report	Rayan 30'	Stadium: Beira-Rio; Attendance: 13,188; Referee: Flávio Rodrigues de Souza

2 August 2025 18	Mirassol	3–2	Vasco da Gama	Mirassol
18:30 UTC−3	Negueba 51'; Chico 58'; Alesson 83'	Report	Rodríguez 66'; Vegetti 70'	Stadium: Estádio José Maria de Campos Maia; Referee: Wilton Pereira Sampaio

10 August 2025 19	Vasco da Gama	1–1	Atlético Mineiro	Rio de Janeiro
16:00 UTC−3	Vegetti 18' (pen.), (yellow card) 90+4'; Paulo Henrique (yellow card) 42'		Menino 1'; Alexsander (yellow card) 67'	Stadium: São Januário; Attendance: 16,157; Referee: Davi De Oliveira Lacerda

17 August 2025 20	Santos	0–6	Vasco da Gama	São Paulo
16:00 UTC−3	Luisão (yellow card) 15'; Neymar (yellow card) 39'		Hugo Moura (yellow card) 1'; Piton 18'; Jair (yellow card) 38'; Tchê Tchê (yellow card) 41', (goal) 68'; David 52'; Coutinho 54', 62'; Rayan 60' (pen.), (yellow card) 61'	Stadium: Estádio do Morumbi; Referee: Ramon Abatti

20 August 2025 14	Juventude	2–0	Vasco da Gama	Caxias do Sul
19:00 UTC−3

24 August 2025 21	Vasco da Gama	2–3	Corinthians	Rio de Janeiro
16:00 UTC−3

31 August 2025 22	Sport	2–3	Vasco da Gama	Recife
20:30 UTC−3

14 September 2025 23	Vasco da Gama	2–2	Ceará	Rio de Janeiro
20:30 UTC−3

21 September 2025 24	Flamengo	1–1	Vasco da Gama	Rio de Janeiro
17:30 UTC−3

24 September 2025 16	Vasco da Gama	3–1	Bahia	Rio de Janeiro
19:30 UTC−3

27 September 2025 25	Vasco da Gama	2–0	Cruzeiro	Rio de Janeiro
18:30 UTC−3

1 October 2025 26	Palmeiras	3–0	Vasco da Gama	São Paulo
19:00 UTC−3

5 October 2025 27	Vasco da Gama	4–3	Vitória	Rio de Janeiro
16:00 UTC−3

15 October 2025 28	Fortaleza	0–2	Vasco da Gama	Fortaleza
21:30 UTC−3

20 October 2025 29	Vasco da Gama	2–0	Fluminense	Rio de Janeiro
19:30 UTC−3

26 October 2025 30	Red Bull Bragantino	0–3	Vasco da Gama	Bragança Paulista
18:30 UTC−3

2 November 2025 31	Vasco da Gama	0–2	São Paulo	Rio de Janeiro
20:30 UTC−3

5 November 2025 32	Botafogo	3–0	Vasco da Gama	Rio de Janeiro
19:30 UTC−3

8 November 2025 33	Vasco da Gama	1–3	Juventude	Rio de Janeiro
18:00 UTC−3

19 November 2025 34	Grêmio	2–0	Vasco da Gama	Porto Alegre
21:30 UTC−3

23 November 2025 35	Bahia	1–0	Vasco da Gama	Salvador
16:00 UTC−3

28 November 2025 36	Vasco da Gama	5–1	Internacional	Rio de Janeiro
19:30 UTC−3

2 December 2025 37	Vasco da Gama	0–2	Mirassol	Rio de Janeiro
19:00 UTC−3

7 December 2025 38	Atlético Mineiro	5–0	Vasco da Gama	Belo Horizonte
16:00 UTC−3

=== Campeonato Carioca ===
The draw took place on 26 November 2024.

==== Taça Guanabara table ====
Pos	Team	Pld	W	D	L	GF	GA	GD	Pts	Qualification
2	Volta Redonda	11	6	2	3	13	12	+1	20	Advance to semi-finals
3	Fluminense	11	4	5	2	13	9	+4	17	Advance to semi-finals
4	Vasco da Gama	11	4	5	2	13	9	+4	17	Advance to semi-finals
5	Sampaio Corrêa	11	4	4	3	13	11	+2	16	Advance to Taça Rio semi-finals
6	Nova Iguaçu	11	4	4	3	8	9	−1	16	Advance to Taça Rio semi-finals

Source: FERJ

==== Results by round ====
Round	1	2	3	4
Ground	A	H	A	H
Result	D	D	D	
Position				

Updated to match(es) played on 19 January 2025. Source:
A = Away; H = Home; W = Win; D = Draw; L = Loss

==== Matches ====
11 January 2025 1	Nova Iguaçu	1–1	Vasco da Gama	Vasco da Gama
16:30 UTC−3	Sidney 64'		Paulinho 43'	Stadium: São Januário; Referee: Carlos Tadeu Ferreira de Castro

16 January 2025 2	Vasco da Gama	0–0	Bangu	Vasco da Gama
21:30 UTC−3	Jair (penalty missed) 88'			Stadium: São Januário; Referee: Jodis Nascimento de Souza

19 January 2025 3	Boavista	1–1	Vasco da Gama	Saquarema
19:00 UTC−3	Zé Vitor 22'; Xandão (red card) 90'		Walace 71'	Stadium: Estádio Elcyr Resende de Mendonça; Referee: Felipe da Silva Gonçalves Paludo

23 January 2025 4	Vasco da Gama	v	Madureira	Vasco da Gama
21:30 UTC−3				Stadium: São Januário

==== Semi-finals ====
1 March 2025 First leg Clássico dos Milhões	Vasco da Gama	0–1	Flamengo	Rio de Janeiro
17:45 UTC−3		Report	Bruno Henrique 67' (Plata)	Stadium: Nilton Santos; Attendance: 10,966; Referee: Bruno Arleu de Araújo

8 March 2025 Second leg Clássico dos Milhões	Flamengo	2–1 (3–1 agg.)	Vasco da Gama	Rio de Janeiro
17:45 UTC−3	Bruno Henrique 36'; L. Araújo	Report	Moreira 22' (Freitas)	Stadium: Maracanã; Attendance: 55,096; Referee: Wagner do Nascimento Magalhães

=== Copa do Brasil ===
==== First round ====
18 February 2025	União Rondonópolis	0–3	Vasco da Gama	Cariacica
21:30		Report	Vegetti 48' (pen.); Rayan 81'; Hugo Moura 89'	Stadium: Estádio Kleber Andrade; Attendance: 5,594; Referee: Rodrigo José Pereira de Lima (Pernambuco)

==== Second round ====
5 March 2025	Nova Iguaçu	0–3	Vasco da Gama	Rio de Janeiro
21:30		Report	Rayan 9'; Coutinho 20' (pen.), 38'	Stadium: Estádio Olímpico Nilton Santos; Attendance: 9,351; Referee: Anderson Daronco (Rio Grande do Sul)

==== Third round ====
1 May 2025 First leg	Operário Ferroviário	1–1	Vasco da Gama	Ponta Grossa
16:00 UTC−3	Boschilia 71'	Report	Moreira 20'	Stadium: Estádio Germano Krüger; Referee: Anderson Daronco

20 May 2025 Second leg	Vasco da Gama	1–1 (2–2 agg.) (7–6 p)	Operário Ferroviário	Rio de Janeiro
19:00 UTC−3	Rayan 42'	Report	Ademilson 90+2'	Stadium: São Januário; Referee: Sávio Sampaio
	Penalties
	Vegetti (penalty scored); Tchê Tchê (penalty scored); Lucas Piton (penalty scored); João Victor (penalty missed); Mateus Carvalho (penalty scored); Adson (penalty scored); Hugo Moura (penalty scored); Paulo Henrique (penalty missed); Loide Augusto (penalty scored)		(penalty scored) Allano; (penalty missed) Neto Paraíba; (penalty scored) Gabriel Boschilia; (penalty scored) Rodrigo; (penalty scored) Ademilson; (penalty scored) Índio; (penalty scored) Cristiano; (penalty missed) Thales; (penalty missed) Allan

==== Round of 16 ====
30 July 2025 First leg	CSA	0–0	Vasco da Gama	Maceió
19:00		Report		Stadium: Rei Pelé; Referee: Rafael Rodrigo Klein

5 August 2025 Second leg	Vasco da Gama	3–1 (3–1 agg.)	CSA	Rio de Janeiro
21:30	Rayan 19'; Coutinho 30'; Tchê Tchê 45'	Report	Brayann 48'	Stadium: São Januário; Attendance: 19,171; Referee: Raphael Claus

==== Quarter-finals ====
27 August 2025 First leg	Vasco da Gama	1–1	Botafogo	Rio de Janeiro
21:30	Jair 17'	Report	Arthur Cabral 8'	Stadium: São Januário; Attendance: 20,358; Referee: Anderson Daronco

11 September 2025 Second leg	Botafogo	1–1 (2–2 agg.) (3–5 p)	Vasco da Gama	Rio de Janeiro
21:30	Alex Telles 42' (pen.)	Report	Nuno Moreira 20'	Stadium: Nilton Santos; Attendance: 40,649; Referee: Rodrigo José Pereira de Lima
	Penalties
	Alex Telles (penalty missed); Marlon Freitas (penalty scored); Matheus Martins (penalty scored); Savarino (penalty scored)		(penalty scored) Vegetti; (penalty scored) Rayan; (penalty scored) Rodríguez; (penalty scored) Matheus França; (penalty scored) Robert Renan

==== Semi-finals ====
11 December 2025 First leg	Vasco da Gama	2–1	Fluminense	Rio de Janeiro
20:00	Rayan 49'; Vegetti 90+4'	Report	Serna 22'	Stadium: Maracanã; Referee: Raphael Claus

14 December 2025 Second leg	Fluminense	1–0 (2–2 agg.) (3–4 p)	Vasco da Gama	Rio de Janeiro
20:30	Paulo Henrique 35' (o.g.)	Report		Stadium: Maracanã; Attendance: 67,560; Referee: Wilton Sampaio
	Penalties
	Thiago Silva (penalty scored); John Kennedy (penalty missed); Ganso (penalty scored); Renê (penalty scored); Canobbio (penalty missed)		(penalty missed) Vegetti; (penalty scored) Rayan; (penalty scored) Victor Luis; (penalty scored) Coutinho; (penalty scored) Rodríguez

==== Finals ====
17 December 2025 First leg	Corinthians	0–0	Vasco da Gama	São Paulo
21:30		Report		Stadium: Arena Corinthians; Attendance: 46,616; Referee: Rafael Rodrigo Klein

21 December 2025 Second leg	Vasco da Gama	1–2 (1–2 agg.)	Corinthians	Rio de Janeiro
18:00	Moreira 41'	Report	Alberto 18'; Depay 63'	Stadium: Maracanã; Referee: Wilton Sampaio

=== Copa Sudamericana ===
==== Group stage ====
Pos	Team	Pld	W	D	L	GF	GA	GD	Pts	Qualification
1	(Argentina) Lanús	6	3	3	0	9	4	+5	12	Advance to round of 16
2	(Brazil) Vasco da Gama	6	2	2	2	8	8	0	8	Advance to knockout round play-offs
3	(Peru) Melgar	6	2	1	3	5	10	−5	7	
4	(Venezuela) Academia Puerto Cabello	6	1	2	3	8	8	0	5	

Source: CONMEBOL

2 April 2025 1	Melgar (Peru)	3–3	(Brazil) Vasco da Gama	Arequipa, Peru
17:00 UTC−5	Rodríguez 39'; Castro 80'; Cabrera 90'	Report	Coutinho 3'; Vegetti 32', 51'	Stadium: Estadio Monumental de la UNSA; Attendance: 10,529; Referee: Derlis López (Paraguay)

8 April 2025 2	Vasco da Gama (Brazil)	1–0	(Venezuela) Academia Puerto Cabello	Rio de Janeiro, Brazil
21:30 UTC−3	Vegetti 45+2'	Report		Stadium: Estádio São Januário; Attendance: 17,950; Referee: Bryan Loayza (Ecuador)

22 April 2025 3	Vasco da Gama (Brazil)	0–0	(Argentina) Lanús	Rio de Janeiro, Brazil
21:30 UTC−3		Report		Stadium: Estádio São Januário; Attendance: 19,291; Referee: Gery Vargas (Bolivia)

7 May 2025 4	Academia Puerto Cabello (Venezuela)	4–1	(Brazil) Vasco da Gama	Valencia, Venezuela
18:00 UTC−4	Paredes 28' (pen.), 65'; Padrón 49'; Guerrero 60'	Report	João Victor 38'	Stadium: Estadio Misael Delgado (Note: Academia Puerto Cabello play their home matches at Estadio Misael Delgado, Valencia instead of their regular stadium Estadio La Bombonerita, Puerto Cabello which did not meet CONMEBOL requirements.); Attendance: 2,650; Referee: José Méndez (Paraguay)

13 May 2025 5	Lanús (Argentina)	1–0	(Brazil) Vasco da Gama	Lanús, Argentina
21:30 UTC−3	Carrera 53'	Report		Stadium: Estadio Ciudad de Lanús; Attendance: 6,555; Referee: Carlos Benítez (Paraguay)

27 May 2025 6	Vasco da Gama (Brazil)	3–0	(Peru) Melgar	Rio de Janeiro, Brazil
19:00 UTC−3	Rayan 3'; Paulo Henrique 33'; Vegetti 44'	Report		Stadium: Estádio São Januário; Referee: Jhon Ospina (Colombia)

==== Knockout round play-offs ====
15 July 2025 First leg	Independiente del Valle (Ecuador)	4–0	(Brazil) Vasco da Gama	Quito, Ecuador
19:30 UTC−5	Carabajal 45+3'; Mercado 49', 82'; Spinelli 51'	Report		Stadium: Estadio Olímpico Atahualpa (Note: Independiente del Valle played their knockout round play-off home match at Estadio Olímpico Atahualpa, Quito instead of their regular stadium Estadio Banco Guayaquil, Quito which did not meet CONMEBOL requirements for this round.); Referee: Kevin Ortega (Peru)

22 July 2025 Second leg	Vasco da Gama (Brazil)	1–1 (1–5 agg.)	(Ecuador) Independiente del Valle	Rio de Janeiro, Brazil
21:30 UTC−3	Vegetti 66'	Report	Spinelli 37'	Stadium: Estádio São Januário; Referee: Andrés Rojas (Colombia)

== Statistics ==
=== Appearances and goals ===
As of match played 2 December 2025

No.	Pos	Nat	Player	Total		Campeonato Brasileiro Série A		Copa do Brasil		Copa Sudamericana		Campeonato Carioca	
No.	Pos	Nat	Player	Apps	Goals	Apps	Goals	Apps	Goals	Apps	Goals	Apps	Goals
1	GK	(Brazil) BRA	Léo Jardim	62	0	36	0	8	0	8	0	10	0
2	DF	(Uruguay) URU	Puma	39	2	15+9	2	0+5	0	0+2	0	2+6	0
3	MF	(Brazil) BRA	Tchê Tchê	47	2	23+4	1	4+1	1	6+1	0	7+1	0
4	DF	(Uruguay) URU	Lemos	9	0	3+1	0	1	0	2+1	0	0+1	0
6	DF	(Brazil) BRA	Lucas Piton	56	1	30+1	1	8	0	7	0	9+1	0
7	FW	(Brazil) BRA	David	29	2	4+19	2	1+3	0	1+1	0	0	0
8	MF	(Brazil) BRA	Jair	27	1	7+4	0	3+1	1	3+1	0	6+2	0
9	MF	(Brazil) BRA	M. França	15	0	1+13	0	0+1	0	0	0	0	0
10	MF	(Brazil) BRA	Coutinho	52	11	30	5	7+1	3	6	1	8	2
11	FW	(Colombia) COL	A. Gómez	17	1	10+6	1	0+1	0	0	0	0	0
12	DF	(Brazil) BRA	Victor Luis	14	0	1+5	0	0+1	0	1+1	0	4+1	0
13	GK	(Brazil) BRA	Fuzato	4	0	1+1	0	0	0	0	0	2	0
14	MF	(Brazil) BRA	Estrella	2	0	0	0	0+1	0	0+1	0	0	0
15	MF	(Argentina) ARG	Garré	21	0	4+6	0	0+3	0	2+4	0	0+2	0
17	MF	(Portugal) POR	N. Moreira	53	10	35+1	7	8	2	7+1	0	1	1
18	MF	(Brazil) BRA	Paulinho	26	1	3+7	0	1	0	1+6	0	5+3	1
19	FW	(Brazil) BRA	GB	14	2	0+11	2	0	0	1	0	2	0
21	MF	(Chile) CHI	Jean David	7	0	0+1	0	0+1	0	0	0	2+3	0
22	DF	(Brazil) BRA	Paulo Ricardo	2	1	0	0	0	0	0	0	2	1
23	MF	(Brazil) BRA	T. Mendes	11	0	3+5	0	0+3	0	0	0	0	0
25	MF	(Brazil) BRA	Hugo Moura	58	1	27+5	0	8	1	7	0	8+3	0
27	FW	(Brazil) BRA	Léo Jacó	2	0	0+2	0	0	0	0	0	0	0
28	MF	(Brazil) BRA	Adson	16	0	0+10	0	0+1	0	0+5	0	0	0
29	DF	(Brazil) BRA	L. Oliveira	14	0	1+6	0	0	0	0+2	0	5	0
30	DF	(Brazil) BRA	Robert R.	16	0	15	0	0+1	0	0	0	0	0
36	GK	(Brazil) BRA	Allan	0	0	0	0	0	0	0	0	0	0
37	GK	(Brazil) BRA	Pablo	1	0	0	0	0	0	0	0	1	0
40	GK	(Brazil) BRA	P. Gabriel	0	0	0	0	0	0	0	0	0	0
43	DF	(Brazil) BRA	Lucas Freitas	36	1	18+2	1	6+1	0	3	0	5+1	0
45	DF	(Brazil) BRA	Riquelme	2	0	0	0	0	0	0	0	0+2	0
46	DF	(Colombia) COL	Cuesta	13	1	12+1	1	0	0	0	0	0	0
66	DF	(Brazil) BRA	Leandrinho	2	0	0+1	0	0	0	0+1	0	0	0
70	MF	(Brazil) BRA	Euder	0	0	0	0	0	0	0	0	0	0
72	FW	(Brazil) BRA	Bruno Lopes	5	0	0	0	0	0	0	0	3+2	0
77	FW	(Brazil) BRA	Rayan	53	19	33+1	14	7+1	4	6+2	1	2+1	0
85	MF	(Brazil) BRA	Mateus C.	38	0	4+14	0	1+5	0	1+3	0	4+6	0
88	MF	(Brazil) BRA	Barros	19	1	16+1	1	2	0	0	0	0	0
96	DF	(Brazil) BRA	P. Henrique	54	4	29	1	7	0	8	1	9+1	2
99	FW	(Argentina) ARG	Vegetti	60	26	27+7	14	8	1	8	5	10	6
	FW	(Brazil) BRA	Andrey	3	0	0	0	0	0	0	0	0+3	0
	DF	(Brazil) BRA	Avellar	1	0	0	0	0	0	0	0	0+1	0
	MF	(Brazil) BRA	L. Zuccarello	9	0	0+2	0	1	0	0+1	0	3+2	0
	DF	(Brazil) BRA	Walace	1	1	0	0	0	0	0	0	0+1	1
Player(s) who left on loan but featured this season
20	MF	(Argentina) ARG	Sforza	5	0	1+1	0	0	0	0	0	0+3	0
26	MF	(Switzerland) SUI	Dominguez	6	0	0	0	0	0	0	0	2+4	0
33	DF	(Brazil) BRA	Lyncon	1	0	0	0	0	0	0	0	1	0
45	FW	(Angola) ANG	L. Augusto	18	0	2+8	0	0+4	0	0+2	0	0+2	0
58	MF	(Brazil) BRA	Lucas Eduardo	1	0	0	0	0	0	0	0	0+1	0
98	MF	(Brazil) BRA	JP	2	0	0	0	0	0	0	0	1+1	0
Player(s) who left permanently but featured this season
5	MF	(Brazil) BRA	Souza	3	0	0	0	0	0	0	0	3	0
10	MF	(France) FRA	Payet	17	0	2+2	0	0+2	0	0+1	0	2+8	0
16	FW	(Brazil) BRA	Maxsuell	2	0	0	0	0	0	0	0	1+1	0
23	MF	(Brazil) BRA	Zé Gabriel	2	0	0	0	0	0	0	0	2	0
38	DF	(Brazil) BRA	João Victor	38	2	16	1	5	0	8	1	9	0
44	DF	(Brazil) BRA	Luiz Gustavo	11	0	3+2	0	1	0	2	0	3	0
70	FW	(Brazil) BRA	Serginho	3	0	0	0	0	0	0	0	3	0
90	FW	(Brazil) BRA	Teixeira	18	0	0+9	0	1+1	0	0+3	0	3+1	0
	MF	(Brazil) BRA	De Lucca	2	0	0	0	0	0	0	0	2	0
