= Léo Jacó =

Brazilian footballer

Personal information
- Full name: Leonardo Gomes da Silva Jacó
- Date of birth: 6 April 2005 (age 21)
- Place of birth: Magé, Brazil
- Position: Forward

Team information
- Current team: Santa Clara
- Number: 73

Youth career
- 2016–2025: Nova Iguaçu
- 2023–2025: → Vasco da Gama (loan)

Senior career*
Years	Team	Apps	(Gls)
2022–2025	Nova Iguaçu	10	(1)
2024–2025	→ Vasco da Gama (loan)	3	(0)
2026	Atlético Goianiense	31	(8)
2026–	Santa Clara	1	(0)
- * Club domestic league appearances and goals as of 29 August 2026

Leonardo Gomes da Silva "Léo" Jacó (born 6 April 2005) is a Brazilian professional footballer who plays as a forward for Primeira Liga club Santa Clara.

== Career ==
Born in Magé, Rio de Janeiro, Jacó joined Nova Iguaçu's youth sides in 2016, aged 11. He made his first team debut in 2022, aged 17, and scored a goal against Cianorte.

On 8 March 2023, Jacó joined Vasco da Gama on loan until October 2024, with a buyout clause; he initially returned to the under-20 team. He made his first team debut for the side on 18 January of the following year, coming on as a late substitute for Rodrigo in a 2–0 Campeonato Carioca home win over Boavista.

In October 2024, Jacó's loan was renewed until November 2025. He made his Série A debut on 17 August 2025, replacing David late into a 6–0 away routing of Santos.

On 11 August 2026, he signed a four-year contract with Santa Clara in Portugal.

== Career statistics ==
As of 29 August 2026

Appearances and goals by club, season and competition
Club	Season	League			State League		National Cup		League Cup		Continental		Other		Total	
Club	Season	Division	Apps	Goals	Apps	Goals	Apps	Goals	Apps	Goals	Apps	Goals	Apps	Goals	Apps	Goals
Nova Iguaçu	2022	Série D	3	1	—		—		—		—		2 (Note: Appearance(s) in Copa Rio)	0	5	1
Nova Iguaçu	2023	Série D	0	0	7	0	1	0	—		—		—		8	0
Nova Iguaçu	Total		3	1	7	0	1	0	—		—		2	0	13	1
Vasco da Gama (loan)	2024	Série A	0	0	1	0	0	0	—		—		—		1	0
Vasco da Gama (loan)	2025	Série A	2	0	0	0	0	0	—		0	0	—		2	0
Vasco da Gama (loan)	Total		2	0	1	0	0	0	—		0	0	—		3	0
Atlético Goianiense	2026	Série B	17	4	14	4	5	0	—		—		2 (Note: Appearances in Copa Verde)	0	48	8
Santa Clara	2026–27	Primeira Liga	1	0	—		0	0	0	0	—		—		1	0
Career total			23	5	22	4	6	0	0	0	0	0	4	0	65	9
