= 2026 Clube de Regatas Brasil season =

Clube de Regatas Brasil
2026 season
- President: Mário Marroquim
- Manager: Eduardo Barroca (until 4 July); Fábio Matias (from 5 July)
- Stadium: Estádio Rei Pelé
- Campeonato Brasileiro Série B: 5th
- Campeonato Alagoano: Winners
- Copa do Brasil: Fifth round
- Copa do Nordeste: Group stage
- Top goalscorer: League: Mikael (16); All: Mikael (19)
- Biggest win: CRB 6–0 Porto-BA
- Biggest defeat: Londrina 5–0 CRB
Home colours	Away colours

The 2026 season is the 108th in the history of Clube de Regatas Brasil and the 12th consecutive season in the Campeonato Brasileiro Série B. The club also competed in the Campeonato Alagoano, the Copa do Brasil, and the Copa do Nordeste.

== Transfers ==
=== In ===
Pos.	Player	Transferred from	Fee	Date	Source
MF	(Brazil) Guilherme Pato	(Brazil) América Mineiro	Free	18 December 2025	
FW	(Brazil) João Neto	(Brazil) Fluminense FC	Loan	18 December 2025	
MF	(Brazil) Luizão	(Brazil) Atlético Goianiense	Free	18 December 2025	
MF	(Brazil) Pedro Castro	(Brazil) Remo	Undisclosed	29 December 2025	
DF	(Brazil) Hereda	(Brazil) Sport Recife	Loan return	31 December 2025	
MF	(Brazil) Geovane	(Ukraine) FC Epitsentr Dunaivtsi	Loan	16 January 2026	
DF	(Brazil) Lyncon	(Brazil) Vasco da Gama	Loan	4 February 2026	
DF	(Brazil) Bressan	(Brazil) Chapecoense	Undisclosed	5 February 2026	
DF	(Brazil) Lucas Lovat	(Russia) Akhmat Grozny	Free	5 February 2026	
MF	(Brazil) Guilherme Estrella	(Brazil) Vasco da Gama	Loan	23 February 2026	
FW	(Brazil) Luiz Phellype	Unattached		6 February 2026	
DF	(Brazil) Kevin	(Brazil) Primavera	Loan	24 March 2026	
MF	(Brazil) Patrick de Lucca	(Brazil) Cuiabá	Free	27 March 2026	
DF	(Brazil) Reverson	Unattached		24 April 2026	

=== Out ===
Pos.	Player	Transferred to	Fee	Date	Source
MF	(Brazil) Gegê	(Brazil) Goiás	Loan	28 December 2025	
MF	(Brazil) Giovanni Piccolomo	(Brazil) Botafogo-PB	Free	1 January 2026	
MF	(Brazil) Higor Meritão	(Brazil) Chapecoense	Free	1 January 2026	
MF	(Brazil) Léo Pereira	(Bulgaria) CSKA Sofia	Undisclosed	5 January 2026	
DF	(Ecuador) Luis Segovia	(Ecuador) LDU Quito	Free	6 January 2026	
FW	(Uruguay) Facundo Barceló	(Uruguay) Liverpool	Free	10 January 2026	
FW	(Brazil) Breno Herculano	(South Korea) FC Anyang	Loan	24 January 2026	
DF	(Brazil) Darlisson Pereira	(Brazil) Anápolis	Loan	20 March 2026	
DF	(Brazil) Weverton	(Brazil) Londrina	Undisclosed	24 March 2026	
MF	(Brazil) Guilherme Estrella	(Brazil) Vasco da Gama	Loan retun	20 June 2026	
DF	(Brazil) Wallace	(Brazil) Grêmio	R$ 3 million	1 July 2026	

== Competitions ==
=== Campeonato Alagoano ===
==== Results by round ====
Round	1	2	3	4	5	6	7
Ground	H	H	A	H	A	H	A
Result	W	W	W	W	D	L	L
Position							

A = Away; H = Home; W = Win; D = Draw; L = Loss

10 January 2026 1	CRB	1–0	CSE

16 January 2026 2	CRB	3–2	Murici FC

18 January 2026 3	Penedense	0–1	CRB

22 January 2026 4	CRB	1–0	Cruzeiro U23

24 January 2026 5	CSA	1–1	CRB

31 January 2026 6	CRB	0–3	ASA

7 February 2026 7	Coruripe	2–1	CRB

==== Semi-finals ====
19 February 2026 First leg	CRB	2–0	CSA

21 February 2026 Second leg	CSA	0–2 (0–4 agg.)	CRB

==== Finals ====
28 February 2026 First leg	CRB	3–0	ASA

7 March 2026 Second leg	ASA	1–1 (1–4 agg.)	CRB

=== Copa do Brasil ===
==== Second round ====
4 March 2026	CRB (Alagoas)	6–0	(Bahia) Porto-BA

==== Third round ====
12 March 2026	Sousa (Paraíba)	0–2	(Alagoas) CRB

==== Fourth round ====
19 March 2026	CRB (Alagoas)	1–0	(Santa Catarina (state)) Figueirense

==== Fifth round ====
23 April 2026 First leg	Fortaleza (Ceará)	2–1	(Alagoas) CRB

15 May 2026 Second leg	CRB (Alagoas)	0–0 (1–2 agg.)	(Ceará) Fortaleza

=== Copa do Nordeste ===
==== Group stage ====
Round	1	2	3	4	5
Ground	A	H	A	A	H
Result	D	L	L	D	W
Position					

A = Away; H = Home; W = Win; D = Draw; L = Loss

25 March 2026 1	Itabaiana (Sergipe)	0–0	(Alagoas) CRB

28 March 2026 2	CRB (Alagoas)	2–4	(Bahia) Vitória

10 April 2026 3	ASA (Alagoas)	2–0	(Alagoas) CRB

16 April 2026 4	Fluminense-PI (Piauí)	0–0	(Alagoas) CRB

30 April 2026 5	CRB (Alagoas)	3–0	(Paraíba) Sousa

=== Campeonato Brasileiro Série B ===
Pos	Team	Pld	W	D	L	GF	GA	GD	Pts	Promotion or relegation
3	Vila Nova	26	13	5	8	37	30	+7	44	Advance to the promotion play-offs
4	Novorizontino	25	12	7	6	41	22	+19	43	Advance to the promotion play-offs
5	CRB	26	12	6	8	40	36	+4	42	Advance to the promotion play-offs
6	Fortaleza	25	11	8	6	28	22	+6	41	Advance to the promotion play-offs
7	Atlético Goianiense	25	10	9	6	28	23	+5	39	

Updated to match(es) played on 4 September 2026. Source: CBF
Rules for classification: 1) points; 2) wins; 3) goal difference; 4) goals scored; 5) head-to-head results (only between 2 teams); 6) fewest red cards; 7) fewest yellow cards; 8) drawing of lots.

==== Results by round ====
Round	1	2	3	4	5	6	7	8	9	10	11	12	13	14	15	16	17	18	19	20	21	22	23	24	25	26
Ground	A	H	A	H	H	A	A	H	A	H	A	H	A	H	A	A	H	H	A	H	A	H	A	A	H	H
Result	D	L	D	L	L	L	W	W	W	W	L	L	D	D	W	L	D	W	W	W	W	D	W	L	W	W
Position	8	13	14	18	19	19	18	17	13	8	12	15	15	16	14	15	15	13	12	8						

Updated to match(es) played on 4 September 2026. Source:
A = Away; H = Home; W = Win; D = Draw; L = Loss

==== Matches ====
21 March 2026 1	Vila Nova	2–2	CRB

2 April 2026 2	CRB	0–1	Avaí	Maceió
				Stadium: Estádio Rei Pelé

5 April 2026 3	Novorizontino	1–1	CRB

13 April 2026 4	CRB	2–3	Athletic	Maceió
				Stadium: Estádio Rei Pelé

19 April 2026 5	CRB	0–1	Juventude	Maceió
				Stadium: Estádio Rei Pelé

27 April 2026 6	Criciúma	3–1	CRB

4 May 2026 7	América Mineiro	1–2	CRB

10 May 2026 8	CRB	3–0	Operário Ferroviário	Maceió
				Stadium: Estádio Rei Pelé

18 May 2026 9	Sport	1–2	CRB

24 May 2026 10	CRB	4–2	Ponte Preta	Maceió
				Stadium: Estádio Rei Pelé

1 June 2026 11	Cuiabá	2–0	CRB

7 June 2026 12	CRB	2–3	São Bernardo	Maceió
				Stadium: Estádio Rei Pelé

13 June 2026 13	Atlético Goianiense	3–3	CRB

21 June 2026 14	CRB	1–1	Fortaleza	Maceió
				Stadium: Estádio Rei Pelé

1 July 2026 15	Botafogo-SP	0–1	CRB

4 July 2026 16	Londrina	5–0	CRB

13 July 2026 17	CRB	2–2	Goiás	Maceió
				Stadium: Estádio Rei Pelé

17 July 2026 18	CRB	2–1	Náutico	Maceió
				Stadium: Estádio Rei Pelé

23 July 2026 19	Ceará	0–1	CRB

28 July 2026 20	CRB	2–0	Vila Nova	Maceió
				Stadium: Estádio Rei Pelé

11 August 2026 21	Avaí	0–1	CRB	Florianópolis
19:30 UTC−3			Bressan 34'	Stadium: Estádio da Ressacada; Referee: Alex Gomes Stefano

16 August 2026 22	CRB	0–0	Novorizontino	Maceió
18:30 UTC−3				Stadium: Estádio Rei Pelé; Referee: Leonardo Willers Lorenzatto

20 August 2026 23	Athletic	0–2	CRB	São João del Rei
19:30

25 August 2026 24	Juventude	2–1	CRB	Caxias do Sul
19:30

30 August 2026 25	CRB	2–1	Criciúma	Maceió
18:00	Crystopher 43'; Danielzinho 58'		Diego Gonçalves 45+1'	Stadium: Estádio Rei Pelé

4 September 2026 26	CRB	3–1	América Mineiro	Maceió
21:30				Stadium: Estádio Rei Pelé; Referee: Marianna Nanni Batalha
