= Paulo Henrique (footballer, born July 1996) =

Brazilian footballer

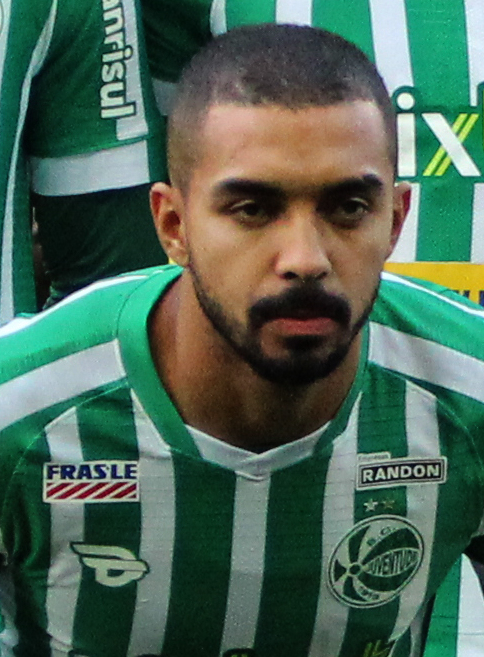
- Paulo Henrique with Juventude in 2022

Personal information
- Full name: Paulo Henrique de Oliveira Alves
- Date of birth: 25 July 1996 (age 30)
- Place of birth: Sete Barras, São Paulo, Brazil
- Height: 1.75 m (5 ft 9 in)
- Position: Right-back

Team information
- Current team: Vasco da Gama
- Number: 96

Youth career
- Londrina

Senior career*
Years	Team	Apps	(Gls)
2016–2019	Londrina	0	(0)
2016–2017	→ Iraty (loan)	3	(0)
2017	→ Operário Ferroviário (loan)	0	(0)
2018	→ União Beltrão (loan)	4	(0)
2018−2019	→ Metropolitano (loan)	29	(2)
2019	Atlético Tubarão	11	(0)
2020–2021	Paraná	40	(1)
2021–2022	Juventude	55	(2)
2023	Atlético Mineiro	3	(0)
2023	→ Vasco da Gama (loan)	14	(1)
2024–	Vasco da Gama	93	(4)

International career^{‡}
2025–	Brazil	2	(1)
- * Club domestic league appearances and goals as of 8 April 2026 ‡ National team caps and goals as of 12:43, 14 October 2025 (UTC)

Paulo Henrique de Oliveira Alves (born 25 July 1996), known as Paulo Henrique (Brazilian Portuguese: [ˈpawlu ẽˈʁiki]), is a Brazilian footballer who plays as right-back for Vasco da Gama and the Brazil national team.

== Club career ==
=== Londrina ===
Born in Sete Barras, São Paulo, Paulo Henrique is a Londrina youth graduate. He made his first team debut on 16 March 2016, starting in a 1–0 away win against Parauapebas for the year's Copa do Brasil.

After being rarely used, Paulo Henrique served loans at Iraty, Operário Ferroviário, União Beltrão and Metropolitano.

=== Atlético Tubarão ===
On 1 August 2019, Paulo Henrique moved to Atlético Tubarão. He was an undisputed starter during the year's Copa Santa Catarina.

=== Paraná ===
On 10 January 2020, Paulo Henrique agreed to a deal with Série B side Paraná. After impressing with the club, he renewed his contract until December 2021 on 7 October.

=== Juventude ===
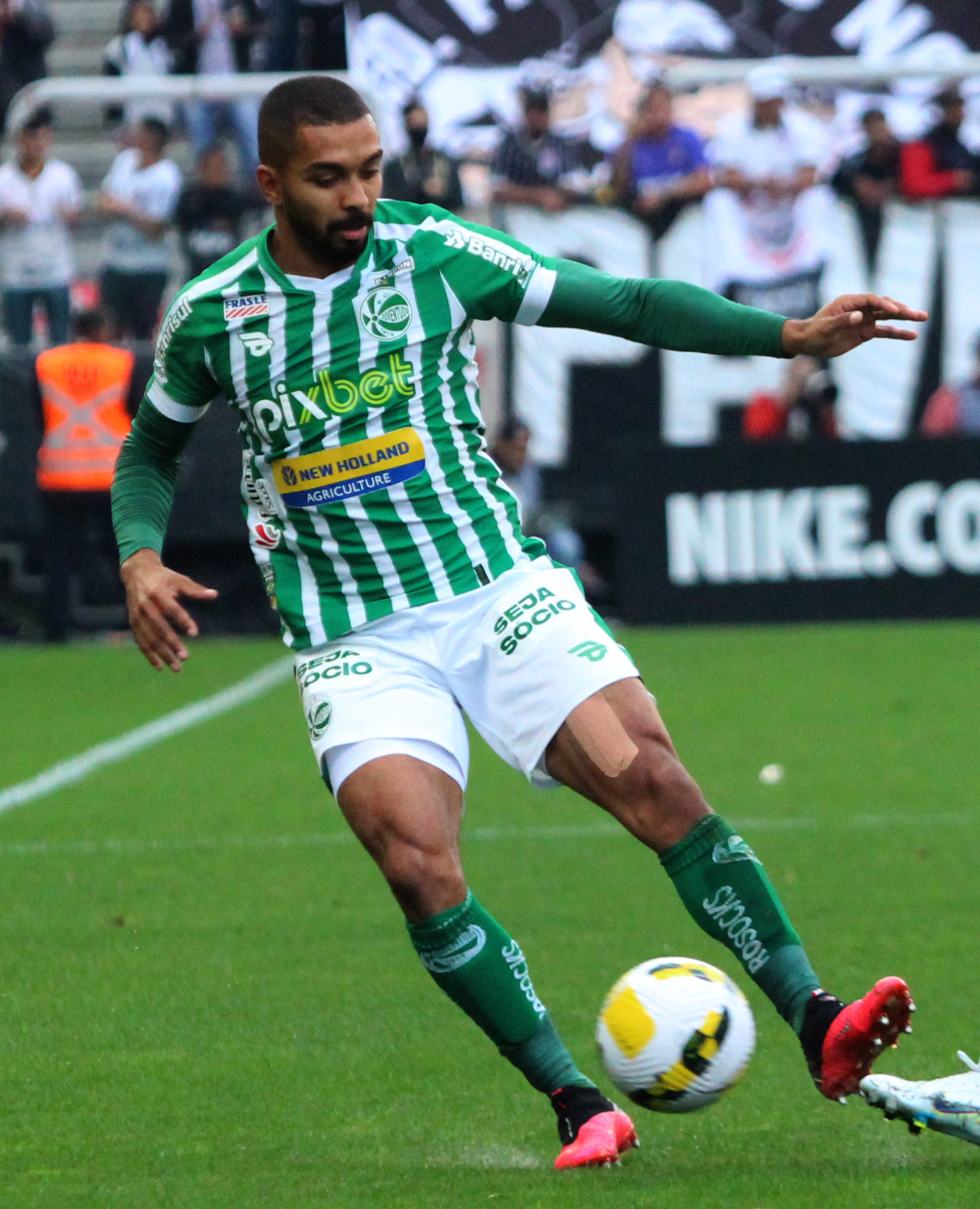
Paulo Henrique playing for Juventude in 2022

On 24 February 2021, Paulo Henrique was announced at Juventude, newly promoted to Série A. He made his top tier debut on 30 May, replacing Michel Macedo in a 2–2 away draw against Cuiabá.

A backup to Michel Macedo during his first year, Paulo Henrique became a starter in the 2022 season, despite playing some matches as a right midfielder.

=== Atlético Mineiro ===
On 3 January 2023, Paulo Henrique joined Atlético Mineiro on a two-year deal.

=== Vasco da Gama ===
On 25 February 2023, Paulo Henrique signed a season-long loan deal with Vasco da Gama. Mainly a backup to José Luis Rodríguez throughout the season, he scored the lone goal in a Clássico da Amizade match on 6 November, putting pressure against Botafogo, who were first in the table at the time of when the game was played.

With good performances by the end of the 2023 season, Paulo Henrique was acquired definitely for US$1,000,000 by Vasco on 27 December of that year. He subsequently established himself as a regular starter ahead of Rodríguez, and renewed his contract until 2028 on 8 April 2025.

== International career ==
On 5 October 2025, Paulo Henrique was called up to the Brazil national team by head coach Carlo Ancelotti for two friendlies against South Korea and Japan, after Wesley had to withdraw due to an injury.

== Career statistics ==
=== Club ===
As of match played 5 October 2025

Appearances and goals by club, season and competition
Club	Season	League			State league (Note: Includes Campeonato Paranaense, Campeonato Catarinense, Campeonato Gaúcho, Campeonato Carioca, Campeonato Mineiro)		Copa do Brasil		South America		Other		Total	
Club	Season	Division	Apps	Goals	Apps	Goals	Apps	Goals	Apps	Goals	Apps	Goals	Apps	Goals
Londrina	2016	Série B	0	0	0	0	1	0	—		—		1	0
Iraty (loan)	2016	Paranaense Série Bronze	—		1	0	—		—		—		1	0
Iraty (loan)	2017	Paranaense Série Prata	—		2	0	—		—		—		2	0
Iraty (loan)	Total		—		3	0	—		—		—		3	0
Operário Ferroviário (loan)	2017	Série D	0	0	—		—		—		5 (Note: Appearances in Taça FPF)	1	5	1
União Beltrão (loan)	2018	Paranaense	—		4	0	—		—		—		4	0
Metropolitano (loan)	2018	Catarinense Série B	—		18	1	—		—		8 (Note: Appearances in Copa Santa Catarina)	0	26	1
Metropolitano (loan)	2019	Catarinense	—		11	1	—		—		—		11	1
Metropolitano (loan)	Total		—		29	2	—		—		8	0	37	2
Atlético Tubarão	2019	Série D	0	0	—		—		—		11	0	11	0
Paraná	2020	Série B	34	1	6	0	4	0	—		—		44	1
Juventude	2021	Série A	17	0	11	0	2	0	—		—		30	0
Juventude	2022	Série A	26	2	1	0	2	0	—		—		29	2
Juventude	Total		43	2	12	0	4	0	—		—		59	2
Atlético Mineiro	2023	Série A	0	0	3	0	0	0	0	0	—		3	0
Vasco da Gama	2023	Série A	14	1	—		—		—		—		14	1
Vasco da Gama	2024	Série A	35	1	9	0	9	0	—		—		53	1
Vasco da Gama	2025	Série A	21	1	10	2	8	0	8 (Note: Appearances in Copa Sudamericana)	1	—		47	4
Vasco da Gama	Total		70	3	19	2	17	0	8	1	—		114	6
Career total			147	6	76	4	26	0	8	1	24	1	281	12

=== International ===
As of match played 14 October 2025

Appearances and goals by national team and year
National team	Year	Apps	Goals
Brazil	2025	2	1
Total		2	1

Scores and results list Brazil's goal tally first.

List of international goals scored by Paulo Henrique
No.	Date	Venue	Cap	Opponent	Score	Result	Competition
1	14 October 2025	Ajinomoto Stadium, Chōfu, Japan	2	Japan	1–0	2–3	2025 Kirin Challenge Cup

== Honours ==
Operário Ferroviário

- Campeonato Brasileiro Série D: 2017

Metropolitano

- Campeonato Catarinense Série B: 2018

Individual

- Bola de Prata: 2025
- Campeonato Brasileiro Série A Team of the Year: 2025
