= João Victor (footballer, born 1998) =

Brazilian footballer

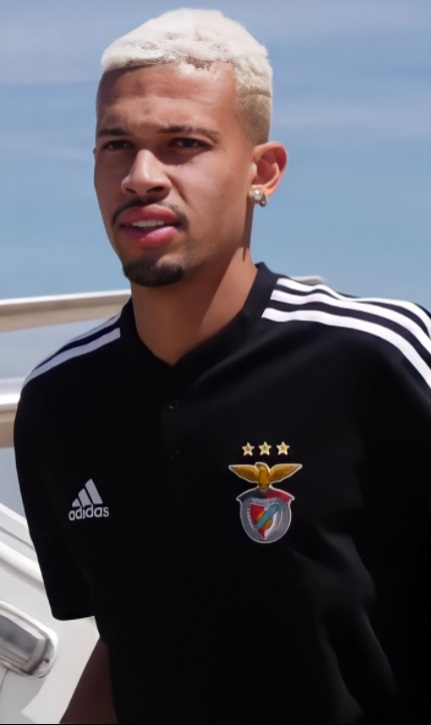
- João Victor with Benfica in 2022

Personal information
- Full name: João Victor da Silva Marcelino
- Date of birth: 17 July 1998 (age 28)
- Place of birth: Bauru, Brazil
- Height: 1.89 m (6 ft 2 in)
- Position: Centre-back

Team information
- Current team: CSKA Moscow
- Number: 4

Youth career
- Noroeste
- 2014–2015: Botafogo-SP
- 2015–2017: Coimbra
- 2015–2017: → Atlético Mineiro (loan)
- 2017: → Corinthians (loan)
- 2018–2019: Corinthians

Senior career*
Years	Team	Apps	(Gls)
2019–2022	Corinthians	64	(0)
2019–2020	→ Inter de Limeira (loan)	9	(0)
2020–2021	→ Atlético Goianiense (loan)	30	(0)
2022–2023	Benfica	2	(0)
2022–2023	→ Nantes (loan)	13	(0)
2024–2025	Vasco da Gama	57	(2)
2025–	CSKA Moscow	33	(0)
- * Club domestic league appearances and goals as of 21 November 2026

João Victor da Silva Marcelino (born 17 July 1998), known as João Victor, is a Brazilian professional footballer who plays as a centre-back for Russian club CSKA Moscow.

== Club career ==
=== Corinthians ===
Born in Bauru, São Paulo, João Victor joined Corinthians' youth setup for the 2017 season, on loan from Coimbra. The club subsequently bought 55% of his economic rights, with the player signing a permanent contract until July 2021.

In November 2019, after making his senior debut with the B-team in the Copa Paulista, João Victor was loaned to Inter de Limeira for the 2020 Campeonato Paulista. He immediately became a starter at the side, and subsequently joined Série A side Atlético Goianiense on 29 June 2020, also in a temporary deal.

João Victor made his top tier debut on 30 August 2020, coming on as a late substitute for Dudu in a 2–0 home loss against Ceará.

=== Benfica ===
On 8 July 2022, Victor signed a five-year contract with Portuguese club Benfica for a fee of €8.5 million for 80% of his economic rights. After being sidelined with an ankle injury for three months, he made his debut for the club on 15 October, replacing António Silva in the 91st minute in the 1–1 draw to Liga 3 side Caldas in the third round of the Taça de Portugal, after extra-time, which Benfica went on to win 6–4 in a penalty shoot-out.

After making three appearances during Benfica's opening half of the season, on 25 January 2023, Victor joined French Ligue 1 club Nantes on loan until the rest of the season.

=== Vasco da Gama ===
On 31 December 2023, João Victor returned to Brazil, signing a five-year contract with Série A side Vasco da Gama, for a reported fee of €6 million, which could rise to €8 million with add-ons.

=== CSKA Moscow ===
On 20 August 2025, João Victor signed a four-season contract with Russian Premier League club CSKA Moscow.

== Career statistics ==
As of match played 21 November 2026

Appearances and goals by club, season and competition
Club	Season	League			State League		National cup (Note: Includes Copa do Brasil, Taça de Portugal and Coupe de France)		Continental		Other		Total	
Club	Season	Division	Apps	Goals	Apps	Goals	Apps	Goals	Apps	Goals	Apps	Goals	Apps	Goals
Corinthians	2019	Série A	0	0	—		0	0	—		4 (Note: Appearance(s) in Copa Paulista)	0	4	0
Corinthians	2020	Série A	0	0	—		—		—		—		0	0
Corinthians	2021	Série A	36	0	8	0	1	0	3 (Note: Appearance(s) in Copa Sudamericana)	0	—		48	0
Corinthians	2022	Série A	7	0	13	0	2	0	6	0	—		28	0
Corinthians	Total		43	0	21	0	3	0	9	0	4	0	80	0
Inter de Limeira (loan)	2020	Paulista	—		9	0	—		—		—		9	0
Atlético Goianiense (loan)	2020	Série A	27	0	3	0	5	0	—		—		35	0
Benfica	2022–23	Primeira Liga	0	0	—		1	0	0	0	2 (Note: Appearances in Taça da Liga)	0	3	0
Benfica	2023–24	Primeira Liga	2	0	—		0	0	0	0	0	0	2	0
Benfica	Total		2	0	—		1	0	0	0	2	0	5	0
Nantes (loan)	2022–23	Ligue 1	13	0	—		3	0	—		—		16	0
Vasco da Gama	2024	Série A	23	1	9	0	5	0	—		—		37	1
Vasco da Gama	2025	Série A	16	1	9	0	5	0	8	1	—		38	2
Vasco da Gama	Total		39	2	18	0	10	0	8	1	—		75	2
CSKA Moscow	2025–26	Russian Premier League	19	0	—		8	0	—		—		27	0
CSKA Moscow	2026–27	Russian Premier League	14	0	—		2	1	—		—		16	1
CSKA Moscow	Total		33	0	—		10	1	—		—		43	1
Career total			157	2	51	0	32	1	17	1	6	0	263	4

== Honours ==
Benfica

- Supertaça Cândido de Oliveira: 2023
