= João Pedro (footballer, born 2005) =

Brazilian footballer

JP
Personal information
- Full name: João Pedro Murilo de Paula Morais
- Date of birth: 19 April 2005 (age 21)
- Place of birth: Goiânia, Brazil
- Height: 1.76 m (5 ft 9 in)
- Position: Midfielder

Team information
- Current team: Casa Pia
- Number: 98

Youth career
- Goiás
- 2019–2024: Vasco da Gama

Senior career*
Years	Team	Apps	(Gls)
2024–2026	Vasco da Gama	17	(0)
2025	→ Avaí (loan)	28	(5)
2026–	Casa Pia	1	(0)
- * Club domestic league appearances and goals as of 6 September 2026

João Pedro Murilo de Paula Morais (born 19 April 2005), known as João Pedro or just JP, is a Brazilian professional footballer who plays as a midfielder for Primeira Liga club Casa Pia in Portugal.

== Career ==
Born in Goiânia, Goiás, JP joined Vasco da Gama's youth sides in 2019, from Goiás EC. On 4 May 2022, he signed his first professional contract with the club, after agreeing to a three-year deal.

On 30 December 2023, JP further extended his link with Vasco until December 2027. Initially a member of the under-20 squad for the 2024 Copa São Paulo de Futebol Júnior, he was called up to the main squad on 7 January 2024, and had to leave the competition.

JP made his first team – and Série A – debut on 14 April 2024, coming on as a second-half substitute for Pablo Galdames in a 2–1 home win over Grêmio.

== Career statistics ==
As of 9 February 2026

Appearances and goals by club, season and competition
Club	Season	League			State League		National Cup		Continental		Other		Total	
Club	Season	Division	Apps	Goals	Apps	Goals	Apps	Goals	Apps	Goals	Apps	Goals	Apps	Goals
Vasco da Gama	2024	Série A	10	0	0	0	1	0	—		—		11	0
Vasco da Gama	2025	Série A	—		2	0	—		—		—		2	0
Vasco da Gama	2026	Série A	0	0	3	0	0	0	0	0	—		3	0
Vasco da Gama	Total		10	0	5	0	1	0	0	0	—		16	0
Avaí (loan)	2025	Série B	28	5	—		—		—		—		28	5
Career total			38	5	5	0	1	0	0	0	0	0	44	5
