= Reverson =

Reverson is a name. Notable people with the name include:

- Reverson (Brazilian footballer) (born 1997), Reverson Valuarth Paiva Silva, Brazilian football left-back
- Damienus Reverson (born 2003), Dutch football midfielder
- Paul Reverson (born 2005), Ghanaian football goalkeeper
