= Pablo Vegetti =

Argentine footballer (born 1988)

Personal information
- Full name: Pablo Ezequiel Vegetti Pfaffen
- Date of birth: 15 October 1988 (age 38)
- Place of birth: Santa Fe, Argentina
- Height: 1.88 m (6 ft 2 in)
- Position: Forward

Team information
- Current team: Cerro Porteño

Senior career*
Years	Team	Apps	(Gls)
2012–2013	Villa San Carlos	40	(24)
2013–2014	Rangers de Talca	16	(2)
2014	→ Ferro Carril Oeste (loan)	20	(6)
2014	→ Gimnasia LP (loan)	17	(7)
2015–2016	Gimnasia LP	27	(1)
2015–2016	→ Colón (loan)	18	(2)
2017–2018	Boca Unidos	22	(9)
2018–2019	Instituto	23	(15)
2019–2023	Belgrano	106	(59)
2023–2026	Vasco da Gama	111	(46)
2026–	Cerro Porteño	0	(0)
- * Club domestic league appearances and goals as of 17 January 2026

Pablo Ezequiel Vegetti Pfaffen (born 15 October 1988) is an Argentine professional footballer who plays as a forward for Paraguayan Primera División club Cerro Porteño.

== Career ==
Vegetti started his professional career playing for Club Colón de San Justo of the Liga Santafesina de Fútbol. After scoring 33 goals in 40 games, he signed for Villa San Carlos, playing in the Primera B Metropolitana. He scored 24 goals for Villa San Carlos, helping the team to gain promotion to Primera B Nacional, the second tier of Argentina's professional soccer.

=== C.S.D. Rangers ===
In August 2013, he signed for Rangers, which bought 50% of his economic rights. After a mediocre performance in the Chilean team, in February 2014, he was loaned to Ferro Carril Oeste to play in the Primera B Nacional. He scored six goals in 20 games for Ferro. When he had everything set up to re-sign with Ferro, he unexpectedly signed for Gimnasia y Esgrima de La Plata. Technically, he was on loan to Gimnasia from Rangers for 18 months.

=== Vasco da Gama ===
On 4 August 2023, he joined Campeonato Brasileiro Série A side Vasco da Gama. In his first match for the Brazilian club, on 6 August 2023, against Grêmio, Vegetti scored the goal that guaranteed Vasco's victory, the first of the season at São Januário. In the 2024 season, Vegetti was Vasco's top scorer with 23 goals (considering the state league) and in the Copa do Brasil with 7 goals. After a victory over Puerto Cabello in the 2025 Copa Sudamericana, Vegetti became the second highest foreign scorer in Vasco's history with 44 goals. In the 2025 season, Vegetti was the Brazilian football's top goalscorer with 27 goals. Since joining the club in August 2023, Vegetti has played 143 games and scored 60 goals.

=== Cerro Porteño ===
At the beginning of 2026 season, Vegetti informed Vasco da Gama of his desire to leave the club, and the board of directors did not object to the player's departure. On 17 January 2026, he moved to Paraguayan Primera División club Cerro Porteño, signing a three-year contract.

== Style of play ==
Pablo Vegetti plays as a centre-forward and is known for his style of play that focuses on aerial play and physical strength. He stands out for his ability to finish with his head, taking advantage of his good momentum, height and positioning inside the area. He is considered by many to be one of the best headers in football. Vegetti also stands out for his first-time finishes, whether with his head or with his feet. In addition, Vegetti seeks associations with his teammates in attack and helps to retain the ball, being a player who troubles the opposing defense.

After scoring a goal, Vegetti is known for performing a "pirate" celebration, in which he places one hand in front of one eye and the other pointing forward. This celebration has earned him the affectionate nickname "Pirate" from fans.

== Career statistics ==
As of 15 January 2026

Appearances and goals by club, season and competition
Club	Season	League			State league (Note: Includes Campeonato Carioca)		National cup (Note: Includes Copa Chile, Copa Argentina, Copa do Brasil)		Continental		Other		Total	
Club	Season	Division	Apps	Goals	Apps	Goals	Apps	Goals	Apps	Goals	Apps	Goals	Apps	Goals
Villa San Carlos	2012–13	Primera B Metropolitana	40	24	—		0	0	—		—		40	24
Rangers de Talca	2013–14	Chilean Primera División	16	2	—		3	1	—		—		19	3
Ferro Carril Oeste	2013–14	Primera Nacional	20	6	—		1	0	—		—		21	6
Gimnasia La Plata	2014	Argentine Primera División	17	7	—		1	0	2	0	—		20	7
Gimnasia La Plata	2015	Argentine Primera División	14	1	—		1	0	—		—		15	1
Gimnasia La Plata	2016–17	Argentine Primera División	13	0	—		4	1	—		1	1	18	2
Gimnasia La Plata	Total		44	8	0	0	6	1	2	0	1	1	53	10
Colón	2015	Argentine Primera División	15	2	—		—		—		0	0	15	2
Colón	2016	Argentine Primera División	3	0	—		1	0	—		—		4	0
Colón	Total		18	2	0	0	1	0	0	0	0	0	19	2
Boca Unidos	2016–17	Primera B Nacional	22	9	—		—		—		—		22	9
Instituto	2017–18	Primera B Nacional	23	15	—		—		—		—		23	15
Belgrano	2018–19	Primera B Nacional	20	14	—		1	0	—		—		21	14
Belgrano	2019–20	Primera Nacional	7	3	—		0	0	—		0	0	7	3
Belgrano	2021	Primera Nacional	31	17	—		0	0	—		0	0	31	17
Belgrano	2022	Primera Nacional	34	17	—		3	0	—		0	0	37	17
Belgrano	2023	Argentine Primera División	27	13	—		0	0	—		0	0	27	13
Belgrano	Total		106	59	0	0	4	0	0	0	0	0	110	59
Vasco da Gama	2023	Série A	21	10	—		—		—		—		21	10
Vasco da Gama	2024	Série A	35	12	9	4	10	7	—		—		54	23
Vasco da Gama	2025	Série A	35	14	10	6	12	2	8	5	—		65	27
Vasco da Gama	2026	Série A	0	0	1	0	0	0	0	0	—		1	0
Vasco da Gama	Total		91	36	20	10	22	9	8	5	0	0	141	60
Career total			380	161	20	10	37	11	10	5	1	1	448	188

== Honours ==
Villa San Carlos

- Primera B Metropolitana: 2012–13

Belgrano

- Primera Nacional: 2022

Vasco da Gama

- Copa do Brasil runner-up: 2025

Individual

- Argentine Primera División top scorer: 2023
- Copa do Brasil top scorer: 2024 (7 goals)
- Campeonato Carioca top scorer: 2025 (6 goals)
