= Lukas Zuccarello =

Brazilian footballer

Personal information
- Full name: Lukas Rocha Zuccarello
- Date of birth: 2 December 2006 (age 19)
- Place of birth: São Paulo, Brazil
- Height: 1.75 m (5 ft 9 in)
- Position: Attacking midfielder

Team information
- Current team: Vasco da Gama
- Number: 86

Youth career
- 2017–2018: Corinthians
- 2019: Nacional-SP
- 2021–2022: Sport Recife
- 2022–2025: Vasco da Gama

Senior career*
Years	Team	Apps	(Gls)
2025–	Vasco da Gama	2	(0)
- * Club domestic league appearances and goals as of 21 April 2025

Lukas Rocha Zuccarello (born 2 December 2006), known as Lukas Zuccarello, is a Brazilian footballer who plays as an attacking midfielder for Vasco da Gama.

== Career ==
Lukas joined Vasco in 2022. On 29 January 2025, he made his professional debut against Maricá in the Campeonato Carioca.

== Career statistics ==
As of 19 April 2025

Club	Season	League			State League		Cup		Continental		Other		Total	
Club	Season	Division	Apps	Goals	Apps	Goals	Apps	Goals	Apps	Goals	Apps	Goals	Apps	Goals
Vasco da Gama	2025	Série A	1	0	5	0	1	0	0	0	0	0	1	0
Vasco da Gama	Total		1	0	0	0	0	0	0	0	0	0	1	0
