= Bruno Lopes (footballer, born 2007) =

Brazilian footballer

Personal information
- Full name: Bruno Lopes Ferreira
- Date of birth: 25 July 2007 (age 19)
- Place of birth: Tupã, Brazil
- Height: 1.82 m (6 ft 0 in)
- Position: Forward

Team information
- Current team: Vasco da Gama
- Number: 72

Youth career
- Azuriz
- 2023–: Vasco da Gama

Senior career*
Years	Team	Apps	(Gls)
2024–	Vasco da Gama	1	(0)
- * Club domestic league appearances and goals as of 21:34, 12 July 2024 (UTC)

Bruno Lopes Ferreira (born 25 July 2007), known as Bruno Lopes, is a Brazilian professional footballer who plays as a forward for Vasco da Gama.

== Career ==
Born in Tupã, São Paulo, Bruno Lopes joined Vasco da Gama's youth sides in March 2023, from Azuriz. On 21 February 2024, he signed his first professional contract with the club, after agreeing to a deal until January 2027.

Bruno Lopes made his first team – and Série A – debut on 10 July 2024, coming on as a late substitute for Adson in a 2–0 home win over Corinthians.

== Personal life ==
Bruno Lopes' younger brother, Matheus, is also a footballer and a forward. He too plays at Vasco.

== Career statistics ==
As of 12 July 2024

Appearances and goals by club, season and competition
Club	Season	League			State League		National Cup		Continental		Other		Total	
Club	Season	Division	Apps	Goals	Apps	Goals	Apps	Goals	Apps	Goals	Apps	Goals	Apps	Goals
Vasco da Gama	2024	Série A	1	0	0	0	0	0	—		—		1	0
Career total			1	0	0	0	0	0	0	0	0	0	1	0
