= David (footballer, born October 1995) =

Brazilian footballer

Personal information
- Full name: David Corrêa da Fonseca
- Date of birth: 17 October 1995 (age 31)
- Place of birth: Vitória, Brazil
- Height: 1.79 m (5 ft 10 1/2 in)
- Position: Winger

Team information
- Current team: Vasco da Gama
- Number: 7

Youth career
- Vitória

Senior career*
Years	Team	Apps	(Gls)
2015–2017	Vitória	90	(13)
2018–2019	Cruzeiro	58	(4)
2020–2022	Fortaleza	69	(14)
2022–2024	Internacional	32	(2)
2023	→ São Paulo (loan)	30	(3)
2024	→ Vasco da Gama (loan)	34	(6)
2025–	Vasco da Gama	38	(4)
- * Club domestic league appearances and goals as of 8 April 2026

David Corrêa da Fonseca (born 17 October 1995), simply known as David or by the acronym DVD, is a Brazilian footballer who plays as a winger for Vasco da Gama.

== Career ==
=== Vitória ===
David made his league debut for Vitória against Confiança on 19 March 2015. He scored his first goal for the club against Paraná on 11 July 2015, scoring in the 61st minute.

=== Cruzeiro ===
David made his league debut for Cruzeiro against Fluminense on 22 April 2018. He scored his first goal for the club against Corinthians on 14 November 2018, scoring in the 14th minute.

=== Fortaleza ===
David scored on his league debut for Fortaleza against Santa Cruz on 8 February 2020, scoring in the 31st minute.

=== Internacional ===
David made his league debut for Internacional against União RS on 29 January 2022. He scored his first league goal for the club against Aimoré on 6 March 2022, scoring in the 33rd minute.

=== São Paulo ===
David scored on his league debut for São Paulo against Ferroviária on 19 January 2023, scoring in the 50th minute.

=== Vasco da Gama ===
David made his league debut for Vasco da Gama against Madureira on 26 January 2024. He scored his first goal for the club against Audax Rio on 9 February 2024, scoring in the 37th minute.

== Career statistics ==
As of match played 7 December 2025

Appearances and goals by club, season and competition
Club	Season	League			State league		Copa do Brasil		Continental		Other		Total	
Club	Season	Division	Apps	Goals	Apps	Goals	Apps	Goals	Apps	Goals	Apps	Goals	Apps	Goals
Vitória	2015	Série B	3	2	0	0	0	0	—		—		3	2
Vitória	2016	Série A	17	2	0	0	0	0	1 (Note: Appearance(s) in Copa Sudamericana)	0	—		18	2
Vitória	2017	Série A	35	6	12 (Note: Appearance(s) in Campeonato Baiano)	2	0	0	—		6 (Note: Appearance(s) in Copa do Nordeste)	3	53	11
Vitória	Total		55	10	12	2	0	0	1	0	6	3	74	15
Cruzeiro	2018	Série A	19	1	0	0	2	0	—		—		21	1
Cruzeiro	2019	Série A	33	0	6 (Note: Appearance(s) in Campeonato Mineiro)	3	4	0	5 (Note: Appearance(s) in Copa Libertadores)	0	—		48	3
Cruzeiro	Total		52	1	6	3	6	0	5	0	—		69	4
Fortaleza	2020	Série A	35	7	0	0	2	2	2	0	8	3	47	12
Fortaleza	2021	Série A	32	5	2 (Note: Appearance(s) in Campeonato Cearense)	2	7	4	—		8	2	49	13
Fortaleza	Total		67	12	2	2	9	6	2	0	16	5	96	25
Internacional	2022	Série A	21	0	11 (Note: Appearance(s) in Campeonato Gaúcho)	2	0	0	6	0	—		38	2
Internacional	2023	Série A	0	0	0	0	0	0	0	0	—		0	0
Internacional	2024	Série A	0	0	0	0	0	0	0	0	—		0	0
Internacional	Total		21	0	11	2	0	0	6	0	—		38	2
São Paulo (loan)	2023	Série A	22	2	8 (Note: Appearance(s) in Campeonato Paulista)	1	5	1	4	1	—		39	5
Vasco da Gama (loan)	2024	Série A	23	4	11 (Note: Appearance(s) in Campeonato Carioca)	2	5	1	—		—		39	7
Vasco da Gama	2025	Série A	23	2	0	0	4	0	2	0	—		29	2
Career total			263	31	50	12	29	8	20	1	22	8	384	60

== Honours ==
Vitória

- Campeonato Baiano: 2016, 2017

Cruzeiro

- Campeonato Mineiro: 2018, 2019
- Copa do Brasil: 2018

Fortaleza

- Campeonato Cearense: 2020, 2021

São Paulo

- Copa do Brasil: 2023
