= Riquelme Avellar =

Brazilian footballer

Personal information
- Full name: Riquelme Avellar da Silva Fortes
- Date of birth: 8 March 2006 (age 20)
- Place of birth: Rio de Janeiro, Brazil
- Position: Left-back

Team information
- Current team: Vasco da Gama
- Number: 82

Youth career
- 2018–: Vasco da Gama

Senior career*
Years	Team	Apps	(Gls)
2025–	Vasco da Gama	2	(0)
- * Club domestic league appearances and goals as of 17:17, 2 April 2026 (UTC)

Riquelme Avellar da Silva Fortes (born 8 March 2006), known as Riquelme Avellar or just Avellar, is a Brazilian professional footballer who plays as a left-back for Vasco da Gama.

== Career ==
Born in Rio de Janeiro, Avellar joined Vasco da Gama's youth sides in 2018, aged 11. On 10 August 2023, he signed his first professional contract with the club, agreeing to a deal until January 2026.

Avellar made his first team debut on 11 January 2025, coming on as a late substitute for Maxsuell in a 1–1 Campeonato Carioca away draw against Nova Iguaçu. On 9 October, he renewed his link until July 2028.

== Career statistics ==
As of 5 May 2026

Appearances and goals by club, season and competition
Club	Season	League			State League		National Cup		Continental		Other		Total	
Club	Season	Division	Apps	Goals	Apps	Goals	Apps	Goals	Apps	Goals	Apps	Goals	Apps	Goals
Vasco da Gama	2025	Série A	0	0	1	0	0	0	—		—		1	0
Vasco da Gama	2026	Série A	1	0	0	0	0	0	2 (Note: Appearance(s) in Copa Sudamericana)	0	—		3	0
Career total			1	0	1	0	0	0	2	0	0	0	4	0
