= Lyncon (footballer, born 2005) =

Brazilian footballer (born 2005)

Personal information
- Full name: Lyncon Correa Gonçalves
- Date of birth: 7 May 2005 (age 21)
- Place of birth: Itaboraí, Brazil
- Height: 1.86 m (6 ft 1 in)
- Position: Defender

Team information
- Current team: CRB (on loan from Vasco da Gama)
- Number: 33

Youth career
- Escolinha do Edinho
- 2016–2023: Vasco da Gama

Senior career*
Years	Team	Apps	(Gls)
2023–	Vasco da Gama	4	(1)
2025	→ Volta Redonda (loan)	2	(0)
2026–	→ CRB (loan)	22	(1)
- * Club domestic league appearances and goals as of 17 November 2026

Lyncon Correa Gonçalves (born 7 May 2005) is a Brazilian footballer who plays as a defender for CRB, on loan from Vasco da Gama.

== Early life ==
At nine months old, Lyncon had a near-fatal accident, suffering third degree burns requiring two months of hospitalisation and multiple surgeries. After seeing a psychologist at the age of five, he was encouraged to begin playing sports to take his mind off the accident.

== Club career ==
Lyncon began his footballing career at the Escolinha do Edinho, before joining professional side Vasco da Gama at the age of ten. Two years later, due to the travel difficulties from his hometown, Itaboraí, he moved in with teammate Paulinho. He signed his first professional contract with the club in September 2021.

He made his professional debut with Vasco da Gama on 14 January 2023, coming on as a substitute for Eric Pimentel in a 0–0 Campeonato Carioca draw with Madureira. During the game, he took the ball from his own half, dribbling past three defenders and taking the ball into the box, before his shot was saved by goalkeeper Gerson Dida. The run was compared to Diego Maradona's goal against England at the 1986 FIFA World Cup.

== Career statistics ==
=== Club ===
As of 4 March 2023.

Appearances and goals by club, season and competition
Club	Season	League			State League		Cup		Continental		Other		Total	
Club	Season	Division	Apps	Goals	Apps	Goals	Apps	Goals	Apps	Goals	Apps	Goals	Apps	Goals
Vasco da Gama	2023	Série A	0	0	2 (Note: Appearances in the Campeonato Carioca)	0	0	0	—		0	0	2	0
Career total			0	0	2	0	0	0	0	0	0	0	2	0
