= Adson (footballer, born 2000) =

Brazilian footballer (born 2000)

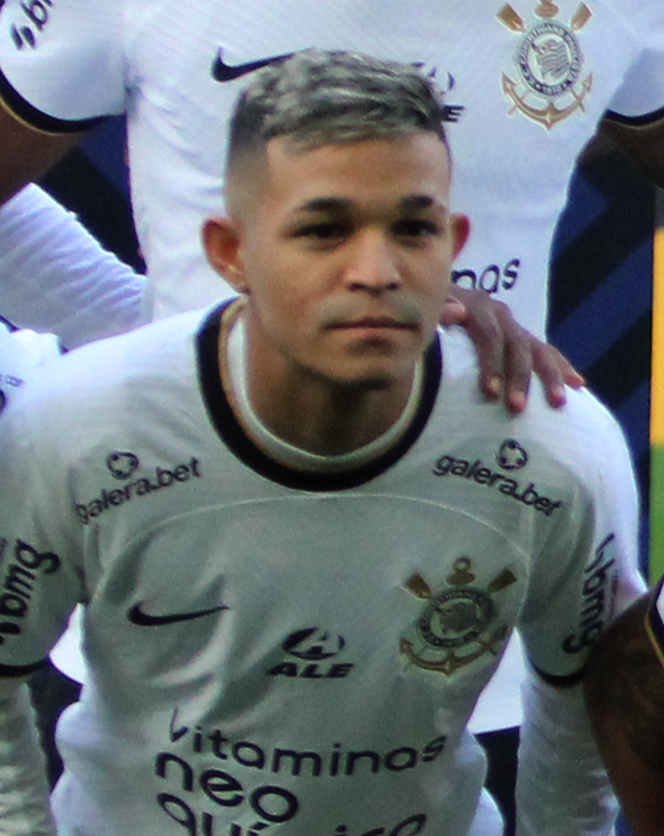
- Adson in 2022

Personal information
- Full name: Adson Ferreira Soares
- Date of birth: 6 October 2000 (age 26)
- Place of birth: Aruanã, Brazil
- Height: 1.71 m (5 ft 7 in)
- Positions: Attacking midfielder; winger

Team information
- Current team: Vasco da Gama
- Number: 28

Youth career
- 2016: Campinas
- 2016: Goiânia
- 2017: Jaraguá
- 2017–2021: Corinthians

Senior career*
Years	Team	Apps	(Gls)
2021–2023	Corinthians	79	(10)
2023	Nantes	8	(0)
2024–	Vasco da Gama	57	(3)
- * Club domestic league appearances and goals as of 12 September 2026

Adson Ferreira Soares (born 6 October 2000), simply known as Adson, is a Brazilian professional footballer who plays as an attacking midfielder or a winger for Vasco da Gama.

== Career ==
=== Corinthians ===
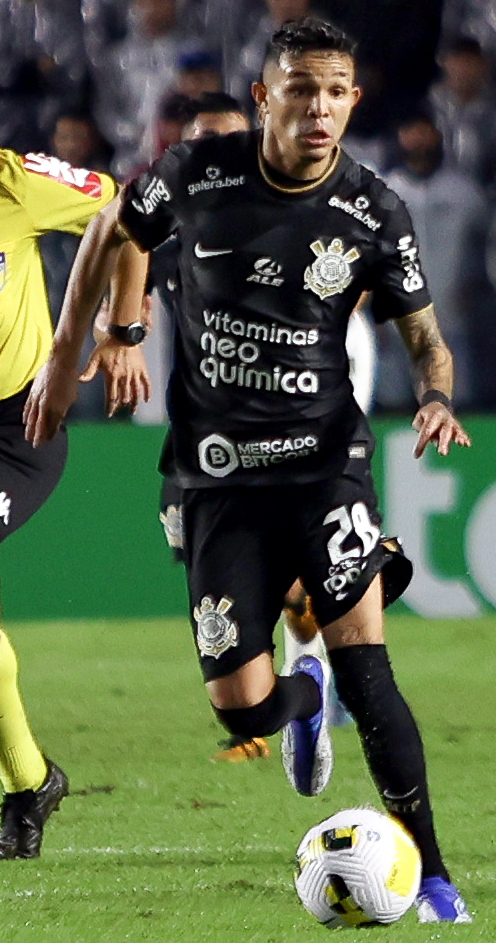
Adson playing for Corinthians in 2022

Born in Aruanã, Goiás, Adson joined Corinthians' youth setup in 2017, from local side Jaraguá. On 10 December 2020, while still a youth, he renewed his contract until 2023.

Adson made his first team debut on 7 March 2021, coming on as a late substitute for Mateus Vital in a 2–1 Campeonato Paulista home win against Ponte Preta. He scored his first professional goal on 26 July, netting his team's second in a 2–1 away success over Cuiabá for the Série A championship.

On 20 January 2023, already established in the first team squad, Adson renewed his contract with Timão until December 2025.

=== Nantes ===
On 23 August 2023, Ligue 1 side Nantes signed Adson on a five-year deal.

=== Vasco da Gama ===
On 24 January 2024, Adson signed a contract with Vasco da Gama until the end of 2027.

== Career statistics ==
As of match played 15 September 2026

Appearances and goals by club, season and competition
Club	Season	League			State League		Cup		Continental		Other		Total	
Club	Season	Division	Apps	Goals	Apps	Goals	Apps	Goals	Apps	Goals	Apps	Goals	Apps	Goals
Corinthians	2021	Série A	16	3	4	0	1	0	3 (Note: Appearance(s) in Copa Sudamericana)	0	—		24	3
Corinthians	2022	Série A	25	3	8	1	10	0	6 (Note: Appearance(s) in Copa Libertadores)	1	—		49	5
Corinthians	2023	Série A	15	0	11	3	7	1	8 (Note: Four appearances and one goal in Copa Libertadores, four appearances in Copa Sudamericana)	1	—		41	5
Corinthians	Total		56	6	23	4	18	1	17	2	0	0	114	12
Nantes	2023–24	Ligue 1	8	0	—		0	0	—		—		8	0
Vasco da Gama	2024	Série A	20	2	8	1	6	1	—		—		34	4
Vasco da Gama	2025	Série A	10	0	0	0	1	0	5	0	—		16	0
Vasco da Gama	2026	Série A	15	0	4	0	6	0	9	4	—		34	4
Total			45	2	12	1	13	1	14	4	0	0	84	8
Career total			109	8	35	5	31	2	31	6	0	0	206	20
