= Mateus Carvalho =

Brazilian footballer (born 2002)

Personal information
- Full name: Mateus Carvalho dos Santos
- Date of birth: 18 March 2002 (age 24)
- Place of birth: Tucuruí, Brazil
- Height: 1.74 m (5 ft 9 in)
- Position: Midfielder

Team information
- Current team: Vasco da Gama
- Number: 85

Youth career
- 2021: VF4
- 2021: Miramar
- 2022: Náutico

Senior career*
Years	Team	Apps	(Gls)
2020–2021	Independente de Tucuruí	22	(1)
2022–2023	Náutico	15	(0)
2023	→ Vasco da Gama (loan)	9	(0)
2024–	Vasco da Gama	70	(2)
- * Club domestic league appearances and goals as of 13 December 2025

Mateus Carvalho dos Santos (born 18 March 2002), known as Mateus Cocão or Mateus Carvalho, is a Brazilian footballer who plays as a midfielder for Vasco da Gama.

== Club career ==
=== Early career ===
Born in Tucuruí, Pará, Mateus Carvalho began his career with hometown side Independente de Tucuruí, being included straight into the first team for the 2020 Série D. In the following year, after playing in the 2021 Campeonato Paraense, he moved to a social project from footballer Victor Ferraz named VF4, and also represented Miramar's youth categories.

=== Náutico ===
Mateus Carvalho moved to Náutico in 2022, initially for the youth categories. He made his first team debut on 10 August of that year, coming on as a late substitute for Jobson in a 2–1 Série B home win over CRB. He played in a further five matches during the season, as his side suffered relegation.

Definitely promoted to the main squad for the 2023 campaign, Mateus Carvalho became a regular starter for Timbu.

=== Vasco da Gama ===
On 14 April 2023, Mateus Carvalho was loaned to Série A side Vasco da Gama for one year, with a buyout clause. After the season ended on November of the same year, Mateus was bought permanently by Vasco for €370,000.

== Career statistics ==
As of 4 March 2024

Club	Season	League			State League		Cup		Continental		Other		Total	
Club	Season	Division	Apps	Goals	Apps	Goals	Apps	Goals	Apps	Goals	Apps	Goals	Apps	Goals
Independente de Tucuruí	2020	Série D	14	1	1	0	—		—		3 (Note: Appearance(s) in Copa Verde)	0	18	1
Independente de Tucuruí	2021	Paraense	—		7	0	—		—		—		7	0
Independente de Tucuruí	Total		14	1	8	0	—		—		3	0	25	1
Náutico	2022	Série B	6	0	—		—		—		—		6	0
Náutico	2023	Série C	0	0	9	0	0	0	—		5 (Note: Appearance(s) in Copa do Nordeste)	0	14	0
Náutico	Total		6	0	9	0	0	0	—		5	0	20	0
Vasco da Gama	2023	Série A	9	0	—		—		—		—		9	0
Vasco da Gama	2024	Série A	0	0	8	0	0	0	—		—		8	1
Vasco da Gama	Total		9	0	8	0	0	0	—		—		17	0
Career total			29	1	25	0	0	0	0	0	8	0	62	2
