= Lucas Freitas =

Brazilian footballer

Personal information
- Full name: Lucas de Freitas Molarinho Chagas
- Date of birth: 20 January 2001 (age 25)
- Place of birth: Rio de Janeiro, Brazil
- Height: 1.84 m (6 ft 0 in)
- Position: Centre-back

Team information
- Current team: Vasco da Gama
- Number: 43

Youth career
- Flamengo
- 2020–2021: Valladolid
- 2021–2022: Palmeiras

Senior career*
Years	Team	Apps	(Gls)
2021	Valladolid B	9	(0)
2021	Valladolid	0	(0)
2021–2024	Palmeiras	3	(0)
2022–2023	→ Moreirense (loan)	4	(0)
2023	→ Chapecoense (loan)	23	(0)
2024	→ Juventude (loan)	19	(0)
2025–	Vasco da Gama	29	(1)
- * Club domestic league appearances and goals as of 8 April 2026

Lucas de Freitas Molarinho Chagas (born 20 January 2001), known as Lucas Freitas, is a Brazilian footballer who plays as a centre-back for Vasco da Gama.

== Career ==
Freitas was born in Rio de Janeiro, and was a youth product of Flamengo. On 28 January 2020, after his contract expired, he moved abroad and signed an 18-month deal with La Liga side Real Valladolid.

After featuring for the Juvenil A side, Freitas first appeared with the main squad on 16 January 2021, coming on as an extra-time substitute for injured Javi Sánchez in a 4–1 away routing of SCR Peña Deportiva, for the season's Copa del Rey. He subsequently featured with the reserves in Segunda División B, before leaving the club in July after his contract ended.

On 6 August 2021, Freitas returned to his home country after signing for Palmeiras, being initially a member of the under-20 team. He made his first team – and Série A – debut on 30 November, replacing Gustavo Garcia in a 3–1 away win over Cuiabá.

On 31 August 2022, after finishing his formation, Freitas was loaned to Liga Portugal 2 side Moreirense for one year. He was rarely used as the club achieved promotion as champions, and moved to Série B side Chapecoense also in a temporary deal on 30 June 2023.

A regular starter at Chape, Freitas joined Juventude on loan for the 2024 season on 31 December 2023.

== Personal life ==
Lucas Freitas is twin brother of the also professional footballer Luan Freitas.

== Career statistics ==
As of 2 January 2024

Club	Season	League			State League		Cup		Continental		Other		Total	
Club	Season	Division	Apps	Goals	Apps	Goals	Apps	Goals	Apps	Goals	Apps	Goals	Apps	Goals
Valladolid B	2020–21	Segunda División B	9	1	—		—		—		—		9	1
Valladolid	2020–21	La Liga	0	0	—		1	0	—		—		1	0
Palmeiras	2021	Série A	3	0	—		—		—		—		3	0
Palmeiras	2022	Série A	0	0	0	0	0	0	0	0	0	0	0	0
Palmeiras	Total		3	0	0	0	0	0	0	0	0	0	3	0
Moreirense (loan)	2022–23	Liga Portugal 2	4	0	—		2	1	—		2 (Note: Appearance(s) in Taça da Liga)	0	8	1
Chapecoense (loan)	2023	Série B	23	0	—		—		—		—		23	0
Juventude (loan)	2024	Série A	0	0	0	0	0	0	—		—		0	0
Career total			39	1	0	0	3	1	0	0	2	0	44	2

== Honours ==
Palmeiras

- Copa São Paulo de Futebol Júnior: 2022
- Campeonato Paulista: 2022

Moreirense

- Liga Portugal 2: 2022–23
