= Alexander (footballer, born 1999) =

Brazilian footballer

Personal information
- Full name: Alexander Silva de Lucena
- Date of birth: 31 May 1999 (age 27)
- Place of birth: São Gonçalo, Rio de Janeiro, Brazil
- Height: 1.90 m (6 ft 3 in)
- Position: Goalkeeper

Team information
- Current team: Bangu (on loan from Vasco da Gama)

Youth career
- –2019: Vasco da Gama

Senior career*
| Years | Team | Apps | (Gls) |
| 2019– | Vasco da Gama | 3 | (0) |
| 2023 | → Avaí (loan) | 10 | (0) |
| 2024–2024 | → Ypiranga (loan) | 22 | (0) |
- * Club domestic league appearances and goals as of 31 December 2024

Alexander Silva de Lucena (born 31 May 1999), commonly known as Alexander, is a Brazilian footballer who plays as a goalkeeper for Bangu, on loan from Vasco da Gama.

== Career statistics ==
=== Club ===
As of 25 January 2022.

| Club | Season | League | | | State League | | Cup | | Continental | | Other | | Total | |
| Club | Season | Division | Apps | Goals | Apps | Goals | Apps | Goals | Apps | Goals | Apps | Goals | Apps | Goals |
|---|---|---|---|---|---|---|---|---|---|---|---|---|---|---|
| Vasco da Gama | 2019 | Série A | 2 | 0 | 0 | 0 | 1 (Note: Appearances in the Copa do Brasil) | 0 | 0 | 0 | 0 | 0 | 3 | 0 |
| Vasco da Gama | 2020 | Série A | 0 | 0 | 0 | 0 | 0 | 0 | 0 | 0 | 0 | 0 | 0 | 0 |
| Vasco da Gama | 2021 | Série B | 0 | 0 | 0 | 0 | 0 | 0 | – | | 0 | 0 | 0 | 0 |
| Vasco da Gama | 2022 | Série B | 0 | 0 | 0 | 0 | 0 | 0 | – | | 0 | 0 | 0 | 0 |
| Career total | | | 2 | 0 | 0 | 0 | 1 | 0 | 0 | 0 | 0 | 0 | 3 | 0 |
