= GB (footballer) =

Brazilian footballer (born 2005)

Personal information
- Full name: Gabriel Souza da Silva
- Date of birth: 5 January 2005 (age 21)
- Place of birth: Rio de Janeiro, Brazil
- Height: 1.90 m (6 ft 3 in)
- Position: Forward

Team information
- Current team: Chaves (on loan from Vasco da Gama)

Youth career
- River de Piedade
- 2014–2023: Vasco da Gama

Senior career*
Years	Team	Apps	(Gls)
2023–	Vasco da Gama	22	(3)
2026	→ Fortaleza (loan)	1	(0)
2026–	→ Chaves (loan)	0	(0)
- * Club domestic league appearances and goals as of 13 December 2025

Gabriel Souza da Silva (born 5 January 2005), known as Gabriel or simply GB, is a Brazilian footballer who plays as a forward for Chaves, on loan from Vasco da Gama.

== Club career ==
=== Early career ===
Born in Rio de Janeiro, GB started playing futsal with local side River de Piedade, before being spotted by professional team Vasco da Gama, having played in a game against them. He joined Vasco da Gama at the age of nine, and progressed through their academy, signing a professional contract in 2021.

=== Vasco da Gama ===
On 19 January 2023, he made his professional debut with the team in a 79th substitute Campeonato Carioca match against Audax-RJ. On 28 July 2024, he made his Série A debut against Grêmio in a 71st minute substitute. Just six days later, on 3 August 2024, he scored his first professional goal against Red Bull Bragantino in 21st day of 2024 Campeonato Brasileiro Série A.

== Career statistics ==
=== Club ===
As of 16 January 2025.

Appearances and goals by club, season and competition
Club	Season	League			State League		National Cup (Note: Includes Copa do Brasil)		Continental		Other		Total	
Club	Season	Division	Apps	Goals	Apps	Goals	Apps	Goals	Apps	Goals	Apps	Goals	Apps	Goals
Vasco da Gama	2023	Série A	0	0	2 (Note: Appearances in the Campeonato Carioca)	0	0	0	—		3 (Note: Appearances in the Copinha)	3	5	3
Vasco da Gama	2024	Série A	2	1	0	0	2	0	—		0	0	4	1
Vasco da Gama	2025	Série A	0	0	2	0	0	0	—		0	0	2	0
Vasco da Gama	Total		2	1	4	0	2	0	0	0	3	3	11	4
Career total			2	1	4	0	2	0	0	0	3	3	11	4
