= Guilherme Estrella =

Brazilian footballer

Personal information
- Full name: Guilherme Estrella de Paiva
- Date of birth: 6 January 2005 (age 21)
- Place of birth: Rio de Janeiro, Brazil
- Height: 1.85 m (6 ft 1 in)
- Position: Midfielder

Team information
- Current team: CRB (on loan from Vasco da Gama)

Youth career
- 2015–2024: Vasco da Gama

Senior career*
| Years | Team | Apps | (Gls) |
| 2024– | Vasco da Gama | 7 | (1) |
| 2026– | → CRB (loan) | 6 | (0) |
- * Club domestic league appearances and goals as of 17 November 2026

Guilherme Estrella de Paiva (born 6 January 2005), known as Guilherme Estrella or just Estrella, is a Brazilian professional footballer who plays as a midfielder for CRB on loan from Vasco da Gama.

== Career ==
Born in Rio de Janeiro, Estrella joined Vasco da Gama's youth sides in 2015, aged ten. On 3 January 2024, he renewed his contract with the club until 2026.

Estrella made his first team debut on 18 January 2024, coming on as a second-half substitute for fellow youth graduate Rodrigo in a 2–0 Campeonato Carioca home win over Boavista. He made his Série A debut on 22 June, starting and scoring his team's second in a 4–1 home routing of São Paulo.

== Career statistics ==
As of 9 February 2026

Appearances and goals by club, season and competition
| Club | Season | League | | | State League | | National Cup | | Continental | | Other | | Total | |
| Club | Season | Division | Apps | Goals | Apps | Goals | Apps | Goals | Apps | Goals | Apps | Goals | Apps | Goals |
|---|---|---|---|---|---|---|---|---|---|---|---|---|---|---|
| Vasco da Gama | 2024 | Série A | 3 | 1 | 2 | 0 | 0 | 0 | — | | — | | 5 | 1 |
| Vasco da Gama | 2025 | Série A | 1 | 0 | 0 | 0 | 1 | 0 | 1 (Note: Appearance(s) in Copa Sudamericana) | 0 | — | | 3 | 0 |
| Vasco da Gama | 2026 | Série A | 0 | 0 | 1 | 0 | 0 | 0 | 0 | 0 | — | | 1 | 0 |
| Career total | | | 4 | 1 | 3 | 0 | 1 | 0 | 1 | 0 | 0 | 0 | 9 | 1 |
