= Riquelme (footballer, born April 2002) =

Brazilian footballer

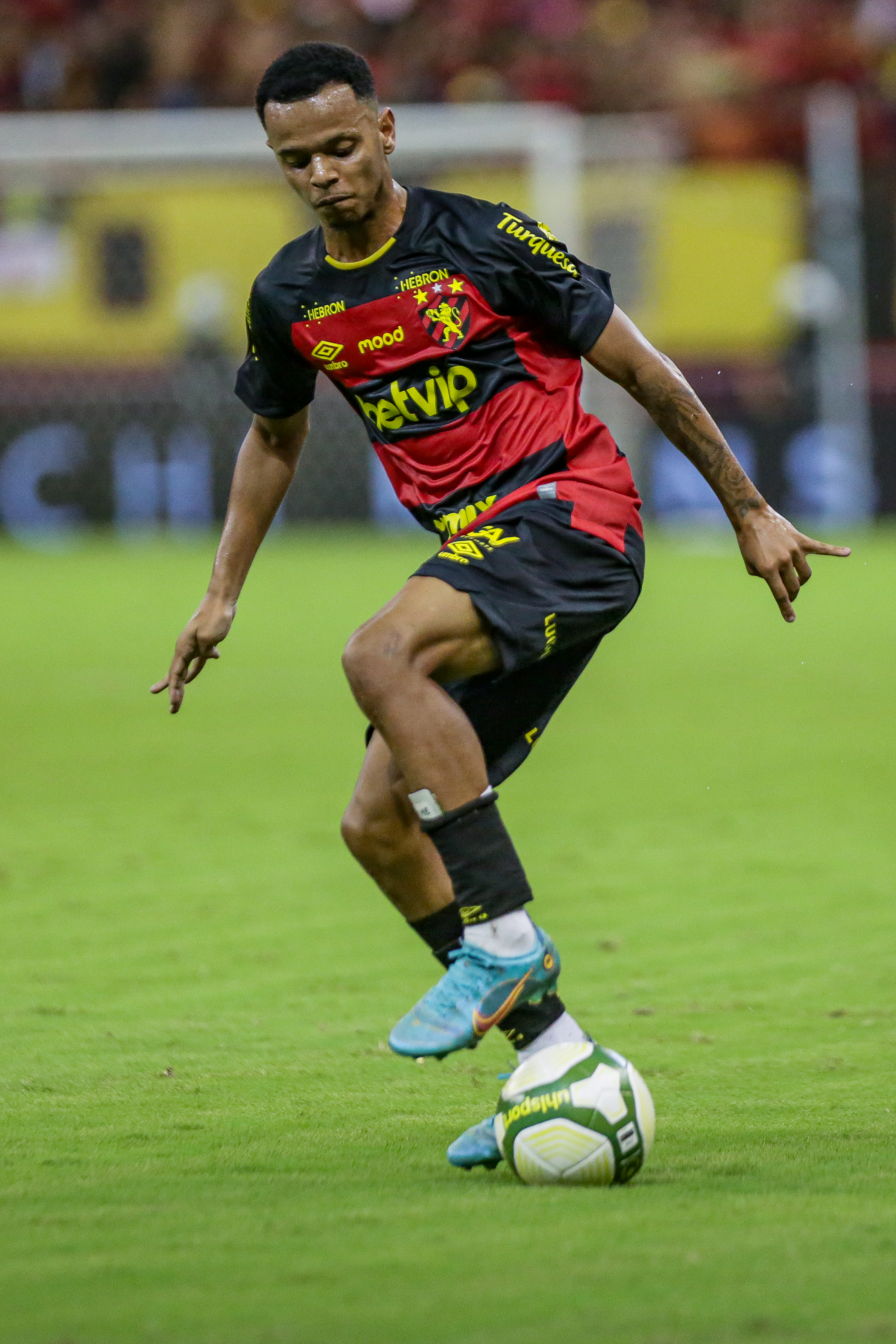
- Riquelme playing for Sport Recife in 2024

Personal information
- Full name: Riquelme Carvalho Araújo Viana
- Date of birth: 28 August 2002 (age 24)
- Place of birth: Barra Mansa, Brazil
- Height: 1.73 m (5 ft 8 in)
- Position: Left-back

Team information
- Current team: Panserraikos (on loan from Vasco da Gama)
- Number: 12

Youth career
- –2021: Vasco da Gama

Senior career*
Years	Team	Apps	(Gls)
2021–	Vasco da Gama	36	(0)
2024	→ Sport Recife (loan)	13	(0)
2026–	→ Panserraikos (loan)	0	(0)
- * Club domestic league appearances and goals as of 13 December 2025

Riquelme Carvalho Araújo Viana (born 28 April 2002), better known as just Riquelme, is a Brazilian professional footballer who plays as a left-back for Panserraikos, on loan from Vasco da Gama.
