= Rodrigo (footballer, born 2002) =

Brazilian footballer (born 2002)

Personal information
- Full name: Rodrigo Alves de Holanda Santos
- Date of birth: 4 June 2002 (age 24)
- Place of birth: Barra de São Miguel, Brazil
- Height: 1.76 m (5 ft 9 in)
- Position: Defensive midfielder

Team information
- Current team: Nacional-AM

Youth career
- Projeto Barrinha
- Agrimaq
- Vasco da Gama

Senior career*
Years	Team	Apps	(Gls)
2023–2024	Vasco da Gama	20	(0)
2023	→ Londrina (loan)	16	(0)
2024–2025	Bandırmaspor	5	(0)
2026–	Nacional-AM	0	(0)
- * Club domestic league appearances and goals as of 9 February 2025

Rodrigo Alves de Holanda Santos (born 4 June 2002) is a Brazilian professional footballer who plays as a defensive midfielder for Nacional-AM.

== Club career ==
Born in Barra de São Miguel, Alagoas, Rodrigo hails from a family of footballers, with his brother, Jean, and a number of cousins pursuing careers in the sport. He started his own career with local sides Projeto Barrinha and Agrimaq, the latter of which had a partnership with professional club Vasco da Gama. Having briefly attended a school in Maceió on a scholarship, he joined Vasco da Gama at the age of thirteen.

In his first start for the club, in a 5–0 Campeonato Carioca win over Resende, he impressed with his performance in midfield, having been played out of position as right-back in previous games.

== Career statistics ==
As of match played 22 December 2024.

Appearances and goals by club, season and competition
Club	Season	League			State league		National cup (Note: Includes Copa do Brasil, Turkish Cup)		Continental		Other		Total	
Club	Season	Division	Apps	Goals	Apps	Goals	Apps	Goals	Apps	Goals	Apps	Goals	Apps	Goals
Vasco da Gama	2023	Série A	8	0	10 (Note: Appearances in the Campeonato Carioca)	0	2	0	—		0	0	20	0
Vasco da Gama	2024	Série A	0	0	2	0	0	0	—		0	0	2	0
Vasco da Gama	Total		8	0	12	0	2	0	0	0	0	0	22	0
Londrina (loan)	2023	Série B	16	0	0	0	0	0	—		0	0	16	0
Bandırmaspor	2024–25	TFF 1. Lig	5	0	—		1	0	—		0	0	6	0
Career total			29	0	12	0	3	0	0	0	0	0	44	0
