= José Luis Rodríguez (footballer, born 1997) =

Uruguayan footballer

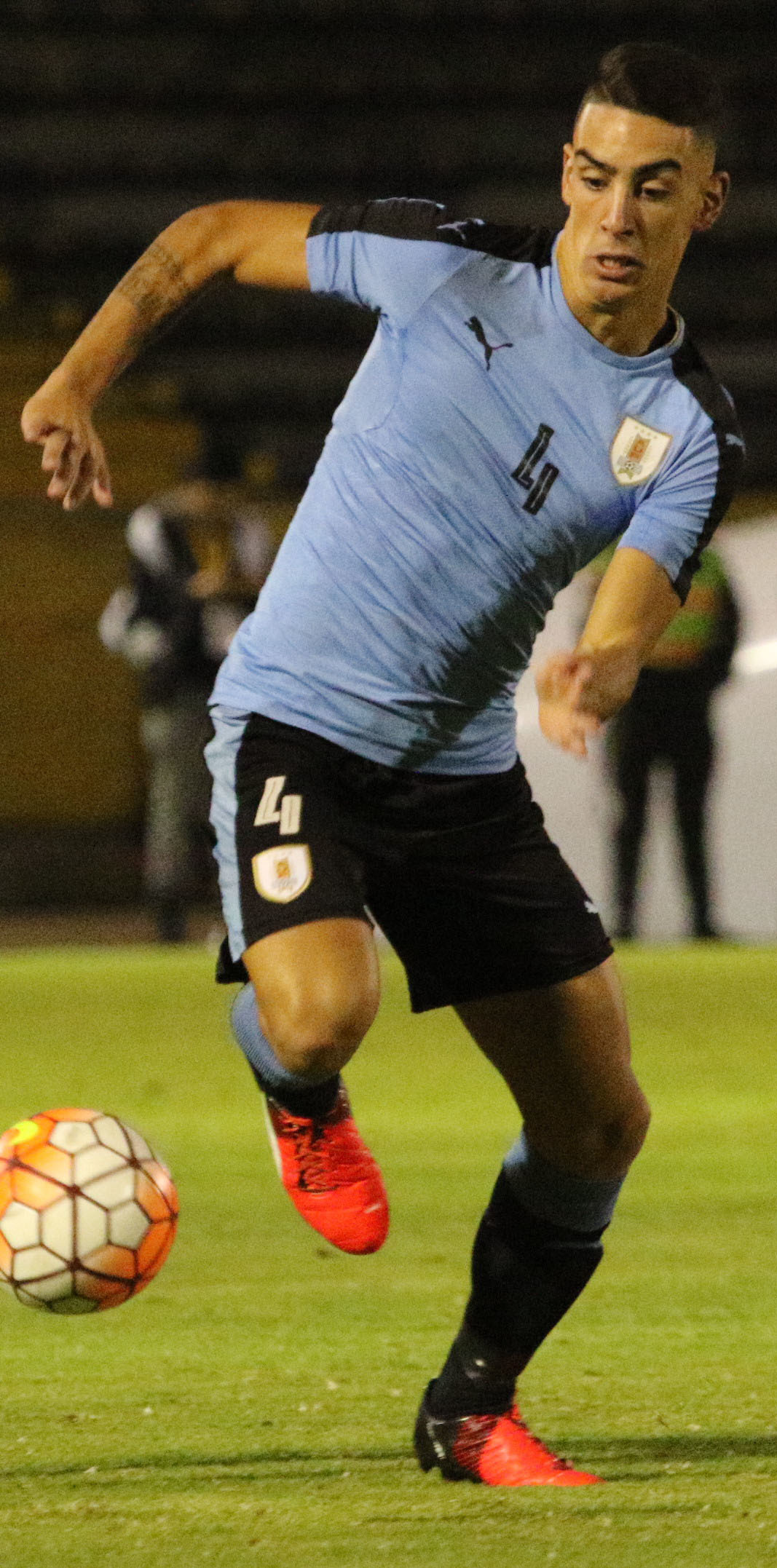
- Rodríguez in 2017

Personal information
- Full name: José Luis Rodríguez Bebanz
- Date of birth: 14 March 1997 (age 29)
- Place of birth: Canelones, Uruguay
- Height: 1.83 m (6 ft 0 in)
- Positions: Right-back; left-back; right winger

Team information
- Current team: Vasco da Gama
- Number: 2

Youth career
- Danubio

Senior career*
Years	Team	Apps	(Gls)
2016–2021	Danubio	104	(6)
2019–2020	→ Racing Club (loan)	1	(0)
2021	Fénix	14	(2)
2022	Nacional	32	(2)
2023–	Vasco da Gama	117	(10)

International career^{‡}
2016–2017	Uruguay U20	29	(2)
2020	Uruguay U23	9	(2)
2023–	Uruguay	5	(0)
Medal record
Men's football
Representing Uruguay
South American U-20 Championship
Winner	2017 Ecuador
- * Club domestic league appearances and goals as of 8 April 2026 ‡ National team caps and goals as of 13 October 2025

José Luis Rodríguez Bebanz (born 14 March 1997), also known as Puma Rodríguez or Pumita, is a Uruguayan professional footballer who plays primarily as a right-back for Campeonato Brasileiro Série A club Vasco da Gama and the Uruguay national team.

== Club career ==
On 4 January 2023, Vasco da Gama signed Rodríguez a three-year contract until 31 December 2025. On 29 December 2025, he signed a two-year contract extension, with an option for a further year.

== International career ==
Rodríguez is a former Uruguayan youth international.

On 21 October 2022, he was named in Uruguay's 55-man preliminary squad for the 2022 FIFA World Cup. Later he made the 26-men cut to the World Cup squad, although he didn't make a single appearance in the competition.

== Personal life ==
Rodríguez is nicknamed Puma after Venezuelan singer José Luis Rodríguez, who is known by the nickname El Puma.

== Career statistics ==
=== Club ===
As of 5 January 2024

Club	Season	League			Cup		Continental		Other		Total	
Club	Season	Division	Apps	Goals	Apps	Goals	Apps	Goals	Apps	Goals	Apps	Goals
Danubio	2015–16	Uruguayan Primera División	5	0	—		—		—		5	0
Danubio	2016	Uruguayan Primera División	6	2	—		—		—		6	2
Danubio	2017	Uruguayan Primera División	18	1	—		0	0	—		18	1
Danubio	2018	Uruguayan Primera División	25	0	—		2 (Note: Appearance(s) in Copa Sudamericana.)	1	—		27	1
Danubio	2019	Uruguayan Primera División	8	1	—		—		—		8	1
Danubio	2020	Uruguayan Primera División	31	2	—		—		—		31	2
Danubio	2021	Uruguayan Segunda División	11	1	—		—		—		11	1
Danubio	Total		104	7	0	0	2	1	0	0	106	8
Racing Club (loan)	2019–20	Argentine Primera División	1	0	—		—		—		1	0
Fénix	2021	Uruguayan Primera División	14	2	—		—		—		14	2
Nacional	2022	Uruguayan Primera División	34	2	—		9 (Note: Six appearances in Copa Libertadores, three appearances and one goal in Copa Sudamericana.)	1	—		43	3
Vasco da Gama	2023	Série A	32	2	0	0	—		0	0	32	2
Career total			185	13	0	0	11	2	0	0	166	15

=== International ===
As of match played 13 October 2025

Appearances and goals by national team and year
National team	Year	Apps	Goals
Uruguay	2023	2	0
Uruguay	2024	1	0
Uruguay	2025	2	0
Uruguay	2026	0	0
Total		5	0

== Honours ==
Nacional

- Uruguayan Primera División: 2022

Individual

- Uruguayan Primera División Team of the Year: 2022
