= Clube de Regatas Brasil =

Brazilian professional football club

CRB
- Full name: Clube de Regatas Brasil
- Nicknames: Galo (de Campina) (Red-cowled Cardinal); Galo da Praia (Cardinal of the Beach)
- Founded: 20 September 1912; 114 years ago
- Ground: Rei Pelé
- Capacity: 19,105
- President: Mário Marroquim
- Head coach: Eduardo Barroca
- League: Campeonato Brasileiro Série B Campeonato Alagoano
- 2025 2025: Série B, 8th of 20; Alagoano, 1st of 8 (champions)
- Website: www.crb.esp.br
Home colors	Away colors

Clube de Regatas Brasil, commonly referred to as CRB, is a Brazilian professional football club based in Maceió, Alagoas. It competes in the Série B, the second tier of Brazilian football, as well as in the Campeonato Alagoano, the top flight of the Alagoas state football league.

Founded on 20 September 1912, it plays in white and red shirts, shorts and socks. Its greatest rival is Centro Sportivo Alagoano (CSA),

== History ==
The club was founded on 20 September 1912 by Lafaiete Pacheco, former member of Clube Alagoano de Regatas. He was dissatisfied with the precarious conditions of his former club. Aroldo Cardoso Zagallo, father of Mário Jorge Lobo Zagallo, worked at the club in 1913 as the football department boss.

Four years later, in 1916, CRB bought an estate in Pajuçara neighborhood and built its football field where is now Severiano Gomes Stadium.

== Rivalries ==
CRB's greatest rival is CSA.

On 1 October 1939, CRB beat CSA 6–0, in what was the biggest win in the rivalry's history. The game was known as "Jogo da Sofia" (Sofia's game), which is a reference to a goat named Sofia and owned by CRB's forward Arlindo, as the goat is the number six animal in Jogo do Bicho.

Numbers of the derby

- Games: 474
- CRB wins: 171
- Draws: 156
- CSA wins: 148
- CRB goals: 579
- CSA goals: 606

== Stadium ==
The club plays at Estádio Rei Pelé, which has a maximum capacity of 19,105 people and is named after Pelé.

== Honours ==
=== Official tournaments ===
State
Competitions	Titles	Seasons
Campeonato Alagoano	36	1927, 1930, 1937, 1938, 1939, 1940, 1950, 1951, 1961, 1964, 1969, 1970, 1972, 1973, 1976, 1977, 1978, 1979, 1983, 1986, 1987, 1992, 1993, 1995, 2002, 2012, 2013, 2015, 2016, 2017, 2020, 2022, 2023, 2024, 2025, 2026

=== Others tournaments ===
==== Regional ====
- Torneio José Américo de Almeida Filho (1): 1975

==== State ====
- Copa Maceió (1): 2015
- Torneio Início de Alagoas (15): 1936, 1937, 1939, 1943, 1944, 1945, 1946, 1951, 1956, 1958, 1962, 1963, 1966, 1969, 1970

=== Runners-up ===
- Campeonato Brasileiro Série C (1): 2011
- Copa do Nordeste (2): 1994, 2024
- Campeonato Alagoano (28): 1928, 1941, 1942, 1944, 1946, 1948, 1949, 1958, 1959, 1963, 1968, 1971, 1974, 1975, 1980, 1981, 1982, 1984, 1985, 1994, 1996, 1997, 1998, 2003, 2014, 2018, 2019, 2021

=== Women's Football ===
- Campeonato Alagoano de Futebol Feminino (1): 2021

== Current squad ==
As of 30 October 2026

Note: Flags indicate national team as defined under FIFA eligibility rules; some limited exceptions apply. Players may hold more than one non-FIFA nationality.

No.	Pos.	Nation	Player
1	GK	BRA	Vitor Caetano
2	DF	BRA	Kevin (on loan from Primavera)
6	DF	BRA	Reverson
7	FW	BRA	Douglas Baggio
8	MF	BRA	Crystopher (on loan from Boavista)
9	FW	BRA	João Neto (on loan from Fluminense)
10	MF	BRA	Danielzinho
11	FW	BRA	Guilherme Pato
12	GK	BRA	Matheus Albino
14	MF	BRA	Guilherme Estrella (on loan from Vasco da Gama)
17	FW	BRA	Thiaguinho
18	MF	BRA	Geovane (on loan from Epitsentr)
19	FW	BRA	Luiz Phellype
20	FW	BRA	Vinícius Nunes
21	MF	BRA	Pedro Castro
22	DF	BRA	Bressan
23	GK	BRA	Fábio Henrique

No.	Pos.	Nation	Player
26	MF	BRA	Estêvão
27	DF	BRA	Fábio Alemão (captain)
28	FW	BRA	Mikael
31	DF	BRA	Ruy
32	DF	BRA	Hereda
33	DF	BRA	Lyncon (on loan from Vasco da Gama)
36	DF	BRA	Lucas Lovat
44	DF	BRA	Henri
45	MF	BRA	Patrick de Lucca
50	MF	BRA	Luizão
60	DF	BRA	Maycon
77	DF	BRA	Léo Campos
95	FW	BRA	Ygor Catatau (on loan from Volta Redonda)
97	FW	BRA	Dadá Belmonte
99	FW	BRA	Saymom
—	GK	BRA	Cândido
—	MF	BRA	Anderson Dias

=== Out on loan ===
Note: Flags indicate national team as defined under FIFA eligibility rules; some limited exceptions apply. Players may hold more than one non-FIFA nationality.

No.	Pos.	Nation	Player
—	GK	BRA	Pablo (at Sporting FC until 31 May 2026)
—	DF	BRA	Darlisson (at Anápolis until 30 November 2026)
—	DF	BRA	Mateus Pureza (at São José-RS until 30 September 2026)

No.	Pos.	Nation	Player
—	MF	BRA	Lucas Kallyel (at Anápolis until 30 November 2026)
—	MF	BRA	Rodriguinho (at Anápolis until 30 November 2026)
—	FW	BRA	Breno Herculano (at Anyang until 31 December 2026)

== All presidents in club history ==
=== 1910s and 1920s ===
- (Brazil) Luís Toledo Pizza Sobrinho (1912–13)
- (Brazil) João Viana de Souza (1913–14)
- (Brazil) Casimiro Movilha (1914–15)
- (Brazil) Homero Viegas (1915–17)
- (Brazil) Pedro Lima (1917–18)
- (Brazil) Ismael Acioli (1918–20)
- (Brazil) Raul Brito (1920–25)
- (Brazil) Pedro Oliveira Rocha (1925–26)
- (Brazil) Armando Melo (1926–27) (1927 – 1st title)
- (Brazil) Pedro Lima (1927–28)
- (Brazil) Juvêncio Lessa (1928–29)
- (Brazil) Pedro Oliveira Rocha (1929–30) (1930 – 2nd title)

=== 1930s and 1940s ===
- (Brazil) Raul Brito (1930–31)
- (Brazil) Ismael Acioli (1931–32)
- (Brazil) Dalmário Souza (1931–32)
- (Brazil) Emílio de Maya (1933–34)
- (Brazil) Pedro Claudino Duarte (1934–36)
- (Brazil) Fábio Araújo (1936–39)
- (Brazil) Mauro Paiva (1937–39) (1937 – 3rd title / 1938 – 4th title)
- (Brazil) Mário Gomes de Barros (1939–40) (1939 – 5th title)
- (Brazil) Rui Palmeira (1940–41) (1940 – 6th title)
- (Brazil) Jaques de Azevedo (1941–42)
- (Brazil) Mauro Paiva (1942–43)
- (Brazil) Aristides Torres (1943–44)
- (Brazil) Paulo de Miranda Neto (1944–45)
- (Brazil) Mauro Paiva (1945–47)
- (Brazil) Gal. Mário de Carvalho Lima (1947–48)
- (Brazil) Ulisses Marinho (1948–54) (1950 – 7th title / 1951 – 8th title)

=== 1950s and 1960s ===
- (Brazil) Ulisses Marinho (1948–54) (1950 – 7th title / 1951 – 8th title)
- (Brazil) Luís Duda Calado (1954–55)
- (Brazil) Djalma Loureiro (1955–56)
- (Brazil) Roberto Castro (1956–57)
- (Brazil) Aluizio Freitas Melro (1956–57)
- (Brazil) Severiano Gomes Filho (1958–62) (1961 – 9th title)
- (Brazil) Oswaldo Gomes de Barros (1962–66) (1964 – 10th title)
- (Brazil) Severiano Gomes Filho (1966–67)
- (Brazil) Walter Pitombo Laranjeiras (1967–68)
- (Brazil) Divaldo Cavalcante Suruagy (1968–69)
- (Brazil) Naftalli Edgar Setton (1969–70) (1969 – 11th title)

=== 1970s and 1980s ===
- (Brazil) Oswaldo Gomes de Barros (1970–71) (1970 – 12th title)
- (Brazil) Luiz Renato de Paiva Lima (1971–73) (1972 – 13th title / 1973 – 14th title)
- (Brazil) Cláudio Regis (1973–74)
- (Portugal) Fernando Azevedo D’Aldeia (1974–75)
- (Brazil) Luiz Gonzaga Mendes de Barros (1975–76)
- (Brazil) José Santana de Melo (1976–77) (1976 – 15th title)
- (Brazil) Afrânio Lages Filho (1977–79) (1977 – 16th title / 1978 – 17th title / 1979 – 18th title)
- (Brazil) José Otávio Moreira Filho (1979–82)
- (Brazil) Oswaldo Gomes de Barros (1982–84) (1983 – 19th title)
- (Brazil) José de Medeiros Tavares (1984–85)
- (Brazil) Waldemar Correia da Silva (1985–87) (1985 – 20th title / 1986 – 21st title)
- (Brazil) Carlos Alberto Fernande Antunes (1987–88)
- (Brazil) José Luiz Malta Argolo (1988–89)
- (Brazil) Walter Pitombo Laranjeiras (1989–90)

=== 1990s and 2000s ===
- (Brazil) Paulo Roberto Magalhães Nunes (1990–91)
- (Brazil) Manoel Gomes de Barros (1991–92) (1992 – 22nd title)
- (Brazil) José Marcelo de Medeiros Rocha (1992–93)
- (Brazil) Waldemar Correia da Silva (1993–94) (1993 – 23rd title)
- (Brazil) Flávio Gomes de Barros (1994–95) (1995 – 24th title)
- (Brazil) Walter Pitombo Laranjeiras (1995–98)
- (Brazil) Wilton Antonio Figueiroa Lima (1998–99), (2007–08)
- (Brazil) José Cabral da Rocha Barros (1999–04), (2006) (2002 – 25th title)
- (Brazil) Celso Luiz Tenório Brandão (2004–06)
- (Brazil) Wilton Antônio Figueiroa Lima (2007–08)
- (Brazil) José Serafim da Silva Filho (2009–10)

=== 2010s and 2020s ===
- (Brazil) Marcos Antônio de Oliveira Barbosa (2011–21)
- (Brazil) Mário Marroquim (2021–)
