= Paulinho (footballer, born 23 May 2005) =

Brazilian footballer (born 2005)

Personal information
- Full name: Paulo Ricardo de Souza Babilônia
- Date of birth: 23 May 2005 (age 21)
- Place of birth: Tefé, Brazil
- Height: 1.75 m (5 ft 9 in)
- Position: Right-back

Team information
- Current team: Fortaleza

Youth career
- 2014–2023: Vasco da Gama

Senior career*
Years	Team	Apps	(Gls)
2023–2026	Vasco da Gama	9	(1)
2026–	Fortaleza	0	(0)
Medal record
Men's football
Representing Brazil
South American U-20 Championship
Winner	2025 Venezuela
- * Club domestic league appearances and goals as of 13 December 2025

Paulo Ricardo de Souza Babilônia (born 23 May 2005), known as Paulinho, is a Brazilian footballer who plays as a right-back for Fortaleza.

== Club career ==
Born in Tefé, Amazonas, Paulinho began his career with Vasco da Gama in 2014, at the age of eight, having successfully trialled with the club. He signed his first professional contract with the club in 2021, before going on to make his unofficial debut in a 3–0 friendly win against American side Inter Miami, as part of Vasco da Gama's 2023 pre-season.

== Honours ==
Brazil U20

- South American U-20 Championship: 2025

== Career statistics ==
=== Club ===
As of 4 March 2023.

Appearances and goals by club, season and competition
Club	Season	League			State League		Cup		Continental		Other		Total	
Club	Season	Division	Apps	Goals	Apps	Goals	Apps	Goals	Apps	Goals	Apps	Goals	Apps	Goals
Vasco da Gama	2023	Série A	0	0	1 (Note: Appearances in the Campeonato Carioca)	0	1 (Note: Appearances in the Copa do Brasil)	0	—		0	0	2	0
Career total			0	0	1	0	1	0	0	0	0	0	2	0
