= Reverson (Brazilian footballer) =

Brazilian footballer

Personal information
- Full name: Reverson Valuarth Paiva Silva
- Date of birth: 2 February 1997 (age 29)
- Place of birth: Araguaína, Brazil
- Height: 1.75 m (5 ft 9 in)
- Position: Left-back

Team information
- Current team: CRB
- Number: 6

Youth career
- 2012–2013: Flamengo
- 2014–2017: Novorizontino
- 2015–2016: → Coritiba (loan)
- 2017: → Internacional (loan)

Senior career*
Years	Team	Apps	(Gls)
2018–2025	Novorizontino	147	(5)
2019	→ Mirassol (loan)	18	(0)
2025	Paysandu	34	(2)
2026–	CRB	18	(0)
- * Club domestic league appearances and goals as of 16 November 2026

Reverson Valuarth Paiva Silva (born 2 February 1997), simply known as Reverson, is a Brazilian professional footballer who plays as a left-back for Campeonato Brasileiro Série B club CRB.

== Career ==
Born in Araguaína, Tocantins, Reverson played for Flamengo's youth teams in 2012 and 2013, until arriving at Grêmio Novorizontino, a team where he has been since 2014. He was loaned out as a youth player to Coritiba and Internacional, and as professional level to Mirassol in the 2019 season. He has currently made more than 140 appearances for the Novo Horizonte city club. In March 2025, Reverson was announced by Paysandu.

== Career statistics ==
Appearances and goals by club, season and competition
Club	Season	League			State league		Copa do Brasil		Other		Total	
Club	Season	Division	Apps	Goals	Apps	Goals	Apps	Goals	Apps	Goals	Apps	Goals
Novorizontino	2018	Série D	10	0	3 (Note: Appearance(s) in Campeonato Paulista Série A1)	0	—		13 (Note: Appearance(s) in Copa Paulista)	1	26	1
Novorizontino	2019	Série D	2	0	1	0	—		—		3	0
Novorizontino	2020	Série D	11	0	3	0	0	0	3	1	17	1
Novorizontino	2021	Série C	23	2	5	0	—		—		28	2
Novorizontino	2022	Série B	7	0	12	0	1	0	—		20	0
Novorizontino	2023	Série B	30	1	9 (Note: Appearance(s) in Campeonato Paulista Série A2)	1	—		—		39	2
Novorizontino	2024	Série B	32	1	12	0	—		—		44	1
Novorizontino	2025	Série B	0	0	0	0	0	0	—		0	0
Novorizontino	Total		115	4	45	1	1	0	16	2	177	7
Mirassol (loan)	2019	—			0	0	—		18	0	18	0
Career total			115	4	45	1	1	0	34	2	195	7
