= 2024 CR Vasco da Gama season =

Vasco da Gama
2024 season
- SAF owner: 777 Partners (70%) (until 15 May)
- Chairman: Pedrinho
- Manager: Ramón Díaz (until 28 April); Álvaro Pacheco (21 May–20 June); Rafael Paiva (21 June–24 November); Felipe Loureiro (interim; 24 November–19 December); Fábio Carille (from 19 December)
- Stadium: São Januário
- Série A: 10th
- Campeonato Carioca: Semi-finals
- Copa do Brasil: Semifinal
- Top goalscorer: League: Pablo Vegetti (6); All: Pablo Vegetti (13)
- Average home league attendance: 21,357
- Biggest win: Vasco 4–1 São Paulo
- Biggest defeat: Vasco 1–6 Flamengo
Home colours	Away colours	Third colours

The 2024 season was the second consecutive season for Club de Regatas Vasco da Gama in the Brazilian Premier Division and the 126th season since its founding.

== Transfers ==
=== In ===
Pos.	Player	Transferred from	Fee	Date	Source
MF	(Chile) Pablo Galdames	(Italy) Genoa	Undisclosed	5 February 2024	
MF	(Argentina) Juan Sforza	(Argentina) Newell's Old Boys	$5,000,000	19 February 2024	
FW	(Brazil) Clayton	(Portugal) Casa Pia	€3,500,000	7 March 2024	
MF	(Brazil) Hugo Moura	(Brazil) Athletico Paranaense	Loan	18 April 2024	
MF	(Brazil) Philippe Coutinho	(England) Aston Villa	Loan	10 July 2024	

== Pre-season ==
On 4 January 2024, Vasco da Gama announced a pair of friendly matches that would coincide with the Campeonao Carioca. The team began preparation for the season two days later.

=== Friendlies ===
18 January 2024	Vasco da Gama (Brazil)	1–0	(Argentina) San Lorenzo de Almagro

21 January 2024	Deportivo Maldonado (Uruguay)	0–1	(Brazil) Vasco da Gama

== Competitions ==
=== Overall record ===
Competition	First match	Last match	Starting round	Final position	Record							
Competition	First match	Last match	Starting round	Final position	Pld	W	D	L	GF	GA	GD	Win %
Série A	14 April 2024	4 December 2024	Matchday 1	10th	38	14	8	16	43	56	−13	36.84
Campeonato Carioca	18 January 2024	17 March 2024	Taça Guanabara	Semi-finals	13	6	5	2	21	12	+9	46.15
Copa do Brasil	28 February 2024	19 October 2024	Second round	Semi-final	10	3	5	2	16	14	+2	30.00
Total					61	23	18	20	80	82	−2	37.70

Source: Competitions

=== Série A ===
==== League table ====
Pos	Team	Pld	W	D	L	GF	GA	GD	Pts	Qualification or relegation
8	Bahia	38	15	8	15	49	49	0	53	Qualification for Copa Libertadores second stage
9	Cruzeiro	38	14	10	14	43	41	+2	52	Qualification for Copa Sudamericana group stage
10	Vasco da Gama	38	14	8	16	43	56	−13	50	Qualification for Copa Sudamericana group stage
11	Vitória	38	13	8	17	45	52	−7	47	Qualification for Copa Sudamericana group stage
12	Atlético Mineiro	38	11	14	13	47	54	−7	47	Qualification for Copa Sudamericana group stage

Source: CBF
Rules for classification: 1) points; 2) wins; 3) goal difference; 4) goals scored; 5) head-to-head results (only between two teams); 6) fewest red cards; 7) fewest yellow cards; 8) drawing of lots.

==== Results summary ====
Overall								Home						Away					
Pld	W	D	L	GF	GA	GD	Pts	W	D	L	GF	GA	GD	W	D	L	GF	GA	GD
16	6	2	8	19	26	−7	20	5	2	2	14	14	0	1	0	6	5	12	−7

Last updated: 10 July 2024.

==== Results by round ====
Round	1	2	3	4	5	6	7	8	9	10	11	12	13	14	15	16	17
Ground	H	A	A	H	A	H	H	A	H	A	H	A	H	H	A	H	A
Result	W	L	L	L	L	W	L	L	D	L	W	L	D	W	W	W	
Position																	

Updated to match(es) played on 10 July 2024. Source:
A = Away; H = Home; W = Win; D = Draw; L = Loss

==== Matches ====
The match schedule was released on 29 February.

14 April 2024 1	Vasco da Gama	2–1	Grêmio	Rio de Janeiro
				Stadium: São Januário; Attendance: 18,055; Referee: Flavio Rodrigues de Souza

17 April 2024 2	Red Bull Bragantino	2–1	Vasco da Gama	Bragança Paulista
				Stadium: Estádio Nabi Abi Chedid; Attendance: 5,448; Referee: Paulo Zanovelli da Silva

20 April 2024 3	Fluminense	2–1	Vasco da Gama	Rio de Janeiro
				Stadium: Maracanã; Attendance: 25,842; Referee: Wilton Sampaio

27 April 2024 4	Vasco da Gama	0–4	Criciúma	Rio de Janeiro
				Stadium: São Januário; Attendance: 17,607; Referee: Caio Augusto Vieira

5 May 2024 5	Athletico Paranaense	1–0	Vasco da Gama	Curitiba
				Stadium: Arena da Baixada; Attendance: 31,192; Referee: Anderson Daronco

12 May 2024 6	Vasco da Gama	2–1	Vitória	Rio de Janeiro
				Stadium: São Januário; Attendance: 11,094; Referee: Raphael Claus

2 June 2024 7	Vasco da Gama	1–6	Flamengo	Rio de Janeiro
				Stadium: Maracanã; Attendance: 62,292; Referee: Braulio da Silva Machado

13 June 2024 8	Palmeiras	2–0	Vasco da Gama	São Paulo
				Stadium: Allianz Parque; Attendance: 37,641; Referee: Ramon Abatti Abel

16 June 2024 9	Vasco da Gama	0–0	Cruzeiro

20 June 2024 10	Juventude	2–0	Vasco da Gama

23 June 2024 11	Vasco da Gama	4–1	São Paulo

26 June 2024 12	Bahia	2–1	Vasco da Gama

29 June 2024 13	Vasco da Gama	1–1	Botafogo

3 July 2024 14	Vasco da Gama	2–0	Fortaleza

7 July 2024 15	Internacional	1–2	Vasco da Gama

10 July 2024 16	Vasco da Gama	2–0	Corinthians

17 July 2024 17	Atlético Goianiense	0–1	Vasco da Gama

21 July 2024 18	Atlético Mineiro	2–0	Vasco da Gama

28 July 2024 20	Grêmio	1–0	Vasco da Gama

3 August 2024 21	Vasco da Gama	2–2	Red Bull Bragantino

10 August 2024 22	Vasco da Gama	2–0	Fluminense

18 August 2024 23	Criciúma	2–2	Vasco da Gama

26 August 2024 24	Vasco da Gama	2–1	Athletico Paranaense

1 September 2024 25	Vitória	0–1	Vasco da Gama

15 September 2024 26	Flamengo	1–1	Vasco da Gama

22 September 2024 27	Vasco da Gama	0–1	Palmeiras

29 September 2024 28	Cruzeiro	1–1	Vasco da Gama

5 October 2024 29	Vasco da Gama	1–1	Juventude

16 October 2024 30	São Paulo	3–0	Vasco da Gama

24 October 2024 19	Vasco da Gama	1–0	Cuiabá

28 October 2024 31	Vasco da Gama	3–2	Bahia

5 November 2024 32	Botafogo	3–0	Vasco da Gama

9 November 2024 33	Fortaleza	3–0	Vasco da Gama

21 November 2024 34	Vasco da Gama	0–1	Internacional

24 November 2024 35	Corinthians	3–1	Vasco da Gama

30 November 2024 36	Vasco da Gama	2–2	Atlético Goianiense

4 December 2024 37	Vasco da Gama	2–0	Atlético Mineiro

8 December 2024 38	Cuiabá	1–2	Vasco da Gama

=== Copa do Brasil ===
28 February 2024 Second round	Marcílio Dias	1–3	Vasco da Gama	Itajaí
21:30				Stadium: Estádio Hercílio Luz

2 May 2024 Third round First leg	Fortaleza	0–0	Vasco da Gama	Fortaleza
19:00				Stadium: Castelão

22 May 2024 Third round Second leg	Vasco da Gama	3–3 (3–3 agg.) (5–4 p)	Fortaleza	Rio de Janeiro
21:30				Stadium: São Januário
