= Roberto Dinamite =

Brazilian footballer and politician (1954–2023)

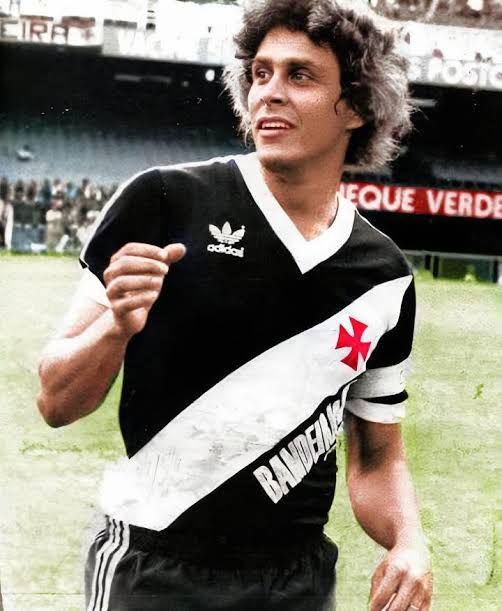
- Dinamite playing for Vasco da Gama in 1980s

President of Vasco da Gama
- In office 2008–2014
- Preceded by: Eurico Miranda
- Succeeded by: Eurico Miranda

Personal details
- Born: Carlos Roberto de Oliveira; 13 April 1954 Duque de Caxias, Brazil
- Died: 8 January 2023 (aged 68) Rio de Janeiro, Brazil
- Height: 1.86 m (6 ft 1 in)
- Occupation: Footballer
Association football career
- Positions: Centre-forward; second striker
Youth career
- 1969–1972: Vasco da Gama
Senior career*
Years	Team	Apps	(Gls)
1971–1979	Vasco da Gama	348	(233)
1979–1980	Barcelona	8	(2)
1980–1993	Vasco da Gama	392	(232)
1989	→ Portuguesa (loan)	17	(9)
1991	→ Campo Grande (loan)	14	(0)
Total		779	(476)
International career
1971–1972	Brazil U23	1	(0)
1975–1984	Brazil	38	(20)
Medal record
Men's Football
Representing Brazil
FIFA World Cup
Third place	1978 Argentina
Copa América
Second place	1983 South America
Third place	1979 South America
- * Club domestic league appearances and goals

Carlos Roberto de Oliveira (13 April 1954 – 8 January 2023), known as Roberto Dinamite, was a Brazilian footballer and politician.

He was born in Duque de Caxias, in the state of Rio de Janeiro. With a career as a forward spanning over twenty years, Roberto is the Vasco da Gama player with the most appearances and all-time top goalscorer, as well as the overall leading scorer in the Campeonato Brasileiro Série A and the Campeonato Carioca. In 2022, Vasco da Gama honored him with a statue at São Januário. In December 2024, the Brazilian Football Confederation designated the Campeonato Brasileiro Série A top-scorer award as the "Roberto Dinamite Trophy", establishing the title for all subsequent editions of the competition.

At the national level, Roberto Dinamite played in the 1978 and 1982 FIFA World Cups and the 1972 Olympic Games. He also was president of Vasco da Gama from 2008 to 2014, and Rio de Janeiro state deputy for five consecutive terms.

Including friendly matches, he has made over 1,000 appearances in his career.

== Club career ==
Roberto Dinamite was developed at Vasco da Gama youth squad. He is one of the most famous Vasco da Gama players, and is the club's greatest goal scorer. He scored 698 goals wearing the club's shirt and 864 goals in all his career. He played 1022 matches (768 official matches, and 254 friendly matches).

Roberto was nicknamed Dinamite by the journalist Aparício Pires, of Jornal dos Sports newspaper, after scoring a spectacular goal in his debut for the professional team, on 25 November 1971, against Internacional, at Maracanã stadium. The journalist wrote in the newspaper that the Dynamite-Boy detonates at Maracanã.

He helped Vasco da Gama win the 1974 Campeonato Brasileiro Série A and the 1977 Campeonato Carioca before moving to Barcelona in 1979. After only scoring 3 goals at Barcelona, he returned back to Vasco da Gama and won four more Campeonato Carioca (1982, 1987, 1988, 1992)

In 1989–90, he played for Portuguesa of São Paulo state, scoring 11 goals.

His last goal was scored on 26 October 1992, when, in Campeonato Carioca, Vasco da Gama beat Goytacaz 2–0 at São Januário Stadium.

Dinamite retired on 24 March 1993, when he was 39 years old. His last match was on that day, when Deportivo de La Coruña of Spain beat Vasco da Gama 2–0 at Maracanã stadium, in a friendly game in which Zico also played (for Vasco).

== International career ==
Roberto Dinamite earned 47 caps with the Brazil national team, between September 1975 and June 1984, scoring 25 goals, including matches against combined teams, and clubs. He played 38 matches against national teams (20 of them were official FIFA matches), and scored 20 goals, and the nine other matches were against combined teams, and clubs, scoring five goals in those matches. His first national team match was played on 30 September 1975, when the Peru national team beat Brazil 3–1. Roberto Dinamite's first Brazil national team goal was scored on 23 May 1976, when Brazil beat England 1–0. His last cap was earned on 17 June 1984, when Brazil and Argentina drew 0–0.

Dinamite was a reserve player in the 1978 FIFA World Cup, scoring three goals. He was also reserve player for Serginho in the 1982 FIFA World Cup, and was called by Telê Santana after Careca got injured.

Roberto Dinamite played five Brazil Olympic team matches, all of them in 1972. He scored one goal in his last match, played on 11 August 1972, when Brazil and Tuna Luso drew 1–1.

== Politics ==
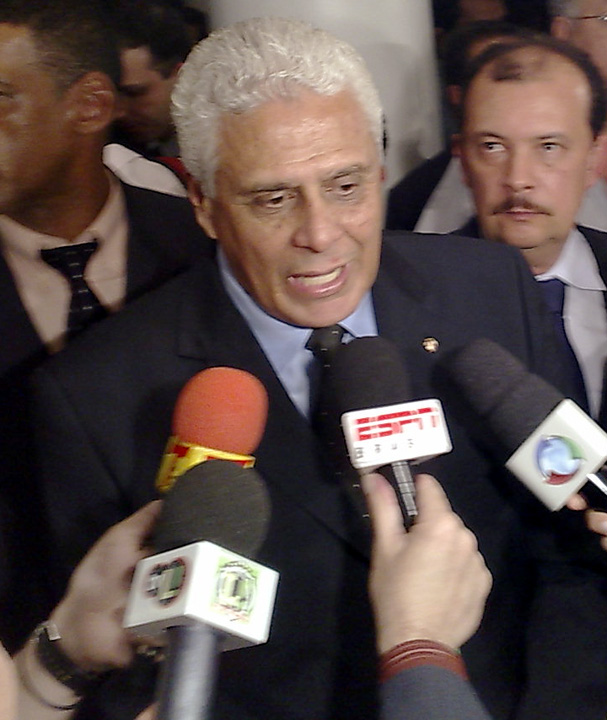
Roberto Dinamite in 2008.

After his retirement from football, he became a politician. In 1992, after joining the PSDB party, he ran for the Municipal Chamber of Rio de Janeiro, being elected vereador (alderman) with 34,893 votes.

As a member of PMDB, Roberto Dinamite was elected Rio de Janeiro state deputy in 1994, with 68,516 votes, in 1998, with 44,993 votes, in 2002, with 53,172 votes and in 2006, with 49,097 votes.

Roberto Dinamite was a candidate to Vasco da Gama presidency in 2003 and in 2006. He was elected president of Vasco da Gama on 21 June 2008.

== Death ==
Roberto Dinamite died of intestinal cancer in Rio de Janeiro on 8 January 2023, at the age of 68, after fighting against the disease since 2021.

== Career statistics ==
=== Club ===
Appearances and goals by club, season and competition
Club	Season	League			State League		Cup (Note: Includes Copa do Brasil, Supercopa do Brasil and Copa del Rey)		Continental		Total	
Club	Season	Division	Apps	Goals	Apps	Goals	Apps	Goals	Apps	Goals	Apps	Goals
Vasco da Gama	1971	Série A	6	1	0	0	—		—		6	1
Vasco da Gama	1972	Série A	11	4	11	2	—		—		22	6
Vasco da Gama	1973	Série A	32	13	19	5	—		—		51	18
Vasco da Gama	1974	Série A	26	16	20	17	—		—		46	33
Vasco da Gama	1975	Série A	19	15	28	25	—		6	2	53	42
Vasco da Gama	1976	Série A	19	12	26	15	—		—		45	27
Vasco da Gama	1977	Série A	17	7	27	25	—		—		44	32
Vasco da Gama	1978	Série A	17	14	21	19	—		—		38	33
Vasco da Gama	1979	Série A	14	10	35	33	—		—		49	43
Vasco da Gama	Total		161	92	187	141	0	0	6	2	354	235
Barcelona	1979–80	La Liga	8	2	—		1	0	2 (Note: Appearances in European Super Cup)	1	11	3
Vasco da Gama	1980	Série A	6	8	24	14	—		—		30	22
Vasco da Gama	1981	Série A	19	14	27	31	—		—		46	45
Vasco da Gama	1982	Série A	16	12	20	15	—		—		36	27
Vasco da Gama	1983	Série A	21	9	14	7	—		—		35	16
Vasco da Gama	1984	Série A	21	16	17	9	—		—		38	25
Vasco da Gama	1985	Série A	22	16	20	12	—		—		42	28
Vasco da Gama	1986	Série A	15	5	24	19	—		—		39	24
Vasco da Gama	1987	Série A	14	6	29	14	—		—		43	20
Vasco da Gama	1988	Série A	10	3	3	1	—		—		13	4
Vasco da Gama	1989	Série A	0	0	16	9	—		—		16	9
Vasco da Gama	1990	Série A	4	0	15	3	2	0	8	1	29	4
Vasco da Gama	1992	Série A	2	0	19	9	3	1	—		24	10
Vasco da Gama	Total		150	89	228	143	5	1	8	1	391	234
Portuguesa (loan)	1989	Série A	17	9	0	0	—		—		17	9
Campo Grande (loan)	1991	Série B	0	0	14	0	—		—		14	0
Career total			336	192	429	284	6	1	16	4	787	481

=== International ===
Appearances and goals by national team and year
National team	Year	Apps	Goals
Brazil	1975	2	0
Brazil	1976	6	6
Brazil	1977	10	6
Brazil	1978	6	3
Brazil	1979	2	1
Brazil	1980	0	0
Brazil	1981	1	1
Brazil	1982	2	0
Brazil	1983	7	3
Brazil	1984	2	0
Total		38	20

Scores and results list Brazil's goal tally first, score column indicates score after each Dinamite goal.

List of international goals scored by Roberto Dinamite
No.	Date	Venue	Opponent	Score	Result	Competition	Ref.
1	23 May 1976	Los Angeles Memorial Coliseum, Los Angeles, United States	England	1–0	1–0	1976 U.S.A. Bicentennial Cup Tournament	
2	31 May 1976	Yale Bowl, New Haven, United States	Italy	4–1	4–1	1976 U.S.A. Bicentennial Cup Tournament	
3	4 June 1976	Estadio Jalisco, Guadalajara, Mexico	Mexico	1–0	3–0	Friendly	
4	4 June 1976	Estadio Jalisco, Guadalajara, Mexico	Mexico	3–0	3–0	Friendly	
5	9 June 1976	Maracanã Stadium, Rio de Janeiro, Brazil	Paraguay	–	3–1	Friendly	
6	9 June 1976	Maracanã Stadium, Rio de Janeiro, Brazil	Paraguay	–	3–1	Friendly	
7	23 January 1977	Estádio do Morumbi, São Paulo, Brazil	Bulgaria	1–0	1–0	Friendly	
8	9 March 1977	Maracanã Stadium, Rio de Janeiro, Brazil	Colombia	1–0	6–0	1978 FIFA World Cup qualification	
9	9 March 1977	Maracanã Stadium, Rio de Janeiro, Brazil	Colombia	3–0	6–0	1978 FIFA World Cup qualification	
10	20 March 1977	Maracanã Stadium, Rio de Janeiro, Brazil	Paraguay	1–0	1–1	1978 FIFA World Cup qualification	
11	30 June 1977	Maracanã Stadium, Rio de Janeiro, Brazil	France	2–0	2–2	Friendly	
12	14 July 1977	Estadio Olímpico Pascual Guerrero, Cali, Colombia	Bolivia	3–0	8–0	1978 FIFA World Cup qualification	
13	11 June 1978	Estadio José María Minella, Mar del Plata, Argentina	Austria	1–0	1–0	1978 FIFA World Cup	
14	21 June 1978	Estadio Malvinas Argentinas, Mendoza, Argentina	Poland	2–1	3–1	1978 FIFA World Cup	
15	21 June 1978	Estadio Malvinas Argentinas, Mendoza, Argentina	Poland	3–1	3–1	1978 FIFA World Cup	
16	26 July 1979	Estadio Hernando Siles, La Paz, Bolivia	Bolivia	–	1–2	1979 Copa América	
17	28 October 1981	Estádio Olímpico Monumental, Porto Alegre, Brazil	Bulgaria	1–0	3–0	Friendly	
18	17 August 1983	Estadio Olímpico Atahualpa, Quito, Ecuador	Ecuador	1–0	1–0	1983 Copa América	
19	1 September 1983	Estádio Serra Dourada, Goiânia, Brazil	Ecuador	2–0	5–0	1983 Copa América	
20	1 September 1983	Estádio Serra Dourada, Goiânia, Brazil	Ecuador	3–0	5–0	1983 Copa América	

== Honours ==
Vasco da Gama

- Campeonato Brasileiro Série A: 1974
- Campeonato Carioca: 1977, 1982, 1987, 1988, 1992
- Copa Rio: 1992
- Taça Guanabara: 1976, 1977, 1986, 1987, 1990, 1992
- Taça Rio: 1984, 1988, 1992
- Torneio Extra: 1990

Brazil

- FIFA World Cup third place: 1978
- Copa América runner-up: 1983
- Copa América third place: 1979
- Taça do Atlântico: 1976
- Copa Río Branco: 1976
- Taça Oswaldo Cruz: 1976
- Bicentennial Cup: 1976

Brazil U23

- CONMEBOL Pre-Olympic: 1971

Brazil Masters

- World Cup of Masters: 1991

Rio de Janeiro

- Campeonato Brasileiro de Seleções Estaduais: 1987

Records and Individual

- 22nd-highest official goalscorer in football history: 517 goals (according to RSSSF)
- 4th-highest official free-kick goalscorer in football history: 73 goals
- Vasco da Gama all-time top goalscorer: 702 goals
- Campeonato Brasileiro Série A all-time top goalscorer: 190 goals
- Campeonato Carioca all-time top goalscorer: 284 goals
- Clássico dos Milhões (vs Flamengo) all-time top goalscorer: 27 goals
- Clássico dos Gigantes (vs Fluminense) all-time top goalscorer: 36 goals
- Clássico da Amizade (vs Botafogo) all-time top goalscorer: 25 goals
- Campeonato Brasileiro Série A top scorer: 1974 (16 goals), 1984 (16 goals)
- Campeonato Carioca top scorer: 1978 (19 goals), 1981 (31 goals), 1985 (12 goals)
- Bola de Prata: 1979, 1981, 1984
- Copa América top scorer: 1983 (3 goals)
- Maior Ídolo do Rio (Rio's Greatest Idol) by Jornal dos Sports newspaper: 1985
- Craque do Brasil (Outstanding player of Brazil) by Jornal dos Sports newspaper: 1985

== See also ==
- List of men's footballers with 500 or more goals
