= Clássico dos Milhões =

Football derby in Rio de Janeiro, Brazil

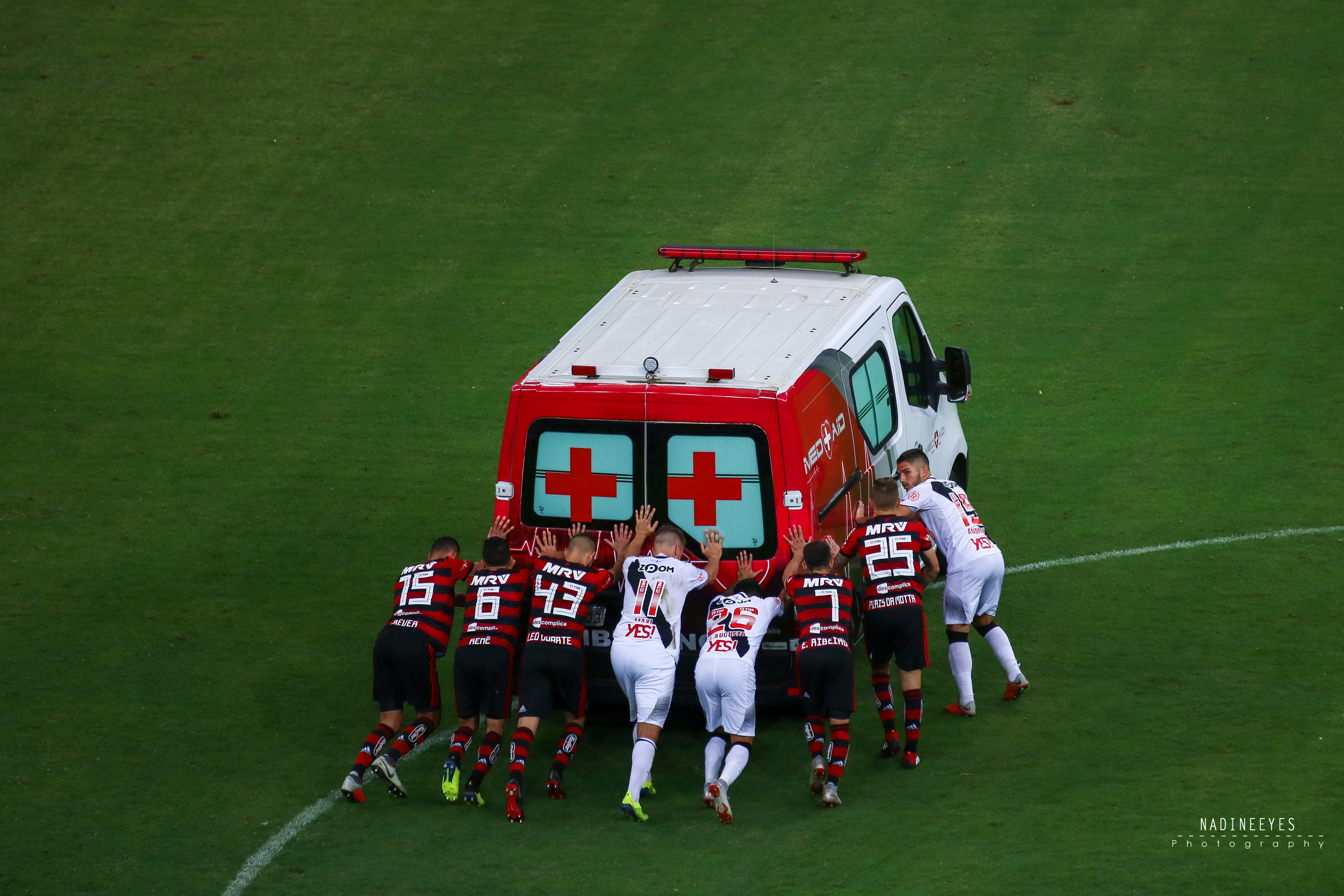
- Flamengo and Vasco players unite to push an ambulance.

- Flamengo Vasco da Gama
- Location: Rio de Janeiro, Brazil
- First meeting: Unofficial: 26 March 1922; Torneio Início; Flamengo 1–0 Vasco; Official: 29 April 1923; Campeonato Carioca; Flamengo 1–3 Vasco
- Latest meeting: 28 October 2026; Campeonato Brasileiro Série A Vasco 1–4 Flamengo
- Next meeting: TBD
- Stadiums: Maracanã (Note: Maracanã is owned by the state of Rio de Janeiro and managed by Flamengo and Fluminense. Although Vasco has its own stadium, São Januário, it hosts all local derbies at the Maracanã, due to a report from the Military Police that prohibits derbies in his home due to "security risks".)

Statistics
- Total meetings: 432
- Top scorer: Roberto Dinamite (27)
- All-time record: Flamengo: 169; Drawn: 124; Vasco: 139
- Largest victory: Vasco 7–0 Flamengo; Campeonato Carioca; 26 April 1931
- Longest unbeaten streak: Flamengo: 17 (2016–2021); Vasco: 20 (1945–1951)

Flamengo	Vasco da Gama

Clássico dos Milhões (English: Classic of the Millions) is the association football derby between CR Flamengo and CR Vasco da Gama, both from the city of Rio de Janeiro, Brazil. Considered one of the most fiercely contested derbies in Brazilian football, both in historic rivalry and in popularity. It has been named that way since its beginnings in the 1920s, as Flamengo and Vasco have the two largest fan bases in the state of Rio de Janeiro.

The derby is the fixture that has had an attendance of over 100,000 people the most times in the history of football, in addition to having the highest average attendance in the history of the Campeonato Brasileiro Série A. It is also among the seventeen oldest derbies of Brazilian football, as its first match happened in April 1923. Poll estimations, though variable, attribute Flamengo and Vasco two of the five largest Brazilian fanbases, with Flamengo consistently at first and Vasco usually at fifth. At Rio de Janeiro state level, polls suggest that both clubs have the two largest declared supporter bases, with Flamengo also at first in that matter.

Its intense rivalry, though more stressed in football since 1923 when Vasco rose to first division, started already in the prior decades in rowing regatte, as both clubs were founded in the late 19th century (Vasco in 1898 and Flamengo in 1895) as rowing clubs. Both teams also compete often at national level in other sports such as basketball, swimming, futsal and judo. Flamengo and Vasco have clashed in decisive and important matches in the Campeonato Carioca, Campeonato Brasileiro Série A and Copa do Brasil, even deciding the finals of the latter in the 2006 edition.

== History ==
The rivalry between Flamengo and Vasco da Gama dates back long before the clubs' football teams, as both were founded as rowing teams. The Grupo de Regatas do Flamengo was founded in 1895 by six young men from the Flamengo neighborhood and was present from the first Rio de Janeiro Rowing Championship in 1898. Also in 1898, the Club de Regatas Vasco da Gama was founded by 62 young men, most of them Portuguese immigrants, in the Saúde neighborhood, and would only begin participating in the championship the following year. The two clubs are still the most successful in the Rio de Janeiro Rowing Championship.

In 1912, the Flamengo football team was created and debuted in the Campeonato Carioca First Division that same year, finishing the competition in second place. Flamengo won its first championship in 1914. Vasco had its own football team in 1915, starting in the Third Division. In 1923, with Vasco's promotion to the First Division, the two teams began to face each other in football. The first official match took place on April 29, 1923, at the Paysandu Street Stadium, with Vasco winning 3–1. Vasco would eventually become champion in its debut year in the First Division, with Flamengo as runner-up. However, the previous year, there was an unofficial match played between both, with a 1–0 victory for Flamengo, for the Torneio Início, an opening competition of the Campeonato Carioca with rules different from the laws of the game, in which a full match lasted around 20 to 30 minutes. Since then, the two halves would face each other at least once every year, except in 1935 and 1936, when they split into two separate leagues.

Between 1940 and 1943, Flamengo would go on to have thirteen consecutive unbeaten games against Vasco. This would be surpassed a few years later by Vasco's Expresso da Vitória, which went 19 matches without losing to Flamengo from 1945 to 1951. However, the two teams only competed for a trophy again in the 1944 Campeonato Carioca, in which Flamengo edged Vasco by two points and was crowned champion. In the 1952 Campeonato Carioca, the two would once again fight for the title, with Vasco finishing six points ahead of Flamengo. At the time, both clubs were already known for their popular appeal, but the derby didn't feature a decisive match until the 1958 Campeonato Carioca, nicknamed the "Super-Supercampeonato" and considered unique because Botafogo, Flamengo, and Vasco had to play a triangular tiebreaker twice. The final match was played by Flamengo and Vasco, with the latter playing to a draw, which they ultimately achieved.

In the 1970s and 1980s, the rivalry was embodied by Roberto Dinamite and Zico (something like the Bird–Johnson rivalry in the NBA), still considered the two most important players in the history of each club, who played for approximately the same period. Both players crystallized the playing style of their teams, Zico personifying the more technical and refined Flamengo of the 1980s, and Dinamite the offensive and passionate style of Vasco at the time. The first major matches between the two began in the 1976 Taça Guanabara playoffs, where Zico missed a penalty, giving Vasco the comeback title. The same occurred a year later, giving Vasco the overall title. Later, Flamengo had a clear advantage, winning every tournament in 1978 and 1979. In the early 1980s, Vasco saw Flamengo win its three national titles, but still constantly challenged its archrivals for the title. After finishing runner-up to Flamengo in 1981, Vasco eventually defeated Flamengo's brilliant intercontinental champion team to win the 1982 Campeonato Carioca title again. Dinamite and Zico always showed enormous respect for their opponents and, in some way, were constantly admired by each other.

During the 1990s, two of the biggest figures in Brazilian football indirectly swapped players: Bebeto, who shone at Flamengo in the 1980s, was signed by Vasco in 1989, while Romário, who came up through Vasco's youth system and was a key player for the club, joined Flamengo in 1995. These changes increased the tension in the derbies, which were already naturally charged with the passion of the fans. The decade was also marked by historic thrashings on both sides. In 1991 Campeonato Carioca, Flamengo won 5–2 in a great offensive performance. Years later, Vasco experienced one of the best periods in its history and returned the favor with impressive victories: in 1997 Campeonato Carioca, the Vasco team beat Flamengo 4–1, with a memorable performance by Edmundo, and in 1999 Taça Rio, they won again 5–1.

In the 2000s, the rivalry remained intense and gained symbolic moments, such as the famous "chocolate" match on Easter Sunday, when Vasco beat Flamengo 5–1 in the 2000 Campeonato Carioca, in one of the most memorable performances of the period. Before the match, Vasco's director Eurico Miranda had given a chocolate egg to each fan in the stadium and, at the end of the match, uttered the famous phrase: "I gave Easter eggs to the fans, and chocolate to them". This game became a cultural reference between the fans and is remembered whenever expressive scores in the rivalry are discussed. However, the most remarkable event between the two clubs during this period was the 2006 Copa do Brasil finals, the only national final between Flamengo and Vasco to date. Flamengo won both games: 2–0 at the Maracanã in the first leg and 1–0 at São Januário in the second leg, winning the title against their biggest rival. The final was marked by a tense atmosphere, the mobilization of both fan bases, and the historical importance of a decisive national-level match. Even with ups and downs—such as Vasco's relegation in 2008 and Flamengo's inconsistent periods—the direct confrontations of that decade remained intense and competitive.

In the 2010s, Flamengo restructured itself financially and sportingly starting in 2013, while Vasco faced its worst decade with three relegations in the national league, but still managed to prevail in several derbies. The biggest proof of this was Vasco's unbeaten streak of 10 games against Flamengo between 2015 and 2017. The period also provided memorable matches, such as the 4–4 draw in the 2019 Campeonato Brasileiro Série A, considered one of the greatest derby matches of the century.

In the 2020s, the rivalry entered a scenario of distinct sporting realities. Flamengo maintained competitive squads at both national and international levels, while Vasco went through a complicated period, with fluctuations, financial difficulties, and relegations that reflected its search for stability. The arrival of the Sociedade Anônima do Futebol (SAF) marked a reconstruction process at the Vasco club. Even so, the rivalry remained intense and, at times, unbalanced in terms of score: the most emblematic example was Flamengo's 6–1 thrashing of Vasco in the 2024 Campeonato Brasileiro Série A, a result that had a great impact because it symbolized, on the field, the difference in form between the teams at that moment.

== Statistics ==
=== Match summary ===
As of 28 October 2026

Competition	Matches	Flamengo wins	Draws	Vasco wins	Flamengo goals	Vasco goals
Campeonato Brasileiro Série A	72	27	27	18	99	79
Copa do Brasil	4	2	1	1	4	2
Torneio Rio–São Paulo	19	7	8	4	26	18
Campeonato Carioca (Note: A match played on September 15, 1940, won by Flamengo 3–0, was simultaneously valid for the Torneio Rio-São Paulo and for the Campeonato Carioca of that season. In this table, this match is only being considered as a Torneio Rio-São Paulo game so it is not counted twice.)	249	101	68	80	332	305
Other Rio tournaments (Note: Includes numerous short-lived official tournaments held by the Rio football federation and other local entities. Namely the Taça Guanabara Independente, Torneio Municipal do Rio, Torneio Extra, Torneio Relâmpago, Copa da Capital, Copa Rio de Janeiro, Taça Cidade Maravilhosa, Taça Cidade do Rio de Janeiro and Taça Cidade de Cabo Frio.)	36	13	10	13	49	53
Torneio Início Carioca (Note: Torneio Início matches were held with 20 or 30 minutes, and corners served as a tiebreaker. These matches are not considered official, as they do not follow the criteria established by FIFA. However, they are included in the statistics of all Rio de Janeiro derbies.)	14	4	5	5	7	11
Friendly matches and competitions	38	15	5	18	61	67
Total	432	169	124	139	578	535

Sources: Flaestatística

=== Summary by stadium ===
As of 28 October 2026

Stadium	Matches	Flamengo wins	Draws	Vasco wins	Flamengo goals	Vasco goals
Maracanã	280	113	90	77	354	299
São Januário	43	13	11	19	57	77
Laranjeiras	25	10	6	9	46	41
Nilton Santos	15	8	5	2	24	14
Gávea	14	6	1	7	22	23
Rua Paysandu	10	3	1	6	13	17
General Severiano	7	2	2	3	14	16
Mané Garrincha (Brasília)	6	2	4	0	10	6
Others	32	12	4	16	38	42
Total	431	168	124	139	578	535

== Records ==
=== Largest wins ===
- Vasco 7–0 Flamengo, April 26, 1931, Campeonato Carioca
- Vasco 1–6 Flamengo, June 2, 2024, Campeonato Brasileiro Série A

=== Longest undefeated runs ===
- Vasco da Gama: 23 (17 wins and 6 draws), 13 May 1945 – 25 March 1951
- Flamengo: 17 (8 wins and 9 draws), 25 February 2017 – 4 February 2021

=== Most consecutive wins ===
Games	Club	Period
10	Vasco da Gama	19 July 1947 – 13 November 1949
6	Vasco da Gama	14 July 1930 – 18 October 1931
5	Vasco da Gama	8 May 1988 – 4 September 1988
5	Flamengo	16 September 1990 – 24 November 1991
4	Vasco da Gama	3 May 1928 – 10 March 1929
4	Flamengo	15 November 1963 – 22 November 1964
4	Vasco da Gama	10 May 1967 – 2 December 1967
4	Flamengo	5 August 1969 – 22 February 1970
4	Flamengo	11 June 2000 – 22 February 2001
4	Flamengo	13 March 2023 – 22 October 2023

=== Most consecutive draws ===
Games	Period
6	28 October 2017 – 31 March 2019

=== Doing the double in the Série A ===
Since 2003, when the Campeonato Brasileiro adopted the round-robin system, one of the teams has beaten their rivals in both matches 7 times.

Season	Team	Results	
2003	Flamengo	2–1	2–1
2004	Vasco	1–0	1–0
2006	Vasco	1–0	3–1
2008	Flamengo	3–1	1–0
2015	Vasco	1–0	2–1
2020	Flamengo	2–1	2–0
2023	Flamengo	4–1	1–0

=== Major finals between the clubs ===
Season	Competition	Date	Match	Score	Winner
1981	Campeonato Carioca	29 November 1981	Flamengo – Vasco	0–2	Flamengo
1981	Campeonato Carioca	2 December 1981	Vasco – Flamengo	1–0	Flamengo
1981	Campeonato Carioca	6 December 1981	Flamengo – Vasco	2–1	Flamengo
1986	Campeonato Carioca	3 August 1986	Flamengo – Vasco	0–0	Flamengo
1986	Campeonato Carioca	6 August 1986	Flamengo – Vasco	0–0	Flamengo
1986	Campeonato Carioca	10 August 1986	Flamengo – Vasco	2–0	Flamengo
1988	Campeonato Carioca	19 June 1988	Flamengo – Vasco	1–2	Vasco
1988	Campeonato Carioca	22 June 1988	Vasco – Flamengo	1–0	Vasco
1999	Campeonato Carioca	13 June 1999	Flamengo – Vasco	1–1	Flamengo
1999	Campeonato Carioca	19 June 1999	Vasco – Flamengo	0–1	Flamengo
2000	Campeonato Carioca	11 June 2000	Flamengo – Vasco	3–0	Flamengo
2000	Campeonato Carioca	17 June 2000	Vasco – Flamengo	1–2	Flamengo
2001	Campeonato Carioca	20 May 2001	Flamengo – Vasco	1–2	Flamengo
2001	Campeonato Carioca	27 May 2001	Vasco – Flamengo	1–3	Flamengo
2004	Campeonato Carioca	11 April 2004	Flamengo – Vasco	2–1	Flamengo
2004	Campeonato Carioca	18 April 2004	Vasco – Flamengo	1–3	Flamengo
2006	Copa do Brasil	19 July 2006	Flamengo – Vasco	2–0	Flamengo
2006	Copa do Brasil	26 July 2006	Vasco – Flamengo	0–1	Flamengo
2014	Campeonato Carioca	6 April 2014	Vasco – Flamengo	1–1	Flamengo
2014	Campeonato Carioca	13 April 2014	Flamengo – Vasco	1–1	Flamengo
2019	Campeonato Carioca	14 April 2019	Vasco – Flamengo	0–2	Flamengo
2019	Campeonato Carioca	21 April 2019	Flamengo – Vasco	2–0	Flamengo

- Finals won: Flamengo 9, Vasco 1.

=== Highest attendances ===
- Flamengo 3–1 Vasco; 174,770 (April 4, 1976)
- Flamengo 0–0 Vasco; 165,358 (December 22, 1974)
- Flamengo 2–1 Vasco; 162,506 (October 17, 1954)
- Flamengo 2–1 Vasco; 161,989 (December 6, 1981)
- Flamengo 1–0 Vasco; 160,342 (May 6, 1973)
- Flamengo 2–1 Vasco; 155,098 (May 1, 1968)
- Flamengo 0–0 (4–5 p) Vasco; 152,059 (September 28, 1977)
- Flamengo 1–1 Vasco; 141,045 (January 17, 1959)
- Flamengo 0–3 Vasco; 134,787 (April 24, 1977)
- Flamengo 1–1 (4–5 p) Vasco; 133,444 (June 13, 1976)

*All matches were played at the Maracanã and were valid for the Campeonato Carioca.

== Clubs comparison ==
=== Honours ===
Level	Competitions	Flamengo	Vasco da Gama
Intercontinental	Intercontinental Cup	1	–
Intercontinental	Tournoi de Paris	–	1
Continental	South American Championship	–	1
Continental	Copa Libertadores	4	1
Continental	Copa Mercosur	1	1
Continental	Recopa Sudamericana	1	–
Continental	Copa de Oro	1	–
International	Torneio Octogonal Rivadávia	–	1
National	Campeonato Brasileiro Série A	8	4
National	Copa do Brasil	5	1
National	Supercopa do Brasil	3	–
National	Copa dos Campeões	1	–
Inter-state	Torneio Rio–São Paulo^{(1)}	1	3
Inter-state	Torneio João Havelange	–	1
State	Campeonato Carioca	40	24
Total		66	38
Other	State and city trophies^{(2)}	13	26
Other	Copa União - Módulo Verde	1	–
Other	Campeonato Brasileiro Série B	–	1
Total General		80	65

^{(1)} In 1940 the competition was interrupted with Flamengo and Fluminense tied in the lead, without the CBD making the title official, however, the clubs and newspapers at the time considered the result definitive and declared both Flamengo and Fluminense as the legitimate champions of the competition. The two clubs currently consider themselves champions of that competition and include it among their titles.

^{(2)} "Other State and city trophies" include: Copa Rio, Taça Guanabara Independente, Torneio Extra, Torneio Relâmpago, Torneio Início, Torneio Aberto, Campeonato da Capital, Torneio Gérson dos Santos Coelho, Taça da Cidade do Rio de Janeiro, Taça da Cidade de Cabo Frio and Campeonato Carioca Série B.

=== Titles by decade ===
Decade	Flamengo	Vasco
1911–1920	3	–
1921–1930	3	3
1931–1940	1	2
1941–1950	3	5
1951–1960	3	6
1961–1970	3	2
1971–1980	6	2
1981–1990	7	4
1991–2000	7	10
2001–2010	8	1
2011–2020	11	3
2021–2030	11	–
Total	66	38

== Related works ==
=== Books ===
- Assaf, Roberto; Martins, Clóvis (1999). Flamengo x Vasco: O Clássico dos Milhões. Relume Dumará. ISBN 85-7316-184-1.

=== Videos ===
- Duels de légende /vol.2 Flamengo – Vasco da Gama, Rod Hay 2005, Warner Vision France
