= 1923 Campeonato Carioca =

Campeonato Carioca
- Season: 1923
- Champions: Vasco da Gama
- Matches: 114
- Goals: 459 (4.03 per match)
- Top goalscorer: Nonô (Flamengo) – 17 goals
- Biggest home win: Villa Isabel 10-0 Americano (August 26, 1923)
- Biggest away win: Americano 1-6 Mangueira (May 20, 1923)
- Highest scoring: Villa Isabel 10-0 Americano (August 26, 1923)

The 1923 Campeonato Carioca, the eighteenth edition of that championship, kicked off on April 15, 1923 and ended on October 14, 1923. It was organized by LMDT (Liga Metropolitana de Desportos Terrestres, or Metropolitan Land Sports League). Sixteen teams participated. Vasco da Gama won the title for the 1st time. No teams were relegated.

== Participating teams ==
Club	Home location	Previous season
América	Tijuca, Rio de Janeiro	1st
Americano	Engenho de Dentro, Rio de Janeiro	10th
Andarahy	Andaraí, Rio de Janeiro	6th
Bangu	Bangu, Rio de Janeiro	5th
Botafogo	Botafogo, Rio de Janeiro	4th
Brasil	Urca, Rio de Janeiro	2nd (Second level)
Carioca	Jardim Botânico, Rio de Janeiro	11th
Flamengo	Flamengo, Rio de Janeiro	2nd
Fluminense	Laranjeiras, Rio de Janeiro	3rd
Mackenzie	Méier, Rio de Janeiro	14th
Mangueira	Tijuca, Rio de Janeiro	13th
Palmeiras	São Cristóvão, Rio de Janeiro	12th
River	Piedade, Rio de Janeiro	1st (Second level)
São Cristóvão	São Cristóvão, Rio de Janeiro	7th
Vasco da Gama	São Cristóvão, Rio de Janeiro	8th
Villa Isabel	Vila Isabel, Rio de Janeiro	9th

== System ==
The tournament would be disputed in two stages:

- First stage: The sixteen teams would be divided into two groups of eight : Série A, with the teams that had finished from 1st to 8th in the previous year's championship, and Série B, with those that had finished from 9th to 14th and the two teams promoted from the Second level. The teams in each group played each other in a double round-robin format. The champions of Série A and Série B would qualify into the Finals, while the last-placed team in Série B would dispute a playoff against the champions of the Second Level.
- Final stage: However, before the Finals, the champions of Série B would have to play against the last-placed team of Série A. If they won that match, they qualified for the Finals while the other team would be relegated to the Série B. In case of any other result, the Série A champions would win the title automatically, and no relegation or promotion across groups would take place.

== Championship ==
=== Série A ===
Pos	Team	Pld	W	D	L	GF	GA	GD	Pts	Qualification or relegation
1	Vasco da Gama	14	12	1	1	32	19	+13	25	Qualified to Finals
2	Flamengo	14	8	3	3	39	23	+16	19	
3	São Cristóvão	14	8	1	5	34	23	+11	17	
4	Fluminense	14	5	4	5	33	26	+7	14	
5	América	14	5	3	6	20	25	−5	13	
6	Andarahy	14	3	4	7	20	29	−9	10	
7	Bangu	14	3	4	7	28	43	−15	10	
8	Botafogo	14	2	0	12	21	39	−18	4	Qualifying Match for Finals

Updated to match(es) played on August 26, 1923. Source: RSSSF.com
Rules for classification: 1) points; 2) goal difference; 3) wins; 4) number of goals scored.

=== Série B ===
Pos	Team	Pld	W	D	L	GF	GA	GD	Pts	Qualification or relegation
1	Villa Isabel	14	9	3	2	42	17	+25	21	Playoffs
2	Mangueira	14	9	3	2	27	12	+15	21	Playoffs
3	Carioca	14	8	1	5	37	19	+18	17	
4	Mackenzie	14	8	1	5	36	23	+13	17	
5	River	14	5	4	5	23	25	−2	14	
6	Brasil	14	5	0	9	28	33	−5	10	
7	Palmeiras	14	3	2	9	13	35	−22	8	
8	Americano	14	2	0	12	15	57	−42	4	Relegation Playoffs

Updated to match(es) played on August 26, 1923. Source: RSSSF.com
Rules for classification: 1) points; 2) goal difference; 3) wins; 4) number of goals scored.

==== Playoffs ====
20 September 1923

Villa Isabel	3 – 2 (a.e.t.)	Mangueira

Rua General Severiano, Rio de Janeiro

=== Final phase ===
14 October 1923

Botafogo	3 – 1	Villa Isabel
Neco; Alkindar		Lalá

Laranjeiras, Rio de Janeiro
Referee: Laís

Villa Isabel eliminated; Vasco da Gama declared champions

=== Final standings ===
Pos	Team	Pld	W	D	L	GF	GA	GD	Pts	Qualification or relegation
1	Vasco da Gama	14	12	1	1	32	19	+13	25	Champions
2	Flamengo	14	8	3	3	39	23	+16	19	
3	São Cristóvão	14	8	1	5	34	23	+11	17	
4	Fluminense	14	5	4	5	33	26	+7	14	
5	América	14	5	3	6	20	25	−5	13	
6	Andarahy	14	3	4	7	20	29	−9	10	
7	Bangu	14	3	4	7	28	43	−15	10	
8	Botafogo	14	2	0	12	21	39	−18	4	
9	Villa Isabel	14	9	3	2	42	17	+25	21	
10	Mangueira	14	9	3	2	27	12	+15	21	
11	Carioca	14	8	1	5	37	19	+18	17	
12	Mackenzie	14	8	1	5	36	23	+13	17	
13	River	14	5	4	5	23	25	−2	14	
14	Brasil	14	5	0	9	28	33	−5	10	
15	Palmeiras	14	3	2	9	13	35	−22	8	
16	Americano	14	2	0	12	15	57	−42	4	Relegated

Updated to match(es) played on October 14, 1923. Source: RSSSF.com
Rules for classification: 1) points; 2) goal difference; 3) wins; 4) number of goals scored.

=== Relegation Playoffs ===
The regulation stipulated that a playoff would be held between Americano, the last-placed team in Série B and Hellênico, the champions of the Second Level. Hellênico won the playoff. Americano would have been relegated, but after the subsequent split between LMDT and AMEA, Americano participated in the 1924 LMDT championship anyway.

9 September 1923

Hellênico	2 – 0	Americano

Rua Paysandu, Rio de Janeiro
