= 1997 Campeonato Carioca =

Campeonato Carioca
- Season: 1997
- Champions: Botafogo
- Relegated: Barreira
- Copa do Brasil: Flamengo; Fluminense; Botafogo; Vasco da Gama
- Série C: América
- Matches played: 112
- Goals scored: 291 (2.6 per match)
- Top goalscorer: Romário (Flamengo) - 18 goals
- Biggest home win: Flamengo 7-0 Madureira (March 6, 1997)
- Biggest away win: Bangu 0-5 Botafogo (March 5, 1997); Barreira 0-5 Flamengo (March 2, 1997)
- Highest scoring: Botafogo 6-2 Barreira (February 19, 1997); Madureira 3-5 Americano (April 6, 1997)

The 1997 edition of the Campeonato Carioca kicked off on January 12, 1997 and ended on July 8, 1997. It is the official tournament organized by FFERJ (Federação de Futebol do Estado do Rio de Janeiro, or Rio de Janeiro State Football Federation. Only clubs based in the Rio de Janeiro State are allowed to play. Twelve teams contested this edition. Botafogo won the title for the 17th time. Barreira was relegated.

== System ==
The tournament was divided in three stages:

- Taça Guanabara: The twelve teams all played in single round-robin format against each other. The eight best teams qualified to the Taça Rio, the best two among them playing a final match against each other to define the champions. The bottom team was relegated.
- Taça Rio: The 8 remaining clubs all played in single round-robin format against each other. The six best teams qualified to the Third phase.
- Third phase: The six remaining clubs all played in single round-robin format against each other.
- Finals: Their format would depend on the quantity of teams that won the previous stages. In case that one team won two and other one, which was the case that wound up happening, the winner of the most phases would gain four bonus points, and the Finals would be disputed in a best-of-six points series.

== Championship ==
=== Taça Guanabara ===
| Pos | Team | Pld | W | D | L | GF | GA | GD | Pts | Qualification or relegation |
|---|---|---|---|---|---|---|---|---|---|---|
| 1 | Botafogo | 11 | 11 | 0 | 0 | 29 | 8 | +21 | 33 | Qualified to Taça Guanabara Finals |
| 2 | Vasco da Gama | 11 | 8 | 1 | 2 | 21 | 11 | +10 | 25 | Qualified to Taça Guanabara Finals |
| 3 | Flamengo | 11 | 7 | 3 | 1 | 31 | 8 | +23 | 24 | Qualified to Taça Rio |
| 4 | Madureira | 11 | 6 | 0 | 5 | 14 | 16 | −2 | 18 | Qualified to Taça Rio |
| 5 | Bangu | 11 | 4 | 4 | 3 | 19 | 19 | 0 | 16 | Qualified to Taça Rio |
| 6 | Fluminense | 11 | 4 | 3 | 4 | 13 | 13 | 0 | 15 | Qualified to Taça Rio |
| 7 | Americano | 11 | 4 | 1 | 6 | 10 | 13 | −3 | 13 | Qualified to Taça Rio |
| 8 | Volta Redonda | 11 | 3 | 3 | 5 | 13 | 16 | −3 | 12 | Qualified to Taça Rio |
| 9 | América | 11 | 1 | 6 | 4 | 9 | 13 | −4 | 9 | Eliminated |
| 10 | Itaperuna | 11 | 2 | 1 | 8 | 9 | 21 | −12 | 7 | Eliminated |
| 11 | Olaria | 11 | 1 | 4 | 6 | 12 | 21 | −9 | 7 | Eliminated |
| 12 | Barreira | 11 | 1 | 2 | 8 | 8 | 29 | −21 | 5 | Relegated |

Updated to match(es) played on March 26, 1997. Source: RSSSF.com
Rules for classification: 1) points; 2) wins; 3) goal difference; 4) number of goals scored.

==== Finals ====
| Team 1 | Score | Team 2 |
|---|---|---|
| Botafogo | 1–0 | Vasco da Gama |

=== Taça Rio ===
| Pos | Team | Pld | W | D | L | GF | GA | GD | Pts | Qualification or relegation |
|---|---|---|---|---|---|---|---|---|---|---|
| 1 | Botafogo | 7 | 4 | 3 | 0 | 8 | 4 | +4 | 15 | Qualified |
| 2 | Flamengo | 7 | 4 | 2 | 1 | 16 | 9 | +7 | 14 | Qualified |
| 3 | Fluminense | 7 | 4 | 2 | 1 | 10 | 5 | +5 | 14 | Qualified |
| 4 | Vasco da Gama | 7 | 3 | 1 | 3 | 6 | 6 | 0 | 10 | Qualified |
| 5 | Americano | 7 | 2 | 2 | 3 | 8 | 11 | −3 | 8 | Qualified |
| 6 | Bangu | 7 | 1 | 3 | 3 | 6 | 8 | −2 | 6 | Qualified |
| 7 | Volta Redonda | 7 | 1 | 1 | 5 | 7 | 14 | −7 | 4 | Eliminated |
| 8 | Madureira | 7 | 0 | 4 | 3 | 7 | 11 | −4 | 4 | Eliminated |

Updated to match(es) played on May 3, 1997. Source: RSSSF.com
Rules for classification: 1) points; 2) wins; 3) goal difference; 4) number of goals scored.

=== Third phase ===
| Pos | Team | Pld | W | D | L | GF | GA | GD | Pts | Qualification or relegation |
|---|---|---|---|---|---|---|---|---|---|---|
| 1 | Vasco da Gama | 5 | 3 | 2 | 0 | 10 | 3 | +7 | 11 | Qualified to Finals |
| 2 | Fluminense | 5 | 3 | 2 | 0 | 9 | 5 | +4 | 11 | |
| 3 | Americano | 5 | 2 | 2 | 1 | 5 | 4 | +1 | 8 | |
| 4 | Botafogo | 5 | 1 | 2 | 2 | 3 | 5 | −2 | 5 | |
| 5 | Flamengo | 5 | 1 | 1 | 3 | 2 | 5 | −3 | 4 | |
| 6 | Bangu | 5 | 0 | 1 | 4 | 2 | 9 | −7 | 1 | |

Updated to match(es) played on July 3, 1997. Source: RSSSF.com
Rules for classification: 1) points; 2) wins; 3) goal difference; 4) number of goals scored.

=== Finals ===
| Teams | | | Scores | | | |
| Team 1 | Points | Team 2 | 1st leg | 2nd leg | 3rd leg | Agg. |
|---|---|---|---|---|---|---|
| Vasco da Gama | 3:7 | Botafogo | 1:0 | 0:1 | – | – |

5 July 1997

| Vasco da Gama | 1–0 | Botafogo |
|---|---|---|
| Ramon 4' | Report |

Maracanã, Rio de Janeiro
Attendance: 6,116
Referee: Francisco Dacildo Mourão

8 July 1997

| Botafogo | 1–0 | Vasco da Gama |
|---|---|---|
| Dimba 78' | Report |

Maracanã, Rio de Janeiro
Attendance: 16,854
Referee: Sidrack Marinho dos Santos

Botafogo wins the championship on bonus points; as they had won the Guanabara and Rio, each for two bonus points.
