= 1923 in Brazilian football =

Football in Brazil
- Season: 1923

The following article presents a summary of the 1923 football (soccer) season in Brazil, which was the 22nd season of competitive football in the country.

== Campeonato Paulista ==
Final Stage

| Position | Team | Points | Played | Won | Drawn | Lost | For | Against | Difference |
|---|---|---|---|---|---|---|---|---|---|
| 1 | Corinthians | 29 | 17 | 14 | 1 | 2 | 53 | 14 | 39 |
| 2 | Palestra Itália-SP | 24 | 17 | 11 | 2 | 4 | 44 | 22 | 22 |
| 3 | Sírio | 23 | 17 | 10 | 3 | 4 | 35 | 20 | 15 |
| 4 | AA São Bento | 19 | 17 | 8 | 3 | 6 | 35 | 33 | 2 |
| 5 | Portuguesa | 18 | 17 | 6 | 6 | 5 | 25 | 25 | 0 |
| 6 | Ypiranga-SP | 15 | 17 | 5 | 5 | 7 | 22 | 24 | −2 |
| 7 | Germânia | 14 | 17 | 6 | 2 | 9 | 27 | 42 | −15 |
| 8 | AA das Palmeiras | 11 | 17 | 4 | 3 | 10 | 26 | 47 | −21 |

Corinthians declared as the Campeonato Paulista champions.

== State championship champions ==
| State | Champion | State | Champion |
|---|---|---|---|
| Amazonas | Nacional | Paraná | Britânia |
| Bahia | Botafogo-BA | Pernambuco | Sport Recife |
| Ceará | Fortaleza | Rio de Janeiro (DF) | Vasco |
| Espírito Santo | América-ES | Rio Grande do Norte | ABC |
| Maranhão | Football Athletic Club | Rio Grande do Sul | not disputed |
| Minas Gerais | América-MG | São Paulo | Corinthians |
| Pará | Paysandu | Sergipe | Cotingüiba |
| Paraíba | América-PB | | |

== Other competition champions ==
| Competition | Champion |
|---|---|
| Campeonato Brasileiro de Seleções Estaduais | São Paulo |

== Brazil national team ==
The following table lists all the games played by the Brazil national football team in official competitions and friendly matches during 1923.

| Date | Opposition | Result | Score | Brazil scorers | Competition |
|---|---|---|---|---|---|
| November 11, 1923 | Paraguay | L | 0–1 | – | South American Championship |
| November 18, 1923 | Argentina | L | 1–2 | Nilo | South American Championship |
| November 21, 1923 | Paraguay | W | 2–0 | Zezé I, Nilo | Taça Rodrigues Alves |
| November 25, 1923 | Uruguay | L | 1–2 | Nilo | South American Championship |
| November 28, 1923 | (Uruguay) Durazno Combined Team | W | 9–0 | ZezéI (4), Amaro, Nilo (2), Coelho (2) | International Friendly (unofficial match) |
| December 2, 1923 | Argentina | W | 2–0 | Zezé I, Nilo | Taça Confraternidad Brasil-Argentina |
| December 9, 1923 | Argentina | L | 0–2 | – | Roca Cup |
