= 1985 Campeonato Carioca =

Campeonato Carioca
- Season: 1985
- Champions: Fluminense
- Relegated: Bonsucesso; Volta Redonda
- Copa Brasil: Fluminense; Bangu; Flamengo; Vasco da Gama; América; Botafogo
- Matches: 136
- Goals: 275 (2.02 per match)
- Top goalscorer: Roberto Dinamite (Vasco da Gama) - 12 goals
- Biggest home win: Vasco da Gama 7-1 Volta Redonda (October 31, 1985)
- Biggest away win: Volta Redonda 0-4 Olaria (November 3, 1985)
- Highest scoring: Vasco da Gama 7-1 Volta Redonda (October 31, 1985)

The 1985 edition of the Campeonato Carioca kicked off on August 25, 1985 and ended on December 18, 1985. It is the official tournament organized by FFERJ (Federação de Futebol do Estado do Rio de Janeiro, or Rio de Janeiro State Football Federation. Only clubs based in the Rio de Janeiro State are allowed to play. Twelve teams contested this edition. Fluminense won the title for the 27th time. Bonsucesso and Volta Redonda were relegated.

== System ==
The tournament would be divided in three stages:

- Taça Guanabara: The twelve teams all played in a single round-robin format against each other. The champions qualified to the final phase.
- Taça Rio: The twelve teams all played in a single round-robin format against each other. The champions qualified to the final phase.
- Final phase: The champions of the two stages, plus the team with the best overall record would play that phase. in case three different teams qualified, each team played in a single round-robin format against each other and the team with the most points won the title. in case the same team won one of the states and was the team with the best record, they would hold a three-match final series against the other stage winner.

== Championship ==
=== Taça Guanabara ===
Pos	Team	Pld	W	D	L	GF	GA	GD	Pts	Qualification or relegation
1	Fluminense	11	8	3	0	13	3	+10	19	Qualified to Final phase
2	Vasco da Gama	11	6	5	0	20	6	+14	17	
3	Bangu	11	6	4	1	20	8	+12	16	
4	Flamengo	11	5	4	2	12	6	+6	14	
5	Botafogo	11	4	3	4	6	6	0	11	
6	Portuguesa	11	4	1	6	8	18	−10	9	
7	América	11	3	3	5	8	8	0	9	
8	Olaria	11	3	3	5	8	11	−3	9	
9	Volta Redonda	11	3	3	5	10	14	−4	9	
10	Americano	11	3	3	5	8	15	−7	9	
11	Goytacaz	11	2	3	6	10	9	+1	7	
12	Bonsucesso	11	1	1	9	4	23	−19	3	

Updated to match(es) played on October 10, 1985. Source: RSSSF.com
Rules for classification: 1) points; 2) wins; 3) goal difference; 4) number of goals scored.

=== Taça Rio ===
Pos	Team	Pld	W	D	L	GF	GA	GD	Pts	Qualification or relegation
1	Flamengo	11	8	3	0	18	5	+13	19	Playoffs
2	Bangu	11	8	3	0	18	6	+12	19	Playoffs
3	América	11	6	4	1	18	8	+10	16	
4	Fluminense	11	6	3	2	16	7	+9	15	
5	Vasco da Gama	11	5	2	4	18	9	+9	12	
6	Americano	11	3	6	2	8	8	0	12	
7	Bonsucesso	11	4	2	5	9	20	−11	10	
8	Olaria	11	1	6	4	8	8	0	8	
9	Goytacaz	11	1	6	4	7	11	−4	8	
10	Botafogo	11	1	3	7	8	16	−8	5	
11	Portuguesa	11	0	5	6	6	15	−9	5	
12	Volta Redonda	11	0	3	8	8	26	−18	3	

Updated to match(es) played on December 1, 1985. Source: RSSSF.com
Rules for classification: 1) points; 2) wins; 3) goal difference; 4) number of goals scored.

==== Playoffs ====
Team 1	Score	Team 2
Flamengo	1–0	Bangu

=== Aggregate table ===
Pos	Team	Pld	W	D	L	GF	GA	GD	Pts	Qualification or relegation
1	Bangu	22	14	7	1	38	14	+24	35	Qualified to Final phase
2	Fluminense	24	16	6	2	29	10	+19	38	
3	Flamengo	22	13	7	2	30	11	+19	33	
4	Vasco da Gama	22	11	7	4	38	15	+23	29	
5	América	22	9	7	6	26	16	+10	25	
6	Americano	22	6	9	7	16	23	−7	21	
7	Olaria	22	4	9	9	16	19	−3	17	
8	Botafogo	22	5	6	11	14	22	−8	16	
9	Goytacaz	22	3	9	10	17	20	−3	15	
10	Portuguesa	22	4	6	12	11	33	−22	14	
11	Bonsucesso	22	5	3	14	13	43	−30	13	Relegated
12	Volta Redonda	22	3	6	13	18	40	−22	12	Relegated

Updated to match(es) played on December 1, 1985. Source: RSSSF.com
Rules for classification: 1) points; 2) wins; 3) goal difference; 4) number of goals scored.

=== Finals ===
Pos	Team	Pld	W	D	L	GF	GA	GD	Pts	Qualification or relegation
1	Fluminense	2	1	1	0	3	2	+1	3	Champions
2	Bangu	2	1	0	1	3	3	0	2	
3	Flamengo	2	0	1	1	2	3	−1	1	

Updated to match(es) played on December 18, 1985. Source: RSSSF.com
Rules for classification: 1) points; 2) wins; 3) goal difference; 4) number of goals scored.
