= Taça Guanabara =

Football tournament

- Organiser(s): Rio de Janeiro State Football Federation
- Founded: 1965
- Region: Rio de Janeiro state
- Teams: 12
- Qualifier for: Campeonato Carioca
- Current champions: Fluminense (13th title)
- Most championships: Flamengo (25 titles)

The Taça Guanabara (English: Guanabara Cup) is an annual football tournament attached to the Campeonato Carioca, the state football league in the Rio de Janeiro state. It has been organized since 1965 by the Rio de Janeiro State Football Federation. It has had different formats throughout its history.

In its first seven editions (1965, 1966, 1967, 1968, 1969, 1970 and 1971), the Taça Guanabara was a tournament in its own right, unrelated to the Campeonato Carioca, and the winner would represent Rio de Janeiro in the Taça Brasil national league competition. From 1972 onward, the cup became the first round of the Campeonato Carioca. Since 2021, the Taça Guanarabara is the first single round-robin phase of the Campeonato Carioca.

The most successful team in the tournament's history is Flamengo, who have won 25 times.

== Format ==
The Taça Guanabara and the Taça Rio has become, throughout its history, recognized for the various changes in its format, causing confusion for many spectators.

Since 2021, the Taça Guanarabara is the first single round-robin phase of the Campeonato Carioca, played by 12 teams. The team that finishes with the most points is the champion. The four best teams advance to the final stage of the Campeonato Carioca, and the clubs that finished 5th to 8th places compete in the Taça Rio.

From 2026 onwards, it will divide the clubs into two groups of six each, with matches against the clubs in the other group, which will qualify the top four from each group for the next phase.

== History ==
The first season of the tournament was held in 1965. At the time, the tournament was considered a separate competition unrelated to the Campeonato Carioca. In its first years, its purpose was to define the Guanabara representative in the Taça Brasil, but it kept being played even after the Taça Brasil's last edition. In 1971, the tournament became the first stage of Campeonato Carioca but is still considered a separate competition to a certain extent, with a trophy awarded to the winner of the tournament.

The current format has been used throughout the tournament's history with the exception of the 1994 and 1995 editions.

In 1994, twelve teams were divided into two groups (similar to the current format). However, in the group stage, teams not only played against teams from their same group, but also played against the teams from the other group in the second phase of the group stage (similar to the Taça Rio format). After the group stage, the first placed team in each group faced each other in the Taça Guanabara final. Semi-finals were not played. The Taça Guanabara final results had no bearing on the Campeonato Carioca. The two highest placed teams of each Taça Guanabara group entered the final phase of Campeonato Carioca. Those four teams played a double round-robin tournament to contest the Campeonato Carioca championship.

In 1995, the number of teams increased to 16 while the format remained similar to 1994: two groups of 8 teams contested two group stage phases. After the group stage, the top team of each group competed in the Taça Guanabara final, with the winner being awarded one point in the final phase of Campeonato Carioca. The first placed team in each group after the first and second phase of the group stage also received one extra point for a total of five "bonus" points contributed towards teams in the Campeonato Carioca. The top four teams in each group then contested the final phase of Campeonato Carioca in a double round-robin tournament to determine the winner of Campeonato Carioca. Because of these format changes, Taça Rio was not held in these three years. Since 1996, the old format has been adopted again.

== Finalists ==
Year	Champions	Runners-up
1965	Vasco da Gama (1)	Botafogo
1966	Fluminense (1)	Flamengo
1967	Botafogo (1)	America
1968	Botafogo (2)	Flamengo
1969	Fluminense (2)	Botafogo
1970	Flamengo (1)	Fluminense
1971	Fluminense (3)	Botafogo
1972	Flamengo (2)	Fluminense
1973	Flamengo (3)	Vasco da Gama
1974	America (1)	Fluminense
1975	Fluminense (4)	America
1976	Vasco da Gama (2)	Flamengo
1977	Vasco da Gama (3)	Flamengo
1978	Flamengo (4)	Fluminense
1979	Flamengo (5)	Fluminense
1980	Flamengo (6)	Americano
1981	Flamengo (7)	America
1982	Flamengo (8)	Vasco da Gama
1983	Fluminense (5)	America
1984	Flamengo (9)	Fluminense
1985	Fluminense (6)	Vasco da Gama
1986	Vasco da Gama (4)	Flamengo
1987	Vasco da Gama (5)	Fluminense
1988	Flamengo (10)	Botafogo
1989	Flamengo (11)	Botafogo
1990	Vasco da Gama (6)	Botafogo
1991	Fluminense (7)	Flamengo
1992	Vasco da Gama (7)	Flamengo
1993	Fluminense (8)	Vasco da Gama
1994	Vasco da Gama (8)	Fluminense
1995	Flamengo (12)	Botafogo
1996	Flamengo (13)	Vasco da Gama
1997	Botafogo (3)	Vasco da Gama
1998	Vasco da Gama (9)	Flamengo
1999	Flamengo (14)	Vasco da Gama
2000	Vasco da Gama (10)	Botafogo
2001	Flamengo (15)	Fluminense
2002	Americano (1)	Vasco da Gama
2003	Vasco da Gama (11)	Flamengo
2004	Flamengo (16)	Fluminense
2005	Volta Redonda (1)	Americano
2006	Botafogo (4)	America
2007	Flamengo (17)	Madureira
2008	Flamengo (18)	Botafogo
2009	Botafogo (5)	Resende
2010	Botafogo (6)	Vasco da Gama
2011	Flamengo (19)	Boavista
2012	Fluminense (9)	Vasco da Gama
2013	Botafogo (7)	Vasco da Gama
2014	Flamengo (20)	Fluminense
2015	Botafogo (8)	Flamengo
2016	Vasco da Gama (12)	Fluminense
2017	Fluminense (10)	Flamengo
2018	Flamengo (21)	Boavista
2019	Vasco da Gama (13)	Fluminense
2020	Flamengo (22)	Boavista
2021	Flamengo (23)	Volta Redonda
2022	Fluminense (11)	Flamengo
2023	Fluminense (12)	Vasco da Gama
2024	Flamengo (24)	Nova Iguaçu
2025	Flamengo (25)	Volta Redonda
2026	Fluminense (13)	Vasco da Gama

== Titles by club ==
- Flamengo 25 titles
- Fluminense 13 titles
- Vasco da Gama 13 titles
- Botafogo 8 titles
- América 1 title
- Americano 1 title
- Volta Redonda 1 title

== Broadcasting rights ==
=== Brazil ===
Broadcaster	Free/Pay
RecordTV	Free
Cariocão TV	PPV

== Statistics ==
Since 1990, the winner of the Taça Guanabara has also won the State championship in 1992, 1994, 1997, 1998, 1999, 2001, 2003, 2004, 2006, 2007, 2008, 2010, 2011, 2012, 2013, 2014, 2016, 2020, 2021, 2022, and 2023.

== See also ==
- Campeonato Carioca
- Taça Rio
