= 1987 Campeonato Carioca =

Campeonato Carioca
- Season: 1987
- Champions: Vasco da Gama
- Relegated: Campo Grande; Mesquita; Olaria; Portuguesa
- Matches played: 191
- Top goalscorer: Romário (Vasco da Gama) - 16 goals
- Biggest home win: Flamengo 5-0 Campo Grande (April 1, 1987)
- Biggest away win: AA Cabofriense 0-6 Vasco da Gama (April 29, 1987); Mesquita 0-6 Vasco da Gama (May 6, 1987)
- Highest scoring: AA Cabofriense 2-5 Bangu (April 1, 1987)

The 1987 edition of the Campeonato Carioca kicked off on February 8, 1987 and ended on August 9, 1987. It is the official tournament organized by FFERJ (Federação de Futebol do Estado do Rio de Janeiro, or Rio de Janeiro State Football Federation. Only clubs based in the Rio de Janeiro State are allowed to play. Fourteen teams contested this edition. Vasco da Gama won the title for the 16th time. Campo Grande, Mesquita, Olaria and Portuguesa were relegated.

== System ==
The tournament would be divided in four stages:

- Taça Guanabara: The fourteen teams all played in a single round-robin format against each other. The champions qualified to the Final phase.
- Taça Rio: The fourteen teams all played in a single round-robin format against each other. The champions qualified to the Final phase and the four best teams qualified to the Third round.
- Third round: The remaining four teams all played in a single round-robin format against each other. The champions qualified to the Final phase.
- Final phase: The champions of each of the three stages would play that phase. each team played in a single round-robin format against each other and the team with the most points won the title.

== Championship ==
=== Taça Guanabara ===
Pos	Team	Pld	W	D	L	GF	GA	GD	Pts	Qualification or relegation
1	Vasco da Gama	13	8	4	1	24	6	+18	20	Qualified to Final phase
2	Fluminense	13	7	5	1	15	5	+10	19	
3	Goytacaz	13	7	3	3	16	13	+3	17	
4	Botafogo	13	6	5	2	11	7	+4	17	
5	Flamengo	13	5	6	2	15	5	+10	16	
6	Bangu	13	5	5	3	17	12	+5	15	
7	Americano	13	4	7	2	12	8	+4	15	
8	Campo Grande	13	4	5	4	13	19	−6	13	
9	América	13	2	6	5	6	11	−5	10	
10	Porto Alegre	13	3	3	7	8	17	−9	9	
11	Olaria	13	2	5	6	7	12	−5	9	
12	AA Cabofriense	13	2	4	7	10	19	−9	8	
13	Mesquita	13	0	8	5	6	13	−7	8	
14	Portuguesa	13	0	6	7	5	18	−13	6	

Updated to match(es) played on April 21, 1987. Source: RSSSF.com
Rules for classification: 1) points; 2) wins; 3) goal difference; 4) number of goals scored.

=== Taça Rio ===
Pos	Team	Pld	W	D	L	GF	GA	GD	Pts	Qualification or relegation
1	Bangu	13	10	3	0	21	4	+17	23	Qualified to Final phase
2	Vasco da Gama	13	8	4	1	29	7	+22	20	
3	Flamengo	13	8	4	1	18	8	+10	20	
4	Fluminense	13	7	5	1	14	7	+7	19	
5	Americano	13	7	1	5	13	9	+4	15	
6	Goytacaz	13	4	4	5	13	12	+1	12	
7	AA Cabofriense	13	4	4	5	13	20	−7	12	
8	América	13	3	6	4	13	12	+1	12	
9	Porto Alegre	13	3	5	5	11	11	0	11	
10	Botafogo	13	3	5	5	9	11	−2	11	
11	Olaria	13	3	5	5	9	14	−5	11	
12	Mesquita	13	2	4	7	6	21	−15	8	
13	Campo Grande	13	2	1	10	5	17	−12	5	
14	Portuguesa	13	1	1	11	11	32	−21	3	

Updated to match(es) played on June 27, 1987. Source: RSSSF.com
Rules for classification: 1) points; 2) wins; 3) goal difference; 4) number of goals scored.

=== Aggregate table ===
Pos	Team	Pld	W	D	L	GF	GA	GD	Pts	Qualification or relegation
1	Vasco da Gama	26	16	8	2	53	13	+40	40	Qualified to Third round
2	Bangu	26	15	8	3	38	16	+22	38	Qualified to Third round
3	Fluminense	26	14	10	2	29	12	+17	38	Qualified to Third round
4	Flamengo	26	13	10	3	33	13	+20	36	Qualified to Third round
5	Americano	26	11	8	7	25	17	+8	30	
6	Goytacaz	26	11	7	8	29	25	+4	29	
7	Botafogo	26	9	10	7	20	18	+2	28	
8	América	26	5	12	9	19	23	−4	22	
9	Porto Alegre	26	6	8	12	19	28	−9	20	
10	AA Cabofriense	26	6	8	12	23	39	−16	20	
11	Olaria	26	5	10	11	16	26	−10	20	Relegated
12	Campo Grande	26	6	6	14	18	36	−18	18	Relegated
13	Mesquita	26	2	12	12	12	34	−22	16	Relegated
14	Portuguesa	26	1	7	18	16	50	−34	9	Relegated

Updated to match(es) played on June 27, 1987. Source: RSSSF.com
Rules for classification: 1) points; 2) wins; 3) goal difference; 4) number of goals scored.

=== Third phase ===
Pos	Team	Pld	W	D	L	GF	GA	GD	Pts	Qualification or relegation
1	Flamengo	3	1	2	0	3	2	+1	4	Qualified to Final phase
2	Vasco da Gama	3	1	1	1	3	2	+1	3	
3	Bangu	3	0	2	1	3	6	−3	2	
4	Fluminense	3	1	1	1	3	2	+1	−2 (Note: Fluminense lost five points for using a ineligible player)	

Updated to match(es) played on July 27, 1987. Source: RSSSF.com
Rules for classification: 1) points; 2) wins; 3) goal difference; 4) number of goals scored.

=== Final phase ===
Pos	Team	Pld	W	D	L	GF	GA	GD	Pts	Qualification or relegation
1	Vasco da Gama	2	2	0	0	5	0	+5	4	Champions
2	Flamengo	2	1	0	1	1	1	0	2	
3	Bangu	2	0	0	2	0	5	−5	0	

Updated to match(es) played on August 9, 1987. Source: RSSSF.com
Rules for classification: 1) points; 2) wins; 3) goal difference; 4) number of goals scored.
