= 1988 Campeonato Carioca =

Campeonato Carioca
- Season: 1988
- Champions: Vasco da Gama
- Relegated: Friburguense; Goytacaz
- Copa do Brasil: Vasco da Gama; Flamengo
- Série C: AA Cabofriense; Porto Alegre; Volta Redonda
- Matches played: 140
- Goals scored: 296 (2.11 per match)
- Top goalscorer: Bebeto (Flamengo) - 17 goals
- Biggest home win: Flamengo 6-0 Goytacaz (May 28, 1988)
- Biggest away win: Americano 1-5 Fluminense (May 1, 1988)
- Highest scoring: Vasco da Gama 4-3 Botafogo (March 28, 1988)

The 1988 edition of the Campeonato Carioca kicked off on January 30, 1988, and ended on June 22, 1988. It is the official tournament organized by FFERJ (Federação de Futebol do Estado do Rio de Janeiro, or Rio de Janeiro State Football Federation. Only clubs based in the Rio de Janeiro State are allowed to play. Twelve teams contested this edition. Vasco da Gama won the title for the 17th time. Friburguense and Goytacaz were relegated.

== System ==
The tournament would be divided in four stages:

- Taça Guanabara: The twelve teams all played in a single round-robin format against each other. The champions qualified to the Final phase.
- Taça Rio: The twelve teams all played in a single round-robin format against each other. The champions qualified to the Final phase and the four best teams qualified to the Third round.
- Third round: The remaining four teams all played in a single round-robin format against each other. The champions qualified to the Final phase.
- Final phase: The champions of each of the three stages would play that phase. if the same team won two of them, they would pay the other stage champion in two matches, with one bonus point.

== Championship ==
=== Taça Guanabara ===
Pos	Team	Pld	W	D	L	GF	GA	GD	Pts	Qualification or relegation
1	Flamengo	11	8	2	1	19	5	+14	18	Champions
2	Vasco da Gama	11	8	1	2	23	10	+13	17	
3	Fluminense	11	6	4	1	15	7	+8	16	
4	Americano	11	5	5	1	12	8	+4	15	
5	Bangu	11	3	6	2	11	8	+3	12	
6	Botafogo	11	3	5	3	14	12	+2	11	
7	Goytacaz	11	3	3	5	6	7	−1	9	
8	América	11	2	4	5	9	13	−4	8	
9	Porto Alegre	11	2	4	5	7	14	−7	8	
10	AA Cabofriense	11	2	3	6	8	18	−10	7	
11	Friburguense	11	1	4	6	5	16	−11	6	
12	Volta Redonda	11	1	3	7	3	14	−11	5	

Updated to match(es) played on March 28, 1988. Source: RSSSF.com
Rules for classification: 1) points; 2) wins; 3) goal difference; 4) number of goals scored.

=== Taça Rio ===
Pos	Team	Pld	W	D	L	GF	GA	GD	Pts	Qualification or relegation
1	Vasco da Gama	11	9	1	1	16	3	+13	19	Champions
2	Fluminense	11	7	3	1	23	6	+17	17	
3	Flamengo	11	6	4	1	18	3	+15	16	
4	Botafogo	11	5	4	2	17	12	+5	14	
5	Volta Redonda	11	3	6	2	9	10	−1	12	
6	Americano	11	3	5	3	7	10	−3	11	
7	AA Cabofriense	11	3	4	4	8	15	−7	10	
8	Porto Alegre	11	3	3	5	13	15	−2	9	
9	Bangu	11	3	3	5	9	11	−2	9	
10	América	11	2	3	6	9	18	−9	7	
11	Goytacaz	11	2	1	8	11	21	−10	5	
12	Friburguense	11	0	3	8	5	21	−16	3	

Updated to match(es) played on May 29, 1988. Source: RSSSF.com
Rules for classification: 1) points; 2) wins; 3) goal difference; 4) number of goals scored.

=== Aggregate table ===
Pos	Team	Pld	W	D	L	GF	GA	GD	Pts	Qualification or relegation
1	Vasco da Gama	22	17	2	3	39	13	+26	36	Qualified to Third round
2	Flamengo	22	14	6	2	37	8	+29	34	Qualified to Third round
3	Fluminense	22	13	7	2	38	13	+25	33	Qualified to Third round
4	Americano	22	8	10	4	19	18	+1	26	Qualified to Third round
5	Botafogo	22	8	9	5	31	24	+7	25	
6	Bangu	22	6	9	7	20	19	+1	21	
7	Porto Alegre	22	5	7	10	20	29	−9	17	
8	AA Cabofriense	22	5	7	10	16	33	−17	17	
9	Volta Redonda	22	4	9	9	12	24	−12	17	
10	América	22	4	7	11	18	31	−13	15	
11	Goytacaz	22	5	4	13	17	28	−11	14	Relegated
12	Friburguense	22	1	7	14	10	37	−27	9	Relegated

Updated to match(es) played on May 29, 1988. Source: RSSSF.com
Rules for classification: 1) points; 2) wins; 3) goal difference; 4) number of goals scored.

=== Third phase ===
Pos	Team	Pld	W	D	L	GF	GA	GD	Pts	Qualification or relegation
1	Vasco da Gama	3	2	1	0	5	2	+3	5	Qualified to Finals
2	Flamengo	3	1	1	1	4	3	+1	3	
3	Americano	3	1	0	2	3	6	−3	2	
4	Fluminense	3	0	2	1	3	4	−1	2	

Updated to match(es) played on June 12, 1988. Source: RSSSF.com
Rules for classification: 1) points; 2) wins; 3) goal difference; 4) number of goals scored.

=== Finals ===
Team 1	Agg.	Team 2	1st leg	2nd leg
Flamengo	1–3	Vasco da Gama	1–2	0–1
