= CR Vasco da Gama =

Brazilian football club

Vasco da Gama
- Full name: Club de Regatas Vasco da Gama
- Nicknames: Gigante da Colina (Giant of the Hill); Camisas Negras (Black Shirts); Cruzmaltino (Maltese Cross club); Legítimo Clube do Povo (True People's Club); Vascaínos or Cruzmaltinos (supporters)
- Founded: 21 August 1898; 128 years ago
- Ground: São Januário; Maracanã
- Capacity: 21,880; 78,838
- SAF owner: CR Vasco da Gama (69%); 777 Partners (31%)
- President: Pedrinho
- Head coach: Pedro Emanuel
- League: Campeonato Brasileiro Série A Campeonato Carioca
- 2025 2025: Série A, 14th of 20; Carioca, 4th of 12
- Website: vasco.com.br
Home colors	Away colors	Third colors

Club de Regatas Vasco da Gama (Portuguese pronunciation: [ˈklubi dʒi ʁeˈɡatɐz ˈvasku dɐ ˈɡɐ̃mɐ]; English: Vasco da Gama Club of Rowing), commonly referred to as Vasco da Gama or simply Vasco, is a sports club based in Rio de Janeiro, Brazil. It is mostly known for its men's football team, which currently competes in the Campeonato Brasileiro Série A, the top tier of the Brazilian football league system, and in the Campeonato Carioca, the state of Rio de Janeiro's premier state league.

Named after Vasco da Gama 400 years after his European–Indian sea route in 1498, the club was founded in 1898 as a rowing club by Brazilian workers, Portuguese Brazilians and newly arrived Portuguese immigrants. Vasco created its football department in 1915, with professionalism officially adopted in 1933 – pioneer in Brazil. In addition to its main departments of football and rowing, Vasco has other sports departments since the 1910s. Its youth academy, which has brought up international footballers such as Hilderaldo Bellini, Orlando Peçanha, Roberto Dinamite, Romário, Edmundo, Philippe Coutinho and Rayan, is well known for its socio-educational methodology.

The club is recognized as the first continental champion of the world, having won the South American Championship of Champions in 1948, on its 50th anniversary. They defeated Real Madrid, then European champions, in the 1957 Tournoi de Paris, considered by FIFA as "the most notable encounter between teams from two continents before 1960". They won the Copa Libertadores in 1998, on their 100th anniversary. At the national level, Vasco da Gama has won four Campeonato Brasileiro Série A titles, one Copa do Brasil title and three Torneio Rio–São Paulo titles. At the state level, the club has also won 24 Campeonato Carioca titles. The golden generation of Vasco da Gama is dubbed the Expresso da Vitória, and is considered by many to be one of the best football teams in the world in the 1940s and 50s, which included Moacir Barbosa, Ademir de Menezes, Albino Friaça, Danilo Alvim, Augusto da Costa, Chico, among others.

With fans worldwide, Vasco da Gama is one of the most widely supported clubs in Brazil, the state of Rio de Janeiro and the Americas. Vasco plays its home matches in São Januário since its inauguration in 1927. Occasionally, the club has also played their home matches in Maracanã since its inauguration in 1950. Vasco holds long-standings rivalries with Flamengo, Fluminense and Botafogo. The Vasco–Flamengo rivalry, known as Clássico dos Milhões (Derby of the Millions), is considered one of the main rivalries of Brazilian sports and one of the most prominent football rivalries in the world.

== History ==
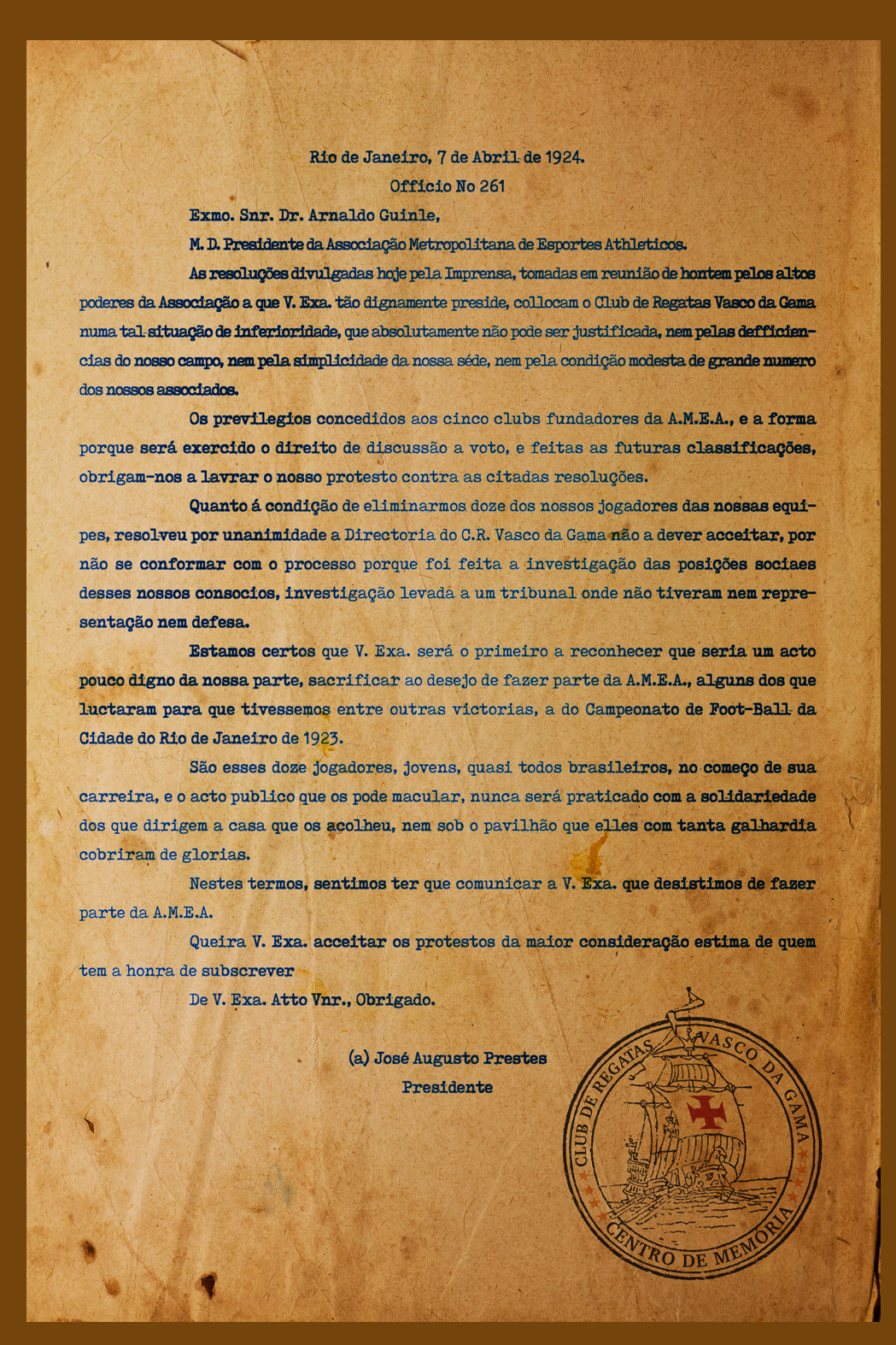
Resposta Histórica, a symbol of club anti-racist struggle.

The foundation of Vasco da Gama took place in the context of the popularization of rowing at the end of the 19th century. The idea to create a rowing club originated with four young Brazilians—Henrique M. Ferreira Monteiro, Luiz Antonio Rodrigues, José Alexandre d'Avellar Rodrigues, and Manoel Teixeira de Sousa Junior—all clerks working in downtown Rio de Janeiro. During their free time, the young men rented a rowboat named "Iracema" from the Grupo de Regatas Gragoatá in the city of Niterói. The distance between Rio de Janeiro and Niterói inspired the idea to establish a rowing club in the Saúde neighborhood, where they worked. A fifth member, Lopes de Freitas, was invited, and the initial meetings took place in January 1898. The idea of a new rowing club in the neighborhood was promoted in commercial circles, and the four founders quickly attracted new interested parties. Among those invited to the future institution were the Couto brothers, Portuguese merchants in the steam-powered sawmill business, who had the necessary capital to establish the club in its early stages. After several preliminary meetings, the club was founded on August 21, 1898, at Rua da Saúde, No. 293 (now No. 345, Rua Sacadura Cabral), (Note: "Rua da Saúde" no longer exists. The address of Rua Sacadura Cabral, nº 345, is provided by research by Henrique Hübner, former Director of the Centro de Memória do Vasco. See the main text for further reference.) with 62 founding members of the institution. The name chosen for the club — Vasco da Gama — was in honor of the IV centenary of the discovery of the maritime route to India by Portuguese explorer Vasco da Gama, as many of the founders were Portuguese. Vasco da Gama incorporated the Lusitânia Sport Club football team in 1915 and officially entered football competition the following year, embracing an inclusive identity that welcomed players regardless of race, social class or origin. Competing initially in the third division of Rio de Janeiro, the club steadily strengthened its squad with Black, mixed-race, Portuguese and working-class white players, in contrast to the exclusivity seen in many elite clubs of the period. After winning the second division title in 1922 with an impressive campaign, Vasco secured promotion to the top tier of Campeonato Carioca. In 1923, defying expectations, the team won the first-division championship in its debut season, defeating leading clubs such as America, Fluminense and Flamengo. This historic achievement — led by the legendary Camisas Negras (Black Shirts) — represented a major social milestone in Brazilian sport, marking the first time a team composed largely of Afro-descendant and poor players conquered a major title against the city’s traditional elite. The significance of this moment continues to resonate today, with the Camisas Negras recognized nationally, including their place in Livro dos Heróis da Pátria (Book of Heroes of the Fatherland) of Tancredo Neves Pantheon of the Fatherland and Freedom.

After attempts to prevent Vasco da Gama from entering the competition, clubs from the south zone (elite area of the city of Rio de Janeiro), America, Bangu, Botafogo, Flamengo, Fluminense and a few others joined, abandoned the Liga Metropolitana de Desportos Terrestres (LMDT) and founded the Associação Metropolitana de Esportes Atléticos (AMEA), leaving out Vasco, which could only join the new entity if it dismissed twelve of its athletes (all black) on the grounds that they had a "dubious profession". Faced with the imposed situation, in 1924, the president of the CR Vasco da Gama, José Augusto Prestes, envied a letter to AMEA, which came to be known as the "Resposta Histórica" (Historical Response), refusing to submit to the imposed condition and withdrawing from membership in the AMEA. The letter went down in history as a milestone in the fight against racism in football. In this way, in 1924, two championships were played in parallel, the LMDT being won undefeated by Vasco, thus winning the second state championship. The following year, the club overcame the resistance of the AMEA, managed to join the entity and again competed in the championship against the great teams under the condition of playing their games in the Andarahy Athletico Club field. Despite this, Vasco decided to build its own stadium, to end any demand. The place chosen for the construction was the São Januário farm, which had been a gift from Dom Pedro I to the Marchioness of Santos. On April 21, 1927, Vasco da Gama inaugurated the São Januário stadium, the largest stadium in the Americas until 1930, when the Estadio Centenario was inaugurated in Montevideo (for the first World Cup). Until 1940, when Pacaembu was inaugurated in São Paulo, the stadium was the largest in Brazil, and until 1950, when Maracanã was inaugurated, it was the largest in Rio de Janeiro. The stadium was built in ten months and with money raised through the "Campanha dos dez mil sócios" (Campaign of the Ten Thousand members) which received donations from fans across the city. Two years later, its lighting would be inaugurated, becoming the only club in the country with a stadium capable of hosting night games.

In 1942, the club lived an uncomfortable fast of 5 years without any title in the city of Rio de Janeiro. Trying to reverse this situation, the Vasco da Gama's president Cyro Aranha adopted a long-term policy based on hiring young players. The team, which would later become known as Expresso da Vitória (Victory Express), was composed of the goalkeeper Moacir Barbosa, forwards Ademir de Menezes and Chico, midfielder Danilo Alvim, defender Augusto da Costa, among others. This generation of players, commanded mainly by Uruguayan coach Ondino Viera, was one of the first Brazilian teams to use the 4–2–4 tactical scheme, which strongly influenced Brazilian and Uruguayan football in the 1950s. The Expresso da Vitória won eighteen titles in ten years, including five state championships (three undefeated) and the South American Championship of Champions over River Plate in 1948, making Vasco the first Brazilian team (either club or national team) to win an international title outside Brazil. Later, Vasco was recognized by CONMEBOL as the 1948 continental champion and this competition was recognized as a precursor to the Copa Libertadores. This caused Vasco to be invited to the 1997 Supercopa Libertadores, a tournament only for clubs that had already been champions of the Copa Libertadores (Vasco would only win its first Copa Libertadores the following year, in 1998).

In the early 50s, many players from Expresso da Vitória had already left, and the team had new players, including the defenders Hilderaldo Bellini and Orlando Peçanha, forward Vavá, and the midfielders Sabará and Pinga. At the beginning of 1953, Vasco won the Quadrangular Internacional do Rio de Janeiro, a tournament it played against its rival Flamengo and Argentine teams Boca Juniors and Racing. Months later, won the Torneo Internacional de Chile against Colombian Millonarios and Chilean Colo-Colo. In July, the team won the Torneio Octogonal Rivadavia Corrêa Meyer, a tournament between Brazilian and European clubs. In 1956, Ademir de Menezes left Vasco. After winning the 1956 Campeonato Carioca, Vasco went on a tour of South America and Europe, and was called "the best South American team" by European newspapers. Vasco was chosen to participate in the 1957 Tournoi de Paris, in which they beat European champions Real Madrid in the final 4–3 in front of more than 65,000 spectators. This was the first time that a South American champion and a European champion faced each other (Vasco for the 1948 South American Championship and Real Madrid for the 1955–56 European Cup). The newspaper France-Soir stated after the tournament: "Real Madrid is not the greatest team in the world. Talk to Vasco da Gama about that", and the Jornal dos Sports cited Vasco as "world champions". In 2023, FIFA recognized as "the most notable meeting between teams from two continents meeting before 1960".

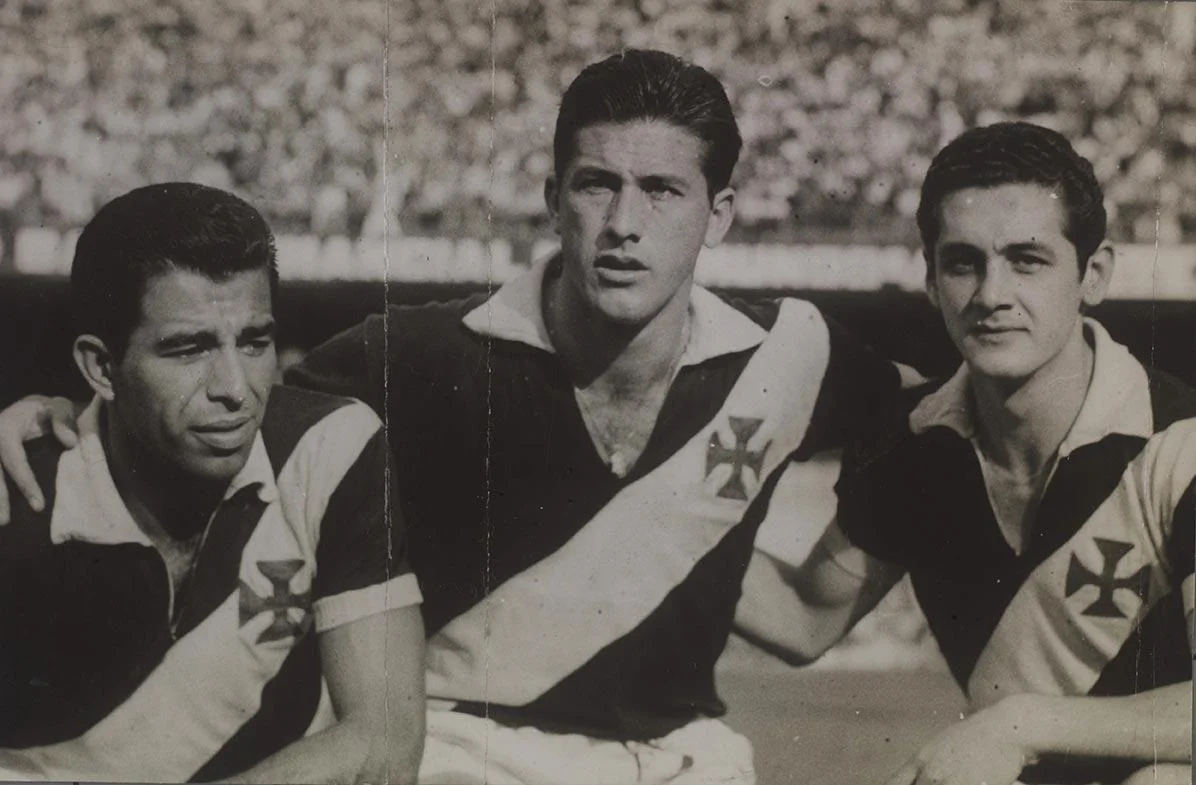
From left to right: Vavá, Bellini and Orlando, champions of the 1958 FIFA World Cup for Brazil national team. (Note: Bellini was the captain of the Brazil national team, while Vavá was Brazil's second-highest scorer in the tournament with 5 goals, behind Pelé with 6. The two also won the 1962 FIFA World Cup.)

In 1971, young Roberto Dinamite rose from Vasco's academy to the professional team. Roberto Dinamite would be instrumental in leading the team in winning the 1974 Campeonato Brasileiro Série A, Vasco da Gama's first national title, in which he finished as the tournament's top scorer with 16 goals. This achievement qualified Vasco to compete in their first Copa Libertadores in 1975, in which they did not have a good campaign. Roberto also helped Vasco win the 1977 Campeonato Carioca, beating Zico's Flamengo in a final playoff match. There a rivalry between Roberto and Zico would begin on the field, although off the field they were very friends. In 1978, Vasco fell in the semi-finals of the 1978 Campeonato Brasileiro Série A, but Paulinho would have finished as the tournament's top scorer with 19 goals. That year, the famous song by the Vasco fans emerged that "Vasco é o time da virada, Vasco é o time do amor" (Vasco is the team of the turnaround, Vasco is the team of love), inspired by a Beija-Flor samba. The song would be copied by other fans, such as Santos, Palmeiras and Atlético Mineiro.

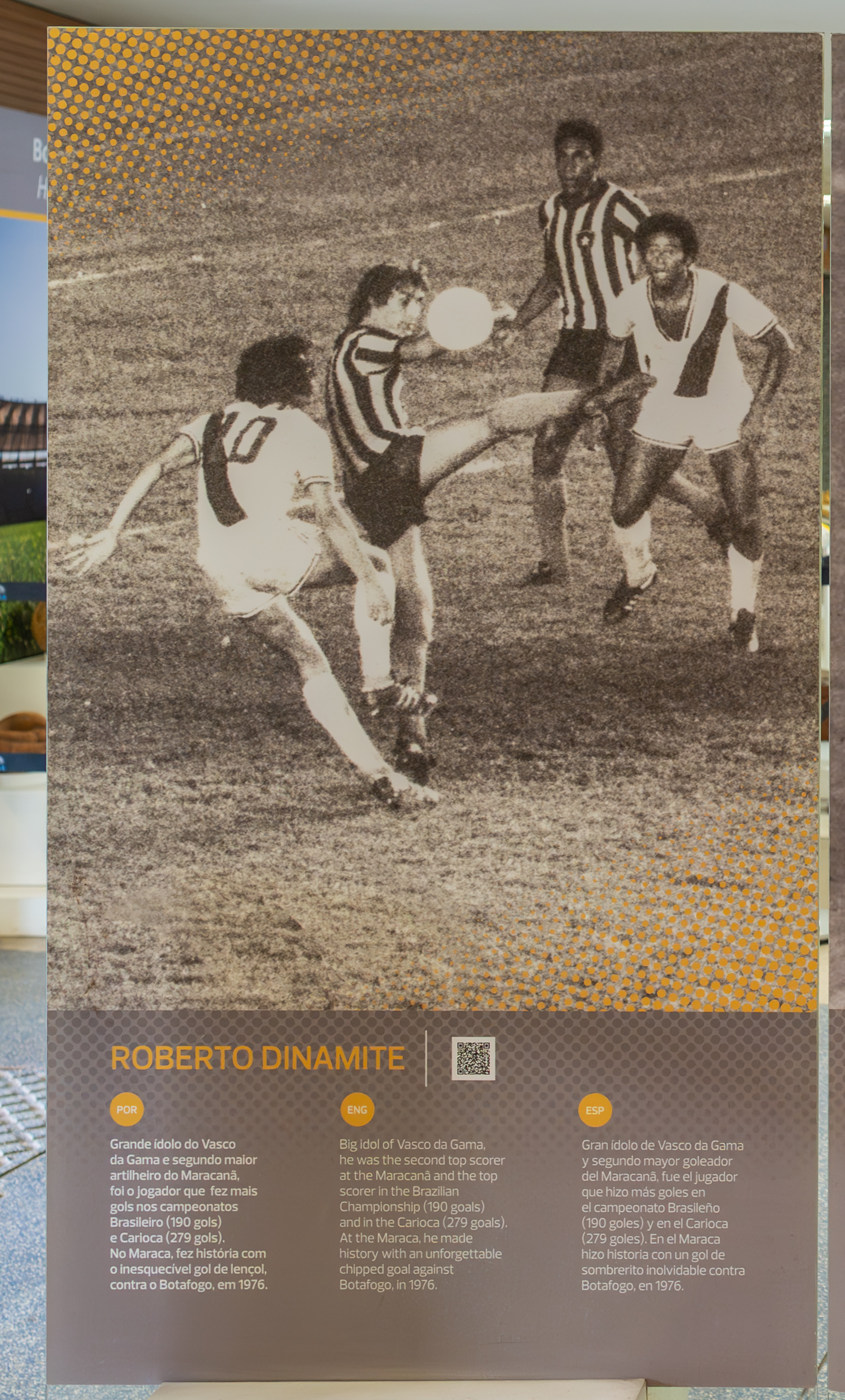
Mural in honor of Roberto Dinamite on the Walk of Fame, Maracanã Stadium.

In 1982, Vasco would win the Campeonato Carioca again, with coach Antônio Lopes removing seven starters players from the team in the final due to lack of commitment. In this tournament, Roberto scored the 500th goal of his career. Vasco lost the 1984 Campeonato Brasileiro Série A final to its rival Fluminense. In the next year, Romário made his debut, another youth player who would go on to be successful in the professional team. Romário began to form an attacking partnership with Roberto Dinamite, named by fans as "Ro-Ro". Roberto said he had to change his playing style, moving from playing as a center forward to being a second striker who helped Romário score goals, since he was getting older and Romário was younger and faster. Roberto Dinamite was top scorer of the 1985 Campeonato Carioca with 12 goals, and Romário was second with 11. Afterwards, Romário would be the top scorer in the 1986 and 1987 editions, with Roberto second in both, this last edition won by Vasco da Gama, in addition to also winning the 1988 edition. At the end of 1988, Romário was sold to PSV Eindhoven from Netherlands, being at the time the most expensive Brazilian signing by a foreign club.

In the 1989 Campeonato Brasileiro Série A, Roberto Dinamite had lost space in the team and was loaned to Portuguesa. Roberto played against Vasco during the championship, in a game that ended 0–0, in which he says he "wouldn't like to have that afternoon". Vasco remade the squad, signing a series of nationally renowned players, becoming known as SeleVasco (in reference to the word "seleção", used in Portuguese to designate a national team), as the team was considered a true national team. The big highlight was the player Bebeto, hired precisely from the great rival, Flamengo. Vasco defeated São Paulo in the final 1–0, with a goal from Sorato, and became two-time Brazilian champion.

The 1990s began with the victory of three consecutive Campeonato Carioca in 1992, 1993 and 1994. These achievements were important for Vasco as he was the only one among the Rio de Janeiro's Big Four who had not yet achieved the feat. In the 1997 Campeonato Brasileiro Série A, the club would win its third national league title, with a team led by the competition's then top scorer Edmundo, with 29 goals, the historical record of the tournament before the era of round-robin system. Edmundo became known to the fans as "O Animal" (The Animal) and the team as "Esquadrão Imortal" (Immortal Squad), which also included Juninho Pernambucano, Felipe, Pedrinho, Mauro Galvão, goalkeeper Carlos Germano, among others. In 1998, in the club's centenary year, Eurico Miranda signed the largest contract in the history of Brazilian football at the time between Vasco and NationsBank (currently Bank of America), in which the latter would exploit the club's brand. This contract allowed Vasco to have one of the most expensive squads in Brazilian football. The team won the Campeonato Carioca, as well as its first Copa Libertadores, defeating Barcelona SC in the final 4–1 on aggregate. The joy of the centenary was not complete only because of the losses to Real Madrid in the 1998 Intercontinental Cup and D.C. United in the 1998 Interamerican Cup. In 1999, Vasco won its third Torneio Rio–São Paulo title.

At the end of the decade, in 2000, Romário would return to play for Vasco after a spell at arch-rivals Flamengo. The team participated in the 2000 FIFA Club World Championship, placing first in its group in the group stage, ahead of Manchester United, Necaxa and South Melbourne, but was eliminated in the penalty shootout in the final against Corinthians. In the 2000 Copa Mercosur, in a final game that became known as "A Virada do Século" (The Turn of the Century), as Vasco reversed a 0–3 score in the first half to 4–3 against Palmeiras, with Romário's hat-trick. The team also won its fourth national title, the 2000 Campeonato Brasileiro Série A, in a final against São Caetano. During the second leg in the final, held at São Januário, the stadium fence collapsed, but no one was injured. The teams were ready to restart the match; however, Governor Anthony Garotinho intervened and ordered the match canceled. The following day, TV Globo ran a report distorting the incident, highlighting Eurico Miranda ejecting injured players from the field and calling for the match to restart immediately after the accident, which never happened. In 2023, in the documentary A Mão do Eurico, TV Globo admitted it "made a mistake" regarding the footage in the report. In the rescheduled match at Maracanã, Eurico printed the logo of SBT (TV Globo's rival network) on Vasco's shirt. Globo management, taken by surprise, was enraged. The entire game was broadcast this way on Globo, with Vasco winning the championship. From then on, tensions between Eurico and the network grew, which would affect the club in the following years. Globo decided to apply a financial tourniquet to the club, blocking TV subscriptions for 18 months.

Vasco already had one of the highest payrolls in world football and was successful in several sports, including basketball and futsal. At the 2000 Summer Olympics, Vasco had its largest delegation of athletes—at least 175—and was responsible for more medals than Brazil team itself, making it the most represented Brazilian club in the competition. Playing in multiple sports was part of Eurico Miranda's strategy to strengthen the Vasco brand. The club spent about 25% of its budget on Olympic sports. Additionally, during this period, the club purchased approximately 14,000 m² of land around São Januário for future stadium renovation and expansion. In November 2000, with the support of then president Antônio Soares Calçada, Eurico Miranda was elected president of the club for the first time in its history. During his first term, Eurico faced a severe financial crisis, particularly due to the break with Bank of America. The North American bank breached its contract with Vasco da Gama and failed to invest US$12 million in late 2000. Vasco then took legal action to break the agreement and won the case against the bank. However, the high payroll could not be maintained, and part of the team was dismantled in 2001. In 2008, Vasco was relegated to Campeonato Brasileiro Série B, for the first time in the club's history. The fall happened after a 2–0 defeat to EC Vitória, in Rio de Janeiro, in the last matchday of the league. Vasco won the 2009 Campeonato Brasileiro Série B and return to compete in the first division again in 2010. That year, 2009, 16-year-old Philippe Coutinho made his professional debut, which helped the team win the competition.

Vasco's 2010s began looking like things would improve for the club, with them winning the 2011 Copa do Brasil, defeating Coritiba in the final. The team also finished as runner-up in the 2011 Campeonato Brasileiro Série A, behind Corinthians. Many fans and players from that team contested the match against Flamengo on the last matchday of that year which, according to them, had crucial refereeing errors that denied Vasco the title. A while later, the referee of that match, Péricles Bassols, admitted his mistakes when refereeing the game. In 2013 season, the club had been relegated for the second time in their history to Campeonato Brasileiro Série B, which was secured with a 5–1 defeat to Atletico Paranaense on the final matchday. After one season in the Série B during 2014, Vasco gained promotion and in May 2015 won the Campeonato Carioca after a 12-year hiatus. However, they were relegated again in the 2015 edition, placing eighteenth. In 2016, Vasco became back-to-back Campeonato Carioca champions and had a 34-match unbeaten streak, their longest in official games. Once again, they were promoted to first division after one season in second division. However, in the 2020 season, they were relegated for the fourth time and then failed to gain promotion during the 2021 season, placing tenth.

In 2022, Vasco da Gama adopted the SAF model to manage its football department. Under the presidency of Jorge Salgado, the club sold 70% of its shares to 777 Partners, a private investment firm based in Miami. At the end of the season, Vasco da Gama secured promotion to the 2023 Campeonato Brasileiro Série A. In November 2023, former club player Pedrinho was elected president of the association. In 2024, Vasco da Gama filed a precautionary legal action before the Rio de Janeiro State Court, alleging reckless management by 777 Partners and a risk of financial collapse of the SAF. The court granted a preliminary injunction suspending the contract and restoring to the club control over 39% of the shares previously held by 777 Partners. In February 2025, Vasco da Gama filed for recuperação judicial, a Brazilian legal process similar to Chapter 11 bankruptcy protection in the United States. In October 2026, former 777 Partners owner Josh Wander pleaded guilty to committing US$ 500 million in fraud.

== Identity ==
=== Crest and cross ===
The founding crest of CR Vasco da Gama, used since 1899, consists of a caravel in a round coat of arms. In 1903, the first modification occurred, when a black background and the club's initials were added, separated by six crosses pattée, encircling the crest. It was only in the 1920s that the crest in its current format was adopted, which has undergone slight modifications over time. The initials are engraved on it, forming the acronym "CRVG", and the caravel, an expression of Portuguese navigation, is represented. The cross, the club's supreme symbol and possessing a strong religious aspect, is stamped on the ship's sails, since the Military Order of Christ was both religious and warlike. The components are immersed in a black background, cut by a white diagonal stripe.

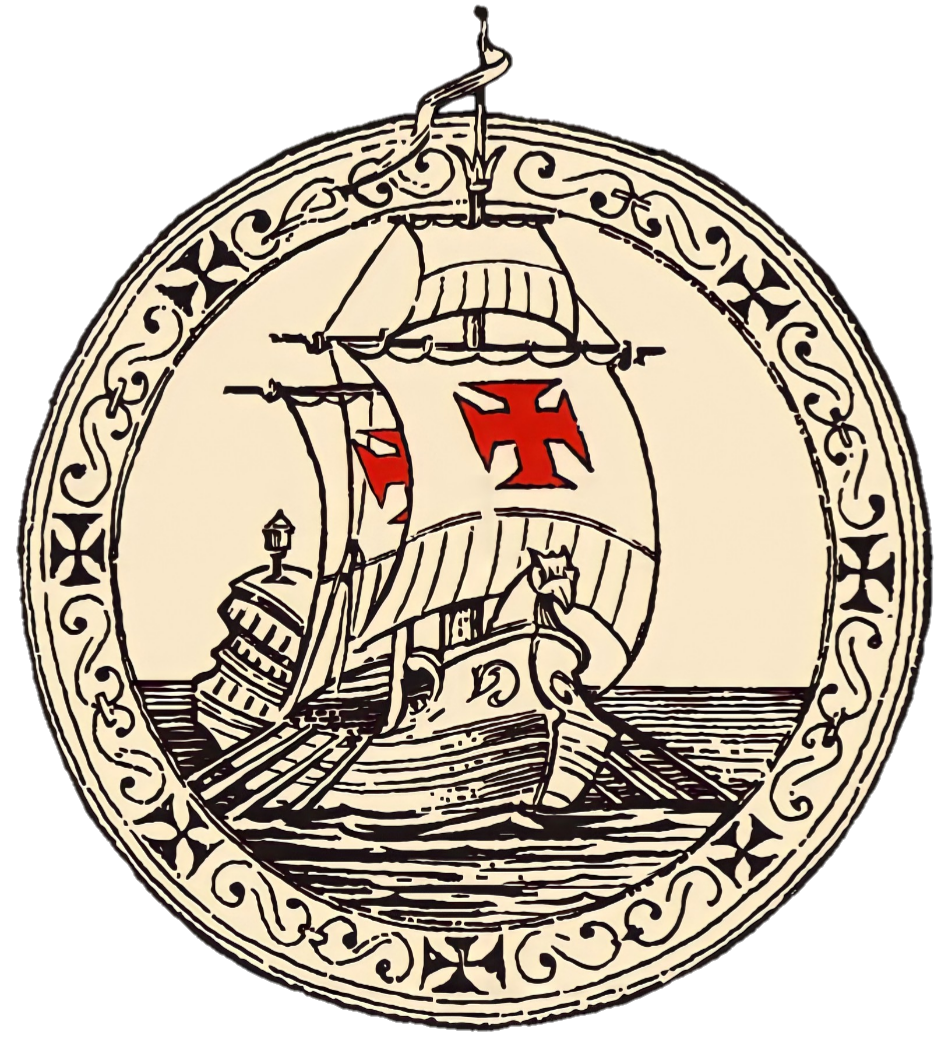
The first crest created in 1898.

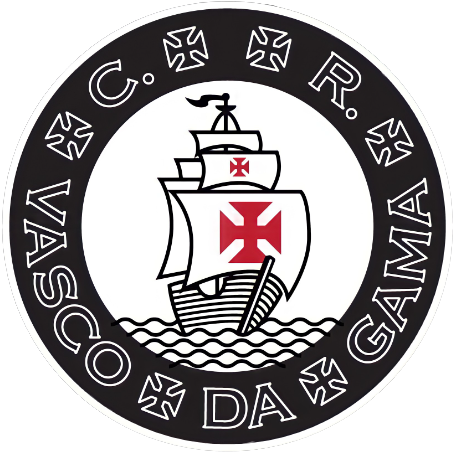
The first change of crest in 1903.

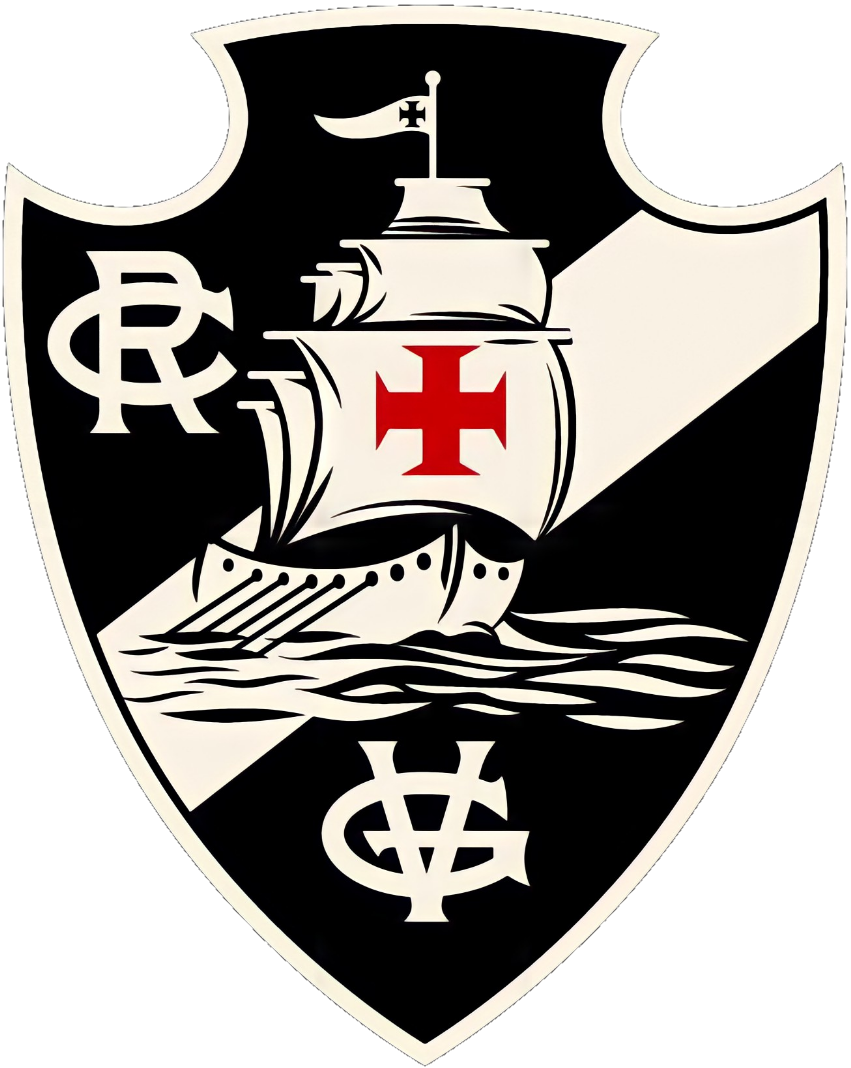
The current format was adopted in 1920.

Beyond the elements, the colors present in the CR Vasco da Gama crest also have strong meaning: black refers to the unknown seas of the East; while white represents the route discovered by Portuguese explorer Vasco da Gama. In addition, they reflect the idea of communion and equality between ethnicities, a value intensely defended by the club.

The cross currently featured on Vasco's uniforms and crest is called the cross pattée, although it is widely known by fans and the general public as the maltese cross. The explanation for this discrepancy lies in a foreign word used in Brazil – but not in Portugal: in English and French, all types of open crosses were erroneously called maltese crosses (or croix de malte in French). As can be seen in many displayed symbols, the club's original cross is the Order of Christ Cross. While the current uniform displays the maltese cross, characterized by the absence of intermediate lines, the Order of Christ Cross and similar versions have been widely used throughout history. Even so, Vasco's fans have popularly adopted the name maltese cross to designate the club's symbol, regardless of its historical accuracy.

Maltese cross, as it is called by supporters, although it was never used

Order of Christ Cross, sometimes used by the club

Cross pattée, sometimes used by the club in red

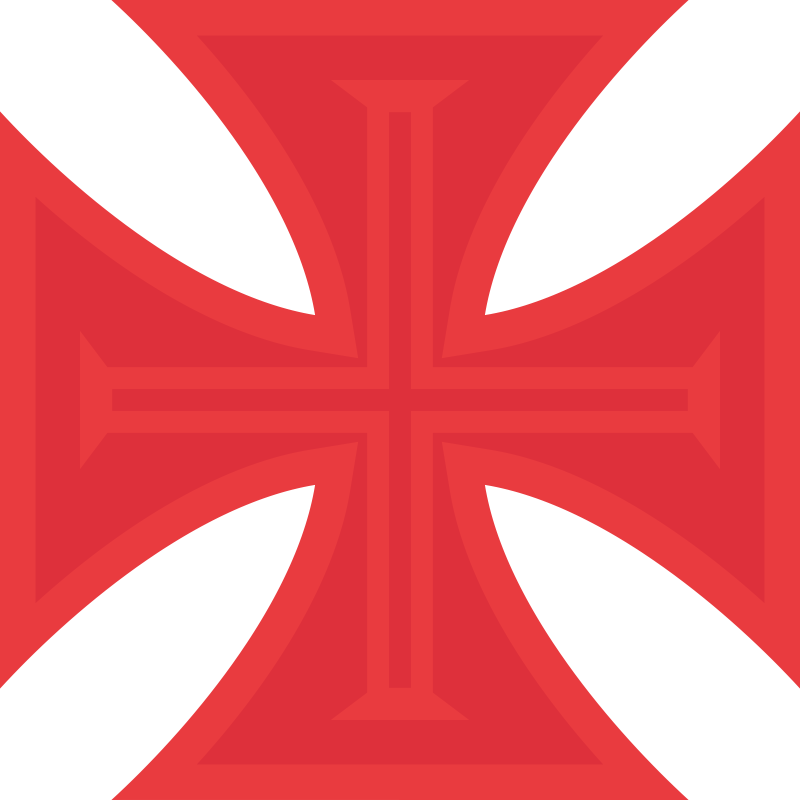
CR Vasco da Gama current cross, a mix between the two previous crosses

=== Kit evolution ===
Vasco da Gama has had several different uniforms throughout its history. The first shirt, used in rowing, was created in 1898 and was predominantly black, with a white diagonal stripe on the left (the reverse of the current shirt) and a cross in the center. The first football kit, created in 1916, was completely black, with a white collar and cuffs.

In 1938, the team used a white shirt with a black diagonal stripe on the right as its away kit for the first time. This shirt only returned in 1943 as the home kit, replacing the all-black shirt, along with the black shirt with a white diagonal stripe as the away kit. Over the years, Vasco has alternated its home and away kits between white and black. At least since the 2000s, the club's official statutes describe the black shirt as the home kit, although the club usually uses both variations when playing at home. In a brand manual published by the club in 2024, it was detailed that the home kit includes a black shirt, shorts, and socks, while the away kit has a white shirt, shorts, and socks.

1916–17 (Note: The first kit worn by the club in 1916.)	1918–24 (Note: The kit worn during the club's first footballing title win, which earned them the nickname Camisas Negras (Black Shirts).)	1933–44 (Note: The club continued to worn the all-black shirt until 1944.)	1938 (Note: The first white shirt with a black diagonal stripe was introduced in 1938 as the away kit, but returned as the home kit between 1943–53.)	1943–53 (Note: The club's traditional black shirt with a white diagonal stripe.)

=== Anthems ===
Vasco's official anthem was composed in 1918, by Joaquim Barros Ferreira da Silva, and it was the club's first anthem. There is another official anthem, created in the 1930s, called "Meu Pavilhão" (meaning My Pavilion), whose lyrics were composed by João de Freitas and music by Hernani Correia. This anthem replaced the previous one. The club's most popular anthem, however, is an unofficial anthem composed by Lamartine Babo in 1942.

=== Royal patronage ===
Since 2017, Vasco has been able to use the word Royal before its name, "Real Club de Regatas Vasco da Gama", through the Royal Decree of the Head of the Portuguese Royal House, Duarte Pio, Duke of Bragança, which renewed and conferred the Royal Patronage on Vasco da Gama. The royal title would be granted to the club in 1908, in its first decade of existence, on the occasion of the visit of the King Carlos I to Brazil, who had already decided to renew and confer the title of "Royal Society", which Vasco had already enjoyed during the period when Luís I was King of Portugal, but was prevented from doing so by the regicide of February 1, 1908.

== Stadium ==
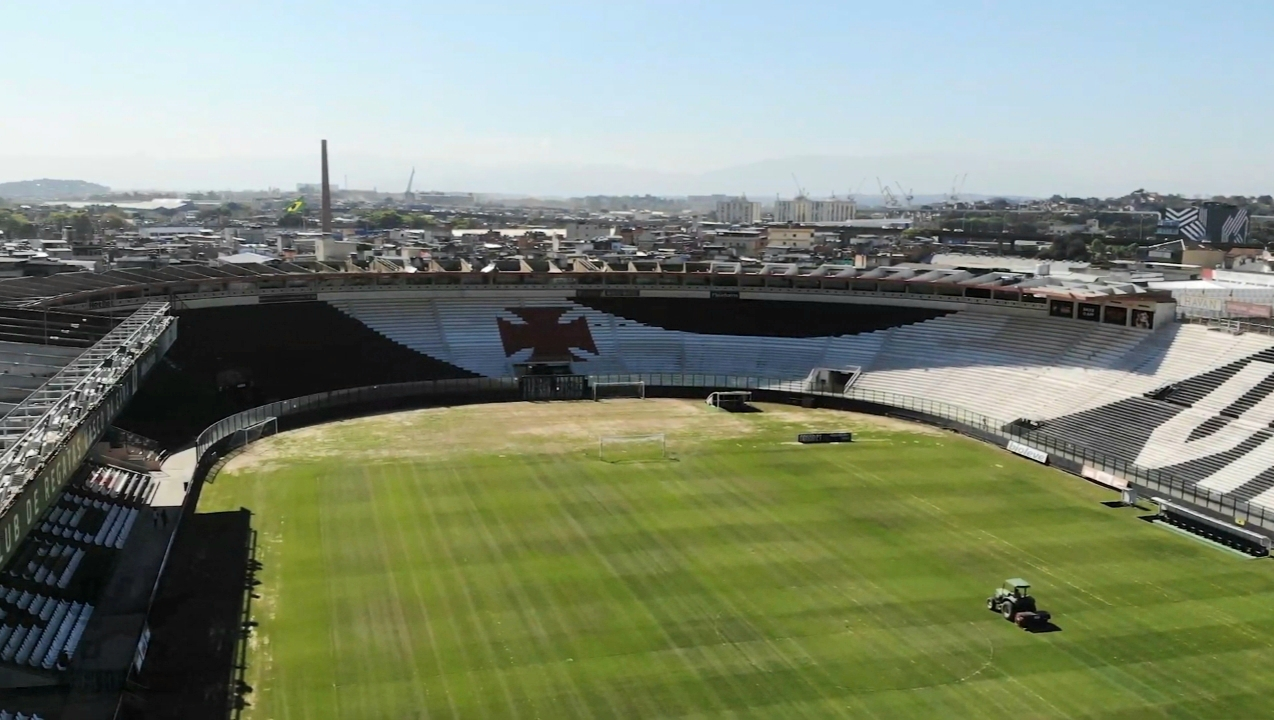
São Januário in 2020.

The Estádio Vasco da Gama, most known as São Januário, this is where the team plays most of its home games. It has a maximum capacity of 21,880 spectators. Occasionally, Vasco uses the 78,000-seater Maracanã for derbies or decisive matches.

Before the construction of São Januário, Vasco da Gama played its home matches at various rented or shared grounds throughout the city of Rio de Janeiro, including fields used during the early development of football in Brazil in the 1910s and 1920s. At the time, most Brazilian clubs did not possess privately owned stadiums, and Vasco’s growing popularity and sporting success created the need for a larger and more independent venue. The construction of São Januário, officially inaugurated in 1927, represented a major milestone in the club’s history. Built largely through financial contributions from supporters and members associated with the club, São Januário became the largest stadium in South America at the time of its inauguration. The stadium quickly established itself as a symbol of Vasco’s institutional strength and social identity, serving not only as a football venue but also as an important political and cultural space in Brazil throughout the 20th century.

With the increasing commercialization of Brazilian football and the expansion of national competitions, Vasco also began using larger stadiums for matches expected to attract larger crowds. During the second half of the 20th century, and especially following the construction of the Maracanã Stadium, Vasco frequently alternated between São Januário and the Maracanã depending on attendance expectations, tournament regulations, and logistical considerations. Important matches, derby fixtures, finals, and international games were often held at the Maracanã due to its greater capacity and infrastructure, while São Januário remained the symbolic and historical home of the club. By winning the 1950 Campeonato Carioca at the Maracanã, the club became the first to lift a trophy in the stadium.

In the contemporary era, the use of São Januário for major state derby matches became the subject of recurring debates involving public security concerns, stadium capacity, and administrative decisions by Rio de Janeiro football authorities. Vasco has frequently been prevented from hosting derby matches against Flamengo and Fluminense at São Januário, particularly in fixtures classified as high-risk by public security officials. As a result, many of these matches have been required to take place at the Maracanã, even when Vasco officially held home-field advantage. This situation became one of the most controversial issues among Vasco directors and supporters, who often argue that the club faces restrictions regarding its ability to fully exercise home advantage at its historic stadium.

== Supporters ==
According to census and polls, Vasco da Gama is the second most supported club in state of Rio de Janeiro, and varies between the third and fifth most supported club in Brazil, with an estimate of more than 15 million supporters in the country. Vasco fans are very diverse stretching across social class lines, however the core of most Vasco support lies within the working class of the Northern Zone of Rio de Janeiro and Rio outskirt cities. Vasco da Gama have significant support in other regions in Brazil, notably the Northeastern and North regions as well as strongholds in states of Espírito Santo, Santa Catarina, southern Minas Gerais and in the Distrito Federal. As of 29 June 2022, the club has 60,326 sócios in its membership program, having its peak in December 2019 with more than 178,000 memberships. In April 2023, CNN carried out a survey that revealed that Vasco is the team with the most fans considered "fanatics" in the Southeast Region clubs and among the Big Twelve, in addition to being the third in the country.

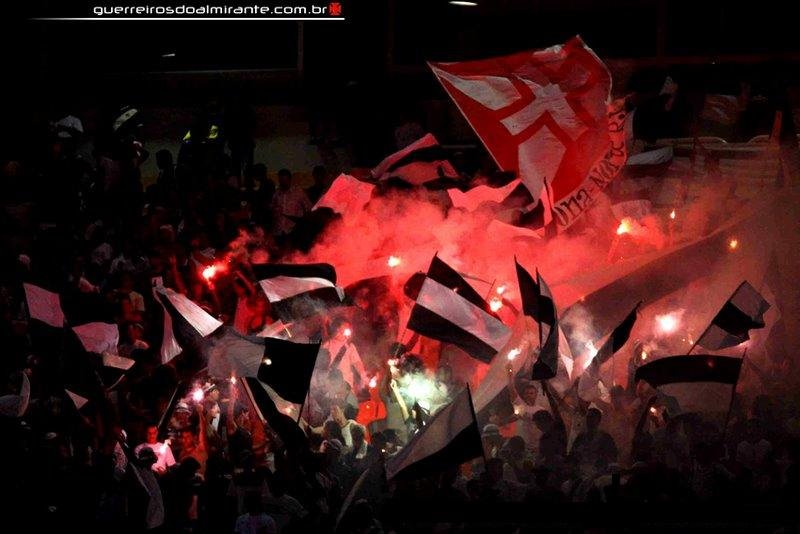
Celebration by Vasco da Gama fans at Maracanã in 2007.

The supporters of Vasco da Gama are recognized as one of the largest and most traditional fan bases in Brazilian football, standing out for their strong popular identification and the social diversity of their supporters. Vasco's fan base has developed an image of resilience and loyalty, particularly during periods of sporting and administrative difficulties faced by the club. The relationship between the club and its supporters is often marked by a strong sense of belonging, with the expressions "vascaíno" and "cruzmaltino" serving as elements of cultural identity among its fans. Vasco culture is also marked by the idea of collective suffering accompanied by unconditional loyalty, a characteristic frequently explored ironically by the supporters themselves. Even in the face of relegations, financial crises, and unstable seasons, the fan base continues to demonstrate high levels of engagement and mobilization, reinforcing Vasco’s image as a club with strong emotional appeal.

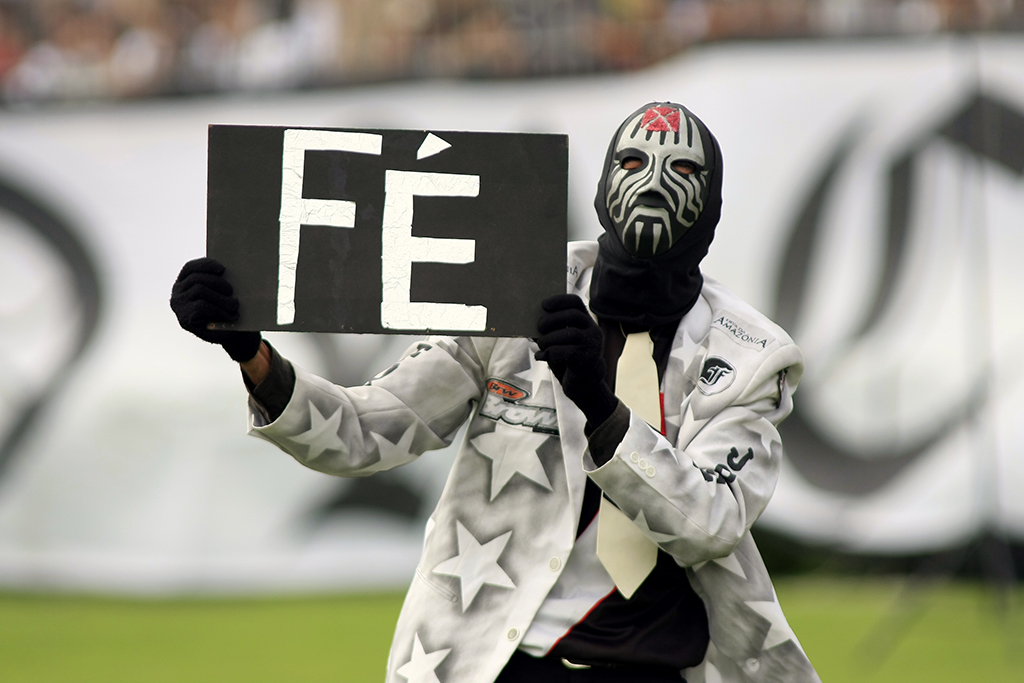
A fan wearing a mask referencing Val Valentino holding a sign that reads "fé" (faith).

In addition to their passionate and resilient character, Vasco supporters are also widely known for their self-deprecating humor and the constant creation of memes related to situations considered improbable or chaotic involving the club. On social media, the expression "coisas que só acontecem no Vasco" (English: things that only happen on Vasco) became commonly used to describe unusual episodes, seemingly absurd storylines, and events marked by drama, improbable turnarounds, or peculiar off-field incidents. This comedic aspect has become part of the contemporary identity of the fan base, which frequently transforms moments of crisis into humorous and viral internet content. In various contexts of Brazilian digital culture, Vasco came to occupy a symbolic space associated with unpredictability, often being referenced in memes, humorous videos, and sports discussions as a club where extraordinary events appear to occur with unusual frequency.

=== Rivalries ===
Vasco's biggest rivals are the other clubs in Rio de Janeiro: Botafogo, Flamengo and Fluminense. However, Vasco also attracts antipathy from fans of several other clubs across the country. According to a survey released by ESPN, Vasco is the third most hated club in the country, behind Flamengo and Corinthians, the clubs with the largest number of fans. This is mainly due to the past history of controversial directors and players who passed through the club.

Vasco's biggest rivalry is against Flamengo, called the Clássico dos Milhões (Derby of the Millions), usually played at the Maracanã and whose name comes from the fact that Flamengo and Vasco have the largest fanbases in the Rio de Janeiro and two of the five largest of Brazil. This rivalry has the highest average attendance in the Campeonato Brasileiro Série A. Vasco holds other strong local rivalry with Fluminense and Botafogo. The rivalry with Fluminense is deeply rooted in social and historical contrasts, especially the early-20th-century tensions involving racial and class issues, which helped shape the identities of both clubs. The rivalry with Botafogo, on the other hand, is more centered on football itself, marked by balanced matches, historic finals, and long-standing battles for local prestige.

== Records and statistics ==
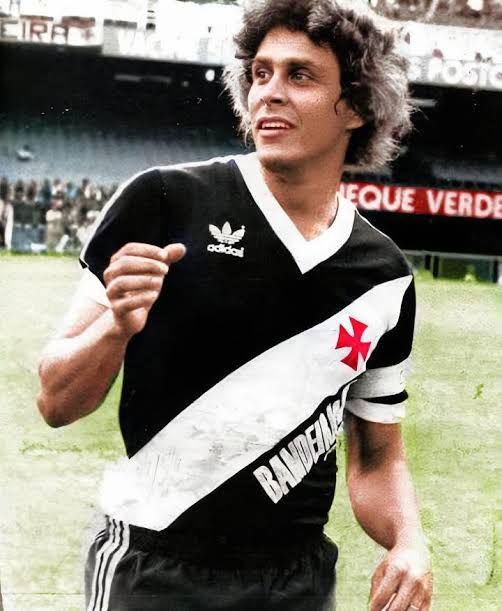
Roberto Dinamite holds the record for the most appearances (1,110) and most goals (708) made for Vasco da Gama.

Vasco da Gama has participated in over 100 editions of the Campeonato Carioca and over 50 editions of the Campeonato Brasileiro Série A, placing it among the clubs with the most appearances in both competitions. At the continental level, it has participated 9 times in the Copa Libertadores and 6 times in the Copa Sudamericana, as of 2025, in addition to participating in and winning the continent's first competition in history, the South American Championship of Champions.

Roberto Dinamite holds the club's main individual records, being the player with the most appearances (1,110) and the all-time top scorer (708). According to official figures, Dinamite has played 753 matches and scored 475 goals for Vasco da Gama. Dinamite also stands out as the all-time top scorer in the history of the Campeonato Carioca, with 284 goals, and Campeonato Brasileiro Série A, with 190 goals. Him also holds the record for goals at São Januário (184) and in all derbies against the club's main rivals: Botafogo (25), Flamengo (27) and Fluminense (36). Besides him, two other athletes surpassed 300 goals for the club: Romário (326) and Ademir de Menezes (301). Romário scored his 1000th career goal while playing for Vasco at São Januário. Among goalkeepers, Carlos Germano have the most appearances (632) for the club.

The record attendance for a Vasco da Gama game was 174,770 people at the Maracanã Stadium, during a match against Flamengo in the Campeonato Carioca on April 4, 1976. The largest attendance against a club from outside Rio de Janeiro and Brazil was at the friendly match against Real Madrid on February 8, 1961, which registered 129,209 people at the Maracanã Stadium. At São Januário, the club's record attendance is 60,000 spectators when the stadium could hold more people; this occurred in two friendly matches: against Montevideo Wanderers in 1928 and Arsenal in 1949. In an official match, the largest crowd at São Januário was 40,209 people against Londrina in the 1978 Campeonato Brasileiro Série A.

== Honours ==
Vasco's first trophy was the 1923 Campeonato Carioca, during the club's debut season in the state's first division, won by a squad in which the majority of players were black and which greatly influenced the fight against racism in Brazilian football. For a large portion of fans, the club's most important honour is not a trophy, but rather the Resposta Histórica, a letter sent in 1924 refusing the discriminatory order of the Rio de Janeiro league, which wanted to ban Vasco from its competitions if it did not disaffiliate twelve of its players (all black).

Vasco is the first Brazilian team (club or national team) to win an international tournament and the first club in the world to win a continental-level tournament, the 1948 South American Championship of Champions. The club was also the first to win an intercontinental tournament contested by two continental champion clubs, the 1957 Tournoi de Paris, against Real Madrid in the final.

In terms of the number of trophies won, Vasco's most successful decade was the 1990s, when the club won two Campeonato Brasileiro Série A titles, four Campeonato Carioca, one Torneio Rio–São Paulo, one Copa Libertadores and one Copa Mercosur.

=== Official tournaments ===
International
Competitions	Titles	Seasons
Tournoi de Paris	1	1957
Continental
Competitions	Titles	Seasons
Copa Libertadores	1	1998
South American Championship of Champions	1	1948
Copa Mercosur	1^{s}	2000
National
Competitions	Titles	Seasons
Campeonato Brasileiro Série A	4	1974, 1989, 1997, 2000
Copa do Brasil	1	2011
Campeonato Brasileiro Série B	1	2009
Inter-state
Competitions	Titles	Seasons
Torneio Rio–São Paulo	3	1958, 1966, 1999
Torneio João Havelange	1	1993
State
Competitions	Titles	Seasons
Campeonato Carioca	24	1923, 1924, 1929, 1934, 1936, 1945, 1947, 1949, 1950, 1952, 1956, 1958, 1970, 1977, 1982, 1987, 1988, 1992, 1993, 1994, 1998, 2003, 2015, 2016
Copa Rio	2	1992, 1993

- record
- ^{s} shared record

=== Others tournaments ===
==== International ====
- Torneio Luiz Aranha (1): 1940
- Chile International Tournament (1): 1953
- Torneio Internacional do Rio de Janeiro (2): 1953, 1965
- Torneio Octogonal Rivadavia Correa Meyer (1): 1953
- Teresa Herrera Trophy (1): 1957
- Chile International Triangular Tournament (1): 1957
- Lima Quadrangular Tournament (1): 1957
- Santiago Tournament (2): 1957, 1963
- Pentagonal Tournament of Mexico (1): 1963
- Trofeo Ciudad de Sevilla (1): 1979
- Festa d'Elx Trophy (1): 1979
- Colombino Trophy (1): 1980
- Torneio Madeira Autonomia (1): 1981
- Summer Tournament (1): 1982
- TAP Cup (1): 1987
- Los Angeles Golden Cup (1): 1987
- Ramón de Carranza Trophy (3): 1987, 1988, 1989
- Metz Tournament (1): 1989
- Friendship Tournament (1): 1991
- Ciutat de Barcelona Trophy (1): 1993
- Trofeo Ciudad de Zaragoza (1): 1993
- Copa Diário La Capital Argentina (1): 1994
- Troféu Ciudad de Palma de Mallorca (1): 1995
- Trofeo Bortolotti (1): 1997

==== Inter-state ====
- Taça dos Campeões Estaduais Rio–São Paulo: 1936
- Torneio Cinquentenário da Federação Pernambucana (1): 1965
- Torneio Imprensa de Santa Catarina (1): 1977
- Torneio José Fernandes (1): 1980
- Torneio João Castelo (1): 1982
- Taça Cidade de Juiz de Fora (2): 1986, 1987
- Torneio João Havelange (1): 1993
- Copa da Hora (1): 2010

==== State ====
- Taça Guanabara: 1965, 1976, 1977, 1986, 1987, 1990, 1992, 1994, 1998, 2000, 2003, 2016, 2019
- Taça Rio: 1984, 1988, 1992, 1993, 1998, 1999, 2001, 2003, 2004, 2017, 2021
- Other Campeonato Carioca rounds (9): 1972, 1973, 1974, 1975, 1977, 1980, 1981, 1988, 1997
- Torneio Municipal (4): 1944, 1945, 1946, 1947
- Torneio Relâmpago (2): 1944, 1946
- Torneio Extra (2): 1973, 1990
- Torneio Início (10): 1926, 1929, 1930, 1931, 1932, 1942, 1944, 1945

=== Runners-up ===
- FIFA Club World Cup (1): 2000
- Intercontinental Cup (1): 1998
- Copa Interamericana (1): 1998
- Campeonato Brasileiro Série A (4): 1965, 1979, 1984, 2011
- Copa do Brasil (2): 2006, 2025
- Supercopa do Brasil (1): 1990
- Torneio Rio–São Paulo (7): 1950, 1952, 1953, 1957, 1959, 1965, 2000
- Campeonato Carioca (26): 1926, 1928, 1930, 1931, 1935, 1944, 1948, 1961, 1968, 1974, 1976, 1978, 1979-I, 1980, 1981, 1986, 1990, 1996, 1997, 1999, 2000, 2001, 2004, 2014, 2018, 2019

=== Youth team ===
- Campeonato Brasileiro Sub-20 (1): 2026
- Copa do Brasil Sub-20 (1): 2020
- Supercopa do Brasil Sub-20 (1): 2020
- Copa do Brasil Sub-17 (1): 2025
- Copa São Paulo de Futebol Júnior (1): 1992
- Taça Belo Horizonte de Juniores (3): 1991, 1992, 2013
- Copa Macaé de Juvenis (1): 1998

== Players ==
=== First-team squad ===
As of 20 November 2026

Note: Flags indicate national team as defined under FIFA eligibility rules; some limited exceptions apply. Players may hold more than one non-FIFA nationality.

No.	Pos.	Nation	Player
1	GK	BRA	Léo Jardim
2	DF	URU	Puma Rodríguez
3	MF	BRA	Tchê Tchê
4	DF	URU	Alan Saldivia
5	MF	ARG	Santiago Sosa
6	DF	BRA	Lucas Piton
7	FW	BRA	David
8	MF	BRA	Jair
9	FW	ARG	Facundo Colidio
10	MF	COL	Johan Rojas (on loan from Monterrey)
11	FW	COL	Andrés Gómez
13	GK	BRA	Daniel Fuzato
17	FW	POR	Nuno Moreira
18	FW	COL	Marino Hinestroza
19	FW	BRA	Bruno Duarte
20	FW	BRA	Brenner
22	MF	ARG	Alan Lescano

No.	Pos.	Nation	Player
23	MF	BRA	Thiago Mendes (captain)
28	FW	BRA	Adson
29	DF	BRA	Paulinho
30	DF	BRA	Robert Renan (on loan from Zenit)
37	GK	BRA	Pablo
43	DF	BRA	Lucas Freitas
45	FW	ANG	Loide Augusto
46	DF	COL	Carlos Cuesta (on loan from Galatasaray)
55	DF	BRA	Gabriel Pereira (on loan from Copenhagen)
60	DF	BRA	João Vitor
66	DF	BRA	Cuiabano (on loan from Nottingham Forest)
77	FW	ARG	Claudio Spinelli
83	MF	BRA	Ramon Rique
85	MF	BRA	Mateus Carvalho
88	MF	BRA	Cauan Barros
96	DF	BRA	Paulo Henrique

==== Youth academy on first-team ====
The following players have previously made appearances or have appeared on the substitutes bench for the first team. Note: Flags indicate national team as defined under FIFA eligibility rules; some limited exceptions apply. Players may hold more than one non-FIFA nationality.

No.	Pos.	Nation	Player
40	GK	BRA	Phillipe Gabriel
50	MF	BRA	Gustavinho
54	DF	BRA	Alison
67	MF	BRA	Samuel
70	MF	BRA	Euder
72	FW	BRA	Bruno Lopes

No.	Pos.	Nation	Player
74	FW	BRA	Andrey Fernandes
80	DF	BRA	Bruno André
82	DF	BRA	Riquelme Avellar
86	FW	BRA	Lukas Zuccarello
87	DF	BRA	Breno Vereza
90	FW	BRA	Diego Minete

==== Other players under contract ====
Note: Flags indicate national team as defined under FIFA eligibility rules; some limited exceptions apply. Players may hold more than one non-FIFA nationality.

No.	Pos.	Nation	Player
—	DF	BRA	Riquelme

==== Out on loan ====
Note: Flags indicate national team as defined under FIFA eligibility rules; some limited exceptions apply. Players may hold more than one non-FIFA nationality.

No.	Pos.	Nation	Player
—	DF	BRA	Lyncon (at CRB until 30 November 2026)
—	MF	BRA	Guilherme Estrella (at CRB until 30 November 2026)
—	MF	ARG	Juan Sforza (at Talleres until 31 December 2026)
—	MF	BRA	Ray Breno (at Juventude until 30 November 2026)

No.	Pos.	Nation	Player
—	FW	ARG	Benjamín Garré (at Aris until 31 December 2026)
—	FW	BRA	GB (at Chaves until 30 June 2027)
—	DF	BRA	Walace Falcão (at Bangu until 31 December 2027)

== Personnel ==
=== Management staff ===
- Associative club (69% SAF):
  - Chairman: Pedrinho
  - Vice-chairman: Paulo Salomão
- 777 Partners (31% SAF):
  - Joshua Wander, Andres Blazquez, Donald Dransfield, Nicolas Maya, Steven W. Pasko
- Football director: Admar Lopes
- Football technical director: Felipe Loureiro
- Football operations director: Clauber Rocha

=== Coaching and medical staff ===
- Head coach: Pedro Emanuel
- Assistant coach: Bruno Lazaroni, Luisinho Quintanilha, Rui Gomes, Pedro Correia
- Goalkeeping coach: Leandro Franco, Nelcirio Franchin
- Fitness coach: Marcelo Arouca, Ricardo Daang, André Galbe,
- Medical staff: Ricardo Bastos, Hélio Fadel, Rodrigo Sasson
- Academy director: Rodrigo Dias

== Other sports ==
Although best known as a football club, Vasco da Gama is actually a comprehensive sports club. Its rowing team is one of the best of Brazil and of the continent, which swimmers regularly represent Brazil in international competitions.

Vasco da Gama women's football section was created in 1987. The team won the national league four times and the Campeonato Carioca eight times.

It beach soccer team is one of the best in the world. It is the club with the most Brazilian championship titles, holding a record of four. Internationally, it is the most successful team in the Copa Libertadores de Fútbol Playa with five titles, in addition to having won the inaugural Mundialito de Clubes.

Its basketball section won the Brazilian Championship three times, the South American Club Championship twice and the FIBA South American League twice. The club is also the first Brazilian club to play against an NBA team, San Antonio Spurs in the 1999 McDonald's Championship final.

== See also ==
- CR Vasco da Gama (women)
- CR Vasco da Gama (basketball)
- CR Vasco da Gama (beach soccer)
