= 1982 Campeonato Carioca =

Campeonato Carioca
- Season: 1982
- Champions: Vasco da Gama
- Relegated: Madureira; Portuguesa
- Taça de Ouro: Fluminense; Flamengo; Vasco da Gama; América; Botafogo; Campo Grande
- Taça de Prata: Volta Redonda; Americano; Bangu; Bonsucesso
- Matches: 136
- Goals: 360 (2.65 per match)
- Top goalscorer: Zico (Flamengo) - 21 goals
- Biggest home win: Vasco da Gama 5-0 Portuguesa (August 1, 1982); Fluminense 5-0 Americano (August 19, 1982); Botafogo 5-0 Madureira (October 17, 1982); Flamengo 5-0 Madureira (October 28, 1982); América 5-0 Madureira (November 13, 1982); Campo Grande 5-0 Portuguesa (November 20, 1982)
- Biggest away win: Madureira 0-8 Flamengo (August 4, 1982)
- Highest scoring: Madureira 0-8 Flamengo (August 4, 1982)

The 1982 edition of the Campeonato Carioca kicked off on July 17, 1982 and ended on December 5, 1982. It is the official tournament organized by FFERJ (Federação de Futebol do Estado do Rio de Janeiro, or Rio de Janeiro State Football Federation. Only clubs based in the Rio de Janeiro State are allowed to play. Twelve teams contested this edition. Vasco da Gama won the title for the 15th time. Madureira and Portuguesa were relegated.

== System ==
The tournament would be divided in three stages:

- Taça Guanabara: The twelve teams all played in a single round-robin format against each other. The champions qualified to the Final phase.
- Taça Rio: The twelve teams all played in a single round-robin format against each other. The champions qualified to the Final phase.
- Final phase: The champions of the two stages, plus the team with the best overall record would play that phase. each team played in a single round-robin format against each other and the team with the most points won the title.

== Championship ==
=== Taça Guanabara ===
Pos	Team	Pld	W	D	L	GF	GA	GD	Pts	Qualification or relegation
1	Flamengo	11	8	2	1	33	9	+24	18	Playoffs
2	Vasco da Gama	11	8	2	1	20	6	+14	18	Playoffs
3	Bangu	11	4	5	2	12	8	+4	13	
4	Volta Redonda	11	5	3	3	13	12	+1	13	
5	Fluminense	11	5	2	4	20	13	+7	12	
6	América	11	3	6	2	17	11	+6	12	
7	Botafogo	11	3	6	2	14	13	+1	12	
8	Bonsucesso	11	4	2	5	13	13	0	10	
9	Americano	11	3	4	4	9	16	−7	10	
10	Campo Grande	11	2	4	5	11	19	−8	8	
11	Portuguesa	11	1	1	9	5	26	−21	3	
12	Madureira	11	0	3	8	2	23	−21	3	

Updated to match(es) played on September 19, 1982. Source: RSSSF.com
Rules for classification: 1) points; 2) wins; 3) goal difference; 4) number of goals scored.

==== Playoffs ====
Team 1	Score	Team 2
Vasco da Gama	0–1	Flamengo

=== Taça Rio ===
Pos	Team	Pld	W	D	L	GF	GA	GD	Pts	Qualification or relegation
1	América	11	8	2	1	26	9	+17	18	Qualified to Final phase
2	Botafogo	11	8	1	2	24	7	+17	17	
3	Vasco da Gama	11	7	2	2	20	15	+5	16	
4	Campo Grande	11	6	3	2	19	10	+9	15	
5	Fluminense	11	6	1	4	16	13	+3	13	
6	Bonsucesso	11	3	6	2	9	7	+2	12	
7	Flamengo	11	5	1	5	18	13	+5	11	
8	Americano	11	3	2	6	11	15	−4	8	
9	Bangu	11	2	4	5	15	13	+2	8	
10	Volta Redonda	11	1	4	6	15	20	−5	6	
11	Portuguesa	11	2	1	8	10	31	−21	5	
12	Madureira	11	1	1	9	4	34	−30	3	

Updated to match(es) played on November 21, 1982. Source: RSSSF.com
Rules for classification: 1) points; 2) wins; 3) goal difference; 4) number of goals scored.

=== Aggregate table ===
Pos	Team	Pld	W	D	L	GF	GA	GD	Pts	Qualification or relegation
1	Vasco da Gama	22	15	4	3	40	21	+19	34	Qualified to Final phase
2	América	22	11	8	3	43	20	+23	30	Taça de Ouro
3	Botafogo	22	11	7	4	38	20	+18	29	Taça de Ouro
4	Flamengo	22	13	3	6	51	22	+29	29	Taça de Ouro
5	Fluminense	22	11	3	8	36	26	+10	25	Taça de Ouro
6	Campo Grande	22	8	7	7	30	29	+1	23	Taça de Ouro
7	Bonsucesso	22	7	8	7	22	20	+2	22	Taça de Prata
8	Bangu	22	6	9	7	27	21	+6	21	Taça de Prata
9	Volta Redonda	22	6	7	9	28	32	−4	19	Taça de Prata
10	Americano	22	6	6	10	20	31	−11	18	Taça de Prata
11	Portuguesa	22	3	2	17	15	57	−42	8	Relegated
12	Madureira	22	1	4	17	6	57	−51	6	Relegated

Updated to match(es) played on November 21, 1982. Source: RSSSF.com
Rules for classification: 1) points; 2) wins; 3) goal difference; 4) number of goals scored.

=== Finals ===
Pos	Team	Pld	W	D	L	GF	GA	GD	Pts	Qualification or relegation
1	Vasco da Gama	2	2	0	0	2	0	+2	4	Champions
2	Flamengo	2	1	0	1	1	1	0	2	
3	América	2	0	0	2	0	2	−2	0	

Updated to match(es) played on December 5, 1982. Source: RSSSF.com
Rules for classification: 1) points; 2) wins; 3) goal difference; 4) number of goals scored.
