= List of CR Vasco da Gama managers =

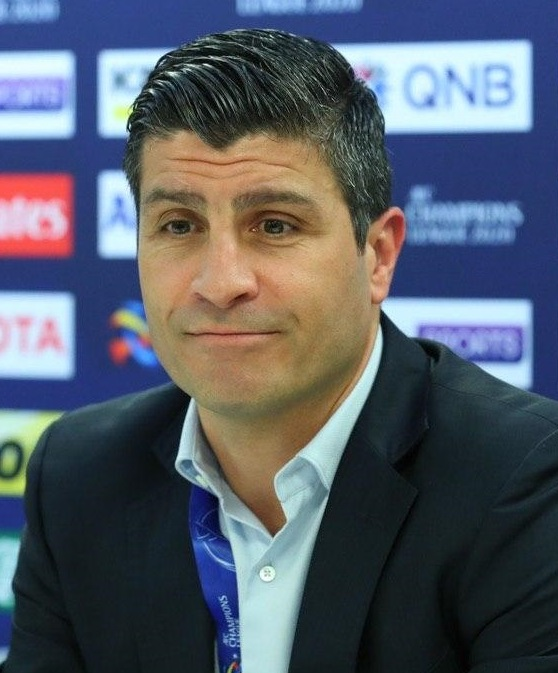
Pedro Emanuel is the current Vasco da Gama manager, serving since July 2026.

Club de Regatas Vasco da Gama is a Brazilian sports club founded in 1898 and best known for its professional football team, which began competing in 1915. Until April 1922, the team was managed by makeshift committees made up of directors, players, and associates. This chronological list includes all managers who have held the position since Ramón Platero in 1922, the team's first official manager. Each entry provides the manager’s history with the club and the titles won. Interim managers are also included, when known, as well as those appointed on a permanent basis.

== List of managers ==
There are no statistics for the period 1915–22, therefore only the head coaches from 1922 are listed below.

In the case of periods with interim coaches, they are not numbered as they were not official coaches.

Keys:

- indicates interim manager

No.	Name (per.)	From	To	Duration
(from 1915 until 1922, Vasco was coached by an improvised committee)
1	(Uruguay) Ramón Platero	24 April 1922	18 November 1926	1,669 days
2	(England) Henry Welfare	18 November 1926	3 June 1937	3,850 days
3	(Brazil) Floriano Peixoto	4 June 1937	16 February 1938	257 days
–	(Brazil) Russinho	17 February 1938	21 April 1938	63 days
4	(Uruguay) Carlos Scarone	21 April 1938	13 May 1939	387 days
–	(Uruguay) Ramón Platero (2)	14 May 1939	2 April 1940	324 days
5	(Brazil) Gentil Cardoso	3 April 1940	15 September 1940	165 days
–	(England) Henry Welfare (2)	19 September 1940	28 December 1941	465 days
6	(Brazil) Telêmaco Frazão	29 December 1941	8 January 1943	375 days
–	(England) Henry Welfare (3)	9 January 1943	23 March 1943	73 days
7	(Uruguay) Ondino Viera	24 March 1943	16 July 1946	1,210 days
8	(Portugal) Ernesto dos Santos	17 July 1946	1 October 1946	76 days
–	(Argentina) Roque Calocero	1 October 1946	18 January 1947	109 days
9	(Brazil) Flávio Costa	19 January 1947	2 February 1951	1,475 days
10	(Brazil) Otto Glória	2 February 1951	25 April 1952	448 days
–	(Brazil) Gentil Cardoso (2)	26 April 1952	22 January 1953	270 days
–	(Argentina) Carlos Volante	22 January 1953	18 February 1953	27 days
–	(Brazil) Augusto da Costa	18 February 1953	25 February 1953	7 days
–	(Brazil) Flávio Costa (2)	25 February 1953	28 February 1956	1,098 days
–	(Brazil) Augusto da Costa (2)	29 February 1956	21 March 1956	21 days
11	(Brazil) Martim Francisco	22 March 1956	7 November 1957	595 days
12	(Brazil) Gradim	7 November 1957	12 October 1959	704 days
13	(Brazil) Yustrich	13 October 1959	30 March 1960	169 days
–	(Brazil) Ely do Amparo	31 March 1960	8 April 1960	8 days
14	(Argentina) Filipo Núñez	9 April 1960	15 August 1960	128 days
–	(Brazil) Ely do Amparo (2)	16 August 1960	7 October 1960	52 days
15	(Argentina) Abel Picabea	7 October 1960	7 February 1961	123 days
–	(Brazil) Martim Francisco (2)	7 February 1961	21 July 1961	164 days
–	(Brazil) Ely do Amparo (3)	22 July 1961	29 August 1961	38 days
16	(Brazil) Paulo Amaral	30 August 1961	15 March 1962	197 days
17	(Brazil) Jorge Vieira	15 March 1962	15 September 1963	549 days
–	(Brazil) Otto Glória (2)	17 September 1963	13 November 1963	57 days
–	(Brazil) Eduardo Pelegrini	14 November 1963	3 March 1964	110 days
–	(Brazil) Paulinho de Almeida	3 March 1964	12 March 1964	9 days
18	(Brazil) Duque	13 March 1964	5 August 1964	145 days
–	(Brazil) Ely do Amparo (4)	5 August 1964	28 December 1964	145 days
19	(Brazil) Zezé Moreira	29 December 1964	11 November 1966	682 days
–	(Brazil) Ely do Amparo (5)	12 November 1966	11 January 1967	60 days
20	(Brazil) Zizinho	12 January 1967	6 June 1967	145 days
–	(Brazil) Gentil Cardoso (3)	8 June 1967	9 October 1967	123 days
21	(Brazil) Ademir de Menezes	9 October 1967	20 December 1967	72 days
–	(Brazil) Paulinho de Almeida (2)	21 December 1967	8 January 1969	384 days
22	(Brazil) Pinga	8 January 1969	8 April 1969	90 days
23	(Brazil) Evaristo de Macedo	9 April 1969	8 August 1969	121 days
–	(Brazil) Paulinho de Almeida (3)	8 August 1969	13 October 1969	66 days
–	(Brazil) Célio de Souza	14 October 1969	6 January 1970	84 days
24	(Brazil) Tim	7 January 1970	5 January 1971	363 days
–	(Brazil) Paulo Amaral (2)	6 January 1971	23 August 1971	229 days
25	(Brazil) Admildo Chirol	23 August 1971	3 January 1972	133 days
–	(Brazil) Zizinho (2)	4 January 1972	19 May 1972	136 days
–	(Brazil) Célio de Souza (2)	19 May 1972	24 May 1972	5 days
–	(Brazil) Coronel	24 May 1972	29 May 1972	5 days
26	(Brazil) Mário Travaglini	30 May 1972	3 January 1976	1,313 days
27	(Brazil) Paulo Emílio	12 January 1976	31 December 1976	354 days
28	(Brazil) Orlando Fantoni	6 January 1977	31 December 1978	724 days
29	(Brazil) Carlos Froner	10 January 1979	25 June 1979	166 days
–	(Brazil) Gílson Nunes	26 June 1979	28 June 1979	2 days
–	(Brazil) Otto Glória (3)	29 June 1979	26 December 1979	180 days
–	(Brazil) Orlando Fantoni (2)	27 December 1979	9 June 1980	165 days
–	(Brazil) Gílson Nunes (2)	10 June 1980	12 August 1980	63 days
30	(Brazil) Mário Zagallo	13 August 1980	30 June 1981	321 days
–	(Brazil) Célio de Souza (3)	1 July 1981	3 July 1981	2 days
31	(Brazil) Antônio Lopes	3 July 1981	29 May 1983	695 days
–	(Brazil) Miguel Ferreira	29 May 1983	31 May 1983	2 days
32	(Brazil) Carlos Alberto Zanata	1 June 1983	4 September 1983	95 days
33	(Brazil) Júlio César Leal	5 September 1983	19 October 1983	44 days
–	(Brazil) Otto Glória (4)	20 October 1983	1 December 1983	42 days
34	(Brazil) Edu Coimbra	3 December 1983	4 July 1985	579 days
–	(Brazil) Antônio Lopes (2)	5 July 1985	11 August 1986	402 days
35	(Brazil) Cláudio Garcia	13 August 1986	22 September 1986	40 days
36	(Brazil) Joel Santana	23 September 1986	29 June 1987	279 days
37	(Brazil) Sebastião Lazaroni	29 June 1987	26 June 1988	363 days
–	(Brazil) Carlos Alberto Zanata (2)	27 June 1988	8 February 1989	226 days
38	(Brazil) Orlando Lelé	9 February 1989	20 March 1989	39 days
39	(Brazil) Sérgio Cosme	21 March 1989	7 August 1989	139 days
–	(Brazil) Alcir Portella	8 August 1989	4 September 1989	27 days
40	(Brazil) Nelsinho Rosa	4 September 1989	20 December 1989	107 days
41	(Brazil) Alcir Portella (2)	20 December 1989	23 August 1990	246 days
–	(Brazil) Roberto Dinamite	27 April 1990	29 April 1990	2 days
–	(Brazil) Mário Zagallo (2)	24 August 1990	18 February 1991	178 days
–	(Brazil) Antônio Lopes (3)	19 February 1991	29 December 1991	313 days
–	(Brazil) Nelsinho Rosa (2)	30 December 1991	23 July 1992	206 days
–	(Brazil) Joel Santana (2)	24 July 1992	2 July 1993	343 days
–	(Brazil) Alcir Portella (3)	2 July 1993	29 November 1993	150 days
–	(Brazil) Gaúcho	18 August 1993	24 August 1993	6 days
42	(Brazil) Jair Pereira	30 November 1993	28 May 1994	179 days
–	(Brazil) Sebastião Lazaroni (2)	29 May 1994	12 December 1994	197 days
–	(Brazil) Alcir Portella (4)	18 September 1994	25 September 1994	7 days
–	(Brazil) Nelsinho Rosa (3)	13 December 1994	20 April 1995	128 days
43	(Brazil) Abel Braga	21 April 1995	19 June 1995	59 days
–	(Brazil) Alcir Portella (5)	20 June 1995	21 July 1995	31 days
–	(Brazil) Jair Pereira (2)	22 July 1995	2 October 1995	72 days
–	(Brazil) Carlos Alberto Zanata (3)	2 October 1995	21 February 1996	142 days
–	(Brazil) Alcir Portella (6)	22 February 1996	3 March 1996	10 days
44	(Brazil) Carlos Alberto Silva	4 March 1996	27 July 1996	145 days
–	(Brazil) Alcir Portella (7)	27 July 1996	26 October 1996	91 days
–	(Brazil) Antônio Lopes (4)	27 October 1996	2 March 2000	1,222 days
–	(Brazil) Alcir Portella (8)	17 May 1999	19 June 1999	33 days
–	(Brazil) Abel Braga (2)	5 March 2000	2 June 2000	89 days
–	(Brazil) Alcir Portella (9)	2 June 2000	12 June 2000	10 days
–	(Brazil) Tita	12 June 2000	7 July 2000	25 days
45	(Brazil) Oswaldo de Oliveira	7 July 2000	17 December 2000	163 days
–	(Brazil) Joel Santana (3)	17 December 2000	13 August 2001	239 days
–	(Brazil) Alcir Portella (10)	13 August 2001	15 August 2001	2 days
46	(Brazil) Hélio dos Anjos	15 August 2001	18 October 2001	64 days
47	(Brazil) Paulo César Gusmão	18 October 2001	3 January 2002	77 days
48	(Brazil) Evaristo de Macedo	4 January 2002	18 July 2002	195 days
–	(Brazil) Antônio Lopes (5)	20 July 2002	14 July 2003	359 days
49	(Brazil) Mauro Galvão	14 July 2003	15 December 2003	154 days
50	(Brazil) Geninho	15 December 2003	27 September 2004	287 days
–	(Brazil) Joel Santana (4)	27 September 2004	20 April 2005	205 days
51	(Brazil) Dário Lourenço	21 April 2005	17 July 2005	87 days
52	(Brazil) Renato Gaúcho	18 July 2005	13 April 2007	634 days
53	(Brazil) Celso Roth	16 April 2007	22 October 2007	189 days
–	(Brazil) Romário	22 October 2007	25 October 2007	3 days
54	(Brazil) Valdir Espinosa	25 October 2007	4 December 2007	40 days
55	(Brazil) Romário (2)	6 December 2007	5 February 2008	61 days
56	(Brazil) Alfredo Sampaio	6 February 2008	31 March 2008	54 days
–	(Brazil) Antõnio Lopes (6)	31 March 2008	6 August 2008	128 days
–	(Brazil) Tita (2)	7 August 2008	18 September 2008	42 days
–	(Brazil) Renato Gaúcho (2)	18 September 2008	7 December 2008	80 days
57	(Brazil) Dorival Júnior	12 December 2008	28 November 2009	351 days
58	(Brazil) Vagner Mancini	12 December 2009	25 March 2010	103 days
–	(Brazil) Gaúcho (2)	25 March 2010	18 May 2010	54 days
–	(Brazil) Celso Roth (2)	18 May 2010	12 June 2010	25 days
–	(Brazil) Paulo César Gusmão (2)	13 June 2010	28 January 2011	229 days
–	(Brazil) Gaúcho (3)	28 January 2011	3 February 2011	6 days
59	(Brazil) Ricardo Gomes	4 February 2011	28 August 2011	205 days
60	(Brazil) Cristóvão Borges	28 August 2011	10 September 2012	379 days
–	(Brazil) Gaúcho (4)	10 September 2012	12 September 2012	2 days
61	(Brazil) Marcelo Oliveira	12 September 2012	5 November 2012	54 days
–	(Brazil) Gaúcho (5)	5 November 2012	21 March 2013	136 days
62	(Brazil) Paulo Autuori	22 March 2013	9 July 2013	109 days
–	(Brazil) Dorival Júnior (2)	10 July 2013	29 October 2013	111 days
63	(Brazil) Adilson Batista	29 October 2013	30 August 2014	305 days
–	(Brazil) Jorge Luiz	30 August 2014	6 September 2014	7 days
–	(Brazil) Joel Santana (5)	6 September 2014	10 December 2014	95 days
64	(Brazil) Doriva	14 December 2014	21 June 2015	189 days
–	(Brazil) Celso Roth (3)	22 June 2015	15 August 2015	54 days
65	(Brazil) Jorginho	15 August 2015	28 November 2016	471 days
–	(Brazil) Cristóvão Borges (2)	29 November 2016	17 March 2017	108 days
–	(Brazil) Valdir Bigode	17 March 2017	19 March 2017	2 days
66	(Brazil) Milton Mendes	19 March 2017	21 August 2017	155 days
–	(Brazil) Valdir Bigode (2)	21 August 2017	26 August 2017	5 days
67	(Brazil) Zé Ricardo	26 August 2017	2 June 2018	280 days
–	(Brazil) Valdir Bigode (3)	2 June 2018	6 June 2018	4 days
–	(Brazil) Jorginho (2)	6 June 2018	13 August 2018	68 days
–	(Brazil) Valdir Bigode (4)	13 August 2018	26 August 2018	13 days
68	(Brazil) Alberto Valentim	26 August 2018	21 April 2019	238 days
–	(Brazil) Marcos Valadares	21 April 2019	12 May 2019	21 days
69	(Brazil) Vanderlei Luxemburgo	13 May 2019	13 December 2019	214 days
–	(Brazil) Abel Braga (3)	16 December 2019	15 March 2020	90 days
70	(Brazil) Ramon Menezes	30 March 2020	8 October 2020	192 days
–	(Brazil) Alexandre Grasseli	8 October 2020	14 October 2020	6 days
71	(Portugal) Ricardo Sá Pinto	14 October 2020	29 December 2020	76 days
–	(Brazil) Vanderlei Luxemburgo (2)	31 December 2020	25 February 2021	56 days
–	(Brazil) Diogo Siston	25 February 2021	6 March 2021	9 days
72	(Brazil) Marcelo Cabo	6 March 2021	19 July 2021	13 days
–	(Brazil) Alexandre Gomes	19 July 2021	21 July 2021	2 days
73	(Brazil) Lisca	21 July 2021	8 September 2021	49 days
74	(Brazil) Fernando Diniz	9 September 2021	12 November 2021	64 days
–	(Brazil) Fábio Cortez	12 November 2021	4 December 2021	22 days
–	(Brazil) Zé Ricardo (2)	4 December 2021	5 June 2022	183 days
–	(Brazil) Emílio Faro	5 June 2022	13 June 2022	8 days
75	(Brazil) Maurício Souza	13 June 2022	24 July 2022	41 days
–	(Brazil) Emílio Faro (2)	24 July 2022	6 September 2022	44 days
–	(Brazil) Jorginho (3)	6 September 2022	10 November 2022	65 days
76	(Brazil) Maurício Barbieri	6 December 2022	23 June 2023	199 days
–	(Brazil) Emílio Faro (3)	14 January 2023	20 January 2023	6 days
–	(Brazil) William Batista	23 June 2023	15 July 2023	22 days
77	(Argentina) Ramón Díaz	15 July 2023	27 April 2024	287 days
–	(Brazil) William Batista (2)	15 January 2024	21 January 2024	6 days
–	(Brazil) Rafael Paiva	28 April 2024	21 May 2024	23 days
78	(Portugal) Álvaro Pacheco	21 May 2024	20 June 2024	30 days
–	(Brazil) Rafael Paiva (2)	20 June 2024	24 November 2024	157 days
–	(Brazil) Felipe Loureiro	25 November 2024	19 December 2024	24 days
79	(Brazil) Fábio Carille	19 December 2024	27 April 2025	129 days
–	(Brazil) Felipe Loureiro (2)	27 April 2025	10 May 2025	13 days
–	(Brazil) Fernando Diniz (2)	10 May 2025	22 February 2026	288 days
–	(Brazil) Bruno Lazaroni	22 February 2026	3 March 2026	9 days
–	(Brazil) Renato Gaúcho (3)	3 March 2026	18 June 2026	107 days
–	(Brazil) Bruno Lazaroni (2)	19 June 2026	10 July 2026	21 days
80	(Portugal) Pedro Emanuel	11 July 2026	present	0 days

== Winning managers ==
This list includes the winning coaches from the major competitions.

Coach	Titles	Tournaments won
(Uruguay) Ramón Platero	2	Campeonato Carioca (1923, 1924)
(England) Henry Welfare	3	Campeonato Carioca (1929, 1934, 1936)
(Uruguay) Ondino Viera	1	Campeonato Carioca (1945)
(Brazil) Flávio Costa	4	Campeonato Carioca (1947, 1949, 1950), South American Championship (1948)
(Brazil) Gentil Cardoso	1	Campeonato Carioca (1952)
(Brazil) Martim Francisco	2	Campeonato Carioca (1956), Tournoi de Paris (1957)
(Brazil) Gradim	2	Campeonato Carioca (1958), Torneio Rio–São Paulo (1958)
(Brazil) Zezé Moreira	1	Torneio Rio–São Paulo (1966)
(Brazil) Tim	1	Campeonato Carioca (1970)
(Brazil) Mário Travaglini	1	Campeonato Brasileiro Série A (1974)
(Brazil) Orlando Fantoni	1	Campeonato Carioca (1977)
(Brazil) Antônio Lopes	6	Campeonato Carioca (1982, 1998, 2003), Campeonato Brasileiro Série A (1997), Copa Libertadores (1998), Torneio Rio–São Paulo (1999)
(Brazil) Sebastião Lazaroni	2	Campeonato Carioca (1987, 1988)
(Brazil) Nelsinho Rosa	1	Campeonato Brasileiro Série A (1989)
(Brazil) Joel Santana	4	Campeonato Carioca (1992, 1993), Copa Mercosur (2000), Campeonato Brasileiro Série A (2000)
(Brazil) Jair Pereira	1	Campeonato Carioca (1994)
(Brazil) Ricardo Gomes	1	Copa do Brasil (2011)
(Brazil) Doriva	1	Campeonato Carioca (2015)
(Brazil) Jorginho	1	Campeonato Carioca (2016)
