= List of CR Vasco da Gama records and statistics =

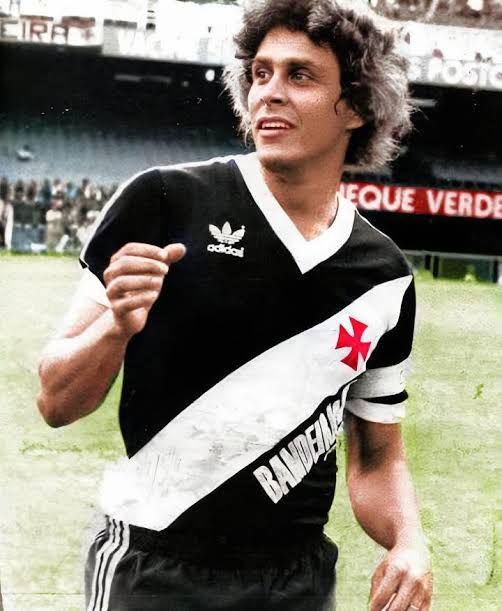
Roberto Dinamite holds the record for the most appearances (1,110) and most goals (708) made for Vasco da Gama.

Club de Regatas Vasco da Gama is a Brazilian professional football club based in Rio de Janeiro. The club was formed in 1898 as a rowing team, and formed its football team on 26 November 1915, when it incorporated Luzitania SC into the club. Its first match in history was a friendly against the now defunct Paladino FC on 3 May 1916. Vasco da Gama gained access to the Campeonato Carioca in 1922, and has competed in it since 1923, winning it in its debut year. Vasco da Gama currently plays in the Brazilian top-tier Campeonato Brasileiro Série A, They have also been involved in South American football since becoming the first club in the world to win a continental title, the South American Championship of Champions in 1948, on the club's 50th anniversary. Years later, they would win their first Copa Libertadores in 1998, on the club's 100th anniversary.

This list encompasses the major honours won by Vasco da Gama and records set by the club, their managers and their players. The player records section includes details of the club's leading goalscorers and those who have made most appearances in first team competitions. It also records notable achievements by Vasco da Gama players on the international stage, and the highest transfer fees paid and received by the club. The club's attendance records, both at São Januário, their home since 1927, and Maracanã Stadium, their alternative home from 1950, are also included in the list.

== Honours ==
Vasco da Gama have won honours both domestically and in South American competitions. They have won the Campeonato Brasileiro Série A title for four times, the Copa do Brasil once and a continental-level competition for three times. Their first title was the 1923 Campeonato Carioca, and their most recent success came in 2016, when it won its twenty-fourth state title. At the national level, its most recent title was the 2011 Copa do Brasil.

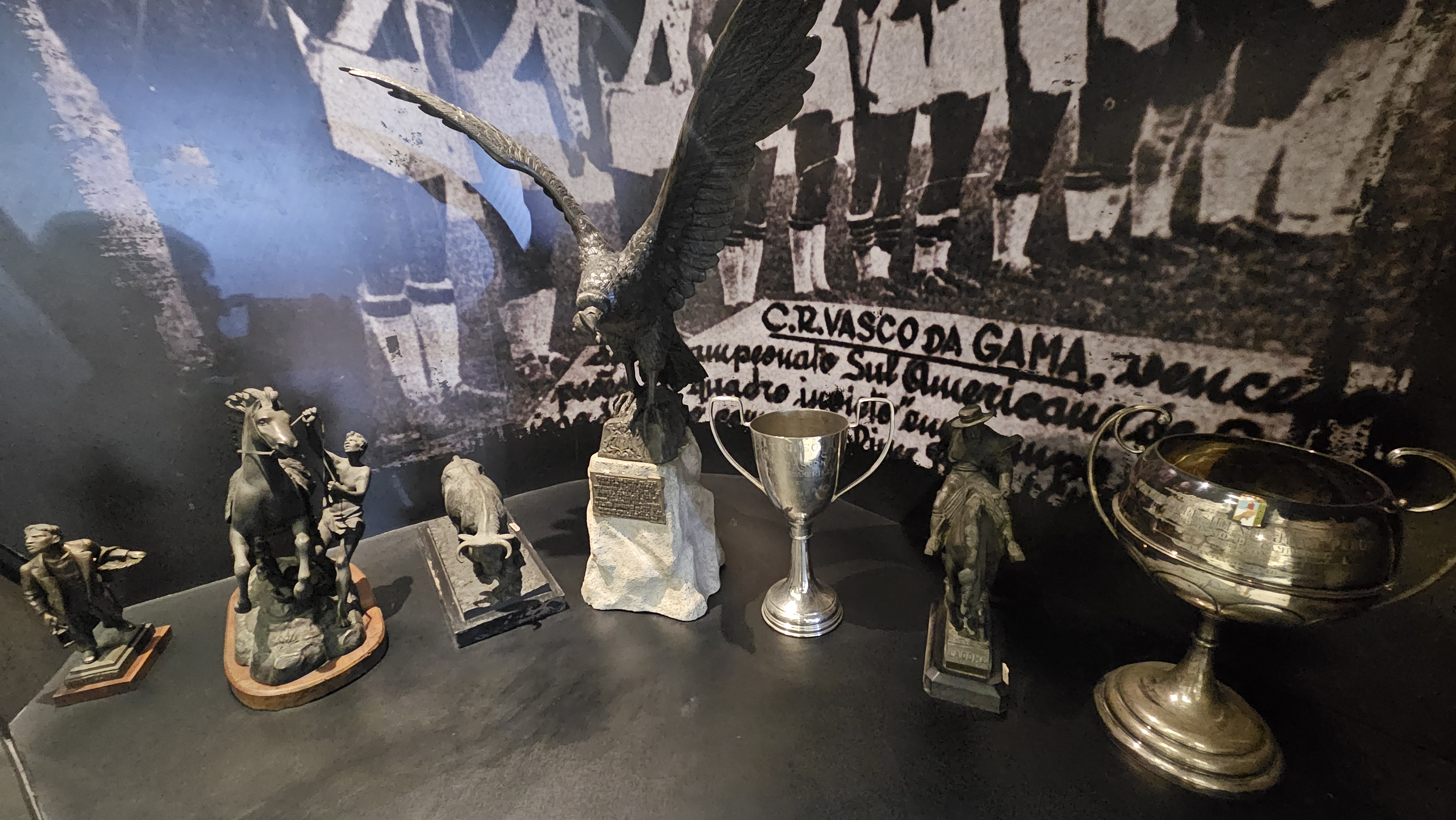
Trophies won by Vasco da Gama during the 1948 South American Championship.

CR Vasco da Gama honours
Type	Competition	Titles	Seasons
Domestic	Campeonato Brasileiro Série A	4	1974, 1989, 1997, 2000
Domestic	Campeonato Brasileiro Série B	1	2009
Domestic	Copa do Brasil	1	2011
Domestic	Torneio Rio–São Paulo	3	1958, 1966, 1999
Domestic	Campeonato Carioca	24	1923, 1924, 1929, 1934, 1936, 1945, 1947, 1949, 1950, 1952, 1956, 1958, 1970, 1977, 1982, 1987, 1988, 1992, 1993, 1994, 1998, 2003, 2015, 2016
Continental	Copa Libertadores	1	1998
Continental	South American Championship of Champions	1	1948
Continental	Copa Mercosur	1	2000
Intercontinental	Tournoi de Paris	1	1957

- Most trophies won in a single year: 2
  - 1958 (Campeonato Carioca, Torneio Rio–São Paulo)
  - 1998 (Campeonato Carioca, Copa Libertadores)
  - 2000 (Campeonato Brasileiro Série A, Copa Mercosur)
- Most consecutive years winning trophies: 4 (1947–1950; 1997–2000)
- Player with most titles: Moacir Barbosa (8)

== Club records ==
=== Matches ===
==== Firsts ====
- First match: Vasco da Gama 1–10 Paladino, Campeonato Carioca Third Division (3 May 1916, at General Severiano)
- First win: Vasco da Gama 2–1 River, Campeonato Carioca Third Division (29 October 1916, at Figueira de Melo)
- First Campeonato Carioca match: Vasco da Gama 1–1 Andarahy (15 April 1923, at General Severiano)
- First match at São Januário: Vasco da Gama 3–5 Santos, Friendly match (21 April 1927)
- First South American match: Vasco da Gama 2–1 Litoral, South American Championship of Champions (14 February 1948, at Estadio Nacional)
- First match at Maracanã: Vasco da Gama 3–2 Bangu, Campeonato Carioca (27 August 1950)
- First Campeonato Brasileiro Série A match: Vasco da Gama 0–1 Bahia, semifinals first leg (19 November 1959, at Maracanã)
- First Copa Libertadores match: Cruzeiro 3–2 Vasco da Gama, group stage (23 February 1975, at Mineirão)
- First Copa do Brasil match: Rio Negro 1–1 Vasco da Gama, first phase first leg (19 July 1989, at Vivaldão)

==== Wins ====
- Biggest win: Vasco da Gama 14–1 Canto do Rio, Campeonato Carioca (6 September 1947, at São Januário)
- Biggest home win: Vasco da Gama 14–1 Canto do Rio, Campeonato Carioca (6 September 1947, at São Januário)
- Biggest away win: Andarahy 0–12 Vasco da Gama, Campeonato Carioca (29 December 1937, at Laranjeiras)
- Biggest Campeonato Carioca win: Vasco da Gama 14–1 Canto do Rio (6 September 1947, at São Januário)
- Biggest Campeonato Brasileiro Série A win: Vasco da Gama 9–0 Tuna Luso (19 February 1989, at São Januário)
- Biggest Copa do Brasil win: Vasco da Gama 8–0 Picos, first phase second leg (10 February 1998, at São Januário)
- Biggest South American win: Vasco da Gama 5–1 Cerro Porteño, Copa Mercosur, group stage (5 October 1999, at Maracanã)
- Biggest Copa Libertadores win: Vasco da Gama 4–0 Deportivo Galicia, group stage (27 April 1980, at São Januário)

==== Losses ====
- Biggest lose: Vasco da Gama 1–10 Paladino, Campeonato Carioca Third Division (3 May 1916, at General Severiano)
- Biggest home lose: Vasco da Gama 1–10 Paladino, Campeonato Carioca Third Division (3 May 1916, at General Severiano)
- Biggest away lose: Cattete FC 6–0 Vasco da Gama, Campeonato Carioca Second Division (14 October 1917, at Estrada Dona Castorina)
- Biggest Campeonato Carioca lose: Fluminense 6–2 Vasco da Gama (11 May 1941, at Laranjeiras)
- Biggest Campeonato Brasileiro Série A lose: Athletico Paranaense 7–2 Vasco da Gama (27 July 2005, at Arena da Baixada)
- Biggest Copa do Brasil lose: Vasco da Gama 2–6 Cruzeiro, second phase first leg (28 March 1996, at São Januário)
- Biggest South American lose: River Plate 5–1 Vasco da Gama, Supercopa Libertadores, group stage (24 September 1997, at Monumental)
- Biggest Copa Libertadores lose:
  - Jorge Wilstermann 4–0 Vasco da Gama, qualifying third stage second leg (21 February 2018, at Olímpico Patria)
  - Racing 4–0 Vasco da Gama, group stage (19 April 2018, at El Cilindro)
  - Vasco da Gama 0–4 Cruzeiro, group stage (3 May 2018, at São Januário)

==== W/D/L in a season ====
In the Campeonato Brasileiro Série A with 38 matchdays, since 2006:

- Most wins in a season: 19 (2011)
- Most draws in a season: 16 (2010)
- Most losses in a season: 20 (2008)
- Fewest wins in a season: 10 (2015, 2018, 2020)
- Fewest draws in a season: 6 (2025)
- Fewest losses in a season: 7 (2011)

==== Streaks ====
- Longest unbeaten run: 35 matches (29 April 1945 to 24 February 1946)
- Longest without a win: 13 matches
  - (12 July 1986 to 14 September 1986)
  - (8 August 1990 to 4 October 1990)
- Longest winning streak: 13 matches
  - (18 May 1924 to 21 September 1924)
  - (7 January 1945 to 31 March 1945)
- Longest drawing streak: 6 matches
  - (5 October 1975 to 19 October 1975)
  - (3 June 2009 to 30 June 2009)
- Longest losing streak: 8 matches (3 May 1916 to 22 October 1916)
- Longest streak without conceding a goal: 10 matches (16 November 1988 to 15 December 1988)
- Longest streak without scoring a goal: 6 matches
  - (29 May 1971 to 26 June 1971)
  - (15 September 1976 to 10 October 1976)

=== Goals ===
==== Goals scored ====
- Most goals scored in a season: 139 (1979)
- Most Campeonato Carioca goals scored in a season: 112 (1979)
- Most Campeonato Brasileiro Série A goals scored in a season: 74 (2005)
- Most Campeonato Brasileiro Série A (with 38 matchdays; since 2006) goals scored in a season: 58 (2007, 2009)
- Fewest goals scored in a season:
- Fewest Campeonato Carioca goals scored in a season: 9 (2020)
- Fewest Campeonato Brasileiro Série A goals scored in a season: 2 (1959)
- Fewest Campeonato Brasileiro Série A (with 38 matchdays; since 2006) goals scored in a season: 28 (2015)

==== Goals conceded ====
- Most goals conceded in a season:
- Most Campeonato Carioca goals conceded in a season: 52 (1942)
- Most Campeonato Brasileiro Série A goals conceded in a season: 84 (2005)
- Most Campeonato Brasileiro Série A (with 38 matchdays; since 2006) goals conceded in a season: 72 (2008)
- Fewest goals conceded in a season: 9 (1924)
- Fewest Campeonato Carioca goals conceded in a season: 5 (1977)
- Fewest Campeonato Brasileiro Série A goals conceded in a season: 3 (1959)
- Fewest Campeonato Brasileiro Série A (with 38 matchdays; since 2006) goals conceded in a season: 40 (2011)

==== Consecutive matches with a goal ====
- Most consecutive Campeonato Brasileiro Série A matches with a Vasco da Gama goal:
- Most consecutive Campeonato Brasileiro Série A matches with a Vasco da Gama goal since the start of a season

=== Points ===
- Most Campeonato Brasileiro Série A (with 38 matchdays; since 2006) points in a season: 69 (2011)
- Fewest Campeonato Brasileiro Série A (with 38 matchdays; since 2006) points in a season: 40 (2008)

=== Attendances ===
- Highest home attendance at São Januário: 40,209 v Londrina, Campeonato Brasileiro Série A (19 February 1978)
- Highest home attendance at Maracanã: 174,770 v Flamengo, Campeonato Carioca (4 April 1976)
- Highest home attendance against foreign club: 129,209 v Real Madrid, Friendly match (8 February 1961, at Maracanã)
- Highest away attendance: 165,358 v Flamengo, Campeonato Carioca, final phase (22 December 1974, at Maracanã)

== Player records ==
=== Appearances ===
- Most appearances: Roberto Dinamite (1,110)
- Most Campeonato Carioca appearances: Roberto Dinamite (427)
- Most Campeonato Brasileiro Série A appearances: Roberto Dinamite (311)
- Most Copa do Brasil appearances: Felipe (37)
- Most South American appearances: Felipe (39)
- Most Copa Libertadores appearances: Felipe (24)

=== Most appearances ===
Rank	Player	Years	Matches
1.	(Brazil) Roberto Dinamite	1971–79, 1980–89, 1991–93	1110
2.	(Brazil) Carlos Germano	1991–99, 2004	632
3.	(Brazil) Sabará	1952–63	576
4.	(Brazil) Mazarópi	1974–83	477
5.	(Brazil) Alcir Portella	1963–75	468
6.	(Brazil) Pinga	1953–61	461
7.	(Brazil) Acácio	1982–91	459
8.	(Brazil) Moacir Barbosa	1945–55, 1958–60	451
9.	(Brazil) Coronel	1955–64	449
10.	(Brazil) Paulinho de Almeida	1954–64	436

=== Goals ===
- Most goals: Roberto Dinamite (708)
- Most Campeonato Carioca goals: Roberto Dinamite (284)
- Most Campeonato Brasileiro Série A goals: Roberto Dinamite (181)
- Most Copa do Brasil goals: Valdir Bigode (14)
- Most South American goals: Romário (15)
- Most Copa Libertadores goals: Luizão (8)

=== Most goals ===
Rank	Player	Years	Goals
1.	(Brazil) Roberto Dinamite	1971–79, 1980–89, 1991–93	702
2.	(Brazil) Romário	1985–88, 2000–02, 2005–06, 2007–08	326
3.	(Brazil) Ademir Menezes	1942–45, 1948–56	301
4.	(Brazil) Pinga	1953–61	250
5.	(Brazil) Russinho	1924–34	225
6.	(Brazil) Ipojucan	1944–54	225
7.	(Brazil) Vavá	1952–58	191
8.	(Brazil) Sabará	1952–64	165
9.	(Brazil) Lelé	1943–48	147
10.	(Brazil) Valdir Bigode	1992–94, 2002–04	143
11.	(Brazil) Edmundo	1992, 1996–97, 1999–00, 2003, 2008	138

== Transfers ==
=== Record transfer fee paid ===
- The list is ordered by the amount of € paid.

#	Player	From	Fee (€ million)	Fee (R$ million)	Date	Ref.
1.	(Brazil) Edmundo	(Italy) Fiorentina	€13,76	R$24	May 1999	
2.	(Brazil) Robert Renan	(Russia) Zenit	€8	R$50,9	November 2026	
3.	(Argentina) Alan Lescano	(Argentina) Argentinos Juniors	€6,08	R$36	September 2026	
4.	(Argentina) Santiago Sosa	(Argentina) Racing Club	€6,02	R$35,5	August 2026	
5.	(Brazil) João Victor	(Portugal) Benfica	€6 (Note: Initial €6 million plus reported €2 million bonuses.)	R$31,4	December 2023	
6.	(Brazil) Brenner	(Italy) Udinese	€5	R$31	January 2026	
7.	(Brazil) Adson	(France) Nantes	€5	R$26,6	January 2024	
8.	(Colombia) Andrés Gómez	(France) Rennes	€4,8	R$30	January 2026	
8.	(Colombia) Marino Hinestroza	(Colombia) Atlético Nacional	€4,8	R$30	January 2026	
10.	(Argentina) Juan Sforza	(Argentina) Newell's Old Boys	€4,6	R$24,6 (Note: Initial R$24,6 million plus reported R$4,1 million bonuses.)	February 2024	

=== Record transfer fee received ===
- The list is ordered by the amount of € received.

#	Player	To	Fee (€ million)	Fee (R$ million)	Date	Ref.
1.	(Brazil) Rayan	(England) Bournemouth	€28,5 (Note: Initial €28,5 million plus reported €6,5 million bonuses.)	R$179,6	January 2026	
2.	(Brazil) Paulinho	(Germany) Bayer Leverkusen	€25 (Note: Initial €25 million plus reported €10 million bonuses.)	R$105	April 2018	
3.	(Brazil) Douglas Luiz	(England) Manchester City	€13	R$45,5	July 2017	
4.	(Brazil) Andrey Santos	(England) Chelsea	€12,5	R$68,8	January 2023	
5.	(Brazil) Marlon Gomes	(Ukraine) Shakhtar Donetsk	€12 (Note: Initial €12 million plus reported €4 million bonuses.)	R$64,32	January 2024	
6.	(Brazil) Gabriel Pec	(United States) LA Galaxy	€9,222	R$49 (Note: Initial R$49 million plus reported R$7,425 million bonuses.)	January 2024	
7.	(Brazil) Diego Souza	(Saudi Arabia) Al-Ittihad	€8,2	R$31,75	July 2012	
8.	(Brazil) Edmundo	(Italy) Fiorentina	€7,7	R$8,64	July 1997	
9.	(Brazil) Talles Magno	(United States) New York City FC	€6,53	R$42 (Note: Initial R$42 million plus reported R$21 million bonuses.)	May 2021	
10.	(Brazil) Alex Teixeira	(Ukraine) Shakhtar Donetsk	€6	R$15	December 2009	

== Managerial records ==
- First manager: Ramón Platero (from 24 April 1922 to 18 November 1926)
- Longest-serving manager by time: Henry Welfare (3,850 days, from 18 November 1926 to 3 June 1937)
- Longest-serving manager by matches: Antônio Lopes (613 matches)
- Most matches won as manager: Antônio Lopes (312 wins)
- Most matches lost as a manager: Antônio Lopes (150 losses)
- Most successful manager: Antônio Lopes (won 6 main trophies with the club)
