= List of Campeonato Brasileiro Série A winning managers =

The Campeonato Brasileiro Série A is the professional association football league of Brazil. This is a list of Brasileirão Série A winning football managers. Including since 1959, after the unification of the champions of the Torneio Roberto Gomes Pedrosa and Taça Brasil.

The record for most titles is shared by two managers who won five each. Lula won five consecutively for Santos from 1961 to 1965. Vanderlei Luxemburgo won five with Palmeiras (1993, 1994), Corinthians (1998), Cruzeiro (2003) and Santos (2004).

Three foreigners have won the title: Argentine Carlos Volante for Bahia in the debut season in 1959, Portuguese Jorge Jesus for Flamengo in 2019 and Abel Ferreira for Palmeiras in 2022.

== Seasons and winning managers ==
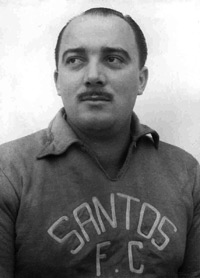
Lula won five Campeonatos Brasileiro titles in a row as Santos manager in the 1960s.

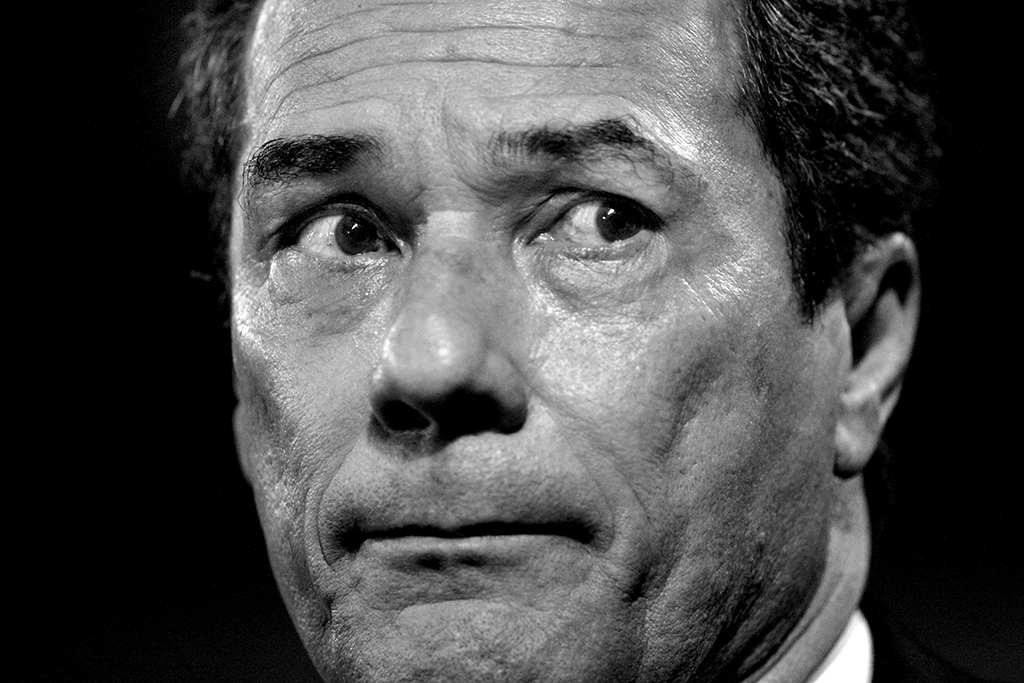
Vanderlei Luxemburgo was the winning manager five times, with Palmeiras (1993, 1994), Corinthians (1998), Cruzeiro (2003) and Santos (2004).

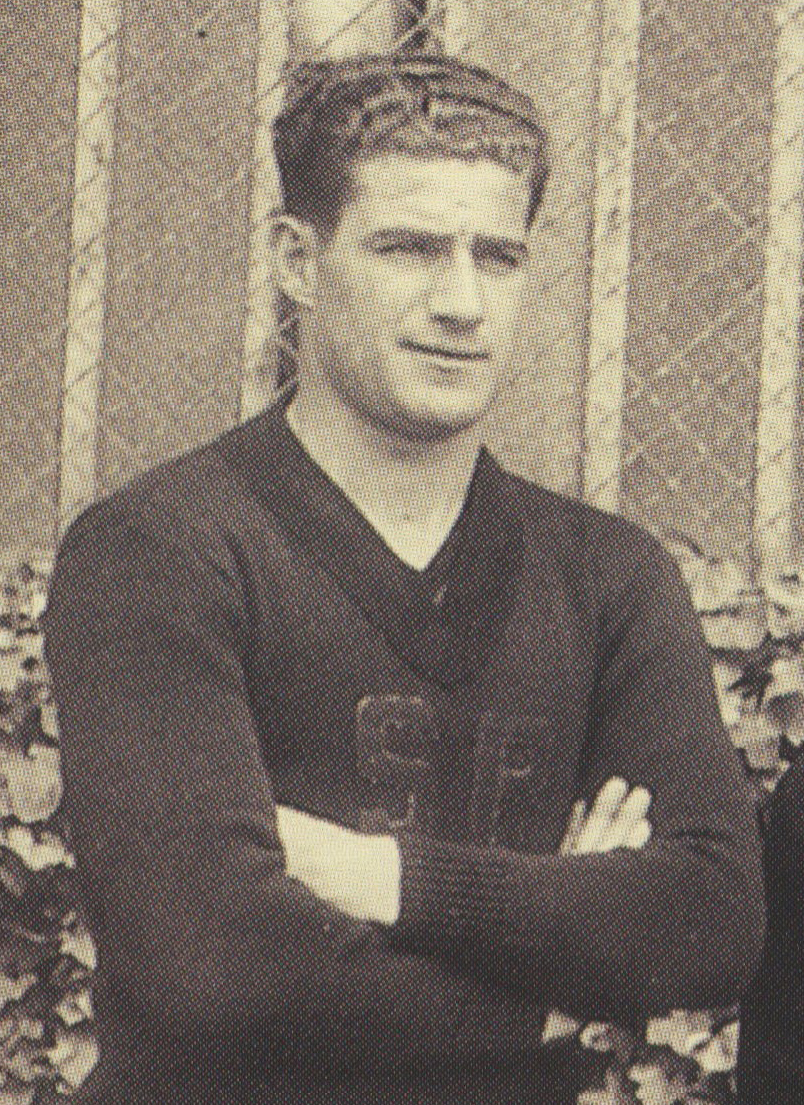
Argentine manager Carlos Volante won the first title in 1959 for Bahia.

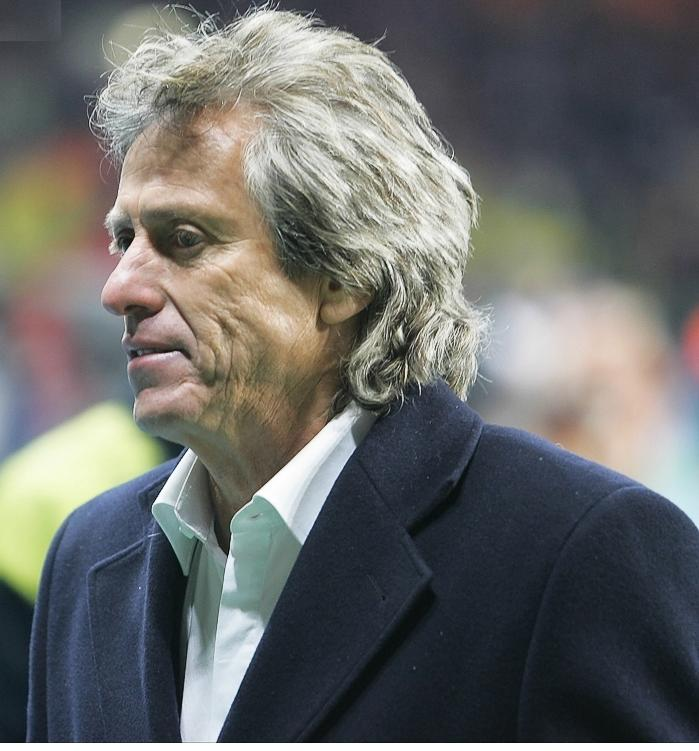
Jorge Jesus from Portugal won with Flamengo in 2019, becoming the first foreign manager to win since Volante.

Season	Country	Winning manager	Club	Ref.
1937	BRA	Floriano Peixoto	Atlético Mineiro	
1959	ARG	Carlos Volante	Bahia	
1960	BRA	Osvaldo Brandão (1)	Palmeiras	
1961	BRA	Lula (1)	Santos	
1962	BRA	Lula (2)	Santos	
1963	BRA	Lula (3)	Santos	
1964	BRA	Lula (4)	Santos	
1965	BRA	Lula (5)	Santos	
1966	BRA	Ayrton Moreira	Cruzeiro	
1967	BRA	Aymoré Moreira	Palmeiras	
1967	BRA	Mário Travaglini (1)	Palmeiras	
1968	BRA	Antoninho Fernandes	Santos	
1968	BRA	Zagallo	Botafogo	
1969	BRA	Rubens Minelli (1)	Palmeiras	
1970	BRA	Paulo Amaral	Fluminense	
1971	BRA	Telê Santana (1)	Atlético Mineiro	
1972	BRA	Osvaldo Brandão (2)	Palmeiras	
1973	BRA	Osvaldo Brandão (3)	Palmeiras	
1974	BRA	Mário Travaglini (2)	Vasco da Gama	
1975	BRA	Rubens Minelli (2)	Internacional	
1976	BRA	Rubens Minelli (3)	Internacional	
1977	BRA	Rubens Minelli (4)	São Paulo	
1978	BRA	Carlos Alberto Silva	Guarani	
1979	BRA	Ênio Andrade (1)	Internacional	
1980	BRA	Cláudio Coutinho	Flamengo	
1981	BRA	Ênio Andrade (2)	Grêmio	
1982	BRA	Paulo César Carpegiani	Flamengo	
1983	BRA	Carlos Alberto Torres	Flamengo	
1984	BRA	Carlos Alberto Parreira	Fluminense	
1985	BRA	Ênio Andrade (3)	Coritiba	
1986	BRA	Pepe	São Paulo	
1987	BRA	Jair Picerni	Sport	
1988	BRA	Evaristo de Macedo	Bahia	
1989	BRA	Nelsinho Rosa	Vasco da Gama	
1990	BRA	Nelsinho Baptista	Corinthians	
1991	BRA	Telê Santana (2)	São Paulo	
1992	BRA	Carlinhos	Flamengo	
1993	BRA	Vanderlei Luxemburgo (1)	Palmeiras	
1994	BRA	Vanderlei Luxemburgo (2)	Palmeiras	
1995	BRA	Paulo Autuori	Botafogo	
1996	BRA	Luiz Felipe Scolari (1)	Grêmio	
1997	BRA	Antônio Lopes (1)	Vasco da Gama	
1998	BRA	Vanderlei Luxemburgo (3)	Corinthians	
1999	BRA	Oswaldo de Oliveira	Corinthians	
2000	BRA	Joel Santana	Vasco da Gama	
2001	BRA	Geninho	Atlético Paranaense	
2002	BRA	Emerson Leão	Santos	
2003	BRA	Vanderlei Luxemburgo (4)	Cruzeiro	
2004	BRA	Vanderlei Luxemburgo (5)	Santos	
2005	BRA	Antônio Lopes (2)	Corinthians	
2006	BRA	Muricy Ramalho (1)	São Paulo	
2007	BRA	Muricy Ramalho (2)	São Paulo	
2008	BRA	Muricy Ramalho (3)	São Paulo	
2009	BRA	Andrade	Flamengo	
2010	BRA	Muricy Ramalho (4)	Fluminense	
2011	BRA	Tite (1)	Corinthians	
2012	BRA	Abel Braga	Fluminense	
2013	BRA	Marcelo Oliveira (1)	Cruzeiro	
2014	BRA	Marcelo Oliveira (2)	Cruzeiro	
2015	BRA	Tite (2)	Corinthians	
2016	BRA	Cuca (1)	Palmeiras	
2017	BRA	Fábio Carille	Corinthians	
2018	BRA	Luiz Felipe Scolari (2)	Palmeiras	
2019	POR	Jorge Jesus	Flamengo	
2020	BRA	Rogério Ceni	Flamengo	
2021	BRA	Cuca (2)	Atlético Mineiro	
2022	POR	Abel Ferreira	Palmeiras	
2023	POR	Abel Ferreira (2)	Palmeiras	
2024	POR	Artur Jorge	Botafogo	
2025	BRA	Filipe Luís	Flamengo	
