= 2003 Campeonato Brasileiro Série A =

Campeonato Brasileiro Série A
- Season: 2003
- Dates: 29 March – 14 December
- Champions: Cruzeiro; 1st Campeonato Brasileiro title 2nd Brazilian title
- Relegated: Fortaleza; Bahia
- Copa Libertadores: Cruzeiro; Santos; São Paulo; São Caetano; Coritiba
- Copa Sudamericana: Internacional; Atlético Mineiro; Flamengo; Goiás; Paraná; Figueirense; Grêmio
- Matches played: 552
- Goals scored: 1,593 (2.89 per match)
- Top goalscorer: Dimba (31 goals)
- Biggest home win: Goiás 7–0 Juventude (R6, 27 April)
- Biggest away win: Bahia 0–7 Cruzeiro (R46, 14 December)
- Average attendance: 15,629

The 2003 Campeonato Brasileiro Série A was the 47th edition of the Campeonato Brasileiro Série A. The first edition with only a double round-robin and no playoffs, it began on March 29, 2003, and reached its end on December 14. The competition was won by Cruzeiro Esporte Clube, who completed a treble.

== Format ==
The 24 teams played against each other twice. At the season finale, the team with the most accumulated points (3 for each win, 1 for a draw, none for a loss) was declared champion. The two lowest-placed teams were relegated to the Campeonato Brasileiro Série B of the following year.

== Standings ==
Pos	Team	Pld	W	D	L	GF	GA	GD	Pts	Qualification or relegation
1	Cruzeiro	46	31	7	8	102	47	+55	100	Qualified for 2004 Copa Libertadores and 2004 Copa Sudamericana
2	Santos	46	25	12	9	93	60	+33	87	Qualified for 2004 Copa Libertadores and 2004 Copa Sudamericana
3	São Paulo	46	22	12	12	81	67	+14	78	Qualified for 2004 Copa Libertadores and 2004 Copa Sudamericana
4	São Caetano	46	19	14	13	53	37	+16	74	Qualified for 2004 Copa Libertadores and 2004 Copa Sudamericana
5	Coritiba	46	21	10	15	67	58	+9	73	Qualified for 2004 Copa Libertadores and 2004 Copa Sudamericana
6	Internacional	46	20	10	16	59	57	+2	72	Qualified for 2004 Copa Sudamericana
7	Atlético Mineiro	46	19	15	12	76	62	+14	72	Qualified for 2004 Copa Sudamericana
8	Flamengo	46	18	12	16	66	73	−7	66	Qualified for 2004 Copa Sudamericana
9	Goiás	46	18	11	17	78	63	+15	65	Qualified for 2004 Copa Sudamericana
10	Paraná	46	18	11	17	85	75	+10	65	Qualified for 2004 Copa Sudamericana
11	Figueirense	46	17	14	15	62	54	+8	65	Qualified for 2004 Copa Sudamericana
12	Atlético-PR	46	17	10	19	67	72	−5	61	
13	Guarani	46	17	10	19	64	72	−8	61	
14	Criciúma	46	17	9	20	57	69	−12	60	
15	Corinthians	46	15	12	19	61	63	−2	59	
16	Vitória	46	15	11	20	50	64	−14	56	
17	Vasco	46	13	15	18	57	69	−12	54	
18	Juventude	46	12	14	20	55	70	−15	53	
19	Fluminense	46	13	11	22	52	77	−25	52	
20	Grêmio (Note: Grêmio qualified to 2004 Copa Sudamericana due to a CONMEBOL ranking (São Paulo, Cruzeiro and Flamengo also qualified via CONMEBOL ranking).)	46	13	11	22	54	68	−14	50	Qualified for 2004 Copa Sudamericana
21	Ponte Preta (Note: Ponte Preta docked the points conquisted in the matches against Internacional and Juventude for the irregulate fielding of the player Roberto. Otherwise, Internacional won 2 points and Juventude won 3 points.)	46	11	18	17	63	73	−10	50	
22	Paysandu (Note: Paysandu docked 8 points due to irregularities fielding of the players Júnior Amorim and Aldrovani. In other way, three points won to Ponte Preta, three for São Caetano, two for Corinthians and two for Fluminense.)	46	15	12	19	74	77	−3	49	
23	Fortaleza (R)	46	12	13	21	58	74	−16	49	Relegation to Série B
24	Bahia (R)	46	12	10	24	59	92	−33	46	Relegation to Série B

(R) Relegated

== Results ==
Home \ Away	ATM	ATP	BAH	COR	CTB	CRI	CRU	FIG	FLA	FLU	FOR	GOI	GRE	GUA	INT	JUV	PAR	PAY	PON	SAN	SCA	SPA	VAS	VIT
Clube Atlético Mineiro	—	1–2	1–0	2–3	1–2	1–1	0–1	1–1	1–0	3–0	2–0	3–2	3–2	3–2	1–2	2–1	2–2	3–2	2–0	0–0	3–1	2–2	2–1	1–0
Club Atlético Paranaense	1–2	—	2–1	3–1	2–0	5–2	1–4	1–2	4–1	3–0	3–1	0–0	2–0	3–1	2–1	2–0	1–0	1–1	4–2	0–2	1–0	4–3	2–2	1–2
Esporte Clube Bahia	2–4	0–2	—	0–0	2–2	2–2	0–7	1–1	1–2	2–2	1–0	2–1	2–1	2–0	1–3	3–1	4–2	2–0	1–0	4–7	0–0	3–0	3–0	2–1
Sport Club Corinthians Paulista	0–3	2–3	1–2	—	0–1	3–0	0–1	0–1	1–1	1–0	2–0	2–0	1–0	1–0	3–1	3–0	1–1	6–1	3–0	1–1	0–3	1–2	0–0	4–0
Coritiba Foot Ball Club	2–2	2–0	3–2	1–0	—	2–0	3–4	1–0	5–0	3–0	1–1	1–0	1–0	3–2	0–1	2–1	1–0	1–0	1–1	0–4	2–0	0–2	1–1	1–1
Criciúma Esporte Clube	1–0	2–0	3–2	1–0	2–3	—	1–3	1–0	4–3	2–0	2–2	1–0	0–2	1–0	1–0	3–0	1–2	2–0	3–0	1–3	0–1	1–1	2–1	1–1
Cruzeiro Esporte Clube	0–0	5–2	5–2	1–1	2–2	2–0	—	1–0	2–0	5–2	2–0	4–1	3–0	4–1	3–2	1–2	5–1	2–1	3–0	3–0	2–2	1–1	4–1	1–0
Figueirense Futebol Clube	0–1	1–1	1–0	3–3	1–2	4–2	1–0	—	0–0	2–2	2–2	0–1	2–1	2–0	3–2	2–1	4–2	6–0	0–0	1–0	3–0	2–2	0–0	1–2
Clube de Regatas do Flamengo	3–2	2–1	6–0	1–0	1–1	1–0	3–0	0–2	—	4–1	0–2	1–1	2–1	1–1	2–1	2–1	0–3	2–0	1–1	0–2	1–0	1–1	2–1	2–1
Fluminense Football Club	0–1	2–1	1–0	1–0	3–2	1–1	2–2	3–0	0–1	—	1–1	2–3	2–0	5–2	3–1	1–0	0–0	1–1	2–2	1–4	2–1	1–3	0–0	2–0
Fortaleza Esporte Clube	4–3	1–0	0–0	1–2	2–2	0–1	1–2	1–1	4–1	3–1	—	1–0	2–2	3–0	3–0	3–1	5–3	1–2	2–3	0–0	1–1	0–2	0–1	1–0
Goiás Esporte Clube	1–1	4–1	3–1	1–1	1–2	0–2	1–0	0–3	1–1	6–1	0–1	—	1–1	3–0	3–1	7–0	1–0	2–2	0–0	3–0	2–1	3–1	3–1	1–1
Grêmio Foot-Ball Porto Alegrense	2–2	1–1	1–1	3–0	1–0	0–2	0–1	3–1	2–0	0–1	3–1	0–1	—	3–1	0–0	1–4	0–2	2–0	2–2	2–0	0–0	1–2	4–3	2–1
Guarani Futebol Clube	2–2	1–0	3–2	0–1	2–1	1–0	1–1	2–1	5–3	2–0	2–1	3–2	2–0	—	3–0	2–0	2–0	2–1	1–3	1–2	0–1	0–1	4–2	2–2
Sport Club Internacional	3–3	1–1	2–0	2–1	1–0	2–0	1–0	3–0	3–1	0–1	1–1	2–1	0–1	2–0	—	0–0	2–1	2–1	1–1	1–0	0–0	1–1	2–1	0–1
Esporte Clube Juventude	1–0	4–0	1–0	6–1	2–1	3–1	0–1	1–2	2–2	2–1	2–2	0–2	1–2	1–1	1–1	—	1–1	2–0	0–0	1–1	2–1	2–2	0–0	1–1
Paraná Clube	1–1	3–0	3–1	1–1	2–3	2–1	1–3	1–1	6–2	2–0	4–1	3–1	3–1	0–0	4–0	1–2	—	4–2	3–2	1–2	1–1	4–2	3–3	2–0
Paysandu Sport Club	1–0	2–2	4–0	2–2	1–3	4–0	3–0	1–0	2–2	2–2	3–0	2–2	1–1	6–1	0–0	3–2	3–0	—	3–2	2–1	1–0	5–2	1–2	1–2
Associação Atlética Ponte Preta	2–1	2–2	1–0	3–3	1–1	1–1	1–3	1–1	1–1	3–0	2–0	0–2	2–1	0–2	1–4	1–0	4–0	4–4	—	3–4	0–0	1–2	2–2	1–1
Santos Futebol Clube	3–3	3–2	4–0	3–1	3–1	5–2	0–2	2–0	2–1	3–1	4–0	3–3	2–2	1–1	2–1	1–1	2–2	2–0	2–1	—	0–1	3–1	2–1	3–1
Associação Desportiva São Caetano	2–0	0–0	4–1	1–0	2–0	3–2	2–0	0–2	1–1	2–0	4–0	1–0	1–1	0–2	5–0	1–1	2–0	2–0	1–0	2–2	—	0–1	1–0	2–1
São Paulo Futebol Clube	2–2	2–0	2–2	3–0	1–0	0–0	2–4	3–2	1–3	1–0	3–1	1–0	3–1	3–3	0–2	3–1	2–0	1–0	1–2	1–2	1–1	—	3–1	3–1
Club de Regatas Vasco da Gama	2–2	2–1	1–1	2–2	2–1	2–0	0–1	1–0	1–2	2–1	1–1	6–4	2–0	0–0	0–1	1–1	1–4	0–2	1–0	1–1	1–0	3–2	—	1–0
Esporte Clube Vitória	0–1	2–1	2–1	1–2	1–0	1–1	2–1	1–1	1–0	2–1	2–1	3–4	4–1	0–0	0–3	3–0	0–3	1–1	1–4	2–0	0–0	0–2	2–1	—

Legend: Blue = home team win; Yellow = draw; Red = away team win.
Locations of the 2003 Série A teams

== Top scorers ==
Pos.	Scorer	Club	Goals
1	(Brazil) Dimba	Goiás	31
2	(Brazil) Renaldo	Paraná	30
3	(Brazil) Luís Fabiano	São Paulo	29
4	(Brazil) Alex	Cruzeiro	23
5	(Colombia) Víctor Aristizábal	Cruzeiro	22
6	(Brazil) Marcel	Coritiba	20
7	(Brazil) Ilan	Atlético-PR	16
8	(Brazil) Deivid	Cruzeiro	15
8	(Brazil) Marquinhos	Paraná	15
8	(Brazil) Wágner	Guarani	15
8	(Brazil) Róbson	Paysandu	15

== Coaching changes ==
Team	Outgoing head coach	Date of vacancy	Position in table	Incoming head coach	Date of appointment
Fortaleza	(Brazil) Luis Carlos Cruz	3 April 2003	20th	(Brazil) Ferdinando Teixeira	3 April 2003
Bahia	(Brazil) Bobô	26 April 2003	23rd	(Brazil) Evaristo de Macedo	1 May 2003
São Paulo	(Brazil) Oswaldo de Oliveira	3 May 2003	9th	(Chile) Roberto Rojas	4 May 2003
Figueirense	(Brazil) Vágner Benazzi	17 May 2003	22nd	(Brazil) Artur Neto	17 June 2003
Goiás	(Brazil) Candinho	25 May 2003	24th	(Brazil) Cuca	26 May 2003
Paraná	(Brazil) Cuca	25 May 2003	8th	(Brazil) Adilson Batista	27 May 2003
Grêmio	(Brazil) Tite	3 June 2003	21st	(Uruguay) Darío Pereyra	8 June 2003
Fortaleza	(Brazil) Ferdinando Teixeira	15 June 2003	22nd	(Brazil) Luis Carlos Cruz	17 June 2003
Vitória	(Brazil) Joel Santana	24 June 2003	15th	(Brazil) Edinho	25 June 2003
Fluminense	(Brazil) Renato Gaúcho	11 July 2003	12th	(Brazil) Joel Santana	18 July 2003
Vasco	(Brazil) Antônio Lopes	13 July 2003	20th	(Brazil) Mauro Galvão	14 July 2003
Paraná	(Brazil) Adilson Batista	16 July 2003	9th	(Brazil) Edu Marangon	12 August 2003
Flamengo	(Brazil) Nelsinho Baptista	17 July 2003	15th	(Brazil) Oswaldo de Oliveira	21 July 2003
Atlético Mineiro	(Brazil) Celso Roth	21 July 2003	7th	(Brazil) Marcelo Oliveira	23 July 2003
Grêmio	(Uruguay) Darío Pereyra	21 July 2003	22nd	(Brazil) Nestor Simionato	22 July 2003
Vitória	(Brazil) Edinho	27 July 2003	16th	(Brazil) Lori Sandri	4 August 2003
Atlético Paranaense	(Brazil) Vadão	4 August 2003	18th	(Brazil) Mário Sérgio	5 August 2003
Bahia	(Brazil) Evaristo de Macedo	7 August 2003	20th	(Brazil) Lula Pereira	18 August 2003
Figueirense	(Brazil) Artur Neto	12 August 2003	15th	(Brazil) Luiz Carlos Ferreira	12 August 2003
Fortaleza	(Brazil) Luis Carlos Cruz	17 August 2003	21st	(Brazil) Márcio Araújo	19 August 2003
Grêmio	(Brazil) Nestor Simionato	22 August 2003	24th	(Brazil) Adilson Batista	22 August 2003
Paraná	(Brazil) Edu Marangon	22 September 2003	16th	(Brazil) Saulo	23 September 2003
Figueirense	(Brazil) Luiz Carlos Ferreira	23 September 2003	12th	(Brazil) Dorival Júnior	25 September 2003
Corinthians	(Brazil) Geninho	29 September 2003	10th	(Brazil) Júnior	1 October 2003
Fluminense	(Brazil) Joel Santana	2 October 2003	22nd	(Brazil) Renato Gaúcho	2 October 2003
Flamengo	(Brazil) Oswaldo de Oliveira	12 October 2003	12th	(Brazil) Waldemar Lemos	14 October 2003
Corinthians	(Brazil) Júnior	13 October 2003	11th	(Brazil) Juninho Fonseca	14 October 2003
Bahia	(Brazil) Lula Pereira	25 October 2003	20th	(Brazil) Edinho	28 October 2003
Atlético Mineiro	(Brazil) Marcelo Oliveira	7 November 2003	7th	(Brazil) Procópio Cardoso	9 November 2003
Vitória	(Brazil) Lori Sandri	24 November 2003	16th	(Brazil) Nelsinho Goés	25 November 2003
