= Henry Welfare =

English footballer and manager

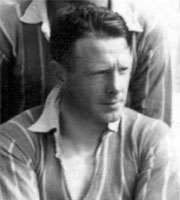

Personal information
- Full name: Henry Welfare
- Date of birth: 20 August 1888
- Place of birth: Liverpool, England
- Date of death: 1 September 1966 (aged 78)
- Place of death: Angra dos Reis, Brazil
- Position: Striker

Senior career*
Years	Team	Apps	(Gls)
1906–1912	Northern Nomads	114	(119)
1912–1913	Liverpool	4	(1)
1913	Tranmere Rovers	8	(8)
1913–1924	Fluminense	166	(163)
- * Club domestic league appearances and goals

Henry Welfare (20 August 1888 – 1 September 1966) was an English footballer and teacher who lived in Rio de Janeiro, Brazil. He is recognized for his time as a Fluminense player and as a Vasco da Gama coach.

== Early life ==
Welfare was a schoolteacher in the Anfield area of Liverpool, England. He played for Liverpool F.C. as an amateur footballer.

== Playing career ==
He arrived at Rio de Janeiro on 9 August 1913 to work as an English teacher on the Anglo-Brazilian Gym. Soon after, he started to play football for the Fluminense. He did wonders as a striker in his first training session and was quickly invited to join the squad. With Fluminense, he held the extraordinary record of almost a goal per game, scoring 163 goals in 166 games. Welfare ended his career after scoring the winning goal for Fluminense against Botafogo, in 1924. He played with Fluminense for 10 years, up to 1923.

For his loyal service to the club, he was elected a "Member For Life" of the Fluminense's deliberative council.

== Managerial career ==
In 1926, Welfare was called to coach the Vasco da Gama's football team. In command, he won the Campeonato Carioca in 1929, 1934 and 1936. In 1937, he left the club, but returned in two quick spells in the 1940s. He holds the record for the coach who led Vasco da Gama for the most consecutive days, with 3,850 days in his first spell.

== Honours ==
=== As player ===
Fluminense

- Campeonato Carioca: 1917, 1918, 1919

=== As manager ===
Vasco da Gama

- Campeonato Carioca: 1929, 1934, 1936

=== Individual ===
- Campeonato Carioca top scorer: 1914, 1915
- CR Vasco da Gama longest-serving manager: 3,850 days (approx. 10 years and 6 months)
