= Alexandre Grasseli =

Brazilian football manager (born 1974)

Personal information
- Full name: Alexandre Grasseli de Souza
- Date of birth: 5 May 1974 (age 52)
- Place of birth: Cachoeiro de Itapemirim, Brazil

Team information
- Current team: Cuiabá U23 (manager)

Managerial career
- Years: Team
- Montanhês de Ervália
- Viçosa
- 2005: América Mineiro U17
- 2006: Cruzeiro U15
- 2007–2008: Cruzeiro U17
- 2009: América Mineiro U20
- 2009–2011: Cruzeiro U20
- 2011: Cruzeiro (assistant)
- 2012: Tupi
- 2013: Nacional-MG (assistant)
- 2013: Nacional-MG
- 2014–2015: Petro Luanda
- 2016: Rio Branco-ES
- 2017: Anápolis (assistant)
- 2017: Anápolis
- 2017: Sport Recife (assistant)
- 2019: Cruzeiro U17
- 2019–2020: Vasco da Gama U20
- 2020: Vasco da Gama (interim)
- 2021–: Cuiabá U23

Alexandre Grasseli de Souza (born 5 May 1974) is a Brazilian football manager, currently in charge of Cuiabá's under-23 squad.

== Managerial career ==
Born in Cachoeiro de Itapemirim, Espírito Santo, Grasseli was a Physical Education graduate at the Federal University of Viçosa, Minas Gerais. He started working for amateur sides Esporte Clube Montanhês de Ervália and Viçosa Atlético Clube, before joining América Mineiro's youth setup in 2005.

Grasseli subsequently started working at Cruzeiro, being in charge of every squad from the under-15s to the under-20s; in 2011, he was also an assistant manager of the main squad for a brief period. On 8 December of that year, he was named manager of Tupi for the 2012 Campeonato Mineiro, but was sacked the following 6 February after only two matches.

On 3 October 2012, Grasseli was appointed Nacional-MG manager for the 2013 campaign, after being an assistant of Emerson Ávila during the year. On 15 January 2014, he moved abroad after being named at the helm of Angolan club Atlético Petróleos de Luanda.

Back to Brazil in December 2015, Grasseli took over Rio Branco-ES for the 2016 Campeonato Capixaba, but was sacked the following 21 February. For the 2017 season, he was an assistant manager of Caio Autuori (at Anápolis) and Ney Franco (at Sport Recife); he also worked as an interim manager at Anápolis.

Grasseli spent most of the 2018 season at Vasco da Gama, working as a coordinator of the youth setup. On 29 October of that year, he returned to Cruzeiro, being appointed manager of the under-17s.

On 25 November 2019, Grasseli returned to Vasco after replacing Marcos Valadares at the helm of the under-20s. On 9 October of the following year, he was named interim manager of the first team for the match against Flamengo, in the place of dismissed Ramon Menezes.

== Honours ==
Cruzeiro

- Campeonato Brasileiro Sub-20: 2010
