= Alcir Portella =

Brazilian footballer (1944–2008)

Alcir
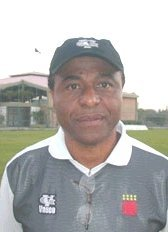

Personal information
- Full name: Alcir Pinto Portella Prates
- Date of birth: 9 May 1944
- Place of birth: Rio de Janeiro, Brazil
- Date of death: 29 August 2008 (aged 64)
- Place of death: Rio de Janeiro, Brazil
- Position: Defensive midfielder

Senior career*
Years	Team	Apps	(Gls)
1962–1963	Bonsucesso		
1963–1975	Vasco da Gama	511	(36)
1976	Nacional-AM		

Managerial career
- 1982–1983: Bonsucesso
- 1984: Campo Grande-RJ
- 1985: Olaria
- 1986: Paysandu
- 1989–1993: Vasco da Gama (assistant)
- 1993: Vasco da Gama
- 1994: Vila Nova
- 1995: Madureira
- 1995–2004: Vasco da Gama (assistant)
- 2004: Olaria
- 2005: Vasco da Gama (assistant)
- * Club domestic league appearances and goals as of 22 March 2024

Alcir Pinto Portella Prates (9 May 1944 – 29 August 2008), better known as Alcir Portella, was a Brazilian professional footballer and manager, who played as a defensive midfielder.

== Career ==
Midfielder, Alcir Portella started his career at Bonsucesso. In 1963 he arrived at Vasco where he won numerous titles, especially the Brazilian championship in 1974. He made 511 appearances for the club and scored 36 goals. He did not receive a single red card in 10 years, which earned him an edition of the Premio Belfort Duarte.

== Managerial career ==
Portella was coach of Bonsucesso, Olaria and Paysandu before returning to Vasco as an assistant coach, where he was part of the Brazilian champion committee in 1989. In 1993 he took over the club in winning the Copa Rio and the tournaments in Barcelona and Zaragoza in Spain. He was part of Vasco winning four national titles.

== Honours ==
=== Player ===
Vasco da Gama

- Campeonato Brasileiro: 1974
- Campeonato Carioca: 1970
- Torneio Rio-São Paulo: 1966
- Taça Guanabara: 1965
- Taça José de Albuquerque: 1972
- Troféu Pedro Novaes: 1973
- Taça Danilo Leal Carneiro: 1975

Individual

- Prêmio Belfort Duarte: 1974

=== Manager ===
Vasco da Gama

- Copa Rio: 1993
- Ciutat de Barcelona Trophy: 1993
- Trofeo Ciudad de Zaragoza: 1993

== Death ==
Alcir Portella died at his home in the Leme neighborhood, Rio de Janeiro, on 29 August 2008, victim of multiple organ failure. He was buried carrying flags of Vasco da Gama, Bonsucesso (his first club) and the Imperatriz Leopoldinense samba school.
