= Gentil Cardoso =

Brazilian footballer (1906–1970)

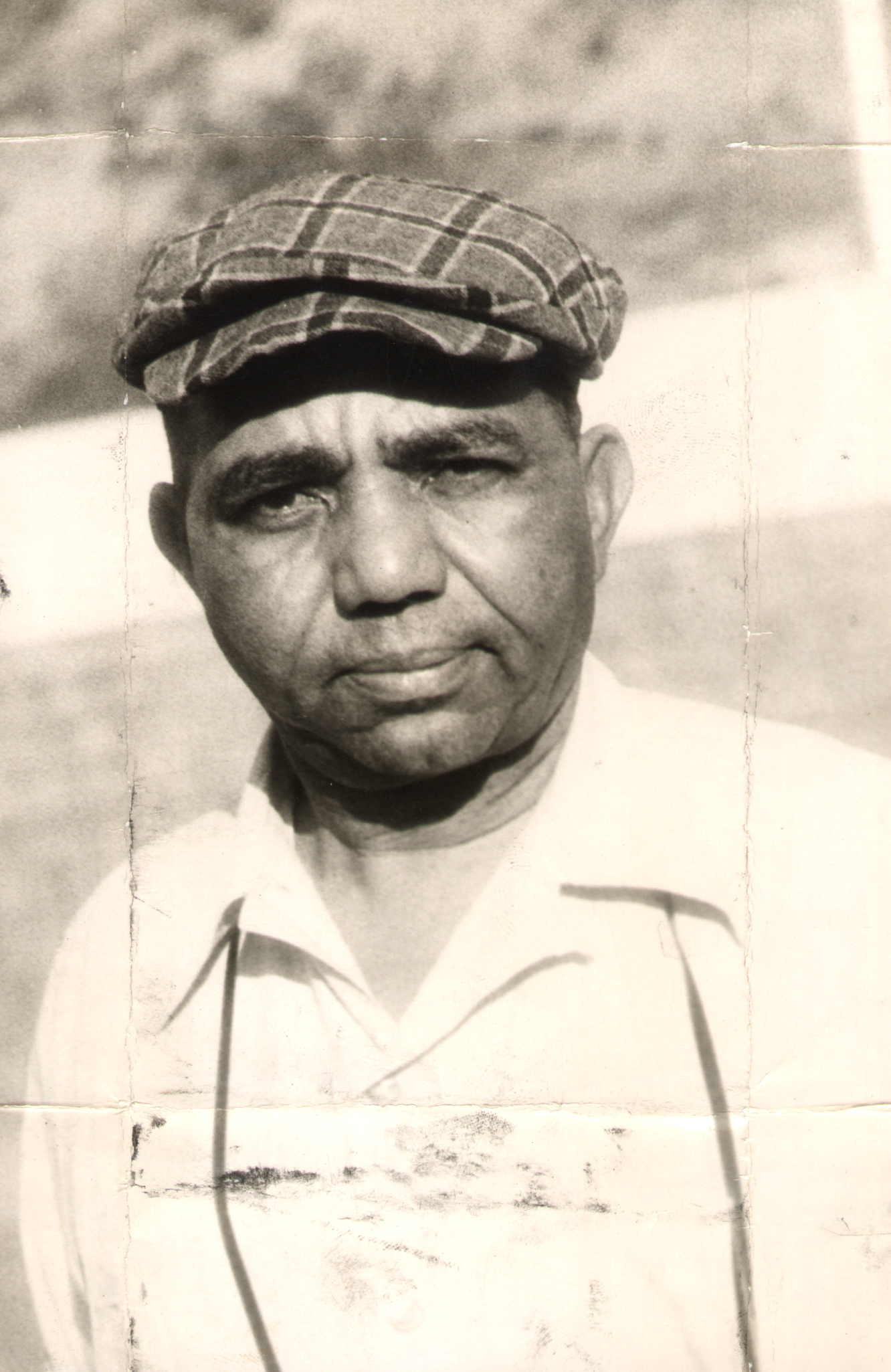
- Photo of Cardoso from the Arquivo Nacional Collection

Personal information
- Full name: Gentil Alves Cardoso
- Date of birth: 5 July 1906
- Place of birth: Recife, Brazil
- Date of death: 8 September 1970 (aged 64)
- Place of death: Rio de Janeiro, Brazil

Senior career*
Years	Team	Apps	(Gls)
1920s	São Cristóvão		
1920s	Palmeiras-RJ		
1920s	Syrio e Libanez-RJ		

Managerial career
- 1930: Syrio e Libanez-RJ
- 1931–1932: Bonsucesso
- 1933: Olaria
- 1934: America-RJ
- 1935–1936: Bonsucesso
- 1937: Rio-Grandense
- 1938–1939: Vasco da Gama
- 1939–1940: Cruzeiro-RS
- 1941: Bonsucesso
- 1942–1943: America-RJ
- 1943–1945: Rio-Grandense
- 1945–1947: Fluminense
- 1948: Corinthians
- 1949: Olaria
- 1949–1950: Flamengo
- 1950–1951: Cruzeiro-RS
- 1951–1952: Bonsucesso
- 1952: Vasco da Gama
- 1953–1954: Botafogo
- 1954–1955: Sport Recife
- 1956: Bonsucesso
- 1957–1958: Bangu
- 1959: Santa Cruz
- 1959: Brazil
- 1960–1961: Náutico
- 1961–1963: Paysandu
- 1963–1964: Sporting CP
- 1964: Portuguesa-RJ
- 1965: America-RJ
- 1965: Bangu
- 1966: Santa Cruz
- 1967: Campo Grande-RJ
- 1967: Vasco da Gama
- 1968: Paysandu
- 1968: El Nacional
- * Club domestic league appearances and goals

Gentil Cardoso (5 July 1906 – 8 September 1970) was a Brazilian footballer and manager.

== Playing career ==
As a player, Gentil Cardoso had little renown, playing for minor football teams in Rio de Janeiro during the 1920s, most notably for São Cristóvão.

== Managerial career ==
Gentil worked as a coach for several clubs, having started his career at Syrio and Libanez in 1930, the club with which he ended his career as a player. He won the Campeonato Carioca twice (in 1946 with Fluminense and 1952 with Vasco da Gama), in addition to being the coach of the Brazil national team in the 1959 South American Championship, held in Ecuador, and which included football representatives from Pernambuco state in the dispute. He also coached Sporting CP, winning the Taça de Honor and scoring the biggest defeat in European competitions, with a 16–0 victory over APOEL. He ended his career in 1969 at El Nacional de Quito.

== Personal life ==
Gentil ran away from home at the age of 13 to try his luck in Rio de Janeiro, working various odd jobs before becoming a player. As a coach he was marked by folkloric phases, the most folkloric being "It's going to be a zebra" (Portuguese: "Vai dar zebra"), referring to unusual results in football.

== Death ==
Gentil Cardoso died on 8 September 1970, victim of a gastric ulcer.

== Honours ==
=== Manager ===
Fluminense

- Campeonato Carioca: 1946

Corinthians

- Taça Cidade de São Paulo: 1948

Vasco da Gama

- Campeonato Carioca: 1952

Sport Recife

- Campeonato Pernambucano: 1955

Santa Cruz

- Campeonato Pernambucano: 1959

Náutico

- Campeonato Pernambucano: 1960

Paysandu

- Campeonato Paraense: 1961, 1962

Sporting

- Taça de Honra: 1963–64
