= Campeonato Brasileiro Série A attendance =

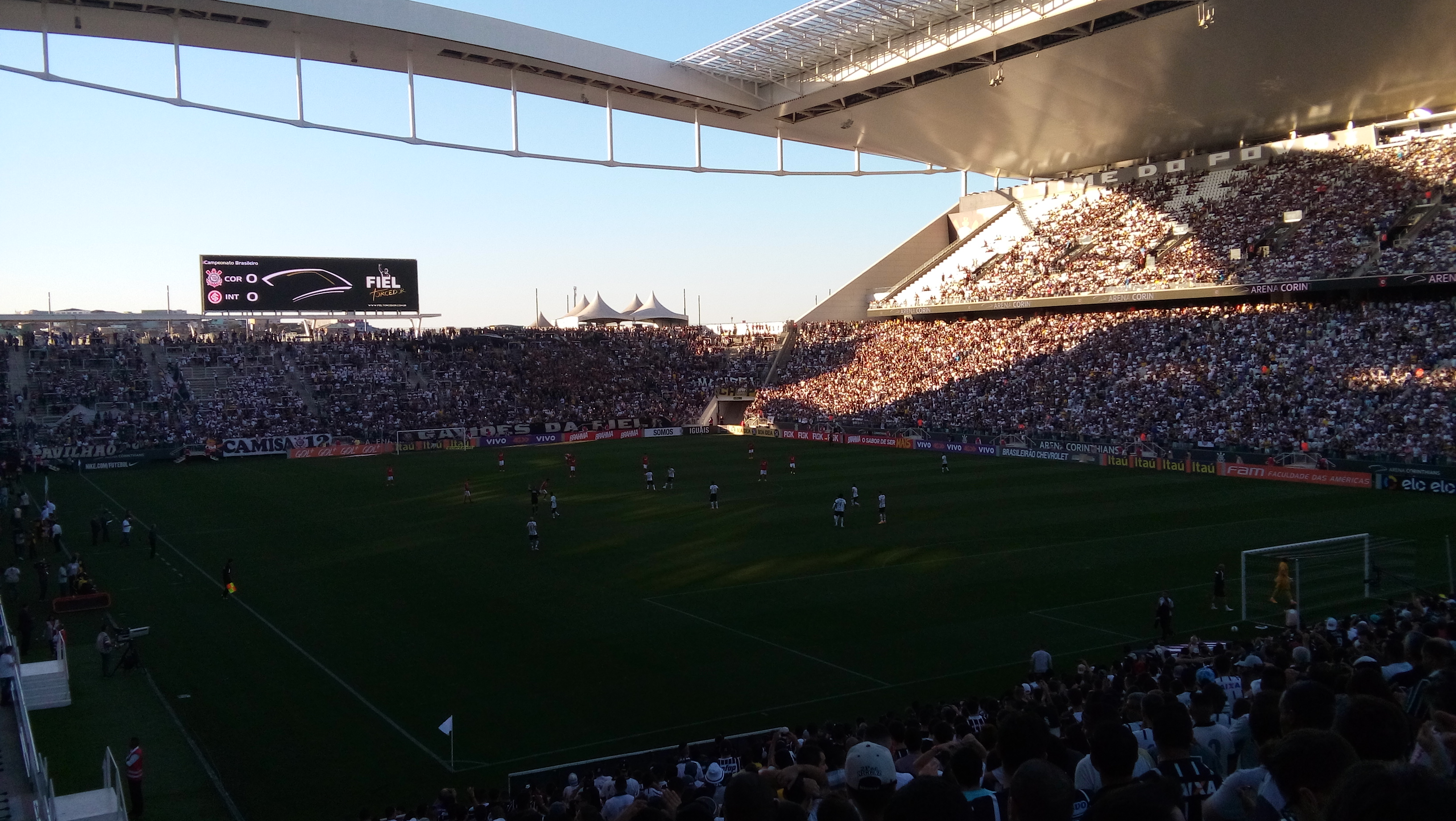
Flamengo (left) and Corinthians (right), the two most supported teams in Brazil, with 36,4 (18%) and 28,6 (14%) million of adepts, respectively, according to Datafolha, in a 2014 research.

The Campeonato Brasileiro Série A is the second largest league in attendance in South America (behind Argentina). Despite the great popularity of football in the country, the league has a low average audience compared to major football leagues in the world, the championship does not even appear among the top 10 average attendance in football league, the smallest attendance was in 2004 season with 9,136, the largest was in 1983 season with 22,953. The attendance of 2013 season was 16,337 with average occupation of 40%.

The smallest attendance ever was a game between Juventude and Portuguesa in 1997 with 55 fans, the largest was Flamengo and Santos in 1983 with 155,523.

== Attendance records ==
#	Attendance	Home	Score	Visitor	Stadium	Date
1	155,523	Flamengo	3–0	Santos	Maracanã	May 29, 1983
2	154,335	Flamengo	3–2	Atlético Mineiro	Maracanã	June 1, 1980
3	146,043	Fluminense	1–1	Corinthians	Maracanã	December 5, 1976
4	138,107	Flamengo	1–1	Grêmio	Maracanã	April 4, 1982
5	135,487	Botafogo	3–1	Flamengo	Maracanã	April 19, 1981
6	128,781	Fluminense	0–0	Vasco	Maracanã	May 27, 1984
7	122,001	Botafogo	2–2	Flamengo	Maracanã	July 19, 1992
8	121,353	Flamengo	1–1	Vasco	Maracanã	May 8, 1983
9	120,441	Flamengo	2–1	Guarani	Maracanã	April 11, 1982
10	118,777	Vasco	2–2	Internacional	Maracanã	July 28, 1974
11	118,370	Fluminense	0–0	Corinthians	Maracanã	May 20, 1984
12	118,162	Flamengo	1–0	Atlético Mineiro	Maracanã	November 29, 1987
13	117,353	Botafogo	0–0	Flamengo	Maracanã	April 16, 1981
14	115,002	Corinthians	4–1	Flamengo	Morumbi	May 6, 1984
15	114,481	Santos	2–1	Flamengo	Morumbi	May 12, 1983
16	113,479	Atlético Mineiro	0–0	Santos	Mineirão	May 15, 1983
17	113,286	Corinthians	2–1	Internacional	Morumbi	November 21, 1976
18	112,993	Vasco	2–1	Cruzeiro	Maracanã	August 1, 1974
19	112,403	Fluminense	1–1	Atlético Mineiro	Maracanã	December 20, 1970
20	112,047	Flamengo	1–4	Palmeiras	Maracanã	December 9, 1979
21	111,260	Flamengo	2–1	Vasco	Maracanã	May 5, 1983
22	111,111	Santos	3–2	Flamengo	Morumbi	February 27, 1983
23	110,877	Vasco	3–0	Grêmio	Maracanã	May 19, 1984
24	110,438	Bahia	2–1	Fluminense	Fonte Nova	February 12, 1989

== Attendances in 2023 ==
CR Flamengo drew the highest average home attendance in the 2023 edition of the Brazilian top-flight football league, followed by São Paulo FC.

#	Football club	Total attendance	Home games	Average attendance
1	CR Flamengo	1,101,693	19	57,984
2	São Paulo FC	840,196	19	44,221
3	EC Bahia	693,127	19	36,480
4	SC Corinthians Paulista	691,566	19	36,398
5	Fortaleza EC	638,244	19	33,592
6	SE Palmeiras	630,174	19	33,167
7	Atlético Mineiro	628,329	19	33,070
8	Fluminense	608,162	19	32,009
9	Grêmio	602,703	19	31,721
10	Cruzeiro EC	579,978	19	30,525
11	Botafogo FR	558,561	19	29,398
12	SC Internacional	519,185	19	27,326
13	CR Vasco da Gama	414,157	19	21,798
14	Athletico Paranaense	409,870	19	21,572
15	Coritiba	364,917	19	19,206
16	Cuiabá EC	319,867	19	16,835
17	Goiás EC	194,561	19	10,240
18	Santos FC	182,206	19	9,590
19	América FC	121,094	19	6,373
20	Red Bull Bragantino	114,870	19	6,046
