= Gaúcho (footballer, born 1953) =

Brazilian footballer

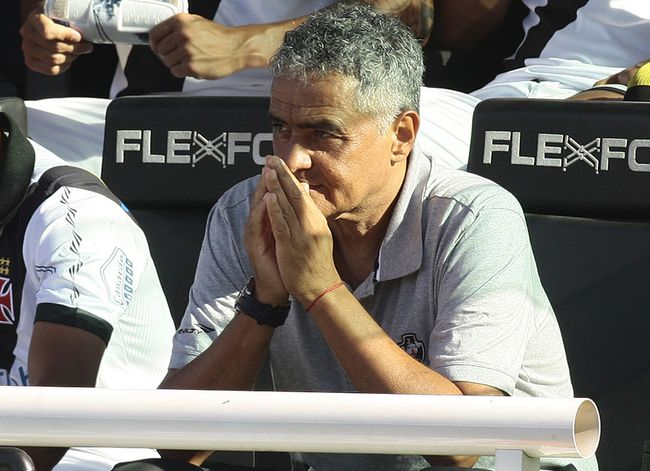

Personal information
- Full name: Carlos Roberto Orrigo da Cunha
- Date of birth: 3 February 1953 (age 73)
- Place of birth: Porto Alegre, Brazil
- Position: Centre-back

Youth career
- 1969–1971: Vasco da Gama

Senior career*
Years	Team	Apps	(Gls)
1971–1979	Vasco da Gama	377	(11)
1980	→Santa Cruz (loan)		
1980	→ Grêmio (loan)		
1981–1983	Botafogo		
1983	Coritiba		
1984	Fortaleza		
1984	Rio Negro-AM		
1985	Volta Redonda		

Managerial career
- 1985: Rio Negro-AM
- 1986–1987: Volta Redonda
- 1988: Maranhão
- 1991–1993: Vasco da Gama (U20)
- 1993: Vasco da Gama
- 1994: America-RJ
- 1994: América-MG
- 1995: Atlético Mineiro
- 1995: América-MG
- 1996: America-RJ
- 1996: Friburguense
- 1997: Bonsucesso
- 1998–1999: Al Wehda
- 2000–2001: Hajer
- 2002: Americano
- 2003–2004: América-MG
- 2004: Madureira
- 2004–2005: Al-Ansar
- 2005: Madureira
- 2006: JS Kabylie
- 2006–2007: Boavista
- 2008: America-RJ
- 2008–2010: Vasco da Gama (youth)
- 2011–2013: Vasco da Gama (assistant)
- 2013: Vasco da Gama
- 2016: Portuguesa-RJ
- 2019: Madureira
- * Club domestic league appearances and goals

Carlos Roberto Orrigo da Cunha (born 3 March 1953), better known as Gaúcho, is a Brazilian former professional footballer and manager who played as a centre-back.

== Playing career ==
Born in Porto Alegre, he earned the nickname Gaúcho while still playing at Vasco's youth team. As an athlete, he defended the club throughout practically the entire 1970s, accumulating 377 appearances and scoring 11 goals. He participated in the 1974 Brazilian title campaign.

== Managerial career ==
As a coach, Gaúcho began his career in 1985 at Rio Negro-AM. In the early 90s, he became coach of Vasco's under-20 team, and in 1992 he became champion of the Copa São Paulo de Futebol Jr., revealing players such as Leandro Ávila and Valdir. He also commanded Vasco's main team in the João Havelange Tournament in 1993. After that, he played for several other teams, notably America-RJ, América Mineiro, Atlético Mineiro and Americano, where he won the Taça Guanabara and Taça Rio in 2002.

== Honours ==
=== Player ===
Vasco da Gama

- Campeonato Brasileiro: 1974
- Campeonato Carioca: 1977
- Taça Guanabara: 1976, 1977
- Torneio Quadrangular do Rio: 1973
- Torneio Heleno Nunes: 1976
- Torneio de Sevilha: 1979

Grêmio

- Campeonato Gaúcho: 1980

Rio Negro-AM

- Taça Cidade de Manaus: 1984

=== Manager ===
Vasco da Gama

- Copa São Paulo de Futebol Jr.: 1992
- Torneio João Havelange: 1993
- Torneio Octávio Pinto Guimarães: 2009
- Copa do Brasil: 2011 (auxiliar do clube)

Americano

- Taça Guanabara: 2002
- Taça Rio: 2002

Boavista

- Campeonato Carioca Série A2: 2006
