= Zanata (footballer) =

Brazilian footballer (born 1950)

Personal information
- Full name: Carlos Alberto Zanata Amato
- Date of birth: September 6, 1950 (age 76)
- Place of birth: São José do Rio Pardo (SP), Brazil
- Position: Defensive midfielder

Senior career*
Years	Team	Apps	(Gls)
1968–1973	Flamengo	140	(16)
1973–1978	Vasco da Gama	305	(30)
1978–1981	Monterrey	70	(13)
1981	Coritiba		

Managerial career
- 1983: Vasco da Gama
- 1987: Avaí
- 1988–1989: Vasco da Gama
- 1990: Al-Ahli
- * Club domestic league appearances and goals

Carlos Alberto Zanata Amato, better known as Zanata (born September 6, 1950), is a Brazilian former football defensive midfielder, who played for several Série A clubs.

== Career ==
Born in São José do Rio Pardo, Zanata started his career in 1968, defending Flamengo. Before leaving the club in 1973, he won Placar's Bola de Prata (silver ball) award in 1970, won the Campeonato Carioca in 1972, and played 19 Série A games, and scored once. He joined Flamengo's rival Vasco in 1973, winning the Série A in 1974 and the Campeonato Carioca in 1977. Zanata played 120 Série A games and scored eight goals for the club. He played for Mexican club Monterrey from 1978 to 1981, retiring in 1981 while playing for Coritiba.

== Honors ==
Flamengo

- Campeonato Carioca: 1972
- Taça Guanabara: 1970 e 1972
- Torneio do Povo: 1972
- Torneio Internacional de Verão: 1972

Vasco da Gama

- Campeonato Brasileiro: 1974
- Campeonato Carioca: 1977
- Taça Guanabara: 1976 e 1977
- Torneio Quadrangular do Rio de Janeiro: 1973
- Torneio Heleno Nunes: 1976
