= Gílson Nunes =

Brazilian footballer and manager (born 1946)

Personal information
- Full name: Gílson Siqueira Nunes
- Date of birth: 12 June 1946 (age 80)
- Place of birth: Rio de Janeiro (RJ), Brazil
- Position: Midfielder

Senior career*
Years	Team	Apps	(Gls)
1963	Bonsucesso		
1963–1969	Fluminense		
1970–1974	Vasco da Gama		
1974–1978	America		

Managerial career
- 1979–1981: Vasco da Gama (assistant)
- 1981–1983: Al Wasl (assistant)
- 1983: Brazil Olympic
- 1984: America
- 1985–1987: Brazil U20
- 1989: Brazil (assistant)
- 1989–1990: Al Wasl
- 1990–1991: Fluminense
- 1991: Náutico
- 1992: Bahia
- 1993: São José
- 1993: Sport
- 1994: Náutico
- 1995: Morocco
- 1996: São José
- 1997: Juventude
- 1998: Goiás
- 1998–1999: Botafogo
- 2000: Costa Rica
- 2002: Portuguesa
- 2005–2007: Al-Riyadh
- 2014: America
- * Club domestic league appearances and goals

Gílson Siqueira Nunes (born 12 June 1946) is a Brazilian football manager. He is known for his success with Brazil at youth level.

As a coach, he won the FIFA World Youth Championship in 1985 with Brazil.

He was also briefly the head coach of the Morocco and Costa Rica national teams in 1995 and 2000 respectively.
