= Paulinho de Almeida =

Brazilian footballer (1932–2007)

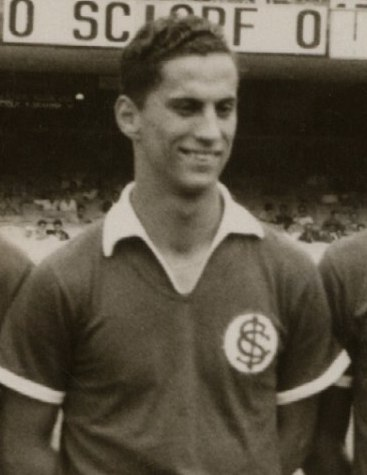

Personal information
- Full name: Paulo de Almeida Ribeiro
- Date of birth: 15 April 1932
- Place of birth: Porto Alegre, Brazil
- Date of death: 11 June 2007 (aged 75)
- Position: Defender

Senior career*
Years	Team	Apps	(Gls)
1950–1954	Internacional		
1954–1964	Vasco da Gama		

International career
1954–1959	Brazil		

Managerial career
- 1966: Internacional
- 1968: Vasco da Gama
- 1969: Olaria
- 1969: Náutico
- 1971: Bangu
- 1971: Botafogo
- 1972: Vitória
- 1972: América
- 1973: Olaria
- 1974: Remo
- 1975: Coritiba
- 1976: Sport Recife
- 1977: Ceará
- 1978: Vila Nova
- 1979: Campo Grande
- 1980: Grêmio
- 1981: Botafogo
- 1982: Palmeiras
- 1982: Fluminense
- 1983: Atlético Mineiro
- 1985: Bahia
- 1986: Rio Branco
- 1987: Santa Cruz
- 1987: Bahia
- 1988: Atlético Mineiro
- 1988: Volta Redonda
- 1992: Paysandu
- 1995: Joinville
- 1996: Moto Club
- * Club domestic league appearances and goals

Paulo de Almeida Ribeiro, best known as "Paulinho" (15 April 1932 – 11 June 2007) was a Brazilian footballer who played as a defender for the Brazil national team.

== Honours ==
Internacional

- Campeonato Gaúcho: 1951, 1952, 1953.

Vasco da Gama

- Campeonato Carioca: 1956, 1958
- Torneio Rio-São Paulo: 1958
