= Antônio Lopes =

Brazilian footballer and head coach (born 1941)

Personal information
- Full name: Antônio Lopes dos Santos
- Date of birth: June 12, 1941 (age 85)
- Place of birth: Rio de Janeiro, Brazil

Senior career*
Years	Team	Apps	(Gls)
1958–1961	Olaria		
1961–1962	Bonsucesso		

Managerial career
- 1980: Olaria
- 1981: América
- 1981–1983: Vasco da Gama
- 1983–1985: Kuwait
- 1985–1986: Vasco da Gama
- 1986–1987: Fluminense
- 1987: Flamengo
- 1988: Ivory Coast
- 1988: Sport Recife
- 1988–1989: Al Wasl
- 1989–1990: Portuguesa
- 1990: Belenenses
- 1991: Vasco da Gama
- 1992: Internacional
- 1993: Santos
- 1993: Portuguesa
- 1994: Internacional
- 1994: Al-Hilal
- 1995: Cruzeiro
- 1995–1996: Cerro Porteño
- 1996: Paraná
- 1997–2000: Vasco da Gama
- 2000: Grêmio
- 2000: Atlético Paranaense
- 2002–2003: Vasco da Gama
- 2004: Coritiba
- 2005: Atlético Paranaense
- 2005: Corinthians
- 2006: Goiás
- 2006: Fluminense
- 2007: Atlético Paranaense
- 2008: Vasco da Gama
- 2009: Atlético Paranaense
- 2010: Avaí
- 2010–2011: Vitória
- 2011: América Mineiro
- 2011: Atlético Paranaense
Medal record
Men's football
Representing Kuwait (as manager)
AFC Asian Cup
Bronze medal – third place	1984
- * Club domestic league appearances and goals

Antônio Lopes dos Santos (born 12 June 1941) is a Brazilian football head coach and former footballer.

Antônio Lopes was the assistant manager of the Brazil national football team, managed by Émerson Leão, in 2000. He was also the assistant manager of the Brazil national team, managed by Luiz Felipe Scolari, during the successful 2002 FIFA World Cup campaign.

He is the coach with the most major trophies won for Vasco da Gama. In July 2026, Vasco da Gama honored him by naming a pitch at its training center after him.

== Playing career ==
He played for Olaria from 1958 to 1961, and played for Bonsucesso in 1962.

== Coaching career ==
During his career, he managed several clubs, including foreign clubs like Al Wasl of the United Arab Emirates, Belenenses of Portugal, Cerro Porteño of Paraguay, and Brazilian clubs like Fluminense, Flamengo, Sport Recife, Portuguesa, Internacional, Santos, Atlético Paranaense, Grêmio, Vasco da Gama, Coritiba, Paraná, Corinthians and Goiás.

In 2005, he was the manager of Corinthians, replacing Márcio Bittencourt, during most of the Campeonato Brasileiro Série A season. The club, with Antônio Lopes as its head coach, won the competition.

On March 9, 2010, Atlético Paranaense executive board had decided to suddenly dismiss the coach for undisclosed reasons and despite the fact that the team's results were satisfactory, so far (six wins, four draws and only one loss). Leandro Niehues has been named interim coach until a full-time replacement is found.

On July 12, 2011, Antônio Lopes was hired as América-MG's head coach.

== Personal life ==
Before being a football head coach, he worked as a chief police officer in Rio de Janeiro city.

His son, Júnior Lopes, is also a football manager.

== Managerial statistics ==
As of match played 20 January 2025

Managerial record by team and tenure
Team	Nat	From	To	Record							
Team	Nat	From	To	G	W	D	L	GF	GA	GD	Win %
Olaria	(Brazil)	January 1980	December 1980	13	2	4	7	8	18	−10	15.38
America-RJ	(Brazil)	7 January 1981	3 February 1981	7	3	1	3	6	7	−1	42.86
Vasco da Gama	(Brazil)	4 February 1981	10 May 1983	110	60	31	19	197	97	+100	54.55
Kuwait	(Kuwait)	1 March 1983	1 April 1985	17	5	6	6	13	15	−2	29.41
Vasco da Gama	(Brazil)	3 April 1985	2 January 1986	37	13	14	10	55	37	+18	35.14
Fluminense	(Brazil)	9 January 1986	14 April 1987	64	36	14	14	75	40	+35	56.25
Flamengo	(Brazil)	19 April 1987	14 September 1987	20	11	6	3	23	13	+10	55.00
Ivory Coast	(Ivory Coast)	1 March 1988	21 March 1988	3	0	3	0	2	2	+0	0.00
Sport Recife	(Brazil)	25 March 1988	30 June 1988	15	10	4	1	27	7	+20	66.67
Al Wasl	(United Arab Emirates)	30 June 1988	1 June 1989	22	13	5	4	44	18	+26	59.09
Portuguesa	(Brazil)	6 June 1989	29 October 1990	70	18	36	16	78	66	+12	25.71
Belenenses	(Portugal)	1 November 1990	6 January 1991	10	3	3	4	9	10	−1	30.00
Vasco da Gama	(Brazil)	10 January 1991	10 December 1991	45	18	19	8	72	45	+27	40.00
Internacional	(Brazil)	24 January 1992	28 December 1992	58	29	18	11	89	45	+44	50.00
Santos FC	(Brazil)	24 June 1993	14 October 1993	16	7	4	5	22	19	+3	43.75
Portuguesa	(Brazil)	15 October 1993	16 November 1993	6	3	2	1	8	5	+3	50.00
Internacional	(Brazil)	10 January 1994	29 June 1994	25	15	8	2	41	13	+28	60.00
Al-Hilal	(Saudi Arabia)	30 June 1994	29 December 1994	11	6	3	2	20	8	+12	54.55
Cruzeiro	(Brazil)	1 February 1995	26 February 1995	6	2	1	3	7	3	+4	33.33
Cerro Porteño	(Paraguay)	1 July 1995	31 May 1996	43	23	11	9	77	41	+36	53.49
Paraná	(Brazil)	6 August 1996	8 September 1996	9	2	1	6	7	16	−9	22.22
Vasco da Gama	(Brazil)	1 January 1997	12 January 2000	196	106	44	46	332	203	+129	54.08
Grêmio	(Brazil)	1 April 2000	7 August 2000	20	9	6	5	26	23	+3	45.00
Athletico Paranaense	(Brazil)	1 October 2000	26 November 2000	11	5	2	4	14	11	+3	45.45
Vasco da Gama	(Brazil)	1 July 2002	17 July 2003	41	19	11	11	69	50	+19	46.34
Coritiba	(Brazil)	20 December 2003	5 May 2005	94	43	28	23	130	94	+36	45.74
Athletico Paranaense	(Brazil)	24 May 2005	25 September 2005	31	12	9	10	53	48	+5	38.71
Corinthians	(Brazil)	26 September 2005	13 March 2006	36	19	7	10	74	42	+32	52.78
Goiás	(Brazil)	12 May 2006	14 August 2006	11	3	2	6	11	16	−5	27.27
Fluminense	(Brazil)	23 August 2006	29 September 2006	10	1	5	4	10	14	−4	10.00
Athletico Paranaense	(Brazil)	12 June 2007	20 August 2007	16	3	7	6	23	24	−1	18.75
Vasco da Gama	(Brazil)	31 March 2008	7 August 2008	33	13	8	12	58	42	+16	39.39
Athletico Paranaense	(Brazil)	8 August 2008	30 November 2009	90	38	20	32	131	118	+13	42.22
Avaí	(Brazil)	6 July 2010	20 September 2010	16	4	5	7	21	25	−4	25.00
Vitória	(Brazil)	7 October 2010	16 May 2011	34	16	10	8	54	34	+20	47.06
América Mineiro	(Brazil)	12 July 2011	1 August 2011	4	0	2	2	2	8	−6	0.00
Athletico Paranaense	(Brazil)	2 September 2011	4 March 2012	31	15	7	9	49	34	+15	48.39
Career total				1,282	585	368	329	1,921	1,271	+650	45.63

== Honours ==
=== As manager ===
Vasco da Gama

- Campeonato Carioca: 1982, 1998, 2003
- Campeonato Brasileiro Série A: 1997
- Copa Libertadores: 1998
- Torneio Rio–São Paulo: 1999

Sport Recife

- Campeonato Pernambucano: 1988

Internacional

- Campeonato Gaúcho: 1992
- Copa do Brasil: 1992

Paraná

- Campeonato Paranaense: 1996

Coritiba

- Campeonato Paranaense: 2004

Corinthians

- Campeonato Brasileiro Série A: 2005

Individual

- Placar magazine's manager of year: 2005

== See also ==
- List of football managers with the most matches
