= Paulo Amaral =

Brazilian footballer and coach (1923–2008)

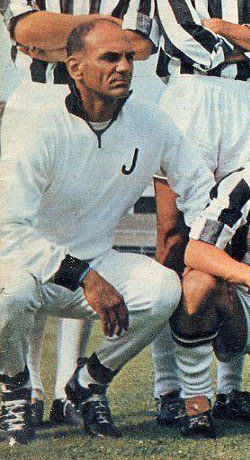
- Amaral at Juventus in 1963

Personal information
- Full name: Paulo Lima Amaral
- Date of birth: 18 October 1923
- Place of birth: Rio de Janeiro, Brazil
- Date of death: 1 May 2008 (aged 84)
- Place of death: Rio de Janeiro, Brazil

Senior career*
Years	Team	Apps	(Gls)
1942–1945	Flamengo	18	(1)
1946–1948	Botafogo		

Managerial career
- 1959–1961: Botafogo
- 1961–1962: Vasco da Gama
- 1962–1963: Juventus
- 1964: Corinthians
- 1964: Genoa
- 1966: Atlético Mineiro
- 1966: Brazil (assistant)
- 1967–1968: Bahia
- 1969–1971: Fluminense
- 1971: Vasco da Gama
- 1971–1972: Porto
- 1973: Botafogo
- 1973: Paraguay
- 1974–1975: America (RJ)
- 1976: Botafogo
- 1976–1977: Remo
- 1978: Al-Hilal
- 1978: Guarani
- * Club domestic league appearances and goals

Paulo Lima Amaral (18 October 1923 – 1 May 2008) was a Brazilian footballer and coach. He is most famous for his time as a coach of Juventus of Italy. He was also a Fitness Coach of the Brazilian 1958 FIFA World Cup-winning team.
