= Carlos Volante =

Argentine footballer

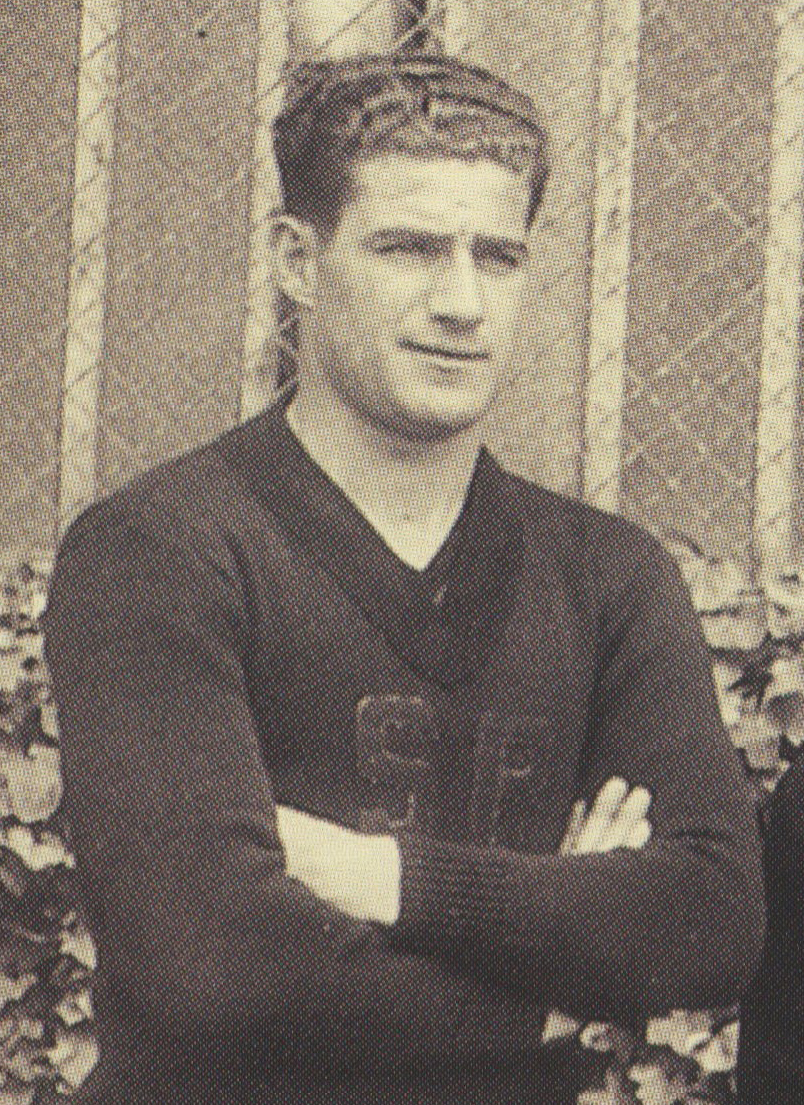

Personal information
- Full name: Carlos Martín Volante
- Date of birth: November 11, 1905
- Place of birth: Lanús, Argentina
- Date of death: October 9, 1987 (aged 81)
- Place of death: Milan, Italy
- Position: Defensive midfielder

Youth career
- 1923–1924: Lanús

Senior career*
Years	Team	Apps	(Gls)
1924–1926	Lanús	11	(0)
1926	CA General San Martín	3	(0)
1928	Platense		
1929–1930	San Lorenzo		
1930–1931	→ Excursionistas	0	(0)
1931–1932	Napoli	25	(0)
1932–1933	Livorno	32	(0)
1933–1934	Torino	16	(0)
1934–1935	Rennes	22	(1)
1935–1936	Olympique Lillois	24	(1)
1937–1938	CA Paris		
1938–1943	Flamengo	100	(3)

International career
1928–1930	Argentina	2	(0)

Managerial career
- 1945–1946: Lanús
- 1946–1948: Internacional
- 1953–1955: Vitória
- 1959–1960: Bahia
- * Club domestic league appearances and goals

Carlos Martín Volante (November 11, 1905 – October 9, 1987) was an Argentine football defensive midfielder, who played in Argentine, Brazilian, French and Italian clubs.

== Career ==
Volante begun his youth career at small clubs in Lanús. In 1923, he signed Club Atlético Lanús, where he started his senior career on the following year. He would still serve in the military and then have a brief stint at Club Atlético General San Martín before joining Platense. In 1929 he transferred to San Lorenzo, with which he reached the semifinals of the local league. Between 1930 and 1931, Volante was loaned for free to Vélez Sársfield to play in the team's Pan-American tour. Thereafter, he played four games in Excursionistas Two years later he signed a deal with Napoli. He also played for Livorno and Torino in Italy, where he would stay until 1934 when he moved to French football.

Once there, Volante took part in the historical Rennes 1934–35 squad and also played for Olympique Lillois and CA Paris. During 1938 FIFA World Cup, held in France, he was hired by Brazil National Football Team to work as a massagist. The fear from World War II and a nice relationship built with Brazilian players made Volante transfer to Flamengo, where he would side with Brazilian stars Domingos da Guia and Leonidas. His defensive prowess led the defensive midfielder position to be called "volante" in Brazil.

Volante retired in 1943 to start a coaching career. He won the 1959 Taça Brasil for Bahia.

== Honours ==
=== Club ===
Livorno

- Serie B: 1933

Rennes

- Coupe de France: Runners-up 1935

Olympique Lillois

- Championnat de France: Runners-up 1936

Flamengo

- Campeonato Carioca: 1939, 1942, 1943

Bahia

- Campeonato Brasileiro (as manager): 1959
