= Joel Santana =

Brazilian footballer & coach (born 1955)

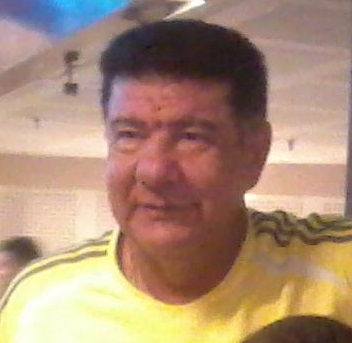

Personal information
- Full name: Joel Natalino Santana
- Date of birth: 25 December 1955 (age 70)
- Place of birth: Rio de Janeiro, Brazil
- Position: Defender

Senior career*
Years	Team	Apps	(Gls)
1971–1972	Vasco da Gama	37	(11)
1973	Olaria	29	(8)
1974–1975	Vasco da Gama	18	(1)
1976–1980	América de Natal	148	(45)
Total		232	(65)

Managerial career
- 1981–1986: Al Wasl
- 1986–1987: Vasco da Gama
- 1988–1990: Al Nassr
- 1991: América
- 1991: Al-Hilal
- 1992–1993: Vasco da Gama
- 1994: Bahia
- 1995: Fluminense
- 1996: Flamengo
- 1997: Corinthians
- 1997–1998: Botafogo
- 1998: Flamengo
- 1999–2000: Bahia
- 2000: Botafogo
- 2000–2001: Vasco da Gama
- 2001–2002: Coritiba
- 2002–2003: Vitória
- 2003: Fluminense
- 2004: Guarani
- 2004: Internacional
- 2004–2005: Vasco da Gama
- 2005: Brasiliense
- 2005: Flamengo
- 2006: Vegalta Sendai
- 2007: Fluminense
- 2007–2008: Flamengo
- 2008–2009: South Africa
- 2010–2011: Botafogo
- 2011: Cruzeiro
- 2011–2012: Bahia
- 2012: Flamengo
- 2013: Bahia
- 2014: Vasco da Gama
- 2017: Boavista
- * Club domestic league appearances and goals as of February 5, 2012 ‡ National team caps and goals as of February 5, 2010

Joel Natalino Santana (born 25 December 1955) is a Brazilian football coach and former player. He was recently in charge of Vasco da Gama in 2014.

== Biography ==
Born in Rio de Janeiro, Santana played his entire career as a central defender in his native Brazil in the 1970s. He became best known as a player at Vasco da Gama, but failed to earn a cap with the national team. In 1980, he retired as a player and moved on to club management with Al Wasl in the United Arab Emirates. While much of his management career has been with Brazilian clubs, Santana has also coached clubs in Saudi Arabia and Vegalta Sendai in Japan's J-League.

Santana is one of the few head coaches to win Brazil's Campeonato Carioca with each of the four big clubs (Botafogo, Flamengo, Fluminense, and Vasco da Gama). His playing style has been characterized as defensive, with the main objective of preventing the opposition from scoring.

In 2004, Santana successfully kept Vasco da Gama from relegation to the second division of Campeonato Brasileiro in his fourth stint as club's head coach. A year later, he was hired by Flamengo to also save them from relegation, which he did successfully. Having established a reputation as an "escape artist" capable of rescuing teams from relegation, he returned to Flamengo in 2007 with the same goal. He not only prevented relegation, but lead the Rio state club to a surprising third place finish to qualify for the 2008 Copa Libertadores.

In April 2008, Santana replaced his countryman, Carlos Alberto Parreira, as the coach of the South Africa national football team following a recommendation from Parreira himself who left the job for personal reasons. In October 2009 Santana was dismissed from the position due to the poor results achieved by the team; most notably a streak of eight defeats in his last nine games as coach of the Bafana Bafana.

Joel Santana returned for his fifth spell as Flamengo's head coach on 3 February 2012. On 23 July 2012, Santana, after two consecutive losses against Corinthians and Cruzeiro, was fired from Flamengo.

On 8 April 2013, after Jorginho's dismissal, Santana was hired for Bahia. He worked for fourth time at the Tricolor from Salvador.

Santana is considered to be one of the most well-known managers in Brazilian football history, winning many trophies with many big clubs like Flamengo, Vasco da Gama and Fluminense especially state leagues. He is also well-known for being one a few managers to have managed more than 1,000 games during his managerial career.

Santana retired in 2017, after managing Boavista at the end of the Carioca Championship.

== Acting issues ==
In 2012, after a video featuring a post-match interview given by Santana during the 2009 FIFA Confederations Cup when he was in charge of South Africa (following the 0–0 draw against Iraq in the opening game) went viral as a result of his poor English language skills, he acted in a commercial for Pepsi, saying code-switching phrases such as "Ele quer saber se your dog has a phone" ("He wants to know if your dog has a phone number" - a tongue-in-cheek Brazilian Portuguese slang expression used when picking up women) and "Me dá uma Pepsi. Pode to be?" ("Can you give me a Pepsi? Can it be?" [sic]).

In 2013, he became the star of another commercial: an ad series for Head & Shoulders, again making light of his poor English. Happy with this and the former success, Santana told Brazilian sports channel SporTV about his experience in South Africa: "[Speaking English publicly] was indeed risky. The English-speaking press, very nobly, said: 'We don't care whether you are saying it right or wrong, mate, your feelings are actually what we want to know about.' And I think, in football, one needs to have feelings, otherwise, if one just philosophizes, one will never go further. Because of this, at that time, I risked myself. It turned out to be a plus, because I figured out a way to be a good pitchman."

== Managerial statistics ==
(as of 10 May 2024)

Team	Nation	From	To	Record							
Team	Nation	From	To	G	W	D	L	F	A	GD	Win %
Al Wasl	United Arab Emirates	30 July 1981	30 June 1986	119	80	15	24	200	106	+94	67.23
Vasco da Gama	Brazil	1 August 1986	24 November 1987	63	28	18	17	97	48	+49	44.44
Al Nassr	Saudi Arabia	30 June 1988	30 May 1990	51	31	11	9	88	42	+46	60.78
America-RJ	Brazil	17 January 1991	30 May 1991	20	5	8	9	20	17	+3	25
Al-Hilal	Saudi Arabia	30 June 1991	30 December 1991	11	3	4	3	14	10	+4	27.27
Vasco da Gama	Brazil	10 January 1992	29 December 1993	100	56	28	16	175	83	+92	56
Bahia	Brazil	1 February 1994	14 December 1994	46	22	11	13	59	51	+8	47.83
Fluminense	Brazil	14 January 1995	28 December 1995	53	27	17	9	74	41	+33	56.82
CR Flamengo	Brazil	1 February 1996	20 December 1996	79	43	21	15	111	63	+48	54.43
Corinthians	Brazil	8 June 1997	16 December 1997	25	8	5	12	23	27	-4	32
CR Flamengo	Brazil	8 January 1998	15 September 1998	26	13	9	4	42	36	+6	50
Bahia	Brazil	10 January 1999	2 January 2000	55	27	19	9	101	56	+45	49.09
Botafogo	Brazil	2 January 2000	7 September 2000	31	16	7	8	56	35	+21	51.61
Vasco da Gama	Brazil	10 September 2000	17 December 2001	68	34	17	17	137	87	+49	51.61
Coritiba	Brazil	19 December 2001	8 April 2002	14	5	2	7	26	30	-4	35.71
Vitória	Brazil	1 May 2002	24 March 2003	55	30	9	16	106	71	+35	54.55
Fluminense	Brazil	18 July 2003	1 October 2003	18	3	5	10	15	30	-15	16.67
Guarani	Brazil	5 January 2004	8 May 2004	21	3	11	6	20	27	-7	14.29
Internacional	Brazil	1 July 2004	2 September 2004	18	5	4	9	26	26	+0	27.78
Vasco da Gama	Brazil	27 September 2004	20 April 2005	32	13	10	9	53	44	+11	40.63
Brasiliense	Brazil	1 June 2005	23 October 2005	26	14	5	7	47	34	+13	53.85
CR Flamengo	Brazil	24 October 2005	30 December 2005	9	6	3	0	18	7	+11	66.67
Vegalta Sendai	Japan	1 February 2006	4 December 2006	50	22	14	14	76	44	+32	44
CR Flamengo	Brazil	30 July 2007	4 May 2008	54	35	7	12	103	62	+41	64.81
South Africa	South Africa	4 May 2008	14 October 2009	27	10	3	14	25	30	-5	37.04
Botafogo	Brazil	26 January 2010	22 March 2011	72	38	22	12	130	80	+50	52.78
Cruzeiro	Brazil	20 June 2011	2 September 2011	15	8	0	7	24	18	+6	53.33
Bahia	Brazil	4 September 2011	2 February 2012	23	10	5	8	33	29	+4	43.48
CR Flamengo	Brazil	3 February 2012	23 July 2012	29	15	5	9	51	40	+11	51.72
Bahia	Brazil	8 April 2013	13 May 2013	9	2	4	3	9	13	-4	22.22
Vasco da Gama	Brazil	7 September 2014	1 December 2014	18	7	7	4	21	17	+4	38.89
Boavista	Brazil	1 January 2017	6 May 2017	11	3	3	5	9	13	-4	27.27
Total				1,258	623	312	323	1,988	1,327	+661	49.52

== Honours ==
=== Player honours ===
América de Natal

- Campeonato Potiguar: 1974, 1977, 1979, 1980

Vasco da Gama

- Campeonato Carioca: 1970
- Campeonato Brasileiro Série A: 1974

=== Managerial honours ===
Al Wasl FC

- UAE Pro League: 1982, 1983, 1985

Al Nassr

- Saudi Pro League: 1989

Bahia

- Campeonato Baiano: 1994, 1999

Botafogo

- Campeonato Carioca: 1997, 2010

Flamengo

- Campeonato Carioca: 1996, 2008

Fluminense

- Campeonato Carioca: 1995

South Africa national team

- 2009 FIFA Confederations Cup (4th place)

Vasco da Gama

- Campeonato Carioca: 1992, 1993
- Copa Mercosur: 2000
- Campeonato Brasileiro Série A: 2000

Vitória

- Campeonato Baiano: 2003
- Supercampeonato Baiano: 2002

== See also ==
- List of football managers with the most matches
