= Ramón Platero =

Uruguayan football manager (1894–1950)

Personal information
- Full name: Ramón Perdomo Platero
- Date of birth: 23 December 1894
- Place of birth: Canelones, Uruguay
- Date of death: 5 August 1950 (aged 55)
- Place of death: Santos, Brazil

Managerial career
- Years: Team
- 1917–1919: Uruguay
- 1919: Fluminense
- 1920–1921: Santos
- 1921–1922: Flamengo
- 1922–1926: Vasco da Gama
- 1925: Brazil
- 1926–1927: Palestra Itália
- 1927–1928: Botafogo
- 1929–1930: Santos
- 1930: São Paulo
- 1935: Palestra Itália
- 1938–1939: Palestra Itália
- 1939–1940: Vasco da Gama
- 1940: São Paulo

Ramón Perdomo Platero (23 December 1894 – 5 August 1950) was a Uruguayan football manager. He coached Uruguay national team in their successful 1917 South American Championship campaign as his first work. He is also famous in Brazil for being the first coach in the history of Flamengo in 1921 and Vasco da Gama in 1922, even coaching both teams at the same time. He also coached Botafogo, Fluminense, Palestra Italia, Santos, São Paulo and he was the first foreigner to coach the Brazil national team.

== Honours ==
Fluminense

- Campeonato Carioca: 1919

Flamengo

- Torneio Início Carioca: 1922

Vasco da Gama

- Campeonato Carioca: 1923, 1924
- LMDT Championship Group B: 1922
- Torneio Início Carioca: 1926

Palestra Italia

- Campeonato Paulista: 1926
- Torneio Início Paulista: 1927

São Paulo

- Torneio Início Paulista: 1940

Uruguay

- South American Championship: 1917
- Copa Newton: 1917
