= Marcos Valadares =

Brazilian football manager (born 1977)

Personal information
- Full name: Marcos Gomes Valadares
- Date of birth: 23 July 1977 (age 49)
- Place of birth: São Paulo, Brazil

Managerial career
- Years: Team
- 2005–2006: Santa Cruz-MG
- 2006: Santa Tereza
- 2006–2008: América Mineiro (youth)
- 2008–2009: Amparense U17
- 2009–2010: Ipatinga (youth)
- 2010–2012: Cruzeiro U15
- 2012–2013: Fluminense U17
- 2014–2015: Fluminense U20
- 2015: Palmeiras U20
- 2015–2017: Cruzeiro U20
- 2018: Patrocinense (assistant)
- 2018–2019: Vasco da Gama U20
- 2019: Vasco da Gama (interim)
- 2020–2022: Atlético Mineiro U20
- 2022: Ceará U20
- 2023: Ceará (assistant)
- 2024: Valeriodoce
- 2024: Contagem
- 2025: Ipatinga
- 2025: Coimbra

Marcos Gomes Valadares (born 23 July 1977) is a Brazilian football coach.

== Career ==
Born in São Paulo, Valadares was a Federal University of Minas Gerais alumni and started his career in 2004 as Olympic de Barbacena's fitness coach. In January of the following year, he was named manager of Belo Horizonte-based side Santa Cruz.

In 2006, after a short spell at Associação Esportiva Santa Tereza, Valadares joined América Mineiro's youth setup. In 2008 he left the club, and was appointed manager of the under-17 side of Amparense FC, but moved to Ipatinga in the following year.

In 2010, Valadares was appointed manager of Cruzeiro's under-15 team. He moved to Fluminense in 2012, being in charge of the club's under-17 and under-20 squads.

On 25 February 2015, Valadares joined Palmeiras and was named manager of the under-20s. In September, however, he returned to Cruzeiro now as under-20 manager.

Valadares left Cruzeiro in April 2017, On 6 March 2018, after a 17-day spell as Patrocinense's assistant manager, he was named Vasco da Gama's under-20 manager.

On 21 April 2019, after Alberto Valentim's dismissal, Valadares was named interim manager of the first team. His first professional match occurred three days later, a 2–1 Copa do Brasil home win against Santos.

In 2020, he took charge of Atlético Mineiro's under-20 squad.
