= Coronel (footballer) =

Brazilian footballer (1935–2019)

Personal information
- Full name: Antônio Evanil da Silva
- Date of birth: 27 January 1935
- Place of birth: Quatis, Rio de Janeiro, Brazil
- Date of death: 5 December 2019 (aged 84)
- Place of death: Porto Real, Rio de Janeiro, Brazil
- Position: Central defender

Senior career*
Years	Team	Apps	(Gls)
1955-1964	Vasco da Gama		
1964-1965	Tupi		
1965-1966	Ferroviária		
1966	Nacional Atlético Clube		
1967-1971	Unión Magdalena		

International career
1959	Brazil	8	(0)
- * Club domestic league appearances and goals

Antônio Evanil da Silva (27 January 1935 – 5 December 2019), known as Coronel, was a Brazilian footballer who played as a central defender. He made eight appearances for the Brazil national team in 1959. He was also part of Brazil's squad for the 1959 South American Championship that took place in Argentina. He died on 5 December 2019, at the age of 84.

== International career ==
Coronel was selected in Brazil's squad for the 1959 South American Championship (Argentina) and played six games during the tournament. The game against Peru on 10 March was his first cap with Brazil.

The friendly game against Chile on 20 September 1959 was his eighth and last cap with Brazil.
