= 2003 Campeonato Carioca =

Campeonato Carioca
- Season: 2003
- Champions: Vasco da Gama
- Relegated: Volta Redonda
- Copa do Brasil: Vasco da Gama; Flamengo; Fluminense; Americano; Botafogo; Bangu
- Matches: 72
- Goals: 193 (2.68 per match)
- Top goalscorer: Fábio Bala (Fluminense) – 10 goals
- Biggest home win: Fluminense 5–0 Botafogo (February 23, 2003)
- Biggest away win: Americano 1–4 Flamengo (January 26, 2003); Flamengo 0–3 Fluminense (February 9, 2003)
- Highest scoring: Botafogo 5–2 Volta Redonda (February 19, 2003)

The 2003 edition of the Campeonato Carioca kicked off on January 16 and ended on March 23, 2003. It is the official tournament organized by FFERJ (Federação de Futebol do Estado do Rio de Janeiro, or Rio de Janeiro State Football Federation. Only clubs based in the Rio de Janeiro State are allowed to play. Twelve teams contested this edition. Vasco da Gama won the title for the 22nd time. Volta Redonda was relegated.

== System ==
The tournament was played in two stages:

- Taça Guanabara: The 12 participating clubs played each other once in a single round-robin format. The top four teams advanced to the Taça Rio.
- Taça Rio: The four qualified teams competed in a knockout stage to determine the overall champion.

== Championship ==
=== First stage ===
Pos	Team	Pld	W	D	L	GF	GA	GD	Pts	Qualification or relegation
1	Vasco da Gama	11	6	4	1	23	11	+12	22	Qualified
2	Flamengo	11	7	1	3	21	15	+6	22	Qualified
3	Fluminense	11	5	5	1	25	13	+12	20	Qualified
4	Americano	11	6	2	3	16	12	+4	20	Qualified
5	Botafogo	11	5	2	4	18	20	−2	17	
6	Bangu	11	4	3	4	10	12	−2	15	
7	América	11	4	1	6	10	11	−1	13	
8	Olaria	11	3	2	6	11	14	−3	11	
9	Madureira	11	3	2	6	11	17	−6	11	
10	Friburguense	11	2	5	4	10	13	−3	11	
11	Cabofriense	11	2	4	5	11	18	−7	10	
12	Volta Redonda	11	1	5	5	8	17	−9	8	Relegated

Updated to match(es) played on March 23, 2003. Source: RSSSF.com
Rules for classification: 1) points; 2) wins; 3) goal difference; 4) number of goals scored.

=== Semifinals ===
Team 1	Agg.	Team 2	1st leg	2nd leg
Fluminense	5–1	Flamengo	1–1	4–0
Americano	1–6	Vasco da Gama	1–4	0–2

=== Finals ===
Team 1	Agg.	Team 2	1st leg	2nd leg
Fluminense	2–4	Vasco da Gama	1–2	1–2
