= 1929 Campeonato Carioca =

Campeonato Carioca
- Season: 1929
- Champions: Vasco da Gama
- Matches played: 113
- Goals scored: 458 (4.05 per match)
- Top goalscorer: Russinho (Vasco da Gama); Telê (América) – 23 goals
- Biggest home win: América 11-2 Botafogo (November 3, 1929)
- Biggest away win: Bonsucesso 0-7 América (April 22, 1929)
- Highest scoring: América 11-2 Botafogo (November 3, 1929)

The 1929 Campeonato Carioca, the 24th edition of that championship, kicked off on April 7, 1929 and ended on November 24, 1929. It was organized by AMEA (Associação Metropolitana de Esportes Atléticos, or Metropolitan Athletic Sports Association). Eleven teams participated. Vasco da Gama won the title for the 3rd time. No teams were relegated.

== Participating teams ==
After Villa Isabel left the league, AMEA invited Bonsucesso, winner of the last three editions of the Second level to join the first level.

Club	Home location	Previous season
América	Tijuca, Rio de Janeiro	1st
Andarahy	Andaraí, Rio de Janeiro	8th
Bangu	Bangu, Rio de Janeiro	7th
Botafogo	Botafogo, Rio de Janeiro	3rd
Bonsucesso	Bonsucesso, Rio de Janeiro	1st (Second level)
Brasil	Urca, Rio de Janeiro	10th
Flamengo	Flamengo, Rio de Janeiro	4th
Fluminense	Laranjeiras, Rio de Janeiro	5th
São Cristóvão	São Cristóvão, Rio de Janeiro	6th
Syrio e Libanez	Tijuca, Rio de Janeiro	9th
Vasco da Gama	São Cristóvão, Rio de Janeiro	2nd

== System ==
The tournament would be disputed in a double round-robin format, with the team with the most points winning the title.

== Championship ==
Pos	Team	Pld	W	D	L	GF	GA	GD	Pts	Qualification or relegation
1	América	20	15	3	2	66	21	+45	33	Playoffs
2	Vasco da Gama	20	14	5	1	54	23	+31	33	Playoffs
3	São Cristóvão	20	9	8	3	40	29	+11	26	
4	Fluminense	20	11	3	6	35	23	+12	25	
5	Bangu	20	10	5	5	45	34	+11	25	
6	Botafogo	20	8	4	8	55	54	+1	20	
7	Bonsucesso	20	5	5	10	34	55	−21	15	
8	Andarahy	20	5	4	11	36	54	−18	14	
9	Syrio e Libanez	20	5	3	12	40	50	−10	13	
10	Flamengo	20	4	4	12	26	42	−16	12	
11	Brasil	20	1	2	17	20	66	−46	4	

Updated to match(es) played on November 3, 1929. Source: RSSSF.com
Rules for classification: 1) points; 2) goal difference; 3) wins; 4) number of goals scored.

=== Playoffs ===
10 November 1929 Playoffs	Vasco da Gama	0 – 0	América	Laranjeiras, Rio de Janeiro
				Referee: Jorge Marinho

14 November 1929 Playoffs	Vasco da Gama	1 – 1	América	Laranjeiras, Rio de Janeiro
	Russinho		Oswaldo	Referee: Jorge Marinho

24 November 1929 Playoffs	Vasco da Gama	5 – 0	América	Laranjeiras, Rio de Janeiro
	Russinho; Mário Mattos; Sant'Anna			Referee: Laís
