= 1970 Campeonato Carioca =

Campeonato Carioca
- Season: 1970
- Champions: Vasco da Gama
- Torneio Roberto Gomes Pedrosa: Vasco da Gama; Flamengo; Fluminense; América; Botafogo
- Matches played: 94
- Goals scored: 238 (2.53 per match)
- Top goalscorer: Flávio (Fluminense) - 18 goals
- Biggest home win: Fluminense 4-0 Bonsucesso (July 11, 1970); Fluminense 5-1 Madureira (August 29, 1970); América 4-0 Olaria (September 7, 1970)
- Biggest away win: Bonsucesso 1-5 Flamengo (August 9, 1970); Campo Grande 0-4 Vasco da Gama (September 10, 1970); América 0-4 Flamengo (September 10, 1970)
- Highest scoring: Fluminense 6-3 Campo Grande (June 28, 1970)

The 1970 edition of the Campeonato Carioca kicked off on June 27, 1970 and ended on September 20, 1970. It was organized by FCF (Federação Carioca de Futebol, or Carioca Football Federation). Twelve teams participated. Vasco da Gama won the title for the 13th time. no teams were relegated.

== System ==
The tournament would be divided in two stages:

- First round: The twelve teams all played in a single round-robin format against each other. The eight best teams qualified to the Second round.
- Final phase: The remaining eight teams all played in a single round-robin format against each other. The team with the most points won the title.

== Championship ==
=== First round ===
Pos	Team	Pld	W	D	L	GF	GA	GD	Pts	Qualification or relegation
1	Fluminense	11	8	2	1	25	8	+17	18	Qualified
2	América	11	8	1	2	27	13	+14	17	Qualified
3	Vasco da Gama	11	7	3	1	15	8	+7	17	Qualified
4	Botafogo	11	6	3	2	19	8	+11	15	Qualified
5	Flamengo	11	6	2	3	15	8	+7	14	Qualified
6	Olaria	11	4	5	2	11	8	+3	13	Qualified
7	Madureira	11	2	4	5	9	17	−8	8	Qualified
8	Campo Grande	11	1	6	4	10	20	−10	8	Qualified
9	Bangu	11	2	3	6	14	20	−6	7	
10	São Cristóvão	11	1	5	5	5	14	−9	7	
11	Bonsucesso	11	1	4	6	8	17	−9	6	
12	Portuguesa	11	0	2	9	6	23	−17	2	

Updated to match(es) played on August 16, 1970. Source: RSSSF.com
Rules for classification: 1) points; 2) goal difference; 3) wins; 4) number of goals scored.

=== Final round ===
Pos	Team	Pld	W	D	L	GF	GA	GR	Pts	Qualification or relegation
1	Vasco da Gama	7	6	0	1	15	6	2.500	12	Champions
2	Fluminense	7	4	2	1	12	4	3.000	10	
3	Botafogo	7	4	1	2	10	5	2.000	9	
4	América	7	2	3	2	10	8	1.250	7	
5	Flamengo	7	3	1	3	11	9	1.222	7	
6	Olaria	7	2	2	3	8	12	0.667	6	
7	Madureira	7	1	1	5	4	13	0.308	3	
8	Campo Grande	7	1	0	6	4	21	0.190	2	

Updated to match(es) played on September 20, 1970. Source: RSSSF.com
Rules for classification: 1) points; 2) goal difference; 3) goal average; 4) wins.

== Taça Guanabara ==
=== First phase ===
==== Group A ====
Pos	Team	Pld	W	D	L	GF	GA	GD	Pts	Qualification or relegation
1	América	5	4	1	0	7	1	+6	9	Qualified
2	Botafogo	5	3	1	1	6	3	+3	7	Qualified
3	Flamengo	5	2	1	2	6	3	+3	5	Qualified
4	Bonsucesso	5	2	1	2	5	4	+1	5	Qualified
5	Portuguesa	5	1	2	2	6	7	−1	4	
6	São Cristóvão	5	0	0	5	2	14	−12	0	

Updated to match(es) played on April 4, 1970. Source: RSSSF.com
Rules for classification: 1) points; 2) goal difference; 3) wins; 4) number of goals scored.

==== Group B ====
Pos	Team	Pld	W	D	L	GF	GA	GD	Pts	Qualification or relegation
1	Fluminense	5	3	2	0	8	5	+3	8	Qualified
2	Bangu	5	3	1	1	7	3	+4	7	Qualified
3	Olaria	5	2	2	1	5	3	+2	6	Qualified
4	Vasco da Gama	5	2	1	2	4	5	−1	5	Qualified
5	Madureira	5	0	3	2	2	4	−2	3	
6	Campo Grande	5	0	1	4	3	9	−6	1	

Updated to match(es) played on April 4, 1970. Source: RSSSF.com
Rules for classification: 1) points; 2) goal difference; 3) wins; 4) number of goals scored.

=== Second phase ===
==== Group A ====
Pos	Team	Pld	W	D	L	GF	GA	GD	Pts	Qualification or relegation
1	América	4	2	1	1	8	3	+5	5	Qualified
2	Flamengo	4	2	1	1	2	4	−2	5	Qualified
3	Botafogo	4	0	4	0	1	1	0	4	Qualified
4	Bonsucesso	4	0	0	4	1	8	−7	0	

Updated to match(es) played on May 3, 1970. Source: RSSSF.com
Rules for classification: 1) points; 2) goal difference; 3) wins; 4) number of goals scored.

==== Group B ====
Pos	Team	Pld	W	D	L	GF	GA	GD	Pts	Qualification or relegation
1	Vasco da Gama	4	2	2	0	2	0	+2	6	Qualified
2	Bangu	4	2	1	1	6	4	+2	5	Qualified
3	Fluminense	4	1	2	1	7	4	+3	4	Qualified
4	Olaria	4	1	1	2	1	4	−3	3	

Updated to match(es) played on May 3, 1970. Source: RSSSF.com
Rules for classification: 1) points; 2) goal difference; 3) wins; 4) number of goals scored.

=== Third phase ===
Pos	Team	Pld	W	D	L	GF	GA	GD	Pts	Qualification or relegation
1	Flamengo	5	4	1	0	10	3	+7	9	Champions
2	Fluminense	5	3	2	0	8	1	+7	8	
3	Botafogo	5	2	1	2	6	7	−1	5	
4	Vasco da Gama	5	2	1	2	4	6	−2	5	
5	América	5	1	1	3	3	6	−3	3	
6	Bangu	5	0	0	5	2	10	−8	0	

Updated to match(es) played on May 31, 1970. Source: RSSSF.com
Rules for classification: 1) points; 2) goal difference; 3) wins; 4) number of goals scored.
