= 2026 CR Vasco da Gama season =

Vasco da Gama
2026 season
- Chairman: Pedrinho
- Manager: Fernando Diniz (until 22 February); Bruno Lazaroni (interim; 22 February – 3 March); Renato Gaúcho (3 March – 18 June); Bruno Lazaroni (interim; 19 June – 10 July); Pedro Emanuel (from 11 July)
- Stadium: São Januário
- Campeonato Brasileiro Série A: 10th
- Campeonato Carioca: Semi-finals
- Copa do Brasil: Semi-finals
- Copa Sudamericana: Semi-finals
- Top goalscorer: League: Thiago Mendes (6); All: Puma Rodríguez (10)
- Highest home attendance: 61,885 vs Boca Juniors (20 October 2026) (Note: This attendance took place at Maracanã. Vasco da Gama's highest attendance at São Januário, which has a 21,880 capacity, was 20,650 against Grêmio on 22 March 2026.)
- Lowest home attendance: 3,524 vs Barracas Central (27 May 2026)
| Home colours | Away colours | Third colours |
- All statistics correct as of 19 November 2026.

The 2026 season is the 129th season in the history of Club de Regatas Vasco da Gama. The club competed in the Campeonato Brasileiro Série A, the Campeonato Carioca, the Copa do Brasil, and the Copa Sudamericana.

== Summary ==
=== January ===
On 2 January 2026, almost two weeks after playing in the 2025 Copa do Brasil finals, Vasco da Gama began its preparation for the 2026 season with 24 of its players at the training center. On 5 January, Vasco da Gama renewed the loan of Carlos Cuesta until the end of the year. On 11 January, Vasco da Gama acquired the loan of Johan Rojas from Monterrey. Three days later, the club announced the signing of Alan Saldivia from Colo-Colo. On 15 January, Vasco da Gama debuted in the Campeonato Carioca with a 4–2 win against Maricá. On 17 January, the club reached an agreement with Cerro Porteño for the sale of Pablo Vegetti, the team's top scorer for three consecutive seasons. On 21 January, the club signed Marino Hinestroza from Atlético Nacional and Brenner from Udinese. On 24 January, Vasco da Gama completed a sale of Rayan to AFC Bournemouth for €28.5 million, plus bonuses of €6.5 million, making it the biggest sale in the club's history. On 29 January, Vasco da Gama debuted in the Campeonato Brasileiro Série A, losing away 2–1 against Mirassol.

=== February ===
On 4 February, Vasco and América-MG announced a pre-contract for the transfer of Paulinho, with the 21-year-old joining the club in June. On 7 February, Vasco da Gama secured the loan of Cuiabano from Nottingham Forest and the signing of Claudio Spinelli from Independiente del Valle. On 14 February, in the match against Volta Redonda for the quarterfinals of the Campeonato Carioca, captain Philippe Coutinho did not return from the locker room for the second half. On 20 February, Vasco da Gama announced the early termination of Philippe Coutinho's contract, after the player requested his departure from the club due to mental health issues. On 22 February, the club announced the dismissal of coach Fernando Diniz, after a 1–0 defeat against Fluminense in the first leg of the Campeonato Carioca semi-finals.

=== March ===
On 3 March, Vasco da Gama announced the signing of Renato Gaúcho as their new coach until December 2026. On 6 March, the club chose Johan Rojas to inherit the number 10 shirt following Philippe Coutinho's departure. In Renato's first match in charge, the team defeated the then league leaders Palmeiras 2–1, coming from behind. Renato chose Thiago Mendes to be the new team captain. Next, they drew 3–3 with Cruzeiro, beat Fluminense 3–2 with a goal in additional time and beat Grêmio 2–1.

=== April ===
On 7 April, Vasco da Gama made its debut in the Copa Sudamericana in a 0–0 away draw against Barracas Central. On that occasion, Renato Gaúcho chose not to travel for the game and fielded most of the team with reserve players and youth academy players. On 14 April, the club lost 2–1 to Audax Italiano at home. After the game, Renato mocked CONMEBOL, saying that "the club's priority is the [Campeonato] Brasileiro". On 23 April, CONMEBOL suspended Renato Gaúcho for the next three Copa Sudamericana matches due to his absence from the first game. On 21 April, Vasco da Gama debuted in the Copa do Brasil in the fifth round, winning 2–0 away against Paysandu, with two goals from Claudio Spinelli. On 30 April, the team won at home against Olimpia 3–0 and took the lead of their group in the Copa Sudamericana.

=== May ===
On 2 May, the team drew 2–2 with their rivals Flamengo, with both of Vasco's goals coming in the final minutes of the match. In the following days, they defeated Audax Italiano in the Copa Sudamericana and Athletico Paranaense in the league, and drew with Paysandu in the second leg of the Copa do Brasil fifth round, securing qualification. On 20 May, Vasco fielded a reserve squad for an away match against Olimpia in the Copa Sudamericana group stage, losing 3–1; this outraged a large portion of the fanbase, as the team should have fielded its key players—a win would have guaranteed the top spot in the group and direct advancement to the round of 16. Although the team beat Barracas Central 3–0 in the next match, Olimpia's victory over Audax Italiano meant Vasco finished second in the group and had to play in the knockout playoff round. Vasco went on to lose their final three league matches before the break for the FIFA World Cup, keeping them in the relegation zone throughout that period.

=== June ===
On 18 June, Renato Gaúcho was dismissed from his position due to the players' dissatisfaction with some of the coach's statements. On 23 June, the Rio de Janeiro courts removed chairman Pedrinho from the management of the SAF, granting a request by 777 Partners. This hindered the club from hiring a new coach.

=== July ===
On 10 July, the courts suspended the judicial intervention and returned the management of the SAF to Pedrinho. In the same day, Vasco announced Pedro Emanuel as the new head coach. On 11 July, Vasco announced Paulinho as a new signing. The team returned from the break with a 1–0 away loss to EC Vitória. The team returned from the break with a 1–0 away loss to Vitória. They faced Independiente Medellín in the Copa Sudamericana knockout play-offs, drawing 2–2 away and then winning 1–0 at home.

=== August ===
Subsequently, they eliminated their rival Fluminense in the round of 16 of the Copa do Brasil, with a 0–0 draw at home and a 3–1 win away, both matches at the Maracanã. In the league, Vasco drew 0–0 with Bahia and lost 0–3 to Santos and 1–4 to Palmeiras, keeping the team in the relegation zone. On the other hand, they eliminated Olimpia in the round of 16 of the Copa Sudamericana with a 4–1 away victory in the second leg; and eliminated EC Vitória in the quarterfinals of the Copa do Brasil by winning the two legs. On 29 August, they defeated Cruzeiro 3–1 at home in the league.

== Competitions ==
=== Overall record ===
| Competition | First match | Last match | Starting round | Final position | Record | | | | | | | |
| Competition | First match | Last match | Starting round | Final position | Pld | W | D | L | GF | GA | GD | Win % |
|---|---|---|---|---|---|---|---|---|---|---|---|---|
| Campeonato Carioca | 15 January 2026 | 1 March 2026 | Group stage | Semi-finals | 9 | 3 | 4 | 2 | 11 | 6 | +5 | 33.33 |
| Campeonato Brasileiro Série A | 26 February 2026 | 2 December 2026 | Matchday 1 | TBD | 35 | 13 | 8 | 14 | 47 | 51 | −4 | 37.14 |
| Copa do Brasil | 21 April 2026 | 8 November 2026 | Fifth round | Semi-finals | 8 | 5 | 2 | 1 | 12 | 5 | +7 | 62.50 |
| Copa Sudamericana | 7 April 2026 | 20 October 2026 | Group stage | Semi-finals | 14 | 7 | 4 | 3 | 22 | 12 | +10 | 50.00 |
| Total | | | | | 66 | 28 | 18 | 20 | 92 | 74 | +18 | 42.42 |

Last updated: 19 November 2026
Source: Competitions

=== Campeonato Carioca ===
Group stage

| Pos | Team | Pld | W | D | L | GF | GA | GD | Pts | Qualification or relegation |
|---|---|---|---|---|---|---|---|---|---|---|
| 1 | Fluminense | 6 | 5 | 0 | 1 | 9 | 5 | +4 | 15 | Qualified for the Quarter-final |
| 2 | Vasco da Gama | 6 | 3 | 2 | 1 | 9 | 3 | +6 | 11 | Qualified for the Quarter-final |
| 3 | Volta Redonda | 6 | 3 | 2 | 1 | 9 | 5 | +4 | 11 | Qualified for the Quarter-final |
| 4 | Bangu | 6 | 3 | 1 | 2 | 7 | 7 | 0 | 10 | Qualified for the Quarter-final |
| 5 | Portuguesa | 6 | 2 | 1 | 3 | 6 | 7 | −1 | 7 | Relegation stage |
| 6 | Sampaio Corrêa | 6 | 2 | 1 | 3 | 7 | 14 | −7 | 7 | Relegation stage |

Source: FERJ

| 15 January 2026 1 | Vasco da Gama | 4–2 | Maricá | Rio de Janeiro |
| 21:30 UTC−3 | Rayan 7' 50'; Philippe Coutinho 25'; Carlos Cuesta 55' | Report | Alex 41'; Marcelo 61' | Stadium: São Januário; Attendance: 12,011; Referee: Bruno Mota Correia |

| 18 January 2026 2 | Vasco da Gama | 0–0 | Nova Iguaçu | Rio de Janeiro |
| 18:00 UTC−3 | | Report | | Stadium: São Januário; Attendance: 14,747; Referee: Luiz Claudio Regazone |

| 21 January 2026 3 | Flamengo | 1–0 | Vasco da Gama | Rio de Janeiro |
| 21:30 UTC−3 | Jorge Carrascal 69' | Report | Cauan Barros (red card) 51' | Stadium: Maracanã; Attendance: 47,595; Referee: Bruno Arleu de Araújo |

| 25 January 2026 4 | Boavista | 0–3 | Vasco da Gama | Rio de Janeiro |
| 20:30 UTC−3 | | Report | Puma Rodríguez 45+3' 65'; Andrés Gómez 69' | Stadium: São Januário; Attendance: 3,356; Referee: Pierry Dias dos Santos |

| 2 February 2026 5 | Madureira | 0–0 | Vasco da Gama | Rio de Janeiro |
| 20:00 UTC−3 | | Report | | Stadium: Conselheiro Galvão; Attendance: 7,909; Referee: Lucas Coelho Santos |

| 8 February 2026 6 | Vasco da Gama | 2–0 | Botafogo | Rio de Janeiro |
| 18:00 UTC−3 | Brenner 49'; Philippe Coutinho 63' | Report | Marquinhos (red card) 44'; Allan (red card) 64' | Stadium: São Januário; Attendance: 15,049; Referee: Yuri Elino Ferreira da Cruz |

Quarter-final

| 14 February 2026 | Vasco da Gama | 1–1 (5–3 p) | Volta Redonda | Rio de Janeiro |
| 21:30 UTC−3 | Claudio Spinelli 67' | Report | Ygor Catatau 28' | Stadium: São Januário; Attendance: 8,512; Referee: Jodis Nascimento de Souza |
| | Penalties |
| | Johan Rojas (penalty scored); Tchê Tchê (penalty scored); Claudio Spinelli (penalty scored); David (penalty scored); Puma Rodríguez (penalty scored) | | Marquinhos (penalty missed); Lucas Adell (penalty scored); Wagninho (penalty scored); Rafael Castro (penalty scored) |

Semifinals

| 22 February 2026 First leg | Vasco da Gama | 0–1 | Fluminense | Rio de Janeiro |
| 18:00 UTC−3 | | Report | Kevin Serna 31' | Stadium: São Januário; Attendance: 10,244; Referee: Jodis Nascimento de Souza |

| 1 March 2026 Second leg | Fluminense | 1–1 | Vasco da Gama | Rio de Janeiro |
| 18:00 UTC−3 | PH Ganso 89' | Report | Robert Renan 35' | Stadium: Maracanã; Attendance: 35,125; Referee: Wagner do Nascimento Magalhães |

=== Campeonato Brasileiro Série A ===
League table

| Pos | Team | Pld | W | D | L | GF | GA | GD | Pts | Qualification or relegation |
|---|---|---|---|---|---|---|---|---|---|---|
| 8 | Santos | 35 | 13 | 11 | 11 | 51 | 49 | +2 | 50 | Qualification for Copa Sudamericana group stage |
| 9 | Red Bull Bragantino | 35 | 13 | 8 | 14 | 45 | 41 | +4 | 47 | Qualification for Copa Sudamericana group stage |
| 10 | Vasco da Gama | 35 | 13 | 8 | 14 | 47 | 51 | −4 | 47 | Qualification for Copa Sudamericana group stage |
| 11 | São Paulo | 35 | 12 | 8 | 15 | 39 | 40 | −1 | 44 | Qualification for Copa Sudamericana group stage |
| 12 | Botafogo | 35 | 11 | 9 | 15 | 46 | 57 | −11 | 42 | Qualification for Copa Sudamericana group stage |

Updated to match(es) played on 19 November 2026. Source: CBF
Rules for classification: 1) points; 2) wins; 3) goal difference; 4) goals scored; 5) head-to-head results (only between two teams); 6) fewest red cards; 7) fewest yellow cards; 8) drawing of lots.

Results by round

| Round | 1 | 2 | 3 | 4 | 5 | 6 | 7 | 8 | 9 | 10 | 11 | 12 | 13 | 14 | 15 | 16 | 17 | 18 | 19 | 20 | 21 | 22 | 23 | 24 | 25 | 26 | 27 | 28 | 29 | 30 | 31 | 32 | 33 | 34 | 35 | 36 |
|---|---|---|---|---|---|---|---|---|---|---|---|---|---|---|---|---|---|---|---|---|---|---|---|---|---|---|---|---|---|---|---|---|---|---|---|---|
| Ground | A | H | H | A | H | A | H | H | A | H | A | H | A | A | H | A | H | H | A | H | A | A | H | A | H | A | A | H | A | H | A | H | H | A | H | A |
| Result | L | D | L | L | W | D | W | W | D | L | D | W | L | D | W | L | L | L | L | D | W | D | L | L | W | L | W | W | W | D | L | W | L | W | W | |
| Position | 12 | 14 | 17 | 20 | 17 | 15 | 10 | 9 | 8 | 12 | 13 | 10 | 10 | 13 | 8 | 12 | 16 | 17 | 17 | 17 | 15 | 16 | 16 | 16 | 16 | 16 | 15 | 13 | 11 | 12 | 13 | 11 | 12 | 11 | 10 | |
| Points | 0 | 1 | 1 | 1 | 4 | 5 | 8 | 11 | 12 | 12 | 13 | 16 | 16 | 17 | 20 | 20 | 20 | 20 | 20 | 21 | 24 | 25 | 25 | 25 | 28 | 28 | 31 | 34 | 37 | 38 | 38 | 41 | 41 | 44 | 47 | |

Updated to match(es) played on 19 November 2026. Source:
A = Away; H = Home; W = Win; D = Draw; L = Loss

Matches

| 29 January 2026 1 | Mirassol | 2–1 | Vasco da Gama | Mirassol |
| 20:00 UTC−3 | Carlos Cuesta 32' (o.g.); Eduardo 54' | Report | Philippe Coutinho 21' | Stadium: José Maria de Campos Maia; Attendance: 5,883; Referee: Rodrigo José Pereira de Lima |

| 5 February 2026 2 | Vasco da Gama | 1–1 | Chapecoense | Rio de Janeiro |
| 20:00 UTC−3 | Puma Rodríguez 55' | Report | Jean Carlos 90+1' | Stadium: São Januário; Attendance: 15,702; Referee: Wilton Sampaio |

| 11 February 2026 3 | Vasco da Gama | 0–1 | Bahia | Rio de Janeiro |
| 20:00 UTC−3 | | Report | Luciano Juba 22' | Stadium: São Januário; Attendance: 11,477; Referee: Paulo César Zanovelli da Silva |

| 26 February 2026 4 | Santos | 2–1 | Vasco da Gama | Santos |
| 19:00 UTC−3 | Neymar 25' 61' | Report | Cauan Barros 43' | Stadium: Vila Belmiro; Attendance: 8,808; Referee: Rafael Rodrigo Klein |

| 12 March 2026 5 | Vasco da Gama | 2–1 | Palmeiras | Rio de Janeiro |
| 19:30 UTC−3 | Thiago Mendes 63'; Cuiabano 74' | Report | Flaco López 40' | Stadium: São Januário; Attendance: 17,291; Referee: Sávio Pereira Sampaio |

| 15 March 2026 6 | Cruzeiro | 3–3 | Vasco da Gama | Belo Horizonte |
| 20:30 UTC−3 | Christian 8'; Néiser Villarreal 70'; Japa 90+4' | Report | Cauan Barros 52' 54' (red card) 59'; Brenner 86' | Stadium: Mineirão; Attendance: 22,352; Referee: Lucas Paulo Torezin |

| 18 March 2026 7 | Vasco da Gama | 3–2 | Fluminense | Rio de Janeiro |
| 21:30 UTC−3 | Nuno Moreira 59'; Claudio Spinelli 88'; Thiago Mendes 90+5' | Report | Agustín Canobbio 1'; Hércules 54' | Stadium: Maracanã; Attendance: 38,449; Referee: Raphael Claus |

| 22 March 2026 8 | Vasco da Gama | 2–1 | Grêmio | Rio de Janeiro |
| 16:00 UTC−3 | Thiago Mendes 7'; David 34' | Report | Carlos Vinícius 38' | Stadium: São Januário; Attendance: 20,650; Referee: Davi de Oliveira Lacerda |

| 1 April 2026 9 | Coritiba | 1–1 | Vasco da Gama | Curitiba |
| 20:30 UTC−3 | Alan Saldivia 90' (o.g.) | Report | Tchê Tchê 24' | Stadium: Couto Pereira; Attendance: 27,224; Referee: Ramon Abatti |

| 4 April 2026 10 | Vasco da Gama | 1–2 | Botafogo | Rio de Janeiro |
| 21:00 UTC−3 | David 61' | Report | Lucas Villalba 66'; Matheus Martins 79' | Stadium: São Januário; Attendance: 20,072; Referee: Wagner do Nascimento Magalhães |

| 11 April 2026 11 | Remo | 1–1 | Vasco da Gama | Belém |
| 16:30 UTC−3 | Marllon 84' | Report | Andrés Gómez 54' | Stadium: Baenão; Attendance: 35,305; Referee: Rodrigo José Pereira de Lima |

| 18 April 2026 12 | Vasco da Gama | 2–1 | São Paulo | Rio de Janeiro |
| 18:30 UTC−3 | Puma Rodríguez 72'; Andrés Gómez 88' | Report | Luciano 10' | Stadium: São Januário; Attendance: 20,067; Referee: Sávio Pereira Sampaio |

| 26 April 2026 13 | Corinthians | 1–0 | Vasco da Gama | São Paulo |
| 16:00 UTC−3 | Matheus Bidu 38'; André (red card) 45' | Report | | Stadium: Neo Química Arena; Attendance: 42,352; Referee: Davi de Oliveira Lacerda |

| 3 May 2026 14 | Flamengo | 2–2 | Vasco da Gama | Rio de Janeiro |
| 16:00 UTC−3 | Pedro 8'; Jorginho 68' (pen.) | Report | Robert Renan 84'; Hugo Moura 90+2' | Stadium: Maracanã; Attendance: 61,872; Referee: Wilton Sampaio |

| 10 May 2026 15 | Vasco da Gama | 1–0 | Athletico Paranaense | Rio de Janeiro |
| 20:30 UTC−3 | Thiago Mendes 37' | Report | | Stadium: São Januário; Attendance: 13,917; Referee: Raphael Claus |

| 16 May 2026 16 | Internacional | 4–1 | Vasco da Gama | Porto Alegre |
| 18:30 UTC−3 | Johan Carbonero 21' 71'; Alerrandro 24'; Alexandro Bernabei 62' | Report | Andrés Gómez 85'; Carlos Cuesta (red card) 90+2' | Stadium: Beira-Rio; Attendance: 21,411; Referee: Ramon Abatti |

| 24 May 2026 17 | Vasco da Gama | 0–3 | Red Bull Bragantino | Rio de Janeiro |
| 20:30 UTC−3 | | Report | Rodriguinho 45+1'; Isidro Pitta 60'; Fernando 77' | Stadium: São Januário; Attendance: 13,805; Referee: Fernando Antônio Mendes |

| 31 May 2026 18 | Vasco da Gama | 0–1 | Atlético Mineiro | Rio de Janeiro |
| 16:00 UTC−3 | | Report | Victor Huge 32' | Stadium: São Januário; Attendance: 20,133; Referee: Anderson Daronco |

| 16 July 2026 19 | Vitória | 1–0 | Vasco da Gama | Salvador |
| 19:30 UTC−3 | Renato Kayzer 69' | Report | | Stadium: Barradão; Attendance: 20,112; Referee: Matheus Delgado Candançan |

| 25 July 2026 20 | Vasco da Gama | 1–1 | Mirassol | Rio de Janeiro |
| 20:30 UTC−3 | Andrés Gómez 80' | Report | Igor Formiga 30' | Stadium: São Januário; Attendance: 10,649; Referee: Rafael Rodrigo Klein |

| 9 August 2026 22 | Bahia | 0–0 | Vasco da Gama | Salvador |
| 16:00 UTC−3 | | Report | | Stadium: Casa de Apostas Arena Fonte Nova; Attendance: 40,175; Referee: Rodrigo José Pereira de Lima |

| 16 August 2026 23 | Vasco da Gama | 0–3 | Santos | Rio de Janeiro |
| 16:00 UTC−3 | | Report | Gabriel Barbosa 68'; Willian Arão 77'; Luan Peres 81' | Stadium: São Januário; Attendance: 20,430; Referee: Lucas Casagrande |

| 23 August 2026 24 | Palmeiras | 4–1 | Vasco da Gama | São Paulo |
| 16:00 UTC−3 | José Manuel López 47' 89'; Vitor Roque 51'; Maurício 56' | Report | Facundo Colidio 90+4' | Stadium: Nubank Parque; Attendance: 36,382; Referee: Bráulio da Silva Machado |

| 29 August 2026 25 | Vasco da Gama | 3–1 | Cruzeiro | Rio de Janeiro |
| 21:20 UTC−3 | Tchê Tchê 33'; Lucas Freitas 55'; David 90+2' | Report | Felipe Morais 90+5' | Stadium: São Januário; Attendance: 19,021; Referee: Fernando Antônio Mendes |

| 5 September 2026 26 | Fluminense | 1–0 | Vasco da Gama | Rio de Janeiro |
| 21:00 UTC−3 | Luciano Acosta 61' | Report | | Stadium: Maracanã; Attendance: 38,750; Referee: Davi de Oliveira Lacerda |

| 12 September 2026 27 | Grêmio | 1–2 | Vasco da Gama | Porto Alegre |
| 16:00 UTC−3 | Mathías Villasanti 39' | Report | Thiago Mendes 76'; Facundo Colidio 80' | Stadium: Arena do Grêmio; Attendance: 34,297; Referee: Raphael Claus |

| 20 September 2026 28 | Vasco da Gama | 5–0 | Coritiba | Rio de Janeiro |
| 20:30 UTC−3 | Facundo Colidio 24'; Bruno Duarte 44'; Alan Lescano 56' (pen.); Andrés Gómez 63'; Ramon Rique 74' | Report | | Stadium: São Januário; Attendance: 19,943; Referee: Bráulio da Silva Machado |

| 7 October 2026 29 | Botafogo | 1–2 | Vasco da Gama | Rio de Janeiro |
| 20:30 UTC−3 | Alex Telles 60' | Report | Alan Lescano 28'; David 51' | Stadium: Olímpico Nilton Santos; Attendance: 23,596; Referee: Bruno Arleu de Araújo |

| 10 October 2026 30 | Vasco da Gama | 0–0 | Remo | Rio de Janeiro |
| 18:00 UTC−3 | | Report | | Stadium: São Januário; Referee: Paulo Cesar Zanovelli |

| 17 October 2026 31 | São Paulo | 1–0 | Vasco da Gama | São Paulo |
| 21:00 UTC−3 | Artur 68' | Report | | Stadium: MorumBIS; Attendance: 31,479; Referee: Fernando Antônio Mendes |

| 24 October 2026 32 | Vasco da Gama | 3–2 | Corinthians | Rio de Janeiro |
| 18:30 UTC−3 | Puma Rodríguez 35'; Marino Hinestroza 88' 90' | Report | Gustavo Henrique 50'; Matheus Bidu 57' | Stadium: São Januário; Attendance: 19,048; Referee: William Sampaio |

| 29 October 2026 33 | Vasco da Gama | 1–4 | Flamengo | Rio de Janeiro |
| 20:00 UTC−3 | Alan Lescano 15' | Report | Pedro 10' 41'; Samuel Lino 53' 85' | Stadium: Olímpico Nilton Santos; Attendance: 28,041; Referee: Bruno Arleu de Araújo |

| 4 November 2026 34 | Athletico Paranaense | 1–3 | Vasco da Gama | Curitiba |
| 19:30 UTC−3 | Stiven Mendoza 22'; Kevin Viveros (red card) 77' | Report | Juan Felipe Aguirre 61' (o.g.); Bruno Duarte 63'; Gabriel Pereira 67' | Stadium: Arena da Baixada; Attendance: 20,872; Referee: Ramon Abatti |

| 14 November 2026 21 | Chapecoense | 0–2 | Vasco da Gama | Chapecó |
| 20:30 UTC−3 | | Report | Bruno Duarte 36' 81' | Stadium: Arena Condá; Attendance: 7,698; Referee: Rodrigo José Pereira de Lima |

| 19 November 2026 35 | Vasco da Gama | 2–1 | Internacional | Rio de Janeiro |
| 19:30 UTC−3 | Thiago Mendes 26'; Facundo Colidio 63' | Report | Juninho 51' | Stadium: São Januário; Referee: Paulo Cesar Zanovelli |

| 22 November 2026 36 | Red Bull Bragantino | v | Vasco da Gama | Bragança Paulista |
| 19:30 UTC−3 | | Report | | Stadium: Cícero de Souza Marques |

| 29 November 2026 37 | Atlético Mineiro | v | Vasco da Gama | Belo Horizonte |
| --:-- UTC−3 | | Report | | Stadium: Arena MRV |

| 2 December 2026 38 | Vasco da Gama | v | Vitória | Rio de Janeiro |
| --:-- UTC−3 | | Report | | Stadium: São Januário |

=== Copa do Brasil ===
Fifth round

| 21 April 2026 First leg | Paysandu | 0–2 | Vasco da Gama | Belém |
| 21:30 UTC−3 | | Report | Claudio Spinelli 57' 62' | Stadium: Mangueirão; Attendance: 25,933; Referee: Renan Abatti |

| 13 May 2026 Second leg | Vasco da Gama | 2–2 | Paysandu | Rio de Janeiro |
| 19:00 UTC−3 | Johan Rojas 36' (pen.); Thiago Mendes 42' (red card) 90' | Report | Thayllon 45+3'; Alan Saldivia 46' (o.g.) | Stadium: São Januário; Attendance: 16,653; Referee: Bráulio da Silva Machado |

Round of 16

| 1 August 2026 First leg | Vasco da Gama | 0–0 | Fluminense | Rio de Janeiro |
| 17:30 UTC−3 | | Report | | Stadium: Maracanã; Attendance: 38,608; Referee: Ramon Abatti |

| 5 August 2026 Second leg | Fluminense | 1–3 | Vasco da Gama | Rio de Janeiro |
| 21:30 UTC−3 | Matheus Martinelli 77' | Report | Brenner 34' 52'; Puma Rodríguez 90+10' | Stadium: Maracanã; Attendance: 48,794; Referee: Wilton Sampaio |

Quarter-finals

| 26 August 2026 First leg | Vasco da Gama | 1–0 | Vitória | Rio de Janeiro |
| 21:30 UTC−3 | Cauan Barros (red card) 18'; Andrés Gómez 59' | Report | | Stadium: São Januário; Attendance: 19,194; Referee: Matheus Delgado Candançan |

| 2 September 2026 Second leg | Vitória | 0–2 | Vasco da Gama | Salvador |
| 21:30 UTC−3 | | Report | Andrés Gómez 81'; Puma Rodríguez 90+6' | Stadium: Barradão; Attendance: 28,499; Referee: Rafael Rodrigo Klein |

Semi-finals

| 1 November 2026 First leg | Palmeiras | 1–0 | Vasco da Gama | São Paulo |
| 16:00 UTC−3 | Maurício 24' | Report | Alan Saldivia (red card) 77' | Stadium: Nubank Parque; Attendance: 40,570; Referee: Anderson Daronco |

| 8 November 2026 Second leg | Vasco da Gama | 2–1 (4–5 p) | Palmeiras | Rio de Janeiro |
| 17:00 UTC−3 | Facundo Colidio 16'; Puma Rodríguez 76' | Report | Joaquín Piquerez 55' | Stadium: São Januário; Attendance: 20,418; Referee: Bráulio da Silva Machado |
| | Penalties |
| | Alan Lescano (penalty missed); Thiago Mendes (penalty scored); Santiago Sosa (penalty scored); Facundo Colidio (penalty scored); Puma Rodríguez (penalty scored); Andrés Gómez (penalty missed) | | (penalty scored) Vitor Roque; (penalty scored) Gustavo Gómez; (penalty scored) Ramón Sosa; (penalty scored) Andreas Pereira; (penalty missed) Agustín Giay; (penalty scored) Marlon Freitas |

=== Copa Sudamericana ===
Group stage

| Pos | Team | Pld | W | D | L | GF | GA | GD | Pts | Qualification |
|---|---|---|---|---|---|---|---|---|---|---|
| 1 | (Paraguay) Olimpia | 6 | 4 | 1 | 1 | 10 | 6 | +4 | 13 | Advance to round of 16 |
| 2 | (Brazil) Vasco da Gama | 6 | 3 | 1 | 2 | 10 | 6 | +4 | 10 | Advance to knockout round play-offs |
| 3 | (Chile) Audax Italiano | 6 | 2 | 1 | 3 | 7 | 9 | −2 | 7 | |
| 4 | (Argentina) Barracas Central | 6 | 0 | 3 | 3 | 2 | 8 | −6 | 3 | |

Source: CONMEBOL

| 7 April 2026 1 | Barracas Central (Argentina) | 0–0 | (Brazil) Vasco da Gama | Buenos Aires, Argentina |
| 19:00 UTC−3 | Maximiliano Puig (red card) 78' | Report | | Stadium: Florencio Sola; Referee: Carlos Betancur (Colombia) |

| 14 April 2026 2 | Vasco da Gama (Brazil) | 1–2 | (Chile) Audax Italiano | Rio de Janeiro, Brazil |
| 21:00 UTC−3 | JP (red card) 35'; Brenner 45+3'; Carlos Cuesta (red card) 83' | Report | Michael Vadulli 62'; Franco Troyansky 86' | Stadium: São Januário; Attendance: 13,084; Referee: Henán Heras (Uruguay) |

| 30 April 2026 3 | Vasco da Gama (Brazil) | 3–0 | (Paraguay) Olimpia | Rio de Janeiro, Brazil |
| 19:00 UTC−3 | Puma Rodríguez 39'; Nuno Moreira 51'; Adson 55' | Report | | Stadium: São Januário; Attendance: 12,543; Referee: Jesús Valenzuela (Venezuela) |

| 6 May 2026 4 | Audax Italiano (Chile) | 1–2 | (Brazil) Vasco da Gama | Santiago, Chile |
| 18:00 UTC−4 | Alan Saldivia 5' (o.g.); Marcelo Ortiz (red card) 62' | Report | Claudio Spinelli 64'; Matheus França 71' | Stadium: Bicentenario de La Florida; Referee: Jhon Ospina (Colombia) |

| 20 May 2026 5 | Olimpia (Paraguay) | 3–1 | (Brazil) Vasco da Gama | Asunción, Uruguay |
| 19:00 UTC−3 | Mateo Gamarra 67'; Hugo Sandoval 85'; Sebastián Ferreira 90+4' | Report | Carlos Cuesta 45+4'; João Vitor (red card) 72' | Stadium: Defensores del Chaco; Referee: Wílmar Roldán (Colombia) |

| 27 May 2026 6 | Vasco da Gama (Brazil) | 3–0 | (Argentina) Barracas Central | Rio de Janeiro, Brazil |
| 19:00 UTC−3 | Adson 32' 45+2'; Johan Rojas 55' | Report | Rodrigo Insúa (red card) 39' | Stadium: São Januário; Attendance: 3,524; Referee: Esteban Ostojich (Uruguay) |

Knockout round play-offs

| 22 July 2026 First leg | Independiente Medellín (Colombia) | 2–2 | (Brazil) Vasco da Gama | Medellín, Colombia |
| 19:00 UTC−5 | John Montaño 45+4' 72' | Report | Joaquín Varela 46' (o.g.); Claudio Spinelli 86' | Stadium: Atanasio Girardot; Attendance: 0 Referee: Piero Maza (Chile) |

| 29 July 2026 Second leg | Vasco da Gama (Brazil) | 1–0 | (Colombia) Independiente Medellín | Rio de Janeiro, Brazil |
| 19:00 UTC−3 | Thiago Mendes 85' | Report | | Stadium: São Januário; Attendance: 15,835; Referee: Maximiliano Ramírez (Argentina) |

Round of 16

| 13 August 2026 First leg | Vasco da Gama (Brazil) | 0–0 | (Paraguay) Olimpia | Rio de Janeiro, Brazil |
| 19:00 UTC−3 | | Report | | Stadium: São Januário; Attendance: 18,985; Referee: Darío Herrera (Argentina) |

| 20 August 2026 Second leg | Olimpia (Paraguay) | 1–4 | (Brazil) Vasco da Gama | Asunción, Paraguay |
| 19:00 UTC−3 | Esteban Matus 15' | Report | Thiago Mendes 29'; David 36'; Adson 70'; Claudio Spinelli 84' | Stadium: Defensores del Chaco; Referee: Esteban Ostojich (Uruguay) |

Quarter-finals

| 8 September 2026 First leg | Santa Fe (Colombia) | 0–0 | (Brazil) Vasco da Gama | Bogotá, Colombia |
| 19:00 UTC−5 | | Report | | Stadium: El Campín; Referee: Dario Herrera (Argentina) |

| 15 September 2026 Second leg | Vasco da Gama (Brazil) | 2–0 | (Colombia) Santa Fe | Rio de Janeiro, Brazil |
| 19:00 UTC−3 | Bruno Duarte 37'; David 65' | Report | | Stadium: São Januário; Attendance: 19,337; Referee: Alexis Herrera (Venezuela) |

Semi-finals

| 13 October 2026 First leg | Boca Juniors (Argentina) | 0–1 | (Brazil) Vasco da Gama | Buenos Aires, Argentina |
| 21:30 UTC−3 | | Report | Adson 25'; Andrés Gómez (red card) 64' | Stadium: La Bombonera; Attendance: 54,000; Referee: Piero Maza (Chile) |

| 20 October 2026 Second leg | Vasco da Gama (Brazil) | 1–3 | (Argentina) Boca Juniors | Rio de Janeiro, Brazil |
| 21:30 UTC−3 | Puma Rodríguez 66' | Report | Lautaro Di Lollo 4'; Miguel Merentiel 34'; Leandro Paredes 88' | Stadium: Maracanã; Attendance: 61,885; Referee: Jesús Valenzuela (Venezuela) |

== Squad statistics ==
As of 19 November 2026

| No. | Pos. | Name | Campeonato Carioca | | Campeonato Brasileiro Série A | | Copa do Brasil | | Copa Sudamericana | | Total | | Discipline | |
| No. | Pos. | Name | Apps | Goals | Apps | Goals | Apps | Goals | Apps | Goals | Apps | Goals | Yellow card | Red card |
Goalkeepers
| 1 | GK | (Brazil) Léo Jardim | 8 | 0 | 35 | 0 | 8 | 0 | 12 | 0 | 63 | 0 | 3 | 0 |
| 13 | GK | (Brazil) Daniel Fuzato | 1 | 0 | 0 | 0 | 0 | 0 | 2 | 0 | 3 | 0 | 2 | 0 |
| 37 | GK | (Brazil) Pablo | 0 | 0 | 0 | 0 | 0 | 0 | 0 | 0 | 0 | 0 | 0 | 0 |
Defenders
| 2 | RB / LB | (Uruguay) Puma Rodríguez | 7+1 | 2 | 16+10 | 3 | 3+3 | 3 | 8+2 | 2 | 34+16 | 10 | 2 | 0 |
| 96 | RB | (Brazil) Paulo Henrique | 3+2 | 0 | 19+4 | 0 | 5+1 | 0 | 4+5 | 0 | 31+12 | 0 | 4 | 0 |
| 4 | CB | (Uruguay) Alan Saldivia | 5+1 | 0 | 17+1 | 0 | 3 | 0 | 7+1 | 0 | 32+3 | 0 | 6 | 1 |
| 30 | CB | (Brazil) Robert Renan | 8 | 1 | 33 | 1 | 7 | 0 | 8 | 0 | 56 | 2 | 7 | 0 |
| 43 | CB | (Brazil) Lucas Freitas | 1 | 0 | 2+3 | 1 | 1+1 | 0 | 3+2 | 0 | 7+6 | 1 | 4 | 0 |
| 46 | CB | (Colombia) Carlos Cuesta | 3+1 | 1 | 16 | 0 | 4 | 0 | 7 | 1 | 30+1 | 2 | 3 | 2 |
| 55 | CB | (Brazil) Gabriel Pereira | 0 | 0 | 3 | 1 | 1+1 | 0 | 0+1 | 0 | 4+2 | 1 | 2 | 0 |
| 6 | LB | (Brazil) Lucas Piton | 7+1 | 0 | 15+7 | 0 | 4+1 | 0 | 6+1 | 0 | 32+10 | 0 | 3 | 1 |
| 29 | LB | (Brazil) Paulinho | 0 | 0 | 0 | 0 | 0 | 0 | 0 | 0 | 0 | 0 | 0 | 0 |
| 66 | LB | (Brazil) Cuiabano | 0+1 | 0 | 21+4 | 1 | 4+1 | 0 | 6+1 | 0 | 31+7 | 1 | 6 | 0 |
Midfielders
| 5 | DM / CB | (Argentina) Santiago Sosa | 0 | 0 | 10+2 | 0 | 3+1 | 0 | 3+1 | 0 | 16+4 | 0 | 1 | 0 |
| 85 | DM | (Brazil) Matheus Carvalho | 0 | 0 | 0 | 0 | 0 | 0 | 0 | 0 | 0 | 0 | 0 | 0 |
| 88 | DM | (Brazil) Cauan Barros | 7 | 0 | 15+4 | 3 | 3+2 | 0 | 7+1 | 0 | 31+7 | 3 | 8 | 3 |
| 3 | CM / AM | (Brazil) Tchê Tchê | 4+4 | 0 | 18+5 | 2 | 2+3 | 0 | 5+3 | 0 | 30+14 | 2 | 6 | 0 |
| 8 | CM | (Brazil) Jair | 0 | 0 | 5+6 | 0 | 2 | 0 | 0+1 | 0 | 8+7 | 0 | 2 | 0 |
| 23 | CM / AM | (Brazil) Thiago Mendes | 5+1 | 0 | 30+1 | 6 | 7 | 1 | 7+2 | 2 | 49+4 | 9 | 14 | 1 |
| 83 | CM / AM | (Brazil) Ramon Rique | 0 | 0 | 1+11 | 1 | 3+2 | 0 | 8+4 | 0 | 10+17 | 1 | 2 | 0 |
| 10 | AM | (Colombia) Johan Rojas | 4+3 | 0 | 10+8 | 0 | 2+1 | 1 | 4+1 | 1 | 20+12 | 2 | 5 | 0 |
| 22 | AM | (Argentina) Alan Lescano | 0 | 0 | 9+1 | 3 | 2 | 0 | 2 | 0 | 13+1 | 3 | 2 | 0 |
Forwards
| 18 | RW / LW | (Colombia) Marino Hinestroza | 0+4 | 0 | 4+16 | 2 | 1+2 | 0 | 5+5 | 0 | 10+27 | 2 | 3 | 0 |
| 28 | RW | (Brazil) Adson | 0+4 | 0 | 9+8 | 0 | 3+4 | 0 | 8+3 | 5 | 20+19 | 5 | 3 | 0 |
| 19 | CF | (Brazil) Bruno Duarte | 0 | 0 | 7+3 | 4 | 2 | 0 | 3+1 | 1 | 12+4 | 5 | 1 | 0 |
| 20 | CF | (Brazil) Brenner | 4+1 | 1 | 8+13 | 1 | 2+3 | 2 | 2+6 | 1 | 14+23 | 5 | 2 | 0 |
| 77 | CF | (Argentina) Claudio Spinelli | 1+2 | 1 | 7+11 | 1 | 3+2 | 2 | 7+4 | 3 | 17+18 | 7 | 3 | 0 |
| 9 | SS / RW / CF / LW | (Argentina) Facundo Colidio | 0 | 0 | 12+2 | 4 | 3+1 | 1 | 0 | 0 | 15+3 | 5 | 2 | 0 |
| 7 | LW / CF | (Brazil) David | 2+5 | 0 | 13+12 | 4 | 2+4 | 0 | 4+3 | 2 | 21+24 | 6 | 1 | 0 |
| 11 | LW / RW | (Colombia) Andrés Gómez | 8+1 | 1 | 29+2 | 5 | 6+1 | 2 | 5+2 | 0 | 47+6 | 8 | 17 | 1 |
| 17 | LW / RW | (Portugal) Nuno Moreira | 6+1 | 0 | 12+11 | 1 | 1+3 | 0 | 9+3 | 1 | 29+18 | 2 | 5 | 0 |
| 45 | LW | (Angola) Loide Augusto | 0 | 0 | 0+1 | 0 | 0 | 0 | 0 | 0 | 0+1 | 0 | 0 | 0 |
Academy players (with fewer than 10 first-team appearances)
| 60 | LB / RB | (Brazil) João Vitor | 0+2 | 0 | 1+3 | 0 | 0 | 0 | 1 | 0 | 2+5 | 0 | 0 | 1 |
| 82 | LB | (Brazil) Riquelme Avellar | 0 | 0 | 0+2 | 0 | 0 | 0 | 2+3 | 0 | 2+5 | 0 | 0 | 0 |
| 67 | DM | (Brazil) Samuel Jesus | 0 | 0 | 0 | 0 | 0 | 0 | 0+1 | 0 | 0+1 | 0 | 0 | 0 |
| 74 | AM | (Brazil) Andrey Fernandes | 0 | 0 | 0+1 | 0 | 0 | 0 | 0 | 0 | 0+1 | 0 | 0 | 0 |
| 86 | AM | (Brazil) Lukas Zuccarello | 0 | 0 | 0+1 | 0 | 0 | 0 | 0+4 | 0 | 0+5 | 0 | 1 | 0 |
| 90 | AM | (Brazil) Diego Minete | 0+1 | 0 | 0 | 0 | 0 | 0 | 0 | 0 | 0+1 | 0 | 0 | 0 |
| 72 | CF | (Brazil) Bruno Lopes | 0 | 0 | 0+1 | 0 | 0 | 0 | 0+1 | 0 | 0+2 | 0 | 0 | 0 |
Players left during the season
| 12 | LB | (Brazil) Victor Luís | 1 | 0 | 0 | 0 | 0 | 0 | 0 | 0 | 1 | 0 | 0 | 0 |
| 64 | CB | (Brazil) Walace Falcão | 0 | 0 | 0 | 0 | 0 | 0 | 1+2 | 0 | 1+2 | 0 | 0 | 0 |
| 25 | DM | (Brazil) Hugo Moura | 3+2 | 0 | 7+4 | 1 | 0+1 | 0 | 4 | 0 | 14+7 | 1 | 2 | 0 |
| 26 | CM | (Switzerland) Maxime Dominguez | 0+1 | 0 | 0 | 0 | 0 | 0 | 0 | 0 | 0+1 | 0 | 0 | 0 |
| 98 | CM | (Brazil) JP | 1+2 | 0 | 0+2 | 0 | 0 | 0 | 3+1 | 0 | 4+5 | 0 | 2 | 1 |
| 9 | AM / SS | (Brazil) Matheus França | 1 | 0 | 0+3 | 0 | 0+1 | 0 | 1+2 | 1 | 2+6 | 1 | 2 | 0 |
| 10 | AM | (Brazil) Philippe Coutinho | 4 | 2 | 3 | 1 | 0 | 0 | 0 | 0 | 7 | 3 | 1 | 0 |
| 14 | AM | (Brazil) Guilherme Estrella | 0+1 | 0 | 0 | 0 | 0 | 0 | 0 | 0 | 0+1 | 0 | 0 | 0 |
| 15 | RW | (Argentina) Benjamín Garré | 1 | 0 | 0 | 0 | 0 | 0 | 0 | 0 | 1 | 0 | 0 | 0 |
| 19 | CF | (Brazil) GB | 3 | 0 | 0+2 | 0 | 0 | 0 | 0 | 0 | 3+2 | 0 | 0 | 0 |
| 77 | CF | (Brazil) Rayan | 1 | 2 | 0 | 0 | 0 | 0 | 0 | 0 | 1 | 2 | 0 | 0 |
| 99 | CF | (Argentina) Pablo Vegetti | 0+1 | 0 | 0 | 0 | 0 | 0 | 0 | 0 | 0+1 | 0 | 0 | 0 |
