= 2023–24 KRC Genk season =

K.R.C. Genk
2023–24 season
- Chairman: Peter Croonen
- Manager: Wouter Vrancken
- Stadium: Cegeka Arena
- Belgian Pro League Regular season: 6th
- Champions' Play-offs: 5th
- Belgian Cup: Eighth round
- UEFA Champions League: Second qualifying round
- UEFA Europa League: Third qualifying round
- UEFA Europa Conference League: Group stage
- Top goalscorer: League: Tolu Arokodare (12); All: Tolu Arokodare (15)
- Average home league attendance: 18,372
Home colours	Away colours	Third colours

The 2023–24 season was K.R.C. Genk's 36th season in existence, and 28th consecutive in the Belgian Pro League. They also competed in the Belgian Cup, the UEFA Champions League, the UEFA Europa League and the UEFA Europa Conference League.

== Players ==
=== First-team squad ===
As of 7 September 2023

Note: Flags indicate national team as defined under FIFA eligibility rules; some limited exceptions apply. Players may hold more than one non-FIFA nationality.

No.	Pos.	Nation	Player
1	GK	BEL	Hendrik Van Crombrugge
2	DF	USA	Mark McKenzie
3	DF	ESP	Mujaid Sadick
4	MF	CIV	Aziz Ouattara Mohammed
5	DF	MEX	Gerardo Arteaga
7	MF	GAM	Alieu Fadera
8	MF	BEL	Bryan Heynen (captain)
9	FW	SUI	Andi Zeqiri
14	MF	NGR	Yira Sor
17	MF	SVK	Patrik Hrošovský
18	DF	COD	Joris Kayembe
19	MF	BEL	Anouar Ait El Hadj
23	DF	COL	Daniel Muñoz

No.	Pos.	Nation	Player
24	MF	BEL	Luca Oyen
25	MF	ARG	Matías Galarza
26	GK	BEL	Maarten Vandevoordt
28	FW	GHA	Joseph Paintsil
30	GK	BEL	Vic Chambaere
34	MF	MAR	Bilal El Khannous
41	GK	BEL	Mike Penders
46	DF	COL	Carlos Cuesta
70	MF	GUI	Ibrahima Sory Bangoura
77	MF	MAR	Zakaria El Ouahdi
90	MF	GHA	Christopher Bonsu Baah
99	FW	NGR	Tolu Arokodare

=== Out on loan ===
Note: Flags indicate national team as defined under FIFA eligibility rules; some limited exceptions apply. Players may hold more than one non-FIFA nationality.

No.	Pos.	Nation	Player
—	DF	DEN	Rasmus Carstensen (at 1. FC Köln until 30 June 2024)

No.	Pos.	Nation	Player
—	MF	ARG	Nicolás Castro (at Elche until 30 June 2024)
—	MF	BEL	Mike Trésor (at Burnley until June 30, 2024)

== Transfers ==
=== In ===
Pos.	Player	Transferred from	Fee	Date	Source
DF	(Belgium) Hendrik Van Crombrugge	(Belgium) Anderlecht	€1,300,000	18 July 2023	

=== Out ===
Pos.	Player	Transferred to	Fee	Date	Source
DF	(Denmark) Rasmus Carstensen	(Germany) 1. FC Köln	Loan	3 August 2023	
GK	(Belgium) Tobe Leysen	(Belgium) OH Leuven	Undisclosed	19 August 2023	
MF	(Belgium) Mike Trésor	(England) Burnley	Loan	1 September 2023	

== Pre-season and friendlies ==
Win Draw Loss Fixtures

1 July 2023 Friendly	Genk (Belgium)	3–0	(Belgium) Tienen	Genk
16:00 UTC+2				Stadium: Terrain 't Heke

12 July 2023 Friendly	PAOK (Greece)	3–2	(Belgium) Genk	Swolgen, Netherlands
18:00 UTC+2				Stadium: Sportpark Sporting Swolgen Tienray

15 July 2023 Friendly	Genk (Belgium)	3–3	(Belgium) Zulte Waregem
12:00 UTC+2

19 July 2023 Friendly	Sporting CP (Portugal)	1–1	(Belgium) Genk	Faro/Loulé, Portugal
20:30 UTC+1				Stadium: Estádio Algarve

22 July 2023 Friendly	Genk (Belgium)	2–0	(England) Burnley	Genk
18:30 UTC+2				Stadium: Cegeka Arena

== Competitions ==
=== Overall record ===
Competition	First match	Last match	Starting round	Final position	Record							
Competition	First match	Last match	Starting round	Final position	Pld	W	D	L	GF	GA	GD	Win %
Belgian Pro League	29 July 2023	17 March 2024	Matchday 1	6th	30	12	11	7	51	31	+20	40.00
Champions' Play-offs	1 April 2024	26 May 2024	Matchday 1		9	4	1	4	8	15	−7	44.44
Belgian Cup	1 November 2023	6 December 2023	Seventh round	Eighth round	2	1	0	1	5	3	+2	50.00
UEFA Champions League	25 July 2023	2 August 2023	Second qualifying round	Second qualifying round	2	0	2	0	3	3	+0	0.00
UEFA Europa League	10 August 2023	17 August 2023	Third qualifying round	Third qualifying round	2	0	1	1	1	2	−1	0.00
UEFA Europa Conference League	24 August 2023	14 December 2023	Second qualifying round	Group stage	8	3	3	2	11	8	+3	37.50
Total					53	20	18	15	79	62	+17	37.74

Last updated: 20 May 2024
Source: Soccerway

=== Belgian Pro League ===
==== League table ====
Pos	Team	Pld	W	D	L	GF	GA	GD	Pts	Qualification or relegation
4	Club Brugge	30	14	9	7	62	29	+33	51	Qualification for the champions' play-offs
5	Cercle Brugge	30	14	5	11	44	34	+10	47	Qualification for the champions' play-offs
6	Genk	30	12	11	7	51	31	+20	47	Qualification for the champions' play-offs
7	Gent	30	12	11	7	53	38	+15	47	Qualification for the Europe play-offs
8	Mechelen	30	13	6	11	39	34	+5	45	Qualification for the Europe play-offs

Source: Jupiler Pro League (in Dutch), Soccerway
Rules for classification: 1) Points; 2) Matches won; 3) Goal difference; 4) Goals scored; 5) Away matches won; 6) Away goal difference; 7) Away goals scored; 8) Play-off.

==== Results summary ====
Overall								Home						Away					
Pld	W	D	L	GF	GA	GD	Pts	W	D	L	GF	GA	GD	W	D	L	GF	GA	GD
30	12	11	7	50	32	+18	47	6	6	3	27	18	+9	6	5	4	23	14	+9

Last updated: 16 September 2023.

==== Results by round ====
Round	1	2	3	4	5	6	7	8	9	10	11	12	13	14	15	16	17
Ground	A	H	A	H	A	H	A	H	H	A	H	A	A	H	A	H	A
Result	W	L	W	D	D	D	W	D	D	D	W	W	L	W	L	D	W
Position	1	6	5	6	8	9	6	7	6	7	5	5	5	4	6	7	5

Updated to match(es) played on 16 September 2023. Source: Worldfootball
A = Away; H = Home; W = Win; D = Draw; L = Loss

==== Matches ====
The league fixtures were unveiled on 22 June 2023.

29 July 2023 1	RWD Molenbeek	0–4	Genk	Molenbeek-Saint-Jean
20:45 CEST (UTC+2)	Abner (yellow card) 81'	Report	Fadera 31'; Heynen 38' (pen.); Muñoz 45'; Cuesta 71'	Stadium: Edmond Machtens Stadium; Attendance: 5,600; Referee: Wesli De Cremer

5 August 2023 2	Genk	0–1	Eupen	Genk
16:00 CEST (UTC+2)	McKenzie (yellow card) 50'	Report	Charles-Cook 2'; Nuhu (yellow card) 33'; Nurudeen (yellow card) 75'	Stadium: Cegeka Arena; Attendance: 14,230; Referee: Wim Smet

13 August 2023 3	Cercle Brugge	0–1	Genk	Bruges
16:00 CEST (UTC+2)	Popović (yellow card) 53'; Francis (yellow card) 86'	Report	Ait El Hadj (yellow card) 42'; Warleson 71' (o.g.); Kayembe (yellow card) 73'; Muñoz (yellow card) 78'	Stadium: Jan Breydel Stadium; Attendance: 3,976; Referee: Bert Put

20 August 2023 4	Genk	0–0	Charleroi	Genk
16:00 CEST (UTC+2)		Report		Stadium: Cegeka Arena; Attendance: 13,531; Referee: Kevin Van Damme

3 September 2023 6	Genk	1–1	Anderlecht	Genk
18:30 CEST (UTC+2)	Bonsu Baah (yellow card) 9' (yellow-red card) 15'; Muñoz (yellow card) 86'; Arteaga (yellow card) 89'; Heynen (yellow card) 90'; Arokodare 90+7'	Report	Vertonghen (yellow card) 9'; Delaney (yellow card) 24'; Debast (yellow card) 32'; Flips (yellow card) 49'; Rits (yellow card) 54'; Amuzu 71'; Vázquez (yellow card) 89'	Stadium: Cegeka Arena; Attendance: 20,655; Referee: Bram Van Driessche

16 September 2023 7	Union Saint-Gilloise	0–2	Genk	Brussels
18:15 CEST (UTC+2)	Vanhoutte (yellow card) 34'	Report	Zeqiri 16'; Oyen (yellow card) 29'; El Khannous (yellow card) 43'; Muñoz (yellow card) 45+1'; Galarza (yellow card) 45+3', (goal) 90+2'; Paintsil (yellow card) 51'; Kayembe (yellow card) 56'	Stadium: Joseph Marien Stadium; Attendance: 6,983; Referee: Lawrence Visser

24 September 2023 8	Genk	3–3	Sint-Truiden	Genk
13:30 CEST (UTC+2)	El Khannous (yellow card) 15', (goal) 58'; Cuesta (yellow card) 20'; Arokodare 71'; Paintsil 85'		Godeau (yellow card) 4'; Koita 31', 36', 37'; Kaya (yellow card) 45'; Hashioka (yellow card) 54'; Barnes (yellow card) 90+5'	Stadium: Cegeka Arena; Attendance: 19,834; Referee: Lothar D'hondt

28 September 2023 5	Club Brugge	1–1	Genk	Bruges
20:45 CEST (UTC+2)	Odoi (yellow card) 44'; Nielsen (yellow card) 51'; Vanaken 67'; Skov Olsen (yellow card) 78'; Balanta (yellow card) 90+3'		Hrosovsky (yellow card) 40'; El Khannous 45+1'	Stadium: Jan Breydel Stadium; Attendance: 20,220; Referee: Jonathan Lardot
Note: The match scheduled for 27 August 2023 was postponed due to the UEFA Conference League play-offs.

1 October 2023 9	Genk	3–3	Westerlo	Genk
16:00 CEST (UTC+2)	Muñoz (yellow card) 6', (goal) 10'; Bonsu Baah (yellow card) 43' (red card) 45+3'; Kayembe 45'; Paintsil 49'		Stassin 19', 59'; Jordanov (yellow card) 31'; Tagir (yellow card) 83'; Rommens 88'	Stadium: Cegeka Arena; Attendance: 17,143; Referee: Wesli De Cremer

8 October 2023 10	Gent	1–1	Genk	Ghent
18:30 CEST (UTC+2)	Kums (yellow card) 70'; Samoise 84'		Fadera (yellow card) 23'; Zeqiri (yellow card) 60', (goal) 63'; Galarza (yellow card) 70'	Stadium: Ghelamco Arena; Attendance: 16,406; Referee: Jasper Vergoote

22 October 2023 11	Genk	4–0	Mechelen	Genk
13:30 CEST (UTC+2)	Bonsu Baah 16'; Heynen 41'; McKenzie (yellow card) 60'; El Khannous 75'; Ait El Hadj 90+1'		Foulon (yellow card) 61'; Cobbaut (yellow card) 65'	Stadium: Cegeka Arena; Attendance: 17,923; Referee: Jan Boterberg

29 October 2023 12	Kortrijk	0–3	Genk	Kortrijk
18:15 CET (UTC+1)	Avenatti (yellow card) 21'; El Idrissy (yellow card) 33'; Malinov (yellow card) 39'		Paintsil (yellow card) 17', (goal) 73'; Arokodare 56'; Cuesta (yellow card) 68'; Muñoz 79'	Stadium: Guldensporen Stadion; Attendance: 6,553; Referee: Bert Put

4 November 2023 13	Antwerp	3–2	Genk	Antwerp
19:45 CET (UTC+1)	Janssen 5', (yellow card) 47'; Balikwisha 11', 39'; Muja (yellow card) 51'; Yusuf (yellow card) 68'		Zeqiri 45'; Paintsil (yellow card) 45+2'; Hrosovsky (yellow card) 45+5'; El Khannous (yellow card) 68'; Bonsu Baah (yellow card) 90+2'; Muñoz 90+9'	Stadium: Bosuilstadion; Attendance: 16,071; Referee: Lothar D'hondt

12 November 2023 14	Genk	3–1	OH Leuven	Genk
16:00 CET (UTC+1)	Heynen 25', 90'; Bonsu Baah (yellow card) 67'; Muñoz 90+5'; Zeqiri (yellow card) 90+6'		Miguel (yellow card) 10'; Þorsteinsson (yellow card) 56'; Opoku (yellow card) 80'; Brunes 85'; Schrijvers (yellow card) 89'	Stadium: Cegeka Arena; Attendance: 17,821; Referee: Wim Smet

25 November 2023 15	Standard Liège	1–0	Genk	Liège
19:45 CET (UTC+1)	Kawabe 66'; Ngoy (yellow card) 86'; Dewaele (yellow card) 90+6'		Heynen (yellow card) 90+2'; Galarza (yellow card) 90+6'	Stadium: Stade Maurice Dufrasne; Attendance: 21,113; Referee: Wesli De Cremer

3 December 2023 16	Genk	2–2	Gent	Genk
13:30 CET (UTC+1)	Sor 21', 51', (yellow card) 73'; Fadera (yellow card) 66'		Tissoudali 12', 90+9'; Kums (yellow card) 57'; Fortuna (yellow card) 71'	Stadium: Cegeka Arena; Attendance: 18,319; Referee: Nicolas Laforge

10 December 2023 17	Eupen	1–3	Genk	Eupen
16:00 CET (UTC+1)	Charles-Cook 65'	Report	Sor 45+3'; Fadera (yellow card) 53'; Paintsil 56'; Cuesta (yellow card) 80'; Arokodare 90+2'	Stadium: Kehrwegstadion; Attendance: 8.363; Referee: Simon Bourdeaud'Hui

17 December 2023 18	Genk	4-0	Kortrijk	Genk
19:15 CET (UTC+1)	Paintsil 23', 54'; Sor 49'; Heynen 60'	Report	Avenatti (yellow card) 45+1'; Mampassi (yellow card) 58'	Stadium: Cegeka Arena; Attendance: 24.956; Referee: B. Van Driessche

23 December 2023 19	Anderlecht	2-1	Genk	Anderlecht
20:45 CET (UTC+1)	Leoni 74', (yellow card) 84'; Dreyer 90+1'	Report	Kayembe (yellow card) 44'; Fadera 70'; Muñoz (yellow card) 79'; Paintsil (yellow card) 90+1' (yellow-red card) 90+2'; Sadick (yellow card) 90+10'	Stadium: Lotto Park; Attendance: 28.063; Referee: Nathan Verboomen

26 December 2023 20	Genk	2-1	Antwerp	Genk
13:30 CET (UTC+1)	Fadera 10'; Arokodare 75', 77'; Arteaga (yellow card) 83'	Report	De Laet (yellow card) 23'; Keita (yellow card) 47'; Coulibaly (yellow card) 66'	Stadium: Cegeka Arena; Attendance: 24.956; Referee: Jonathan Lardot

20 January 2024 21	Genk	1-1	Cercle Brugge	Genk
16:00 CET (UTC+1)	Zeqiri 64'; Cuesta (yellow card) 82'; Ait El Hadj (yellow card) 90'	Report	Denkey 8'; Utkus (yellow card) 38'; Lopes (yellow card) 79'	Stadium: Cegeka Arena; Attendance: 24.956; Referee: Jasper Vergoote

28 January 2024 22	Sint-Truiden	1-1	Genk	Sint-Truiden
14:00 CET (UTC+1)	Zahiroleslam (yellow card) 85'; Itō 90'	Report	Sor 2'; Heynen (yellow card) 73' (yellow-red card) 90+6'; Arteaga (red card) 85'; Galarza (yellow card) 85'; El Ouahdi (yellow card) 90'	Stadium: Daio Wasabi Stayen Stadium; Attendance: 14600; Referee: Lothar D'hondt

31 January 2024 23	OH Leuven	2-1	Genk	Heverlee
18:45 CET (UTC+1)	Schrijvers (yellow card) 45+3', (goal) 80' (pen.); Þorsteinsson (yellow card) 47'; Pletinckx 90'	Report	Hrošovský (yellow card) 22'; Paintsil (yellow card) 45+3'; Ricca 54'; Galarza (yellow card) 79'; El Ouahdi (yellow card) 82'; Cuesta (yellow card) 82'	Stadium: King Power at Den Dreef; Attendance: 12500; Referee: Brent Staessens

3 Februari 2024 24	Genk	0-1	Union Saint-Gilloise	Genk
20:45 CET (UTC+1)	Hrošovský (yellow card) 53'	Report	Moris (yellow card) 16'; Burgess (yellow card) 25'; Amoura 67'; Nilsson (yellow card) 71'; Vanhoutte (yellow card) 90+2'	Stadium: Cegeka Arena; Attendance: 24.956; Referee: Erik Lambrechts

11 Februari 2024 25	Mechelen	1-1	Genk	Mechelen
16:00 CET (UTC+1)	Schoofs 38'; Mukau (yellow card) 66'	Report	El Ouahdi (yellow card) 12'; Burgess 32'; Paintsil (yellow card) 72'	Stadium: AFAS Stadion; Attendance: 16.715; Referee: Bram Van Driessche

17 Februari 2024 26	Genk	3-1	RWDM Molenbeek	Genk
16:00 CET (UTC+1)	Arokodare 21'; Oyen 35'; Cuesta (yellow card) 50'; Zeqiri 90+2'	Report	Gomes 2'; Dwomoh (yellow card) 69'; Camara (yellow card) 81'	Stadium: Cegeka Arena; Attendance: 21.000; Referee: Michiel Allaerts

23 Februari 2024 27	Charleroi	0-1	Genk	Charleroi
20:45 CET (UTC+1)	Sylla (yellow card) 44'; Ilaimaharitra (yellow card) 78'	Report	Arokodare (yellow card) 45+1'; Sor 71'; El Khannouss (yellow card) 90+3'	Stadium: Mambourg; Attendance: 18.000; Referee: Kevin Van Damme

3 March 2024 28	Genk	0-3	Club Brugge	Genk
13:30 CET (UTC+1)	McKenzie (yellow card) 31'; Zeqiri (yellow card) 90+3'	Report	Vetlesen 26', (yellow card) 53'; Odoi 73'; Skov Olsen 85' (pen.)	Stadium: Cegeka Arena; Attendance: 24.956; Referee: Jasper Vergoote

10 March 2024 29	Genk	1-0	Standard Liège	Genk
13:30 CET (UTC+1)	Ait El Hadj 51'	Report	Dewaele (yellow card) 55'; Doumbia (yellow card) 60'	Stadium: Cegeka Arena; Attendance: 24.956; Referee: Jonathan Lardot

17 March 2024 30	Westerlo	1-1	Genk	Westerlo
18:30 CET (UTC+1)	Sydorchuk (yellow card) 32'; Bolat (yellow card) 74'; Bos (yellow card) 75'; Tagir 80'	Report	Cuesta (yellow card) 59'; Bonsu Baah (red card) 71'; Heynen 86'	Stadium: Het Kuipje; Attendance: 8.035; Referee: Lawrence Visser

==== Champions' Play-offs ====
Pos	Team	Pld	W	D	L	GF	GA	GD	Pts	Qualification or relegation
1	Club Brugge (C)	10	7	3	0	21	6	+15	50	Qualification for the Champions League league stage
2	Union SG	10	4	2	4	17	12	+5	49	Qualification for the Champions League third qualifying round
3	Anderlecht	10	4	2	4	12	12	0	46	Qualification for the Europa League play-off round
4	Cercle Brugge	10	3	4	3	13	13	0	37	Qualification for the Europa League second qualifying round (Note: Union SG qualified for the Europa League play-off round by winning the 2023–24 Belgian Cup. The Europa League second qualifying spot and the European competition play-off spot were thus passed to the next two highest-placed teams that did not qualify for European competitions.)
5	Genk	10	4	1	5	8	17	−9	37	Qualification for the European competition play-off
6	Antwerp	10	2	0	8	7	18	−11	32	

Source: Jupiler Pro League (in Dutch), Soccerway
Rules for classification: 1) Points; 2) Points without (possible) half points added due to rounding; 3) Regular season finishing position.
(C) Champions

==== Results summary ====
Overall								Home						Away					
Pld	W	D	L	GF	GA	GD	Pts	W	D	L	GF	GA	GD	W	D	L	GF	GA	GD
10	4	1	5	8	17	−9	13	3	1	1	5	5	0	1	0	4	3	12	−9

Last updated: 7 September 2025.
Source: https://fbref.com/en/squads/1e972a99/2023-2024/matchlogs/c37/schedule/Genk-Scores-and-Fixtures-Belgian-Pro-League

==== Results by round ====
Round	1
Ground	
Result	
Position	

Updated to match(es) played on 12 May 2024. Source:
A = Away; H = Home; W = Win; D = Draw; L = Loss

=== Belgian Cup ===
1 November 2023 Seventh round	Visé (3)	0–4	Genk (1)	Visé
16:00 CET	Marmot (yellow card) 45'; Graham (yellow card) 81'	Report	Sor 17'; Ouattara 51'; Zeqiri 82'; Baah 90+1'	Stadium: Stade de la Cité de l'Oie; Referee: Tim De Keyzer

6 December 2023 Eighth round	Oostende (2)	3–1 (a.e.t.)	Genk (1)	Ostend
19:00 CET	Basila 65'; D'Haese 112'; Hartwig 120+1'	Report	Bonsu Baah (yellow card) 25'; Ait El Hadj 69'; Heynen (yellow card) 116'	Stadium: Diaz Arena; Attendance: 2,249; Referee: Michiel Allaerts

=== UEFA Champions League ===
==== Second qualifying round ====
The draw for the second qualifying round was held on 21 June 2023.

25 July 2023 First leg	Servette (Switzerland)	1–1	(Belgium) Genk	Geneva, Switzerland
20:30 UTC+2	Douline (yellow card) 28'; Antunes (yellow card) 39'; Rouiller 77'; Guillemenot (yellow card) 90+2'	Report	Arokodare 21'; Muñoz (yellow card) 52'; Paintsil (yellow card) 80'; Cuesta (yellow card) 84'	Stadium: Stade de Genève; Attendance: 18,026; Referee: István Vad (Hungary)

2 August 2023 Second leg	Genk (Belgium)	2–2 (a.e.t.) (3–3 agg.) (1–4 p)	(Switzerland) Servette	Genk
19:00 UTC+2	Trésor 28' (pen.), (yellow card) 69'; Arokodare 51'; Paintsil (yellow card) 103'	Report	Crivelli (red card) 3'; Kutesa (yellow card) 6'; Cognat 36', (yellow card) 90+4'; Douline (yellow card) 40'; Bedia (yellow card) 42', (goal) 63'; Severin (yellow card) 84'; Rouiller (yellow card) 89'; Vouilloz (yellow card) 109'	Stadium: Cegeka Arena; Attendance: 16,280; Referee: Novak Simović (Serbia)
	Penalties
	Hrošovský (penalty missed); Cuesta (penalty scored); Arokodare (penalty missed)		(penalty scored) Touati; (penalty scored) Guillemenot; (penalty scored) Severin; (penalty scored) Rodelin

=== UEFA Europa League ===
==== Third qualifying round ====
The draw for the third qualifying round was held on 24 July 2023.

10 August 2023 First leg	Olympiacos (Greece)	1–0	(Belgium) Genk	Piraeus, Greece
22:00 UTC+3	Fortounis 1'; Iborra (yellow card) 3'; Quini (yellow card) 38'; Alexandropoulos (yellow card) 90+10'	Report	Galarza (yellow card) 3'; Bonsu Baah (yellow card) 90+10'	Stadium: Karaiskakis Stadium; Attendance: 24,123; Referee: Glenn Nyberg (Sweden)

17 August 2023 Second leg	Genk (Belgium)	1–1 (1–2 agg.)	(Greece) Olympiacos	Genk
20:00 UTC+2	Paintsil 30' (pen.) (red card) 65'; Fadera (yellow card) 56'	Report	Masouras (yellow card) 45'; Rodinei (yellow card) 54' (yellow-red card) 90+10'; Camara (yellow card) 56'; Quini (yellow card) 65'; Fortounis (yellow card) 78'; Biel (yellow card) 83'; Freire (yellow card) 90'; Alexandropoulos 90+6'	Stadium: Cegeka Arena; Attendance: 11,998; Referee: Tobias Stieler (Germany)

=== UEFA Europa Conference League ===
==== Play-off round ====
The draw for the play-off round was held on 7 August 2023.

24 August 2023 First leg	Genk (Belgium)	2–1	(Turkey) Adana Demirspor	Genk
20:00 UTC+2	McKenzie (yellow card) 24'; Muñoz (yellow card) 60', (goal) 90+3'; Arokodare 77'; Bonsu Baah (yellow card) 90+6'	Report	Gravillon (yellow card) 23'; Akbaba 47'; Belhanda (yellow card) 50'; B. Ndiaye (yellow card) 90+11'	Stadium: Cegeka Arena; Attendance: 9,460; Referee: António Nobre (Portugal)

31 August 2023 Second leg	Adana Demirspor (Turkey)	1–0 (a.e.t.) (2–2 agg.) (4–5 p)	(Belgium) Genk	Adana, Turkey
21:00 UTC+3	C. Ndiaye (penalty missed) 45+10', 45+10'; Akbaba (yellow card) 64'; Belhanda (yellow card) 78'; Rodrigues (yellow card) 90+5'; Stambouli (yellow card) 120+2'	Report	Fadera (yellow card) 25'; Arokodare (yellow card) 90+1'	Stadium: New Adana Stadium; Attendance: 24,986; Referee: José Luis Munuera Montero (Spain)
	Penalties
	Niang (penalty scored); Stambouli (penalty scored); Belhanda (penalty missed); Sari (penalty scored); David (penalty scored)		(penalty scored) Heynen; (penalty scored) Bonsu Baah; (penalty scored) Ait El Hadj; (penalty scored) Ouattara; (penalty scored) Arokodare

==== Group stage ====
The draw for the group stage will be held on 1 September 2023.

Pos	Team	Pld	W	D	L	GF	GA	GD	Pts	Qualification	FIO	FER	GNK	ČUK
1	(Italy) Fiorentina	6	3	3	0	14	6	+8	12	Advance to round of 16	—	2–2	2–1	6–0
2	(Hungary) Ferencváros	6	2	4	0	9	6	+3	10	Advance to knockout round play-offs	1–1	—	1–1	3–1
3	(Belgium) Genk	6	2	3	1	8	5	+3	9		2–2	0–0	—	2–0
4	(Serbia) Čukarički	6	0	0	6	2	16	−14	0		0–1	1–2	0–2	—

Source: UEFA
Rules for classification: Group stage tiebreakers

21 September 2023 1	Genk (Belgium)	2–2	(Italy) Fiorentina	Genk
18:45 CEST (UTC+2)	Zeqiri 12'; Muñoz (yellow card) 29'; McKenzie 85'	Report	Ranieri 7', 23'; Mandragora (yellow card) 33'; Biraghi (yellow card) 45'	Stadium: Cegeka Arena; Attendance: 11,243; Referee: Stéphanie Frappart (France)

5 October 2023 2	Čukarički (Serbia)	0–2	(Belgium) Genk	Belgrade, Serbia
21:00 CEST (UTC+2)	Subotić (yellow card) 85'; Miladinović (yellow card) 90+2'	Report	Heynen 10'; Paintsil 21' (pen.)	Stadium: Čukarički Stadium; Attendance: 2,447; Referee: Adam Ladebäck (Sweden)

26 October 2023 3	Genk (Belgium)	0–0	(Hungary) Ferencvárosi	Genk
21:00 CEST (UTC+2)	Arteaga (yellow card) 29'; El Khannous (yellow card) 59'; Arokodare (red card) 90+3'	Report	Botka (yellow card) 40'	Stadium: Cegeka Arena; Attendance: 10,597; Referee: Aleksandar Stavrev (North Macedonia)

9 November 2023 4	Ferencvárosi (Hungary)	1–1	(Belgium) Genk	Ferencváros, Hungary
18:45 CET (UTC+1)	Pešić 48'; Abu Fani (yellow card) 80'	Report	Sadick (yellow card) 43'; El Khannous (yellow card) 55'; Muñoz (yellow card) 58', (goal) 62'; Paintsil (yellow card) 73'	Stadium: Ferencváros Stadion; Attendance: 20,127; Referee: Aleksei Kulbakov (Belarus)

30 November 2023 5	Fiorentina (Italy)	2–1	(Belgium) Genk	Florence, Italy
21:00 CET (UTC+1)	Martínez Quarta (yellow card) 28', (goal) 45+4'; González 82' (pen.); Milenković (yellow card) 90+2'; Biraghi (yellow card) 90+7'; Kouamé (yellow card) 90+7'	Report	Fadera (yellow card) 20'; Kayembe 45'; Muñoz (yellow card) 81'; Hrosovsky (yellow card) 89'; Paintsil (yellow card) 89'; Zeqiri (yellow card) 90+2'; Galarza (yellow card) 90+4'; Heynen (yellow card) 90+6'	Stadium: Stadio Artemio Franchi; Attendance: 16,666; Referee: Joey Kooij (Netherlands)

14 December 2023 6	Genk (Belgium)	2–0	(Serbia) Čukarički	Genk
18:45	Heynen 21'; Galarza (red card) 33'; Paintsil 57'; El Ouahdi (yellow card) 90+1'	Report	Sissoko (yellow card) 32'; Adžić (yellow card) 50'; Singh (yellow card) 90+3'	Stadium: Cegeka Arena; Attendance: 10,423; Referee: Trustin Farrugia Cann (Malta)

== Statistics ==
=== Squad appearances and goals ===
Last updated on 14 December 2023

No.	Pos	Nat	Player	Total		Belgian Division		Belgian Cup		Champions League		Europa League		Conference League	
No.	Pos	Nat	Player	Apps	Goals	Apps	Goals	Apps	Goals	Apps	Goals	Apps	Goals	Apps	Goals
Goalkeepers
1	GK	(Belgium) BEL	Hendrik Van Crombrugge	4	0	0	0	2	0	0	0	0	0	2	0
26	GK	(Belgium) BEL	Maarten Vandevoordt	27	0	17	0	0	0	2	0	2	0	6	0
30	GK	(Belgium) BEL	Vic Chambaere	0	0	0	0	0	0	0	0	0	0	0	0
41	GK	(Belgium) BEL	Mike Penders	0	0	0	0	0	0	0	0	0	0	0	0
Defenders
2	DF	(United States) USA	Mark McKenzie	21	1	9	0	2	0	2	0	2	0	6	1
3	DF	(Spain) ESP	Mujaid Sadick	20	0	13	0	1	0	0	0	0	0	6	0
5	DF	(Mexico) MEX	Gerardo Arteaga	19	0	11+1	0	0	0	1	0	0+1	0	4+1	0
18	DF	(Democratic Republic of the Congo) COD	Joris Kayembe	16	2	6	1	2	0	2	0	2	0	4	1
23	DF	(Colombia) COL	Daniel Muñoz	26	7	13+1	5	0+1	0	2	0	2	0	7	2
46	DF	(Colombia) COL	Carlos Cuesta	21	1	12	1	1	0	2	0	2	0	4	0
Midfielders
4	MF	(Ivory Coast) CIV	Aziz Ouattara Mohammed	15	1	3+5	0	2	1	0+2	0	1+1	0	0+1	0
7	MF	(Tanzania) TAN	Mbwana Samatta	21	1	7+4	1	0	0	1+1	0	1+1	0	5+1	0
8	MF	(Belgium) BEL	Bryan Heynen	24	6	13+1	4	0+1	0	2	0	0	0	6+1	2
14	MF	(Nigeria) NGR	Yira Sor	21	4	6+4	3	1+1	1	0+1	0	1+1	0	3+3	0
17	MF	(Slovakia) SVK	Patrik Hrošovský	29	0	9+7	0	1+1	0	2	0	2	0	5+2	0
19	MF	(Belgium) BEL	Anouar Ait El Hadj	12	2	2+2	1	2	1	0+2	0	0	0	0+4	0
24	MF	(Belgium) BEL	Luca Oyen	14	0	3+4	0	2	0	0	0	0+1	0	3+1	0
25	MF	(Argentina) ARG	Matías Galarza	29	1	11+4	1	1+1	0	0+2	0	1+1	0	6+2	0
34	MF	(Morocco) MAR	Bilal El Khannous	31	3	15+2	3	0+2	0	2	0	2	0	7+1	0
70	MF	(Guinea) GUI	Ibrahima Sory Bangoura	0	0	0	0	0	0	0	0	0	0	0	0
77	MF	(Morocco) MAR	Zakaria El Ouahdi	6	0	3	0	2	0	0	0	0	0	1	0
90	MF	(Ghana) GHA	Christopher Bonsu Baah	28	1	6+9	1	1+1	0	0+1	0	0+2	0	3+5	0
Forwards
9	FW	(Switzerland) SUI	Andi Zeqiri	17	5	7+3	3	1+1	1	0	0	0	0	3+2	1
28	FW	(Ghana) GHA	Joseph Paintsil	27	7	15+2	4	0+1	0	2	0	2	1	5	2
99	FW	(Nigeria) NGR	Tolu Arokodare	29	8	4+13	4	1	1	2	2	1+1	0	2+5	1
Players who have made an appearance this season but have left the club
11	MF	(Belgium) BEL	Mike Trésor	6	1	1+1	0	0	0	1+1	1	1+1	0	0	0
