= Matías Galarza =

Matías Galarza may refer to:

- Matías Galarza (Argentine footballer) (born 2002), Argentine football midfielder for Genk
- Matías Galarza (Paraguayan footballer) (born 2002), Paraguayan football midfielder for Coritiba
