= Christopher Bonsu Baah =

Ghanaian footballer (born 2004)

Personal information
- Date of birth: 14 December 2004 (age 21)
- Place of birth: Ghana
- Height: 1.72 m (5 ft 8 in)
- Positions: Right winger; attacking midfielder

Team information
- Current team: Al-Qadsiah
- Number: 22

Youth career
- Accra Shooting Stars

Senior career*
Years	Team	Apps	(Gls)
2023	Sarpsborg 08	12	(1)
2023–2025	Genk	72	(4)
2025–	Al-Qadsiah	39	(4)

International career^{‡}
2025–	Ghana	9	(0)
- * Club domestic league appearances and goals as of 9 October 2026 ‡ National team caps and goals as of 16:46, 2 June 2025 (UTC)

Christopher Bonsu Baah (born 14 December 2004) is a Ghanaian professional footballer who plays as a forward for Saudi Pro League side Al-Qadsiah and the Ghana national team.

== Club career ==
=== Sarpsborg ===
Bonsu Baah joined Norwegian Eliteserien side Sarpsborg 08 from Ghanaian second division side Accra Shooting Stars in March 2023. The Norwegian side stated in their announcement that Bonsu Baah had previously trialed with Borussia Dortmund, Midtjylland, Barcelona and Manchester United.

Bonsu Baah scored his first goal for Sarpsborg in a 3–1 win against Aalesund, and his impressive performances for the club earned him a place on the 2023 Golden Boy longlist.

=== Genk ===
On 6 July 2023, only four months after joining Sarpsborg, Bonsu Baah signed for Belgian Pro League side Genk on a five-year deal.

=== Al-Qadsiah ===
On 7 July 2025, Bonsu Baah joined Saudi Arabian side Al-Qadsiah on a four-year deal.

== International career ==
Bonsu Baah was called up to the Ghana national team for the 2025 Unity Cup.

On 2 June 2026, Bonsu Baah was named in head coach Carlos Queiroz's 26-man squad for the 2026 FIFA World Cup.

== Style of play ==
A left-footed right-winger, also capable of playing as an attacking midfielder, Bonsu Baah led the Norwegian Eliteserien with 57 successful dribbles and 10 chances created, during his time with Sarpsborg.

== Career statistics ==
As of match played 3 May 2025

Appearances and goals by club, season and competition
Club	Season	League			National cup (Note: Includes Norwegian Football Cup, Belgian Cup)		Continental		Total	
Club	Season	Division	Apps	Goals	Apps	Goals	Apps	Goals	Apps	Goals
Sarpsborg 08	2023	Eliteserien	12	1	3	0	–		15	1
Genk	2023–24	Belgian Pro League	34	1	2	1	11 (Note: One appearance in UEFA Champions League, two appearances in UEFA Europa League, eight appearances in UEFA Conference League)	0	47	2
Genk	2024–25	Belgian Pro League	35	3	4	0	–		39	3
Genk	Total		69	4	6	1	11	0	85	5
Career total			81	5	9	1	11	0	101	6
