= Ramon Rique =

Brazilian footballer

Personal information
- Full name: Ramon Rique Santos de Souza Barros
- Date of birth: 2 October 2007 (age 19)
- Place of birth: Rio de Janeiro, Brazil
- Height: 1.80 m (5 ft 11 in)
- Position: Midfielder

Team information
- Current team: Vasco da Gama
- Number: 83

Youth career
- 2020–2026: Vasco da Gama

Senior career*
Years	Team	Apps	(Gls)
2026–	Vasco da Gama	1	(0)
- * Club domestic league appearances and goals as of 13:41, 12 May 2026 (UTC)

Ramon Rique Santos de Souza Barros (born 2 October 2007), known as Ramon Rique, is a Brazilian professional footballer who plays as a midfielder for Vasco da Gama.

== Career ==
Born in Rio de Janeiro, Ramon Rique joined Vasco da Gama's youth sides in February 2020, aged 12. He signed his first professional contract with the club on 24 October 2023, agreeing to a three-year deal.

On 9 October 2025, Ramon Rique further extended his link with Vasco until September 2029. He made his first team debut on 30 April 2026, starting in a 3–0 home win over Olimpia, for the year's Copa Sudamericana.

In May 2026, Rique was promoted to the first team by head coach Renato Gaúcho. In October 2026, Rique renewed his contract with Vasco da Gama until the end of 2030.

== Career statistics ==
As of 12 May 2026

Appearances and goals by club, season and competition
Club	Season	League			State League		National Cup		Continental		Other		Total	
Club	Season	Division	Apps	Goals	Apps	Goals	Apps	Goals	Apps	Goals	Apps	Goals	Apps	Goals
Vasco da Gama	2026	Série A	1	0	—		0	0	2 (Note: Appearance(s) in Copa Sudamericana)	0	—		3	0
Career total			1	0	0	0	0	0	2	0	0	0	3	0
