= Carlos Cuesta (footballer) =

Colombian footballer (born 1999)

Personal information
- Full name: Carlos Eccehomo Cuesta Figueroa
- Date of birth: 9 March 1999 (age 27)
- Place of birth: Quibdó, Colombia
- Height: 1.79 m (5 ft 10 in)
- Position: Centre-back

Team information
- Current team: Vasco da Gama (on loan from Galatasaray)
- Number: 46

Youth career
- Atlético Nacional

Senior career*
Years	Team	Apps	(Gls)
2016–2019	Atlético Nacional	61	(0)
2019–2025	Genk	151	(4)
2025–	Galatasaray	5	(0)
2025–	→ Vasco da Gama (loan)	33	(2)

International career^{‡}
2015	Colombia U17	3	(1)
2017–2019	Colombia U20	21	(1)
2021–	Colombia	24	(0)
Medal record
Representing Colombia
Men's football
Copa América
Runner-up	2024 United States
Third place	2021 Brazil
- * Club domestic league appearances and goals as of 22:45, 12 September 2026 (UTC) ‡ National team caps and goals as of 23:17, 15 November 2025 (UTC)

Carlos Eccehomo Cuesta Figueroa (9 March 1999) is a Colombian professional footballer who plays as a centre-back for Campeonato Brasileiro Série A club Vasco da Gama and the Colombia national team.

== Club career ==
=== Genk ===
On 5 July 2019, Belgian club Genk announced that they had signed Cuesta on a contract until June 2024.

=== Galatasaray ===
On 6 February 2025, Cuesta joined Turkish Süper Lig side Galatasaray for a transfer fee of €8.0m.

==== Vasco da Gama (loan) ====
Late into the summer 2025 transfer window, Cuesta joined Vasco da Gama on a season-long loan until summer 2026.

== International career ==
Cuesta made his debut for the Colombia national team on 9 September 2021 in a World Cup qualifier against Chile.

On 14 June 2024, Cuesta was named into 26-man squad for 2024 Copa América. In first match of the competition, Cuesta was an unused substitute, but because of Jhon Lucumí's injury he became his replacement for the rest of the tournament.

== Career statistics ==
=== Club ===
As of match played 12 September 2026

Appearances and goals by club, season and competition
Club	Season	League			National cup (Note: Includes Copa Colombia, Belgian Cup, Turkish Cup, Copa do Brasil)		Continental		Other		Total	
Club	Season	Division	Apps	Goals	Apps	Goals	Apps	Goals	Apps	Goals	Apps	Goals
Atlético Nacional	2016	Categoría Primera A	14	0	0	0	1 (Note: Appearance in Copa Sudamericana)	0	—		15	0
Atlético Nacional	2017	Categoría Primera A	30	0	4	0	3 (Note: Appearances in Copa Libertadores)	0	—		37	0
Atlético Nacional	2018	Categoría Primera A	11	0	3	0	0	0	2 (Note: Appearances in Superliga Colombiana)	0	16	0
Atlético Nacional	2019	Categoría Primera A	5	0	0	0	0	0	—		5	0
Atlético Nacional	Total		60	0	7	0	4	0	2	0	73	0
Genk	2019–20	Belgian Pro League	20	0	2	0	4 (Note: Appearances in UEFA Champions League)	0	1 (Note: Appearance in Belgian Super Cup)	0	27	0
Genk	2020–21	Belgian Pro League	34	0	4	0	0	0	0	0	38	0
Genk	2021–22	Belgian Pro League	21	1	0	0	5 (Note: One appearance in UEFA Champions League, four appearances in UEFA Europa League)	0	—		26	1
Genk	2022–23	Belgian Pro League	33	1	3	0	0	0	—		36	1
Genk	2023–24	Belgian Pro League	33	1	1	0	8 (Note: Two appearances in UEFA Champions League, two appearances in UEFA Europa League, four appearances in UEFA Europa Conference League)	0	—		42	1
Genk	2024–25	Belgian Pro League	10	1	3	0	—		—		13	1
Genk	Total		151	4	13	0	17	0	1	0	182	4
Galatasaray	2024–25	Süper Lig	5	0	2	0	2 (Note: Appearances in UEFA Europa League)	0	—		9	0
Vasco da Gama (loan)	2025	Série A	13	1	4	0	—		—		17	1
Vasco da Gama (loan)	2026	Série A	16	0	4	0	7	1	4 (Note: Appearances in Campeonato Carioca)	1	31	2
Vasco da Gama (loan)	Total		29	1	6	0	7	1	4	1	48	3
Career total			245	5	30	0	30	1	7	1	312	7

=== International ===
As of match played 15 November 2025

Appearances and goals by national team and year
National team	Year	Apps	Goals
Colombia	2021	4	0
Colombia	2022	4	0
Colombia	2023	4	0
Colombia	2024	9	0
Colombia	2025	3	0
Total		24	0

== Honours ==
Atlético Nacional

- Categoría Primera A: 2017-I
- Copa Colombia: 2018
- Copa Libertadores: 2016

Genk

- Belgian Cup: 2020–21

Galatasaray

- Süper Lig: 2024–25
- Turkish Cup: 2024–25
