= Joris Kayembe =

DR Congolese footballer

Personal information
- Full name: Joris Kayembe Ditu
- Date of birth: 8 August 1994 (age 32)
- Place of birth: Brussels, Belgium
- Height: 1.80 m (5 ft 11 in)
- Positions: Left-back; wing-back

Team information
- Current team: Genk
- Number: 18

Youth career
- 2010–2011: Brussels
- 2011–2013: Standard Liége

Senior career*
Years	Team	Apps	(Gls)
2013–2017	Porto B	73	(9)
2014–2017	Porto	1	(0)
2015	→ Arouca (loan)	15	(1)
2015–2016	→ Rio Ave (loan)	26	(2)
2017–2020	Nantes	3	(0)
2020–2023	Charleroi	111	(3)
2023–	Genk	102	(4)

International career^{‡}
2009–2010	Belgium U16	4	(0)
2014–2016	Belgium U21	9	(3)
2020	Belgium	2	(0)
2023–	DR Congo	31	(1)
- * Club domestic league appearances and goals as of 25 October 2026 ‡ National team caps and goals as of 28 September 2026

Joris Kayembe Ditu (born 8 August 1994) is a professional footballer who as a winger plays for Belgian Pro League club Genk. Born in Belgium and formerly a Belgium international in a pair of friendly matches, he plays for the DR Congo national team.

== Club career ==
=== Early career ===
Born in Brussels, Kayembe started his youth career in Belgium with RSD Jette then FC Brussels and Standard Liége.

=== Porto ===
In 2013, he signed for FC Porto. Along with some other players of the team, Kayembe was called to the first-team squad to face S.C. Olhanense. After a very good first season with the B squad he finally made his debut on 4 May 2014, coming as a 46th-minute substitute for Tozé.

==== Loan to Arouca ====
Kayembe started the 2014–15 season with Porto's first team but appeared mainly in B squad. In January 2015, he was loaned to F.C. Arouca.

==== Loan to Rio Ave ====
On 31 July 2015, Kayembe was loaned to fellow Primeira Liga team Rio Ave F.C.

=== Nantes ===
Under one of the terms of the contract allowing Sérgio Conceição to leave FC Nantes and join the Portuguese club bench, Joris Kayembe was transferred free of charge to FC Nantes on June 14, 2017.

Kayembe is suffering from injuries and fights very few games with the Canaries.

=== Charleroi ===
On January 17, 2020, he signed a two-year contract with Charleroi to revive himself.

In his first 5 months with the Zebras, Kayembe made some interesting appearances.

For the 2020-2021 season, yet left winger, Kayembe starts the championship as a left-back holder following the departure of Núrio Fortuna to Gent.

=== Genk ===
In May 2023, he left Charleroi for the Genk where he signed a contract for three years with an additional season as an option.

== International career ==
Kayembe was born in Belgium and is of Congolese descent. Kayembe debuted with the Belgium national football team in a 1–1 friendly draw with Ivory Coast on 8 October 2020. In 2023, Kayembe switched his international allegiance to the DR Congo.

On 27 December 2023, he was selected from the list of 24 Congolese players selected by Sébastien Desabre to compete in the 2023 Africa Cup of Nations.

On 19 May 2026, Kayembe was included in the 26-man squad selected by head coach Sébastien Desabre to represent the DR Congo at the 2026 FIFA World Cup.

== Career statistics ==
=== Club ===
As of match played 25 October 2026

Appearances and goals by club, season and competition
Club	Season	League			Cup		League Cup		Europe		Other		Total	
Club	Season	Division	Apps	Goals	Apps	Goals	Apps	Goals	Apps	Goals	Apps	Goals	Apps	Goals
Porto B	2013–14	Liga Portugal 2	26	2	—		—		—		—		26	2
Porto B	2014–15	Liga Portugal 2	18	1	—		—		—		—		18	1
Porto B	2016–17	Liga Portugal 2	28	6	—		—		—		—		28	6
Porto B	Total		72	9	0	0	0	0	0	0	0	0	72	9
Porto	2013–14	Primeira Liga	1	0	0	0	0	0	0	0	—		1	0
Arouca (loan)	2014–15	Primeira Liga	15	1	0	0	0	0	0	0	—		15	1
Rio Ave (loan)	2015–16	Primeira Liga	26	2	3	0	3	1	0	0	—		32	3
Nantes	2017–18	Ligue 1	3	0	0	0	0	0	0	0	—		3	0
Nantes II	2018–19	National 2	3	0	0	0	0	0	0	0	—		3	0
Charleroi	2019–20	Belgian Pro League	8	0	0	0	—		0	0	—		8	0
Charleroi	2020–21	Belgian Pro League	34	1	2	0	—		2 (Note: Appearances in UEFA Europa League)	0	—		38	1
Charleroi	2021–22	Belgian Pro League	39	2	0	0	—		—		—		39	2
Charleroi	2022–23	Belgian Pro League	30	1	1	0	—		—		—		31	1
Charleroi	Total		111	4	3	0	—		2	0	—		116	4
Genk	2023–24	Belgian Pro League	26	1	2	0	—		8 (Note: Two appearances in UEFA Champions League, two appearances in UEFA Europa League, four appearances and one goal in UEFA Conference League)	1	—		36	2
Genk	2024–25	Belgian Pro League	39	2	3	0	—		—		—		42	2
Genk	2025–26	Belgian Pro League	28	0	0	0	—		11	0	—		39	0
Genk	2026–27	Belgian Pro League	9	1	1	0	—		—		—		10	1
Genk	Total		102	4	6	0	—		19	1	—		127	5
Career total			333	20	12	0	3	1	21	1	1	0	369	22

=== International ===
As of match played 28 September 2026

Appearances and goals by national team and year
National team	Year	Apps	Goals
Belgium	2020	2	0
Belgium	Total	2	0
DR Congo	2023	3	0
DR Congo	2024	10	0
DR Congo	2025	9	0
DR Congo	2026	9	1
DR Congo	Total	31	1
Career total		33	1

Scores and results list DR Congo's goal tally first.

List of international goals scored by Joris Kayembe
No.	Date	Venue	Cap	Opponent	Score	Result	Competition
1.	9 June 2026	Stade de la Source, Orléans, France	26	Chile	1–2	1–2	Friendly

== See also ==
- List of association footballers who have been capped for two senior national teams
