= Daniel Muñoz (footballer) =

Colombian footballer (born 1996)

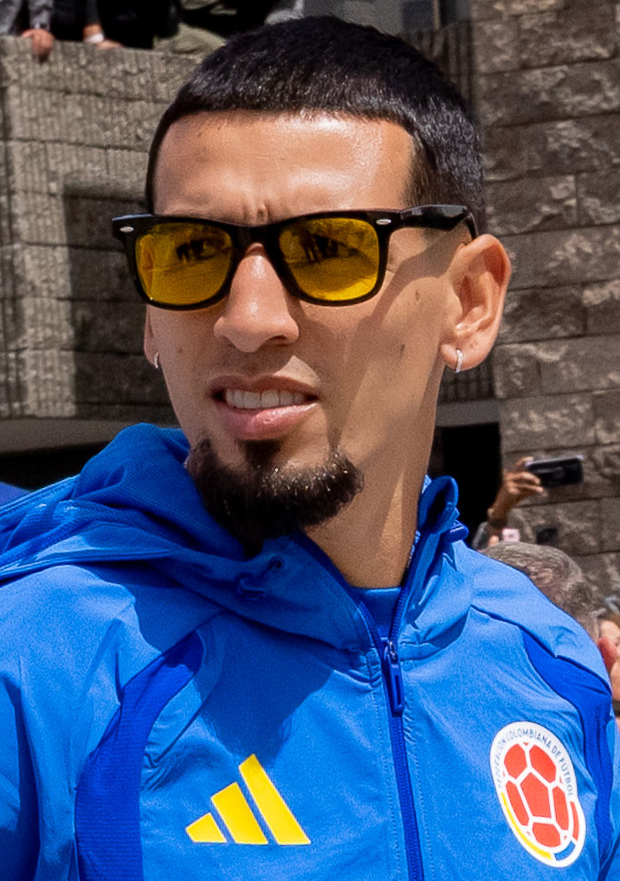
- Muñoz in 2026

Personal information
- Full name: Daniel Muñoz Mejía
- Date of birth: 26 May 1996 (age 30)
- Place of birth: Amalfi, Antioquia, Colombia
- Height: 1.80 m (5 ft 11 in)
- Positions: Right-back; right wing-back

Team information
- Current team: Nottingham Forest
- Number: 27

Youth career
- Envigado
- Total Soccer

Senior career*
Years	Team	Apps	(Gls)
2017–2019	Águilas Doradas	81	(3)
2019–2020	Atlético Nacional	27	(7)
2020–2024	Genk	122	(16)
2024–2026	Crystal Palace	83	(8)
2026–	Nottingham Forest	7	(0)

International career^{‡}
2021–	Colombia	53	(5)
Medal record
Representing Colombia
Copa América
Runner-up	2024 United States
Third place	2021 Brazil
- * Club domestic league appearances and goals as of 31 October 2026 ‡ National team caps and goals as of 6 October 2026

Daniel Muñoz Mejía (born 26 May 1996) is a Colombian professional footballer who plays as a right-back or right wing-back for Premier League club Nottingham Forest and the Colombia national team.

A former member of Atlético Nacional's organized supporters' group who was rejected by several clubs as a teenager, Muñoz made his professional debut with Águilas Doradas in 2017 and joined Nacional in 2019, where he became captain. He moved to Belgian club Genk in 2020, winning the Belgian Cup in his first season and finishing as league runner-up in 2021 and 2023. He joined Crystal Palace in January 2024 and, under Oliver Glasner, set up Eberechi Eze's winning goal in the 2025 FA Cup final, the club's first major trophy, and was named the club's player of the season. Palace went on to win the 2025 FA Community Shield and the 2025–26 UEFA Conference League, and in August 2026 he rejoined Glasner at Nottingham Forest in a deal worth up to £22 million.

Muñoz made his senior international debut for Colombia in 2021 and played in the team's third-place finish at the 2021 Copa América. He scored his first international goal in Colombia's first-ever win over Spain in March 2024, and scored twice at the 2024 Copa América, where Colombia reached the final, although a red card in the semi-final ruled him out of the defeat to Argentina. Muñoz represented Colombia at the 2026 FIFA World Cup.

== Early life ==
Muñoz was born on 26 May 1996 in Amalfi, in the department of Antioquia, and moved with his family to Bello, on the outskirts of Medellín, at the age of five. Raised by parents who supported Atlético Nacional, he joined the club's Los del Sur supporters' group as a teenager and followed the team from the terraces of the Estadio Atanasio Girardot while playing in the youth ranks of Envigado. He spent around two years abroad as a minor seeking a club in Mexico, Spain and Italy without earning a contract, and returned to Medellín in 2015; he later said he had been turned down by clubs including Atlante, Cruz Azul, Udinese, Rayo Majadahonda, Independiente Medellín, Atlético Huila and Deportes Tolima. At 18 he planned to move to the United States to work, but his visa application was refused, and he came close to giving up football. Instead he joined the amateur club Total Soccer, where coach Gabriel Sepúlveda converted him from a striker into a right-back. In July 2016, the day after Nacional won the 2016 Copa Libertadores, he received the call for a trial at Águilas Doradas, whose sporting director Juan Eugenio Jiménez had watched him in a regional league match and pushed for him to join the first-team squad rather than the under-20 side.

== Club career ==
=== Águilas Doradas ===
Muñoz made his professional debut for Águilas Doradas in the Categoría Primera A in 2017, at the age of 20. He became a regular at right-back, and in the second half of 2018 he was named in the DIMAYOR's team of the tournament after scoring three goals and leading the league in tackles and duels won.

=== Atlético Nacional ===
On 26 June 2019, Muñoz joined Atlético Nacional, the club he had supported since childhood. He made his debut on 13 July in a 2–1 win at Once Caldas, Juan Carlos Osorio's first match back in charge of the club, and scored his first goal for Nacional in a 4–1 win over Huila on 6 August. On 14 September 2019 he scored inside the first minute against Cúcuta Deportivo, the 5,000th league goal in Nacional's history, although Cúcuta came back to win 3–2. He later scored the only goal of a 1–0 win against his former club, and on 10 November scored the first brace of his career in a 3–1 win over Cúcuta in the opening round of the championship play-off groups. Having declined the captaincy in the second half of 2019, he accepted it at the start of 2020, succeeding Alexis Henríquez at the age of 23. As captain, he opened the scoring in a 3–0 home win over Huracán in the first round of the 2020 Copa Sudamericana in February 2020. On 28 May 2020, Nacional announced that it had agreed his sale to Genk, retaining around 15 per cent of his economic rights; club president Juan David Pérez cited the financial pressure caused by the COVID-19 pandemic.

=== Genk ===
Muñoz signed a four-year contract with Genk, with an option for a fifth, for a fee reported in the Belgian press as €4.5 million. He made his competitive debut on the opening day of the 2020–21 season, starting in a 2–1 win at Zulte Waregem on 9 August 2020, and he played in every league match that season, moving from midfield into central defence and then to right-back after Joakim Mæhle left the club. His first goal for Genk came on 4 March 2021, a header in a 4–1 win over Mechelen in the quarter-finals of the Belgian Cup. On 25 April he started at right-back in the final, in which Genk beat Standard Liège 2–1 at the King Baudouin Stadium, and a month later Genk finished the season as runners-up to Club Brugge.

Muñoz scored his first league goal for Genk with a stoppage-time winner in a 2–1 win at Kortrijk on 8 August 2021, and played in the UEFA Champions League qualifying rounds and the UEFA Europa League group stage that season. In October 2022 he scored his first brace for the club in a 6–1 win over Westerlo, and by March 2023 he had scored seven league goals as Genk led the table. The title was decided on the final day of the championship play-offs on 4 June 2023, when Muñoz started against Antwerp at Genk and Toby Alderweireld's stoppage-time equaliser in a 2–2 draw gave Antwerp the championship by one point over Genk. Genk were eliminated from Champions League qualifying on penalties by Servette in August 2023 and then from the Europa League play-offs by Olympiacos, before Muñoz scored the winner in a 2–1 first-leg victory over Adana Demirspor in the Europa Conference League play-off round on 24 August. He also scored an equaliser against Ferencváros in the group stage in November 2023.

=== Crystal Palace ===
On 30 January 2024, Muñoz joined Premier League club Crystal Palace for an undisclosed fee on a contract until 2027, with the option of a further year; he was the club's first senior signing of the January transfer window. He made his debut on 3 February, starting at right-back in a 4–1 defeat at Brighton & Hove Albion.

Muñoz became a regular at right wing-back under Oliver Glasner in 2024–25. He scored his first goal for Palace with a header in the fourth minute of stoppage time to earn a 1–1 draw with Newcastle United on 30 November 2024, a goal later voted the club's goal of the month. In February 2025 he scored the opening goal in a 2–0 FA Cup fourth-round win at Doncaster Rovers and finished a counter-attack in a 2–0 league win at Fulham, a goal nominated for the Premier League's goal of the month; he scored again in a 3–1 fifth-round win over Millwall on 1 March. On 5 April he scored the winning goal early in the second half of a 2–1 home win over Brighton, a match Palace finished with nine men. On 18 April he signed a new contract running until 2028; the club noted that his 106 tackles that season were the most by any Premier League defender.

Muñoz with Crystal Palace in 2025

In the 2025 FA Cup final at Wembley Stadium on 17 May 2025, Muñoz provided the low cross from the right that Eberechi Eze converted for the only goal of a 1–0 win over Manchester City, giving Palace the first major trophy in their history, and he received the official player of the match award. At the end of the season he was voted Palace's player of the season by both supporters and his teammates, and was named at right-back in the Premier League's fan-voted Team of the Season.

Muñoz played the full match in the 2025 FA Community Shield on 10 August 2025, in which Palace drew 2–2 with Liverpool and won 3–2 on penalties. On 2 October he headed the opening goal from a Yeremy Pino cross in a 2–0 win over Dynamo Kyiv, Palace's first match in the league phase of the UEFA Conference League, and on 22 November he opened the scoring in a 2–0 league win at Wolverhampton Wanderers. A knee injury sustained in training in December required surgery and kept him out for around seven weeks. He returned to help Palace reach the Conference League final, and on 27 May 2026 he started as they beat Rayo Vallecano 1–0 in Leipzig through a Jean-Philippe Mateta goal to win the competition.

Glasner left Palace at the end of the season, and Muñoz started the opening match of the 2026–27 season under his successor, Pierre Sage, a 2–0 defeat at Everton on 22 August 2026.

=== Nottingham Forest ===
On 31 August 2026, Muñoz joined Nottingham Forest on a three-year contract, with the option of a fourth, in a deal worth up to £22 million; the move reunited him with Glasner, who had been appointed Forest's head coach on 6 July. He made his debut on 5 September as a second-half substitute in a goalless draw with Tottenham Hotspur, wearing a protective mask following nose surgery after the World Cup.

== International career ==
Carlos Queiroz first called Muñoz up to the Colombia squad in August 2019, for friendlies against Brazil and Venezuela in the United States, but he withdrew with a hamstring injury. He was named in a preliminary squad for World Cup qualifiers in March 2020. He made his debut on 3 June 2021 in a World Cup qualifier away to Peru, coming on for Stefan Medina in the second half of a 3–0 win and being sent off within a minute, after a video review upgraded a yellow card for a foul to a red. Later that month he was selected by Reinaldo Rueda for the 2021 Copa América in Brazil, where he played five matches, including the semi-final defeat on penalties to Argentina in a midfield role, as Colombia finished third.

Under Néstor Lorenzo, who took charge in 2022, Muñoz became a fixture at right-back, playing in 35 of the 48 matches of Lorenzo's first cycle. He scored his first international goal on 22 March 2024, volleying in a cross from Luis Díaz in the 61st minute of a 1–0 friendly win over Spain at the London Stadium, Colombia's first victory over Spain.

On 14 June 2024, Muñoz was named in Colombia's 26-man squad for the 2024 Copa América in the United States. He headed in a James Rodríguez cross for the opening goal of a 2–1 win over Paraguay in Houston on 24 June, and on 2 July he equalised in first-half stoppage time in a 1–1 draw with Brazil in Santa Clara that sealed first place in the group. In the semi-final against Uruguay in Charlotte on 10 July, he was sent off for a second yellow card at the end of the first half, after catching Manuel Ugarte with his elbow; Colombia held on to win 1–0, but his suspension ruled him out of the final, which Argentina won 1–0 after extra time.

On 25 May 2026, Muñoz was named in the 26-man squad for the 2026 FIFA World Cup. He scored the opening goal in the 40th minute of Colombia's first match, a 3–1 win over Uzbekistan at the Estadio Azteca on 17 June. On 23 June in Guadalajara he scored the only goal against DR Congo in the 76th minute, from a pass by Juan Fernando Quintero, securing Colombia's place in the knockout stage, and he was named player of the match. Lorenzo left him out of the starting line-up for the final group match, a goalless draw with Portugal that confirmed Colombia as group winners. Colombia beat Ghana 1–0 in the round of 32 before being eliminated by Switzerland on penalties after a goalless draw in the round of 16 in Vancouver on 7 July, a match Muñoz played.

== Style of play ==
Muñoz is a right-back who is equally suited to playing as a wing-back; Glasner described him as "a mix between a right-back and a right winger", noting his instinct for arriving at the far post. Over his career he has also been used on the left flank, in defensive and attacking midfield, on the wing and as a false nine. His game is built on running volume and intensity: in 2024–25 he covered more high-intensity distance per match than any other Premier League player, made 203 off-the-ball runs into the penalty area, 59 more than any other full-back or wing-back, and averaged 3.5 tackles per 90 minutes. He times his late runs into the box to finish or to play cut-backs, and in February 2026 an analysis of Premier League players by Gradient Sports for ESPN rated him the most athletic player in the league, combining speed, endurance and acceleration.

== Career statistics ==
=== Club ===
As of match played 31 October 2026

Appearances and goals by club, season and competition
Club	Season	League			National cup (Note: Includes Copa Colombia, Belgian Cup, FA Cup)		League cup (Note: Includes EFL Cup)		Continental		Other		Total	
Club	Season	Division	Apps	Goals	Apps	Goals	Apps	Goals	Apps	Goals	Apps	Goals	Apps	Goals
Águilas Doradas	2017	Liga DIMAYOR	30	0	5	0	—		2 (Note: Appearances in Copa Sudamericana)	0	—		37	0
Águilas Doradas	2018	Liga DIMAYOR	32	3	2	0	—		—		—		34	3
Águilas Doradas	2019	Liga DIMAYOR	19	0	0	0	—		4	0	—		23	0
Águilas Doradas	Total		81	3	7	0	—		6	0	—		94	3
Atlético Nacional	2019	Liga DIMAYOR	21	7	4	0	—		—		—		25	7
Atlético Nacional	2020	Liga DIMAYOR	6	0	0	0	—		2	1	—		8	1
Atlético Nacional	Total		27	7	4	0	—		2	1	—		33	8
Genk	2020–21	Belgian Pro League	40	0	4	1	—		—		—		44	1
Genk	2021–22	Belgian Pro League	29	3	2	0	—		5 (Note: Two appearances in UEFA Champions League, three appearances in UEFA Europa League)	0	0	0	36	3
Genk	2022–23	Belgian Pro League	36	8	3	0	—		—		—		39	8
Genk	2023–24	Belgian Pro League	17	5	1	0	—		11 (Note: Two appearances in UEFA Champions League, two appearances in UEFA Europa League, seven appearances and two goals in UEFA Europa Conference League)	2	—		29	7
Genk	Total		122	16	10	1	—		16	2	0	0	148	19
Crystal Palace	2023–24	Premier League	16	0	—		—		—		—		16	0
Crystal Palace	2024–25	Premier League	37	4	6	2	3	0	—		—		46	6
Crystal Palace	2025–26	Premier League	29	4	0	0	2	0	14 (Note: Appearances in UEFA Conference League)	1	1 (Note: Appearance in FA Community Shield)	0	46	5
Crystal Palace	2026–27	Premier League	1	0	—		0	0	—		—		1	0
Crystal Palace	Total		83	8	6	2	5	0	14	1	1	0	109	11
Nottingham Forest	2026–27	Premier League	7	0	0	0	—		—		—		7	0
Career total			320	34	27	3	5	0	38	4	1	0	391	41

=== International ===
As of match played 6 October 2026

Appearances and goals by national team and year
National team	Year	Apps	Goals
Colombia	2021	10	0
Colombia	2022	5	0
Colombia	2023	8	0
Colombia	2024	13	3
Colombia	2025	6	0
Colombia	2026	11	2
Total		53	5

Scores and results list Colombia's goal tally first.

List of international goals scored by Daniel Muñoz
No.	Date	Venue	Cap	Opponent	Score	Result	Competition
1	22 March 2024	London Stadium, London, England	24	Spain	1–0	1–0	Friendly
2	24 June 2024	NRG Stadium, Houston, United States	28	Paraguay	1–0	2–1	2024 Copa América
3	2 July 2024	Levi's Stadium, Santa Clara, United States	30	Brazil	1–1	1–1	2024 Copa América
4	17 June 2026	Estadio Azteca, Mexico City, Mexico	47	Uzbekistan	1–0	3–1	2026 FIFA World Cup
5	23 June 2026	Estadio Akron, Guadalajara, Mexico	48	DR Congo	1–0	1–0	2026 FIFA World Cup

== Honours ==
Genk

- Belgian Cup: 2020–21

Crystal Palace

- FA Cup: 2024–25
- FA Community Shield: 2025
- UEFA Conference League: 2025–26

Colombia

- Copa América runner-up: 2024
- Copa América third place: 2021

Individual

- Categoría Primera A Team of the Tournament: 2018 Finalización
- IFFHS Copa América Top 11: 2024
- FA Cup final Player of the Match: 2025
- Crystal Palace Player of the Season: 2024–25
- Crystal Palace Players' Player of the Season: 2024–25
- Premier League Fan Team of the Season: 2024–25
