= Hendrik Van Crombrugge =

Belgian footballer (born 1993)

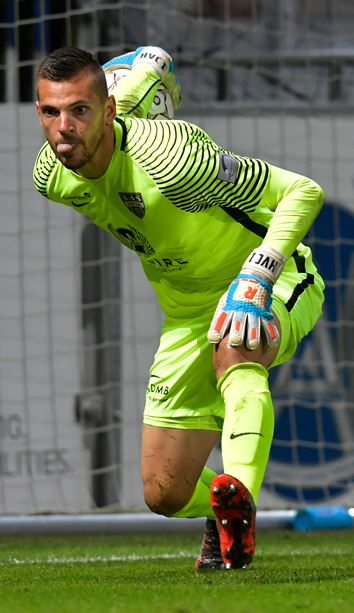
- Van Crombrugge with Eupen in 2017

Personal information
- Date of birth: 30 April 1993 (age 33)
- Place of birth: Leuven, Belgium
- Height: 1.88 m (6 ft 2 in)
- Position: Goalkeeper

Team information
- Current team: Genk
- Number: 1

Youth career
- 1999–2003: FC Meensel-Kiezegem
- 2003–2004: VV Houtem
- 2004–2005: Tienen
- 2005–2008: Sint-Truiden
- 2008–2011: Standard Liège

Senior career*
Years	Team	Apps	(Gls)
2009–2011	Standard Liège	0	(0)
2011–2013	Sint-Truiden	1	(0)
2013–2019	Eupen	178	(0)
2019–2023	Anderlecht	96	(0)
2023–	Genk	31	(0)

International career^{‡}
2008	Belgium U15	3	(0)
2008	Belgium U16	1	(0)
2010	Belgium U17	3	(0)
2010–2011	Belgium U18	4	(0)
2020	Belgium	1	(0)
- * Club domestic league appearances and goals as of 26 December 2025 ‡ National team caps and goals as of 8 October 2020

Hendrik Van Crombrugge (born 30 April 1993) is a Belgian professional footballer who plays as a goalkeeper for Belgian Pro League club Genk and the Belgium national team.

== Club career ==
Hendrik Van Crombrugge started his career with Standard de Liège. On 1 August 2019 it was announced that Van Crombrugge had signed a four-year contract at Anderlecht.

== International career ==
Van Crombrugge earned his first full international call-up when Roberto Martínez named him in the Belgium squad in September 2019. Van Crombrugge debuted with Belgium in a 1–1 friendly draw with Ivory Coast on 8 October 2020.

== Career statistics ==
=== Club ===
As of match played 26 December 2025

Appearances and goals by club, season and competition
Club	Season	League			Cup		Continental		Other		Total	
Club	Season	Division	Apps	Goals	Apps	Goals	Apps	Goals	Apps	Goals	Apps	Goals
Sint-Truiden	2011–12	Belgian Pro League	1	0	0	0	—		—		1	0
Sint-Truiden	2012–13	Belgian Pro League	0	0	0	0	—		—		0	0
Sint-Truiden	Total		1	0	0	0	—		—		1	0
Eupen	2013–14	Proximus League	11	0	1	0	—		—		12	0
Eupen	2014–15	Proximus League	40	0	1	0	—		—		41	0
Eupen	2015–16	Proximus League	19	0	1	0	—		—		20	0
Eupen	2016–17	Belgian Pro League	35	0	0	0	—		—		35	0
Eupen	2017–18	Belgian Pro League	33	0	0	0	—		—		33	0
Eupen	2018–19	Belgian Pro League	37	0	0	0	—		—		37	0
Eupen	2019–20	Belgian Pro League	1	0	—		—		—		1	0
Eupen	Total		176	0	3	0	—		—		179	0
Anderlecht	2019–20	Belgian Pro League	28	0	3	0	—		—		31	0
Anderlecht	2020–21	Belgian Pro League	12	0	0	0	—		—		12	0
Anderlecht	2021–22	Belgian Pro League	39	0	6	0	4 (Note: Appearances in UEFA Europa Conference League)	0	—		49	0
Anderlecht	2022–23	Belgian Pro League	17	0	1	0	10	0	—		28	0
Anderlecht	Total		96	0	10	0	14	0	—		120	0
Genk	2023–24	Belgian Pro League	0	0	1	0	2	0	—		3	0
Genk	2024–25	Belgian Pro League	19	0	0	0	—		—		19	0
Genk	2025–26	Belgian Pro League	12	0	2	0	6 (Note: Appearances in UEFA Europa League)	0	—		20	0
Genk	Total		31	0	3	0	8	0	0	0	42	0
Career total			304	0	16	0	22	0	0	0	342	0

=== International ===
As of match played 8 October 2020

Appearances and goals by national team and year
National team	Year	Apps	Goals
Belgium	2020	1	0
Total		1	0
