= João Vitor (footballer, born 2005) =

Brazilian footballer

Personal information
- Full name: João Vitor Fonseca da Silva
- Date of birth: 29 May 2005 (age 21)
- Place of birth: Brazil
- Height: 1.70 m (5 ft 7 in)
- Positions: Right-back; left-back; winger

Team information
- Current team: Vasco da Gama
- Number: 60

Youth career
- 2021–2026: Nova Iguaçu
- 2023–2026: → Vasco da Gama (loan)

Senior career*
Years	Team	Apps	(Gls)
2026	Nova Iguaçu	0	(0)
2026	→ Vasco da Gama (loan)	2	(0)
2026–	Vasco da Gama	0	(0)
- * Club domestic league appearances and goals as of 00:11, 10 February 2026 (UTC)

João Vitor Fonseca da Silva (born 29 May 2005), known as Mutano or João Vitor, is a Brazilian footballer who plays as either a wing-back or a winger for Vasco da Gama.

== Career ==
João Vitor began his career with Nova Iguaçu, and was loaned to Vasco da Gama on 14 October 2023. On 26 December 2025, his loan was extended until the following June.

João Vitor made his senior debut on 18 January 2026, coming on as a late substitute for Victor Luis in a 0–0 Campeonato Carioca home draw against his former side Nova Iguaçu. Eight days later, after another first team appearance, he signed a permanent deal with Vasco, with Nova Iguaçu retaining 50% of his economic rights.

== Career statistics ==
As of 9 February 2026

Club	Season	League			State League		Cup		Continental		Other		Total	
Club	Season	Division	Apps	Goals	Apps	Goals	Apps	Goals	Apps	Goals	Apps	Goals	Apps	Goals
Vasco da Gama	2026	Série A	2	0	2	0	0	0	0	0	—		4	0
Career total			2	0	2	0	0	0	0	0	0	0	4	0
