= Cauan Barros =

Brazilian footballer (born 2004)

Personal information
- Full name: Cauan Lucas Barros da Luz
- Date of birth: 6 May 2004 (age 22)
- Place of birth: Petrolândia, Brazil
- Height: 1.83 m (6 ft 0 in)
- Position: Midfielder

Team information
- Current team: Vasco da Gama
- Number: 88

Youth career
- Primavera
- 2019–2023: Vasco da Gama

Senior career*
Years	Team	Apps	(Gls)
2023–	Vasco da Gama	50	(4)
2024	→ Amazonas (loan)	24	(2)
2025	→ América Mineiro (loan)	27	(5)
- * Club domestic league appearances and goals as of 8 April 2026

Cauan Lucas Barros da Luz (born 6 May 2004), known as Cauan Barros, is a Brazilian footballer who plays as a midfielder for Vasco da Gama.

== Club career ==
Cauan Barros began his career with Primavera in São Paulo, before his performances at the São Paulo championships attracted the attention of Vasco da Gama, and he went on to join Vasco da Gama in 2019. He signed his first professional contract in 2021.

== Personal life ==
Barros is of Indigenous Pankararu descent.

== Career statistics ==
=== Club ===
As of 5 March 2023.

Appearances and goals by club, season and competition
Club	Season	League			State League		Cup		Continental		Other		Total	
Club	Season	Division	Apps	Goals	Apps	Goals	Apps	Goals	Apps	Goals	Apps	Goals	Apps	Goals
Vasco da Gama	2023	Série A	0	0	6 (Note: Appearances in the Campeonato Carioca)	0	0	0	—		0	0	6	0
Career total			0	0	6	0	0	0	0	0	0	0	6	0
