= Alan Saldivia =

Uruguayan footballer (born 2002)

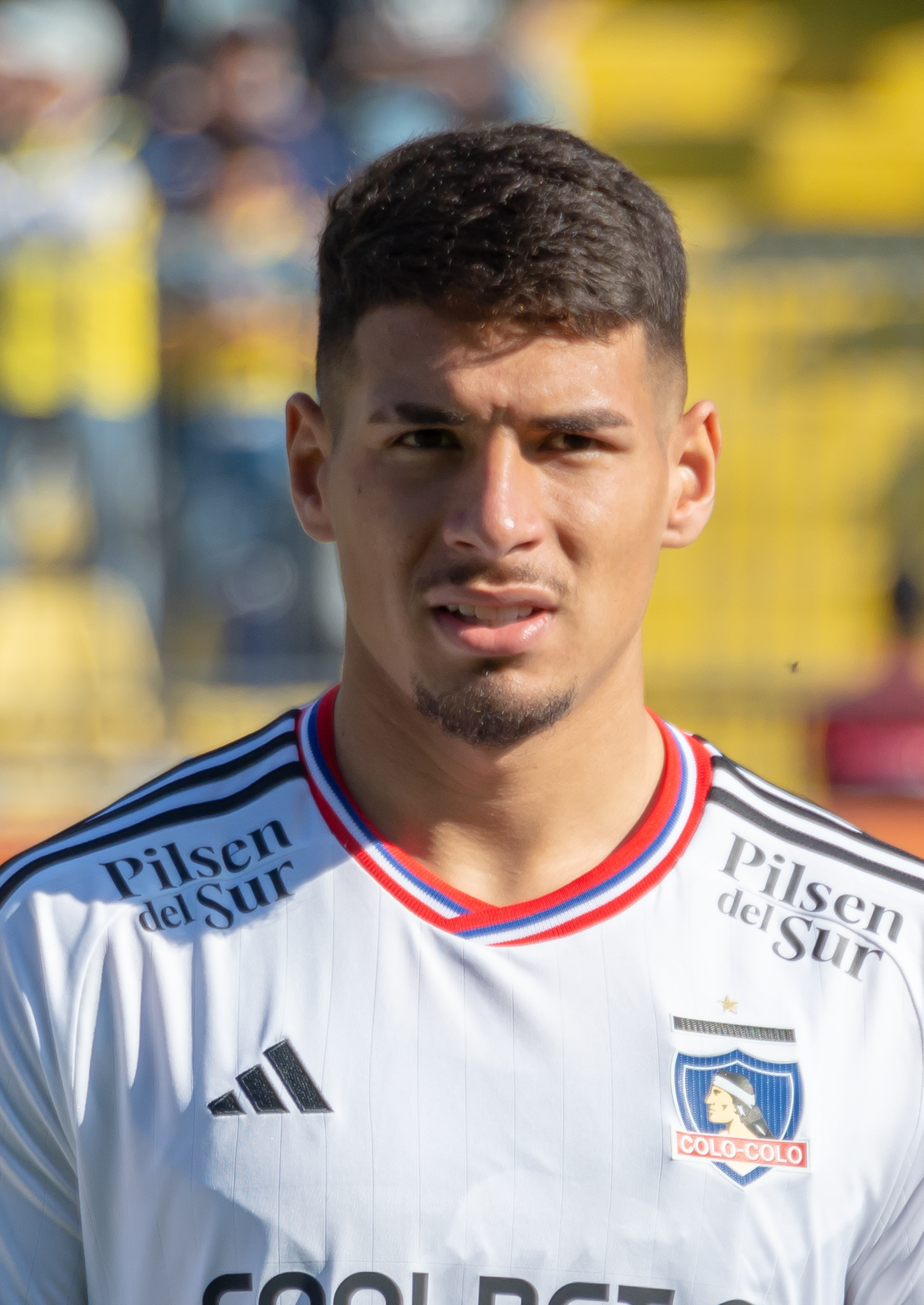
- Saldivia with Colo-Colo in 2023

Personal information
- Full name: Alan Gabriel Saldivia Vázquez
- Date of birth: 6 April 2002 (age 24)
- Place of birth: Rivera, Uruguay
- Height: 1.80 m (5 ft 11 in)
- Position: Centre-back

Team information
- Current team: Vasco da Gama
- Number: 4

Youth career
- Defensor Sporting
- 2021: Montevideo City Torque
- 2021: → Colo-Colo (loan)
- 2022: Colo-Colo

Senior career*
Years	Team	Apps	(Gls)
2023–2025	Colo-Colo	54	(0)
2026–	Vasco da Gama	13	(0)

International career
2023	Uruguay U23	4	(0)
- * Club domestic league appearances and goals as of 8 April 2026

Alan Gabriel Saldivia Vázquez (born 6 April 2002) is a Uruguayan professional footballer who plays as a centre-back for Campeonato Brasileiro Série A club Vasco da Gama.

== Early life ==
Saldivia was born in 2002 in Rivera, Uruguay.

== Youth career ==
As a youth player, Saldivia joined the youth academy of Uruguayan side Montevideo City Torque. In 2021, Saldivia joined the youth academy of Chilean top flight side Colo-Colo, where he was regarded as a leader.

== Senior career ==
Saldivia started his senior career with Chilean side Colo-Colo. On 9 April 2023, he debuted for Colo-Colo against Santiago City. In 2023, he renewed his contract with the club to 2026.

During the current 2025 campaign, he has featured in the starting XI for 19 of his side's 30 fixtures. His composure on the pitch has been evident, as he has been booked just three times, showcasing remarkable discipline for a regular starter.

On 13 January 2026, Saldivia signed a three-year contract with Brazilian club Vasco da Gama.

== Style of play ==
Saldivia mainly operates as a central defender.

== Honours ==
Colo-Colo

- Chilean Primera División (1): 2024
- Copa Chile (1): 2023
- Supercopa de Chile (1): 2024

Individual

- Chilean Primera División Ideal Team: 2024
