= Marquinhos (footballer, born 2007) =

Brazilian footballer (born 2007)

Personal information
- Full name: Marcos Felipe Vinagre Souza
- Date of birth: 15 February 2007 (age 19)
- Place of birth: Brazil
- Height: 1.85 m (6 ft 1 in)
- Position: Centre-back

Team information
- Current team: Botafogo
- Number: 64

Youth career
- –2024: Vasco da Gama
- 2024–: Botafogo

Senior career*
| Years | Team | Apps | (Gls) |
| 2025– | Botafogo | 1 | (0) |
- * Club domestic league appearances and goals as of 22:47, 7 November 2025 (UTC)

Marcos Felipe Vinagre Souza (born 15 February 2007), commonly known as Marquinhos, is a Brazilian footballer who plays as a centre-back for Botafogo.

== Career ==
Marquinhos joined Botafogo's youth setup in July 2024, after being rarely used in the under-17 squad of Vasco da Gama. In October 2025, after being a regular starter for the club's under-20 team, he saw his release clause being increased to R$ 700 million.

Marquinhos made his first team – and Série A – debut on 1 November 2025, coming on as a late substitute for Newton in a 0–0 away draw against Mirassol.

== International career ==
In September 2025, Marquinhos joined the squad of the Brazil national team to complete a period of trainings.

== Career statistics ==
As of 7 November 2025

| Club | Season | League | | | Cup | | Continental | | Other | | Total | |
| Club | Season | Division | Apps | Goals | Apps | Goals | Apps | Goals | Apps | Goals | Apps | Goals |
|---|---|---|---|---|---|---|---|---|---|---|---|---|
| Botafogo | 2025 | Série A | 1 | 0 | 0 | 0 | — | | — | | 1 | 0 |
| Career total | | | 1 | 0 | 0 | 0 | 0 | 0 | 0 | 0 | 1 | 0 |
