= Matías Galarza (Argentine footballer) =

Argentine footballer

Personal information
- Full name: Matías Alejandro Galarza
- Date of birth: 4 March 2002 (age 24)
- Place of birth: San Isidro, Buenos Aires
- Height: 1.80 m (5 ft 11 in)
- Position: Midfielder

Team information
- Current team: Talleres
- Number: 5

Senior career*
Years	Team	Apps	(Gls)
2021–2022	Argentinos Juniors	24	(1)
2022–2024	Genk	41	(1)
2024–	Talleres	68	(1)
- * Club domestic league appearances and goals as of 17:36, 15 November 2026 (UTC)

Matías Alejandro Galarza (born 4 March 2002) is an Argentine professional footballer who plays for Talleres.

== Career ==
Galarza made his debut in the Argentine Primera División on 11 December 2021 appearing as a first half substitute for Argentinos Juniors against Club Atlético Sarmiento in a 2–0 home victory for his side. He was involved in both goals and was credited with the assist for the second, scored by Gabriel Ávalos. He would go on to appear fifteen times for Argentinos Juniors in his debut season, playing in central midfield. He scored his first senior goal against Newells Old Boys on 16 February 2022 in a 3–0 home victory for his side. Former Arsenal FC and France international Robert Pires compared him in style to Juan Roman Riquelme “because of the way he runs and handles the ball. He has good technique.”

In August, 2022 Galarza signed for K.R.C. Genk from Argentinos Juniors for a reported fee of €6million, agreeing to a contract lasting four seasons. Following his league debut for Genk against Zulte Waregem on 14 August 2022 Galarza spoke to the media and said he chose to join Genk because it was the former club of his football idol Kevin De Bruyne.

In August 2024 Galarza signed for Talleres from K.R.C. Genk for a fee of €3million, on a two-year contract.
