= List of foreign Liga MX players =

This is a list of foreign players in Liga MX during the professional era which began in 1943. The following players:

1. have played at least one Primera División game for the respective club;
2. have not been capped for the Mexico national team at any level; or
3. have been born in Mexico and were capped by a foreign national team. This includes players who have dual citizenship with Mexico.

Players are sorted by the State:

1. they played for in a national team at any level. For footballers that played for two or more national teams, they are listed with:
  1. the one he played for at A level;
  2. the national team representing his state of birth; or
2. If they never played for any national team at any level, the state of birth. For footballers born in **dissolved states**, they are listed in the state which now represents their place of birth (e.g.,: Yugoslavia -> Serbia, Montenegro, Croatia, etc...).

Stateless people are marked with an asterisk.

In bold: players that played at least one Primera División game in the current season.

Clubs are not allowed to play more than five foreign players in a Liga MX match. In March 2011, PRI lawmakers introduced a proposal to reduce the limit to three foreign players. FMF President Justino Compeán did not support the failed proposal because he believed it would not improve the quality of Mexican football players.

As of 1 January 2009, Club América had employed the most foreign players of any club in the history of the Primera División, with more than 150 in the professional era. A total of 88 foreign players participated in the 2012 Apertura tournament, 29 originating from Argentina and 14 from Colombia.

== Africa (CAF) ==
=== Algeria ===
- Andy Delort – Tigres – 2016–17

=== Cameroon ===
- **Frank Boya** – Tijuana – 2025–
- Achille Emaná – Cruz Azul, Atlante – 2013–14, 2014-15
- David Embé – Tecos – 1996–98
- Simon Moukoko – Tecos – 1997
- Alain Nkong – Atlante, Indios – 2007, 2009–10
- François Omam-Biyik – América, Yucatán FC, Puebla – 1994–96, 1997, 1999
- Jean Claude Pagal – América – 1995
- Patrick Soko – Atlas – 2017–18
- Joseph Tchango – Tecos – 1997/2001

=== Cape Verde ===
- Alessio da Cruz – Santos Laguna – 2021
- Djaniny – Santos Laguna – 2014–18
- **Duk** – Atlas – 2026–
- Valdo – Atlante – 2012–13

=== Gambia (The Gambia) ===
- Kekuta Manneh – Pachuca – 2018

=== Ghana ===
- Clifford Aboagye – Atlas, Querétaro, Tijuana, Puebla – 2017–19, 2019–20/2022–23, 2020, 2021
- Isaac Ayipei – Leones Negros, León, Veracruz – 1991–92, 1992–95, 1995–96

=== Ivory Coast ===
- Franck Boli – San Luis – 2024
- Aké Arnaud Loba – Querétaro, Monterrey, Mazatlán, Tijuana – 2019/2024, 2020–21, 2023, 2024

=== Morocco ===
- Mohammed Abderrazack – Puebla – 1951–52
- **Mourad El Ghezouani** – Tijuana – 2025–
- **Oussama Idrissi** – Pachuca – 2023–
- **Ryan Mmaee** – Atlas – 2026–

=== Nigeria ===
- Saminu Abdullahi – Juárez – 2025
- **Christian Ebere** – Cruz Azul – 2026–
- Alex Owhofasa – Atlante – 1995–96

=== São Tomé and Príncipe ===
- Luís Leal – Jaguares, Tijuana – 2017, 2020

=== Senegal ===
- **Jean Unjanque** – Querétaro – 2026–

=== Sierra Leone ===
- Abdul Thompson Conteh – Monterrey – 1999

=== Zambia ===
- Kalusha Bwalya – América, Necaxa, León – 1994–97, 1997, 1998

== Asia (AFC) ==
=== Japan ===
- Keisuke Honda – Pachuca – 2017–18

=== Lebanon ===
- **Pedro Budib** – Pachuca – 2026–
- Daniel Lajud – Monterrey, Querétaro, Puebla – 2018, 2019, 2019

=== Palestine ===
- Carlos Salom – Puebla – 2017

== Europe (UEFA) ==
=== Armenia ===
- Lucas Zelarayán – Tigres – 2016–20

=== Austria ===
- Alexander Bandl – Atlante – 1968–69
- Peter Aust – Toluca – 1969–70

=== Belgium ===
- **Hugo Cuypers** – Monterrey – 2026–

=== Bosnia-Herzegovina (Bosnia and Herzegovina) ===
- Davor Jozić – América – 1994
- Sead Seferović – Tigres – 1995–96
- Alen Škoro – Gallos Blancos – 2010

=== Bulgaria ===
- Emil Kostadinov – Tigres – 1997

=== Croatia ===
- Elvis Brajković – Santos Laguna, Atlante – 1999, 2000
- Darko Vukic – Toluca, Celaya – 1998–99, 2000
- Dario Brezak – Atlante, FC Inter Playa Del Carmen – 2012–2013, 2014

=== Czech Republic ===
- Josef Jelínek – Torreón – 1973–74

=== England ===
- Antonio Pedroza – Jaguares, Morelia, Cruz Azul, Toluca – 2010–11, 2012–13, 2015, 2016–17

=== France ===
- Julien Célestine – León – 2022
- André-Pierre Gignac – Tigres – 2015–26
- Timothée Kolodziejczak – Tigres – 2017–18
- Anthony Martial – Monterrey – 2025–26
- Jérémy Ménez – América – 2018–19
- Allan Saint-Maximin – América – 2025–26
- **Sébastien Salles-Lamonge** – San Luis – 2023–
- Amara Simba – León – 1997
- Florian Thauvin – Tigres – 2021–22

=== Germany ===
- Dieter Bedürftig – Necaxa – 1967–69
- Rice Desker – Necaxa – 1967–69
- Maurizio Gaudino – América – 1995–96
- Mateo Klimowicz – San Luis – 2023–25
- Peter Nover – Atlas – 1980–81
- Bernd Schuster – Pumas – 1997
- Uwe Wolf – Necaxa, Puebla – 1995–96, 1996–97

=== Greece ===
- Giorgos Giakoumakis – Cruz Azul – 2024–25

=== Hungary ===
- Janos Adam – América – 1948–49
- Iván Czintalán – América – 1948–49
- István Feckse – Oro – 1958–59
- István Kádas – América, Zacapetec – 1948–49, 1952-54
- György Marik – Irapuato, León, Atlas – 1954–55, 1956–57, 1957–59

=== Italy ===
- Cristian Battocchio – Pumas – 2021–22
- Mierko Blazina – Oro – 1957–58
- Mauro Camoranesi – Santos Laguna, Cruz Azul – 1995–96, 1998–00
- Carmelo D'Anzi – Cruz Azul – 1980–81
- Francesco Gallina – Atlante – 1971–74
- **João Pedro** – San Luis – 2025–
- Marco Rossi – América – 1995–96
- Pietro Maiellaro – Tigres – 1995–96
- Cristiano Piccini – San Luis – 2024–25

=== Lithuania ===
- Edward Virba – Necaxa – 1963–65

=== Montenegro ===
- Dejan Batrović – León – 1997
- **Uroš Đurđević** – Atlas, Monterrey – 2024–26, 2026–
- Dejan Peković – Puebla – 1998
- Andrija Vukčević – Juárez – 2023–24

=== Netherlands ===
- Javairô Dilrosun – América – 2024–25
- Gerard Hylkema – Atlante – 1973–74
- Vincent Janssen – Monterrey – 2019–22
- Hans Liotard – Puebla – 1974–75
- Theo van der Heyden – Atlas – 1974–75
- Romeo Wouden – Veracruz – 1998

=== North Macedonia ===
- Sašo Miloševski – Veracruz – 1998
- Viktor Trenevski – Puebla – 1998

=== Poland ===
- Jan Banaś – Atlético Español – 1975–76
- Mateusz Bogusz – Cruz Azul – 2025
- Jan Gomola – Atlético Español, Zacatepec – 1974/1976–77, 1974–76
- Grzegorz Lato – Atlante – 1982–84

=== Portugal ===
- William Carvalho – Pachuca – 2025
- **Luís Esteves** – Atlas – 2026–
- Eusébio – Monterrey – 1975–76
- **Paulinho** – Toluca – 2024–
- **Ricardinho** – Juárez – 2025–
- Tiago Gouveia - Atlas - 2026

=== Romania ===
- Miodrag Belodedici – Atlante – 1996–98
- Ilie Dumitrescu – América, Atlante – 1997, 1997–98

=== Russia ===
- Viktor Derbunov – Atlas – 1992–93

=== Scotland ===
- Jimmy Hickie – Asturias – 1946-47
- Tom McKillop – Asturias – 1946–47
- Jackie Milne – Asturias – 1946-47
- Ronnie Sharp – San Luis – 1973–74

=== Serbia ===
- Miroslav Čermelj – Pumas – 1997–98
- Branko Davidović – Tiburones Rojos de Veracruz – 1989–90
- Zoran Djurić – Monterrey – 1997–98
- Miroslav Draganić – Tampico – 1980–82
- Aleksandar Janjić – Puebla – 1998
- Mile Knežević – Puebla – 1998
- Goran Milojević – América – 1997
- Bora Milutinović – Pumas – 1972–77
- Zdenko Muf – Tecos, León – 1997-01/2002, 2001
- Saban Romanovic – Veracruz – 1972–74
- Vlada Stošić – Atlante – 1997
- Vojimir Sinđic – Puebla – 1998–99

=== Slovakia ===
- David Depetris – Morelia – 2014–15

=== Slovenia ===
- Andrés Vombergar – San Luis – 2021–22

=== Spain ===
- Abraham – Pumas, Lobos BUAP, Veracruz – 2016–18, 2018–19, 2019
- Mario Abrante – San Luis – 2019–20
- **Carlo Adriano** – Querétaro – 2025–
- Serafín Aedo – España – 1943–49
- **Carlos Álvarez** – América – 2026–
- Raúl Amarilla – América – 1989–90
- Alejandro Arribas – Pumas, Juárez – 2018–19, 2022–23
- Juan Manuel Asensi – Puebla, Oaxtepec – 1980–82, 1982–83
- Manuel Alonso – América 1945–1946
- José Mari Bakero – Veracruz – 1997
- Borja Bastón – Pachuca – 2024
- **Iker Benito** – Querétaro – 2026–
- Saúl Berjón – Pumas – 2016
- **Unai Bilbao** – San Luis, Necaxa, Tijuana – 2019–20/2021–24, 2020–21, 2024–
- Gregorio Blasco – España, Atlante – 1943–46, 1946–47
- José Buendía – América – 1953–61
- Emilio Butragueño – Celaya – 1995–98
- Cadete – Querétaro, San Luis – 2019–20, 2020
- Sergio Canales – Monterrey – 2023–26
- Leonardo Cilaurren – España – 1943–45
- Marc Crosas – Santos Laguna, Leones Negros, Cruz Azul – 2012–14, 2014–15, 2015
- Paulino de la Fuente – Pachuca – 2022–23
- José Miguel Díez Balerdi – Veracruz – 1943–44
- **Rubén Duarte** – Pumas – 2024–
- Aitor García – Juárez – 2023–24
- Fernando García – España, Marte – 1948–49, 1950–51
- Pol García – Juárez – 2021
- Luis García Fernández – Tigres – 2012–13
- Luis García Sanz – Puebla, Pumas – 2011–12, 2012–2013
- Ian González – San Luis, Necaxa, Toluca – 2019–20, 2020–21, 2021–22
- Ricardo González Bango – Celaya – 2001–02
- Pep Guardiola – Dorados – 2006
- Francisco Higuera – Puebla – 1997
- Santiago Idígoras – Puebla – 1981–82
- José Iraragorri – España – 1943–46
- **Juanpe** – San Luis – 2025–
- Isidro Lángara – España – 1943–46
- Carlos Leblanc Pallas – Veracruz – 1943–44
- **Rafa Llorente** – San Luis – 2026–
- Florentino López – Toluca – 1960–70
- Pau López – Toluca – 2025
- Luna – Monterrey – 2000–01
- Javier Manjarín – Celaya, Santos Laguna – 2001–02, 2002–03
- Cheché Martín – Atlético Morelia – 1960–1961
- Édgar Méndez – Cruz Azul, Necaxa – 2017–20, 2022–24
- Jorge Meré – América, Mazatlán – 2022, 2022
- Sabin Merino – San Luis – 2022–23
- Míchel – Celaya – 1996–97
- **Monchu** – Juárez – 2026–
- Iván Moreno y Fabianesi – Morelia – 2006
- Carlos Muñoz – Puebla – 1996–98
- Josu Ortuondo – Atlético Español – 1980–82
- Miguel Pardeza – Puebla – 1998–99
- Benito Pardo – Pachuca, Puebla, Atlético Español, Cruz Azul – 1969–70, 1970–72, 1972–78, 1978–79
- Rafael Paz – Celaya – 1997
- Róber Pier – Atlas – 2025
- Pirri – Puebla – 1980–82
- Sergio Ramos – Monterrey – 2025
- Luis Regueiro – América – 1943–44
- Borja Sánchez – León – 2023
- Raúl Sánchez – Club Necaxa – 2025–26
- Ángel Suárez Martínez – C.D. Oro – 1969–72
- Raúl Tamudo – Pachuca – 2012
- **Óliver Torres** – Monterrey – 2024–
- Mariano Uceda – América – 1946–47
- Joaquín Urquiaga – Asturias, Veracruz – 1943–44, 1944–46
- Rafael Martín Vázquez – Celaya – 1998
- Víctor Vázquez – Cruz Azul – 2016
- Martí Ventolrà – Atlante – 1943–49
- **Fran Villalba** – Santos Laguna – 2024–
- **Óscar Whalley** – Guadalajara – 2026–

=== Switzerland ===
- Alessandro Mangiarratti – Atlas – 2005
- Jörg Stiel – Toros Neza – 1993–94

=== Turkey ===
- Colin Kazim-Richards – Lobos BUAP, Veracruz, Pachuca – 2018, 2019, 2020

=== Wales ===
- Aaron Ramsey – Pumas – 2025

== North and Central America, Caribbean (CONCACAF) ==
=== Canada ===
- **Lucas Cavallini** – Puebla, Tijuana – 2017–19/2024–, 2023
- Stephen Eustáquio – Cruz Azul – 2019
- **Marcelo Flores** – Tigres – 2023–
- Paul James – Monterrey – 1985–87
- John Kerr, Sr. – América – 1972–73
- **Santiago López** – Pumas – 2024–
- Tibor Vigh – Laguna, Torreón – 1969–70, 1970–71

=== Costa Rica ===
- Ever Alfaro – Atlante – 2011
- Evelio Alpízar – Atlas, Nacional – 1956–57, 1961–62
- Carlos Alvarado Villalobos – América – 1947–48
- Alfonso Arnáez – Moctezuma – 1943–49
- Javier Astua – Morelia – 1992–93
- Leonel Boza – León – 1953–57
- Hernán Cabalceta – América – 1943–46
- Francisco Calvo – Juárez – 2024
- Joel Campbell – León, Monterrey – 2019–21/2022–23, 2021–22
- Quico Chacón – Atlas – 1956–57
- Edwin Cubero – Atlas, Puebla – 1945–54, 1954–55
- Eduardo Echeverría – Torreón – 1970–71
- Quino Fernández – América – 1950–51
- Guido Matamoros – América – 1943–46
- Rónald Gómez – Irapuato –2004
- Mauricio Solís – Irapuato –2004
- Alonso Solís – Necaxa – 2008
- Pablo Gabas – Necaxa, Querétaro, Chiapas – 2008–09, 2013–14
- Carlos Herrera – Atlético Morelia – 1961–62
- Wedell Jímenez – Toluca – 1953–63
- Alex Madrigal – Veracruz – 2003
- Hernán Medford – Pachuca, León, Necaxa – 1996–97, 1997–00, 2000–01
- Wálter Meneses – Puebla, Moctezuma, ADO – 1944–45, 1945–47, 1947–49
- José Rafael Meza – Moctezuma, Atlante – 1944–45/1948–49, 1945–48
- Édgar Murillo – San Sebastián – 1947–49
- Evaristo Murillo – Moctezuma, Veracruz, Zacatepec – 1943–48, 1948–50, 1951–55
- Mario Murillo – Moctezuma, Veracruz – 1945–48, 1948–49
- Roy Myers – Pachuca – 1996–97
- **Keylor Navas** – Pumas – 2025–
- Reynaldo Parks – Tecos – 1998–01
- Jorge Quezada – América – 1948–50
- Ramón Rodríguez Soto – Irapuato – 1954–58
- Oscar Emilio Rojas – La Piedad, Dorados, Veracruz, Jaguares, Morelia – 2001–02, 2004–05, 2005–06, 2006–08, 2009
- Emilio Sagot – Zacatepec, Atlante, Pachuca – 1965–66, 1966–67, 1967–68
- Carlos Silva Loaiza – Moctezuma – 1944–47
- Rodrigo Solano – Atlas – 1943–49
- Jorge Solís – Atlas, Nacional – 1956–57, 1961–62
- Jafet Soto – Morelia, Atlas, Pachuca, Puebla, Tecos – 1995–97/2001, 1998, 1998–99, 1999–00/2002–04, 2000–01
- José Luis Soto – Irapuato – 1954–56
- Juan Iván Soto – América – 1957–58
- Gerson Torres – América, Necaxa – 2017, 2018
- Juan Ulloa – León – 1965-66
- Guillermo Valenciano – Veracruz – 1963–65
- **Juan Pablo Vargas** – Puebla – 2026–
- Max Villalobos – Irapuato – 1955–68
- Harold Wallace – San Luis – 2002–03

=== Cuba ===
- Edelmiro Arnauda – España, Puebla, Necaxa, América – 1947–50, 1950–51, 1951–57, 1958–59
- Ovidio Arnauda – Toluca – 1953–54
- Pedro Arnauda – América, Asturias, Necaxa, Zacatepec, Cuautla – 1947–49, 1949–50, 1950–52, 1952–56, 1956–58
- Juan Ayra – España – 1944–45
- Fernando Blanco – Veracruz – 1944–45
- Manuel Gil Fernández – España – 1944–50
- Manuel González – Veracruz – 1944–45
- Jose Antonio Rodríguez – España, Atlante – 1944–50, 1950–56
- Juan Tuñas – España – 1941–45

=== Curaçao ===
- Ronald Martell – América – 1961–62

=== El Salvador ===
- Mauricio Cienfuegos – Morelia, Santos Laguna, Tampico Madero – 1991–92, 1992–93, 1994–95
- Gualberto Fernández – Atlante – 1970
- Norberto Huezo – Monterrey – 1977
- Salvador Méndez – ADO, San Sebastián – 1944–45, 1945–46
- Amando Moreno – Tijuana – 2016
- Nildeson – Toluca, Correcaminos, Toros Neza – 1993–94, 1994–95, 1996–97
- Luis Ramírez Zapata – Puebla – 1978
- Jaime Rodríguez – León, Atlas – 1982–84, 1986–90

=== Guatemala ===
- Alan Casasola – Atlas – 1998
- Alfredo Castellanos – Atlante – 1944–45
- Vicente Castellanos – Veracruz – 1944–45
- Salvador Hernández – San Sebastián – 1950–51
- Antonio López – América, Necaxa – 2018–22, 2022
- Martín Machón – Santos Laguna, Atlas – 1999, 2002
- Armando Mazariegos – León – 1965–66
- **Daniel Méndez** – Pachuca – 2026–
- Guillermo Ramírez – Jaguares – 2003
- Rubio Rubin – Tijuana, Querétaro – 2018, 2024
- Carlos Ruíz – Puebla – 2009–10
- David Stokes – Oro – 1966–68

=== Honduras ===
- Geovany Ávila – Pachuca – 1992–93
- Brayan Beckeles Necaxa – 2016–19
- Eduardo Bennett – Cobras – 1991–92
- Luis Enrique Cálix – Santos Laguna – 1990–91
- Joshua Canales – Querétaro – 2021
- Michaell Chirinos – Lobos BUAP – 2018–19
- Carlo Costly – Atlas – 2011
- Félix Crisanto – Lobos BUAP – 2018–19
- Arnold Cruz – Correcaminos, Toluca, Morelia – 1994–95, 1995–96, 1996
- Eugenio Dolmo Flores – Santos Laguna – 1990–92
- Juan Alberto Flores Madariaga – Santos Laguna – 1990–94
- Julio César de León – Celaya – 2000
- Alberth Elis – Monterrey – 2016
- Amado Guevara – Toros Neza – 2001
- Walter Hernández – Puebla – 2002
- Anthony Lozano – Santos Laguna – 2024–25
- Emil Martínez – Indios – 2010
- Raúl Martínez Sambulá – Correcaminos – 1988–94
- Ninrrol Medina – Atlante – 2005
- Milton Núñez – Pachuca, Necaxa – 2002, 2003–04
- Ramón Núñez – Puebla, Cruz Azul – 2009, 2009
- César Obando – Correcaminos – 1994–95
- Carlos Padilla – Correcaminos – 1999
- Carlos Pavón – Toluca, Necaxa, Celaya, Morelia, Cruz Azul – 1994–95, 1997–98, 1998–00, 2000–01/2004, 2005
- Alejandro Pineda Chacón – Correcaminos – 1994–95
- Tomás Róchez – Santos Laguna – 1990–91
- Christian Santamaría – Celaya – 1999
- Richardson Smith – Correcaminos, Leones Negros – 1991–92, 1992–93
- Danilo Turcios – Tecos – 2003–04
- Wilmer Velasquez – Atlas – 2001–06
- Georgie Welcome – Atlas – 2011

=== Jamaica ===
- Ravel Morrison – Atlas – 2017–18
- Shamar Nicholson – Tijuana – 2025

=== Panama ===
- Felipe Baloy – Monterrey, Santos Laguna, Morelia, Atlas – 2005–09, 2010–13, 2014–15, 2015–16
- Yoel Bárcenas – Mazatlán – 2022–26
- **Adalberto Carrasquilla** – Pumas – 2025–
- **Ismael Díaz** – León – 2025–
- Víctor René Mendieta – Correcaminos, Leones Negros, Tampico Madero – 1990–92, 1992–93, 1994–95
- Roberto Nurse – Sinaloa, Pachuca – 2015, 2020–21
- Blas Pérez – Tigres, Pachuca, San Luis – 2008, 2009, 2010
- **José Luis Rodríguez** – Juárez – 2024–
- Luis Tejada – Toluca, Veracruz – 2012–13, 2013
- Gabriel Torres – Pumas – 2021

=== Trinidad and Tobago ===
- Warren Archibald – San Luis – 1973–74
- Everald Cummings – Veracruz – 1974–75
- Steve David – San Luis – 1973–74

=== United States ===
- Richard Allan Adams – Santos Laguna – 1991–92
- **Daniel Aguirre** – Guadalajara – 2025–
- Jozy Altidore – Puebla – 2022
- Ventura Alvarado – América, Necaxa, Santos Laguna, San Luis, Juárez, Mazatlán – 2012–16, 2013–14/2018–20, 2017, 2020–21, 2022–23, 2023–25
- Frankie Amaya – Toluca – 2024–25
- Daniel Antúnez – Estudiantes – 2011
- **Fernando Arce** – Tijuana, Necaxa, Juárez, Puebla, Toluca – 2014/2019, 2020–21/2023–24, 2022, 2023/2025, 2025–
- Paul Arriola – Tijuana – 2013–17
- Marcelo Balboa – León – 1995–96
- DaMarcus Beasley – Puebla – 2011–14
- Scott Benedetti – Pumas – 1991–92
- Anwar Ben Rhouma – Mazatlán – 2025–26
- Jonathan Bornstein – Tigres, Atlante, Querétaro – 2011–13, 2014, 2015–18
- **Nico Carrera** – Atlante – 2026–
- Edgar Castillo – Santos Laguna, América, Tigres, San Luis, Puebla, Tijuana, Atlas, Monterrey – 2005–08, 2009/2011, 2009–10, 2010, 2011, 2012–14, 2014–15, 2015–18
- **Edwin Cerrillo** – América – 2026–
- **Jaidyn Contreras** – Tigres – 2026–
- Joe Corona – Tijuana, Veracruz, Sinaloa, América – 2011–15/2017/2019/2024–26, 2015, 2016, 2018
- Cade Cowell – Guadalajara – 2024–25
- **Mauricio Cuevas** – Santos Laguna – 2026–
- **Benny Díaz** – Tijuana, Juárez – 2021, 2024–
- Landon Donovan – León – 2018
- Chris Edwinson – Atlas – 1988–89
- Gabriel Farfan – Chiapas – 2013–16
- **Marco Farfan** – Tigres – 2025–
- Daniel Flores – Guadalajara – 2025
- Joe Gallardo – Querétaro – 2021
- Greg Garza – Tijuana, Atlas – 2012–15/2016, 2015
- Mike Getchell – Monterrey – 1988–89
- Luis Gil – Querétaro – 2016–17
- Hérculez Gómez – Puebla, Pachuca, Estudiantes, Santos Laguna, Tijuana, Tigres – 2010/2015, 2010–11, 2011, 2012–13, 2013–14, 2014
- Omar Gonzalez – Pachuca, Atlas – 2016–18, 2018–19
- Sonny Guadarrama – Santos Laguna, Morelia, Atlante – 2006–07, 2008, 2010–12
- Alonso Hernández – Monterrey – 2012–15
- Daniel Hernández – Necaxa, Puebla, Jaguares – 2003–05/2009, 2007, 2008
- Miguel Ibarra – León – 2015
- Dominic Kinnear – Necaxa – 1994–95
- Cle Kooiman – Cobras, Cruz Azul – 1990–91, 1992–94
- **Danny Leyva** – Necaxa – 2026–
- Rodrigo López – Toluca, Veracruz – 2017, 2019
- Lawrence Lozzano – Tampico – 1995-95
- Alex Mendez – Juárez – 2024–25
- Sammy Ochoa – Estudiantes – 2006–10
- Michael Orozco – San Luis, Puebla, Tijuana, Lobos BUAP – 2006–09/2011–12, 2013–15, 2015–18, 2018–19
- **Ralph Orquin** – Juárez, América – 2024–25, 2025–
- **Walter Portales** – América, Puebla, Atlante – 2025, 2025, 2026–
- Tab Ramos – Tigres – 1995–96
- John Requejo – Tijuana – 2016
- Jacobo Reyes – Monterrey – 2021–22
- **David Rodríguez** – San Luis – 2021–22/2024/2026–
- Adrián Ruelas – Santos Laguna, Jaguares – 2011, 2011–12
- **Paxon Ruffin** – Monterrey – 2026–
- Jorge Salcedo – Morelia – 1995
- Sebastián Saucedo – Veracruz, Pumas, Toluca, Juárez – 2016, 2020–22, 2022–23, 2023–24
- Alan Soñora – Juárez – 2023
- Joel Soñora – Juárez – 2023
- Mike Sorber – Pumas – 1994–96
- Jonathan Suárez – Querétaro, Tijuana – 2018–20, 2022
- José Francisco Torres – Pachuca, Tigres, Puebla – 2006–2012, 2013–17, 2018
- Brandon Vázquez – Monterrey – 2024
- Marco Vidal – Pachuca, León, Veracruz – 2010, 2011–12, 2016
- Jorge Villafaña – Santos Laguna – 2016–18
- Jean Willrich Pumas – 1979–80
- Eric Wynalda – León – 1999
- William Yarbrough – León – 2012–19
- **Alejandro Zendejas** – Guadalajara, Necaxa, América – 2016–17/2018–20, 2020–21, 2022–

== South America (CONMEBOL) ==
=== Argentina ===
- Roberto Aballay – Asturias – 1944–45
- **Lucas Abascia** – Querétaro – 2026–
- Matías Abelairas – Puebla – 2012
- Luciano Acosta – Atlas – 2020–21
- Héctor Adomaitis – Santos Laguna, Cruz Azul, Puebla – 1993–97, 1997–01, 2001–02
- Emanuel Aguilera – Tijuana, América, Atlas – 2016–17, 2018–21, 2022
- Jonás Aguirre – Necaxa, Puebla – 2017, 2017
- Lucas Albertengo – Monterrey – 2018
- Rafael Albrecht – León, Atlas – 1970–74, 1974–75
- Fabián Alegre – Atlas – 1992–93
- Germán Alemanno – Gallos Blancos – 2012
- **Facundo Almada** – Mazatlán, Puebla – 2023–26, 2026–
- Agustín Almendra – Necaxa – 2026
- Jorge Almirón – Atlas, Morelia, Gallos Blancos, Atlante – 1997–99, 2000–04, 2006–07, 2007–08
- Rafael Altube – Tampico – 1945–50
- Matías Alustiza – Puebla, Pachuca, Atlas, Pumas – 2012–14/2015–16/2019, 2014, 2017, 2018
- Favio Álvarez – Pumas – 2020–22
- Ricky Álvarez – Atlas – 2018–19
- Horacio Ameli – América – 2004
- **Bruno Amione** – Santos Laguna – 2024–
- Luis Antonio Amuchástegui – América – 1986–87
- **Esteban Andrada** – Monterrey – 2021–25/2026–
- Martín Andrizzi – Dorados – 2004
- Alfredo Anhielo – Tampico, Potosino – 1978–79, 1979–80
- Antonio Apud – Santos Laguna, Veracruz, León – 1992–95, 1995–96, 1996
- Germán Arangio – Toros Neza, Atlante – 1996–00, 2000–01
- Raúl Aredes – Monterrey – 1994–96
- Emiliano Armenteros – Jaguares, Santos Laguna – 2014–16, 2016–17
- Marcelo Asteggiano – Cruz Azul – 1989–90
- Daniel Asteguiano – Cruz Azul – 1979–80, Atlético Español 1981–82, Atlas – 1982–83
- Rubén Astigarraga – Zacatepec – 1975–77
- Rodrigo Astudillo – Cruz Azul – 2001
- Juan Pablo Avendaño – San Luis – 2005
- Rubén Ayala – Jalisco, Atlante – 1979–80, 1980–84
- Juan Manuel Azconzábal – Tecos – 2002–03
- Eduardo Bacas – Tigres – 1990–91
- Tomás Badaloni – Necaxa – 2024–26
- Eduardo Balassanian – Atlante 1961–62
- Emilio Baldonedo – Monterrey, Puebla – 1945–46, 1946–47
- Claudio Baravane – Tampico Madero – 1989–90
- Miguel Barbieri – Tijuana, Toluca, Querétaro – 2020, 2021, 2023–24
- David Barbona – Tijuana, Querétaro – 2020–22, 2022
- Ciro Barbosa – San Luis – 1971–72
- Mariano Barbosa – Atlas – 2009–10
- Marcelo Barovero – Necaxa, Monterrey, San Luis – 2016–18, 2018–20, 2021–23
- Maximiliano Barreiro – Necaxa – 2017
- **Sergio Barreto** – Pachuca – 2023–
- Pablo Barrientos – Toluca – 2016–19
- Marcelo Barticciotto – América – 1993–94
- José María Basanta – Monterrey – 2008–14/2015–20
- Damián Batallini – San Luis, Necaxa – 2021, 2023
- Osvaldo Batocletti – León, Tigres – 1975–77, 1977–84
- Antonio Battaglia – León – 1944–52
- Edgardo Bauza – Veracruz – 1990–91
- Fernando Belluschi – Cruz Azul – 2015
- Tomás Belmonte – Toluca – 2023–24
- Néstor Benedetich – León – 2000
- Darío Benedetto – Tijuana, América, Querétaro – 2013–14, 2015–16, 2024
- Óscar Benítez – San Luis – 2019
- Gonzalo Bergessio – Atlas – 2015–16
- Eduardo Berizzo – Atlas – 1993–96
- Hernán Bernardello – Cruz Azul – 2014
- Ángel Bernuncio – Necaxa, Toros Neza – 1992–93, 1993–94
- Alfredo Jesús Berti – Atlas – 1995
- Sergio Berti – América – 1999–00
- Pablo Bezombe – Morelia – 1999
- Maxi Biancucchi – Cruz Azul – 2010
- Daniel Bilos – América – 2007
- Víctor Binello – Morelia – 1981–84
- Domingo Blanco – Tijuana – 2023–26
- Ismael Blanco – San Luis – 2011–12
- Ángel Bocanelli – León – 1981–82
- Norberto Boggio – Atlante – 1963–71
- Pablo Facundo Bonvín – Dorados – 2005
- Miguel Ángel Bordón – Atlas – 1981–82/1983–84
- Mauro Boselli – León – 2013–18
- Carlos Bossio – Gallos Blancos – 2009–10
- Rubén Botta – Pachuca – 2015–17
- Darío Bottinelli – Atlas, Toluca – 2008–10, 2015–16
- Jonathan Bottinelli – León – 2014–15
- Gustavo Bou – Tijuana – 2017–19
- Lucas Bovaglio – Estudiantes – 2011–12
- Diego Braghieri – Tijuana – 2019
- Sergio Bratti – Monterrey – 1977–78
- Martín Bravo – Pumas, León, Sinaloa, Santos Laguna, Veracruz – 2008–14, 2014–15, 2015, 2016, 2017–18
- **Juan Brunetta** – Santos Laguna, Tigres – 2022–23, 2024–
- Sebastián Brusco – Toros Neza – 1999
- Hernán Buján – Morelia – 2002
- José María Buljubasich – Morelia – 2001–02
- **Ezequiel Bullaude** – Tijuana, Santos Laguna – 2025, 2026–
- Diego Buonanotte – Pachuca – 2014–15
- Guillermo Burdisso – León – 2015–18
- Carlos Bustos – Morelia – 1997, 1999
- Diego Daniel Bustos – Veracruz – 1995
- Eduardo Ariel Bustos – Atlas – 1999/2001
- Nahuel Bustos – Pachuca – 2019
- Roberto Cabral – Atlas – 1981–82
- Gustavo Cabral – Estudiantes, Pachuca – 2010–11, 2019–25
- Florencio Caffaratti – América – 1943–52
- Matías Cahais – Veracruz – 2016
- José Luis Calderón – América, Atlas – 2000–01, 2001–03
- Francisco Campana – América – 1958–59
- Cristian Campestrini – Puebla – 2015–17
- Javier Cámpora – Cruz Azul, Jaguares, Puebla – 2006, 2007, 2008
- Patricio Camps – Tecos – 2003–04
- Alexis Canelo – Jaguares, Puebla, Toluca, Tijuana – 2016, 2016–17/2026, 2017–22, 2022–23
- Germán Cano – Pachuca, León – 2015/2017, 2016–17
- Gustavo Canto – Tijuana – 2018
- Ignacio Canuto – León – 2015
- **Manuel Capasso** – Atlas – 2026–
- Marcelo Capirossi – Pachuca, Santos Laguna – 1992–93, 1998
- Gabriel Carabajal – Puebla – 2023–24
- Milton Caraglio – Sinaloa, Tijuana, Atlas, Cruz Azul – 2016, 2016–17, 2017–18/2021, 2018–20
- Mauricio Caranta – Santos Laguna – 2005–06
- Juan Carlos Cárdenas – Puebla, Veracruz – 1972–74/1975–76, 1974–75
- Martín Cardetti – Pumas – 2005
- Neri Cardozo – Jaguares, Monterrey, Querétaro – 2009, 2010–16/2017, 2016–17
- Andrés Carevic – Atlante – 2003/2007–11
- Mario Enrique Cariaga – Atlas – 1981–83
- Luis Carniglia – Atlas – 1945–46
- Marcelo Carracedo – Santos Laguna, Morelia – 1994–96, 1996
- **Julián Carranza** – Necaxa – 2026–
- Ramiro Carrera – Cruz Azul – 2023
- Roberto Hugo Carril – Laguna, Santos Laguna, Atlético Español – 1975–76, 1976–77, 1977–78
- Federico Carrizo – Cruz Azul – 2015
- Juan Pablo Carrizo – Monterrey – 2017–18
- Marcelo Carrusca – Cruz Azul – 2008–09
- Carlos Casartelli – Atlante, Veracruz, Gallos Blancos, Monterrey, Tecos – 2000–01, 2002–03, 2004, 2005, 2006
- **Facundo Cáseres** – Santos Laguna – 2026–
- Santiago Cáseres – América – 2020
- Hugo Norberto Castillo – Monterrey, Atlas, América, Santos Laguna – 1996–97, 1998–01, 2002–04, 2004–06
- Alexis Castro – Tijuana – 2020
- **Nicolás Castro** – Toluca – 2025–
- Martín Cauteruccio – Cruz Azul – 2017–19
- Juan Manuel Cavallo – San Luis – 2011
- Emanuel Cecchini – León – 2018
- Mauro Cejas – Tecos, Monterrey, Pachuca, Santos Laguna, Morelia, Puebla – 2007–08/2009–11, 2008, 2011–12, 2013–14, 2015, 2016
- Emanuel Centurión – Atlas – 2008–11
- Iván Centurión – Puebla – 2017
- Ricardo Centurión – San Luis – 2019
- Maximiliano Cerato – León – 2017–18
- Carlos Chavano – Atlas, Atlante – 1957–63, 1963–66
- Diego Cocca – Atlas, Veracruz – 1999–01, 2003–04
- Jorge Coch – Toluca, Puebla, Veracruz, Zacatepec – 1971–72, ?, 1975–76, 1976–77
- Raúl Héctor Cocherari – Curtidores – 1977–78
- Hugo Colace – Estudiantes – 2011–12
- Santiago Colombatto – León – 2021–22
- Diego Colotto – Tecos, Atlas – 2005–07, 2007–08
- Cristian Colusso – León – 1997
- Jorge Comas – Veracruz – 1989–94
- Ángel David Comizzo – Tigres, León, Morelia – 1990–91, 1996–98, 1999–01
- Germán Conti – Atlas – 2020
- Rodrigo Contreras – Necaxa – 2019
- Miguel Ángel Converti Jr. – León – 1979
- Marcos Conigliaro – Jalisco – 1971–72
- Nicolás Cordero – Querétaro – 2023–24
- Matías Córdoba – Atlante – 2011
- Facundo Coria – Pachuca – 2011
- Oscar Roberto Cornejo – Dorados – 2004–05
- Miguel Ángel Cornero – América, Cruz Azul, Toluca – 1974–77, 1977–81, 1983–84
- **Mateo Coronel** – Querétaro – 2025–
- Ángel Correa – Tigres – 2025–26
- Javier Correa – Santos Laguna, Atlas – 2019/2022–23, 2019–21
- Hugo Coscia – Potosino – 1975–77
- Eduardo Coudet – San Luis, Necaxa – 2007–08/2009, 2009
- Walter Coyette – Atlas – 2001–02
- Ariel Cozzoni – Toluca – 1992
- Hernán Cristante – Toluca – 1993–94/1995–96/1998–09
- Oscar Craiyacich – León – 1981–82
- Jonatan Cristaldo – Cruz Azul, Monterrey – 2016, 2017
- Federico Crivelli – Jaguares – 2016
- Maximiliano Cuberas – Toluca – 2001–04
- Bernardo Cuesta – Puebla – 2020
- Juan Cuevas – Toluca, San Luis, Atlante, León – 2010–11, 2011/2013, 2011–12, 2016
- Leandro Cufré – Atlas, Leones Negros – 2012–14, 2014–15
- Hugo Curioni – Toluca – 1980
- Darío Cvitanich – Pachuca – 2010–11/2015
- Juan Carlos Czentoriky – Jalisco, Curtidores, Puebla – 1971–72, 1975–1977, 1977–78
- Ricardo Dabrowski – Toluca – 1984–85
- Mariano Dalla Libera – Atlas – 1989–90
- Israel Damonte – Veracruz – 2006
- Luciano De Bruno – Jaguares – 2003
- Vicente de la Mata – Necaxa, Veracruz – 1970–71, 1971–76
- César Delgado – Cruz Azul, Monterrey – 2003–07, 2011–15
- Marcelo Delgado – Cruz Azul – 1994–95/2003–04
- Pedro Dellacha – Necaxa – 1959–62
- Gustavo Del Prete – Pumas, Mazatlán, Atlas – 2022–24, 2024, 2025–26
- Roberto Andres Depietri – Toluca, Pumas – 1990–94, 1995–96
- Gustavo Dezotti – León, Atlas – 1994–96, 1996–97
- Daniel Díaz – Cruz Azul – 2003–04
- Gonzalo Díaz – América, Tijuana – 2014, 2016
- Jorge Manuel Díaz – Veracruz – 1993
- Leandro Díaz – Veracruz – 2017
- Roberto Díaz – Tampico, Tigres, América, León – 1977–78, 1978–79, 1980–81, 1981–82
- Rodrigo Díaz – Toluca – 2005–06
- Juan Dinenno – Pumas – 2020–23
- Jerónimo di Florio – León, Irapuato – 1954–66, 1966–67
- Marcos Aurelio Di Paulo – León – 1947–48
- Franco Di Santo – Tijuana – 2022
- **Lucas Di Yorio** – León, Pachuca, Santos Laguna – 2022–23, 2023, 2026–
- Federico Domínguez – Santos Laguna – 2004
- Nery Domínguez – Querétaro – 2016
- Sebastián Domínguez – América – 2008
- Cristian Domizi – Atlas, Pumas, Monterrey – 1993–95, 1996–98, 1998
- Alejandro Donatti – Tijuana – 2017
- Manuel Duarte – Querétaro – 2023
- Francisco Dutari – Pumas – 2014
- Gustavo Pedro Echaniz – América, Puebla, Cobras de Querétaro – 1983–84, 1984–85, 1986–87
- Javier Elizondo – Gallos Blancos – 2010
- Hernán Encina – Tecos, Atlas – 2007, 2007
- Gabriel Esparza – Puebla – 2017
- Marcelo Espina – Irapuato, Atlante, Correcaminos – 1990–91, 1991–92, 1993–94
- Fabián Espíndola – Necaxa – 2016–17
- **Matías Espíndola** – Necaxa – 2026–
- Javier Alejandro Espínola – Necaxa, América – 1999, 1999
- Facundo Erpen – Atlas, Puebla, Morelia, Lobos BUAP – 2012–15/2017, 2015, 2015–17, 2018
- Walter Erviti – Monterrey, Atlante – 2002–08, 2013–14
- Damián Escudero – Puebla – 2016
- Alberto Etcheverry – León, Irapuato, Pumas, Atlante, Jabatos – 1958–61, 1961–62, 1963–64, 1965–66, 1966–69
- Jonathan Fabbro – Sinaloa – 2005
- Juan Carlos Falcón – Atlante – 2005–06
- **Lorenzo Faravelli** – Cruz Azul, Necaxa – 2024–25, 2026–
- Daniel Fasciolli – Veracruz – 1996–97
- Alejandro Faurlín – Cruz Azul – 2017
- Marcelo Favaretto – América, Toros Neza – 1981–82, 1982–85
- Juan Manuel Fedorco – Puebla – 2025
- Brian Fernández – Necaxa – 2018–19
- Gastón Fernández – Monterrey, Tigres – 2006, 2008–09
- Guillermo Fernández – Cruz Azul – 2019/2021
- Mauro Fernández – Juárez – 2019–20
- Héctor Ferrari – América – 1953–54
- Facundo Ferreyra – Tijuana – 2022
- Nelson Festa – América – 1958–59
- Emilio Fizel – América – 1953–57
- Juan Ramón Fleita – Toros Neza – 1997–99
- Luciano Figueroa – Cruz Azul – 2004
- Lucio Filomeno – Jaguares – 2002–04
- Silvio Fogel – Torreón, Puebla, Cruz Azul – 1973–74, 1975–80/1982–83, 1980–81
- Juan Forlín – Querétaro – 2015–17
- Mauro Formica – Cruz Azul, Pumas – 2013–15, 2017–18
- Mario Franceschini – Morelia- 1981–82
- **Alan Franco** – Tigres – 2026–
- Ariel Franco – Toluca – 2002–03
- Darío Franco – Atlas, Morelia – 1995–97, 1998–04
- Nicolás Freire – Pumas – 2019–23
- Adonis Frías – León – 2023–25
- Fabricio Fuentes – Atlas – 2005–06/2010
- Ramiro Funes Mori – Cruz Azul – 2022–23
- Julio Furch – Veracruz, Santos Laguna, Atlas – 2015–16, 2017–20, 2021–23
- Pablo Antonio Gabas – Necaxa, Querétaro, Jaguares – 2008–09, 2013, 2014
- Jorge Luis Gabrich – Irapuato, Veracruz, Tecos – 1989–90, 1990–92, 1992–94
- Alejandro Gagliardi – Morelia – 2016
- Walter Gaitán – Tigres, Necaxa – 2002–07, 2008
- Mario Raúl Galasso – América – 1946–47
- José Gallego – Necaxa – 1993–94
- Rubén Horacio Galletti – Tecos – 1975–78
- Martín Galmarini – Atlante – 2013–14
- Diego Galván – Morelia – 2002
- Darío Gandín – Necaxa – 2010–11
- Javier Gandolfi – Jaguares, Tijuana – 2009–10, 2011–16
- Óscar Garanzini – América – 1958–59
- Ariel Garcé – Morelia – 2003
- Mateo García – Atlas – 2023–26
- Matías García – Juárez – 2021–22
- Óscar García – Toros Neza – 1994–95
- Rodolfo García – Atlas, Morelia, Monterrey, Pachuca – 1995–97, 1998, 1999, 2004
- Santiago García – Toluca – 2017–19
- Daniel Garnero – Toros Neza – 2000
- Roberto Daniel Gasparini – Necaxa, Tigres, Monterrey – 1988–89, 1989–94, 1994–95
- Enzo Gennoni – Laguna – 1971–73
- Mauro Néstor Gerk – Gallos Blancos, Tijuana – 2006–07/2009, 2011–12
- Jorge Luis Ghiso – Tecos – 1979–80
- Emmanuel Gigliotti – Toluca, León – 2019–20, 2020–21
- Christian Giménez – Veracruz, América, Pachuca, Cruz Azul – 2004–05, 2005–06, 2006–09/2018, 2010–18
- Christian Eduardo Giménez – Toluca – 2007–08
- Milton Giménez – Necaxa – 2022–23
- Luis Giribet – San Luis – 1971–73
- Blas Giunta – Toluca – 1993–95
- Alejandro Glaría – Pachuca, Puebla, Pumas, Jaguares – 1998–00, 2000, 2001, 2002
- Paolo Goltz – América – 2014–17
- Alberto Gómez – Cruz Azul, Potosino, Deportivo Neza – 1971–76, 1976–77, 1979–80
- Alberto Martín Gómez – Morelia – 2002–03
- Pablo Hernán Gómez – Morelia, Pachuca – 1998, 1999–01
- Pablo Leandro Gómez – Puebla, Querétaro – 2019, 2021
- Rodrigo Gómez – Toluca – 2016–17
- Ariel González – Irapuato, América, San Luis, Pumas, Veracruz – 2003, 2004, 2005–06/2007, 2006–07, 2008
- Diego González – Santos Laguna, Tijuana – 2015–16, 2018–19
- Esteban Alberto González – Gallos Blancos – 2009
- Federico González – Puebla – 2017
- **Francisco González** – Tijuana – 2026–
- Lucas González – Santos Laguna – 2023
- Pedro González – Morelia – 1992–94
- Ramiro González – León, San Luis – 2019–20/2021, 2020–21
- Sergio Nelson González – Santos Laguna, Morelia, Cobras, Atlante – 1988–89, 1990–91, 1991–92, 1992–93
- Leandro González Pírez – Tijuana – 2020
- Raúl Gordillo – América, Necaxa, Atlante – 1996, 1998, 1999
- Hugo Gottfrit – Potosino, Atlante – 1976–78, 1978–80
- César Gradito – Atlas, Estudiantes – 2004–07, 2010
- Claudio Graf – Veracruz, Tecos – 2008, 2009
- Mario Grana – Monterrey, Celaya, Colibríes – 2002, 2002, 2003
- Facundo Gutiérrez – Necaxa – 2026
- Fernando Ezequiel Gutiérrez – Estudiantes – 2012
- Marcos Gutiérrez – Toros Neza – 1998
- **Nahuel Guzmán** – Tigres – 2014–
- Gabriel Hachen – Juárez – 2019
- René Hanssen – América – 1944–45
- Gabriel Hauche – Tijuana, Toluca – 2015–16, 2017–18
- Patricio Hernández – Cruz Azul – 1989
- Emanuel Herrera – Tigres, Lobos BUAP – 2014, 2017
- **Luciano Herrera** – Pumas – 2026–
- Federico Higuaín – América – 2008
- Rodrigo Holgado – Veracruz – 2017
- Henry Homann – Puebla – 1995
- Santiago Hoyos – Santos Laguna – 2011–12
- Horacio Humoller – Toluca, Atlante – 1990–95, 1995–96
- Juan Carlos Hurt – Veracruz – 1970–71
- Humberto Iacono – América – 1953–54
- **Nicolás Ibáñez** – San Luis, Pachuca, Tigres, Cruz Azul – 2019–21, 2021–23, 2023–26, 2026–
- Federico Illanes – Veracruz – 2019
- Gaspar Iñíguez – Veracruz – 2019
- Cristian Insaurralde – América – 2018–19
- Juan Manuel Insaurralde – Jaguares – 2015–16
- Federico Insúa – América, Necaxa – 2007–08, 2009
- Luis Islas – Toluca, León – 1996–97, 2001–02
- Carlos Izquierdoz – Santos Laguna – 2014–18
- Tomás Jacob – Necaxa – 2025
- Franco Jara – Pachuca – 2015–20
- Jorge Jerez – Celaya, Colibríes – 1998–02, 2003
- Walter Jiménez – Veracruz, Jaguares, Santos Laguna, Puebla – 2003–05, 2006, 2006–10, 2011
- Alberto Jorge – León, Tampico, Oaxtepec – 1975–76, 1978–79, 1982–84
- Enzo Kalinski – Tijuana – 2017
- Walter Kannemann – Atlas – 2015–16
- Matías Kranevitter – Monterrey – 2020–22
- Pablo Kratina – Santos Laguna – 1992–93
- Julio César Laffatigue – Gallos Blancos – 2010
- Federico Lagorio – Atlas, Pumas – 1998–99, 1999–00
- Diego Lagos – Pumas – 2014
- Osvaldo Lamelza – Potosino, Zacatepec – 1975–76, 1976–77
- Luis Alberto Landaburu – Tampico – 1981–82
- Joaquín Larrivey – Atlante – 2012–13
- Joaquín Laso – San Luis – 2019
- Diego Latorre – Cruz Azul, Celaya – 1999, 2001–02
- Javier Lavallén – Pumas – 1997
- Pablo Lavallén – Atlas, Veracruz, San Luis – 1996–01, 2002, 2003–04
- Ricardo Lavolpe – Atlante, Oaxtepec – 1979–82, 1982–84
- José Antonio Lazcano – Veracruz – 1945–46
- Raúl Leguizamón – América – 1954–55
- Eduardo Lell – Cobras – 1991–92
- Fabián Lenguita – Toros Neza – 1993–94
- Federico Lértora – Tijuana, Querétaro – 2022–23, 2023–25
- Gastón Lezcano – Morelia – 2017–19
- Carlos Linazza – León – 1962–63
- Lucas Lobos – Tigres, Toluca – 2008–14, 2014–16
- Emanuel Loeschbor – Cruz Azul, Morelia – 2014–15, 2016–19
- Lisandro López – Tijuana – 2022–23
- Augusto Lotti – Cruz Azul – 2023
- Cristian Lucchetti – Santos Laguna – 2003–04
- Juan Martín Lucero – Tijuana – 2017–19
- Daniel Ludueña – Tecos, Santos Laguna, Pachuca, Pumas – 2005–06, 2007–2012, 2013, 2013–16
- Ricardo Lunari – Atlas, Puebla – 1993–95, 1995–96
- Leopoldo Luque – Tampico – 1981–82
- Federico Lussenhoff – Toros Neza, Cruz Azul – 1995–97, 2004–05
- Patricio Mac Allister – Correcaminos – 1993–94
- **Ignacio Maestro Puch** – Puebla – 2026–
- Lisandro Magallán – Pumas – 2023–25
- Adrián Mahía – Toros Neza – 1994–95
- Cristian Maidana – Atlante – 2012–13
- Jonatan Maidana – Toluca – 2019–20
- Javier Malagueño – Indios – 2008–10
- Víctor Malcorra – Tijuana, Pumas, Atlas – 2016–18, 2018–20, 2020–21
- Federico Mancuello – Toluca, Puebla – 2019–20, 2022–23
- Damián Manso – Pachuca, Jaguares, Morelia – 2009–10, 2011, 2011
- Edmundo Manzotti – Tigres – 1975–77
- Agustín Marchesín – Santos Laguna, América – 2015–16, 2017–19
- Sergio Raúl Marchi – Irapuato, Gallos Blancos – 1990–91, 1991–93
- Iván Marcone – Cruz Azul – 2018–19
- Miguel Marín – Cruz Azul – 1971–80
- Hector Marinaro – Tampico – 1962–63
- Guillermo Marino – Tigres – 2007–09
- Bruno Marioni – Atlas – Pumas, Toluca, Tecos – 2004/2005–06/2007–08/2009, 2006, 2006, 2009
- Gonzalo Maroni – Atlas – 2021–22
- Germán Martellotto – América, Monterrey – 1990–92, 1993–95
- Alejandro Martínez – Tijuana – 2023–24
- Miguel Ángel Martínez – Atlante, Jaguares, Querétaro – 2009–10, 2010–13, 2014–18
- Oswaldo Martinoli – León – 1955–56
- Roberto Aníbal Masciarelli – Atlas, Toluca, Leones Negros, Puebla – 1986–88, 1988–90, 1990–91, 1991–92
- Pedro Massacessi – Cobras, Atlante, Pumas – 1990–92, 1992–94/1995–96, 1994–95
- René Masson – América – 1950–52
- Aníbal Matellán – San Luis – 2010–12
- Pedro Maupone – América – 1950–51
- Marcos Mauro – Juárez – 2022
- Juan Meglio – Tecos, León – 1979–80, 1980–81
- Jesús Méndez – Toluca – 2016–17
- Cristian Menéndez – Veracruz, Puebla – 2017–19, 2020
- Lucas Merolla – Mazatlán – 2023–26
- Mariano Messera – Cruz Azul – 2002
- Sergio Metini – Santos Laguna – 1992–93
- Fernando Meza – Necaxa – 2016–17/2019/2021–22
- Maximiliano Meza – Monterrey – 2019–24
- Miguel Ángel Micco – Laguna, Zacatepec – 1971–76, 1976–77
- José Miguel – Santos Laguna – 1995–99
- Guido Milán – Veracruz – 2017–18
- Ezequiel Miralles – Atlante – 2013
- Leonel Miranda – Tijuana – 2019
- Antonio Mohamed – Toros Neza, Monterrey, Irapuato, Atlante, Celaya – 1993–98, 1998–00, 2001, 2001–02, 2002
- Roberto Molina – América, Atlante, Toros Neza, Puebla – 1998, 1999, 2000, 2000
- Tomás Molina – Juárez – 2023
- Daniel Montenegro – América – 2009–2012
- Walter Montillo – Morelia – 2006–07
- Walter Montoya – Cruz Azul – 2018/2021
- **Florián Monzón** – Atlas – 2026–
- Ángel Morales – Cruz Azul, Veracruz, Dorados – 1999–02, 2002–04, 2006
- Cristián Morales – Irapuato, Veracruz – 2000–01, 2002
- Maximiliano Moralez – León – 2016–17
- Alfredo Moreno – Necaxa, San Luis, América, Necaxa, Atlas, Tijuana, Puebla, Veracruz – 2001/2003–07, 2007–08/2009–10/2011–12, 2008, 2009, 2010–11, 2012–13/2014–15, 2013, 2014
- José Manuel Moreno – España – 1944–46
- Claudio Morresi – Santos Laguna – 1990–91
- Gustavo Adolfo Moriconi – Monterrey, Gallos Blancos – 1990–91, 1991–92/1993–94
- Franco Moyano – Puebla – 2025
- Víctor Javier Müller – Monterrey, Pumas, Pachuca – 2000, 2002, 2003
- Javier Muñoz – Santos Laguna, Atlante, Pachuca, León, San Luis, Jaguares – 2005, 2006–08, 2009–12, 2012, 2013, 2013–17
- Damián Musto – Tijuana – 2017–18
- Máximo Raúl Nardoni – Atlas – 1982–83
- Ariel Nahuelpán – Pumas, Pachuca, Tijuana, Querétaro, Mazatlán – 2013, 2014–16, 2019–20, 2020/2022, 2023
- Roberto Nanni – Atlante – 2013
- Cristian Nasuti – Morelia – 2005–06
- Nicolás Navarro – Querétaro – 2019
- América Nazzer – América – 1958–59
- Hugo Nervo – Santos Laguna, Atlas – 2018–19, 2019–25
- Mateo Nicolau – América – 1943–45
- Guillermo Nicosia – Morelia – 1993
- Franco Niell – Gallos Blancos – 2011
- Oscar Nova – León – 1955–56
- Diego Novaretti – Toluca, León, Querétaro – 2009–13, 2015–17, 2018–19
- Javier Novello – Atlas – 1949–51
- Juan José Novo – Atlas, León – 1948–52, 1952–53
- Rodrigo Noya – Veracruz, Necaxa, San Luis – 2015–17/2018, 2019–20, 2020–21
- Santiago Núñez – Santos Laguna – 2024–25
- **Lucas Ocampos** – Monterrey – 2024–
- Juan Carlos Oleniak – Veracruz – 1971–72
- Diego Olsina – Tijuana – 2012–13, 2014
- Gustavo Onaindía – Necaxa – 1999–00
- **Luca Orellano** – Monterrey – 2026–
- Christian Ortiz – Tijuana – 2021–22
- Fernando Ortiz – Santos Laguna, América, Tigres – 2007–08, 2009, 2009–10
- Jorge Ortiz – Tijuana – 2017
- Norberto Outes – América, Necaxa – 1981–83, 1983–85
- Norberto Pairoux – Atlas – 1945–48
- Sebastián Palacios – Pachuca – 2018
- **Agustín Palavecino** – Necaxa, Cruz Azul – 2024–25, 2026–
- Omar Palma – Veracruz – 1989–92
- Carlos Pancirolli – Irapuato, Cobras – 1989–90, 1990–91
- **José Paradela** – Necaxa, Cruz Azul – 2024–25, 2025–
- **Franco Pardo** – Santos Laguna – 2026–
- Nicolás Pareja – Atlas – 2019
- Lucas Passerini – Cruz Azul, Necaxa, San Luis – 2019/2021, 2020, 2021
- Mario Pavés – América – 1958–61
- Jorge Enrico Pavesi – Veracruz – 1945–49
- Nicolás Pavlovich – Morelia, Necaxa – 2007, 2010
- Mariano Pavone – Cruz Azul – 2012–14
- José Pedante – Leones Negros – 1993–94
- Cristian Pellerano – Tijuana, América, Morelia, Veracruz – 2012–14, 2015, 2015–16, 2017
- Hernán Pellerano – Tijuana – 2014
- José Manuel Peluffo – Morelia – 1982–83
- Gabriel Peñalba – Veracruz, Cruz Azul – 2015–16/2019, 2017
- Franco Peppino – Veracruz – 2007–08
- Sixto Peralta – Santos Laguna, Tigres – 2003–04, 2004–06
- Facundo Pereyra – San Luis, Necaxa – 2012–14, 2017
- Gabriel Pereyra – Cruz Azul, Atlante, Morelia, Puebla, Estudiantes – 2005–07, 2007–09, 2010, 2010–11, 2012
- Jorge Pereyra Díaz – León – 2017
- Claudio Pérez – Puebla – 2017
- Damián Pérez – Tijuana – 2016–18
- Omar Sebastián Pérez – Jaguares – 2005
- Miguel Perrichon – Oro, Irapuato, Necaxa – 1967–69, 1969–70, 1970–71
- Rolando Pierucci – Laguna, Santos Laguna, Puebla – 1975–76, 1976–77, 1977–78
- Daniel Pighín – Atlas – 1990–91
- **Gonzalo Piovi** – Cruz Azul – 2024–
- Matías Pisano – Tijuana – 2017
- Héctor Pitarch – Atlas – 1980–82
- Guido Pizarro – Tigres – 2013–17/2018–25
- Juan Antonio Pizzi – Toluca – 1990–91
- Jose Luis Pochettino – Cobras – 1990–91
- Edgardo Prátola – León – 1996–99
- Claudio Puechagut – Colibríes – 2003
- Ignacio Pussetto – Pumas – 2024–25
- Pablo Quatrocchi – Veracruz, Necaxa – 2004–06, 2007–11
- Mauro Quiroga – Necaxa, San Luis, Pachuca – 2019–20/2021, 2020, 2021
- **Aarón Quirós** – Atlante – 2026–
- Leonardo Ramos – Lobos BUAP, León, Pachuca – 2018–19, 2019–20, 2020
- **Santiago Ramos Mingo** – América – 2026–
- Santiago Raymonda – Veracruz – 2008
- Gerardo Reinoso – Correcaminos, León – 1993–94, 1994–95
- Alberto Rendo – Laguna – 1971–72
- Ezequiel Rescaldani – Puebla – 2015
- Rodrigo Rey – Pachuca – 2019
- Emanuel Reynoso – Tijuana – 2024–25
- Claudio Riaño – Necaxa – 2016–17/2018
- Arsenio Ribeca – Monterrey – 1980–83
- Walter Ribonetto – Gallos Blancos – 2004
- Emiliano Rigoni – León – 2025
- Martín Río – Querétaro – 2024
- Daniel Andrés Ríos – Veracruz, Toluca, Atlas – 2007, 2008–09, 2009
- Andrés Ríos – América, Leones Negros – 2014, 2014–15
- Gonzalo Ríos – León – 2015
- Marcelo Rúben Ríos – Santos Laguna, Cruz Azul – 1998, 1999
- Guillermo Rivarola – Pachuca, Santos Laguna, Monterrey – 1997/1999, 1998, 1999–01
- Guido Rodríguez – Tijuana, América – 2016–17, 2017–19
- Horacio Rodríguez – Tampico – 1981–82
- **Jorge Rodríguez** – Monterrey – 2024–
- Lucas Rodríguez – Veracruz – 2016–17
- Lucas Rodríguez – Tijuana, Querétaro – 2021–24, 2024–26
- Ariel Rojas – Cruz Azul – 2015–17
- Gabriel Rojas – Querétaro – 2022–23
- Roberto Rolando – Tampico – 1959–62
- Juan Romagnoli – Querétaro – 2022
- Leandro Romagnoli – Veracruz – 2005
- Martín Romagnoli – Toluca, Pumas – 2008–12, 2012–15
- Rubén Omar Romano – Gallos Blancos, Atlante, Cruz Azul, Veracruz – 1990–91, 1991–92/1994–95, 1992–93, 1993–94
- Braian Romero – Tijuana – 2023
- **Franco Romero** – Toluca – 2025–
- Lucas Romero – León – 2023
- **Luka Romero** – Cruz Azul – 2025–
- Mauricio Romero – Morelia, Atlante, Puebla, Sinaloa – 2007–2012, 2013–14, 2014–15, 2015
- Silvio Romero – Jaguares, América – 2015–16, 2016–17
- Ariel Rosada – Toluca – 2005–07
- Nicolás Roselli – Potosino – 1977–80
- Pablo Rotchen – Monterrey – 2002–05
- **Carlos Rotondi** – Cruz Azul – 2022–
- Marco Ruben – Tigres – 2014
- Silvio Rudman – Veracruz, Atlas, Toros Neza – 1992–93/1997, 1993–94, 1995–96
- Oscar Ruggeri – América – 1992–94
- Miguel Ángel Rugilo – León – 1945
- **Javier Ruiz** – Necaxa – 2026–
- Franco Russo – Querétaro – 2024–25
- Alejandro Sabella – Irapuato – 1988–89
- Lorenzo Sáez – Toluca, Pachuca, Monterrey, León – 1993–94, 1996–97, 1997, 1998–99
- Maximiliano Salas – Necaxa – 2019–22
- Roberto Salomone – León – 1971–77
- Eduardo Salvio – Pumas – 2022–24
- Rubens Sambueza – Pumas, Tecos, América, Toluca, León, Pachuca, San Luis – 2007–08, 2009–12, 2012–16, 2017–18/2020–21, 2019, 2019–20, 2022
- Ataúlfo Sánchez – América – 1961–67, 1968–70
- **Felipe Sánchez** – Santos Laguna – 2026–
- Nicolás Sánchez – Monterrey – 2017–21
- José Sand – Tijuana – 2011–12
- Jorge Santecchia – León – 1980–82
- José Santiago – América – 1953–54
- **Martín Sarrafiore** – Atlante – 2026–
- Nicolás Saucedo – Toluca – 2015–16
- Gastón Sauro – Toluca – 2019–21
- Luis Scatolaro – Irapuato, Necaxa – 1990–91, 1991–94
- Ángel Schandlein – América – 1959–60
- **Rodrigo Schlegel** – Atlas – 2026–
- Damián Schmidt – Puebla – 2016–17
- Juan Carlos Sconfianza – Toluca, Puebla – 1971–72, 1972–76
- Norberto Scoponi – Cruz Azul – 1994–97
- Dario Scotto – Necaxa – 1993–94
- Juan Pablo Segovia – Puebla, Necaxa – 2021–22, 2022–23
- Leonardo Sequeira – Querétaro – 2022
- José Tiburcio Serrizuela – Veracruz – 1991/1992–93
- Arnaldo Sialle – Irapuato – 1989–91
- **Santiago Simón** – Toluca – 2025–
- Darío Siviski – Toluca – 1984–85
- Augusto Solari – Atlas – 2023–24
- Esteban Solari – Pumas – 2007–08
- Jorge Solari – Torreón – 1971–72
- Santiago Solari – Atlante – 2009–10
- **Ramiro Sordo** – Santos Laguna – 2024–
- Gonzalo Sosa – Mazatlán – 2022
- Ismael Sosa – Pumas, Tigres, Pachuca, León – 2014–16, 2016–18, 2019/2020–21, 2019–20
- Lucas Sparapani – Jaguares – 2005
- Carlos Squeo – Jalisco – 1979–80
- Leonardo Suárez – América, Santos Laguna, Pumas – 2020–21/2023, 2022, 2024–25
- José Carlos Tabares – Necaxa – 2003–04
- Leonardo Tambussi – Dorados – 2005
- Aníbal Tarabini – Torreón – 1971–73
- Genaro Tedesco – Pumas – 1962–63
- Hugo Tedesco – Atlante – 1971–76
- Fernando Tobio – Toluca – 2018–19
- Gastón Togni – Pachuca – 2025
- Jonathan Torres – Querétaro – 2023
- Nicolás Torres – Atlante – 2010/2011/2012
- Marco Torsiglieri – Morelia – 2015–16
- Cristian Trapasso – Atlante, Toros Neza – 1993–94, 1995–96
- Cristian Traverso – Gallos Blancos, Puebla – 2002–03, 2003–04
- Octavio Trillini – América – 1958–59
- Enrique Triverio – Toluca, Querétaro – 2015–19/2020–21, 2019–20
- Cristian Trombetta – Jaguares – 2012–13
- Enzo Trossero – Toluca – 1985–86
- Franco Troyansky – Atlas – 2021–22
- Martín Ubaldi – Atlas, Tigres, Atlante, Puebla, Pumas – 1993–95, 1995–96, 1996–98, 1999–00, 2000
- Claudio Ubeda – Tampico Madero – 1994–95
- Leonardo Ulloa – Pachuca – 2018–19
- Carlos Uñate – América – 1958–59
- Ezequiel Unsain – Necaxa – 2023–26
- Agustín Urzi – Juárez – 2023
- Oscar Ustari – Atlas, Pachuca – 2016–17, 2020–23
- Héctor Uzal – América – 1953–54
- Lucas Valdemarín – San Luis – 2009
- Carlos Valenzuela – Tijuana, Querétaro – 2023–24, 2025
- **Milton Valenzuela** – Atlas – 2026–
- **Nicolás Vallejo** – León, Pachuca – 2026, 2026–
- Leonel Vangioni – Monterrey – 2017–20
- Bernardo Vargas – América – 1963–65
- Miguel Ángel Vargas – Santos Laguna – 1998
- Jorge Gabriel Vázquez – Morelia – 1996
- Juan Carlos Veiga – Zacatepec, Atlas – 1975–76/1980–82, 1977–78
- Héctor Veira – Laguna – 1971–72
- Julián Velázquez – Cruz Azul, Tijuana, Querétaro – 2016–18, 2018–19, 2020
- Leandro Velázquez – Veracruz – 2017
- Néstor Verderi – América, Potosino, Deportivo Neza – 1974–76, 1976–79, 1979–85
- Sergio Verdirame – Morelia, Monterrey, Cruz Azul, Santos Laguna – 1991–92, 1992–96/2002, 1996–97, 1997–98
- Avelino Verón – León – 1980–82
- Hernán Vigna – Necaxa, Puebla, Santos Laguna – 1999–00/2003, 2001, 2002
- Federico Vilar – Atlante, Morelia, Atlas, Tijuana – 2003–10, 2010–13, 2014–15, 2015–16
- Emanuel Villa – Atlas, Tecos, Cruz Azul, Pumas, Tigres, Querétaro – 2006, 2007, 2009–12, 2012, 2013–14, 2015–17
- Lucas Villafáñez – Morelia – 2019–20
- Facundo Villalba – Atlas – 1997–98
- Martín Villalonga – Toros Neza – 1994–96
- Daniel Villalva – Veracruz, Querétaro – 2014–18/2019, 2018–19
- José Luis Villarreal – Pachuca – 1997
- Pablo Vitti – Gallos Blancos – 2012
- Agustín Vuletich – Veracruz – 2016–17
- Axel Werner – San Luis – 2019–21
- Daniel Willington – Veracruz – 1970–71
- Javier Yacuzzi – Tijuana – 2011–12
- Damián Zamogilny – Puebla, Estudiantes, Atlas – 2007–08, 2008–11, 2012
- Julio Alberto Zamora – Cruz Azul – 1993–96
- Juan Manuel Zandoná – Veracruz – 1997
- Ariel Zárate – Toluca – 1996
- Sergio Zárate – Necaxa, América, Puebla – 1994–97/1998–99, 1997–98, 2000–01
- Hugo Zarich – Toluca – 1969–71
- Héctor Zelada – América, Atlante – 1979–87, 1988–90
- José Alfredo Zelaya – Atlante – 1999–00
- **Kevin Zenón** – Atlas – 2026–
- Cristián Zermatten – Pumas – 1998/1999–00

=== Bolivia ===
- Joaquín Botero – Pumas – 2003–06
- José Alfredo Castillo – Tecos – 2003–05/2011
- José Luis Chávez – Atlas – 2013
- Alejandro Chumacero – Puebla – 2018–20
- Milton Coimbra – Puebla – 2002–03
- Percy Colque – Tigres – 2001
- Luis Haquin – Puebla – 2019
- Fernando Ochoaizpur – Pumas – 1999–02
- Ronald Raldes – Cruz Azul – 2009
- Carlos Trucco – Pachuca, Cruz Azul – 1994–95, 1996–97

=== Brazil ===
- Abel Verônico – Atlas – 1972–76
- Adelino Batista da Silva Neto – León – 2000–01
- Adelson Portela – Pumas – 1962–63
- Adhemar Barcellos – Oro, Atlético Morelia – 1961–63, 1963–66
- Ademilson – Irapuato – 2003
- Aílton de Silva – Atlas, León, Pumas, San Luis – 2000, 2000–01, 2003–05/2007, 2006
- Alan Santos – Veracruz – 2018
- Alcindo – Jalisco, América – 1973, 1974–76
- Alemão – Cruz Azul – 2015
- Alemão – Pachuca – 2025
- Alexandre – Necaxa – 2004–05
- Alex Fernandes – Morelia, Monterrey – 1999–02, 2003–05/2007
- Allan Dellon – Gallos Blancos – 2003
- Almir – Gallos Blancos, Atlas – 2002, 2004
- Amaral – América, Leones Negros – 1981–85, 1987–88
- Amarildo Soares – Puebla, Celaya, Tecos – 1992–94, 1995–96, 1996
- Amauri Vital da Silva – León – 1977–80
- Amaury Epaminondas – Oro, Toluca – 1962–65, 1966–70
- Amaury Fonseca – Monterrey, Veracruz – 1962–63, 1963–65
- Anderson Leite – Juárez – 2022
- André Luiz Moreira – Jaguares – 2007–09
- Antonio Carlos Santos – América, Tigres, Veracruz, Santos Laguna, Morelia, Atlante – 1987–94, 1994–95, 1995–96, 1998, 1999, 1999
- Apodi – Querétaro – 2013–14
- Arlindo - América, Pachuca, Toluca - 1964-67, 1967-1969, 1969-70, 1970-71
- Ayres Moraes de Albuquerque - América - 1968-70
- Babá – Pumas – 1962–67
- Bacurau – Monterrey, Atlético Morelia – 1961–63, 1963–65
- Mário Baesso – América – 1968–69
- Bahía – Monterrey – 1990–92
- Bebeto – Toros Neza – 1999
- Bianchezi – Monterrey, Veracruz – 1992–95/1997, 1995–96
- Bianchini – Puebla – 1971–73
- Bruno Pirri – Jaguares – 2014–15/2016–17
- Bugre- Leones Negros – 1983–85
- Cabinho – Pumas, Atlante, León, Tigres – 1974–79, 1979–83, 1983–85, 1986–88
- Cabralzinho – Jalisco – 1972–74
- Camilo Sanvezzo – Querétaro, Tijuana, Mazatlán, Toluca – 2014–19/2023, 2019–20, 2020–21, 2022–23
- Candido – Pumas, Tecos, Campesinos, Toluca – 1975–77, 1977–79, 1980–81, 1981–82
- Canhoteiro – Deportivo Nacional, Toluca – 1964, 1965
- Carlito Peters – Oro, Pumas – 1960–61, 1961–64
- Carlos Alberto Seixas – América, Atlante, Gallos Blancos – 1988–89, 1989–90, 1991–94
- Carlos Augusto Gómes – Santos Laguna – 1999–02/2003
- Carlos Eloir Perucci – Laguna, Atlético Español, Cruz Azul – 1972–77, 1977–81, 1981–84
- Chico – Querétaro – 2020–21
- Christian Corrêa Dionisio – Pachuca – 2008
- Claudio da Silva Pinto – Tampico Madero, Monarcas Morelia, Toros Neza, Monterrey, Pachuca, Puebla, La Piedad, Celaya, Colibríes – 1994–95, 1997/1998–99, 1997, 1999–00, 2000/2003–04, 2001, 2001–02, 2002, 2003
- Cláudio Marques – Potosino – 1979–80
- Clay Cassius Silva – Leones Negros – 1991–93
- Cleomar – Morelia, Monterrey – 1997, 1998
- Coutinho – Atlas – 1970–71
- Custódio Alves – Atlas – 1961–63
- Dani Alves – Pumas – 2022–23
- Danilinho – Jaguares, Tigres, Querétaro – 2008–10/2016, 2011/2013–14, 2014–15
- Danilo Vergne – Atlas, Cruz Azul – 2005–06/2008, 2006
- Dario – Monterrey – 1968
- Denilson – Atlas – 2007
- Deraldo Márquez – Leones Negros – 1993–94
- Derley – León – 2014
- Derley – Jaguares – 2016–17
- Didi – Veracruz – 1965–66
- Didi – Toluca, Jalisco – 1976–78, 1978–79
- Diego – Toluca – 2019/2021–22
- Diogo – Pumas – 2021–23
- Dioney Carlos – Puebla, Tecos – 1992–94, 1994–95
- Dirceu – América – 1978–79
- Djalminha – América – 2004
- Dória – Santos Laguna, Atlas – 2018–24, 2024–25
- Domício – Pumas – 1962–63
- Dudu – Mazatlán – 2025–26
- Edcarlos – Cruz Azul – 2010
- Eder Pacheco – Morelia, Puebla – 2007–08, 2008–09
- Ederval Lourenço – Leones Negros – 1993–94
- Edmur Lucas – Tecos, Tigres, Tampico Madero – 1980–84, 1986–88, 1988–89
- Edno – Tigres – 2012
- Edson – Juárez – 2024
- Edú – América – 1989–92, 1994–95
- Edu – Tigres – 1977–83
- **Eduardo Bauermann** – Pachuca – 2025–
- Elías – Necaxa – 2005
- **Elias Manoel** – Tijuana – 2026–
- Eliomar Marcón – Tecos, Santos Laguna – 2003–06, 2006–07
- Elsinho – Juárez – 2019
- Euzébio – Leones Negros, Monterrey, León – 1975–82, 1982–83, 1983–85
- Everaldo – Querétaro – 2017–18
- Everaldo Batista "Vevé" – Monterrey, Oro – 1963–67/1969–70, 1968–69
- Everaldo Barbosa – Jaguares, Necaxa – 2004–06, 2007–11
- Everaldo Ferreira – Puebla – 2009
- Éverton – Tigres – 2010
- Everton Bilher – San Luis – 2012
- Fabiano Pereira – Necaxa, Puebla – 2004–08, 2008
- Fábio Gomes – Mazatlán – 2025–26
- Fábio Santos – Cruz Azul – 2015–16
- Fabrício – Veracruz – 2019
- Fantick – América – 2002–03
- Fernandinho – Juárez – 2021
- Flavio Barros – Necaxa – 2002
- Flavio Rogerio – Monterrey, Dorados, Tigres, Puebla – 2000–04, 2006, 2007–08, 2011
- Geraldo Dias – Monterrey – 1962–63
- Geraldo Furtado – León – 1979–82
- Gilberto Trindade "Albertino" – Atlético Morelia, Zacatepec – 1961–63/1966–67, 1963–66
- Giovanni Augusto – Mazatlán – 2021
- Giuliano Sabbatini – Pumas – 1997
- Glauco dos Santos – Leones Negros – 1993–94
- Alfredo Gottardi – Atlas, Veracruz – 1977–78, 1978–79
- Guarací Barbosa – Monterrey, Tigres, Veracruz – 1969–76, 1976–77, 1977–79
- **Guilherme Castilho** – Juárez – 2024–
- **Gustavo Ferrareis** – Puebla, Atlas – 2021–25, 2025–
- Hamilton – Pachuca – 1993
- **Helinho** – Toluca – 2024–
- Higor Meritão – Pumas – 2021–23
- Hugo Aparecido Matos – Leones Negros, Tigres, Tecos – 1990–93, 1993–94, 1994–95
- Humaitá – Monterrey – 1962–64
- Iarley – Dorados – 2004–05
- **Ícaro** – América – 2026–
- Irênio Soares – Tigres, América, San Luis, Veracruz – 2001–05, 2005–06, 2006–07, 2007
- Itamar Batista da Silva – Jaguares, Tigres – 2008–09, 2009–10
- Ivan Melo – Toluca – 1961–62
- Jajá – Veracruz – 1996–98
- Javán Marinho – León, Necaxa, Laguna, Monterrey – 1963–65, 1965–70, 1970–71, 1971–72
- João Batista – León, Pumas, Colibríes – 1999–00, 2001, 2003
- **João Lourenço** – San Luis – 2025–
- João Paulo – Leones Negros – 1983–84
- João Vanderlei Mior – Atlas, León – 1992–93, 1993–94
- Joãozinho – Morelia – 2008
- **Joaquim** – Tigres – 2024–
- John Kennedy – Pachuca – 2025
- José Santos Damasceno Filho (Tiba) – Pumas, Celaya, Atlante, Santos, Jaguares −1991-95, 1995–96 and 99–02, 1996–99, 2002, 2003–05
- Juary – Tecos – 1979–80
- Josiel da Rocha – Jaguares – 2009
- Juninho – Tigres – 2010–18
- Juninho – Tijuana – 2016
- **Juninho** – Pumas – 2026–
- Cardoso Júnior – León – 2008–09
- Júnior César – Santos Laguna – 2005
- Juracy Gaetan – CD Oro – 1960–1962
- **Kaiky Naves** – Necaxa – 2026–
- **Kenedy** – Pachuca – 2025–
- Keno – Atlas – 2015
- Kléber Pereira – Tigres, Veracruz, América, Necaxa – 2003–04, 2004, 2005–06, 2006–07
- Lalá – Atlas – 1961–63
- Leandro Alves – Puebla – 2005–06
- Leandro Carrijó – Juárez – 2019
- Leandro Machado – Gallos Blancos – 2003
- Leandro Rodrigues Tavares – Colibríes – 2003
- Lenilson Batista – Jaguares – 2007–08
- Léo Bonatini – San Luis – 2023–25
- Léo Coelho – San Luis – 2021–22
- Leonel Bolsonello – Pumas, Veracruz – 1992–94, 1994–95
- Levir Culpi – Atlante – 1979–80
- Liert Rosa – Zacatepec – 1961–62
- Lima – Jalisco – 1971–75
- Lima – América – 2026
- **Luan Garcia** – Toluca – 2024–
- **Lucas Camilo** – Puebla – 2026–
- **Lucas Esteves** – San Luis – 2026–
- Lucas Maia – Puebla – 2021–23
- Lucas Silva – Puebla, Toluca, Monterrey, Cruz Azul, Pachuca, Jaguares – 2011–12, 2012–13, 2013–15, 2015, 2016, 2017
- Lucas Xavier – Juárez – 2019
- Lucenilde Pereira – Jaguares – 2004
- Lúcio Flávio – Atlas – 2011
- Luisinho – América, Atlante, Tampico – 1976–79, 1979–81, 1981–82
- Luisinho Lemos - León - 1979-80
- Luiz Fumanchu – América – 1979–80
- Luis Moreira "Sauí" – Pumas – 1962–63
- **Madson** – Juárez – 2025–
- Maikon Leite – Atlas, Toluca – 2014, 2016
- Maizena – Toluca – 1999
- Maranhão – Cruz Azul – 2012–14
- Marcelinho – Necaxa – 2004
- Marcelo de Faria – América, Irapuato, San Luis – 1999–00, 2000–01, 2002–04
- Marcelo Fernandes – Tigres, Santos Laguna – 2001–02, 2002
- Marcelo Macedo – Atlas – 2005–06
- Marcinho – Morelia – 2007
- Marco Antonio de Almeida – Pumas, Pachuca – 1995–97, 1998
- Marcos Antonio García Nascimento – Gallos Blancos – 2006–07
- Marquinho – Puebla – 1996
- Marquinho – León – 1995–96
- Paulo Martorano – Oro – 1961
- Mateus Gonçalves – Pachuca, Jaguares, Toluca, Tijuana – 2016, 2017, 2017, 2018
- Matheus Ribeiro – Puebla – 2018
- Maurilio Thomas – Tigres – 2002
- Mauro Ramos – Toluca – 1967–68
- Milton Antonio Nunes – Puebla, Celaya – 1991–94, 1995–96
- Milton Cruz – Tecos – 1979–82
- Moisés – Cruz Azul – 2023
- Müller – Tecos, Tigres, Tampico Madero – 1979–86, 1986–88, 1989–90
- Muricy Ramalho – Puebla – 1979–84
- Murilo Neto – Jaguares – 2016
- **Nathan Silva** – Pumas – 2023–
- Neco – Oro – 1961–65
- Nenê Bonilha – Veracruz – 2019
- Ney Blanco - América, Atlas, Toluca, Laguna – 1962, 1962–67, 1967–68, 1969
- Nelson Fialho – Monterrey – 1965–70
- Nenê Belarmino – Leones Negros – 1974–82
- Nílton Batata – América – 1980–82
- Oreco – Toluca – 1968–69
- Osmar – Morelia – 2005
- Oswaldo Faria – América – 1978–81, Tampico 1981–82
- Ouraci – Pumas – 1962–63
- Parraro – Puebla – 1983–84
- Paulo Nagamura – Tigres – 2010
- Paulinho – Dorados – 2004
- Paulo Luiz Massariol – Leones Negros – 1984–85
- Paulo Rocha – Toros Neza, Celaya – 1993, 1995–96
- Paulo Valentim – Atlante – 1966–67
- **Paulo Victor** – Querétaro – 2026–
- Pedro da Cunha – Asturias – 1946–47
- Pedro Raul – Juárez, Toluca – 2021, 2023–24
- Peu – Monterrey – 1986
- Peu – Santos Laguna – 2014
- Picolé – Puebla, Deportivo Neza – 1979–81, 1981–82
- Rafael Carioca – Tigres – 2017–25
- Rafael Sóbis – Tigres – 2015–16
- Rafinha – Jaguares – 2016
- **Raphael Veiga** – América – 2026–
- Reinaldo Gueldini – Tampico Madero – 1988
- Reinaldo de Souza – Jaguares – 2004
- Renato Costa – Irapuato – 1967–69
- Ricardo Jesus – Querétaro, Tijuana – 2014, 2015
- Ricardo Wagner De Souza – Santos Laguna, Necaxa, León – 1993–97, 1997–98, 1999
- Richardson – León – 1999
- Robert de Pinho – Atlas, Monterrey, Tecos, América – 2004, 2008, 2008, 2009
- Roberto de Moura – Pumas – 1997–98
- **Robson Bambu** – San Luis – 2025–
- Robson Luiz – Morelia, Santos Laguna – 1999–00, 2000–01
- **Rodrigo Dourado** – San Luis, América, Juárez – 2022–25, 2026, 2026–
- Rodrigo Follé – Leones Negros – 2014
- Rogério – Pumas – 2021–22
- **Rômulo** – Tigres – 2025–
- Rômulo Marques Antoneli – Atlas – 2010
- Ronaldinho – Querétaro – 2014–15
- Rosinei – América – 2009–12
- Rubini – Nacional, Oro, Monterrey, Laguna – 1961–63, 1963–64, 1964–68, 1968–69
- Samir – Tigres, Mazatlán – 2022–24, 2025
- Sandro Coelho Leite – Pumas – 1992–94
- Sandro Sotilli – Necaxa, Jaguares – 2004–05, 2006
- Sebastião Pereira – Jaguares, Tigres, San Luis – 2004–05, 2005, 2006–07
- Sergio Lima – Jalisco, Atlas, Morelia, Unión de Curtidores – 1976–80, 1980–81, 1981–82, 1983–84
- Servílio – Atlas – 1970–71
- Ivo Sodré – América – 1968–69
- Spencer Coelho – Pumas, Tecos, Atlante, Toluca – 1975–77, 1977–78, 1978–81, 1982–82
- Tiago Volpi – Querétaro, Toluca – 2015–18, 2022–25
- Tita – León, Puebla – 1990–94/1995–96, 1994–95
- Toninho – América – 1970–73
- Tuca – Atlas, Pumas, Monterrey, Toluca – 1977–78, 1978–85/1990–91, 1986–87, 1987–90
- Ubirajara Chagas – Monterrey – 1967–75
- Uidemar – León – 1993–95
- Urubatão – América – 1961–62
- Val Baiano – Monterrey – 2010
- Valdir Papel – Dorados – 2005
- Vanderlei da Silva – Leones Negros – 1993–94
- Vavá – América – 1964–67
- Victor Ramos – Monterrey – 2014
- Vilázio – León – 1961–63
- Vilson Tadei – Monterrey – 1984–86
- Vitinho – San Luis, Tijuana – 2022–25, 2025
- Vladimir Rosas – América – 1995
- Wanderley Belém – León – 1961–62
- Wanderson – Morelia – 2007
- Washington Luigi Garucia – Indios – 2008
- William da Silva – Querétaro, América, Toluca – 2014–15, 2016–18, 2018–21
- Wilson Tiago – Morelia, Toluca, Veracruz, Jaguares, Querétaro, Sinaloa – 2005–09, 2012–14, 2014–15, 2015, 2015, 2016
- Yago – Lobos BUAP – 2018–19
- Yan Phillipe – San Luis – 2024–25
- Ygor Nogueira – Mazatlán – 2021–22
- Zague - América - 1961-69
- Zanata – Monterrey – 1978–81
- Zé Roberto – León – 1991–93
- Edson Zwaricz – Tecos, Monterrey, Dorados – 1993–95, 1998, 2005

=== Chile ===
- Joe Abrigo – Veracruz – 2018–19
- Sergio Ahumada – Tecos – 1974–75
- Marcelo Allende – Necaxa – 2018
- Cristián Álvarez – Jaguares – 2009–10
- Eduardo Arancibia – Atlas, León – 2000, 2001
- Esteban Aránguiz – San Luis – 1973–74
- Ángelo Araos – Necaxa, Puebla – 2022–23, 2025–26
- Jorge Aravena – Puebla – 1988–91
- Pedro Araya – San Luis, Atlas – 1971–73, 1973–78
- Francisco Arrué – Puebla – 2004
- Claudio Baeza – Necaxa, Toluca – 2019–20, 2021–24
- Rodrigo Barrera – Necaxa – 1995–96
- Bruno Barticciotto – Santos Laguna – 2025
- Marcelo Barticciotto – América – 1993–94
- Ivo Basay – Necaxa – 1991–94
- Jean Beausejour – América – 2009–10
- Luciano Cabral – León – 2024
- Pedro Campos – Necaxa – 2019
- Cristián Canío – Atlante – 2007
- Bryan Carrasco – Veracruz – 2018–19
- Juan Carreño – Pumas – 1994–95
- Roberto Cartes – San Luis – 2002–03
- Esteban Carvajal – Atlas – 2019
- Bryan Carvallo – Necaxa – 2018–19/2021
- Sandrino Castec – Cruz Azul – 1987–88
- Nicolás Castillo – Pumas, América, Necaxa – 2017–18, 2019–20, 2022
- Hernán Castro – Morelia – 1990–92
- Luis Castro – Atlético Potosino – 1987–88
- Osvaldo Castro – América, Jalisco, Deportivo Neza, Potosino, Pumas – 1972–75, 1975–79, 1979–81, 1981–82, 1983–84
- Matías Catalán – San Luis, Pachuca – 2019–20, 2021
- Juan Cornejo – León – 2017–18
- **Víctor Dávila** – Necaxa, Pachuca, León, América – 2017–18, 2019–20, 2021–23, 2024–
- Juan Delgado – Necaxa – 2019–21
- Isaac Díaz – Jaguares, Puebla – 2014–15, 2015
- Marcelo Díaz – Pumas – 2017–18
- **Nicolás Díaz** – Mazatlán, Tijuana – 2020–22/2025–, 2022–24
- Hugo Droguett – Tecos, Morelia, Cruz Azul – 2006–08, 2008–10, 2011
- **Rodrigo Echeverría** – León – 2025–
- Fabián Estay – Toluca, América, Atlante, Santos Laguna – 1995–99/2004, 1999–01, 2002–03, 2003
- Matías Fernández – Necaxa – 2017–19
- Marco Antonio Figueroa – Morelia, América, Celaya – 1986–90/1993–97, 1990–91, 1998
- Cristián Flores – Atlante, Irapuato – 2001, 2001
- Felipe Flores – Tijuana, Veracruz – 2015, 2017
- Edgardo Fuentes – León, Morelia – 1990–92, 1993–94
- Ismael Fuentes – Jaguares, Atlas – 2005–08/2010–, 2009
- Pablo Galdames – Cruz Azul, Veracruz – 2001–02/2003, 2002
- Felipe Gallegos – Necaxa, San Luis – 2016–19, 2020–21
- Miguel Ángel Gamboa – Tecos, América, Toros Neza – 1975–78, 1978–81, 1983–85
- Gamadiel García – Necaxa – 2003–04
- Lizardo Garrido – Santos Laguna – 1993
- Aníbal González – Morelia, Monterrey – 1992–93, 1993–94/1994–95
- Marcos González – Necaxa – 2016–17
- Osvaldo González – Toluca – 2010–11/2016–19
- Sebastián González – Atlante, Tigres, Veracruz, Tecos – 2002–05, 2006, 2007, 2008
- Fabián Guevara – Monterrey – 1994–96
- Juan Gutiérrez – Morelia, Toluca – 1990–91, 1992–94
- Roberto Gutiérrez – Estudiantes, Atlante – 2009–10, 2014
- Ángelo Henríquez – Atlas – 2018
- David Henríquez – Morelia – 2004–05
- Emilio Hernández – Cruz Azul – 2009
- Alejandro Hisis – Monterrey, Tigres – 1990–92, 1993–94
- Roberto Hodge – América, Tecos – 1970–74, 1974–77
- Valber Huerta – Toluca – 2022–24
- Enrique Iturra – Pachuca – 1973
- Manuel Iturra – Necaxa – 2016–17
- Gonzalo Jara – Morelia, Mazatlán, Tijuana – 2020, 2020, 2021
- Ignacio Jeraldino – Atlas, Santos Laguna – 2020, 2021–22
- Francisco Las Heras – Tecos – 1975–77
- Yerko Leiva – Necaxa – 2020–21
- Juan Carlos Letelier – Cruz Azul – 1990–91
- Igor Lichnovsky – Necaxa, Cruz Azul, Tigres, América – 2017–18, 2018–20, 2022–23, 2023–25
- Manuel López – Toluca, León – 1998, 2000
- Mario Maldonado – Tecos, Deportivo Neza – 1975–79, 1979–85
- Héctor Mancilla – Veracruz, Toluca, Tigres, Atlas, Morelia, Sinaloa – 2006–07, 2008–10, 2011–12/2016, 2012, 2013–14, 2015
- Rubén Martínez – Santos Laguna, Tampico Madero – 1993–94, 1994–95
- Nicolás Maturana – Necaxa – 2017
- Eugenio Méndez – Laguna – 1973
- Gabriel Mendoza – Tigres – 1997
- Fernando Meneses – Veracruz – 2015–16
- Jean Meneses – León, Toluca – 2018–22, 2022–24
- Rodrigo Millar – Atlas, Morelia, Mazatlán – 2013–15, 2015–20, 2020–21
- Cristián Montecinos – Santos Laguna, Necaxa, Puebla – 1996–97, 2000, 2000
- Joaquín Montecinos – Tijuana, Querétaro – 2022–23, 2024
- **Felipe Mora** – Cruz Azul, Pumas, San Luis – 2017–18, 2018–19, 2026–
- Iván Morales – Cruz Azul – 2022–23
- Gustavo Moscoso – Puebla, Morelia, Tigres – 1986–89, 1989–90, 1991–92
- Raúl Muñoz – San Luis – 2003
- Reinaldo Navia – Tecos, Morelia, América, Monterrey, San Luis, Atlas – 2001–02, 2003, 2004–05, 2006, 2006, 2007
- Manuel Neira – Jaguares – 2004
- Claudio Núñez – Tigres, Puebla – 1997–98/1999–01, 2002–03
- Juvenal Olmos – Irapuato – 1990–91
- Patricio Ormazábal – Dorados – 2005
- Andrés Oroz – Puebla – 2004
- Josué Ovalle – Mazatlán – 2026
- Esteban Paredes – Atlante, Querétaro – 2012–13, 2013–14
- Pablo Parra – Puebla – 2021–23
- Nelson Parraguez – Necaxa – 2001
- Esteban Pavez – Tijuana – 2021
- Luis Pavez – Juárez – 2021
- Eduardo Peralta San Luis, Potosino – 1972–74, 1974–76
- José Pérez – Gallos Blancos – 2012
- **Daniel Piña** – Juárez – 2026–
- Miguel Pinto – Atlas – 2011–13/2015
- Nelson Pinto – Tecos – 2005–08/2009/2011–12
- Carlos Poblete – Puebla, Ángeles, Cruz Azul, Veracruz – 1986–87/1988–92/1995–96, 1987–88, 1992–93, 1993–95
- Waldo Ponce – Cruz Azul – 2011–12
- Edson Puch – Necaxa, Pachuca, Querétaro – 2016–17, 2017, 2018
- Mariano Puyol – Cruz Azul – 1986–87
- Alberto Quintano – Cruz Azul – 1971–77
- Bryan Rabello – Santos Laguna, Pumas, Lobos BUAP – 2015–16, 2017, 2018–19
- Jaime Ramírez – Monarcas Morelia, Toros Neza – 1992–93, 1993–95
- Álvaro Ramos – León – 2017–18
- Carlos Reinoso – América – 1970–79
- Lorenzo Reyes – Atlas, Mazatlán – 2018–20, 2021
- Enzo Roco – Cruz Azul – 2016–18
- Juan Rodríguez – Atlético Español – 1973–78
- Martín Rodríguez – Cruz Azul, Pumas, Morelia, Mazatlán – 2017–18, 2018–19, 2020, 2020
- Juan Rojas – Potosino – 1988–89
- Manuel Rojas – América – 1975–76
- Ricardo Rojas – América, Necaxa – 2001–07/2009, 2007
- Bruno Romo – Juárez – 2020
- Eduardo Rubio – Cruz Azul – 2007
- Patricio Rubio – Querétaro – 2015/2016
- Rodrigo Ruiz – Puebla, Toros Neza, Santos Laguna, Tecos, Veracruz – 1994–96, 1996–99, 2000–06/2010–11, 2007/2008–10/2011–12, 2008
- Cristian Saavedra – Santos Laguna – 1988–89
- Ángelo Sagal – Pachuca, Juárez – 2017–19, 2019–20
- Omar Sandoval – Monterrey, Tecos – 1976–77, 1978–79
- Nelson Sanhueza – Monterrey, Potosino, Puebla, Correcaminos – 1977–79, 1980–82/1986–87, 1982–85, 1987–88
- Álvaro Sarabia – Jaguares – 2005
- José Luis Sierra – Tigres – 1999
- Francisco Silva – Jaguares, Cruz Azul – 2015–16, 2016–18
- Eduardo Soto – América – 1995
- Humberto Suazo – Monterrey – 2007–09/2010–14
- Christian Torres – León, América, Monterrey – 1995–97/2000, 1998, 1999
- Nelson Torres – Toluca – 1972–73
- Cristopher Toselli – Atlas – 2018
- Ariel Uribe – Morelia – 2019
- Diego Valdés – Morelia, Santos Laguna, América – 2016–18, 2019–21, 2022–25
- Jorge Valdivia – Morelia, Mazatlán, Necaxa – 2020, 2020, 2022
- Gino Valentini – Irapuato – 1988–89
- René Valenzuela – Ángeles – 1987–88
- Rodrigo Valenzuela – América, León, Atlas, Veracruz – 1998/2004–05, 2001–02, 2002–04, 2006
- Eduardo Vargas – Tigres – 2017–20
- **Sebastián Vegas** – Morelia, Monterrey, León – 2016–20, 2020–24, 2026–
- Juan Carlos Vera – Cruz Azul, Morelia, Tampico Madero, Pumas, Atlas – 1986–87, 1987–88, 1988–90, 1990–91/1992–93, 1991–92
- Sergio Vergara – Pachuca – 2017
- Mathías Vidangossy – Jaguares, Pumas – 2015, 2016
- Eduardo Vilches – Necaxa – 1994–99
- José Luis Villanueva – Morelia – 2006
- Richard Zambrano – Santos Laguna, Celaya, Pumas – 1993–95, 1995–96, 1998–99
- Iván Zamorano – América – 2001–02
- Dilan Zúñiga – León – 2019

=== Colombia ===
- Herly Alcázar – Jaguares – 2006
- Carlos Augusto Álvarez – Necaxa – 2001
- Diego Álvarez – San Luis – 2009
- Yulián Anchico – Pachuca – 2011
- Andrés Andrade – América, Jaguares, León, Atlas – 2013–14/2015–16, 2014–15, 2016–18, 2018–19
- **Álvaro Angulo** – Pumas – 2025–
- Brayan Angulo – Jaguares, Puebla, Tijuana, Toluca – 2016–17, 2017–20/2023–25, 2021–22, 2022–23
- Jeison Angulo – Pumas – 2019
- Carlos Arango – Morelia – 1959
- Cristian Arango – Pachuca – 2023
- **Daniel Arcila** – León – 2025–
- Luis Carlos Arias – Toluca – 2011
- Franco Arizala – Pachuca, Jaguares, León, Atlas, Puebla – 2010–11, 2011–13/2014–15/2017, 2013–14, 2015–16, 2016
- Yovanny Arrechea – León – 2013–
- Eudalio Arriaga – Puebla – 2003–05
- **Andrés Arroyo** – Pachuca – 2026–
- Miguel Asprilla – Santos Laguna – 1994–97
- Yuber Asprilla – Pumas – 2018
- Kevin Balanta – Tijuana, Querétaro, Santos Laguna – 2019–20/2023–25, 2021–23, 2025–26
- **Jaine Barreiro** – Atlas, Pachuca, León – 2016–18, 2018–19, 2020–
- Nicolás Benedetti – América, Mazatlán – 2019–21, 2022–25
- **Cristian Borja** – Toluca, América – 2018–19, 2024–
- **Miguel Borja** – América – 2026–
- Hernán Burbano – León, Tigres, Atlas – 2012–13/2015–18, 2013–15, 2019
- Andrés Cadavid – San Luis – 2012
- **Johan Caicedo** – San Luis – 2026–
- José Caicedo – Pumas – 2022–26
- Juan Caicedo – Santos Laguna – 2016
- **Juan José Calero** – Pachuca, León, Cruz Azul – 2015–17, 2018–19, 2026–
- Miguel Calero – Pachuca – 2000–11
- **Diber Cambindo** – Cruz Azul, Necaxa, León – 2023, 2024–25, 2026–
- Yerson Candelo – Querétaro – 2015–18
- Edwin Cardona – Monterrey, Pachuca, Tijuana – 2015–17, 2019, 2020
- Jown Cardona – León – 2019–20
- Kevin Castaño – Cruz Azul – 2023
- Fabián Castillo – Tijuana, Querétaro, Juárez – 2018–19/2020–21/2022–23, 2019–20, 2021–22
- Jairo Castillo – Gallos Blancos – 2011
- Alex Castro – Cruz Azul – 2020
- Carlos Castro – Necaxa – 2002
- Edwuin Cetré – Santos Laguna – 2018
- Yimmi Chará – Monterrey, Sinaloa – 2015/2016–17, 2016
- Andrés Chitiva – Pachuca, Indios, América, Atlas – 2001–08/2011, 2008, 2009, 2010
- Andrés Colorado – Necaxa – 2023–24
- Wilman Conde – Atlas – 2011
- Jonathan Copete – Pachuca – 2019–20
- Jhersson Córdoba – San Luis – 2013
- Jhon Córdoba – Jaguares – 2012–13
- Efraín Cortés – Gallos Blancos, Pachuca, Puebla – 2011–12, 2013–14, 2014–15
- Wilberto Cosme – Gallos Blancos, Chiapas, Puebla – 2013, 2014, 2014–15
- Jefferson Cuero – Morelia – 2015–17
- Mauricio Cuero – Santos Laguna, Tijuana, Atlas – 2016–17, 2017, 2019–20
- Gustavo Culma – Necaxa – 2018
- Cristian Dájome – Santos Laguna – 2025–26
- Ayron del Valle – Querétaro, Juárez – 2019, 2021
- Nelson Deossa – Pachuca, Monterrey – 2024, 2025
- **Willer Ditta** – Cruz Azul – 2023–
- **Bayron Duarte** – Querétaro – 2026–
- Jefferson Duque – Atlas, Morelia – 2015–16/2018, 2018
- Jhon Duque – San Luis – 2021
- **Óscar Estupiñán** – Juárez – 2024–
- Omar Fernández – Puebla, León – 2018–21/2022–23, 2021–22
- Delio Gamboa Rentería – Oro – 1959–60
- **Jordan García** – León – 2026–
- Martín García – Necaxa – 2007
- Faber Gil – Pachuca – 2024
- Juan Diego González – Santos Laguna – 2006
- **Edgar Guerra** – León, Puebla – 2024–25/2026–, 2025–26
- **Juan Guevara** – León – 2026–
- Wilder Guisao – Toluca – 2015
- Carlos Gutiérrez – Necaxa – 2002–03
- Teofilo Gutierrez – Cruz Azul – 2013
- René Higuita – Veracruz – 1997–98
- Fredy Hinestroza – Santos Laguna, Veracruz – 2016, 2017
- Marino Hinestroza – Pachuca – 2022–23
- Avilés Hurtado – Pachuca, Jaguares, Tijuana, Monterrey, Juárez – 2013/2014/2021–23, 2013–14/2015–16, 2016–17, 2017–21, 2023–25
- Andrés Ibargüen – América, Santos Laguna – 2018–20, 2021
- Leiton Jiménez – Jaguares, Veracruz, Tijuana, Atlas, Lobos BUAP – 2012–13, 2013–15/2019, 2015–16, 2016–18, 2019
- Eisner Iván Loboa – León, Puebla, Atlas, Morelia – 2012–14, 2014–15, 2015, 2016
- **Santiago Londoño** – León – 2026–
- Harold Lozano – América, Pachuca – 1995–96, 2003–04
- Jeison Lucumí – Querétaro – 2019–20
- Mauro Manotas – Tijuana, Atlas – 2021–22, 2022–23
- Daniel Mantilla – Necaxa – 2023
- Vladimir Marín – Toluca – 2009–10
- Cristian Marrugo – Pachuca, Veracruz, Puebla – 2013, 2013, 2017–18/2019–20
- Cristian Martínez – Veracruz – 2014/2016
- **Homer Martínez** – Juárez – 2025–
- Jackson Martínez – Jaguares – 2010–12
- Roger Martínez – América – 2018–23
- **Stefan Medina** – Monterrey, Pachuca – 2014–15/2017–, 2016–17
- Alexander Mejía – Monterrey, León – 2015, 2016–18
- Daley Mena – Gallos Blancos – 2011–12
- Yorleys Mena – Morelia – 2015
- Alexis Mendoza – Veracruz – 1997
- Stiven Mendoza – León – 2024–25
- Francisco Meza – Pumas, Tigres – 2016, 2017–21
- Félix Micolta – Jaguares, Puebla – 2017, 2017–18
- **Kevin Mier** – Cruz Azul – 2024–
- Mauricio Molina – Morelia – 2003–04
- Jhon Mondragón – Puebla – 2017
- Víctor Montaño – Toluca – 2015
- Neider Morantes – Atlante – 2000–01
- Wilson Morelo – Monterrey, Sinaloa, Pachuca – 2014, 2016, 2016
- Dayro Moreno – Tijuana – 2011–12/2014–16
- Leonardo Fabio Moreno – América, Celaya, Jaguares – 2000/2001, 2001, 2002
- Marlos Moreno – Santos Laguna – 2019
- Tressor Moreno – Necaxa, Veracruz, San Luis – 2005–06, 2006–07, 2007–10
- Yairo Moreno – León, Pachuca – 2018–21/2022–23, 2021–22
- Andrés Mosquera – León, Toluca – 2017–22, 2022–23
- Aquivaldo Mosquera – Pachuca, América, Jaguares – 2005–07/2014–16, 2009–14, 2017
- Dairon Mosquera – Pachuca – 2018
- Moisés Mosquera – Juárez – 2023–26
- Santiago Mosquera – Pachuca – 2021
- Jefferson Murillo – Veracruz – 2017–19
- **Jesús Murillo** – Juárez – 2025–
- Miguel Murillo – Veracruz – 2018
- Óscar Murillo – Pachuca – 2016–23
- Francisco Nájera – Gallos Blancos – 2006–07
- Andrés Orozco – Dorados, Morelia – 2004–06, 2006–07
- Michael Javier Ortega – Atlas – 2010–11
- Wilmer Ortegón – Atlante, Tecos, Jaguares – 2000, 2001–02, 2002
- José Ortíz – Morelia, Mazatlán – 2019–20, 2020–21
- Humberto Osorio – Tijuana – 2015
- Juan Otero – Santos Laguna, América – 2021–22, 2022
- Franky Oviedo – América, Puebla, Pachuca, Necaxa – 2000–04, 2004–05, 2005, 2006–07
- Dorlan Pabón – Monterrey – 2013/2014–21
- Jhon Pajoy – Pachuca, Puebla – 2014, 2014–15
- **Kevin Palacios** – Santos Laguna – 2025–
- William Palacios – Lobos BUAP – 2017
- Felipe Pardo – Toluca, Pachuca – 2019–20/2021, 2020–21
- Jairo Patiño – San Luis – 2008–09
- Edixon Perea – Cruz Azul – 2011–12
- Geisson Perea – Pachuca – 2022
- Luis Amaranto Perea – Cruz Azul – 2012–14
- Luis Carlos Perea – Toros Neza – 1994–95
- **Óscar Perea** – América – 2026–
- Alexis Pérez – Querétaro – 2017–19
- Juan David Pérez – Tijuana, Veracruz, Pachuca – 2016, 2016, 2018
- Harold Preciado – Santos Laguna – 2022–24
- Deinner Quiñones – Santos Laguna – 2018–19
- Luis Quiñones – Tigres, Pumas, Lobos BUAP, Toluca, Puebla, Pachuca – 2016–17/2019–24, 2016, 2017, 2018, 2024–25, 2025–26
- Darwin Quintero – Santos Laguna, América – 2009–14, 2015–18
- Aldo Leão Ramírez – Morelia, Atlas, Cruz Azul – 2008–14, 2014–15, 2016
- Michael Rangel – Mazatlán – 2021
- Andrés Rentería – Santos Laguna, Querétaro, Cruz Azul – 2013–16, 2016–17, 2018
- John Restrepo – Cruz Azul, Tigres, Veracruz – 2003–06, 2006–07, 2007–
- Luis Gabriel Rey – Atlante, Morelia, Pachuca, Jaguares, América, Puebla – 2003–04/2008–09, 2005–07/2009–11/2016–17, 2007–08, 2011–13, 2013–14, 2015,
- Juan Reyes Grueso – Tecos – 1995
- Duvier Riascos – Puebla, Tijuana, Pachuca, Morelia – 2011, 2012–13, 2013, 2014–15
- Richard Ríos – Mazatlán – 2021–22
- **Christian Rivera** – Tijuana, Querétaro, Pachuca – 2020–22/2023–25, 2023, 2026–
- Yamilson Rivera – León – 2014–15
- Hugo Rodallega – Monterrey, Atlas, Necaxa – 2006/2007, 2006, 2007–08
- Arley Rodríguez – Lobos BUAP – 2018
- Emerson Rodríguez – Santos Laguna – 2023
- James Rodríguez – León – 2025
- Joao Rodríguez – Necaxa – 2020
- Johan Rojas – Monterrey, Necaxa – 2024–25, 2025
- **Jhohan Romaña** – León – 2026–
- **Kevin Rosero** – Necaxa – 2024–
- Efraín Sánchez – Atlas – 1958–60
- Jorge Segura – Atlas – 2019
- Mauricio Serna – Puebla – 2002–03
- William Tesillo – León – 2018–24
- Edison Toloza – Morelia, Puebla – 2012, 2012
- **Juan Pablo Torres** – Necaxa – 2026–
- Macnelly Torres – San Luis – 2011
- Santiago Tréllez – San Luis, Morelia – 2012–13, 2013–14
- Fernando Uribe – Toluca – 2015–18
- Mateus Uribe – América – 2017–19
- Albeiro Usuriaga – Necaxa – 1995–96
- Rafael Valek – Oro, Irapuato – 1955–56, 1956–57
- Carlos Valencia – Jaguares – 2016
- **Juan Valencia** – Necaxa – 2026–
- Iván Valenciano – Veracruz, Morelia – 1997, 1998
- Diego Valoyes – Juárez – 2023–25
- Óscar Vanegas – Toluca – 2021–22
- **Camilo Vargas** – Atlas – 2019–
- Omar Vásquez – Querétaro – 2013
- **Kevin Velasco** – Puebla – 2023–
- Duván Vergara – Monterrey, Santos Laguna – 2021–23, 2023–24
- Edgar Zapata – Necaxa, Veracruz – 2006, 2007
- Juan Zapata – Atlas – 2023–24
- **Raúl Zúñiga** – Querétaro, Tijuana, América – 2023, 2024–25, 2025–

=== Ecuador ===
- Gabriel Achilier – Morelia – 2017–20
- Alex Aguinaga – Necaxa, Cruz Azul – 1989–03, 2003–04
- Jordy Alcívar – León – 2024
- Juan Anangonó – Leones Negros – 2015
- Bryan Angulo – Cruz Azul, Tijuana – 2019/2021–22, 2020
- José Angulo – Querétaro – 2022
- Julio Angulo – Tijuana – 2018
- Vinicio Angulo – León – 2019
- Billy Arce – Mazatlán – 2026
- Michael Arroyo – San Luis, Atlante, América – 2010–11, 2012/2014, 2014–17
- Nicolás Asencio – Tecos – 1999
- Jaime Ayoví – Toluca, Pachuca, Tijuana – 2011, 2011–12, 2014
- José Ayoví – Tijuana, Chiapas – 2015, 2016
- Walter Ayoví – Monterrey, Pachuca, Sinaloa – 2009–13/2016–17, 2013–15, 2015
- **Diogo Bagüí** – Tijuana – 2026–
- Manu Balda – Atlas – 2019–20
- Christian Benítez – Santos Laguna, América – 2007–09/2010–11, 2011–13
- Jonathan Betancourt – Querétaro – 2020
- Luis Bolaños – Atlas – 2012
- Miler Bolaños – Tijuana – 2017–20
- Félix Borja – Puebla, Pachuca – 2011/2013–14, 2011–12
- Jonathan Borja – Cruz Azul – 2020
- Geovanny Caicedo – Irapuato – 2001
- Jordy Caicedo – Tigres, Atlas – 2022, 2023–24
- Luis Caicedo – Veracruz – 2018–19
- Marcos Caicedo – León, Sinaloa – 2014–15, 2015
- Marcello Capirossi – Pumas, Pachuca, Santos Laguna – 1991-93, 1997–98
- Michael Carcelén – Querétaro – 2025–26
- Byron Castillo – León, Pachuca – 2022–23, 2023
- Erick Castillo – Tijuana, Santos Laguna, Juárez – 2018–19/2021, 2019–20, 2020–21
- Segundo Castillo – Pachuca, Puebla, Sinaloa – 2011–12, 2013, 2015–16
- Aníbal Chalá – Toluca, Atlas – 2019–20, 2021–23
- **Jairón Charcopa** – Atlante – 2026–
- Alex Colón – Pachuca – 2014
- Washington Corozo – Pumas – 2021–22
- Gabriel Cortez – Lobos BUAP – 2018
- Bryan de Jesús – Necaxa – 2018
- Marlon de Jesús – Monterrey, Puebla – 2013–14, 2014
- Agustín Delgado – Cruz Azul, Necaxa, Pumas – 1998, 1999–01, 2004
- Alexander Domínguez – Monterrey – 2016–17
- Rómulo Dudar Mina – Jalisco – 1975
- Giovanny Espinoza – Monterrey – 2001
- Michael Estrada – Toluca, Cruz Azul – 2020–21, 2022–23
- Ítalo Estupiñán Toluca, América, Querétaro, Puebla – 1974–77, 1978–79, 1980–82, 1982–83
- Carlos Garces Toluca – 1975
- Francisco Gómez Portocarrero – Irapuato – 2000–01
- Jonathan González – Leones Negros, León – 2015, 2015–16
- Juan Govea – Morelia – 2013–14
- Ariel Graziani – Veracruz, Morelia – 1998, 1998–99
- **Carlos Gruezo** – Santos Laguna – 2026–
- Jorge Guagua – Atlante – 2012
- Fernando Guerrero – Leones Negros – 2015
- Yeison Guerrero – Veracruz – 2019
- Joffre Guerrón – Tigres, Cruz Azul, Pumas – 2014–15, 2016, 2017
- Eduardo Hurtado – Correcaminos – 1994
- Iván Hurtado – Celaya, Tigres, La Piedad, Pachuca – 1995–98, 1999–01, 2001, 2004–05
- Renato Ibarra – América, Atlas, Tijuana – 2016–19/2021, 2020–21, 2022
- Romario Ibarra – Pachuca – 2019–23
- Jefferson Intriago – Juárez, Mazatlán – 2019–21, 2022–26
- Carlos Alberto Juárez – Santos Laguna – 1995–96
- Anderson Julio – San Luis – 2020–21
- **Jhojan Julio** – Tijuana, Querétaro, Atlante – 2025, 2025–26, 2026–
- Iván Kaviedes – Puebla – 2003
- Fernando León – San Luis – 2020/2022
- Fidel Martínez – Tijuana, Leones Negros, Pumas, Atlas, Querétaro – 2012–14/2021, 2014–15, 2015–16, 2017, 2022
- Ángel Mena – Cruz Azul, León, Pachuca – 2017–18, 2019–24, 2024
- Edison Méndez – Irapuato, Santos Laguna – 2004, 2004
- Kevin Mercado – Necaxa – 2019–21
- **Andrés Micolta** – Pachuca – 2024–
- Narciso Mina – América, Atlante – 2013, 2014
- Jefferson Montero – Morelia, Querétaro – 2012–14, 2021–22
- Carlos Morán – Toros Neza – 2001
- Jefferson Orejuela – Querétaro – 2020
- Cristian Penilla – Pachuca, Morelia – 2015, 2016–17
- Jonathan Perlaza – Querétaro – 2020–21/2023–25
- Joao Plata – Toluca – 2020–21
- Stiven Plaza – Mazatlán – 2024
- **Jackson Porozo** – Tijuana – 2025–
- **Adonis Preciado** – Querétaro, Tijuana – 2025, 2025–
- Ayrton Preciado – Santos Laguna, Querétaro – 2018–22, 2024
- Pedro Quiñónez – Santos Laguna – 2009
- David Quiroz – Atlante – 2013
- Jordan Rezabala – Tijuana – 2020
- Joao Rojas – Morelia, Cruz Azul – 2011–13, 2013–17
- Joao Rojas – Monterrey – 2022–23
- Luis Saritama – Tigres, América – 2006, 2007
- Jordan Sierra – Lobos BUAP, Querétaro, Tigres, Toluca, Juárez, Mazatlán – 2018, 2019/2023–24, 2020–21, 2022, 2023, 2024–26
- Júnior Sornoza – Pachuca, Tijuana – 2015, 2021
- Christian Suárez – Necaxa, Santos Laguna, Pachuca, Atlas, Sinaloa – 2011, 2011–2012, 2013, 2015, 2015
- Félix Torres– Santos Laguna – 2019–23
- Antonio Valencia – Querétaro – 2021
- Enner Valencia – Pachuca, Tigres – 2014/2025–26, 2017–20
- Willian Vargas – Mazatlán – 2024
- **Pedro Vite** – Pumas – 2025–
- Armando Wila – Puebla – 2012

=== Paraguay ===
- Danilo Aceval – Tigres – 2000–01
- Jorge Achucarro – Atlas – 2008–10
- Jorge Aguilar – Querétaro, Tijuana, Necaxa – 2020, 2020, 2021
- Pablo Aguilar – San Luis, Tijuana, América, Cruz Azul – 2009–10, 2012–13/2018, 2014–17, 2018–22
- **Adrián Alcaraz** – Pachuca – 2026–
- Guido Alvarenga – León – 2001–02
- Luis Amarilla – Mazatlán – 2023–25
- Blas Armoa – Juárez – 2020–21
- Erwin Ávalos – Santos Laguna, Toluca – 2005, 2007
- Adam Bareiro – Monterrey, San Luis – 2019, 2021
- Fredy Bareiro – Estudiantes – 2008–10/2012
- Néstor Bareiro – San Luis – 2009
- Sergio Bareiro – Necaxa – 2021
- Lucas Barrios – Atlas – 2007
- Édgar Benítez – Pachuca, Toluca, Querétaro – 2009–11, 2012–15, 2015–18
- Jorge Benítez – Cruz Azul, Monterrey – 2015–17, 2017–18
- Pedro Benítez – Tigres – 2008–09
- Rafael Bobadilla – Leones Negros – 1993–94
- Ariel Bogado – Atlas, Tigres – 2008, 2009
- Rodrigo Bogarín – Querétaro – 2025
- Carlos Bonet – Cruz Azul – 2007–09
- Hugo Brizuela – Pachuca – 2001–02
- Luis Caballero – Atlas – 2014–16
- Pablo Caballero – Pumas, Puebla – 2000, 2001–03
- Salvador Cabañas – Jaguares, América – 2003–06, 2006–10
- José Canale – Querétaro – 2024–25
- Marcos Candia – América – 1953–54
- Salustiano Candia – Veracruz, Atlante – 2008, 2014
- Adolfino Cañete – Cruz Azul – 1984–85
- Gustavo Cañete – América, Atlante, Veracruz – 1999, 1999–00, 2002
- Denis Caniza – Santos Laguna, Cruz Azul, Atlas – 2001–05, 2005–06/2007–08, 2006–07
- José Cardozo – Toluca – 1994–05
- Luis Cardozo – Morelia – 2014–15
- Herminio Céspedes – Cruz Azul, San Luis, Puebla – 1974–76, 1976–77, 1977–78
- Roberto Cino – Cruz Azul, Monterrey – 1981–82, 1982–83
- **Walter Clar** – Atlante – 2026–
- Josué Colmán – Mazatlán, Querétaro – 2022–24, 2025
- Nelson Cuevas – Pachuca, América, Puebla – 2005–06, 2006–07, 2011
- Paulo da Silva – Toluca, Pachuca – 2003–09/2013–17, 2012–13
- Sergio Díaz – América – 2020
- Félix de Jesús Díaz Núñez – Santos Laguna – 1988–89
- José Doldán – Necaxa, Querétaro – 2020, 2020–21
- Cecilio Domínguez – América, Santos Laguna – 2017–19, 2022–23
- Juan Escobar – Cruz Azul, Toluca – 2019–23, 2024
- Marcelo Estigarribia – Jaguares – 2017
- Jonathan Fabbro – Jaguares, Lobos BUAP – 2016–17, 2017
- Fernando Fernández – Tigres – 2016
- Sebastián Ferreira – Morelia – 2018–20
- Walter Fretes – Jaguares – 2007
- Ariel Gamarra – Puebla – 2025–26
- **Enzo Giménez** – Querétaro – 2026–
- Carlos González – Necaxa, Pumas, Tigres, Toluca, Tijuana – 2017–18, 2018–20, 2021–22, 2022–23, 2023–24
- **Diego González** – Atlas, Santos Laguna – 2025–26, 2026–
- Julio González – Necaxa – 2020–21
- Walter González – Pachuca, León – 2018, 2018–19
- Alfredo Haywood – Tecos – 1979–80
- Juan Iturbe – Tijuana, Pumas, Pachuca – 2017–18, 2018–19/2020–21, 2020
- Carlos Jara Saguier – Cruz Azul – 1975–83
- Apolinor Jiménez – Cruz Azul, Puebla, Monterrey – 1973–75, 1975–77, 1977–79
- Hugo Kiesse – América, Tecos, Atlas – 1975–78, 1978–85, 1986–87
- Adolfo Lazzarini – Cruz Azul – 1977–78
- Darío Lezcano – Juárez – 2019–23
- Dante López – Pumas – 2008–11/2014–16
- Manuel Maciel – Toluca – 2008
- Julio César Manzur – Pachuca – 2007–08
- Líder Mármol – Atlante – 2010–11
- Cris Martínez – Santos Laguna – 2018
- Emilio Damián Martínez – Santos Laguna – 2006
- Nicolás Martínez – Puebla – 2009
- Osvaldo Martínez – Monterrey, Atlante, América, Santos Laguna, Atlas, Puebla, Querétaro – 2009–11, 2011–12, 2013–16, 2017–18, 2019, 2020, 2021
- **Jesús Medina** – San Luis – 2026–
- Atilio Mellone – Oro – 1945–48
- William Mendieta – Juárez – 2020–21
- Alfredo Mendoza – Atlas – 1994–95
- Luis Miño – Jaguares – 2017
- Herminio Miranda – Puebla – 2012–13
- Luis Alberto Monzón – Cruz Azul – 1991–92/1993–94
- **Robert Morales** – Toluca, Pumas – 2023–25, 2026–
- Sergio Nichiporuk – Atlante – 1987–88
- Sebastián Olmedo – Puebla – 2023–25
- Celso Ortiz – Monterrey, Pachuca – 2016–23, 2023
- Richard Ortiz – Toluca – 2013–16
- Fernando Ovelar – Pachuca – 2023
- Hugo Ovelar – Santos Laguna – 1999–00
- Roberto Ovelar – Cruz Azul – 2009
- Juan Patiño – Jaguares – 2016–17
- Kevin Pereira – Juárez – 2023
- Iván Piris – Monterrey, León – 2016–17, 2017–18
- Gastón Puerari – Atlas – 2011
- Gustavo Ramírez – Pachuca – 2016
- Robin Ramírez – Pumas – 2013
- Jorge Rojas – Querétaro, Tijuana – 2019, 2019
- Rodrigo Rojas – Monterrey – 2014
- Sindulfo Rojas – Atlas – 1979–82
- Ángel Romero – Cruz Azul – 2022
- Romerito – Puebla – 1989–90
- **Lucas Romero** – Juárez – 2026–
- Luis Romero – Santos Laguna, Jaguares – 2000–03, 2003
- Cristian Riveros – Cruz Azul – 2007–10
- Rubén Ruiz Díaz – Monterrey, Puebla, Necaxa – 1992–98, 1999, 2003–04
- Santiago Salcedo – Jaguares – 2007
- Adriano Samaniego – Necaxa – 1986–88
- Braian Samudio – Toluca, Necaxa – 2021–22, 2023–24
- Juan Samudio – Gallos Blancos – 2007
- Miguel Samudio – América, Querétaro – 2015–17, 2018–19
- Baudelio Sanabria – Atlas – 1979–80
- **Sergio Sanabria** – Puebla – 2026–
- Richard Sánchez – América – 2019–25
- Roque Santa Cruz – Cruz Azul – 2015
- Pedro Sarabria – Jaguares – 2002–03
- Antony Silva – Puebla – 2021–23
- Silvio Torales – Pumas – 2015
- Aureliano Torres – Toluca – 2011–12
- Eligio Torres – Cruz Azul, Potosino, Santos Laguna – 1982–84, 1984–85/1986–89, 1989–90
- Bruno Váldez – América – 2016–22
- Diego Valdez – San Luis – 2019
- Pablo Velázquez – Toluca, Morelia, Necaxa – 2013–14, 2015–16, 2017
- Víctor Velázquez – Lobos BUAP, Juárez – 2019, 2019–21
- Eladio Vera – Cruz Azul, Tecos – 1971–77, 1977–79
- Enrique Vera – América, Atlas – 2008–09, 2010
- Darío Verón – Pumas – 2003–17
- Enrique Villalba – Tecos, Tampico – 1979–82, 1982–83
- Héctor Villalba – Tijuana – 2016
- Javier Villalba – Cruz Azul – 1982–83
- Julio César Yegros – Cruz Azul, Tecos – 1995–96/1997–99/2000, 1997
- Eladio Zárate – San Luis – 1971–72
- Pablo Zeballos – Cruz Azul – 2008–09

=== Peru ===
- Luis Abram – Cruz Azul – 2022
- Luis Advíncula – Tigres, Lobos BUAP – 2017, 2017–18
- Wilmer Aguirre – San Luis – 2010–12
- Pedro Aquino – Lobos BUAP, León, América, Santos Laguna – 2017–18, 2018–20, 2021–23, 2023–25
- Eugenio Arenaza – América, León, Toluca – 1950–51, -, –
- Edgar Astudillo – Tigres – 1980–81
- Irven Ávila – Lobos BUAP, Morelia – 2018, 2018–19
- Julio Ayllón – Moctezuma, Veracruz, León, Tampico – 1946–49, 1949–50, 1950–51, 1952–54
- Héctor Bailetti – Atlante, Zacatepec – 1975–76, 1976–77
- Álvaro Barco – Tampico Madero – 1994–95
- Gerónimo Barbadillo – Tigres – 1977–82
- Eddy Carazas – Tigres – 1998
- Carlos Carbonell – Atlas – 1974–75
- Wilder Cartagena – Veracruz – 2018
- Pedro Chinchay – Tigres – 1980–82
- Héctor Chumpitaz – Atlas – 1975–77
- Guillermo Correa – Torreón, Irapuato – 1969–71, 1971–72
- Christian Cueva – Toluca, Pachuca – 2015–16, 2020
- Martín Dallorso – Gallos Blancos, Tecos – 1993–94, 1994–96
- Raúl de Alva – América – 1953–54
- Beto da Silva – Lobos BUAP – 2019
- Guillermo del Valle – Atlas – 1950–51
- Alejandro Duarte – Lobos BUAP – 2019
- Alfonso Dulanto – Pumas – 1996–97
- Johan Fano – Atlante – 2010
- Edison Flores – Morelia, Atlas – 2018–19, 2022–23
- Pedro Gallese – Veracruz – 2016–18
- Carlos García Carrasco – Toluca, Laguna, Torreón – 1968–69, 1969–71, 1971
- Alexi Gómez – Atlas – 2018
- Grimaldo González – ADO, Veracruz, Tampico – 1946–47, 1947–49, 1952–54
- Ernesto Labarthe – Monterrey – 1980–81
- Rufino Lecca – Veracruz – 1944–46
- Hugo Lobatón – Torreón – 1968–70
- Claudio Lostaunau – Monterrey, Toluca, Laguna, Jalisco – 1960–65/1967–69, 1965–67, 1969–73, 1974–75
- Flavio Maestri – San Luis – 2002
- Eduardo Malásquez – Atlas – 1988–89
- Reimond Manco – Atlante – 2011
- Juan Carlos Mariño – Gallos Blancos – 2013
- Andrés Mendoza – Morelia, Atlante – 2008–09, 2012
- Juan José Muñante – Atlético Español, Pumas UNAM, Tampico – 1973–76, 1976–80, 1980–82
- Franco Navarro – Tecos – 1987–88
- Juan Carlos Oblitas – Veracruz – 1975–77
- Percy Olivares – Cruz Azul – 1997
- Santiago Ormeño – Puebla, León, Guadalajara, Juárez – 2018–21/2024, 2021–22, 2022, 2023
- Walter Ormeño – América, Zacatepec, Atlante, Morelia – 1957–59/1961–62, 1959–60, 1962–63, 1963–64
- Juan Pajuelo – Atlas – 2002
- Roberto Palacios – Puebla, Tecos, Morelia, Atlas – 1997, 1998–02, 2003/2004, 2003
- Jesús Peláez – Veracruz – 1966-72
- Constantino Perales – León – 1957–62
- Andy Polo – Morelia – 2017
- Tulio Quiñones – Orizaba, Veracruz, Necaxa – 1947–49, 1949–51, 1952–53
- Piero Quispe – Pumas – 2024–25
- Oswaldo Ramírez – Atlético Español – 1975–77
- Christian Ramos – Veracruz – 2018
- Juan Reynoso – Cruz Azul, Necaxa – 1994–02, 2002–04
- Raúl Ruidíaz – Morelia – 2016–18
- Joel Sánchez – Querétaro – 2018
- Ray Sandoval – Morelia – 2018–19
- Anderson Santamaría – Puebla, Atlas, Santos Laguna – 2018, 2019–24, 2024–25
- Iván Santillán – Veracruz – 2019
- Roberto Silva – San Luis – 2003
- Jorge Soto – San Luis – 2003
- José Soto – Puebla, Celaya – 1996–98, 1999–00
- Alonso Urdániga – Atlante – 1963–64
- Julio César Uribe – América, Tecos – 1987–88, 1989–91
- Carlos Valdivia – Veracruz – 1944–46
- Walter Vílchez – Cruz Azul, Puebla – 2007, 2007–09
- Julio Villanueva – Torreón – 1968–69
- Alfonso Yañez – Gallos Blancos – 1993–94
- Yoshimar Yotún – Cruz Azul – 2019–21

=== Uruguay ===
- **Diego Abreu** – Tijuana – 2026–
- Sebastián Abreu – Tecos, Cruz Azul, América, Dorados, Monterrey, San Luis, Tigres – 1999–00/2004, 2002–03, 2003, 2005–06, 2006, 2007, 2007
- Eduardo Acevedo – Tecos – 1987–90
- Alejandro Acosta – Puebla – 2009–11
- Luis Alberto Acosta – América – 1984–85
- Rafael Acosta – Veracruz – 2016–17
- Nilo Acuña – Monterrey – 1972–75
- Washington Aguerre – Querétaro – 2021–22
- Cono Aguiar – Veracruz – 1995–96
- Carlos Aguilera – Tecos – 1987–88
- **Rodrigo Aguirre** – Necaxa, Monterrey, América, Tigres – 2021–22, 2022–24, 2024–26, 2026–
- Matías Aguirregaray – Tijuana – 2017
- Nelson Alaguich – Atlas – 1984–85/1986–87
- Martín Alaniz – Morelia – 2014
- Nicolás Albarracín – Querétaro – 2020
- Juan Albín – Veracruz – 2015–18
- Gerardo Alcoba – Pumas, Santos Laguna – 2015–17, 2018
- Diego Alonso – Pumas – 2004–05
- Iván Alonso – Toluca – 2011–12
- Lucero Álvarez – Lobos BUAP – 2017–18
- Mario Andrés Álvarez – Indios – 2008
- Antonio Alzamendi – Tecos – 1983–84
- **César Araújo** – Tigres – 2026–
- Maximiliano Araújo – Puebla, Toluca – 2020–22, 2023–24
- Egidio Arévalo – Monterrey, San Luis, Tijuana, Tigres, Atlas, Jaguares, Veracruz – 2007–08, 2009, 2011–12, 2014, 2014–15, 2016, 2016, 2017
- Maximiliano Arias – Gallos Blancos – 2011–12
- Ramón Arias – Puebla – 2015–16
- Facundo Barceló – Atlas – 2019
- Facundo Batista – Necaxa, Querétaro – 2021–23, 2024
- Jorge Bava – Atlas – 2008
- Francisco Bertocchi – Monterrey – 1974–77
- Gustavo Biscayzacú – Veracruz, Atlante, Necaxa – 2004–06, 2006–07, 2008
- Joe Bizera – Atlante – 2013
- Sergio Blanco – América, San Luis, Dorados, Gallos Blancos, Necaxa – 2003, 2004, 2006, 2010, 2011
- Julián Bonifacino – Atlas – 1972–73
- Ricardo Brandon – Veracruz, Toluca, Potosino, Campesinos, Oaxtepec – 1975–78, 1978–80, 1980–81, 1981–82, 1982–83
- Matías Britos – León, Pumas, Querétaro – 2012–14, 2014–17, 2018–19
- Carlos Bueno – Gallos Blancos – 2011–12
- **Santiago Bueno** – América – 2026–
- Hugo Cabezas – Puebla – 1980–81
- Javier Cabrera – Toluca – 2018
- Jorge Cabrera – Gallos Blancos, Correcaminos – 1990–91, 1991–93
- Wilmar Cabrera – Necaxa – 1989–90
- Pablo Cáceres – Puebla – 2017
- **Sebastián Cáceres** – América – 2020–
- Washington Camacho – Tijuana – 2019
- José Cancela – Puebla – 2000–01
- Camilo Cándido – Cruz Azul – 2024
- Julio Canessa – Atlas, Tecos, Necaxa, León, Potosino, Atlante – 1979–81, 1981–82, 1982–83, 1983–84, 1984–85, 1987–88
- James Cantero – Correcaminos – 1995
- Alberto Cardaccio – Curtidores, Atlas, Puebla, Monterrey – 1975–77, 1977–78, 1978–79, 1979–82
- Mathías Cardaccio – Atlante, Sinaloa – 2010–11, 2016
- Gonzalo Carneiro – Cruz Azul – 2022–23
- Juan Ramón Carrasco – Tecos – 1982–83
- Juan Guillermo Castillo – Gallos Blancos – 2012–13
- Facundo Castro – Necaxa – 2018–19
- Manuel Castro – Juárez – 2024
- William Castro – Cruz Azul – 1990–91
- Gabriel Cedrés – América – 1997–98
- Pablo Ceppelini – Cruz Azul – 2020
- Diego Cháves – Gallos Blancos – 2009
- Gonzalo Choy González – Morelia, Monterrey – 2007–08, 2008
- Matías Cóccaro – Atlas – 2025
- Fabián Coito – Pachuca – 1996
- Leonel Conde – Atlético Morelia, Necaxa – 1961–62/1963–65, 1962–63
- Romeo Corbo – Monterrey – 1974–80
- Julio César Cortés – Atlante – 1973
- Enrique Cremonini – Atlante – 1968–71
- Juan Ramón Curbelo – Indios – 2008–10
- Eduardo de la Peña – Tecos – 1982–83
- Alfredo de los Santos – Cobras – 1986–87
- Lucas de los Santos – Puebla – 2023–24
- Jonathan dos Santos – Querétaro – 2021–22
- **Anderson Duarte** – Toluca, Mazatlán, San Luis – 2024, 2025, 2026–
- Robert Ergas – Pumas – 2023–25
- José Luís Esperanza – Atlas 1972–73
- **Thiago Espinosa** – América – 2026–
- Franco Fagúndez – Santos Laguna – 2024–25
- Rodolfo Falero – Atlas – 1998
- César Falletti – Tijuana – 2019–20
- Daniel Fascioli – Veracruz – 1996/1997
- Álvaro Fernández – Puebla – 2008
- **Gabriel Fernández** – Juárez, Pumas, Cruz Azul – 2021–23, 2023, 2024–
- Hugo Fernández – Puebla, Atlas – 1978–80, 1981
- Joaquín Fernández – Tijuana – 2025
- Leonardo Fernández – Toluca, Tigres UANL – 2020/2022–23, 2020–21
- **Martín Fernández** – Atlante – 2026–
- Sebastián Fernández – San Luis – 2012
- Silvio Fernández – Jaguares – 2003
- Ángel Ferreira – Atlas – 1972–73
- William Ferreira – Leones Negros – 2014
- Raúl Ferro – Gallos Blancos – 2011
- Mateo Figoli – Gallos Blancos, Puebla – 2006–07, 2007
- Nicolás Fonseca – León – 2025
- Fabricio Formiliano – Necaxa – 2021–23
- Julio Franco – Morelia, Tampico Madero – 1983–84, 1984–85
- Gonzalo Freitas – Mazatlán – 2021–22
- Roberto Gadea – Tigres, Atlas – 1975–79, 1979–80
- Rafael García – Morelia – 2015
- Walter Gargano – Monterrey – 2015–17
- Walter Gassire – Toluca, Campesinos, Atlético Español, Tampico Madero – 1974–80, 1980–81, 1981–82, 1982–83
- **Valentín Gauthier** – León – 2025–
- Eduardo Gerolami – Campesinos – 1980–82
- Héctor Giménez – San Luis, Necaxa, Indios – 2005, 2007–08, 2009–10
- Federico Gino – San Luis – 2021
- **Emiliano Gómez** – Puebla, Tigres UANL – 2024–26, 2026–
- Jorge Gonçálvez – Cruz Azul – 1992–93, 1995, 1997
- Álvaro González – Atlas – 2015–16
- Álvaro Fabián González – Pumas, Puebla – 2002–03, 2007–10
- Fabián González – Santos Laguna – 1991–92
- **Fernando Gorriarán** – Santos Laguna, Tigres – 2019–22, 2023–
- Uruguay Graffigna – Pachuca, Atlético Español – 1972–73, 1973–74
- Wilson Graniolatti – Santos Laguna, Gallos Blancos, Atlante – 1988–89, 1990–91, 1991–96
- Pablo Granoche – Toluca, Veracruz – 2005, 2006–07
- Diego Guastavino – Gallos Blancos – 2012/2014
- Marcelo Guerrero – San Luis – 2005–08
- Walter Guglielmone – Pachuca, Jaguares – 2004, 2005
- Emanuel Gularte – Puebla, Querétaro – 2020–23/2024–25, 2023–24
- Luis Heimen – Santos Laguna, Correcaminos – 1989–90, 1990–91
- Abel Hernández – San Luis – 2022
- Diego Hernández – León – 2024
- Nelson Hernández – Potosino – 1975–76
- Robert Herrera – Puebla, Pachuca – 2015–17, 2017–18
- **Santiago Homenchenko** – Pachuca, Querétaro – 2025, 2025–
- Juan Izquierdo – San Luis – 2021
- Gary Kagelmacher – León – 2022
- Jonathan Lacerda – Santos Laguna, Atlas, Puebla, Sinaloa, Juárez – 2010–11/2014, 2011, 2012/2013, 2015–16, 2019–20
- Miguel Larrosa – Atlas, Necaxa – 1996–97, 2003
- Gustavo León – América, Puebla, Campesinos, Tampico, Potosino, Ángeles – 1973–75, 1975–80, 1980–82, 1982–83, 1983–84, 1987–88
- Martín Ligüera – San Luis – 2005–06
- Hernán Rodrigo López – Pachuca, América – 2004, 2007–08
- Nicolás López – Tigres, León – 2020–23, 2023–24
- Pablo López – Toluca – 2020–21
- Brian Lozano – América, Santos Laguna, Atlas – 2016, 2017–20/2021–22, 2023
- Josemir Lujambio – Gallos Blancos – 2002–03
- Adrián Luna – Veracruz – 2016–19
- Emilio MacEachen – Necaxa – 2017
- Fernando Machado – Pumas, Celaya, San Luis – 1998, 2002, 2006
- Oribe Maciel – América, Curtidores – 1973–74, 1975–81
- Hugo Magallanes – Querétaro – 2020
- Alejandro Majewski – Monterrey, Veracruz – 1962–63, 1965–66
- Francisco Majewski – Atlante, Necaxa – 1961–63, 1963–70
- Walter Mantegazza – León, Tigres – 1974–77, 1977–79
- Luis Marotte – Atlético Morelia, Irapuato, Nacional, Pachuca – 1961–62/1963–65, 1962–63/1971-72, 1963–65, 1968–69
- Enzo Martínez – Querétaro, Pachuca – 2022, 2023
- Federico Martínez – León – 2022
- Roberto Matosas – Toluca – 1974–76
- Camilo Mayada – San Luis – 2019–21
- Nelson Sebastián Maz – Indios, León – 2008, 2012–14
- Alan Medina – León – 2024
- Leonardo Medina – Jaguares – 2006
- Pedro Medina – San Luis, Tampico, Potosino – 1976–77, 1977–78, 1978–79
- Santiago Mele – Monterrey – 2025–26
- **Bruno Méndez** – Toluca – 2024–
- Pablo Míguez – Puebla – 2016–17
- Carlos Miloc – Irapuato, Atlético Morelia, León – 1962–64/1967–68, 1964–67, 1968–69
- Gabriel Miranda – Santos Laguna, Atlante – 1993, 1995–96
- Gonzalo Montes – Querétaro – 2020–21
- Carlos María Morales – Toluca, Atlas, Tecos – 1995–97/1999–02, 2002–05, 2005
- Claudio Morena – Tecos, Pachuca – 1992–95, 1996
- Darío Muchotrigo – Tecos – 1996–97
- Gonzalo Nápoli – León – 2024
- Álvaro Navarro – Puebla – 2016–17
- Joaquín Noy – Juárez – 2019
- Carlos Núñez – Jaguares – 2016
- Richard Núñez – Cruz Azul, Pachuca, América – 2005/2006–07, 2006, 2008
- Christian Oliva – Juárez – 2023
- Bryan Olivera – Querétaro – 2021
- Maximiliano Olivera – Juárez – 2020–23
- Nicolás Olivera – Necaxa, Atlas, Puebla, América – 2006, 2007, 2008–09/2010, 2011
- **Agustín Oliveros** – Necaxa – 2021–
- Mario Orta – Morelia – 1990–91
- Sergio Órteman – Atlas, Gallos Blancos – 2006, 2010
- Santiago Ostolaza – Cruz Azul, Gallos Blancos – 1990–92, 1992
- Cristian Palacios – Puebla – 2018
- Marcelo Palau – Puebla, Cruz Azul – 2010, 2011
- Ignacio Pallas – Puebla – 2018–19
- Julio María Palleiro – Necaxa, Toluca, América – 1951–56/1958–59, 1956–57/1958–59, 1957–58/1960–61
- Juan Martín Parodi – Toros Neza – 1998–99
- Juan Carlos Paz – Toluca, Tigres – 1978–85, 1987–89
- Gonzalo Pelúa – Juárez – 2023
- Horacio Peralta – Puebla, Atlante – 2008, 2009
- **Federico Pereira** – Toluca – 2024–
- Hamilton Pereira – Morelia – 2014
- Maximiliano Perg – Toluca, Puebla, Querétaro – 2017–18, 2019–21, 2021–22
- Diego Perrone – Atlas – 2003
- Víctor Piríz – San Luis, Necaxa – 2007–08, 2009
- Franco Pizzichillo – Santos Laguna – 2022
- Vicente Poggi – Necaxa – 2021–23
- Gonzalo Porras – Toluca – 2012
- Gastón Puerari – Atlas – 2011
- Liber Quiñones – Veracruz – 2014
- Gerardo Rabadja – Puebla – 1995–98
- Martín Rabuñal – Juárez – 2020
- Yonatthan Rak – Tijuana – 2021–22
- Kevin Ramírez – Querétaro, Puebla – 2020–21, 2022–23
- Ronald Ramírez – San Luis – 2004
- Jonathan Ramis – Pumas – 2015
- Martín Rea – Querétaro – 2020–21
- Hebert Revetria – Tampico, Deportivo Neza, Tecos – 1979–81/1983–84, 1981–82, 1982–83
- Diego Riolfo – Necaxa – 2016–17
- **Ignacio Rivero** – Tijuana, Cruz Azul – 2018–20/2026–, 2020–25
- Octavio Rivero – Atlas, Santos Laguna – 2018, 2019–20
- Pedro Rocha – Deportivo Neza – 1979–80
- **Agustín Rodríguez** – Atlas – 2026–
- Braian Rodríguez – Pachuca – 2017
- **Brian Rodríguez** – América – 2022–
- Darío Rodríguez – Toluca – 1995–96
- Diego Rodríguez – Tijuana – 2018–19
- Felipe Rodríguez – Jaguares – 2016
- Gerardo Rodríguez – Atlas – 1979–80
- Guillermo Rodríguez – Atlas – 2005
- Jonathan Rodríguez – Santos Laguna, Cruz Azul, América – 2016–18, 2019–21, 2022–24
- Jorge Rodríguez – Jaguares – 2010–13
- Juan Pablo Rodríguez Conde – Indios, San Luis – 2009, 2010
- Martín Rodríguez – Atlante, Irapuato, Veracruz, San Luis – 1999, 2000–01, 2002–03, 2004
- Ribair Rodríguez – Santos Laguna – 2014
- Sebastián Rodríguez – Veracruz – 2019
- Valentín Rodríguez – Pachuca – 2024
- Lucas Rodríguez Trezza – Atlas – 2022
- Diego Rolán – Juárez – 2019–20/2021–22
- Adrián Romero – Gallos Blancos – 2009–11
- **Diego Rossi** – Monterrey – 2026–
- **Franco Rossi** – Toluca – 2026–
- Marcelo Rotti – Tampico Madero – 1989–90
- Ademar Saccone – Irapuato – 1960–63
- Gustavo Salgado – Atlas – 1989–92
- Juan Manuel Salgueiro – Necaxa, Toluca – 2007, 2014
- Juan Manuel Sanabria – San Luis – 2021–26
- Carlos Sánchez – Puebla, Monterrey – 2013–14, 2016–18
- Vicente Sánchez – Toluca, América – 2001–07, 2010–11
- Cecilio de los Santos – América, Tigres, Puebla – 1988–94, 1994–95, 1995–96
- Matías Santos – Veracruz – 2018
- Michael Santos – Juárez – 2023–24
- Adrián Sarkisian – Veracruz – 2002
- Roberto Scarone – América – 1943–45
- Andrés Scotti – Puebla – 2000
- Diego Seoane – Necaxa – 2000
- Robert Siboldi – Atlas, Cruz Azul, Puebla, Tigres – 1989–92, 1993–94, 1994–95, 1995–99
- Andrés Silva – América, León, San Luis – 1997/2000, 2001, 2002
- Gastón Silva – Puebla – 2022–24
- Sergio Silva – Torreón, Unión de Curtidores, San Luis, Tampico – 1972–73, 1974–75, 1976–77, 1977–78
- Hugo Silveira – Querétaro – 2020–21
- Maximiliano Silvera – Juárez, Necaxa – 2022, 2023
- Nicolás Sosa – León, Querétaro – 2020–21, 2021
- Sebastián Sosa – Morelia, Mazatlán, Pumas – 2017–20, 2020, 2023
- Sebastián Sosa – Querétaro – 2020
- Cristian Souza – Pachuca – 2020
- Pio Tabaré – Curtidores – 1975–76
- Christian Tabó – Atlas, Puebla, Cruz Azul, Pumas – 2015–17, 2018–21, 2022–23, 2023–24
- Sebastián Taborda – Pumas – 2003
- Richard Tavares – Monterrey, Puebla, Veracruz – 1991–94, 1995–96, 1997–98
- Marcelo Tejera – Tecos – 2003–04
- David Terans – Pachuca – 2023
- **Mathías Tomás** – Puebla – 2026–
- Franco Torgnascioli – Pachuca – 2020
- Jesús Trindade – Pachuca – 2022
- Lorenzo Unanue – Potosino, Toros Neza, Tecos – 1980–83, 1986–87, 1988–89; 1983–84; 1987–88
- Jonathan Urretaviscaya – Pachuca, Monterrey – 2015–17, 2018–19
- Gonzalo Vargas – Atlas – 2008–10
- Sergio Marcelo Vázquez – Necaxa, Tigres, Puebla – 1997–00, 2000–01, 2001–03
- Emiliano Velázquez – Juárez – 2022
- Diego Vera – Gallos Blancos – 2012–13
- Mauricio Victorino – Veracruz – 2006–07
- Nicolás Vigneri – Cruz Azul, Puebla – 2008, 2009
- Nicolás Vikonis – Puebla, Mazatlán – 2018–20, 2021–23
- Mauro Vila – Gallos Blancos – 2009–10
- **Federico Viñas** – América, León, Toluca – 2019–23, 2023–24, 2026–
- Tabaré Viudez – Necaxa – 2010
- Facundo Waller – Pumas, San Luis, Puebla – 2020–21, 2021–22, 2023–25
- José Zalazar – Tecos – 1986–87/1988–89
- Ismael Zabaleta – Asturias – 1943–44

=== Venezuela ===
- Juan Arango – Monterrey, Pachuca, Puebla, Tijuana – 2000–01, 2002–03, 2003–04, 2014–15
- Daniel Arismendi – Atlante – 2008
- Fernando Aristeguieta – Morelia, Mazatlan, Puebla – 2019–20, 2020–21, 2021–22
- Eduard Bello – Mazatlán – 2022–24
- Jhonder Cádiz – León, Pachuca – 2024–25, 2025–26
- Cristian Cásseres – Atlas – 2000
- Jhon Chancellor – Necaxa – 2023
- Jesús Gómez – Necaxa – 2016
- César González – San Luis – 2009–10
- Félix Hernández – Celaya – 1998–99
- **Luifer Hernández** – Puebla – 2026–
- Darwin Machís – Juárez – 2022–23
- Giancarlo Maldonado – Atlante, Atlas – 2007–09/2010–11, 2012
- Josef Martínez – Tijuana – 2026
- Jesús Meza – Atlas – 2011–12
- Jhon Murillo – San Luis, Atlas – 2022–23/2025, 2024
- Yohandry Orozco – Puebla – 2019
- Rómulo Otero – Cruz Azul – 2021–22
- **Salomón Rondón** – Pachuca – 2024–
- Samuel Sosa – Querétaro – 2024
- Yeferson Soteldo – Tigres – 2022
- **Javier Suárez** – San Luis, Cruz Azul – 2025, 2026–
- José Manuel Velázquez – Veracruz – 2017
- Oswaldo Vizcarrondo – América – 2012

== Notes ==
1. Born in Angola
2. Born in Argentina
3. Born in Belgium
4. Born in Brazil
5. Born in Costa Rica
6. Born in England
7. Born in Spain
8. Born in France
9. Born in Italy
10. Born in Mexico
11. Born in Mozambique (then Portuguese Mozambique)
12. Born in the Netherlands
13. Born in Portugal
14. Born in Senegal
15. Born in Serbia (then part of Socialist Federal Republic of Yugoslavia
16. Born in the United States
17. Capped for the Argentina national under-20 football team
18. Capped for the Belgium national under-19 football team
19. Capped for the Belgium national under-21 football team
20. Capped for the Brazil national under-17 football team
21. Capped for the Catalonia national football team
22. Capped for the England national under-16 football team
23. Capped for the England national under-17 football team
24. Capped for the England national under-18 football team
25. Capped for the England national under-21 football team
26. Capped for the Spain national under-21 football team
27. Capped for the France national under-20 football team
28. Capped for the Honduras national under-20 football team
29. Capped for the Mexico national football team
30. Capped for the Mexico national under-15 football team
31. Capped for the Mexico national under-17 football team
32. Capped for the Mexico national under-18 football team
33. Capped for the Mexico national under-20 football team
34. Capped for the Mexico national under-21 football team
35. Capped for the Mexico national under-22 football team
36. Capped for the Mexico national under-23 football team
37. Capped for the Netherlands national under-16 football team
38. Capped for the Netherlands national under-17 football team
39. Capped for the Netherlands national under-18 football team
40. Capped for the Netherlands national under-20 football team
41. Capped for the Netherlands national under-21 football team
42. Capped for the Portugal national under-18 football team
43. Capped for the Portugal national under-19 football team
44. Capped for the Serbia national under-19 football team
45. Capped for the Serbia national under-21 football team
46. Capped for the United States national football team
47. Capped for the United States national under-17 football team
48. Capped for the United States national under-18 football team
49. Capped for the United States national under-20 football team
50. Capped for the United States national under-23 football team
