= Cono Aguiar =

Uruguayan footballer (born 1968)

Personal information
- Full name: Jesús Cono Aguiar Moreira
- Date of birth: 19 July 1968 (age 58)
- Place of birth: Florida, Uruguay
- Height: 1.86 m (6 ft 1 in)
- Position: Defender

Youth career
- C.A. Candil de Florida (OFI) 1984-1989

Senior career*
| Years | Team | Apps | (Gls) |
| 1995–1996 | Veracruz | 23 | (1) |
| 1997 | C. NACIONAL de F. | | |
| 2000–2003 | C.A. Fénix | | |
| 2002 | → C.S.y D. Macará (loan) | | |
| 2004 | C.A. River Plate de Montevideo | | |
| 2004–2005 | LDU Portoviejo | | |
| 2010 | C. A. Florida | | |

International career
| 2003 | Uruguay | 3 | (0) |
- * Club domestic league appearances and goals

Jesús Cono Aguiar Moreira (born 19 July 1968 in Montevideo) is a retired Uruguayan footballer.

== Club career ==
In Uruguay he played for 4 clubs, Centro Atlético Fénix, Defensor Sporting Club, Club Nacional de Football and Club Atlético River Plate. He scored six goals, two from penalty kicks and one off a free kick, with Fénix. Aguiar also had a spell with Veracruz.

== International career ==
Aguiar made three appearances for the senior Uruguay national football team, all during 2003.
