= 1981 CR Flamengo season =

Flamengo
1981 season
- President: Antônio Augusto D. de Abranches
- Head coach: Modesto Bria (until 5 April); Dino Sani (8 April - 19 July); Paulo César Carpegiani (from 24 July)
- Stadium: Estádio do Maracanã
- Brazilian Série A: Quarter-finals
- Campeonato Carioca: Champions
- Copa Libertadores: Champions
- Intercontinental Cup: Champions
- Top goalscorer: League: Nunes (16); All: Nunes (45)
Home colours	Away colours

The 1981 football season is Clube de Regatas do Flamengo's 86th year of existence, their 70th football season, and their 69th season in the top division of the Campeonato Carioca, the Rio de Janeiro state football league. In addition, it is their 11th in the top division of the Brazilian national football league, having never been relegated from either. Internationally, Flamengo participated in the 1981 Copa Libertadores, qualifying through winning the 1980 Brazilian Série A Championship.

The 1981 season is regarded as the most successful and iconic season in Flamengo's history, in which they captured their first ever Copa Libertadores championship and defeated European Cup champions Liverpool by a score of 3 – 0 in the Intercontinental Cup in Tokyo, Japan. The team accomplished the feat of winning three trophies (the Copa Libertadores final, the Campeonato Carioca final, and the Intercontinental Cup) in a span of 21 days. This made Zico's Flamengo only the second Brazilian club to win a Mundial (world championship), after Pelé's Santos.

== Friendlies ==
=== National friendly ===
Flamengo played one pre-season match against São Paulo before the start of the national league season.

14 January 1981 Friendly	São Paulo	0 – 2	Flamengo	Morumbi, São Paulo
			Adílio; Nunes

=== Copa Punta del Este ===
The 1981 Copa Punta del Este was a friendly invitational tournament contested by Flamengo, Grêmio, Peñarol of Uruguay, and the Seleção of Maldonado, the state capital near Punta del Este, Uruguay. It was played in a single-elimination format with semi-finals and a final. Both Brazilian clubs eliminated the Uruguayan squads in the semi-finals in February 1981.

Following that, heavy rain in Uruguay and diminished interest from the organizers in a final without Peñarol delayed the final between Grêmio and Flamengo for nearly three months. It was ultimately played outside of Uruguay, at the Estádio Olímpico, in Porto Alegre. Scheduled to be played at 21:00, The match was further delayed an hour and a half due to a power outage. At nearly 1:00 the following morning the match was decided by coin toss: president Dunshee de Abranches selected 'heads' and the tournament was awarded to Flamengo.

26 February 1981 Semi-final	Peñarol (Uruguay)	0 – 3	(Brazil) Flamengo	Estadio Domingo Burgueño, Maldonado
			Anselmo; Lico; Peu

21 May 1981 Final	Grêmio (Brazil)	1 – 1 (7 – 7 p)	(Brazil) Flamengo	Estádio Olímpico Monumental, Porto Alegre
	de León 29'		Nunes 84'
Note: After the 7 – 7 draw in the penalty shootout, the match was decided in favor of Flamengo based on a coin toss by the referee.

=== Torneio João Havelange ===
The 1981 João Havelange Tournament was a three-team interstate friendly competition hosted by Democrata of Minas Gerais and named in honor of João Havelange, the Brazilian president of FIFA. Flamengo's state rivals Vasco da Gama won the tournament after defeating Democrata (3 - 2) and Flamengo (1 – 0).

At this time, Zico and Júnior of Flamengo were at Wembley Stadium representing the Seleção against England, with Zico scoring the lone goal in a 1 – 0 win.

10 May 1981 Friendly	Democrata	2 – 2 (4 – 3 p)	Flamengo	José Mammoud Abbas, Governador Valadares

17 May 1981 Friendly	Vasco da Gama	1 – 0	Flamengo	José Mammoud Abbas, Governador Valadares
		Report

=== Torneio Internacional de Nápoles ===
In the middle of their Carioca campaign, Zico and Flamengo traveled to Italy for a pair of friendlies in the Naples International Tournament. Flamengo, Avellino, and Northern Irish club Linfield were hosted by Napoli at the Stadio San Paolo. In front of a crowd of 80,000 Zico impressed against Ruud Krol and third-place Serie A team Napoli, scoring a hat trick. It would be the first time many Italians saw the Brazilian, before the 1982 World Cup in Spain and his eventual move to Udinense in 1983.

12 June 1981 Semi-final	Flamengo (Brazil)	5 – 1	(Italy) Avellino	Stadio San Paolo, Naples
	Baroninho (2); Adílio; Zico; Leandro

14 June 1981 Final	Flamengo (Brazil)	5 – 0	(Italy) Napoli	Stadio San Paolo, Naples
	Zico (3); Nunes; Adílio

=== Paulo César Carpegiani testimonial ===
During the Campeonato Carioca, and with one eye looking ahead to the Copa Libertadores semi-final stage in October, Flamengo scheduled a match with Argentine giants Boca Juniors and their rising superstar Diego Maradona. Both teams rested their starters in preceding matches before this friendly at the Maracanã in front of 65,000 and broadcast on live television. The "Taça da Raça" match served as a farewell to Flamengo midfielder Paulo César Carpegiani, who had already retired from play and was serving as Flamengo's manager (eventually leading the club to a first Libertadores title and world championship in a matter of months).

The two icons, Zico (28 years old) and Maradona (20), had not yet met on the field and fans were clamoring to watch the two face each other. Zico scored both goals of the match, and Maradona had a scoring chance at the end of the first half. The two would meet again representing their nations in the 1982 World Cup, with Zico scoring and Maradona being sent off.

15 September 1981 Friendly	Flamengo (Brazil)	2 – 0	(Argentina) Boca Juniors	Maracanã, Rio de Janeiro
	Zico 59', 74'			Attendance: 64,330

== Campeonato Brasileiro (Taça de Ouro) ==
Flamengo qualified for the 1981 Brazilian Championship (officially the Taça de Ouro or "Gold Cup") through finishing 3rd in the 1980 Campeonato Carioca. Grêmio were ultimately champions of the league with Flamengo finishing 6th overall out of 44 total participating teams.

=== First phase ===
Group D

Pos	Team	Pld	W	D	L	GF	GA	GD	Pts
1	(São Paulo (state)) Santos (A)	9	6	3	0	19	4	+15	15
2	(Rio de Janeiro (state)) Flamengo (A)	9	5	3	1	18	7	+11	13
3	(Pernambuco) Santa Cruz (A)	9	4	4	1	16	9	+7	12
4	(Amazonas (Brazilian state)) Nacional-AM (A)	9	4	3	2	7	6	+1	11
5	(Minas Gerais) Cruzeiro (A)	9	4	3	2	11	7	+4	11
6	(Pará) Paysandu (A)	9	3	2	4	12	12	0	8
7	(Ceará) Fortaleza (A)	9	2	3	4	9	16	−7	7
8	(Alagoas) CRB	9	2	2	5	11	16	−5	6
9	(Maranhão) Sampaio Corrêa	9	1	3	5	4	15	−11	5
10	(Sergipe) Itabaiana	9	1	0	8	4	19	−15	2

Source: FutebolNacional.com
(A) Advanced to second phase

18 January 1981 Matchday 1	Flamengo	0 – 0	Santos	Maracanã, Rio de Janeiro

21 January 1981 Matchday 2	Nacional-AM	0 – 1	Flamengo	Estádio Vivaldo Lima, Manaus
			Nunes

25 January 1981 Matchday 3	Paysandu	3 – 0	Flamengo	Mangueirão, Belém
	Evandro (2); Da Silva

28 January 1981 Matchday 4	Flamengo	2 – 0	Sampaio Corrêa	Maracanã, Rio de Janeiro
	Luiz Fumanchu (2)

1 February 1981 Matchday 5	Itabaiana	0 – 2	Flamengo	Estádio Lourival Baptista, Aracaju
			Peu; Nunes

4 February 1981 Matchday 6	Flamengo	8 – 0	Fortaleza	Maracanã, Rio de Janeiro
	Nunes (5); Peu (2); Vítor

7 February 1981 Matchday 7	Cruzeiro	0 – 0	Flamengo	Mineirão, Belo Horizonte

15 February 1981 Matchday 8	CRB	2 – 3	Flamengo	Rei Pelé, Maceió
	Joãozinho Paulista; Carlos Alberto (o.g.)		Nunes (2); Peu

21 February 1981 Matchday 9	Flamengo	2 – 2	Santa Cruz	Maracanã, Rio de Janeiro
	Nunes (2)		Joãozinho; Adílio (o.g.)

=== Second phase ===
Group L

Pos	Team	Pld	W	D	L	GF	GA	GD	Pts
1	(Rio de Janeiro (state)) Flamengo (A)	6	3	2	1	9	9	0	8
2	(Minas Gerais) Atlético Mineiro (A)	6	2	3	1	8	5	+3	7
3	(Paraná (state)) Colorado	6	1	3	2	8	7	+1	5
4	(Minas Gerais) Uberaba	6	0	4	2	5	9	−4	4

Source: FutebolNacional.com
(A) Advanced to round of 16

8 March 1981 Matchday 1	Flamengo	2 – 1	Atlético Mineiro	Maracanã, Rio de Janeiro
	Nunes; Adílio		Éder Aleixo

11 March 1981 Matchday 2	Uberaba	1 – 1	Flamengo	Estádio João Guido, Uberaba
	Serginho		Nunes

15 March 1981 Matchday 3	Colorado	4 – 0	Flamengo	Estádio Couto Pereira, Curitiba
	Jorge Nobre (2); Ditão

25 March 1981 Matchday 4	Atlético Mineiro	0 – 0	Flamengo	Mineirão, Belo Horizonte

1 April 1981 Matchday 5	Flamengo	4 – 2	Uberaba	Maracanã, Rio de Janeiro
	Tita (2); Nunes; Marinho		Paulo Luciano; Serginho

5 April 1981 Matchday 6	Flamengo	2 – 1	Colorado	Maracanã, Rio de Janeiro
	Zico (2)		Aladim

=== Round of 16 ===
8 April 1981 First leg	Bahia	0 – 0	Flamengo	Estádio Fonte Nova, Salvador

11 April 1981 Second leg	Flamengo	2 – 0 (2 – 0 agg.)	Bahia	Maracanã, Rio de Janeiro
	Nunes (2)

=== Quarterfinals ===
16 April 1981 First leg	Flamengo	0 – 0	Botafogo	Maracanã, Rio de Janeiro

19 April 1981 Second leg	Botafogo	3 – 1 (3 – 1 agg.)	Flamengo	Maracanã, Rio de Janeiro
	Mendonça (2); Jérson		Zico

== Campeonato Carioca ==
The important Rio de Janeiro state league schedule coincided with Flamengo's Copa Libertadores matches of the same year. Paulo César Carpegiani was a player and occasional starter for Flamengo in the first round of the Carioca, also serving as Dino Sani's assistant and eventually taking over as manager for the Carioca second round.

After finishing top in the first round Taça Guanabara and qualifying for the final, Flamengo turned their focus to the Libertadores group stage during the second round, which Vasco da Gama went on to win. In the third round, Flamengo's 6 – 0 thrashing of rival Botafogo was historic, and avenged their match in 1972 with the reverse scoreline. Flamengo captured the third round with their most wins, and the most goals scored and best goal differential of the competition.

Flamengo entered the final against Vasco with two rounds won (compared to Vasco's one round) and the most overall points across the three rounds. At a single match final in the Maracanã, a draw would be sufficient for Flamengo to become state champions. If Flamengo lost, a rematch would be a played and a draw would again give the title to Flamengo. A loss would force a third and final match.

Days before the final, tragedy struck Flamengo as former manager Cláudio Coutinho died while scuba diving the Ilhas Cagarras archipelago near Rio de Janeiro. Vasco were victorious in the match, 2 – 0, both goals scored by Roberto Dinamite. In the second match, Flamengo supporters cite rainy weather as the reason for their team's poor performance, losing again to Vasco by a final-minute goal from Dinamite.

On December 6, Flamengo won the decisive match with first half goals from Adílio and Nunes. Ticão scored for Vasco late in the second half, and as the team attempted to mount a comeback and force extra time, a Flamengo-supporter bricklayer invaded the pitch and started a confrontation with a Vasco player. Play was stopped for eight minutes as Nunes separated the bricklayer. Flamengo held on to win and earn their 21st Rio de Janeiro state championship.

=== First round (Taça Guanabara) ===
Pos	Team	Pld	W	D	L	GF	GA	GD	Pts	Qualification or relegation
1	Flamengo	11	7	3	1	26	8	+18	17	Qualified to Final phase
2	América	11	6	4	1	12	4	+8	16	
3	Botafogo	11	4	7	0	10	5	+5	15	
4	Vasco da Gama	11	6	2	3	19	10	+9	14	
5	Bangu	11	2	8	1	12	12	0	12	
6	Campo Grande	11	4	3	4	16	17	−1	11	
7	Americano	11	2	6	3	9	16	−7	10	
8	Fluminense	11	2	5	4	12	18	−6	9	
9	Volta Redonda	11	2	4	5	13	18	−5	8	
10	Serrano	11	2	3	6	10	14	−4	7	
11	Olaria	11	2	3	6	7	12	−5	7	
12	Madureira	11	2	2	7	10	22	−12	6	

Updated to match(es) played on July 12, 1981. Source: RSSSF.com
Rules for classification: 1) points; 2) wins; 3) goal difference; 4) number of goals scored.

23 May 1981 Matchday 1	Serrano	0 – 2	Flamengo	Estádio Atílio Marotti, Petrópolis
			Zico 38' (pen.); Júnior 83'	Attendance: 8,704; Referee: Wilson Carlos dos Santos

28 May 1981 Matchday 2	Flamengo	4 – 2	Madureira	Maracanã, Rio de Janeiro
	Baroninho 18'; Nunes 24', 58', 72'		Antônio Carlos 35'; Wilson 42'	Attendance: 3,489; Referee: Luis Carlos Felix

31 May 1981 Matchday 3	Flamengo	1 – 1	Bangu	Maracanã, Rio de Janeiro
	Nunes 29'		Rubens Feijão 58'	Attendance: 15,768; Referee: Aluisio Felisberto

3 June 1981 Matchday 4	Flamengo	7 – 0	Americano	Maracanã, Rio de Janeiro
	Nunes 39', 83', 85'; Chiquinho 48'; Baroninho 64'; Peu 67'; Andrade 74'			Attendance: 7,574; Referee: Mario Rui de Sousa

7 June 1981 Matchday 5	Flamengo	1 – 0	Vasco da Gama	Maracanã, Rio de Janeiro
	Zico 23'			Attendance: 46,552; Referee: Valquir Pimentel

18 June 1981 Matchday 6	Flamengo	0 – 0	America	Maracanã, Rio de Janeiro
				Attendance: 35,089; Referee: Luis Carlos Felix

21 June 1981 Matchday 7	Campo Grande	2 – 5	Flamengo	Estádio Ítalo del Cima, Rio de Janeiro
	Luisinho 51'; Pingo 89'		Zico 4', 9'; Nunes 13', 54'; Rondinelli 81'	Attendance: 10,339; Referee: Wilson Carlos dos Santos

24 June 1981 Matchday 8	Flamengo	2 – 1	Volta Redonda	Maracanã, Rio de Janeiro
	Nunes 38'; Zico 78'		Betinho 72'	Attendance: 11,819; Referee: Luis Carlos Felix

28 June 1981 Matchday 9	Fluminense	2 – 1	Flamengo	Maracanã, Rio de Janeiro
	Zeze 23', 49'		Zico 25'	Attendance: 46,030; Referee: Valquir Pimentel

7 July 1981 Matchday 10	Olaria	0 – 3	Flamengo	Estádio da Rua Bariri, Rio de Janeiro
	Pino (red card)		Zico 24', 63'; Ronaldo 64'	Attendance: 10,314; Referee: Aluisio Felisberto da Silva

12 July 1981 Matchday 11	Flamengo	0 – 0	Botafogo	Maracanã, Rio de Janeiro
			Gaúcho Lima (red card) 88'	Attendance: 45,909; Referee: Luis Carlos Felix

=== Second round (Taça Ney Cidade Palmeiro) ===
Pos	Team	Pld	W	D	L	GF	GA	GD	Pts	Qualification or relegation
1	Vasco da Gama	11	9	2	0	26	8	+18	20	Qualified to Final phase
2	Flamengo	11	7	3	1	21	6	+15	17	
3	Botafogo	11	7	3	1	17	6	+11	17	
4	Bangu	11	6	2	3	13	12	+1	14	
5	Fluminense	11	6	1	4	18	15	+3	13	
6	América	11	5	3	3	14	11	+3	13	
7	Campo Grande	11	5	2	4	12	11	+1	12	
8	Volta Redonda	11	1	5	5	12	19	−7	7	
9	Serrano	11	1	4	6	7	13	−6	6	
10	Olaria	11	1	3	7	6	18	−12	5	
11	Americano	11	1	2	8	9	18	−9	4	
12	Madureira	11	0	4	7	4	22	−18	4	

Updated to match(es) played on September 27, 1981. Source: RSSSF.com
Rules for classification: 1) points; 2) wins; 3) goal difference; 4) number of goals scored.

19 July 1981 Matchday 1	Flamengo	2 – 0	Serrano	Maracanã, Rio de Janeiro
	Zico 32'; Renato 65' (o.g.)			Attendance: 12,680; Referee: Élson Pessoa

2 August 1981 Matchday 2	Volta Redonda	1 – 1	Flamengo	Raulino de Oliveira, Volta Redonda
	Eli Mendes 66'		Zico 78'	Attendance: 15,235; Referee: Luis Carlos Felix

23 August 1981 Matchday 3	America	1 – 3	Flamengo	Maracanã, Rio de Janeiro
	Luisinho 87' (pen.)		Zico 44' (pen.); Júnior 67'; Tita 80'	Attendance: 26,579; Referee: Wilson Carlos dos Santos

30 August 1981 Matchday 4	Bangu	0 – 4	Flamengo	Estádio Moça Bonita, Rio de Janeiro
			Baroninho 15'; Zico 54'; Nunes 83'; Tita 85'	Attendance: 10,330; Referee: Valquir Pimentel

2 September 1981 Matchday 5	Flamengo	3 – 0	Campo Grande	Maracanã, Rio de Janeiro
	Zico 19', 69'; Tita 63'			Attendance: 10,912; Referee: Aluisio Felisberto

7 September 1981 Matchday 6	Fluminense	1 – 1	Flamengo	Maracanã, Rio de Janeiro
	Cláudio Adão 32'		Nunes 8'	Attendance: 76,024; Referee: Valquir Pimentel

10 September 1981 Matchday 7	Madureira	0 – 1	Flamengo	Estádio Caio Martins, Niterói
			Nunes 33'	Attendance: 10,458; Referee: Giese do Couto

13 September 1981 Matchday 8	Americano	0 – 1	Flamengo	Estádio Godofredo Cruz, Campos
			Adílio 24'	Attendance: 12,640; Referee: Valquir Pimentel

17 September 1981 Matchday 9	Flamengo	3 – 0	Olaria	Maracanã, Rio de Janeiro
	Mozer 15'; Adílio 57'; Nunes 89'			Attendance: 4,954; Referee: José Carlos Moura

20 September 1981 Matchday 10	Vasco da Gama	1 – 1	Flamengo	Maracanã, Rio de Janeiro
	Wilsinho 31'		Zico 48'	Attendance: 84,122; Referee: Wilson Carlos dos Santos

26 September 1981 Matchday 11	Botafogo	2 – 1	Flamengo	Maracanã, Rio de Janeiro
	Marcelo 4'; Ademir Lobo 69'		Nunes 54'	Attendance: 25,390; Referee: Luis Carlos Felix

=== Third round (Taça Sylvio Corrêa Pacheco) ===
Pos	Team	Pld	W	D	L	GF	GA	GD	Pts	Qualification or relegation
1	Flamengo	10	8	2	0	34	5	+29	18 (Note: The November 22 match between Vasco and Flamengo wasn't held)	Qualified to Final phase
2	Vasco da Gama	10	6	3	1	20	10	+10	15	
3	Fluminense	11	6	2	3	23	15	+8	14	
4	Botafogo	11	6	2	3	17	13	+4	14	
5	Bangu	11	4	4	3	12	9	+3	12	
6	Americano	11	5	1	5	11	19	−8	11	
7	Madureira	11	4	3	4	9	16	−7	11	
8	Volta Redonda	11	3	4	4	13	17	−4	10	
9	Campo Grande	11	3	3	5	6	11	−5	9	
10	Serrano	11	2	3	6	9	15	−6	7	
11	América	11	2	3	6	8	18	−10	7	
12	Olaria	11	1	0	10	5	18	−13	2	

Updated to match(es) played on November 26, 1981. Source: RSSSF.com
Rules for classification: 1) points; 2) wins; 3) goal difference; 4) number of goals scored.
Notes:

7 October 1981 Matchday 1	Flamengo	4 – 0	Olaria	Maracanã, Rio de Janeiro
	Zico 19'; Adílio 27'; Júnior 33'; Baroninho 84'			Attendance: 6,022; Referee: Cláudio Garcia

10 October 1981 Matchday 2	Madureira	0 – 3	Flamengo	Estádio Caio Martins, Niterói
			Zico 13', 34'; Mozer 41'	Attendance: 8,147; Referee: Valquir Pimentel

18 October 1981 Matchday 3	Flamengo	0 – 0	Bangu	Maracanã, Rio de Janeiro
				Attendance: 25,620; Referee: Pedro Paulo Bregalda

25 October 1981 Matchday 4	Campo Grande	1 – 2	Flamengo	Estádio Ítalo del Cima, Rio de Janeiro
	Marinho 24' (o.g.)		Tita 75'; Lico 86'	Attendance: 6,588; Referee: José Muniz Brandao

2 November 1981 Matchday 5	Flamengo	4 – 0	America	Maracanã, Rio de Janeiro
	Zico 10', 77', 88'; Zé Paulo 57' (o.g.)			Attendance: 29,530; Referee: Angelo Antônio Ferrari

5 November 1981 Matchday 6	Serrano	1 – 1	Flamengo	Estádio Atílio Marotti, Petrópolis
	Gilberto 11'		Zico 54'	Attendance: 9,545; Referee: Alvimar Gaspar dos Reis

8 November 1981 Matchday 7	Flamengo	6 – 0	Botafogo	Maracanã, Rio de Janeiro
	Nunes 7'; Zico 27', 75' (pen.); Lico 33'; Adílio 40'; Andrade 87'			Attendance: 69,051; Referee: Ildson Alcantara Amorim

10 November 1981 Matchday 8	Flamengo	6 – 1	Americano	Maracanã, Rio de Janeiro
	Lico 6'; Adílio 26', 28'; Nunes 73', 79'; Tita 89'		Té 51'	Attendance: 8,093; Referee: Osmar Camilo da Silva

15 November 1981 Matchday 9	Flamengo	3 – 1	Fluminense	Maracanã, Rio de Janeiro
	Nunes 19'; Lico 49'; Tita 82'		Edinho 73'	Attendance: 109,514; Referee: Alvimar Gaspar dos Reis

25 November 1981 Matchday 10	Volta Redonda	1 – 5	Flamengo	Raulino de Oliveira, Volta Redonda
	Beto Rocha 65'		Lico 19'; Nunes 38'; Adílio 43', 68'; Zico 64'	Attendance: 17,818; Referee: Edson Alcantara Amorim

=== Finals ===
29 November 1981 Final	Flamengo	0 – 2	Vasco da Gama	Maracanã, Rio de Janeiro
	Nunes (red card)		Roberto Dinamite 64', 77'; Marquinho (red card)	Attendance: 80,908; Referee: Alvimar Gaspar dos Reis

2 December 1981 Replay	Vasco da Gama	1 – 0	Flamengo	Maracanã, Rio de Janeiro
	Roberto Dinamite 88'; João Luis (red card)			Attendance: 45,704; Referee: Edson Alcantara do Amorim

6 December 1981 Replay	Flamengo	2 – 1	Vasco da Gama	Maracanã, Rio de Janeiro
	Adílio 20'; Nunes 24'		Ticão 83'	Attendance: 161,989; Referee: Alvimar Gaspar dos Reis

== Copa Libertadores ==
The 1981 edition of the Copa Libertadores was Flamengo's debut season in the tournament. Flamengo qualified as champion of 1980 Campeonato Brasileiro (Atlético Mineiro qualified as runners-up). Flamengo would go on to win the tournament, undefeated until the final against Chilean newcomers Cobreloa.

In the first group stage, the Brazilian entrants were paired with both Paraguayan clubs: Cerro Porteño and Olimpia. Flamengo had to travel away to Asunción for their last two matchdays and needed at least 3 points to catch Atlético Mineiro (only the top team in the group would advance). Former player and assistant Paulo César Carpegiani assumed the role of manager from Dino Sani after their second draw against Atlético on the 4th matchday. Flamengo were equal on points with the club from Belo Horizonte and forced a play-off at the neutral Estádio Serra Dourada in Goiânia. However the match was suspended after 37 minutes as Atlético were reduced to only six eligible players (Osmar, Chicao, Palinha, Reinaldo and Eder were sent off). Per regulation, victory was awarded to Flamengo.

Flamengo advanced through the semi-final group with a dominant performance: four victories in four matches. In the final, they encountered another Libertadores debutante in Cobreloa, a club that had only been founded four years prior. In the first final at the Maracanã, Flamengo prevailed (2 – 1) with two goals from Zico. In the National Stadium in Santiago the following week (not in Cobreloa's home town of Calama), the Brazilians were pressured on the field and, according to Zico, injured by Cobreloa players hiding rocks in their hands, and disadvantaged by the Uruguayan referee Ramón Barreto. Victor Merello scored the only goal of the match on a free kick.

Equal on goals, a third match was played at the neutral venue of the Estadio Centenario in Montevideo. If the third match ended in a draw, extra time would be played. If still tied, the trophy would be awarded to Cobreloa based on away goals. Zico scored twice in the first half, sealing the game and the championship. With the match won, Anselmo of Flamengo entered on in the final minutes for the sole purpose of hurting Cobreloa captain Mario Soto in revenge. Both were sent off. Flamengo were crowned Champions of America, and returned to Brazil to dispute the Rio de Janeiro state league final, with a match against Liverpool in Tokyo confirmed for December.

=== Group stage ===
Group 3

3 July 1981 Matchday 1	Atletico Mineiro (Brazil)	2 – 2	(Brazil) Flamengo	Mineirão, Belo Horizonte
	Éder 28', 63'		Nunes 65'; Marinho 85'	Attendance: 63,153; Referee: José Roberto Wright (Brazil)

14 July 1981 Matchday 2	Flamengo (Brazil)	5 – 2	(Paraguay) Cerro Porteño	Maracanã, Rio de Janeiro
	Zico 20', 27'; Baroninho 47'; Nunes 62', 62'		Jimenes 62'; Julio Dos Santos 90'	Attendance: 25,967; Referee: Carlos Montalvan (Brazil)

24 July 1981 Matchday 3	Flamengo (Brazil)	1 – 1	(Paraguay) Olimpia	Maracanã, Rio de Janeiro
	Adilio 22'		Solalinde 60'	Attendance: 38,718; Referee: Abel Gnecco

7 August 1981 Matchday 4	Flamengo (Brazil)	2 – 2	(Brazil) Atletico Mineiro	Maracanã, Rio de Janeiro
	Nunes 67'; Tita 69'		Palhinha 62'; Reinaldo 69'	Attendance: 62,763; Referee: Carlos Rosa Martins

11 August 1981 Matchday 5	Cerro Porteño (Paraguay)	2 – 4	(Brazil) Flamengo	Estadio Defensores del Chaco, Asunción
	Acost 69'; Jimenes 72'		Baroninho 7'; Zico 58', 65', 70'	Attendance: 13,000; Referee: Roque Cerullo

14 August 1981 Matchday 6	Olimpia (Paraguay)	0 – 0	(Brazil) Flamengo	Estadio Defensores del Chaco, Asunción
				Attendance: 25,000; Referee: José Martizez Bazan

22 August 1981 Play-off	Flamengo (Brazil)	0 – 0	(Brazil) Atletico Mineiro	Serra Dourada, Goiânia
				Referee: José Roberto Wright
Note: Match awarded to Flamengo at 37 minutes after Atlético only had 6 players available (five were sent off). Score of the match was 0–0 at the time of stoppage.

=== Semi-finals ===
Group A

Pos	Team	Pld	W	D	L	GF	GA	GD	Pts	Qualification	(Brazil) FLA	(Colombia) CAL	(Bolivia) JOR
1	(Brazil) Flamengo	4	4	0	0	10	2	+8	8	Qualified to the Final	—	3–0	4–1
2	(Colombia) Deportivo Cali	4	1	1	2	2	5	−3	3		0–1	—	1–0
3	(Bolivia) Jorge Wilstermann	4	0	1	3	3	8	−5	1		1–2	1–1	—

Legend: Blue = home team win; Yellow = draw; Red = away team win.

2 October 1981 Matchday 1	Deportivo Cali (Colombia)	0 – 1	(Brazil) Flamengo	Estadio Olímpico Pascual Guerrero, Cali
			Nunes 1'	Attendance: 50,000; Referee: Mário Lira

13 October 1981 Matchday 2	Jorge Wilstermann (Bolivia)	1 – 2	(Brazil) Flamengo	Estadio Félix Capriles, Cochabamba
	Melgar 53'		Baroninho 13'; Adilio 64'	Referee: Enrique Labo

23 October 1981 Matchday 3	Flamengo (Brazil)	3 – 0	(Colombia) Deportivo Cali	Maracanã, Rio de Janeiro
	Zico 9', 82'; Chiquinho 57'			Attendance: 28,847; Referee: Juan Cardelino

30 October 1981 Matchday 4	Flamengo (Brazil)	4 – 1	(Bolivia) Jorge Wilstermann	Maracanã, Rio de Janeiro
	Nunes 9'; Adilio 39'; Anselmo 87'; Chiquinho 90'		Tarborga 2'	Attendance: 7,520; Referee: Jorge Orellana

=== Finals ===
13 November 1981 First leg	Flamengo (Brazil)	2 – 1	(Chile) Cobreloa	Maracanã, Rio de Janeiro
	Zico 12', 30' (pen.)	Report	Merello 65'	Attendance: 93,985; Referee: Esposito (Argentina)

20 November 1981 Second leg	Cobreloa (Chile)	1 – 0	(Brazil) Flamengo	Estadio Nacional, Santiago
	Merello 84'	Report		Attendance: 61,721; Referee: Ramón Barreto (Uruguay)

23 November 1981 Tie-break	Flamengo (Brazil)	2 – 0	(Chile) Cobreloa	Estadio Centenario, Montevideo
	Zico 18', 84'; Andrade (red card) 35'; Anselmo (red card) 89'	Report	Armando Alarcón (red card) 23'; Eduardo Jiménez (red card) 35'; Mario Soto (red card) 90'	Attendance: 30,200; Referee: Roque Cerullo (Uruguay)

== Intercontinental Cup ==
A week after conquering the Campeonato Carioca against Vasco, Flamengo flew to Tokyo to contest the Intercontinental Cup (also branded as the Toyota Cup) against European Cup champions Liverpool. A number of the key players on both squads had shared the field with each other earlier in the year, in an international friendly at Wembley in May, including Zico and Júnior of Flamengo and Terry McDermott and Phil Neal of Liverpool.

The 1981 edition was the second such championship to be played as a single neutral-venue match in Tokyo's National Stadium. Flamengo won 3 – 0 off two goals from Nunes and one from Adílio, officially being declared world champions by FIFA. This marks Flamengo's first and only world championship (as of 2018).

13 December 1981	Liverpool (England)	0 – 3	(Brazil) Flamengo	National Stadium, Tokyo
12:00 JST		Report	Nunes 12', 42'; Adílio 34'	Attendance: 62,000; Referee: Rubio Vásquez (Mexico)

== Overview ==
Competition	First match	Last match	Starting round	Final position	Record							
Competition	First match	Last match	Starting round	Final position	Pld	W	D	L	GF	GA	GD	Win %
Campeonato Carioca	23 May 1981	6 December 1981	Matchday 1	Winners	35	23	8	4	83	22	+61	65.71
Copa Libertadores	3 July 1981	23 November 1981	Group stage	Winners	14	8	5	1	28	13	+15	57.14
Campeonato Brasileiro	18 January 1981	11 April 1981	Matchday 1	Quarter-finals	19	9	7	3	30	19	+11	47.37
Intercontinental Cup	13 December 1981		Final	Winners	1	1	0	0	3	0	+3	100.00
Total					69	41	20	8	144	54	+90	59.42

Source: Competitions

== Goal scorers ==
Rank	Pos.	No.	Player	Carioca	Brasileiro	Libertadores	Intercontinental	Total
1	FW	9	(Brazil) Nunes	21	16	6	2	45
2	MF	10	(Brazil) Zico	25	3	11	0	39
3	MF	8	(Brazil) Adílio	9	1	3	1	14
4	FW	7	(Brazil) Tita	6	2	1	0	9
5	FW	16	(Brazil) Baroninho	4	0	3	0	7
6	FW	11	(Brazil) Lico	5	0	0	0	5
6	FW	15	(Brazil) Peu	1	4	0	0	5
8	FW		(Brazil) Chiquinho	1	0	2	0	3
8	DF	5	(Brazil) Júnior	3	0	0	0	3
10	MF	6	(Brazil) Andrade	2	0	0	0	2
10	FW		(Brazil) Luiz Fumanchu	0	2	0	0	2
10	DF	4	(Brazil) Marinho	0	1	1	0	2
10	DF	14	(Brazil) Mozer	2	0	0	0	2
14	FW		(Brazil) Anselmo	0	0	1	0	1
14	DF		(Brazil) Rodinelli	1	0	0	0	1
14	FW		(Brazil) Ronaldo	1	0	0	0	1
14	MF		(Brazil) Vítor	0	1	0	0	1
Own Goals				2	0	0	0	2
Total				83	30	28	3	144

== Honors ==
Name	Award
(Brazil) Zico	World Footballer of the Year (ABC) South American Footballer of the Year (El Mundo) Copa Libertadores Top Scorer Copa Libertadores Best Player Intercontinental Cup MVP Award
(Brazil) Nunes	Copa Libertadores Best Striker Campeonato Brasileiro Top Scorer
