= 1981–82 Liverpool F.C. season =

English football club season

Liverpool F.C.
1981–82 season
- Manager: Bob Paisley
- First Division: Champions
- FA Cup: Fifth round
- League Cup: Winners
- European Cup: Quarter-finals
- Intercontinental Cup: Runners-up
- Top goalscorer: League: Ian Rush (17); All: Ian Rush (30)
Home colours	Away colours

The 1981–82 season was Liverpool Football Club's 90th season in existence and their 20th consecutive season in the First Division. After finishing fifth the previous season, Liverpool came back and won their thirteenth league title. They also won the Football League Cup for the second successive season, beating Tottenham Hotspur 3-1 at Wembley Stadium.

However, Liverpool were decisively beaten by Flamengo at the 1981 Intercontinental Cup final. Neither did they regain the European Cup, having been knocked out by CSKA Sofia in the quarter-finals and surprisingly being knocked out by Second Division Chelsea in the fifth round of the FA Cup.

It was also a season with major changes in the team, as many of the players who won the trophies over the previous seasons were being replaced by players who would go on to be part of the team that remained successful for the rest of the decade. Players such as Bruce Grobbelaar, Mark Lawrenson, Ian Rush, Ronnie Whelan and Craig Johnston came into the team during the season and would make their mark on changing the side, that would go forward into the decade.

== Squad ==
=== Goalkeepers ===
- (England) Steve Ogrizovic
- (Zimbabwe) Bruce Grobbelaar

=== Defenders ===
- (England) Phil Neal
- (Scotland) Alan Hansen
- (England) Phil Thompson
- (England) Alan Kennedy
- (England) Richard Money
- (Republic of Ireland) Mark Lawrenson

=== Midfielders ===
- (Australia) Craig Johnston
- (England) Sammy Lee
- (England) Ray Kennedy
- (England) Terry McDermott
- (Republic of Ireland) Kevin Sheedy
- (Scotland) Graeme Souness
- (Republic of Ireland) Ronnie Whelan
- (Scotland) Steve Nicol

=== Attackers ===
- (England) David Fairclough
- (Scotland) Kenny Dalglish
- (England) Howard Gayle
- (England) David Johnson
- (Wales) Ian Rush

== Squad statistics ==
=== Appearances and goals ===
No.	Pos	Nat	Player	Total		Division 1		FA Cup		League Cup		European Cup		World Club Champ.	
No.	Pos	Nat	Player	Apps	Goals	Apps	Goals	Apps	Goals	Apps	Goals	Apps	Goals	Apps	Goals
	FW	(Scotland) SCO	Kenny Dalglish	62	22	42+0	13	3+0	2	10+0	5	6+0	2	1+0	0
	GK	(Zimbabwe) ZIM	Bruce Grobbelaar	62	0	42+0	0	3+0	0	10+0	0	6+0	0	1+0	0
	DF	(Scotland) SCO	Alan Hansen	52	2	35+0	0	3+0	1	8+0	0	5+0	1	1+0	0
	FW	(England) ENG	David Johnson	25	7	10+5	2	0+1	0	1+3	3	3+1	2	0+1	0
	MF	(Australia) AUS	Craig Johnston	23	7	13+5	6	0+1	0	0+2	1	0+1	0	1+0	0
	DF	(England) ENG	Alan Kennedy	47	3	32+2	3	3+0	0	6+0	0	4+0	0	0+0	0
	MF	(England) ENG	Ray Kennedy	23	3	15+0	2	0+0	0	3+0	0	4+0	1	1+0	0
	DF	(England) ENG	Mark Lawrenson	59	4	37+2	2	3+0	1	10+0	0	5+1	1	1+0	0
	MF	(England) ENG	Sammy Lee	49	4	35+0	3	2+0	0	6+0	0	5+0	1	1+0	0
	MF	(England) ENG	Terry McDermott	48	20	28+1	14	3+0	0	10+0	3	5+0	3	1+0	0
	DF	(England) ENG	Phil Neal	62	3	42+0	2	3+0	0	10+0	1	6+0	0	1+0	0
	FW	(Wales) WAL	Ian Rush	49	30	32+0	17	3+0	3	10+0	8	3+1	2	0+0	0
	MF	(Republic of Ireland) IRL	Kevin Sheedy	4	2	0+2	0	0+0	0	2+0	2	0+0	0	0+0	0
	MF	(Scotland) SCO	Graeme Souness	54	6	34+1	5	3+0	0	9+0	1	6+0	0	1+0	0
	DF	(England) ENG	Phil Thompson	48	0	34+0	0	1+0	0	7+0	0	5+0	0	1+0	0
	MF	(Republic of Ireland) IRL	Ronnie Whelan	47	14	31+1	10	3+0	0	8+0	3	3+1	1	0+0	0

== League table ==
Pos	Team	Pld	W	D	L	GF	GA	GD	Pts	Qualification or relegation
1	Liverpool (C)	42	26	9	7	80	32	+48	87	Qualification for the European Cup first round
2	Ipswich Town	42	26	5	11	75	53	+22	83	Qualification for the UEFA Cup first round
3	Manchester United	42	22	12	8	59	29	+30	78	Qualification for the UEFA Cup first round
4	Tottenham Hotspur	42	20	11	11	67	48	+19	71	Qualification for the Cup Winners' Cup first round (Note: Tottenham Hotspur qualified for the European Cup Winners' Cup first round as the 1981–82 FA Cup winners.)
5	Arsenal	42	20	11	11	48	37	+11	71	Qualification for the UEFA Cup first round

Source: World Football
Rules for classification: 1) Points; 2) Goal difference; 3) Goals scored
(C) Champions

== Results ==
=== First Division ===
Date	Opponents	Venue	Result	Scorers	Attendance	Report 1	Report 2
29-Aug-81	Wolverhampton Wanderers	A	0–1		28,001	Report	Report
01-Sep-81	Middlesbrough	H	1–1	Neal 53' (pen.)	31,963	Report	Report
05-Sep-81	Arsenal	H	2–0	McDermott 44' Johnson 89'	35,269	Report	Report
12-Sep-81	Ipswich Town	A	0–2		26,703	Report	Report
19-Sep-81	Aston Villa	H	0–0		37,474	Report	Report
22-Sep-81	Coventry City	A	2–1	A Kennedy 2' McDermott 26' (pen.)	16,731	Report	Report
26-Sep-81	West Ham United	A	1–1	Johnson 77'	30,802	Report	Report
03-Oct-81	Swansea City	H	2–2	McDermott 59' (pen.), 64' (pen.)	48,645	Report	Report
10-Oct-81	Leeds United	H	3–0	Rush 17', 89' Own goal 26'	35,840	Report	Report
17-Oct-81	Brighton & Hove Albion	A	3–3	Dalglish 12' R Kennedy 39' McDermott 73'	26,321	Report	Report
24-Oct-81	Manchester United	H	1–2	McDermott 74' (pen.)	41,438	Report	Report
31-Oct-81	Sunderland	A	2–0	Souness 61' McDermott 77'	27,854	Report	Report
07-Nov-81	Everton	H	3–1	Dalglish 47', 52' Rush 75'	48,861	Report	Report
21-Nov-81	West Bromwich Albion	A	1–1	Dalglish 90'	20,871	Report	Report
28-Nov-81	Southampton	H	0–1		37,189	Report	Report
05-Dec-81	Nottingham Forest	A	2–0	Lawrenson 57' R Kennedy 59'	24,521	Report	Report
26-Dec-81	Manchester City	H	1–3	Whelan 85'	37,929	Report	Report
05-Jan-82	West Ham United	H	3–0	McDermott 25' Whelan 27' Dalglish 68'	28,427	Report	Report
16-Jan-82	Wolverhampton Wanderers	H	2–1	Whelan 74' Dalglish 82'	26,438	Report	Report
26-Jan-82	Notts County	A	4–0	Whelan 44' Rush 67', 75', 84'	14,407	Report	Report
30-Jan-82	Aston Villa	A	3–0	Rush 3' McDermott 23', 73'	35,947	Report	Report
06-Feb-82	Ipswich Town	H	4–0	McDermott 14' Rush 17' Dalglish 44' Whelan 57'	41,316	Report	Report
16-Feb-82	Swansea City	A	0–2		22,604	Report	Report
20-Feb-82	Coventry City	H	4–0	Souness 5' Lee 13' Rush 34' McDermott 64' (pen.)	28,286	Report	Report
27-Feb-82	Leeds United	A	2–0	Souness 40' Rush 76'	33,689	Report	Report
06-Mar-82	Brighton & Hove Albion	H	0–1		28,574	Report	Report
09-Mar-82	Stoke City	A	5–1	McDermott 15' Dalglish 29' Souness 48' Lee 80' Whelan 87'	16,758	Report	Report
20-Mar-82	Sunderland	H	1–0	Rush 14'	30,344	Report	Report
27-Mar-82	Everton	A	3–1	Whelan 21' Souness 57' Johnston 81'	51,847	Report	Report
30-Mar-82	Birmingham City	H	3–1	Rush 10', 74' McDermott 78'	24,224	Report	Report
02-Apr-82	Notts County	H	1–0	Dalglish 61'	30,126	Report	Report
07-Apr-82	Manchester United	A	1–0	Johnston 63'	50,969	Report	Report
10-Apr-82	Manchester City	A	5–0	Lee 8' Neal 42' (pen.) Johnston 58' A Kennedy 59' Rush 73'	40,112	Report	Report
13-Apr-82	Stoke City	H	2–0	A Kennedy 4' Johnston 34'	30,419	Report	Report
17-Apr-82	West Bromwich Albion	H	1–0	Dalglish 71'	34,286	Report	Report
24-Apr-82	Southampton	A	3–2	Rush 12' Whelan 57', 88'	24,704	Report	Report
01-May-82	Nottingham Forest	H	2–0	Johnston 55', 68'	34,321	Report	Report
03-May-82	Tottenham Hotspur	A	2–2	Dalglish 50', 61'	38,091	Report	Report
08-May-82	Birmingham City	A	1–0	Rush 49'	26,381	Report	Report
11-May-82	Arsenal	A	1–1	Rush 31'	30,932	Report	Report
15-May-82	Tottenham Hotspur	H	3–1	Lawrenson 51' Dalglish 55' Whelan 87'	48,122	Report	Report
18-May-82	Middlesbrough	A	0–0		17,431	Report	Report

=== FA Cup ===
Date	Opponents	Venue	Result	Scorers	Attendance	Report 1	Report 2
02-Jan-82	Swansea City	A	4–0	Hansen 35' Rush 45', 88' Lawrenson 73'	24,179	Report	Report
23-Jan-82	Sunderland	A	3–0	Dalglish 6', 15' Rush 79'	28,582	Report	Report
13-Feb-82	Chelsea	A	0–2		41,42	Report	Report

=== Football League Cup ===
Date	Opponents	Venue	Result	Scorers	Attendance	Report 1	Report 2
07-Oct-81	Exeter City	H	5–0	Rush 15', 67' McDermott 27' Dalglish 37' Whelan 68'	11,478	Report	Report
28-Oct-81	Exeter City	A	6–0	Rush 15', 89' Dalglish 23' Neal 44' Sheedy 53' Own goal 80'	11,740	Report	Report
10-Nov-81	Middlesbrough	H	4–1	Sheedy 29' Rush 64' Johnson 74', 80'	16,145	Report	Report
01-Dec-81	Arsenal	A	0–0		37,917	Report	Report
08-Dec-81	Arsenal	H	3–0	Johnston 95' McDermott 101' (pen.) Dalglish 108'	21,375	Report	Report
12-Jan-82	Barnsley	H	0–0		33,707	Report	Report
19-Jan-82	Barnsley	A	3–1	Souness 37' Johnson 81' Dalglish 89'	29,639	Report	Report
02-Feb-82	Ipswich Town	A	2–0	McDermott 47' Rush 49'	26,690	Report	Report
09-Feb-82	Ipswich Town	H	2–2	Rush 26' Dalglish 47'	34,933	Report	Report

==== League Cup Final ====
13 March 1982
15:00 GMT

Liverpool	3–1 (a.e.t.)	Tottenham Hotspur
Whelan 87', 111'; Rush 119'	Report	Archibald 11'

Wembley Stadium, London

Liverpool	Tottenham Hotspur

GK	1	(Zimbabwe) Bruce Grobbelaar
RB	2	(England) Phil Neal
LB	3	(England) Alan Kennedy
CB	4	(England) Phil Thompson
LM	5	(Republic of Ireland) Ronnie Whelan
CB	6	(Republic of Ireland) Mark Lawrenson
CF	7	(Scotland) Kenny Dalglish
RM	8	(England) Sammy Lee
CF	9	(Wales) Ian Rush
CM	10	(England) Terry McDermott	Substituted off
CM	11	(Scotland) Graeme Souness (c)
Substitute:
	12	(England) David Johnson	Substituted on
Manager:
(England) Bob Paisley

GK	1	(England) Ray Clemence
LB	2	(Republic of Ireland) Chris Hughton
CB	3	(England) Paul Miller
CB	4	(Wales) Paul Price
RM	5	(England) Micky Hazard
RB	6	(England) Steve Perryman (c)
CM	7	(Argentina) Osvaldo Ardiles
CF	8	(Scotland) Steve Archibald
LM	9	(Republic of Ireland) Tony Galvin
CM	10	(England) Glenn Hoddle
CF	11	(England) Garth Crooks
Substitute:
MF	12	(Argentina) Ricardo Villa
Manager:
(England) Keith Burkinshaw

=== European Cup ===
Date	Opponents	Venue	Result	Scorers	Attendance	Report 1	Report 2
16-Sep-81	Oulu Palloseura	A	1–0	Dalglish 84'	8,400	Report	Report
30-Sep-81	Oulu Palloseura	H	7–0	Dalglish 26' McDermott 40', 75' R Kennedy 46' Johnson 60' Rush 67' Lawrenson 72'	20,789	Report	Report
21-Oct-81	AZ Alkmaar	A	2–2	Johnson 26' Lee 49'	15,000	Report	Report
04-Nov-81	AZ Alkmaar	H	3–2	McDermott 42' (pen.) Rush 68' Hansen 85'	29,703	Report	Report
03-Mar-82	CSKA Sofia	H	1–0	Whelan 65'	27,388	Report	Report
17-Mar-82	CSKA Sofia	A	0–2		60,000	Report	Report

=== Intercontinental Cup ===
13 December 1981
12:00 JST

Liverpool (England)	0–3	(Brazil) Flamengo
	Report	Nunes 12' 41'; Adílio 34'

National Stadium, Tokyo
Attendance: 62,000
Referee: Rubio Vásquez (Mexico)

Liverpool	Flamengo

GK	1	(Zimbabwe) Bruce Grobbelaar
RB	2	(England) Phil Neal
CB	4	(England) Phil Thompson (c)
CB	6	(Scotland) Alan Hansen
LB	3	(Republic of Ireland) Mark Lawrenson
RM	14	(England) Sammy Lee
CM	10	(England) Terry McDermott	(substituted off) 51'
CM	11	(Scotland) Graeme Souness
LM	5	(England) Ray Kennedy
SS	7	(Scotland) Kenny Dalglish
CF	16	(Australia) Craig Johnston
Substitutes:
GK	13	(England) Steve Ogrizovic
DF	15	(England) Alan Kennedy
MF	17	(Republic of Ireland) Kevin Sheedy
MF	8	(Republic of Ireland) Ronnie Whelan
FW	12	(England) David Johnson	(substituted on) 51'
Manager:
(England) Bob Paisley

GK	1	(Brazil) Raul
RB	2	(Brazil) Leandro
CB	13	(Brazil) Marinho
CB	4	(Brazil) Mozer
LB	5	(Brazil) Júnior
DM	6	(Brazil) Andrade
MF	8	(Brazil) Adílio
AM	10	(Brazil) Zico (c)
FW	7	(Brazil) Tita
CF	9	(Brazil) Nunes
FW	11	(Brazil) Lico
Substitutes:
GK	12	(Brazil) Cantarele
DF	3	(Brazil) Figueiredo
FW	15	(Brazil) Peu
FW	16	(Brazil) Baroninho
DF	17	(Brazil) Nei Dias
Manager:
(Brazil) Paulo Carpegiani
