= Lico (footballer, born 1951) =

Brazilian footballer and manager

Personal information
- Full name: Antônio Nunes
- Date of birth: 9 August 1951 (age 75)
- Place of birth: Imbituba, Santa Catarina, Brazil
- Height: 5 ft 9 in (1.74 m)
- Positions: Midfielder; forward

Senior career*
Years	Team	Apps	(Gls)
1970–1973	América (SC)		
1973	→ Grêmio (loan)		
1974–1975	Figueirense		
1976	Marcílio Dias		
1976–1979	Avaí		
1979–1980	Joinville	159	(26)
1980–1984	Flamengo	128	(17)
1981	→ Joinville (loan)		
1990	Flamengo	1	(0)
Total		288	(43)

Managerial career
- 1989: Avaí
- * Club domestic league appearances and goals

Antônio Nunes, better known as Lico (born 9 August 1951) is a Brazilian former professional football player and manager who played as a midfielder and striker. He was a club icon for Brazilian football clubs Joinville and Flamengo, winning the 1981 Copa Libertadores and Intercontinental Cup with the latter.

== Career ==
=== Playing career ===
Born in Santa Catarina, Lico began his professional career with América of Joinville in 1970. Two years later, he was loaned to Grêmio where he was a reserve for six months in 1973. Following this loan he returned to Santa Catarina football, playing for Figueirense, Marcílio Dias, Avaí and Joinville. For Joinville the left-winger was a two-time state champion (1979–80), becoming an idol of the fans.

In 1980, Lico moved to Rio de Janeiro joining Flamengo. He would arrive at the club at the request of manager Cláudio Coutinho to be a substitute for Zico. Lico did not become a starter immediately. He made sporadic appearances in the Campeonato Carioca that year, mostly coming off the bench. He returned to Joinville on loan at the beginning of 1981 but returned to Flamengo in May, fortunate to play alongside stars Zico, Leandro, Andrade, Júnior and Adílio, being a key part of the club's historic conquest of the Copa Libertadores and Intercontinental Cup of 1981.

After two knee surgeries, Lico was forced to retire in 1984 at the age of 33.

=== Managerial career ===
After retiring from play, Lico turned to managing. He only managed clubs from his home region in the south of Brazil including Londrina, Avaí, and Joinville.

== Career statistics ==
=== Club ===
As of 6 February 1990

Club	Season	State League		National League		Continental		Other		Total	
Club	Season	Apps	Goals	Apps	Goals	Apps	Goals	Apps	Goals	Apps	Goals
Flamengo	1980	5	0	0	0	-		2	0	7	0
Flamengo	1981	13	5	0	0	5	0	1	0	19	5
Flamengo	1982	21	3	19	2	4	1	12	2	56	8
Flamengo	1983	7	1	9	2	1	0	2	0	19	3
Flamengo	1984	2	0	14	0	7	1	3	0	26	1
Flamengo	1990	-		-		-		1	0	1	0
Career total		48	9	42	4	17	2	21	2	128	17

== Titles ==
Figueirense

- Campeonato Catarinense: 1974

Joinville

- Campeonato Catarinense: 1979, 1980

Flamengo

- Copa Libertadores: 1981
- Intercontinental Cup: 1981
- Campeonato Carioca: 1981
- Campeonato Brasileiro: 1982, 1983
- Taça Guanabara: 1981, 1982, 1984
- Taça Rio: 1983
- City of Santander Cup: 1980
