= Marinho (footballer, born 1955) =

Brazilian footballer

Personal information
- Full name: Mário Caetano Filho
- Date of birth: 27 February 1955 (age 71)
- Place of birth: Londrina, Paraná, Brazil
- Height: 6 ft 2 in (1.87 m)
- Position: Centre-back

Youth career
- 1973: Londrina

Senior career*
Years	Team	Apps	(Gls)
1974–1979	Londrina	44	(13)
1976	→ Umuarama (loan)	0	(0)
1976	→ Linense (loan)	0	(0)
1977	→ São Paulo (loan)	7	(0)
1980–1984	Flamengo	218	(6)
1984	Atlético Mineiro	21	(0)
1985–1988	Botafogo	28	(1)
1988	Arapongas	0	(0)
1989	Umuarama	0	(0)
1989	Londrina	1	(0)
1990	Flamengo	1	(0)
Total		328	(20)

International career
1983	Brazil	1	(0)
- * Club domestic league appearances and goals

Mário Caetano Filho, better known as Marinho (born 27 February 1955) is a Brazilian former professional football player who played as a centre-back. He is most well-known for his time at Flamengo beginning in 1980.

== Career ==
=== Club career ===
Marinho began his career in the youth academy of Londrina in 1973. He made his professional debut on 2 April 1975 as a substitute in a 1-0 victory over América (SP). In 1976 he was loaned to Umuarama and Linense but returned to Londrina that same year. Viewed as a valuable prospect, he caught the attention of São Paulo who he played for on loan in 1977. He only played 5 matches but made part of the team that won the 1977 Brazilian Championship.

Still playing as a defender for Londrina, Marinho scored 6 goals in 1978 and 7 goals in 1979. He caught the attention of Flamengo manager Cláudio Coutinho who made his acquisition a priority. Marinho was transferred for 5 million cruzeiro, the largest outgoing transfer fee from the state of Paraná at the time.

Marinho was very successful at Flamengo from 1980 to 1984. His Flamengo debut came in a scoreless draw in a friendly against former club São Paulo. Marinho played alongside Zico, Júnior and Leandro and was part of the team that won the 1981 Copa Libertadores de América and 1981 Intercontinental Cup. Marinho and centre-back partner Mozer were in the starting lineup in the third and decisive match against Cobreloa in the 1981 Libertadores final. Three weeks later the same defense faced and defeated Liverpool. Marinho was also involved in the 1980, 1982 and 1983 Brazilian Championship-winning teams.

After a fruitful period at Flamengo, Atlético Mineiro negotiated for the centre-back. He played there from April to August 1984. The following year he moved to Botafogo where he played until 1988. He played short stints at Arapongas and Umuarama before retiring from Londrina in 1989 at the age of 37. He returned to Flamengo for one farewell match in 1990.

=== National team ===
Marinho played for the Brazil national team in 1983 under manager Carlos Alberto Parreira in friendlies against Chile and the "Seleção Gaúcha" (selection from the state of Rio Grande do Sul).

== Titles ==
Londrina

- Campeonato do Interior Paranaense: 1976

São Paulo

- Campeonato Brasileiro: 1977

Flamengo

- Copa Libertadores: 1981
- Intercontinental Cup: 1981
- Campeonato Carioca: 1981
- Campeonato Brasileiro: 1980, 1982, 1983
- Taça Guanabara: 1980, 1981, 1982, 1984
- Taça Rio: 1983
