= 1981 Intercontinental Cup =

- Match programme cover, depicting Kenny Dalglish and Zico
Liverpool	Flamengo
(England)	(Brazil)
0	3
- Date: 13 December 1981
- Venue: National Stadium, Tokyo
- Man of the Match: Zico (Flamengo)
- Referee: Mario Rubio Vázquez (Mexico)
- Attendance: 62,000

The 1981 Intercontinental Cup was an association football match between Liverpool of England and Flamengo of Brazil on 13 December 1981 at the National Stadium in Tokyo, Japan. The annual Intercontinental Cup was contested between the winners of the European Cup and the Copa Libertadores. Liverpool qualified for the Intercontinental Cup for the first time. They had declined to take part in 1977 and 1978 after they won the European Cup. Flamengo were also appearing in their first Intercontinental Cup following their Copa Libertadores Cup success. On 27 October 2017, following a meeting held in Kolkata, India, the FIFA Council recognised the winners of Intercontinental Cup as world champions.

Liverpool qualified for the Intercontinental Cup by winning the primary European cup competition, the European Cup. They won the 1980–81 European Cup defeating Spanish team Real Madrid 1–0 in the final. Flamengo qualified by winning the primary South American cup competition, the Copa Libertadores. They beat Chilean team Cobreloa 2–0 in a playoff after the previous ties finished 2–2 on points to win the 1981 Copa Libertadores.

Watched by a crowd of 62,000, Flamengo took the lead in the 12th minute when João Batista Nunes scored. They extended their lead in the 34th minute when Adílio added a second. A further goal was scored in the 41st minute by Nunes to give Flamengo a 3–0 lead at half-time. Liverpool were unable to respond in the second half and with no further goals scored, Flamengo won the match to secure their first victory in the Intercontinental Cup. It was the fourth successive victory by a South American team.

== Background ==
Liverpool qualified for the Intercontinental Cup as the reigning European Cup winners. They won the 1980–81 European Cup beating Real Madrid 1–0 in the final. This was their first appearance in the Intercontinental Cup. They had been scheduled to take place in 1977 and 1978 but did not compete. They declined to play in 1977 and were replaced by runners-up Borussia Mönchengladbach, while Liverpool decided against playing Boca Juniors in 1978 due to the brutality of previous Intercontinental Cup matches.

Flamengo qualified for the competition as a result of winning the 1981 Copa Libertadores. They beat Chilean team Cobreloa 2–0 in a playoff after the previous two-legs had resulted in a 2–2 draw on points. The second leg and replay were marred by brutality. Flamengo players Adílio and Lico were cut by a rock brought onto the pitch by Cobreloa defender Mario Soto during the second leg. While four players were sent off in the playoff. It was Flamengo's first appearance in the Intercontinental Cup after winning the Copa Libertadores for the first time.

Liverpool's last match before the Intercontinental Cup was against Arsenal in the fourth round of the 1981–82 Football League Cup. They won 3–0 in extra time courtesy of goals from Craig Johnston, Terry McDermott and Kenny Dalglish. The last match Flamengo played before the Intercontinental Cup was against Vasco de Gama in the final match of the 1981 Campeonato Carioca. Flamengo won 2–1 with goals from Adílio and João Batista Nunes to win the competition. Before the match, Liverpool manager Bob Paisley was informed of the death of goalkeeper, Bruce Grobbelaar's father. It was decided to keep the news of the death from him to maintain his focus on the match.

== Match ==
=== Summary ===
The first chance fell to Flamengo in the 12th minute, which they scored from. Zico passed to Nunes, who had run in between Liverpool defenders Phil Neal and Phil Thompson. The pass went over Thompson's head and Nunes placed the ball beyond Grobbelaar with his first touch to give Flamengo the lead. Ian Hargraves, writing in the Liverpool Daily Post stated that the first goal "was a shattering blow and one from which Liverpool never recovered." He also noted that "The Brazilians, playing their 77th game of the season, stroked the ball around with loving care and always had time to spare." The next chance of the match fell to Flamengo defender Júnior. A corner taken by Tita found Júnior, who was 30 yards (27 m) from goal, his volley was just wide of the Liverpool goal. Soon after, Flamengo were awarded a free-kick when Liverpool midfielder Terry McDermott brought down Tita. As Zico ran in to take the free-kick, a Flamengo player moved out of the wall in front of the Liverpool goal. This left a gap through which Zico's shot went, although Grobbelaar was able to stop the shot, the rebound fell to Adílio, who scored to give Flamengo a 2–0 lead. A third goal followed seven minutes later. Zico's pass put Nunes past the Liverpool defence and his precise shot from the right-hand side of the Liverpool penalty area went past Grobbelaar to give Flamengo a 3–0 lead.

Flamengo nearly added a fourth goal before half time, but Andrade's shot was saved by Grobbelaar. In the second half, Flamengo were content to protect the lead and played possession football for the most part. Liverpool continued to press for a goal and replaced McDermott with David Johnson early in the half. However, despite two shots on target from striker Craig Johnston, who was playing his first match for Liverpool, they were unable to score a goal. The match finished 3–0 to Flamengo to secure their first victory in the Intercontinental Cup.

=== Details ===
13 December 1981
12:00 JST

Liverpool (England)	0–3	(Brazil) Flamengo
	Report	Nunes 12', 41'; Adílio 34'

National Stadium, Tokyo
Attendance: 62,000
Referee: Mario Rubio Vázquez (Mexico)

Liverpool	Flamengo

GK	1	(Zimbabwe) Bruce Grobbelaar
CB	6	(Scotland) Alan Hansen
CB	4	(England) Phil Thompson (c)
CB	3	(Republic of Ireland) Mark Lawrenson
RWB	2	(England) Phil Neal
LWB	5	(England) Ray Kennedy
RM	14	(England) Sammy Lee
CM	10	(England) Terry McDermott	(substituted off) 51'
CM	11	(Scotland) Graeme Souness
LM	16	(Australia) Craig Johnston
CF	7	(Scotland) Kenny Dalglish
Substitutes:
GK	13	(England) Steve Ogrizovic
DF	15	(England) Alan Kennedy
MF	8	(Republic of Ireland) Ronnie Whelan
MF	17	(Republic of Ireland) Kevin Sheedy
FW	12	(England) David Johnson	(substituted on) 51'
Manager:
(England) Bob Paisley

GK	1	(Brazil) Raul Plassmann
RB	2	(Brazil) Leandro
CB	4	(Brazil) Carlos Mozer
CB	13	(Brazil) Marinho
LB	5	(Brazil) Júnior
CM	6	(Brazil) Andrade
CM	8	(Brazil) Adílio
RW	7	(Brazil) Tita
AM	10	(Brazil) Zico (c)
LW	11	(Brazil) Lico
CF	9	(Brazil) Nunes
Substitutes:
GK	12	(Brazil) Cantarele
DF	3	(Brazil) Figueiredo
MF	15	(Brazil) Peu
FW	16	(Brazil) Baroninho
DF	17	(Brazil) Nei Dias
Manager:
(Brazil) Paulo César Carpegiani

Man of the Match:
(Brazil) Zico (Flamengo)

== Post-match ==
Flamengo manager Carpegiani was delighted with his team's performance: "We were magnificent in the first half when I thought Liverpool were very disappointing. We played Zico further back than usual and, though he did not score, he did most of the damage". Reflecting on the match in a later interview, Andrade acknowledged the importance of playmaker Zico: “Zico was the great player in that team, but alongside him there was a lot of quality. It was a doddle in the first half. In the second half we managed the game.” Zico felt the Liverpool players had underestimated the ability of Flamengo: “Liverpool were the best team in Europe and they continued being so, they had high-quality players, great technical ability, but Flamengo played much better football and maybe they didn't expect we would be so strong.” Zico was awarded a Toyota Celica as a result of him being named man of the match.

Liverpool manager Paisley was at a loss to describe his team's performance: "I have never seen our team so dull, so lacking in ideas and aggression. I simply cannot understand it". Liverpool captain Thompson was equally unsure about why they had failed to match Flamengo: “We let them dictate the pace of the game. We should have tried to quicken it up instead of attempting to match them at their slower tempo. We never played as we can do, and everyone knows we can do". Midfielder Graeme Souness praised the performance of Zico: “I wanted to see how he would react to a physical challenge, but I couldn't get close enough to him to find out." Looking back years later, defender Mark Lawrenson admitted the players didn't take the match as seriously as Flamengo: “We simply didn't take the game seriously, the Brazilian boys had been there for ten days, training and acclimatising, and it was a big deal for them. They absolutely battered us. Zico was sensational.”

Liverpool finished the 1981–82 Football League First Division in first place, four points clear of Ipswich Town in second place. They also won the 1981–82 Football League Cup, beating Tottenham Hotspur 3–1 in the final. Despite their domestic success, Liverpool were unable to retain the European Cup. They were eliminated in the quarter-finals after Bulgarian team CSKA Sofia won 2–1 over two-legs. Flamengo won the 1982 Campeonato Brasileiro Série A defeating Grêmio in the finals. However, they were unable to retain the Copa Libertadores in 1982. They reached the semi-finals, but were eliminated by eventual winners Peñarol.

A decision by the FIFA Council in 2017, considered all previous winners of the Intercontinental Cup to be world champions, on the same level as the FIFA Club World Cup. The two teams met each other again in the final of the 2019 FIFA Club World Cup. Liverpool won the final 1–0 in extra time.

== See also ==
- Liverpool F.C. in international football
- 2019 FIFA Club World Cup Final — contested between same teams

== Bibliography ==
- Hale, Steve; Ponting, Ivan (1992). Liverpool In Europe. London: Guinness Publishing. ISBN 0-85112-569-7.
