= Figueiredo (footballer, born 1960) =

Brazilian footballer

Personal information
- Full name: Cláudio Figueiredo Diz
- Date of birth: 23 December 1960
- Place of birth: São Paulo, Brazil
- Date of death: 20 December 1984 (aged 23)
- Place of death: Nova Friburgo, Brazil
- Position: Centre-back

Youth career
- 1974–1978: Palmeiras

Senior career*
Years	Team	Apps	(Gls)
1978	Palmeiras	0	(0)
1979–1984	Flamengo	153	(0)
- * Club domestic league appearances and goals as of 19 January 2024

Cláudio Figueiredo Diz (23 December 1960 – 20 December 1984), simply known as Figueiredo, was a Brazilian professional footballer who played as a centre-back.

== Career ==
Revealed at Palmeiras, Figueiredo transferred to Flamengo in 1981, and there he made 153 appearances and was champion of most of the club's achievements in the early 80s, such as the two Brazilian titles, the Copa Libertadores and the Intercontinental Cup. He had the nickname "president", since the president of Brazil at the time was also the surname Figueiredo.

== Death ==
Figueiredo died 20 December 1984 after the plane he was in collided with Pico da Caledônia, killing all occupants (including Nilton, brother of player Bebeto).

== Honours ==
Flamengo

- Intercontinental Cup: 1981
- Copa Libertadores: 1981
- Campeonato Brasileiro: 1982, 1983
- Campeonato Carioca: 1979 (extra), 1981
- Taça Guanabara: 1981, 1982, 1984
