= Peu (footballer, born 1960) =

Brazilian footballer

Personal information
- Full name: Júlio dos Santos Ângelo
- Date of birth: 4 April 1960 (age 66)
- Place of birth: Maceió, Brazil
- Position: Forward

Senior career*
| Years | Team | Apps | (Gls) |
| 1977–1980 | CSA | | |
| 1981–1983 | Flamengo | 59 | (11) |
| 1983 | → Atlético Paranaense (loan) | | |
| 1983 | Santa Cruz | | |
| 1984 | Nacional-AM | | |
| 1984–1985 | Botafogo-SP | | |
| 1986 | Monterrey | | |
| 1986–1988 | Botafogo-SP | | |
| 1989 | Cruzeiro | 10 | (1) |
| 1990 | Comercial-AL | | |
| 1990 | São José-SP | | |
| 1991–1994 | CSA | | |

Managerial career
- 1996: Comercial-AL
- 1997–1998: Dínamo-AL
- 1999: Murici
- 2000: Corinthians-AL
- 2001–2002: Rio Negro-RR
- 2003–2005: Itacuruba
- 2006: Serrano-PE
- 2007: Picos
- 2007: Vera Cruz
- 2008: Vitória-PE
- 2009: Porto-PE
- 2009–2010: Vera Cruz
- 2011: Vitória-PE
- 2016: CSA (U20)
- 2019: Força e Luz
- 2020: UDA (women)
- 2020: Miguelense
- 2021–2023: Dínamo-AL
- 2024–: Ponte Preta-AL (U20)
- * Club domestic league appearances and goals

Júlio dos Santos Ângelo (born 4 April 1960), better known as Peu, is a Brazilian former professional footballer and manager who played as a forward.

== Playing career ==
A speed striker, Peu stood out for Flamengo in the early 1980s, a multi-champion team. He also played a large part of his career at CSA, where he was state champion twice, Botafogo-SP, Cruzeiro and Monterrey.

== Managerial career ==
Peu worked as a coach, especially in lower division teams in the northeast region. He managed to become champion three times in access divisions.

== Honours ==
=== Player ===
Flamengo

- Intercontinental Cup: 1981
- Copa Libertadores: 1981
- Campeonato Brasileiro: 1982, 1983
- Campeonato Carioca: 1981
- Taça Guanabara: 1981, 1982

CSA

- Campeonato Alagoano: 1980, 1994

Monterrey

- Mexican Primera División: 1985–86

=== Manager ===
Picos

- Campeonato Piauiense Second Division: 2007

Vera Cruz

- Campeonato Pernambucano Série A2: 2009

Força e Luz

- Campeonato Potiguar Second Division: 2019
