= João Nunes =

João Nunes may refer to:

- Nunes (footballer, born 1954), born João Batista Nunes de Oliveira, Brazilian football striker
- João Nunes (footballer, born 1995), Portuguese football centre-back
