= Nei Dias =

Brazilian footballer

Personal information
- Full name: Nei Severino Dias
- Date of birth: 10 May 1953 (age 73)
- Place of birth: Rio de Janeiro, Brazil
- Height: 1.71 m (5 ft 7 in)
- Position: Right back

Youth career
- –1973: Botafogo

Senior career*
Years	Team	Apps	(Gls)
1973–1974	Botafogo		
1975–1976	Americano		
1977	Vila Nova		
1977–1978	Atlético Paranaense		
1979–1980	Atlético Mineiro		
1981	Flamengo	24	(0)
1982	Fluminense	33	(2)
1983	São Cristóvão		
1983	Bangu		
1985	Brasil de Pelotas		
1986	Operário-MT		
1986	CSA		
- * Club domestic league appearances and goals as of 23 January 2024

Nei Severino Dias (born 10 May 1953), better known as Nei Dias, is a Brazilian former professional footballer who played as a right back.

== Career ==
Revealed at Botafogo, Nei Dias played little for the team, standing out for other major Brazilian football clubs such as Atlético Mineiro, where he was state champion in 1979, and at Flamengo, where he played as a starter in the final of the 1981 Copa Libertadores, and He was part of the squad for the 1981 Intercontinental Cup. He also played for Athletico Parananense, Fluminense, Vila Nova, Brasil de Pelotas and Operário.

== Personal life ==
Nei is brother of also footballer Nílson Dias.

== Honours ==
Flamengo

- Intercontinental Cup: 1981
- Copa Libertadores: 1981
- Campeonato Carioca: 1981
- Taça Guanabara: 1981

Atlético Mineiro

- Campeonato Mineiro: 1979

Vila Nova

- Campeonato Goiano: 1977

Operário

- Campeonato Matogrossense: 1986
