= Luiz Fumanchu =

Brazilian footballer

Personal information
- Full name: Jorge Luís da Silva
- Date of birth: 14 November 1952 (age 73)
- Place of birth: Castelo, Espírito Santo, Brazil
- Position: Forward

Senior career*
Years	Team	Apps	(Gls)
?–?	Castelo		
?–?	Fluminense		
1974	Vasco da Gama		
1975	Santa Cruz		
1976	Vasco da Gama		
1977	Santa Cruz		
1978–1979	Fluminense		
1979–1980	América	37	(11)
1980	Londrina		
1981	Flamengo		
1982	Londrina		
- * Club domestic league appearances and goals

Jorge Luís da Silva, known as Luiz Fumanchu (born 14 November 1952) is a Brazilian former professional footballer who played as a forward.

== Career ==
Born in Castelo, Espírito Santo, Fumanchu began playing football with local side Castelo Futebol Clube from age 14. However, his older brother, Sérgio Roberto, encouraged him to join him at Fluminense Football Club in Rio de Janeiro. He played for CR Vasco da Gama and Santa Cruz Futebol Clube during 1974 through 1977.

Fumanchu moved to Mexico in 1979, joining Club América for one season. He returned to Brazil where he played for Londrina Esporte Clube.

After he retired, Fumanchu became a sports radio commentator based in Castelo.

== Honours ==
Flamengo

- Copa Libertadores: 1981
