= Antônio Rondinelli =

Brazilian footballer (born 1954)

Rondinelli
Personal information
- Full name: Antônio José Rondinelli Tobias
- Date of birth: April 26, 1954 (age 72)
- Place of birth: São José do Rio Pardo, Brazil
- Position: Central defender

Senior career*
Years	Team	Apps	(Gls)
1971–1981	Flamengo	116	(2)
1981	Corinthians	12	(0)
1982–1983	Vasco	14	(1)
1984	Atlético-PR	5	(0)
1985	Paysandu	2	(0)
1986	Bonsucesso	–	(–)

Managerial career
- Vila Nova
- CFZ do Rio
- * Club domestic league appearances and goals

Antônio José Rondinelli Tobias, usually known as Rondinelli (born April 26, 1954 in São José do Rio Pardo, São Paulo), is a retired professional association footballer who played as a central defender.

== Playing career ==
Rondinelli started his career playing for Flamengo, where he played 394 matches and scored 14 goals from 1974 to 1981, winning during that time period the Campeonato Carioca in 1974, 1978, and the two 1979 championships, and the Campeonato Brasileiro Série A in 1980. In 1978, he won the Placar's Campeonato Brasileiro Série A Bola de Prata award. While playing for Flamengo, he was nicknamed Deus da Raça ("God of Determination") by the club's supporters, due to his will to win.

== National team ==
He played three unofficial matches for the Brazil national team, one match in 1979, against the Bahia State Combined Team, and two matches in 1980, against the Brazil Youth Team and the Minas Gerais State Combined Team, drawing the first match, and winning the other two.

== Managerial career ==
After retiring, Rondinelli started a managerial career. Among the clubs he managed are Vila Nova, of Goiás state, and CFZ do Rio, of Rio de Janeiro state.

== Personal life ==
Rondinelli has one son, and two daughters. His son, Antônio José Rondinelli Tobias Júnior, born in 1979 in Rio de Janeiro, is also a footballer. Rio de Janeiro is also the birthplace of his wife. Rondinelli opened a football academy in his home city, São José do Rio Pardo, named Deus da Raça.

== Documentary ==
In 2003, a documentary telling Rondinelli's story, directed and written by Felipe Nepomuceno and Pedro Asbeg, and produced by Raça Filmes, which is a company based in Rio de Janeiro city, was released. While the Portuguese-language name of the documentary is O Deus da Raça, its English-language name is Our God.

== Honors ==
Besides winning the Bola de Prata in 1978, Rondinelli won the following honors during his playing career:

Club	Competition	Seasons
Flamengo	Campeonato Brasileiro Série A	1980
Flamengo	Campeonato Carioca	1974, 1978, 1979, 1979 (special competition)
