= Baroninho =

Brazilian footballer

Personal information
- Full name: Edílson Guimarães Baroni
- Date of birth: 18 January 1958 (age 68)
- Place of birth: Bauru, Brazil
- Height: 1.72 m (5 ft 8 in)
- Position: Left winger

Youth career
- Noroeste

Senior career*
Years	Team	Apps	(Gls)
1977–1978	Noroeste		
1978–1981	Palmeiras	159	(31)
1981–1982	Flamengo	50	(9)
1982–1983	Palmeiras	36	(1)
1983	América-SP		
1984	Inter de Limeira		
1985	Matsubara		
1986	Sertãozinho		
1986	Botafogo-SP		
1987–1988	Noroeste		
1989	Botafogo-SP		
1990	Lençoense		
1991	Fernandópolis		
1992	Ferroviária		
1992–1993	Sampaio Corrêa		

International career
1977	Brazil U20	4	(0)

Managerial career
- 2010: Varginha
- 2011: Paulista (U20)
- 2015: Santo André (U20)
- 2016: XV de Jaú
- * Club domestic league appearances and goals as of 19 January 2024

Edílson Guimarães Baroni (born 18 January 1958), better known as Baroninho, is a Brazilian former professional footballer who played as a left winger.

== Career ==
Left winger, Baroninho began his career at his hometown club, EC Noroeste, later playing for Palmeiras, where he was the team's main player in 1979, and for Flamengo, champion of the Libertadores and World Cup in 1981. He played for other teams, but without achieving the success at the beginning of his career. He also trained some teams, especially in the youth sectors.

== Honours ==
Flamengo

- Intercontinental Cup: 1981
- Copa Libertadores: 1981
- Campeonato Carioca: 1981
- Taça Guanabara: 1981
