= Adílio (footballer, born 1956) =

Brazilian footballer (1956–2024)

- Adílio in 1986 for Flamengo

Personal information
- Full name: Adílio de Oliveira Gonçalves
- Date of birth: 15 May 1956
- Place of birth: Rio de Janeiro, Brazil
- Date of death: 5 August 2024 (aged 68)
- Place of death: Rio de Janeiro, Brazil
- Position: Midfielder

Senior career*
Years	Team	Apps	(Gls)
1975–1987	Flamengo	177	(26)
1987–1988	Coritiba	11	(0)
1989–1990	Barcelona de Guayaquil		
1991	Itumbiara		
1991	Inter de Lages	1	(0)
1991–1992	Alianza Lima		
1993	Santos-ES		
1994	América de Três Rios		
1995	Bacabal		
1995	Serrano		
1995–1996	Barreira		
1996	Borussia Fulda		
1996	Friburguense		
1997	Barra Mansa		

International career
1979–1982	Brazil	2	(0)

Managerial career
- Bahain
- CFZ
- 2003–2007: Flamengo
- 2006: Flamengo
- * Club domestic league appearances and goals

Adílio de Oliveira Gonçalves (15 May 1956 – 5 August 2024), usually known simply as Adílio, was a Brazilian professional footballer who played as a midfielder. Considered one of the greatest players in Flamengo's history, he made two appearances for the Brazil national team.

== Club career ==
Born in Rio de Janeiro, he was a talented midfielder who played for Flamengo between 1975 and 1987, and was a key part of the club's golden generation. During those years, he won virtually every competition he played in: the Rio State Championship in 1978, 1979 (twice), 1981 and 1986; the Brasileiro Série A in 1980, 1982, 1983 and 1987; the 1981 Libertadores Cup (Flamengo's first), and the Intercontinental Cup, when he scored one of the goals of Flamengo's 3–0 victory against Liverpool. Adílio played 181 Série A matches for Flamengo, scoring 26 goals, and played 11 Série A games for Coritiba, without scoring a goal.

After leaving Flamengo, Adílio had spells with clubs in Brazil, Peru, Ecuador and Germany, including Coritiba, Barcelona de Guayaquil, Alianza Lima and Borussia Fulda.

Having played 611 matches for Flamengo, Adílio ranked third in all-time appearances for the club.

== International career ==
Adílio played two games for the Brazil national team. The first game was played on 5 July 1979, against a Bahia state combined team, while the last game was played on 21 March 1982, against West Germany.

== Managerial career ==
After retiring from playing, Adílio devoted himself to coaching, first taking a role with Saudi Bahain. Soon after, Adílio took charge of CFZ, the football school founded by his former teammate Zico.

In 2003, the former player accepted an invitation from Flamengo to coach in the club's youth academy, and was highly regarded for his achievements with the club's youth players. During Adílio's four years in charge, the youth team won the Rio State Championship, two OPG Cups, the Rio-São Paulo Cup and the Belo Horizonte Cup, placing third at the Youth World Cup in Malaysia. He also helped develop important players such as Renato Augusto, Erick Flores, Thiago Sales, and midfielder Rômulo.

In 2006, Adílio was promoted to coach Flamengo's first team, which had narrowly avoided relegation in 2005 thanks to the efforts of Joel Santana. After just two games in charge, Adílio returned to coaching in the club's youth academy.

In 2008, after some time away from coaching, Adílio was succeeded by Rogério Lourenço.

== Illness and death ==
On 2 August 2024, it was announced that Adílio had been diagnosed with pancreatic cancer. He died in Rio de Janeiro three days later, on 5 August, at the age of 68.

== Honours ==
Flamengo

- Campeonato Carioca: 1978, 1979, 1979 (extra), 1981, 1986
- Campeonato Brasileiro Série A: 1980, 1982, 1983
- Copa União: 1987
- Copa Libertadores: 1981
- Intercontinental Cup: 1981

Individual

- Bola de Prata: 1977, 1978
