= Andrade (footballer, born 1957) =

Brazilian footballer

Personal information
- Full name: Jorge Luís Andrade da Silva
- Date of birth: 21 April 1957 (age 69)
- Place of birth: Juiz de Fora, Brazil
- Position: Defensive midfielder

Team information
- Current team: (head coach)

Youth career
- 1974–1976: Flamengo

Senior career*
Years	Team	Apps	(Gls)
1977–1988	Flamengo	160	(7)
1978–1979	→ ULA Mérida (loan)	?	(23)
1988–1989	Roma	9	(0)
1989–1990	Vasco da Gama	19	(0)
1991	Inter de Lages	33	(4)
1991	Atlético Paranaense	4	(0)
1992–1993	Desportiva	11	(0)
1994	Linhares	0	(0)
1994	CEOV	0	(0)
1995	Barreira	0	(0)
1995	Bacabal-MA	0	(0)
1996–1998	Barreira	0	(0)
1999	Bangu	0	(0)
Total		236	(11)

International career
1983–1989	Brazil	11	(1)

Managerial career
- 2004: CFZ
- 2004: Flamengo (caretaker)
- 2005: Flamengo (caretaker)
- 2009–2010: Flamengo
- 2010: Brasiliense
- 2011: Paysandu
- 2012: Boavista
- 2014: São João da Barra
- 2015: Jacobina
Medal record
Men's football
Representing Brazil
Olympic Games
Silver medal – second place	1988 Seoul	Team competition
- * Club domestic league appearances and goals

Jorge Luís Andrade da Silva (born 21 April 1957), known as Andrade, is a Brazilian professional football coach and former player who played as a defensive midfielder. He spent the majority of his career for Flamengo in the 1970s and '80s, where he won several trophies, including four national championships and the Copa Libertadores.

As a coach, Andrade won the 2009 Campeonato Brasileiro with Flamengo.

== Career ==
From 1977 to 1987 he played for Flamengo, taking part in the club's Golden Age and winning four Rio de Janeiro State Championships, three Brazilian Championships (1980, 1982, 1983), the 1981 Copa Libertadores and the 1981 Intercontinental Cup.

With 569 matches for Flamengo, Andrade has the 5th most appearances for the club.

Soon after his glorious era in Flamengo, he moved to AS Roma and then Vasco da Gama winning the 1989 Brazilian Championship. In the early 1980s he played for the Brazil national football team.

At international level, Andrade represented the Brazil national football team at the 1983 Copa América; he also won a silver medal in the 1988 Summer Olympics.

Andrade and Zinho are the only Brazilian players who have won four national titles.

After a period as Flamengo's assistant coach, including working as interim coach in four occasions, Andrade finally had a chance as head coach replacing Cuca, sacked by the club's directors, and won the 2009 Brazilian Championship, after 17 years of Flamengo's waiting.

=== International goals ===
Scores and results list Brazil's goal tally first.

No	Date	Venue	Opponent	Score	Result	Competition
1.	3 August 1988	Praterstadion, Vienna, Austria	Austria	2–0	2–0	Friendly

== Career statistics ==
=== Coaching ===
As of April 22, 2010

Nat	Team	Season	Record							
Nat	Team	Season	G	W	L	D	Win %	GF	GA	+/-
(Brazil)	Flamengo	2009	27	15	7	5	64.2	37	26	+11
(Brazil)	Flamengo	2010	24	17	3	4	75	57	27	+30
Total			51	32	10	9	69.3	94	53	+41

== Honors ==
As a Player
Flamengo

- Campeonato Brasileiro Série A: 3

1980, 1982, 1983

- Copa União Green Module: 1

1987

- Copa Libertadores: 1

1981

- Copa Intercontinental: 1

1981

- Campeonato Carioca: 4

1978, 1979, 1981, 1986

Vasco

- Campeonato Brasileiro Série A: 1

1989

As a Coach
Flamengo

- Campeonato Brasileiro Série A: 1

2009
