= Tita (footballer, born 1958) =

Brazilian footballer and manager

Personal information
- Full name: Milton Queiroz da Paixão
- Date of birth: 1 April 1958 (age 68)
- Place of birth: Rio de Janeiro, Brazil
- Height: 1.74 m (5 ft 9 in)
- Positions: Attacking midfielder; forward

Senior career*
Years	Team	Apps	(Gls)
1977–1982	Flamengo	78	(22)
1983	Grêmio	18	(12)
1983–1985	Flamengo	23	(7)
1985–1986	Internacional	17	(7)
1987	Vasco da Gama	-	(-)
1987–1988	Bayer Leverkusen	21	(10)
1988–1989	Pescara	27	(9)
1989–1990	Vasco da Gama	7	(2)
1990–1994	León	115	(54)
1994–1995	Puebla	21	(8)
1995–1996	León	42	(27)
1997–1998	Comunicaciones	11	(6)

International career
1979–1990	Brazil	32	(6)

Managerial career
- 2000: Vasco da Gama
- 2001: Americano
- 2002: Urawa Red Diamonds
- 2002: El Paso Patriots
- 2003: América (RJ)
- 2004: Bangu
- 2005: Caxias
- 2005: Remo
- 2006: CFZ do Rio
- 2006: Resende
- 2007: Tupi
- 2007: Macaé
- 2008: Vasco da Gama
- 2009: América de Natal
- 2010: Volta Redonda
- 2010–2011: León
- 2012: Necaxa
- 2016: Macaé
- 2016: Macaé
- * Club domestic league appearances and goals

Milton Queiroz da Paixão, simply known as Tita (born 1 April 1958), is a Brazilian former association footballer who played as a forward. He played for the Brazil national team and played for several Campeonato Brasileiro Série A clubs. After retiring, he started a managerial career.

== Personal life ==
He is a member of the Church of Jesus Christ of Latter-day Saints.

== Playing career ==
He was capped 32 times for the national team, between August 1979 and May 1990, scoring six goals. He played 391 games and scored 135 goals for Flamengo. With Bayer Leverkusen, he won the UEFA Cup in 1988. He scored in the second leg of the final against Espanyol, one of three goals needed to equal a 3–0 deficit.

== Managerial career ==
Tita has also managed several different clubs. In 2008, he was Vasco da Gama's manager from August to September.

== Managerial statistics ==
Team	From	To	Record				
Team	From	To	G	W	D	L	Win %
Urawa Reds	2001	2001	18	8	1	9	44.44
Total			18	8	1	9	44.44

== Honours ==
=== Club ===
Flamengo

- Campeonato Carioca: 1978, 1979, 1979 Special, 1981
- Campeonato Brasileiro: 1980, 1982
- Copa Libertadores: 1981
- Intercontinental Cup: 1981

Gremio

- Copa Libertadores: 1983

Vasco

- Campeonato Carioca: 1987
- Campeonato Brasileiro: 1989

Bayer Leverkusen

- UEFA Cup: 1987–88

Club León

- Mexican League: 1992

=== International ===
Brazil

- Copa América: 1989; runner-up: 1983
- Pan American Games Football Tournament: 1987
- FIFA World Cup – Round of 16: 1990
- Mundialito runner-up: 1980
