= Cláudio Coutinho =

Brazilian football manager and coach

Personal information
- Full name: Cláudio Pêcego de Moraes Coutinho
- Date of birth: 5 January 1939
- Place of birth: Brazil
- Date of death: 27 November 1981 (aged 42)

Managerial career
- Years: Team
- 1977–1980: Brazil
- 1978–1980: Flamengo
- 1981: Los Angeles Aztecs
Medal record
Men's football
Representing Brazil (as manager)
FIFA World Cup
Bronze medal – third place	1978

Cláudio Pêcego de Moraes Coutinho (5 January 1939 – 27 November 1981) was a Brazilian football manager who coached Brazil from 1977 to 1980 and Los Angeles Aztecs in 1981. He died as a result of a scuba diving accident at Rio de Janeiro.

== Military career ==
Born in the small town of Dom Pedrito in Rio Grande do Sul on the border with Uruguay, Coutinho moved to Rio de Janeiro when he was four years old.

Living in Rio, Coutinho joined the Military School, and would ultimately reach the rank of Captain of Artillery. On the other hand, he also showed great interest to the sports area, graduating from the School of Physical Education of the Army.

In 1968, he was chosen to represent their school in a World Congress, held in the United States. There he met American professor Kenneth H. Cooper, founder of the Cooper test. Invited by Cooper, Coutinho attended the NASA Human Stress Laboratory.

== Sports career ==
In 1970 Coutinho was appointed as physical fitness coach for the Brazilian team in preparation for the 1970 FIFA World Cup in Mexico; it was during this time that Coutinho introduced the Cooper method to the Brazilian team. After the competition, he would become supervisor for the Peru national football team, technical coordinator of Brazil's World Cup team in 1974, the French team Olympique de Marseille and the Brazilian Olympic Team, taking it to fourth place in the 1976 Summer Olympics. In the same year, he became head coach of Flamengo.

Coutinho's relatively good performance in these roles, and his history with the Brazilian Confederation of Sports, gave him the credentials to be a substitute for Osvaldo Brandão within the Brazilian National Soccer Team, and he would eventually apply for the vacant head coach position in anticipation the 1978 FIFA World Cup in Argentina. His selection caused some surprise, as he was considered inexperienced for the job. Soon he took command, and tried to implement his own philosophy. The failure of the 1974 World Cup team, together with other factors, led many to conclude that the Brazilian method of play, based on individualism and star players, was outdated and that the important thing was now the European model, where players worked together like cogs in a machine. Coutinho attempted to implement a style modelled on the Total Football philosophy used by Rinus Michels' Dutch national side, who knocked Brazil out of the 1974 tournament with a 2–0 victory in the second group stage. Coutinho joined Los Angeles Aztecs as manager in 1981.

== Death ==
At the end of the 1981 season, Coutinho was on vacation in Rio de Janeiro, before leaving to take a position in Saudi Arabia. An expert diver, Coutinho was diving near the Ilhas Cagarras, an archipelago near Ipanema Beach, when he drowned at age 42.
