= Carlos Mozer =

Brazilian footballer and coach (born 1960)

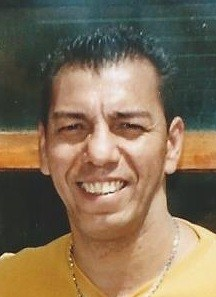
- Mozer in 2005

Personal information
- Full name: José Carlos Nepomuceno Mozer
- Date of birth: 19 September 1960 (age 66)
- Place of birth: Rio de Janeiro, Brazil
- Height: 1.87 m (6 ft 2 in)
- Position: Centre back

Senior career*
Years	Team	Apps	(Gls)
1980–1987	Flamengo	89	(8)
1987–1989	Benfica	61	(8)
1989–1992	Marseille	89	(4)
1992–1995	Benfica	59	(3)
1995–1996	Kashima Antlers	17	(0)
Total		315	(23)

International career
1983–1994	Brazil	32	(0)

Managerial career
- 2006–2008: Interclube
- 2009: Raja Casablanca
- 2011: Naval
- 2011–2012: Portimonense
- * Club domestic league appearances and goals

José Carlos Nepomuceno Mozer (born 19 September 1960) is a Brazilian former professional footballer who played as a central defender, and is a manager.

In his career, he was mainly associated with Benfica in Portugal, which he represented in two separate spells. He also spent three years with French club Marseille.

Mozer appeared for Brazil at the 1983 Copa América and the 1990 World Cup.

== Club career ==
Born in Rio de Janeiro, Mozer starting playing for local Clube de Regatas do Flamengo, which he helped win the Copa Libertadores and the Intercontinental Cup, both in 1981. After well more than 100 official appearances he left for Portugal and S.L. Benfica, being an undisputed starter from the beginning and helping the club to the Primeira Liga in 1988–89 while scoring more than ten overall goals in his first stint; also that season, he partnered compatriot Ricardo Gomes in the heart of the defence.

Mozer was sold to Olympique de Marseille in 1989 for a transfer fee of 25 million francs, with his agent Manuel Barbosa reportedly securing a commission of up to 15%. He faced his former side in the campaign's European Cup semifinals, a 2–2 controversial aggregate exit – again, he rarely missed a game, and helped L'OM to three consecutive Ligue 1 conquests.

Subsequently, the 32-year-old Mozer returned to Benfica, where he still managed to amass more than 75 overall appearances until his departure in 1995, after which he saw out his career in Japan at Kashima Antlers. He was the first player to score in penalty shootouts in two European Cup finals, in 1988 and 1991.

== International career ==
Mozer played 32 times for Brazil, over roughly ten years. He made his senior international debut on 28 July 1983, in a 0–0 friendly draw against Chile. He was a member of the team that finished second in the Copa América later that year, appearing in the 3–1 aggregate defeat to Uruguay in the final. After missing the 1986 FIFA World Cup through injury, he was picked for the 1990 edition in Italy; he was booked in the first two group stage matches (both wins), and did not appear in the round of 16 against Argentina, a 1–0 elimination.

Originally selected for the 1994 World Cup as well, Mozer was diagnosed with jaundice, left out of the squad and replaced with Aldair. His final appearance came as a substitute in a friendly match earlier that same year, a 2–0 win against rivals Argentina on 24 March.

== Managerial career ==
After working some years as a sports commentator for Sport TV – he resided in Portugal– Mozer eventually became a manager. On 24 October 2006, he signed a two-year contract with Angolan club G.D. Interclube, leading them to the 2007 Girabola title but being dismissed from his post in April 2008 after a 3–0 away defeat against Zamalek SC in the second round of the CAF Champions League.

On 6 July 2009, Mozer agreed to a one-year deal with Raja Casablanca of Morocco, being sacked shortly after. In December 2010 he returned to Portugal, becoming Associação Naval 1º de Maio's third coach in only 14 matches, with the Figueira da Foz team eventually ranking last in the league; in early November 2011 he was appointed at the other side that had suffered top-level relegation, Portimonense SC.

== Career statistics ==
=== Club ===
Appearances and goals by club, season and competition
Club	Season	League		
Club	Season	Division	Apps	Goals
Flamengo	1980	Série A	0	0
Flamengo	1981	Série A	3	0
Flamengo	1982	Série A	17	1
Flamengo	1983	Série A	10	1
Flamengo	1984	Série A	18	3
Flamengo	1985	Série A	17	1
Flamengo	1986	Série A	24	2
Flamengo	Total		89	8
Benfica	1987–88	Primeira Liga	32	6
Benfica	1988–89	Primeira Liga	29	2
Benfica	Total		61	8
Marseille	1989–90	Ligue 1	27	4
Marseille	1990–91	Ligue 1	31	0
Marseille	1991–92	Ligue 1	31	0
Marseille	Total		89	4
Benfica	1992–93	Primeira Liga	13	0
Benfica	1993–94	Primeira Liga	29	3
Benfica	1994–95	Primeira Liga	17	0
Benfica	Total		59	3
Kashima Antlers	1995	J1 League	15	0
Kashima Antlers	1996	J1 League	2	0
Kashima Antlers	Total		17	0
Total			315	23

=== International ===
Appearances and goals by national team and year
National team	Year	Apps	Goals
Brazil	1983	9	0
Brazil	1984	3	0
Brazil	1985	6	0
Brazil	1986	5	0
Brazil	1987	0	0
Brazil	1988	0	0
Brazil	1989	2	0
Brazil	1990	4	0
Brazil	1991	0	0
Brazil	1992	1	0
Brazil	1993	1	0
Brazil	1994	1	0
Total		32	0

== Honours ==
=== Player ===
Flamengo

- Campeonato Carioca: 1981, 1986
- Copa Libertadores: 1981
- Intercontinental Cup: 1981
- Campeonato Brasileiro Série A: 1982, 1983

Benfica

- Primeira Liga: 1988–89, 1993–94
- Taça de Portugal: 1992–93; Runner-up 1988–89
- European Cup runner-up: 1987–88

Marseille

- Ligue 1: 1989–90, 1990–91, 1991–92
- Coupe de France runner-up: 1990–91
- European Cup runner-up: 1990–91

Kashima Antlers

- J1 League: 1996

Individual

- Onze de Onze: 1989, 1990

=== Manager ===
Interclube

- Girabola: 2007
