= Serrano Football Club =

Association football club in Brazil

Serrano
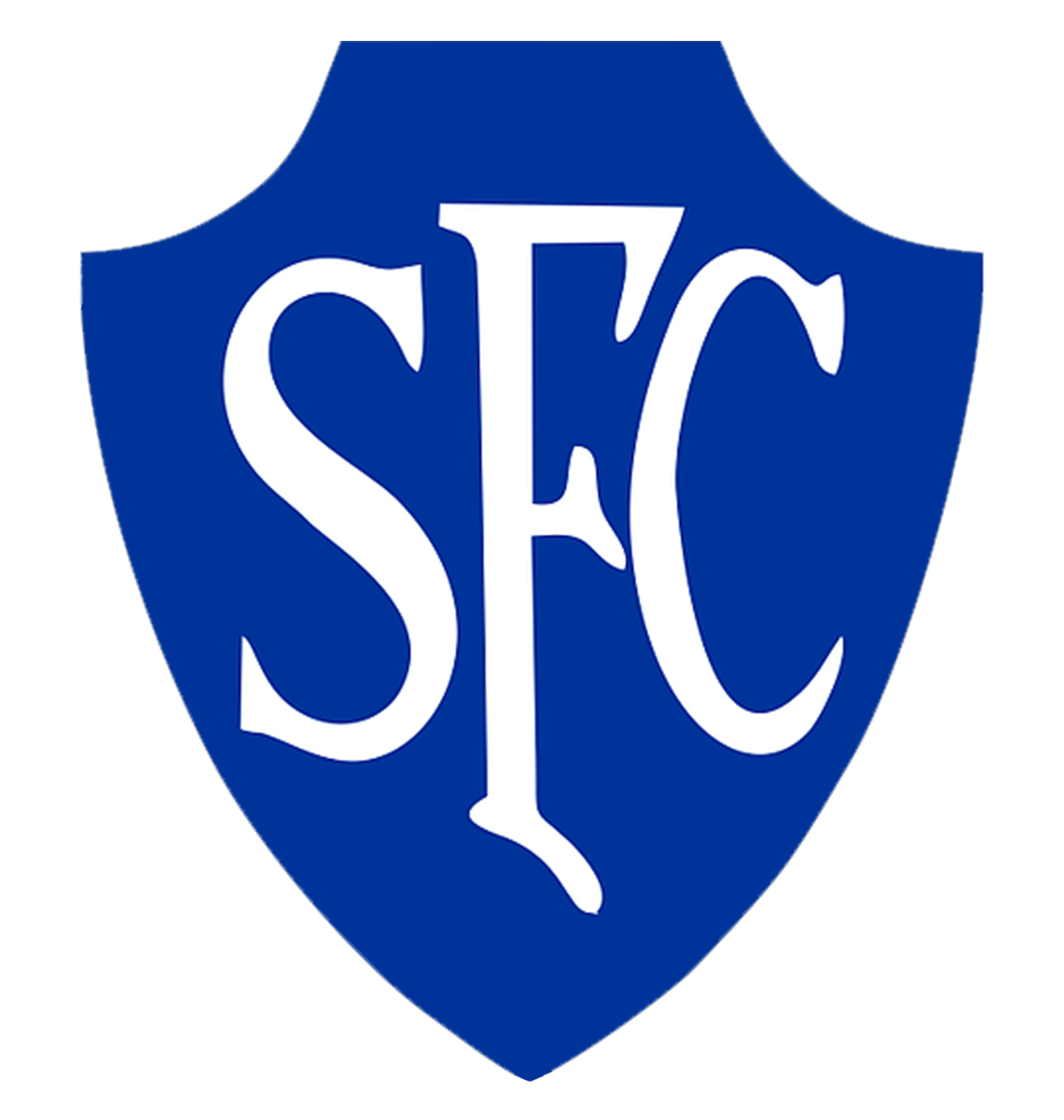
- Full name: Serrano Football Club
- Nicknames: Leão da Serra; Azulão
- Founded: 29 June 1915; 110 years ago
- Ground: Estádio Atílio Marotti
- Capacity: 8.000
- President: Alexandre Beck
- Head coach: Maurinho
- League: Campeonato Carioca Série B1
- 2024: Carioca Série B1, 8th of 9
| Home colours | Away colours |

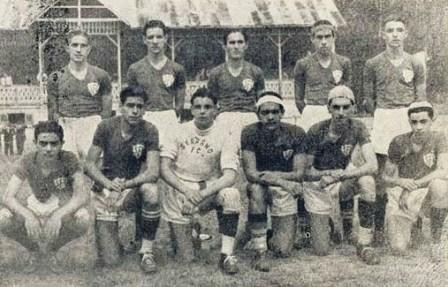
Team photo from the 1915 season

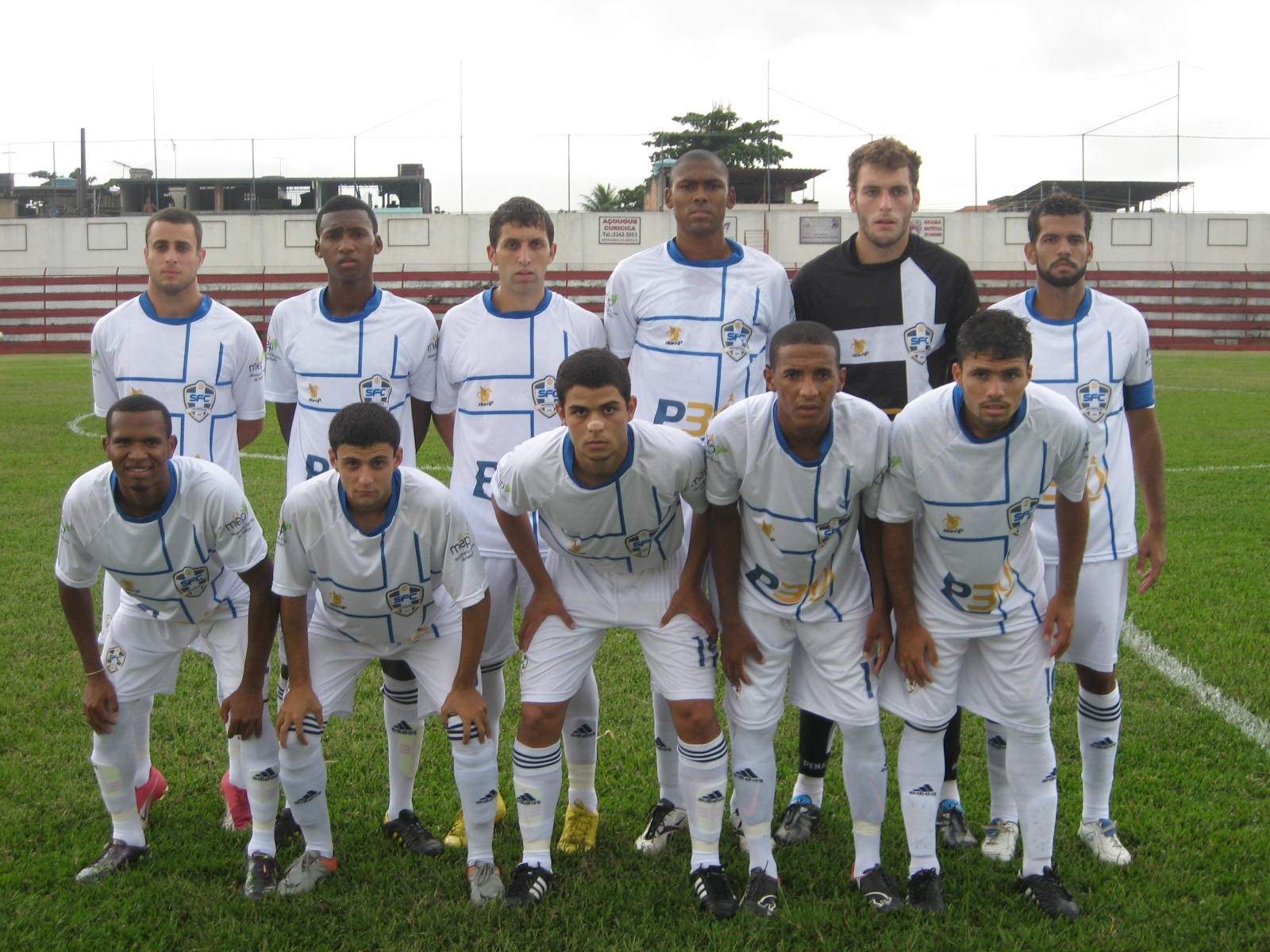
Team photo from the 2011 season

Serrano Football Club, usually known simply as Serrano, is a Brazilian football team from the city of Petrópolis, Rio de Janeiro state.

== History ==
The club was founded on 29 June 1915. It was Garrincha's first professional team.

== Honours ==
=== State ===
- Campeonato Fluminense
  - Winners (2): 1925, 1945
- Campeonato Carioca Série A2
  - Winners (2): 1992, 1999
- Campeonato Carioca Série B1
  - Winners (1): 2025

=== City ===
- Campeonato Citadino de Petrópolis
  - Winners (12): 1918, 1919, 1920, 1930, 1931, 1932, 1933, 1936, 1939, 1945, 1957, 1967

== Stadium ==
The home stadium Estádio Atílio Marotti has a capacity of 8,000 people.

== Colors ==
The official colors are blue and white.

== Club kits ==
The home kit is a blue shirt, white shorts and blue socks. The away kit is a white shirt, blue shorts and white socks.

== Mascot ==
The team's mascot is a lion dressed in the team's kit named Leão da Serra (in English, Mountain Lion).
