= 1983 Campeonato Brasileiro Série A =

Campeonato Brasileiro Série A
- Season: 1983
- Champions: Flamengo (3rd title)
- Copa Libertadores: Grêmio (title holders); Flamengo; Santos
- Matches: 322
- Goals: 868 (2.7 per match)
- Top goalscorer: Serginho Chulapa (Santos) - 22 goals
- Biggest home win: Corinthians 10-1 Tiradentes-PI (February 9, 1983)
- Biggest away win: Tiradentes-PI 0-6 Palmeiras (March 30, 1983)
- Highest scoring: Corinthians 10-1 Tiradentes-PI (February 9, 1983)
- Average attendance: 22,953

The 1983 Campeonato Brasileiro Série A was the 27th edition of the Campeonato Brasileiro Série A.

== Overview ==
It was contested by 44 teams, and Flamengo won the championship.

== First phase ==
=== Group A ===
Pos	Team	Pld	W	D	L	GF	GA	GD	Pts	Qualification
1	(São Paulo (state)) Santos	8	6	1	1	17	8	+9	13	Second phase
2	(Rio de Janeiro (state)) Flamengo	8	5	2	1	24	11	+13	12	Second phase
3	(Amazonas (Brazilian state)) Rio Negro	8	2	2	4	4	15	−11	6	Second phase
4	(Pará) Paysandu	8	2	1	5	12	15	−3	5	Repechage
5	(Maranhão) Moto Club	8	0	4	4	6	14	−8	4	

=== Group B ===
Pos	Team	Pld	W	D	L	GF	GA	GD	Pts	Qualification
1	(São Paulo (state)) Ponte Preta	8	4	2	2	12	9	+3	10	Second phase
2	(Rio Grande do Sul) Grêmio	8	3	3	2	10	5	+5	9	Second phase
3	(Paraná (state)) Atlético-PR	8	3	2	3	12	11	+1	8	Second phase
4	(Rio de Janeiro (state)) Campo Grande	8	2	3	3	5	9	−4	7	Repechage
5	(Santa Catarina (state)) Joinville	8	2	2	4	7	12	−5	6	

=== Group C ===
Pos	Team	Pld	W	D	L	GF	GA	GD	Pts	Qualification
1	(São Paulo (state)) São Paulo	8	5	3	0	13	1	+12	13	Second phase
2	(Rio Grande do Norte) América-RN	8	4	1	3	7	9	−2	9	Second phase
3	Sergipe	8	3	2	3	9	12	−3	8	Second phase
4	(Pernambuco) Sport	8	2	3	3	10	10	0	7	Repechage
5	(Bahia) Galícia	8	0	3	5	2	9	−7	3	

=== Group D ===
Pos	Team	Pld	W	D	L	GF	GA	GD	Pts	Qualification
1	(São Paulo (state)) Corinthians	8	6	0	2	25	10	+15	12	Second phase
2	(Rio de Janeiro (state)) Fluminense	8	4	1	3	13	7	+6	9	Second phase
3	(Piauí) Tiradentes	8	4	1	3	11	21	−10	9	Second phase
4	(Alagoas) CSA	8	2	2	4	12	12	0	6	Repechage
5	(Ceará) Fortaleza	8	0	4	4	6	17	−11	4	

=== Group E ===
Pos	Team	Pld	W	D	L	GF	GA	GD	Pts	Qualification
1	(São Paulo (state)) Palmeiras	8	6	2	0	17	2	+15	14	Second phase
2	(Mato Grosso do Sul) Comercial-MS	8	4	2	2	9	7	+2	10	Second phase
3	Bahia	8	3	2	3	7	9	−2	8	Second phase
4	Goiás	8	2	1	5	7	12	−5	5	Repechage
5	(Mato Grosso) Mixto	8	1	1	6	7	17	−10	3	

=== Group F ===
Pos	Team	Pld	W	D	L	GF	GA	GD	Pts	Qualification
1	(Rio de Janeiro (state)) América-RJ	8	6	1	1	17	7	+10	13	Second phase
2	(Minas Gerais) Atlético Mineiro	8	5	2	1	13	5	+8	12	Second phase
3	(Goiás) Vila Nova	8	3	1	4	9	10	−1	7	Second phase
4	(São Paulo (state)) Juventus	8	1	3	4	5	10	−5	5	Repechage
5	(Espírito Santo) Rio Branco	8	1	1	6	5	16	−11	3	

=== Group G ===
Pos	Team	Pld	W	D	L	GF	GA	GD	Pts	Qualification
1	(São Paulo (state)) Ferroviária	8	5	2	1	10	4	+6	12	Second phase
2	(Paraná (state)) Colorado	8	4	2	2	9	4	+5	10	Second phase
3	(Rio Grande do Sul) Internacional	8	3	2	3	6	6	0	8	Second phase
4	(Rio de Janeiro (state)) Botafogo	8	2	2	4	7	9	−2	6	Repechage
5	(Federal District (Brazil)) Brasília	8	1	2	5	5	14	−9	4	

=== Group H ===
Pos	Team	Pld	W	D	L	GF	GA	GD	Pts	Qualification
1	(Pernambuco) Náutico	8	5	2	1	20	7	+13	12	Second phase
2	(Rio de Janeiro (state)) Vasco da Gama	8	4	4	0	14	4	+10	12	Second phase
3	(Minas Gerais) Cruzeiro	8	4	3	1	14	7	+7	11	Second phase
4	(Ceará) Ferroviário	8	1	1	6	5	17	−12	3	Repechage
5	(Paraíba) Treze	8	1	0	7	7	25	−18	2	

== Repechage ==
Home team	Score	Away team
Paysandu	1 – 3	Campo Grande
Sport	2 – 1	CSA
Goiás	3 – 2 (aet)	Juventus
Botafogo	3 – 1	Ferroviário

== Second phase ==
=== Group I ===
Pos	Team	Pld	W	D	L	GF	GA	GD	Pts	Qualification
1	(São Paulo (state)) Santos	6	2	4	0	15	7	+8	8	Third phase
2	(São Paulo (state)) Guarani	6	2	4	0	9	6	+3	8	Third phase
3	(Minas Gerais) Cruzeiro	6	2	2	2	7	10	−3	6	
4	(Mato Grosso do Sul) Comercial	6	0	2	4	7	15	−8	2	

=== Group J ===
Pos	Team	Pld	W	D	L	GF	GA	GD	Pts	Qualification
1	(Minas Gerais) Atlético Mineiro	6	3	2	1	11	7	+4	8	Third phase
2	(Pernambuco) Sport	6	2	2	2	7	6	+1	6	Third phase
3	(Rio Grande do Sul) Internacional	6	2	2	2	7	7	0	6	
4	(São Paulo (state)) Ponte Preta	6	1	2	3	6	11	−5	4	

=== Group K ===
Pos	Team	Pld	W	D	L	GF	GA	GD	Pts	Qualification
1	(São Paulo (state)) São Paulo	6	5	1	0	21	4	+17	11	Third phase
2	(Paraná (state)) Colorado	6	3	1	2	8	12	−4	7	Third phase
3	(Minas Gerais) Uberaba	6	1	1	4	9	14	−5	3	
4	(Goiás) Vila Nova	6	1	1	4	5	13	−8	3	

=== Group L ===
Pos	Team	Pld	W	D	L	GF	GA	GD	Pts	Qualification
1	(São Paulo (state)) Corinthians	6	2	4	0	7	3	+4	8	Third phase
2	(Rio de Janeiro (state)) Vasco da Gama	6	1	4	1	6	5	+1	6	Third phase
3	Bahia	6	1	4	1	3	3	0	6	
4	(Rio de Janeiro (state)) Campo Grande	6	1	2	3	5	10	−5	4	

=== Group M ===
Pos	Team	Pld	W	D	L	GF	GA	GD	Pts	Qualification
1	(São Paulo (state)) Palmeiras	6	3	3	0	17	5	+12	9	Third phase
2	(Rio de Janeiro (state)) Flamengo	6	3	2	1	12	7	+5	8	Third phase
3	(Rio de Janeiro (state)) Americano	6	1	4	1	5	7	−2	6	
4	(Piauí) Tiradentes	6	0	1	5	2	17	−15	1	

=== Group N ===
Pos	Team	Pld	W	D	L	GF	GA	GD	Pts	Qualification
1	(Rio de Janeiro (state)) América-RJ	6	3	2	1	12	10	+2	8	Third phase
2	(Rio Grande do Sul) Grêmio	6	2	3	1	13	7	+6	7	Third phase
3	(Rio de Janeiro (state)) Botafogo	6	2	3	1	12	7	+5	7	
4	Sergipe	6	1	0	5	9	22	−13	2	

=== Group O ===
Pos	Team	Pld	W	D	L	GF	GA	GD	Pts	Qualification
1	(São Paulo (state)) Ferroviária	6	3	3	0	10	3	+7	9	Third phase
2	(Paraná (state)) Atlético-PR	6	3	2	1	8	5	+3	8	Third phase
3	(São Paulo (state)) Botafogo-SP	6	3	1	2	4	3	+1	7	
4	(Rio Grande do Norte) América-RN	6	0	0	6	4	15	−11	0	

=== Group P ===
Pos	Team	Pld	W	D	L	GF	GA	GD	Pts	Qualification
1	Goiás	6	3	2	1	5	5	0	8	Third phase
2	(Pernambuco) Náutico	6	3	1	2	12	5	+7	7	Third phase
3	(Rio de Janeiro (state)) Fluminense	6	2	2	2	6	5	+1	6	
4	(Amazonas (Brazilian state)) Rio Negro	6	1	1	4	4	12	−8	3	

== Third phase ==
=== Group Q ===
Pos	Team	Pld	W	D	L	GF	GA	GD	Pts	Qualification
1	(São Paulo (state)) Santos	6	3	2	1	7	6	+1	8	Quarterfinals
2	(Rio de Janeiro (state)) Vasco da Gama	6	2	3	1	7	5	+2	7	Quarterfinals
3	(São Paulo (state)) Palmeiras	6	1	3	2	10	8	+2	5	
4	(Pernambuco) Náutico	6	1	2	3	7	12	−5	4	

=== Group R ===
Pos	Team	Pld	W	D	L	GF	GA	GD	Pts	Qualification
1	(Minas Gerais) Atlético Mineiro	6	5	1	0	12	3	+9	11	Quarterfinals
2	(Paraná (state)) Atlético-PR	6	2	2	2	7	8	−1	6	Quarterfinals
3	(Paraná (state)) Colorado	6	2	0	4	8	13	−5	4	
4	(Rio de Janeiro (state)) América-RJ	6	1	1	4	11	14	−3	3	

=== Group S ===
Pos	Team	Pld	W	D	L	GF	GA	GD	Pts	Qualification
1	(São Paulo (state)) São Paulo	6	3	1	2	12	9	+3	7	Quarterfinals
2	(Pernambuco) Sport	6	3	1	2	9	7	+2	7	Quarterfinals
3	(Rio Grande do Sul) Grêmio	6	2	3	1	14	11	+3	7	
4	(São Paulo (state)) Ferroviária	6	1	1	4	7	15	−8	3	

=== Group T ===
Pos	Team	Pld	W	D	L	GF	GA	GD	Pts	Qualification
1	(Rio de Janeiro (state)) Flamengo	6	3	2	1	11	6	+5	8	Quarterfinals
2	Goiás	6	2	3	1	7	7	0	7	Quarterfinals
3	(São Paulo (state)) Corinthians	6	2	2	2	10	10	0	6	
4	(São Paulo (state)) Guarani	6	0	3	3	3	8	−5	3	

== Quarterfinals ==
Team 1	Agg.	Team 2	1st leg	2nd leg
Goiás	2–2	Santos (Note: Santos qualified due to having a better performance in the Third phase.)	0–0	2–2
Sport	1-4	Atlético Mineiro	0–0	1-4
Vasco da Gama	2-3	Flamengo	1–2	1-1
Atlético-PR	3-1	São Paulo	2–1	1-0

== Semifinals ==
Team 1	Agg.	Team 2	1st leg	2nd leg
Santos	2-1	Atlético Mineiro	2–1	0-0
Flamengo	3–2	Atlético-PR	3–0	0–2

== Finals ==
=== First leg ===
22 May 1983

Santos (São Paulo (state))	2 – 1	(Rio de Janeiro (state)) Flamengo
Pita 25'; Serginho Chulapa 63'		Baltazar 67'

Morumbi, São Paulo (SP)
Attendance: 114,481
Referee: (São Paulo (state)) José de Assis Aragão

=== Second leg ===
29 May 1983

Flamengo (Rio de Janeiro (state))	3 – 0	(São Paulo (state)) Santos
Zico 1'; Leandro 39'; Adílio 89'

Maracanã, Rio de Janeiro (RJ)
Attendance: 155,523
Referee: (Rio de Janeiro (state)) Arnaldo Cézar Coelho

== Final standings ==
Pos	Team	Pld	W	D	L	GF	GA	GD	Pts
1	Flamengo	26	14	7	5	57	30	+27	35
2	Santos	26	13	10	3	45	28	+17	36
3	Atlético Mineiro	24	14	7	3	41	18	+23	35
4	Atlético Paranaense	24	11	6	7	32	28	+4	28
5	São Paulo	22	13	5	4	47	17	+30	31
6	Vasco da Gama	22	7	12	3	29	17	+12	26
7	Goiás	22	7	8	7	21	26	−5	22
8	Sport	22	7	7	8	27	27	0	21
9	Palmeiras	20	10	8	2	44	15	+29	28
10	Corinthians	20	10	6	4	42	23	+19	26
11	América-RJ	20	10	4	6	40	31	+9	24
12	Ferroviária	20	9	6	5	27	22	+5	24
13	Náutico	20	9	5	6	39	24	+15	23
14	Grêmio	20	7	9	4	37	23	+14	23
15	Colorado	20	9	3	8	25	29	−4	21
16	Guarani	12	2	7	3	12	14	−2	11
17	Cruzeiro	14	6	5	3	21	17	+4	17
18	Fluminense	14	6	3	5	19	12	+7	15
19	Internacional	14	5	4	5	13	13	0	14
20	Ponte Preta	14	5	4	5	18	20	−2	14
21	Bahia	14	4	6	4	10	12	−2	14
22	Botafogo	14	4	5	5	19	16	+3	13
23	Comercial-MS	14	4	4	6	16	22	−6	12
24	Campo Grande	14	3	5	6	10	19	−9	11
25	Vila Nova-GO	14	4	2	8	14	23	−9	10
26	Sergipe	14	4	2	8	18	34	−16	10
27	Tiradentes	14	4	2	8	13	38	−25	10
28	América-RN	14	4	1	9	11	24	−13	9
29	Rio Negro	14	3	3	8	8	27	−19	9
30	Botafogo-SP	6	3	1	2	4	3	+1	7
31	Americano	6	1	4	1	5	7	−2	6
32	Uberaba	6	1	1	4	9	14	−5	3
33	CSA	8	2	2	4	12	12	0	6
34	Paysandu	8	2	1	5	12	15	−3	5
35	Juventus	8	1	3	4	5	10	−5	5
36	Ferroviário-CE	8	1	1	6	5	17	−12	3
37	Joinville	8	2	2	4	7	12	−5	6
38	Brasília	8	1	2	5	5	14	−9	4
39	Moto Club	8	0	4	4	6	14	−8	4
40	Fortaleza	8	0	4	4	6	17	−11	4
41	Mixto	8	1	1	6	7	17	−10	3
42	Rio Branco	8	1	1	6	4	16	−12	3
43	Galícia	8	0	3	5	2	9	−7	3
44	Treze	8	1	0	7	7	25	−18	2

Source: rsssf.com
