= 1981 Campeonato Carioca =

Campeonato Carioca
- Season: 1981
- Champions: Flamengo
- Relegated: Serrano; Olaria
- Taça de Ouro: Fluminense; Flamengo; Vasco da Gama; Botafogo; Bangu
- Taça de Prata: América; Volta Redonda; Americano; Campo Grande
- Matches played: 201
- Goals scored: 488 (2.43 per match)
- Top goalscorer: Roberto Dinamite (Vasco da Gama) - 31 goals
- Biggest home win: Flamengo 7-0 Americano (June 3, 1981)
- Biggest away win: Americano 0-5 Vasco da Gama (September 24, 1981)
- Highest scoring: Flamengo 7-0 Americano (June 3, 1981); Flamengo 5-2 Campo Grande (June 21, 1981); Fluminense 5-2 Volta Redonda (September 16, 1981); Flamengo 6-1 Americano (November 10, 1981)

The 1981 edition of the Campeonato Carioca kicked off on May 23, 1981 and ended on December 6, 1981. It is the official tournament organized by FFERJ (Federação de Futebol do Estado do Rio de Janeiro, or Rio de Janeiro State Football Federation. Only clubs based in the Rio de Janeiro State are allowed to play. Twelve teams contested this edition. Flamengo won the title for the 21st time. Serrano and Olaria were relegated.

== System ==
The tournament would be divided in four stages:

- Taça Guanabara: The twelve teams all played in a single round-robin format against each other. The champions qualified to the Final phase.
- Taça Ney Cidade Pinheiro: The twelve teams all played in a single round-robin format against each other. The champions qualified to the Final phase.
- Taça Sylvio Corrêa Pacheco: The twelve teams all played in a single round-robin format against each other. The champions qualified to the Final phase.
- Final phase: The champions of the two stages, plus the team with the best overall record would play that phase. In case one team won two rounds, an up-to-three match series against the other stage winner would be played: a tie favoured the team with the most stages won; in case of a loss, another match would be held under the same rules; if another loss occurred, another match would be held, and in case of another loss, the title would go to the team that had won only one stage.

== Championship ==
=== Taça Alfredo Curvelo ===
This tournament was played in late 1980, by the four teams that had been eliminated in the first round of the 1980 championship, and those that had been eliminated in the preliminary tournament of that year, to define the two teams that would play in the championship of 1981.

Pos	Team	Pld	W	D	L	GF	GA	GD	Pts	Qualification or relegation
1	Olaria	7	3	4	0	7	1	+6	10	Qualified
2	Madureira	7	3	4	0	6	1	+5	10	Qualified
3	Bonsucesso	7	4	1	2	14	7	+7	9	Relegated
4	Portuguesa	7	4	1	2	8	5	+3	9	Relegated
5	São Cristóvão	7	2	3	2	5	3	+2	7	Relegated
6	Goytacaz	7	2	1	4	4	7	−3	5	Relegated
7	Friburguense	7	1	1	5	6	11	−5	3	Relegated
8	Niterói	7	1	1	5	3	18	−15	3	Relegated

Updated to match(es) played on November 22, 1980. Source: RSSSF.com
Rules for classification: 1) points; 2) wins; 3) goal difference; 4) number of goals scored.

=== Taça Guanabara ===
Pos	Team	Pld	W	D	L	GF	GA	GD	Pts	Qualification or relegation
1	Flamengo	11	7	3	1	26	8	+18	17	Qualified to Final phase
2	América	11	6	4	1	12	4	+8	16	
3	Botafogo	11	4	7	0	10	5	+5	15	
4	Vasco da Gama	11	6	2	3	19	10	+9	14	
5	Bangu	11	2	8	1	12	12	0	12	
6	Campo Grande	11	4	3	4	16	17	−1	11	
7	Americano	11	2	6	3	9	16	−7	10	
8	Fluminense	11	2	5	4	12	18	−6	9	
9	Volta Redonda	11	2	4	5	13	18	−5	8	
10	Serrano	11	2	3	6	10	14	−4	7	
11	Olaria	11	2	3	6	7	12	−5	7	
12	Madureira	11	2	2	7	10	22	−12	6	

Updated to match(es) played on July 12, 1981. Source: RSSSF.com
Rules for classification: 1) points; 2) wins; 3) goal difference; 4) number of goals scored.

=== Taça Ney Cidade Palmeiro ===
Pos	Team	Pld	W	D	L	GF	GA	GD	Pts	Qualification or relegation
1	Vasco da Gama	11	9	2	0	26	8	+18	20	Qualified to Final phase
2	Flamengo	11	7	3	1	21	6	+15	17	
3	Botafogo	11	7	3	1	17	6	+11	17	
4	Bangu	11	6	2	3	13	12	+1	14	
5	Fluminense	11	6	1	4	18	15	+3	13	
6	América	11	5	3	3	14	11	+3	13	
7	Campo Grande	11	5	2	4	12	11	+1	12	
8	Volta Redonda	11	1	5	5	12	19	−7	7	
9	Serrano	11	1	4	6	7	13	−6	6	
10	Olaria	11	1	3	7	6	18	−12	5	
11	Americano	11	1	2	8	9	18	−9	4	
12	Madureira	11	0	4	7	4	22	−18	4	

Updated to match(es) played on September 27, 1981. Source: RSSSF.com
Rules for classification: 1) points; 2) wins; 3) goal difference; 4) number of goals scored.

=== Taça Sylvio Corrêa Pacheco ===
Pos	Team	Pld	W	D	L	GF	GA	GD	Pts	Qualification or relegation
1	Flamengo	10	8	2	0	34	5	+29	18 (Note: The November 22 match between Vasco and Flamengo wasn't held)	Qualified to Final phase
2	Vasco da Gama	10	6	3	1	20	10	+10	15	
3	Fluminense	11	6	2	3	23	15	+8	14	
4	Botafogo	11	6	2	3	17	13	+4	14	
5	Bangu	11	4	4	3	12	9	+3	12	
6	Americano	11	5	1	5	11	19	−8	11	
7	Madureira	11	4	3	4	9	16	−7	11	
8	Volta Redonda	11	3	4	4	13	17	−4	10	
9	Campo Grande	11	3	3	5	6	11	−5	9	
10	Serrano	11	2	3	6	9	15	−6	7	
11	América	11	2	3	6	8	18	−10	7	
12	Olaria	11	1	0	10	5	18	−13	2	

Updated to match(es) played on November 26, 1981. Source: RSSSF.com
Rules for classification: 1) points; 2) wins; 3) goal difference; 4) number of goals scored.

=== Aggregate table ===
Pos	Team	Pld	W	D	L	GF	GA	GD	Pts	Qualification or relegation
1	Flamengo	32	22	8	2	81	19	+62	52	Qualified to Final phase
2	Vasco da Gama	32	21	7	4	65	28	+37	49	Taça de Ouro
3	Botafogo	33	17	12	4	44	24	+20	46	Taça de Ouro
4	Bangu	33	12	14	7	37	33	+4	38	Taça de Ouro
5	Fluminense	33	14	8	11	53	48	+5	36	Taça de Ouro
6	América	33	13	10	10	34	33	+1	36	Taça de Prata
7	Campo Grande	33	12	8	13	34	39	−5	32	Taça de Prata
8	Americano	33	8	9	16	29	53	−24	25	Taça de Prata
9	Volta Redonda	33	6	13	14	38	54	−16	25	Taça de Prata
10	Madureira	33	6	9	18	23	60	−37	21	
11	Serrano	33	5	10	18	26	42	−16	20	Relegated
12	Olaria	33	4	6	23	18	48	−30	14	Relegated

Updated to match(es) played on November 21, 1982. Source: RSSSF.com
Rules for classification: 1) points; 2) wins; 3) goal difference; 4) number of goals scored.

=== Finals ===
29 November 1981 Final	Flamengo	0 – 2	Vasco da Gama	Maracanã, Rio de Janeiro
	Nunes (red card)		Roberto Dinamite 64', 77'; Marquinho (red card)	Attendance: 80,908; Referee: Alvimar Gaspar dos Reis

2 December 1981 Replay	Vasco da Gama	1 – 0	Flamengo	Maracanã, Rio de Janeiro
	Roberto Dinamite 88'; João Luis (red card)			Attendance: 45,704; Referee: Edson Alcantara do Amorim

6 December 1981 Replay	Flamengo	2 – 1	Vasco da Gama	Maracanã, Rio de Janeiro
	Adílio 20'; Nunes 24'		Ticão 83'	Attendance: 161,989; Referee: Alvimar Gaspar dos Reis
