= Leandro (footballer, born 1959) =

Brazilian footballer

Personal information
- Full name: José Leandro de Souza Ferreira
- Date of birth: 17 March 1959 (age 67)
- Place of birth: Cabo Frio, Brazil
- Height: 1.82 m (5 ft 11 1/2 in)
- Position: Right wing-back

Senior career*
Years	Team	Apps	(Gls)
1978–1990	Flamengo	119	(5)

International career
1981–1986	Brazil	27	(2)
- * Club domestic league appearances and goals

José Leandro de Souza Ferreira (born 17 March 1959), known as Leandro, is a Brazilian former footballer who played as a defender.

He played for Flamengo during his whole professional career, first as a right-sided full-back and, from 1983 on, as a central defender. He also played for the Brazil national team in the 1980s, including at the 1982 FIFA World Cup.

== Club career ==
Leandro spent his entire club career Flamengo, where he won four Brazilian national leagues, five Rio State championships, one Libertadores da América, and one Intercontinental Cup against Liverpool. In total, he played 417 matches and scored 14 goals for Flamengo.

== International career ==
Leandro was capped 27 times for Brazil between September 1981 and May 1986, scoring two goals. He took part at the 1982 FIFA World Cup, where he was part of a star-studded Brazilian team, along with Zico, Júnior, Falcão, Sócrates, and many others, including Éder and Toninho Cerezo. Despite the plethora of creative midfield talent in the team, and the exciting brand of attacking football that they displayed throughout the tournament, Brazil were eliminated in the second round, after placing second in the so-called "Group of Death" with rivals and defending champions Argentina, as well as the eventual champions Italy.

Leandro also took part at the 1983 Copa América, where Brazil finished in second place. A principled man, he refused to go to 1986 FIFA World Cup in Mexico, however, after a disagreement with the coach Telê Santana over the exclusion of his teammate Renato from the squad.

== After retirement ==
Leandro prematurely retired in 1990 at 31 years of age. He currently owns and manages a restaurant and hotel in his hometown Cabo Frio.

== Style of play ==
Considered one of the greatest Brazilian defenders of all-time, Leandro started his career as an offensive-minded right-sided full-back or wing-back. In this role, he was capable of delivering decisive crosses to the forwards, or indeed taking a shot at goal himself. He also had an ability to dribble past opposing players and get forward. Leandro was also able to cover the flank both offensively and defensively: he could often be found in the outside right position, yet would get back to defence when needed.

After several knee injuries and some surgeries in 1985, Leandro started to play as a centre-back, also achieving much success in this role, and was still called up to the Brazil national squad to play in this new position.

== Honours ==
=== Club ===
Flamengo

- Campeonato Carioca: 1978, 1979, 1979, 1981, 1986
- Campeonato Brasileiro Série A: 1980, 1982, 1983
- Copa União: 1987
- Intercontinental Cup: 1981
- Copa Libertadores: 1981
- Copa do Brasil: 1990

=== Individual ===
- Bola de Prata: 1982, 1985
