= Nunes (footballer, born 1954) =

Brazilian footballer

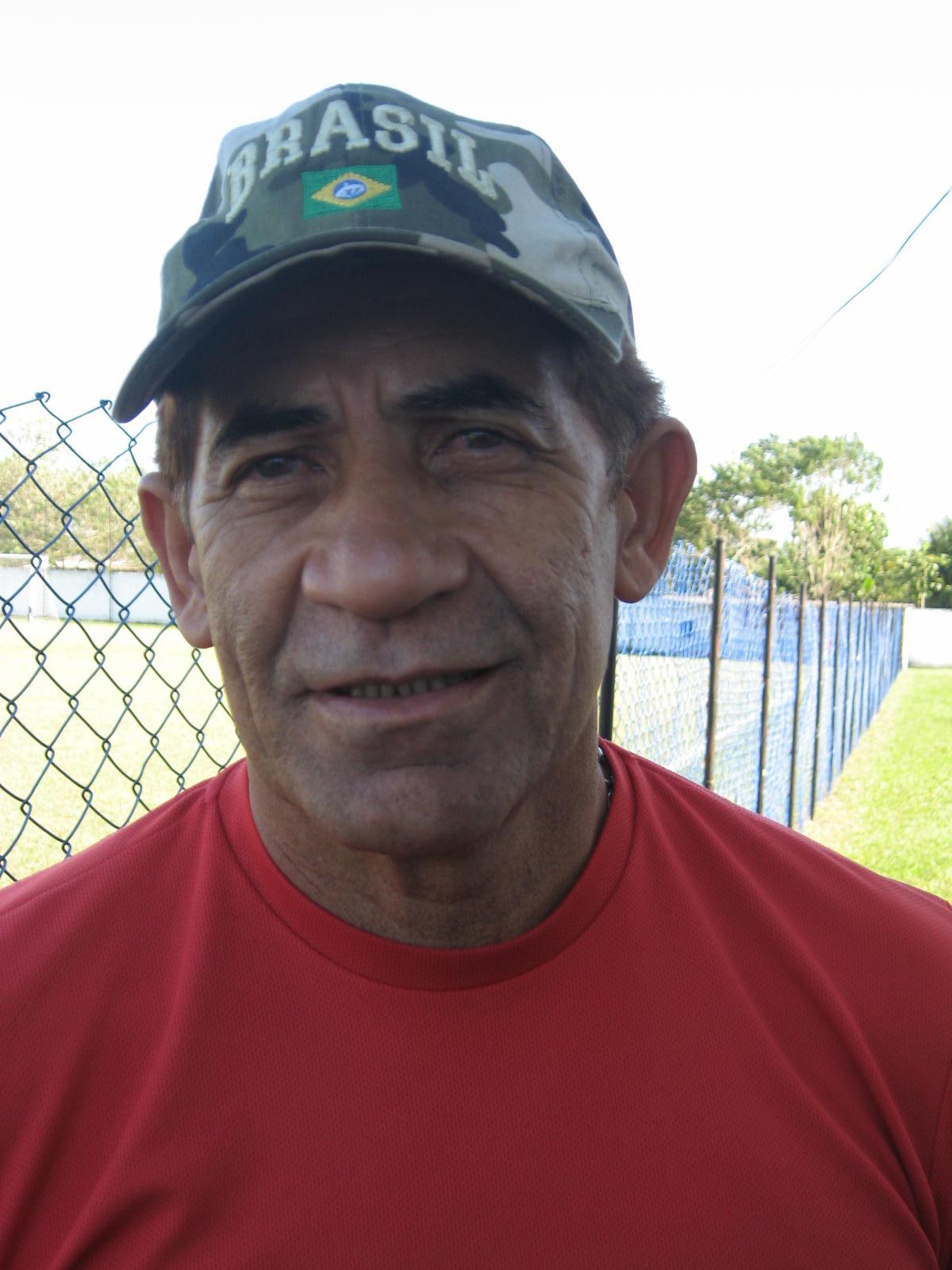
- Nunes in 2010

Personal information
- Full name: João Batista Nunes de Oliveira
- Date of birth: May 20, 1954 (age 72)
- Place of birth: Sergipe, Brazil
- Height: 1.78 m (5 ft 10 in)
- Position: Striker

Youth career
- 1967–1969: Fluminense de Feira
- 1969–1972: Flamengo

Senior career*
Years	Team	Apps	(Gls)
1973	Flamengo	0	(0)
1974–1975	Confiança	0	(0)
1975–1978	Santa Cruz	64	(37)
1978–1979	Fluminense	57	(40)
1979–1980	Monterrey	10	(7)
1980–1984	Flamengo	195	(93)
1984	Botafogo	7	(3)
1985	Nautico	17	(8)
1985	Santos	0	(0)
1986	Atletico Mineiro	58	(39)
1986–1987	Boavista	9	(4)
1987	Flamengo	17	(4)
1988	Volta Redonda	8	(1)
1988–1991	Tiburones Acajutla	0	(0)
1990	Flamengo	2	(2)
1991–1993	Santa Cruz	0	(0)
Total		444	(235)

International career
1978–1980	Brazil	6	(2)
- * Club domestic league appearances and goals

João Batista Nunes de Oliveira (born May 20, 1954 in Cedro de São João, SE), known as Nunes, is a former Brazilian football striker.

He became a football player in 1969, at 14 years old, playing for Flamengo's youth team. Reject by the club in 1974, at 19, he left Rio de Janeiro towards Aracaju (SE) to start his professional career at Confiança. His good performances granted him the 1976 Sergipe State Championship and a transference to Santa Cruz FC in the same year. There he won twice the Pernambuco State Championship (1976, 1978).

In 1977, he had his first cap for Brazil and became a regular in the National Team. Due to an injury, he was not selected to play the 1978 FIFA World Cup which made him miserable. Just after the World Cup, recovered from the injury, he returned to Rio de Janeiro to sign with Fluminense but he stayed there only for a few months before signing with Mexico's CF Monterrey.

Finally, in 1980, he transferred back to Flamengo to take part in a sensational team and make history as one of the most important forwards in the club's history. Once there he won two Brazilian National Championships (1980, 1982), the 1981 Libertadores Cup and the 1981 Intercontinental Cup.

In 1983 we went on a one-year-loan to Botafogo and in the following year he transferred from Flamengo to Náutico, where he won another Pernambuco State Championship (1985). He would briefly return to Flamengo once again in 1987 and, although not a regular starter, he was a member of the squad that won the Brazilian league again that year.

Nunes also played for Portugal's Boavista, Santos FC, Atlético Mineiro, Volta Redonda FC and El Salvador's Tiburones.

Nunes retired in 1993 after winning his 4th Pernambuco State Championship - the 3rd one playing for Santa Cruz.
