= 1982 Campeonato Brasileiro Série A =

Campeonato Brasileiro Série A
- Season: 1982
- Champions: Flamengo (2nd title)
- Copa Libertadores: Flamengo; Grêmio
- Matches: 291
- Goals: 803 (2.76 per match)
- Top goalscorer: Zico (Flamengo) - 21 goals
- Biggest home win: Guarani 8–0 River (4 February 1982)
- Biggest away win: Itabaiana 0–4 Fluminense (31 January 1982)
- Highest scoring: Guarani 8–1 Ceará (7 February 7 1982)
- Average attendance: 19,808

The 1982 Campeonato Brasileiro Série A, (officially the 1982 Taça de Ouro) was the 27th edition of the Campeonato Brasileiro Série A.

Locations of the 1982 Série A teams

== Overview ==
44 teams took part, with Flamengo winning the championship.

Locations of the 1982 Série A teams

== First phase ==
=== Group A ===
Pos	Team	Pld	W	D	L	GF	GA	GD	Pts	Qualification
1	(Rio de Janeiro (state)) Vasco da Gama	8	7	0	1	22	3	+19	14	Second phase
2	(São Paulo (state)) Santos	8	4	2	2	15	10	+5	10	Second phase
3	(Maranhão) Moto Club	8	2	3	3	5	14	−9	7	Second phase
4	(Pará) Paysandu	8	0	5	3	4	11	−7	5	Repechage
5	(Amazonas (Brazilian state)) Nacional-AM	8	0	4	4	5	13	−8	4	

=== Group B ===
Pos	Team	Pld	W	D	L	GF	GA	GD	Pts	Qualification
1	(São Paulo (state)) Guarani	8	7	1	0	32	8	+24	15	Second phase
2	(Rio de Janeiro (state)) Botafogo	8	5	1	2	16	9	+7	11	Second phase
3	Ceará	8	4	2	2	12	15	−3	10	Second phase
4	(Rio Grande do Norte) América-RN	8	2	0	6	8	16	−8	4	Repechage
5	(Piauí) River	8	0	0	8	6	26	−20	0	

=== Group C ===
Pos	Team	Pld	W	D	L	GF	GA	GD	Pts	Qualification
1	(Rio de Janeiro (state)) Flamengo	8	7	1	0	25	11	+14	15	Second phase
2	(São Paulo (state)) São Paulo	8	5	1	2	24	10	+14	11	Second phase
3	(Paraíba) Treze	8	2	2	4	6	17	−11	6	Second phase
4	(Pernambuco) Náutico	8	1	4	3	11	15	−4	6	Repechage
5	(Ceará) Ferroviário-CE	8	1	0	7	6	26	−20	2	

=== Group D ===
Pos	Team	Pld	W	D	L	GF	GA	GD	Pts	Qualification
1	(Pernambuco) Sport	8	6	1	1	15	5	+10	13	Second phase
2	(Rio de Janeiro (state)) Fluminense	8	3	4	1	14	7	+7	10	Second phase
3	(São Paulo (state)) Internacional de Limeira	8	2	4	2	13	10	+3	8	Second phase
4	(Alagoas) CSA	8	1	4	3	9	13	−4	6	Repechage
5	(Sergipe) Itabaiana	8	1	1	6	2	18	−16	3	

=== Group E ===
Pos	Team	Pld	W	D	L	GF	GA	GD	Pts	Qualification
1	(Rio de Janeiro (state)) Bangu	8	4	2	2	15	8	+7	10	Second phase
2	(Mato Grosso do Sul) Operário-MS	8	4	2	2	11	9	+2	10	Second phase
3	Bahia	8	3	4	1	9	6	+3	10	Second phase
4	(Minas Gerais) Cruzeiro	8	3	0	5	10	15	−5	6	Repechage
5	(Mato Grosso) Mixto	8	2	0	6	10	17	−7	4	

=== Group F ===
Pos	Team	Pld	W	D	L	GF	GA	GD	Pts	Qualification
1	(São Paulo (state)) São José	8	4	2	2	6	4	+2	10	Second phase
2	(Rio Grande do Sul) Grêmio	8	4	1	3	8	4	+4	9	Second phase
3	(Minas Gerais) Atlético Mineiro	8	3	3	2	11	5	+6	9	Second phase
4	(Espírito Santo) Desportiva	8	3	0	5	10	17	−7	6	Repechage
5	(Bahia) Vitória	8	3	0	5	7	12	−5	6	

=== Group G ===
Pos	Team	Pld	W	D	L	GF	GA	GD	Pts	Qualification
1	(São Paulo (state)) Ponte Preta	8	4	4	0	9	3	+6	12	Second phase
2	(Rio Grande do Sul) Internacional	8	4	2	2	17	6	+11	10	Second phase
3	(Paraná (state)) Grêmio Maringá	8	3	3	2	9	8	+1	9	Second phase
4	Goiás	8	2	3	3	9	13	−4	7	Repechage
5	(Federal District (Brazil)) Taguatinga	8	1	0	7	7	21	−14	2	

=== Group H ===
Pos	Team	Pld	W	D	L	GF	GA	GD	Pts	Qualification
1	(Goiás) Anapolina	8	5	2	1	15	8	+7	12	Second phase
2	(São Paulo (state)) XV de Jaú	8	3	2	3	10	10	0	8	Second phase
3	(Rio Grande do Sul) Internacional de Santa Maria	8	2	4	2	12	13	−1	8	Second phase
4	(Paraná (state)) Londrina	8	3	1	4	11	12	−1	7	Repechage
5	(Santa Catarina (state)) Joinville	8	2	1	5	11	16	−5	5	

== Repechage ==
Home team	Score	Away team
Londrina (Note: Londrina qualified due to having a better performance in the first phase)	0 – 0	Goiás
Náutico	6 – 2	CSA
Paysandu	3 – 1	América-RN
Cruzeiro	1 – 0	Desportiva

== Second phase ==
=== Group I ===
Pos	Team	Pld	W	D	L	GF	GA	GD	Pts	Qualification
1	(Rio de Janeiro (state)) Vasco da Gama	6	3	1	2	19	9	+10	7	Round of 16
2	(Mato Grosso do Sul) Operário-MS	6	3	1	2	5	8	−3	7	Round of 16
3	(Rio de Janeiro (state)) América-RJ	6	2	1	3	7	7	0	5	
4	(Rio Grande do Sul) Internacional de Santa Maria	6	2	1	3	4	11	−7	5	

=== Group J ===
Pos	Team	Pld	W	D	L	GF	GA	GD	Pts	Qualification
1	(São Paulo (state)) Guarani	6	4	1	1	13	8	+5	9	Round of 16
2	(Rio Grande do Sul) Grêmio	6	3	2	1	9	5	+4	8	Round of 16
3	(Pernambuco) Náutico	6	2	1	3	5	5	0	5	
4	(Paraná (state)) Grêmio Maringá	6	0	2	4	7	16	−9	2	

=== Group K ===
Pos	Team	Pld	W	D	L	GF	GA	GD	Pts	Qualification
1	(São Paulo (state)) Corinthians	6	4	1	1	9	5	+4	9	Round of 16
2	(Rio de Janeiro (state)) Flamengo	6	3	2	1	10	8	+2	8	Round of 16
3	(Minas Gerais) Atlético Mineiro	6	2	1	3	9	10	−1	5	
4	(Rio Grande do Sul) Internacional	6	0	2	4	5	10	−5	2	

=== Group L ===
Pos	Team	Pld	W	D	L	GF	GA	GD	Pts	Qualification
1	(Pernambuco) Sport	6	3	2	1	11	4	+7	8	Round of 16
2	Bahia	6	2	2	2	9	7	+2	6	Round of 16
3	(São Paulo (state)) XV de Jaú	6	1	4	1	7	10	−3	6	
4	(Pará) Paysandu	6	1	2	3	6	12	−6	4	

=== Group M ===
Pos	Team	Pld	W	D	L	GF	GA	GD	Pts	Qualification
1	(São Paulo (state)) Santos	6	4	1	1	9	3	+6	9	Round of 16
2	(Rio de Janeiro (state)) Bangu	6	3	1	2	7	4	+3	7	Round of 16
3	(São Paulo (state)) Internacional de Limeira	6	1	2	3	7	8	−1	4	
4	(Rio Grande do Sul) São Paulo-RS	6	1	2	3	4	12	−8	4	

=== Group N ===
Pos	Team	Pld	W	D	L	GF	GA	GD	Pts	Qualification
1	(São Paulo (state)) São José	6	3	3	0	8	2	+6	9	Round of 16
2	(Paraná (state)) Londrina	6	2	4	0	8	4	+4	8	Round of 16
3	(Rio de Janeiro (state)) Botafogo	6	1	2	3	5	8	−3	4	
4	(Paraíba) Treze	6	1	1	4	5	12	−7	3	

=== Group O ===
Pos	Team	Pld	W	D	L	GF	GA	GD	Pts	Qualification
1	(São Paulo (state)) São Paulo	6	5	0	1	14	7	+7	10	Round of 16
2	Ceará	6	3	0	3	11	11	0	6	Round of 16
3	(São Paulo (state)) Ponte Preta	6	2	2	2	6	6	0	6	
4	(Paraná (state)) Atlético-PR	6	0	2	4	2	9	−7	2	

=== Group P ===
Pos	Team	Pld	W	D	L	GF	GA	GD	Pts	Qualification
1	(Rio de Janeiro (state)) Fluminense	6	4	1	1	19	6	+13	9	Round of 16
2	(Goiás) Anapolina	6	4	0	2	9	9	0	8	Round of 16
3	(Minas Gerais) Cruzeiro	6	2	1	3	4	8	−4	5	
4	(Maranhão) Moto Club	6	1	0	5	2	11	−9	2	

== Round of 16 ==
Team 1	Agg.	Team 2	1st leg	2nd leg
Flamengo	3–2	Sport	2–0	1–2
Londrina	0–1	Santos	0–0	0–1
Anapolina	1–5	São Paulo	3–1	0–4
Operário-MS	1–2	Guarani	1–1	0–1
Bangu	5–3	São José	3–1	2–2
Bahia	3–6	Corinthians	1–1	2–5
Vasco da Gama	1–2	Grêmio	1–1	0–1
Ceará	1–4	Fluminense	1–2	0–2

== Quarter-finals ==
Team 1	Agg.	Team 2	1st leg	2nd leg
Flamengo	3–2	Santos	2–1	1–1
São Paulo	0–3	Guarani	0–1	0–2
Bangu	2–2	Corinthians (Note: Corinthians qualified due to having a batter performance in the Round of 16.)	0–1	2–1
Grêmio	3–2	Fluminense	1–1	2–1

== Semi-finals ==
Team 1	Agg.	Team 2	1st leg	2nd leg
Flamengo	5–3	Guarani	2–1	3–2
Corinthians	2–5	Grêmio	1–2	1–3

== Finals ==
=== First leg ===
18 April 1982

Flamengo (Rio de Janeiro (state))	1–1	(Rio Grande do Sul) Grêmio
Zico 89'		Tonho 83'

Maracanã, Rio de Janeiro (RJ)
Attendance: 138,107
Referee: (Rio de Janeiro (state)) José Roberto Wright

=== Second leg ===
21 April 1982

Grêmio (Rio Grande do Sul)	2–1	(Rio de Janeiro (state)) Flamengo
77' 83'		59'

Olímpico, Porto Alegre (RS)
Attendance: 74,238
Referee: (Rio de Janeiro (state)) José Roberto Wright

=== Replay ===
25 April 1982

Grêmio (Rio Grande do Sul)	0–1	(Rio de Janeiro (state)) Flamengo
		Nunes 10'

Olímpico, Porto Alegre (RS)
Attendance: 62,256
Referee: (São Paulo (state)) Oscar Scolfaro

== Final standings ==
Pos	Team	Pld	W	D	L	GF	GA	GD	Pts
1	Flamengo	23	15	6	2	48	27	+21	36
2	Grêmio	23	11	7	5	28	16	+12	29
3	Guarani	20	14	3	3	53	22	+31	31
4	Corinthians	12	6	2	4	19	15	+4	14
5	Fluminense	18	9	6	3	39	17	+22	24
6	São Paulo	18	11	1	6	43	23	+20	23
7	Santos	18	9	5	4	27	16	+11	23
8	Bangu	18	9	4	5	29	17	+12	22
9	Sport	16	10	3	3	28	12	+16	23
10	Vasco da Gama	16	10	2	4	42	14	+28	22
11	Anapolina	16	10	2	4	27	22	+5	22
12	São José-SP	16	7	6	3	17	11	+6	20
13	Operário-MS	16	7	4	5	17	19	−2	18
14	Bahia	16	5	7	4	21	19	+2	17
15	Londrina	16	5	6	5	19	17	+2	16
16	Ceará	16	7	2	7	24	30	−6	16
17	Ponte Preta	14	6	6	2	15	9	+6	18
18	Botafogo	14	6	3	5	21	17	+4	15
19	Atlético Mineiro	14	5	4	5	20	15	+5	14
20	XV de Jaú	14	4	6	4	17	20	−3	14
21	Internacional-SM	14	4	5	5	16	24	−8	13
22	Internacional	14	4	4	6	22	16	+6	12
23	Internacional-SP	14	3	6	5	20	18	+2	12
24	Cruzeiro	14	5	1	8	14	23	−9	11
25	Maringá	14	3	5	6	16	24	−8	11
26	Náutico	14	2	7	5	16	20	−4	11
27	Treze	14	3	3	8	11	29	−18	9
28	Moto Club	14	3	3	8	7	25	−18	9
29	Paysandu	14	1	7	6	10	23	−13	9
30	América-RJ	6	2	1	3	7	7	0	5
31	São Paulo-RS	6	1	2	3	4	12	−8	4
32	Atlético Paranaense	6	0	2	4	2	9	−7	2
33	Goiás	8	2	3	3	9	13	−4	7
34	Desportiva Capixaba	8	3	0	5	10	17	−7	6
35	CSA	8	1	4	3	9	13	−4	6
36	América-RN	8	2	0	6	8	16	−8	4
37	Vitória	8	3	0	5	7	12	−5	6
38	Joinville	8	2	1	5	11	16	−5	5
39	Mixto	8	2	0	6	10	17	−7	4
40	Nacional	8	0	4	4	5	13	−8	4
41	Itabaiana	8	1	1	6	2	18	−16	3
42	Taguatinga	8	1	0	7	7	21	−14	2
43	Ferroviário-CE	8	1	0	7	6	19	−13	2
44	River	8	0	0	8	6	26	−20	0

Source: rsssf.com

== See also ==
- 1982 Taça de Prata
