= 2004 Copa Libertadores finals =

- Event: 2004 Copa Toyota Libertadores
Boca Juniors	Once Caldas
(Argentina)	(Colombia)
1	1
- on aggregate Once Caldas won 2–0 on penalties

First leg
Boca Juniors	Once Caldas
0	0
- Date: 23 June 2004
- Venue: La Bombonera, Buenos Aires
- Referee: Gustavo Méndez

Second leg
Once Caldas	Boca Juniors
1	1
- Date: 1 July 2004
- Venue: Estadio Palogrande, Manizales
- Referee: Carlos Chandía

The 2004 Copa Libertadores final was a two-legged football match-up to determine the 2004 Copa Libertadores champion. It was contested by Colombian club Once Caldas and Argentine club Boca Juniors. The first leg of the tie was played on 23 June at Boca Juniors' venue, La Bombonera, with the second leg played on 1 July at Estadio Palogrande in Manizales.

After both matches ended tied, Once Caldas won the series by penalty shoot-out.

== Qualified teams ==
Team	Previous finals app.
(Argentina) Boca Juniors	1963, **1977**, **1978**, 1979, **2000**, **2001**, **2003**
(Colombia) Once Caldas	None

Bold indicates winning years

== Venues ==
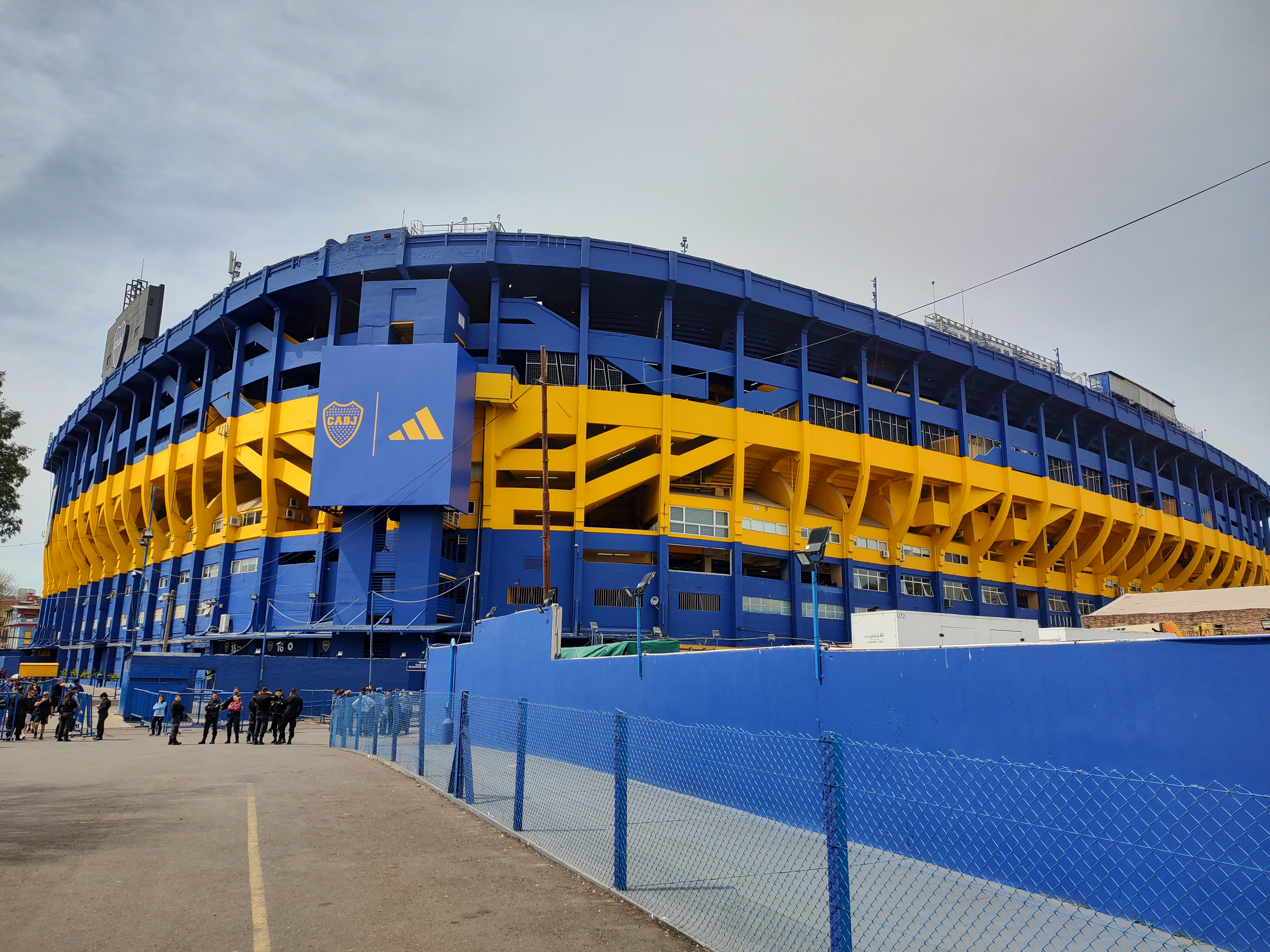
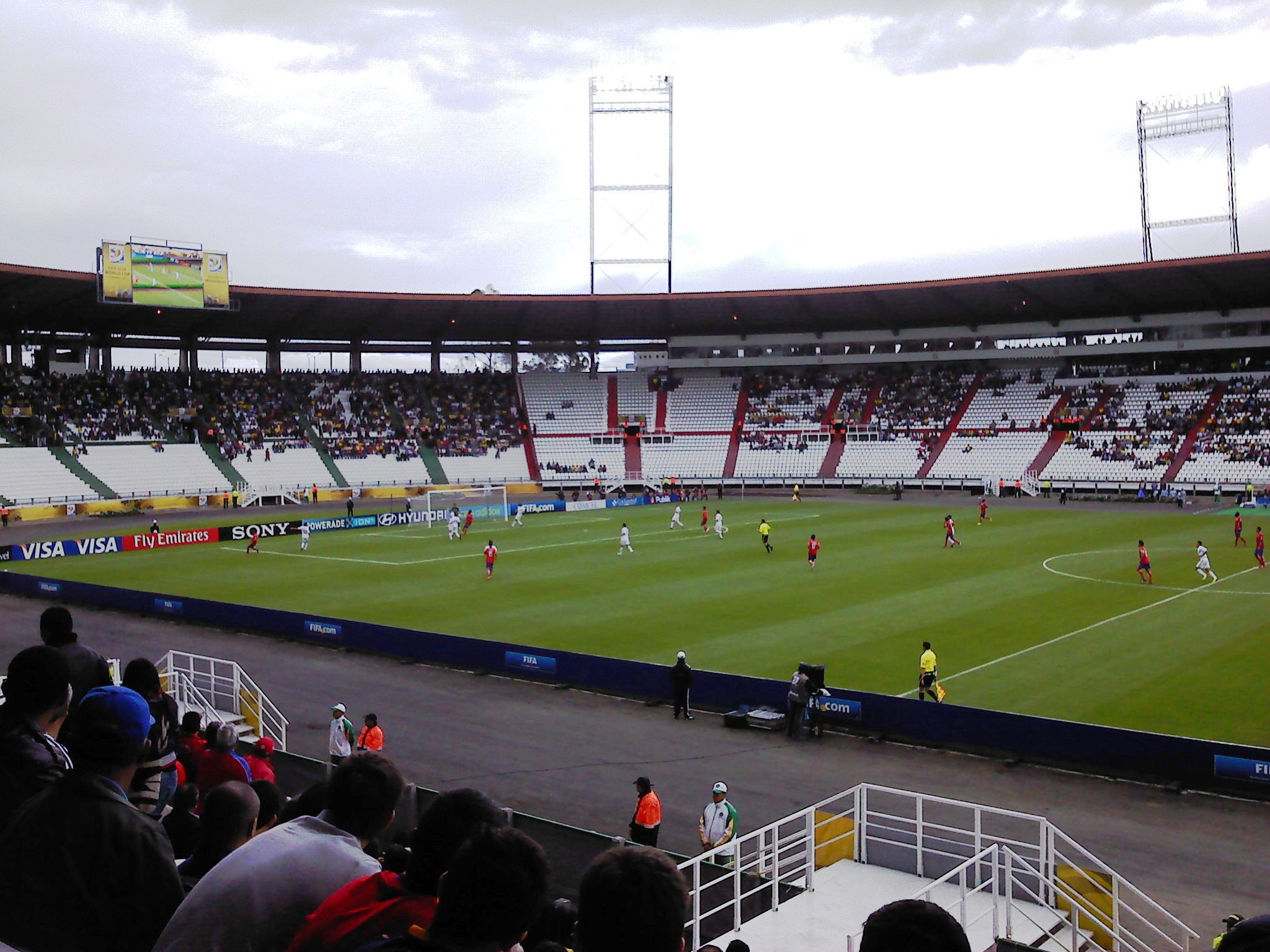
La Bombonera (Buenos Aires) and Estadio Palogrande (Manizales), venues for the finals

== Route to the finals ==
Once Caldas			Boca Juniors	
(Ecuador) Barcelona; A **0–0**		**Round of 16**; First leg	(Peru) Sporting Cristal; A **3–2**	Tevez 31'; Calvo 82'; Schelotto 90'
(Ecuador) Barcelona; H **1–1** (p. 4–2)	Agudelo 83'	Second leg	(Peru) Sporting Cristal; H **2–1**	Villarreal 40'; Tevez 62'
(Brazil) Santos; A **1–1**	Valentierra 88'	**Quarterfinals**; First leg	(Brazil) São Caetano; A **0–0**	
(Brazil) Santos; H **1–0**	Valentierra 70'	Second leg	(Brazil) São Caetano; H **1–1** (p. 4–3)	Barijho 65'
(Brazil) São Paulo; A **0–0**		**Semifinals**; First leg	(Argentina) River Plate; H **1–0**	Schiavi 28'
(Brazil) São Paulo; H **2–1**	Alcazar 27'; Agudelo 90'	Second leg	(Argentina) River Plate; A **1–2** (p. 5–4)	Tevez 89'

== Final summary ==
=== First leg ===
23 Jun 2004
21:15 (UTC-3)
First leg

Boca Juniors (Argentina)	0–0	(Colombia) Once Caldas
	Report

La Bombonera, Buenos Aires
Referee: Gustavo Méndez (Uruguay)

**Boca Juniors**	**Once Caldas**

GK	1	(Argentina) Roberto Abbondanzieri
DF	5	(Argentina) Pablo Alvarez
DF	2	(Argentina) Rolando Schiavi	(yellow card) 68'
DF	6	(Argentina) Nicolás Burdisso
DF	3	(Argentina) Clemente Rodríguez
MF	19	(Argentina) Pablo Ledesma
MF	20	(Argentina) Javier Villarreal	(yellow card) 72'
MF	8	(Argentina) Diego Cagna (c)		(substituted off) 76'
MF	10	(Brazil) Iarley
FW	7	(Argentina) Guillermo Barros Schelotto
FW	21	(Argentina) Antonio Barijho
Substitutes:
GK	12	(Argentina) Wilfredo Caballero
DF	4	(Argentina) Pablo Jerez
DF	13	(Argentina) Diego Crosa
DF	14	(Colombia) Luis Perea
FW	17	(Argentina) Franco Cangele		(substituted on) 76'
MF	23	(Argentina) Neri Cardozo
MF	24	(Argentina) Miguel Caneo
Manager:
(Argentina) Carlos Bianchi

GK	1	(Colombia) Juan Henao
DF	2	(Colombia) Miguel Rojas	(yellow card) 80'
DF	24	(Colombia) Samuel Vanegas (c)	(yellow card) 61'
DF	13	(Colombia) Édgar Cataño
DF	22	(Colombia) John García
MF	3	(Colombia) Jhon Viáfara
MF	5	(Colombia) Rubén Velásquez
MF	14	(Colombia) Diego Arango
MF	16	(Colombia) Elkin Soto		(substituted off) 74'
MF	8	(Colombia) Arnulfo Valentierra		(substituted off) 37'
FW	18	(Colombia) Jorge Agudelo		(substituted off) 64'
Substitutes:
GK	25	(Colombia) Juan C. González
DF	7	(Colombia) Jefrey Díaz
MF	10	(Argentina) Jonathan Fabbro
MF	15	(Colombia) Herly Alcázar	(yellow card) 81'	(substituted on) 64'
MF	20	(Colombia) Raúl Marín
FW	21	(Colombia) Javier Araujo		(substituted on) 37'
FW	23	(Colombia) Wilmer Ortegón		(substituted on) 74'
Manager:
(Colombia) Luis Montoya

Assistant referees:
(Uruguay) Pablo Fandiño
(Uruguay) Marcelo Costa
Fourth official:
(Uruguay) Martín Vázquez

=== Second leg ===
1 July 2004
19:15 (UTC-5)
Second leg

Once Caldas (Colombia)	1–1	(Argentina) Boca Juniors
Viáfara 7'	Report	Burdisso 52'
Penalties
Valentierra (penalty missed); Soto (penalty scored); Ortegón (penalty missed); Agudelo (penalty scored)	2–0	(penalty missed) Schiavi; (penalty missed) Cascini; (penalty missed) Burdisso; (penalty missed) Cángele

Estadio Palogrande, Manizales
Referee: Carlos Chandía (Chile)

**Once Caldas**	**Boca Juniors**

GK	1	(Colombia) Juan Henao
DF	2	(Colombia) Miguel Rojas
DF	24	(Colombia) Samuel Vanegas (c)
DF	13	(Colombia) Édgar Cataño
DF	22	(Colombia) John García	(yellow card) 51'	(substituted off) 90'
MF	3	(Colombia) Jhon Viáfara
MF	5	(Colombia) Rubén Velásquez
MF	15	(Colombia) Herly Alcázar		(substituted off) 78'
MF	16	(Colombia) Elkin Soto
MF	8	(Colombia) Arnulfo Valentierra
FW	17	(Colombia) Dayro Moreno	(yellow card) 25'	(substituted off) 67'
Substitutes:
GK	25	(Colombia) Juan González
DF	7	(Colombia) Jefrey Díaz		(substituted on) 67'
MF	14	(Colombia) Diego Arango
FW	18	(Colombia) Jorge Agudelo		(substituted on) 78'
MF	20	(Colombia) Raúl Marín
FW	21	(Colombia) Javier Araujo
FW	23	(Colombia) Wilmer Ortegón	(yellow card) 90'	(substituted on) 90'
Manager:
(Colombia) Luis Montoya

GK	1	(Argentina) Roberto Abbondanzieri
DF	14	(Colombia) Luis Perea
DF	2	(Argentina) Rolando Schiavi
DF	6	(Argentina) Nicolás Burdisso
DF	3	(Argentina) Clemente Rodríguez
MF	11	(Colombia) Fabián Vargas	(yellow card) 76'
MF	20	(Argentina) Javier Villarreal
MF	8	(Argentina) Diego Cagna (c)		(substituted off) 86'
MF	22	(Argentina) Alfredo Cascini
FW	17	(Argentina) Franco Cangele
FW	9	(Argentina) Carlos Tevez
Substitutes:
GK	12	(Argentina) Wilfredo Caballero
DF	5	(Argentina) Pablo Alvarez
MF	10	(Brazil) Iarley
DF	13	(Argentina) Diego Crosa
MF	19	(Argentina) Pablo Ledesma
FW	21	(Argentina) Antonio Barijho
MF	24	(Argentina) Miguel Caneo		(substituted on) 86'
Manager:
(Argentina) Carlos Bianchi

Assistant referees:
(Chile) Julio Cristian
(Chile) Rodrigo González
Fourth official:
(Chile) Pablo Pozo
