= 2004 Intercontinental Cup =

- Match programme cover
Porto	Once Caldas
(Portugal)	(Colombia)
0	0
- After extra time Porto won 8–7 on penalties
- Date: 12 December 2004
- Venue: International Stadium Yokohama, Yokohama
- Man of the Match: Maniche (Porto)
- Referee: Jorge Larrionda (Uruguay)
- Attendance: 45,748
- Weather: Cloudy; 7.8 °C (46.0 °F); 76% humidity

The 2004 Intercontinental Cup was an association football match that took place on 12 December 2004 between Porto of Portugal, winners of the 2003–04 UEFA Champions League, and Once Caldas of Colombia, winners of the 2004 Copa Libertadores. The match was played at the International Stadium in Yokohama, Japan in front of 45,748 fans and ended 0–0 after extra time, where Porto eventually won 8–7 in the penalty shoot-out. Maniche of Porto, despite being the only Porto player to miss his penalty kick, was named as man of the match.

This was the last Intercontinental Cup final as the competition was subsequently expanded from a single game between European and South American champions into the FIFA Club World Cup, also including North, Central American and Caribbean, Asian, African and Oceanian continental champions.

The match was the 43rd Intercontinental Cup, an annual football competition organized by the Union of European Football Associations (UEFA) and the South American Football Confederation (CONMEBOL).

== Match details ==
12 December 2004
19:10 JST

Porto (Portugal)	0–0 (a.e.t.)	(Colombia) Once Caldas
	Report
Penalties
Diego (penalty scored); Carlos Alberto (penalty scored); Quaresma (penalty scored); Maniche (penalty missed); McCarthy (penalty scored); Costinha (penalty scored); Jorge Costa (penalty scored); Ricardo Costa (penalty scored); Pedro Emanuel (penalty scored)	8–7	(penalty scored) Vanegas; (penalty scored) Alcázar; (penalty scored) Viáfara; (penalty scored) De Nigris; (penalty missed) Fabbro; (penalty scored) Velázquez; (penalty scored) Díaz; (penalty scored) Cataño; (penalty missed) García

International Stadium Yokohama, Yokohama
Attendance: 45,748
Referee: Jorge Larrionda (Uruguay)

Porto	Once Caldas

GK	99	(Portugal) Vítor Baía		(substituted off) 104'
RB	3	(Portugal) Pedro Emanuel
CB	2	(Portugal) Jorge Costa (c)	(yellow card) 79'
CB	6	(Portugal) Costinha
LB	5	(Portugal) Ricardo Costa
CM	22	(Greece) Giourkas Seitaridis	(yellow card) 85'
CM	18	(Portugal) Maniche
CM	11	(Brazil) Derlei		(substituted off) 70'
AM	16	(Brazil) Diego	(yellow card) 50' (yellow-red card) PSO
CF	9	(Brazil) Luís Fabiano		(substituted off) 78'
CF	77	(South Africa) Benni McCarthy
Substitutes:
GK	13	(Portugal) Nuno		(substituted on) 104'
DF	7	(Portugal) Pepe
DF	17	(Portugal) José Bosingwa
MF	12	(Portugal) César Peixoto
MF	19	(Brazil) Carlos Alberto		(substituted on) 70'
FW	10	(Portugal) Ricardo Quaresma		(substituted on) 78'
FW	41	(Portugal) Hélder Postiga
Manager:
(Spain) Víctor Fernández

GK	1	(Colombia) Juan Carlos Henao
RB	5	(Colombia) Rubén Velázquez
CB	6	(Colombia) Roller Cambindo		(substituted off) 46'
CB	24	(Colombia) Samuel Vanegas (c)
LB	14	(Colombia) Diego Arango	(yellow card) 33'	(substituted off) 61'
DM	3	(Colombia) Jhon Viáfara
RM	2	(Colombia) Miguel Rojas
CM	16	(Colombia) Elkin Soto		(substituted off) 98'
LM	22	(Colombia) Edwin García
CF	10	(Argentina) Jonathan Fabbro	(yellow card) 59'
CF	9	(Mexico) Antonio de Nigris	(yellow card) 117'
Substitutes:
GK	25	(Colombia) Juan Carlos González
DF	13	(Colombia) Édgar Cataño		(substituted on) 46'
MF	8	(Venezuela) Leopoldo Jiménez
MF	21	(Colombia) Javier Araújo
FW	7	(Colombia) Jeffrey Díaz		(substituted on) 61'
FW	15	(Colombia) Herly Alcázar		(substituted on) 98'
FW	17	(Colombia) Dayro Moreno
Manager:
(Colombia) Luis Fernando Montoya

Man of the Match:
Maniche (Porto)

Assistant referees:
Amelio Andino (Paraguay)
Winston Reategui (Peru)
Fourth official:
Toshimitsu Yoshida (Japan)

Match rules

- 90 minutes
- 30 minutes of extra time if necessary
- Penalty shoot-out if scores still level
- Seven named substitutes
- Maximum of three substitutes

== See also ==
- Intercontinental Cup
- UEFA Champions League
- Copa Libertadores
- FIFA Club World Cup
- FC Porto in international football competitions
