= Nissan Stadium (Yokohama) =

Multisport stadium in Yokohama, Japan

Coordinates: 35°30′36″N 139°36′23″E

International Stadium Yokohama Nissan Stadium

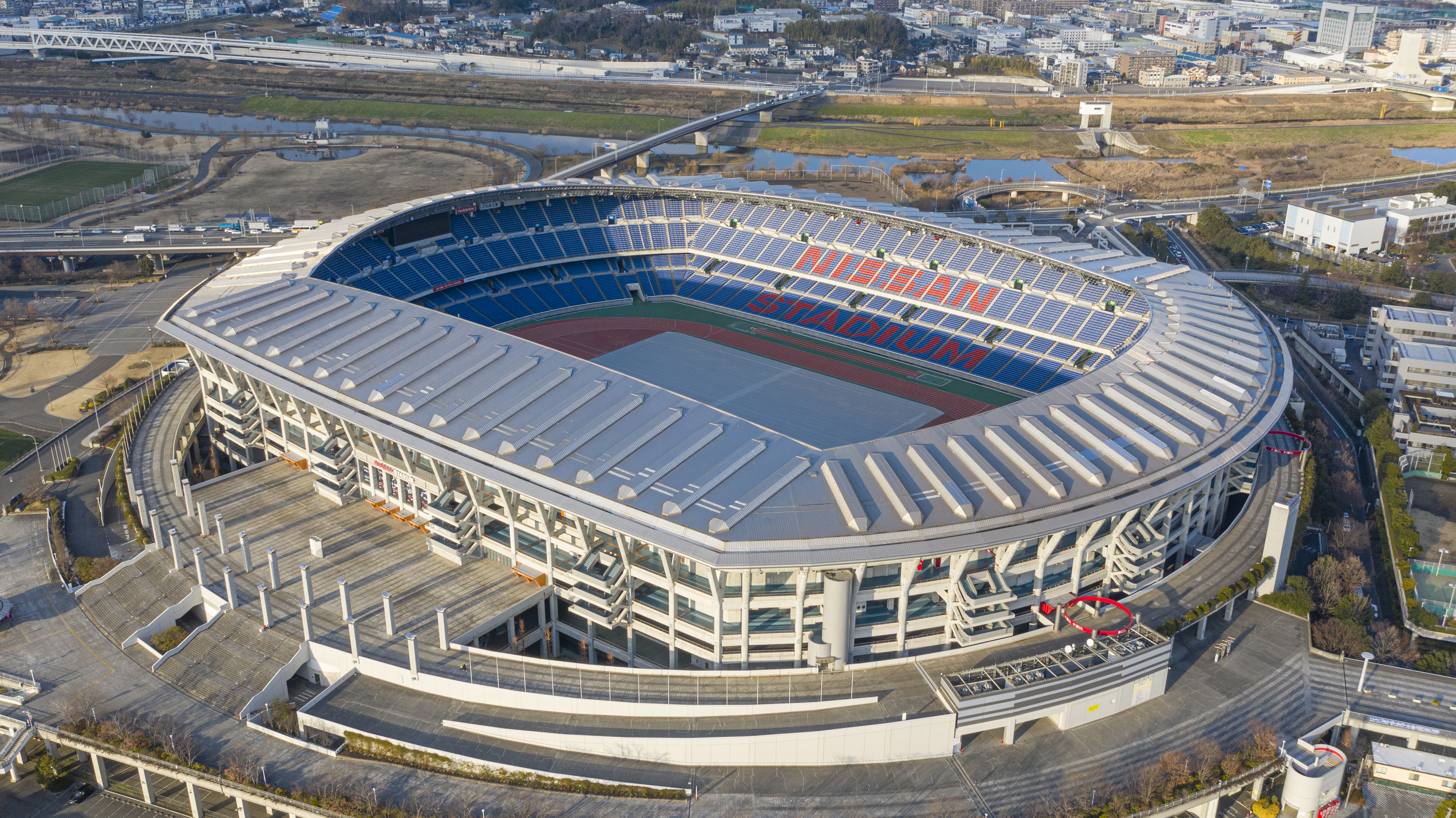
- The stadium in 2020
- Interactive map of International Stadium Yokohama; Nissan Stadium
- Location: Shin-Yokohama Park 3302-5 Kozukue-cho, Yokohama, Kanagawa Prefecture, Japan
- Owner: Yokohama City
- Operator: Yokohama Sports Association, Yokohama F. Marinos
- Capacity: 72,327; 71,624(J.League)
- Surface: Grass
- Field size: 107 m x 72 m
- Public transit: JR Central: Tokaido Shinkansen at Shin-Yokohama; JR East: Yokohama Line at Kozukue; Yokohama Municipal Subway: Blue Line at Shin-Yokohama; Tokyu Railways: Tokyu Shin-Yokohama Line at Shin-Yokohama; Sagami Railway: Sotetsu Shin-Yokohama Line at Shin-Yokohama

Construction
- Opened: 1 March 1998
- Cost: ¥60.3 billion

Tenants
- Yokohama F. Marinos (1999–present); Yokohama Eagles (2022–present); Japan national football team

The International Stadium Yokohama (横浜国際総合競技場, Yokohama Kokusai Sōgō Kyōgi-jō), currently known as Nissan Stadium (日産スタジアム, Nissan Sutajiamu) for sponsorship reasons, is a multi-purpose stadium in Yokohama, Kanagawa Prefecture, Japan, which opened in March 1998. It is the home stadium of Yokohama F. Marinos of the J1 League.

International Stadium Yokohama has the highest seating capacity of any stadium in Japan, with a total of 72,327 seats. It hosted three group stage games during the 2002 FIFA World Cup, and the final game between Germany and Brazil was played there on 30 June 2002. The stadium was one of the football venues for the 2020 Summer Olympics. The stadium was a venue for the 2019 Rugby World Cup and eventually hosted the final of the tournament after the originally selected host, National Stadium was unable to be constructed in time.

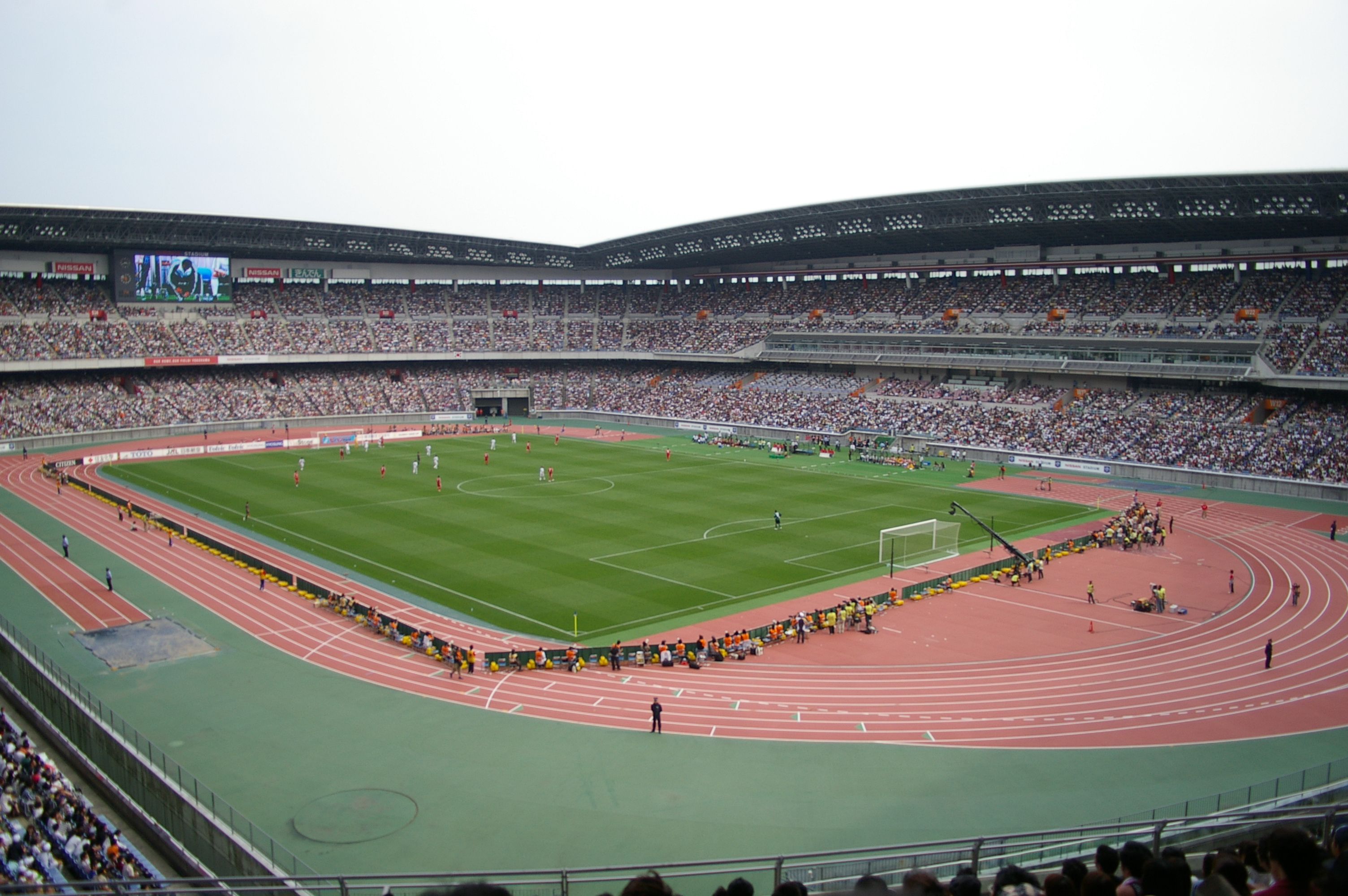
Inside the stadium

On 28 August 2009, Nissan Motors announced that they would not renew the contract for the naming rights of the stadium, which expired on 28 February 2010. But negotiations continued with the city, and a new agreement for three more years was completed. On 28 February 2013, Yokohama City as the stadium's owner renewed the contract for three years from 1 March 2013 until 29 February 2016 in a deal worth 150 million yen a year. On 1 December 2015, Yokohama City renewed the contract for five years from 1 March 2016 until 28 February 2021 in another deal worth 150 million yen a year. On 26 February 2021, Yokohama City renewed the contract for another 5 years from 1 March 2021 to 28 February 2026 in a deal worth 600 million yen (120 million yen per year).

== FIFA Club World Cup ==
International Stadium Yokohama has been hosting the FIFA Club World Cup since 2002, first as European/South American Intercontinental Cup and later the Club World Cup.

The first edition held in Yokohama was the match between Real Madrid and Olimpia, where Real were crowned champions. In 2005, the old Intercontinental Cup was replaced to the new World Championship involving football teams, the FIFA Club World Cup, with more teams and matches.

One of the venues, including the final, from 2005 to the 2008, from 2011 to the 2012 and from 2015 to the 2016 editions was the International Stadium Yokohama.

== Music events ==
Some Japanese musicians have played at this stadium. "Arena seats" are often set up on the track and ground. In 1999, Japanese best-selling rock band B'z first used the stadium as a music events. Then, B'z used the stadium three times in 2002, 2008 and 2013. Heavy metal band X Japan performed two consecutive nights on 14–15 August 2010. Their former bass player Taiji joined them both nights, the first, and only, time since he left the group in 1992. Attendance for both concerts was estimated at 140,000. The Japanese girl group AKB48 was the first ever female act to hold their concert at the stadium on 8 June 2013 followed by Momoiro Clover Z on 4 August 2013. They also held their fifth annual Senbatsu (AKB48 32nd Single's Selected Members) Election at the stadium in that evening after concert. South Korean group TVXQ performed at the stadium on 17 and 18 August 2013, as part of their Time: Live Tour 2013. Attendance for both concerts was estimated at 150,000. Tohoshinki announced three shows at Nissan Stadium (Total 5), as a grand finale of the tour Begin Again, thus becoming the only foreign artists to perform at the venue twice, as well TVXQ! The only one in the world to performance three consecutive days at Nissan Stadium on 8, 9 and 10 June 2018, Attendance for three concerts was estimated at 225,000. Nogizaka46 held their group 10th debut anniversary concert on May 14–15, 2022.

List of concerts
Date	Main act(s) + opening act(s)	Tour/concert name
28–29 August 1999	B'z	B'z Live-Gym '99 "Brotherhood"
15 September 1999	Eikichi Yazawa	50th Birthday Concert: Tonight The Night!
30–31 August 2002	B'z	B'z Live-Gym 2002 "Green: Go Fight Win"
23–24 August 2003	SMAP	MIJ Tour
30–31 August 2003	Southern All Stars	
23–24 July 2004	Aerosmith, The Who and more	Blue Wave The Rock Odyssey 2004
11–12 September 2004	Mr. Children	Mr. Children Tour 2004 Shifuku no Oto
23–24 July 2005	Yuzu	Yuzu Stadium 2005 "Go Home"
6–7 August 2005	SMAP	SMAP Sample Tour for 62 Days
12–13 August 2006	SMAP	Pop Up! SMAP Tour
8–9 September 2007	Mr. Children	Mr.Children "Home" Tour 2007: In The Field
16–17, 23–24 August 2008	Southern All Stars	30th Anniversary Live
15–16 August 2009	Glay	Glay 15th Anniversary Special Live 2009 The Great Vacation in Nissan Stadium
5–6 August, 11–12 September 2010	Exile	Exile Live Tour 2010 "Fantasy"
14–15 August 2010	X Japan	X Japan World Tour Live in Yokohama
3–4 September 2011	Mr. Children	Mr.Children Stadium Tour 2011 Sense: In The Field
12–13 May 2012	L'Arc-en-Ciel	20th L'Anniversary L'Arc-en-Ciel World Tour 2012
1 September 2012	Eikichi Yazawa	Eikichi Yazawa 40th Anniversary Live "Blue Sky"
8 June 2013	AKB48, SKE48, NMB48, HKT48	AKB48 Group Super Festival and 32nd Single Senbatsu Sosenkyo
4 August 2013	Momoiro Clover Z	Momoclo Natsu no Bakasawagi World Summer Dive 2013
17–18 August 2013	TVXQ	Live Tour 2013 "Time"
21–22 September 2013	B'z	B'z Live-Gym Pleasure 2013 Endless Summer: XXV Best
26–27 July 2014	Momoiro Clover Z	Momoclo Natsu no Baka Sawagi 2014 NISSAN Stadium Taikai ～Toujinsai～
18–19 July 2015	Sekai no Owari	Twilight City
8–9 August 2015	Masaharu Fukuyama	Mid Summer Foundation Festival
5–6 September 2015	Mr. Children	Mr.Children Stadium Tour 2015 "Mikan"
16-17 July 2016	Bump of Chicken	Bump of Chicken Stadium Tour 2016 "BFLY"
13–14 August 2016	Momoiro Clover Z	Toujinsai 2016 ～Oni ga Shima～
5–6 August 2017	Mr. Children	Mr.Children DOME & STADIUM TOUR 2017 Thanksgiving 25
8–10 June 2018	TVXQ	Live Tour "Begin Again" Special Edition
4–5 August 2018	B'z	B'z Live-Gym Pleasure 2018
14-15 May 2022	Nogizaka46	Nogizaka46 10th Year Birthday Live
11–12 June 2022	Mr. Children	Mr.Children 30th Anniversary Tour 半世紀へのエントランス
16–17 July 2022	Kanjani∞	18Sai
3–4 June 2023	King Gnu	King Gnu Stadium Live Tour 2023 Closing Ceremony
29–30 July 2023	Uverworld	UVERworld THE LIVE Nissan Stadium
2–3 September 2023	B'z	LIVE-GYM Pleasure 2023 -STARS-
25–26 May 2024	Seventeen	Follow
27–28 July 2024	Twice	5th World Tour "Ready to Be" in Japan Special
24–25 August 2024	Fujii Kaze	Fujii Kaze Stadium Live “Feelin' Good”
31 May–1 June 2025	Official Hige Dandism	OFFICIAL HIGE DANDISM LIVE at STADIUM 2025
7–8 June 2025	Snow Man	Snow Man 1st Stadium Live～Snow World～
30–31 August 2025	One Ok Rock	ONE OK ROCK DETOX JAPAN TOUR 2025
25–26 April 2026	TVXQ	
13–14 June 2026	back number	Grateful Yesterdays Tour 2026
4–5 July 2026	Ado	Ado STADIUM LIVE 2026 "Ao"
24–25 April 2027	Stray Kids	Run It World Tour

== Notable football matches ==
The stadium has hosted several international FIFA matches. Here is a list of the most important international and other matches held at the stadium.

2001 FIFA Confederations Cup

Semi-final
7 June 2001
17:00

Japan	1–0	Australia
Nakata 43'	Report

Attendance: 48,699
Referee: Benito Archundia (Mexico)

Final
10 June 2001
19:00

Japan	0–1	France
	Report	Vieira 30'

Attendance: 65,533
Referee: Ali Bujsaim (United Arab Emirates)

2002 FIFA World Cup

Group H
9 June 2002
20:30

Japan	1–0	Russia
Inamoto 51'	Report

Attendance: 66,108
Referee: Markus Merk (Germany)

Group E
11 June 2002
20:30

Saudi Arabia	0–3	Republic of Ireland
	Report	Keane 7'; Breen 61'; Duff 87'

Attendance: 65,320
Referee: Falla N'Doye (Senegal)

Group G
13 June 2002
20:30

Ecuador	1–0	Croatia
Méndez 48'	Report

Attendance: 65,862
Referee: William Mattus (Costa Rica)

Final
30 June 2002
20:00

Brazil	2–0	Germany
Ronaldo 67', 79'	Report

Attendance: 69,029
Referee: Pierluigi Collina (Italy)

Intercontinental Cup

2002
3 December 2002
19:20

Real Madrid (Spain)	2–0	(Paraguay) Olimpia
Ronaldo 14'; Guti 84'	Report

Attendance: 66,070
Referee: Carlos Simon (Brazil)

2003
14 December 2003
19:20

Boca Juniors (Argentina)	1–1 (a.e.t.)	(Italy) Milan
Donnet 29'	Report	Tomasson 23'
Penalties
Schiavi (penalty scored); Battaglia (penalty missed); Donnet (penalty scored); Cascini (penalty scored)	3–1	(penalty missed) Pirlo; (penalty scored) Rui Costa; (penalty missed) Seedorf; (penalty missed) Costacurta

Attendance: 66,757
Referee: Valentin Ivanov (Russia)

2004
12 December 2004
19:20

Porto (Portugal)	0–0 (a.e.t.)	(Colombia) Once Caldas
	Report
Penalties
Diego (penalty scored); Carlos Alberto (penalty scored); Quaresma (penalty scored); Maniche (penalty missed); McCarthy (penalty scored); Costinha (penalty scored); J. Costa (penalty scored); R. Costa (penalty scored); Pedro Emanuel (penalty scored)	8–7	(penalty scored) Vanegas; (penalty scored) Alcázar; (penalty scored) Viáfara; (penalty scored) De Nigris; (penalty missed) Fabbro; (penalty scored) Velásquez; (penalty scored) Díaz; (penalty scored) Cataño; (penalty missed) García

Attendance: 45,748
Referee: Jorge Larrionda (Uruguay)

2005 FIFA Club World Championship

Semi-final
15 December 2005
19:20

Saprissa (Costa Rica)	0–3	(England) Liverpool
	Report	Crouch 3', 58'; Gerrard 32'

Attendance: 43,902
Referee: Carlos Chandia (Chile)

Third place play-off
18 December 2005
16:20

Al Ittihad (Saudi Arabia)	2–3	(Costa Rica) Saprissa
Kallon 28'; Job 53' (pen.)	Report	Saborío 13', 85' (pen.); Gómez 89'

Attendance: 46,453
Referee: Mohamed Guezzaz (Morocco)

Final
18 December 2005
19:20

São Paulo (Brazil)	1–0	(England) Liverpool
Mineiro 27'	Report

Attendance: 66,821
Referee: Benito Archundia (Mexico)

2006 FIFA Club World Cup

Semi-final
14 December 2006
19:20

América (Mexico)	0–4	(Spain) Barcelona
	Report	Guðjohnsen 11'; Márquez 30'; Ronaldinho 65'; Deco 85'

Attendance: 62,316
Referee: Oscar Julian Ruiz (Colombia)

Third place play-off
17 December 2006
16:20

Al Ahly (Egypt)	2–1	(Mexico) América
Aboutreika 42', 79'	Report	Cabañas 59'

Attendance: 51,641
Referee: Jerome Damon (South Africa)

Final
17 December 2006
19:20

Internacional (Brazil)	1–0	(Spain) Barcelona
Adriano 82'	Report

Attendance: 67,128
Referee: Carlos Batres (Guatemala)

2007 FIFA Club World Cup

Semi-final
13 December 2007
19:30

Urawa Red Diamonds (Japan)	0–1	(Italy) Milan
	Report	Seedorf 68'

Attendance: 67,005
Referee: Jorge Larrionda (Uruguay)

Third place play-off
16 December 2007
16:00

Étoile du Sahel (Tunisia)	2–2	(Japan) Urawa Red Diamonds
Ben Frej 5' (pen.); Chermiti 75'	Report	Washington 35', 70'

Attendance: 53,363
Referee: Peter O'Leary (New Zealand)

Final
16 December 2007
19:30

Boca Juniors (Argentina)	2–4	(Italy) Milan
Palacio 22'; Ambrosini 85' (o.g.)	Report	Inzaghi 21', 71'; Nesta 50'; Kaká 61'

Attendance: 68,263
Referee: Marco Rodríguez (Mexico)

2008 FIFA Club World Cup

Semi-final
18 December 2008
19:30

Gamba Osaka (Japan)	3–5	(England) Manchester United
Yamazaki 74'; Endō 85' (pen.); Hashimoto 90+1'	Report	Vidić 28'; Ronaldo 45+1'; Rooney 75', 79'; Fletcher 78'

Attendance: 67,618
Referee: Benito Archundia (Mexico)

Fifth place play-off
18 December 2008
16:30

Al Ahly (Egypt)	0–1	(Australia) Adelaide United
	Report	Cristiano 7'

Attendance: 35,154
Referee: Peter O'Leary (New Zealand)

Third place play-off
21 December 2008
16:30

Pachuca (Mexico)	0–1	(Japan) Gamba Osaka
	Report	Yamazaki 29'

Attendance: 62,619
Referee: Pablo Pozo (Chile)

Final
21 December 2008
19:30

LDU Quito (Ecuador)	0–1	(England) Manchester United
	Report	Rooney 73'

Attendance: 68,682
Referee: Ravshan Irmatov (Uzbekistan)

2011 FIFA Club World Cup

Semi-final
15 December 2011
19:30

Al-Sadd (Qatar)	0–4	(Spain) Barcelona
	Report	Adriano 25', 43'; Keita 64'; Maxwell 81'

Attendance: 66,298
Referee: Joel Aguilar (El Salvador)

Third place play-off
18 December 2011
16:30

Kashiwa Reysol (Japan)	0–0	(Qatar) Al-Sadd
	Report
Penalties
Jorge Wagner (penalty scored); Sawa (penalty scored); Hayashi (penalty missed); Otani (penalty scored)	3–5	(penalty scored) Niang; (penalty scored) Keïta; (penalty scored) Majid; (penalty scored) Al Haidos; (penalty scored) Belhadj

Attendance: 60,527
Referee: Noumandiez Doué (Ivory Coast)

Final
18 December 2011
19:30

Santos (Brazil)	0–4	(Spain) Barcelona
	Report	Messi 17', 82'; Xavi 24'; Fàbregas 45'

Attendance: 68,166
Referee: Ravshan Irmatov (Uzbekistan)

2012 FIFA Club World Cup

Play-off for quarter-finals
6 December 2012
19:45

Sanfrecce Hiroshima (Japan)	1–0	(New Zealand) Auckland City
Aoyama 66'	Report

Attendance: 25,174
Referee: Djamel Haimoudi (Algeria)

A minute's silence was held before the match to commemorate Dutch linesman Richard Nieuwenhuizen, who had died following a violent incident at a youth competition four days before the match.

Semi-final
13 December 2012
19:30

Monterrey (Mexico)	1–3	(England) Chelsea
De Nigris 90+1'	Report	Mata 17'; Torres 46'; Chávez 48' (o.g.)

Attendance: 36,648
Referee: Carlos Vera (Ecuador)

Third place play-off
16 December 2012
16:30

Al Ahly (Egypt)	0–2	(Mexico) Monterrey
	Report	Corona 3'; Delgado 66'

Attendance: 56,301
Referee: Peter O'Leary (New Zealand)

Final
16 December 2012
19:30

Corinthians (Brazil)	1–0	(England) Chelsea
Guerrero 69'	Report

Attendance: 68,275
Referee: Cüneyt Çakır (Turkey)

2015 FIFA Club World Cup

Play-off for quarter-finals
12 December 2015
19:45

Sanfrecce Hiroshima (Japan)	2–0	(New Zealand) Auckland City
Minagawa 9'; Shiotani 70'	Report

Attendance: 19,421
Referee: Sidi Alioum (Cameroon)

Semi-final
17 December 2015
19:30

Barcelona (Spain)	3–0	(China) Guangzhou Evergrande
Suárez 39', 50', 67' (pen.)	Report

Attendance: 63,870
Referee: Joel Aguilar (El Salvador)

Third place play-off
20 December 2012
16:00

Sanfrecce Hiroshima (Japan)	2–1	(China) Guangzhou Evergrande
Douglas 70', 83'	Report	Paulinho 4'

Attendance: 47,968
Referee: Matt Conger (New Zealand)

Final
20 December 2015
19:30

River Plate (Argentina)	0–3	(Spain) Barcelona
	Report	Messi 36'; Suárez 49', 68'

Attendance: 66,853
Referee: Alireza Faghani (Iran)

2016 FIFA Club World Cup

Play-off for quarter-finals
8 December 2016
19:30

Kashima Antlers (Japan)	2–1	(New Zealand) Auckland City
Akasaki 67'; Kanazaki 88'	Report	Kim Dae-wook 50'

Attendance: 17,667
Referee: Janny Sikazwe (Zambia)

Semi-final
15 December 2016
19:30

América (Mexico)	0–2	(Spain) Real Madrid
	Report	Benzema 45+2'; Ronaldo 90+3'

Attendance: 50,117
Referee: Enrique Cáceres (Paraguay)

Third place play-off
18 December 2016
16:00

América (Mexico)	2–2	(Colombia) Atlético Nacional
Arroyo 38'; Peralta 66' (pen.)	Report	Samudio 6' (o.g.); Guerra 26'
Penalties
Martínez (penalty missed); Samudio (penalty missed); Quintero (penalty scored); Peralta (penalty scored); Arroyo (penalty scored)	3–4	(penalty scored) Mosquera; (penalty missed) Nieto; (penalty scored) Bocanegra; (penalty scored) Torres; (penalty scored) Borja

Attendance: 44,625
Referee: Nawaf Shukralla (Bahrain)

Final
18 December 2016
19:30

Real Madrid (Spain)	4–2 (a.e.t.)	(Japan) Kashima Antlers
Benzema 9'; Ronaldo 60' (pen.), 98', 104'	Report	Shibasaki 44', 52'

Attendance: 68,742
Referee: Janny Sikazwe (Zambia)

Kirin Cup/Kirin Challenge Cup

1998 Edition
24 May 1998

Japan	0–0	Czech Republic

Attendance: 66,930
Referee: Russamee Jindamai (Thailand)

1999 Edition
6 June 1999

Japan	0–0	Peru

Attendance: 67,354
Referee: Panya Hanlumyaung (Thailand)

2000 Edition
18 June 2000

Japan	2–0	Bolivia
Yanagisawa 7', 34'

Attendance: 65,073
Referee: Sun Baojie (China)

2004 Edition
13 July 2004

Japan	1–0	Serbia and Montenegro
Endo 48'

Attendance: 57,616
Referee: Eddie Lennie (Australia)

2008 Edition
22 May 2008

Ivory Coast	1–1	Paraguay
Traoré 74'		Bogado 78'

Attendance: 5,197
Referee: Kazuhiko Matsumura (Japan)

2011 Edition
7 June 2011
19:20 JST

Japan	0–0	Czech Republic
	Report

Attendance: 65,856
Referee: Martin Atkinson (England)

2017 Edition
10 October 2017
19:20 JST

Japan	3–3	Haiti
Kurata 7'; Sugimoto 17'; Kagawa 90+2'	Report	Lafrance 28'; Nazon 53', 78'

Attendance: 47,420
Referee: Peter Green (Australia)

2019 Edition
22 March 2019
19:20 JST

Japan	0–1	Colombia
	Report	Falcao 64' (pen.)

Attendance: 63,302
Referee: Peter Green (Australia)

2026 Edition
1 October 2026
15:00 JST

Panama	1–1	New Zealand
Herbert 45+1'	Report	Stamenić 13'
Penalties
Murillo (penalty scored); Harvey (penalty scored); Jiménez (penalty missed); Griffith (penalty scored)	3–5	(penalty scored) Bindon; (penalty scored) Stamenić; (penalty scored) Dyer; (penalty scored) Bayliss; (penalty scored) Boxall

Attendance: 8,513
Referee: Rubiel Vazquez (United States)

2026 Edition
1 October 2026
19:10 JST

Japan	0–0	Ecuador
Penalties
Ueda (penalty scored); Kamada (penalty scored); H. Itō (penalty scored); Sōma (penalty scored); Maeda (penalty scored)	5–4	(penalty scored) J. Caicedo; (penalty scored) Minda; (penalty missed) Castillo; (penalty scored) Sarmiento; (penalty scored) Valencia

Attendance: 65,012
Referee: Wiwat Jumpaoon (Thailand)

2019 J.League World Challenge

19 July 2019
19:00 JST

Kawasaki Frontale (Japan)	1–0	(England) Chelsea
Damião 86'	Report

Attendance: 62,012
Referee: Yuichi Nishimura (Japan)

2019 EuroJapan Cup

27 July 2019
19:30 JST

Yokohama F. Marinos (Japan)	1–3	(England) Manchester City
Endo 23'	Report	De Bruyne 18'; Sterling 40'; Nmecha 90+2'

Attendance: 65,052

== Football at the 2020 Summer Olympics ==
Men's tournament

Date	Time (JST)	Team #1	Res.	Team #2	Round	Attendance
22 July 2021	17:30	Ivory Coast	2–1	Saudi Arabia	Group D	0
22 July 2021	20:30	Brazil	4–2	Germany	Group D	0
25 July 2021	17:30	Brazil	0–0	Ivory Coast	Group D	0
25 July 2021	20:30	Saudi Arabia	2–3	Germany	Group D	0
28 July 2021	17:30	South Korea	6–0	Honduras	Group B	0
28 July 2021	20:30	France	0–4	Japan	Group A	0
31 July 2021	20:00	South Korea	3–6	Mexico	Quarter-final	0
7 August 2021	20:30	Brazil	2–1 (a.e.t.)	Spain	Final	0

Women's tournament

Date	Time (JST)	Team #1	Res.	Team #2	Round	Attendance
27 July 2021	20:30	Netherlands	8–2	China	Group F	0
30 July 2021	20:00	Netherlands	2–2 (a.e.t.) (2–4 pen.)	United States	Quarter-final	0
2 August 2021	20:00	Australia	0–1	Sweden	Semi-final	0
6 August 2021	21:00	Sweden	1–1 (a.e.t.) (2–3 pen.)	Canada	Final	0

== International rugby matches ==
4 November 2017
14:40 JST (UTC+9)

Japan	30–63	Australia
Try: Van der Walt 44' c Mafi 68' c Himeno 80' c Con: Matsuda (1/1) 44'; Tamura (2/2) 69', 80'; Pen: Matsuda (3/4) 17', 48', 53'	Report	Try: Kerevi (2) 5' c, 50' c Speight 11' c Polota-Nau 24' c Kuridrani (3) 32' c, 39' c, 56' c Phipps 61' c Simmons 64' c Con: Hodge (9/9) 6, 11, 24, 34, 40, 52, 57, 62, 65'

International Stadium Yokohama, Yokohama
Attendance: 43,621
Referee: Nick Briant (New Zealand)

Team details

FB	15	Kotaro Matsushima
RW	14	Lomano Lemeki	(substituted off) 60'
OC	13	Timothy Lafaele
IC	12	Harumichi Tatekawa	(substituted off) 52'
LW	11	Ryuji Noguchi
FH	10	Rikiya Matsuda
SH	9	Fumiaki Tanaka	(substituted off) 60'
N8	8	Amanaki Mafi
OF	7	Shunsuke Nunomaki	(substituted off) 63'
BF	6	Michael Leitch (c)
RL	5	Uwe Helu	(substituted off) 19'
LL	4	Kazuki Himeno
TP	3	Takuma Asahara	(substituted off) 52'
HK	2	Shota Horie	(substituted off) 63'
LP	1	Keita Inagaki	(substituted off) 72'
Replacements:
HK	16	Atsushi Sakate	(substituted on) 63'
PR	17	Koki Yamamoto	(substituted on) 72'
PR	18	Asaeli Ai Valu	(substituted on) 52'
LK	19	Wimpie van der Walt	(substituted on) 19'
N8	20	Fetuani Lautaimi	(substituted on) 63'
SH	21	Yutaka Nagare	(substituted on) 60'
FH	22	Yu Tamura	(substituted on) 60'
CE	23	Sione Teaupa	(substituted on) 52'
Coach:
(New Zealand) Jamie Joseph

FB	15	Kurtley Beale	(substituted off) 58'
RW	14	Henry Speight
OC	13	Tevita Kuridrani
IC	12	Samu Kerevi
LW	11	Marika Koroibete
FH	10	Reece Hodge
SH	9	Nick Phipps	(substituted off) 67'
N8	8	Sean McMahon	(substituted off) 62'
OF	7	Michael Hooper (c)	(substituted off) 62'
BF	6	Ned Hanigan
RL	5	Adam Coleman	(substituted off) 62'	(substituted on) 75'
LL	4	Rob Simmons		(substituted off) 75'
TP	3	Sekope Kepu	(substituted off) 58'
HK	2	Tatafu Polota-Nau	(substituted off) 52'
LP	1	Scott Sio	(substituted off) 58'
Replacements:
HK	16	Stephen Moore	(substituted on) 52'
PR	17	Tom Robertson	(substituted on) 58'
PR	18	Allan Alaalatoa	(substituted on) 58'
LK	19	Matt Philip	(substituted on) 62'
N8	20	Ben McCalman	(substituted on) 62'
N8	21	Lopeti Timani	(substituted on) 62'
FH	22	Joe Powell	(substituted on) 67'
WG	23	Curtis Rona	(substituted on) 58'
Coach:
(Australia) Michael Cheika

Touch judges:
Mike Fraser (New Zealand)
Tim Baker (Hong Kong)
Television match official:
Ben Skeen (New Zealand)

Notes:

- Asaeli Ai Valu, Kazuki Himeno, Fetuani Lautaimi, Sione Teaupa and Wimpie van der Walt (all Japan) and Matt Philip (Australia) made their international debuts.
- Ben McCalman (Australia) earned his 50th test cap.

27 October 2018
15:00 JST (UTC+9)

New Zealand	37–20	Australia
Try: Squire 11' c Read 35' c B. Barrett 58' c B. Smith 69' m Ioane 77' m Con: B. Barrett (3/4) 12', 36', 59'; Mo'unga (0/1); Pen: B. Barrett (2/2) 24', 52'		Try: Naivalu 38' c Folau 75' c Con: Foley (2/2) 40', 75'; Pen: Beale (1/1) 20'; Foley (1/1) 47'

Nissan Stadium, Yokohama, Japan
Attendance: 46,143
Referee: Romain Poite (France)

Team details

FB	15	Damian McKenzie	(substituted off) 67'
RW	14	Ben Smith
OC	13	Ryan Crotty	(substituted off) 60'
IC	12	Sonny Bill Williams
LW	11	Rieko Ioane
FH	10	Beauden Barrett
SH	9	TJ Perenara	(substituted off) 60'
N8	8	Kieran Read (c)
OF	7	Ardie Savea
BF	6	Liam Squire	(substituted off) 67'
RL	5	Scott Barrett
LL	4	Sam Whitelock	(substituted off) 51'
TP	3	Owen Franks	(substituted off) 51'
HK	2	Codie Taylor	(substituted off) 70'
LP	1	Joe Moody	(substituted off) 51'
Replacements:
HK	16	Nathan Harris	(substituted on) 70'
PR	17	Karl Tu'inukuafe	(substituted on) 51'
PR	18	Nepo Laulala	(substituted on) 51'
LK	19	Brodie Retallick	(substituted on) 51'
FL	20	Matt Todd	(substituted on) 67'
SH	21	Aaron Smith	(substituted on) 60'
FH	22	Richie Mo'unga	(substituted on) 67'
CE	23	Anton Lienert-Brown	(substituted on) 60'
Coach:
(New Zealand) Steve Hansen

FB	15	Dane Haylett-Petty		(substituted off) 71'
RW	14	Sefa Naivalu		(substituted off) 57'
OC	13	Israel Folau
IC	12	Kurtley Beale
LW	11	Marika Koroibete			(substituted off) 71'	(substituted on) 76'
FH	10	Bernard Foley
SH	9	Will Genia		(substituted off) 70'
N8	8	David Pocock
OF	7	Michael Hooper (c)
BF	6	Ned Hanigan		(substituted off) 51'
RL	5	Rob Simmons		(substituted off) 65'
LL	4	Izack Rodda
TP	3	Allan Alaalatoa		(substituted off) 53'
HK	2	Folau Fainga'a		(substituted off) 53'	(substituted on) 71'	(substituted off) 76'
LP	1	Scott Sio		(substituted off) 53'
Replacements:
HK	16	Tolu Latu	(yellow card) 66' to 76'	(substituted on) 53'
PR	17	Sekope Kepu		(substituted on) 53'
PR	18	Taniela Tupou		(substituted on) 53'
LK	19	Rory Arnold		(substituted on) 65'
FL	20	Jack Dempsey		(substituted on) 51'
SH	21	Nick Phipps		(substituted on) 70'
CE	22	Samu Kerevi		(substituted on) 57'
FB	23	Tom Banks		(substituted on) 71'
Coach:
(Australia) Michael Cheika

Man of the Match:
Rieko Ioane (New Zealand)

Touch judges:
Marius van der Westhuizen (South Africa)
Rasta Rasivhenge (South Africa)
Television match official:
Marius Jonker (South Africa)

Notes:

- Sonny Bill Williams (New Zealand) earned his 50th test cap.
- Sekope Kepu (Australia) became the ninth Australian to earn his 100th test cap and the first in his position for his country.

26 October 2024
14:50 JST (UTC+09)

Japan	19–64	New Zealand
Try: Naikabula 4' c Makisi 17' m Helu 68' c Con: Tatekawa (1/2) 5'; Matsunaga (1/1) 69'	Report	Try: Tele'a 11' c Tuipulotu 14' c Proctor 20' m Cane 23' m Finau 30' m Tosi 33' c Williams 39' c Roigard 43' c Love (2) 77' c, 80' c Con: McKenzie (7/10) 12', 15', 34', 40', 43', 78', 80'+1

Nissan Stadium, Yokohama
Attendance: 65,000
Referee: Jordan Way (Australia)

=== 2019 Rugby World Cup ===
Date	Time (JST)	Team #1	Res.	Team #2	Round	Attendance
21 September 2019	18:45	New Zealand	23–13	South Africa	Pool B	63,649
22 September 2019	16:45	Ireland	27–3	Scotland	Pool A	63,731
12 October 2019	17:15	England	0–0	France	Pool C	Match cancelled due to Typhoon Hagibis
13 October 2019	19:45	Japan	28–21	Scotland	Pool A	67,666
26 October 2019	17:00	England	19–7	New Zealand	2019 Rugby World Cup Semifinal 1	68,843
27 October 2019	18:00	Wales	16–19	South Africa	2019 Rugby World Cup Semifinal 2	67,750
2 November 2019	18:00	England	12–32	South Africa	2019 Rugby World Cup Final	70,103

== See also ==
- Lists of stadiums
- List of football stadiums in Japan
- List of stadiums in Japan

Events and tenants
Preceded by Estadio Azteca; Mexico City	FIFA Confederations Cup; Final venue 2001	Succeeded by Stade de France; Saint-Denis
Preceded by Stade de France; Saint-Denis	FIFA World Cup; Final venue 2002	Succeeded by Olympiastadion; Berlin
Preceded by National Stadium; Tokyo	Intercontinental Cup; Venue; 2002–2004	Succeeded by last stadium
Preceded by Estádio do Maracanã; Rio de Janeiro	FIFA Club World Cup; Final venue 2005–2008	Succeeded by Sheikh Zayed Stadium; Abu Dhabi
Preceded by Sheikh Zayed Stadium; Abu Dhabi	FIFA Club World Cup; Final venue 2011–2012	Succeeded by Stade de Marrakech; Marrakesh
Preceded by Stade de Marrakech; Marrakesh	FIFA Club World Cup; Final venue 2015–2016	Succeeded by Sheikh Zayed Stadium; Abu Dhabi
Preceded by Twickenham Stadium; London	Rugby World Cup; Final venue 2019	Succeeded by Stade de France; Saint-Denis
Preceded by Estádio do Maracanã; Rio de Janeiro	Summer Olympics; Men's football gold medal match 2020	Succeeded by Parc des Princes; Paris
Preceded by Estádio do Maracanã; Rio de Janeiro	Summer Olympics; Women's football gold medal match venue 2020	Succeeded by Parc des Princes; Paris
