= Dayro Moreno =

Colombian footballer (born 1985)

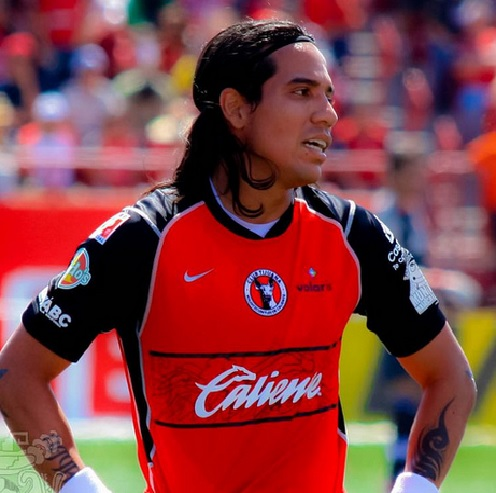
- Moreno with Tijuana in 2013

Personal information
- Full name: Dayro Mauricio Moreno Galindo
- Date of birth: 16 September 1985 (age 41)
- Place of birth: El Espinal, Tolima, Colombia
- Height: 1.78 m (5 ft 10 in)
- Position: Forward

Team information
- Current team: Once Caldas
- Number: 17

Youth career
- 2000–2003: Once Caldas

Senior career*
Years	Team	Apps	(Gls)
2003–2007	Once Caldas	136	(56)
2007	→ Atlético Paranaense (loan)	2	(1)
2008–2010	Steaua București	43	(12)
2009	Steaua II București	4	(2)
2010–2011	Once Caldas	49	(25)
2011–2018	Tijuana	95	(47)
2012	→ Once Caldas (loan)	12	(3)
2012–2013	→ Atlético Junior (loan)	38	(11)
2013–2014	→ Millonarios (loan)	45	(29)
2017–2018	→ Atlético Nacional (loan)	68	(44)
2018–2020	Talleres	29	(4)
2020	Once Caldas	14	(5)
2021–2022	Oriente Petrolero	17	(4)
2022	Atlético Bucaramanga	42	(22)
2023–	Once Caldas	129	(55)

International career^{‡}
2005	Colombia U-20	10	(0)
2007–2025	Colombia	32	(3)
Medal record
Colombia
Copa América
Bronze medal – third place	2016 United States
- * Club domestic league appearances and goals as of 12 December 2025 ‡ National team caps and goals as of 4 September 2025

Dayro Mauricio Moreno Galindo (born 16 September 1985) is a Colombian professional footballer who plays as a forward for Categoría Primera A club Once Caldas and the Colombia national team. He is the top goalscorer in the history of the Colombian Categoría Primera A with 225 goals.

Moreno began his career with Once Caldas, winning the 2004 Copa Libertadores. In 2008, he moved to Europe to play for Romanian club Steaua București for two years, before returning to Once Caldas in 2010 and winning the 2010 Finalizacion league title with the Manizales-based club. In 2011, he moved to Mexico's Club Tijuana, where he stayed until 2018 with loans in between to Atlético Junior, Millonarios, and Atlético Nacional. His time at Atletico Nacional was a success, winning the 2017 Recopa Sudamericana and 2017 Apertura while being the top goalscorer of both Apertura and Finalización tournaments in 2017. After being dismissed from the club due to disciplinary problems in October 2018, he transferred to Talleres de Córdoba of Argentina in December. In 2021, he had a brief spell at Oriente Petrolero in Bolivia, before returning to Colombia with Atlético Bucaramanga for the 2022 season, where he finished as top scorer again and led Bucaramanga into the playoffs for the first time in years.

Moreno has been capped internationally at the youth and senior level for Colombia. He was part of the squad that finished third at the Copa América Centenario.

Although known for his ability to score goals, Moreno has also been known negatively for indiscipline problems.

== Club career ==
=== Once Caldas ===
Moreno joined Once Caldas's youth academy aged 15, and made his professional debut in 2003. His first title as a professional was the 2003 Apertura title won against Junior, the club's first title in 53 years. The following year, Once Caldas won the 2004 Copa Libertadores, beating Boca Juniors in the finals, with Moreno participating for seventy minutes in the second leg. That same year, he was an unused substitute in the 2004 Intercontinental Cup, where Once Caldas lost the game in a penalty shoot-out against UEFA Champions League winners Porto. Moreno also participated in both legs of the 2005 Recopa Sudamericana, where Once Caldas lost 4–3 on aggregate to Boca Juniors.

In January 2007, Moreno was loaned out to Brazilian club Athletico Paranaense. However, he only played two games and scored once, which came on his debut against Figueirense in the first matchday of the Campeonato Brasileiro on 12 May 2007. He returned to Once Caldas in June 2007.

In the summer of 2007, Argentine club Boca Juniors showed their interest in him. However, nothing was finalized and he stayed with Once Caldas, where he was the top scorer of the 2007 Finalización with 16 goals.

After scoring the winning goal against Argentina in the 2010 FIFA World Cup qualifiers in November 2007, there were rumours that Moreno went clubbing, and arrived late to the next Once Caldas training session. As a result, head coach Santiago Escobar insisted on not playing him in the next match, but club president Jairo Quintero obligated Escobar to include Moreno in the lineup. Escobar was infuriated by the board's decision to support Moreno and he resigned shortly after the incident, although Moreno himself denies ever committing an act of indiscipline.

=== Steaua București ===
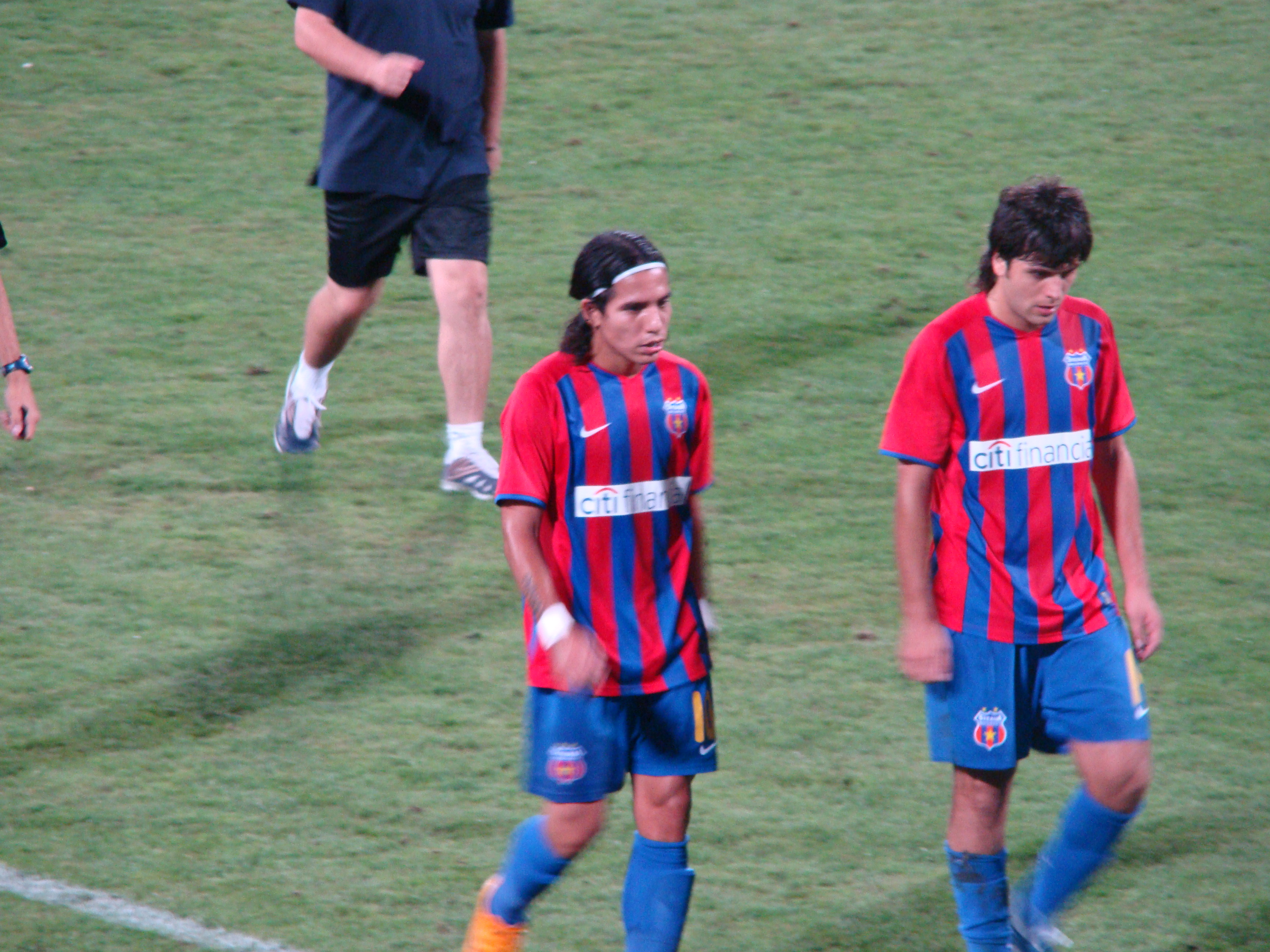
Moreno and compatriot Juan Toja with Steaua București in 2008

In January 2008, after an outstanding season with Once Caldas where he finished as top scorer in the 2007 Finalización, Romanian club Steaua București signed him for a club record US$2 million on a four-year contract. He joined fellow Colombians Róbinson Zapata, Pepe Moreno and Juan Toja, who were also playing for the club at the time.

He made his debut for the club in a 2–1 loss against Politehnica Iași on 24 February. His first goal in Romania came a week later in a 3–1 victory against CFR Cluj. On 26 April, he scored a game winner in a 2–1 away victory against Universitatea Craiova.

On 3 August, Moreno scored the opening goal of a 2–1 victory against FC Brașov. Ten days later, on 13 August, he scored his first UEFA Champions League goal in a 2–2 draw against Turkish club Galatasaray.

In June 2009, he had an argument in a training session with assistant manager Massimo Pedrazzini and was told to leave the session. He was initially fined €5,000 for indiscipline, but the fine was later increased to €15,000, and he was not included in the squad for the final match of the season against Unirea Urziceni. A few days later, at the end of the 2008–09 season, Moreno left Steaua to his native country without the club's consent, failed to show up for the team's preseason, and demanded a transfer.

Moreno eventually rejoined the club and was forgiven by Gigi Becali, but was demoted to the B squad for the beginning of the 2009–10 season for indiscipline. He agreed to play for the second team with an 85% salary reduction until he was prepared to come back to the first squad.

In October 2009, following a series of good performances for the B team, he was called back to the first team by new Steaua manager Mihai Stoichiță. He was in the starting eleven and scored in his first match since his return, a 2–0 away victory against Politehnica Iași on 17 October 2009.

Moreno left the club in January 2010, citing that he was not happy playing as a midfielder instead of his natural striker position, and that his family failed to adapt to the country. Overall his time at Steaua was filled with problems; he was fined on numerous occasions for indiscipline and had problems with manager Marius Lăcătuș, which eventually contributed to his exit.

=== Return to Once Caldas ===
Shortly after his exit from Steaua, it was reported on Click! that Moreno wanted to join another Romanian club, FC Timisoara. However, a week later, Moreno and Timisoara cancelled negotiations, and on 24 January 2010, he returned to Once Caldas on a transfer worth approximately €500,000. On 26 February, he scored the winner in a 2–1 home victory against São Paulo in the Copa Libertadores. In December, he scored in a 2–1 loss against Deportes Tolima in the first leg of the Finalizacion finals, but Once Caldas later won the title with a 3–1 victory in the second leg at Estadio Palogrande, with Moreno winning the golden boot in the process, scoring 16 goals.

=== Club Tijuana ===
In May 2011 he was linked with a transfer to Portugal's Sporting Lisbon, but the deal was canceled after he failed to agree on personal terms. On 2 June 2011, it was announced that Moreno would move to Liga MX team Club Tijuana for a fee of US$3.5 million. In January 2012, the Colombian forward requested to leave Tijuana after having a minor facial fracture while on vacation.

==== Loans to Caldas, Junior, and Millonarios ====
In February 2012, he rejoined Once Caldas on loan after rejecting an offer from Universidad de Chile.

Moreno then joined Junior on a year-long loan in late July 2012. On 2 September, he scored two goals in a 4–3 win against Patriotas Boyacá. On 7 April 2013, he scored two goals to help his team comeback from a 1–0 deficit against Cúcuta Deportivo and win the match 2–1.

On 6 July, Ascenso MX side Correcaminos announced that Moreno would join them for the upcoming season. However, the Colombian striker changed his mind and joined Millonarios two days later, after stating that he did not want to join a Second Division side. His first goal for the club came on 15 August in a 2–0 victory over his former club Junior as part of the Copa Colombia, where Moreno scored his penalty in the shootout, helping his club advance to the next round. Three days later, he scored a hat trick in a 3–0 win against Once Caldas. A week later, he added two goals against Deportivo Pasto, doing the same against Atlético Huila, which included a 90th-minute winner to bring his tally up to 8 goals in the last 5 matches. On 29 September, with Millonarios trailing 2–0, Moreno scored at the 85th minute and then added another goal deep into added time to salvage a draw. On 19 October, he scored the only goal in a victory against Deportivo Cali. On 7 December, he scored twice in a victory against Once Caldas in the final matchday of the playoffs. He finished top scorer of the 2013 Finalizacion, with 16 goals.

Moreno kicked off the 2014 Apertura with a brace in a 2–1 away victory at Estadio Polideportivo Sur against Envigado. On 9 February 2014, in the Superclasico against Atletico Nacional, he opened the scoring in a 3–1 home victory. He scored a hat-trick on 29 March in a 4–0 win over Patriotas. On 19 April, in a 3–1 win over Deportes Tolima, he added a brace. He finished as top scorer of the 2014 Apertura, with thirteen goals, and won the golden boot.

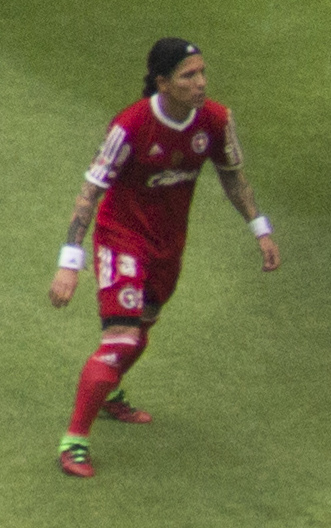
Moreno playing for Club Tijuana in a match against Club América in 2016

=== Return to Club Tijuana ===
On 10 July 2014, Club Tijuana announced that Moreno had rejoined the club. On 28 February 2015, he scored a last minute winner to give Tijuana a 3–2 victory against Pachuca, after having trailed by two goals at halftime. On 12 September, at Estadio Caliente, he scored twice against Chivas Guadalajara in a 2–1 victory, with his team having trailed 1–0 at halftime. On 12 February 2016, he scored a double in a 2–1 away victory against Tigres UANL at Estadio Universitario. Twelve days later, he scored a double in a 4–0 win against Atlas in the Copa MX.

On 16 July, Moreno scored a brace in a 2–0 win vs Atletico Morelia. Moreno was the top scorer of the 2016 Apertura alongside Raul Ruidiaz, with 11 goals.

=== Atlético Nacional ===
On 8 January 2017, Moreno signed with Atlético Nacional on a year-long loan with option to purchase. He made his debut on 9 February against Atlético Bucaramanga, and three days later, scored his first two goals for the club in a 3–0 victory against Rionegro Águilas. On 10 May, he scored two goals in the 2017 Recopa Sudamericana second leg against Chapecoense that contributed to his team's 4–1 victory. Moreno scored a brace, including an injury time winning goal, to contribute to his club's 3–2 victory after having trailed 0–2 against Jaguares de Córdoba on 4 June.

On 18 June, he scored a penalty in the second leg of the finals against Deportivo Cali, which ended in a 5–1 victory for Nacional. Nacional eventually won the title 5–3 on aggregate, having come from a 2–0 deficit in the first leg. On 17 September, Moreno scored a brace, including an injury time game winner, in a 3–2 win against Millonarios. A week later, he scored another brace in a 2–0 victory against Envigado.

On 14 October 2018, in the last minutes of a league match against Deportivo Cali, he had a fight with teammate Jeison Lucumí over taking a free-kick, and Lucumi was shown a red card. Two days later, Moreno was expelled from the team due to the previous incident and reiterated disciplinary behavior. On the other hand, Lucumi was handed a week suspension from team activities.

=== Talleres ===
On 18 December 2018, Moreno joined Argentine Primera División side Talleres on a two-year deal. He made his debut in a 1–1 draw against Independiente on 27 January 2019. On 20 February 2019, he scored his first goal for Talleres in a 2–1 loss to Palestino in the Copa Libertadores. On 20 April, in the Copa de la Superliga, he scored the opening goal of the match and then scored his penalty in the 3-2 penalty shootout victory against San Martín de San Juan. A week later, he scored a brace in a 3–2 victory against Atlético Tucumán. On 24 September, he scored the winning goal, a penalty, in a 2–1 victory against Gimnasia de La Plata. This was his first goal in five months.

According to the IFFHS, Moreno was the highest goalscoring Colombian player in top divisions in the 21st century (306), and the fourth-highest South American, only behind Fred (307), Luis Suárez (409), and Lionel Messi (518).

== International career ==
Moreno played seven games for the Colombia under-20 squad that won the 2005 South American U-20 Championship. He also made three appearances for the same team at the 2005 FIFA World Youth Championship. In total he made ten appearances for the U20 team and didn't score any goals.

Moreno made his Senior team debut on 1 March 2006 against Venezuela. He scored his first goal on 20 November 2007, the game-winner in a 2–1 victory against Argentina. On 6 June 2011, he was included in the 23-man squad chosen by coach Hernán Darío Gómez for the 2011 Copa América.

After a five-year-absence from the national team, he returned and opened the scoring in a 3–1 friendly win against Haiti on 29 May 2016. A few days later, he was included in José Pékerman's squad for the Copa América Centenario. Moreno played three games at the tournament and started the match against Costa Rica, but failed to score and didn't complete 90 minutes in any of the games he played.

On 29 August 2025, Moreno was called up for the national team after a 9-year absence.

== Career statistics ==
=== Club ===
Appearances and goals by club, season and competition
Club	Season	League			National cup (Note: Includes Cupa României, Copa MX, Copa Colombia, Copa Argentina)		Continental		Other		Total	
Club	Season	Division	Apps	Goals	Apps	Goals	Apps	Goals	Apps	Goals	Apps	Goals
Once Caldas	2003	Categoría Primera A	12	0	–		–		–		12	0
Once Caldas	2004	Categoría Primera A	43	8	–		6 (Note: Appearances in Copa Libertadores)	0	–		49	8
Once Caldas	2005	Categoría Primera A	27	14	–		4	0	2 (Note: Appearances in Recopa Sudamericana)	0	33	14
Once Caldas	2006	Categoría Primera A	32	20	–		–		–		32	20
Once Caldas	2007	Categoría Primera A	22	16	–		–		–		22	16
Once Caldas	Total		136	58	–		10	0	2	0	148	58
Atlético Paranaense	2007	Série A	2	1	–		–		–		2	1
Steaua Bucharest	2007–08	Liga I	11	5	0	0	0	0	–		11	5
Steaua Bucharest	2008–09	Liga I	27	5	0	0	8 (Note: Appearances in UEFA Champions League)	1	–		35	6
Steaua Bucharest	2009–10	Liga I	5	2	1	0	3 (Note: Appearances in UEFA Europa League)	0	–		9	2
Steaua Bucharest	Total		43	12	1	0	11	1	–		55	13
Steaua Bucharest II	2009–10	Liga II	4	2	2	2	–		–		6	4
Once Caldas	2010	Categoría Primera A	34	20	–		7	3	–		21	23
Once Caldas	2011	Categoría Primera A	15	5	–		10	2	–		25	7
Once Caldas	Total		49	25	–		17	5	–		66	30
Tijuana	2011–12	Liga MX	12	5	0	0	–		–		12	5
Tijuana	2014–15	Liga MX	30	10	3	0	–		–		33	10
Tijuana	2015–16	Liga MX	34	20	4	3	–		–		38	23
Tijuana	2016–17	Liga MX	19	12	0	0	–		–		19	12
Tijuana	Total		95	47	7	3	–		–		102	50
Once Caldas (loan)	2012-I	Categoria Primera A	12	3	6	1	–		–		18	4
Junior (loan)	2012-II	Categoría Primera A	16	6	1	1	–		–		17	7
Junior (loan)	2013-I	Categoría Primera A	18	5	1	1	0	0	0	0	19	6
Junior (loan)	Total		34	11	2	2	–		–		36	13
Millonarios (loan)	2013-II	Categoría Primera A	24	16	8	5	0	0	0	0	32	21
Millonarios (loan)	2014	Categoría Primera A	21	13	0	0	0	0	0	0	21	13
Millonarios (loan)	Total		45	29	8	5	0	0	0	0	53	34
Atletico Nacional (loan)	2017	Categoría Primera A	37	25	3	4	6	2	2	2	48	33
Atletico Nacional (loan)	2018	Categoría Primera A	31	19	5	2	5	3	2 (Note: Appearances in Superliga Colombiana)	0	43	24
Atletico Nacional (loan)	Total		68	44	8	6	11	5	4	2	91	57
Talleres	2018–19	Argentine Primera Division	9	1	7	4	4	2	–		20	7
Talleres	2019–20	Argentine Primera Division	20	3	1	0	0	0	–		21	3
Talleres	Total		29	4	8	4	4	2	–		41	10
Once Caldas	2020	Categoría Primera A	14	5	2	0	0	0	–		16	5
Oriente Petrolero	2021	Bolivian Primera División	17	4	0	0	0	0	–		17	4
Atlético Bucaramanga	2022	Categoría Primera A	42	22	1	0	0	0	–		43	22
Once Caldas	2023	Categoría Primera A	40	20	1	0	0	0	–		41	20
Once Caldas	2024	Categoría Primera A	49	21	1	0	0	0	–		50	21
Once Caldas	2025	Categoría Primera A	40	14	4	2	13 (Note: Appearances in Copa Sudamericana)	10	–		57	26
Once Caldas	2026	Categoría Primera A	26	12	0	0	0	0	–		26	12
Once Caldas	Total		155	67	7	2	13	10	–		175	79
Career total			739	332	49	23	68	23	6	2	852	380

=== International ===
As of match played 4 September 2025

Appearances and goals by national team and year
National team	Year	Apps	Goals
Colombia	2006	1	0
Colombia	2007	3	1
Colombia	2008	5	0
Colombia	2009	0	0
Colombia	2010	6	1
Colombia	2011	12	0
Colombia	2012	0	0
Colombia	2013	0	0
Colombia	2014	0	0
Colombia	2015	0	0
Colombia	2016	4	1
Colombia	2017	0	0
Colombia	2018	0	0
Colombia	2019	0	0
Colombia	2020	0	0
Colombia	2021	0	0
Colombia	2022	0	0
Colombia	2023	0	0
Colombia	2024	0	0
Colombia	2025	1	0
Total		33	3

As of match played 18 June 2016
Scores and results list Colombia goal tally first, score column indicates score after each Moreno goal.

List of international goals scored by Dayro Moreno
No.	Date	Venue	Cap	Opponent	Score	Result	Competition
1	20 November 2007	Estadio El Campín, Bogotá, Colombia	4	Argentina	2–1	2–1	2010 FIFA World Cup qualification
2	3 September 2010	Estadio José Antonio Anzoátegui, Puerto la Cruz, Venezuela	14	Venezuela	2–0	2–0	Friendly
3	29 May 2016	Marlins Park, Miami, United States	28	Haiti	1–0	3–1	Friendly

== Honours ==
Once Caldas

- Categoría Primera A: 2003 Apertura, 2010 Finalización
- Copa Libertadores: 2004

Atlético Nacional

- Categoría Primera A: 2017 Apertura
- Recopa Sudamericana: 2017

Colombia

- Copa América third place: 2016

Individual

- Categoría Primera A top goalscorer (7): 2007 Finalización, 2010 Finalización, 2013 Finalización, 2014 Apertura, 2017 Apertura, 2017 Finalización, Apertura 2022
- Liga MX Golden Boot (shared): Apertura 2016
- Liga MX Best XI: Apertura 2016
