= Miguel Rojas =

Miguel Rojas may refer to:

- Miguel Rojas (footballer) (born 1977), Colombian retired footballer
- Miguel Rojas (baseball) (born 1989), Venezuelan baseball player
