= Shin-Yokohama Park =

Public park in Japan

- 新横浜公園
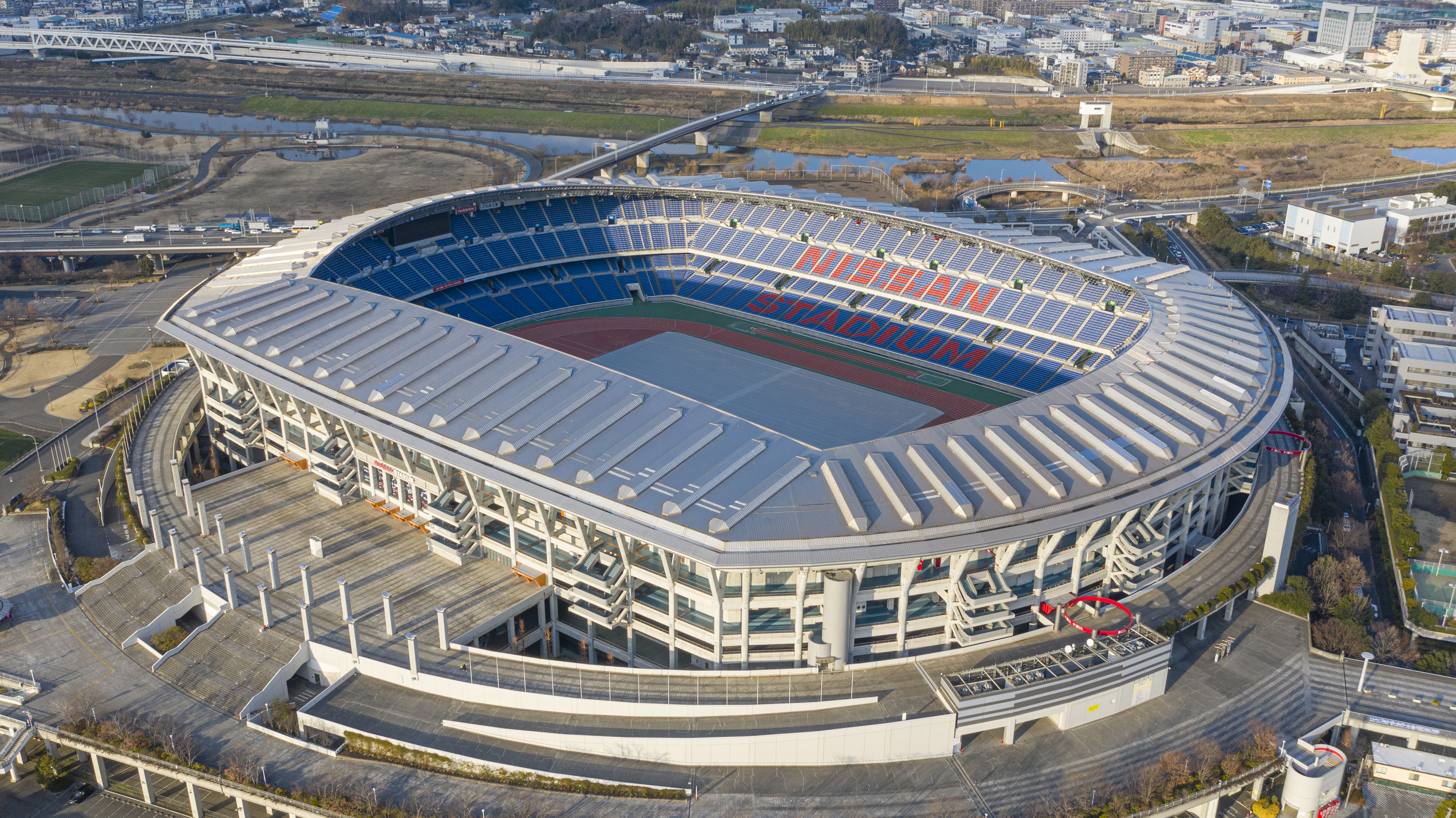
- Nissan Stadium in Shin-Yokohama Park
- Interactive map of Shin-Yokohama Park
- Location: Kōhoku Ward, Yokohama, Japan
- Coordinates: 35.513°N 139.605°E
- Open: March 1, 1998
- Website: Official site

Shin-Yokohama Park (新横浜公園, Shin-Yokohama Kōen) is a public park in Kōhoku Ward, Yokohama, Japan. It contains Nissan Stadium, a number of sporting fields and a birdwatching area. Nissan stadium is the largest stadium in Yokohama city and has a capacity of 72,000 spectators.

During a typhoon in October 2017, the park was partially flooded.
