= Juan Carlos Henao =

Colombian footballer (born 1971)

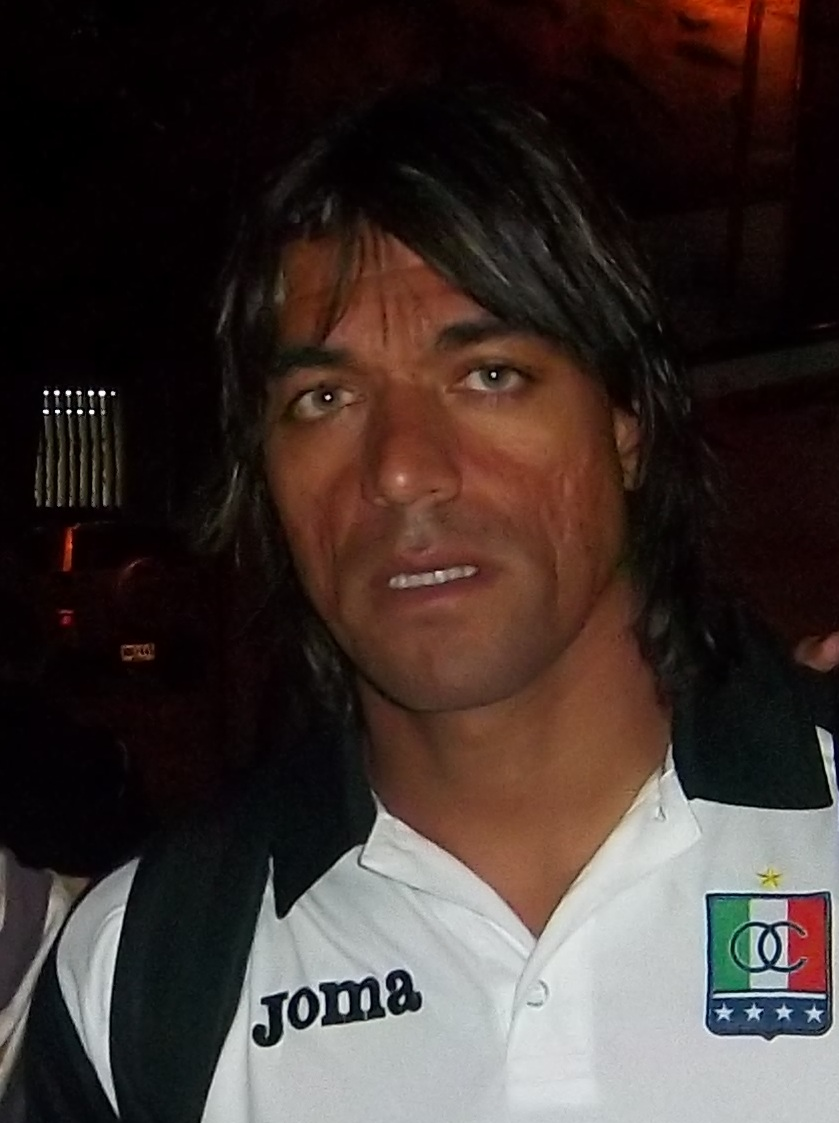
- Henao in 2012

Personal information
- Full name: Juan Carlos Henao Valencia
- Date of birth: 30 December 1971 (age 54)
- Place of birth: Medellín, Colombia
- Height: 1.81 m (5 ft 11 in)
- Position: Goalkeeper

Senior career*
Years	Team	Apps	(Gls)
1991	Dinastia Río Sucio	4	(0)
1992–2004	Once Caldas	259	(0)
2002	→ Bucaramanga (loan)	25	(1)
2005	Santos	4	(0)
2005–2007	Millonarios	39	(0)
2007–2008	Maracaibo	38	(0)
2009–2010	Real Cartagena	27	(0)
2010–2016	Once Caldas	70	(0)
Total		466	(1)

International career
2000–2005	Colombia	12	(0)
- * Club domestic league appearances and goals

Juan Carlos Henao Valencia (born 30 December 1971) is a Colombian former professional footballer who played as a goalkeeper. He was a key player in Once Caldas's victory in the 2004 Copa Libertadores.

== Career ==
As Once Caldas goalkeeper, in 2003, Henao won the Colombian Torneo Apertura, and in 2004, he won the Copa Libertadores and was runner-up of the Intercontinental Cup. He was capped nine times for the Colombia national team. In 2004, Henao finished in the fifth place in the Uruguayan El Pais' South American Player of the Year award, after collecting 32 votes, and in the eighth place in IFFHS's World's Best Goalkeeper, with 29 points, tied with Portuguese goalkeeper Vítor Baía. He signed a one-year contract with Santos on 3 January 2005.

Henao joined Real Cartagena on 3 February 2009. He returned to Once Caldas on 23 June 2010.

=== Transfer controversy ===
Henao joined Santos on free transfer on 3 January 2005, and his former club Once Caldas started a lengthy legal battle to claim the transfer fee. It was rejected by FIFA Dispute Resolution Chamber on 26 February 2010.

== Honours ==
Once Caldas

- Categoría Primera A: 2003-I, 2010-II
- Copa Libertadores: 2004

Individual

- 2004 South American Team of the Year
