= Elkin Soto =

Colombian footballer (born 1980)

Personal information
- Full name: Elkin Soto Jaramillo
- Date of birth: 4 August 1980 (age 46)
- Place of birth: Manizales, Colombia
- Height: 1.78 m (5 ft 10 in)
- Position: Midfielder

Team information
- Current team: Once Caldas (youth manager)

Youth career
- Atlético Nacional

Senior career*
Years	Team	Apps	(Gls)
1999–2004	Once Caldas	194	(25)
2005–2006	Barcelona SC	44	(7)
2007–2016	Mainz 05	191	(14)
2016–2017	Once Caldas	43	(2)
2019	Once Caldas	3	(0)

International career
2004–2013	Colombia	26	(6)

Managerial career
- 2022–: Once Caldas (youth)
- 2023: Once Caldas (caretaker)
- * Club domestic league appearances and goals

Elkin Soto Jaramillo (born 4 August 1980) is a Colombian football coach and former player who played as a midfielder. He is the current manager of Once Caldas' youth categories.

== Club career ==
Soto was born in Manizales, Caldas Department.

He was one of the fundamental parts in Once Caldas Copa Libertadores 2004 historic final against Boca Juniors in which they won.

Following one season with Ecuadorian side, Barcelona SC, Soto was signed by Jurgen Klopp to play for Bundesliga side, Mainz 05, where he spent 9 seasons (2007–2016), during which time he also played for Thomas Tuchel.

On 1 February 2019, it was confirmed that Soto had returned to Once Caldas for the third time. Soto retired at the end of the 2018–19 season.

== International career ==
He is also a starter of the Colombia national team where he plays left wing midfielder. He has been known for scoring many game-winning goals and is seen as a real leader on the field. He played the last five games of the qualifiers for the 2006 FIFA World Cup and scored against Peru, Ecuador and Uruguay. He has scored many goals in friendlies as well.

== Career statistics ==
=== Club ===
As of match played on 15 May 2017

Club performance		League		Cup		Continental		Other		Total	
Club	Season	Apps	Goals	Apps	Goals	Apps	Goals	Apps	Goals	Apps	Goals
Colombia		Categoría Primera A		Copa Colombia		Continental^{1}		Other^{2}		Total	
Once Caldas	1999	3	0	—		—		—		3	0
Once Caldas	2000	20	2	—		—		—		20	2
Once Caldas	2001	31	4	—		—		—		31	4
Once Caldas	2002	31	3	—		—		—		31	3
Once Caldas	2003	42	5	—		—		—		42	5
Once Caldas	2004	34	5	—		14	1	—		48	6
Once Caldas	2005	33	6	—		12	1	—		45	7
Once Caldas	Total	194	25	0	0	26	2	0	0	220	27
Ecuador		Serie A		Cup		Continental^{1}		Other		Total	
Barcelona	2006	44	7	—		—		—		44	7
Barcelona	Total	44	7	0	0	0	0	0	0	44	7
Germany		Bundesliga		DFB-Pokal		Continental^{3}		Other		Total	
Mainz 05	2006–07	8	0	0	0	0	0	0	0	8	0
Mainz 05	2007–08	7	1	0	0	0	0	0	0	7	1
Mainz 05	2008–09	23	2	0	0	0	0	0	0	23	2
Mainz 05	2009–10	30	1	1	0	0	0	0	0	31	1
Mainz 05	2010–11	26	4	2	0	0	0	0	0	28	4
Mainz 05	2011–12	31	1	3	0	2	0	0	0	36	1
Mainz 05	2012–13	28	1	3	0	0	0	0	0	31	1
Mainz 05	2013–14	20	1	1	0	0	0	0	0	21	1
Mainz 05	2014–15	16	3	0	0	1	0	0	0	17	3
Mainz 05	2015–16	1	0	0	0	0	0	0	0	1	0
Mainz 05	Total	190	14	10	0	3	0	0	0	203	14
Colombia		Categoría Primera A		Copa Colombia		Continental^{1}		Other^{2}		Total	
Once Caldas	2016	15	0	0	0	0	0	0	0	15	0
Once Caldas	2017	14	1	1	0	0	0	0	0	15	1
Once Caldas	Total	29	0	1	0	0	0	0	0	30	1
Career total		457	47	11	0	29	2	0	0	496	49

^{1} Includes cup competitions such as Copa Libertadores and Copa Sudamericana.

^{2} Includes Superliga Colombiana matches.

^{3} Includes UEFA Champions League and UEFA Europa League matches.

=== International goals ===
Scores and results lists Colombia's goal tally first.

#	Date	Venue	Opponent	Score	Result	Competition
1.	4 June 2005	Estadio Metropolitano Roberto Meléndez, Barranquilla, Colombia	Peru	2–0	5–0	2006 FIFA World Cup qualification
2.	4 September 2005	Estadio Centenario, Montevideo, Uruguay	Uruguay	1–2	2–3	2006 FIFA World Cup qualification
3.	1 March 2006	Estadio José Pachencho Romero, Maracaibo, Venezuela	Venezuela	1–1	1–1	Friendly
4.	25 May 2006	Giants Stadium, East Rutherford, United States	Ecuador	1–1	1–1	Friendly
5.	4 June 2006	Camp Municipal Narcís Sala, Barcelona, Spain	Morocco	1–0	2–0	Friendly
6.	16 August 2006	Estadio Nacional Julio Martínez Prádanos, Santiago, Chile	Chile	2–1	2–1	Friendly

== Honours ==
=== Club ===
Once Caldas

- Categoría Primera A: 2003-I
- Copa Libertadores: 2004
