= Edwin García =

Colombian footballer (born 1982)

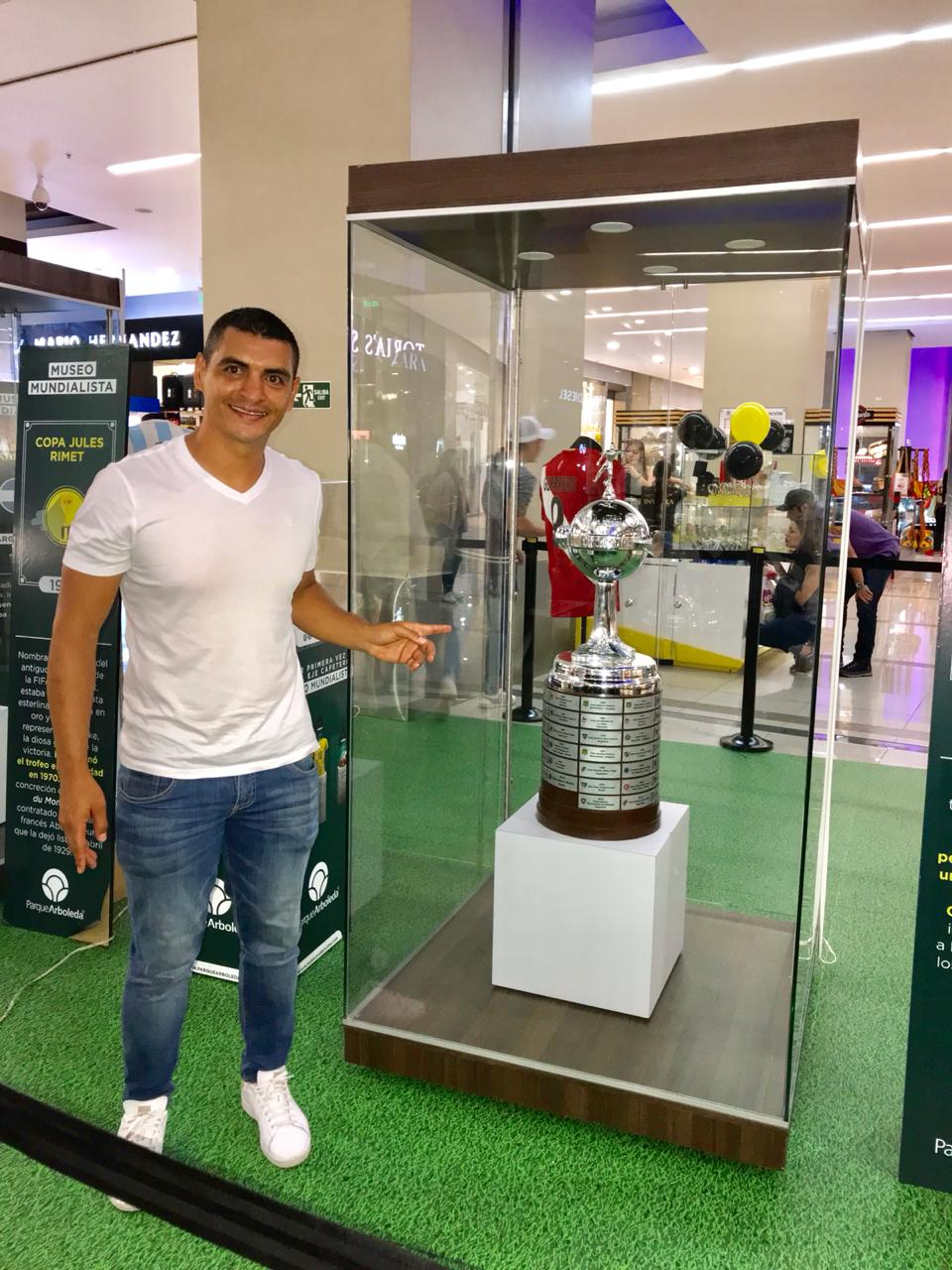

Personal information
- Full name: Jhon Edwin García Jiménez
- Date of birth: 10 July 1982 (age 44)
- Place of birth: Pereira, Colombia
- Height: 1.70 m (5 ft 7 in)
- Position: Defender

Senior career*
| Years | Team | Apps | (Gls) |
| 2003–2004 | Once Caldas | 26 | (0) |
| 2005 | Millonarios FC | 18 | (0) |
| 2005–2006 | Once Caldas | 23 | (0) |
| 2007 | La Equidad | 9 | (0) |
| 2010 | Deportivo Pasto | 4 | (0) |
| 2011 | Itagüí | 12 | (0) |
| 2012–2013 | Deportivo Pereira | 29 | (0) |
- * Club domestic league appearances and goals

Edwin García (born July 10, 1982) is a retired Colombian football defender.

== Titles ==
| Season | Club | Title |
|---|---|---|
| 2004 | Once Caldas | Copa Libertadores |
