= Javier Araújo =

Colombian footballer (born 1984)

Personal information
- Full name: Javier Araújo Peñaloza
- Date of birth: December 26, 1984 (age 41)
- Place of birth: Codazzi, Cesar, Colombia
- Height: 1.75 m (5 ft 9 in)
- Position: Midfielder

Team information
- Current team: Valledupar

Senior career*
Years	Team	Apps	(Gls)
2001–2005	Once Caldas	47	(5)
2005	Deportivo Pasto	21	(5)
2006–2007	Once Caldas	52	(4)
2007	Chicó	21	(2)
2008	Once Caldas	13	(0)
2008–2009	Millonarios	9	(0)
2010	Atlético Huila	25	(2)
2011	La Equidad	37	(7)
2012	Juan Aurich	8	(0)
2013	Cúcuta Deportivo	6	(0)
2014	Uniautónoma	6	(0)
2015–2017	Valledupar	9	(0)

International career
2007–2009	Colombia	4	(0)
- * Club domestic league appearances and goals as of 30 December 2016

Javier Araújo (born December 26, 1984) is a former Colombian football player who played as a midfielder. He last played for Valledupar.

== Career ==
Araújo began his career in Colombia in 2002 with Once Caldas. In 2004, he was part of the squad that won the Copa Libertadores 2004.

In 2007, Araújo was also selected to play for the Colombia national football team for the first time.

== Titles ==
Once Caldas

- Categoria Primera A: Apertura 2003
- Copa Libertadores: 2004
