= Herly Alcázar =

Colombian footballer (born 1976)

Herly Alcazar
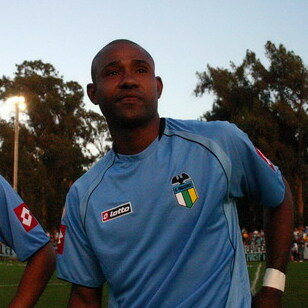
- Alcázar with O'Higgins in 2007

Personal information
- Full name: Herly Enrique Alcázar Vélez
- Date of birth: 30 September 1976 (age 50)
- Place of birth: Cartagena, Bolivar, Colombia
- Height: 1.76 m (5 ft 9 1/2 in)
- Position: Striker

Senior career*
Years	Team	Apps	(Gls)
1995–1997	Millonarios	8	(0)
1998–1999	Deportivo Pasto	31	(14)
1999	Atlético Bucaramanga	20	(6)
2000	Cienciano	18	(11)
2000–2001	Junior	41	(5)
2001	Sporting Cristal	18	(3)
2002	Santa Fe	27	(5)
2002	Deportes Tolima	26	(8)
2003	Centauros Villavicencio	28	(11)
2004–2005	Once Caldas	28	(13)
2005	Universidad San Martín	8	(2)
2006	Universidad de Chile	16	(11)
2006	Chiapas	15	(1)
2007	O'Higgins	19	(4)
2007–2008	Junior	22	(7)
2008–2009	Atlético Huila	31	(7)
2009–2010	La Equidad	27	(6)
2010	América de Cali	2	(0)
2011	Millonarios	0	(0)
2011	Bogotá FC	12	(6)
2012	Uniautónoma	7	(0)
Total		404	(120)

International career
2003	Colombia	1	(0)
- * Club domestic league appearances and goals

Herly Enrique Alcázar Vélez (born 30 October 1976) is a former Colombian professional footballer who played as a striker.

During a career spanning almost two decades, he represented numerous clubs in Colombia and also played professionally in Peru, Chile and Mexico. He was capped by the Colombia national football team in 2003.

== Club career ==
Alcázar began his professional career with Once Caldas in 1995. He later represented Atlético Bucaramanga, Deportes Tolima and Independiente Medellín, among other Colombian clubs, before moving abroad to play for Peruvian side Cienciano in 2000.

After returning to Colombia, Alcázar joined Centauros Villavicencio and became one of the team's leading players during its successful 2002 campaign. He helped Centauros win promotion to the Categoría Primera A, scoring in the decisive promotion quadrangular against Alianza Petrolera.

Alcázar remained with Centauros following promotion and emerged as one of the leading goalscorers in the Colombian top flight during 2003. His performances earned him a call-up to the Colombia national football team and attracted interest from several clubs.

In 2004, he joined Once Caldas, shortly after the Manizales club had won the 2004 Copa Libertadores. Alcázar was included in the squad that travelled to Japan to face FC Porto in the 2004 Intercontinental Cup. He su0bsequently joined Junior, where he continued his career in the Colombian Primera A.

In 2005, Alcázar moved to Chile and signed for Universidad de Chile. He arrived as one of the club's attacking reinforcements for the Clausura tournament. Alcázar scored his first goal for Universidad de Chile in a 2–0 victory over Deportes Puerto Montt, converting a penalty in the second half.

Universidad de Chile reached the final of the 2005 Clausura against Universidad Católica. Alcázar appeared during the campaign but was increasingly used as a substitute as the tournament progressed. He left the club at the end of the season after scoring three league goals.

In 2006, Alcázar returned to Colombia and joined Once Caldas before moving to Jaguares de Chiapas in Mexico. He subsequently returned to Colombia with Junior. In the 2007 Copa Libertadores, he scored twice for the Barranquilla club in a 3–1 victory over Venezuelan side Unión Atlético Maracaibo.

Alcázar later played for La Equidad, Atlético Huila and América de Cali, among other Colombian clubs. With La Equidad, he reached the final of the 2007 Finalización, where the Bogotá club finished runner-up to Atlético Nacional.

During the later stages of his career, Alcázar also represented Real Cartagena and other Colombian clubs.

== International career ==
Alcázar received his first call-up to the Colombia national football team in 2003 following his performances with Centauros Villavicencio. He earned three senior international caps that year.

== Honors ==
Once Caldas

- Copa Libertadores (1): 2004
