= Roller Cambindo =

Colombian footballer (born 1978)

Personal information
- Full name: Roller Cambindo Ibarra
- Date of birth: 29 October 1978 (age 48)
- Place of birth: Buenaventura, Colombia
- Position: Centre-back

Senior career*
| Years | Team | Apps | (Gls) |
| 1996–1999 | Millonarios | | |
| 1999–2002 | Deportes Tolima | | |
| 2003–2004 | Millonarios | | |
| 2004 | Once Caldas | | |
| 2005 | Ferro Carril Oeste | | |
| 2005–2006 | San Martín de Porres | | |
| 2007 | Deportes Tolima | | |
| 2008–2010 | Atlético Junior | | |
| 2011–2012 | León de Huánuco | | |
| 2013 | Los Caimanes | | |
| 2014 | Defensor San Alejandro | | |
- * Club domestic league appearances and goals

Roller Cambindo Ibarra (born 29 October 1978) is a Colombian former footballer who last played for Defensor San Alejandro of the Peruvian Segunda División. He played as a centre back.

== Titles ==
- Atlético Junior 2010 (Torneo Apertura Colombian Primera División Championship)
