= Jhon Viáfara =

Colombian footballer (born 1978)

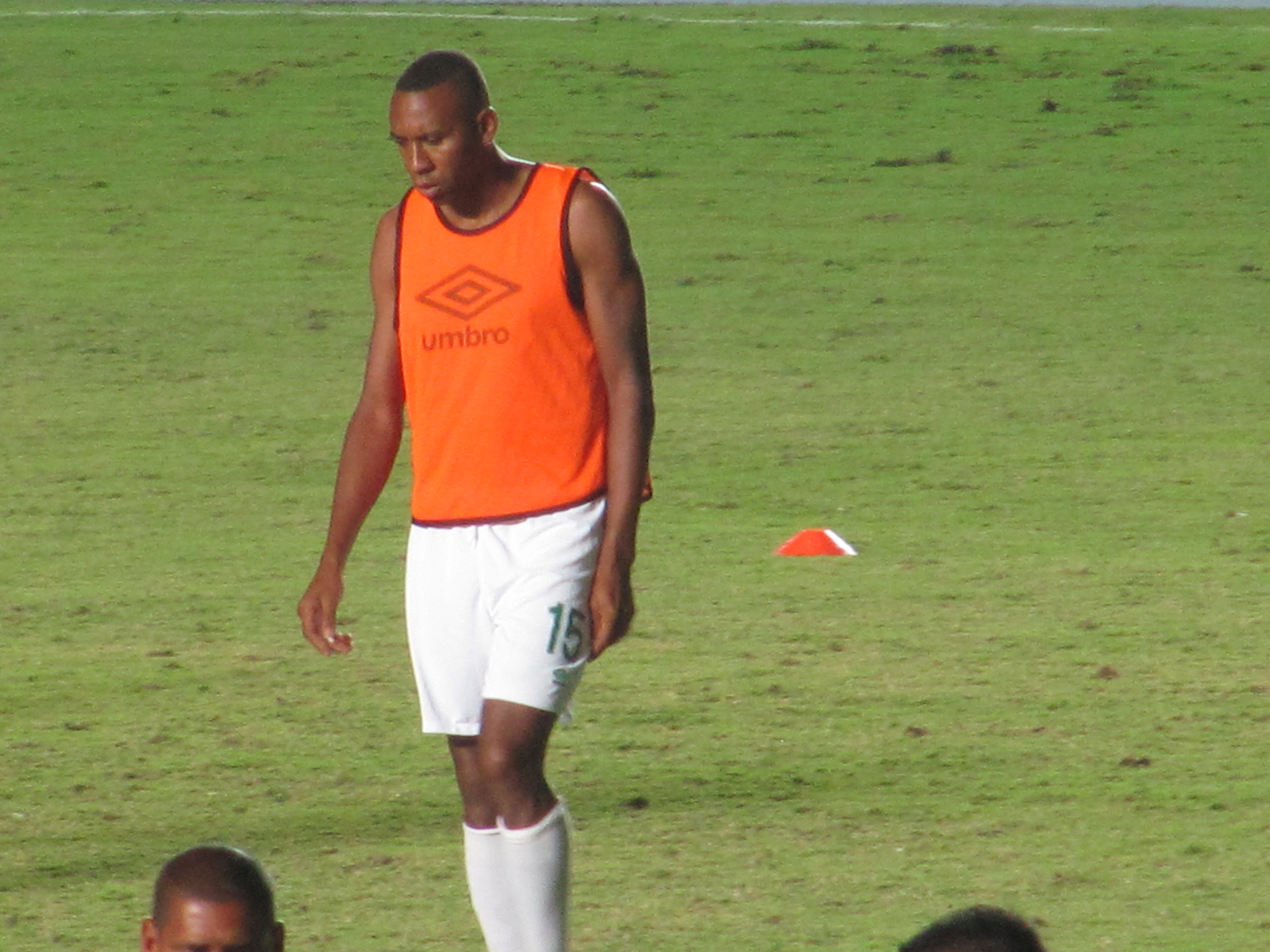
- Viáfara with Deportivo Cali in 2014

Personal information
- Full name: Jhon Eduis Viáfara Mina
- Date of birth: 27 October 1978 (age 47)
- Place of birth: Robles, Colombia
- Height: 1.88 m (6 ft 2 in)
- Position: Midfielder

Senior career*
Years	Team	Apps	(Gls)
1999	Deportivo Pasto	44	(2)
2000–2001	América de Cali	37	(0)
2001–2002	Deportivo Pasto	18	(0)
2002–2005	Once Caldas	114	(9)
2005–2006	Portsmouth	14	(1)
2006	→ Real Sociedad (loan)	11	(0)
2006–2008	Southampton	76	(5)
2008–2009	Once Caldas	49	(3)
2010	La Equidad	35	(5)
2011	Atlético Junior	4	(0)
2011	Deportivo Pereira	17	(4)
2012	La Equidad	19	(4)
2012–2013	Independiente Medellín	35	(2)
2013–2014	Deportivo Cali	43	(0)
2015	Rionegro Águilas	5	(0)
Total		521	(35)

International career
2003–2010	Colombia	34	(1)
- * Club domestic league appearances and goals

Jhon Eduis Viáfara Mina (born 27 October 1978) is a Colombian former footballer who played as a midfielder.

He was part of the Once Caldas team that won the Copa Libertadores in 2004, and later played in Europe for rivals Portsmouth and Southampton in England, and Real Sociedad in Spain. With the Colombia national team, he went to the Copa América in 2004 and 2007.

In 2020, he was extradited to the United States to face charges of drug trafficking. He was convicted and sentenced to 11 years in U.S. federal prison.

== Club career ==
=== Early career ===
Born in the Colombian town of Robles, Viáfara came to international attention whilst playing for Once Caldas, for whom he was instrumental during his club's success in the 2004 Copa Libertadores, scoring with a long range strike in the final against Boca Juniors.

=== Portsmouth ===
His performances made him a regular in the Colombia national football team, and earned him a €2.2 million move to English club Portsmouth on 23 June 2005.

He played 14 league matches under Alain Perrin at Portsmouth, scoring one league goal, in a 2–1 loss at Manchester City on 27 August. Perrin was sacked and Viáfara was dropped by returned-manager Harry Redknapp.

On 30 January 2006, Viáfara was loaned for six months to Spanish club Real Sociedad of La Liga, along with Mark González of Liverpool. At the end of this deal, Real declined the chance to purchase Viáfara and he returned to Portsmouth again, after 11 matches played and two red cards.

=== Southampton ===
On 4 August 2006, Viáfara signed a three-year deal with Portsmouth's south-coast rivals Southampton of the Football League Championship. The transfer fee for the three-year deal was undisclosed, but was reported as in the region of £750,000. He appeared consistently in the 2006–07 season. He scored two goals in the Championship Play-off Semi-final Second Leg against Derby County on 15 May 2007, although it was not enough as Derby went on to win the tie in a penalty shootout.

In July 2008, manager Jan Poortvliet dropped Viáfara who was homesick and negotiating a move back to Once Caldas.

=== Return to Colombia ===
After Viáfara's return to Once Caldas the team's fortunes improved, they won their third Colombian league championship in Apertura 2009.

In 2010, he joined La Equidad and helped them to reach the final of the Apertura 2010 tournament as well as reaching the playoff stages of the Clausura 2010.

In 2011, he was signed by Junior and got off to an excellent start, scoring vital goals in both of the side's first two games in the Copa Libertadores 2011 group stages. He retired from football in 2015.

== International career ==
Viáfara went to the Copa América with Colombia in 2004 and 2007. He scored his only international goal on 25 March 2007 in a 3–1 friendly victory over Switzerland in Miami.

== Drug trafficking conviction ==
On 19 March 2019, Viáfara was arrested in Cali for drug traffic and cocaine exportation to the United States. He was extradited to the US in January 2020, where he denied allegations of being in the Clan del Golfo.

It was heard in court that Viáfara had been identified by the Drug Enforcement Administration in 2017, based on intelligence shared with Colombia, Panama and Costa Rica. He used the aliases "Futbolista" (Footballer), "Goleador" (Goalscorer) and "Makelele". He was indicted by a grand jury in June 2018. In March 2021, he was convicted and sentenced to 135 months in U.S. federal prison.

== Career statistics ==
International goals
No.	Date	Venue	Opponent	Score	Result	Competition
1	25 March 2007	Miami Orange Bowl, Miami, United States	Switzerland	1–2	1–3	Friendly

== Honours ==
América de Cali

- Copa Mustang: 2000

Once Caldas

- Copa Mustang: 2003, 2009
- Copa Libertadores: 2004
