= 2003 Categoría Primera A season =

Copa Mustang
- Season: 2003
- Champions: Apertura: Once Caldas (2nd title); Finalización: Deportes Tolima (1st title)
- Relegated: Centauros Villavicencio
- Copa Libertadores: Once Caldas; Deportes Tolima; Deportivo Cali
- Copa Sudamericana: Junior; Millonarios
- Matches: 376
- Goals: 897 (2.39 per match)
- Top goalscorer: Apertura: Arnulfo Valentierra (13 goals); Finalización: Léider Preciado (17 goals)

The 2003 Categoría Primera A season was the 55th season of Colombia's top-flight football league. The season started on 2 February and concluded on 21 December 2003. Independiente Medellín were the defending champions, having won the 2002 Finalización tournament.

== Torneo Apertura ==
The Torneo Apertura (officially the 2003 Copa Mustang I for sponsorship reasons) was the first tournament of the season. The tournament began on February 2 and ended on June 8.

=== First stage ===
==== Standings ====
| Pos | Team | Pld | W | D | L | GF | GA | GD | Pts | Qualification |
|---|---|---|---|---|---|---|---|---|---|---|
| 1 | Once Caldas | 18 | 10 | 5 | 3 | 26 | 15 | +11 | 35 | Advanced to the Semifinals |
| 2 | Millonarios | 18 | 8 | 7 | 3 | 23 | 14 | +9 | 31 | Advanced to the Semifinals |
| 3 | América de Cali | 18 | 8 | 7 | 3 | 31 | 23 | +8 | 31 | Advanced to the Semifinals |
| 4 | Centauros Villavicencio | 18 | 7 | 8 | 3 | 24 | 21 | +3 | 29 | Advanced to the Semifinals |
| 5 | Deportivo Cali | 18 | 8 | 4 | 6 | 27 | 22 | +5 | 28 | Advanced to the Semifinals |
| 6 | Junior | 18 | 8 | 4 | 6 | 19 | 17 | +2 | 28 | Advanced to the Semifinals |
| 7 | Unión Magdalena | 18 | 7 | 5 | 6 | 22 | 22 | 0 | 26 | Advanced to the Semifinals |
| 8 | Deportivo Pereira | 18 | 7 | 5 | 6 | 22 | 25 | −3 | 26 | Advanced to the Semifinals |
| 9 | Atlético Huila | 18 | 6 | 8 | 4 | 22 | 22 | 0 | 26 | |
| 10 | Independiente Medellín | 18 | 7 | 4 | 7 | 29 | 23 | +6 | 25 | |
| 11 | Atlético Bucaramanga | 18 | 6 | 7 | 5 | 21 | 20 | +1 | 25 | |
| 12 | Deportes Tolima | 18 | 6 | 4 | 8 | 24 | 24 | 0 | 22 | |
| 13 | Envigado | 18 | 6 | 4 | 8 | 20 | 23 | −3 | 22 | |
| 14 | Atlético Nacional | 18 | 6 | 2 | 10 | 17 | 20 | −3 | 20 | |
| 15 | Deportivo Pasto | 18 | 4 | 7 | 7 | 15 | 18 | −3 | 19 | |
| 16 | Santa Fe | 18 | 5 | 3 | 10 | 15 | 23 | −8 | 18 | |
| 17 | Cortuluá | 18 | 2 | 9 | 7 | 15 | 24 | −9 | 15 | |
| 18 | Deportes Quindío | 18 | 3 | 4 | 11 | 13 | 28 | −15 | 13 | |

Source: RSSSF

=== Semifinals ===
The second phase of the tournament consisted of two groups of four teams each. This was played by the best eight teams from the first phase of the tournament. The winners of each group qualified for the Finals.

==== Group A ====
===== Standings =====
| Pos | Team | Pld | W | D | L | GF | GA | GD | Pts | Qualification |
|---|---|---|---|---|---|---|---|---|---|---|
| 1 | Once Caldas | 6 | 4 | 2 | 0 | 14 | 3 | +11 | 14 | Advanced to the Finals |
| 2 | Deportivo Cali | 6 | 3 | 2 | 1 | 10 | 5 | +5 | 11 | |
| 3 | América de Cali | 6 | 2 | 0 | 4 | 6 | 12 | −6 | 6 | |
| 4 | Unión Magdalena | 6 | 0 | 2 | 4 | 3 | 13 | −10 | 2 | |

Source: RSSSF

===== Results =====
| Home \ Away | AME | CAL | ONC | MAG |
|---|---|---|---|---|
| América de Cali | | 0–3 | 1–3 | 4–1 |
| Deportivo Cali | 3–0 | | 0–3 | 2–0 |
| Once Caldas | 2–0 | 1–1 | | 4–0 |
| Unión Magdalena | 0–1 | 1–1 | 1–1 | |

Source: RSSSF
Legend: Blue = home team win; Yellow = draw; Red = away team win.

==== Group B ====
===== Standings =====
| Pos | Team | Pld | W | D | L | GF | GA | GD | Pts | Qualification |
|---|---|---|---|---|---|---|---|---|---|---|
| 1 | Junior | 6 | 4 | 0 | 2 | 9 | 5 | +4 | 12 | Advanced to the Finals |
| 2 | Deportivo Pereira | 6 | 3 | 0 | 3 | 9 | 7 | +2 | 9 | |
| 3 | Millonarios | 6 | 2 | 1 | 3 | 7 | 9 | −2 | 7 | |
| 4 | Centauros Villavicencio | 6 | 2 | 1 | 3 | 5 | 9 | −4 | 7 | |

Source: RSSSF

===== Results =====
| Home \ Away | CEN | PER | JUN | MIL |
|---|---|---|---|---|
| Centauros Villavicencio | | 0–3 | 1–0 | 3–1 |
| Deportivo Pereira | 3–0 | | 0–2 | 1–0 |
| Junior | 1–0 | 3–1 | | 2–1 |
| Millonarios | 1–1 | 2–1 | 2–1 | |

Source: RSSSF
Legend: Blue = home team win; Yellow = draw; Red = away team win.

=== Finals ===
| Date | City | Home | Score | Away |
|---|---|---|---|---|
| June 5 | Barranquilla | Junior | 0–0 | Once Caldas |
| June 8 | Manizales | Once Caldas | 1–0 | Junior |
Once Caldas won 1–0 on aggregate score

=== Top goalscorers ===
| Rank | Name | Club | Goals |
|---|---|---|---|
| 1 | (Colombia) Arnulfo Valentierra | Once Caldas | 13 |
| 2 | (Colombia) Julián Vásquez | América de Cali | 11 |
| 3 | (Colombia) Leonardo Fabio Moreno | América de Cali | 10 |
| 4 | (Colombia) Wilson Carpintero | Atlético Bucaramanga | 9 |

== Torneo Finalización ==
The Torneo Finalización (officially the 2003 Copa Mustang II for sponsorship reasons) was the second tournament of the season. The tournament began on July 13 and ended on December 21.

=== First stage ===
==== Standings ====
| Pos | Team | Pld | W | D | L | GF | GA | GD | Pts | Qualification |
|---|---|---|---|---|---|---|---|---|---|---|
| 1 | Deportivo Cali | 18 | 10 | 4 | 4 | 34 | 18 | +16 | 34 | Advanced to the Semifinals |
| 2 | Atlético Nacional | 18 | 9 | 5 | 4 | 23 | 14 | +9 | 32 | Advanced to the Semifinals |
| 3 | Unión Magdalena | 18 | 9 | 1 | 8 | 20 | 18 | +2 | 28 | Advanced to the Semifinals |
| 4 | Independiente Medellín | 18 | 8 | 4 | 6 | 20 | 15 | +5 | 28 | Advanced to the Semifinals |
| 5 | Deportivo Pasto | 18 | 8 | 4 | 6 | 20 | 19 | +1 | 28 | Advanced to the Semifinals |
| 6 | Deportes Tolima | 18 | 7 | 6 | 5 | 22 | 17 | +5 | 27 | Advanced to the Semifinals |
| 7 | Millonarios | 18 | 8 | 2 | 8 | 21 | 21 | 0 | 26 | Advanced to the Semifinals |
| 8 | Junior | 18 | 7 | 4 | 7 | 24 | 28 | −4 | 25 | Advanced to the Semifinals |
| 9 | Deportivo Pereira | 18 | 6 | 7 | 5 | 20 | 18 | +2 | 25 | |
| 10 | Deportes Quindío | 18 | 6 | 7 | 5 | 21 | 20 | +1 | 25 | |
| 11 | América de Cali | 18 | 6 | 7 | 5 | 23 | 23 | 0 | 25 | |
| 12 | Atlético Huila | 18 | 6 | 6 | 6 | 23 | 25 | −2 | 24 | |
| 13 | Santa Fe | 18 | 5 | 9 | 4 | 15 | 13 | +2 | 24 | |
| 14 | Once Caldas | 18 | 4 | 6 | 8 | 20 | 26 | −6 | 18 | |
| 15 | Envigado | 18 | 3 | 9 | 6 | 18 | 21 | −3 | 18 | |
| 16 | Atlético Bucaramanga | 18 | 4 | 5 | 9 | 24 | 30 | −6 | 17 | |
| 17 | Cortuluá | 18 | 4 | 5 | 9 | 16 | 26 | −10 | 17 | |
| 18 | Centauros Villavicencio | 18 | 4 | 5 | 9 | 15 | 27 | −12 | 17 | |

Source: RSSSF

=== Semifinals ===
==== Group A ====
===== Standings =====
| Pos | Team | Pld | W | D | L | GF | GA | GD | Pts | Qualification |
|---|---|---|---|---|---|---|---|---|---|---|
| 1 | Deportivo Cali | 6 | 3 | 3 | 0 | 10 | 6 | +4 | 12 | Advanced to the Finals |
| 2 | Millonarios | 6 | 3 | 1 | 2 | 9 | 7 | +2 | 10 | |
| 3 | Unión Magdalena | 6 | 2 | 3 | 1 | 7 | 6 | +1 | 9 | |
| 4 | Deportivo Pasto | 6 | 0 | 1 | 5 | 4 | 11 | −7 | 1 | |

Source: RSSSF

===== Results =====
| Home \ Away | CAL | PAS | MIL | MAG |
|---|---|---|---|---|
| Deportivo Cali | | 3–1 | 1–1 | 2–2 |
| Deportivo Pasto | 0–1 | | 1–3 | 2–2 |
| Millonarios | 2–3 | 1–0 | | 1–0 |
| Unión Magdalena | 0–0 | 1–0 | 2–1 | |

Source: RSSSF
Legend: Blue = home team win; Yellow = draw; Red = away team win.

==== Group B ====
===== Standings =====
| Pos | Team | Pld | W | D | L | GF | GA | GD | Pts | Qualification |
|---|---|---|---|---|---|---|---|---|---|---|
| 1 | Deportes Tolima | 6 | 3 | 1 | 2 | 8 | 7 | +1 | 10 (Note: Away goals for: Deportes Tolima 4, Junior 1) | Advances to the Finals |
| 2 | Junior | 6 | 3 | 1 | 2 | 8 | 7 | +1 | 10 | |
| 3 | Atlético Nacional | 6 | 3 | 0 | 3 | 8 | 8 | 0 | 9 | |
| 4 | Independiente Medellín | 6 | 2 | 0 | 4 | 8 | 10 | −2 | 6 | |

Source: RSSSF

===== Results =====
| Home \ Away | NAC | TOL | DIM | JUN |
|---|---|---|---|---|
| Atlético Nacional | | 1–2 | 4–2 | 1–0 |
| Deportes Tolima | 2–0 | | 1–0 | 1–1 |
| Independiente Medellín | 1–2 | 2–0 | | 1–0 |
| Junior | 1–0 | 3–2 | 3–2 | |

Source: RSSSF
Legend: Blue = home team win; Yellow = draw; Red = away team win.

=== Finals ===
| Date | City | Home | Score | Away |
|---|---|---|---|---|
| December 17 | Ibagué | Deportes Tolima | 2–0 | Deportivo Cali |
| December 21 | Cali | Deportivo Cali | 3–1 | Deportes Tolima |
Tied 3–3 on aggregate score, Deportes Tolima won 4–2 on penalty kicks

=== Top goalscorers ===
| Rank | Name | Club | Goals |
|---|---|---|---|
| 1 | (Colombia) Léider Preciado | Deportivo Cali | 17 |
| 2 | (Brazil) Rogeiro Pereira | Deportes Tolima | 12 |
| 3 | (Colombia) Carlos Castillo | Deportivo Cali | 10 |
| 3 | (Colombia) Julián Téllez | Millonarios | 10 |

== Aggregate table ==
An aggregate table including all games that a team played during the year was used to determine berths to both the Copa Libertadores and the Copa Sudamericana. The best-placed non-champion qualified for the 2004 Copa Libertadores along with both champions of the season, while the second and third best-placed non-champions qualified for the 2004 Copa Sudamericana.

| Pos | Team | Pld | W | D | L | GF | GA | GD | Pts | Qualification |
|---|---|---|---|---|---|---|---|---|---|---|
| 1 | Deportivo Cali | 50 | 25 | 13 | 12 | 84 | 54 | +30 | 88 | 2004 Copa Libertadores |
| 2 | Junior | 50 | 22 | 10 | 18 | 60 | 58 | +2 | 76 | 2004 Copa Sudamericana |
| 3 | Millonarios | 48 | 21 | 11 | 16 | 60 | 51 | +9 | 74 | 2004 Copa Sudamericana |
| 4 | Once Caldas (C) | 44 | 19 | 14 | 11 | 61 | 44 | +17 | 71 | 2004 Copa Libertadores |
| 5 | Unión Magdalena | 48 | 18 | 11 | 19 | 52 | 59 | −7 | 65 | |
| 6 | Deportes Tolima (C) | 44 | 17 | 11 | 16 | 57 | 51 | +6 | 62 | 2004 Copa Libertadores |
| 7 | América de Cali | 42 | 16 | 14 | 12 | 60 | 58 | +2 | 62 | |
| 8 | Atlético Nacional | 42 | 18 | 7 | 17 | 48 | 42 | +6 | 61 | |
| 9 | Deportivo Pereira | 42 | 15 | 15 | 12 | 51 | 50 | +1 | 60 | |
| 10 | Independiente Medellín | 42 | 17 | 8 | 17 | 57 | 48 | +9 | 59 | |
| 11 | Centauros Villavicencio | 42 | 13 | 14 | 15 | 44 | 57 | −13 | 53 | |
| 12 | Atlético Huila | 36 | 12 | 14 | 10 | 45 | 47 | −2 | 50 | |
| 13 | Deportivo Pasto | 42 | 12 | 12 | 18 | 39 | 48 | −9 | 48 | |
| 14 | Atlético Bucaramanga | 36 | 10 | 12 | 14 | 45 | 50 | −5 | 42 | |
| 15 | Santa Fe | 36 | 10 | 12 | 14 | 30 | 36 | −6 | 42 | |
| 16 | Envigado | 36 | 9 | 13 | 14 | 38 | 44 | −6 | 40 | |
| 17 | Deportes Quindío | 36 | 9 | 11 | 16 | 34 | 48 | −14 | 38 | |
| 18 | Cortuluá | 36 | 6 | 14 | 16 | 31 | 50 | −19 | 32 | |

Source: RSSSF
(C) Champions

== Relegation ==
| Pos | Team | Pld | Pts | Avg | Relegation |
|---|---|---|---|---|---|
| 1 | Deportivo Cali | 108 | 222 | 2.056 | |
| 2 | Once Caldas | 108 | 198 | 1.833 | |
| 3 | América de Cali | 108 | 181 | 1.676 | |
| 4 | Atlético Nacional | 108 | 175 | 1.62 | |
| 5 | Santa Fe | 108 | 175 | 1.62 | |
| 6 | Deportivo Pasto | 108 | 173 | 1.602 | |
| 7 | Independiente Medellín | 108 | 172 | 1.593 | |
| 8 | Deportes Tolima | 108 | 168 | 1.556 | |
| 9 | Millonarios | 108 | 168 | 1.556 | |
| 10 | Deportivo Pereira | 108 | 162 | 1.5 | |
| 11 | Unión Magdalena | 108 | 162 | 1.5 | |
| 12 | Junior | 108 | 155 | 1.435 | |
| 13 | Envigado | 108 | 152 | 1.407 | |
| 14 | Atlético Bucaramanga | 108 | 148 | 1.37 | |
| 15 | Cortuluá | 108 | 146 | 1.352 | |
| 16 | Atlético Huila | 108 | 139 | 1.287 | |
| 17 | Deportes Quindío | 108 | 138 | 1.278 | |
| 18 | Centauros Villavicencio | 108 | 135 | 1.25 | Relegated to the Categoría Primera B |

Rules for classification: 1st average; 2nd wins; 3rd goal difference; 4th number of goals scored; 5th away goals scored.
