= Samuel Vanegas =

Colombian footballer (born 1976)

Samuel Antonio Vanegas Luna (born 8 September 1976) is a Colombian former professional footballer who played as a defender.

== Early life ==
While playing youth football, Vanegas worked as a construction worker.

== Career ==
Besides Colombia, Vanegas played in Brazil and Ecuador. Vanegas won the 2004 Copa Libertadores with Colombian side Once Caldas. He also won three league titles with three different Colombian sides. In 2013, he signed for Colombian side Junior, which caused controversy.

== Post-playing career ==
After retiring from professional football, Vanegas worked as a youth manager.

== Style of play ==
Vanegas was known for his aggressive temperament as a player.

== Personal life ==
During his playing career, Vanegas was afraid of needles.

== Honours ==
Atlético Nacional

- Campeonato Colombiano: 1999
- Copa Merconorte: 2000

Once Caldas

- Categoría Primera A: 2003 Apertura
- Copa Libertadores: 2004

Independiente Medellín

- Categoría Primera A: 2009 Finalización
