= Miguel Rojas (footballer) =

Colombian footballer (born 1977)

Personal information
- Full name: Miguel Alberto Rojas Lasso
- Date of birth: 5 March 1977 (age 49)
- Place of birth: Aipe, Huila, Colombia
- Height: 1.78 m (5 ft 10 in)
- Position: Defender

Senior career*
Years	Team	Apps	(Gls)
1999–2003	Atlético Huila	142	(3)
2003–2006	Once Caldas	56	(1)
2006–2007	Chicó	41	(0)
2007–2008	Once Caldas	21	(1)
2008–2009	Millonarios	12	(0)
2010	Alianza Petrolera		
2011	Atlético Huila	2	(0)

International career
2005	Colombia	1	(0)
- * Club domestic league appearances and goals

Miguel Alberto Rojas Lasso (born 5 March 1977) is a retired Colombian international footballer.

== Career ==
Born in Aipe, Huila Department, Rojas began playing football with local side Atlético Huila. He made his professional debut in 1999 and would stay at the club until 2003. He moved to Once Caldas, where he would win the Colombian championship as well as the Copa Libertadores 2004. A brief spell with Chicó F.C. followed before a return to Once Caldas. Next, Rojas moved to Club Deportivo Los Millonarios.

In February 2010, Rojas signed for Colombian second division side Alianza Petrolera.

In 2005, Rojas represented the Colombia national football team for his first and only time, entering as a second-half substitute in a friendly against Guatemala played in Los Angeles.

== Titles ==
Season	Club	Title
2004	Once Caldas	Copa Libertadores
