= 2004 Copa Libertadores =

45th season of Copa Libertadores

2004 Copa Libertadores de América
2004 Copa Toyota Libertadores de América 2004 Copa Toyota Libertadores da América

Tournament details
- Dates: February 3 - July 1
- Teams: 36 (from 11 associations)

Final positions
- Champions: (Colombia) Once Caldas (1st title)
- Runners-up: (Argentina) Boca Juniors

Tournament statistics
- Matches played: 140
- Goals scored: 383 (2.74 per match)
- Top scorer(s): (Brazil) Luís Fabiano (8 goals)

The 2004 Copa Libertadores de América (officially the 2004 Copa Toyota Libertadores de América for sponsorship reasons) was the 45th edition of the Copa Libertadores, CONMEBOL's premier annual international club tournament.

The tournament was won by Colombian club Once Caldas defeating defending champions Boca Juniors 2–0 on a penalty shoot-out. This was the second time, in the history of the tournament, that a team from Colombia won the Copa Libertadores. The first time was during Atlético Nacional's successful campaign.

This was the last Copa Libertadores in which the away goals rule would not be used in every two-legged knockout round. However, starting in the 2008 Copa Libertadores, the away goals rule was removed from the finals.

== Group stage ==
- Teams in green qualified directly to the Round of 16
- Teams in yellow qualified to the playoff round

=== Group 1 ===
Pos	Team	Pld	W	D	L	GF	GA	GD	Pts	AME	SÃO	PEÑ	TS
1	(Mexico) América	6	4	1	1	11	5	+6	13		2–1	3–1	4–0
2	(Brazil) São Caetano	6	2	2	2	10	8	+2	8	1–2		1–1	4–2
3	(Uruguay) Peñarol	6	2	2	2	9	7	+2	8	2–0	1–1		4–0
4	(Bolivia) The Strongest	6	1	1	4	4	14	−10	4	0–0	0–2	2–0	

Legend: Blue = home team win; Yellow = draw; Red = away team win.

=== Group 2 ===
Pos	Team	Pld	W	D	L	GF	GA	GD	Pts	ONC	UAM	VEL	FEN
1	(Colombia) Once Caldas	6	4	1	1	11	6	+5	13		2–1	2–0	3–0
2	(Venezuela) Unión Atlético Maracaibo	6	2	2	2	10	9	+1	8	1–2		4–2	1–1
3	(Argentina) Vélez Sársfield	6	2	1	3	7	9	−2	7	2–0	1–1		1–0
4	(Uruguay) Fénix	6	1	2	3	6	10	−4	5	2–2	1–2	2–1	

Legend: Blue = home team win; Yellow = draw; Red = away team win.

=== Group 3 ===
Pos	Team	Pld	W	D	L	GF	GA	GD	Pts	CRU	SAN	CAR	UC
1	(Brazil) Cruzeiro	6	4	1	1	15	6	+9	13		1–1	3–1	5–0
2	(Mexico) Santos Laguna	6	3	3	0	10	6	+4	12	1–0		3–1	2–2
3	(Venezuela) Caracas	6	2	0	4	8	12	−4	6	2–3	0–1		1–0
4	(Chile) Universidad de Concepción	6	0	2	4	7	16	−9	2	1–3	2–2	2–3	

Legend: Blue = home team win; Yellow = draw; Red = away team win.

=== Group 4 ===
Pos	Team	Pld	W	D	L	GF	GA	GD	Pts	SÃO	LDU	ALI	COB
1	(Brazil) São Paulo	6	5	0	1	11	7	+4	15		1–0	3–1	3–1
2	(Ecuador) LDU Quito	6	4	0	2	13	3	+10	12	3–0		3–0	5–1
3	(Peru) Alianza Lima	6	3	0	3	6	8	−2	9	1–2	1–0		2–0
4	(Chile) Cobreloa	6	0	0	6	3	15	−12	0	1–2	0–1	0–2	

Legend: Blue = home team win; Yellow = draw; Red = away team win.

=== Group 5 ===
Pos	Team	Pld	W	D	L	GF	GA	GD	Pts	NAC	IND	CIE	ELN
1	(Uruguay) Nacional	6	3	3	0	7	4	+3	12		0–0	1–0	3–2
2	(Argentina) Independiente	6	2	2	2	9	7	+2	8	1–1		4–2	2–0
3	(Peru) Cienciano	6	2	1	3	10	12	−2	7	1–2	3–2		1–0
4	(Ecuador) El Nacional	6	1	2	3	6	9	−3	5	0–0	1–0	3–3	

Legend: Blue = home team win; Yellow = draw; Red = away team win.

=== Group 6 ===
Pos	Team	Pld	W	D	L	GF	GA	GD	Pts	RIV	TAC	TOL	LIB
1	(Argentina) River Plate	6	3	2	1	10	6	+4	11		2–2	1–0	4–1
2	(Venezuela) Deportivo Táchira	6	2	4	0	8	4	+4	10	0–0		2–0	2–0
3	(Colombia) Deportes Tolima	6	1	2	3	6	9	−3	5	2–3	1–1		3–2
4	(Paraguay) Libertad	6	1	2	3	5	10	−5	5	1–0	1–1	0–0	

Legend: Blue = home team win; Yellow = draw; Red = away team win.

=== Group 7 ===
Pos	Team	Pld	W	D	L	GF	GA	GD	Pts	SAN	BAR	GUA	JW
1	(Brazil) Santos	6	5	1	0	16	6	+10	16		1–0	2–2	5–0
2	(Ecuador) Barcelona	6	2	2	2	9	6	+3	8	1–3		2–0	4–0
3	(Paraguay) Guaraní	6	1	3	2	6	7	−1	6	1–2	0–0		3–1
4	(Bolivia) Jorge Wilstermann	6	0	2	4	5	17	−12	2	2–3	2–2	0–0	

Legend: Blue = home team win; Yellow = draw; Red = away team win.

=== Group 8 ===
Pos	Team	Pld	W	D	L	GF	GA	GD	Pts	BOC	CAL	BOL	COL
1	(Argentina) Boca Juniors	6	4	0	2	10	4	+6	12		3–0	3–0	2–0
2	(Colombia) Deportivo Cali	6	3	0	3	9	9	0	9	0–1		3–1	3–1
3	(Bolivia) Bolívar	6	3	0	3	7	9	−2	9	3–1	1–0		2–0
4	(Chile) Colo-Colo	6	2	0	4	6	10	−4	6	1–0	2–3	2–0	

Legend: Blue = home team win; Yellow = draw; Red = away team win.

=== Group 9 ===
Pos	Team	Pld	W	D	L	GF	GA	GD	Pts	SC	CEN	COR	OLI
1	(Peru) Sporting Cristal	6	3	1	2	13	9	+4	10		4–1	4–1	3–2
2	(Argentina) Rosario Central	6	3	1	2	8	8	0	10	1–1		2–0	2–1
3	(Brazil) Coritiba	6	2	2	2	7	8	−1	8	2–0	2–0		1–1
4	(Paraguay) Olimpia	6	1	2	3	7	10	−3	5	2–1	0–2	1–1	

Legend: Blue = home team win; Yellow = draw; Red = away team win.

== Playoff round ==
April 28, 2004
21:50 (UTC-3)

São Caetano (Brazil)	2 – 2 (4–2 PSO)	(Argentina) Independiente

Estádio Anacleto Campanella, São Caetano do Sul

April 29, 2004

Barcelona (Ecuador)	6 – 1	(Venezuela) Unión Atlético Maracaibo

Estadio Isidro Romero Carbo, Guayaquil

== Knockout stage ==
=== Bracket ===
Round of 16
(Colombia) Once Caldas	0	1	1 (4)
(Ecuador) Barcelona	0	1	1 (2)
(Brazil) Santos	2	2	4 (5)
(Ecuador) LDU Quito	4	0	4 (3)
(Uruguay) Nacional	0	2	2
(Venezuela) Deportivo Táchira	3	2	5
(Brazil) São Paulo	0	2	2 (5)
(Argentina) Rosario Central	1	1	2 (4)
(Brazil) Cruzeiro	0	2	2 (0)
(Colombia) Deportivo Cali	1	1	2 (3)
(Argentina) River Plate	1	1	2 (4)
(Mexico) Santos Laguna	0	2	2 (3)
(Argentina) Boca Juniors	3	2	5
(Peru) Sporting Cristal	2	1	3
(Mexico) América	1	1	2
(Brazil) São Caetano	1	2	3

Quarterfinals
(Colombia) Once Caldas	1	1	2
(Brazil) Santos	1	0	1
(Venezuela) Deportivo Táchira	0	1	1
(Brazil) São Paulo	3	4	7
(Colombia) Deportivo Cali	0	1	1
(Argentina) River Plate	1	3	4
(Argentina) Boca Juniors	0	1	1 (4)
(Brazil) São Caetano	0	1	1 (3)

Semifinals
(Colombia) Once Caldas	0	2	2
(Brazil) São Paulo	0	1	1
(Argentina) River Plate	0	2	2 (4)
(Argentina) Boca Juniors	1	1	2 (5)

Finals
(Colombia) Once Caldas	0	1	1 (2)
(Argentina) Boca Juniors	0	1	1 (0)

=== Round of 16 ===
First leg matches were played between May 4, 2004, and May 6, 2004. Second leg matches were played between May 11, 2004, and May 13, 2004.

Team 1	Agg.	Team 2	1st leg	2nd leg
São Caetano (Brazil)	3–2	(Mexico) América	2–1	1–1
Barcelona (Ecuador)	1–1 (2–4p)	(Colombia) Once Caldas	0–0	1–1
Deportivo Cali (Colombia)	2–2 (3–0p)	(Brazil) Cruzeiro	1–0	1–2
Rosario Central (Argentina)	2–2 (4–5p)	(Brazil) São Paulo	1–0	1–2
Deportivo Táchira (Venezuela)	5–2	(Uruguay) Nacional	3–0	2–2
Santos Laguna (Mexico)	2–2 (3–4p)	(Argentina) River Plate	0–1	2–1
LDU Quito (Ecuador)	4–4 (3–5p)	(Brazil) Santos	4–2	0–2
Sporting Cristal (Peru)	3–5	(Argentina) Boca Juniors	2–3	1–2

=== Quarterfinals ===
First leg matches were played on May 20, 2004, and May 21, 2004. Second leg matches were played between May 25, 2004, and May 27, 2004.

Team 1	Agg.	Team 2	1st leg	2nd leg
São Caetano (Brazil)	1–1 (3–4p)	(Argentina) Boca Juniors	0–0	1–1
Santos (Brazil)	1–2	(Colombia) Once Caldas	1–1	0–1
River Plate (Argentina)	4–1	(Colombia) Deportivo Cali	1–0	3–1
São Paulo (Brazil)	7–1	(Venezuela) Deportivo Táchira	3–0	4–1

=== Semifinals ===
First leg matches were played on June 9, 2004, and June 10, 2004. Second leg matches were played on June 16, 2004, and June 17, 2004.

Team 1	Agg.	Team 2	1st leg	2nd leg
Boca Juniors (Argentina)	2–2 (5–4p)	(Argentina) River Plate	1–0	1–2
São Paulo (Brazil)	1–2	(Colombia) Once Caldas	0–0	1–2

=== Finals ===
First leg match was played on June 23, 2004. Second leg match was played on July 2, 2004.

Team 1	Agg.	Team 2	1st leg	2nd leg
Boca Juniors (Argentina)	1–1 (0–2p)	(Colombia) Once Caldas	0–0	1–1

Copa Libertadores de América
2004 champion

First title
