= List of Copa Libertadores winning players =

This is a list of association footballers who have received a winner's medal for playing on a winning team in the Copa Libertadores. Some players have received medals without playing in the final match: either for being unused substitutes, or, more recently, for being in the squad in earlier rounds of the tournament.

Player	Nationality	Club(s)	Titles won	Years	Notes
Luis Maidana	Uruguay	Peñarol	2	1960, 1961	
William Martínez	Uruguay	Peñarol	2	1960, 1961	Captain in 1960 and 1961
Salvador	Brazil	Peñarol	1	1960	
Santiago Pino	Uruguay	Peñarol	1	1960	
Néstor Gonçalves	Uruguay	Peñarol	3	1960, 1961, 1966	Captain in 1966
Walter Aguerre	Uruguay	Peñarol	2	1960, 1961	
Luis Cubilla	Uruguay	Peñarol, Nacional	3	1960, 1961, 1971	
Carlos Abel Linazza	Uruguay	Peñarol	1	1960	
Alberto Spencer	Ecuador	Peñarol	3	1960, 1961, 1966	Top Scorer in 1960 and 1962.
Júpiter Crescio	Uruguay	Peñarol	1	1960	
Carlos Borges	Uruguay	Peñarol	1	1960	
Francisco Majewski	Uruguay	Peñarol	1	1960	
José Mario Griecco	Uruguay	Peñarol	1	1960	
Juan Eduardo Hohberg	Uruguay	Peñarol	1	1960	
Pedro Cubilla	Uruguay	Peñarol	1	1960	
Ángel Cabrera	Uruguay	Peñarol	2	1960, 1961	
Omar Caetano	Uruguay	Peñarol	2	1961, 1966	
Núber Cano	Uruguay	Peñarol	1	1961	
Edgardo González	Uruguay	Peñarol	1	1961	
Roberto Matosas	Uruguay	Peñarol	1	1961	
Ernesto Ledesma	Uruguay	Peñarol	1	1961	
José Sasía	Uruguay	Peñarol	1	1961	
Juan Joya	Peru	Peñarol	2	1961, 1966	
Gilmar	Brazil	Santos	2	1962, 1963	
Mauro	Brazil	Santos	2	1962, 1963	
Calvet	Brazil	Santos	2	1962, 1963	
Lima	Brazil	Santos	2	1962, 1963	
Zito	Brazil	Santos	2	1962, 1963	Captain in 1962 and 1963.
Dalmo	Brazil	Santos	2	1962, 1963	
Dorval	Brazil	Santos	2	1962, 1963	
Mengálvio	Brazil	Santos	1	1962	
Pagão	Brazil	Santos	1	1962	
Coutinho	Brazil	Santos	2	1962, 1963	Top Scorer in 1962.
Pepe	Brazil	Santos	2	1962, 1963	
Pelé	Brazil	Santos	2	1962, 1963	Top Scorer in 1965.
Geraldino	Brazil	Santos	1	1963	
Osvaldo Rossi	Brazil	Santos	1	1963	
Ismael	Brazil	Santos	1	1963	
Miguel Ángel Santoro	Argentina	Independiente	4	1964, 1965, 1972, 1973	
Pedro Prospitti	Argentina	Independiente	1	1964	
Héctor Zerrillo	Argentina	Independiente	1	1964	
Tomás Rolan	Uruguay	Independiente	2	1964, 1965	
Roberto Ferreiro	Argentina	Independiente	2	1964, 1965	
David Acevedo	Argentina	Independiente	2	1964, 1965	
Jorge Maldonado	Argentina	Independiente	2	1964, 1965	Captain in 1964
Rubén Navarro	Argentina	Independiente	2	1964, 1965	Captain in 1965
Raúl Bernao	Argentina	Independiente	2	1964, 1965	
Osvaldo Mura	Argentina	Independiente	2	1964, 1965	
Luis Eduardo Suárez	Argentina	Independiente	2	1964, 1965	
Mario Rodríguez Varela	Argentina	Independiente	2	1964, 1965	
Raúl Savoy	Argentina	Independiente	2	1964, 1965	
Osvaldo Toriani	Argentina	Independiente	2	1964, 1965	
Miguel Mori	Argentina	Independiente, Racing Club	3	1964, 1965, 1967	
Ricardo Pavoni	Uruguay	Independiente	5	1965, 1972, 1973, 1974, 1975	Captain in 1972, 1973, 1974 and 1975.
Vicente de la Mata Jr.	Argentina	Independiente	1	1965	
Roque Avallay	Argentina	Independiente	1	1965	
Ladislao Mazurkiewicz	Uruguay	Peñarol	1	1966	
Julio César Cortés	Uruguay	Peñarol	1	1966	
Julio Abbadie	Uruguay	Peñarol	1	1966	
Nelson Díaz	Uruguay	Peñarol	1	1966	
Juan Lezcano	Paraguay	Peñarol	1	1966	
Héctor Silva	Uruguay	Peñarol	1	1966	
Agustín Cejas	Argentina	Racing Club	1	1967	
Oscar Martín	Argentina	Racing Club	1	1967	
Roberto Perfumo	Argentina	Racing Club	1	1967	
Alfio Basile	Argentina	Racing Club	1	1967	
Rubén Díaz	Argentina	Racing Club	1	1967	
Juan Carlos Rulli	Argentina	Racing Club	1	1967	
Juan José Rodríguez	Argentina	Racing Club	1	1967	
Humberto Maschio	Italy	Racing Club	1	1967	Captain in 1967
Jaime Martinoli	Argentina	Racing Club	1	1967	
Norberto Raffo	Argentina	Racing Club	1	1967	Top scorer in 1967
João Cardoso	Brazil	Racing Club	1	1967	
Fernando Parenti	Argentina	Racing Club	1	1967	
Luis Carrizo	Argentina	Racing Club	1	1967	
Nelson Chabay	Uruguay	Racing Club	1	1967	
Juan Carlos Cárdenas	Argentina	Racing Club	1	1967	
Alberto José Poletti	Argentina	Estudiantes	3	1968, 1969, 1970	
Rodolfo Fucceneco	Argentina	Estudiantes	1	1968	
Hugo Spadaro	Argentina	Estudiantes	3	1968, 1969, 1970	
Raúl Madero	Argentina	Estudiantes	3	1968, 1969, 1970	
Oscar Malbernat	Argentina	Estudiantes	3	1968, 1969, 1970	Captain in 1968 and 1969
Carlos Pachamé	Argentina	Estudiantes	3	1968, 1969, 1970	
Carlos Bilardo	Argentina	Estudiantes	3	1968, 1969, 1970	
Eduardo Flores	Argentina	Estudiantes	3	1968, 1969, 1970	
Eduardo Manera	Argentina	Estudiantes	3	1968, 1969, 1970	
Juan Taverna	Argentina	Estudiantes	3	1968, 1969, 1970	
Felipe Ribaudo	Argentina	Estudiantes	2	1968, 1969	
Marcos Conigliaro	Argentina	Estudiantes	3	1968, 1969, 1970	
Héctor Baley	Argentina	Estudiantes	2	1969, 1970	
Juan Ramón Verón	Argentina	Estudiantes	3	1968, 1969, 1970	Captain in 1970
Luis Lavezzi	Argentina	Estudiantes	1	1968	
Néstor Togneri	Argentina	Estudiantes	3	1968, 1969, 1970	
Ramón Aguirre Suárez	Argentina	Estudiantes	3	1968, 1969, 1970	
Rubén Pagnanini	Argentina	Estudiantes	3	1968, 1969, 1970	
Christian Rudzki	Czechoslovakia	Estudiantes	2	1969, 1970	
Néstor Errea	Argentina	Estudiantes	1	1970	
Jorge Solari	Argentina	Estudiantes	1	1970	
Juan Echecopar	Argentina	Estudiantes	1	1970	
José Medina	Argentina	Estudiantes	1	1970	
Camilo Aguilar	Argentina	Estudiantes	1	1970	
Manga	Brazil	Nacional	1	1971	
Luis Ubiña	Uruguay	Nacional	1	1971	Captain in 1971
Atilio Ancheta	Uruguay	Nacional	1	1971	
Juan Masnik	Uruguay	Nacional	1	1971	
Juan Carlos Blanco	Uruguay	Nacional	2	1971, 1980	
Julio Montero Castillo	Uruguay	Nacional	1	1971	
Víctor Espárrago	Uruguay	Nacional	2	1971, 1980	Captain in 1980
Luis Artime	Argentina	Nacional	1	1971	Top scorer in 1971
Ildo Maneiro	Uruguay	Nacional	1	1971	
Julio Morales	Uruguay	Nacional	2	1971, 1980	
Ignacio Prieto	Chile	Nacional	1	1971	
Rúben Bareño	Uruguay	Nacional	1	1971	
Juan Martín Mujica	Uruguay	Nacional	1	1971	
Juan Carlos Mamelli	Argentina	Nacional	1	1971	
Eduardo Commisso	Argentina	Independiente	4	1972, 1973, 1974, 1975	
Francisco Sá	Argentina	Independiente, Boca Juniors	6	1972, 1973, 1974, 1975; 1977, 1978	
Luis Garisto	Argentina	Independiente	2	1972, 1973	
José Pastoriza	Argentina	Independiente	1	1972	
Dante Mircoli	Italy	Independiente	1	1972	
Miguel Ángel Raimondo	Argentina	Independiente	3	1972, 1973, 1974	
Alejandro Semenewicz	Argentina	Independiente	4	1972, 1973, 1974, 1975	
Agustín Balbuena	Argentina	Independiente	4	1972, 1973, 1974, 1975	
Rubén Galván	Argentina	Independiente	4	1972, 1973, 1974, 1975	
Eduardo Maglioni	Argentina	Independiente	3	1972, 1973, 1974	
Hugo Saggioratto	Argentina	Independiente	3	1972, 1974, 1975	
Carlos Bulla	Argentina	Independiente	1	1972	
Carlos Gay	Argentina	Independiente	4	1972, 1973, 1974, 1975	
Ricardo Bochini	Argentina	Independiente	4	1973, 1974, 1975, 1984	
José J. Martínez	Argentina	Independiente	1	1973	
Miguel A. Giachello	Argentina	Independiente	1	1973	
Mario Mendoza	Argentina	Independiente	1	1973	
Daniel Bertoni	Argentina	Independiente	3	1973, 1974, 1975	
Miguel Ángel López	Argentina	Independiente	2	1974, 1975	
Osvaldo Carrica	Argentina	Independiente	1	1974	
Luis Giribet	Argentina	Independiente	2	1974, 1975	
José Alberto Pérez	Argentina	Independiente	1	1975	
Percy Rojas	Peru	Independiente	1	1975	
Ricardo Ruiz Moreno	Argentina	Independiente	1	1975	
Raul	Brazil	Cruzeiro, Flamengo	2	1976; 1981	
Nelinho	Brazil	Cruzeiro	1	1976	
Morais	Brazil	Cruzeiro	1	1976	
Ozires	Brazil	Cruzeiro	1	1976	
Darci	Brazil	Cruzeiro	1	1976	
Vanderlei	Brazil	Cruzeiro	1	1976	
Isidoro	Brazil	Cruzeiro	1	1976	
Piazza	Brazil	Cruzeiro	1	1976	Captain in 1976
Roberto Batata	Brazil	Cruzeiro	1	1976	Posthumous award
Roberto César	Brazil	Cruzeiro	1	1976	
Silva	Brazil	Cruzeiro	1	1976	
Eduardo	Brazil	Cruzeiro	1	1976	
Zé Carlos	Brazil	Cruzeiro	1	1976	
Jairzinho	Brazil	Cruzeiro	1	1976	
Joãozinho	Brazil	Cruzeiro	1	1976	
Palhinha	Brazil	Cruzeiro	1	1976	
Valdo	Brazil	Cruzeiro	1	1976	
Eli Mendes	Brazil	Cruzeiro	1	1976	
Ronaldo	Brazil	Cruzeiro	1	1976	
Hélio Dias	Brazil	Cruzeiro	1	1976	
Vítor	Brazil	Cruzeiro	1	1976	
Kléber	Brazil	Cruzeiro	1	1976	
Mariano	Brazil	Cruzeiro	1	1976	
Hugo Gatti	Argentina	Boca Juniors	2	1977, 1978	
Vicente Pernía	Argentina	Boca Juniors	2	1977, 1978	
Roberto Mouzo	Argentina	Boca Juniors	2	1977, 1978	
Carlos Rodríguez	Argentina	Boca Juniors	2	1977, 1978	
Rubén Suñé	Argentina	Boca Juniors	2	1977, 1978	Captain in 1977 and 1978
Mario Zanabria	Argentina	Boca Juniors	2	1977, 1978	
Ernesto Mastrángelo	Argentina	Boca Juniors	2	1977, 1978	
Carlos Veglio	Argentina	Boca Juniors	2	1977, 1978	
Jorge Ribolzi	Argentina	Boca Juniors	2	1977, 1978	
Alberto Tarantini	Argentina	Boca Juniors	1	1977	
Daniel S. Pavón	Argentina	Boca Juniors	1	1977	
Darío Felman	Argentina	Boca Juniors	1	1977	
José Luis Tesare	Argentina	Boca Juniors	1	1977	
Héctor Bernabitti	Argentina	Boca Juniors	1	1977	
Carlos Ortíz	Argentina	Boca Juniors	1	1977	
Miguel Bordón	Argentina	Boca Juniors	1	1978	
Jorge Benítez	Argentina	Boca Juniors	1	1978	
Carlos Horacio Salinas	Argentina	Boca Juniors	1	1978	
Carlos Squeo	Argentina	Boca Juniors	1	1978	
Ever Hugo Almeida	Paraguay	Olimpia	2	1979, 1990	
Rubén Jiménez	Paraguay	Olimpia	1	1979	
Alicio Solalinde	Paraguay	Olimpia	1	1979	
Miguel A. Piazza	Uruguay	Olimpia	1	1979	
Enrique Villalba	Paraguay	Olimpia	1	1979	
Carlos Kiese	Paraguay	Olimpia	1	1979	
Luis Torres	Paraguay	Olimpia	1	1979	
Roberto Paredes	Paraguay	Olimpia	1	1979	
Osvaldo Aquino	Paraguay	Olimpia	1	1979	
Hugo Talavera	Paraguay	Olimpia	1	1979	Captain in 1979
Evaristo Isasi	Paraguay	Olimpia	1	1979	
Rogelio Delgado	Paraguay	Olimpia	1	1979	
Jorge Guasch	Paraguay	Olimpia	2	1979, 1990	Captain in 1990
Flaminio Sosa	Paraguay	Olimpia	1	1979	
Rodolfo Rodríguez	Uruguay	Nacional	1	1980	
José H. Moreira	Uruguay	Nacional	1	1980	
Hugo de León	Uruguay	Nacional, Grêmio	3	1980, 1983, 1988	Captain in 1983 and 1988
Washington González	Uruguay	Nacional	1	1980	
Eduardo de la Peña	Uruguay	Nacional	1	1980	
Arsenio Luzardo	Uruguay	Nacional	1	1980	
Alberto Bica	Uruguay	Nacional	1	1980	
Waldemar Victorino	Uruguay	Nacional	1	1980	
Dardo Pérez	Uruguay	Nacional	1	1980	
Denís Milar	Uruguay	Nacional	1	1980	
Wilmar Cabrera	Uruguay	Nacional	1	1980	
Leandro	Brazil	Flamengo	1	1981	
Marinho	Brazil	Flamengo	1	1981	
Mozer	Brazil	Flamengo	1	1981	
Júnior	Brazil	Flamengo	1	1981	
Andrade	Brazil	Flamengo	1	1981	
Tita	Brazil	Flamengo, Grêmio	2	1981; 1983	
Adílio	Brazil	Flamengo	1	1981	
Nunes	Brazil	Flamengo	1	1981	
Zico	Brazil	Flamengo	1	1981	Captain in 1981; Top Scorer in 1981.
Lico	Brazil	Flamengo	1	1981	
Nei Dias	Brazil	Flamengo	1	1981	
Anselmo	Brazil	Flamengo	1	1981	
Figueiredo	Brazil	Flamengo	1	1981	
Baroninho	Brazil	Flamengo	1	1981	
Vítor	Brazil	Flamengo	1	1981	
Cantarele	Brazil	Flamengo	1	1981	
Peu	Brazil	Flamengo	1	1981	
Luiz Fumanchu	Brazil	Flamengo	1	1981	
Carlos Alberto	Brazil	Flamengo	1	1981	
Rondinelli	Brazil	Flamengo	1	1981	
Chiquinho Carioca	Brazil	Flamengo	1	1981	
Reinaldo	Brazil	Flamengo	1	1981	
Gustavo Fernández	Uruguay	Peñarol	1	1982	
Víctor Diogo	Uruguay	Peñarol	1	1982	
Walter Olivera	Uruguay	Peñarol	1	1982	Captain in 1982
Nelson Gutiérrez	Uruguay	Peñarol, River Plate	2	1982, 1986	
Juan V. Morales	Uruguay	Peñarol	1	1982	
Mario Saralegui	Uruguay	Peñarol	1	1982	
Miguel Bossio	Uruguay	Peñarol	1	1982	
Jair	Brazil	Peñarol	1	1982	
Ernesto Vargas	Uruguay	Peñarol	1	1982	
Fernando Morena	Uruguay	Peñarol	1	1982	
Walkir Silva	Uruguay	Peñarol	1	1982	
Daniel Rodríguez	Uruguay	Peñarol	1	1982	
Venancio Ramos	Uruguay	Peñarol	1	1982	
Domingo Cáceres	Uruguay	Peñarol	1	1982	
Nelson Marcenaro	Uruguay	Peñarol	1	1982	
Mazarópi	Brazil	Grêmio	1	1983	
Remi	Brazil	Grêmio	1	1983	
Silmar	Brazil	Grêmio	1	1983	
Leandro José	Brazil	Grêmio	1	1983	
Baidek	Brazil	Grêmio	1	1983	
Paulo Roberto	Brazil	Grêmio	1	1983	
Casemiro	Brazil	Grêmio	1	1983	
China	Brazil	Grêmio	1	1983	
Osvaldo	Brazil	Grêmio	1	1983	
Renato Gaúcho	Brazil	Grêmio	1	1983	
Caio	Brazil	Grêmio	1	1983	
Tarciso	Brazil	Grêmio	1	1983	
César	Brazil	Grêmio	1	1983	
Tonho	Brazil	Grêmio	1	1983	
Beto	Brazil	Grêmio	1	1983	
Paulo Bonamigo	Brazil	Grêmio	1	1983	
Paulo César	Brazil	Grêmio	1	1983	
Newmar	Brazil	Grêmio	1	1983	
Gérson	Brazil	Grêmio	1	1983	
Jorge Leandro	Brazil	Grêmio	1	1983	
Lambari	Brazil	Grêmio	1	1983	
Guilherme	Brazil	Grêmio	1	1983	
Carlos Goyén	Uruguay	Independiente	1	1984	
Néstor Clausen	Argentina	Independiente	1	1984	
Hugo Villaverde	Argentina	Independiente	1	1984	
Enzo Trossero	Argentina	Independiente	1	1984	Captain in 1984
Carlos Enrique	Argentina	Independiente	1	1984	
Ricardo Giusti	Argentina	Independiente	1	1984	
Claudio Marangoni	Argentina	Independiente	1	1984	
Jorge Burruchaga	Argentina	Independiente	1	1984	
Sergio Buffarini	Argentina	Independiente	1	1984	
Alejandro Barberón	Argentina	Independiente	1	1984	
Pedro Monzón	Argentina	Independiente	1	1984	
Gerardo Reinoso	Argentina	Independiente	1	1984	
René Houseman	Argentina	Independiente	1	1984	
Miguel Oviedo	Argentina	Independiente	1	1984	
Rodolfo Zimmermann	Argentina	Independiente	1	1984	
Enrique Vidallé	Argentina	Argentinos Juniors	1	1985	
Carmelo Villalba	Argentina	Argentinos Juniors	1	1985	
José Luis Pavoni	Argentina	Argentinos Juniors	1	1985	
Jorge Olguín	Argentina	Argentinos Juniors	1	1985	
Adrián Domenech	Argentina	Argentinos Juniors	1	1985	Captain in 1985
Emilio Commisso	Argentina	Argentinos Juniors	1	1985	
Sergio Batista	Argentina	Argentinos Juniors	1	1985	
Mario Videla	Argentina	Argentinos Juniors	1	1985	
José A. Castro	Argentina	Argentinos Juniors	1	1985	
Claudio Borghi	Argentina	Argentinos Juniors	1	1985	
Carlos Ereros	Argentina	Argentinos Juniors	1	1985	
Carlos Morete	Argentina	Argentinos Juniors	1	1985	
Jorge Pellegrini	Argentina	Argentinos Juniors	1	1985	
Armando Dely Valdés	Panama	Argentinos Juniors	1	1985	
Juan José López	Argentina	Argentinos Juniors	1	1985	
Carlos Mayor	Argentina	Argentinos Juniors	1	1985	
Renato Corsi	United States	Argentinos Juniors	1	1985	
Miguel Lemme	Argentina	Argentinos Juniors	1	1985	
Nery Pumpido	Argentina	River Plate	1	1986	
Jorge Gordillo	Argentina	River Plate	1	1986	
Oscar Ruggeri	Argentina	River Plate	1	1986	
Alejandro Montenegro	Argentina	River Plate	1	1986	
Héctor Enrique	Argentina	River Plate	1	1986	
Américo Gallego	Argentina	River Plate	1	1986	Captain in 1986.
Norberto Alonso	Argentina	River Plate	1	1986	
Roque Alfaro	Argentina	River Plate	1	1986	
Antonio Alzamendi	Uruguay	River Plate	1	1986	
Juan Gilberto Funes	Argentina	River Plate	1	1986	
Pedro Troglio	Argentina	River Plate	1	1986	
Daniel Sperandío	Argentina	River Plate	1	1986	
Rubén Darío Gómez	Argentina	River Plate	1	1986	
Patricio Hernández	Argentina	River Plate	1	1986	
Eduardo Pereira	Uruguay	Peñarol	1	1987	Captain in 1987
José Herrera	Uruguay	Peñarol	1	1987	
Marcelo Rotti	Uruguay	Peñarol	1	1987	
Obdulio Trasante	Uruguay	Peñarol	1	1987	
Alfonso Domínguez	Uruguay	Peñarol	1	1987	
Gustavo Matosas	Uruguay	Peñarol	1	1987	
José Perdomo	Uruguay	Peñarol	1	1987	
Ricardo Viera	Uruguay	Peñarol	1	1987	
Daniel Vidal	Uruguay	Peñarol	1	1987	
Diego Aguirre	Uruguay	Peñarol	1	1987	
Jorge Cabrera	Uruguay	Peñarol	1	1987	
Eduardo da Silva	Uruguay	Peñarol	1	1987	
Jorge Villar	Uruguay	Peñarol	1	1987	
Jorge Gonçálvez	Uruguay	Peñarol	1	1987	
Jorge Seré	Uruguay	Nacional	1	1988	
José Pintos Saldanha	Uruguay	Nacional	1	1988	
Daniel Felipe Revelez	Uruguay	Nacional	1	1988	
Carlos Soca	Uruguay	Nacional	1	1988	
Santiago Ostolaza	Uruguay	Nacional	1	1988	
Jorge Cardaccio	Uruguay	Nacional	1	1988	
Yubert Lemos	Uruguay	Nacional	1	1988	
William Castro	Uruguay	Nacional	1	1988	
Ernesto Vargas	Uruguay	Nacional	1	1988	
Juan Carlos de Lima	Uruguay	Nacional	1	1988	
José Daniel Carreño	Uruguay	Nacional	1	1988	
Héctor Morán	Uruguay	Nacional	1	1988	
Tony Gómez	Uruguay	Nacional	1	1988	
Martín Lasarte	Uruguay	Nacional	1	1988	
René Higuita	Colombia	Atlético Nacional	1	1989	
León Villa	Colombia	Atlético Nacional	1	1989	
Luis Carlos Perea	Colombia	Atlético Nacional	1	1989	
Andrés Escobar	Colombia	Atlético Nacional	1	1989	
Gildardo Gómez	Colombia	Atlético Nacional	1	1989	
Leonel Álvarez	Colombia	Atlético Nacional	1	1989	
Alexis García	Colombia	Atlético Nacional	1	1989	Captain in 1989
Felipe Pérez	Colombia	Atlético Nacional	1	1989	
Luis Fajardo	Colombia	Atlético Nacional	1	1989	
Jaime Arango	Colombia	Atlético Nacional	1	1989	
Albeiro Usuriaga	Colombia	Atlético Nacional	1	1989	
John Jairo Carmona	Colombia	Atlético Nacional	1	1989	
Níver Arboleda	Colombia	Atlético Nacional	1	1989	
John Jairo Tréllez	Colombia	Atlético Nacional	1	1989	
José Ricardo Pérez	Colombia	Atlético Nacional	1	1989	
Geovanis Cassiani	Colombia	Atlético Nacional	1	1989	
Luis Fernando Suárez	Colombia	Atlético Nacional	1	1989	
Juan Zacarías Ramírez	Paraguay	Olimpia	1	1990	
Remigio Fernández	Paraguay	Olimpia	1	1990	
Mario César Ramírez	Paraguay	Olimpia	1	1990	
Silvio Suárez	Paraguay	Olimpia	1	1990	
Fermín Balbuena	Paraguay	Olimpia	1	1990	
Luis Alberto Monzón	Paraguay	Olimpia	1	1990	
Gabriel González	Paraguay	Olimpia	1	1990	
Adriano Samaniego	Paraguay	Olimpia	1	1990	
Raúl Amarilla	Paraguay	Olimpia	1	1990	
Cristóbal Cubilla	Paraguay	Olimpia	1	1990	
Adolfo Jara	Paraguay	Olimpia	1	1990	
Vidal Sanabria	Paraguay	Olimpia	1	1990	
Herib Chamas	Paraguay	Olimpia	1	1990	
Nery Franco	Paraguay	Olimpia	1	1990	
Carlos Guirland	Paraguay	Olimpia	1	1990	
Celso Ayala	Paraguay	Olimpia, River Plate	2	1990; 1996	
Julián Coronel	Paraguay	Olimpia	1	1990	
Virginio Cáceres	Paraguay	Olimpia	2	1990; 2002	
Daniel Morón	Argentina	Colo-Colo	1	1991	
Lizardo Garrido	Chile	Colo-Colo	1	1991	
Miguel Ramírez	Chile	Colo-Colo	1	1991	
Javier Margas	Chile	Colo-Colo	1	1991	
Eduardo Vilches	Chile	Colo-Colo	1	1991	
Rubén Espinoza	Chile	Colo-Colo	1	1991	
Gabriel Mendoza	Chile	Colo-Colo	1	1991	
Juan Carlos Peralta	Chile	Colo-Colo	1	1991	
Jaime Pizarro	Chile	Colo-Colo	1	1991	Captain in 1991
Marcelo Barticciotto	Argentina	Colo-Colo	1	1991	
Rubén Martínez	Chile	Colo-Colo	1	1991	
Luis Pérez	Chile	Colo-Colo	1	1991	
Marcelo Ramírez	Chile	Colo-Colo	1	1991	
Raúl Ormeño	Chile	Colo-Colo	1	1991	
José Letelier	Chile	Colo-Colo	1	1991	
Ricardo Dabrowski	Argentina	Colo-Colo	1	1991	
Leonel Herrera	Chile	Colo-Colo	1	1991	
Sergio Verdirame	Argentina	Colo-Colo	1	1991	
Patricio Yáñez	Chile	Colo-Colo	1	1991	
Zetti	Brazil	São Paulo	2	1992, 1993	
Cafu	Brazil	São Paulo	2	1992, 1993	
Antônio Carlos	Brazil	São Paulo	1	1992	
Ronaldão	Brazil	São Paulo	2	1992, 1993	
Ivan	Brazil	São Paulo	1	1992	
Adílson	Brazil	São Paulo	2	1992, 1993	
Pintado	Brazil	São Paulo	2	1992, 1993	
Raí	Brazil	São Paulo	2	1992, 1993	Captain in 1992 and 1993.
Müller	Brazil	São Paulo	2	1992, 1993	
Nelsinho	Brazil	São Paulo	1	1992	
Palhinha	Brazil	São Paulo, Cruzeiro	3	1992, 1993; 1997	Top Scorer in 1992.
Macedo	Brazil	São Paulo	1	1992	
Elivélton	Brazil	São Paulo, Cruzeiro	3	1992, 1993; 1997	
Ronaldo Luiz	Brazil	São Paulo, Vasco da Gama	3	1992, 1993; 1998	
Catê	Brazil	São Paulo	2	1992, 1993	
Alexandre	Brazil	São Paulo	1	1992	Posthumous award
Rinaldo	Brazil	São Paulo	1	1992	
Sídnei	Brazil	São Paulo	1	1992	
Suélio	Brazil	São Paulo	2	1992, 1993	
Eraldo	Brazil	São Paulo	1	1992	
Marcos	Brazil	São Paulo	1	1992	
Mona	Brazil	São Paulo	1	1992	
Menta	Brazil	São Paulo	1	1992	
Cláudio Moura	Brazil	São Paulo	2	1992, 1993	
Gilmar Estevam	Brazil	São Paulo	1	1992	
Vítor	Brazil	São Paulo, Cruzeiro, Vasco da Gama	3	1993; 1997; 1998	
Válber	Brazil	São Paulo, Vasco da Gama	2	1993; 1998	
Gilmar	Brazil	São Paulo	1	1993	
Toninho Cerezo	Brazil	São Paulo	1	1993	
André Luiz	Brazil	São Paulo	1	1993	
Dinho	Brazil	São Paulo, Grêmio	2	1993; 1995	
Jamelli	Brazil	São Paulo	1	1993	
Marcos Adriano	Brazil	São Paulo	1	1993	
Juninho	Brazil	São Paulo	1	1993	
Lula	Brazil	São Paulo	1	1993	
Vaguinho	Brazil	São Paulo	1	1993	
Rogério Ceni	Brazil	São Paulo	2	1993, 2005	Captain in 2005.
Guilherme	Brazil	São Paulo	1	1993	
Gilberto	Brazil	São Paulo	1	1993	
José Luis Chilavert	Paraguay	Vélez Sarsfield	1	1994	
Flavio Zandoná	Argentina	Vélez Sarsfield	1	1994	
Roberto Trotta	Argentina	Vélez Sarsfield	1	1994	Captain in 1994
Víctor Sotomayor	Argentina	Vélez Sarsfield	1	1994	
Raúl Cardozo	Argentina	Vélez Sarsfield	1	1994	
Christian Bassedas	Argentina	Vélez Sarsfield	1	1994	
Marcelo Gómez	Argentina	Vélez Sarsfield	1	1994	
José Basualdo	Argentina	Vélez Sarsfield, Boca Juniors	2	1994; 2000	
Roberto Pompei	Argentina	Vélez Sarsfield	1	1994	
Omar Asad	Argentina	Vélez Sarsfield	1	1994	
José Oscar Flores	Argentina	Vélez Sarsfield	1	1994	
Fabián Fernández	Argentina	Vélez Sarsfield	1	1994	
Claudio Husaín	Argentina	Vélez Sarsfield	1	1994	
Héctor Almandoz	Argentina	Vélez Sarsfield	1	1994	
Mauricio Pellegrino	Argentina	Vélez Sarsfield	1	1994	
Danrlei	Brazil	Grêmio	1	1995	
Francisco Arce	Paraguay	Grêmio, Palmeiras	2	1995; 1999	
Catalino Rivarola	Paraguay	Grêmio, Palmeiras	2	1995; 1999	
Adílson Batista	Brazil	Grêmio	1	1995	Captain in 1995.
Roger	Brazil	Grêmio	1	1995	
Luís Carlos Goiano	Brazil	Grêmio	1	1995	
Arílson	Brazil	Grêmio	1	1995	
Carlos Miguel	Brazil	Grêmio	1	1995	
Paulo Nunes	Brazil	Grêmio, Palmeiras	2	1995; 1999	
Mário Jardel	Brazil	Grêmio	1	1995	Top Scorer in 1995.
Luciano Dias	Brazil	Grêmio	1	1995	
Nildo	Brazil	Grêmio	1	1995	
Alexandre Gaúcho	Brazil	Grêmio	1	1995	
Magno	Brazil	Grêmio	1	1995	
Emerson	Brazil	Grêmio	1	1995	
Murilo Engelmann	Brazil	Grêmio	1	1995	
Vagner Mancini	Brazil	Grêmio	1	1995	
Wagner Fernandes	Brazil	Grêmio	1	1995	
André Vieira	Brazil	Grêmio	1	1995	
Carlos Alberto	Brazil	Grêmio	1	1995	
Carlão	Brazil	Grêmio	1	1995	
Dega	Brazil	Grêmio	1	1995	
Jé	Brazil	Grêmio	1	1995	
Scheidt	Brazil	Grêmio	1	1995	
Carlinhos	Brazil	Grêmio	1	1995	
Jacques	Brazil	Grêmio	1	1995	
Germán Burgos	Argentina	River Plate	1	1996	
Hernán Díaz	Argentina	River Plate	1	1996	
Guillermo Rivarola	Argentina	River Plate	1	1996	
Ricardo Altamirano	Argentina	River Plate	1	1996	
Marcelo Escudero	Argentina	River Plate	1	1996	
Matías Almeyda	Argentina	River Plate	1	1996	
Gabriel Cedrés	Uruguay	River Plate	1	1996	
Ariel Ortega	Argentina	River Plate	1	1996	
Hernán Crespo	Argentina	River Plate	1	1996	
Enzo Francescoli	Uruguay	River Plate	1	1996	
Juan Gómez	Argentina	River Plate	1	1996	
Marcelo Gallardo	Argentina	River Plate	1	1996	
Alejandro Saccone	Argentina	River Plate	1	1996	
Juan Pablo Sorín	Argentina	River Plate	1	1996	
Gabriel Amato	Argentina	River Plate	1	1996	
Ramón Medina Bello	Argentina	River Plate	1	1996	
Ernesto Corti	Argentina	River Plate	1	1996	
Pablo Lavallén	Argentina	River Plate	1	1996	
Gustavo Lombardi	Argentina	River Plate	1	1996	
Facundo Villalba	Argentina	River Plate	1	1996	
Santiago Solari	Argentina	River Plate	1	1996	
Leonardo Astrada	Argentina	River Plate	1	1996	
Dida	Brazil	Cruzeiro	1	1997	
Gélson Baresi	Brazil	Cruzeiro	1	1997	
João Carlos	Brazil	Cruzeiro	1	1997	
Wilson Gottardo	Brazil	Cruzeiro	1	1997	
Nonato	Brazil	Cruzeiro	1	1997	
Donizete Amorim	Brazil	Cruzeiro	1	1997	
Donizete Oliveira	Brazil	Cruzeiro	1	1997	
Fabinho	Brazil	Cruzeiro	1	1997	
Ricardinho	Brazil	Cruzeiro	1	1997	
Marcelo Ramos	Brazil	Cruzeiro	1	1997	
Da Silva	Brazil	Cruzeiro	1	1997	
Tico	Brazil	Cruzeiro	1	1997	
Célio Lúcio	Brazil	Cruzeiro	1	1997	
Rogério	Brazil	Cruzeiro	1	1997	
Reinaldo Rosa	Brazil	Cruzeiro	1	1997	
Cleisson	Brazil	Cruzeiro	1	1997	
Aílton	Brazil	Cruzeiro	1	1997	
Alex Mineiro	Brazil	Cruzeiro	1	1997	
Harlei	Brazil	Cruzeiro	1	1997	
Jean	Brazil	Cruzeiro	1	1997	
Fabiano Eller	Brazil	Vasco da Gama, Internacional	3	1998; 2006, 2010	
Carlos Germano	Brazil	Vasco da Gama	1	1998	
Maricá	Brazil	Vasco da Gama	1	1998	
Odvan	Brazil	Vasco da Gama	1	1998	
Mauro Galvão	Brazil	Vasco da Gama	1	1998	Captain in 1998.
Luisinho	Brazil	Vasco da Gama	1	1998	
Felipe	Brazil	Vasco da Gama	1	1998	
Donizete	Brazil	Vasco da Gama	1	1998	
Nasa	Brazil	Vasco da Gama	1	1998	
Pedrinho	Brazil	Vasco da Gama	1	1998	
Luizão	Brazil	Vasco da Gama, São Paulo	2	1998; 2005	Top Scorer in 2000.
Vágner	Brazil	Vasco da Gama	1	1998	
Ramon	Brazil	Vasco da Gama	1	1998	
Juninho	Brazil	Vasco da Gama	1	1998	
Márcio	Brazil	Vasco da Gama	1	1998	
Alex	Brazil	Vasco da Gama	1	1998	
Mauricinho	Brazil	Vasco da Gama	1	1998	
Sorato	Brazil	Vasco da Gama	1	1998	
Filipe Alvim	Brazil	Vasco da Gama	1	1998	
Fabrício Carvalho	Brazil	Vasco da Gama	1	1998	
Fabrício Eduardo	Brazil	Vasco da Gama	1	1998	
Géder	Brazil	Vasco da Gama	1	1998	
Caetano	Brazil	Vasco da Gama	1	1998	
Richardson	Brazil	Vasco da Gama	1	1998	
Nélson	Brazil	Vasco da Gama	1	1998	
Henrique	Brazil	Vasco da Gama	1	1998	
Marcos	Brazil	Palmeiras	1	1999	
Velloso	Brazil	Palmeiras	1	1999	
Júnior Baiano	Brazil	Palmeiras	1	1999	
Roque Júnior	Brazil	Palmeiras	1	1999	
Júnior	Brazil	Palmeiras, São Paulo	2	1999; 2005	
César Sampaio	Brazil	Palmeiras	1	1999	Captain in 1999.
Oséas	Brazil	Palmeiras	1	1999	
Alex	Brazil	Palmeiras	1	1999	
Zinho	Brazil	Palmeiras	1	1999	
Rogério	Brazil	Palmeiras	1	1999	
Euller	Brazil	Palmeiras	1	1999	
Sérgio	Brazil	Palmeiras	1	1999	
Galeano	Brazil	Palmeiras	1	1999	
Rubens Júnior	Brazil	Palmeiras	1	1999	
Jackson	Brazil	Palmeiras	1	1999	
Evair	Brazil	Palmeiras	1	1999	
Cléber	Brazil	Palmeiras	1	1999	
Agnaldo	Brazil	Palmeiras	1	1999	
Edmílson	Brazil	Palmeiras	1	1999	
Juliano	Brazil	Palmeiras	1	1999	
Tiago Silva	Brazil	Palmeiras	1	1999	
Pedrinho	Brazil	Palmeiras	1	1999	
Oscar Córdoba	Colombia	Boca Juniors	2	2000, 2001	
Jorge Bermúdez	Colombia	Boca Juniors	2	2000, 2001	Captain in 2000 and 2001.
Hugo Ibarra	Argentina	Boca Juniors	4	2000, 2001, 2003, 2007	
Walter Samuel	Argentina	Boca Juniors	1	2000	
Rodolfo Arruabarrena	Argentina	Boca Juniors	1	2000	
Cristian Traverso	Argentina	Boca Juniors	2	2000, 2001	
Martín Palermo	Argentina	Boca Juniors	2	2000, 2007	Captain in 2007.
Juan Román Riquelme	Argentina	Boca Juniors	3	2000, 2001, 2007	MVP in 2007.
Guillermo Barros Schelotto	Argentina	Boca Juniors	4	2000, 2001, 2003, 2007	
Roberto Abbondanzieri	Argentina	Boca Juniors, Internacional	4	2000, 2001, 2003; 2010	
Marcelo Delgado	Argentina	Boca Juniors	3	2000, 2001, 2003	Top Scorer in 2003.
Sebastián Battaglia	Argentina	Boca Juniors	4	2000, 2001, 2003, 2007	
Nicolás Burdisso	Argentina	Boca Juniors	1	2000	
Aníbal Matellán	Argentina	Boca Juniors	1	2000	
Gustavo Barros Schelotto	Argentina	Boca Juniors	1	2000	
Fernando Navas	Argentina	Boca Juniors	1	2000	
César La Paglia	Argentina	Boca Juniors	1	2000	
Antonio Barijho	Argentina	Boca Juniors	2	2000, 2001	
Christian Giménez	Argentina	Boca Juniors	2	2000, 2001	
Omar Pérez	Argentina	Boca Juniors	3	2000, 2001, 2003	
Mauricio Serna	Colombia	Boca Juniors	2	2000, 2001	
Clemente Rodríguez	Argentina	Boca Juniors	3	2001, 2003, 2007	
Javier Villarreal	Argentina	Boca Juniors	1	2001	
Walter Gaitán	Argentina	Boca Juniors	1	2001	
Julio Marchant	Argentina	Boca Juniors	1	2001	
José Pereda	Peru	Boca Juniors	1	2001	
Gustavo Pinto	Argentina	Boca Juniors	1	2001	
Ricardo Tavarelli	Paraguay	Olimpia	1	2002	
Néstor Isasi	Paraguay	Olimpia	1	2002	
Nelson Zelaya	Paraguay	Olimpia	1	2002	
Henrique da Silva	Brazil	Olimpia	1	2002	
Julio César Cáceres	Paraguay	Olimpia	1	2002	
Gastón Córdoba	Argentina	Olimpia	1	2002	
Juan Carlos Franco	Paraguay	Olimpia	1	2002	
Sergio Órteman	Uruguay	Olimpia	1	2002	
Richart Báez	Paraguay	Olimpia	1	2002	
Miguel Benítez	Paraguay	Olimpia	1	2002	
Danilo Aceval	Paraguay	Olimpia	1	2002	
Mauro Caballero	Paraguay	Olimpia	1	2002	
Francisco Esteche	Paraguay	Olimpia	1	2002	
Carlos Estigarribia	Paraguay	Olimpia	1	2002	
Hernán Rodrigo López	Uruguay	Olimpia	1	2002	
Pedro Benítez	Paraguay	Olimpia	1	2002	
Victor Quintana	Paraguay	Olimpia	1	2002	
Rolando Schiavi	Argentina	Boca Juniors, Estudiantes	2	2003; 2009	
Diego Crosa	Argentina	Boca Juniors	1	2003	
Ezequiel González	Argentina	Boca Juniors	1	2003	
José María Calvo	Argentina	Boca Juniors	1	2003	
Carlos Tevez	Argentina	Boca Juniors	1	2003	MVP in 2003.
Diego Cagna	Argentina	Boca Juniors	1	2003	Captain in 2003.
Juan Carlos Henao	Colombia	Once Caldas	1	2004	
Miguel Rojas	Colombia	Once Caldas	1	2004	
Samuel Vanegas	Colombia	Once Caldas	1	2004	Captain in 2004.
Édgar Cataño	Colombia	Once Caldas	1	2004	
Edwin García	Colombia	Once Caldas	1	2004	
Jhon Viáfara	Colombia	Once Caldas	1	2004	
Rubén Velázquez	Colombia	Once Caldas	1	2004	
Diego Arango	Colombia	Once Caldas	1	2004	
Elkin Soto	Colombia	Once Caldas	1	2004	
Arnulfo Valentierra	Colombia	Once Caldas	1	2004	
Jorge Agudelo	Colombia	Once Caldas	1	2004	
Juan Carlos González	Colombia	Once Caldas	1	2004	
Jefrey Díaz	Colombia	Once Caldas	1	2004	
Jonathan Fabbro	Paraguay	Once Caldas	1	2004	
Alexis Henríquez	Colombia	Once Caldas, Atlético Nacional	2	2004; 2016	Captain in 2016
Herly Alcázar	Colombia	Once Caldas	1	2004	
Raúl Marín	Colombia	Once Caldas	1	2004	
Javier Araújo	Colombia	Once Caldas	1	2004	
Dayro Moreno	Colombia	Once Caldas	1	2004	
Wilmer Ortegón	Colombia	Once Caldas	1	2004	
Sergio Galván Rey	Argentina	Once Caldas	1	2004	
Edwin Móvil	Colombia	Once Caldas	1	2004	
Cicinho	Brazil	São Paulo	1	2005	
Fabão	Brazil	São Paulo	1	2005	
Edcarlos	Brazil	São Paulo	1	2005	
Diego Lugano	Uruguay	São Paulo	1	2005	
Mineiro	Brazil	São Paulo	1	2005	
Josué	Brazil	São Paulo, Atlético Mineiro	2	2005; 2013	
Danilo	Brazil	São Paulo, Corinthians	2	2005; 2012	
Grafite	Brazil	São Paulo	1	2005	
Amoroso	Brazil	São Paulo	1	2005	
Roger	Brazil	São Paulo	1	2005	
Fábio Santos	Brazil	São Paulo, Corinthians	2	2005; 2012	
Alê	Brazil	São Paulo	1	2005	
Renan	Brazil	São Paulo	1	2005	
Diego Tardelli	Brazil	São Paulo, Atlético Mineiro	2	2005; 2013	
Marco Antônio	Brazil	São Paulo	1	2005	
Souza	Brazil	São Paulo	1	2005	
Alex Bruno	Brazil	São Paulo	1	2005	
Flávio Donizete	Brazil	São Paulo	1	2005	
Daniel Rossi	Brazil	São Paulo	1	2005	
Jean Carlos	Brazil	São Paulo	1	2005	
Michel	Brazil	São Paulo	1	2005	
Falcão	Brazil	São Paulo	1	2005	
Vélber	Brazil	São Paulo	1	2005	
Clemer	Brazil	Internacional	1	2006	
Élder Granja	Brazil	Internacional	1	2006	
Bolívar	Brazil	Internacional	2	2006, 2010	Captain in 2010.
Fabinho	Brazil	Internacional	1	2006	
Rubens Cardoso	Brazil	Internacional	1	2006	
Edinho	Brazil	Internacional	1	2006	
Tinga	Brazil	Internacional	2	2006, 2010	
Fernandão	Brazil	Internacional	1	2006	Captain in 2006; Top Scorer in 2006.
Iarley	Brazil	Internacional	1	2006	
Rafael Sóbis	Brazil	Internacional	2	2006, 2010	
Índio	Brazil	Internacional	2	2006, 2010	
Perdigão	Brazil	Internacional	1	2006	
Ceará	Brazil	Internacional	1	2006	
Wason Rentería	Colombia	Internacional	1	2006	
Márcio Mossoró	Brazil	Internacional	1	2006	
Renan	Brazil	Internacional	2	2006, 2010	
Ediglê	Brazil	Internacional	1	2006	
Michel	Brazil	Internacional	1	2006	
Jorge Wagner	Brazil	Internacional	1	2006	
Adriano Gabiru	Brazil	Internacional	1	2006	
Marcelo Boeck	Brazil	Internacional	1	2006	
Wellington Monteiro	Brazil	Internacional	1	2006	
Alex	Brazil	Internacional, Corinthians	2	2006; 2012	
Claudio Morel Rodríguez	Paraguay	Boca Juniors	1	2007	
Cata Díaz	Argentina	Boca Juniors	1	2007	
Pablo Ledesma	Argentina	Boca Juniors	1	2007	
Bruno Marioni	Argentina	Boca Juniors	1	2007	
Mauricio Caranta	Argentina	Boca Juniors	1	2007	
Rodrigo Palacio	Argentina	Boca Juniors	1	2007	
Aldo Bobadilla	Paraguay	Boca Juniors	1	2007	
Mauro Boselli	Argentina	Boca Juniors, Estudiantes	2	2007; 2009	Top Scorer in 2009.
Neri Cardozo	Argentina	Boca Juniors	1	2007	
Jesús Dátolo	Argentina	Boca Juniors	1	2007	
Éver Banega	Argentina	Boca Juniors	1	2007	
Pablo Migliore	Argentina	Boca Juniors	1	2007	
Matías Silvestre	Argentina	Boca Juniors	1	2007	
Guillermo Marino	Argentina	Boca Juniors	1	2007	
Jonatan Maidana	Argentina	Boca Juniors, River Plate	3	2007; 2015, 2018	
José Francisco Cevallos	Ecuador	LDU de Quito	1	2008	
Norberto Araujo	Argentina	LDU de Quito	1	2008	
Renán Calle	Ecuador	LDU de Quito	1	2008	
Paúl Ambrosi	Ecuador	LDU de Quito	1	2008	
Alfonso Obregón	Ecuador	LDU de Quito	1	2008	
Luis Bolaños	Ecuador	LDU de Quito	1	2008	
Patricio Urrutia	Ecuador	LDU de Quito	1	2008	Top Scorer in 2006. Captain in 2008.
Claudio Bieler	Argentina	LDU de Quito	1	2008	
Joffre Guerrón	Ecuador	LDU de Quito	1	2008	MVP in 2008.
Enrique Vera	Paraguay	LDU de Quito	1	2008	
Damián Manso	Argentina	LDU de Quito	1	2008	
Daniel Viteri	Ecuador	LDU de Quito	1	2008	
Agustín Delgado	Ecuador	LDU de Quito	1	2008	Top Scorer in 2006.
Diego Calderón	Ecuador	LDU de Quito	1	2008	
Franklin Salas	Ecuador	LDU de Quito	1	2008	
William Araujo	Ecuador	LDU de Quito	1	2008	
Edder Vaca	Ecuador	LDU de Quito	1	2008	
Byron Camacho	Ecuador	LDU de Quito	1	2008	
Ivan Kaviedes	Ecuador	LDU de Quito	1	2008	
Jairo Campos	Ecuador	LDU de Quito	1	2008	
Andrés Arrunátegui	Ecuador	LDU de Quito	1	2008	
Christian Suárez	Ecuador	LDU de Quito	1	2008	
Pedro Larrea	Ecuador	LDU de Quito	1	2008	
Gabriel Espinosa	Ecuador	LDU de Quito	1	2008	
Jefferson Lara	Ecuador	LDU de Quito	1	2008	
Israel Chango	Ecuador	LDU de Quito	1	2008	
Luis Preti	Ecuador	LDU de Quito	1	2008	
Víctor Estupiñán	Ecuador	LDU de Quito	1	2008	
Mariano Andújar	Argentina	Estudiantes	1	2009	
Marcos Angeleri	Argentina	Estudiantes	1	2009	
Christian Cellay	Argentina	Estudiantes	1	2009	
Leandro Desábato	Argentina	Estudiantes	1	2009	
Germán Ré	Argentina	Estudiantes	1	2009	
Rodrigo Braña	Argentina	Estudiantes	1	2009	
Enzo Pérez	Argentina	Estudiantes, River Plate	2	2009; 2018	
Juan Sebastián Verón	Argentina	Estudiantes	1	2009	Captain in 2009. MVP in 2009.
Leandro Benítez	Argentina	Estudiantes	1	2009	
Gastón Fernández	Argentina	Estudiantes	1	2009	
Damián Albil	Argentina	Estudiantes	1	2009	
Juan Manuel Díaz	Uruguay	Estudiantes	1	2009	
Federico Fernández	Argentina	Estudiantes	1	2009	
Matías Sánchez	Argentina	Estudiantes	1	2009	
Maximiliano Núñez	Argentina	Estudiantes	1	2009	
José Calderón	Argentina	Estudiantes	1	2009	
Juan Salgueiro	Uruguay	Estudiantes	1	2009	
Marcos Rojo	Argentina	Estudiantes	1	2009	
Raúl Iberbia	Argentina	Estudiantes	1	2009	
Agustín Alayes	Argentina	Estudiantes	1	2009	
Juan Augusto Huerta	Argentina	Estudiantes	1	2009	
Lauro	Brazil	Internacional	1	2010	
Pablo Guiñazú	Argentina	Internacional	1	2010	
Kléber	Brazil	Internacional	1	2010	
Taison	Brazil	Internacional	1	2010	
Sandro	Brazil	Internacional	1	2010	
Alecsandro	Brazil	Internacional, Atlético Mineiro	2	2010; 2013	
Andrés D'Alessandro	Argentina	Internacional	1	2010	
Giuliano	Brazil	Internacional	1	2010	MVP in 2010.
Gonzalo Sorondo	Uruguay	Internacional	1	2010	
Nei	Brazil	Internacional	1	2010	
Andrezinho	Brazil	Internacional	1	2010	
Edu	Brazil	Internacional	1	2010	
Muriel	Brazil	Internacional	1	2010	
Bruno Silva	Brazil	Internacional	1	2010	
Danilo Silva	Brazil	Internacional	1	2010	
Glaydson	Brazil	Internacional	1	2010	
Wilson Matias	Brazil	Internacional	1	2010	
Juan Jesus	Brazil	Internacional	1	2010	
Everton Costa	Brazil	Internacional	1	2010	
Leandro Damião	Brazil	Internacional	1	2010	
Rafael	Brazil	Santos	1	2011	
Edu Dracena	Brazil	Santos	1	2011	Captain in 2011.
Léo	Brazil	Santos	1	2011	
Jonathan	Brazil	Santos	1	2011	
Arouca	Brazil	Santos	1	2011	
Durval	Brazil	Santos	1	2011	
Elano	Brazil	Santos	1	2011	
Keirrison	Brazil	Santos	1	2011	
Rodrigo Possebon	Brazil	Santos	1	2011	
Paulo Henrique Ganso	Brazil	Santos, Fluminense	2	2011; 2023	
Neymar	Brazil	Santos	1	2011	MVP in 2011. Top Scorer in 2012.
Bruno Rodrigo	Brazil	Santos, Grêmio	2	2011; 2017	
Adriano	Brazil	Santos	1	2011	
Alex Sandro	Brazil	Santos, Flamengo	2	2011; 2025	
Maikon Leite	Brazil	Santos	1	2011	
Zé Eduardo	Brazil	Santos	1	2011	
Pará	Brazil	Santos	1	2011	
Aranha	Brazil	Santos	1	2011	
Danilo	Brazil	Santos, Flamengo	2	2011; 2025	
Diogo	Brazil	Santos	1	2011	
Felipe Anderson	Brazil	Santos	1	2011	
Alan Patrick	Brazil	Santos	1	2011	
Bruno Aguiar	Brazil	Santos	1	2011	
Jonathan	Brazil	Santos	1	2011	
Júlio César	Brazil	Corinthians	1	2012	
Alessandro	Brazil	Corinthians	1	2012	Captain in 2012.
Chicão	Brazil	Corinthians	1	2012	
Leandro Castán	Brazil	Corinthians	1	2012	
Ralf	Brazil	Corinthians	1	2012	
Willian	Brazil	Corinthians, Palmeiras	3	2012; 2020, 2021	
Paulinho	Brazil	Corinthians	1	2012	
Liédson	Portugal	Corinthians	1	2012	
Marquinhos	Brazil	Corinthians	1	2012	
Emerson Sheik	Qatar	Corinthians	1	2012	MVP in 2012.
Paulo André	Brazil	Corinthians	1	2012	
Luis Ramírez	Peru	Corinthians	1	2012	
Douglas	Brazil	Corinthians	1	2012	
Ramon	Brazil	Corinthians	1	2012	
Élton	Brazil	Corinthians	1	2012	
Romarinho	Brazil	Corinthians	1	2012	
Jorge Henrique	Brazil	Corinthians	1	2012	
Cássio	Brazil	Corinthians	1	2012	
Wallace	Brazil	Corinthians	1	2012	
Willian Arão	Brazil	Corinthians, Flamengo	2	2012; 2019	
Danilo Fernandes	Brazil	Corinthians	1	2012	
Victor	Brazil	Atlético Mineiro	1	2013	
Marcos Rocha	Brazil	Atlético Mineiro, Palmeiras	3	2013; 2020, 2021	
Leonardo Silva	Brazil	Atlético Mineiro	1	2013	
Réver	Brazil	Atlético Mineiro	1	2013	Captain in 2013.
Pierre	Brazil	Atlético Mineiro	1	2013	
Júnior César	Brazil	Atlético Mineiro	1	2013	
Jô	Brazil	Atlético Mineiro	1	2013	Top Scorer in 2013.
Leandro Donizete	Brazil	Atlético Mineiro	1	2013	
Ronaldinho	Brazil	Atlético Mineiro	1	2013	
Bernard	Brazil	Atlético Mineiro	1	2013	
Giovanni	Brazil	Atlético Mineiro	1	2013	
Rafael Marques	Brazil	Atlético Mineiro	1	2013	
Gilberto Silva	Brazil	Atlético Mineiro	1	2013	
Guilherme	Brazil	Atlético Mineiro	1	2013	
Rosinei	Brazil	Atlético Mineiro	1	2013	
Richarlyson	Brazil	Atlético Mineiro	1	2013	
Leleu	Brazil	Atlético Mineiro	1	2013	
Lee	Brazil	Atlético Mineiro	1	2013	
Neto Berola	Brazil	Atlético Mineiro	1	2013	
Carlos César	Brazil	Atlético Mineiro	1	2013	
Luan	Brazil	Atlético Mineiro	1	2013	
Michel	Brazil	Atlético Mineiro	1	2013	
Lucas Cândido	Brazil	Atlético Mineiro	1	2013	
Jemerson	Brazil	Atlético Mineiro	1	2013	
Sebastián Torrico	Argentina	San Lorenzo	1	2014	
Julio Buffarini	Argentina	San Lorenzo	1	2014	
Fabricio Fontanini	Argentina	San Lorenzo	1	2014	
Santiago Gentiletti	Argentina	San Lorenzo	1	2014	
Emmanuel Mas	Argentina	San Lorenzo	1	2014	
Héctor Villalba	Argentina	San Lorenzo	1	2014	
Juan Ignacio Mercier	Argentina	San Lorenzo	1	2014	
Néstor Ortigoza	Paraguay	San Lorenzo	1	2014	
Ignacio Piatti	Argentina	San Lorenzo	1	2014	
Leandro Romagnoli	Argentina	San Lorenzo	1	2014	Captain in 2014
Mauro Matos	Argentina	San Lorenzo	1	2014	
Cristian Álvarez	Argentina	San Lorenzo	1	2014	
Walter Kannemann	Argentina	San Lorenzo, Grêmio	2	2014; 2017	
Gonzalo Prósperi	Argentina	San Lorenzo	1	2014	
Enzo Kalinski	Argentina	San Lorenzo	1	2014	
Pablo Barrientos	Argentina	San Lorenzo	1	2014	
Gonzalo Verón	Argentina	San Lorenzo	1	2014	
Martín Cauteruccio	Uruguay	San Lorenzo	1	2014	
Mauro Cetto	Argentina	San Lorenzo	1	2014	
Carlos Valdés	Colombia	San Lorenzo	1	2014	
Ángel Correa	Argentina	San Lorenzo	1	2014	
Juan Cavallaro	Argentina	San Lorenzo	1	2014	
Facundo Quignon	Argentina	San Lorenzo	1	2014	
Marcelo Barovero	Argentina	River Plate	1	2015	
Gabriel Mercado	Argentina	River Plate	1	2015	
Ramiro Funes Mori	Argentina	River Plate	1	2015	
Leonel Vangioni	Argentina	River Plate	1	2015	
Carlos Sánchez	Uruguay	River Plate	1	2015	
Leonardo Ponzio	Argentina	River Plate	2	2015, 2018	Captain in 2018.
Matías Kranevitter	Argentina	River Plate	1	2015	
Tabaré Viudez	Uruguay	River Plate	1	2015	
Rodrigo Mora	Uruguay	River Plate	2	2015, 2018	
Lucas Alario	Argentina	River Plate	1	2015	
Julio Chiarini	Argentina	River Plate	1	2015	
Éder Álvarez Balanta	Colombia	River Plate	1	2015	
Teófilo Gutiérrez	Colombia	River Plate	1	2015	
Pity Martínez	Argentina	River Plate	2	2015, 2018	MVP in 2018.
Nicolás Bertolo	Argentina	River Plate	1	2015	
Lucho González	Argentina	River Plate	1	2015	
Fernando Cavenaghi	Argentina	River Plate	1	2015	Captain in 2015
Javier Saviola	Argentina	River Plate	1	2015	
Camilo Mayada	Uruguay	River Plate	2	2015, 2018	
Leonardo Pisculichi	Argentina	River Plate	1	2015	
Sebastián Driussi	Argentina	River Plate	1	2015	
Germán Pezzella	Argentina	River Plate	1	2015	
Emanuel Mammana	Argentina	River Plate	1	2015	
Augusto Solari	Argentina	River Plate	1	2015	
Bruno Urribarri	Argentina	River Plate	1	2015	
Franco Armani	Argentina	Atlético Nacional, River Plate	2	2016; 2018	
Daniel Bocanegra	Colombia	Atlético Nacional	1	2016	
Davinson Sánchez	Colombia	Atlético Nacional	1	2016	
Farid Díaz	Colombia	Atlético Nacional	1	2016	
Diego Arias	Colombia	Atlético Nacional	1	2016	
Sebastián Pérez	Colombia	Atlético Nacional	1	2016	
Orlando Berrío	Colombia	Atlético Nacional, Flamengo	2	2016; 2019	
Macnelly Torres	Colombia	Atlético Nacional	1	2016	
Marlos Moreno	Colombia	Atlético Nacional	1	2016	
Miguel Borja	Colombia	Atlético Nacional	1	2016	Top scorer in 2018
Cristian Bonilla	Colombia	Atlético Nacional	1	2016	
Felipe Aguilar	Colombia	Atlético Nacional	1	2016	
Alejandro Guerra	Venezuela	Atlético Nacional	1	2016	
Edwin Velasco	Colombia	Atlético Nacional	1	2016	
Andrés Ibargüen	Colombia	Atlético Nacional	1	2016	
Elkin Blanco	Colombia	Atlético Nacional	1	2016	
Ezequiel Rescaldani	Argentina	Atlético Nacional	1	2016	
Alexander Mejía	Colombia	Atlético Nacional	1	2016	
Luis Enrique Martínez	Colombia	Atlético Nacional	1	2016	
Cristian Dájome	Colombia	Atlético Nacional	1	2016	
Francisco Nájera	Colombia	Atlético Nacional	1	2016	
Gilberto García	Colombia	Atlético Nacional	1	2016	
Mateus Uribe	Colombia	Atlético Nacional	1	2016	
Roderick Miller	Panama	Atlético Nacional	1	2016	
Sherman Cárdenas	Colombia	Atlético Nacional	1	2016	
Luis Carlos Ruiz	Colombia	Atlético Nacional	1	2016	
Marcelo Grohe	Brazil	Grêmio	1	2017	
Edílson	Brazil	Grêmio	1	2017	
Pedro Geromel	Brazil	Grêmio	1	2017	Captain in 2017
Bruno Cortez	Brazil	Grêmio	1	2017	
Jailson	Brazil	Grêmio	1	2017	
Arthur	Brazil	Grêmio	1	2017	
Ramiro	Brazil	Grêmio	1	2017	
Luan	Brazil	Grêmio	1	2017	MVP in 2017.
Fernandinho	Brazil	Grêmio	1	2017	
Lucas Barrios	Paraguay	Grêmio	1	2017	
Paulo Victor	Brazil	Grêmio	1	2017	
Léo Moura	Brazil	Grêmio	1	2017	
Bressan	Brazil	Grêmio	1	2017	
Michel	Brazil	Grêmio	1	2017	
Cícero	Brazil	Grêmio	1	2017	
Jael	Brazil	Grêmio	1	2017	
Everton	Brazil	Grêmio, Flamengo	3	2017; 2022, 2025	
Leonardo Gomes	Brazil	Grêmio	1	2017	
Rafael Thyere	Brazil	Grêmio	1	2017	
Michael Arroyo	Ecuador	Grêmio	1	2017	
Marcelo Oliveira	Brazil	Grêmio	1	2017	
Lucas Martínez Quarta	Argentina	River Plate	1	2018	
Javier Pinola	Argentina	River Plate	1	2018	
Gonzalo Montiel	Argentina	River Plate	1	2018	
Milton Casco	Argentina	River Plate	1	2018	
Exequiel Palacios	Argentina	River Plate	1	2018	
Rafael Santos Borré	Colombia	River Plate	1	2018	
Lucas Pratto	Argentina	River Plate	1	2018	
Germán Lux	Argentina	River Plate	1	2018	
Bruno Zuculini	Argentina	River Plate	1	2018	
Juan Fernando Quintero	Colombia	River Plate	1	2018	
Ignacio Fernández	Argentina	River Plate	1	2018	
Julián Álvarez	Argentina	River Plate	1	2018	
Enrique Bologna	Argentina	River Plate	1	2018	
Luciano Lollo	Argentina	River Plate	1	2018	
Ignacio Scocco	Argentina	River Plate	1	2018	
Nicolás de la Cruz	Uruguay	River Plate, Flamengo	2	2018, 2025	
Santiago Sosa	Argentina	River Plate	1	2018	
Diego Alves	Brazil	Flamengo	2	2019, 2022	
Gabriel Batista	Brazil	Flamengo	1	2019	
César	Brazil	Flamengo	1	2019	
Rodinei	Brazil	Flamengo	2	2019, 2022	
Rodrigo Caio	Brazil	Flamengo	2	2019, 2022	
Pablo Marí	Spain	Flamengo	1	2019	
Renê	Brazil	Flamengo	1	2019	
Rafinha	Brazil	Flamengo	1	2019	
Filipe Luís	Brazil	Flamengo	2	2019, 2022	
Matheus Thuler	Brazil	Flamengo	1	2019	
João Lucas	Brazil	Flamengo	1	2019	
Rhodolfo	Brazil	Flamengo	1	2019	
Matheus Dantas	Brazil	Flamengo	1	2019	
Éverton Ribeiro	Brazil	Flamengo	2	2019, 2022	Captain in 2019 and 2022.
Gerson	Brazil	Flamengo	1	2019	
Diego Ribas	Brazil	Flamengo	2	2019, 2022	
Giorgian de Arrascaeta	Uruguay	Flamengo	3	2019, 2022, 2025	MVP in 2025.
Vinícius Souza	Brazil	Flamengo	1	2019	
Reinier	Brazil	Flamengo	1	2019	
Robert Piris Da Motta	Paraguay	Flamengo	1	2019	
Pepê	Brazil	Flamengo	1	2019	
Gabriel Barbosa	Brazil	Flamengo	2	2019, 2022	MVP in 2021. Top Scorer in 2019 and 2021.
Vitinho	Brazil	Flamengo	1	2019	
Lucas Silva	Brazil	Flamengo	1	2019	
Bruno Henrique	Brazil	Flamengo	3	2019, 2022, 2025	MVP in 2019. Captain in 2025.
Lincoln	Brazil	Flamengo	1	2019	
Miguel Trauco	Peru	Flamengo	1	2019	
Weverton	Brazil	Palmeiras	2	2020, 2021	
Luan	Brazil	Palmeiras	2	2020, 2021	
Gustavo Gómez	Paraguay	Palmeiras	2	2020, 2021	Captain in 2020 and 2021.
Matías Viña	Uruguay	Palmeiras, Flamengo	2	2020; 2025	
Danilo	Brazil	Palmeiras	2	2020, 2021	
Gabriel Menino	Brazil	Palmeiras	2	2020, 2021	
Zé Rafael	Brazil	Palmeiras	2	2020, 2021	
Raphael Veiga	Brazil	Palmeiras	2	2020, 2021	
Rony	Brazil	Palmeiras	2	2020, 2021	
Luiz Adriano	Brazil	Palmeiras	2	2020, 2021	
Jailson	Brazil	Palmeiras	2	2020, 2021	
Emerson Santos	Brazil	Palmeiras	1	2020	
Benjamín Kuscevic	Chile	Palmeiras	2	2020, 2021	
Alan Empereur	Brazil	Palmeiras	1	2020	
Mayke	Brazil	Palmeiras	2	2020, 2021	
Gabriel Silva	Brazil	Palmeiras	1	2020	
Lucas Esteves	Brazil	Palmeiras	1	2020	
Renan	Brazil	Palmeiras	2	2020, 2021	
Felipe Melo	Brazil	Palmeiras, Fluminense	3	2020, 2021; 2023	
Patrick de Paula	Brazil	Palmeiras, Botafogo	3	2020, 2021, 2024	
Gustavo Scarpa	Brazil	Palmeiras	2	2020, 2021	
Lucas Lima	Brazil	Palmeiras	1	2020	
Breno Lopes	Brazil	Palmeiras	2	2020, 2021	
Wesley	Brazil	Palmeiras	2	2020, 2021	
Gabriel Veron	Brazil	Palmeiras	2	2020, 2021	
Vinícius Silvestre	Brazil	Palmeiras	2	2020, 2021	
Vanderlan	Brazil	Palmeiras	2	2020, 2021	
Dudu	Brazil	Palmeiras	1	2021	
Joaquín Piquerez	Uruguay	Palmeiras	1	2021	
Deyverson	Brazil	Palmeiras	1	2021	
Victor Luis	Brazil	Palmeiras	1	2021	
Jorge	Brazil	Palmeiras	1	2021	
Matheus Fernandes	Brazil	Palmeiras	1	2021	
Danilo Barbosa	Brazil	Palmeiras, Botafogo	2	2021, 2024	
Santos	Brazil	Flamengo	1	2022	
Matheus Cunha	Brazil	Flamengo	2	2022, 2025	
Hugo Souza	Brazil	Flamengo	1	2022	
Guillermo Varela	Uruguay	Flamengo	2	2022, 2025	
Léo Pereira	Brazil	Flamengo	2	2022, 2025	
Ayrton Lucas	Brazil	Flamengo	2	2022, 2025	
Fabrício Bruno	Brazil	Flamengo	1	2022	
David Luiz	Brazil	Flamengo	1	2022	
Pablo	Brazil	Flamengo, Botafogo	2	2022; 2024	
Matheuzinho	Brazil	Flamengo	1	2022	
Erick Pulgar	Chile	Flamengo	2	2022, 2025	
Thiago Maia	Brazil	Flamengo	1	2022	
Victor Hugo	Brazil	Flamengo	1	2022	
Arturo Vidal	Chile	Flamengo	1	2022	
João Gomes	Brazil	Flamengo	1	2022	
Matheus França	Brazil	Flamengo	1	2022	
Pedro	Brazil	Flamengo	2	2022, 2025	MVP in 2022. Top Scorer 2022.
Marinho	Brazil	Flamengo	1	2022	MVP in 2020.
Cleiton	Brazil	Flamengo	2	2022, 2025	
Marcos Paulo	Brazil	Flamengo	1	2022	
Kayke David	Brazil	Flamengo	1	2022	
Petterson	Brazil	Flamengo	1	2022	
Mateusão	Brazil	Flamengo	1	2022	
Fábio	Brazil	Fluminense	1	2023	
Samuel Xavier	Brazil	Fluminense	1	2023	
Nino	Brazil	Fluminense	1	2023	Captain in 2023
Marcelo	Brazil	Fluminense	1	2023	
Martinelli	Brazil	Fluminense	1	2023	
André	Brazil	Fluminense	1	2023	
Jhon Arias	Colombia	Fluminense	1	2023	
Keno	Brazil	Fluminense	1	2023	
Germán Cano	Argentina	Fluminense	1	2023	Top Scorer in 2023
Pedro Rangel	Brazil	Fluminense	1	2023	
Marlon	Brazil	Fluminense	1	2023	
Alexsander	Brazil	Fluminense	1	2023	
David Braz	Brazil	Fluminense	1	2023	
Guga	Brazil	Fluminense	1	2023	
Diogo Barbosa	Brazil	Fluminense	1	2023	
Leonardo Fernández	Uruguay	Fluminense	1	2023	
Daniel	Brazil	Fluminense	1	2023	
Thiago Santos	Brazil	Fluminense	1	2023	
Lima	Brazil	Fluminense	1	2023	
John Kennedy	Brazil	Fluminense	1	2023	
Yony González	Colombia	Fluminense	1	2023	
Lelê	Brazil	Fluminense	1	2023	
Manoel	Brazil	Fluminense	1	2023	
Arthur	Brazil	Fluminense	1	2023	
Giovanni	Brazil	Fluminense	1	2023	
Kauã Elias	Brazil	Fluminense	1	2023	
Felipe Andrade	Brazil	Fluminense	1	2023	
Vitor Mendes	Brazil	Fluminense	1	2023	
Lucas Justen	Brazil	Fluminense	1	2023	
John	Brazil	Botafogo	1	2024	
Vitinho	Brazil	Botafogo	1	2024	
Adryelson	Brazil	Botafogo	1	2024	
Alexander Barboza	Argentina	Botafogo	1	2024	
Alex Telles	Brazil	Botafogo	1	2024	
Gregore	Brazil	Botafogo	1	2024	
Marlon Freitas	Brazil	Botafogo	1	2024	Captain in 2024
Luiz Henrique	Brazil	Botafogo	1	2024	
Jefferson Savarino	Venezuela	Botafogo	1	2024	
Thiago Almada	Argentina	Botafogo	1	2024	
Igor Jesus	Brazil	Botafogo	1	2024	
Roberto Fernández	Paraguay	Botafogo	1	2024	
Bastos	Angola	Botafogo	1	2024	
Lucas Halter	Brazil	Botafogo	1	2024	
Mateo Ponte	Uruguay	Botafogo	1	2024	
Tchê Tchê	Brazil	Botafogo	1	2024	
Rafael	Brazil	Botafogo	1	2024	
Tiquinho	Brazil	Botafogo	1	2024	
Júnior Santos	Brazil	Botafogo	1	2024	Top Scorer in 2024
Yarlen	Brazil	Botafogo	1	2024	
Jeffinho	Brazil	Botafogo	1	2024	
Marçal	Brazil	Botafogo	1	2024	
Óscar Romero	Paraguay	Botafogo	1	2024	
Matheus Nascimento	Brazil	Botafogo	1	2024	
Cuiabano	Brazil	Botafogo	1	2024	
Matheus Martins	Brazil	Botafogo	1	2024	
Carlos Eduardo	Brazil	Botafogo	1	2024	
Allan	Brazil	Botafogo	1	2024	
Kayke	Brazil	Botafogo	1	2024	
Kauê	Brazil	Botafogo	1	2024	
Fabiano	Brazil	Botafogo	1	2024	
Raul Steffens	Brazil	Botafogo	1	2024	
Agustín Rossi	Argentina	Flamengo	1	2025	
Dyogo Alves	Brazil	Flamengo	1	2025	
Léo Ortiz	Brazil	Flamengo	1	2025	
Emerson Royal	Brazil	Flamengo	1	2025	
Daniel Sales	Brazil	Flamengo	1	2025	
João Victor	Brazil	Flamengo	1	2025	
Saúl Ñíguez	Spain	Flamengo	1	2025	
Jorge Carrascal	Colombia	Flamengo	1	2025	
Jorginho	Italy	Flamengo	1	2025	
Allan	Brazil	Flamengo	1	2025	
Evertton Araújo	Brazil	Flamengo	1	2025	
João Alves	Brazil	Flamengo	1	2025	
Joshua	Brazil	Flamengo	1	2025	
Luiz Araújo	Brazil	Flamengo	1	2025	
Samuel Lino	Brazil	Flamengo	1	2025	
Juninho	Brazil	Flamengo	1	2025	
Michael	Brazil	Flamengo	1	2025	
Gonzalo Plata	Ecuador	Flamengo	1	2025	
Wallace Yan	Brazil	Flamengo	1	2025	

== See also ==
- Records and statistics of the Copa Libertadores
