= Lloyd Kasten =

American Hispanist, medievalist, lexicographer, and Lusophile (1905–1999)

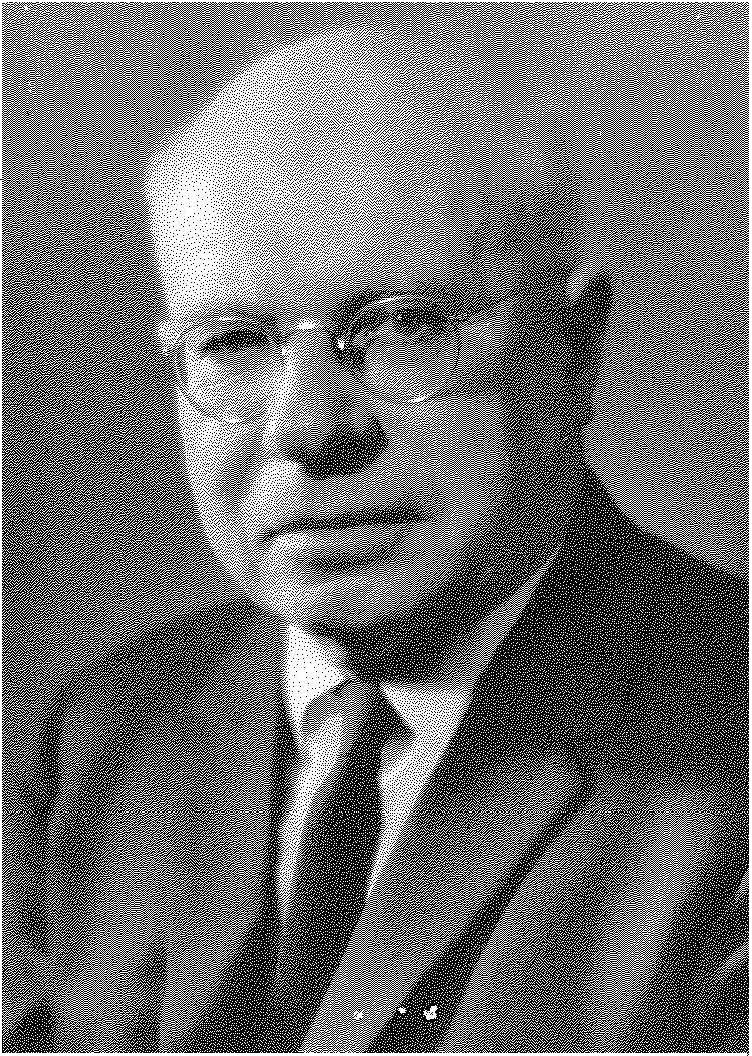
- Born: April 14, 1905; Watertown, Wisconsin, US
- Died: December 13, 1999 (aged 94)

Academic background
- Education: University of Wisconsin; Centro de Estudios Históricos

Academic work
- Discipline: Hispanic studies; medieval studies; lexicography; Lusophone studies
- Notable works: Luso-Brazilian Review

Lloyd August Wilhelm Kasten (April 14, 1905 – December 13, 1999) was an American Hispanist, medievalist, lexicographer, and Lusophile.

Lloyd Kasten joined the faculty of Spanish and Portuguese at the University of Wisconsin in 1931 and spent the next 68 years pursuing and promoting research on the language and literature of medieval Spain. He produced, usually in collaboration with other scholars, editions of several works of medieval Spanish literature, and he led the teams of scholars who compiled the most thoroughly documented dictionary of the Old Spanish language in existence today. In addition, he played a key role in promoting and expanding the study of Portuguese in the United States.

== Early life ==
Kasten was born in 1905 in Watertown, Wisconsin, where his first language was German. In 1926 he received his bachelor's degree at the University of Wisconsin in economics (or "commerce"), but he was already interested in languages, and he continued his studies at Wisconsin for a master's degree in Spanish (1927). After teaching Spanish for a year at the University of Florida, he studied at Spain's Centro de Estudios Históricos, where his teachers included Samuel Gili Gaya, Pedro Salinas, and Dámaso Alonso, and among his classmates were Rafael Lapesa, Américo Castro, and Amado Alonso. He then returned to Wisconsin to pursue a doctorate in the language, which he achieved in 1931. His dissertation, under the mentorship of Antonio García Solalinde, was an edition, glossary, and literary study of a 14th-century Aragonese manuscript of the pseudo-Aristotelian Secretum Secretorum.

== Career ==
Kasten worked with Antonio Solalinde in the Seminary of Medieval Spanish Studies, a research institute founded by Solalinde at the University of Wisconsin in 1931, and in 1937—after Solalinde's death at the age of 45—Kasten assumed the directorship of the Seminary, a role which would last more than 60 years. Prominent among the institute's projects, in addition to the editing of medieval manuscripts, was the compilation of dictionaries: of Old Spanish generally, and of the vocabulary of the works of Alfonso el Sabio in particular. Beginning in the 1970s, and in collaboration with John J. Nitti, he began to enlist the aid of computers to manage the lexical data. In that period also the Seminary began to produce hardbound publications of its editions, under the slightly reconfigured name of Hispanic Seminary of Medieval Studies. His de jure retirement from teaching in 1975 did not interrupt his research activity. The Hispanic Seminary, today located in New York City under the auspices of the Hispanic Society of America, continues its publishing activities and maintains a number of online data bases.

Kasten's interest in Portuguese began in the early 1930s, during a research trip to Europe, when he spent several months in Portugal studying the language. After his return to Wisconsin, he promoted the expansion of Portuguese studies there, and eventually helped to develop a doctoral program in the language which "produced the first major wave of Portuguese professors for American universities". In addition—in collaboration with others—he was instrumental in the founding and editing of the Luso-Brazilian Review, a scholarly journal for Portuguese studies.

Early in his career, Kasten collaborated with Eduardo Neale-Silva to edit reading textbooks for learners of Spanish, and later, with Claude Leroy, he would produce also a reader for students of Portuguese.

Kasten's impact as a mentor in the formation of new "Hispanomedievalists" and others can be seen in the more than 60 doctoral dissertations he directed, including editions of medieval manuscripts and studies of medieval literature, historical linguistics, modern Spanish and Portuguese linguistics, and Luso-Brazilian literature. A complete list of these works is provided by Faulhaber (2002).

== Selected works ==
- Lecturas escogidas, New York: Harper & Brothers (in collaboration with Eduardo Neale-Silva), 1934–1945
- Lecturas modernas, New York: Harper & Brothers (in collaboration with Eduardo Neale-Silva), 1937
- Lecturas amenas, New York: Harper & Brothers (in collaboration with Eduardo Neale-Silva), 1941
- Tentative Dictionary of Old Spanish, Chapel Hill, North Carolina: Mimeo (in collaboration with Hayward Keniston, R. S. Boggs, and H. B. Richardson), 1946
- Veríssimo, Érico (1947), Gato prêto em campo de neve, New York: Holt (edited in collaboration with Claude E. Leroy)
- Seudo-Aristóteles (1957), Poridat de las poridades, Madrid: S. Aguirre (edition)
- Alfonso X (1957–1961), General estoria, Segunda parte, Madrid: CSIC (edited in collaboration with Antonio G. Solalinde and Victor R. B. Oelschläger)
- Alfonso X (1961), Libro de las cruzes, Madrid: CSIC (edited in collaboration with Lawrence B. Kiddle)
- Tentative Dictionary of Medieval Spanish, New York: Hispanic Seminary of Medieval Studies (edited in collaboration with Florian J. Cody), 2001
- Diccionario de la prosa castellana del Rey Alfonso X, New York: Hispanic Seminary of Medieval Studies (edited in collaboration with John J. Nitti), 2002
