= Historical table of the Copa Libertadores =

The Historical table of the Copa Libertadores is a cumulative record of all match results, points and goals of every team that has ever played in the Copa Libertadores since its inception in 1960, up to 2025 season.

The data below does not include the 1948 South American Championship of Champions, as it is not listed by CONMEBOL either as a Copa Libertadores edition or as an official competition. It must be pointed out, however, that at least in the years 1996 and 1997, Conmebol entitled equal status to both Copa Libertadores and the 1948 tournament, in that the 1948 champion club (CR Vasco da Gama) was allowed to participate in Supercopa Libertadores, a CONMEBOL official competition that allowed participation for former Libertadores champions only (for example, not admitting participation for champions of other CONMEBOL official competitions, such as Copa CONMEBOL). The 1948 competition is referred to at the Conmebol website as the competition that, 12 years later, would become the Copa Libertadores.

== Ranking ==
From 1960 to 2026, 67 editions of the Copa Libertadores de América were held. During this period, the clubs rank in the competition is as follow (updated until 2025 Copa Libertadores final):

Pos.	Club	Country	Part.	Titles	Pld	W	D	L	GF	GA	GD	Pts
1	River Plate	Argentina	37	4	373	181	99	93	616	392	+224	642
2	Nacional	Uruguay	48	3	401	170	108	123	559	438	+121	618
3	Peñarol	Uruguay	47	5	369	164	79	126	555	449	+106	571
4	Boca Juniors	Argentina	30	6	308	162	77	69	471	270	+201	563
5	Olimpia	Paraguay	44	3	324	126	94	104	462	411	+51	468
6	Cerro Porteño	Paraguay	42	0	317	116	90	111	405	414	–9	438
7	Palmeiras	Brazil	21	3	210	117	39	54	392	218	+174	390
8	Grêmio	Brazil	21	3	207	108	43	56	318	189	+129	367
9	Colo-Colo	Chile	34	1	241	95	54	92	336	334	+2	339
10	São Paulo	Brazil	21	3	199	96	48	55	307	192	+115	336
11	Bolívar	Bolivia	36	0	245	96	54	95	360	375	–15	342
12	América de Cali	Colombia	21	0	208	91	59	58	299	229	+70	332
13	Universidad Católica	Chile	28	0	230	87	58	85	343	330	+13	319
14	Cruzeiro	Brazil	17	2	166	95	32	39	307	158	+149	317
15	Barcelona	Ecuador	28	0	233	83	58	92	277	289	–12	307
16	Santos	Brazil	16	3	153	83	32	38	287	173	+114	281
17	Universitario	Peru	32	0	225	70	70	85	265	310	–45	280
18	Atlético Nacional	Colombia	22	2	185	78	45	62	250	203	+47	279
19	Flamengo	Brazil	16	2	149	81	32	36	283	171	+112	275
20	Sporting Cristal	Peru	36	0	228	66	58	104	284	363	–79	256
21	Independiente	Argentina	20	7	154	72	39	43	211	143	+68	255
22	Vélez Sarsfield	Argentina	16	1	139	71	33	35	199	127	+72	246
23	Internacional	Brazil	14	2	140	67	39	34	202	124	+78	240
24	Emelec	Ecuador	28	0	213	66	41	106	223	305	–82	239
25	Estudiantes	Argentina	16	4	131	71	23	37	176	115	+61	236
26	Libertad	Paraguay	20	0	162	63	41	58	205	201	+4	230
27	LDU Quito	Ecuador	20	1	161	62	36	63	238	228	+10	222
28	Corinthians	Brazil	15	1	122	64	27	31	211	120	+91	219
29	Deportivo Cali	Colombia	20	0	154	61	32	61	217	206	+11	215
30	Universidad de Chile	Chile	25	0	163	57	37	69	201	239	–38	208
31	The Strongest	Bolivia	27	0	167	57	30	80	203	290	–87	201
32	San Lorenzo	Argentina	17	1	138	50	39	49	167	138	+29	189
33	El Nacional	Ecuador	24	0	146	53	28	65	177	208	–31	187
34	Guaraní	Paraguay	19	0	143	48	37	58	183	200	–17	181
35	Racing	Argentina	11	1	102	49	29	24	162	105	+57	176
36	Atlético Mineiro	Brazil	11	1	103	47	30	26	157	104	+53	171
37	Junior	Colombia	17	0	124	45	28	51	138	158	–20	163
38	América	Mexico	7	0	88	45	17	26	149	97	+52	152
39	Cobreloa	Chile	13	0	105	39	32	34	134	122	+12	149
40	Rosario Central	Argentina	12	0	91	42	22	27	155	119	+36	148
41	Santa Fe	Colombia	13	0	104	39	28	37	138	126	+12	145
42	Alianza Lima	Peru	27	0	168	37	32	99	158	291	-133	143
43	Millonarios	Colombia	18	0	104	38	24	42	140	133	+7	138
44	Jorge Wilstermann	Bolivia	20	0	127	38	24	65	146	247	-101	138
45	Defensor Sporting	Uruguay	16	0	111	32	33	46	110	129	–19	129
46	Deportivo Táchira	Venezuela	24	0	139	31	36	72	129	248	–119	129
47	Unión Española	Chile	13	0	95	33	29	33	115	128	–13	128
48	Vasco da Gama	Brazil	9	1	74	30	23	21	94	76	+18	113
49	Newell's Old Boys	Argentina	8	0	74	28	26	20	86	77	+9	110
50	Caracas	Venezuela	20	0	111	29	23	59	124	197	–73	110
51	Fluminense	Brazil	8	0	66	33	16	17	97	66	+31	115
52	Oriente Petrolero	Bolivia	21	0	118	29	22	67	130	224	–94	109
53	Guadalajara	Mexico	7	0	64	28	15	21	93	76	+17	99
54	Athletico Paranaense	Brazil	7	0	64	29	10	25	91	87	+4	97
55	Independiente Medellín	Colombia	9	0	72	26	16	30	89	89	0	94
56	Lanús	Argentina	6	0	56	22	17	17	75	53	+22	83
57	Deportes Tolima	Colombia	8	0	56	20	20	16	56	54	+2	80
58	Once Caldas	Colombia	8	1	56	18	22	16	65	61	+4	76
59	Independiente del Valle	Ecuador	7	0	48	21	12	15	71	61	+10	75
60	Cruz Azul	Mexico	3	0	44	21	11	12	77	50	+27	74
61	Botafogo	Brazil	5	0	46	21	9	16	64	54	+10	72
62	Deportivo Petare	Venezuela	11	0	70	18	17	35	68	133	–65	71
63	Deportivo Quito	Ecuador	10	0	54	16	16	22	54	80	–26	64
64	Portuguesa	Venezuela	8	0	52	15	17	20	51	71	–20	62
65	Montevideo Wanderers	Uruguay	10	0	51	16	12	23	62	76	–14	60
66	Estudiantes de Mérida	Venezuela	8	0	58	16	10	32	64	104	–40	58
67	Tigres	Mexico	4	0	34	15	12	7	57	41	+16	57
68	Argentinos Juniors	Argentina	4	1	33	16	8	9	40	29	+11	56
69	Palestino	Chile	6	0	44	14	12	18	59	52	+7	54
70	São Caetano	Brazil	3	0	33	13	11	9	46	29	+17	50
71	Atlas	Mexico	3	0	34	13	9	12	58	51	+7	48
72	Blooming	Bolivia	7	0	42	13	9	20	53	72	–19	48
73	Huracán	Argentina	4	0	35	12	11	12	45	41	+4	47
74	Danubio	Uruguay	8	0	46	13	8	25	51	72	–21	47
75	Bella Vista	Uruguay	6	0	40	12	10	18	54	56	–2	46
76	Arsenal de Sarandí	Argentina	4	0	32	14	4	14	41	44	–3	46
77	Pumas UNAM	Mexico	3	0	30	14	3	13	46	37	+9	45
78	Deportivo Cuenca	Ecuador	7	0	43	11	12	20	41	62	–21	45
79	Banfield	Argentina	4	0	28	12	8	8	47	38	+9	44
80	Sol de América	Paraguay	6	0	40	11	11	18	50	68	–18	44
81	Nacional	Paraguay	8	0	46	10	12	24	50	77	–27	42
82	Cienciano	Peru	6	0	36	12	4	20	42	62	–20	40
83	Toluca	Mexico	3	0	22	12	3	7	33	32	+1	39
84	Morelia	Mexico	4	0	26	11	5	10	41	34	+7	38
85	Guarani	Brazil	3	0	24	9	9	6	36	25	+11	36
86	Deportivo Galicia (defunct)	Venezuela	9	0	54	8	10	36	40	101	–61	34
87	Atlético Tucumán	Argentina	3	0	24	10	3	11	26	30	–4	33
88	Godoy Cruz	Argentina	4	0	28	8	9	11	36	46	–10	33
89	Melgar	Peru	6	0	36	10	3	23	29	60	–31	33
90	Minervén	Venezuela	4	0	35	8	9	18	36	81	–45	33
91	San José	Bolivia	8	0	46	9	6	31	40	107	–67	33
92	Juan Aurich	Peru	4	0	28	9	5	14	38	54	–16	32
93	Cúcuta Deportivo	Colombia	2	0	20	8	6	6	28	24	+4	30
94	Santos Laguna	Mexico	2	0	16	8	4	4	24	17	+7	28
95	Santiago Wanderers	Chile	3	0	22	7	7	8	29	34	–5	28
96	O'Higgins	Chile	4	0	28	5	10	13	27	37	–10	25
97	Olmedo	Ecuador	4	0	22	8	1	13	31	44	–13	25
98	Cusco	Peru	4	0	24	7	4	13	18	35	–17	25
99	Universidad de Los Andes	Venezuela	3	0	24	7	4	13	21	41	–20	25
100	Sport Recife	Brazil	2	0	14	7	2	5	18	14	+4	23
101	Bahia	Brazil	3	0	14	6	5	3	18	15	+3	23
102	Monterrey	Mexico	2	0	18	6	5	7	28	26	+2	23
103	Delfín	Ecuador	3	0	18	6	4	8	19	26	–7	22
104	Real Potosí	Bolivia	6	0	24	6	4	14	33	54	–21	22
105	Necaxa	Mexico	2	0	14	6	3	5	16	14	+2	21
106	Audax Italiano	Chile	2	0	14	6	3	5	18	19	–1	21
107	Deportivo Municipal de La Paz	Bolivia	3	0	20	6	3	11	38	47	–9	21
108	Criciúma	Brazil	1	0	10	6	2	2	19	12	+7	20
109	Ferro Carril Oeste	Argentina	2	0	13	6	2	5	12	11	+1	20
110	Universidad San Martín	Peru	3	0	20	6	2	12	19	35	–16	20
111	Unión Huaral	Peru	3	0	20	4	8	8	18	34	–16	20
112	Unión Atlético Maracaibo (defunct)	Venezuela	4	0	25	4	8	13	29	50	–21	20
113	Tijuana	Mexico	1	0	10	5	4	1	13	8	+5	19
114	Progreso	Uruguay	3	0	17	4	7	6	21	20	+1	19
115	Tigre	Argentina	2	0	16	6	1	9	19	31	–12	19
116	Goiás	Brazil	1	0	10	5	3	2	14	5	+9	18
117	Universidad Católica	Ecuador	3	0	16	5	3	8	18	15	+3	18
118	Chiapas (defunct)	Mexico	1	0	12	5	3	4	15	14	+1	18
119	Marítimo (defunct)	Venezuela	5	0	33	2	12	19	23	51	–28	18
120	Paysandu	Brazil	1	0	8	5	2	1	17	9	+8	17
121	Coritiba	Brazil	2	0	12	4	5	3	15	13	+2	17
122	Huachipato	Chile	2	0	12	4	4	4	20	18	+2	16
123	Gimnasia y Esgrima	Argentina	2	0	12	4	4	4	17	17	0	16
124	Deportes Concepción	Chile	2	0	16	4	4	8	18	26	–8	16
125	Deportivo Lara	Venezuela	5	0	22	4	4	14	21	52	–31	16
126	Sport Boys	Peru	6	0	37	3	7	27	28	80	–52	16
127	Defensa y Justicia	Argentina	2	0	14	4	3	7	20	23	-3	15
128	Everton	Chile	2	0	12	4	3	5	14	18	–4	15
129	Atlético Colegiales	Paraguay	2	0	15	3	6	6	22	27	–5	15
130	Deportes Iquique	Chile	2	0	14	4	3	7	19	24	–5	15
131	Universitario de Sucre	Bolivia	3	0	16	3	6	7	13	21	–8	15
132	León	Mexico	2	0	10	3	5	2	15	12	+3	14
133	Paraná	Brazil	1	0	10	4	2	4	14	12	+2	14
134	Pachuca	Mexico	2	0	10	4	2	4	12	15	–3	14
135	América de Quito	Ecuador	2	0	12	4	2	6	13	21	–8	14
136	Mineros de Guayana	Venezuela	5	0	22	3	5	14	15	40	–25	14
137	Defensor Lima	Peru	1	0	10	4	1	5	8	12	–4	13
138	Colón	Argentina	2	0	12	4	1	7	15	21	–6	13
139	San Luis (defunct)	Mexico	3	0	14	3	4	7	14	20	–6	13
140	Sportivo Luqueño	Paraguay	3	0	18	3	4	11	15	30	–15	13
141	Racing	Uruguay	1	0	8	3	3	2	8	7	+1	12
142	Boyacá Chicó	Colombia	2	0	8	4	0	4	12	12	0	12
143	Atlético San Cristóbal (defunct)	Venezuela	1	0	10	3	3	4	10	12	–2	12
144	Cerro	Uruguay	3	0	14	3	3	8	12	23	–11	12
145	12 de Octubre	Paraguay	2	0	12	4	0	8	12	24	–12	12
146	Valdez (defunct)	Ecuador	1	0	8	3	2	3	7	6	+1	11
147	Fénix	Uruguay	2	0	12	3	2	7	16	24	–8	11
148	Cobresal	Chile	2	0	12	2	5	5	10	19	–9	11
149	9 de Octubre	Ecuador	3	0	20	3	2	15	26	56	–30	11
150	Trujillanos	Venezuela	2	0	18	3	2	13	19	50	–31	11
151	Zamora	Venezuela	5	0	30	3	2	25	21	65	–44	11
152	Talleres	Argentina	2	0	10	2	4	4	10	13	–3	10
153	Quilmes	Argentina	2	0	14	2	4	8	17	24	–7	10
154	Valencia (defunct)	Venezuela	3	0	16	2	4	10	16	35	–19	10
155	Pepeganga Margarita (defunct)	Venezuela	1	0	8	3	0	5	4	14	–10	9
156	Santo André	Brazil	1	0	6	2	2	2	11	6	+5	8
157	Deportivo Capiatá	Paraguay	1	0	6	2	2	2	8	7	+1	8
158	Náutico	Brazil	1	0	6	2	2	2	7	8	–1	8
159	Deportivo Portugués (defunct)	Venezuela	1	0	12	2	2	8	8	23	–15	8
160	Universidad de Concepción	Chile	3	0	14	1	5	8	16	33	–17	8
161	Always Ready	Bolivia	2	0	12	2	2	8	10	29	–19	8
162	Unión Magdalena	Colombia	1	0	6	2	1	3	7	8	–1	7
163	Atlético Bucaramanga	Colombia	1	0	8	2	1	5	6	9	–3	7
164	Magallanes	Chile	1	0	6	2	1	3	5	8	–3	7
165	Alfonso Ugarte	Peru	1	0	6	1	4	1	5	8	–3	7
166	Juventude	Brazil	1	0	6	2	1	3	8	12	–4	7
167	River Plate	Uruguay	1	0	8	1	4	3	8	15	–7	7
168	Chapecoense	Brazil	2	0	8	2	1	5	6	14	–8	7
169	Deportivo La Guaira	Venezuela	2	0	10	1	4	5	4	12	–8	7
170	Chaco Petrolero	Bolivia	2	0	12	2	1	9	8	22	–14	7
171	31 de Octubre	Bolivia	1	0	10	2	1	7	12	29	–17	7
172	Guabirá	Bolivia	2	0	12	2	1	9	9	31	–22	7
173	Defensor Arica (defunct)	Peru	1	0	6	1	3	2	5	6	–1	6
174	Paulista	Brazil	1	0	6	1	3	2	4	7	–3	6
175	Espoli	Ecuador	1	0	8	2	0	6	8	15	–7	6
176	Deportivo Anzoátegui	Venezuela	3	0	10	1	3	6	7	20	–13	6
177	Unión San Felipe	Chile	1	0	6	1	2	3	5	8	–3	5
178	León de Huánuco	Peru	1	0	6	1	2	3	4	8	–4	5
179	Unión Deportiva Canarias (defunct)	Venezuela	1	0	6	1	2	3	3	7	–4	5
180	Zulia	Venezuela	1	0	6	1	2	3	4	10	–6	5
181	Técnico Universitario	Ecuador	2	0	12	1	2	9	15	27	–12	5
182	Lara (defunct)	Venezuela	1	0	10	1	2	7	5	17	–12	5
183	Rocha	Uruguay	1	0	6	1	2	3	4	16	–12	5
184	Liverpool	Uruguay	2	0	4	1	1	2	5	9	–4	4
185	UTC	Peru	1	0	6	1	1	4	7	13	–6	4
186	San Agustín	Peru	1	0	6	1	1	4	5	11	–6	4
187	Carabobo	Venezuela	3	0	6	1	1	4	2	12	–10	4
188	Coquimbo Unido	Chile	1	0	8	1	1	6	6	18	–12	4
189	Rangers	Chile	1	0	10	1	1	8	11	27	–16	4
190	La Paz (defunct)	Bolivia	1	0	2	1	0	1	1	2	–1	3
191	Universidad César Vallejo	Peru	4	0	8	0	3	5	2	9	–7	3
192	Atlante	Mexico	1	0	6	1	0	5	8	13	–5	3
193	Cortuluá	Colombia	1	0	6	1	0	5	9	16	–7	3
194	Rentistas	Uruguay	1	0	6	0	3	3	2	9	–7	3
195	Monagas	Venezuela	1	0	6	1	0	5	5	14	–9	3
196	Nacional Táchira (defunct)	Venezuela	1	0	6	1	0	5	6	16	–10	3
197	Binacional	Peru	1	0	6	1	0	5	3	25	–22	3
198	Macará	Ecuador	2	0	4	0	2	2	1	3	–2	2
199	Tacuary	Paraguay	2	0	4	0	2	2	3	8	–5	2
200	Coronel Bolognesi	Peru	1	0	6	0	2	4	0	5	–5	2
201	Bangu	Brazil	1	0	6	0	2	4	6	12	–6	2
202	Unión La Calera	Chile	1	0	6	0	2	4	8	17	–9	2
203	Sport Boys	Bolivia	1	0	6	0	2	4	8	19	–11	2
204	Universitario de La Paz	Bolivia	1	0	6	0	2	4	2	19	–17	2
205	Puebla	Mexico	1	0	2	0	1	1	2	3	–1	1
206	Royal Pari	Bolivia	1	0	2	0	1	1	2	5	–3	1
207	Sport Huancayo	Peru	1	0	2	0	1	1	1	4	–3	1
208	Cerro Largo	Uruguay	1	0	2	0	1	1	2	6	–4	1
209	Filanbanco	Ecuador	1	0	6	0	1	5	5	12	–7	1
210	Deportivo Municipal	Peru	2	0	8	0	1	7	5	15	–10	1
211	Atlético Torino	Peru	1	0	6	0	1	5	4	16	–12	1
212	Atlético Chalaco	Peru	1	0	6	0	1	5	2	14	–12	1
213	Litoral	Bolivia	1	0	6	0	1	5	1	14	–13	1
214	Aurora	Bolivia	2	0	10	0	1	9	5	29	–24	1
215	Tecos	Mexico	1	0	2	0	0	2	1	4	–3	0
216	Ayacucho	Peru	1	0	2	0	0	2	2	8	–6	0
217	Atlético Zulia (defunct)	Venezuela	1	0	4	0	0	4	3	11	–8	0
218	Deportivo Pasto	Colombia	1	0	6	0	0	6	3	14	–11	0
219	Everest	Ecuador	1	0	2	0	0	2	1	14	–13	0
220	Montevideo City Torque	Uruguay	1	0	2	0	2	0	1	1	0	2

Playing at 2022 edition.

=== Individual stats ===
Details	Clubs	Nº
Club with most participations:	(Uruguay) Nacional	48
Club with most titles:	(Argentina) Independiente	7
Club with most games played:	(Uruguay) Nacional	401
Club with most games win:	(Argentina) River Plate	181
Club with most games draw:	(Uruguay) Nacional	108
Club with most games loss:	(Uruguay) Peñarol	126
Club with most goals for:	(Argentina) River Plate	616
Club with most goals against:	(Uruguay) Peñarol	449
Club with most goals difference:	(Argentina) River Plate	+224
Club with most points:	(Argentina) River Plate	642

== By country ==
Top 5 in each country

Argentina

Position	Club	Points
1º	River Plate	642
4º	Boca Juniors	563
21º	Independiente	255
22º	Vélez Sarsfield	246
25º	Estudiantes	233

Bolivia

Position	Club	Points
11º	Bolívar	335
31º	The Strongest	201
44º	Jorge Wilstermann	138
52º	Oriente Petrolero	109
72º	Blooming	48

Brazil

Position	Club	Points
7º	Palmeiras	390
8º	Grêmio	367
10º	São Paulo	336
14º	Cruzeiro	317
16º	Santos	281

Chile

Position	Club	Points
9º	Colo-Colo	339
13º	Universidad Católica	319
30º	Universidad de Chile	208
39º	Cobreloa	149
47º	Unión Española	128

Colombia

Position	Club	Points
12º	América de Cali	332
18º	Atlético Nacional	279
29º	Deportivo Cali	215
37º	Junior Barranquilla	163
41º	Santa Fe	145

Ecuador

Position	Club	Points
15º	Barcelona Guayaquil	299
24º	Emelec	239
27º	LDU Quito	222
33º	El Nacional	187
59º	Independiente del Valle	75

Paraguay

Position	Club	Points
5º	Olimpia	462
6º	Cerro Porteño	438
26º	Libertad	230
34º	Guaraní	181
80º	Sol de América	44

Peru

Position	Club	Points
17º	Universitario	280
20º	Sporting Cristal	256
42º	Alianza Lima	143
82º	Cienciano	40
89º	Juan Aurich	33

Uruguay

Position	Club	Points
2º	Nacional	618
3º	Peñarol	571
45º	Defensor Sporting	129
65º	Montevideo Wanderers	60
74º	Danubio	47

Venezuela

Position	Club	Points
46º	Deportivo Táchira	129
50º	Caracas	110
62º	Deportivo Petare	71
64º	Portuguesa	62
66º	Estudiantes de Mérida	58

- Updated until 2021 Copa Libertadores Final.

== See also ==
- Copa Libertadores records and statistics
- List of Copa Libertadores finals
- List of Copa Libertadores winning managers
- List of Copa Libertadores winning players
