= Roberto César =

Roberto César may refer to:

- Roberto César (footballer, born 1955), Brazilian footballer
- Roberto César (footballer, born 1985), Brazilian footballer
