= Solalinde =

Solalinde is a Spanish surname. Notable people with the surname include:

- Alejandro Solalinde (born 1945), Mexican Catholic priest and human rights champion
- Alicio Solalinde (born 1952), Paraguayan footballer
- Antonio Solalinde (1892–1937), Spanish writer, professor and philologist
- Jesusa Alfau Galván de Solalinde (1895–1943), Spanish-born American novelist, painter and educator
