= 1980 Campeonato Ecuatoriano de Fútbol Serie A =

Campeonato Ecuatoriano de Fútbol
- Season: 1980
- Champions: Barcelona
- Relegated: Deportivo Cuenca; Emelec; LDU Cuenca; Manta
- Copa Libertadores: Barcelona; Técnico Universitario
- Matches: 203
- Goals: 496 (2.44 per match)

The 1980 Campeonato Ecuatoriano de Fútbol de la Serie A was the 22nd national championship for football teams in Ecuador.

== Teams ==
The number of teams for this season was played by 12 teams. Deportivo Quito and LDU Cuenca promoted as winners of First Stage of Serie B.

Club	City
América de Quito	Quito
Barcelona	Guayaquil
Deportivo Cuenca	Cuenca
Deportivo Quito	Quito
El Nacional	Quito
Emelec	Guayaquil
Everest	Guayaquil
LDU Cuenca	Cuenca
LDU Quito	Quito
Manta	Manta
Técnico Universitario	Ambato
Universidad Católica	Quito

== First stage ==
Pos	Team	Pld	W	D	L	GF	GA	GD	Pts	Qualification or relegation
1	Universidad Católica	18	8	5	5	28	21	+7	21	Qualified to the Liguilla Final
2	Técnico Universitario	18	7	6	5	26	21	+5	20	Qualified to the Liguilla Final
3	Barcelona	18	7	6	5	25	21	+4	20	Qualified to the Liguilla Final
4	Emelec	18	7	5	6	22	18	+4	19	
5	América de Quito	18	6	6	6	21	23	−2	18	
6	LDU Quito	18	4	9	5	23	21	+2	17	
7	El Nacional	18	6	5	7	18	19	−1	17	
8	Everest	18	6	5	7	23	29	−6	17	
9	Manta	18	8	1	9	20	28	−8	17	Relegated to the Serie B
10	Deportivo Cuenca	18	5	4	9	14	19	−5	14	Relegated to the Serie B

Source: RSSSF - 1980 Serie A

== Second stage ==
Pos	Team	Pld	W	D	L	GF	GA	GD	Pts	Qualification or relegation
1	El Nacional	18	8	8	2	24	16	+8	24	Qualified to the Liguilla Final
2	Barcelona	18	8	6	4	29	20	+9	22	Qualified to the Liguilla Final
3	América de Quito	18	9	4	5	23	15	+8	22	Qualified to the Liguilla Final
4	Universidad Católica	18	7	7	4	25	13	+12	21	
5	Técnico Universitario	18	7	3	8	29	28	+1	17	
6	LDU Quito	18	4	9	5	21	24	−3	17	
7	Everest	18	4	8	6	22	30	−8	16	
8	Deportivo Quito	18	5	4	9	18	20	−2	14	
9	Emelec	18	4	6	8	13	21	−8	14	Relegated to the Serie B
10	LDU Cuenca	18	5	3	10	7	24	−17	13	Relegated to the Serie B

Source: RSSSF - 1980 Serie A

== Liguilla Final ==
Pos	Team	Pld	W	D	L	GF	GA	GD	Pts	Qualification
1	Barcelona (Note: Barcelona were awarded three points.) (C)	8	4	2	2	12	9	+3	13	1981 Copa Libertadores
2	Técnico Universitario (Note: Técnico Universitario were awarded two points.)	8	5	1	2	11	8	+3	13	1981 Copa Libertadores
3	Universidad Católica (Note: Universidad Católica were awarded three points.)	8	2	4	2	12	9	+3	11	
4	América de Quito (Note: América de Quito were awarded one point.)	8	3	2	3	15	12	+3	9	
5	El Nacional (Note: El Nacional were awarded three points.)	8	0	3	5	4	16	−12	6	

Source: RSSSF - 1980 Serie A
(C) Champions
Notes:

Campeonato Ecuatoriano de Fútbol
1980 champion
