= Reinaldo (footballer, born 1953) =

Brazilian footballer (1953–2024)

Personal information
- Full name: Reinaldo Francisco de Oliveira
- Date of birth: 11 December 1953
- Place of birth: Natal, Brazil
- Date of death: 26 September 2024 (aged 70)
- Place of death: Parnamirim, Brazil
- Position: Forward

Youth career
- Potiguar de Parnamirim

Senior career*
Years	Team	Apps	(Gls)
1973–1975	América de Natal		
1976	ABC		
1976–1979	Santos		
1978–1979	→ Internacional (loan)		
1979	→ Marília (loan)		
1980–1981	Náutico		
1981–1983	Flamengo		
1983	Vila Nova		
1983–1986	ABC		
- * Club domestic league appearances and goals

Reinaldo Francisco de Oliveira (11 December 1953 – 26 September 2024), simply known as Reinaldo, was a Brazilian professional footballer who played as a forward.

== Career ==
Revealed in the youth sector of Potiguar de Parnamirim, Reinaldo became a professional at América de Natal, where he was two-time champion of Potiguar in 1974 and 1975. He was acquired by rival ABC in 1976, becoming champion again, leaving then for Santos. Unable to establish himself, he was loaned to Internacional and Marília, being sold to Náutico at the end of 1979. Reinaldo was also part of the Flamengo squad that won the 1981 Copa Libertadores and Intercontinental Cup.

== Death ==
Reinaldo died of a heart attack, 26 September 2024, at the age of 70.

== Honours ==
América de Natal

- Campeonato Potiguar: 1974, 1975

ABC

- Campeonato Potiguar: 1976, 1983, 1984

Flamengo

- Intercontinental Cup: 1981
- Copa Libertadores: 1981
- Campeonato Brasileiro: 1982
- Campeonato Carioca: 1981
- Taça Guanabara: 1981
