= Menta (footballer) =

Brazilian footballer

Personal information
- Full name: Clementino Fonseca de Aguiar Júnior
- Date of birth: 10 July 1971 (age 55)
- Place of birth: São Paulo, Brazil
- Position: Centre-back

Youth career
- –1991: São Paulo

Senior career*
Years	Team	Apps	(Gls)
1991–1992	São Paulo	3	(0)
1993	Araçatuba		
1999–2000	Figueirense		
2001	Juventus-SP		
2002	CSA		
2005	Taboão da Serra		

Managerial career
- 2010–2011: São Paulo U15
- 2012–2013: São Paulo U17
- 2012–2013: São Paulo U20
- 2018–2019: São Paulo U15
- 2020–2023: São Paulo U17
- 2023–2024: São Paulo U20
- 2024: São Paulo U17
- 2025–: São Paulo Youth (coordinator)
- * Club domestic league appearances and goals as of 27 September 2023

Clementino Fonseca de Aguiar Júnior (born 10 July 1971), better known as Menta, is a Brazilian former professional footballer who played as a centre-back, and a manager who currents works at São Paulo FC youth sectors.

== Playing career ==
Reserve defender for the 1991 and 1992 teams, he had little prominence as a player at São Paulo. He also played for Araçatuba, Figueirense, Juventus, CSA and Taboão da Serra.

== Managerial career ==
Menta coached practically all youth categories of São Paulo FC more than once. He is currently one of coordinators at CFA Cotia.

== Honours ==
=== Player ===
São Paulo

- Campeonato Brasileiro: 1991
- Campeonato Paulista: 1991, 1992
- Copa Libertadores: 1992

=== Manager ===
São Paulo

- Copa do Brasil Sub-17: 2013, 2020
- Copa Ouro Sub-17: 2016, 2017
- U-16 Aspire Tri-Series: 2017
- Salvador Cup: 2016, 2017
- Paulista Cup Sub-16: 2017
- Campeonato Paulista Sub-15: 2018
- Torneio Brasil-Japão Sub-15: 2018
- Dallas Cup U19: 2024
