= Jesusa Alfau Galván de Solalinde =

- Born: Jesusa Alfau Galván; 24 December 1890; Vigo, Galicia, Spain
- Died: 1943 (aged 52–53); Mexico
- Education: University of Wisconsin–Madison
- Occupations: Novelist, painter and educator
- Spouse: Antonio G. Solalinde (1892-1937)
- Parents: Antonio Abad Alfau Baralt (father); Eugenia Galván Velázquez (mother)

Jesusa Alfau Galván de Solalinde (1890–1943) was a Spanish-born novelist, painter and American educator who studied 13th century Spanish textiles.

== Life ==
Jesusa was born in Vigo, Galicia, Spain, 24 December 1895 to Antonio Abad Alfau Baralt and Eugenia Galván Velázquez. Her maternal grandfather, Manuel del Jesús Galván, was famous at the time as the author of the novel Enriquillo. Jesusa attended school in Spain and at the age of 17 she wrote her novel Los débiles (The weak).

Alfau moved to the United States in 1916 and lived for a time in New York, concentrating on her writing career and contributing to the New York weekly newspaper Las Novedades. Throughout her life, she travelled to Spain, the Dominican Republic, the United States and Mexico.

In New York, she met and married Spanish researcher and academic Antonio G. Solalinde (1892-1937) and worked extensively with him to publish research in philology and education. Eventually, they both took teaching positions at the University of Wisconsin in Madison. After his death of a heart attack there on 13 July 1937, Alfau worked with a colleague to complete her late-husband's work, Poemas breves medievales, which was published in 1987.

A 1930 edition of Alfau's novel Los débiles was published by Prentice Hall for adoption as a Spanish-language textbook for students at intermediate to advanced levels.

When Alfau died in Mexico in 1943, she was employed at the University of Wisconsin–Madison and had not yet completed her thesis in English for a Master of Arts degree at the university. Although she did not finish it herself, her thesis about 13th century Spanish textiles was completed and translated into Spanish by her nephew as Nomenclatura de los tejidos españoles del siglo XIII and published in 1969 by the Real Academia de la Lengua Española.

== Selected works ==
Los débiles, signed in 1907 and published in Madrid in 1912.

- Alfau de Solalinde, Jesusa. Los débiles (The weak). Prentice-Hall Incorporated, 1930.
- Alfau de Solalinde, Jesusa. Names of Textiles in Thirteenth Century Spanish. University of Wisconsin–Madison, 1939.
- Alfau de Solalinde, Jesusa. "Nomenclatura de los tejidos españoles del siglo XIII." Anejos del Boletín de la Real Academia Española 19, 1969. (Translated into Spanish by her nephew)
- Alfau de Solalinde, Jesusa. El barroco en la vida de Sor Juana. Instituto de Estudios y Documentos Históricos, Claustro de Sor Juana, 1981.

Jesusa Alfau drawing Millionaire's Row on Fifth Avenue.

== Bibliography ==
- Cocco De Filippis, Daisy (2006). "Alfau Galván de Solalinde, Jesusa (1890-1943)". Latinas in the United States. A Historical Encyclopedia I. Indiana University Press. pp. 37–38. ISBN 0-253-34683-5.
- Marco López, Aurora (2007). Dicionario de Mulleres Galegas [Das orixes a 1975]. Edicións A Nosa Terra. p. 16. ISBN 978-84-8341-146-9.
- Pereira Bueno, Fernando (2004). A presenza das mulleres pintoras na arte galega: 1858-1936. Sada: Ediciós do Castro. ISBN 84-8485-154-0.

== External sources ==
- Solalinde, Antonio García. Poemas breves medievales. No. 39. Hispanic Seminary of, 1987.
