= Silmar =

Brazilian footballer

Personal information
- Full name: Silmar Silva da Silva
- Date of birth: 10 December 1958
- Place of birth: São Borja, Brazil
- Date of death: 28 July 1993 (aged 34)
- Place of death: Gurupi, Brazil
- Position: Right back

Youth career
- São Borja

Senior career*
Years	Team	Apps	(Gls)
1978–1981	São Borja		
1981–1983	Grêmio		
1983	Palmeiras		
1984	Náutico		
1985	Joinville		
1986	Operário-MS		
1987	Próspera		
1988–1989	Ferroviário		
1990	Tiradentes-CE		
1991	Vitória		
- * Club domestic league appearances and goals as of 26 January 2024

Silmar Silva da Silva (10 December 1958 – 28 July 1993), simply known as Silmar, was a Brazilian professional footballer who played as a right back.

== Career ==
Silmar emerged in professional football as a standout for São Borja. He arrived at Grêmio and was part of the winning squad of the 1983 Copa Libertadores. He also played for Palmeiras that year, and later for Náutico and Joinville, being state champion in these years. He ended his career in 1991.

== Honours ==
Grêmio

- Copa Libertadores: 1983

Náutico

- Campeonato Pernambucano: 1984

Joinville

- Campeonato Catarinense: 1985

Ferroviário

- Campeonato Cearense: 1988

== Death ==
Silmar died in a car accident in Gurupi, Tocantins, at age of 34.
