= Marcelo Rotti =

Uruguayan footballer

Personal information
- Full name: Marcelo Gustavo Rotti Vanucci
- Date of birth: 13 June 1963 (age 63)
- Place of birth: Paysandú, Uruguay
- Height: 1.87 m (6 ft 1 1/2 in)
- Position: Defender

Senior career*
Years	Team	Apps	(Gls)
1984–1986	Peñarol		
1986	Platense		
1987–1989	Peñarol		
1989–1990	Tampico Madero		
1990–1991	Barreirense		
1991–1992	Estrela da Amadora		
- * Club domestic league appearances and goals

Marcelo Gustavo Rotti Vanucci (born 13 June 1963) is an Uruguayan former professional footballer who played as a centre-back. During his career, he was a member of the Peñarol team that won the 1987 Copa Libertadores.

== Career ==
He began his career in 1984 with Peñarol and won the Uruguayan championships of 1985 and 1986. In 1986, along with Eliseo Rivero, he had a brief stint with Platense of Argentina, where he played only three games. He returned to Peñarol the following year and, under the direction of Óscar Tabárez, won the 1987 Copa Libertadores against América de Cali. He also played in the 1987 Intercontinental Cup final, in which Peñarol lost to Porto .

== Honours ==
Peñarol

- Copa Libertadores: 1987
