= Chiquinho Carioca =

Brazilian footballer (born 1959)

Personal information
- Full name: Francisco José Marques do Couto
- Date of birth: 11 December 1959 (age 66)
- Place of birth: Niterói, Brazil
- Position: Right winger

Youth career
- Olaria

Senior career*
Years	Team	Apps	(Gls)
1979–1981	Olaria		
1979	→ Fortaleza (loan)		
1981–1983	Flamengo		
1982	→ Sport Recife (loan)		
1983	→ Goytacaz (loan)		
1984–1987	Guarani		
1987–1991	Boavista		
1992–1993	União de Leiria		
1993	Aves		
1994–1995	Feirense		
1995–1996	Vila Real		

Managerial career
- 1997–1999: Cesarense
- 1999–2000: Arrifanense
- 2000: Feirense
- 2001–2002: Paços de Brandão
- 2002–2003: Cucujães
- 2004: Varzim
- 2008: Teresópolis
- 2010: Itaboraí
- 2011–2012: Serra Macaense (U17)
- 2014–2015: São Gonçalo
- * Club domestic league appearances and goals as of 26 January 2024

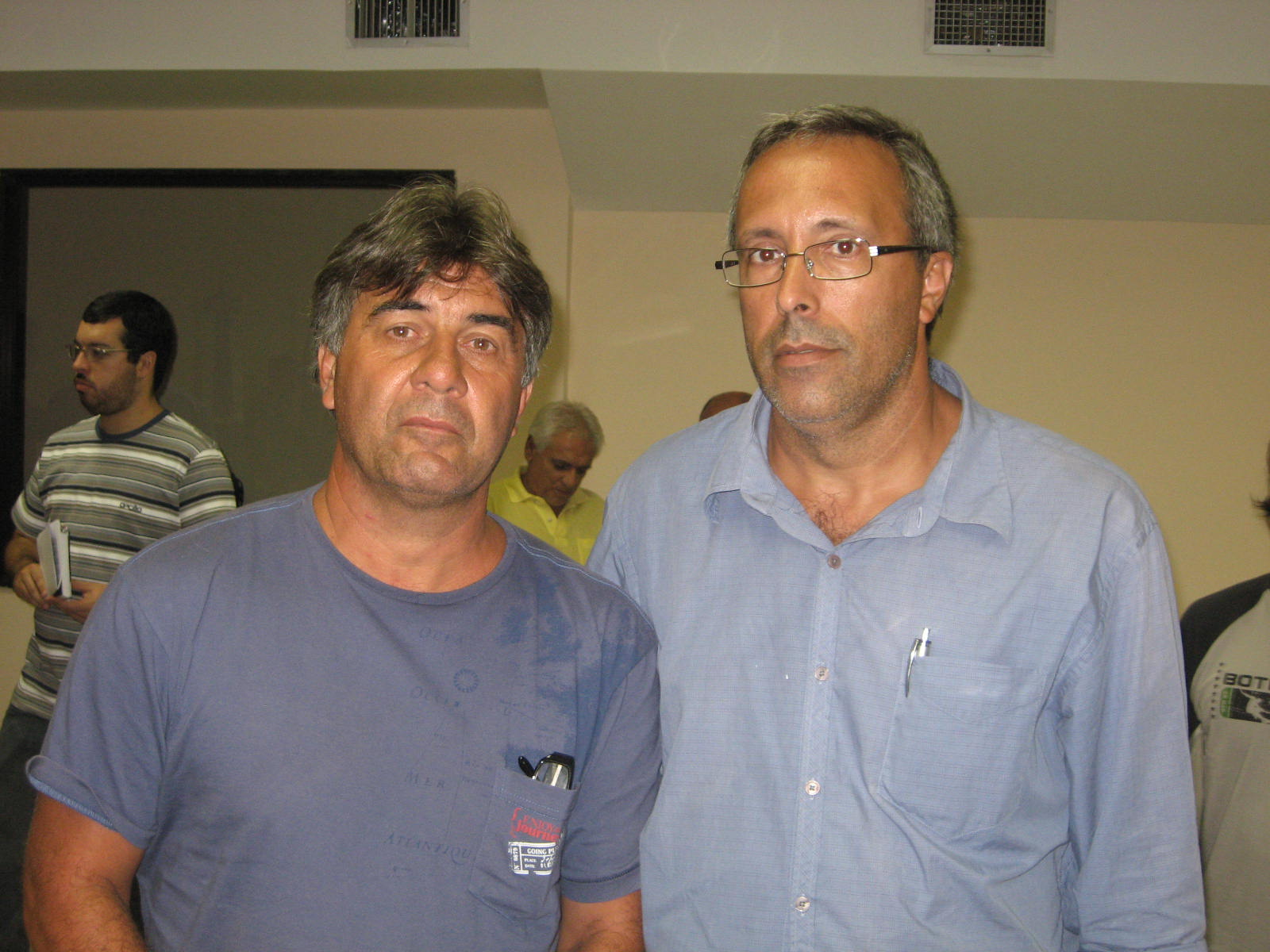
Football coach Chiquinho Carioca and Humberto Ferreira, director of the Itaboraí Sports Association, in 2010.

Francisco José Marques do Couto (born 11 December 1959), better known as Chiquinho Carioca, is a Brazilian former professional footballer and manager who played as a right winger.

== Career ==
Revealed by Olaria, Chiquinho was champion of the first edition of Série C in 1981. In the same year, he transferred to Flamengo where he was champion of the 1981 Copa Libertadores and 1982 Campeonato Brasileiro. He also played for several years at Guarani FC, being runner-up in Brazil in 1986. He played the last years of his player career in Portugal.

== Managerial career ==
He began his management career in Portugal, working for teams such as Cesarense, Feirense and Varzim. In 2008 he returned to Brazil and coached smaller football teams in Rio de Janeiro. His last club was São Gonçalo FC in 2015.

== Honours ==
Olaria

- Campeonato Brasileiro Série C: 1981

Flamengo

- Copa Libertadores: 1981
- Campeonato Brasileiro: 1982
