= 1981 Copa Libertadores =

22nd season of Copa Libertadores

1981 Copa Libertadores de América
Tournament details
- Dates: March 18 – November 23
- Teams: 21 (from 10 associations)

Final positions
- Champions: (Brazil) Flamengo (1st title)
- Runners-up: (Chile) Cobreloa

Tournament statistics
- Matches played: 77
- Goals scored: 221 (2.87 per match)
- Top scorer: (Brazil) Zico (11 goals)

The 1981 Copa Libertadores was won by Flamengo of Brazil, who beat Cobreloa of Chile in the finals, without losing a match in their campaign on the way to win their first title.

== Qualified teams ==
Country	Team	Qualify method
CONMEBOL (1 berth)	Nacional	1980 Copa Libertadores champion
Argentina; 2 berths	Rosario Central	1980 Campeonato Nacional champions
Argentina; 2 berths	River Plate	1980 Campeonato Metropolitano champions
Bolivia; 2 berths	Jorge Wilstermann	1980 Primera División champion
Bolivia; 2 berths	The Strongest	1980 Primera División runner-up
Brazil; 2 berths	Flamengo	1980 Campeonato Brasileiro Série A champion
Brazil; 2 berths	Atlético Mineiro	1980 Campeonato Brasileiro Série A 2nd place
Chile; 2 berths	Cobreloa	1980 Primera División champion
Chile; 2 berths	Universidad de Chile	1980 Liguilla Pre-Copa Libertadores winner
Colombia; 2 berths	Junior	1980 Campeonato Profesional champion
Colombia; 2 berths	Deportivo Cali	1980 Campeonato Profesional runner-up
Ecuador; 2 berths	Barcelona	1980 Campeonato Ecuatoriano de Fútbol Serie A champion
Ecuador; 2 berths	Técnico Universitario	1980 Campeonato Ecuatoriano de Fútbol Serie A runner-up
Paraguay; 2 berths	Olimpia	1980 Primera División champion
Paraguay; 2 berths	Cerro Porteño	1980 Primera División runner-up
Peru; 2 berths	Sporting Cristal	1980 Torneo Descentralizado champion
Peru; 2 berths	Atlético Torino	1980 Torneo Descentralizado runner-up
Uruguay; 2 berths	Peñarol	1980 Liguilla Pre-Libertadores winner
Uruguay; 2 berths	Bella Vista	1980 Liguilla Pre-Libertadores runner-up
Venezuela; 2 berths	Estudiantes de Mérida	1980 Primera División champion
Venezuela; 2 berths	Portuguesa	1980 Primera División runner-up

== Draw ==
The champions and runners-up of each football association were drawn into the same group along with another football association's participating teams. Three clubs from Uruguay competed as Nacional was champion of the 1980 Copa Libertadores. They entered the tournament in the Semifinals.

Group 1	Group 2	Group 3	Group 4	Group 5
Argentina; Colombia	Uruguay; Venezuela	Brazil; Paraguay	Bolivia; Ecuador	Peru; Chile

== Group stage ==
=== Group 1 ===
Pos	Team	Pld	W	D	L	GF	GA	GD	Pts	Qualification	(Colombia) CALI	(Argentina) RIV	(Argentina) CEN	(Colombia) JUN
1	(Colombia) Deportivo Cali	6	4	0	2	10	6	+4	8	Qualified to the Semi-Finals	—	2–1	1–0	4–1
2	(Argentina) River Plate	6	3	1	2	9	6	+3	7		1–2	—	3–2	3–0
3	(Argentina) Rosario Central	6	3	0	3	11	7	+4	6		2–1	0–1	—	5–0
4	(Colombia) Junior	6	1	1	4	3	14	−11	3		1–0	0–0	1–2	—

Legend: Blue = home team win; Yellow = draw; Red = away team win.

=== Group 2 ===
Pos	Team	Pld	W	D	L	GF	GA	GD	Pts	Qualification	(Uruguay) PEÑ	(Uruguay) BVI	(Venezuela) EST	(Venezuela) POR
1	(Uruguay) Peñarol	6	5	1	0	13	3	+10	11	Qualified to the Semi-Finals	—	3–1	4–2	3–0
2	(Uruguay) Bella Vista	6	4	1	1	16	5	+11	9		0–0	—	3–1	4–0
3	(Venezuela) Estudiantes de Mérida	6	0	2	4	5	14	−9	2		0–2	1–4	—	1–1
4	(Venezuela) Portuguesa	6	0	2	4	1	13	−12	2		0–1	0–4	0–0	—

Legend: Blue = home team win; Yellow = draw; Red = away team win.

=== Group 3 ===
Pos	Team	Pld	W	D	L	GF	GA	GD	Pts	Qualification	(Brazil) FLA	(Brazil) CAM	(Paraguay) CER	(Paraguay) OLI
1	(Brazil) Flamengo (A, O)	6	2	4	0	14	9	+5	8	Qualified to the Semi-Finals	—	2–2	5–2	1–1
2	(Brazil) Atlético Mineiro (A)	6	2	4	0	8	6	+2	8		2–2	—	2–2	1–0
3	(Paraguay) Cerro Porteño	6	1	2	3	9	12	−3	4		2–4	0–1	—	0–0
4	(Paraguay) Olimpia	6	0	4	2	1	5	−4	4		0–0	0–0	0–3	—

Legend: Blue = home team win; Yellow = draw; Red = away team win.
(A) Advances to First-place playoff match; (O) Playoff winner; advances to semi-finals

3 July 1981	Atletico Mineiro (Brazil)	2–2	(Brazil) Flamengo	Mineirão, Belo Horizonte
	Éder 28', 63'		Nunes 65'; Marinho 85'	Attendance: 63,153; Referee: José Roberto Wright (Brazil)

7 July 1981	Cerro Porteño (Paraguay)	0–0	(Paraguay) Olimpia	Estadio Defensores del Chaco, Asunción

14 July 1981	Flamengo (Brazil)	5–2	(Paraguay) Cerro Porteño	Maracanã, Rio de Janeiro
	Zico 20', 27'; Baroninho 47'; Nunes 62', 62'		Jimenes 62'; Julio Dos Santos 90'	Attendance: 25,967; Referee: Carlos Montalvan (Brazil)

17 July 1981	Olimpia (Paraguay)	0–0	(Brazil) Atletico Mineiro	Estadio Defensores del Chaco, Asunción

21 July 1981	Cerro Porteño (Paraguay)	0–1	(Brazil) Atletico Mineiro	Estadio Defensores del Chaco, Asunción

24 July 1981	Flamengo (Brazil)	1–1	(Paraguay) Olimpia	Maracanã, Rio de Janeiro
	Adilio 22'		Solalinde 60'	Attendance: 38,718; Referee: Abel Gnecco

28 July 1981	Atletico Mineiro (Brazil)	1–0	(Paraguay) Olimpia	Mineirão, Belo Horizonte

31 July 1981	Atletico Mineiro (Brazil)	2–2	(Paraguay) Cerro Porteño	Mineirão, Belo Horizonte

7 August 1981	Flamengo (Brazil)	2–2	(Brazil) Atletico Mineiro	Maracanã, Rio de Janeiro
	Nunes 67'; Tita 69'		Palhinha 62'; Reinaldo 69'	Attendance: 62,763; Referee: Carlos Rosa Martins

8 August 1981	Olimpia (Paraguay)	0–3	(Paraguay) Cerro Porteño	Estadio Defensores del Chaco, Asunción

11 August 1981	Cerro Porteño (Paraguay)	2–4	(Brazil) Flamengo	Estadio Defensores del Chaco, Asunción
	Acost 69'; Jimenes 72'		Baroninho 7'; Zico 58', 65', 70'	Attendance: 13,000; Referee: Roque Cerullo

14 August 1981	Olimpia (Paraguay)	0–0	(Brazil) Flamengo	Estadio Defensores del Chaco, Asunción
				Attendance: 25,000; Referee: José Martizez Bazan

First-place playoff match 21 August 1981	Flamengo (Brazil)	0-0	(Brazil) Atlético Mineiro	Estádio Serra Dourada, Goiânia
				Attendance: 72,000; Referee: José Roberto Wright
Note: The match was suspended at 37 minutes of the first half, after 5 players of Atlético Mineiro received red cards. By association football rules a team is disqualified if it has fewer than 7 players. Therefore Flamengo won by WO.

=== Group 4 ===
Pos	Team	Pld	W	D	L	GF	GA	GD	Pts	Qualification	(Bolivia) STR	(Bolivia) WIL	(Ecuador) BAR	(Ecuador) TEC
1	(Bolivia) The Strongest	6	4	0	2	13	9	+4	8		—	2–0	1–0	4–2
2	(Bolivia) Jorge Wilstermann	6	4	0	2	9	9	0	8	Qualified to the Semi-Finals	3–2	—	1–0	3–1
3	(Ecuador) Barcelona	6	3	0	3	8	8	0	6		2–1	3–0	—	2–1
4	(Ecuador) Técnico Universitário	6	1	0	5	11	15	−4	2		2–3	1–2	4–1	—

Legend: Blue = home team win; Yellow = draw; Red = away team win.

==== Tiebreaker ====
Team 1	Score	Team 2
The Strongest (Bolivia)	1–4	(Bolivia) Jorge Wilstermann

=== Group 5 ===
Pos	Team	Pld	W	D	L	GF	GA	GD	Pts	Qualification	(Chile) COB	(Peru) SPC	(Chile) UCH	(Peru) TOR
1	(Chile) Cobreloa	6	3	3	0	14	3	+11	9	Qualified to the Semi-Finals	—	6–1	1–0	6–1
2	(Peru) Sporting Cristal	6	3	2	1	9	11	−2	8		0–0	—	3–2	2–1
3	Universidad de Chile	6	2	2	2	8	6	+2	6		0–0	1–1	—	3–0
4	(Peru) Atlético Torino	6	0	1	5	5	16	−11	1		1–1	1–2	1–2	—

Legend: Blue = home team win; Yellow = draw; Red = away team win.

== Semi-finals ==
=== Group A ===
Pos	Team	Pld	W	D	L	GF	GA	GD	Pts	Qualification	(Brazil) FLA	(Colombia) CAL	(Bolivia) JOR
1	(Brazil) Flamengo	4	4	0	0	10	2	+8	8	Qualified to the Final	—	3–0	4–1
2	(Colombia) Deportivo Cali	4	1	1	2	2	5	−3	3		0–1	—	1–0
3	(Bolivia) Jorge Wilstermann	4	0	1	3	3	8	−5	1		1–2	1–1	—

Legend: Blue = home team win; Yellow = draw; Red = away team win.

2 October 1981	Deportivo Cali (Colombia)	0–1	(Brazil) Flamengo	Estadio Olímpico Pascual Guerrero, Cali
			Nunes 1'	Attendance: 50,000; Referee: Mário Lira

13 October 1981	Jorge Wilstermann (Bolivia)	1–2	(Brazil) Flamengo	Estadio Félix Capriles, Cochabamba
	Melgar 53'		Baroninho 13'; Adilio 64'	Referee: Enrique Labo

16 October 1981	Deportivo Cali (Colombia)	1–0	(Bolivia) Jorge Wilstermann	Estadio Olímpico Pascual Guerrero, Cali

23 October 1981	Flamengo (Brazil)	3–0	(Colombia) Deportivo Cali	Maracanã, Rio de Janeiro
	Zico 9', 82'; Chiquinho Carioca 57'			Attendance: 28,847; Referee: Juan Cardelino

27 October 1981	Jorge Wilstermann (Bolivia)	1–1	(Colombia) Deportivo Cali	Estadio Félix Capriles, Cochabamba

30 October 1981	Flamengo (Brazil)	4–1	(Bolivia) Jorge Wilstermann	Maracanã, Rio de Janeiro
	Nunes 9'; Adilio 39'; Anselmo 87'; Chiquinho Carioca 90'		Tarborga 2'	Attendance: 7,520; Referee: Jorge Orellana

=== Group B ===
Pos	Team	Pld	W	D	L	GF	GA	GD	Pts	Qualification	(Chile) COB	(Uruguay) NAC	(Uruguay) PEÑ
1	(Chile) Cobreloa	4	3	1	0	9	5	+4	7	Qualified to the Final	—	2–2	4–2
2	(Uruguay) Nacional	4	0	3	1	5	6	−1	3		1–2	—	1–1
3	(Uruguay) Peñarol	4	0	2	2	4	7	−3	2		0–1	1–1	—

Legend: Blue = home team win; Yellow = draw; Red = away team win.

30 September 1981	Peñarol (Uruguay)	1–1	(Uruguay) Nacional	Estadio Centenario, Montevideo
	Vargas 77'		de la Peña 44'

8 October 1981	Nacional (Uruguay)	1–2	(Chile) Cobreloa	Estadio Centenario, Montevideo
	Morales 49'		Puebla 62'; Olivera 83'

13 October 1981	Peñarol (Uruguay)	0–1	(Chile) Cobreloa	Estadio Centenario, Montevideo
			Olivera 89'

21 October 1981	Nacional (Uruguay)	1–1	(Uruguay) Peñarol	Estadio Centenario, Montevideo
	Espárrago 73'		Marcenaro 89'

28 October 1981	Cobreloa (Chile)	4–2	(Uruguay) Peñarol	Estadio Municipal, Calama
	Raúl Gómez 1'; Víctor Merello 30' 66' (pen.); Oscar Muñoz 68'		Paz 70' (pen.); Vargas 88'

4 November 1981	Cobreloa (Chile)	2–2	(Uruguay) Nacional	Estadio Municipal, Calama
	Oscar Muñoz 67'; Luzardo 73' (o.g.)		Cabrera 39'; Luzardo 90' (pen.)

== Finals ==
13 November 1981	Flamengo (Brazil)	2–1	(Chile) Cobreloa	Maracanã, Rio de Janeiro
	Zico 12', 30' (pen.)		Merello 65'	Attendance: 93,985; Referee: Esposito (Argentina)

20 November 1981	Cobreloa (Chile)	1–0	(Brazil) Flamengo	Estadio Nacional, Santiago
	Merello 84'			Attendance: 61,721; Referee: Ramón Barreto (Uruguay)

23 November 1981	Flamengo (Brazil)	2–0 (4–2 agg.)	(Chile) Cobreloa	Estadio Centenario, Montevideo
	Zico 18', 84'			Attendance: 30,200; Referee: Roque Cerullo (Uruguay)
