= Roberto César (footballer, born 1955) =

Brazilian footballer

Personal information
- Full name: Roberto César Itacaramby
- Date of birth: February 14, 1955 (age 71)
- Place of birth: Brazil
- Position: Forward

Senior career*
Years	Team	Apps	(Gls)
1974–1976	Cruzeiro	4	(0)
1977–1978	Operário-CG	16	(8)
1978–1981	Cruzeiro	57	(26)
1984–1985	Portuguesa	10	(1)
1985	Grêmio	10	(3)
- * Club domestic league appearances and goals

Roberto César Itacaramby, commonly known as just Roberto César (born February 14, 1955), is a former association footballer who played forward; he played in several Brazilian Série A clubs. He was the top goal scorer of the 1979 Série A.

== Career ==
Roberto César played four Série A games for Cruzeiro between 1974 and 1976, without scoring a goal, before moving to Operário-CG in 1976. He played 16 Série A games and scored eight goals for the Campo Grande club in 1977 and in 1978, before returning to Cruzeiro in 1978. Roberto César scored 26 goals in 56 Série A games between 1978 and 1981, and finished as the 1979 Série A top goal scorer with 12 goals. After leaving Cruzeiro, he defended Portuguesa in 1984 and in 1985, scoring a goal in ten Série A games, and Grêmio in 1985, in which he scored three goals in ten Série A games.
