= Antonio Solalinde =

Antonio García de Solalinde
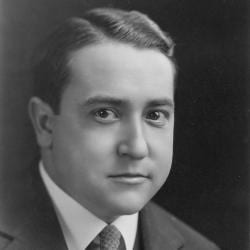
- Antonio Garcia Solalinde photo
- Born: 28 December 1892; Toro, Spain
- Died: 13 July 1937 (aged 44); Madison, Wisconsin
- Education: University of Madrid
- Occupations: Writer, professor and philologist
- Spouse: Jesusa Alfau Galván de Solalinde

Antonio García de Solalinde (28 December 1892 in Toro, Spain – 13 July 1937 in Madison, Wisconsin) was a writer, professor and philologist.

== Life ==
He was born in the town of Toro in the province of Zamoro, Spain. He was educated at the University of Madrid, receiving his Licenciado en Letras, 1918, and his Doctor en Letras, 1924.

He was director of the Escuela Española de Historia y Arqueología en Roma (EEHAR) (Spanish School of History and Archaeology in Rome) and an important collaborator in the Revista de Filología Española (Magazine of Spanish Philology). Solalinde eventually relocated to the United States where he was employed as a professor at a number of diverse universities.

He published a number of scholarly works, including Milagros de Nuestra Señora, a treatise on Gonzalo de Berceo, and diverse articles relating to the work of king Alfonso X of Castile and his relationship to the Siete Partidas, Spain's seven part legal code that was followed for centuries both there and in Latin America, such as El códice florentino de las 'Cantigas' y su relación con los demás manuscritos (The Florentine codex of the 'Songs' and its relation with other manuscripts) and Intervención personal de Alfonso X en la redacción de sus obras (the personal Intervention of Alfonso X in the writing of his works).

Solalinde was married to the writer and painter Jesusa Alfau Galván de Solalinde. He died in 1937 of a heart attack while an associate professor at the University of Wisconsin–Madison.
