= 1985 São Paulo FC season =

São Paulo
1985 season
- Chairman: Carlos Miguel Aidar
- Manager: Cilinho
- Série A: First stage
- Campeonato Paulista: Champions (14th title)
- Top goalscorer: League: Careca (12); All: Careca (35)

The 1985 season was São Paulo's 56th season since club's existence.

== Statistics ==
=== Scorers ===
Position	Nation	Playing position	Name	Campeonato Brasileiro	Campeonato Paulista	Others	Total
1	(Brazil)	FW	Careca	12	23	0	35
2	(Brazil)	FW	Müller	4	20	0	24
3	(Brazil)	MF	Pianelli	1	7	4	12
4	(Brazil)	MF	Pita	4	2	1	7
=	(Brazil)	FW	Sídney	3	4	0	7
=	(Brazil)	MF	Silas	3	3	1	7
5	(Brazil)	FW	Freitas	0	3	1	4
6	(Brazil)	DF	Darío Pereyra	0	3	0	3
=	(Brazil)	MF	Márcio Araújo	1	2	0	3
=	(Brazil)	FW	Newton	2	1	0	3
=	(Brazil)	DF	Oscar	3	0	0	3
7	(Brazil)	DF	Éder Taino	1	1	0	2
=	(Brazil)	DF	Fonseca	0	2	0	2
=	(Brazil)	MF	Vizolli	1	0	1	2
8	(Brazil)	FW	Agnaldo	0	0	1	1
=	(Brazil)	FW	Geraldo	1	0	0	1
=	(Brazil)	DF	Nelsinho	0	0	1	1
			Own goals	0	0	1	1
			Total	36	71	14	121

=== Overall ===
Games played	71 (20 Campeonato Brasileiro, 42 Campeonato Paulista, 9 Friendly match)
Games won	35 (7 Campeonato Brasileiro, 23 Campeonato Paulista, 5 Friendly match)
Games drawn	21 (6 Campeonato Brasileiro, 12 Campeonato Paulista, 2 Friendly match)
Games lost	16 (7 Campeonato Brasileiro, 7 Campeonato Paulista, 2 Friendly match)
Goals scored	121
Goals conceded	74
Goal difference	+47
Best result	5–0 (H) v São Bento - Campeonato Paulista - 1985.07.31
Worst result	2–4 (A) v Atlético Mineiro - Campeonato Brasileiro - 1985.02.10
Top scorer	Careca (35)

Source: São Paulo FC

== Friendlies ==
April 20 National	Bragantino	4–3	São Paulo	Bragança Paulista
	Goal		Goal	Stadium: Estádio Marcelo Stéfani

April 28 National	Jacareí	0–4	São Paulo	Jacareí
			Pita 43'; Agnaldo 68'; Vizolli 82'; Pianelli 85'	Stadium: Estádio Antonio Jordão Mercadante; Referee: Almir Laguna

May 21 Taça Jaime Gil	Votuporanguense	1–0	São Paulo	Votuporanga
	Itamar 66'			Stadium: Estádio Municipal Plínio Marin; Referee: Valter Marcondes

June 6 National	Catanduvense	1–2	São Paulo	Catanduva
	Claudinho 64'		Nelsinho 22'; Pianelli 38'	Stadium: Estádio Silvio Salles; Referee: Claudinei Alves

June 9 National	Fernandópolis	1–1	São Paulo	Fernandópolis
	Gustavo 79'		Silas 18'	Stadium: Estádio John Kennedy; Referee: Claudinei Alves

September 26 Troféu Oscar Bernardi	São Paulo	1–0	Internacional	São Paulo
	Mauro Galvão 3' (o.g.)			Stadium: Estádio Cícero Pompeu de Toledo (Morumbi); Referee: José de Assis Aragão

November 5 National	Operário VG	0–1	São Paulo	Cuiabá
			Pianelli 18'	Stadium: Verdão; Referee: Aílton Franco

=== Torneio Triangular LuIz Henrique Rosas ===
July 18 National	Avaí	0–1	São Paulo	Florianópolis
			Freitas 51'	Stadium: Estádio Orlando Scarpelli; Referee: Aparecido Brito

July 20 National	Figueirense	1–1	São Paulo	Florianópolis
	Sérgio Luís 29'		Pianelli 24'	Stadium: Estádio Orlando Scarpelli; Attendance: 2,854; Referee: Alan Abreu

== Official competitions ==
=== Campeonato Brasileiro ===
==== First round ====
Pos	Team	Pld	W	D	L	GF	GA	GD	Pts
3	(Rio de Janeiro (state)) Vasco da Gama	10	4	3	3	18	16	+2	11
4	(Pernambuco) Náutico	10	4	3	3	11	9	+2	11
5	(São Paulo (state)) São Paulo	10	4	2	4	17	19	−2	10
6	(São Paulo (state)) Santos	10	4	2	4	11	13	−2	10
7	(Minas Gerais) Cruzeiro	10	3	4	3	11	10	+1	10

Source: rsssf.com

===== Matches =====
January 27 First stage 1	Coritiba	3–1	São Paulo	Curitiba
	Tóbi 10'; Índio 49', 88'		Sidnei 35'	Stadium: Estádio Major Antônio do Couto Pereira; Attendance: 19,764; Referee: Roque José Gallas

January 31 First stage 2	Guarani	3–2	São Paulo	Campinas
	Edmar 14', 76'; João Paulo 89'		Pianelli 19'; Pita 66'	Stadium: Estádio Brinco de Ouro da Princesa; Attendance: 4,356; Referee: Wilson Carlos dos Santos

February 3 First stage 3	Palmeiras	2–2	São Paulo	São Paulo
	Márcio 60'; Barbosa 67'		Pita 15'; Éder Taino 64'	Stadium: Estádio Cícero Pompeu de Toledo (Morumbi); Attendance: 17,732; Referee: Dulcídio Wanderley Boschilla

February 6 First stage 4	São Paulo	3–1	Botafogo	São Paulo
	Geraldo Touro 42'; Newton 56'; Careca 81'		Renato 82'	Stadium: Estádio Cícero Pompeu de Toledo (Morumbi); Attendance: 5,217; Referee: José Roberto Ramiz Wright

February 10 First stage 5	Atlético Mineiro	4–2	São Paulo	Belo Horizonte
	Nelinho 59'; Walter Olivera 69'; Sergio Araújo 70'; Éder 82'		Márcio Araújo 6'; Careca 65'	Stadium: Estádio Governador Magalhães Pinto (Mineirão); Attendance: 20,888; Referee: Arnaldo David Cezar Coelho

February 14 First stage 6	São Paulo	0–2	Corinthians	São Paulo
			João Paulo 14'; Serginho 34'	Stadium: Estádio Cícero Pompeu de Toledo (Morumbi); Attendance: 16,522; Referee: Romualdo Arppi Filho

February 24 First stage 7	São Paulo	2–1	Fluminense	São Paulo
	Sidnei 53'; Pita 77'		Assis 87'	Stadium: Estádio Cícero Pompeu de Toledo (Morumbi); Attendance: 8,951; Referee: Gilson Ramos Cordeiro

February 27 First stage 8	São Paulo	2–1	Santa Cruz	São Paulo
	Careca 4'; Müller 60'		Roberto 33'	Stadium: Estádio Cícero Pompeu de Toledo (Morumbi); Attendance: 3,696; Referee: Valquir Pimentel

March 3 First stage 9	Grêmio	2–2	São Paulo	Porto Alegre
	Luis Fernando 19'; Valdo 53'		Oscar 62'; Vizolli 89'	Stadium: Estádio Olímpico Monumental; Attendance: 19,534; Referee: Wilson Carlos dos Santos

March 6 First stage 10	São Paulo	1–0	America-RJ	São Paulo
	Careca 9'			Stadium: Estádio Cícero Pompeu de Toledo (Morumbi); Attendance: 4,848; Referee: Carlos Sergio Rosa Martins

==== Second round ====
Pos	Team	Pld	W	D	L	GF	GA	GD	Pts
4	(Rio Grande do Sul) Internacional	10	3	4	3	9	7	+2	10
5	(São Paulo (state)) Santos	10	3	4	3	12	12	0	10
6	(São Paulo (state)) São Paulo	10	3	4	3	19	20	−1	10
7	(Pernambuco) Náutico	10	4	1	5	14	19	−5	9
8	(Rio de Janeiro (state)) Flamengo	10	3	3	4	21	13	+8	9

Source: rsssf.com

===== Matches =====
March 9 First stage 11	São Paulo	0–1	Coritiba	São Paulo
			Heraldo 68'	Stadium: Estádio Cícero Pompeu de Toledo (Morumbi); Attendance: 10,958; Referee: Manuel Serapião Filho

March 13 First stage 12	São Paulo	3–3	Guarani	São Paulo
	Careca 10', 16'; Müller 67'		Edmar 3'; Julio César 35'; Neto 87'	Stadium: Estádio Cícero Pompeu de Toledo (Morumbi); Attendance: 5,771; Referee: Roberto Nunes Morgado

March 16 First stage 13	São Paulo	4–4	Palmeiras	São Paulo
	Pita 11'; Müller 45'; Careca 48'; Oscar 73'		Jorginho 40'; Mendonça 62', 65'; Ditinho 90'	Stadium: Estádio Municipal Paulo Machado de Carvalho (Pacaembu); Attendance: 22,103; Referee: Luís Carlos Antunes

March 20 First stage 14	Botafogo	3–1	São Paulo	Rio de Janeiro
	Helinho 18', 34'; Elói 65'		Careca 39'	Stadium: Estádio Jornalista Mário Filho (Maracanã); Attendance: 16,643; Referee: Carlos Sergio Rosa Martins

March 23 First stage 15	São Paulo	1–1	Atlético Mineiro	São Paulo
	Silas 20'		Nelinho 31'	Stadium: Estádio Municipal Paulo Machado de Carvalho (Pacaembu); Attendance: 17,695; Referee: Tito Rodrigues

March 28 First stage 16	Corinthians	1–2	São Paulo	São Paulo
	João Paulo 78'		Müller 40'; Oscar 90'	Stadium: Estádio Municipal Paulo Machado de Carvalho (Pacaembu); Attendance: 28,822; Referee: José de Assis Aragão

March 31 First stage 17	Fluminense	1–2	São Paulo	Rio de Janeiro
	Renê 15'		Newton 59'; Sidnei 67'	Stadium: Estádio Jornalista Mário Filho (Maracanã); Attendance: 14,988; Referee: Roque José Gallas

April 7 First stage 18	Santa Cruz	2–3	São Paulo	Recife
	Roberto 51'; Marlon 87'		Careca 6', 19'; Silas 30'	Stadium: Estádio José do Rego Maciel (Arruda); Attendance: 5,670; Referee: Carlos Sergio Rosa Martins

April 11 First stage 19	São Paulo	2–2	Grêmio	São Paulo
	Careca 52'; Silas 80'		Bonamigo 7'; Caio 16'	Stadium: Estádio Municipal Paulo Machado de Carvalho (Pacaembu); Attendance: 28,547; Referee: José Roberto Ramiz Wright

April 14 First stage 20	America-RJ	2–1	São Paulo	Rio de Janeiro
	Zó 13'; Luisinho 31'		Careca 43'	Stadium: Estádio Vasco da Gama (São Januário); Attendance: 827; Referee: Nei Andrade Nunesmaia

==== Record ====
Pos	Team	Pld	W	D	L	GF	GA	GD	Pts
20	Náutico	20	8	4	8	25	28	−3	20
21	Santos	20	7	6	7	23	25	−2	20
22	São Paulo	20	7	6	7	36	39	−3	20
23	Cruzeiro	20	5	8	7	23	22	+1	18
24	Palmeiras	20	5	8	7	28	28	0	18

Source: rsssf.com

Final Position	Points	Matches	Wins	Draws	Losses	Goals For	Goals Away	Win%
22nd	20	20	7	6	7	36	39	50%

=== First phase ===
Pos	Team	Pld	W	D	L	GF	GA	GD	Pts	Qualification or relegation
1	Portuguesa	19	10	8	1	0	0	0	28	Qualified as stage winners
2	São Paulo	19	9	6	4	0	0	0	24	
3	Corinthians	19	8	8	3	0	0	0	24	
4	América	19	7	8	4	0	0	0	22	
5	Guarani	19	6	10	3	0	0	0	22	

Updated to match(es) played on November 24, 1985. Source: RSSSF.com
Rules for classification: 1) points; 2) wins; 3) goal difference; 4) number of goals scored.

1 May 1985 1	Botafogo	1–1	São Paulo	Ribeirão Preto
	Nelson 14'		Pianelli 71'	Stadium: Estádio Santa Cruz; Attendance: 6,463; Referee: Luís Carlos Antunes

8 May 1985 2	Paulista	2–1	São Paulo	Jundiaí
	Joãozinho 45'; Gil 73'		Pereyra 29'	Stadium: Estádio Municipal Doutor Jayme Pinheiro de Ulhoa Cintra; Attendance: 13,821; Referee: José Luís Guidotti

11 May 1985 3	São Paulo	0–0	Santo André	São Paulo
				Stadium: Estádio Cícero Pompeu de Toledo (Morumbi); Attendance: 3,151; Referee: Flávio de Carvalho

19 May 1985 4	América	3–2	São Paulo	São José do Rio Preto
	Toninho 10', 24'; Mané 56'		Pianelli 33'; Fonseca 85'	Stadium: Estádio Mário Alves de Mendonça; Attendance: 5,864; Referee: Antônio de Pádua Sales

26 May 1985 5	Portuguesa	0–3	São Paulo	São Paulo
			Pianelli 16', 61'; Müller 89'	Stadium: Estádio Municipal Paulo Machado de Carvalho (Pacaembu); Attendance: 10,393; Referee: Antônio Carlos Saraiva

16 June 1985 6	XV de Piracicaba	1–0	São Paulo	Piracicaba
	Machado 60'			Stadium: Estádio Municipal Barão da Serra Negra; Attendance: 5,324; Referee: Luís Carlos Antunes

19 June 1985 7	São Paulo	2–1	Ponte Preta	São Paulo
	Müller 26', 85'		Chicão 89'	Stadium: Estádio Municipal Paulo Machado de Carvalho (Pacaembu); Attendance: 18,098; Referee: Antônio de Paula e Silva

22 June 1985 8	São Paulo	2–0	XV de Jaú	São Paulo
	Sídnei 14'; Müller 43'			Stadium: Estádio Municipal Paulo Machado de Carvalho (Pacaembu); Attendance: 14,122; Referee: Edgar de Lemos Dias

30 June 1985 9	Noroeste	1–1	São Paulo	Bauru
	Osmair 66'		Pita 43'	Stadium: Estádio Doutor Alfredo de Castilho; Attendance: 9,284; Referee: José Luís Guidotti

3 July 1985 10	São Paulo	0–0	Marília	São Paulo
				Stadium: Estádio Cícero Pompeu de Toledo (Morumbi); Attendance: 2,846; Referee: Donato Roberto Forcela

7 July 1985 11	Santos	1–1	São Paulo	São Paulo
	Mário Sergio 50'		Müller 33'	Stadium: Estádio Cícero Pompeu de Toledo (Morumbi); Attendance: 11,681; Referee: Roberto Nunes Morgado

11 July 1985 12	São Paulo	2–0	Juventus	São Paulo
	Careca 58'; Silas 70'			Stadium: Estádio Municipal Paulo Machado de Carvalho (Pacaembu); Attendance: 4,023; Referee: Valter Gabriel Mitre

14 July 1985 13	São Paulo	3–2	Palmeiras	São Paulo
	Müller 8', 59'; Fonseca 54'		Hélio 70'; Mendonça 90'	Stadium: Estádio Cícero Pompeu de Toledo (Morumbi); Attendance: 16,580; Referee: Dulcídio Wanderley Boschilla

31 July 1985 14	São Paulo	5–0	São Bento	São Paulo
	Márcio Araújo 21'; Careca 28', 32', 83'; Pianelli 42'			Stadium: Estádio Cícero Pompeu de Toledo (Morumbi); Attendance: 2,989; Referee: Douglas las Casas

4 August 1985 15	São Paulo	1–0	Corinthians	São Paulo
	Éder Taino 51'			Stadium: Estádio Cícero Pompeu de Toledo (Morumbi); Attendance: 26,332; Referee: Ulisses Tavares da Silva Filho

7 August 1985 16	Ferroviária	0–0	São Paulo	Araraquara
				Stadium: Estádio Doutor Adhemar de Barros (Fonte Luminosa); Attendance: 7,565; Referee: José de Assis Aragão

10 August 1985 17	São Paulo	3–0	Comercial	São Paulo
	Careca 28', 52'; Pianelli 34'			Stadium: Estádio Cícero Pompeu de Toledo (Morumbi); Attendance: 5,709; Referee: Antônio de Paula e Silva

14 August 1985 18	São Paulo	3–1	Internacional	São Paulo
	Careca 40', 87'; Pianelli 53'		Gilberto Costa 46'	Stadium: Estádio Cícero Pompeu de Toledo (Morumbi); Attendance: 5,319; Referee: João Leopoldo Ayeta

17 August 1985 19	Guarani	1–0	São Paulo	Campinas
	Neto 15'			Stadium: Estádio Brinco de Ouro da Princesa; Attendance: 7,634; Referee: Ulisses Tavares da Silva Filho

==== Second phase ====
Pos	Team	Pld	W	D	L	GF	GA	GD	Pts	Qualification or relegation
1	São Paulo	19	11	5	3	0	0	0	27	Qualified as stage winners
2	Portuguesa	19	8	8	3	0	0	0	24	
3	Ferroviária	19	8	7	4	0	0	0	23	
4	Guarani	19	8	7	4	0	0	0	23	
5	Palmeiras	19	7	8	4	0	0	0	22	

Updated to match(es) played on November 24, 1985. Source: RSSSF.com
Rules for classification: 1) points; 2) wins; 3) goal difference; 4) number of goals scored.

===== Matches =====
August 25 1	Santo André	0–0	São Paulo	Santo André
				Stadium: Estádio Municipal Bruno José Daniel; Attendance: 3,325; Referee: Roberto Nunes Morgado

August 28 2	São Paulo	2–0	Paulista	São Paulo
	Newton 24'; Pita 66'			Stadium: Estádio Cícero Pompeu de Toledo (Morumbi); Attendance: 3,066; Referee: Edivaldo Pereira da Silva

September 1 3	São Paulo	2–0	Botafogo	São Paulo
	Sídnei 66'; Márcio Araújo 72'			Stadium: Estádio Cícero Pompeu de Toledo (Morumbi); Attendance: 6,076; Referee: Almir Ricci Peixoto Laguna

September 7 4	Comercial	1–1	São Paulo	Ribeirão Preto
	Manguinha 3'		Freitas 88'	Stadium: Estádio Doutor Francisco de Palma Travassos; Attendance: 5,920; Referee: Joel Teixeira Caíres

September 15 5	Corinthians	1–1	São Paulo	São Paulo
	Serginho 34'		Careca 80'	Stadium: Estádio Municipal Paulo Machado de Carvalho (Pacaembu); Attendance: 36,961; Referee: Roberto Nunes Morgado

September 18 6	Juventus	0–2	São Paulo	São Paulo
			Freitas 37'; Müller 84'	Stadium: Estádio Municipal Paulo Machado de Carvalho (Pacaembu); Attendance: 10,810; Referee: Dulcídio Wanderley Boschilla

September 22 7	XV de Jaú	0–3	São Paulo	Jaú
			Müller 25', 65'; Careca 49'	Stadium: Estádio Municipal José Magalhães de Almeida Prado; Attendance: 4,267; Referee: Ivo José da Costa Junior

September 29 8	Internacional	2–2	São Paulo	Limeira
	Éder 74', 79'		Müller 49'; Careca 78'	Stadium: Estádio Municipal Major José Levy Sobrinho; Attendance: 9,571

October 2 9	São Paulo	4–0	América	São Paulo
	Careca 29'; Müller 72', 84'; Pereyra 87'			Stadium: Estádio Cícero Pompeu de Toledo (Morumbi); Attendance: 8,905; Referee: Antônio Fonseca Ribeiro

October 6 10	São Paulo	0–1	Portuguesa	São Paulo
			Pereyra 30' (o.g.)	Stadium: Estádio Cícero Pompeu de Toledo (Morumbi); Attendance: 31,605; Referee: Ilton José da Costa

October 13 11	Marília	0–2	São Paulo	Marília
			Silas 71', 89'	Stadium: Estádio Municipal Bento de Abreu Sampaio Vidal; Attendance: 5,768; Referee: José Carlos Gomes do Nascimento

October 17 12	São Paulo	4–2	Ferroviária	São Paulo
	Careca 41', 77'; Müller 43', 73'		Marcão 15'; Serginho Dourado 56'	Stadium: Estádio Cícero Pompeu de Toledo (Morumbi); Attendance: 9,009; Referee: Oswaldo dos Santos Ramos

October 20 13	São Paulo	2–0	Guarani	São Paulo
	Careca 49'; Sídnei 74'			Stadium: Estádio Cícero Pompeu de Toledo (Morumbi); Attendance: 18,734; Referee: Ulisses Tavares da Silva Filho

October 27 14	São Paulo	3–0	Santos	São Paulo
	Careca 12', 65'; Serginho 68' (o.g.)			Stadium: Estádio Cícero Pompeu de Toledo (Morumbi); Attendance: 50,659; Referee: Almir Ricci Peixoto Laguna

October 30 15	São Paulo	1–1	XV de Piracicaba	São Paulo
	Careca 21'		Ijuí 68'	Stadium: Estádio Cícero Pompeu de Toledo (Morumbi); Attendance: 10,515; Referee: Ulisses Tavares da Silva Filho

November 2 16	São Bento	0–1	São Paulo	Sorocaba
			Careca 65'	Stadium: Estádio Municipal Wálter Ribeiro; Attendance: 10,473; Referee: Roberto Nunes Morgado

November 10 17	Palmeiras	2–1	São Paulo	São Paulo
	Oscar 61' (o.g.); Hélio 87'		Müller 18'	Stadium: Estádio Cícero Pompeu de Toledo (Morumbi); Attendance: 46,107; Referee: João Leopoldo Ayeta

November 16 18	Ponte Preta	2–0	São Paulo	Campinas
	Jorge Mendonça 39'; Vagner 55'			Stadium: Estádio Moisés Lucarelli; Attendance: 4,232; Referee: Ulisses Tavares da Silva Filho

November 24 19	São Paulo	2–0	Noroeste	São Paulo
	Müller 31'; Freitas 67'			Stadium: Estádio Cícero Pompeu de Toledo (Morumbi); Attendance: 6,436; Referee: José de Assis Aragão

==== Final standings ====
Pos	Team	Pld	W	D	L	GF	GA	GD	Pts	Qualification or relegation
1	Portuguesa	38	18	16	4	49	27	+22	52	Qualified as stage winners
2	São Paulo	38	20	11	7	63	26	+37	51	Qualified as stage winners
3	Guarani	38	14	17	7	38	34	+4	45	Qualified due to best season record
4	Ferroviária	38	14	14	10	41	38	+3	42	Qualified due to best season record
5	Corinthians	38	12	18	8	41	33	+8	42	

Updated to match(es) played on November 24, 1985. Source: RSSSF.com
Rules for classification: 1) points; 2) wins; 3) goal difference; 4) number of goals scored.

==== Semifinals ====
November 30 Semi-finals	Guarani	1–1	São Paulo	Campinas
	Julio César 86'		Müller 69'	Stadium: Estádio Brinco de Ouro da Princesa; Attendance: 23,829; Referee: Dulcídio Wanderley Boschilla

December 7 Semi-finals	São Paulo	3–0	Guarani	São Paulo
	Careca 25', 79'; Müller 58'			Stadium: Estádio Cícero Pompeu de Toledo (Morumbi); Attendance: 45,575; Referee: Ulisses Tavares da Silva Filho

==== Finals ====
December 15 Finals	São Paulo	3–1	Portuguesa	São Paulo
	Pereyra 33'; Careca 64', 70'		Jorginho 88'	Stadium: Estádio Cícero Pompeu de Toledo (Morumbi); Attendance: 87,602; Referee: Antônio de Paula e Silva

December 22 Finals	Portuguesa	1–2	São Paulo	São Paulo
	Esquerdinha 32'		Sidnei 24'; Müller 67'	Stadium: Estádio Cícero Pompeu de Toledo (Morumbi); Attendance: 99,025; Referee: José Carlos Gomes do Nascimento

==== Record ====
Final Position	Points	Matches	Wins	Draws	Losses	Goals For	Goals Away	Win%
1st	58	42	23	12	7	72	29	69%
