= 1986 São Paulo FC season =

São Paulo
1986 season
- Chairman: Carlos Miguel Aidar (re-elected in April 16)
- Manager: Cilinho (until July 13); José Carlos Serrão (caretaker, until September 9); Pepe
- Série A: Winners (2nd title) (In 1987 Copa Libertadores)
- Campeonato Paulista: 6th
- Top goalscorer: League: Careca (26); All: Careca (33)

The 1986 season was São Paulo's 57th season since club's existence.

== Statistics ==
=== Scorers ===
Position	Nation	Playing position	Name	Campeonato Paulista	Campeonato Brasileiro	Others	Total
1	(Brazil)	FW	Careca	7	26	0	33
2	(Brazil)	FW	Müller	6	10	1	17
3	(Brazil)	MF	Silas	4	9	3	16
4	(Brazil)	FW	Manu	12	1	0	13
5	(Brazil)	MF	Pita	7	5	0	12
6	(Brazil)	MF	Bernardo	2	3	0	5
7	(Brazil)	MF	Pianelli	3	0	1	4
8	(Brazil)	FW	Freitas	2	0	1	3
=	(Brazil)	FW	Sídney	1	2	0	3
=	(Brazil)	DF	Wagner Basílio	3	0	0	3
=	(Brazil)	DF	Zé Teodoro	0	3	0	3
9	(Brazil)	DF	Nelsinho	0	1	1	2
10	(Brazil)	DF	Capone	1	0	0	1
=	(Uruguay)	DF	Darío Pereyra	0	1	0	1
=	(Brazil)	MF	Falcão	0	0	1	1
=	(Brazil)	FW	Marcelo	1	0	0	1
=	(Brazil)	DF	Oscar	0	1	0	1
=	(Brazil)	FW	Wagner Lopes	1	0	0	1
			Total	50	62	8	120

=== Managers performance ===
Name	Nationality	From	To	P	W	D	L	GF	GA	%
Cilinho	Brazil	2 February	13 July	33	8	19	6	41	34	53%
José Carlos Serrão (caretaker)	Brazil	9 March	6 September	16	6	8	2	20	10	55%
Pepe	Brazil	14 September	25 February 1987	33	17	12	4	64	21	69%

=== Overall ===
Games played	80 (38 Campeonato Paulista, 34 Campeonato Brasileiro, 8 Friendly match)
Games won	30 (11 Campeonato Paulista, 17 Campeonato Brasileiro, 2 Friendly match)
Games drawn	38 (20 Campeonato Paulista, 13 Campeonato Brasileiro, 5 Friendly match)
Games lost	12 (7 Campeonato Paulista, 4 Campeonato Brasileiro, 1 Friendly match)
Goals scored	120
Goals conceded	64
Goal difference	+56
Best result	6–1 (H) v Ponte Preta - Campeonato Brasileiro - 1986.12.10
Worst result	1–4 (A) v Juventus - Campeonato Paulista - 1986.4.16
Top scorer	Careca (33)

Source: São Paulo FC

== Friendlies ==
February 19 National	Mauaense (São Paulo (state))	1–1	(São Paulo (state)) São Paulo	Mauá
	Giba 3'		Freitas 17'	Stadium: Estádio Municipal Pedro Benedetti; Attendance: 3,000; Referee: Sergio Corrêa da Silva

February 22 National	Taubaté (São Paulo (state))	1–1	(São Paulo (state)) São Paulo	Taubaté
	Carlos Augusto 71'		Pianelli 89'	Stadium: Estádio Joaquim de Morais Filho; Referee: Pedro Inácio Filho

March 9 Taça Ceres	Ceres (Goiás)	0–1	(São Paulo (state)) São Paulo	Ceres
			Nelsinho 42'	Stadium: Estádio Municipal José de Deus Rivatti

August 24 Troféu Gov. José Moraes	Rio Branco (Espírito Santo)	0–0	(São Paulo (state)) São Paulo	Cariacica
				Stadium: Estádio Engenheiro de Alencar Araripe; Attendance: 4,004; Referee: José Filho

=== Taça dos Campeões Rio-São Paulo ===
February 2 RJ–SP Champions Cup	Fluminense (Rio de Janeiro (state))	2–2	(São Paulo (state)) São Paulo	Rio de Janeiro
	Renê 23'; Ricardo 76'		Silas 15', 53'	Stadium: Estádio das Laranjeiras; Attendance: 3,770; Referee: Luís Carlos Félix

February 6 RJ–SP Champions Cup	São Paulo (São Paulo (state))	2–0	(Rio de Janeiro (state)) Fluminense	São Paulo
	Falcão 37'; Silas 43'			Stadium: Estádio Municipal Paulo Machado de Carvalho (Pacaembu); Attendance: 9,455; Referee: Romualdo Arppi Filho

=== Trofeo Teresa Herrera ===
August 9 International	Santos (Brazil)	1–0	(Brazil) São Paulo	A Coruña
	Serginho 81'			Stadium: Estadio Riazor; Attendance: 20,000; Referee: Teodoro Valdéz Sanches

August 10 International	Real Madrid (Spain)	1–1 (2–4 p)	(Brazil) São Paulo	A Coruña
	Sánchez 49'		Müller 90'	Stadium: Estadio Riazor; Referee: López Grandal

== Official competitions ==
=== Campeonato Paulista ===
==== First stage ====
Pos	Team	Pld	W	D	L	GF	GA	GD	Pts	Qualification or relegation
1	Santos	19	11	4	4	30	15	+15	26	Qualified as stage winners
2	Portuguesa	19	10	5	4	29	21	+8	25	
3	Palmeiras	19	9	5	5	28	19	+9	23	
4	Juventus	19	10	3	6	28	21	+7	23	
5	Corinthians	19	8	6	5	27	19	+8	22	
6	Inter de Limeira	19	7	7	5	25	18	+7	21	
7	São Paulo	19	6	9	4	24	36	−12	21	
8	Ponte Preta	19	7	7	5	26	22	+4	21	
9	São Bento	19	7	6	6	14	16	−2	20	

Updated to match(es) played on August 17, 1986. Source: RSSSF.com
Rules for classification: 1) points; 2) wins; 3) goal difference; 4) number of goals scored.

===== Matches =====
February 25 1	São Paulo	1–1	América	São Paulo
	Manu 60'		Dito Siqueira 48'	Stadium: Estádio Municipal Paulo Machado de Carvalho (Pacaembu); Attendance: 4,580; Referee: Romualdo Arppi Filho

March 2 2	São Paulo	3–0	Botafogo	São Paulo
	Capone 6'; Freitas 48'; Manu 80'			Stadium: Estádio Municipal Paulo Machado de Carvalho (Pacaembu); Attendance: 5,098; Referee: Douglas Gonçalves Las Casas

March 5 3	Ponte Preta	1–1	São Paulo	Campinas
	Valdir 53'		Freitas 38'	Stadium: Estádio Moisés Lucarelli; Attendance: 4,976; Referee: Ulisses Tavares da Silva Filho

March 12 4	São Paulo	0–0	Ferroviária	São Paulo
				Stadium: Estádio Cícero Pompeu de Toledo (Morumbi); Attendance: 1,737; Referee: José de Assis Aragão

March 16 5	Novorizontino	0–2	São Paulo	Novo Horizonte
			Wagner Basílio 28'; Pianelli 29'	Stadium: Estádio Jorge Ismael de Biasi; Attendance: 7,241; Referee: Euclides Zamperetti Fiori

March 19 6	São Paulo	0–0	XV de Piracicaba	São Paulo
				Stadium: Estádio Cícero Pompeu de Toledo (Morumbi); Attendance: 1,473; Referee: José Renato de Oliveira Fidalgo

March 23 7	Internacional	0–0	São Paulo	Limeira
				Stadium: Estádio Municipal Major José Levy Sobrinho; Attendance: 9,123; Referee: Romualdo Arppi Filho

March 30 8	Santos	1–3	São Paulo	São Paulo
	Serginho 68'		Manu 19', 25', 31'	Stadium: Estádio Cícero Pompeu de Toledo (Morumbi); Attendance: 17,215; Referee: Ulisses Tavares da Silva Filho

April 2 9	São Paulo	1–2	Santo André	São Paulo
	Wagner Lopes 27'		Luiz Pereira 29'; Agnaldo 56'	Stadium: Estádio Cícero Pompeu de Toledo (Morumbi); Attendance: 3,017; Referee: Flávio de Carvalho

April 6 10	Palmeiras	1–1	São Paulo	São Paulo
	Mendonça 33'		Wagner Basílio 35'	Stadium: Estádio Cícero Pompeu de Toledo (Morumbi); Attendance: 20,006; Referee: Dulcídio Wanderley Boschilla

April 13 11	São Bento	1–0	São Paulo	Sorocaba
	Jones 9'			Stadium: Estádio Municipal Wálter Ribeiro; Attendance: 7,643; Referee: Ivo José da Costa Junior

April 16 12	Juventus	4–1	São Paulo	São Paulo
	Gatãozinho 13', 49'; Raudinei 24'; Claudinho 48'		Manu 84'	Stadium: Estádio Municipal Paulo Machado de Carvalho (Pacaembu); Attendance: 3,822; Referee: Antônio de Paula e Silva

April 20 13	XV de Jaú	0–1	São Paulo	Jaú
			Manu 64'	Stadium: Estádio Municipal José Magalhães de Almeida Prado; Attendance: 6,804; Referee: Euclides Peres Rodrigues

April 23 14	São Paulo	1–3	Mogi Mirim	São Paulo
	Wagner Basílio 85'		Bugrão 44', 49'; Henrique 71'	Stadium: Estádio Cícero Pompeu de Toledo (Morumbi); Attendance: 1,726; Referee: Valter Borges de Queiroz

April 27 15	Comercial	0–0	São Paulo	Ribeirão Preto
				Stadium: Estádio Doutor Francisco de Palma Travassos; Attendance: 7,272; Referee: Almir Ricci Peixoto Laguna

May 1 16	Paulista	0–2	São Paulo	Jundiaí
			Manu 82'; Pita 84'	Stadium: Estádio Municipal Doutor Jayme Pinheiro de Ulhôa Cintra; Attendance: 12,533; Referee: Ulisses Tavares da Silva Filho

May 4 17	São Paulo	4–1	Portuguesa	São Paulo
	Pita 8'; Pianelli 25'; Bernardo 46'; Manu 82'		Célio 78'	Stadium: Estádio Doutor Oswaldo Teixeira Duarte (Canindé); Attendance: 17,457; Referee: Valter Gabriel Mitre

May 10 18	São Paulo	2–2	Guarani	São Paulo
	Pianelli 31'; Manu 79'		Evair 26'; Neto 45'	Stadium: Estádio Cícero Pompeu de Toledo (Morumbi); Attendance: 4,681; Referee: Emídio Marques de Mesquita

May 17 19	Corinthians	1–1	São Paulo	São Paulo
	Cacau 42'		Manu 24'	Stadium: Estádio Municipal Paulo Machado de Carvalho (Pacaembu); Attendance: 17,455; Referee: Dulcídio Wanderley Boschillia

==== Second stage ====
Pos	Team	Pld	W	D	L	GF	GA	GD	Pts	Qualification or relegation
1	Inter de Limeira	19	11	6	2	28	13	+15	28	Qualified as stage winners
2	Palmeiras	19	8	8	3	26	12	+14	24	
3	Corinthians	19	10	4	5	22	15	+7	24	
4	América	19	5	13	1	11	5	+6	23	
5	Novorizontino	19	8	6	5	22	19	+3	22	
6	São Paulo	19	5	11	3	26	18	+8	21	

Updated to match(es) played on August 17, 1986. Source: RSSSF.com
Rules for classification: 1) points; 2) wins; 3) goal difference; 4) number of goals scored.

===== Matches =====
May 24 1	São Paulo	1–1	Novorizontino	São Paulo
	Pita 87'		Wilson Carrasco 21'	Stadium: Estádio Cícero Pompeu de Toledo (Morumbi); Attendance: 3,710; Referee: Euclides Peres Rodrigues

May 28 2	América	1–1	São Paulo	São José do Rio Preto
	Catanoce 44'		Pita 58'	Stadium: Estádio Mário Alves de Mendonça; Attendance: 6,611; Referee: Ulisses Tavares da Silva Filho

May 31 3	São Paulo	0–1	XV de Jaú	São Paulo
			Zé Carlos 86'	Stadium: Estádio Cícero Pompeu de Toledo (Morumbi); Attendance: 766; Referee: Osvaldo dos Santos Ramos

June 20 4	São Paulo	0–0	Juventus	São Paulo
				Stadium: Estádio Municipal Paulo Machado de Carvalho (Pacaembu); Attendance: 744; Referee: Antônio Carlos Saraiva

June 24 5	São Paulo	1–1	São Bento	São Paulo
	Marcelo 30'		Raimundinho 3'	Stadium: Estádio Cícero Pompeu de Toledo (Morumbi); Attendance: 389; Referee: Douglas Gonçalves Las Casas

June 28 6	Mogi Mirim	1–1	São Paulo	Mogi Mirim
	Bugrão 71'		Müller 77'	Stadium: Estádio Vail Chaves; Attendance: 11,489; Referee: Flávio de Carvalho

July 2 7	Botafogo	0–0	São Paulo	Ribeirão Preto
				Stadium: Estádio Santa Cruz; Attendance: 9,119; Referee: Antônio de Paula e Silva

July 6 8	Guarani	1–1	São Paulo	Campinas
	João Paulo Uberaba 87'		Müller 72'	Stadium: Estádio Brinco de Ouro da Princesa; Attendance: 7,431; Referee: José Carlos Gomes do Nascimento

July 9 9	São Paulo	4–5	Comercial	São Paulo
	Pita 32'; Müller 33'; Silas 60'; Bernardo 88'		Rômulo 4'; Souza 37'; Didi 70', 71'; Lucio 72'	Stadium: Estádio Cícero Pompeu de Toledo (Morumbi); Attendance: 2,726; Referee: José de Assis Aragão

July 13 10	Santos	1–2	São Paulo	São Paulo
	Paulo Leme 7'		Careca 18'; Pita 26'	Stadium: Estádio Urbano Caldeira (Vila Belmiro); Attendance: 21,133; Referee: Almir Ricci Peixoto Laguna

July 16 11	XV de Piracicaba	1–0	São Paulo	Piracicaba
	Amarildo 4'			Stadium: Estádio Municipal Barão da Serra Negra; Attendance: 11,161; Referee: Flávio de Carvalho

July 20 12	São Paulo	2–1	Corinthians	São Paulo
	Careca 17', 83'		Cristóvão 70'	Stadium: Estádio Cícero Pompeu de Toledo (Morumbi); Attendance: 22,582; Referee: Ulisses Tavares da Silva Filho

July 23 13	São Paulo	0–0	Paulista	São Paulo
				Stadium: Estádio Cícero Pompeu de Toledo (Morumbi); Attendance: 2.814; Referee: José de Assis Aragão

July 27 14	Palmeiras	1–5	São Paulo	São Paulo
	Nelsinho 83' (o.g.)		Careca 16'; Müller 33'; Silas 61', 63'; Sidney 81'	Stadium: Estádio Cícero Pompeu de Toledo (Morumbi); Attendance: 42,706; Referee: José Carlos Gomes do Nascimento

July 30 15	Santo André	1–1	São Paulo	Santo André
	Beto 55'		Pita 31'	Stadium: Estádio Municipal Bruno José Daniel; Attendance: 14,016; Referee: Dulcídio Wanderley Boschilla

August 2 16	Portuguesa	1–1	São Paulo	São Paulo
	Jorginho 82'		Careca 15'	Stadium: Estádio Cícero Pompeu de Toledo (Morumbi); Attendance: 9,051; Referee: Almir Ricci Peixoto Laguna

August 5 17	São Paulo	1–0	Ponte Preta	São Paulo
	Silas 42'			Stadium: Estádio Cícero Pompeu de Toledo (Morumbi); Attendance: 1,484; Referee: José de Assis Aragão

August 14 18	Ferroviária	0–0	São Paulo	São Paulo
				Stadium: Estádio Doutor Adhemar de Barros (Fonte Luminos); Attendance: 2,842; Referee: Emídio Marques de Mesquita

August 17 19	São Paulo	5–1	Internacional	São Paulo
	Careca 50', 61'; Müller 55', 65'; Manu 88'		Gílson Gênio 66'	Stadium: Estádio Cícero Pompeu de Toledo (Morumbi); Attendance: 1,094; Referee: Antônio de Paula e Silva

==== Record ====
Pos	Team	Pld	W	D	L	GF	GA	GD	Pts	Qualification or relegation
4	Portuguesa	38	16	11	11	52	37	+15	43	
5	Juventus	38	16	10	12	48	41	+7	42	
6	São Paulo	38	11	20	7	50	36	+14	42	
7	Santo André	38	11	17	10	26	35	−9	39	
8	Santos	38	15	8	15	43	44	−1	38	Qualified as stage winners

Updated to match(es) played on August 17, 1986. Source: RSSSF.com
Rules for classification: 1) points; 2) wins; 3) goal difference; 4) number of goals scored.

Final Position	Points	Matches	Wins	Draws	Losses	Goals For	Goals Away	Win%
6th	42	38	11	20	7	50	36	55%

=== Campeonato Brasileiro ===
==== First round ====
Pos	Team	Pld	W	D	L	GF	GA	GD	Pts
1	(São Paulo (state)) São Paulo	10	7	3	0	21	7	+14	17
2	(Rio Grande do Sul) Internacional	10	5	4	1	13	5	+8	14
3	(Pernambuco) Sport	10	5	3	2	11	6	+5	13
4	(Rio de Janeiro (state)) Fluminense	10	5	2	3	9	7	+2	12
5	(Rio de Janeiro (state)) Bangu	10	4	4	2	11	6	+5	12

===== Matches =====
30 August 1986 1	Coritiba	0–1	São Paulo	Curitiba
			Careca 12'	Stadium: Estádio Major Antônio do Couto Pereira; Attendance: 24,557; Referee: Arnaldo David Cezar Coelho

2 September 1986 2	Sobradinho	1–1	São Paulo	Brasília
	Tom Zé 82'		Zé Teodoro 88'	Stadium: Estádio Manoel Francisco dos Santos (Mané Garrincha); Attendance: 9,741; Referee: Pedro Carlos Bregalda

7 September 1986 3	São Paulo	1–1	Bangu	São Paulo
	Zé Teodoro 17'		João Cláudio 56'	Stadium: Estádio Cícero Pompeu de Toledo (Morumbi); Attendance: 13,552; Referee: Affonso Vítor de Oliveira

14 September 1986 4	São Paulo	4–0	Ceará	São Paulo
	Careca 40', 45'; Manu 72'; Bernardo 81'			Stadium: Estádio Cícero Pompeu de Toledo (Morumbi); Attendance: 15,877; Referee: Nei Andrade Nunesmaia

21 September 1986 5	São Paulo	0–0	Internacional	São Paulo
				Stadium: Estádio Cícero Pompeu de Toledo (Morumbi); Attendance: 20,407; Referee: Luís Carlos Félix

24 September 1986 6	São Paulo	4–0	Sampaio Corrêa	São Paulo
	Pereyra 2'; Careca 47'; Zé Teodoro 73'; Oscar 89'			Stadium: Estádio Cícero Pompeu de Toledo (Morumbi); Attendance: 7,121; Referee: Edson Alcântara do Amorim

28 September 1986 7	Fluminense	2–3	São Paulo	Rio de Janeiro
	Washington 64'; Ricardo Gomes 87'		Careca 1'; Pita 54'; Müller 74'	Stadium: Estádio Jornalista Mário Filho (Maracanã); Attendance: 12,964; Referee: Tito Rodrigues

30 September 1986 8	Operário	1–2	São Paulo	Campo Grande
	Fernando Roberto 68'		Careca 57'; Müller 86'	Stadium: Estádio Universitário Pedro Pedrossian (Morenão); Attendance: 19,235; Referee: José Roberto Ramiz Wright

2 October 1986 9	Remo	0–2	São Paulo	Belém
			Careca 4', 52'	Stadium: Estádio Alacid Nunes (Mangueirão); Attendance: 26,493; Referee: Manoel Amaro de Lima

5 October 1986 10	São Paulo	3–2	Sport	São Paulo
	Careca 64'; Silas 66'; Müller 90'		Edel 44'; Adílson 73'	Stadium: Estádio Cícero Pompeu de Toledo (Morumbi); Attendance: 21,495; Referee: Roberto Costa

==== Second stage ====
Pos	Team	Pld	W	D	L	GF	GA	GD	Pts
1	(São Paulo (state)) Palmeiras	16	7	8	1	22	11	+11	22
2	(São Paulo (state)) São Paulo	16	7	7	2	29	7	+22	21
3	(Santa Catarina (state)) Joinville	16	5	8	3	14	12	+2	18
4	(Rio de Janeiro (state)) America-RJ	16	5	8	3	14	14	0	18
5	(São Paulo (state)) Santos	16	3	9	4	9	10	−1	15

12 October 1986 1	Ponte Preta	0–2	São Paulo	Campinas
			Sidney 41'; Silas 74'	Stadium: Estádio Moisés Lucarelli; Attendance: 18,406; Referee: Valquir Pimentel

19 October 1986 2	São Paulo	2–0	Santos	São Paulo
	Silas 6'; Pita 62'			Stadium: Estádio Cícero Pompeu de Toledo (Morumbi); Attendance: 27,926; Referee: Arnaldo David Cezar Coelho

22 October 1986 3	São Paulo	2–0	Bangu	São Paulo
	Müller 17'; Careca 56'			Stadium: Estádio Cícero Pompeu de Toledo (Morumbi); Attendance: 10,824; Referee: Carlos Sergio Rosa Martins

26 October 1986 4	São Paulo	1–1	America-RJ	São Paulo
	Müller 21'		Luizinho Lemos 24'	Stadium: Estádio Cícero Pompeu de Toledo (Morumbi); Attendance: 33,952; Referee: Hélio Cosso

2 November 1986 5	São Paulo	0–0	Palmeiras	São Paulo
				Stadium: Estádio Cícero Pompeu de Toledo (Morumbi); Attendance: 60,638; Referee: Carlos Sergio Rosa Martins

9 November 1986 6	Joinville	0–0	São Paulo	Joinville
				Stadium: Estádio Ernesto Schlemm Sobrinho; Attendance: 19,115; Referee: Roberto Costa

12 November 1986 7	Treze	1–0	São Paulo	Campina Grande
	Dão 21'			Stadium: Estádio Governador Ernani Satyro (Amigão); Attendance: 21,925; Referee: Manuel Amaro de Lima

20 November 1986 8	São Paulo	5–0	Botafogo	São Paulo
	Careca 1', 42', 53'; Müller 16'; Silas 34'			Stadium: Estádio Cícero Pompeu de Toledo (Morumbi); Attendance: 9,572; Referee: Carlos Sergio Rosa Martins

23 November 1986 9	Santos	0–0	São Paulo	São Paulo
				Stadium: Estádio Cícero Pompeu de Toledo (Morumbi); Attendance: 32,706; Referee: Wilson Carlos dos Santos

30 November 1986 10	America-RJ	0–0	São Paulo	Niterói
				Stadium: Estádio Municipal Caio Martins; Attendance: 7,294; Referee: Carlos Sergio Rosa Martins

3 December 1986 11	São Paulo	4–1	Treze	São Paulo
	Careca 20'; Müller 24', 45', 78'		Bill 72'	Stadium: Estádio Cícero Pompeu de Toledo (Morumbi); Attendance: 6,106; Referee: Renato Marsiglia

7 December 1986 12	Botafogo	0–0	São Paulo	Rio de Janeiro
				Stadium: Estádio Jornalista Mário Filho (Maracanã); Attendance: 15,919; Referee: Nei Andrade Nunesmaia

10 December 1986 13	São Paulo	6–1	Ponte Preta	São Paulo
	Careca 20', 34'; Pita 28'; Silas 63', 73'; Bernardo 77'		Mauro 62'	Stadium: Estádio Cícero Pompeu de Toledo (Morumbi); Attendance: 8,832; Referee: Manoel Serapião Filho

14 December 1986 14	Palmeiras	2–2	São Paulo	São Paulo
	Edu Manga 36'; Mirandinha 75'		Nelsinho 6'; Silas 8'	Stadium: Estádio Cícero Pompeu de Toledo (Morumbi); Attendance: 68,213; Referee: José Roberto Ramiz Wright

24 January 1987 15	São Paulo	5–0	Joinville	São Paulo
	Müller 1'; Pita 21'; Careca 41', 58'; Sidney 68'			Stadium: Estádio Cícero Pompeu de Toledo (Morumbi); Attendance: 3,118; Referee: Arnaldo David Cezar Coelho

28 January 1987 16	Bangu	1–0	São Paulo	Rio de Janeiro
	Marcelinho 23'			Stadium: Estádio Proletário Guilherme da Silveira Filho (Moça Bonita); Attendance: 1,065; Referee: Tito Rodrigues

==== Eightfinals ====
February 1, 1987 Round of 16	Internacional-SP	2–1	São Paulo	Limeira
	João Batista 42'; Gilberto Costa 72'		Careca 56'	Stadium: Estádio Municipal Major José Levy Sobrinho; Attendance: 23,918; Referee: Wilson Carlos dos Santos

February 4, 1987 Round of 16	São Paulo	3–0	Internacional-SP	São Paulo
	Careca 1'; Silas 35', 55'			Stadium: Estádio Cícero Pompeu de Toledo (Morumbi); Attendance: 34,075; Referee: Luís Carlos Félix*; Aloísio Felisberto

==== Quarterfinals ====
February 8, 1987 Quarter-final	Fluminense	1–0	São Paulo	Rio de Janeiro
	Washington 2'			Stadium: Estádio Jornalista Mário Filho (Maracanã); Attendance: 50,669; Referee: Manoel Amaro de Lima

February 11, 1987 Quarter-final	São Paulo	2–0	Fluminense	São Paulo
	Careca 67', 77'			Stadium: Estádio Cícero Pompeu de Toledo (Morumbi); Attendance: 65,119; Referee: Carlos Sergio Rosa Martins

==== Semifinals ====
February 15, 1987 Semi-final	São Paulo	1–0	America-RJ	São Paulo
	Careca 79'			Stadium: Estádio Cícero Pompeu de Toledo (Morumbi); Attendance: 79,850; Referee: Carlos Sergio Rosa Martins

February 18, 1987 Semi-final	America-RJ	1–1	São Paulo	Rio de Janeiro
	Renato 72'		Careca 41'	Stadium: Estádio Jornalista Mário Filho (Maracanã); Attendance: 50,502; Referee: Carlos Sergio Rosa Martins

==== Final ====
February 22, 1987 Final	São Paulo	1–1	Guarani	São Paulo
	Careca 63'		Evair 60'	Stadium: Estádio Cícero Pompeu de Toledo (Morumbi); Attendance: 81,060; Referee: Carlos Rosa Martins

February 25, 1987 Final	Guarani	3–3 (a.e.t.) (4–4 agg.) (3–4 p)	São Paulo	Campinas
	Nelsinho 2' (o.g.); Boiadeiro 97'; João Paulo 106'		Bernardo 9'; Pita 91'; Careca 117'	Stadium: Estádio Brinco de Ouro; Attendance: 37,370; Referee: José de Assis Aragão
	Penalties
	Boiadeiro (penalty missed); Tosin (penalty scored); João Paulo (penalty missed); Waldir Carioca (penalty scored); Evair (penalty scored)		Careca (penalty missed); Darío Pereyra (penalty scored); Rômulo (penalty scored); Fonseca (penalty scored); Wagner Basílio (penalty scored)

==== Record ====
Final Position	Points	Matches	Wins	Draws	Losses	Goals For	Goals Away	Win%
1st	47	34	17	13	4	62	22	69%
