= 1977 Copa Libertadores finals =

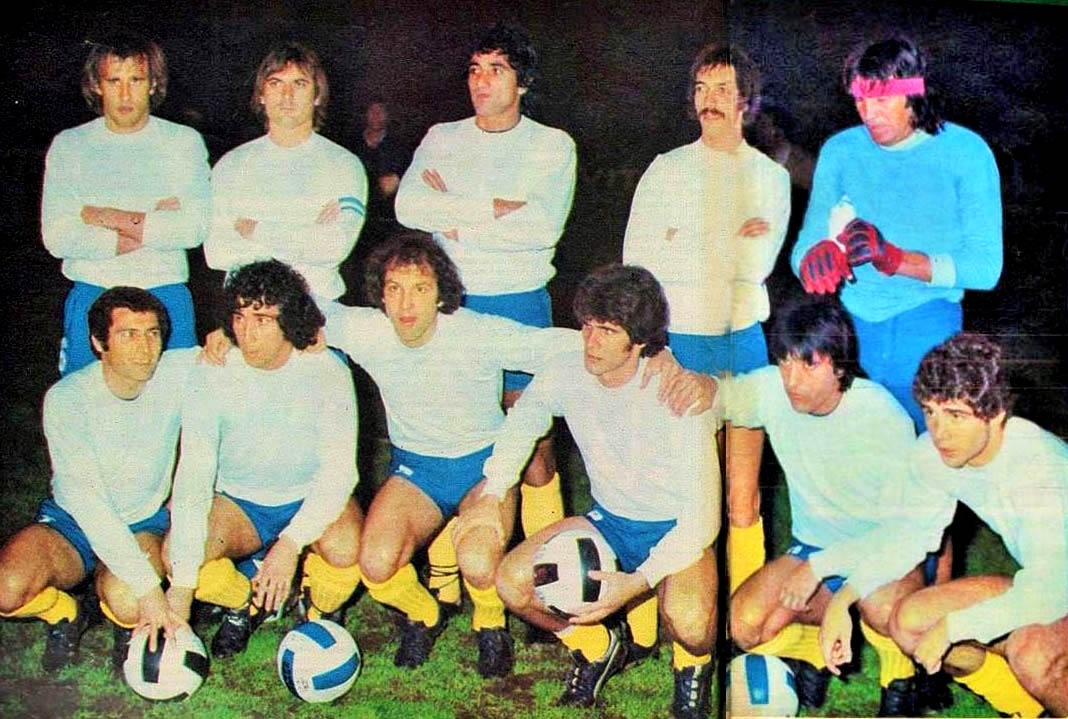
- Boca Juniors (in white shirt), champions
- Event: 1977 Copa Libertadores
Boca Juniors	Cruzeiro
(Argentina)	(Brazil)
- Tied 2–2 on points; after a playoff match, Boca Juniors won 5–4 on penalties

First leg
Boca Juniors	Cruzeiro
1	0
- Date: 6 September 1977
- Venue: Estadio Alberto J. Armando, Buenos Aires
- Referee: Roque Cerullo (Uruguay)
- Attendance: 60,000

Second leg
Cruzeiro	Boca Juniors
1	0
- Date: 11 September 1977
- Venue: Mineirão, Belo Horizonte
- Referee: César Orozco (Peru)
- Attendance: 80,000

Play-off
Cruzeiro	Boca Juniors
0	0
- After extra time
- Date: 14 September 1977
- Venue: Estadio Centenario, Montevideo
- Referee: Vicente Llobregat, (Venezuela)
- Attendance: 60,000

The 1977 Copa Libertadores finals was the final two-legged tie to determine the 1977 Copa Libertadores champion. It was contested by Argentine club Boca Juniors and Brazilian club Cruzeiro. The first leg of the tie was played on 6 September at Boca Juniors' home field, La Bombonera, while the second leg was played on 11 September at Cruzeiro's venue, Estadio Mineirão. It was Boca Juniors and Cruzeiro 2nd Copa Libertadores finals.

In the two-leg finals, both finalists won one game each. In the tie-breaking playoff, Boca Juniors won the series through a 5–4 penalty shootout at Montevideo's Estadio Centenario, therefore winning their first Copa Libertadores after the final lost in 1963 v. Santos.

== Qualified teams ==
Team	Previous finals app.
(Argentina) Boca Juniors	1963
(Brazil) Cruzeiro	**1976**

Bold indicates winning years

== Rules ==
The finals were played over two legs; home and away. The team that accumulated the most points —two for a win, one for a draw, zero for a loss— after the two legs would be crowned the champion. If the two teams tied on points after the second leg, a playoff in a neutral venue would become the next tie-breaker.

== Stadiums ==
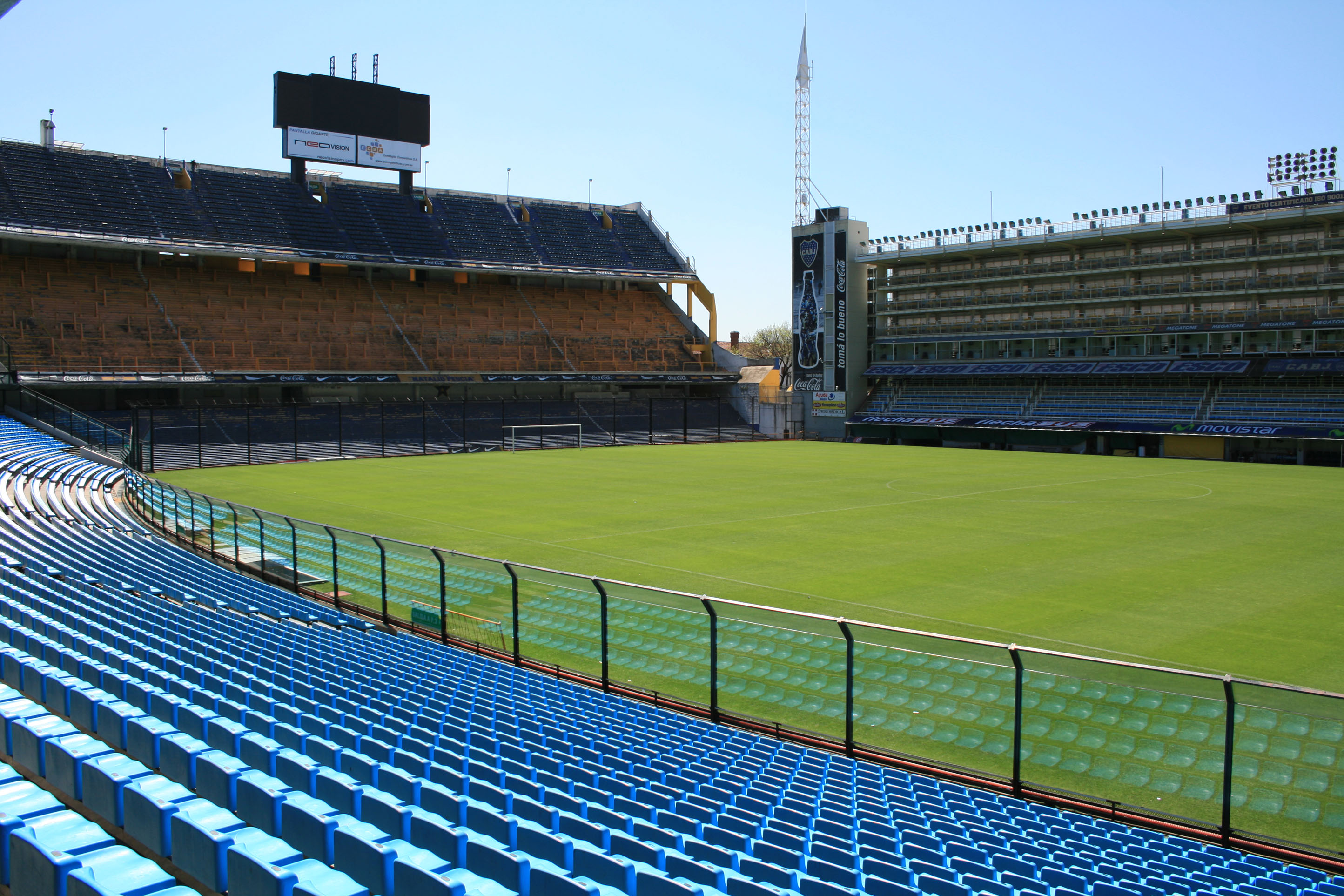
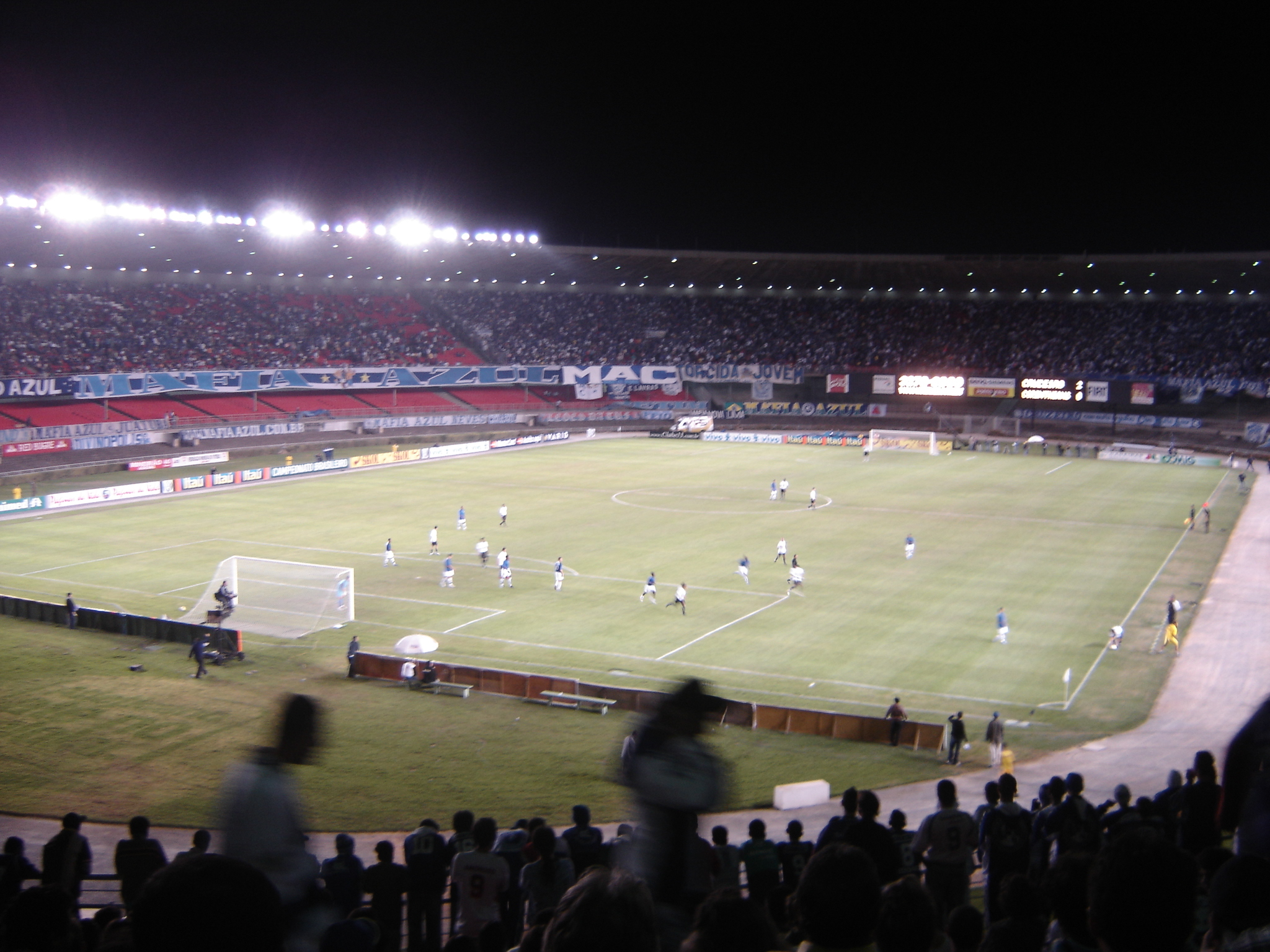
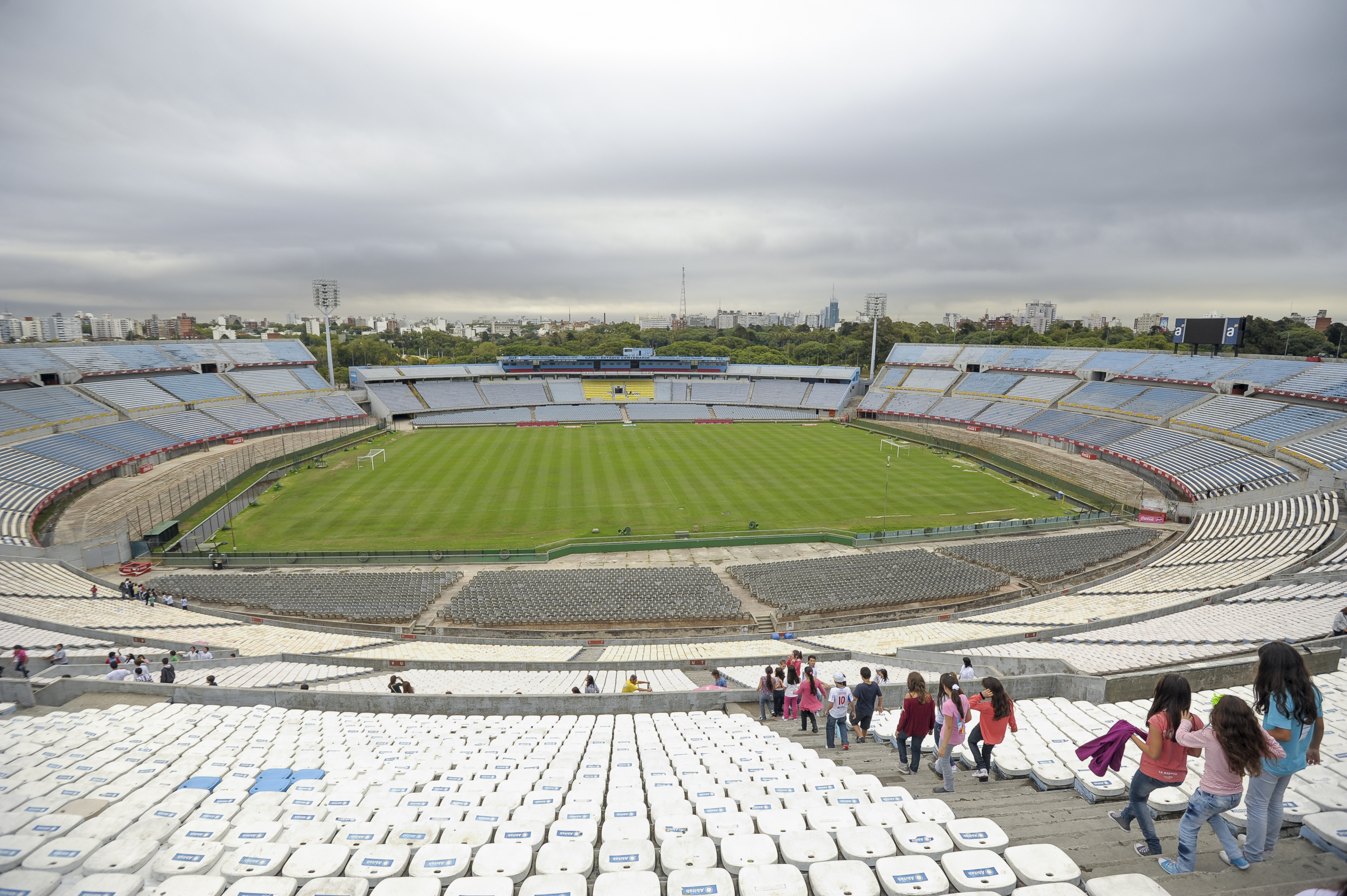
Fltr: La Bombonera, Mineirao and Estadio Centenario, venues for the series

== Road to the final ==
- Note: In all results below, the score of the finalist is given first (H: home; A: away).

(Argentina) Boca Juniors		Round	(Brazil) Cruzeiro	
Opponent	Result	Group stage	Opponent	Result
(Argentina) River Plate	1–0 (H)	Matchday 1	–	–
(Uruguay) Defensor Sporting	0–0 (A)	Matchday 2	–	–
(Uruguay) Peñarol	1–0 (A)	Matchday 3	–	–
(Uruguay) Defensor Sporting	2–0 (H)	Matchday 4	–	–
(Uruguay) Peñarol	1–0 (H)	Matchday 5	–	–
(Argentina) River Plate	0–0 (A)	Matchday 6	–	–
**Group 1 winners**: Team / Pld / W / D / L / GF / GA / GD / Pts; (Argentina) Boca Juniors / 6 / 4 / 2 / 0 / 5 / 0 / +5 / **10**; (Argentina) River Plate / 6 / 1 / 4 / 1 / 5 / 5 / 0 / **6**; (Uruguay) Defensor Sporting / 6 / 1 / 3 / 2 / 5 / 7 / -2 / **5**; (Uruguay) Peñarol / 6 / 1 / 1 / 4 / 7 / 10 / -3 / **3**		Final standings	As current champions, Cruzeiro started to compete directly in semifinals	
Opponent	Result	Semifinals	Opponent	Result
(Paraguay) Libertad	1–0 (H)	Matchday 1	(Brazil) Internacional	1–0 (A)
(Paraguay) Libertad	0–1 (A)	Matchday 1	(Venezuela) Portuguesa	4–0 (A)
(Colombia) Deportivo Cali	1–1 (H)	Matchday 3	(Brazil) Internacional	0–0 (H)
(Colombia) Deportivo Cali	1–1 (A)	Matchday 4	(Venezuela) Portuguesa	2–1 (H)
**Group A**: Team / Pld / W / D / L / GF / GA / GD / Pts; (Argentina) Boca Juniors / 4 / 2 / 2 / 0 / 4 / 2 / +2 / **6**; (Colombia) Deportivo Cali / 4 / 0 / 3 / 1 / 3 / 4 / -1 / **3**; (Paraguay) Libertad / 4 / 1 / 1 / 2 / 2 / 3 / -1 / **3**		final standings	**Group B**: Team / Pld / W / D / L / GF / GA / GD / Pts; (Brazil) Cruzeiro / 4 / 3 / 1 / 0 / 7 / 1 / +6 / **7**; (Brazil) Internacional / 4 / 1 / 1 / 2 / 2 / 5 / -3 / **3**; (Venezuela) Portuguesa / 4 / 1 / 0 / 3 / 5 / 8 / -3 / **2**	

== Match details ==
=== First leg ===
1977 Copa Libertadores finals
6 September 1977
First leg

Boca Juniors (Argentina)	1–0	(Brazil) Cruzeiro
Veglio 4'	Report

La Bombonera, Buenos Aires
Attendance: 60,000
Referee: Roque Cerullo (Uruguay)

**Boca Juniors**	**Cruzeiro**

GK	1	(Argentina) Hugo Gatti
DF	4	(Argentina) Vicente Pernía
DF	2	(Argentina) Francisco Sá	(substituted off) 59'
DF	6	(Argentina) Roberto Mouzo
DF	3	(Argentina) Alberto Tarantini
MF	9	(Argentina) Carlos Veglio
MF	5	(Argentina) Rubén Suñé (c)
MF	18	(Argentina) Mario Zanabria
FW	7	(Argentina) Ernesto Mastrángelo
FW	20	(Argentina) Daniel S. Pavón	(substituted off) 63'
FW	11	(Argentina) Darío Felman
Substitutes:
DF	14	(Argentina) José Luis Tesare	(substituted on) 59'
MF	17	(Argentina) Héctor Bernabitti	(substituted on) 63'
Manager:
(Argentina) Juan Carlos Lorenzo

GK	(Brazil) Raul
DF	(Brazil) Nelinho
DF	(Brazil) Darci (c)
DF	(Brazil) Morais
DF	(Brazil) Vanderlei
MF	(Brazil) Zé Carlos
MF	(Brazil) Eduardo
MF	(Brazil) Eli Carlos
FW	(Brazil) Eli Mendes
FW	(Brazil) Neca
FW	(Brazil) Joãozinho
Manager:
(Brazil) Yustrich

=== Second leg ===
11 September 1977
Second leg

Cruzeiro (Brazil)	1–0	(Argentina) Boca Juniors
Nelinho 76'	Report

Mineirão, Belo Horizonte
Attendance: 80,000
Referee: Orozco, (Peru)

**Cruzeiro**	**Boca Juniors**

GK	(Brazil) Raul
DF	(Brazil) Nelinho
DF	(Brazil) Morais
DF	(Brazil) Darci (c)
DF	(Brazil) Vanderlei
MF	(Brazil) Eli Carlos	(substituted off) 64'
MF	(Brazil) Eduardo
MF	(Brazil) Zé Carlos
FW	(Brazil) Eli Mendes
FW	(Brazil) Neca
FW	(Brazil) Joãozinho
Substitutes:
MF	(Brazil) Livio	(substituted on) 64'
Manager:
(Brazil) Yustrich

GK	1	(Argentina) Hugo Gatti
DF	4	(Argentina) Vicente Pernía
DF	14	(Argentina) José Luis Tesare
DF	6	(Argentina) Roberto Mouzo
DF	3	(Argentina) Alberto Tarantini
MF	10	(Argentina) Jorge Ribolzi
MF	5	(Argentina) Rubén Suñé (c)
MF	18	(Argentina) Mario Zanabria
FW	7	(Argentina) Ernesto Mastrángelo
FW	9	(Argentina) Carlos Veglio	(substituted off) 80'
FW	11	(Argentina) Darío Felman	(substituted off) 72'
Substitutes:
FW	20	(Argentina) Daniel S. Pavón	(substituted on) 80'
FW	25	(Argentina) Carlos Ortíz	(substituted on) 72'
Manager:
(Argentina) Juan Carlos Lorenzo

=== Playoff ===
14 September 1977
Playoff

Boca Juniors (Argentina)	0–0 (a.e.t.)	(Brazil) Cruzeiro
	Report
Penalties
Mouzo (penalty scored); Tesare (penalty scored); Zanabria (penalty scored); Pernía (penalty scored); Felman (penalty scored)	5–4	(penalty scored) Darci; (penalty scored) Neca; (penalty scored) Morais; (penalty scored) Livio; (penalty missed) Vanderlei

Estadio Centenario, Montevideo
Attendance: 60,000
Referee: Vicente Llobregat, (Venezuela)

**Boca Juniors**	**Cruzeiro**

GK	1	(Argentina) Hugo Gatti
DF	4	(Argentina) Vicente Pernía
DF	14	(Argentina) José Luis Tesare
DF	6	(Argentina) Roberto Mouzo
DF	3	(Argentina) Alberto Tarantini
MF	8	(Argentina) Jorge Benítez	(substituted off) 72'
MF	5	(Argentina) Rubén Suñé (c)
MF	18	(Argentina) Mario Zanabria
FW	7	(Argentina) Ernesto Mastrángelo
FW	9	(Argentina) Carlos Veglio
FW	11	(Argentina) Darío Felman
Substitutes:
DF	10	(Argentina) Jorge Ribolzi	(substituted on) 72' (substituted off) 90'
MF	20	(Argentina) Daniel S. Pavón	(substituted on) 90'
Manager:
(Argentina) Juan Carlos Lorenzo

GK	(Brazil) Raul
DF	(Brazil) Nelinho	(substituted off) 60'
DF	(Brazil) Darci (c)
DF	(Brazil) Morais
DF	(Brazil) Vanderlei
MF	(Brazil) Zé Carlos
MF	(Brazil) Eduardo
MF	(Brazil) Eli Carlos	(substituted off) 46'
FW	(Brazil) Eli Mendes
FW	(Brazil) Neca
FW	(Brazil) Joãozinho
Substitutes:
MF	(Brazil) Livio	(substituted on) 46'
DF	(Brazil) Mariano	(substituted on) 60'
Manager:
(Brazil) Yustrich

== Notes ==
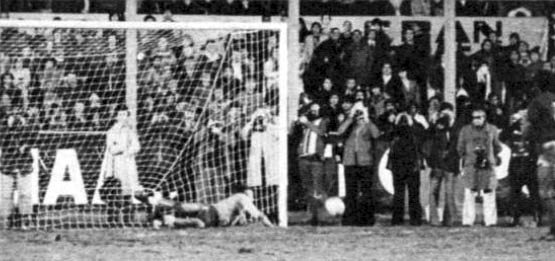
Hugo Gatti stops the last penalty kick, allowing Boca Juniors to win Copa Libertadores

Once the playoff extra time finished, Venezuelan referee Vicente Llobregat did not allow Boca Juniors coaching staff to enter the pitch to talk with the men chosen to kick the penalties. Therefore manager Juan Carlos Lorenzo took pen and paper to write the names of players designed to kick, they were Pernía, Tesare, Zanabria, Felman and Mouzo. On the bottom, he wrote the word "abajo" (down) to indicate them where to shoot.

Because of coaching staffs were not allowed to enter the field, one of the ball boys gave the paper to captain Rubén Suñé, then the players ordering themselves to kick the penalties.

Look, I'm gonna be sincere to you because I'm not in the mood for jokes. The ball impacted on me. I moved and the ball impacted on me. Vanderley shot directly to my left side and we won the cup. It was the destiny.

— Hugo Gatti, who stopped the last penalty that allowed Boca Juniors to win the Copa Libertadores for the first time in its history
