= Romulo =

Romulo may refer to:

== People with the given name Romulo ==
=== Italian ===
- Rômulo (footballer, born 1987), Brazilian-born football player
- Romulo Cincinato (1502 – circa 1593), painter

=== Portuguese ===
- Rómulo (footballer, born 1976), football player

=== Mexican ===
- Rómulo Díaz de la Vega, interim president of Mexico in 1855
- Rómulo O'Farrill (1917–2006), businessman

=== Argentinian ===
- Rómulo Berruti (1937–2026), Argentine journalist
- Rómulo Antonio Braschi (born 1941), independent Catholic bishop
- Rómulo García (1927–2005), Roman Catholic Archbishop
- Rómulo Macció (1931–2016), painter
- Rómulo Sebastián Naón (1875–1941), Ambassador to the United States

=== Venezuelan ===
- Rómulo Betancourt (1908–1981), 47th and 54th president of Venezuela
- Rómulo Gallegos (1884–1969), novelist
  - Rómulo Gallegos Prize, a literary award named in Gallegos' honor
  - Rómulo Gallegos Municipality (disambiguation), several places in Venezuela
  - Rómulo Gallegos Center for Latin American Studies, a cultural studies foundation
- Rómulo Guardia (born 1961), film producer
- Rómulo Sánchez (born 1984), professional baseball player

=== Guatemalan ===
- Rómulo Méndez (born 1938), retired football referee

=== Peruvian ===
- Rómulo León (fl. 1988–1989), politician
- Rómulo Pizarro (born 1955), Peruvian politician

=== Brazilian ===
- Rômulo (footballer, born 1960), football player
- Rômulo (footballer, born 1982), football player
- Rômulo (footballer, born 1990), football player
- Rômulo (footballer, born 1996), football player
- Rômulo (footballer, born 2001), football player
- Rômulo Cardoso (born 2002), football player
- Rômulo Marques Macedo (born 1980), football player
- Rômulo Noronha (born 1987), football player
- Rômulo Cabral Pereira Pinto (born 1991), football player
- Romulo Pires (born 1983), male model
- Rômulo José Pacheco da Silva (born 1995), football player
- Rômulo Eugênio Togni (born 1982), football player
- Micão, nickname to Rômulo da Silva (born 1980), football player

=== Filipino ===
- Romulo Neri (born 1950), politician
- Romulo Valles (born 1951), archbishop

== People with the surname Romulo ==
- Alberto Romulo (born 1933), Filipino politician
- Bernadette Romulo-Puyat (born 1971), Filipina government administrator
- Carlos P. Romulo (1898–1985), Filipino diplomat, politician, soldier, journalist and author
