= Éder Taino =

Brazilian footballer

Personal information
- Full name: Éder Canavesi Taino
- Date of birth: 18 November 1960 (age 65)
- Place of birth: Taubaté, Brazil
- Position: Right back

Youth career
- –1980: Taubaté

Senior career*
Years	Team	Apps	(Gls)
1980–1984	Taubaté		
1982	→ Matsubara (loan)		
1985–1987	São Paulo	76	(2)
1988	Atlético Paranaense		
1989	Taquaritinga		
1990	Francana		
1991	EC Lemense		
1992	Tuna Luso		
1993–1994	Grêmio Maringá		
1995	Atlético Sorocaba		
- * Club domestic league appearances and goals as of 9 October 2023

Éder Taino (born 18 November 1960), is a Brazilian former professional footballer who played as a right back.

== Career ==
A standout from EC Taubaté, he arrived at São Paulo FC, where he played with Zé Teodoro on the right back until the Brazilian title campaign in 1986. He played for several other clubs until retiring at Atlético Sorocaba in 1995.

== Personal life ==
After retiring, he became an employee of Volkswagen.

== Honours ==
São Paulo

- Campeonato Brasileiro: 1986
- Campeonato Paulista: 1985, 1987
