= Pianelli =

Pianelli is an Italian surname. Notable people with the surname include:

- José Eduardo Pianelli (born 1963), Brazilian footballer
- Guillaume Pianelli (born 1998), French soccer player
- Vittorio Rossi Pianelli (1875–1953), Italian stage and film actor and director.

== See also ==
- Pianello (disambiguation)
