= Manu (footballer, born 1966) =

Brazilian footballer

Personal information
- Full name: João Manuel Rocha Monteiro Corrêa
- Date of birth: 8 April 1966 (age 60)
- Place of birth: Brasília, Brazil
- Position: Forward

Youth career
- –1986: São Paulo

Senior career*
Years	Team	Apps	(Gls)
1986–1990	São Paulo	76	(14)
1987	→ Internacional (loan)		
1988	→ Juventus-SP (loan)		
1988	→ Bangu (loan)		
1989	→ América de Natal (loan)		
1991–1996	União da Madeira		
1995	→ Chaves (loan)		
1996	→ Espinho (loan)		
1997–1999	Académico de Viseu		
1998	→ Imortal (loan)		
2000	São José-RS		
- * Club domestic league appearances and goals as of 13 October 2023

João Manuel Rocha Monteiro Corrêa (born 8 April 1966), better known as Manu, is a Brazilian former professional footballer who played as a forward.

== Career ==
Revealed in the youth sectors of São Paulo FC, he was Brazilian champion and São Paulo champion for the club. After being loaned out a few times, he transferred to Portuguese football, at União da Madeira, where he played most of his career. His last club before retiring was EC São José de Porto Alegre.

== Honours ==
São Paulo

- Campeonato Brasileiro: 1986
- Campeonato Paulista: 1987

União da Madeira

- Taça da Madeira: 1992–93
