= Fonseca (footballer, born 1966) =

Brazilian footballer

Personal information
- Full name: Antônio João da Fonseca
- Date of birth: 11 April 1966 (age 60)
- Place of birth: Taguaí, Brazil
- Position: Defender

Youth career
- –1984: XV de Jaú

Senior career*
Years	Team	Apps	(Gls)
1984	XV de Jaú		
1984–1989	São Paulo	125	(3)
1989–1992	União São João		
1992–1993	Ferroviária		
1993	→ Anapolina (loan)		
1994	Joinville		
1994	XV de Jaú		
1996	Botafogo-SP		
1998	Ferroviária		
1999	Brusque		
- * Club domestic league appearances and goals as of 26 September 2023

Antônio João da Fonseca (born 11 April 1966), simply known as Fonseca, is a Brazilian former professional footballer who played as a defender.

== Career ==
He started on the right back of XV de Jaú. At São Paulo FC, he stood out for his enormous versatility, capable of playing at any point in the defensive sector. Fonseca took one of the decisive penalties that gave the club the 1986 Campeonato Brasileiro title.

== Honours ==
São Paulo

- Campeonato Paulista: 1985, 1987
- Campeonato Brasileiro: 1986
