= Daniel Nogueira =

Brazilian footballer

Daniel
Personal information
- Full name: Daniel Nogueira
- Date of birth: 29 September 1958 (age 68)
- Place of birth: Guaratinguetá, Brazil
- Position: Left back

Youth career
- AA Orlândia

Senior career*
Years	Team	Apps	(Gls)
1978–1980	Orlândia		
1981–1990	América-SP		
1986–1987	→ São Paulo (loan)		
1990–1993	Matonense		
- * Club domestic league appearances and goals as of 29 November 2023

Daniel Nogueira (born 29 September 1958), is a Brazilian former professional footballer who played as a left back.

== Career ==
A full-back for América de Rio Preto for more than a decade, he was loaned to São Paulo FC, for the final stretch of the 1986 Brazilian Championship, thus being part of the champion squad.

== Honours ==
São Paulo

- Campeonato Brasileiro: 1986

América

- Torneio José Maria Marín: 1987
