= Eli Mendes =

Brazilian footballer

Personal information
- Full name: Eli Mendes
- Date of birth: 21 February 1952 (age 74)
- Place of birth: Corinto, Brazil
- Positions: Attacking midfielder; forward

Senior career*
Years	Team	Apps	(Gls)
1969–1970	Usipa		
1970–1974	América-MG		
1974–1979	Cruzeiro	143	(17)
1979	Uberlândia		
1980–1981	América-MG		
1981–1984	Volta Redonda	90	(18)
1984–1985	Operário-MS		
1986–1988	Fabril		
- * Club domestic league appearances and goals as of 26 January 2024

Eli Mendes (born 21 February 1952), is a Brazilian former professional footballer who played as an attacking midfielder and forward.

== Career ==
Midfielder and forward, Eli Mendes started his career at Usipa de Ipatinga. He also played for América Mineiro and in 1974, arrived at Cruzeiro, where he made 143 appearances and scored 17 goals. He became Eli Mendes since there was another Eli at Cruzeiro (Eli Carlos, Paulo Silas elder brother), and he was part of the winning squad of the 1976 Copa Libertadores. He also had a long spell at Volta Redonda FC from 1981 to 1984, playing in 90 matches and scoring 18 goals.

== Honours ==
América Mineiro

- Campeonato Mineiro: 1971

Cruzeiro

- Copa Libertadores: 1976
- Campeonato Mineiro: 1974, 1975, 1977
