= Pianello (disambiguation) =

Pianello may refer to:

- Pianello, commune in the Haute-Corse department of France on the island of Corsica
- Pianello del Lario, municipality in the Province of Como in the Italian region Lombardy
- Pianello Val Tidone, municipality in the Province of Piacenza in the Italian region Emilia-Romagna

== See also ==
- Pianelli
