= Paulo Pereira (footballer) =

Brazilian footballer (born 1965)

Personal information
- Full name: Paulo António do Prado Pereira
- Date of birth: 27 August 1965 (age 61)
- Place of birth: Campinas, Brazil
- Height: 1.86 m (6 ft 1 in)
- Position: Defender

Senior career*
Years	Team	Apps	(Gls)
1985–1987	São Bento		
1987–1988	Monterrey	19	(3)
1988–1994	Porto	88	(15)
1992–1993	→ Vitória Guimarães (loan)	19	(2)
1994–1996	Benfica	19	(2)
1996–1998	Genoa	46	(2)
1998–1999	Reggiana	8	(0)
2000	Bragantino		
Total		199	(24)

Managerial career
- 2008–2009: Avaí (assistant)
- 2010: Grêmio (assistant)
- 2010: Flamengo (assistant)
- 2011–2012: Guarani (assistant)
- 2013: Náutico (assistant)
- 2012–2013: América (assistant)
- 2014: Portuguesa (assistant)
- * Club domestic league appearances and goals

Paulo António do Prado Pereira (born 27 August 1965) is a Brazilian retired footballer who played as a defender.

Over the course of 8 seasons, he amassed Primeira Liga totals of 126 games, and 19 goals, mainly at Porto, but also representing rivals Benfica, winning seven titles between them.

== Career ==
Born in Campinas, Pereira career started at Esporte Clube São Bento, competing exclusively in the regional league, Campeonato Paulista, and never finish higher than ninth. After three years at Bentão, he moved to the Mexican league, joining Monterrey for the 1987-88 season.

In 1988, he moved to the Portuguese league, joining FC Porto and debuting on 7 January 1989 in an away loss to Boavista. In the five seasons he spent with the Dragons, he won two league titles and three Portuguese Cup's, partnering with Geraldão as a centre-back in his early days, but later moving to the right with the arrival of Aloísio and Fernando Couto.

With his influence diminished, he spent one season on loan to Vitória S.C., and only added 11 league appearances in the last season. In December 1994, the 30-year-old moved to rivals Benfica, reuniting with former Porto manager, Artur Jorge. He debuted on 5 February 1995, in a home win against União da Madeira, and scored his only two goals with them in the following match-days, on 12 February and 19 February. He was mainly used as a centre-back, alongside Hélder or Mozer, but his importance gradually dwelled and on the summer of 1996, he transferred to Genoa.

With the Italian team was competing in the second division, Pereira added nearly fifty league caps, helping the club almost gain promotion for the Serie A in his first year. After two seasons with the Griffins, he moved to Reggina, succeeding on getting the club promoted in his only season there.

In 2008, Pereira started working as an assistant manager, often with his brother as main coach, passing through several clubs, the most known being Grêmio and Flamengo.

== Personal life ==
He is the young brother of the footballer Eli Carlos, and the twin brother of Brazilian international Paulo Silas.

== Honours ==
Porto

- Primeira Liga: 1989–90, 1991–92
- Taça de Portugal: 1990–91, 1993–94
- Supertaça Cândido de Oliveira: 1991, 1992

Benfica

- Taça de Portugal: 1995–96
