= Rômulo (footballer, born 1960) =

Brazilian footballer

Personal information
- Full name: Rômulo Silva Pinto
- Date of birth: 23 September 1960 (age 66)
- Place of birth: Belo Horizonte, Brazil
- Positions: Attacking midfielder; forward

Youth career
- Atlético Mineiro

Senior career*
Years	Team	Apps	(Gls)
1979–1983	Atlético Mineiro	96	(17)
1981	→ América-SP (loan)		
1984	Guarani		
1984–1985	Vasco da Gama		
1986–1987	São Paulo	9	(0)
1992	Caxias		
1993	Brasil de Farroupilha		
1994	Campinense		
- * Club domestic league appearances and goals as of 29 November 2023

Rômulo Silva Pinto (born 23 September 1960), simply known as Rômulo, is a Brazilian former professional footballer who played as an attacking midfielder and forward.

== Career ==
Rômulo played for Atlético Mineiro from 1979 to 1983, being Minas Gerais champion four times. For the club, he played 96 matches and scored 17 goals. For São Paulo FC where he was part of the Brazilian champion squad in 1986 and the state championship in 1987. Rômulo took one of the penalties in the 1986 decision against Guarani.

== Honours ==
Atlético Mineiro

- Campeonato Mineiro: 1979, 1980, 1982, 1983
- Taça Minas Gerais: 1979

São Paulo

- Campeonato Brasileiro: 1986
- Campeonato Paulista: 1987
