= Lê (footballer, born 1964) =

Brazilian footballer

Personal information
- Full name: Ronaldo Francisco Lucato
- Date of birth: 1 September 1964 (age 62)
- Place of birth: Limeira, Brazil
- Height: 1.72 m (5 ft 8 in)
- Position: Striker

Youth career
- –1984: Inter de Limeira

Senior career*
Years	Team	Apps	(Gls)
1984–1987	Inter de Limeira		
1987–1988	São Paulo	103	(24)
1989–1991	Portuguesa	93	(20)
1991–1992	Internacional		
1992	Ituano		
1992–1993	Santa Cruz		
1993	Atlético Mineiro		
1994–1996	Otsuka Pharmaceutical		
- * Club domestic league appearances and goals

Ronaldo Francisco Lucato (born 1 September 1964), simply known as Lê is a Brazilian former professional footballer who played as a striker.

== Career ==
Born in Limeira, he started at AA Internacional, where in 1986 he was a great highlight in the unexpected state title. With coach Pepe going to São Paulo, he was appointed to the club. In 1989 Lê was sold to Portuguesa de Desportos, making it the first transaction involving a football player that reached the value of millions in Brazilian currency.

== Personal life ==
He is currently a player agent.

== Honours ==
Inter de Limeira

- Campeonato Paulista: 1986

São Paulo

- Campeonato Paulista: 1987

Internacional

- Campeonato Gaúcho: 1992
