= Paulo Silas =

Brazilian footballer & manager (born 1965)

Silas
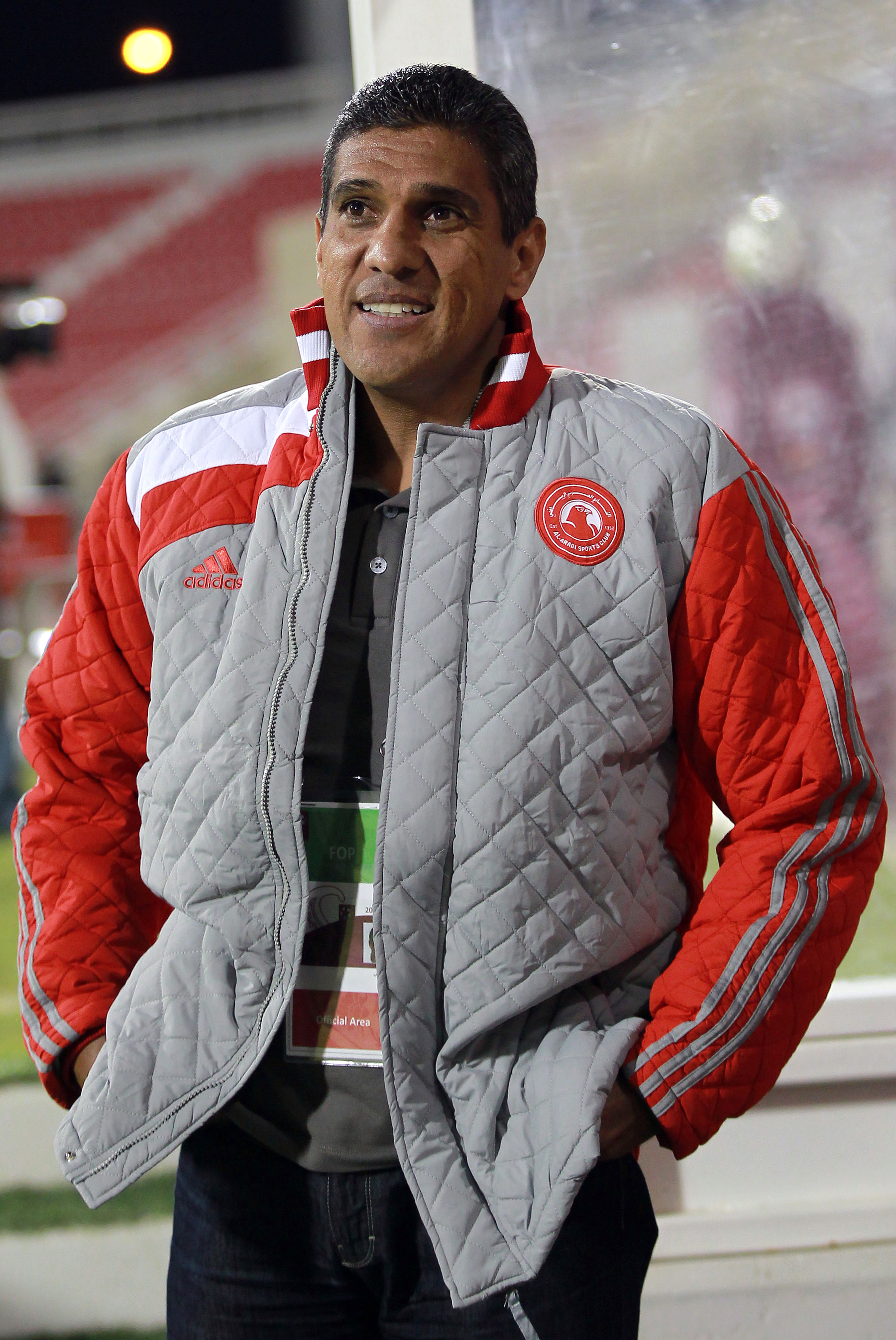
- Paulo Silas with Al Arabi, prior to a Qatar Stars League game

Personal information
- Full name: Paulo Silas do Prado Pereira
- Date of birth: 27 August 1965 (age 61)
- Place of birth: Campinas, Brazil
- Height: 1.78 m (5 ft 10 in)
- Position: Central midfielder

Youth career
- 1980–1984: São Paulo

Senior career*
Years	Team	Apps	(Gls)
1984–1988	São Paulo	55	(16)
1988–1990	Sporting CP	47	(11)
1990	Central Español	2	(3)
1990–1991	Cesena	26	(3)
1991–1992	Sampdoria	31	(3)
1992–1993	Internacional	51	(18)
1994–1995	Vasco da Gama	23	(2)
1995–1997	San Lorenzo	95	(24)
1997	São Paulo	16	(2)
1998–1999	Kyoto Purple Sanga	56	(11)
2000	Atlético Paranaense	20	(1)
2001	Rio Branco-SP	20	(0)
2001	Ituano	5	(0)
2001–2002	América Mineiro		
2002	Portuguesa		
2003–2004	Inter de Limeira		

International career
1985	Brazil U-20		
1986–1992	Brazil	34	(1)

Managerial career
- 2007: Fortaleza
- 2008–2009: Avaí
- 2010: Grêmio
- 2010: Flamengo
- 2011: Avaí
- 2011–2012: Al-Arabi
- 2012: Al-Gharafa
- 2013: Náutico
- 2013–2014: América-MG
- 2014: Portuguesa
- 2015: Ceará
- 2016: Avaí
- 2017: Novorizontino
- 2017: Red Bull Brasil
- 2019: Atlético Tubarão
- 2019: São Bento
- * Club domestic league appearances and goals

Paulo Silas do Prado Pereira (born 27 August 1965), also known as Paulo Silas, Silas Pereira or simply Silas, is a Brazilian football pundit, coach, and former professional player.

In his playing career as a central midfielder, he broke through at São Paulo in the mid-1980s, before playing for Sporting CP in Portugal, Cesena and Sampdoria in Italy, and San Lorenzo in Argentina among others. After winning South American and world titles with the under-20 team in 1985, he earned 34 caps for Brazil between 1986 and 1992. He was chosen for the FIFA World Cup in 1986 and 1990 and the Copa América in 1987 and 1989, winning the latter.

Silas began working as a manager in 2007, and led Avaí in three spells, including their best Campeonato Brasileiro Série A finish of 6th in 2009. He briefly managed Grêmio and Flamengo in the same league the following year, and Al-Arabi and Al-Gharafa of the Qatar Stars League.

== Personal life ==
Silas was born in Campinas, São Paulo, Brazil. The Portuguese footballer Silas, who was a youth player at Sporting CP when the Brazilian was a first team player, took his nickname from his resemblance to him. He is the young brother of the also footballer Eli Carlos, and twin brother of Paulo Pereira.

== Club career ==
During his playing career from 1984 to 2003 he played in Brazil, Portugal, Uruguay, Argentina, Japan and Italy at São Paulo, Internacional, Vasco da Gama, Atlético Paranaense, Rio Branco de Americana, Ituano, América Mineiro, Portuguesa, Internacional de Limeira, Sporting Lisbon, San Lorenzo de Almagro, Central Español, Kyoto Purple Sanga, A.C. Cesena and U.C. Sampdoria.

Silas scored the opening goal on his Sporting debut on 21 August 1988, a 2–1 win away to Leixões on the first day of the Primeira Liga season; of his 14 goals in 52 games for the team from Lisbon, this was the only header. On 5 October that year in the first round of the UEFA Cup, he netted in a 2–1 win away to Ajax in Amsterdam (6–3 aggregate).

Silas played his last game for Sporting on 25 March 1990, scoring in a 2–1 loss to rivals Benfica in the Estádio da Luz. Amidst the club's financial crisis, they were unable to pay his insurance, leaving him unable to complete the season; the issue was covered up by an ankle injury he suffered for Brazil against England.

== International career ==
In 1985, Silas was part of the Brazil under-20 team that won the South American Championship and the FIFA World Youth Championship.

Silas made his international debut for Brazil on 16 March 1986 in a 3–0 friendly loss away to Hungary. He went to the 1986 FIFA World Cup in Mexico, where he made late substitute appearances in the last 16 win over Poland and the penalty shootout elimination by France in the quarter-finals. At the 1987 Copa América, he played once against Venezuela in a group-stage exit; he played five games of the 1989 edition victory on home soil.

On 20 August 1989, Silas scored his only international goal in a 6–0 win over Venezuela in 1990 FIFA World Cup qualification at the Estádio do Morumbi. He made three appearances off the bench, including the 1–0 loss to rivals Argentina in the last 16.

== Coaching career ==
=== Avaí ===
Silas was assistant to Zetti at Paraná and Fortaleza, and succeeded him at the latter for his first job in management in November 2007. The following March, he was signed by Avaí, who had previously been linked with Zetti. He led the newly promoted club from Santa Catarina to a best-ever sixth place in the 2009 Campeonato Brasileiro Série A.

=== Grêmio ===
In December 2009, Silas was hired by Grêmio. He won the Campeonato Gaúcho state title in 2010 against his former club Internacional, but said that his team were not ready for the national league. Also in May, his team made the Copa do Brasil semi-finals, losing 6–5 on aggregate to Santos. He was dismissed on 8 August after taking two wins from 13 games in that championship to leave the team in 18th; a goalless draw in the Grenal derby against Inter had saved his job a week earlier.

=== Flamengo ===
On 29 August 2010, Silas was hired by Flamengo on a one-year deal. He replaced Rogério Lourenço, and got the job instead of 1994 FIFA World Cup-winning manager Carlos Alberto Parreira. He was hired by the club's director Zico in his hometown of Campinas, where Flamengo had travelled to play Guarani.

Silas' debut on 1 September 2010 was a 1–0 loss away to Cruzeiro. He was dismissed on 4 October having won once and drawn six times in ten games, leaving the team in 15th. After his penultimate game, he publicly criticised defender Jean for scoring an own goal in a 1–1 draw at Goiás.

=== Qatar ===
Silas returned to Avaí in February 2011. After losing all three of the first games of the national season, he left by his own accord for Al-Arabi in the Qatar Stars League. In March 2012, he moved to Al-Gharafa in the same league, winning 4–1 on his debut the following day against Al Ahli with two goals by compatriot Diego Tardelli.

Having won the Emir of Qatar Cup in the less than three months of his initial contract with the club, Silas signed a new one-year deal in June 2012. On 27 November, he terminated his deal so he could look at offers from other Middle Eastern or Brazilian clubs.

=== Return to Brazil ===
Silas returned to Brazil in a 45-day spell at Naútico ending on 2 June 2013. His debut was an elimination from the Copa do Brasil by CRAC-GO, followed by elimination from the Campeonato Pernambucano semi-finals by Santa Cruz and taking one point from three games at the start of the Série A season.

In September 2013, Silas was hired at América Mineiro in the Campeonato Brasileiro Série B. The following 10 February, he was dismissed after a defeat to Belo Horizonte rivals Cruzeiro left the club second-from-bottom in a season that they were aiming for the Campeonato Mineiro title. He then had a seven-game spell at Portuguesa in Série B, winning once and drawing twice before his termination on 11 September.

Silas was hired by Ceará on 13 February 2015. His team reached the final of the Campeonato Cearense, losing 4–3 on aggregate to his former employers Fortaleza, but won the Copa do Nordeste. He left by mutual accord on 27 June after winning once and drawing twice in the first nine games of the Série B season.

At the end of March 2016, Silas signed for a third spell at Avaí, tasked with taking them back to the top division. His tenure ended on 20 August, with the team in 15th place after 28 games.

In September 2019, Silas became a pundit for ESPN Brasil.

== Career statistics ==
=== Club ===
Club performance			League		Cup		League Cup		Total	
Season	Club	League	Apps	Goals	Apps	Goals	Apps	Goals	Apps	Goals
Brazil			League		Copa do Brasil		League Cup		Total	
1985	São Paulo	Série A	11	3					11	3
1986	São Paulo	Série A	33	9					33	9
1987	São Paulo	Série A	13	5					13	5
1988	São Paulo	Série A	0	0					0	0
Portugal			League		Taça de Portugal		Taça da Liga		Total	
1988–89	Sporting Portugal	Primeira Liga	35	8					35	8
1989–90	Sporting Portugal	Primeira Liga	12	3					12	3
Uruguay			League		Cup		League Cup		Total	
1990	Central Español	Primera División	3	2					3	2
Italy			League		Coppa Italia		League Cup		Total	
1990–91	Cesena	Serie A	26	3					26	3
1991–92	Sampdoria	Serie A	31	3					31	3
Brazil			League		Copa do Brasil		League Cup		Total	
1992	Internacional	Série A	0	0					0	0
1993	Internacional	Série A	0	0					0	0
1993	Vasco da Gama	Série A	6	0					6	0
Argentina			League		Cup		League Cup		Total	
1993–94	San Lorenzo Almagro	Primera División	8	5					8	5
1994–95	San Lorenzo Almagro	Primera División	35	7					35	7
1995–96	San Lorenzo Almagro	Primera División	23	3					23	3
1996–97	San Lorenzo Almagro	Primera División	25	9					25	9
1997–98	San Lorenzo Almagro	Primera División	4	0					4	0
Brazil			League		Copa do Brasil		League Cup		Total	
1997	São Paulo	Série A	5	0					5	0
Japan			League		Emperor's Cup		J.League Cup		Total	
1998	Kyoto Purple Sanga	J1 League	30	5	2	1	2	0	34	6
1999	Kyoto Purple Sanga	J1 League	26	6	2	0	4	3	32	9
Brazil			League		Copa do Brasil		League Cup		Total	
2000	Atlético Paranaense	Série A	20	0					20	0
2001	América-MG	Série A	6	0					6	0
Country	Brazil		94	17					94	17
Country	Portugal		47	11					47	11
Country	Uruguay		2	3					2	3
Country	Italy		57	6					57	6
Country	Argentina		95	24					95	24
Country	Japan		56	11	4	1	6	3	66	15
Total			351	72	4	1	6	3	361	76

=== International ===
Brazil national team
Year	Apps	Goals
1986	5	0
1987	5	0
1988	0	0
1989	16	1
1990	6	0
1991	0	0
1992	2	0
Total	34	1

== Honours ==
=== Player ===
São Paulo

- Campeonato Paulista: 1985, 1987
- Campeonato Brasileiro Série A: 1986

Sampdoria

- Supercoppa Italiana: 1991

Internacional

- Campeonato Gaúcho: 1992
- Copa do Brasil: 1992

Vasco da Gama

- Campeonato Carioca: 1994

San Lorenzo

- Argentine Primera División: 1994–95 (Clausura)

Atlético-PR

- Campeonato Paranaense: 2000

Brazil U20

- South American Youth Football Championship: 1985
- FIFA World Youth Championship: 1985

Brazil

- Copa América: 1989

=== Managerial ===
Avaí FC

- Campeonato Catarinense: 2009

Grêmio

- Campeonato Gaúcho: 2010

Al-Arabi

- Sheikh Jassem Cup: 2011

Al-Gharafa

- Emir of Qatar Cup: 2012

Ceará

- Copa do Nordeste: 2015
