= Mariano (footballer, born 1951) =

Brazilian footballer

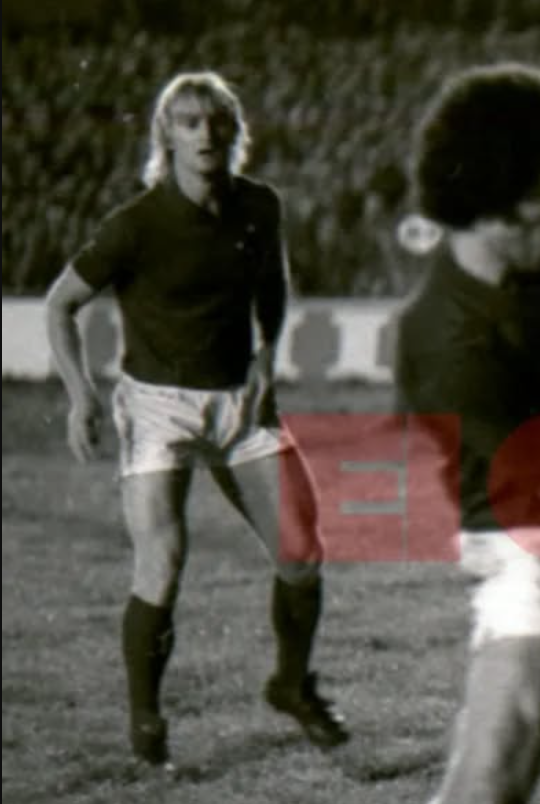
- Mariano in 1977

Personal information
- Full name: Mariano Noé Schmitz
- Date of birth: 21 May 1951 (age 75)
- Place of birth: Cerro Largo, Brazil
- Position: Right back

Youth career
- Cerrolarguense

Senior career*
Years	Team	Apps	(Gls)
1971–1974	Elite		
1975	Internacional		
1976	Inter de Santa Maria		
1976–1980	Cruzeiro	137	(1)
1981–1983	Taubaté		
1984–1985	Sertãozinho		
- * Club domestic league appearances and goals as of 26 January 2024

Mariano Noé Schmitz (born 21 May 1951), simply known as Mariano, is a Brazilian former professional footballer who played as a right back.

== Career ==
Right back, Mariano played for Elite de Santo Ângelo, and Internacional, before arriving at Cruzeiro, where he was Nelinho's reserve in winning the 1976 Copa Libertadores. He made 137 appearances and scored one goal.

== Honours ==
Cruzeiro

- Copa Libertadores: 1976
- Campeonato Mineiro: 1977
