= Micão =

Brazilian footballer (born 1980)

Personal information
- Full name: Rômulo da Silva
- Date of birth: 7 February 1980 (age 46)
- Place of birth: Belo Horizonte, Brazil
- Height: 1.86 m (6 ft 1 in)
- Position: Centre-back

Senior career*
| Years | Team | Apps | (Gls) |
| 2001–2006 | Villa Nova | | |
| 2004–2005 | → Montes Claros (loan) | | |
| 2007 | Noroeste | | |
| 2007 | Fortaleza | | |
| 2008 | Guarani-MG | | |
| 2008–2012 | América Mineiro | +100 | |
| 2011 | → Itumbiara (loan) | | |
| 2012 | Fortaleza | | |
| 2013 | Red Bull Brasil | | |
| 2014 | Minas Boca | | |
- * Club domestic league appearances and goals as of 3 January 2024

Rômulo da Silva (born 7 February 1980), better known as Micão, is a Brazilian former professional footballer who played as a centre-back.

== Career ==
With spells at Villa Nova and Montes Claros FC, Micão played for EC Noroeste in the 2007 Campeonato Paulista and 2007 Série B for Fortaleza. After a good performance in the Campeonato Mineiro with Guarani, he arrived at América, a team where he made more than 100 appearances and won the 2009 Campeonato Brasileiro Série C. He was loaned to Itumbiara in the first half of 2011, and negotiated with Fortaleza definitively in 2012. He ended the career at Minas Boca in 2014.

== Honours ==
América Mineiro

- Campeonato Brasileiro Série C: 2009
