= Pianelli (footballer) =

Brazilian footballer

Personal information
- Full name: José Eduardo Pianelli
- Date of birth: 2 May 1963 (age 63)
- Place of birth: Piracicaba, Brazil
- Positions: Attacking midfielder; forward

Youth career
- –1983: XV de Piracicaba

Senior career*
Years	Team	Apps	(Gls)
1983	XV de Piracicaba		
1984–1987	São Paulo	120	(21)
1987	América-SP		
1988	Juventus-SP		
1989–1990	Rio Branco-SP		
1992	Ponte Preta		
1993	Jalesense		
1993	Comercial-RP		
1994	XV de Piracicaba		
1994	Pelotas		
1996	Inter de Bebedouro		
1998	XV de Piracicaba		
- * Club domestic league appearances and goals as of 26 September 2023

José Eduardo Pianelli (born 2 May 1963), simply known as Pianelli, is a Brazilian former professional footballer who played as an attacking midfielder and forward.

== Career ==
Pianelli was the main player highlighted in the title of XV de Piracicaba in the second division in 1983. Caught the attention of São Paulo FC, where he played until 1987, becoming champion of São Paulo and Brazilian. In 1990 he also participated in the promoted Rio Branco campaign.

== Honours ==
XV de Piracicaba

- Campeonato Paulista Série A2: 1983

São Paulo

- Campeonato Paulista: 1985
- Campeonato Brasileiro: 1986

América-SP

- Torneio José Maria Marín: 1987
