= Eli Carlos =

Brazilian footballer

Personal information
- Full name: Eli Carlos Alberto Pereira
- Date of birth: 19 April 1954
- Place of birth: Ribeirão Preto, Brazil
- Date of death: 22 May 2020 (aged 66)
- Place of death: Campinas, Brazil
- Height: 1.77 m (5 ft 10 in)
- Position: Forward

Senior career*
Years	Team	Apps	(Gls)
1970–1973	Guarani		
1974	Comercial-SP		
1975–1976	Coritiba		
1977–1980	Cruzeiro	96	(34)
1978	→ Flamengo (loan)	23	(4)
1981	Francana		
1982	Coritiba		
1982	São José-SP		
1983	Matsubara		
1984	Ferroviário Itu		
1985	Paulista		
1986	Palmeiras FC (SJBV)		

Managerial career
- 1988: Guarani
- 1990: Guarani
- 1999: Francana
- 1999–2000: Bragantino
- * Club domestic league appearances and goals as of 27 January 2024

Eli Carlos Alberto Pereira (19 April 1954 – 22 May 2020), better known as Eli Carlos, was a Brazilian professional footballer and manager who played as a forward.

== Career ==
Eli began his career playing for Guarani FC de Campinas, the team with which he created the greatest identification in his career. He also played for Comercial in his hometown, Ribeirão Preto.

With Coritiba, he was state champion in 1975 and 1976, in addition to making 132 appearances and 54 goals for the club in two spells. At Cruzeiro, he became Eli Carlos due to the presence of another player called Eli (Eli Mendes). He won the 1977 Minas Gerais championship, being the competition's top scorer. He was loaned to Flamengo in 1978, and was part of the state champion squad.

He ended his career playing for teams in the countryside of São Paulo.

== Managerial career ==
Eli Carlos had some jobs as a coach, especially at Guarani and Bragantino, and also served as football director at Guarani, Paulista de Jundiaí and Primavera. He was also a sports commentator.

== Personal life ==
Eli Carlos is the elder brother of the also footballers Paulo Silas and Paulo Pereira.

== Honours ==
Coritiba

- Campeonato Paranaense: 1975, 1976

Cruzeiro

- Campeonato Mineiro: 1977

Flamengo

- Campeonato Carioca: 1978

Individual

- 1977 Campeonato Mineiro top scorer: 17 goals

== Death ==
Eli Carlos died on 22 May 2020, after two years in a coma, as a result of an unsuccessful endoscopy.
