= Freitas (footballer, born 1963) =

Brazilian footballer

Personal information
- Full name: Manoel Cassiano de Freitas
- Date of birth: 30 December 1963 (age 62)
- Place of birth: Manaus, Brazil
- Position: Forward

Youth career
- Nacional-AM

Senior career*
Years	Team	Apps	(Gls)
1983–1985	Nacional-AM		
1985–1986	São Paulo	19	(7)
1987–1988	Nacional-AM		
1989	Rio Negro-AM		
1990–1994	Nacional-AM		
1995–1996	Fast Clube		
1998	Rio Negro-AM		
- * Club domestic league appearances and goals as of 28 October 2023

Manoel Cassiano de Freitas (born 30 December 1963), simply known as Freitas, is a Brazilian former professional footballer who played as a forward.

== Career ==
Dadá Maravilha's attacking partner at Nacional during the 80s, the player was hired by São Paulo FC in 1985, and despite the good start he was unable to adapt to the club's reality, returning to Amazonas state football where he played until his retirement.

== Honours ==
Nacional

- Campeonato Amazonense: 1983, 1984, 1991

São Paulo

- Campeonato Paulista: 1985

Rio Negro

- Campeonato Amazonense: 1989
