= 1986 in Brazilian football =

Football in Brazil
- Season: 1986

The following article presents a summary of the 1986 football (soccer) season in Brazil, which was the 85th season of competitive football in the country.

== Campeonato Brasileiro Série A ==
Quarterfinals

Team 1	Agg.	Team 2	1st leg	2nd leg
Bahia	2-3	Guarani	2-2	0-1
Cruzeiro	3-3	Atlético Mineiro	0-0	1-1
Fluminense	1-2	São Paulo	1-0	0-2
Corinthians	2-3	America-RJ	0-2	2-1

Semifinals

Team 1	Agg.	Team 2	1st leg	2nd leg
Atlético Mineiro	1-2	Guarani	0-0	1-2
São Paulo	2-1	America-RJ	1-0	1-1

Final

February 22, 1987

São Paulo	1–1	Guarani

Morumbi

February 25, 1987

Guarani	1–1 (2–2 after extra time, 3–4 pen)	São Paulo

Brinco de Ouro

São Paulo declared as the Campeonato Brasileiro champions by aggregate score of 3-3.

== State championship champions ==
State	Champion	State	Champion
Acre	Juventus-AC	Paraíba	Botafogo-PB
Alagoas	CRB	Paraná	Coritiba
Amapá	Macapá	Pernambuco	Santa Cruz
Amazonas	Nacional	Piauí	Flamengo-PI
Bahia	Bahia	Rio de Janeiro	Flamengo
Ceará	Ceará	Rio Grande do Norte	Alecrim
Distrito Federal	Sobradinho	Rio Grande do Sul	Grêmio
Espírito Santo	Desportiva	Rondônia	Ferroviário-RO
Goiás	Goiás	Roraima	Baré
Maranhão	Sampaio Corrêa	Santa Catarina	Criciúma
Mato Grosso	Operário (VG)	São Paulo	Internacional-SP
Mato Grosso do Sul	Operário	Sergipe	Confiança
Minas Gerais	Atlético Mineiro	Tocantins	-
Pará	Remo		

== Youth competition champions ==
Competition	Champion
Copa São Paulo de Juniores	Fluminense
Taça Belo Horizonte de Juniores	Flamengo

== Other competition champions ==
Competition	Champion
Taça Minas Gerais	Atlético Mineiro
Torneio de Integração da Amazônia	Trem

== Brazilian clubs in international competitions ==
Team	Copa Libertadores 1986
Bangu	Group stage
Coritiba	Group stage

== Brazil national team ==
The following table lists all the games played by the Brazil national football team in official competitions and friendly matches during 1986.

Date	Opposition	Result	Score	Brazil scorers	Competition
March 12, 1986	West Germany	L	0-2	-	International Friendly
March 16, 1986	Hungary	L	0-3	-	International Friendly
April 1, 1986	Peru	W	4-0	Casagrande (2), Alemão, Careca	International Friendly
April 8, 1986	East Germany	W	3-0	Müller, Alemão, Careca	International Friendly
April 17, 1986	Finland	W	3-0	Marinho, Oscar, Casagrande	International Friendly
April 30, 1986	Yugoslavia	W	4-2	Zico (3), Careca	International Friendly
May 7, 1986	Chile	D	1-1	Casagrande	International Friendly
June 1, 1986	Spain	W	1-0	Sócrates	World Cup
June 6, 1986	Algeria	W	1-0	Careca	World Cup
June 12, 1986	Northern Ireland	W	3-0	Careca (2), Josimar	World Cup
June 16, 1986	Poland	W	4-0	Sócrates, Josimar, Edinho, Careca	World Cup
June 21, 1986	France	D	1-1 (3-4 pen)	Careca	World Cup

== Women's football ==
=== National team ===
The following table lists all the games played by the Brazil women's national football team in official competitions and friendly matches during 1986.

Date	Opposition	Result	Score	Brazil scorers	Competition
July 22, 1986	Netherlands	L	1–2	unavailable	International Friendly
July 24, 1986	China	D	1–1	unavailable	International Friendly
July 25, 1986	United States	L	1–3	unavailable	International Friendly

=== Domestic competition champions ===
Competition	Champion
Campeonato Carioca	Radar
Taça Brasil	Radar
