= 1985 in Brazilian football =

Football in Brazil
- Season: 1985

The following article presents a summary of the 1985 football (soccer) season in Brazil, which was the 84th season of competitive football in the country.

== Campeonato Brasileiro Série A ==
Semifinals

Team 1	Agg.	Team 2	1st leg	2nd leg
Brasil de Pelotas	1-4	Bangu	0-1	1-3
Coritiba	1-0	Atlético Mineiro	1-0	0-0

Final

July 31, 1985

Bangu	1–1 (0–0 after extra time, 5–6 pen)	Coritiba

Maracanã

Coritiba declared as the Campeonato Brasileiro champions.

== Campeonato Brasileiro Série B ==
Pos	Team	Pld	W	D	L	GF	GA	GD	Pts
1	(Pará) Tuna Luso	4	3	0	1	7	5	+2	6
2	(Rio de Janeiro (state)) Goytacaz	4	1	1	2	4	4	0	3
3	(Santa Catarina (state)) Figueirense	4	1	1	2	7	9	−2	3

Tuna Luso declared as the Campeonato Brasileiro Série B champions.

=== Promotion ===
The competition champion, which is Tuna Luso, was promoted to the following year's first level.

== State championship champions ==
State	Champion	State	Champion
Acre	Juventus-AC	Paraíba	the competition was not decided
Alagoas	CSA	Paraná	Atlético Paranaense
Amapá	Santana	Pernambuco	Náutico
Amazonas	Nacional	Piauí	Piauí
Bahia	Vitória	Rio de Janeiro	Fluminense
Ceará	Fortaleza	Rio Grande do Norte	Alecrim
Distrito Federal	Sobradinho	Rio Grande do Sul	Grêmio
Espírito Santo	Rio Branco	Rondônia	Flamengo-RO
Goiás	Atlético Goianiense	Roraima	Atlético Roraima
Maranhão	Sampaio Corrêa	Santa Catarina	Joinville
Mato Grosso	Operário-VG	São Paulo	São Paulo
Mato Grosso do Sul	Comercial	Sergipe	Sergipe
Minas Gerais	Atlético Mineiro	Tocantins	-
Pará	Paysandu		

== Youth competition champions ==
Competition	Champion
Copa São Paulo de Juniores	Juventus
Taça Belo Horizonte de Juniores	Cruzeiro

== Other competition champions ==
Competition	Champion
Taça Minas Gerais	Cruzeiro
Torneio de Integração da Amazônia	Baré; Trem*

* The 1985 title was shared between Baré and Trem.

== Brazilian clubs in international competitions ==
Team	Copa Libertadores 1985
Fluminense	Group stage
Vasco	Group stage

== Brazil national team ==
The following table lists all the games played by the Brazil national football team in official competitions and friendly matches during 1985.

Date	Opposition	Result	Score	Brazil scorers	Competition
April 25, 1985	Colombia	W	2-1	Alemão, Casagrande	International Friendly
April 28, 1985	Peru	L	0-1	-	International Friendly
May 2, 1985	Uruguay	W	2-0	Alemão, Careca	International Friendly
May 5, 1985	Argentina	W	2-1	Alemão, Careca	International Friendly
May 15, 1985	Colombia	L	0-1	-	International Friendly
May 21, 1985	Chile	L	1-2	Casagrande	International Friendly
June 2, 1985	Bolivia	W	2-0	Casagrande, Noro (own goal)	World Cup Qualifying
June 8, 1985	Chile	W	3-1	Zico (2), Leandro	International Friendly
June 16, 1985	Paraguay	W	2-0	Casagrande, Zico	World Cup Qualifying
June 23, 1985	Paraguay	D	1-1	Sócrates	World Cup Qualifying
June 30, 1985	Bolivia	D	1-1	Careca	World Cup Qualifying

== Women's football ==
=== Domestic competition champions ===
Competition	Champion
Campeonato Carioca	Radar
Taça Brasil	Radar
