= 1985 Campeonato Paulista =

Campeonato Paulista – Série A1
- Season: 1985
- Champions: São Paulo
- Relegated: Noroeste; Marília
- Série A: São Paulo
- Matches: 386
- Goals: 740 (1.92 per match)
- Top goalscorer: Careca (São Paulo) – 23 goals
- Biggest home win: São Paulo 5-0 São Bento (July 31, 1985)
- Biggest away win: Botafogo 0-4 Portuguesa (May 22, 1985)
- Highest scoring: Inter de Limeira 5-2 Comercial (June 6, 1985)

The 1985 Campeonato Paulista da Primeira Divisão de Futebol Profissional da Série A1 was the 84th season of São Paulo's top professional football league. São Paulo won the championship for the 14th time. São Paulo's Careca was the top scorer with 23 goals. Noroeste and Marília were relegated.

== Championship ==
The twenty teams of the championship would all play twice against each other, with the best teams of each half and the two overall best teams qualifying to the Semifinals, and the bottom two teams being relegated.

=== First phase ===
| Pos | Team | Pld | W | D | L | GF | GA | GD | Pts | Qualification or relegation |
|---|---|---|---|---|---|---|---|---|---|---|
| 1 | Portuguesa | 38 | 18 | 16 | 4 | 49 | 27 | +22 | 52 | Qualified as stage winners |
| 2 | São Paulo | 38 | 20 | 11 | 7 | 63 | 26 | +37 | 51 | Qualified as stage winners |
| 3 | Guarani | 38 | 14 | 17 | 7 | 38 | 34 | +4 | 45 | Qualified due to best season record |
| 4 | Ferroviária | 38 | 14 | 14 | 10 | 41 | 38 | +3 | 42 | Qualified due to best season record |
| 5 | Corinthians | 38 | 12 | 18 | 8 | 41 | 33 | +8 | 42 | |
| 6 | Santos | 38 | 14 | 12 | 12 | 35 | 34 | +1 | 40 | |
| 7 | Palmeiras | 38 | 13 | 14 | 11 | 36 | 33 | +3 | 40 | |
| 8 | América | 38 | 13 | 13 | 12 | 30 | 38 | −8 | 39 | |
| 9 | Ponte Preta | 38 | 13 | 12 | 13 | 42 | 35 | +7 | 38 | |
| 10 | Inter de Limeira | 38 | 11 | 15 | 12 | 41 | 35 | +6 | 37 | |
| 11 | XV de Jaú | 38 | 10 | 16 | 12 | 36 | 43 | −7 | 36 | |
| 12 | Juventus | 38 | 13 | 9 | 16 | 37 | 38 | −1 | 35 | |
| 13 | Paulista | 38 | 9 | 16 | 13 | 31 | 34 | −3 | 34 | |
| 14 | Santo André | 38 | 9 | 16 | 13 | 26 | 29 | −3 | 34 | |
| 15 | XV de Piracicaba | 38 | 6 | 22 | 10 | 31 | 36 | −5 | 34 | |
| 16 | Botafogo | 38 | 11 | 11 | 16 | 39 | 43 | −4 | 33 | |
| 17 | São Bento | 38 | 11 | 11 | 16 | 28 | 42 | −14 | 33 | |
| 18 | Comercial | 38 | 11 | 10 | 17 | 33 | 50 | −17 | 32 | |
| 19 | Noroeste | 38 | 10 | 12 | 16 | 26 | 38 | −12 | 32 | Relegated |
| 20 | Marília | 38 | 8 | 15 | 15 | 22 | 35 | −13 | 31 | Relegated |

Updated to match(es) played on November 24, 1985. Source: RSSSF.com
Rules for classification: 1) points; 2) wins; 3) goal difference; 4) number of goals scored.

=== Semifinals ===
| Team 1 | Agg. | Team 2 | 1st leg | 2nd leg |
|---|---|---|---|---|
| Guarani | 1–4 | São Paulo | 1–1 | 0–3 |
| Ferroviária | 2–4 | Portuguesa | 2–2 | 0–2 |

=== Finals ===
| Team 1 | Agg. | Team 2 | 1st leg | 2nd leg |
|---|---|---|---|---|
| São Paulo | 5–2 | Portuguesa | 3–1 | 2–1 |
