= 1987 Campeonato Paulista =

Campeonato Paulista – Série A1
- Season: 1987
- Champions: São Paulo
- Relegated: Ponte Preta; Bandeirante
- Matches: 386
- Goals: 721 (1.87 per match)
- Top goalscorer: Edmar (Corinthians) – 19 goals
- Biggest home win: Noroeste 5–0 Novorizontino (May 10, 1987); Santo André 5-0 Ferroviária (July 26, 1987); Santos 6-1 Ponte Preta (July 29, 1987); Corinthians 5-0 Botafogo (August 5, 1987)
- Biggest away win: Ferroviária 0–4 Santos (May 24, 1987); Santo André 0-4 São Paulo (June 10, 1987)
- Highest scoring: Santos 6-1 Ponte Preta (July 29, 1987)

The 1987 Campeonato Paulista da Primeira Divisão de Futebol Profissional was the 86th season of São Paulo's top professional football league. São Paulo won the championship for the 15th time. Ponte Preta and Bandeirante were relegated.

== Championship ==
The twenty teams of the championship would all play twice against each other, with the best teams of each half and the two overall best teams qualifying to the Semifinals, and the bottom two teams being relegated.

=== First phase ===
Pos	Team	Pld	W	D	L	GF	GA	GD	Pts	Qualification or relegation
1	Santos	38	16	16	6	47	27	+20	48	Qualified due to best season record
2	Palmeiras	38	14	19	5	36	23	+13	47	Qualified as stage winners
3	São Paulo	38	15	16	7	56	40	+16	46	Qualified due to best season record
4	Corinthians	38	17	11	10	54	38	+16	45	Qualified as stage winners
5	Inter de Limeira	38	17	11	10	32	31	+1	45	
6	Portuguesa	38	14	14	10	38	30	+8	42	
7	Botafogo	38	14	12	12	42	41	+1	40	
8	Santo André	38	13	13	12	41	48	−7	39	
9	Juventus	38	12	15	11	40	32	+8	39	
10	São Bento	38	9	21	8	26	24	+2	39	
11	Noroeste	38	14	10	14	41	39	+2	38	
12	Guarani	38	9	19	10	29	25	+4	37	
13	XV de Jaú	38	9	17	12	32	35	−3	35	
14	Ferroviária	38	8	18	12	22	40	−18	34	
15	Mogi Mirim	38	10	13	15	37	42	−5	33	
16	XV de Piracicaba	38	9	15	14	27	37	−10	33	
17	Novorizontino	38	8	17	13	28	36	−8	33	
18	América	38	7	19	12	27	40	−13	33	
19	Ponte Preta	38	7	17	14	26	42	−16	31	Relegated
20	Bandeirante	38	6	11	21	23	47	−24	23	Relegated

Updated to match(es) played on August 12, 1987. Source: RSSSF.com
Rules for classification: 1) points; 2) wins; 3) goal difference; 4) number of goals scored.

=== Semifinals ===
Team 1	Agg.	Team 2	1st leg	2nd leg
Palmeiras	1–3	São Paulo	0–0	1–3
Corinthians	5–1	Santos	5–1	0–0

=== Finals ===
Team 1	Agg.	Team 2	1st leg	2nd leg
Corinthians	1–2	São Paulo	1–2	0–0

== Top Scores ==
Rank	Player	Club	Goals
1	Edmar	Corinthians	19
2	Carlos Alberto Seixas	Mogi Morim	16
3	Rodinaldo	Noroeste	15
4	Lê	São Paulo	14
5	Cláudio Adão	Portuguesa	13
6	Dicão	Santo André	12
6	Osvaldo	Santos	12
6	Müller	São Paulo	12
6	Hélio	Novorizontino	12
10	Luís Carlos	Santos	11
10	Edu Manga	Palmeiras	11
