= 1986 Campeonato Brasileiro Série A =

Campeonato Brasileiro Série A
- Season: 1986
- Champions: São Paulo (2nd title)
- Copa Libertadores: São Paulo; Guarani
- Biggest home win: Corinthians 6–0 Sergipe (September 14, 1986); Palmeiras 6-0 Fortaleza (September 17, 1986); Guarani 8–2 Piauí (October 2, 1986); Vasco da Gama 6-0 Operário-MT (October 5, 1986)
- Biggest away win: Sobradinho 0–5 Corinthians (October 29, 1986)
- Highest scoring: Guarani 8–2 Piauí (October 2, 1986)

The 1986 Campeonato Brasileiro Série A was the 30th edition of the Campeonato Brasileiro Série A. São Paulo won the championship.

== Overview and format ==
The 1986 tournament ranks as one of the most controversial ever, alongside 1987. For its detractors, it apparently revived old devils from late 1970s by featuring back a single division with 80 teams, allegedly for political reasons as CBF sought support from smaller teams against growing criticism of the top traditional clubs. These in turn saw this as weaker revenue possibilities, exemplified by 1985 final play-offs, combined with real increased competitiveness from these smaller provincial clubs, now also at national league level. Promotion and relegation were still taboo, and unthinkable for top-tier teams. But CBF introduced for the first time this feature (which actually justified the single division formula once for all in order to level the playing field for next-year tournament with more conventional divisions of 24 teams).

First phase (Groups A, B, C & D)
80 teams divided into eight groups. In practice the first four groups constituted a top-tier division featuring 19 teams chosen by their historical ranking records, the 22 champions of 1985 state championships, the two finalists of 1985 and the champion of the 1985 Série B (Tuna Luso). Those would be divided into 4 groups of eleven teams, in which the seven best teams on each group and the four best non-qualified teams, regardless of group, would qualify to the second phase.

First phase (Groups E, F, G & H)
In July 1986, when CBF announced the dispute of Parallel Tournament, only 24 clubs would take part. Twenty-two of these clubs would be selected by FA through 1986 state championship record. The others two were Goytacaz, runner-up of 1985 Taça de Prata, and Brasil de Pelotas, the second-best-placed team in the final standings among the teams from groups C and D in the 1985 Taça de Ouro. Through August, some FAs started to pressure for more berths. FFERJ chose Americano to represent the state, instead of Campo Grande, claiming that the 1985 Campeonato Carioca rules gave to the former a berth in 1986 and Campo Grande would have the same right in 1987 (what never happened). Campo Grande protested, threatening to take the matter to court. This situation led to an extension of participants in Parallel Tournament. CBF included other 12 clubs. Ironically, Rio de Janeiro didn't receive an additional berth and Campo Grande did not participate. Under the new rules, the 36 teams would be divided into 4 groups of nine teams, in which only the first-placed team qualified to the second phase.

Second phase
Originally, it would have comprised the 24 qualified teams in each group, the four best non-qualified teams and the four group champions of Groups E, F, G and H, giving a total of 32. Those 32 teams would be divided into four groups of 8, in which the two bottom teams would be relegated to the 1987 Série B and the four top-placed teams would qualify to the round of 16. the qualified teams, along with the two other eliminated teams, would participate in the 1987 Série A. However, Vasco da Gama, after being eliminated in the first phase, attempted to get Joinville's berth in the second phase, since Joinville had won the points of a draw against Sergipe due to one player of Sergipe having been caught in an anti-doping test. If that extra point was taken from Joinville, Joinville would fall to 8th place in the group, and Vasco would qualify due to having a better goal difference. As an attempted solution, CBF gave berths in the second phase to both Vasco and Joinville, eliminating Portuguesa, that had appealed to the common courts in an unrelated case about ticket sales. After being threatened with the withdrawal of the clubs from São Paulo, CBF reversed its decision and enlarged the second stage to 36 clubs, qualifying Vasco da Gama, Náutico, Santa Cruz and Sobradinho. Because of that, the 1987 championship was enlarged to 28 clubs. Regardless, the new rules still were fundamentally the same, with the seven top teams of each group qualifying for the 1987 Série A, the bottom two teams being relegated and the four top teams qualifying to the Round of 16.

Final phases
16-team double play-offs. In case that two teams ended tied in goal difference after two matches, the team with the best record in the previous phase would qualify.

== First phase ==
=== Group A ===
Pos	Team	Pld	W	D	L	GF	GA	GD	Pts
1	(São Paulo (state)) São Paulo	10	7	3	0	21	7	+14	17
2	(Rio Grande do Sul) Internacional	10	5	4	1	13	5	+8	14
3	(Pernambuco) Sport	10	5	3	2	11	6	+5	13
4	(Rio de Janeiro (state)) Fluminense	10	5	2	3	9	7	+2	12
5	(Rio de Janeiro (state)) Bangu	10	4	4	2	11	6	+5	12
6	Ceará	10	3	4	3	8	10	−2	10
7	(Federal District (Brazil)) Sobradinho	10	3	2	5	8	12	−4	8
8	(Mato Grosso do Sul) Operário-MS	10	3	1	6	9	15	−6	7
9	(Maranhão) Sampaio Corrêa	10	1	4	5	5	15	−10	6
10	(Pará) Remo	10	0	6	4	9	15	−6	6
11	(Paraná (state)) Coritiba	10	1	3	6	3	9	−6	5

=== Group B ===
Pos	Team	Pld	W	D	L	GF	GA	GD	Pts
1	(Rio de Janeiro (state)) Flamengo	10	6	2	2	15	7	+8	14
2	(São Paulo (state)) Ponte Preta	10	6	1	3	18	11	+7	13
3	(São Paulo (state)) Corinthians	10	5	3	2	16	6	+10	13
4	(Paraná (state)) Atlético Paranaense	10	4	4	2	12	5	+7	12
5	(Rio Grande do Sul) Grêmio	10	4	3	3	15	11	+4	11
6	(Rio de Janeiro (state)) America-RJ	10	4	2	4	10	11	−1	10
7	(Santa Catarina (state)) Joinville	10	4	2	4	14	17	−3	10
8	Goiás	10	3	4	3	8	9	−1	10
9	(Paraíba) Botafogo-PB	10	3	1	6	9	16	−7	7
10	Sergipe	10	3	1	6	5	16	−11	7
11	(Pará) Paysandu	10	1	1	8	5	18	−13	3

=== Group C ===
Pos	Team	Pld	W	D	L	GF	GA	GD	Pts
1	Bahia	10	7	3	0	19	4	+15	17
2	(São Paulo (state)) Guarani	10	7	2	1	19	15	+4	16
3	(São Paulo (state)) Santos	10	6	2	2	16	6	+10	14
4	(Espírito Santo) Rio Branco-ES	10	5	4	1	10	5	+5	14
5	(Minas Gerais) Cruzeiro	10	4	3	3	12	6	+6	11
6	(Goiás) Atlético Goianiense	10	4	2	4	9	8	+1	10
7	(Rio de Janeiro (state)) Vasco da Gama	10	3	3	4	11	4	+7	9
8	(Pernambuco) Náutico	10	4	0	6	7	13	−6	8
9	(Pará) Tuna Luso	10	2	1	7	8	20	−12	5
10	Piauí	10	1	1	8	6	26	−20	3
11	(Mato Grosso) Operário-MT	10	1	1	8	4	24	−20	3

=== Group D ===
Pos	Team	Pld	W	D	L	GF	GA	GD	Pts
1	(Minas Gerais) Atlético Mineiro	10	7	3	0	18	6	+12	17
2	(São Paulo (state)) Portuguesa	10	4	4	2	12	12	0	12
3	(Bahia) Vitória	10	2	7	1	12	10	+2	11
4	(São Paulo (state)) Palmeiras	10	4	2	4	19	10	+9	10
5	(Amazonas (Brazilian state)) Nacional	10	3	4	3	10	9	+1	10
6	(Alagoas) CSA	10	3	4	3	8	7	+1	10
7	(Rio de Janeiro (state)) Botafogo	10	3	4	3	11	11	0	10
8	(Mato Grosso do Sul) Comercial-MS	10	3	4	3	9	11	−2	10
9	(Pernambuco) Santa Cruz	10	3	3	4	11	14	−3	9
10	(Ceará) Fortaleza	10	2	2	6	7	19	−12	6
11	(Rio Grande do Norte) Alecrim	10	1	3	6	7	15	−8	5

== Second phase ==
=== Group I ===
Pos	Team	Pld	W	D	L	GF	GA	GD	Pts
1	(São Paulo (state)) Palmeiras	16	7	8	1	22	11	+11	22
2	(São Paulo (state)) São Paulo	16	7	7	2	29	7	+22	21
3	(Santa Catarina (state)) Joinville	16	5	8	3	14	12	+2	18
4	(Rio de Janeiro (state)) America-RJ	16	5	8	3	14	14	0	18
5	(São Paulo (state)) Santos	16	3	9	4	9	10	−1	15
6	(Rio de Janeiro (state)) Bangu	16	4	6	6	10	17	−7	14
7	(Paraíba) Treze	16	4	4	8	8	20	−12	12
8	(Rio de Janeiro (state)) Botafogo	16	3	6	7	10	17	−7	12
9	(São Paulo (state)) Ponte Preta	16	3	6	7	11	19	−8	12

=== Group J ===
Pos	Team	Pld	W	D	L	GF	GA	GD	Pts
1	(São Paulo (state)) Guarani	16	10	5	1	26	6	+20	25
2	(Rio de Janeiro (state)) Fluminense	16	9	4	3	21	8	+13	22
3	(Rio de Janeiro (state)) Flamengo	16	6	5	5	18	10	+8	17
4	(Rio Grande do Sul) Grêmio	16	5	5	6	16	15	+1	15
5	Goiás	16	4	7	5	17	21	−4	15
6	(Pernambuco) Santa Cruz	16	3	9	4	13	16	−3	15
7	(Goiás) Atlético Goianiense	16	3	7	6	14	20	−6	13
8	(Bahia) Vitória	16	4	4	8	11	20	−9	12
9	(Pernambuco) Central	16	2	6	8	11	31	−20	10

=== Group K ===
Pos	Team	Pld	W	D	L	GF	GA	GD	Pts
1	(Minas Gerais) Cruzeiro	16	8	5	3	23	12	+11	21
2	(São Paulo (state)) Portuguesa	16	7	7	2	19	10	+9	21
3	Bahia	16	9	2	5	17	13	+4	20
4	(São Paulo (state)) Inter de Limeira	16	6	6	4	19	18	+1	18
5	(Paraná (state)) Atlético Paranaense	16	5	7	4	15	12	+3	17
6	(Pernambuco) Náutico	16	6	2	8	14	18	−4	14
7	(Alagoas) CSA	16	4	6	6	12	16	−4	14
8	(Pernambuco) Sport	16	3	4	9	14	21	−7	10
9	(Mato Grosso do Sul) Comercial-MS	16	2	5	9	13	26	−13	9

=== Group L ===
Pos	Team	Pld	W	D	L	GF	GA	GD	Pts
1	(Minas Gerais) Atlético Mineiro	16	9	4	3	17	10	+7	22
2	(São Paulo (state)) Corinthians	16	7	7	2	23	10	+13	21
3	(Rio de Janeiro (state)) Vasco da Gama	16	7	5	4	24	15	+9	19
4	(Santa Catarina (state)) Criciúma	16	7	5	4	14	13	+1	19
5	(Rio Grande do Sul) Internacional	16	7	4	5	27	18	+9	18
6	Ceará	16	5	4	7	17	21	−4	14
7	(Espírito Santo) Rio Branco-ES	16	5	3	8	19	24	−5	13
8	(Amazonas (Brazilian state)) Nacional	16	4	2	10	15	24	−9	10
9	(Federal District (Brazil)) Sobradinho	16	2	4	10	13	34	−21	8

== Round of 16 ==
Team 1	Agg.	Team 2	1st leg	2nd leg
Bahia	2–1	Palmeiras	2–0	0–1
Vasco da Gama	0-5	Guarani	0–3	0-2
Joinville	1–2	Cruzeiro	1–1	0–1
Flamengo	1-2	Atlético Mineiro	1-1	0-1
Criciúma	2-2	Fluminense	2-1	0-1
Inter de Limeira	2-4	São Paulo	2–1	0-3
Grêmio	1-1	Corinthians	0-0	1-1
America-RJ	1-0	Portuguesa	1–0	0-0

== Quarterfinals ==
Team 1	Agg.	Team 2	1st leg	2nd leg
Bahia	2-3	Guarani	2-2	0-1
Cruzeiro	1-1	Atlético Mineiro	0-0	1-1
Fluminense	1-2	São Paulo	1-0	0-2
Corinthians	2-3	America-RJ	0-2	2-1

== Semifinals ==
Team 1	Agg.	Team 2	1st leg	2nd leg
Atlético Mineiro	1-2	Guarani	0-0	1-2
São Paulo	2-1	America-RJ	1-0	1-1

== Finals ==
22 February 1987

São Paulo (São Paulo (state))	1–1	(São Paulo (state)) Guarani
Careca 63'		Evair 60'

Morumbi, São Paulo (SP)
Attendance: 81,060
Referee: (São Paulo (state)) Romualdo Arppi Filho

25 February 1987

Guarani (São Paulo (state))	3–3 (a.e.t.)	(São Paulo (state)) São Paulo
Nelsinho 2' (o.g.); Boiadeiro 97'; João Paulo 110'		Ricardo Rocha 9' (o.g.); Pita 91'; Careca 119'
Penalties
Boiadeiro (penalty missed); Tosin (penalty scored); João Paulo (penalty missed); Valdir Carioca (penalty scored); Evair (penalty scored)	3–4	Careca (penalty missed); Darío Pereyra (penalty scored); Fonseca (penalty scored); Rômulo (penalty scored); Wagner Basílio (penalty scored)

Brinco de Ouro, Campinas (SP)
Attendance: 37,370
Referee: (São Paulo (state)) José de Assis Aragão

== Final standings ==
Pos	Team	Pld	W	D	L	GF	GA	GD	Pts
1	São Paulo	34	17	13	4	62	22	+40	47
2	Guarani	34	21	11	2	59	18	+41	53
3	Atlético Mineiro	32	17	11	4	39	20	+19	45
4	América-RJ	32	11	12	9	29	29	0	34
5	Bahia	30	17	6	7	40	21	+19	40
6	Fluminense	30	16	6	8	33	19	+14	38
7	Corinthians	30	13	12	5	42	20	+22	38
8	Cruzeiro	30	12	12	6	38	21	+17	36
9	Criciúma	26	14	7	5	28	19	+9	35
10	Palmeiras	28	12	10	6	42	23	+19	34
11	Portuguesa	28	11	12	5	31	23	+8	34
12	Inter de Limeira	26	13	7	6	37	25	+12	33
13	Flamengo	28	12	8	8	34	19	+15	32
14	Joinville	28	8	13	7	30	31	−1	29
15	Vasco da Gama	28	10	8	10	35	24	+11	28
16	Grêmio	28	9	10	9	32	27	+5	28
17	Internacional	26	12	8	6	40	23	+17	32
18	Atlético Paranaense	26	9	11	6	27	17	+10	29
19	Santos	26	9	11	6	25	16	+9	29
20	Rio Branco-ES	26	10	7	9	29	29	0	27
21	Bangu	26	8	10	8	21	23	−2	26
22	Ponte Preta	26	9	7	10	29	30	−1	25
23	Goiás	26	7	11	8	25	30	−5	25
24	Treze	24	9	6	9	16	22	−6	24
25	Ceará	26	8	8	10	25	31	−6	24
26	CSA	26	7	10	9	20	23	−3	24
27	Santa Cruz	26	6	12	8	24	30	−6	24
28	Sport	26	8	7	11	25	27	−2	23
29	Atlético-GO	26	7	9	10	23	28	−5	23
30	Vitória	26	6	11	9	23	30	−7	23
31	Náutico	26	10	2	14	21	31	−10	22
32	Botafogo	26	6	10	10	21	8	+13	22
33	Central	24	7	7	10	22	37	−15	21
34	Nacional	26	7	6	13	25	33	−8	20
35	Comercial-MS	26	5	9	12	22	37	−15	19
36	Sobradinho	26	5	6	15	21	46	−25	16
37	Sergipe	10	3	2	5	5	16	−11	8
38	Operário-MS	10	3	1	6	9	15	−6	7
39	Botafogo-PB	10	3	1	6	9	16	−7	7
40	Fortaleza	10	2	2	6	7	19	−12	6
41	Sampaio Corrêa	10	1	4	5	5	15	−10	6
42	Remo	10	0	6	4	9	15	−6	6
43	Tuna Luso	10	2	1	7	8	20	−12	5
44	Coritiba	10	1	3	6	3	9	−6	5
45	Alecrim	10	1	3	6	7	15	−8	5
46	Paysandu	10	1	1	8	5	18	−13	3
47	Piauí	10	1	1	8	6	26	−20	3
48	Operário-MT	10	1	1	8	4	24	−20	3

Source: rsssf.com

Champions and qualified to Copa Libertadores 1987
Runners-up and qualified to Copa Libertadores 1987
Eliminated in the semifinals
Eliminated in the quarterfinals
Eliminated in the Round of 16
Eliminated in the Second Stage
Eliminated in the First Stage (groups A-D)

Campeonato Brasileiro Série A 1986

2nd title

== Série A and Série B overall standings ==
Pos	Team	Pld	W	D	L	GF	GA	GD	Pts
1	São Paulo	34	17	13	4	62	22	+40	47
2	Guarani	34	21	11	2	59	18	+41	53
3	Atlético Mineiro	32	17	11	4	39	20	+19	45
4	América-RJ	32	11	12	9	29	29	0	34
5	Bahia	30	17	6	7	40	21	+19	40
6	Fluminense	30	16	6	8	33	19	+14	38
7	Corinthians	30	13	12	5	42	20	+22	38
8	Cruzeiro	30	12	12	6	38	21	+17	36
9	Criciúma	26	14	7	5	28	19	+9	35
10	Palmeiras	28	12	10	6	42	23	+19	34
11	Portuguesa	28	11	12	5	31	23	+8	34
12	Inter de Limeira	26	13	7	6	37	25	+12	33
13	Flamengo	28	12	8	8	34	19	+15	32
14	Joinville	28	8	13	7	30	31	−1	29
15	Vasco da Gama	28	10	8	10	35	24	+11	28
16	Grêmio	28	9	10	9	32	27	+5	28
17	Internacional	26	12	8	6	40	23	+17	32
18	Atlético Paranaense	26	9	11	6	27	17	+10	29
19	Santos	26	9	11	6	25	16	+9	29
20	Rio Branco-ES	26	10	7	9	29	29	0	27
21	Bangu	26	8	10	8	21	23	−2	26
22	Ponte Preta	26	9	7	10	29	30	−1	25
23	Goiás	26	7	11	8	25	30	−5	25
24	Treze	24	9	6	9	16	22	−6	24
25	Ceará	26	8	8	10	25	31	−6	24
26	CSA	26	7	10	9	20	23	−3	24
27	Santa Cruz	26	6	12	8	24	30	−6	24
28	Sport	26	8	7	11	25	27	−2	23
29	Atlético-GO	26	7	9	10	23	28	−5	23
30	Vitória	26	6	11	9	23	30	−7	23
31	Náutico	26	10	2	14	21	31	−10	22
32	Botafogo	26	6	10	10	21	28	−7	22
33	Central	24	7	7	10	22	37	−15	21
34	Nacional	26	7	6	13	25	33	−8	20
35	Comercial-MS	26	5	9	12	22	37	−15	19
36	Sobradinho	26	5	6	15	21	46	−25	16
37	Sergipe	10	3	2	5	5	16	−11	8
38	Operário-MS	10	3	1	6	9	15	−6	7
39	Botafogo-PB	10	3	1	6	9	16	−7	7
40	Fortaleza	10	2	2	6	7	19	−12	6
41	Sampaio Corrêa	10	1	4	5	5	15	−10	6
42	Remo	10	0	6	4	9	15	−6	6
43	Tuna Luso	10	2	1	7	8	20	−12	5
44	Coritiba	10	1	3	6	3	9	−6	5
45	Alecrim	10	1	3	6	7	15	−8	5
46	Paysandu	10	1	1	8	5	18	−13	3
47	Piauí	10	1	1	8	6	26	−20	3
48	Operário-MT	10	1	1	8	4	24	−20	3
49	Juventus	8	4	4	0	8	2	+6	12
50	Americano-RJ	8	5	1	2	11	6	+5	11
51	Maranhão	8	4	2	2	10	7	+3	10
52	Marcílio Dias	8	4	2	2	8	6	+2	10
53	Rio Negro	8	3	4	1	5	2	+3	10
54	Goytacaz	8	4	1	3	12	11	+1	9
55	Moto Club	8	4	1	3	9	10	−1	9
56	América-RN	8	3	3	2	9	3	+6	9
57	Pinheiros	8	3	3	2	11	9	+2	9
58	Londrina	8	3	3	2	9	8	+1	9
59	Santo André	8	3	3	2	8	8	0	9
60	Desportiva Capixaba	8	3	2	3	9	7	+2	8
61	Guarany-CE	8	3	2	3	8	9	−1	8
62	Anápolis	8	3	2	3	8	9	−1	8
63	CRB	8	3	2	3	6	7	−1	8
64	Juventude	8	2	4	2	7	5	+2	8
65	Catuense	8	2	4	2	9	9	0	8
66	Itumbiara	8	1	6	1	6	7	−1	8
67	Taguatinga	8	3	1	4	14	12	+2	7
68	Avaí	8	3	1	4	5	6	−1	7
69	Novo Hamburgo	8	3	1	4	8	11	−3	7
70	América Mineiro	8	2	3	3	10	9	+1	7
71	Ferroviário-CE	8	1	4	3	7	8	−1	6
72	Ubiratan	7	1	4	2	5	6	−1	6
73	Fluminense de Feira	8	1	4	3	7	12	−5	6
74	Brasil de Pelotas	8	1	2	5	8	13	−5	4
75	Sport Belém	8	1	2	5	5	11	−6	4
76	Confiança	8	1	2	5	5	14	−9	4
77	Mixto	8	1	2	5	9	21	−12	4
78	Cascavel	8	0	4	4	6	12	−6	4
79	River	8	0	4	4	6	15	−9	4
80	Uberlândia	7	0	3	4	2	7	−5	3

Source: rsssf.com

== Sources ==
- 1986 Campeonato Brasileiro Série A at RSSSF
- RSSSF Brasil
