= 1976 Argentine Campeonato Nacional final =

1976 Campeonato Nacional final
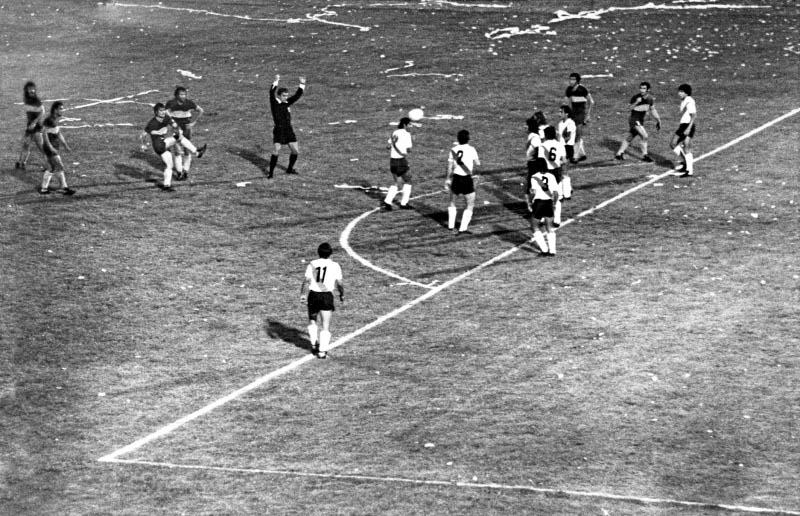
- Sequence of Rubén Suñé's free kick goal, which consagrated Boca Juniors as champions.
- Event: 1976 Campeonato Nacional
Boca Juniors	River Plate
1	0
- Date: 22 December 1976
- Venue: Racing Club Stadium, Avellaneda
- Referee: Arturo Ithurralde
- Attendance: 69,090

The 1976 Campeonato Nacional final was the last match of the 1976 Campeonato Nacional of Argentine Primera División. It was held at the Racing Club Stadium in Avellaneda on 22 December 1976. The match was the first official final played between both clubs, which are the most popular in Argentina and whose long-lived rivalry is known as Superclásico.

It was the fourth Primera División final played by Boca Juniors. The team had previously played a tiebreaker v Huracán in 1923 (when the champion was defined after four matches held), 1929 (lost to Gimnasia y Esgrima LP), and 1970 (defeated Rosario Central 2–1 at Estadio Monumental).

On the other hand, this match was also the fourth league final contested by River Plate after the team had to define titles in 1932 (win vs Independiente) and 1936 Copa de Oro (defeating San Lorenzo de Almagro), while the team lost to Chacarita Juniors in the 1969 Metropolitano.

Boca Juniors won its 20th league title after beating River Plate 1–0 with a free-kick goal scored by Rubén Suñé. Although official records indicate that 69,090 tickets were sold, other sources state that the match was attended by many more people, some of them estimating about 90,000 spectators. Boca Juniors player Jorge Ribolzi spoke of it, stating that he had never again seen so many people attending a match.

== Qualified teams ==
Team	Previous finals app.
Boca Juniors	**1923**, 1929, **1970**
River Plate	**1932**, **1936** (Note: The 1936 season was divided into two single round-robin tournaments, "Copa Campeonato" (won by River Plate) and "Copa de Honor" (won by San Lorenzo). At the end of the season, both teams played the "Copa de Oro", a single match won by River. In its Memoria y Balance (Annual Report) published by the AFA that year, River Plate is mentioned as "1936 Champion" while San Lorenzo is only mentioned as "Copa de honor winning team". In its 100th anniversary book published in 1993, the AFA listed River Plate as the only 1936 champion. In 2013, the AFA included three 1936 championships on its website, mentioning River Plate as Copa de Oro and Copa Campeonato winner and San Lorenzo as Copa de Honor winner, therefore both clubs were added one league title to their honours. Moreover, some historians consider Copa de Oro a national cup instead of a league championship, stating that it was only contested to qualify an Argentine representative to play the Copa Aldao against the Uruguayan champion.) , 1969 Met

- Bold: indicates winning years
- Met: Campeonato Metropolitano

== Venue ==
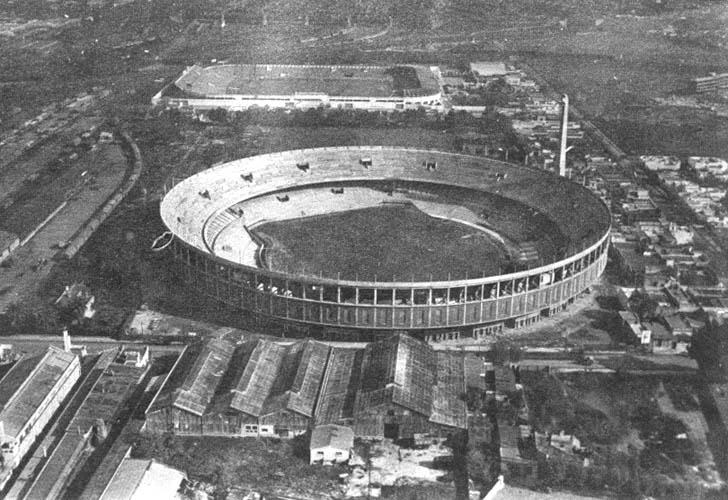
Racing Club Stadium was the venue

The neutral venue to host the match was Estadio Presidente Perón in Avellaneda, home venue of Racing Club, which had a capacity of 95,000 spectators by then. Nevertheless, some sources estimate that the stadium largely surpassed its capacity with more than 100,000 people attending the match.

That was the second all-time record attendance in the history of El Cilindro, only after the second leg of the 1967 Intercontinental Cup, when more than 120,000 supporters attended to watch the 2–1 win over Scottish side Celtic F.C..

== Road to the final ==
In the first stage, participating clubs were divided into four groups of 8 teams each, playing a double round-robin for a total of 16 fixtures each. The two best placed teams in each zone qualified to the next round.

Boca Juniors		Round	River Plate	
Opponent	Result	Group stage	Opponent	Result
Temperley	1–0 (H)	Matchday 1	Banfield	0–0 (A)
Quilmes	1–0 (A)	Matchday 2	San Telmo	7–1 (H)
River Plate	1–1 (H)	Matchday 3 (Note: Inter-zonal match.)	Boca Juniors	1–1 (A)
Gimnasia y Esgrima LP	2–1 (A)	Matchday 4	Estudiantes (LP)	1–0 (A)
Atlético Tucumán	2–1 (A)	Matchday 5	San Martín (T)	2–1 (H)
Gimnasia y Esgrima (J)	3–1 (H)	Matchday 6	Atlético Ledesma	3–0 (A)
Independiente	1–2 (A)	Matchday 7	Racing	4–2 (H)
Chacarita Juniors	2–1 (H)	Matchday 8	Atlanta	1–1 (A)
Temperley	5–0 (A)	Matchday 9	Banfield	1–3 (H)
Quilmes	0–1 (H)	Matchday 10	San Telmo	5–2 (A)
River Plate	2–0 (A)	Matchday 11	Boca Juniors	0–2 (H)
Gimnasia y Esgrima LP	0–0 (A)	Matchday 12	Estudiantes (LP)	0–0 (H)
Atlético Tucumán	0–1 (H)	Matchday 13	San Martín (T)	2–1 (A)
Gimnasia y Esgrima (J)	0–0 (A)	Matchday 14	Atlético Ledesma	1–0 (H)
Independiente	1–0 (H)	Matchday 15	Racing	1–0 (A)
Chacarita Juniors	2–1 (A)	Matchday 16	Atlanta	2–0 (H)
Quilmes	2–1 (N)	First place tiebreaker	–	–
**Group D winners**: Pos. / Team / Pts / W / T / L / Pl; 1 / Boca Juniors / 23 / 10 / 3 / 3 / 16; 2 / Quilmes / 23 / 9 / 5 / 2 / 16; 3 / Independiente / 21 / 8 / 5 / 3 / 16; 4 / Atlético Tucumán / 17 / 7 / 3 / 6 / 16		Final standings	**Group E winners**: Pos. / Team / Pts / W / T / L / Pl; 1 / River Plate / 24 / 10 / 4 / 2 / 16; 2 / Banfield / 22 / 9 / 4 / 3 / 16; 3 / Estudiantes (LP) / 21 / 8 / 5 / 3 / 16; 4 / Racing / 17 / 7 / 3 / 6 / 16	
Banfield	2–1 (N)	Quarterfinals	Quilmes	2–1 (N)
Huracán	1–0 (N)	Semifinals	Talleres (C)	1–0 (N)

== The match ==
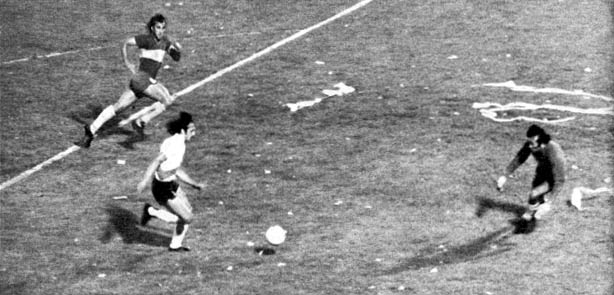
River Plate forward Leopoldo Luque v goalkeeper Hugo Gatti

The two teams played a struggling match, showing their mutual respect. The first significately attack from River Plate was a distant shot by midfielder Juan José López. The ball was barely touched by goalkeeper Hugo Gatti to avoid the first goal but conceding a corner kick to River Plate. That play caused Gatti to receive an ovation from Boca Juniors' supporters. Instead some other attempts by River Plate forwards, the score remained 0–0 at the end of the first half.

At 72', defender Daniel Passarella committed a foul trying to stop Boca Juniors forward Carlos Veglio near the River Plate's penalty area. Referee Arturo Ithurralde had previously talked with the captains of both clubs about recent changes to football rules introduced by FIFA.

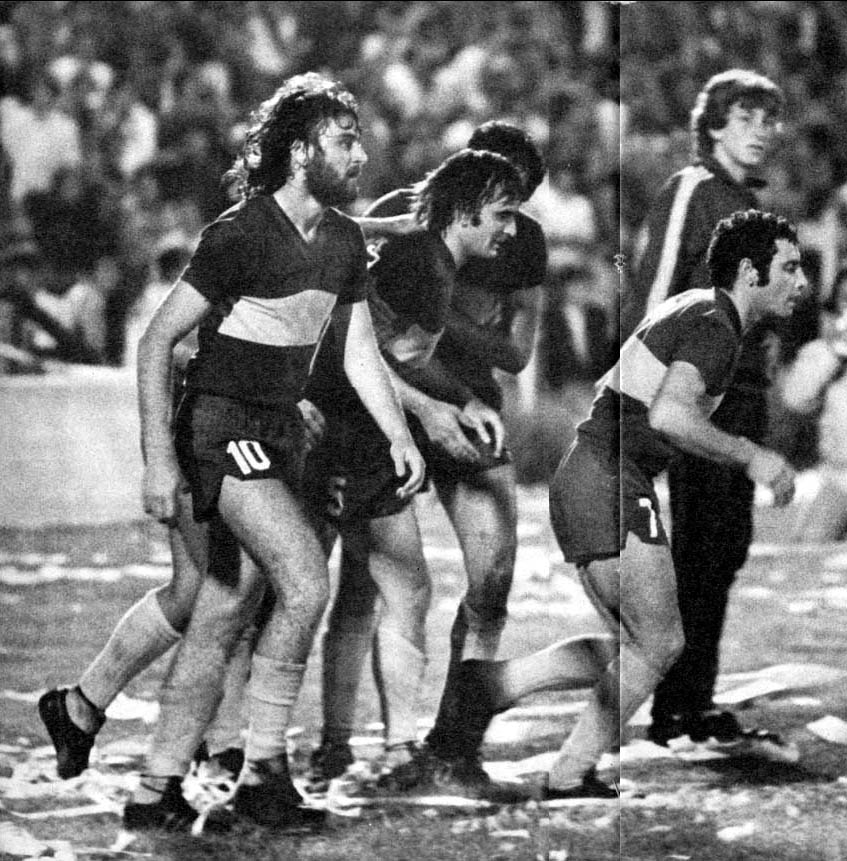
Players of Boca Juniors celebrating the goal

Before the match started, the referee told the captains (Roberto Perfumo and me) that (due to rule changes) it was not necessary to wait the referee blew the whistle to kick. If opponents retreated the required distance, player taking the free kick was able to shot to the goal.

— Rubén Suñé, many years after the match, when his goal had become legendary.

As none of the River players stood in front of the ball, Suñé sent it to the goal kept by Ubaldo Fillol before the astonished gaze of Roberto Mouzo, the supposed kicker. The quick action surprissed Fillol, who remained stood while the ball flew to the goal. The goal was largely celebrated by Boca Juniors' fans in the stadium, including former player Ángel Clemente Rojas, regarded as the greatest Boca Juniors idol by then, who was attending the match.

=== Match details ===
1976 Campeonato Nacional Final
22 December 1976

Boca Juniors	1–0	River Plate
Suñé 72'	Report 1 Report 2

Racing Stadium, Avellaneda
Attendance: 69,090
Referee: Arturo Ithurralde

**Boca Juniors**
**River Plate**

GK	1	(Argentina) Hugo Gatti
DF	4	(Argentina) Vicente Pernía
DF	2	(Argentina) Francisco Sá
DF	6	(Argentina) Roberto Mouzo
DF	3	(Argentina) Alberto Tarantini
MF	8	(Argentina) Carlos Veglio
MF	5	(Argentina) Rubén Suñé
MF	10	(Argentina) Jorge Ribolzi
FW	7	(Argentina) Ernesto Mastrángelo
FW	9	(Argentina) Juan Taverna
FW	11	(Argentina) Darío Felman	(substituted off) 45'
Substitutions:
MF		(Argentina) Mario Zanabria	(substituted on) 45'
GK		(Argentina) Héctor Pistone
DF		(Argentina) Armando Ovide
DF		(Argentina) José Luis Tesare
FW		(Argentina) Enrique Oviedo
Manager:
(Argentina) Juan Carlos Lorenzo

GK	1	(Argentina) Ubaldo Fillol
DF	4	(Argentina) Pablo Comelles
DF	2	(Argentina) Roberto Perfumo
DF	6	(Argentina) Daniel Passarella
DF	3	(Argentina) Héctor López
MF	8	(Argentina) Juan José López
MF	5	(Argentina) Reinaldo Merlo
MF	10	(Argentina) Alberto Beltrán	(substituted off) 61'
FW	7	(Argentina) Pedro Alexis González
FW	9	(Argentina) Leopoldo Luque
FW	11	(Argentina) Oscar Más
Substitutions:
FW		(Argentina) Victorio Cocco	(substituted on) 61'
GK		(Argentina) Luis Landaburu
DF		(Argentina) Eduardo Saporiti
DF		(Argentina) Héctor Ártico
MF		(Argentina) Emilio Commisso
Manager:
(Argentina) Ángel Labruna

== The "ghost goal" ==
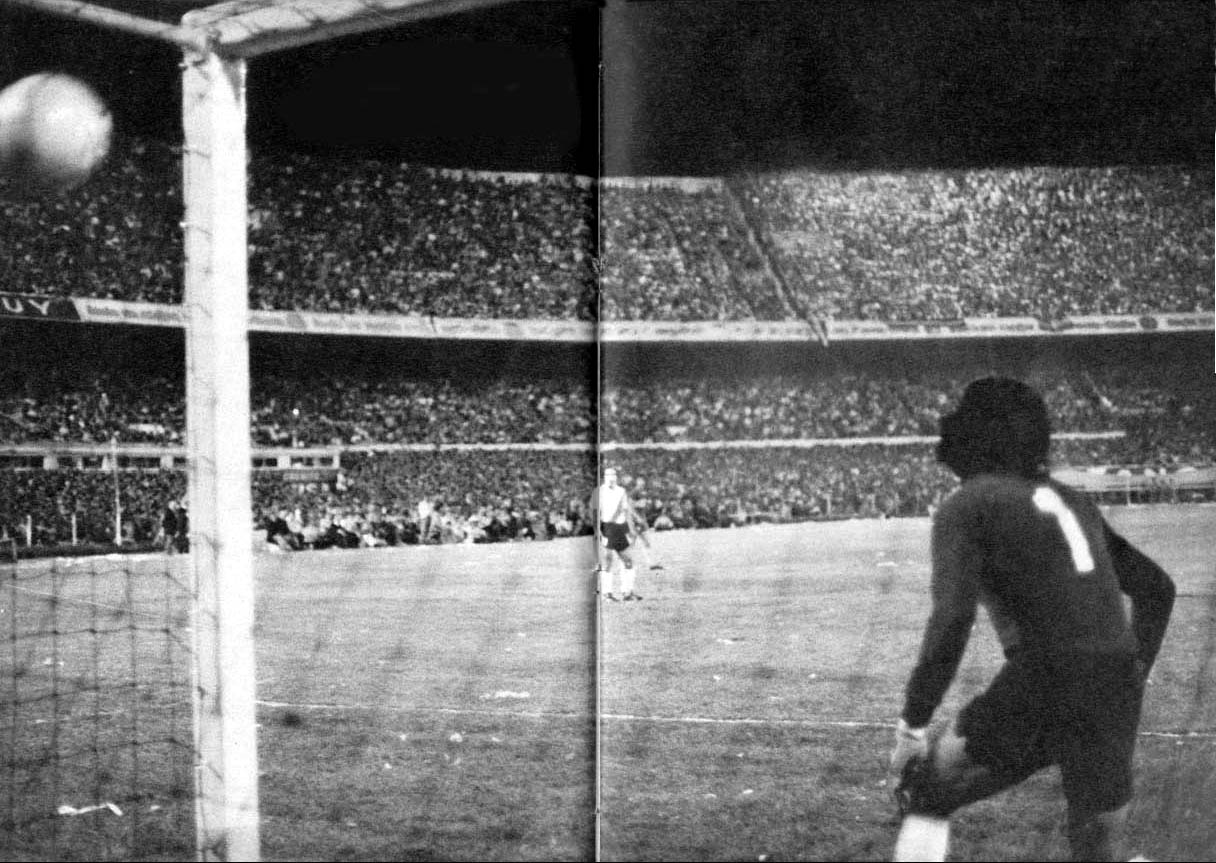
River Plate's goalkeeper Fillol watching the ball. Due to lack of film records, that goal was nicknamed "the ghost goal"

Despite the Boca–River match being broadcast on television, it was believed that there was no surviving record of that goal (only a photographic sequence published by El Gráfico served as approach). Because of that, the goal was popularly known as "the ghost goal". Nevertheless, in November 2019, Boca Juniors announced that a record of that goal had been found. The goal had been recorded by a fan collector from Entre Ríos Province. He had taken the images directly from his television in Super 8 film while the match was being aired.

A short movie depicting some moments prior to the free kick and the goal was screened at the Passion for Boca Juniors Museum of Buenos Aires. The release was attended by a select group of members and former players of the club.
