= 1979 Copa Libertadores finals =

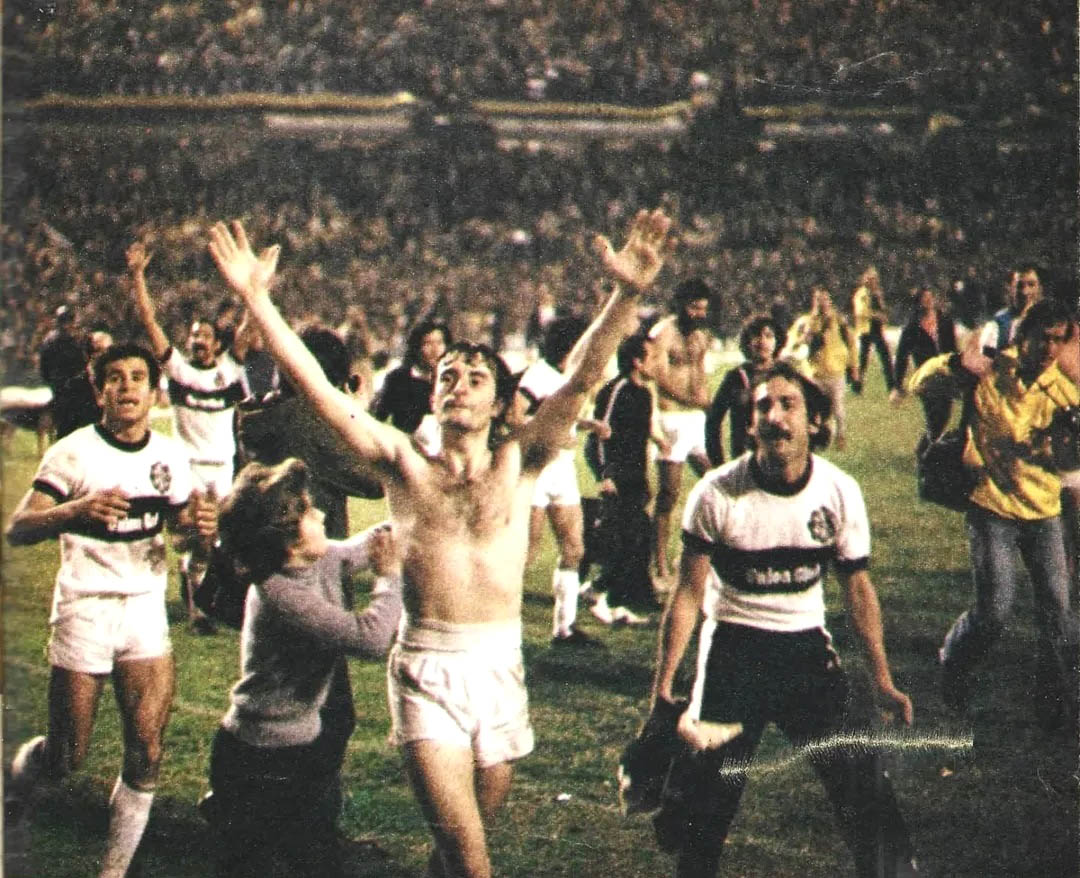
- Olimpia, champions
- Event: 1979 Copa Libertadores de América
| Olimpia | Boca Juniors |
| (Paraguay) | (Argentina) |
| 2 | 0 |
- Olimpia won 3-1 on points.

First leg
| Olimpia | Boca Juniors |
| 2 | 0 |
- Date: July 22, 1979
- Venue: Estadio Defensores del Chaco, Asunción
- Referee: Gastón Castro (Chile)

Second leg
| Boca Juniors | Olimpia |
| 0 | 0 |
- Date: July 27, 1979
- Venue: La Bombonera, Buenos Aires
- Referee: Juan Daniel Cardellino (Uruguay)

The 1979 Copa Libertadores finals was the final two-legged tie to determine the 1979 Copa Libertadores champion. It was contested by club Boca Juniors and club Olimpia. The first leg of the tie was played on July 22 at Olimpia' home field, with the second leg played on July 27 at Boca Juniors'. It was Olimpia 2nd Copa Libertadores finals and 4th finals for Boca Juniors.

Olimpia won the series after winning the first leg tie 2-0 at Asunción's Estadio Defensores del Chaco, and tying the second leg tie 0-0 at Buenos Aires's Estadio Alberto J. Armando and accumulated more points than their opponent.

== Qualified teams ==
| Team | Previous finals app. |
|---|---|
| (Paraguay) Olimpia | 1960 |
| (Argentina) Boca Juniors | 1963, **1977**, **1978** |

Bold indicates winning years

== Rules ==
The finals will be played over two legs; home and away. The team that accumulates the most points —two for a win, one for a draw, zero for a loss— after the two legs will be crowned the champion. If the two teams are tied on points after the second leg, a playoff in a neutral venue will become the next tie-breaker. Goal difference is going to be used as a last resort.

== Venues ==
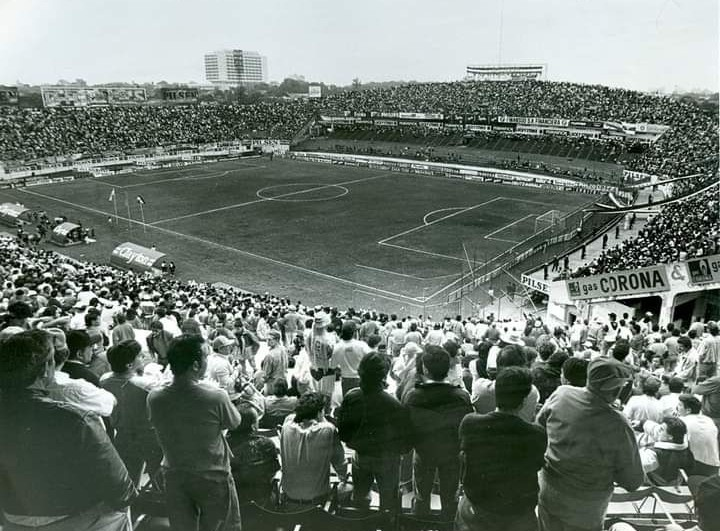
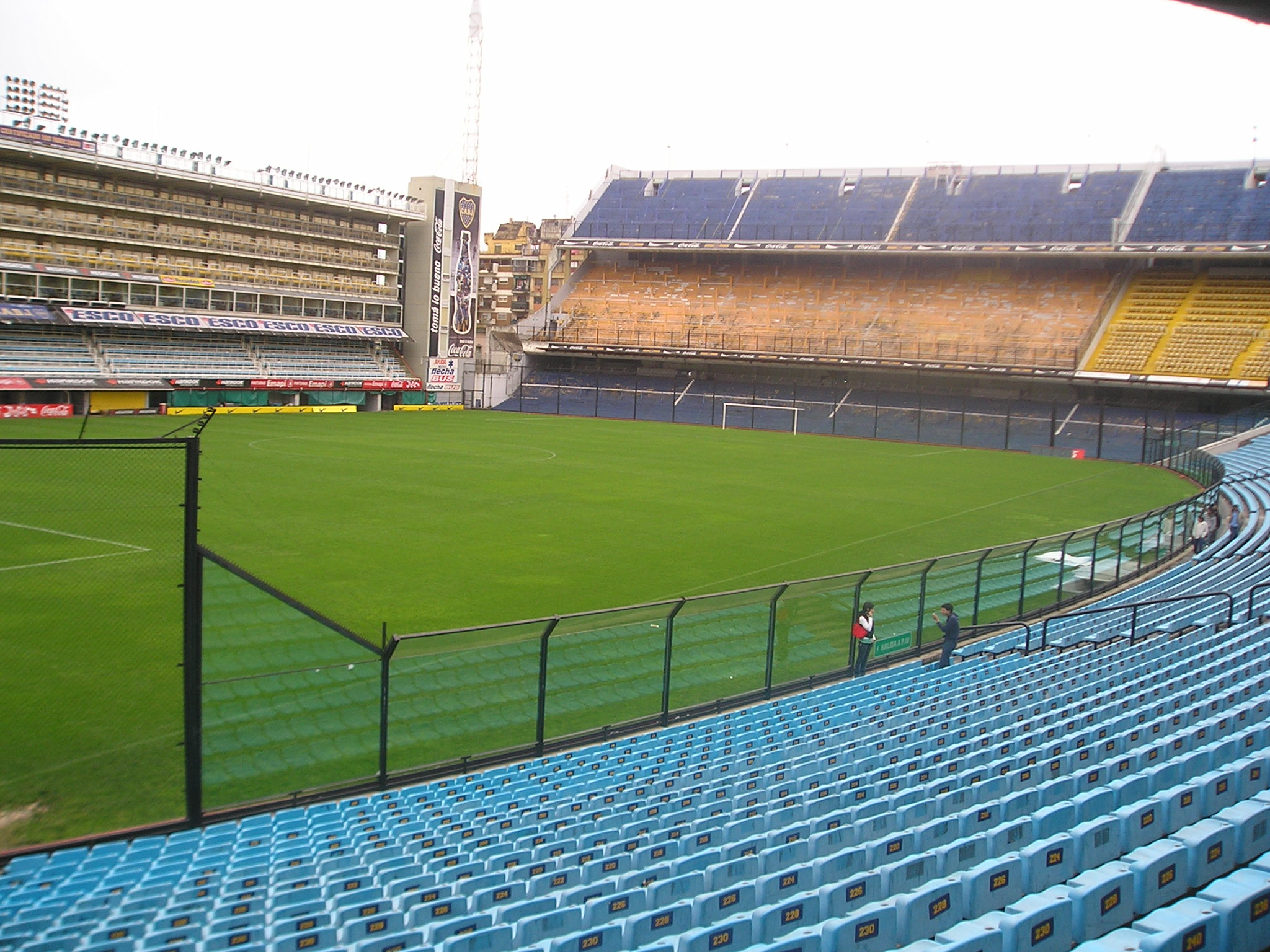
Estadio Defensores del Chaco (left) and La Bombonera, venues of the series

== Matches ==
=== First leg ===
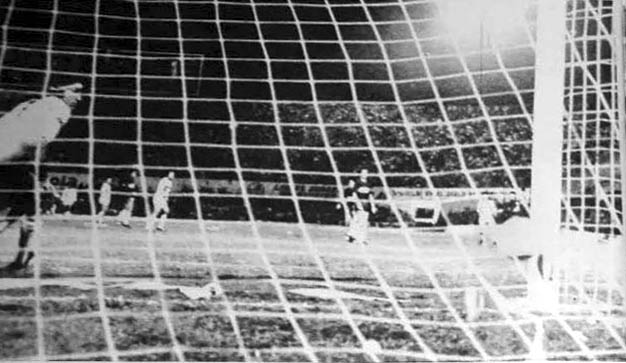
The first goal of Olimpia in Asunción

1979 Copa Libertadores finals
July 22, 1979
First leg

| Olimpia (Paraguay) | 2–0 | (Argentina) Boca Juniors |
|---|---|---|
| Aquino 2'; Piazza 27' | Report |

Estadio Defensores del Chaco, Asunción
Attendance: 50,000
Referee: Gastón Castro (Chile)

| **Olimpia** | **Boca Juniors** |

| GK | (Uruguay) (Paraguay) Ever Almeida |
| DF | (Paraguay) Rubén Jiménez |
| DF | (Paraguay) Alicio Solalinde |
| DF | (Uruguay) Miguel A. Piazza |
| DF | (Paraguay) Enrique Villalba |
| MF | (Paraguay) Carlos Kiese |
| MF | (Paraguay) Luis Torres |
| MF | (Paraguay) Roberto Paredes |
| FW | (Paraguay) Osvaldo Aquino |
| FW | (Paraguay) Hugo Talavera (c) |
| FW | (Paraguay) Evaristo Isasi |
Substitutes:
Manager:
(Uruguay) Luis Cubilla

| GK | 1 | (Argentina) Hugo Gatti |
| DF | 4 | (Argentina) Vicente Pernía |
| DF | 15 | (Argentina) Armando Capurro |
| DF | 6 | (Argentina) Roberto Mouzo |
| DF | 3 | (Argentina) Miguel Bordón |
| MF | 8 | (Argentina) Jorge Benítez | (substituted off) 45' |
| MF | 5 | (Argentina) Rubén Suñé (c) |
| MF | 10 | (Argentina) Carlos Horacio Salinas |
| FW | 7 | (Argentina) Ernesto Mastrángelo |
| FW | 21 | (Argentina) Carlos Salguero |
| FW | 20 | (Argentina) Juan Ramón Rocha |
Substitutes:
| MF | 25 | (Argentina) José A. Palacios | (substituted on) 45' |
Manager:
(Argentina) Juan Carlos Lorenzo

=== Second leg ===
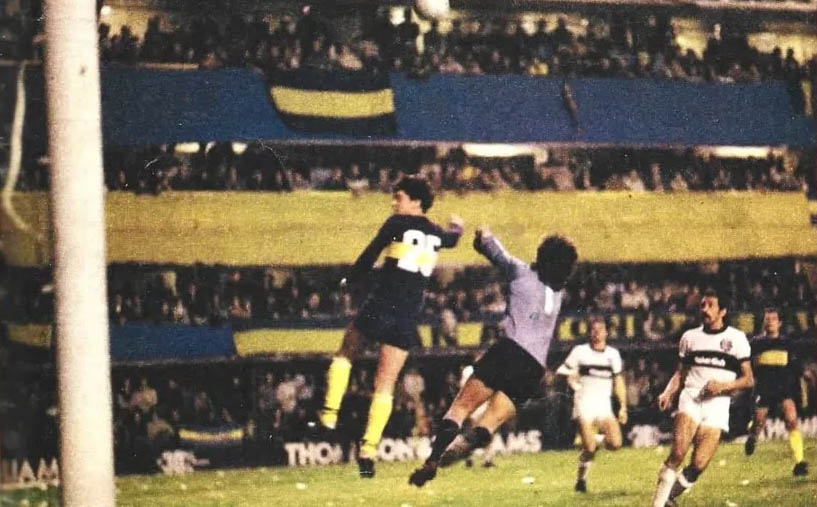
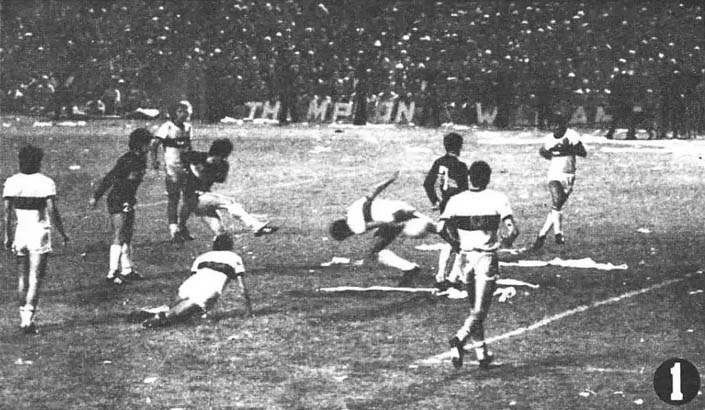
Some moments of the second match at La Bombonera
July 27, 1979
Second leg

| Boca Juniors (Argentina) | 0–0 | (Paraguay) Olimpia |
|---|---|---|
| | Report |

La Bombonera, Buenos Aires
Attendance: 65,000
Referee: Juan Cardellino (Uruguay)

| **Boca Juniors** | **Olimpia** |

| GK | 1 | (Argentina) Hugo Gatti |
| DF | 4 | (Argentina) Vicente Pernía |
| DF | 2 | (Argentina) Francisco Sá |
| DF | 15 | (Argentina) Armando Capurro |
| DF | 3 | (Argentina) Miguel Bordón |
| MF | 8 | (Argentina) Jorge Benítez | (red card) 69' |
| MF | 5 | (Argentina) Rubén Suñé (c) | (red card) 2' |
| MF | 18 | (Argentina) Mario Zanabria | | (substituted off) 78' |
| FW | 7 | (Argentina) Ernesto Mastrángelo |
| FW | 10 | (Argentina) Carlos Horacio Salinas |
| FW | 20 | (Argentina) Juan Ramón Rocha | | (substituted off) 45' |
Substitutes:
| MF | 25 | (Argentina) José A. Palacios | | (substituted on) 45' |
| FW | 21 | (Argentina) Carlos Salguero | | (substituted on) 78' |
Manager:
(Argentina) Juan Carlos Lorenzo

| GK | (Uruguay) (Paraguay) Ever Almeida |
| DF | (Paraguay) Rubén Jiménez |
| DF | (Paraguay) Alicio Solalinde |
| DF | (Uruguay) Miguel A. Piazza |
| DF | (Paraguay) Enrique Villalba |
| MF | (Paraguay) Carlos Kiese | (red card) 69' |
| MF | (Paraguay) Luis Torres | | (substituted off) 72' |
| MF | (Paraguay) Roberto Paredes | (red card) 2' |
| FW | (Paraguay) Osvaldo Aquino | | (substituted off) 10' |
| FW | (Paraguay) Hugo Talavera (c) |
| FW | (Paraguay) Evaristo Isasi |
Substitutes:
| DF | (Paraguay) Rogelio Delgado | | (substituted on) 10' |
| MF | (Paraguay) Jorge Guasch | | (substituted on) 72' |
Manager:
(Uruguay) Luis Cubilla
