= 1978 Copa Libertadores finals =

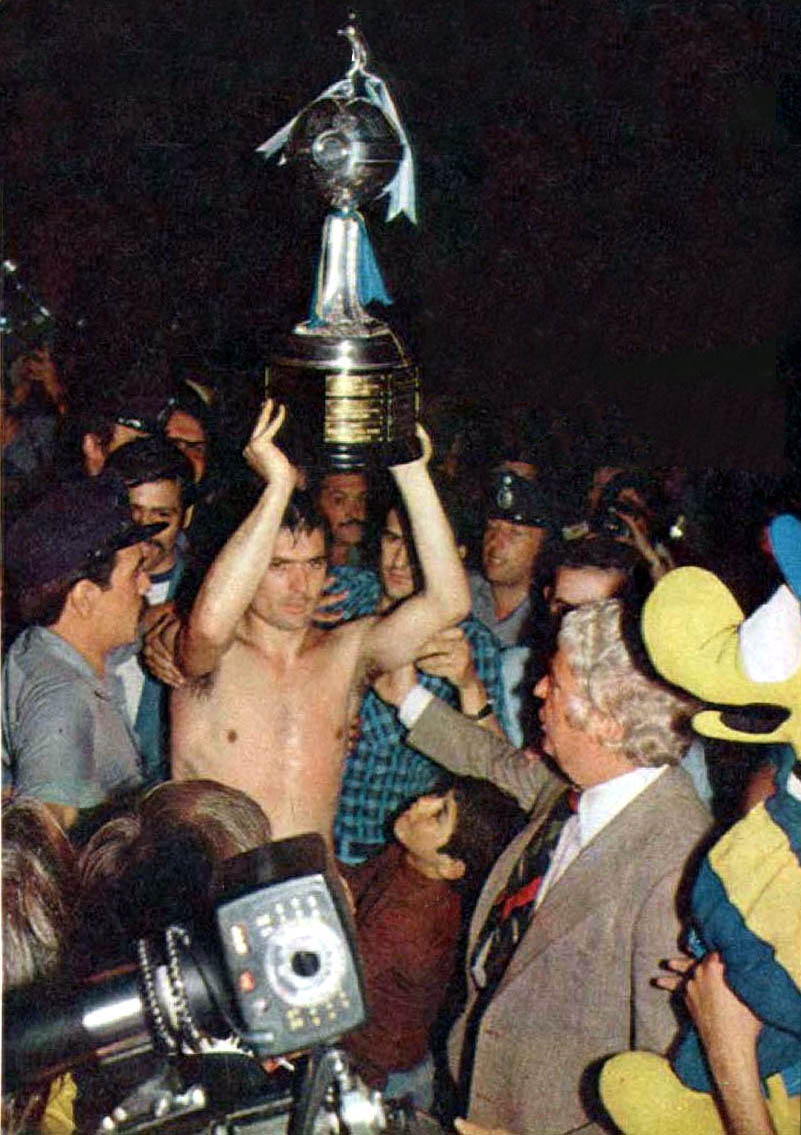
- Boca Juniors, champions
- Event: 1978 Copa Libertadores
Deportivo Cali	Boca Juniors
(Colombia)	(Argentina)
0	4
- Boca Juniors won 3-1 on points.

First leg
Deportivo Cali	Boca Juniors
0	0
- Date: November 23, 1978
- Venue: Estadio Pascual Guerrero, Cali
- Referee: Ortiz (Paraguay)
- Attendance: 50,000

Second leg
Boca Juniors	Deportivo Cali
4	0
- Date: November 28, 1978
- Venue: La Bombonera, Buenos Aires
- Referee: Pérez (Peru)
- Attendance: 80,000

The 1978 Copa Libertadores finals was the final two-legged tie to determine the 1978 Copa Libertadores champion. It was contested by Argentine club Boca Juniors (which had entered directly to semifinals as 1977 champion) and Colombian club Deportivo Cali. The first leg of the tie was played on November 23 at Deportivo Cali' home field, with the second leg played on November 28 at Boca Juniors'. It was Deportivo Cali's 1st Copa Libertadores finals and the 3rd finals for Boca Juniors.

Boca Juniors won the series after winning the second leg tie 4-0 at Buenos Aires's La Bombonera and accumulated more points than their opponent.

== Qualified teams ==
Team	Previous finals app.
(Colombia) Deportivo Cali	None
(Argentina) Boca Juniors	1963, **1977**

Bold indicates winning years

== Rules ==
The finals will be played over two legs; home and away. The team that accumulates the most points —two for a win, one for a draw, zero for a loss— after the two legs will be crowned the champion. If the two teams are tied on points after the second leg, a playoff in a neutral venue will become the next tie-breaker. Goal difference is going to be used as a last resort.

== Venues ==
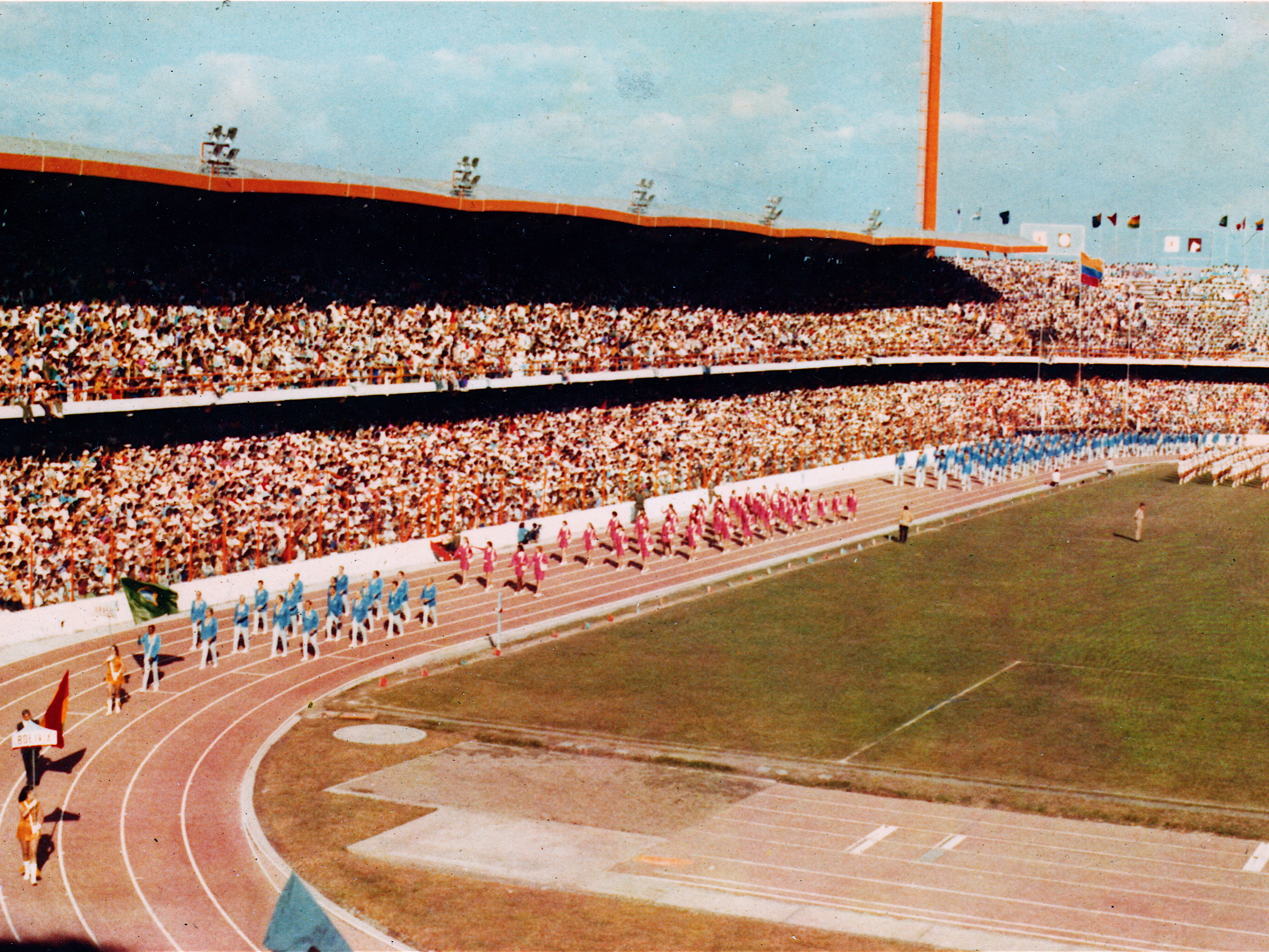
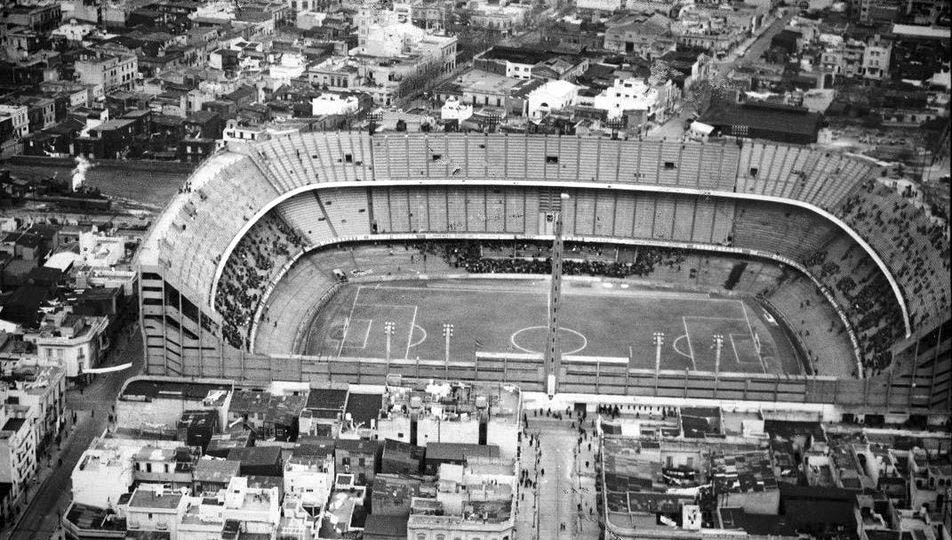
Estadio Pascual Guerrero and La Bombonera were the venues of the finals

== Road to the final ==
- Note: In all results below, the score of the finalist is given first (H: home; A: away).

(Colombia) Deportivo Cali		Round	(Argentina) Boca Juniors	
Opponent	Result	Group stage	Opponent	Result
(Colombia) Junior	0–0 (A)	Matchday 1	–	–
(Uruguay) Peñarol	1–0 (H)	Matchday 2	–	–
(Uruguay) Danubio	2–0 (H)	Matchday 3	–	–
(Colombia) Junior	0–0 (H)	Matchday 4	–	–
(Uruguay) Peñarol	2–0 (A)	Matchday 5	–	–
(Uruguay) Danubio	3–0 (A)	Matchday 6	–	–
**Group 4 winners**: Team / Pld / W / D / L / GF / GA / GD / Pts; (Colombia) Deportivo Cali / 6 / 3 / 2 / 1 / 10 / 3 / +7 / **8**; (Uruguay) Peñarol / 6 / 3 / 0 / 3 / 6 / 5 / +1 / **6**; (Colombia) Junior / 6 / 1 / 4 / 1 / 4 / 5 / −1 / **6**; (Uruguay) Danubio / 6 / 1 / 2 / 3 / 2 / 9 / −7 / **4**; Source: RSSSF		Final standings	As current champions, Boca Juniors started to compete directly in semifinals	
Opponent	Result	Semifinals	Opponent	Result
(Paraguay) Cerro Porteño	1–1 (H)	Matchday 1	(Argentina) River Plate	0–0 (H)
(Peru) Alianza Lima	3–2 (H)	Matchday 1	(Brazil) Atlético Mineiro	2–1 (A)
(Peru) Alianza Lima	4–1 (A)	Matchday 3	(Brazil) Atlético Mineiro	3–1 (H)
(Paraguay) Cerro Porteño	4–0 (A)	Matchday 4	(Argentina) River Plate	2–0 (A)
**Group B**: Team / Pld / W / D / L / GF / GA / GD / Pts; (Colombia) Deportivo Cali / 4 / 3 / 1 / 0 / 12 / 4 / +8 / **7**; (Paraguay) Cerro Porteño / 4 / 1 / 1 / 2 / 4 / 9 / −5 / **3**; (Peru) Alianza Lima / 4 / 1 / 0 / 3 / 7 / 10 / −3 / **2**; Source: RSSSF		Final standings	**Group A**: Team / Pld / W / D / L / GF / GA / GD / Pts; (Argentina) Boca Juniors / 4 / 3 / 1 / 0 / 7 / 2 / +5 / **7**; (Argentina) River Plate / 4 / 1 / 1 / 2 / 1 / 3 / −2 / **3**; (Brazil) Atlético Mineiro / 4 / 1 / 0 / 3 / 3 / 6 / −3 / **2**; Source: RSSSF	

== Match details ==
=== First leg ===
1978 Copa Libertadores
November 23, 1978
First leg

Deportivo Cali (Colombia)	0–0	(Argentina) Boca Juniors
	Report

Estadio Pascual Guerrero, Cali
Attendance: 45,000
Referee: Héctor Ortiz (Paraguay)

**Deportivo Cali**	**Boca Juniors**

GK	**1**	(Colombia) Pedro Zape
DF		(Colombia) William Ospina
DF	**3**	(Colombia) Fernando Castro	(substituted off) 57'
DF		(Colombia) Henry Caicedo
DF		(Colombia) Miguel Escobar (c)
MF		(Colombia) César Valverde
MF		(Colombia) Rafael Otero	(substituted off) 68'
MF		(Argentina) Ángel Landucci
FW		(Argentina) Hector Achilli
FW		(Argentina) José Fernández
FW		(Colombia) Angel Torres
Substitutes:
MF		(Colombia) Heriberto Correa	(substituted on) 57'
MF		(Colombia) Héctor Jaramilo	(substituted on) 68'
Manager:
(Argentina) Carlos Bilardo

GK	24	(Argentina) Carlos Rodríguez
DF	4	(Argentina) Vicente Pernía
DF	2	(Argentina) Francisco Sá
DF	6	(Argentina) Roberto Mouzo
DF	3	(Argentina) Miguel Bordón
MF	8	(Argentina) Jorge Benítez
MF	5	(Argentina) Rubén Suñé (c)
MF	18	(Argentina) Mario Zanabria
FW	7	(Argentina) Ernesto Mastrángelo
FW	17	(Argentina) Carlos Horacio Salinas
FW	22	(Argentina) Hugo Perotti
Manager:
(Argentina) Juan Carlos Lorenzo

=== Second leg ===
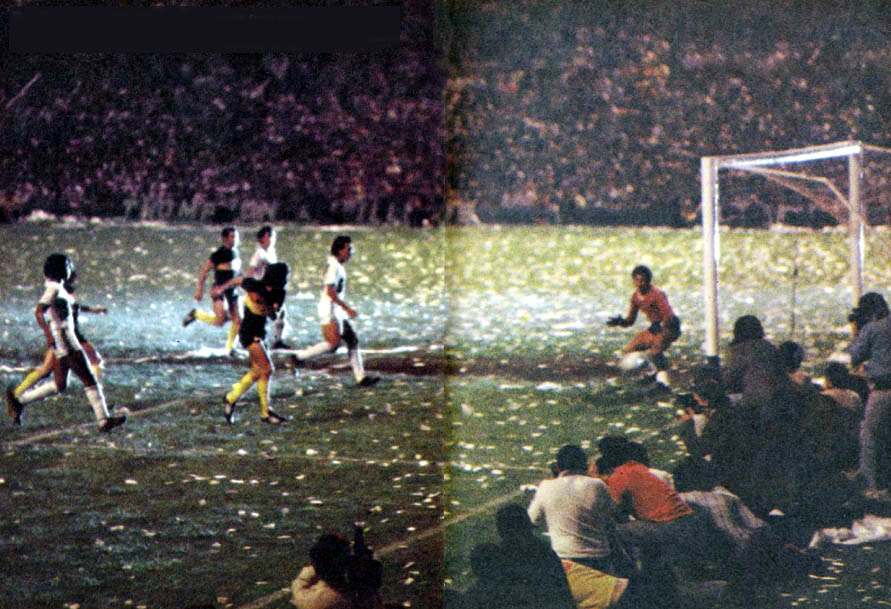
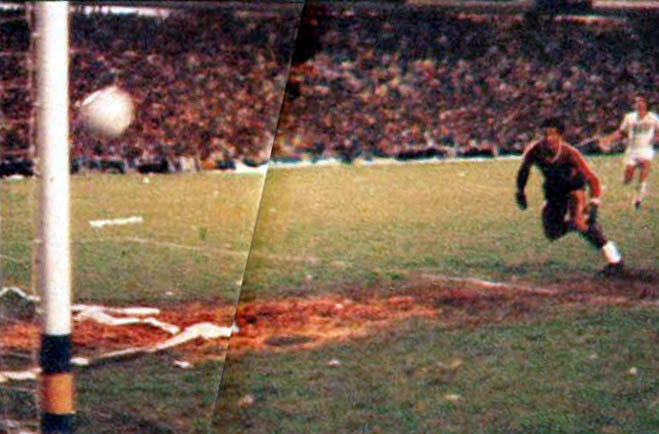
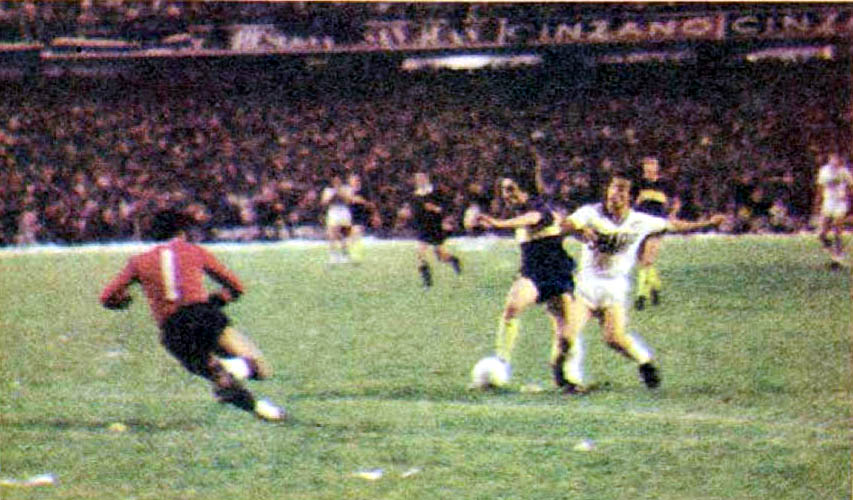
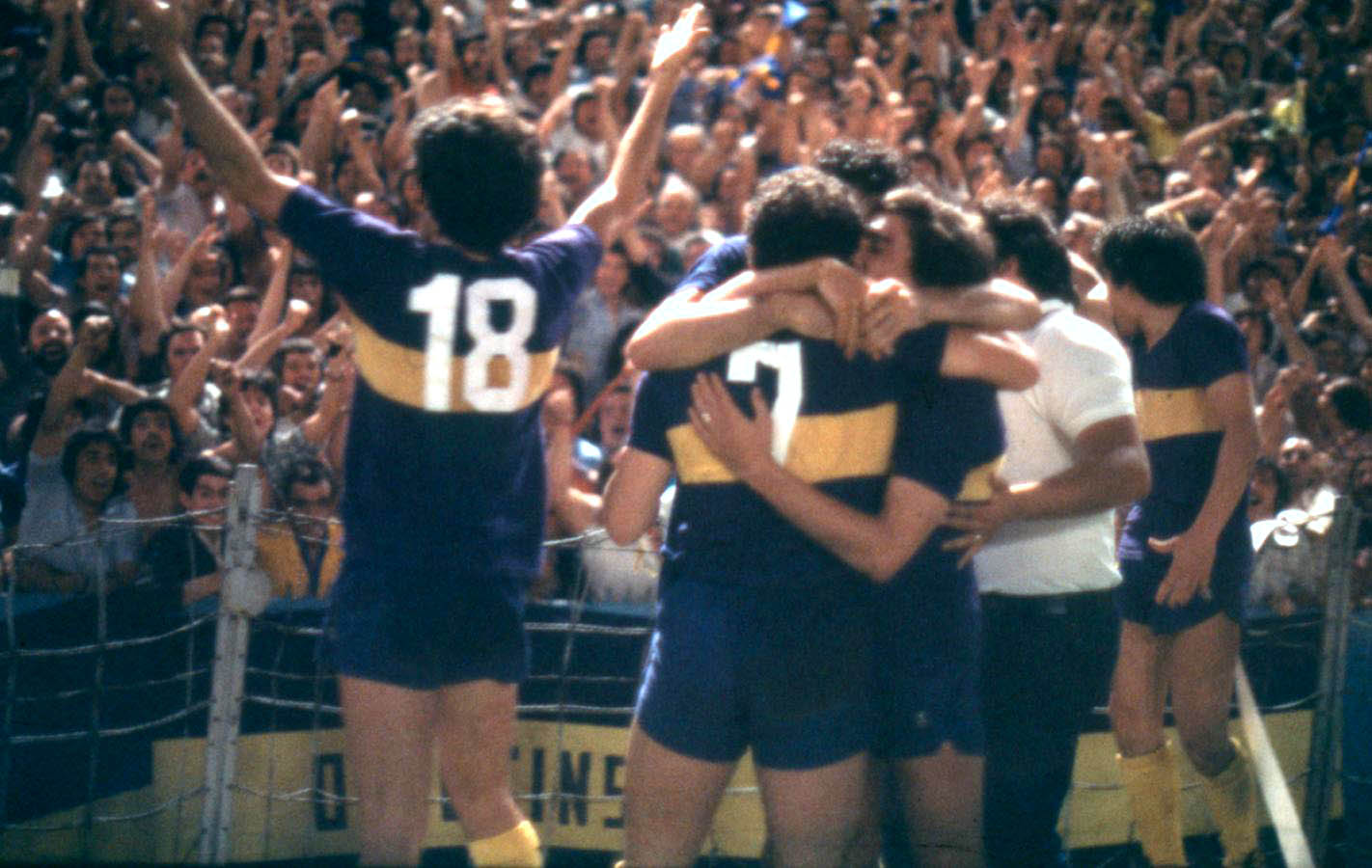
Some of the scoring moments of the match, fltr: Perotti (1st goal), Mastrángelo (2nd), and Salinas (third); on the left, Zanabria (18) and Mastrángelo (7) celebrating with their fans
November 28, 1978
Second leg

Boca Juniors (Argentina)	4–0	(Colombia) Deportivo Cali
Perotti 15', 81'; Mastrángelo 60'; Salinas 71'

La Bombonera, Buenos Aires
Attendance: 55,000
Referee: Edison Peréz (Peru)

**Boca Juniors**	**Deportivo Cali**

GK	1	(Argentina) Hugo Gatti
DF	4	(Argentina) Vicente Pernía
DF	2	(Argentina) Francisco Sá
DF	6	(Argentina) Roberto Mouzo
DF	3	(Argentina) Miguel Bordón
MF	8	(Argentina) Jorge Benítez	(substituted off) 89'
MF	5	(Argentina) Rubén Suñé (c)
MF	18	(Argentina) Mario Zanabria
FW	7	(Argentina) Ernesto Mastrángelo
FW	17	(Argentina) Carlos Horacio Salinas
FW	22	(Argentina) Hugo Perotti
Substitutes:
FW	9	(Argentina) Carlos Veglio	(substituted on) 89'
Manager:
(Argentina) Juan Carlos Lorenzo

GK	**1**	(Colombia) Pedro Zape
DF		(Colombia) William Ospina	(substituted off) 52'
DF	**3**	(Colombia) Miguel Escobar (c)
DF		(Colombia) Henry Caicedo
DF		(Colombia) Heriberto Correa
MF		(Colombia) César Valverde
MF		(Colombia) Rafael Otero	(substituted off) 46'
MF		(Argentina) Ángel Landucci
FW		(Argentina) Néstor Scotta
FW		(Argentina) Alberto J. Benítez
FW		(Colombia) Ángel Torres
Substitutes:
MF		(Colombia) Diego Umaña	(substituted on) 46'
DF		(Colombia) Fernando Castro	(substituted on) 52' (red card) 89'
Manager:
(Argentina) Carlos Bilardo
