= Mario Roberto Carballo =

Argentinian footballer (born 1952)

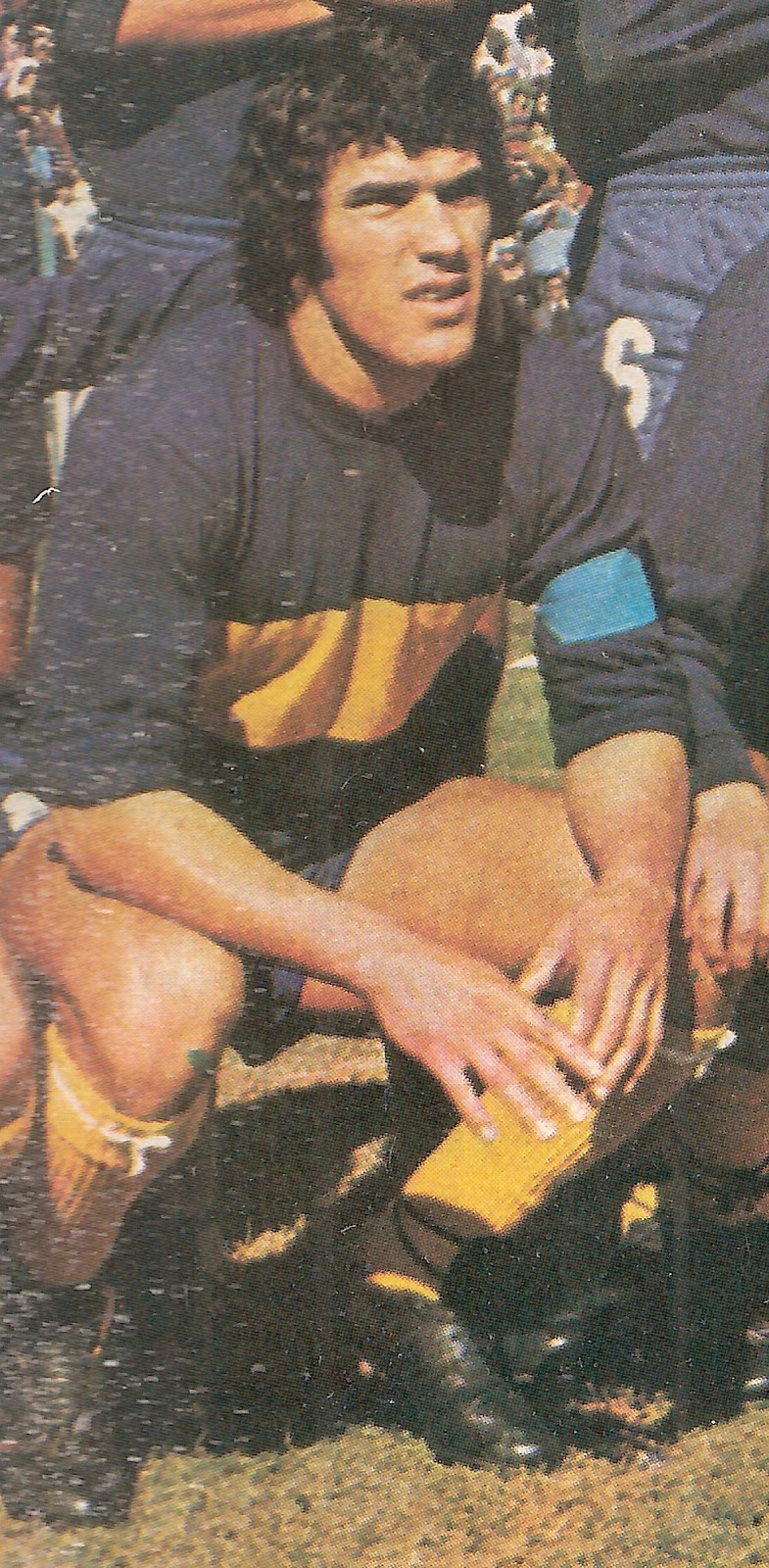
- Carballo in 1977

Personal information
- Full name: Mario Roberto Carballo
- Date of birth: 25 March 1952 (age 74)
- Place of birth: Córdoba, Córdoba Province, Argentina
- Position: Forward

Youth career
- 1967–1969: Racing Club

Senior career*
Years	Team	Apps	(Gls)
1970–1972	Talleres	3	
1973	Instituto	8	
1974–1975	Belgrano	34	(6)
1976	Atlanta		
1977	Boca Juniors	16	
1978	Chacarita Juniors	11	
1979–1983	Unión Magdalena		
1984	Ferro de General Pico		
1985	Pico		
- * Club domestic league appearances and goals

Mario Roberto Carballo (born 25 March 1952) is an Argentinian retired football player. Throughout the 1970s, he played for several clubs including Boca Juniors, where he was part of the winning squad for the 1977 Copa Libertadores as well as for Colombian club Unión Magdalena.

== Club career ==
Carballo began his career by playing for the youth sector of Racing Club from 1967 to 1969 where he only played in three matches. For the 1970 Argentina Primera División, he played for Talleres where he also played an additional three matches. He found more activity in playing for Instituto for the 1973 Argentine Primera División before finding his first major role in his participation with Belgrano where over the course of his initial participation in the 1974 and 1975 seasons, he played 34 matches for the club and scored six goals. After being bought to play for Atlanta in the 1976 season, he was purchased to play for Boca Juniors in the 1977 Argentine Primera División where he participated in 16 matches where he part of the squad to win the club's first ever title at the 1977 Copa Libertadores but was unable to play in the 1977 Intercontinental Cup due to injury. Afterwards, he played for Chacarita Juniors where he played in 11 matches in 1978 before going abroad to play for Unión Magdalena for the next few seasons beginning in 1979 where he played alongside a young Carlos Valderrama. Upon returning to Córdoba in 1984, his former teammate at Boca Juniors, Jorge Ribolzi convinced him to play for Ferro de General Pico where the club played in the 1984 Campeonato Nacional and be part of the winning squad for the 1983-84 Regional Tournament. He played his final season for Pico before retiring in 1985.
