= Jorge Ribolzi =

Argentine footballer and coach

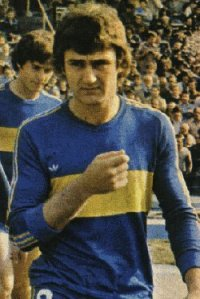
- Ribolzi in 1980

Personal information
- Full name: Jorge Daniel Ribolzi
- Date of birth: January 25, 1953 (age 73)
- Place of birth: Ramos Mejía, Argentina

Senior career*
Years	Team	Apps	(Gls)
1972–75	Atlanta		
1976−78	Boca Juniors		
1978	Dep. La Coruña		
1979	Belgrano (C)		
1978	Dep. La Coruña		
1980–81	Boca Juniors		
1982	Atlanta		
1983	Unión Magdalena		
1984	Ferro C. Oeste (Gral. Pico)		
- * Club domestic league appearances and goals

Jorge Daniel Ribolzi (born 25 January 1953), also known for his nickname "Ruso", is an Argentine former footballer and current coach. His position on the field was midfielder.

== Biography ==
Raised from the Club Atlético Atlanta's youth division (where he received the nickname Ruso), Ribolzi debuted in Primera División in 1972 at the age of 19, playing as forward. Nevertheless, it was not until 1973 when coach Néstor Rossi included Ribolzi in the starting line-up. With Ribolzi as a consolidated player of the team, Atlanta reached the semi-finals of the 1973 Nacional championship, losing to Rosario Central coached by Carlos Griguol.

Ribolzi came to Boca Juniors in 1976, by a request of manager Juan Carlos Lorenzo who had been hired by the club that same year. Ribolzi came along with other players such as Ernesto Mastrángelo, Hugo Gatti, who formed the basement of the team that would win the first Copa Libertadores for the club one year later. Under Lorenzo's coaching, Ribolzi played as attacking midfielder along with Jorge Chino Benítez and Rubén Suñé, the other two players that were part of the Boca Juniors midfield by then.

Playing for Boca Juniors, Ribolzi won a total of 5 championships in two years, with 3 league and 2 international titles, including the 1977, 1978 Copa Libertadores and the Intercontinental Cup won to Borussia Mönchengladbach in Germany.

After finishing his career as footballer, Ribolzi worked as assistant coach with Alfio Basile during the Coco tenure on Boca Juniors (winning also 5 titles in 2 years). Ribolzi also served as interim coach for the senior squad in 2006 (one of them an official game v. Estudiantes de La Plata).

Ribolzi also served as coach of the youth division of Boca Juniors, then leaving.

== Honours ==
Boca Juniors

- Copa Libertadores: 1977, 1978
- Intercontinental Cup: 1977
- Primera División: 1976 Metropolitano, 1976 Nacional, 1981
