= 1977 Intercontinental Cup =

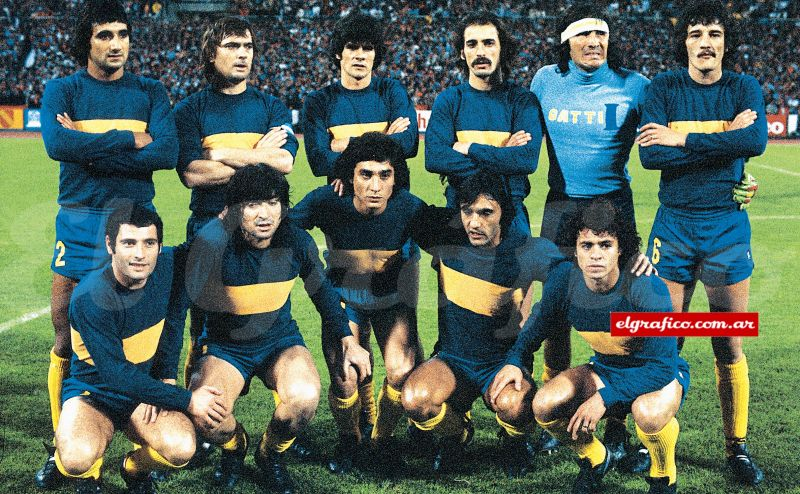
- Boca Juniors, champions
- Event: Intercontinental Cup
Boca Juniors	Borussia Mönchengladbach
(Argentina)	(West Germany)
5	2
- on aggregate

First leg
Boca Juniors	Borussia Mönchengladbach
2	2
- Date: 21 March 1978
- Venue: La Bombonera, Buenos Aires
- Referee: Nikola Milanov Doudine (Bulgaria)
- Attendance: 60,000

Second leg
Borussia Mönchengladbach	Boca Juniors
0	3
- Date: 1 August 1978
- Venue: Wildparkstadion, Karlsruhe
- Referee: Roque Cerullo (Uruguay)
- Attendance: 38,000

The 1977 Intercontinental Cup was an association football tie held over two legs in March and August 1978 between Boca Juniors, winners of the 1977 Copa Libertadores, and Borussia Mönchengladbach, runners-up of the 1976–77 European Cup. European Cup winners Liverpool declined to participate.

== Background ==
As Liverpool declined to participate, Borussia Mönchengladbach was the team appointed to play the series. Due to schedule problems, the Cup was not played until 1978, with the second leg having been held more than four months after the first game in Buenos Aires.

Previously to those series, Borussia had won the Bundesliga three consecutive times (1974–77) with notable players such as Berti Vogts and Danish forward Allan Simonsen, awarded with Ballon d'Or in 1977.

As part of the preparation for the series, Boca Juniors manager, Juan Carlos Lorenzo, sent a friend of his to Borussia's training camp (pretending to be a local journalist due to his knowledge of German language) to watch the team in action. The envoy then sent Lorenzo a detailed report about Borussia's players, their technical characteristics and skills on the field.

== First leg ==
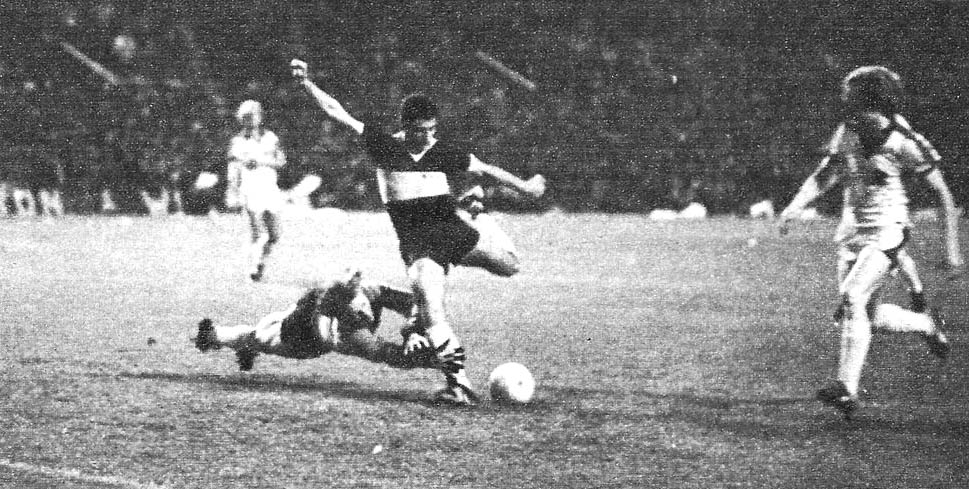
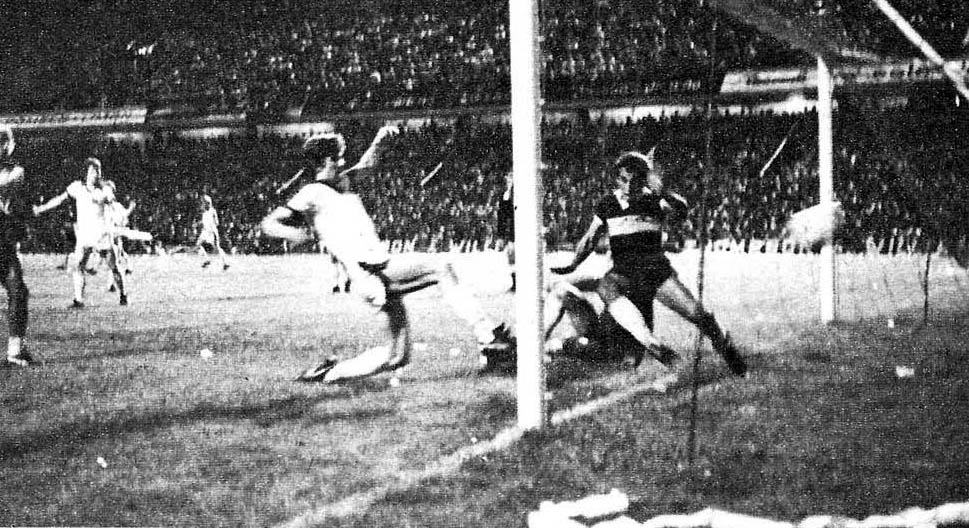
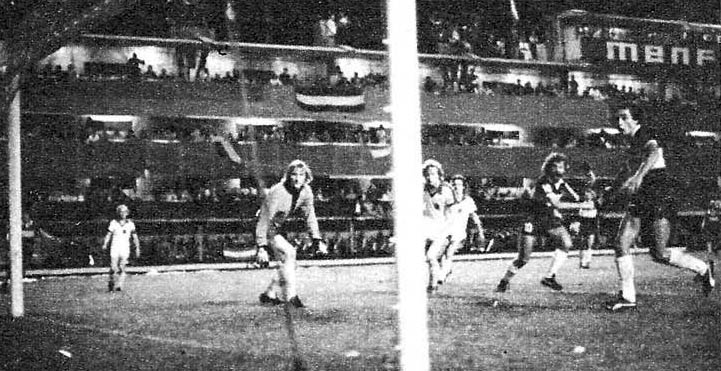
Some goals of the match, fltr: Ernesto Mastrángelo opens for the 1–0, Borussia taking advantage, and Jorge Ribolzi scoring for the 2–2

The first game was held in La Bombonera, with Boca Juniors taking advantage with a goal by Ernesto Mastrángelo, but Borussia scored two goals for a partial 2–1 win until Jorge Ribolzi scored for the 2–2 that would be the final result.

=== Match details ===
21 March 1978

Boca Juniors (Argentina)	2–2	(West Germany) Borussia Mönchengladbach
Mastrángelo 16'; Ribolzi 51'	Report	Hannes 24'; Bonhof 29'

La Bombonera, Buenos Aires
Attendance: 60,000
Referee: Nikola Milanov Doudine (Bulgaria)

Boca Juniors	Borussia Mönchengladbach

GK	12	(Argentina) Osvaldo Santos
DF	4	(Argentina) Vicente Pernía
DF	2	(Argentina) Francisco Sá
DF	6	(Argentina) Roberto Mouzo
DF	3	(Argentina) Miguel Ángel Bordón
MF	8	(Argentina) Jorge Benítez	(substituted off) 46'
MF	5	(Argentina) Rubén Suñé (c)
MF	18	(Argentina) Mario Zanabria
FW	7	(Argentina) Ernesto Mastrángelo
FW	21	(Argentina) Daniel Severino Pavón	(substituted off) 64'
FW	17	(Argentina) Carlos Horacio Salinas
Substitutes:
MF	10	(Argentina) Jorge Ribolzi	(substituted on) 46'
FW	22	(Argentina) Carlos Alberto Álvarez	(substituted on) 64'
Manager:
(Argentina) Juan Carlos Lorenzo

GK	1	(West Germany) Wolfgang Kleff
DF	2	(West Germany) Berti Vogts (c)
DF	3	(West Germany) Wilfried Hannes
DF	4	(West Germany) Horst Wohlers
DF	5	(West Germany) Rainer Bonhof
MF	6	(West Germany) Winfried Schäfer
FW	7	(West Germany) Karl Del'Haye
MF	8	(West Germany) Herbert Wimmer	(substituted off) 56'
FW	9	(Denmark) Carsten Nielsen
MF	10	(West Germany) Christian Kulik
FW	11	(West Germany) Ewald Lienen
Substitutes:
MF	12	(West Germany) Dietmar Danner	(substituted on) 56'
Manager:
(West Germany) Udo Lattek

== Second leg ==
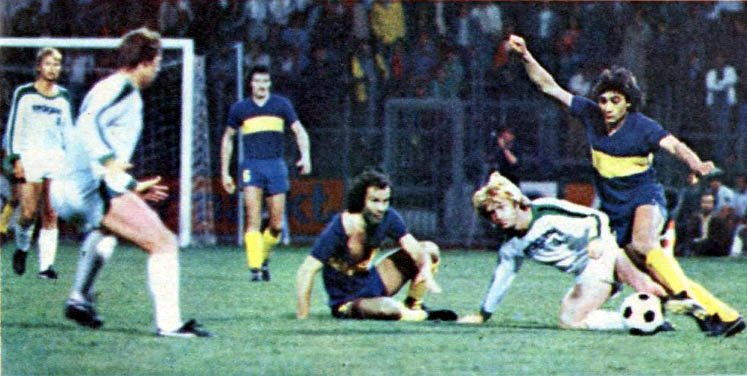
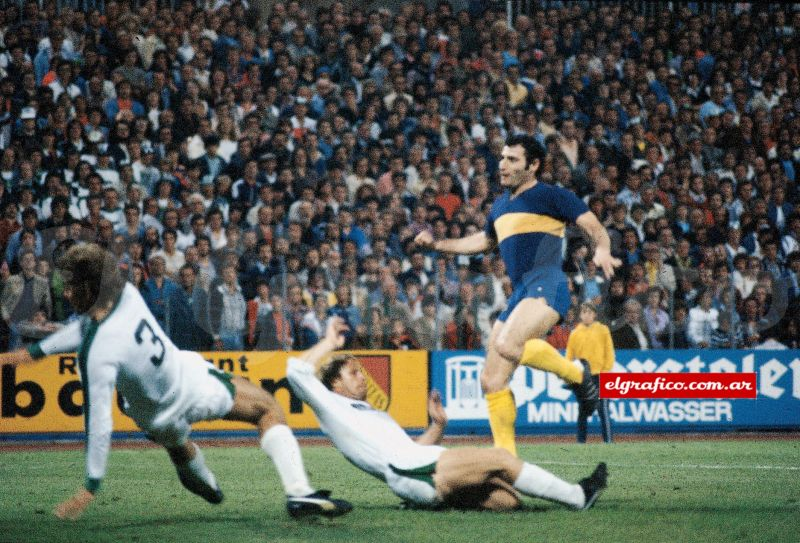
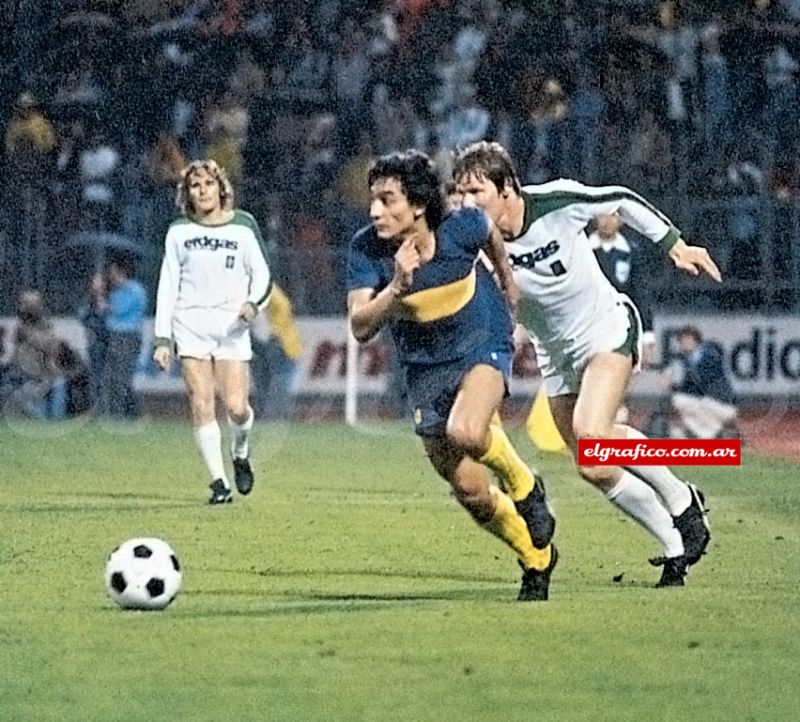
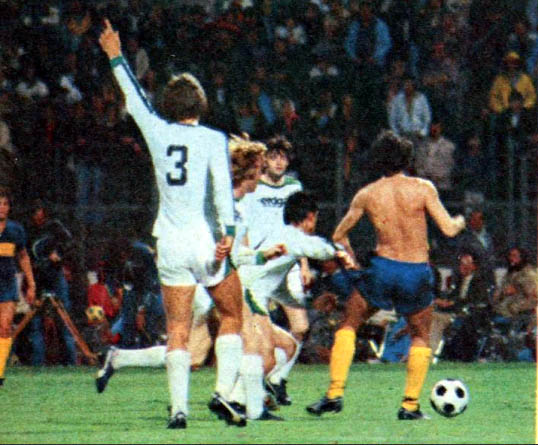
Some moments of the match, fltr: Struggling for the ball, Ernesto Mastrángelo scoring the second goal, Carlos Salinas running with the ball, and Carlos Veglio without his shirt

In October, Boca Juniors travelled to Germany to play the second leg, with the media being sceptical about a victory there. As Borussia's stadium was being refurbished, the match played at Wildparkstadion, which was remarkable for being the stadium with the best lighting throughout Germany by then.

Coach Juan Carlos Lorenzo surprised everyone when he decided to replace Francisco Sá, an experienced but slow player (with 33 years old) by younger and faster José Luis Tesare. He also put three attacking players (resulting in a 4–3–3 formation), something infrequent by those times.

The plan designed by Lorenzo was a real aim so Boca Juniors scored three goals for a 3–0 (Felman, Mastrángelo and Salinas) at the end of first half. Nevertheless, during the first 15 minutes of the match Borussia played much better than Boca Juniors but the German match could not score a goal in despite their dominance over their rival.

One of the key players of the match was Darío Felman, who also scored a goal. Felman, on loan to Valencia CF by then, had not attend the first game in La Bombonera but Alberto J. Armando convinced him to play the second leg. Felman gave Ernesto Mastrángelo a precise pass to score the second goal of the match.

At the end of the match, Borussia manager, Udo Lattek stated that "Boca Juniors was a more mature and intelligent team than us".

=== Match details ===
1 August 1978

Borussia Mönchengladbach (West Germany)	0–3	(Argentina) Boca Juniors
	Report	Felman 2'; Mastrángelo 33'; Salinas 37'

Wildparkstadion, Karlsruhe
Attendance: 38,000
Referee: Roque Cerullo (Uruguay)

Borussia Mönchengladbach	Boca Juniors

GK	(West Germany) Wolfgang Kneib
DF	(West Germany) Berti Vogts (c)
DF	(West Germany) Wilfried Hannes
DF	(West Germany) Horst Wohlers	(substituted off) 46'
DF	(West Germany) Norbert Ringels
MF	(West Germany) Hans-Günter Bruns
FW	(Denmark) Allan Simonsen
MF	(Denmark) Carsten Nielsen
FW	(West Germany) Helmut Lausen	(substituted off) 72'
MF	(West Germany) Christian Kulik
FW	(West Germany) Rudi Gores
Substitutes:
MF	(West Germany) Winfried Schäfer	(substituted on) 46'
FW	(West Germany) Ewald Lienen	(substituted on) 72'
Manager:
(West Germany) Udo Lattek

GK	1	(Argentina) Hugo Gatti
DF	4	(Argentina) Vicente Pernía
DF		(Argentina) José Luis Tesare
DF	3	(Argentina) Miguel Ángel Bordón
DF		(Argentina) José María Suárez
MF	17	(Argentina) Carlos Horacio Salinas
MF	5	(Argentina) Rubén Suñé (c)
MF	18	(Argentina) Mario Zanabria
FW	7	(Argentina) Ernesto Mastrángelo
FW	9	(Argentina) José Luis Saldaño	(substituted off) 46'
FW	11	(Argentina) Darío Felman
Substitutes:
FW		(Argentina) Carlos Veglio	(substituted on) 46'
Manager:
(Argentina) Juan Carlos Lorenzo

== Aftermath ==
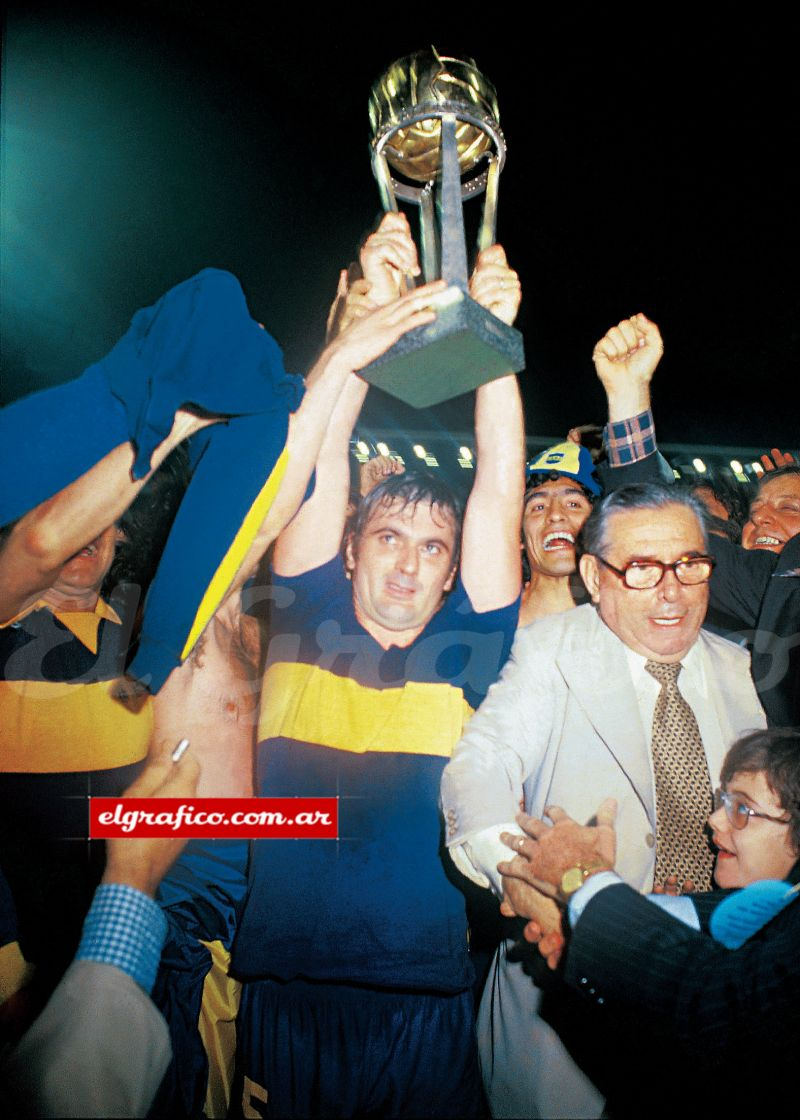
Boca Juniors' captain, Rubén Suñé, raising the trophy. At his left, president of the club, Alberto J. Armando

Boca Juniors's victory was acclaimed throughout Argentina, even by supporters of rival clubs. It was the first intercontinental title for the club and the third for a big five club of Argentina after the victories of Racing and Independiente in 1967 and 1973 respectively.

After their return from Germany, Boca Juniors players went directly to the club so they had to play Newell's Old Boys in the Metropolitano tournament, which would be finally won by Quilmes.

Nobody believed in us. I sent an assistant to spy on Borussia's preseason and that helped me draw conclusions. I knew they were going to be tough and that I had to put a fast team on the field

— Juan Carlos Lorenzo, after winning the Cup.

== See also ==
- 1976–77 European Cup
- 1977 Copa Libertadores
