= Carlos Horacio Salinas =

Argentinian footballer (1956–2026)

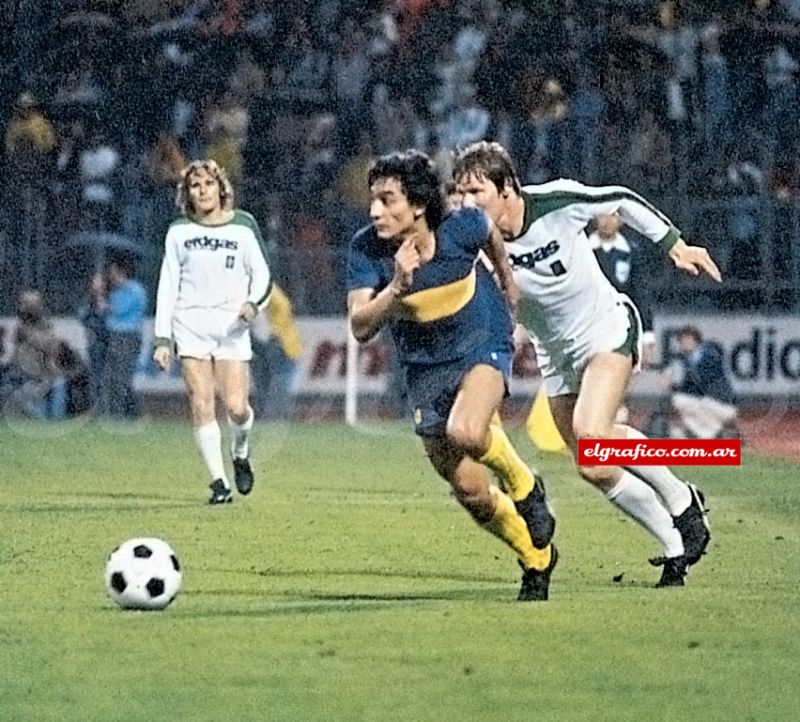
- Salinas in 1978

Personal information
- Full name: Carlos Horacio Salinas
- Date of birth: 26 May 1956
- Place of birth: San Miguel de Tucumán, Tucumán Province, Argentina
- Date of death: 1 September 2026 (aged 70)
- Place of death: Buenos Aires, Argentina
- Position: Midfielder

Senior career*
| Years | Team | Apps | (Gls) |
| 1974–1975 | River Plate | | |
| 1976–1977 | Chacarita Juniors | | |
| 1978–1980 | Boca Juniors | | |
| 1981 | Argentinos Juniors | | |
| 1981–1982 | Independiente | | |
| 1982 | Independiente Medellín | | |
| 1983 | Deportivo Pereira | | |
| 1984 | Fort Lauderdale Sun (indoor) | | |
| 1984 | Alumni de Villa María | | |
| 1985 | Independiente Medellín | | |
| 1985–86 | Racing de Córdoba | | |
| 1986 | Alumni de Villa María | | |
| 1987 | Deportivo Junín | | |
- * Club domestic league appearances and goals

Carlos Horacio Salinas (26 May 1956 – 1 September 2026) was an Argentine footballer. Nicknamed Loco, he played for a wide variety of clubs across the 1970s and the 1980s. He was notable for being one of few footballers to play for both River Plate and Boca Juniors throughout his career as well as having an extensive career abroad in Colombia.

== Club career ==
Salinas was born at San Miguel de Tucumán on 26 May 1956, as the son of a train guard and restaurant chef. His older brother, Domingo Ricardo Salinas, also became a footballer who was known as the captain for Gimnasia y Esgrima de Jujuy. He would try to convince the club to sign Carlos on for the club, but this venture was ultimately short-lived. However, he soon caught the attention of River Plate as he made his club debut in a friendly against the Argentina national football team. He soon made his official senior debut throughout the 1974 Campeonato Metropolitano though River Plate wouldn't win the Metropolitano nor the Nacional that season. His career within River Plate would be marred with controversy however as during the 1975 season, following a Superclásico match that ended 1–1, he exchanged jerseys with Marcelo Trobbiani and was later spotted in a nearby coffee shop adorning the Boca Juniors jersey. Despite being sent to Chacarita Juniors, he demonstrated his talents nonetheless and would continue his development as a player.

Ironically, Salinas would later sign with Boca Juniors during their 1978 season under Juan Carlos Lorenzo. The club had won the 1977 Copa Libertadores and were aiming to win a second consecutive title in the 1978 Copa Libertadores, achieving this goal following a 4–0 victory over Deportivo Cali in the second legged match at the 1978 Copa Libertadores finals with Salinas himself scoring in the match, having scored in the semi final stage of the competition in a 2–0 win against his former club of River Plate. He also partook in both legs of the 1977 Intercontinental Cup where he scored the third goal in a 0–3 away victory. Within the domestic league, Salinas held the title for being given the harshest penalty of a 25-game absence for a single infraction by referee Abel Gnecco during a match against Huracán. The club nearly achieved three titles in a row during the 1979 Copa Libertadores though they were defeated by Paraguayan club Olimpia in the 1979 Copa Libertadores finals..

Following his career with Boca Juniors, he had brief stints with Independiente and Argentinos Juniors, notably playing alongside Diego Maradona in the latter in 1981 and helping the club avoid relegation. He then had his first years playing abroad in Colombia for Independiente Medellín and Deportivo Pereira. He also enjoyed a brief tenure within American indoor soccer for Fort Lauderdale Sun during the 1984 United Soccer League before returning to Argentina to play for Alumni de Villa María. He later returned to play for Independiente Medellín though this was short lived as he was later arrested during a party as the Colombian police had suspected him of alleged possession and marketing of drugs. He then played for Racing de Córdoba throughout the entire 1985–86 Argentine Primera División. Following another brief stay with Villa María, Salinas retired following the 1987 Torneo Descentralizado in Peru for Deportivo Junín.

== Death ==
Salinas died in his home at Buenos Aires, on 1 September 2026, at the age of 70.
