= Darío Felman =

Argentine footballer and manager

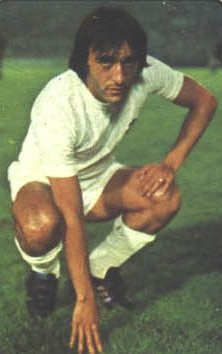

Personal information
- Full name: Darío Luis Felman
- Date of birth: October 25, 1951 (age 75)
- Place of birth: Mendoza, Argentina
- Position: Striker

Senior career*
Years	Team	Apps	(Gls)
1970–1973	Gimnasia de Mendoza		
1973–1974	Independiente Rivadavia		
1975–1978	Boca Juniors	103	(25)
1978–1983	Valencia	121	(18)
1984	Gimnasia de Mendoza		

International career
1977	Argentina	1	(0)

Managerial career
- 2003–2004: Independiente Rivadavia
- * Club domestic league appearances and goals as of October 2008

Darío Luis Felman (born 25 October 1951) is a retired Argentine football striker who won the Copa Libertadores and Intercontinental Cup with Boca Juniors in 1977.

== Club career ==
Felman started his career at Gimnasia y Esgrima de Mendoza in 1970 and is considered to have been one of the best footballers ever to play for the club. In 1974, he joined Independiente Rivadavia.

In 1975, he joined Boca Juniors and in 1976 he was part of the team that won back to back championships. The following season Boca went on to win the Copa Libertadores 1977 and he scored a goal in their 3–0 win over Borussia Mönchengladbach to win the Copa Intercontinental.

In 1978 Felman joined Valencia of Spain where he played alongside fellow Argentine Mario Kempes. In 1979, he was part of the Valencia squad that won the Copa del Rey and in 1980 the club won the UEFA Cup Winners' Cup and the UEFA Super Cup.

In 1984 Felman returned to Argentina and his first team Gimnasia y Esgrima de Mendoza.

== International career ==
In 1976 Felman joined up with Menotti's Selección del Interior and in 1977 he played against Hungary alongside a young Diego Maradona who was making his international debut.

== Managerial career ==
Felman had a brief spell as manager of Independiente Rivadavia, since then he has worked as assistant to Chino Benítez at Boca Juniors and Municipal of Guatemala.

== Titles ==
Boca Juniors

- Argentine Primera División: Metropolitano 1976, Nacional 1976
- Copa Libertadores: 1977
- Intercontinental Cup: 1977 (Note: Actually played on 1 August 1978)

Valencia

- Copa del Rey: 1978–79
- UEFA Cup Winners' Cup: 1979–80
- UEFA Super Cup: 1980
