= Juan Carlos Lorenzo =

Argentine football manager and player (1922–2001)

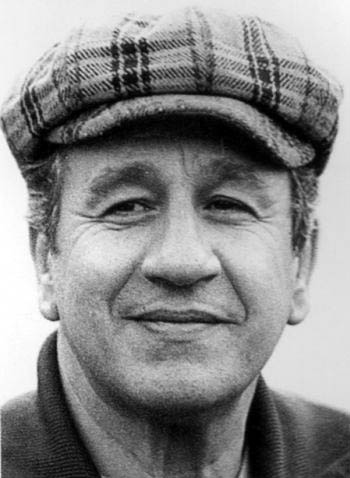
- Lorenzo circa 1987

Personal information
- Full name: Juan Carlos Lorenzo
- Date of birth: 27 October 1922
- Place of birth: Buenos Aires, Argentina
- Date of death: 14 November 2001 (aged 79)
- Place of death: Buenos Aires, Argentina
- Positions: Midfielder; striker

Senior career*
Years	Team	Apps	(Gls)
1940–1945	Chacarita Juniors	79	(20)
1945–1947	Boca Juniors	25	(8)
1947–1952	Sampdoria	77	(19)
1952–1953	Nancy		
1954–1957	Atlético Madrid		
1957–1958	Rayo Vallecano		
1958	Mallorca		

Managerial career
- 1958–1960: Mallorca
- 1961–1962: San Lorenzo
- 1962: Argentina
- 1962–1964: Lazio
- 1964–1965: Roma
- 1965: San Lorenzo
- 1966: Argentina
- 1966: River Plate
- 1967: Mallorca
- 1968–1971: Lazio
- 1972: San Lorenzo
- 1973–1974: Atlético Madrid
- 1975–1976: Unión de Santa Fe
- 1976–1979: Boca Juniors
- 1980: Racing Club
- 1981: Argentinos Juniors
- 1981–1982: San Lorenzo
- 1982: Atlante
- 1982–1983: Vélez Sársfield
- 1983: Atlanta
- 1984: Independiente
- 1984–1985: Lazio
- 1985: San Lorenzo
- 1987: Boca Juniors
- * Club domestic league appearances and goals

Juan Carlos "Toto" Lorenzo (Spanish pronunciation: [xwaŋ ˈkaɾlos loˈɾenso]; 27 October 1922 – 14 November 2001) was an Argentine football player and coach. He became an icon for Boca Juniors fans after he coached the club to its first two Copa Libertadores titles.

== Biography ==
In his teens, Lorenzo played for Chacarita Juniors, and made his professional debut in 1940. He was transferred to Boca Juniors in 1945, and after two years he joined Italian side Sampdoria team, where he remained until 1952. His next clubs would be now-defunct French club Nancy, and Atlético Madrid, Rayo Vallecano and Mallorca, where in 1958 he was coach and player. He then retired from playing, but remained as a coach.

Lorenzo would be the coach that helped Mallorca to promote to Primera División for the first time in 1960.

Influenced by Argentine-Italian Helenio Herrera and riding the wave of his success in Spain, Lorenzo coached Argentina's San Lorenzo in 1961, and coached the Argentina national team in the 1962 FIFA World Cup. Back to Europe, he coached Lazio to Italian first division and coached Roma in 1964. After coaching the Argentine team again for the 1966 FIFA World Cup, he would return to Mallorca, then moving on to Lazio, before winning his first Argentine title (of a total of two) with San Lorenzo in 1972.

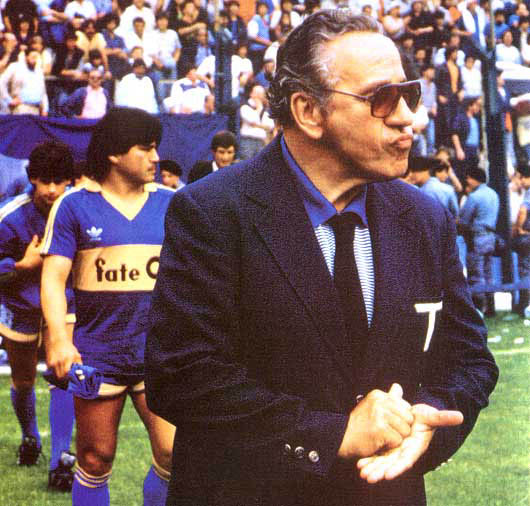
Lorenzo as coach of Boca Juniors in 1987, his second tenure at the club

In 1973, Lorenzo went to Atlético Madrid, who went on to win the league title and lose the 1974 UEFA Champions League final to Bayern Munich. Back in Argentina, he coached recently promoted Santa Fe in 1975. The next year, he returned to Boca Juniors amid great pressure (rivals River Plate had just won back-to-back titles), and started one of the most successful periods in the history of the club. In his four-year tenure, Lorenzo and Boca took two local and three international titles, including the 1977 Intercontinental Cup (played in 1978).

Lorenzo's Boca was anchored by goalkeeper Hugo Gatti, a longtime Boca fan who fulfilled his dream of playing for Boca, and went on to become the player with most appearances in Argentine football history. In the defense, Vicente Pernía in the right and Alberto Tarantini in the left complemented centrals Francisco Sá and Roberto Mouzo. In the center field, reinforcements such as Jorge Ribolzi and Mario Zanabria played alongside veteran Boca players like Jorge Chino Benítez and Rubén Suñé. The attacking line was based on the speed of Ernesto Mastrángelo and Luis Darío Felman.

After that cycle, Lorenzo coached a number of different clubs with less success, including Racing Club, Argentinos Juniors, San Lorenzo, Vélez Sársfield, Atlanta and Lazio, before returning to Boca Juniors in 1987. But his second stint with Boca was brief, and Lorenzo finally retired from coaching.

== Honours ==
=== Player ===
Chacarita Juniors

- Primera B: 1941

Boca Juniors

- Copa Escobar-Gerona: 1945, 1946
- Copa de Competencia Británica: 1946
- Argentine Primera División runner-up: 1945, 1946, 1947

Nancy

- Coupe de France runner-up: 1953

Atlético Madrid

- Copa del Rey runner-up: 1956

=== Manager ===
Mallorca

- Segunda División: 1959–60

Roma

- Coppa Italia: 1963-64

River Plate

- Argentine Primera División runner-up: 1966

Lazio

- Serie B: 1968-69

San Lorenzo

- Primera División: 1972 Metropolitano, 1972 Nacional

Atlético Madrid

- European Cup runner-up: 1973-74
- La Liga runner-up: 1973-74

Boca Juniors

- Primera División: 1976 Metropolitano, 1976 Nacional
- Copa Libertadores: 1977, 1978
- Intercontinental Cup: 1977
- Copa Interamericana runner-up: 1978

Atlanta

- Primera B: 1983
