= Horst Wohlers =

German footballer (born 1949)

Personal information
- Date of birth: 6 August 1949 (age 77)
- Place of birth: Brunsbüttel, West Germany
- Height: 1.80 m (5 ft 11 in)
- Positions: Defender; midfielder

Team information
- Current team: Borussia Mönchengladbach II

Youth career
- SC Brunsbüttelkoog

Senior career*
Years	Team	Apps	(Gls)
1970–1975	FC St. Pauli		
1975–1979	Borussia Mönchengladbach	95	(7)
1980–1982	1860 Munich	84	(14)
1982–1985	Arminia Bielefeld	122	(4)
Total		301	(25)

Managerial career
- 1986–1987: TuS Paderborn-Neuhaus
- 1987–1989: Bayer Uerdingen (assistant)
- 1989–1991: Bayer Uerdingen
- 1991–1992: FC St. Pauli
- 1992–1993: SV Lurup
- 1994–1995: VfB Oldenburg
- 1995–1996: Eintracht Trier
- 1997: Urawa Red Diamonds (assistant)
- 2004–2005: Borussia Mönchengladbach (youth)
- 2005–2010: Borussia Mönchengladbach II
- * Club domestic league appearances and goals

Horst Wohlers (born 6 August 1949) is a German former football player and manager, who played as a defender or midfielder.

== Playing career ==
Wohlers was born in Brunsbüttel, Schleswig-Holstein. He joined first teams of SC Brunsbüttelkoog and FC St. Pauli until his 1975 transfer to Borussia Mönchengladbach. He was a midfielder, who played during Borussia's golden years in the 1970s, when he won with Borussia the Bundesliga two times, the DFB-Pokal once, and the UEFA Cup in 1979. Wohlers made 95 Bundesliga appearances for Mönchengladbach, scoring six times.

He appeared in total 232 times in the Bundesliga, playing also for 1860 Munich and Arminia Bielefeld until he retired from playing in 1985.

== Managerial career ==
After his playing career ended, Wohlers became a coach for Bayer 05 Uerdingen in 1989 assisted by his former colleague Rainer Bonhof. The Danish Football Association (DBU) contacted him in 1990, because he was pointed out as the ideal replacement for another German, Sepp Piontek, by his former teammate Allan Simonsen. Wohlers was even presented as new national coach at a press conference, though he was still under contract at Uerdingen. This led to a public farce in Denmark, because he was never allowed to break his contract at Bayer 05 Uerdingen. Therefore, the later successful Richard Møller Nielsen was appointed as new Danish coach instead.

In 1991, Wohlers became the coach of his former club FC St. Pauli, where his career as Bundesliga coach ended in the same year. He worked for a while as assistant to Horst Köppel in the Japanese J-League with the Urawa Red Diamonds.

In the 2004–05 season, he became the coach of Borussia Mönchengladbach II (or U23), which he led to the German third tier (Regionalliga Nord). His contract ended on 30 June 2010.
