= Rubén Suñé =

Argentine footballer (1947–2019)

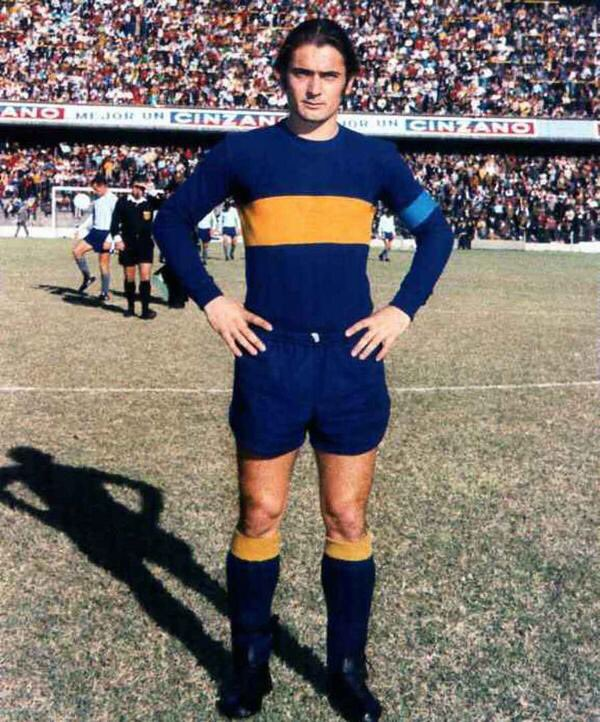
- Suñé c. 1972

Personal information
- Full name: Rubén José Suñé
- Date of birth: 7 March 1947
- Place of birth: Buenos Aires, Argentina
- Date of death: 20 June 2019 (aged 72)
- Place of death: Buenos Aires, Argentina
- Position: Midfielder

Senior career*
Years	Team	Apps	(Gls)
1967–1972	Boca Juniors	186	(32)
1973–1974	Huracán	33	(1)
1975	Unión de Santa Fe	49	(1)
1976–1980	Boca Juniors	131	(2)
1981	San Lorenzo	20	(1)

International career
1969–1973	Argentina	6	(3)

Managerial career
- 1993–1994: Boca Juniors (women)
- 1993–1994: Argentina women
- * Club domestic league appearances and goals

Rubén José Suñé (7 March 1947, Buenos Aires – 20 June 2019) was an Argentine football midfielder who won eight titles with Boca Juniors and also played for the Argentina national team, With the Argentina national team, where he his international debut in 1969 and played a total of six games for the squad.

Suñé is regarded as one of the greatest midfielders and captains in Boca Juniors' history, apart from being one of the idols of the institution. In his two periods with Boca Juniors (1967–72, 1976–80), Suñé played 377 matches, scoring 36 goals. During his entire career, he totalised 527 matches and 52 goals scored.

== Biography ==
Suñé started his professional career in 1967 with Boca Juniors where he was part of the squad that won the 1967 Nacional championship. His first position on the field was right back, then playing as central midfielder (from 1972), which would be his definitive position. When legendary Antonio Rattín retired from football in 1970, Suñé was appointed as Boca Juniors captain.

On 17 March 1971 Suñé was involved in a notorious Copa Libertadores match against Peruvian side Sporting Cristal where all but two of the Boca Juniors players were sent off after an on pitch battle involving all the players except Julio Meléndez and the two goalkeepers. All the players involved in the riot were also arrested. This is considered the biggest scandal in the history of the continental competition. Due to having been one of the main actors in the violent incidents, Suñé was suspended for one year and a half although he would be pardoned by CONMEBOL.

Suñé's career continued in Huracán, where he moved in 1973, then joining Unión de Santa Fe in 1975. Managed by Juan Carlos Lorenzo, Unión made a great campaign in the 1975 Nacional with Suñé, goalkeeper Hugo Gatti, midfielder Victorio Cocco and forwards Ernesto Mastrángelo and Leopoldo Luque among others.

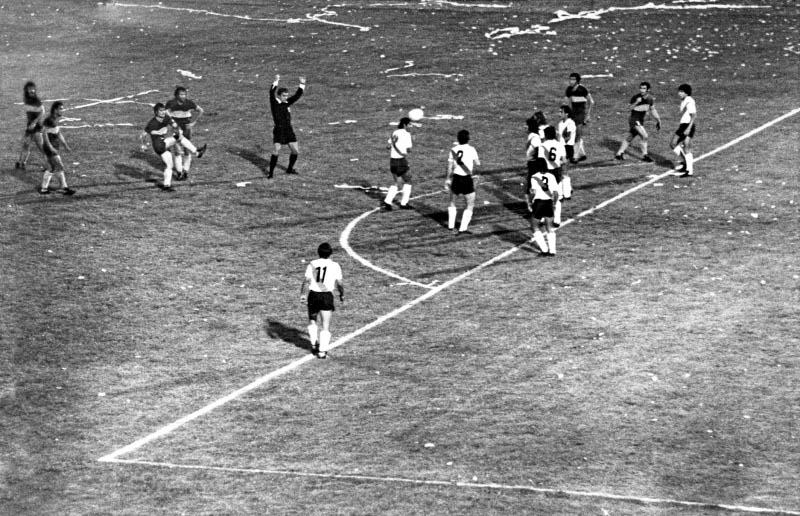
Suñé scoring the free kick vs River Plate. That goal nicknamed "the ghost goal" allowed Boca Juniors to win a new championship in 1976

When Boca Juniors hired Lorenzo in 1976, he brought Suñé back to the club. During the next few years Boca had one of the most successful periods in its history, claiming two Primera División championships, two Copa Libertadores titles and the 1977 Copa Intercontinental.

22 December 1976 was the most remembered day in Suñé's career, when he scored the only goal of the 1976 final vs River Plate after shooting a free kick. The final was held in Racing Club Stadium and Suñé's goal allowed Boca Juniors to win not only the Superclásico but their 20th. league title.

Suñé's professional career ended in 1981 when he joined San Lorenzo for one final season. In 1984, he suffered a bout of severe depression and a suicide attempt, but he recovered and took up a coaching role with the Boca Juniors youth team.

Suñé died at Hospital Británico of Buenos Aires, but the cause of his death is still unclear.

... I can't hide the pride I feel entering the pitch with the captain's band on my arm. Because in some way it represents the Boca Juniors' symbol, a part of representing all my teammates. Being the captain represents a consent from the team, a validation of friendship, a proof of appreciation, of being a good teammate and having values... this distinction, given by my teammates, is a huge compliment for me. Furthermore in an institution (Boca Juniors) which is known worldwide.

— Rubén Suñé talking about his role as captain in an interview

== The "ghost" goal ==
Despite the Boca–River match being broadcast on television, it was believed that there was no surviving record of that goal (only a photographic sequence published by El Gráfico served as approach). Because of that, the goal was popularly known as "the ghost goal". Nevertheless, in November 2019, Boca Juniors announced that a record of that goal had been found.

A short movie depicting some moments prior to the free kick and the goal was screened at the Passion for Boca Juniors Museum of Buenos Aires. The release was attended by a select group of members and former players of the club.

== Titles ==
Boca Juniors

- Copa Argentina (1): 1969
- Primera División (4): 1969 Nacional, 1970 Metropolitano, 1976 Nacional, 1976 Metropolitano
- Copa Libertadores (2): 1977, 1978
- Intercontinental Cup (1): 1977
