= Mario Zanabria =

Argentine former football player (born 1948)

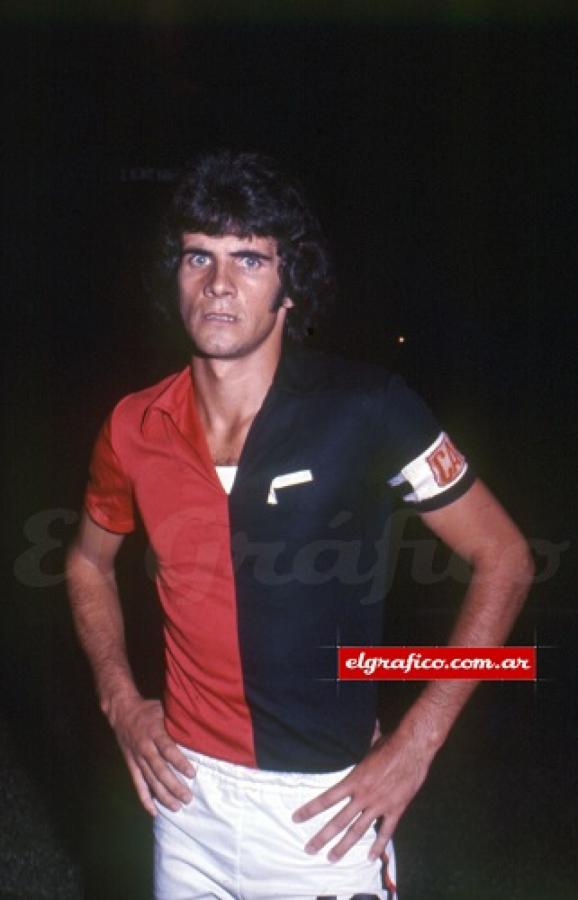
- Mario Zanabria with Newell's Old Boys c. 1974

Personal information
- Full name: Mario Nicasio Zanabria
- Date of birth: 1 October 1948 (age 78)
- Place of birth: Santa Fe, Argentina
- Position: Midfielder

Senior career*
Years	Team	Apps	(Gls)
1967–1969	Unión de Santa Fe	40	(5)
1970–1975	Newell's Old Boys	253	(56)
1976–1980	Boca Juniors	129	(11)
1981	Argentinos Juniors	25	(1)
1982	Boca Juniors	26	(4)
1983	Huracán	24	(1)

International career
1975	Argentina	4	(2)
- * Club domestic league appearances and goals

Mario Nicasio Zanabria (born 1 October 1948 in Santa Fe) is an Argentine former football player, who played as a midfielder. He was in Argentina's squad for the 1975 Copa America.

== Club career ==
A playmaker, Zanabria made his début in the first division in 1967 with Unión de Santa Fe, where he played until 1969. From 1970 to 1975 he excelled with Newell's Old Boys, winning the Metropolitano in 1974. He then moved to Boca Juniors, where he would play until 1980, and then again in 1982, winning the 1976 Nacional and Metropolitano, the 1977 and 1978 Copa Libertadores de América and 1978 Intercontinental Cup under coach Toto Lorenzo. Wearing the #10 jersey, he played a total of 179 matches in all competitions with Boca, scoring 16 goals. In 1981, he played for Argentinos Juniors, and for Huracán in 1983 before retiring.

== Managerial career ==
After retirement he coached several teams, including Boca Juniors (1986), Club Atlas (1992–1993), Newell's Old Boys (1997), Unión de Santa Fe (1998), Lanús (1999), Talleres de Córdoba (2001), Querétaro F.C. (2002) and Vélez Sársfield (2004) and Real España (2008 and 2010).

== Honours ==
=== Player ===
Unión de Santa Fe

- Primera B Metropolitana: 1966

Newell's Old Boys

- Argentine Primera División: 1974

Boca Juniors

- Argentine Primera División: Metropolitano 1976
- Copa Libertadores: 1977, 1978
- Copa Interamericana runner-up: 1977
- Intercontinental Cup: 1977

=== Manager ===
Real C.D. España

- Liga Nacional de Fútbol Profesional de Honduras: 2010 Apertura
