= Jorge Benítez (Argentine footballer) =

Argentine footballer & manager (born 1950)

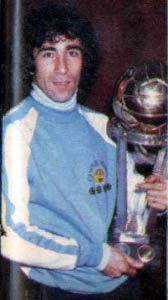
- Benítez with the Intercontinental Cup in 1978

Personal information
- Full name: Jorge José Benítez
- Date of birth: 3 June 1950 (age 76)
- Place of birth: Gobernador Castro, Buenos Aires, Argentina
- Position: Midfielder

Youth career
- Racing Club

Senior career*
Years	Team	Apps	(Gls)
1969–1973	Racing Club	105	(12)
1973–1981	Boca Juniors	305	(40)

International career
1977	Argentina	2	(0)

Managerial career
- 2004–2005: Boca Juniors
- * Club domestic league appearances and goals

Jorge José Benítez (born 3 June 1950 in Gobernador Castro, Buenos Aires Province, Nicknamed El Chino "The Chinese") is an Argentine former football player and manager.

== Career ==
Benítez started his career in Racing Club in 1969; in 1973 he was transferred to Boca Juniors, where he stayed until retirement in 1983. A gifted midfielder, he played 305 league matches and scored 40 goals for Boca, being instrumental in achieving the Metropolitano title in 1976 and 1981, the Nacional in 1976, the Copa Libertadores in 1977 and 1978 and the European/South American Cup in 1977.

Since he shared Boca's midfield with talented players such as Trobbiani, Suñé, Potente, Ribolzi, Berta, Zanabria, Brindisi, and Maradona, his place in the team was often compromised.

After retirement, Benítez worked as junior division coach in Boca Juniors, and was offered the post of main coach in November 2004 upon the resignation of (former teammate) Brindisi due to poor results.

Benítez's first achievement was to stabilize the team's performance, and indeed it went on to win the 2004 Copa Sudamericana. As a result, the board of directors was convinced that he was the right man for the job, and extended the term of his contract, instead of going for a big-name coach.

On 15 July 2005, Benítez was sacked from Boca Juniors, following a poor performance by the team in the Copa Libertadores, and an incident in the quarterfinals match against Chivas de Guadalajara. A review of tape showed the manager spitting at Chivas player Adolfo Bautista a few minutes before the match ended. After being sacked, Benítez sought out Bautista to personally apologize by flying to a Chivas practice at Guadalajara. The apology was accepted but a personal meeting was rejected. The match ended 0-0, but Boca had suffered a 4-0 loss in the first leg. Boca then proceeded to hire former national team coach Alfio Basile for the post.

== Titles ==
All with Boca Juniors

Player

- Primera División: 1976 Met, 1976 Nac, 1981 Met
- Copa Libertadores: 1977, 1978
- Intercontinental Cup: 1977

Manager

- Copa Sudamericana: 2004
