= Roberto Mouzo =

Argentine footballer and manager

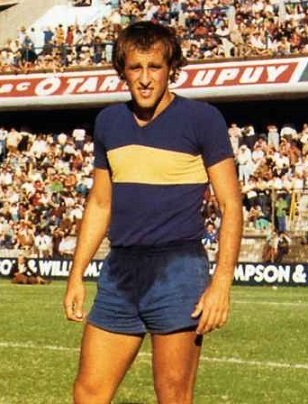
- Mouzo with Boca Juniors in 1976

Personal information
- Date of birth: 8 January 1953 (age 73)
- Place of birth: Avellaneda, Argentina
- Position: Defender

Youth career
- –1971: Boca Juniors

Senior career*
Years	Team	Apps	(Gls)
1971–1984	Boca Juniors	396	(22)
1985	Estudiantes (RC)	8	(1)
1985	Club 9 de Octubre	12	(0)
1986	Atlanta	8	(0)
Total		424	(23)

International career
1974–1983	Argentina	4	(0)
- * Club domestic league appearances and goals

Roberto Mouzo (born 8 January 1953) is an Argentine former professional footballer who played as a defender. Raised from the Boca Juniors youth academy, and having played the vast majority of his career for Boca Juniors, Mouzo is considered one of the great idols of the club. He is the all-time most appearing player for the team, with 426 matches played. Mouzo also won 6 titles with the club, with 25 goals scored.

Mouzo also has the most appearances in Superclásico with 29 matches played (shared with club's legend Silvio Marzolini). He was also capped for the Argentina national team, having played in 1983 Copa América.

== Club career ==
=== Boca Juniors ===
Mouzo started his career in a 0–0 draw with Gimnasia y Esgrima (M) on 11 November 1971. Mouzo went on to make a record 426 appearances for Boca in all competitions, 396 in the Argentine league, making him the player with the most games in the history of Boca Juniors. Mouzo won all of the titles with Boca including the Copa Libertadores of 1977 and 1978.

Mouzo scored 24 goals during his career at Boca, 21 in the league and 3 in the 1977 Copa Libertadores.

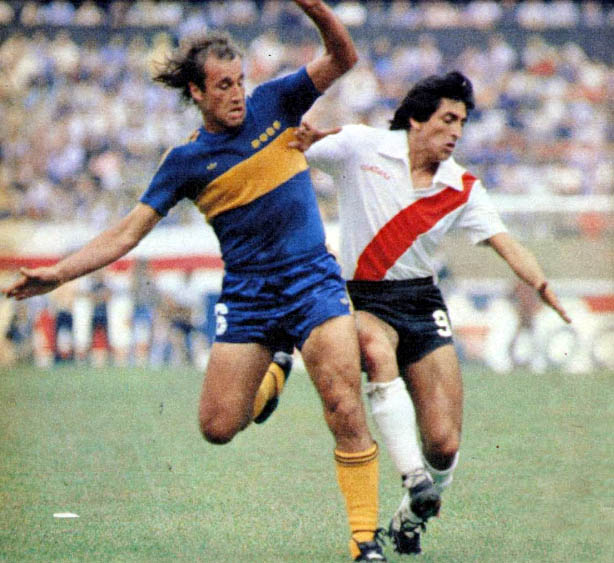
Mouzo fighting for the ball against

In 1984 Mouzo left Boca Juniors due to a conflictive relation with club executives. He made his last appearance for Boca on 16 December in a 2–0 win over Rosario Central. After leaving Boca, Mouzo had short spells with Estudiantes de Río Cuarto, and Club 9 de Octubre in Ecuador before returning to Argentina to finish his career in Atlanta that was competing in Primera B.

Mouzo was part of the team that won the first World Cup of Masters in 1987. His good performance during the tournament called the attention of Brazilian club Vitória which signed Mouzo for 6 months. Nevertheless, he was injured during the pre-season and had to return to Argentina. After he recovered from the injure, Mouzo played in Regional leagues for two years, in Urdinarrain of Gualeguaychú and Deportivo Villa Gesell.

== Managerial career ==
When Mouzo retired from football, he worked as an insurance seller and managed some football academies. Mouzo returned to football as youth coach at Boca Juniors before becoming interim coach (sharing duties with Francisco Sá) in 1996 after the sacking of Carlos Bilardo. Nevertheless, in 2003 he was fired by the Mauricio Macri administration after eight years of work at the club.

In January 2009 with Jorge Amor Ameal as president of Boca Juniors, Mouzo returned to the club after manager Carlos Bianchi offered him to coach the 4th division. After several years of service, Mouzo retired in 2018.

== Personal life ==
In March 2020, Mouzo admitted that he attempted to commit suicide in 2009, soon after his wife died, which brought him a big depression.

== Honours ==
Boca Juniors

- Primera División: 1976 Metropolitano, 1976 Nacional, 1981 Metropolitano
- Copa Libertadores: 1977, 1978
- Intercontinental Cup: 1977

== In his own words ==
I was obsesive... one day, a boy my same age came to make a test at La Candela, it was 1967. He had football boots, but he need a cleat. He worried a lot because he doesn't have another pair, and when you make a test, having your own boots is essential. "I have a cleat, take it", I told him. He thanked me, made a try as defender but he wasn't accepted. About two years ago, reading an interview on Clarín newspaper, this guy said: "Roberto is a great guy, when I was to make a test at Boca Juniors, he lend me a cleat". He was Daniel. I found out a couple of years ago

— Mouzo in an interview with El Gráfico in 2009.
