= Vicente Pernía =

Argentine footballer

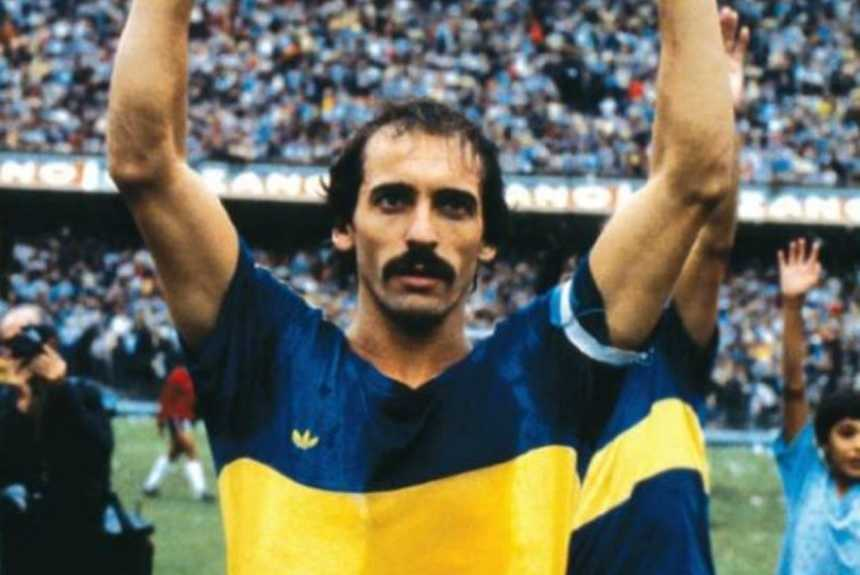
- Pernía playing for Boca Juniors

Personal information
- Full name: Vicente Alberto Pernía
- Date of birth: 25 April 1949 (age 77)
- Place of birth: Tandil, Argentina
- Position: Right back

Senior career*
Years	Team	Apps	(Gls)
1969–1972	Estudiantes de La Plata	53	(0)
1973–1981	Boca Juniors	237	(10)
1982	Vélez Sársfield	19	(1)
Total		309	(11)

International career
1974–1977	Argentina	7	(0)
- * Club domestic league appearances and goals as of August 2007

Vicente Alberto Pernía (born 25 April 1949 in Tandil, Buenos Aires Province), known as El Tano (the Italian, in lunfardo), is an Argentine former professional footballer who played as a defender. He then went on to a second career as a car racing driver.

== Club career ==
El Tano started his football career with Estudiantes de La Plata in 1969, where he played until his transfer to Boca Juniors in 1973. During his time at Boca Pernía, he won a number of titles, including three league titles and two Copa Libertadores. Pernía played a total of 269 games for Boca in all competitions and still holds the record for the Boca player to have been sent off the most times with 13 red cards. After the chain of successes under coach Juan Carlos Lorenzo, he was sold to Vélez Sársfield at the end of 1981 after being left out of new coach Silvio Marzolini's plans.

Pernía retired from playing football in 1982. His son Mariano is also a football player and was a member of the Spain national football team for 2006 FIFA World Cup.

== International career ==
Pernía was widely hailed as the best Argentine right defender of his time, but Argentina national team coach César Menotti chose not to call him to the 1978 FIFA World Cup squad, after some rude altercations in friendly matches, notably a friendly against Scotland played 18 June 1977, when he was sent off for repeated violent fouls against Willie Johnston.

For the main event, Menotti improvised fullback Jorge Olguín in the position. Olguín played both the 1978 and the 1982 FIFA World Cups. It was rumored that the personal preferences of some members of the military junta that ruled Argentina played a part in the decision.

In a popular sketch on TV, comedian Mario Sapag as Menotti would say that Pernía does not fit in his philosophy of play "because he is sad", and he'd rather have Olguín, whose name itself is funny.

== Stock-car racing ==
In the 1980s, Pernía reinvented himself as a stock-car driver in Argentina's TC and TC2000 categories. He won a few races, obtaining in 1996 the Subchampionship of Turismo Carretera.

In 2005, Argentine football giants Boca Juniors and River Plate prepared their own racing teams for the Top Race V6 competition that starts in March 2005. Pernía will, after 14 years, dress again the blue-and-yellow colors of Boca Juniors, along with driving Guillermo Ortelli and Ernesto Bessone.

Another of Pernía's sons, Leonel races in TC2000 and the World Touring Car Championship.

== Honours ==
Boca Juniors

- Argentine Primera División: Metropolitano 1976, Nacional 1976, Metropolitano 1981
- Copa Libertadores: 1977, 1978
- Intercontinental Cup: 1977
