= 1977 Copa Libertadores =

18th season of Copa Libertadores

Tournament details
- Dates: March 9 – September 14
- Teams: 21 (from 10 confederations)

Final positions
- Champions: (Argentina) Boca Juniors (1st title)
- Runners-up: (Brazil) Cruzeiro

Tournament statistics
- Matches played: 75
- Goals scored: 154 (2.05 per match)
- Top scorer: (Argentina) Néstor Scotta (5)

The 1977 Copa Libertadores was the 18th edition of CONMEBOL's top club tournament. The tournament was won by Boca Juniors after defeating defending champions Cruzeiro for their first Copa Libertadores title in a third decisive game. In the two-game finals, both finalists won one game each. A third match therefore had to be played, which remained goalless and Boca Juniors won 5–4 on penalties.

== Qualified teams ==
Country	Team	Qualification method
CONMEBOL (1 berth)	Cruzeiro	1976 Copa Libertadores champion
Argentina (2 berths)	Boca Juniors	1976 Metropolitano champion 1976 Nacional champion
Argentina (2 berths)	River Plate	1976 Copa Libertadores Play-off winner
Bolivia (2 berths)	Bolívar	1976 Primera División champion
Bolivia (2 berths)	Oriente Petrolero	1976 Primera División runner-up
Brazil (2 berths)	Internacional	1976 Campeonato Brasileiro Série A champion
Brazil (2 berths)	Corinthians	1976 Campeonato Brasileiro Série A runner-up
Chile (2 berths)	Everton	1976 Primera División champion
Chile (2 berths)	Universidad de Chile	1976 Liguilla Pre-Libertadores winner
Colombia (2 berths)	Atlético Nacional	1976 Campeonato Profesional champion
Colombia (2 berths)	Deportivo Cali	1976 Campeonato Profesional runner-up
Ecuador (2 berths)	El Nacional	1976 Campeonato Ecuatoriano champion
Ecuador (2 berths)	Deportivo Cuenca	1976 Campeonato Ecuatoriano runner-up
Paraguay (2 berths)	Libertad	1976 Primera División champion
Paraguay (2 berths)	Olimpia	1976 Torneo República champion
Peru (2 berths)	Unión Huaral	1976 Primera División champion
Peru (2 berths)	Sport Boys	1976 Primera División runner-up
Uruguay (2 berths)	Defensor Sporting	1976 Liguilla Pre-Libertadores winner
Uruguay (2 berths)	Peñarol	1976 Liguilla Pre-Libertadores runner-up
Venezuela (2 berths)	Portuguesa	1976 Primera División champion
Venezuela (2 berths)	Estudiantes de Mérida	1976 Primera División runner-up

== Draw ==
The champions and runners-up of each football association were drawn into the same group along with another football association's participating teams. Three clubs from Brazil competed as Cruzeiro was champion of the 1976 Copa Libertadores. They entered the tournament in the Semifinals.

Group 1	Group 2	Group 3	Group 4	Group 5
Argentina; Uruguay	Bolivia; Colombia	Brazil; Ecuador	Chile; Paraguay	Peru; Venezuela

== Group stage ==
=== Group 1 ===
Pos	Team	Pld	W	D	L	GF	GA	GD	Pts	Qualification	(Argentina) BOC	(Argentina) RIV	(Uruguay) DEF	(Uruguay) PEÑ
1	(Argentina) Boca Juniors	6	4	2	0	5	0	+5	10	Qualified to the Semi-finals	—	1–0	2–0	1–0
2	(Argentina) River Plate	6	1	4	1	5	5	0	6		0–0	—	1–1	2–1
3	(Uruguay) Defensor Sporting	6	1	3	2	5	7	−2	5		0–0	0–0	—	2–4
4	(Uruguay) Peñarol	6	1	1	4	7	10	−3	3		0–1	2–2	0–2	—

=== Group 2 ===
Pos	Team	Pld	W	D	L	GF	GA	GD	Pts	Qualification	(Colombia) CAL	(Bolivia) BOL	(Bolivia) ORI	(Colombia) NAC
1	(Colombia) Deportivo Cali	6	4	0	2	12	5	+7	8	Qualified to the Semi-finals	—	3–0	3–0	3–1
2	(Bolivia) Bolívar	6	3	1	2	7	4	+3	7		3–0	—	1–0	3–0
3	(Bolivia) Oriente Petrolero	6	2	1	3	6	7	−1	5		1–0	0–0	—	4–0
4	(Colombia) Atlético Nacional	6	2	0	4	5	14	−9	4		0–3	1–0	3–1	—

=== Group 3 ===
Pos	Team	Pld	W	D	L	GF	GA	GD	Pts	Qualification	(Brazil) INT	(Ecuador) NAC	(Brazil) COR	(Ecuador) CUE
1	(Brazil) Internacional	6	4	1	1	9	4	+5	9	Qualified to the Semi-finals	—	2–0	1–0	3–1
2	(Ecuador) El Nacional	6	3	1	2	6	6	0	7		2–0	—	2–1	0–0
3	(Brazil) Corinthians	6	2	1	3	10	6	+4	5		1–1	3–0	—	4–0
4	(Ecuador) Deportivo Cuenca	6	1	1	4	3	12	−9	3		0–2	0–2	2–1	—

=== Group 4 ===
Pos	Team	Pld	W	D	L	GF	GA	GD	Pts	Qualification	(Paraguay) LIB	(Chile) UCH	(Chile) EVE	(Paraguay) OLI
1	(Paraguay) Libertad	6	3	2	1	10	5	+5	8	Qualified to the Semi-finals	—	3–0	2–1	2–2
2	Universidad de Chile	6	3	0	3	3	6	−3	6		1–0	—	1–0	1–0
3	(Chile) Everton	6	2	1	3	7	8	−1	5		1–3	2–0	—	1–0
4	(Paraguay) Olimpia	6	1	3	2	5	6	−1	5		0–0	1–0	2–2	—

=== Group 5 ===
Pos	Team	Pld	W	D	L	GF	GA	GD	Pts	Qualification	(Venezuela) POR	(Peru) HUA	(Venezuela) EST	(Peru) SBA
1	(Venezuela) Portuguesa	6	4	2	0	10	2	+8	10	Qualified to the Semi-finals	—	2–0	3–0	0–0
2	(Peru) Unión Huaral	6	2	2	2	5	6	−1	6		1–1	—	2–1	1–0
3	(Venezuela) Estudiantes de Mérida	6	3	0	3	6	8	−2	6		0–2	1–0	—	1–0
4	(Peru) Sport Boys	6	0	2	4	3	8	−5	2		1–2	1–1	1–3	—

== Semi-finals ==
The top finishers of each group in the first phase, plus the defending champions, are placed into two groups of three. The top finisher from each group play in the finals.

=== Group A ===
Pos	Team	Pld	W	D	L	GF	GA	GD	Pts	Qualification	(Argentina) BOC	(Colombia) CAL	(Paraguay) LIB
1	(Argentina) Boca Juniors	4	2	2	0	4	2	+2	6	Qualified to the final	—	1–1	1–0
2	(Colombia) Deportivo Cali	4	0	3	1	3	4	−1	3		1–1	—	0–0
3	(Paraguay) Libertad	4	1	1	2	2	3	−1	3		0–1	2–1	—

=== Group B ===
Pos	Team	Pld	W	D	L	GF	GA	GD	Pts	Qualification	(Brazil) CRU	(Brazil) INT	(Venezuela) POR
1	(Brazil) Cruzeiro	4	3	1	0	7	1	+6	7	Qualified to the final	—	0–0	2–1
2	(Brazil) Internacional	4	1	1	2	2	5	−3	3		0–1	—	2–1
3	(Venezuela) Portuguesa	4	1	0	3	5	8	−3	2		0–4	3–0	—

== Finals ==
The winner is determined by points (i.e., whoever wins the most of two games); goal difference or aggregate score is not used. If the points are tied after two games, a single-game playoff at a neutral sight will be played. If the game is tied after regulation, a penalty shootout will determine the winner.

September 6, 1977

Boca Juniors (Argentina)	1–0	(Brazil) Cruzeiro
Veglio 3'

Estadio Camilo Cichero
Buenos Aires, Argentina
Attendance: 60,000
Referee: Cerullo (Uruguay)

September 11, 1977

Cruzeiro (Brazil)	1–0	(Argentina) Boca Juniors
Nelinho 76'

Estádio Mineirão
Belo Horizonte, Brazil
Attendance: 80,000
Referee: Orozco (Peru)

September 14, 1977

Boca Juniors (Argentina)	0–0 (a.e.t.)	(Brazil) Cruzeiro
Penalties
Mouzo (penalty scored); Tesare (penalty scored); Zanabria (penalty scored); Pernía (penalty scored); Felman (penalty scored)	5–4	(penalty scored) Darcy Menezes; (penalty scored) Neca; (penalty scored) Morais; (penalty scored) Livio; (penalty missed) Vanderley

Estadio Centenario
Montevideo, Uruguay
Attendance: 60,000
Referee: Llobregat (Venezuela)

== Champions ==
1977 Copa Libertadores champions
(Argentina)
Boca Juniors
First title
