= Ernesto Mastrángelo =

Argentine footballer (1948–2023)

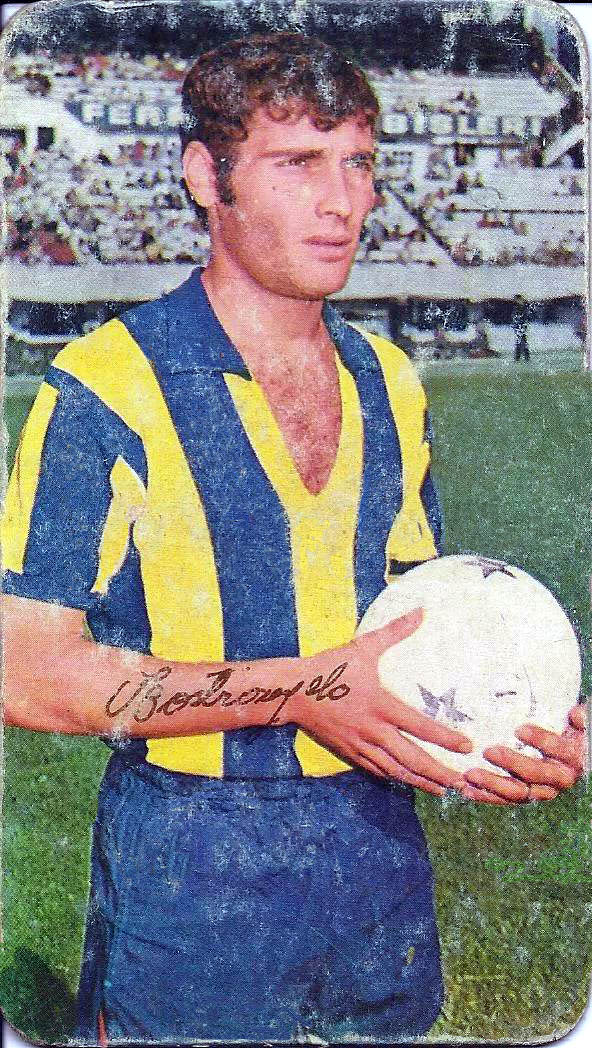
- Mastrángelo when playing for Atlanta, c. 1968

Personal information
- Full name: Ernesto Enrique Mastrángelo
- Date of birth: 5 July 1948
- Place of birth: Rufino, Argentina
- Date of death: 22 July 2023 (aged 75)
- Place of death: Buenos Aires, Argentina
- Position: Striker

Senior career*
Years	Team	Apps	(Gls)
1968–1971	Atlanta		
1972–1974	River Plate		
1975	Unión de Santa Fe		
1976–1981	Boca Juniors	103	(47)
1982	Defensor	10	(2)

International career
- Argentina
- * Club domestic league appearances and goals

Ernesto Enrique Mastrángelo (5 July 1948 – 22 July 2023) was an Argentine football striker who played for both River Plate and Boca Juniors in Argentina. He also played international football for the Argentina national team.

Mastrángelo (nicknamed Héber) started his career in 1968 with Atlanta. In 1972, he joined River Plate but he never won any titles during his time with the club. He joined Unión de Santa Fe in 1975, but in early 1976 he was signed by River Plate's eternal rivals Boca Juniors.

During his time with Boca, Mastrángelo scored 56 goals in 134 games in all competitions. He won a number of titles with the club including three league titles and two consecutive Copa Libertadores championships.

Mastrángelo was twice Boca's top scoring player, in 1977 and 1979, he retired in 1981 after the team won the Metropolitano championship.

Ernesto Mastrángelo died from idiopathic pulmonary fibrosis in Buenos Aires, on 22 July 2023, at the age of 75.

== Coaching career ==
After retiring as a player Mastrángelo has worked as a youth coach with clubs such as Boca Juniors and Chacarita Juniors and the Paraguay under-20 international team.

== Honours ==
=== Player ===
Boca Juniors

- Argentine Primera: Metropolitano 1976, Nacional 1976, Metropolitano 1981
- Copa Libertadores: 1977, 1978
- Copa Intercontinental: 1978
