= 1976 Argentine Primera División =

85th season of top-tier football league in Argentina

Primera División
- Season: 1976
- Champions: Boca Juniors (Metropolitano and Nacional)

The 1976 Primera División season was the 85th season of top-flight football in Argentina. Boca Juniors won both tournaments, Metropolitano and Nacional, totaling 20 league titles until then.

After three consecutive seasons with no relegations, San Telmo was relegated to Primera B after playing a small tournament with the worst placed teams in the general table.

== Metropolitano Championship ==
Metropolitano
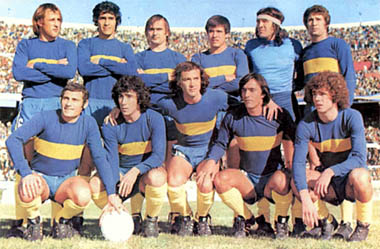
- Boca Juniors, Metropolitano champions
- Season: 1976
- Champions: Boca Juniors (19th title)
- Promoted: Quilmes; San Telmo
- Relegated: San Telmo
- 1977 Copa Libertadores: Boca Juniors
- Top goalscorer: (Argentina) Mario Kempes (21 goals)

=== Classification round ===
==== Group A ====
Pos	Team	Pld	W	D	L	GF	GA	GD	Pts
1	Huracán	22	15	7	0	47	20	+27	37
2	Estudiantes (LP)	22	10	9	3	33	22	+11	29
3	Independiente	22	9	10	3	37	24	+13	28
4	Boca Juniors	22	9	7	6	30	22	+8	25
5	Colón	22	9	4	9	35	35	0	22
6	Rosario Central	22	6	9	7	38	28	+10	21
7	Ferro Carril Oeste	22	6	8	8	28	36	−8	20
8	Banfield	22	4	10	8	29	40	−11	18
9	Atlanta	22	6	4	12	19	39	−20	16
10	San Telmo	22	4	7	11	27	37	−10	15
11	All Boys	22	2	8	12	15	38	−23	12

Source: Argentina 1976 - rsssf.com

==== Group B ====
Pos	Team	Pld	W	D	L	GF	GA	GD	Pts
1	River Plate	22	12	3	7	43	26	+17	27
2	Gimnasia y Esgrima (LP)	22	9	8	5	36	29	+7	26
2	Quilmes	22	10	6	6	36	36	0	26
4	San Lorenzo	22	10	5	7	31	29	+2	25
5	Unión	22	10	4	8	34	23	+11	24
5	Newell's Old Boys	22	8	8	6	32	28	+4	24
7	Vélez Sársfield	22	10	3	9	31	27	+4	23
8	Racing	22	8	5	9	36	37	−1	21
9	Chacarita Juniors	22	7	4	11	32	43	−11	18
10	Argentinos Juniors	22	5	4	13	27	43	−16	14
11	Temperley	22	3	7	12	21	35	−14	13

Source: Argentina 1976 on rsssf.org

=== Championship Group ===
Pos	Team	Pld	W	D	L	GF	GA	GD	Pts
1	Boca Juniors	11	8	3	0	18	8	+10	19
2	Huracán	11	7	2	2	20	12	+8	16
3	Estudiantes (LP)	11	5	4	2	16	13	+3	14
4	Unión	11	5	3	3	16	13	+3	13
4	River Plate	11	3	7	1	13	11	+2	13
6	Newell's Old Boys	11	4	4	3	11	12	−1	12
7	Quilmes	11	2	6	3	18	18	0	10
8	Rosario Central	11	2	5	4	14	16	−2	9
9	Colón	11	2	4	5	15	20	−5	8
10	Independiente	11	3	0	8	17	17	0	6
10	Gimnasia y Esgrima (LP)	11	1	4	6	13	21	−8	6
10	San Lorenzo	11	1	4	6	7	17	−10	6

Source: Argentina 1976 on rsssf.org

=== Relegation Group ===
Pos	Team	Pld	W	D	L	GF	GA	GD	Pts
1	Temperley	9	6	2	1	15	6	+9	14
2	Atlanta	9	3	5	1	14	13	+1	11
3	Ferro Carril Oeste	9	3	4	2	13	11	+2	10
4	Banfield	9	2	5	2	16	12	+4	9
4	Vélez Sársfield	9	2	5	2	11	10	+1	9
4	Chacarita Juniors	9	3	3	3	11	14	−3	9
7	Argentinos Juniors	9	0	8	1	11	15	−4	8
8	All Boys	9	2	3	4	12	14	−2	7
8	Racing	9	2	3	4	9	12	−3	7
10	San Telmo	9	2	2	5	12	17	−5	6

Source: Argentina 1976 on rsssf.org

== Nacional Championship ==
Nacional
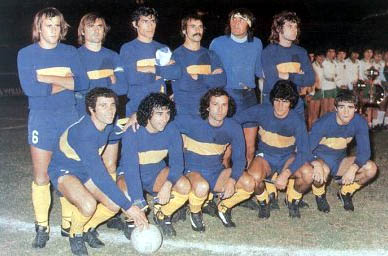
- Boca Juniors, Nacional champions
- Season: 1976
- Champions: Boca Juniors (20th title)
- Promoted: Platense
- 1977 Copa Libertadores: River Plate
- Top goalscorer: (Argentina) Norberto Eresuma (Argentina) Luis Ludueña (Argentina) Víctor Marchetti (12 goals each)

=== Group A ===
Pos	Team	Pld	W	D	L	GF	GA	GD	Pts
1	Boca Juniors	16	10	3	3	24	10	+14	23
1	Quilmes	16	9	5	2	21	12	+9	23
3	Independiente	16	8	5	3	24	17	+7	21
4	Atlético Tucumán	16	7	3	6	21	17	+4	17
5	Gimnasia y Esgrima (J)	16	5	5	6	17	19	−2	15
6	Gimnasia y Esgrima (LP)	16	5	4	7	14	20	−6	14
7	Chacarita Juniors	16	2	5	9	17	27	−10	9
7	Temperley	16	3	3	10	17	28	−11	9

Source: Argentina 1976 on rsssf.org

1st place Playoff

14 December 1976

- Boca Juniors 2-1 Quilmes

=== Group B ===
Pos	Team	Pld	W	D	L	GF	GA	GD	Pts
1	River Plate	16	10	4	2	31	14	+17	24
2	Banfield	16	9	4	3	33	18	+15	22
3	Estudiantes (LP)	16	8	5	3	23	14	+9	21
4	Racing	16	7	3	6	26	25	+1	17
5	Atlanta	16	5	5	6	23	23	0	15
5	Ledesma	16	6	3	7	17	18	−1	15
7	San Martín (T)	16	2	3	11	12	27	−15	7
8	San Telmo	16	1	2	13	15	46	−31	4

Source: Argentina 1976 on rsssf.org

=== Group C ===
Pos	Team	Pld	W	D	L	GF	GA	GD	Pts
1	Huracán	18	12	4	2	36	15	+21	28
2	Unión	18	10	5	3	32	15	+17	25
3	Rosario Central	18	7	8	3	24	19	+5	22
4	San Martín (M)	18	6	5	7	27	28	−1	17
5	Aldosivi	18	6	4	8	25	33	−8	16
6	Vélez Sársfield	18	4	7	7	21	24	−3	15
7	Platense	18	5	4	9	19	32	−13	14
8	Sportivo Patria	18	4	4	10	24	37	−13	12
8	All Boys	18	4	4	10	16	26	−10	12

Source: Argentina 1976 on rsssf.org

=== Group D ===
Pos	Team	Pld	W	D	L	GF	GA	GD	Pts
1	Talleres (C)	18	11	4	3	38	17	+21	26
1	Newell's Old Boys	18	11	4	3	38	19	+19	26
3	Ferro Carril Oeste	18	10	5	3	38	21	+17	25
4	Argentinos Juniors	18	7	3	8	26	27	−1	17
4	Huracán (CR)	18	7	3	8	20	24	−4	17
6	Central Norte	18	5	6	7	17	25	−8	16
7	Colón	18	4	7	7	13	20	−7	15
8	San Lorenzo	18	4	6	8	23	26	−3	14
9	San Lorenzo (MdP)	18	2	3	13	24	53	−29	7

Source: Argentina 1976 on rsssf.org

1st place Playoff

14 December 1976

- Talleres de Córdoba 3-1 Newell's Old Boys

=== Quarterfinals ===
16 December 1976

- Boca Juniors 2-1 Banfield
- River Plate 2-1 Quilmes
- Huracán 2-0 Newell's Old Boys
- Talleres de Córdoba 4-0 Unión de Santa Fe

=== Semifinals ===
19 December 1976

- Boca Juniors 1-0 Huracán
- River Plate 1-0 Talleres de Córdoba

=== Final ===
1976 Campeonato Nacional Final
22 December 1976

Boca Juniors	1–0	River Plate
Suñé 72'	Report

Racing Stadium, Avellaneda
Attendance: 69,090
Referee: Arturo Ithurralde
