= 1976 Copa Libertadores finals =

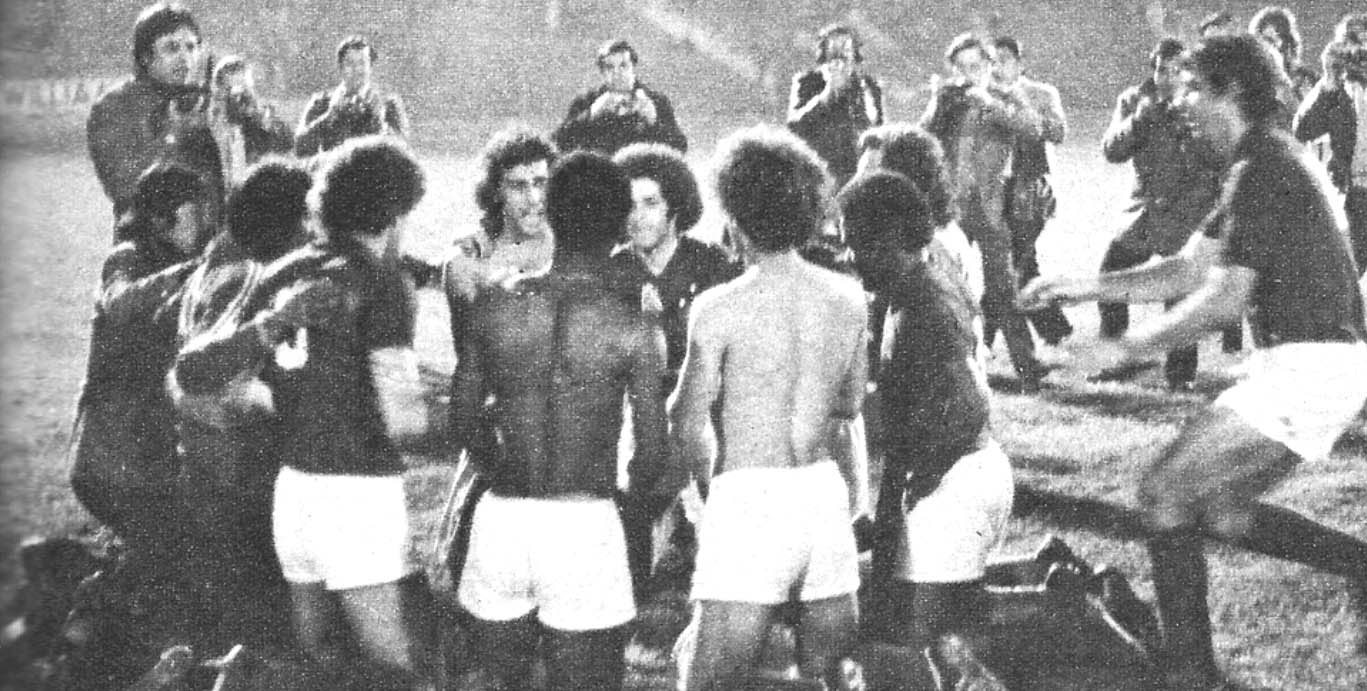
- Cruzeiro, champions
- Event: 1976 Copa Libertadores
Cruzeiro	River Plate
(Brazil)	(Argentina)
- 2–2 on points Cruzeiro won after a play-off

First leg
Cruzeiro	River Plate
4	1
- Date: 21 July 1976
- Venue: Mineirão, Belo Horizonte
- Referee: Vicente Llobregat (Venezuela)

Second leg
River Plate	Cruzeiro
2	1
- Date: 28 July 1976
- Venue: Estadio Monumental, Buenos Aires
- Referee: José Martínez Bazán (Uruguay)

Play-off
River Plate	Cruzeiro
2	3
- Date: 30 July 1976
- Venue: Estadio Nacional, Santiago
- Referee: Alberto Martínez (Chile)
- Attendance: 35,182

The 1976 Copa Libertadores finals was the final two-legged tie to determine the 1976 Copa Libertadores champion. It was contested by Argentine club River Plate and Brazilian club Cruzeiro Esporte Clube. The first leg of the tie was played on 21 July at Cruzeiro' home field, with the second leg played on 28 July at River'. Cruzeiro played in their 1st Copa Libertadores finals.

Cruzeiro won the series after winning a tie-breaking playoff 3–2 at Santiago's Estadio Nacional, with the winning goal by Joaozinho being scored by the end of the match.

== Qualified teams ==
Team	Previous finals app.
(Brazil) Cruzeiro	None
(Argentina) River Plate	1966

Notes

Bold indicates winners

== Stadiums ==
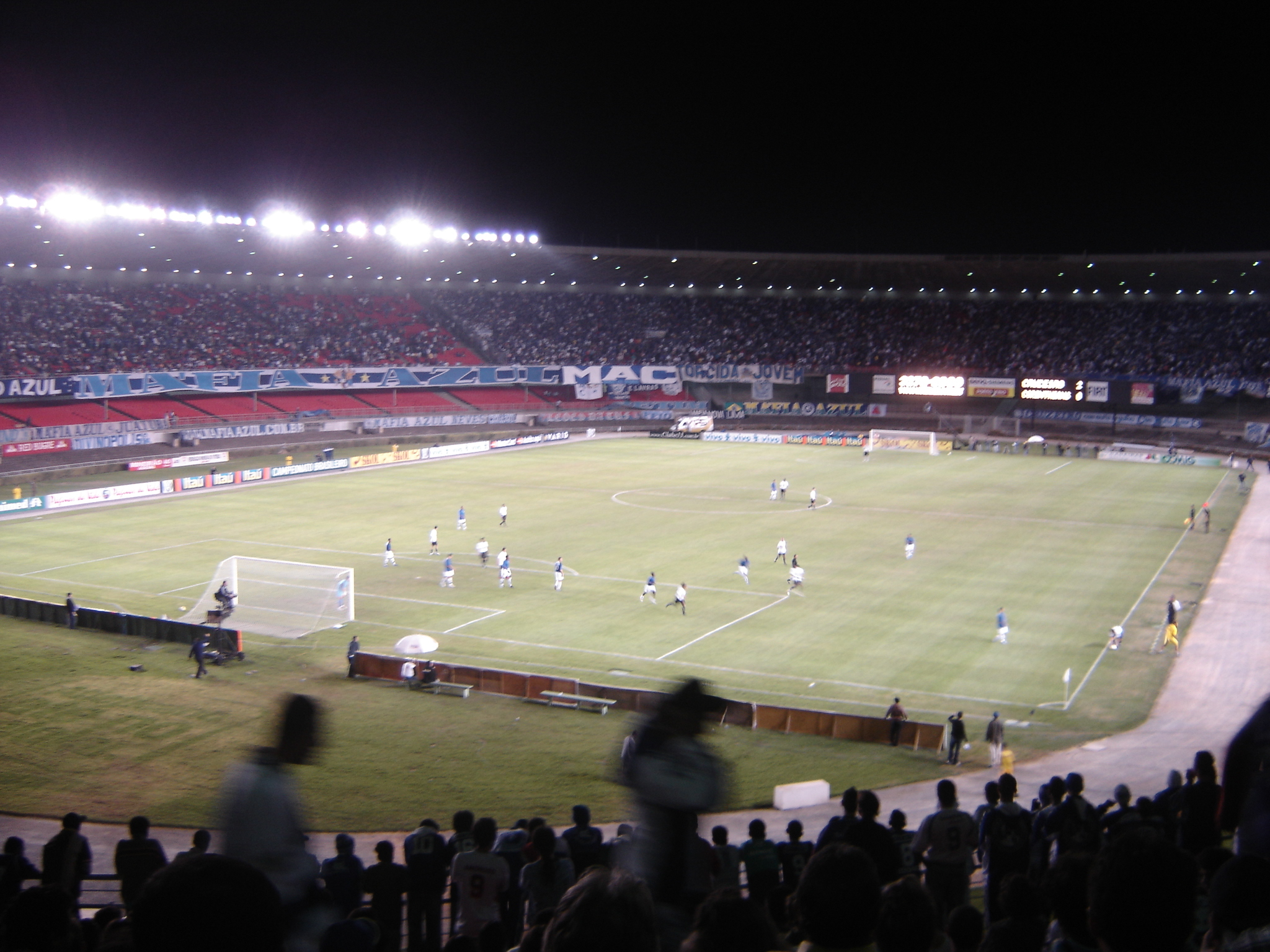
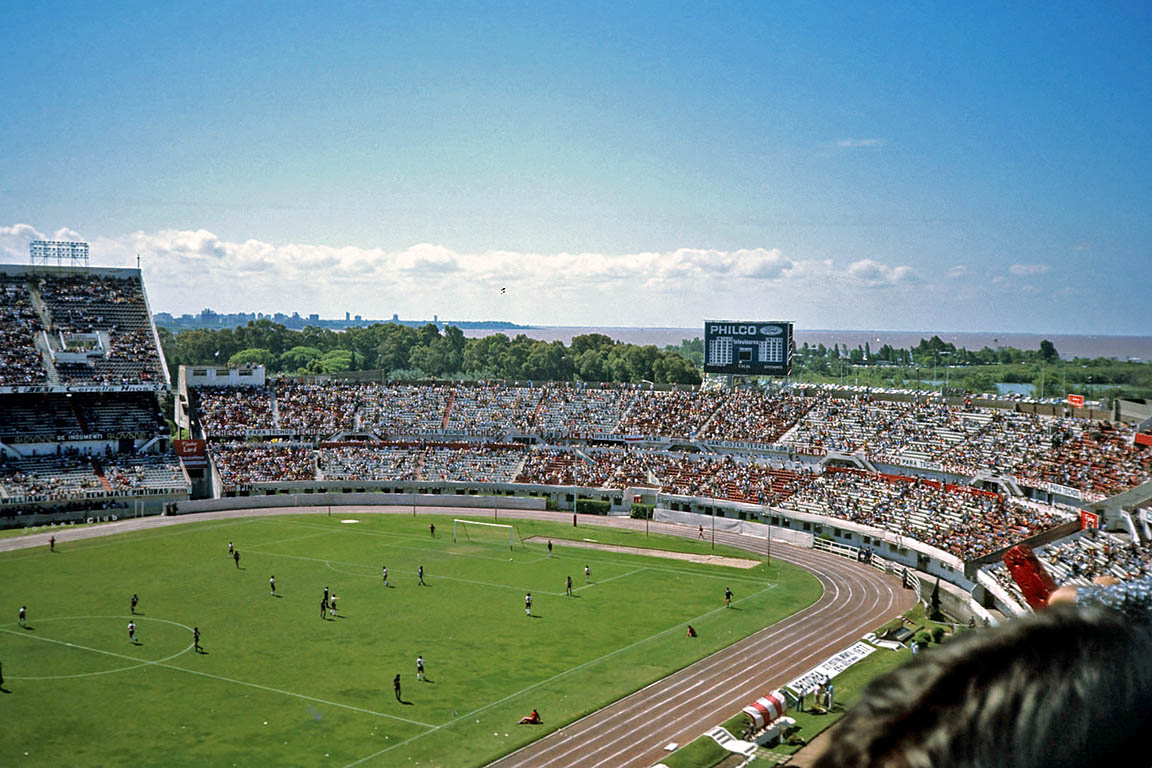
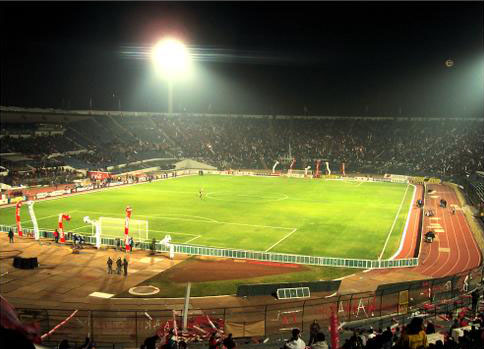
Mineirão, Monumental and Nacional de Santiago, venues of the final series

== Rules ==
The finals were played over two legs; home and away. The team that accumulated the most points —two for a win, one for a draw, zero for a loss— after the two legs would be crowned the champion. In case of two teams tied on points after the second leg a playoff at a neutral venue would be played to crown a champion, with goal difference used as a last resort.

== Route to the finals ==
Cruzeiro qualified to the 1976 Copa Libertadores as the 1975 Copa Brasil runners-up, defeated by Internacional 1-0 in the final match. River Plate qualified as champions of both 1975 Metropolitano and 1975 Nacional.

Cruzeiro
Round
River Plate
Main article: 1976 Copa Libertadores First round:
Group 3

Team	Pts	Pld	W	D	L	GF	GA	GD
(Brazil) **Cruzeiro**	**11**	6	5	1	0	20	9	+11
(Brazil) Internacional	**7**	6	3	1	2	10	8	+2
(Paraguay) Olimpia	**4**	6	1	2	3	7	11	-4
(Paraguay) Sportivo Luqueño	**2**	6	1	0	5	5	14	-9

Group stage
Main article: 1976 Copa Libertadores First round:
Group 1

Team	Pts	Pld	W	D	L	GF	GA	GD
(Argentina) **River Plate**	**10**	6	5	0	1	10	3	+7
(Argentina) Estudiantes	**9**	6	4	1	1	11	3	+8
(Venezuela) Portuguesa	**5**	6	2	1	3	8	11	-3
(Venezuela) Deportivo Galicia	**0**	6	0	0	6	3	15	-12

Main article: 1976 Copa Libertadores Semi-finals:
Group 1

Team	Pts	Pld	W	D	L	GF	GA	GD
(Brazil) **Cruzeiro**	**8**	4	4	0	0	18	3	15
(Ecuador) LDU Quito	**2**	4	1	0	3	4	10	-6
(Peru) Alianza Lima	**2**	4	1	0	3	4	13	-9

Semi-finals
Main article: 1976 Copa Libertadores Semi-finals:
Group 2

Team	Pts	Pld	W	D	L	GF	GA	GD
(Argentina) **River Plate**	**5**	4	2	1	1	4	1	+3
(Argentina) Independiente	**5**	4	2	1	3	2	1	+1
(Uruguay) Peñarol	**2**	4	1	0	3	1	5	-4

=== Group stage ===
River Plate was drawn into Group 1 alongside Estudiantes de La Plata, runners-up of the 1975 Metropolitano Championship, and Venezuelan sides Portuguesa and Deportivo Galicia. The millonarios cruised to the Semifinals after winning five of six matches, and losing just one. River won the three matches played at your home ground, scoring seven goals and suffering just two. River also won the two matches in Venezuela, against Portuguesa and Deportivo Galicia, by 2-0 and 1-0 respectively. The only defeat was against Estudiantes, in La Plata, by 0-1.

Cruzeiro was drawn into Group 3. They were joined by fellow Brazilian club Internacional and Paraguayan outfits Olimpia and Sportivo Luqueño. Like River Plate, Cruzeiro made a campaign with five wins in six matches, with the difference that the Brazilian club tied a game instead of losing. Cruzeiro won the three matches played at your home ground scoring thirteen goals and suffering six. Cruzeiro also won Internacional in Porto Alegre and Sportivo Luqueño in Luque, but tied 2-2 against Olimpia in Asunción.

=== Semi-finals ===
The Semifinals round was another group phase. Cruzeiro were drown in Group 1 alongside LDU Quito and Alianza Lima. This time, Cruzeiro won all their four matches including the historic 7-1 drubbing against Alianza Lima. It was the first game after the death of striker Roberto Batata, killed in an automobile accident. To honor his companion, players of Cruzeiro scored seven goals, which is the number of the shirt that was worn by Batata. Cruzeiro advanced to the finals with a 100% success.

In the Semifinals, River Plate played against defending champions Independiente and the Uruguayan club Peñarol. The two Argentine clubs finished tied on stage five points apiece, necessitating a playoff, where River Plate won Independiente by 1-0.

== Matches ==
=== First leg ===
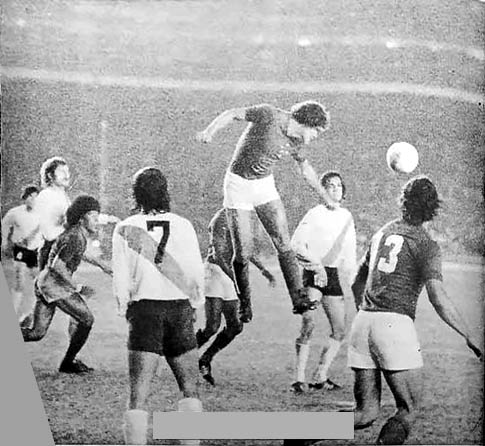
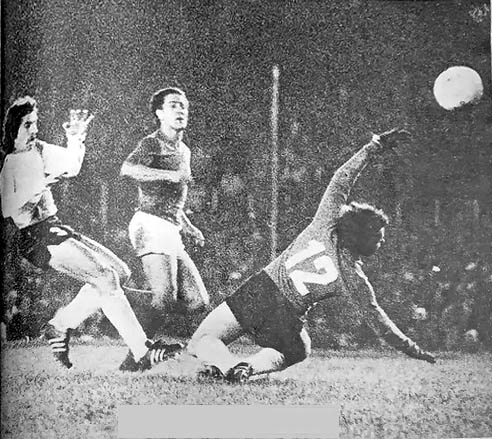
Two moments of the match in Belo Horizonte
1976 Copa Libertadores finals
21 July 1976
First leg

Cruzeiro (Brazil)	4–1	(Argentina) River Plate
Nelinho 22'; Palhinha 29', 40'; Valdo 80'		Más 63'

Mineirão, Belo Horizonte
Attendance: 58,720
Referee: Vicente Llobregat, Venezuela

**Cruzeiro**	**River Plate**

GK	1	(Brazil) Raul
DF	9	(Brazil) Nelinho
DF	3	(Brazil) Morais
DF	12	(Brazil) Darci
DF	6	(Brazil) Vanderlei
MF	13	(Brazil) Piazza (c)	(substituted off) 62'
MF	11	(Brazil) Eduardo	(substituted off) 68'
MF	8	(Brazil) Zé Carlos
FW	7	(Brazil) Jairzinho
FW	10	(Brazil) Joãozinho
FW	5	(Brazil) Palhinha
Substitutes:
MF	20	(Brazil) Valdo	(substituted on) 62'
MF	16	(Brazil) Ronaldo	(substituted on) 68'
Manager:
(Brazil) Zezé Moreira

GK	1	(Argentina) Ubaldo Fillol	(substituted off) 35'
DF	4	(Argentina) Pablo Comelles
DF	2	(Argentina) Roberto Perfumo (c)
DF	19	(Argentina) Daniel Lonardi
DF	3	(Argentina) Héctor López
MF	8	(Argentina) Juan José López
MF	5	(Argentina) Reinaldo Merlo
MF	16	(Argentina) Alejandro Sabella
FW	7	(Argentina) Pedro Alexis González
FW	9	(Argentina) Leopoldo Luque
FW	11	(Argentina) Oscar Más
Substitutes:
GK	12	(Argentina) Luís Landaburu	(substituted on) 35'
Manager:
(Argentina) Ángel Labruna

=== Second leg ===
28 July 1976
Second leg

River Plate (Argentina)	2–1	(Brazil) Cruzeiro
López 10'; González 76'		Palhinha 48'

Estadio Monumental, Buenos Aires
Attendance: 90,000
Referee: José Martínez Bazán (Paraguay)

**River Plate**	**Cruzeiro**

GK	12	(Argentina) Luís Landaburu
DF	4	(Argentina) Pablo Comelles
DF	2	(Argentina) Roberto Perfumo	(red card) 56'
DF	6	(Argentina) Daniel Passarella (c)
DF	3	(Argentina) Hector López		(substituted off) 16'
MF	8	(Argentina) Juan José López	(red card) 79'
MF	5	(Argentina) Reinaldo Merlo
MF	10	(Argentina) Norberto Alonso
FW	7	(Argentina) Pedro Alexis González
FW	9	(Argentina) Leopoldo Luque
FW	11	(Argentina) Oscar Más		(substituted off) 69'
Substitutes:
DF	19	(Argentina) Héctor Ártico		(substituted on) 16'
FW	16	(Argentina) Alejandro Sabella		(substituted on) 69'
Manager:
(Argentina) Ángel Labruna

GK	1	(Brazil) Raul
DF	9	(Brazil) Nelinho
DF	3	(Brazil) Morais
DF	12	(Brazil) Darci
DF	6	(Brazil) Vanderlei
MF	13	(Brazil) Piazza (c)
MF	11	(Brazil) Eduardo		(substituted off) 80'
MF	8	(Brazil) Zé Carlos
FW	7	(Brazil) Jairzinho	(red card) 56'
FW	10	(Brazil) Joãozinho
FW	5	(Brazil) Palhinha
Substitutes:
FW	16	(Brazil) Ronaldo		(substituted on) 80'
Manager:
(Brazil) Zezé Moreira

=== Playoff ===
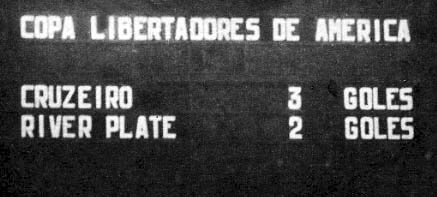
Scoreboard at the end of the playoff

30 July 1976
Playoff

Cruzeiro (Brazil)	3–2	(Argentina) River Plate
Nelinho 24'; Eduardo 55'; Joãozinho 88'		Más 59'; Urquiza 64'

Estadio Nacional, Santiago
Attendance: 35,182
Referee: Alberto Martínez (Chile)

**Cruzeiro**	**River Plate**

GK	1	(Brazil) Raul
DF	9	(Brazil) Nelinho
DF	3	(Brazil) Morais
DF	12	(Brazil) Darci
DF	6	(Brazil) Vanderlei
MF	13	(Brazil) Piazza (c)		(substituted off) 88'
MF	11	(Brazil) Eduardo
MF	8	(Brazil) Zé Carlos
FW	16	(Brazil) Ronaldo	(red card) 88'
FW	10	(Brazil) Joãozinho
FW	5	(Brazil) Palhinha
Substitutes:
DF	20	(Brazil) Valdo		(substituted on) 88'
Manager:
(Brazil) Zezé Moreira

GK	12	(Argentina) Luís Landaburu
DF	4	(Argentina) Pablo Comelles
DF	14	(Argentina) Héctor Artico
DF	19	(Argentina) Daniel Lonardi
DF	23	(Argentina) Alberto H. Urquiza
MF	16	(Argentina) Alejandro Sabella (c)
MF	5	(Argentina) Reinaldo Merlo
MF	10	(Argentina) Norberto Alonso	(red card) 89'
FW	7	(Argentina) Pedro Alexis González
FW	9	(Argentina) Leopoldo Luque
FW	11	(Argentina) Oscar Más		(substituted off) 59'
Substitutes:
FW	20	(Argentina) Daniel Crespo		(substituted on) 59'
Manager:
(Argentina) Ángel Labruna
