= 1976 Intercontinental Cup =

Bayern Munich	Cruzeiro
(West Germany)	(Brazil)
2	0
- on aggregate

First leg
Bayern Munich	Cruzeiro
2	0
- Date: 23 November 1976
- Venue: Olympiastadion, Munich
- Referee: Luis Pestarino (Argentina)
- Attendance: 22,000

Second leg
Cruzeiro	Bayern Munich
0	0
- Date: 21 December 1976
- Venue: Mineirão, Belo Horizonte
- Referee: Pat Partridge (England)
- Attendance: 123,715

The 1976 Intercontinental Cup was an association football tie held over two legs in November and December 1976 between Cruzeiro, winners of the 1976 Copa Libertadores, and the winners of the 1975–76 European Cup, Bayern Munich.

FC Bayern Munich didn't find a compatible schedule with South-American champions Club Atlético Independiente to play the 1975 Intercontinental Cup. The German club disputed the world title against the 1976 South-American champions, the Brazilian Cruzeiro Esporte Clube.

The team of Bavaria held the base of the German team who won the 1974 FIFA World Cup, with players like Sepp Maier, Franz Beckenbauer, Karl-Heinz Rummenigge and Gerd Müller. Cruzeiro was the first Brazilian club to become champion of the Copa Libertadores after Pelé's Santos FC. The team had the 1970 FIFA World Cup champions Wilson Piazza and Jairzinho, and other famous players like Nelinho, Raul Plassmann and Dirceu Lopes.

The first leg was held on 23 November 1976 at the Munich Olympic Stadium, home of Bayern. The match finished as a 2–0 victory for the home side, in a game with the pitch covered by snow. The goals were scored by Gerd Müller and Jupp Kapellmann.

Estádio Governador Magalhães Pinto, known as Mineirão, hosted the return leg on 21 December 1976. The match finished drawn by 0–0.

== Match summary ==
Bayern entertained their Brazilian visitors for the first leg of the Intercontinental Cup on 23 November 1976. Despite the arctic conditions, a 20,000 crowd made their way to the ground only to witness Cruzeiro Belo Horizonte turn in the livelier display. The home rearguard held firm before Gerd Müller claimed a typical poacher's goal to launch Bayern on the road to victory. The prolific goalscorer converted Uli Hoeness' lay-off for the opener ten minutes from time, before Jupp Kapellmann doubled the advantage two minutes later.

Munich travelled to Brazil for the return three days before Christmas. Jet-lagged and after only four hours in bed, the German team stepped out into the 117,000 crowd seeking to defend their aggregate lead. Keeper Sepp Maier and libero Franz Beckenbauer and the Bavarians came away with a trophy-winning goalless draw.

== Key player ==
To this day, fans in Munich admire Franz Beckenbauer and Gerd Müller, for strategy and scoring, respectively.

== Coach ==
The German footballing public knew Dettmar Cramer as "Napoleon". Franz Beckenbauer reverently addressed him as the "Professor", a mark of respect the Kaiser used for a long time . Cramer led Bayern to European Champions Cup success on two occasions before the victory over Cruzeiro Belo Horizonte. Cramer, who coached in 90 different countries before and after his time in Bavaria and held the German Federal Order of Merit and two honorary professorships, claimed to have learned one over-arching truth during a richly diverse career: "I've learnt no-one can tell whether somebody's a good or bad person just because he's black, white, yellow, red or green."

== First leg ==
=== Match details ===
23 November 1976

Bayern Munich (West Germany)	2–0	(Brazil) Cruzeiro
Müller 80'; Kappellmann 82'	Report

Olympiastadion, Munich
Attendance: 22,000
Referee: Luis Pestarino (Argentina)

Bayern Munich	Cruzeiro

GK	1	(West Germany) Sepp Maier
DF	2	(Sweden) Björn Andersson
DF	3	(West Germany) Udo Horsmann
DF	4	(West Germany) Hans-Georg Schwarzenbeck
DF	5	(West Germany) Franz Beckenbauer (c)
MF	6	(West Germany) Bernd Dürnberger
FW	7	(West Germany) Karl-Heinz Rummenigge
MF	8	(Sweden) Conny Torstensson
FW	9	(West Germany) Gerd Müller
FW	10	(West Germany) Uli Hoeneß
MF	11	(West Germany) Jupp Kapellmann
Manager:
(West Germany) Dettmar Cramer

GK	1	(Brazil) Raul Plassmann
DF	4	(Brazil) Nelinho
DF	3	(Brazil) Morais
DF	2	(Brazil) Ozires
DF	6	(Brazil) Vanderlei
MF	5	(Brazil) Wilson Piazza (c)
MF	8	(Brazil) Zé Carlos
MF	9	(Brazil) Palhinha
FW	10	(Brazil) Eduardo
FW	7	(Brazil) Jairzinho
FW	11	(Brazil) Joãozinho	(substituted off) 80'
Substitutes:
FW	16	(Brazil) Dirceu Lopes	(substituted on) 80'
Manager:
(Brazil) Zezé Moreira

== Second leg ==
=== Match details ===
21 December 1976

Cruzeiro (Brazil)	0–0	(West Germany) Bayern Munich
	Report

Mineirão, Belo Horizonte
Attendance: 123,715
Referee: Pat Partridge (England)

Cruzeiro	Bayern Munich

GK	1	(Brazil) Raul Plassmann
DF	4	(Brazil) Nelinho
DF	3	(Brazil) Morais
DF	2	(Brazil) Ozires
DF	6	(Brazil) Vanderlei
MF	5	(Brazil) Wilson Piazza (c)	(substituted off) 30'
MF	8	(Brazil) Zé Carlos
MF	9	(Brazil) Palhinha
FW	10	(Brazil) Dirceu Lopes	(substituted off) 46'
FW	7	(Brazil) Jairzinho
FW	11	(Brazil) Joãozinho
Substitutes:
DF	13	(Uruguay) Pablo Forlán	(substituted on) 46'
FW	14	(Brazil) Eduardo	(substituted on) 30'
Manager:
(Brazil) Zezé Moreira

GK	1	(West Germany) Sepp Maier
DF	2	(Sweden) Björn Andersson
DF	3	(West Germany) Udo Horsmann
DF	4	(West Germany) Hans-Georg Schwarzenbeck
DF	5	(West Germany) Franz Beckenbauer (c)
MF	6	(West Germany) Sepp Weiß
FW	7	(West Germany) Karl-Heinz Rummenigge	(substituted off) 85'
MF	8	(Sweden) Conny Torstensson
FW	9	(West Germany) Gerd Müller
FW	10	(West Germany) Uli Hoeneß
MF	11	(West Germany) Jupp Kapellmann
Substitutes:
MF	13	(West Germany) Fred Arbinger	(substituted on) 85'
Manager:
(West Germany) Dettmar Cramer

== See also ==
- FC Bayern Munich in international football competitions
