= List of Cruzeiro EC records and statistics =

Records of Brazilian football club Cruzeiro Esporte Clube.

== Records and statistics ==
=== Campeonato Brasileiro Série A record ===
- italic = ongoing

Year	Position	Year	Position	Year	Position	Year	Position	Year	Position	Year	Position
1971	8th	1981	19th	1991	16th	2001	21st	2011	16th	2021	–
1972	6th	1982	21st	1992	8th	2002	9th	2012	9th	2022	–
1973	3rd	1983	17th	1993	15th	2003	1st	2013	1st	2023	14th
1974	2nd	1984	33rd	1994	22nd	2004	13th	2014	1st	2024	
1975	2nd	1985	29th	1995	3rd	2005	8th	2015	8th		
1976	19th	1986	8th	1996	5th	2006	10th	2016	12th		
1977	16th	1987	6th	1997	20th	2007	5th	2017	5th		
1978	10th	1988	8th	1998	2nd	2008	3rd	2018	8th		
1979	6th	1989	3rd	1999	5th	2009	4th	2019	17th		
1980	10th	1990	10th	2000	3rd	2010	2nd	2020	–		

=== Campeonato Brasileiro Série B record ===
- italic = ongoing

Year	Position	Year	Position	Year	Position
2020	11th	2021	13th	2022	1st

=== Top appearances ===
#	Name	Career	Appearances
1	Fábio	2005–2021	976
2	Zé Carlos	1965–1977	633
3	Dirceu Lopes	1966–1977	601
4	Piazza	1964–1977	559
5	Raul Plassman	1966–1978	558
6	Joãozinho	1972–1986	482
7	Palhinha	1968–1977, 1983–1984	448
8	Ademir	1986–1991, 1993–1995	439
9	Ricardinho	1994–2002	415
10	Nelinho	1973–1982	410
11	Nonato	1990–1997	392
12	Tostão	1963–1972	378

- stats updated as of January 5, 2022
  - italic = active player

=== Top scorers ===
#	Name	Career	Goals
1	Tostão	1963–1972	248
2	Dirceu Lopes	1963–1977	224
3	Leonídio "Niginho" Fantoni	1926–1930, 1936–1937, 1939–1947	207
4	Bengala	1925–1939	166
5	Ninão	1923–1924, 1925–1930, 1936	163
6	Palhinha	1969–1977, 1982–1985	155
7	Alcides	1934–1946	152
8	Marcelo Ramos	1994–1996, 1998–2002	151
9	Roberto Batata	1969—1976	118
10	Joãozinho	1974–1981	116

== Notable season statistics ==
=== 2003 Serie A Title Campaign ===
In 2003 Cruzeiro won the National Triple Crown, winning national cup and both the state and national championships. The stats below regard the historical, record breaking Serie A title achieved that year, with 100 points and breaking the 100 goal mark. To this day, no team has won the title with a higher point percentage. That year, Cruzeiro also set a record for the most consecutive wins in the Campeonato Brasileiro Série A. On two occasions, the team won 8 games in a row, a record which is still unbeaten.

The team that year was led by coach Vanderlei Luxemburgo and captain/midfielder Alex, with many other notable players in the squad, such as 1994 FIFA World Cup winner Zinho, along with Colombia national football team legend Aristizábal, Brazil national football team regulars Gomes, Cris, Luisão, Maicon and Felipe Melo, as well as big name players such as Claudio Maldonado, Deivid de Souza, Maurinho and Edu Dracena.

Cruzeiro and defending champions Santos FC fought hard for the lead for most of the championship, until on round 29, Cruzeiro took the lead for good. The two teams were tied on points until round 31, when Cruzeiro, with a brace from Aristizábal, took a major 3–0 home win against second placed Santos, who boasted of national greats such as Robinho, Diego Ribas, Elano and Ricardo Oliveira. From then on, Cruzeiro only increased its lead until being confirmed champions with 2 rounds advance.

Having led the team to the domestic treble and scored 23 goals on the 2003 Campeonato Brasileiro Série A, Alex won the 2003 Bola de Ouro award and racked up all the years best player awards. Defender Maurinho and Chilean midfielder Claudio Maldonado also received individual awards.

Pos	Pts	Played	Wins	Draws	Loses	Goals scored	Goals against	Goals dif	Percentage
1	100	46	31	7	8	102	47	55	72.5%

=== 2013 Serie A Title Campaign ===
After losing the 2009 Copa Libertadores final, Cruzeiro struggled for a couple of seasons, undergoing major changes in its squad and director board and unable to play in its home, Mineirão, while the stadium was being prepared for the 2014 FIFA World Cup.

In 2013 Cruzeiro was back to its revamped home stadium and was finally able to direct higher investments to its football department. President Gilvan Tavares, along with director Alexandre Mattos signed coach Marcelo Oliveira and over 20 players during the 2012-2013 off-season.

The team quickly started showing what it was capable of, barely missing out on the regional championship title and starting the 2013 Campeonato Brasileiro Série A with a stunning 5–0 victory over Goiás. After alternating with Botafogo on 1st place for many rounds, the team reached a definitive lead on the 16th round, which was carried on until reaching the title, before even playing its own game on round 35. No one's ever been crowned national champions sooner.

Many Cruzeiro players were elected on the league's best 11, with Everton Ribeiro winning the 2013 Bola de Ouro and Brazilian Football Confederation Best Player awards. Goalkeeper Fábio, defenders Dedé and Mayke, midfielder Nilton and coach Marcelo Oliveira also received individual awards.

Pos	Pts	Played	Wins	Draws	Loses	Goals scored	Goals against	Goals dif	Percentage
1	76	38	23	7	8	77	37	40	66.7%

=== 2014 Serie A Title Campaign ===
With the amazing achievements of Marcelo Oliveira and his squad, led by goalkeeper/captain Fábio, along with Everton Ribeiro and Ricardo Goulart, Cruzeiro came to the 2014 season with the pressure to repeat its success.

With the goal of improving its record from the previous year, Cruzeiro started off by defeating rivals Atlético Mineiro to win the 2014 state championship. The team also reached the quarter-finals on the 2014 Copa Libertadores, going further on the continental cup than any other Brazilian team that year.

By the start of the 2014 Campeonato Brasileiro Série A, Cruzeiro showed its strength achieving good results with its reserve squad, used while the team's main players were being used in the Copa Libertadores games.

Cruzeiro started using its main squad on round 6 of the Serie A and reached 1st place right then, never to let it go again. It marked the start of a record shattering 32 round lead, capped with the title two rounds before the end of the league. The percentage of points achieved by the team that year was only rivaled by Cruzeiro's own 2003 season record. It was the team's 4th national title and 2nd consecutive league win. Cruzeiro came close to achieving its second ever Domestic Treble, or Triple Crown, reaching the 2014 Copa do Brasil final.

As in 2013, several Cruzeiro players were featured among the league's best 11, with Ricardo Goulart winning the 2014 Bola de Ouro award and Everton Ribeiro taking his second consecutive Brazilian Football Confederation Best Player award. Defenders Dedé and Egídio, midfielder Lucas Silva and coach Marcelo Oliveira also received notable individual awards.

Pos	Pts	Played	Wins	Draws	Loses	Goals scored	Goals against	Goals dif	Percentage
1	80	38	24	6	8	67	38	29	70.2%

== World Cup winners ==
The following players won the FIFA World Cup while playing for Cruzeiro:

- (Brazil) Tostão (Mexico 1970)
- (Brazil) Fontana (Mexico 1970)
- (Brazil) Piazza (Mexico 1970)
- (Brazil) Ronaldo (United States 1994)
- (Brazil) Edílson (South Korea/Japan 2002)
