= Norberto Alonso =

Argentine former footballer (born 1953)

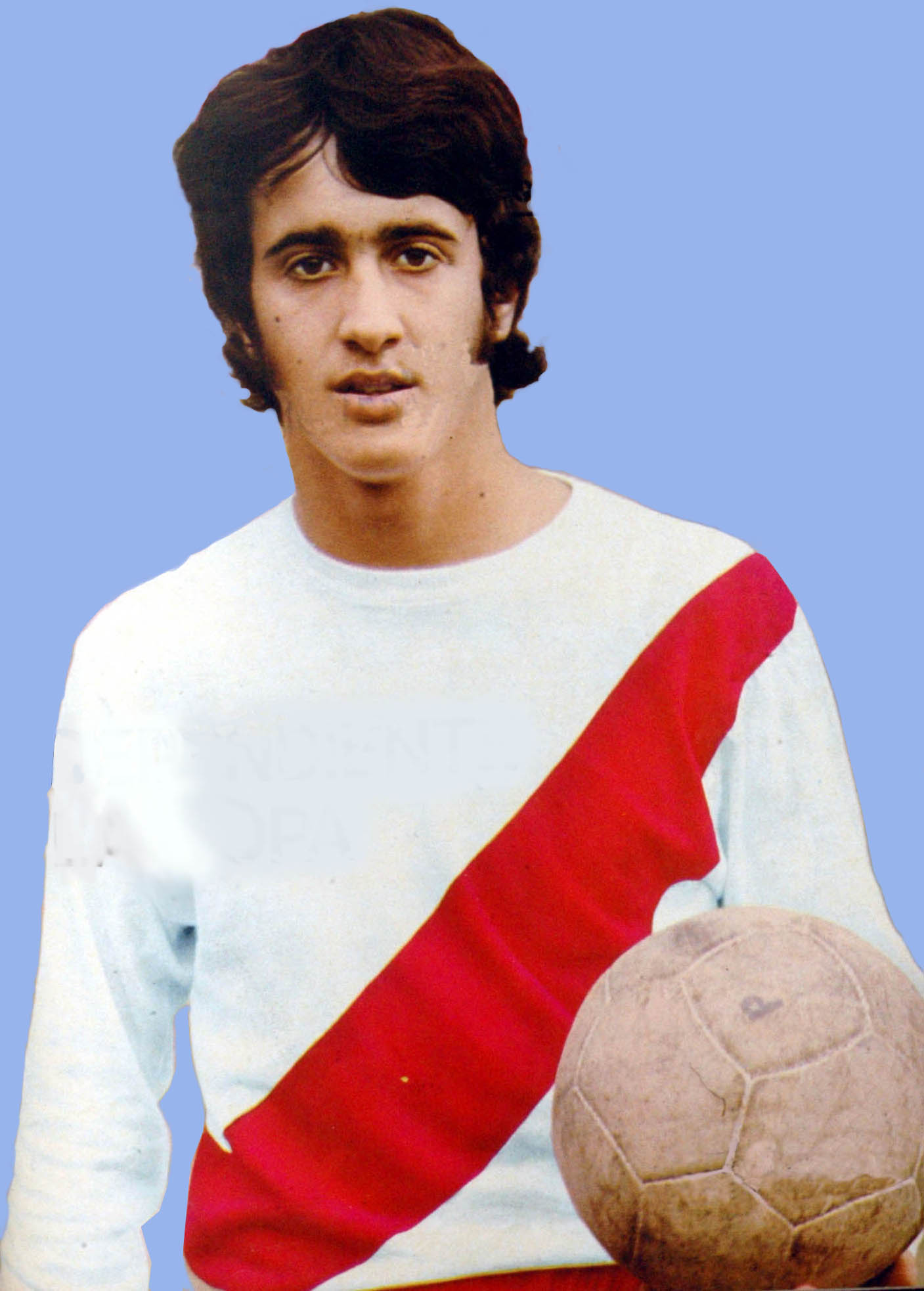
- Alonso in 1972

Personal information
- Full name: Norberto Osvaldo Alonso
- Date of birth: 4 January 1953 (age 73)
- Place of birth: Vicente López, Buenos Aires, Argentina
- Height: 1.76 m (5 ft 9 1/2 in)
- Position: Attacking midfielder

Youth career
- River Plate

Senior career*
Years	Team	Apps	(Gls)
1970–1976	River Plate	168	(68)
1976	Olympique Marseille	17	(6)
1977–1981	River Plate	142	(63)
1981–1983	Vélez Sársfield	73	(14)
1983–1987	River Plate	64	(18)
Total		464	(169)

International career
1978–1983	Argentina	15	(4)
Medal record
Representing Argentina
FIFA World Cup
Winner	1978 Argentina	Team
- * Club domestic league appearances and goals as of May 2007

Norberto Osvaldo Alonso (born 4 January 1953), better known as Beto Alonso is an Argentine former footballer who played as midfielder and spent most of his career at River Plate, where he won 9 titles. He remains one of their most notable players. Alonso was regularly regarded as one of the best South American players in the world during the 1970s.

He stands in fifth place in River Plate's all time goalscoring records with 149 goals and 7th place in their all time appearances record with 374 matches played. A former Copa Libertadores, Intercontinental Cup and FIFA World Cup champion.

== Club career ==
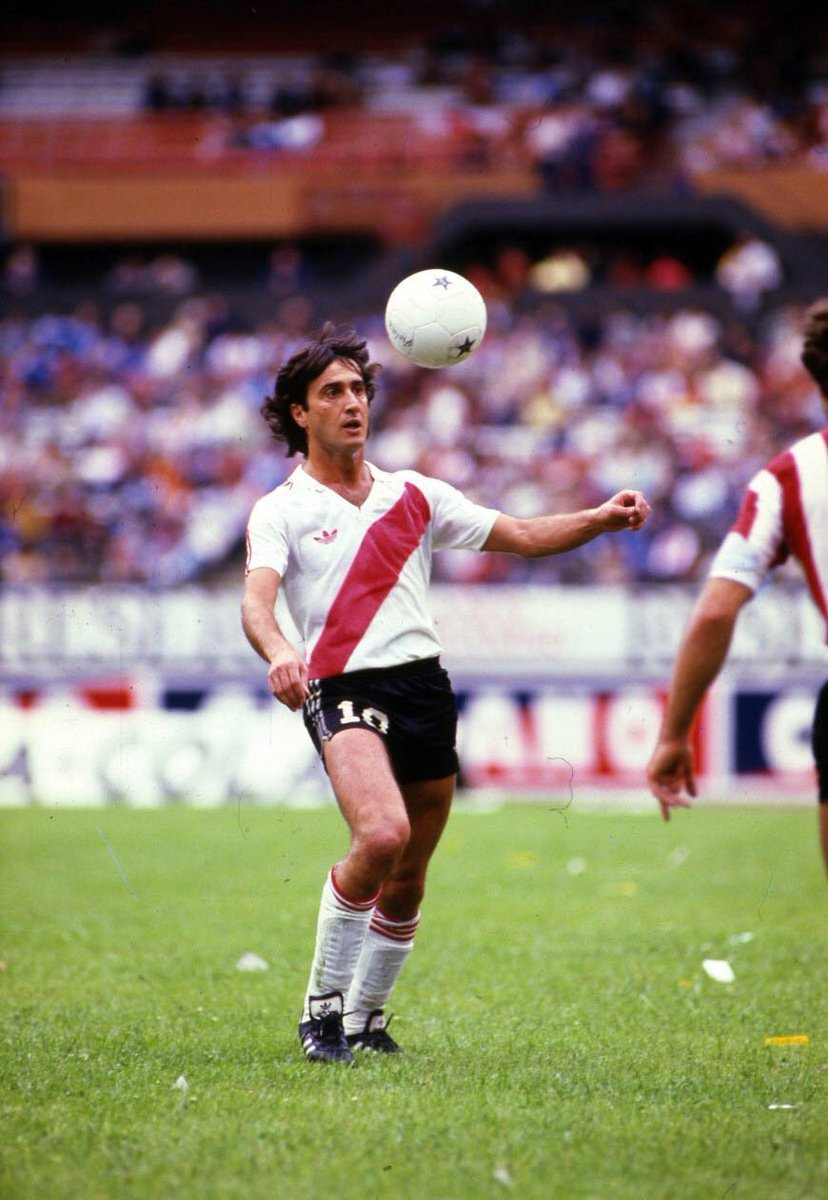
Alonso with River Plate in 1984

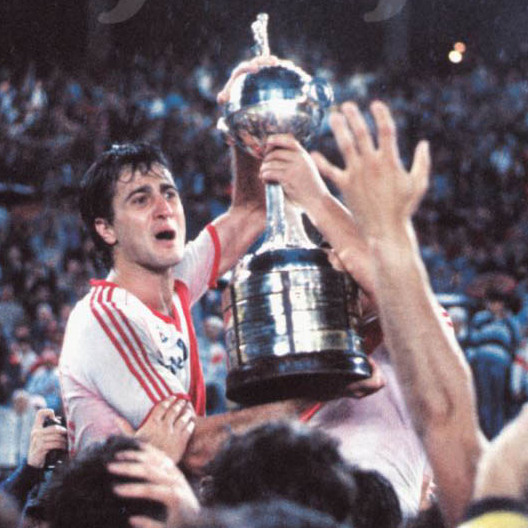
Alonso holding the 1986 Copa Libertadores

Alonso was born in Vicente López, Buenos Aires province, but grew up in the poor suburb of Los Polvorines. An attacking midfielder, he rose through the ranks of River's youth divisions as the team was undergoing its infamous dry spell (18 years, 1957 to 1975, without a championship title). When Angel Labruna took the reins in 1975, Alonso was the team's anchor and holder of the No. 10 jersey.

With reinforcements Roberto Perfumo and Ubaldo Fillol, and the maturing of players like Daniel Passarella, Carlos Morete, J. J. López and Reinaldo Merlo, Alonso led the squad that won both the Metropolitano and the Nacional tournaments of 1975, ushering in a series of seven local titles in the period 1975–1981.

In 1976, Alonso was transferred to Olympique Marseille, but he was unsuccessful. River Plate arranged for his return in 1977.

Between the years 1979–1981, River won four local titles, and became one of the most expensive teams in the world, with a first team (Alonso-Luque) playing in league games and an equally prestigious second team (Carrasco-Ramón Díaz) used mostly in Copa Libertadores matches.

During the 1981 "Nacional" tournament (which River would eventually win), Alonso often clashed with then coach Alfredo Di Stéfano (who seldom selected him for the first team and instead put younger players such as Carlos Daniel Tapia and José María Vieta in his position). After the Nacional, Alonso was put on the transfer list and was sold to Vélez Sársfield on 1982. After playing alongside veteran Carlos Bianchi, he returned to River Plate once again for the 1984 season.

Many talented midfielders emerged from River Plate's youth system during Alonso's reign, including Alejandro Sabella, Néstor Gorosito and Pedro Troglio.

Alonso was a key player of the successful team of 1985–86 that won River Plate's first Copa Libertadores and Intercontinental Cup. In 1985, his main partner was Enzo Francescoli. By the time he retired, he had scored 166 goals in 464 matches.

== National team ==
Although he was included in the Argentine squad, Alonso was not in the plans of coach César Luis Menotti for the 1978 FIFA World Cup. Menotti gave Alonso only a few minutes of play during the tournament, as Argentina went on to win the competition on home soil.

For the 1978 World Cup, Argentina numbered players alphabetically, and as a result Alonso (a midfielder) wore the number 1 jersey (usually reserved for goalkeepers).

In 1983, national coach Carlos Bilardo gave Alonso some playing time, but eventually used younger players Diego Maradona, Jorge Burruchaga, and Carlos Tapia in his position.

== Post-retirement ==
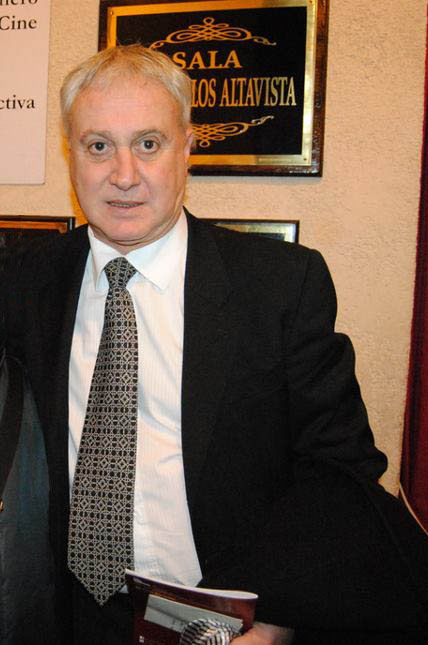
Alonso in 2012

Norberto Alonso played his last official match on December 4th, 1986, in the 1986 Intercontinental Cup final vs. Steaua Bucureșt, held in Tokyo. He played a pivotal role by taking a quick free kick that led to the only goal of the match, scored by Antonio Alzamendi. River Plate won 1–0, clinching the Intercontinental Cup for the first time in history.

In July 1987, River Plate held a testimonial match at the Monumental honoring Alonso, attended by approximately 80,000 spectators.

After retiring from the pitch, Alonso opened an insurance agency. He was also a partner in several commercial ventures, even though he was not an advertising figurehead: his appeal for non-River fans was limited, and Maradona was Argentina's poster boy after his exploits in the 1986 World Cup.

Together with Merlo, Alonso coached River Plate in 1989, but the duo was dismissed mid-season when new club president Alfredo Davicce made good on an election promise to bring in Daniel Passarella as coach. River eventually went on to win the championship.

== Career statistics ==
=== Club ===
Individual statistics of Norberto Alonso in championship
Club	season	Metropolitano		Nacional		Total	
Club	season	matches	goals	matches	goals	matches	goals
River Plate; Argentina	1971	10	1	13	2	23	3
River Plate; Argentina	1972	26	12	15	9	41	21
River Plate; Argentina	1973	16	3	10	6	26	9
River Plate; Argentina	1974	10	1	14	6	24	7
River Plate; Argentina	1975	28	20	12	7	40	27
River Plate; Argentina	1976	14	1	0	0	14	1
River Plate; Argentina	Total	104	38	64	30	168	68
Olympique de Marseille; France	1976–1977	17	3	–	–	17	3
Olympique de Marseille; France	Total	17	3	–	–	17	3
River Plate; Argentina	1977	0	0	14	6	14	6
River Plate; Argentina	1978	14	15	17	8	31	23
River Plate; Argentina	1979	13	8	13	5	26	13
River Plate; Argentina	1980	24	7	16	8	40	15
River Plate; Argentina	1981	20	6	11	0	31	6
River Plate; Argentina	Total	71	36	71	27	142	63
Vélez Sarsfield; Argentina	1982	24	2	13	2	37	4
Vélez Sarsfield; Argentina	1983	24	4	12	6	36	10
Vélez Sarsfield; Argentina	Total	48	6	25	8	73	14
River Plate; Argentina	1984	27	7	9	3	36	10
River Plate; Argentina	1985	–	–	9	3	9	3
River Plate; Argentina	1985–1986	15	5	–	–	15	5
River Plate; Argentina	1986–1987	4	0	–	–	4	0
River Plate; Argentina	Total	46	12	18	6	64	18
Total						464	166

== Honours ==
River Plate

- Primera División: 1975 Nacional, 1975 Metropolitano, 1979 Nacional, 1979 Metropolitano, 1980 Metropolitano, 1981 Nacional, 1985–86
- Copa Libertadores: 1986; runner-up: 1976
- Intercontinental Cup: 1986

Argentina

- FIFA World Cup: 1978

=== Individuals ===
- El Gráfico awards:

Argentine Primera División Best Player: 1972 National, 1975 Metropolitan, 1981 Metropolitan

Argentine Primera División Best 11: 1972, 1975, 1981

- El Mundo (Venezuela) awards:

South American Footballer of the Year second place 1975, seventh place 1972 and 1976.

- Konex Award One of the Best Argentinian Players of Decade: 1990
- Clarín Awards Included in the greatest "numbers 10" of Argentina: 2010
- Copa Libertadores All Times Dream team By Bolavip
- River Plate All Times Dream Team by Marca: 2020
- IFFHS Argentina All Times Dream Team (Team C): 2021
