= Pedro Alexis González =

Argentinian footballer (born 1950)

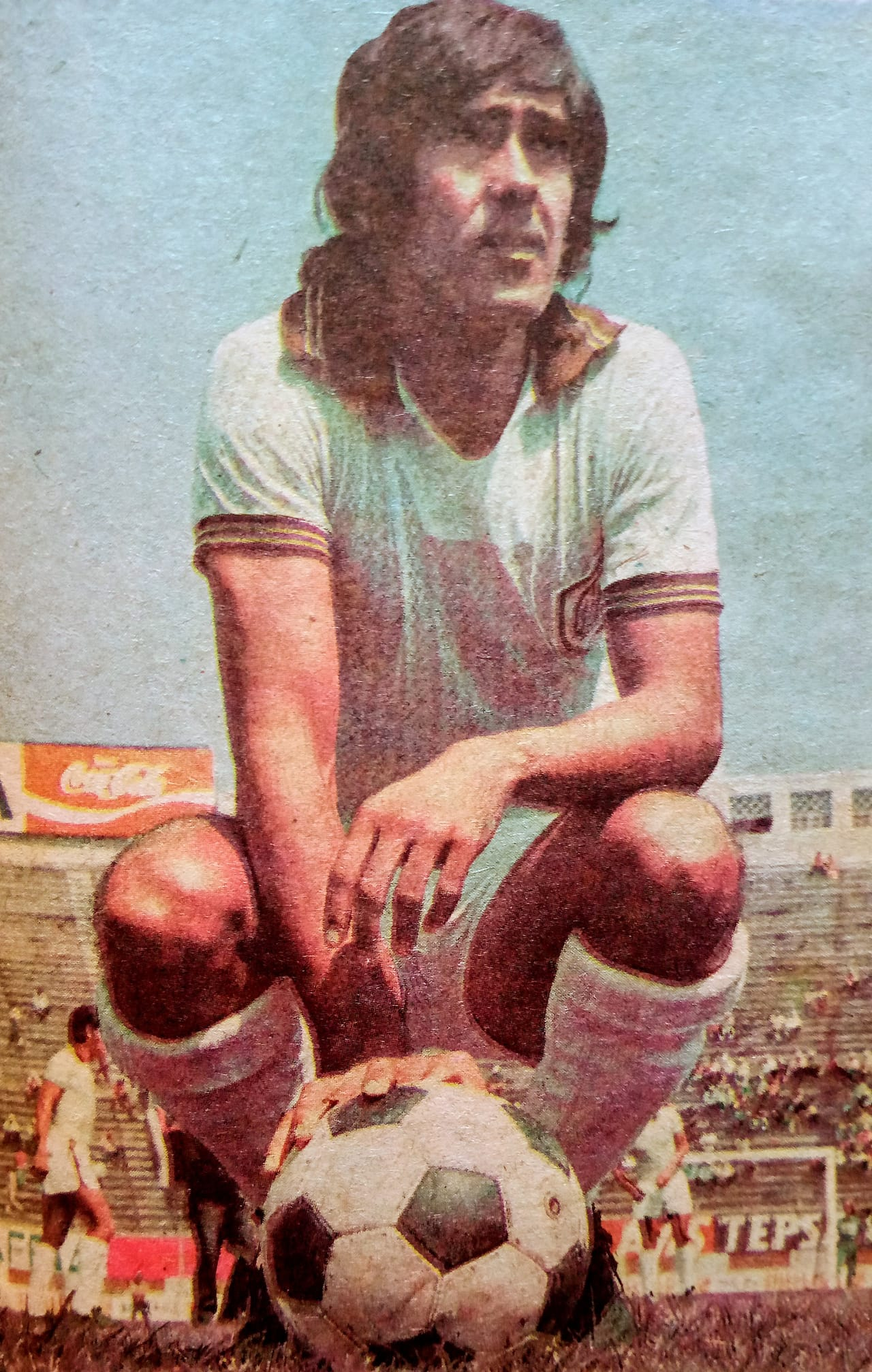
- González in 1972

Personal information
- Full name: Pedro Alexis González
- Date of birth: 10 March 1946 (age 80)
- Place of birth: Bella Vista, Corrientes. Argentina
- Position: Outside forward

Youth career
- ???–1965: Lipton

Senior career*
Years	Team	Apps	(Gls)
1966–1971	San Lorenzo	135	(38)
1971–1974	Defensor Lima		
1975–1981	River Plate	267	(44)
1982	Talleres	46	(7)
1983	Renato Cesarini	1	(0)
1984	All Boys	7	(0)

International career
1969–1977	Argentina	7	(2)

Managerial career
- 1989–1990: Laferrere
- 1989–1990 1991–1992: Laferrere
- 1992–1993: Chaco For Ever
- 1993–1994: Mandiyú
- 1999–2000: Godoy Cruz
- * Club domestic league appearances and goals

Pedro Alexis González (born 10 March 1946) is a retired Argentine football player and manager. Nicknamed "Bordolino", he played for various clubs throughout the 1970s and the early 1980s as an outside forward, mostly associated with his tenure with Defensor Lima as a part of its golden generation by winning the 1973 Torneo Descentralizado. He also represented Argentina from 1969 to 1977 on seven occasions.

== Club career ==
=== San Lorenzo (1966–71) ===
González began his career with Lipton in his native province. In 1966, he began his professional career with San Lorenzo in a 1–1 draw against Lanús. During his tenure with the Ciclón, he won the 1968 Campeonato Metropolitano under Brazilian manager Tim, being a part of the team that was given the nickname of "Los Matadores". He played alongside other players such as Rafael Albretch, Alberto Rendo, Roberto Telch, Héctor Veira and Rodolfo Fischer. The forward would remain with San Lorenzo until 1971 as during the height of his football career and the middle of the 1971 season, would be called up to play for Defensor Lima from club owner Luis Banchero Rossi as one of his last decisions as owner before his murder in 1972.

=== Defensor Lima (1971–74) ===
González would arrive to Breña shortly after under Uruguayan manager Roque Gastón Máspoli who led Peñarol to win the Copa Libertadores and the Copa Intercontinental after succeeding Argentine manager Manuel Giúdice as a part of an ambitious plan to win the Torneo Descentralizado. In his debut match against Alianza Lima, he scored the two goals that led to the 2–1 against the Blanquiazules. The 1971 Torneo Descentralizado would conclude with the club reaching third place, shy of a single point from runners-up Alianza Lima as well as tournament champions Universitario de Deportes.

Following moderate results at the 1972 Torneo Descentralizado, the following 1973 Torneo Descentralizado would see González contribute to the club becoming champions of Peruvian football and qualified for the 1974 Copa Libertadores where the club would lead the group stage consisting of Peruvian and Ecuadorian clubs. The forward scored his only goal in the match against Sporting Cristal as the club would end up being eliminated from the tournament during the semi-finals following poor results against São Paulo and Millonarios. The 1974 Torneo Descentralizado would be the final season in where González played for the club as they would go on the reach third place once more with 11 behind season champions Universitario de Deportes.

=== Return to Argentina (1975–84) ===
He then returned to Argentina to play for River Plate. Club manager Ángel Labruna had desired to revitalize the club's prestige after a lack of titles since 1957. After a solid performance in the first round, the club stagnated by the second half but would able to triumph over San Lorenzo and achieve the title of both the Campeonato Metropolitano and the Campeonato Nacional within the 1975 Argentine Primera División with a team consisting mostly of younger players. Over the course of his career with River Plate, he won five titles with the Núñez-based club including his overall contribution to the 1976 Copa Libertadores as he scored several goals including the finals where he scored a goal in the second leg. He remained with the club until the 1981 season with 267 appearances and 44 goals.

For the 1982 season, he played for Talleres once again under Labruna and played alongside other players such as Héctor Ártico, Pedro Coudannes, Juan José López and Carlos Morete. The following 1983 season saw him play for Club Renato Cesarini in Rosario, playing in just one game in the 1983 Campeonato Nacional. He would finish his career with All Boys in 1984, playing in seven games.

== International career ==
González represented Argentina internationally on at least seven occasions from 1969 to 1977 along with scoring two goals. These appearances consisted of friendlies and his participation in the 1970 FIFA World Cup qualifiers where Argentina would fail to qualify.

== Managerial career ==
He briefly served as a manager throughout the 1990s as he would oversee the operations of Deportivo Mandiyú, Deportivo Laferrere, Chaco For Ever and Godoy Cruz.
