= Reinaldo Merlo =

Argentine footballer (born 1950)

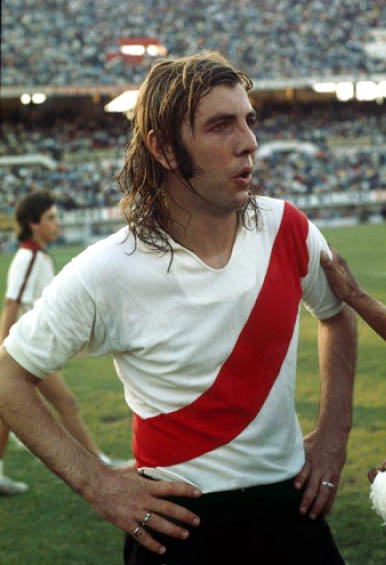
- Merlo playing for River Plate c. 1979

Personal information
- Full name: Reinaldo Carlos Merlo
- Date of birth: 20 May 1950 (age 76)
- Place of birth: Buenos Aires, Argentina
- Position: Defensive midfielder

Senior career*
Years	Team	Apps	(Gls)
1969–1984	River Plate	526	(11)

Managerial career
- 1986–1987: Los Andes
- 1989–1990: River Plate
- 1991: Argentina U20
- 1993: Argentina U17
- 1995: Bolívar
- 1998: Deportes Temuco
- 1998–1999: Chacarita Juniors
- 1999: Atlético Nacional
- 2000: Belgrano
- 2001–2002: Racing Club
- 2004–2005: Estudiantes
- 2005–2006: River Plate
- 2006–2007: Racing Club
- 2008: Barcelona SC
- 2009: Rosario Central
- 2013: Douglas Haig
- 2013–2014: Racing Club
- 2014–2015: Colón
- 2017: Fuerza Amarilla
- 2018–2019: Racing de Córdoba
- 2021–2022: Defensores Unidos
- * Club domestic league appearances and goals

Reinaldo Carlos Merlo (born 20 May 1950), better known as Mostaza Merlo, is an Argentine former football coach and former player, who played as a midfielder for Club Atlético River Plate throughout his entire career, while he is also idol as a coach for Racing Club. Merlo is also the player with the most appearances for River Plate, with a total of 563 matches.

== Playing career ==
People think he was called "Mostaza" (lit. 'Mustard') because of his hair colour, which he dyed several times with some of the best hair dyes of the time. The truth is, he himself took it upon himself to deny this: "As a kid, they called me Mostaza because I went everywhere with my dad, and they called him Pancho (lit. 'Hot Dog')." Anyway Merlo played his entire career for River Plate as a defensive midfielder. He was part of the midfield that conquered a string of championships under coach Ángel Labruna between 1975 and 1981, the others being Juan José López and Norberto Alonso.

Merlo was, together with goalkeeper Ubaldo Fillol and defender Daniel Passarella, the backbone of that team. River, nonetheless, purchased several players to fill in Merlo's position, because he was considered a great defender, but a liability once the team got the ball. Among them were Ramiro Pérez, Chamaco Rodríguez, Della Savia, Cierra, Carranza, Pitarch, de los Santos, and Américo Gallego, who ultimately earned Merlo's position. Before retirement, Merlo mentored an up-and-coming midfielder: Néstor Gorosito. Both Gallego and Gorosito have since met Merlo as rival coaches.

Merlo made over 500 appearances for River. He won seven titles during his time at the club and made 42 appearances in the Superclasico, more than any other player in history.

== Managerial career ==
After the end of his playing career, Merlo studied for an official coaching matriculation, and proceeded to train several smaller teams until offered the position of coach at River Plate in 1989, together with Alonso. Merlo and Alonso were dismissed in mid-season after new club president Davicce made good on an election promise to bring Passarella as coach; the team won the championship title, and fans gave Merlo credit for a big part of that success.

In 1999, Merlo commanded Atlético Nacional of Colombia during the first half of the season; albeit successful, his managerial choices proved unpopular, and he resigned from his position. He was subsequently replaced by Luis Fernando Suarez, who would eventually win the tournament. Fans later gave credit to Merlo for his part on the title.

In 2001, Merlo did the almost-impossible and coached the team that ended a 35-year drought for Racing Club. His serenity and his insistence on taking things one match at a time earned him his nickname "paso a paso" (step by step), after the sentence he often told anxious fans and reporters.

When Carlos Bilardo left Estudiantes in 2004, Merlo was offered the post of coach; the team advanced from relegation danger to the top positions, being a contender both in the 2004 Apertura and the 2005 Clausura. Merlo recalls fondly that both his debut (in 1969) and his first goal were both against Estudiantes Futbolistas: Reinaldo Carlos Merlo.

In August 2005, Merlo resigned from his post at Estudiantes. A few weeks later, Leonardo Astrada resigned as River Plate coach, and Merlo was brought in his place.

On 9 January 2006, following a dismal campaign in which River failed to contend for the 2005 Apertura, Merlo resigned as River Plate coach, and Passarella was called to fill in. There is controversy about the way he left River Plate during that pre-season of 2006. It is said that Marcelo Gallardo told him that neither he nor his teammates agreed with "his project", and that led to many discussions that made Merlo quit the team, and Gallardo is still blamed for Mostaza's sudden departure.

Merlo went on to unsuccessful spells as manager at Racing Club and Barcelona SC of Ecuador.

In 2009, he became the manager of Rosario Central but left the club on 15 April 2009 after only five games in charge (won three, tied one and lost one) because of personal problems with the player Ezequiel González.

Merlo returned to managerial functions in February 2013, hired by Club Douglas Haig, playing in Primera B Nacional.

== Honours ==
=== Player ===
River Plate

- Argentine Primera División (7): Metropolitano 1975, Nacional 1975, Metropolitano 1977, Metropolitano 1979, Nacional 1979, Metropolitano 1980, Nacional 1981
- Copa Libertadores runner-up: 1976

=== Manager ===
Racing Club

- Argentine Primera División: Apertura 2001

== See also ==
- One club man
