= Ozires de Paiva =

Brazilian footballer

Ozires
Personal information
- Full name: Ozires de Paiva
- Date of birth: 29 January 1952 (age 74)
- Place of birth: Rio de Janeiro, Brazil
- Position: Defender

Youth career
- Botafogo

Senior career*
| Years | Team | Apps | (Gls) |
| 1970–1973 | Botafogo | | |
| 1971 | → Fortaleza (loan) | | |
| 1972 | → Ponta Grossa (loan) | | |
| 1973 | → Ríver | | |
| 1973–1975 | Fortaleza | | |
| 1975–1979 | Cruzeiro | 140 | (2) |
| 1978 | → São Cristóvão (loan) | | |
| 1980 | Bahia | | |
| 1981–1982 | Grêmio Maringá | | |
| 1982–1983 | Cruzeiro | 64 | (1) |
| 1983–1984 | Operário-MS | | |
| 1984 | Bahia | | |
| 1985–1986 | Figueirense | | |
| 1986 | Próspera | | |
| 1986–1987 | Operário-MS | | |
| 1987 | Saltense | | |

Managerial career
- 1994: Náutico
- 1995: Barra Mansa
- * Club domestic league appearances and goals as of 21 January 2024

Ozires de Paiva (born 29 January 1952), is a Brazilian former professional footballer who played as a defender.

== Career ==
Revealed at Botafogo, Ozires was notable for his great performances at Fortaleza in 1974 Campeonato Brasileiro Série A. He was appointed by Zezé Moreira at Cruzeiro as Roberto Perfumo replacement for the defense, and at the club he was part of the winning squad of the 1976 Copa Libertadores. In 1982, again for Cruzeiro, he scored the title goal, from a penalty, in the Minas Gerais Cup final.

== Honours ==
Cruzeiro

- Copa Libertadores: 1976
- Campeonato Mineiro: 1977
- Taça Minas Gerais: 1982

Ríver

- Campeonato Piauiense: 1973

Fortaleza

- Campeonato Cearense: 1974

Operário

- Campeonato Sul-Mato-Grossense: 1983
