= Alejandro Sabella =

Argentine footballer and manager (1954–2020)

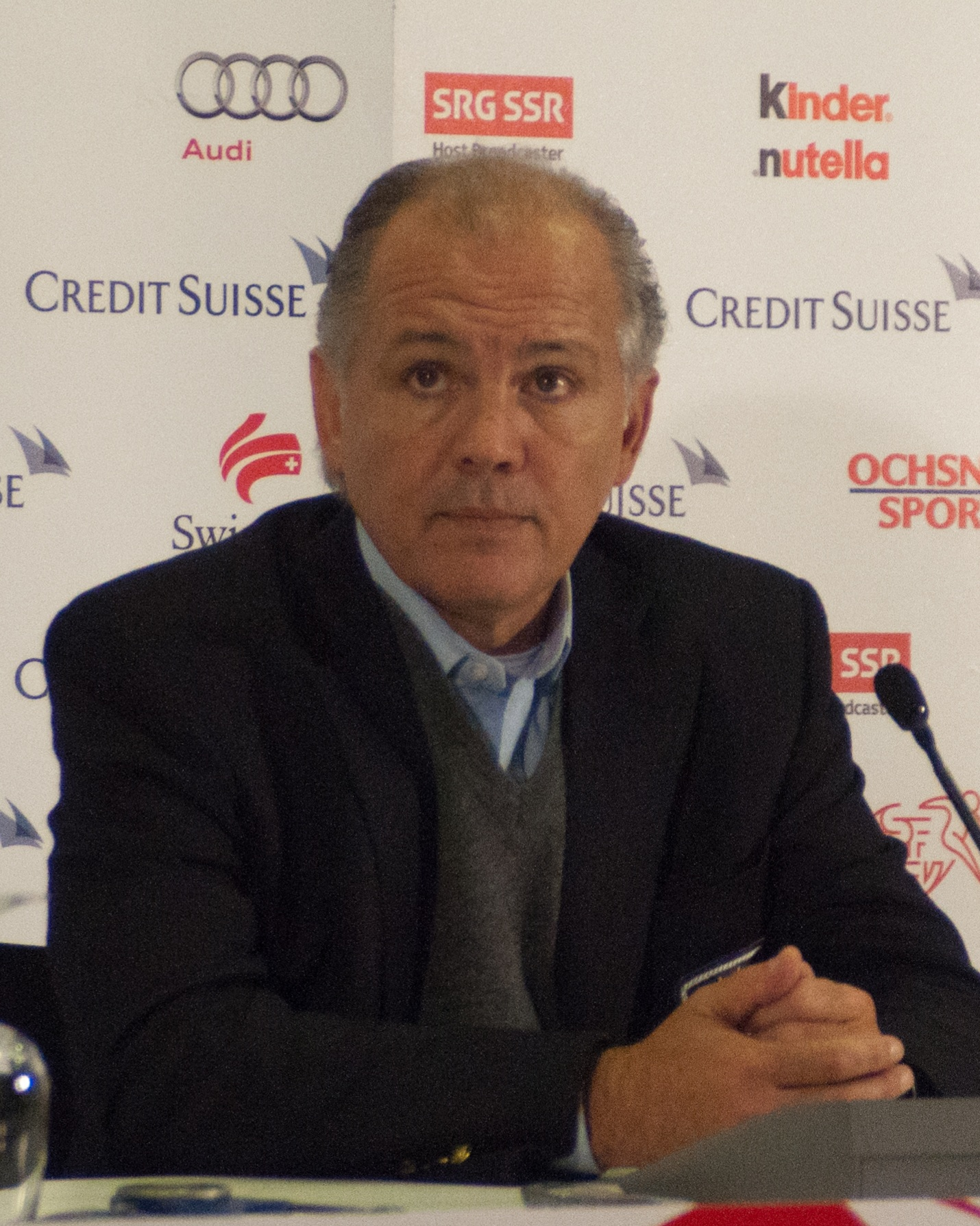
- Sabella during a press conference in 2012

Personal information
- Full name: Alejandro Javier Sabella
- Date of birth: 5 November 1954
- Place of birth: Buenos Aires, Argentina
- Date of death: 8 December 2020 (aged 66)
- Place of death: Buenos Aires, Argentina
- Height: 1.71 m (5 ft 7 in)
- Position: Midfielder

Senior career*
Years	Team	Apps	(Gls)
1974–1978	River Plate	117	(11)
1978–1980	Sheffield United	76	(8)
1980–1981	Leeds United	23	(2)
1982–1987	Estudiantes (LP)	149	(10)
1985	→ Grêmio (loan)	10	(0)
1987–1988	Ferro Carril Oeste	27	(2)
1988–1989	Irapuato	31	(0)
Total		433	(33)

International career
1983–1984	Argentina	8	(0)

Managerial career
- 1995: Qatar U20
- 2009–2011: Estudiantes
- 2011–2014: Argentina
Medal record
Men's football
Representing Argentina (as manager)
FIFA World Cup
Runner-up	2014 Brazil
- * Club domestic league appearances and goals

Alejandro Javier Sabella (locally [saˈβeʃa]; 5 November 1954 – 8 December 2020) was an Argentine football player and manager. Born in Buenos Aires, he began his playing career with River Plate in his home country before moving to England in 1978 to play for Sheffield United. He then had a spell with another English side, Leeds United, before returning to South America and representing Estudiantes, Grêmio, Ferro Carril Oeste and Irapuato.

After retiring from playing, Sabella became a coach and began a long association with fellow countryman and close friend Daniel Passarella, serving as his assistant manager during Passarella's spells managing Argentina, Italian club Parma, Uruguay, Mexican club Monterrey and Corinthians in Brazil. The duo finally returned to River Plate for whom they had both played before Sabella struck out on his own to become manager of Estudiantes in his own right, winning the Argentine Primera División Apertura championship and the 2009 Copa Libertadores. Sabella resigned from Estudiantes in February 2011 and was subsequently appointed as the coach of the Argentina national team, coaching them to the 2014 FIFA World Cup Final against Germany, where they lost 1–0 in extra time. Sabella had scheduled his resignation to take effect after the conclusion of the World Cup.

Sabella died on 8 December 2020, due to an infection caught during a stay in hospital.

== Playing career ==
=== Early life and career ===
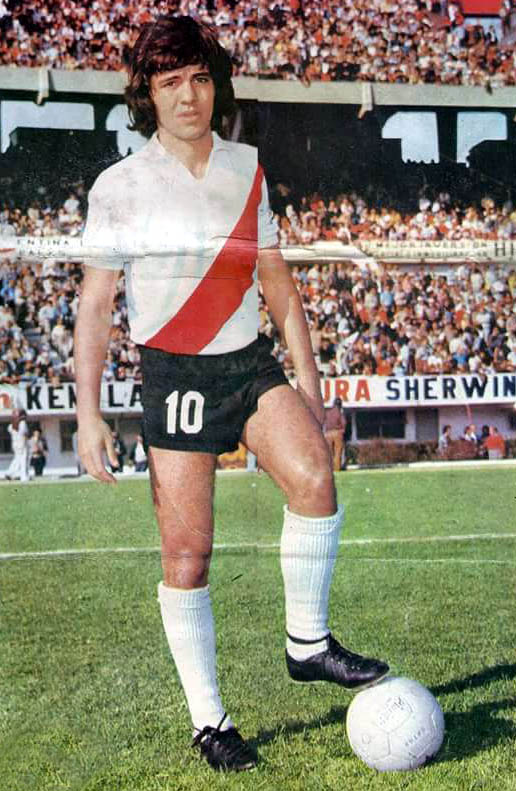
Sabella playing for River Plate in the mid-1970s

Alejandro Sabella was born to a middle-class family in Buenos Aires' well-off Palermo neighborhood. He was an excellent student at school, and was admitted to the Faculty of Law of the University of Buenos Aires, but his career as a football player eventually forced him to abandon his studies. As a young man Sabella was politically active in the left-wing Peronist Youth and worked to aid the urban poor in the slums. He stated, "I felt a growing need to be always on the side of solidarity and of the distribution of wealth for a fairer, more egalitarian society, in which we can all have equal opportunities."

As a footballer, Sabella rose through the junior divisions of River Plate in the early 1970s, when his position of attacking midfielder was covered by Norberto Alonso. His style reflected Alonso's, with emphasis on individual technique and short passes. His slow pace gained him the nickname of Pachorra (lunfardo, Spanish for "slowcoach"). In 1975, River Plate won their first title after an 18-year drought, and Alonso became the fans' undisputed hero. Sabella got his break in 1976, when Alonso was transferred to Marseille. He played a key role when River won the 1977 Metropolitano championship. Nevertheless, when Alonso returned to River Plate, Sabella was again relegated to the bench.

=== Sheffield United ===
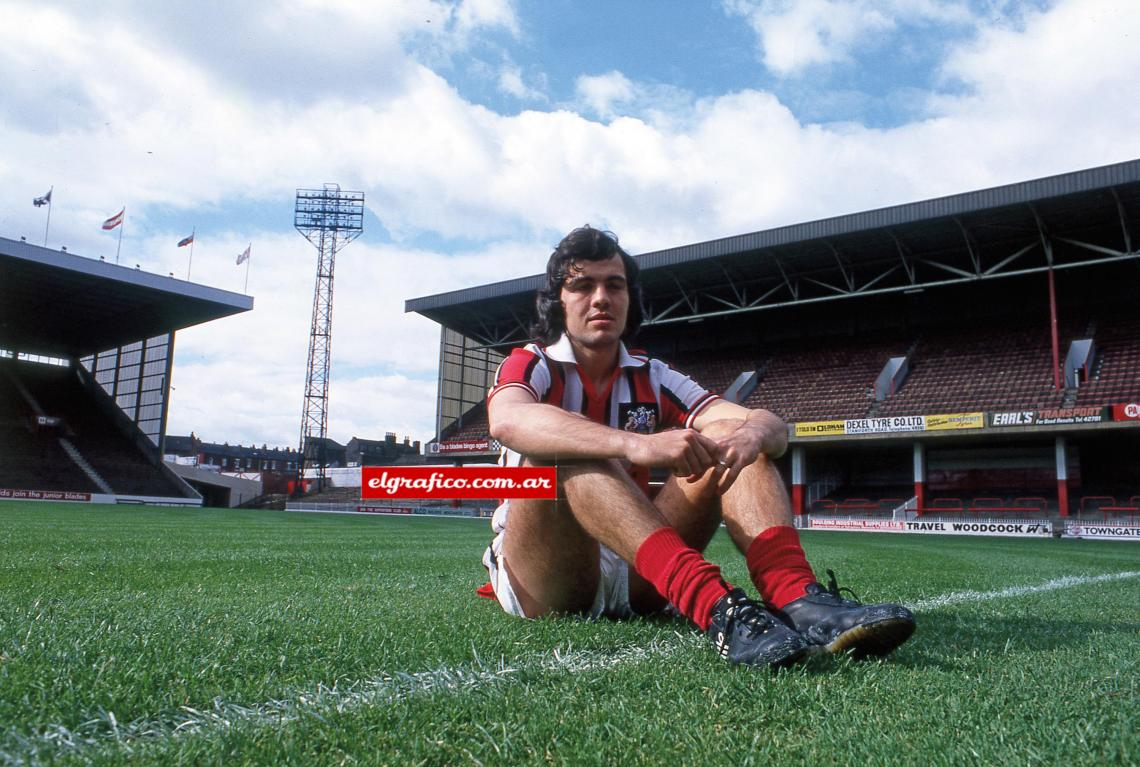
Sabella with Sheffield United in 1978.

Second Division side Sheffield United had tried to sign Diego Maradona from Argentinos Juniors. However, the club decided that Maradona was too expensive, and instead turned to Sabella, whom they signed for £160,000 on 19 July 1978. Known as Alex while in England, Sabella made his debut for the Blades in a 2–1 defeat against Leyton Orient on 19 August 1978.

Sabella played for United until 1980, scoring eight league goals in 76 appearances. After relegation to the Third Division, manager Harry Haslam agreed a fee of £600,000 with Second Division club Sunderland. However, Sabella had ambitions to play in the First Division and refused to go. His last appearance for United came with a goal in the final of the Sheffield & Hallamshire County Cup, (a regional competition between South Yorkshire teams) giving victory over Sheffield Wednesday on 8 May 1980.

=== Leeds United and return to Argentina ===
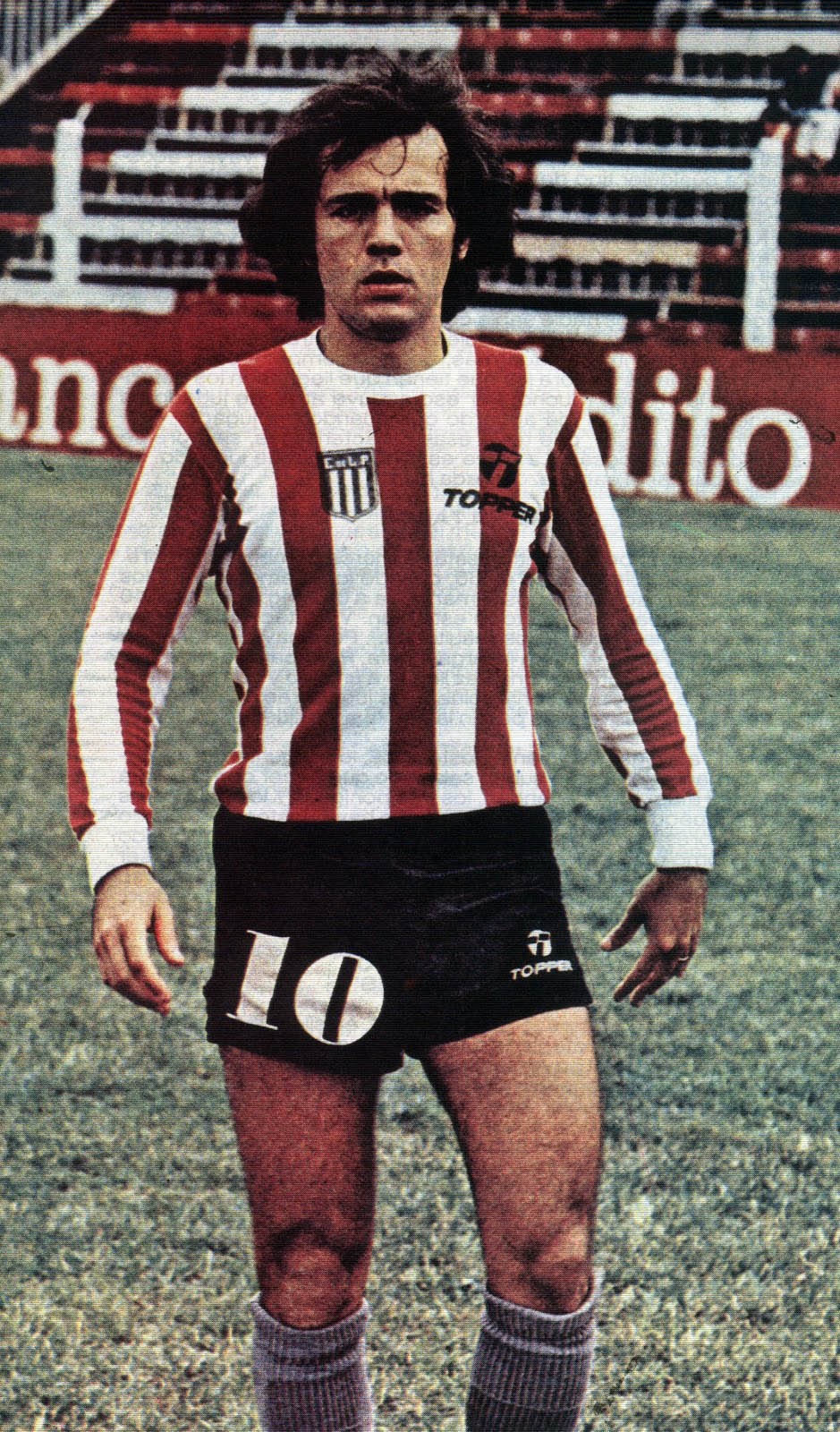
At his return to Argentina, Sabella signed with Estudiantes de La Plata in 1981

During the close season, Sabella was sold to First Division Leeds United for £400,000. He played for Leeds without much success between 1980 and 1981, making 23 appearances and scoring two goals. John Lukic used to give him a lift to training and matches from Sabella's digs in Sheffield.

In December 1981, Sabella started looking for an Argentine club and was eventually sold to Estudiantes de La Plata. Under coach Carlos Bilardo, the team reached the semi-finals of the 1982 Nacional tournament (Sabella was injured in the first semi-final match against Quilmes). Subsequently, Sabella, together with Marcelo Trobbiani, José Daniel Ponce and Miguel Ángel Russo, made up the solid midfield of the Estudiantes team that went on to win two back-to-back championship titles.

When Bilardo was put in charge of the Argentina national team, Sabella competed for his place with veterans Norberto Alonso and Ricardo Bochini, as well as younger players like Carlos Daniel Tapia, Jorge Burruchaga and Diego Maradona. Sabella played eight times for the national team, playing in all four games in the 1983 Copa América and in four friendlies; against Chile in May 1983 (as substitute), Paraguay in July 1983, Brazil in June 1984 and Uruguay in July 1984.

=== Later career ===
The Argentine midfielder then moved to Brazilian Grêmio, where he played from 1985 to 1986. He subsequently returned to Estudiantes, but retired after a short spell in the Mexican league with Irapuato in 1989.

== Managerial career ==
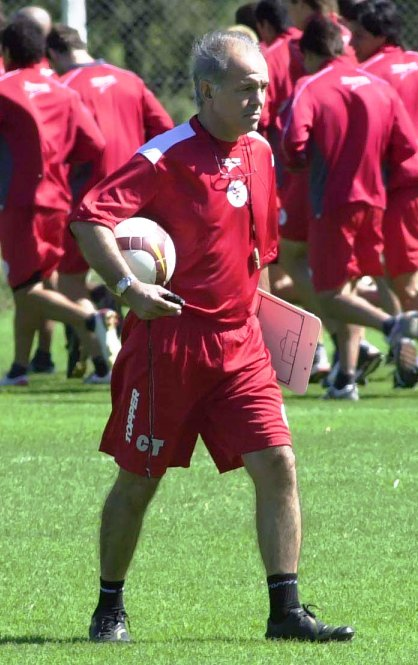
Sabella managing Estudiantes de La Plata in 2009

=== Early career ===
After retirement, Sabella became a coach, but worked mostly as field assistant for Daniel Passarella. The duo coached the Argentina national team, Italian side Parma, the Uruguay national football team, Mexican Monterrey, and Brazilian Corinthians. In 2006, they were hired back by River Plate, that finished in third place in the Apertura tournament.

On 15 March 2009, Sabella became coach of Estudiantes de La Plata, where he won the 2009 Copa Libertadores. On 2 February 2011, he announced his resignation. Due to protestations from the team's players and management, he agreed to reconsider his decision, but made it final the following day. He officially resigned on 3 February 2011.

=== Argentina ===
After Argentina's early exit at the 2011 Copa América, Sabella was appointed as the manager of the Argentina national team. Sabella was originally set to be the new coach of UAE League team Al-Jazira Club but backed out of the agreement after the Argentine Football Association (AFA) had shown interest in him. After his appointment in August 2011, Sabella named Lionel Messi as Argentina's new captain. He made his debut in charge of the Argentina in a 1–0 victory against Venezuela at Salt Lake Stadium in Kolkata, India.

==== 2014 World Cup ====
In the 2014 FIFA World Cup, Sabella coached Argentina to the final. The last time Argentina had advanced beyond the quarter-finals was when they made the final in 1990 where they lost 1–0 to West Germany.

Argentina never trailed during the whole tournament until the final. They won all three of their group games, where Lionel Messi scored all four of his goals against Bosnia and Herzegovina (2–1), Iran (1–0) and Nigeria (3–2). They defeated Switzerland 1–0 in extra time during the Round of 16, and then dispatched Belgium 1–0 in the quarter-finals. Reaching their first semi-final since 1990, Argentina eliminated the Netherlands in a penalty shootout after a scoreless draw. Argentina finished the tournament as runners-up after losing the final to Germany 1–0 through an extra time goal scored by Mario Götze. Sabella's substitutions in the final, notably Sergio Agüero for Ezequiel Lavezzi and Rodrigo Palacio for Gonzalo Higuaín, were said to have blunted the team's attacking threat against the Germans, although many managers, such as Atlético Madrid's Diego Simeone, praised Sabella's tactical performance throughout the World Cup.

Sabella officially resigned on 30 July 2014.

== Political views and public image ==
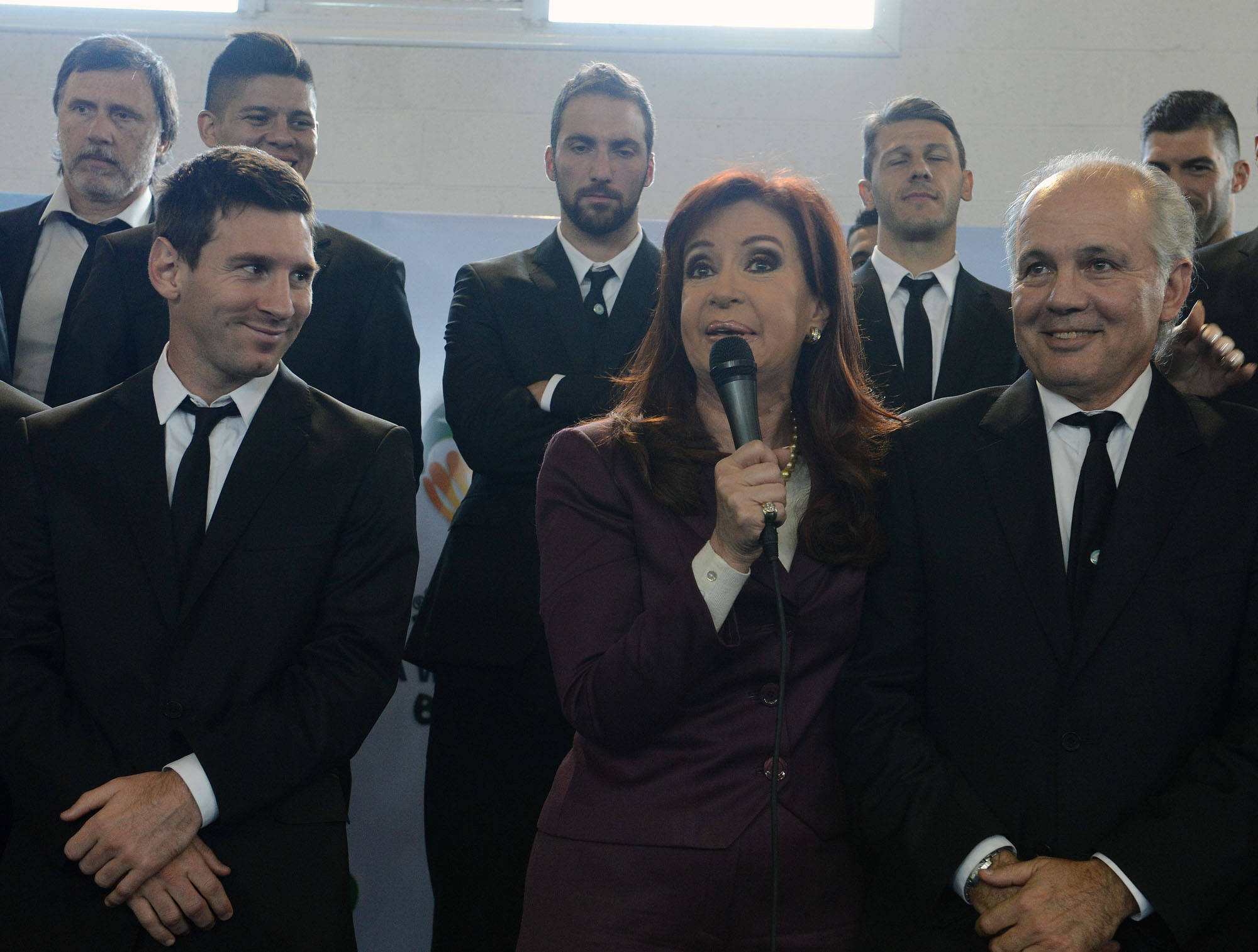
Sabella (right) with Cristina Fernández de Kirchner and Lionel Messi in 2014

Sabella was interested in politics and history and had strong political views. He was a left-wing Peronist, and believed that "the state needs to be present to regulate politics and mark the path. We can't wait for the trickle-down effect to overflow, because that is a lie." In an interview he gave to La Garganta Poderosa, an Argentine alternative media outlet, he posed before a chalkboard with a "Dream Team" made up not of football players, but left-wing activists who have been killed or have gone missing since the return of democracy in 1983, many of them young victims of police violence.

== Death ==
Sabella was admitted to hospital on 25 November 2020 with cardiac problems. He caught a virus in hospital, and died on 8 December 2020. He was 66 years old.

== Managerial statistics ==
As of 14 November 2014

Team	From	To	Record								
Team	From	To	G	W	D	L	GF	GA	GD	Win %	Ref.
Estudiantes	15 March 2009	3 February 2011	97	58	21	18	151	69	+82	59.79	
Argentina	2 August 2011	30 July 2014	40	25	10	5	74	32	+42	62.50	
Total			137	83	31	23	225	101	+124	60.58	—

== Honours ==
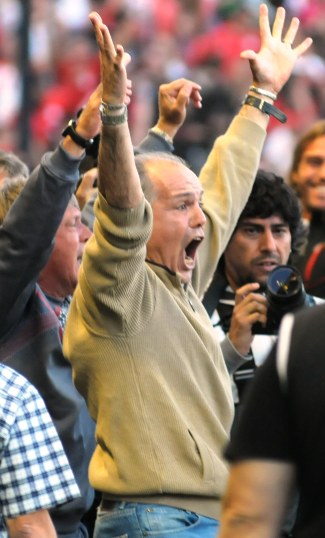
Sabella celebrates after winning the Apertura title with Estudiantes in 2010.

=== Player ===
River Plate

- Primera División: 1975 Metropolitano, 1975 Nacional, 1977 Metropolitano
- Copa Libertadores runner-up: 1976

Estudiantes (LP)

- Primera División: 1982 Metropolitano, 1983 Nacional

Grêmio

- Campeonato Gaúcho: 1985, 1986

=== Manager ===
Estudiantes (LP)

- Copa Libertadores: 2009
- Primera División: 2010 Apertura
- FIFA Club World Cup runner-up: 2009
- Recopa Sudamericana runner-up: 2010

Argentina

- FIFA World Cup runner-up: 2014
