= João Soares Almeida =

João Soares Almeida may refer to:

- João Soares Almeida Filho (born 1954), Brazilian footballer
- João Soares de Almeida Neto (born 1980), Brazilian footballer
