= Darci Menezes =

Brazilian footballer

Personal information
- Full name: Darci Menezes
- Date of birth: 24 September 1949 (age 77)
- Place of birth: Bagé, Brazil
- Position: Centre-back

Youth career
- 1961-1964: Guarany de Bagé
- 1965-1966: Cruzeiro

Senior career*
| Years | Team | Apps | (Gls) |
| 1967–1977 | Cruzeiro | 348 | (15) |
| 1971 | → América Mineiro (loan) | | |
| 1978–1979 | Vitória | | |
| 1979 | Atlético Goianiense | | |
| 1980–1982 | Democrata-GV | | |
- * Club domestic league appearances and goals as of 28 November 2023

Darci Menezes (born 24 September 1949), is a Brazilian former professional footballer who played as a centre-back.

== Career ==
Born in Bagé, Darci was successful in football in Minas Gerais, being part of the Cruzeiro squad in the 70s, several times state champion, twice Brazilian runner-up and champion of the 1976 Copa Libertadores. He also won the Taça Minas Gerais in 1981 with the Democrata of Governador Valadares.

Darci was inducted into the Cruzeiro EC Hall of Fame in 2012.

== Internacional career ==
Darci was part of the Brazil national team squad that competed in the 1975 Copa América, when players from Minas Gerais mostly formed the team.

== Honours ==
Cruzeiro

- Copa Libertadores: 1976
- Campeonato Mineiro: 1968, 1969, 1972, 1973, 1974, 1975, 1977
- Taça Minas Gerais: 1973

Democrata-GV

- Taça Minas Gerais: 1981
