= Ubaldo Fillol =

Argentine footballer

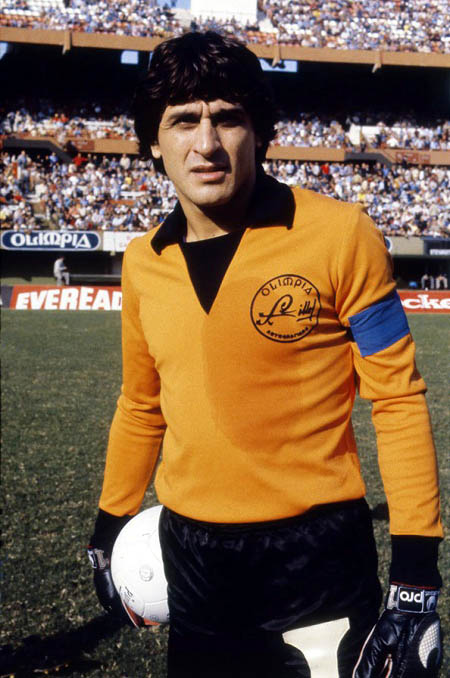
- Fillol in River Plate, where he stayed ten years

Personal information
- Full name: Ubaldo Matildo Fillol
- Date of birth: 21 July 1950 (age 76)
- Place of birth: San Miguel del Monte, Buenos Aires, Argentina
- Height: 1.81 m (5 ft 11 in)
- Position: Goalkeeper

Senior career*
Years	Team	Apps	(Gls)
1968–1971	Quilmes	57	(0)
1971–1973	Racing Club	59	(0)
1973–1983	River Plate	360	(0)
1983–1984	Argentinos Juniors	17	(0)
1984–1985	Flamengo	34	(0)
1985–1986	Atlético Madrid	17	(0)
1986–1989	Racing Club	71	(0)
1989–1991	Vélez Sársfield	42	(0)
Total		657	(0)

International career
1974–1985	Argentina	58	(0)

Managerial career
- 2004: Racing Club
Medal record
Representing Argentina
FIFA World Cup
Winner	1978 Argentina
- * Club domestic league appearances and goals

Ubaldo Matildo Fillol ([uˈβaldo maˈtildo fiˈʎol]; born 21 July 1950), nicknamed el Pato (lit. 'the Duck'), is an Argentine former professional footballer who played as a goalkeeper. He took part in the 1974, 1978 (where he won the championship with his team and was voted Best Goalkeeper) and 1982 World Cups representing the Argentina national team. He also played in the South American qualifiers for the 1986 World Cup, but he was finally not chosen for the final team that played (and won) in Mexico. He is considered one of the best Argentine goalkeepers ever.

== Playing career ==
Born in San Miguel del Monte, Fillol took his first steps as goalkeeper in an amateur club of the city, where he spent four years. Former River Plate player and manager Renato Cesarini would be his mentor after seeing him play at the regional league. In 1965 Fillol arrived to Quilmes A.C. to play at club's youth divisions. At the age of 18, Fillol debuted in the Argentine top division playing for Quilmes vs. Huracán on 1 May 1969. He soon drew public attraction due to his agility and quick reflexes that allowed him to make acrobatic saves.

In the 1970 Metropolitano championship Fillol stopped the first penalty in his career to Gimnasia y Esgrima LP forward Delio Onnis. That same year Quilmes would be relegated to Primera B, where Fillol played 23 matches with the club. In 1972 Fillol was signed by Racing Club de Avellaneda, debuting in the 1972 Metropolitano tournament. In that championship, Fillol set a record of six penalties saved, the highest in Argentine football for a single season.

In 1973 Fillol was transferred to River Plate, where he would play for most of his career. At River Plate, Fillol won seven titles, including the 1975 Metropolitano tournament, the club's first title in 18 years. In 1977 Fillol was awarded the footballer of the Year of Argentina, being the first goalkeeper ever to receive the distinction.

He was called up for the Argentina national team, where he was part of the roster at the 1974 World Cup (the other goalkeepers were Daniel Carnevali and Miguel Ángel Santoro). Fillol's most notable performance with Argentina was in 1978, when Argentina won its first World Cup and Fillol was chosen as the best goalkeeper of the competition.

In 1983, after a conflict with River Plate management (during which he considered retiring) Fillol was transferred to Argentinos Juniors by request of former River coach Ángel Labruna, who was managing Argentinos at the time. Fillol played 17 matches there. In November that year, he moved to Brazil to play for Flamengo. There, he won the Taça Guanabara with the club in 1984.

Fillol's debut in European football was in 1985 when he was transferred to Atlético Madrid at the age of 35. With Fillol as goalkeeper, the club won the 1985 Supercopa de España. In 1986 Fillol returned to Racing, where he won the first edition of the Supercopa Sudamericana in 1988, which was also the club's first international title since the 1967 Intercontinental Cup

The best goalkeeper I've ever seen was Ubaldo Fillol"

— Diego Maradona remembering Fillol's retirement, 22 December 2017

At the age of 40, Fillol retired from football ending his career in Vélez Sarsfield in the last match of the 1990 Apertura championship, a 2–1 win over River Plate at the Estadio Monumental on 22 December 1990. Fillol had an outstanding performance, even stopping a penalty from forward Rubén da Silva. Fillol also held the record of 26 penalties stopped, the highest in Argentine football, sharing this record with Hugo Gatti.

== Coaching career ==
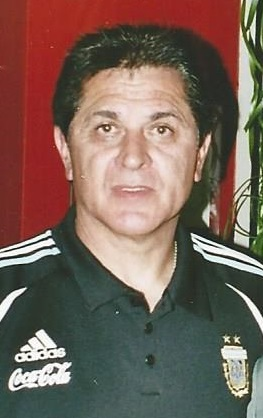
Fillol during his tenure as goalkeeping coach in Argentina, 2006

After his retirement, Fillol served as goalkeeping coach for the Argentine national team until he became the head coach for Racing Club in 2003. After a short tenure as Racing manager, Fillol returned to his role as goalkeeping coach for Argentina, also working at the 2006 FIFA World Cup. Nevertheless, Fillol left his charge when José Pekerman resigned as Argentina manager.

Fillol continued his career coaching goalkeepers at River Plate, but he resigned after a match against San Lorenzo in which Juan Pablo Carrizo refused to accept his gesture of support after a mistake that allowed the rival team to score a goal. Fillol alleged he felt "humiliated" by Carrizo and showed his desire to continue in the club but only working with youth players, as he had done before. Finally, Fillol would return to River Plate in 2014, serving as director of club's goalkeepers section.

== Rivalry ==
For his River Plate career, he was the counterpart of Hugo Orlando Gatti, another Argentine goalkeeper who played in the nemesis team, Boca Juniors. Fillol was the image of professionalism and seriousness; "Madman" Gatti, on the other hand, looked eccentric, unorthodox.

== Trivia ==
At the 1978 World Cup, Fillol wore the number 5 jersey, instead of 1 which is the standard for goalkeepers. This happened because Argentina, at that time, gave players their numbers alphabetically. The number 1 jersey was worn by offensive midfielder Norberto Alonso. For the same reason, Fillol wore the number 7 jersey at the 1982 tournament while Osvaldo Ardiles (another midfielder) wore the number 1. This practice was last permitted in 1986, when FIFA stated that the number 1 shirt should only be worn by goalkeepers.

== Honours ==
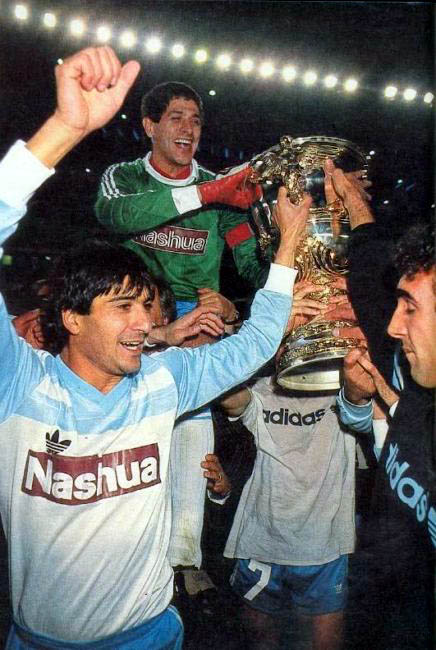
Fillol celebrating the 1988 Supercopa Libertadores won with Racing Club

River Plate

- Primera División (7): 1975 Metropolitano, 1975 Nacional, 1977 Metropolitano, 1979 Metropolitano, 1979 Nacional, 1980 Metropolitano, 1981 Nacional
- Copa Libertadores runner-up: 1976

Flamengo

- Taça Guanabara: 1984
- Taça Rio: 1985

Atlético Madrid

- Supercopa de España: 1985
- UEFA Cup Winners' Cup runner-up: 1985–86

Racing Club

- Supercopa Libertadores: 1988

Argentina

- FIFA World Cup: 1978

Individual

- Footballer of the Year of Argentina: 1977
- FIFA World Cup All-Star Team: 1978
- Silver ball South American Player of the Year: 1978, 1983, 1984
- El Grafico (Note: Americas footballer of the year by El Grafico was an award that included over 130 journalists/tv broadcasters from all over the Americas continent) 3d Best South American Player of the Year: 1981 (Note: Fillol finished 3d, while Zico was second (524 pts) and Diego Maradona first (572 pts))
- AFA Team of All Time (published 2015)
- IFFHS Argentina All Times Dream Team (Team B): 2021
- South American Team of the 20th Century

== See also ==
- Ubaldo Fillol Award
