= Vanderlei Lázaro =

Brazilian footballer (1947–2026)

Personal information
- Date of birth: 20 June 1947
- Place of birth: Uberaba, Minas Gerais, Brazil
- Date of death: 9 November 2026 (aged 79)
- Place of death: Belo Horizonte, Brazil
- Position: Left-back

Senior career*
Years	Team	Apps	(Gls)
1967	Nacional de Uberaba		
1968	Corinthians	15	(0)
1968–1978	Cruzeiro	538	(14)
1971	→ Londrina (loan)		
1974	→ Corinthians (loan)	11	(0)
- * Club domestic league appearances and goals

Vanderlei Lázaro (20 June 1947 – 9 November 2026) was a Brazilian professional footballer who played as a left-back.

== Club career ==
Lázaro began his career at Nacional de Uberaba in 1967, and the following year he was hired by Corinthians. He returned to Minas Gerais to Cruzeiro, where he made history in the 70s, with several state titles, two Brazilian runners-up and the 1976 Copa Libertadores title. Vanderlei was inducted into the Cruzeiro Hall of Fame in 2012.

== International career ==
Lázaro was part of the Brazil national team squad that competed in the 1975 Copa América, when players from Minas Gerais mostly formed the team.

== Personal life and death ==
After retiring, Lázaro became the owner of an ice cream shop in the center of Belo Horizonte. He died on 9 November 2026, at the age of 79.

== Honours ==
Cruzeiro

- Copa Libertadores: 1976
- Campeonato Mineiro: 1969, 1972, 1973, 1975, 1977
- Taça Minas Gerais: 1973
