= Morais (footballer, born 1948) =

Brazilian footballer (1948–1999)

Personal information
- Full name: José Francisco de Morais
- Date of birth: 26 July 1948
- Place of birth: Belo Horizonte, Brazil
- Date of death: 4 September 1999 (aged 51)
- Place of death: Botucatu, Brazil
- Position: Centre-back

Senior career*
Years	Team	Apps	(Gls)
1968	Uberlândia		
1968	Democrata-GV		
1969	Uberlândia		
1969–1978	Cruzeiro	273	(11)
1970	→ Democrata-GV (loan)		
1971	→ Ceará (loan)		
1973	→ Comercial-MS (loan)		
1974	→ Sampaio Corrêa (loan)		
1978	América-SP		
1978–1980	Uberlândia		
1980	Araxá		
1980	Barretos		

International career
1975	Brazil	Called up	

Managerial career
- 1985: Cruzeiro
- 1987: Democrata-GV
- 1990: Araxá
- 1991: Grêmio Maringá
- 1993: Araxá
- 1994: Democrata-GV
- * Club domestic league appearances and goals as of 28 November 2023

José Francisco de Morais (26 July 1948 – 4 September 1999) was a Brazilian footballer who played as a defender for Uberlândia and Cruzeiro, scoring two goals for the latter in their 1977 Copa Libertadores campaign. He was in Brazil’s squad for the 1975 Copa América.

== Death ==
Morais died in a road accident near the city of Botucatu, 4 September 1999 at the age of 51.

== Honours ==
Cruzeiro

- Copa Libertadores: 1976
- Campeonato Mineiro: 1969, 1972, 1973, 1975, 1977
- Taça Minas Gerais: 1973
