= Roberto Perfumo =

Argentine footballer and sports commentator

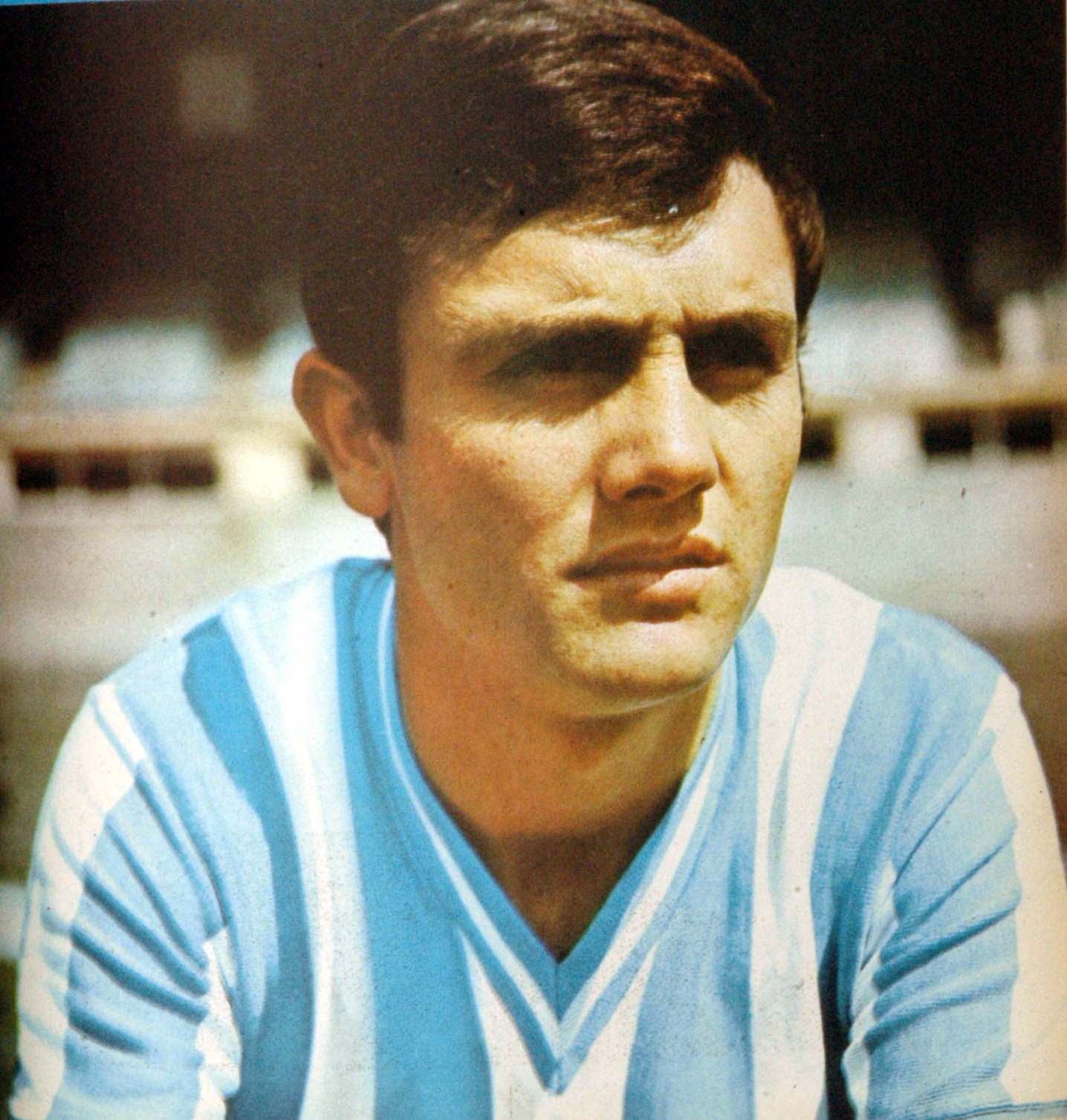
- Perfumo in 1969

Personal information
- Full name: Roberto Alfredo Perfumo
- Date of birth: 3 October 1942
- Place of birth: Sarandí, Argentina
- Date of death: 10 March 2016 (aged 73)
- Place of death: Buenos Aires, Argentina
- Height: 1.79 m (5 ft 10 in)
- Position: Defender

Youth career
- 1960–1961: River Plate

Senior career*
Years	Team	Apps	(Gls)
1962–1970	Racing Club	207	(14)
1971–1974	Cruzeiro	141	(6)
1975–1978	River Plate	110	(4)
Total		458	(24)

International career
1964–1974	Argentina	37	(0)
- * Club domestic league appearances and goals

Roberto Alfredo Perfumo (3 October 1942 – 10 March 2016) was an Argentine footballer and sports commentator. Nicknamed El Mariscal, Perfumo is considered one of the best Argentine defenders ever. At club level, Perfumo played for Racing, River Plate and Brazilian team Cruzeiro. With the national team, he played the 1966 and 1974 World Cups.

== Biography ==
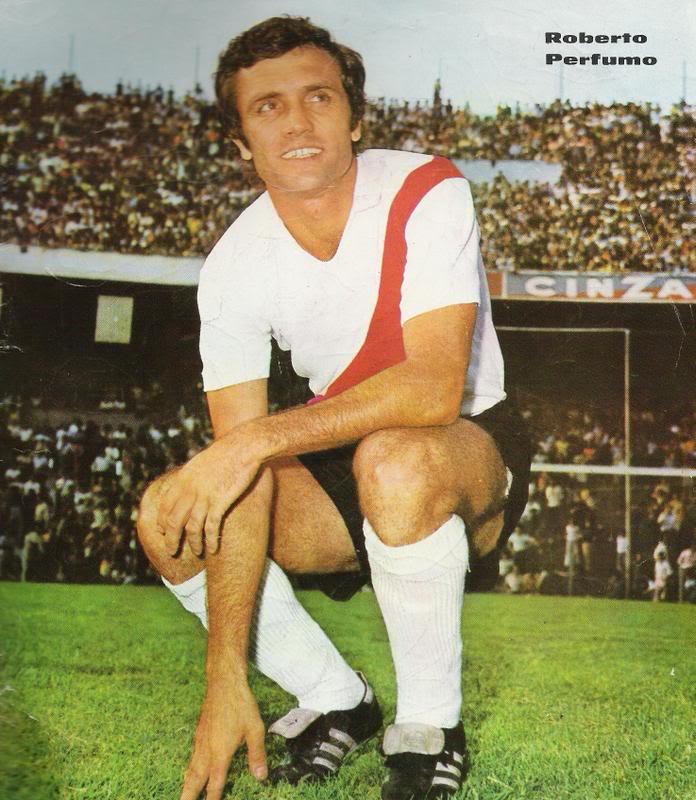
El Mariscal Perfumo in River Plate (1975)

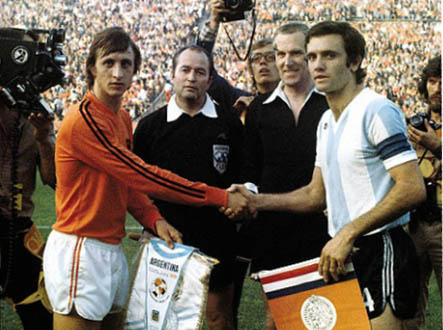
Perfumo with Johan Cruyff at the 1974 FIFA World Cup

Perfumo was born in Sarandí and his first approach to football was to play in his neighborhood team, named "Pulqui". In 1960 he debuted at the 5th. division of River Plate. Perfumo then became player of Racing Club, where he debuted in January 1964 in a friendly match against Flamengo played at Santiago, Chile.

Perfumo's first position at the field was midfielder but he began to play as right back in the Racing reserve team. He debuted in Primera División promoted by Néstor Rossi during a match against Ferro Carril Oeste. Playing with Racing Club Perfumo was regarded as one of the best Argentine defenders, winning the Primera title, the Copa Libertadores and the Intercontinental Cup. In all those tournaments Perfumo was praised by media and fans as the most notable player of Racing Club.

After retirement, he worked as a football commentator for ESPN and for TV Pública show Fútbol para todos.

Perfumo died at 73 from a skull injury after falling from a stairway while dining with fellow journalists at a Buenos Aires restaurant in the neighbourhood of Puerto Madero, on 10 March 2016.

== Honours ==
=== Player ===
Racing Club

- Primera División (2): 1961, 1966
- Copa Libertadores (1): 1967
- Intercontinental Cup (1): 1967
- Intercontinental Champions' Supercup runner-up: 1969

Cruzeiro

- Campeonato Mineiro (3): 1972, 1973, 1974
- Campeonato Brasileiro runner-up: 1974

River Plate

- Primera División (3): 1975 Metropolitano, 1975 Nacional, 1977 Metropolitano
- Copa Libertadores runner-up: 1976

Argentina

- CONMEBOL Pre-Olympic Tournament: 1964

=== Manager ===
Gimnasia y Esgrima La Plata

- Copa Centenario (1): 1993

=== Individual ===
- Diario La Nación 25 Argentinian Heroes: 1998
- Martín Fierro Awards Best Sports Journalism: 2009
- Clarín Awards Greatest Argentinian Central Defenders of All times: 2013
- AFA Team of All Time (published 2015)
- IFFHS Argentina All Times Dream Team: 2021
