= Eduardo Amorim (footballer) =

Brazilian footballer and manager (born 1950)

Personal information
- Full name: Eduardo Fernandes Amorim
- Date of birth: 30 November 1950 (age 75)
- Place of birth: Montes Claros, Brazil
- Position: Midfielder

Senior career*
| Years | Team | Apps | (Gls) |
| 1969–1981 | Cruzeiro | | |
| 1981–1987 | Corinthians | | |
| 1988 | Santo André | | |

Managerial career
- 1994: Corinthians (interim)
- 1995–1996: Corinthians
- 1996–1997: Atlético Mineiro
- 1997: Sport Recife
- 1998: Kalamata
- 1998: América de Natal
- 1999–2000: Kalamata
- 2002–2005: Apollon Pontus
- 2005–2007: Messiniakos
- 2012: Funorte
- * Club domestic league appearances and goals

Eduardo Fernandes Amorim (born 30 November 1950), is a Brazilian professional football coach and former player. His professional playing career as a midfielder spanned nearly 20 years, during which he was mainly associated with Corinthians and Cruzeiro, where he won the 1976 Copa Libertadores.

== Honours ==
=== Player ===
Cruzeiro

- Campeonato Mineiro: 1972, 1973, 1974, 1975, 1977
- Copa Libertadores: 1976

Corinthians

- Campeonato Paulista: 1982, 1983

=== Manager ===
Corinthians

- Campeonato Paulista: 1995
- Copa do Brasil: 1995
