= Zé Carlos (footballer, born 1945) =

Brazilian footballer (1945–2018)

Personal information
- Full name: José Carlos Bernardo
- Date of birth: 28 April 1945
- Place of birth: Juiz de Fora, Mato Grosso, Brazil
- Date of death: 12 June 2018 (aged 73)
- Height: 1.72 m (5 ft 8 in)
- Position: Midfielder

Senior career*
Years	Team	Apps	(Gls)
1963–1964	Sport Club Juiz de Fora		
1965–1977	Cruzeiro		
1978–1979	Guarani		
1980	Botafogo		
1980	Bahia		
1981	Grêmio Maringá		
1981	Blumenau		
1982–1983	Villa Nova		
1983	Uberaba		

International career
1968–1975	Brazil	4	(0)

Managerial career
- 1987–1988: Botafogo
- * Club domestic league appearances and goals

José Carlos Bernardo (28 April 1945 – 12 June 2018), known as Zé Carlos, was a Brazilian footballer who played as a midfielder. He made four appearances for the Brazil national team from 1968 to 1975. He was also part of Brazil's squad for the 1975 Copa América tournament.
