= Juan José López =

Argentine footballer and manager

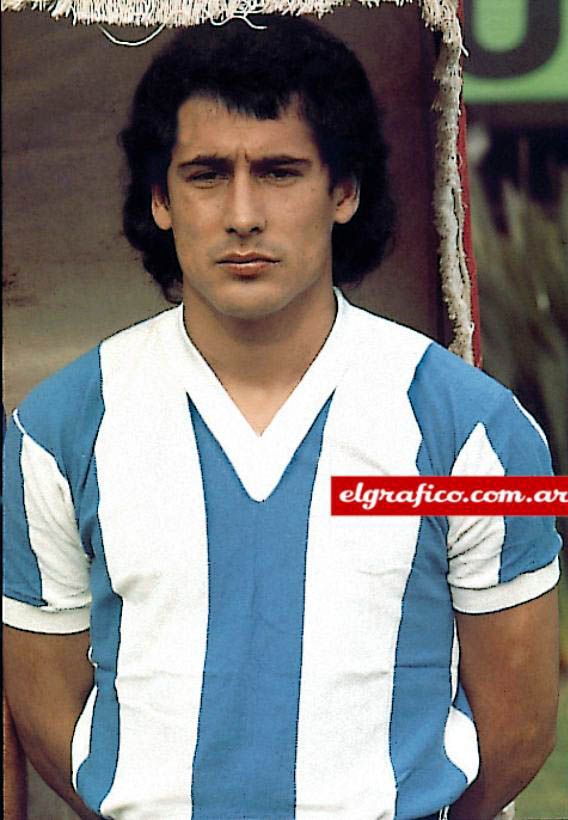
- López with Argentina in 1974

Personal information
- Full name: Juan José López
- Date of birth: 31 October 1950 (age 76)
- Place of birth: Guernica, Buenos Aires, Argentina
- Position: Midfielder

Senior career*
Years	Team	Apps	(Gls)
1970–1981	River Plate	424	(75)
1982	Talleres de Córdoba	38	(8)
1983	Boca Juniors	38	(6)
1984–1986	Argentinos Juniors	53	(5)
1986–1987	Belgrano	?	(?)

International career
1972–1974	Argentina	1	(1)

Managerial career
- 1995–1996: Rosario Central
- 1997: Racing
- 1998: Instituto
- 1999: Unión
- 2000: Instituto
- 2001: Talleres
- 2001–2002: Rosario Central
- 2002–2003: Unión
- 2004: Talleres
- 2005: Libertad
- 2010–2011: River Plate
- * Club domestic league appearances and goals

Juan José "J. J." López, (born October 31, 1950) is an Argentine professional former football player and former manager who played as a midfielder. López spent the most part of his career in River Plate, where he won 7 titles. With Argentinos Juniors, where he played in the 1980s, López won four titles, including one Copa Libertadores.

== Playing career ==
=== Club ===
López started his playing career with River Plate in 1970. He became an important player at the club, winning seven league titles. He played 466 games and scored 84 goals. López is one of the most decorated players in the history of River Plate, and only three other players have played more games for the club (Amadeo Carrizo, Ángel Labruna and Reinaldo Merlo).

López left River Plate after the 1981 season to join Talleres de Córdoba, where he played during 1982. He was signed by River's rivals, Boca Juniors, in 1983, and played 38 games for the club with 6 goals scored.

In 1984, he joined Argentinos Juniors and helped them to secure their first ever Primera División title in the 1984 Metropolitano. The next season, Argentinos won their second championship, the 1985 Nacional; and followed it up with winning the Copa Libertadores. In 1986, López joined Belgrano, where he played until his retirement in 1987.

=== National team ===
During the 1970s, López played for the Argentina national football team.

== Managerial career ==
After retiring as a player, López has worked as the manager of several clubs in Argentina. His first managerial position was with Racing de Córdoba. He then managed Instituto, Unión de Santa Fe, Rosario Central and Olimpo.

López has also had two spells as manager of Talleres de Córdoba. In his second spell with the club, he led them to a third-place finish in the 2004 Clausura, but the club were relegated after losing a relegation playoff against Argentinos Juniors. In 2005, he took over as the manager of Libertad in Paraguay.

Since 2010, López works as a youth manager in River Plate. He has also worked as caretaker manager twice, after the departures of Leonardo Astrada first and then Ángel Cappa. During his second period as caretaker, López obtained 13 over 18 points in the last six games of the 2010 Apertura, rounding a 4th-place finish. Therefore, at the end of the tournament he was confirmed as the team's manager for the following championship by club president Daniel Passarella.

== Honours ==
River Plate

- Primera División: 1975 Metropolitano, 1975 Nacional, 1977 Metropolitano, 1977 Nacional, 1979 Metropolitano, 1979 Nacional, 1980 Metropolitano
- Copa Libertadores runner-up: 1976

Argentinos Juniors

- Primera División: 1984 Metropolitano, 1985 Nacional
- Copa Libertadores: 1985
- Copa Interamericana: 1985

== See also ==
River Plate relegation
