= Palhinha (footballer, born 1950) =

Brazilian footballer (1950–2023)

Personal information
- Full name: Vanderlei Eustáquio de Oliveira
- Date of birth: 11 June 1950
- Place of birth: Belo Horizonte, Minas Gerais, Brazil
- Date of death: 17 July 2023 (aged 73)
- Place of death: Belo Horizonte
- Height: 1.68 m (5 ft 6 in)
- Position: Forward

Senior career*
Years	Team	Apps	(Gls)
1969–1976	Cruzeiro	117	(37)
1977–1980	Corinthians	34	(12)
1980–1981	Atlético Mineiro	32	(11)
1982	Santos	11	(4)
1982	Vasco da Gama		
1983–1984	Cruzeiro	10	(4)
1985	América		

International career
1973–1979	Brazil	16	(3)

Managerial career
- 1985: América Mineiro
- 1987: Atlético Mineiro
- 1988: Rio Branco-MG
- 1989: Corinthians
- 1990–1992: União São João
- 1992: Inter de Limeira
- 1993: Ferroviário
- 1994: Inter de Limeira
- 1994: Cruzeiro
- 1995: Villa Nova
- 2002: Al-Tai
- * Club domestic league appearances and goals

Vanderlei Eustáquio de Oliveira (11 June 1950 – 17 July 2023), often known as Palhinha, was a Brazilian footballer who played as a forward.

== Club career ==
Palhinha started his football career in Cruzeiro in 1969 and had played for them until 1976. In the last season that he played for Cruzeiro, he was the top scorer of Copa Libertadores and helped the club to win the trophy for the first time. In 1977, he transferred to Corinthians and played there until 1980. In 1980, he transferred to Atlético Mineiro, the main rival of his former club Cruzeiro in the state of Minas Gerais. In the following years, he transferred to various clubs frequently. In 1982, he played for Santos FC, while he transferred to Vasco da Gama in the same year. In 1983, he was back to Cruzeiro, but only played for the club for two years. In 1985, he played for América in the Campeonato Mineiro and then retired after that year.

== International career ==
Palhinha represented the Brazil national team sixteen times during his peak era from 1973 to 1979, including leading the national team to the second runners-up in Copa América 1979. He scored three goals for his country in all his national team appearances.

== Death ==
Palhinha died on 17 July 2023, at the age of 73.

== Honours ==
Cruzeiro

- Copa Libertadores: 1976
