= Raul Plassmann =

Brazilian footballer

Personal information
- Full name: Raul Guilherme Plassmann
- Date of birth: September 27, 1944 (age 82)
- Place of birth: Antonina (PR), Brazil
- Position: Goalkeeper

Senior career*
Years	Team	Apps	(Gls)
1963–1964	Atlético Paranaense		
1964–1965	São Paulo		
1965–1978	Cruzeiro	557	(0)
1978–1983	Flamengo	227	(0)

International career
1975–1980	Brazil	9	(0)

Managerial career
- 1987: Cruzeiro
- 2003: Juventude
- 2004: Londrina
- * Club domestic league appearances and goals

Raul Guilherme Plassmann (born September 27, 1944, in Antonina, PR) is a Brazilian former football player and manager who played as a goalkeeper.

He made nearly 200 Campeonato Brasileiro appearances for Cruzeiro and Flamengo. At international level, he was a member of the Brazil squad that took part at the 1975 Copa América.

== Honours ==
Flamengo

- Rio State Championship 1978, 1979, 1979 (Especial), 1981
- Brazilian National Championship 1980, 1982, 1983
- Intercontinental Cup 1981
- Copa Libertadores de América: 1981

Cruzeiro

- Minas Gerais State Championship 1965, 1966, 1967, 1968, 1969, 1972, 1973, 1974, 1975, 1977
- Taça Brasil 1966
- Copa Libertadores de América: 1976
