= Nelinho =

Brazilian footballer

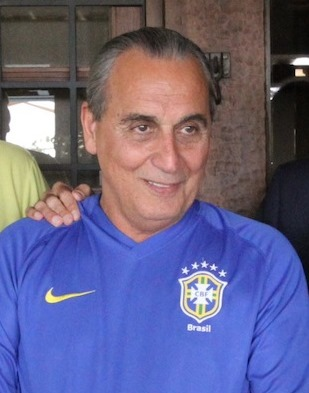
- Nelinho in 2014

Personal information
- Full name: Manoel Rezende de Mattos Cabral
- Date of birth: July 26, 1950 (age 76)
- Place of birth: Rio de Janeiro, Brazil
- Position: Right back

Youth career
- 1965: Olaria
- 1965–1970: América (RJ)

Senior career*
Years	Team	Apps	(Gls)
1970	América (RJ)		
1970–1971	Barreirense	6	(0)
1971	Anzoátegui		
1972	Bonsucesso		
1972	Remo	10	(0)
1973–1980	Cruzeiro	410	(43)
1980–1981	Grêmio	2	(1)
1981–1982	Cruzeiro	17	(4)
1982–1987	Atlético Mineiro	274	(52)
Total		755	(100)

International career
1974–1980	Brazil	21	(6)

Managerial career
- 1993: Atlético Mineiro
- 1994: Cruzeiro
Medal record
Representing Brazil
FIFA World Cup
Third place	1978 Argentina
- * Club domestic league appearances and goals

Manoel Rezende de Mattos Cabral (born July 26, 1950), known as Nelinho, is a Brazilian former association footballer who played as right back. He played for several clubs in his home country and abroad, including Belo Horizonte rivals Cruzeiro and Atlético Mineiro. Nelinho also represented the Brazil national team in two FIFA World Cups.

== Club career ==
Born in Rio de Janeiro, the son of Portuguese immigrants from Ovar, Nelinho started his career at local club Olaria, but signed his first professional contract with América. After a recommendation by Otto Glória, then manager of the team, he moved to Portugal to play for Barreirense. A brief stint with Venezuela's Deportivo Anzoátegui followed, before returning to Rio de Janeiro to play for Bonsucesso, which then loaned him to Remo. After good performances in the 1972 Brasileirão, Nelinho was signed by Cruzeiro for the following season.

At the Belo Horizonte-based club, Nelinho won the Campeonato Mineiro four times between 1973 and 1977, and one Copa Libertadores in 1976, scoring in two matches of the finals against River Plate. While at the club, he was also selected for the Bola de Prata (Campeonato Brasileiro team of the year) three times, in 1975, 1979 and 1980. In total, he had 411 appearances with Cruzeiro, and scored 105 goals. Nelinho managed Cruzeiro in 1994.

After a brief spell at Grêmio, where he won a Campeonato Gaúcho, Nelinho returned to Belo Horizonte to play for Cruzeiro's rivals Atlético Mineiro in 1982. He spent the rest of his career at the club, where he won four more Campeonato Mineiros and was awarded with the Bola de Prata once more in 1983. He also coached the club in 1993.

== International career ==
Nelinho was capped 21 times by Brazil, between April 1974 and June 1980, and scored six international goals. He won a Taça do Atlântico with the Seleção, and was part of the squad in two Copa Américas.

Nelinho played three matches in the 1974 FIFA World Cup and four in the 1978 FIFA World Cup, and scored one of the most stunning goals in World Cup history, in the third place match against Italy in 1978: from the right side of the pitch, he struck the ball into the far corner of the goal with the outside of his right foot, bending it around the sprawling Dino Zoff.

== Later life ==
After retiring from football, Nelinho joined Brazil's Democratic Labour Party and was elected State Deputy of Minas Gerais in 1987. After a period of involvement with politics, he returned briefly to football and managed Atlético Mineiro in 1993 and Cruzeiro in 1994. In 2005, Nelinho worked as pundit for TV Globo and SporTV, and currently owns a health club in Belo Horizonte.

== Honours ==
Cruzeiro

- Campeonato Mineiro: 1973, 1974, 1975, 1977
- Copa Libertadores: 1976

Grêmio

- Campeonato Gaúcho: 1980

Atlético Mineiro

- Campeonato Mineiro: 1982, 1983, 1985, 1986

Brazil

- Taça do Atlântico: 1976

Individual

- Bola de Prata: 1975, 1979, 1980, 1983
