= Joãozinho (footballer, born 1954) =

Brazilian footballer (born 1954)

Personal information
- Full name: João Soares Almeida Filho
- Date of birth: 15 February 1954 (age 72)
- Place of birth: Belo Horizonte, Brazil
- Position: Forward

Senior career*
Years	Team	Apps	(Gls)
1973–1985	Cruzeiro	154	(31)
1985	Palmeiras		
1986	Atlético Paranaense	20	(1)
1987	Coritiba		

International career
1975–1979	Brazil	4	(0)
- * Club domestic league appearances and goals

João Soares Almeida Filho (born 15 February 1954) is a Brazilian retired footballer. He had the same given name with his father, thus had a suffix Filho (means son) in his name.
