= 1976 Copa Libertadores =

17th season of Copa Libertadores

1976 Copa Libertadores de América
Tournament details
- Dates: February 25 – July 30
- Teams: 21 (from 10 associations)

Final positions
- Champions: (Brazil) Cruzeiro (1st title)
- Runners-up: (Argentina) River Plate

Tournament statistics
- Matches played: 76
- Goals scored: 208 (2.74 per match)

The Copa Libertadores 1976 was the 17th edition of the Copa Libertadores, CONMEBOL's annual international club tournament. The tournament began on February 23 and ended on July 30.

Cruzeiro won the competition, being the first Brazilian team, after Pelé's Santos, to win the continental competition. During the tournament, Cruzeiro suffered a great setback: the loss of the player Roberto Batata, who died in a car crash.

This tournament is also known for having the fastest goal ever scored in any edition of the Copa Libertadores tournament with Alianza Lima forward Félix Suárez Becerra scoring the first of three goals against Independiente Santa Fe in only six seconds.

Independiente, the defending champions who had won four consecutive titles till the 1975 edition of the tournament, were defeated in the semifinals by fellow Argentina club River Plate.

== Qualified teams ==
Country	Team	Qualification method
Argentina; 2 + 1 berths	Independiente	1975 Copa Libertadores champion
Argentina; 2 + 1 berths	River Plate	1975 Metropolitano champion 1975 Nacional champion
Argentina; 2 + 1 berths	Estudiantes	1975 Metropolitano runner-up
Bolivia; 2 berths	Guabirá	1975 Copa Simón Bolívar champion
Bolivia; 2 berths	Bolívar	1975 Copa Simón Bolívar runner-up
Brazil; 2 berths	Internacional	1975 Campeonato Brasileiro Série A champion
Brazil; 2 berths	Cruzeiro	1975 Campeonato Brasileiro Série A runner-up
Chile; 2 berths	Unión Española	1975 Primera División champion
Chile; 2 berths	Palestino	1975 Miniliga Pré-Libertadores champion
Colombia; 2 berths	Santa Fe	1975 Campeonato Profesional champion
Colombia; 2 berths	Millonarios	1975 Campeonato Profesional runner-up
Ecuador; 2 berths	LDU Quito	1975 Serie A champion
Ecuador; 2 berths	Deportivo Cuenca	1975 Serie A runner-up
Paraguay; 2 berths	Olimpia	1975 Primera División champion
Paraguay; 2 berths	Sportivo Luqueño	1975 Primera División runner-up
Peru; 2 berths	Alianza Lima	1975 Descentralizado champion
Peru; 2 berths	Alfonso Ugarte	1975 Descentralizado runner-up
Uruguay; 2 berths	Peñarol	1975 Primera División champion
Uruguay; 2 berths	Nacional	1975 Primera División runner-up
Venezuela; 2 berths	Portuguesa	1975 Venezuelan champion
Venezuela; 2 berths	Deportivo Galicia	1975 Venezuelan Championship runner-up

== Draw ==
The champions and runners-up of each football association were drawn into the same group along with another football association's participating teams. Three clubs from Argentina competed as Independiente was champion of the 1975 Copa Libertadores. They entered the tournament in the Semifinals.

Group 1	Group 2	Group 3	Group 4	Group 5
Argentina; Venezuela	Bolivia; Ecuador	Brazil; Paraguay	Colombia; Peru	Chile; Uruguay

== Group stage ==
=== Group 1 ===
Pos	Team	Pld	W	D	L	GF	GA	GD	Pts	Qualification	(Argentina) RIV	(Argentina) EST	(Venezuela) POR	(Venezuela) DGA
1	(Argentina) River Plate	6	5	0	1	10	3	+7	10	Qualified to Semi-Finals	—	1–0	2–1	4–1
2	(Argentina) Estudiantes	6	4	1	1	11	3	+8	9		1–0	—	3–0	4–0
3	(Venezuela) Portuguesa	6	2	1	3	8	11	−3	5		0–2	2–2	—	3–1
4	(Venezuela) Deportivo Galicia	6	0	0	6	3	15	−12	0		0–1	0–1	1–2	—

=== Group 2 ===
Group 2 standings
Pos	Team	Pld	W	D	L	GF	GA	GD	Pts	Qualification	(Ecuador) LDQ	(Ecuador) CDC	(Bolivia) BOL	(Bolivia) GUA
1	(Ecuador) LDU Quito	6	3	2	1	10	5	+5	8	Qualified to the 1st Place Playoff	—	1–1	2–1	4–0
2	(Ecuador) Deportivo Cuenca	6	3	2	1	9	6	+3	8	Qualified to the 1st Place Playoff	0–0	—	3–1	1–0
3	(Bolivia) Bolívar	6	3	0	3	16	11	+5	6		3–2	4–2	—	7–1
4	(Bolivia) Guabirá	6	1	0	5	2	15	−13	2		0–1	0–2	1–0	—

=== Group 3 ===
Pos	Team	Pld	W	D	L	GF	GA	GD	Pts	Qualification	(Brazil) CRU	(Brazil) INT	(Paraguay) OLI	(Paraguay) SLU
1	(Brazil) Cruzeiro	6	5	1	0	20	9	+11	11	Qualified to Semi-Finals	—	5–4	4–1	4–1
2	(Brazil) Internacional	6	3	1	2	10	8	+2	7		0–2	—	1–0	3–0
3	(Paraguay) Olimpia	6	1	2	3	7	11	−4	4		2–2	1–1	—	2–3
4	(Paraguay) Sportivo Luqueño	6	1	0	5	5	14	−9	2		1–3	0–1	0–1	—

=== Group 4 ===
Pos	Team	Pld	W	D	L	GF	GA	GD	Pts	Qualification	(Peru) ALI	(Colombia) MIL	(Peru) AUG	(Colombia) ISF
1	(Peru) Alianza Lima	6	3	2	1	8	4	+4	8	Qualified to Semi-Finals	—	2–1	0–0	3–0
2	(Colombia) Millonarios	6	2	2	2	8	5	+3	6		1–0	—	4–0	1–1
3	(Peru) Alfonso Ugarte	6	1	4	1	5	8	−3	6		0–0	1–1	—	2–1
4	(Colombia) Santa Fe	6	1	2	3	7	11	−4	4		2–3	1–0	2–2	—

=== Group 5 ===
Pos	Team	Pld	W	D	L	GF	GA	GD	Pts	Qualification	(Uruguay) PEÑ	(Chile) UES	(Chile) PAL	(Uruguay) NAC
1	(Uruguay) Peñarol	6	3	2	1	7	4	+3	8	Qualified to Semi-Finals	—	2–0	2–1	1–1
2	(Chile) Unión Española	6	3	2	1	5	3	+2	8		0–0	—	1–0	2–0
3	(Chile) Palestino	6	2	1	3	5	6	−1	5		1–0	0–1	—	2–1
4	(Uruguay) Nacional	6	0	3	3	5	9	−4	3		1–2	1–1	1–1	—

== 1st Place Playoff ==
Playoff standings
Pos	Team	Pld	W	D	L	GF	GA	GD	Pts	Qualification
1	(Ecuador) LDU Quito	1	1	0	0	2	1	+1	2	Qualified to the Semi-Finals
2	(Ecuador) Deportivo Cuenca	1	0	0	1	1	2	−1	0	

April 22 First Stage	LDU Quito (Ecuador)	2–1 (a.e.t.)	(Ecuador) Deportivo Cuenca	Guayaquil, Ecuador
	Carrera 66'; Rivadeneira 115'	Report	Villagra 63'	Stadium: Estadio Modelo Alberto Spencer Herrera; Attendance: 50,000; Referee: Óscar Veiro (Argentina)

== Semi-finals ==
=== Group 1 ===
Group 1 standings
Pos	Team	Pld	W	D	L	GF	GA	GD	Pts	Qualification	(Brazil) CRU	(Ecuador) LDQ	(Peru) ALI
1	(Brazil) Cruzeiro	4	4	0	0	18	3	+15	8	Qualified to the Final	—	4–1	7–1
2	(Ecuador) LDU Quito	4	1	0	3	4	10	−6	2		1–3	—	2–1
3	(Peru) Alianza Lima	4	1	0	3	4	13	−9	2		0–4	2–0	—

=== Group 2 ===
Pos	Team	Pld	W	D	L	GF	GA	GD	Pts	Qualification	(Argentina) RIV	(Argentina) IND	(Uruguay) PEÑ
1	(Argentina) River Plate	4	2	1	1	4	1	+3	5	Qualified to the Final	—	0–0	3–0
2	(Argentina) Independiente	4	2	1	1	2	1	+1	5		0–1	—	1–0
3	(Uruguay) Peñarol	4	1	0	3	1	5	−4	2		1–0	0–1	—

==== Playoffs ====
Team 1	Score	Team 2
River Plate (Argentina)	1–0	(Argentina) Independiente

== Finals ==
July 21, 1976

Cruzeiro (Brazil)	4–1	River Plate (Argentina)
Nelinho 22'; Palhinha 29', 40'; Valdo 80'		Más 63'

Mineirão, Belo Horizonte
Attendance: 58,720 (65,000)
Referee: Vicente Llobregat, Venezuela

July 28, 1976

River Plate (Argentina)	2–1	Cruzeiro (Brazil)
J. J. López 10'; P. González 76'		Palhinha 48'

Monumental de Nuñez, Buenos Aires
Attendance: 90,000
Referee: José Martínez Bazán, Uruguay

July 30, 1976

Cruzeiro (Brazil)	3–2	River Plate (Argentina)
Nelinho 24'; Eduardo 55'; Joãozinho 88'		Más 59'; Urquiza 64'

Nacional, Santiago
Attendance: 40,000
Referee: Alberto Martínez, Chile

== Champions ==
1976 Copa Libertadores champions
(Brazil)
Cruzeiro
First title
