= 1975 Argentine Primera División =

84th season of top-tier football league in Argentina

Primera División
- Season: 1975
- Champions: River Plate (Metropolitano and Nacional)

The 1975 Primera División season was the 84th season of top-flight football in Argentina. River Plate won both tournaments. None of the teams were relegated.

== Metropolitano Championship ==
Metropolitano
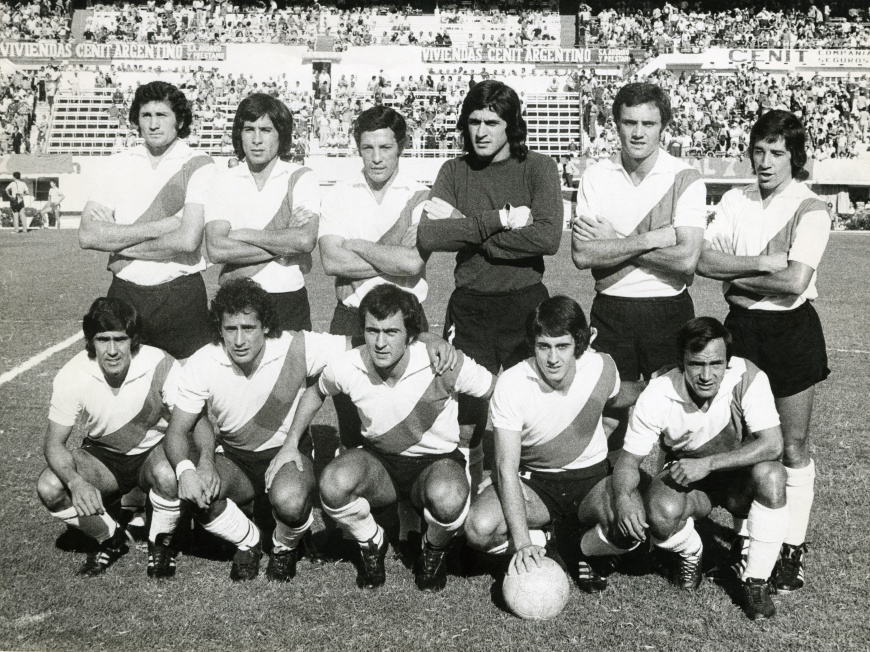
- River Plate, Metropolitano champions
- Season: 1975
- Champions: River Plate (14th title)
- Promoted: Temperley; Unión (SF)
- Relegated: (none)
- 1976 Copa Libertadores: River Plate
- Top goalscorer: (Argentina) Héctor Scotta (32 goals)

Pos	Team	Pld	W	D	L	GF	GA	GD	Pts
1	River Plate	38	23	9	6	72	38	+34	55
2	Huracán	38	21	9	8	73	46	+27	51
3	Boca Juniors	38	22	6	10	80	40	+40	50
4	Unión	38	20	9	9	65	42	+23	49
5	Estudiantes (LP)	38	18	11	9	68	51	+17	47
5	Colón	38	16	15	7	60	48	+12	47
7	Rosario Central	38	15	11	12	75	51	+24	41
8	Ferro Carril Oeste	38	14	12	12	61	58	+3	40
9	Vélez Sársfield	38	13	13	12	50	47	+3	39
10	Newell's Old Boys	38	11	16	11	47	43	+4	38
11	San Lorenzo	38	11	12	15	56	63	−7	34
11	Gimnasia y Esgrima (LP)	38	11	12	15	55	71	−16	34
13	Independiente	38	12	9	17	49	55	−6	33
13	Atlanta	38	13	7	18	62	69	−7	33
15	Chacarita Juniors	38	11	10	17	47	72	−25	32
16	Racing	38	7	17	14	60	91	−31	31
17	Banfield	38	7	14	17	57	73	−16	28
17	All Boys	38	9	10	19	43	65	−22	28
19	Argentinos Juniors	38	8	9	21	46	70	−24	25
20	Temperley	38	7	11	20	44	77	−33	25

== Nacional Championship ==
Nacional
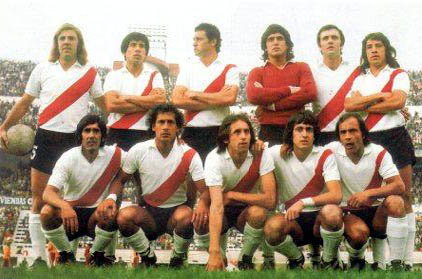
- River Plate, Nacional champions
- Season: 1975
- Champions: River Plate (15th title)
- 1976 Copa Libertadores: Estudiantes LP
- Top goalscorer: (Argentina) Héctor Scotta (28 goals)

=== Group A ===
Pos	Team	Pld	W	D	L	GF	GA	GD	Pts
1	River Plate	16	12	1	3	41	17	+24	25
2	Estudiantes (LP)	16	7	7	2	24	18	+6	21
3	Huracán	16	9	1	6	31	21	+10	19
3	Gimnasia y Esgrima (M)	16	7	5	4	22	16	+6	19
5	All Boys	16	5	3	8	22	34	−12	13
6	San Martín (T)	16	4	4	8	23	31	−8	12
7	Vélez Sársfield	16	3	4	9	20	30	−10	10
8	Cipolletti	16	2	4	10	19	32	−13	8

=== Group B ===
Pos	Team	Pld	W	D	L	GF	GA	GD	Pts
1	Atético Tucumán	16	10	3	3	29	22	+7	23
2	San Lorenzo	16	10	2	4	34	22	+12	22
3	Argentinos Juniors	16	9	2	5	35	35	0	20
4	Boca Juniors	16	8	0	8	39	31	+8	16
5	Aldosivi	16	6	2	8	23	29	−6	14
6	Juventud Alianza	16	6	0	10	24	39	−15	12
7	Gimnasia y Esgrima (LP)	16	4	3	9	27	31	−4	11
7	Ferro Carril Oeste	16	4	3	9	21	26	−5	11

=== Group C ===
Pos	Team	Pld	W	D	L	GF	GA	GD	Pts
1	Rosario Central	16	10	5	1	21	8	+13	25
2	Gimnasia y Esgrima (J)	16	8	5	3	20	12	+8	21
3	Independiente	16	6	7	3	30	20	+10	19
4	Belgrano	16	7	3	6	26	23	+3	17
5	Unión	16	5	6	5	23	19	+4	16
6	Chacarita Juniors	16	3	4	9	16	33	−17	10
7	Jorge Newbery	16	3	3	10	14	24	−10	9
8	Banfield	16	3	3	10	20	30	−10	9

=== Group D ===
Pos	Team	Pld	W	D	L	GF	GA	GD	Pts
1	Talleres (C)	16	9	4	3	38	23	+15	22
1	Temperley	16	9	4	3	31	21	+10	22
3	Newell's Old Boys	16	9	3	4	31	15	+16	21
3	Colón	16	9	3	4	34	27	+7	21
5	Racing	16	7	3	6	36	30	+6	17
6	Atlanta	16	7	1	8	29	35	−6	15
7	Juventud Antoniana	16	2	7	7	17	24	−7	11
8	Bartolomé Mitre	16	0	1	15	10	52	−42	1

=== Final Tournament ===
Pos	Team	Pld	W	D	L	GF	GA	GD	Pts
1	River Plate	7	5	2	0	13	8	+5	12
2	Estudiantes (LP)	7	5	1	1	8	2	+6	11
3	San Lorenzo	7	3	3	1	18	11	+7	9
4	Gimnasia y Esgrima (J)	7	2	2	3	10	13	−3	6
5	Rosario Central	7	1	3	3	8	9	−1	5
5	Talleres (C)	7	1	3	3	9	11	−2	5
5	Atlético Tucumán	7	1	3	3	7	13	−6	5
8	Temperley	7	1	1	5	9	15	−6	3
