= Alcides Lemos =

Brazilian footballer (1913–1974)

Alcides
Personal information
- Full name: Alcides Lemos
- Date of birth: 5 October 1913
- Place of birth: Niterói, Brazil
- Date of death: 4 October 1974 (aged 60)
- Place of death: Belo Horizonte, Brazil
- Position: Forward

Senior career*
Years	Team	Apps	(Gls)
1931–1936	Palestra Itália-MG		
1936–1937	América-MG		
1938–1953	Cruzeiro		
- * Club domestic league appearances and goals as of 9 March 2024

Alcides Lemos (5 October 1913 – 4 October 1974), was a Brazilian professional footballer who played as a forward.

== Career ==
Eighth top scorer in the history of Cruzeiro EC with 140 goals, Alcides Lemos was the main scorer in the 1940s, being the successor of other great strikers of the club such as Ninão and Bengala. He won the Minas Gerais championship on four occasions. Lemos was inducted into the Cruzeiro EC Hall of Fame in 2012.

== Honours ==
Cruzeiro

- Campeonato Mineiro: 1940, 1943, 1944, 1945

Individual

- 1943 Campeonato Mineiro top scorer: 9 goals
