= 1968 in Brazilian football =

Football in Brazil
- Season: 1968

The following article presents a summary of the 1968 football (soccer) season in Brazil, which was the 67th season of competitive football in the country.

== Taça Brasil ==
Semifinals

Team #1	Agg	Team #2	1st leg	2nd leg	3rd leg
Cruzeiro	1–2	Botafogo	0–1	1–1	-
Fortaleza	1–2	Náutico	2–1	1–2	2–1

Final

September 3, 1968

Fortaleza	2–2	Botafogo

October 4, 1968

Botafogo	4–0	Fortaleza

Botafogo declared as the Taça Brasil champions by aggregate score of 6–2.

== Torneio Roberto Gomes Pedrosa ==
Final Stage

Position	Team	Points	Played	Won	Drawn	Lost	For	Against	Difference
1	Santos	6	3	3	0	0	7	2	5
2	Internacional	2	3	1	0	2	6	5	1
3	Vasco da Gama	3	3	1	0	2	4	7	-3
4	Palmeiras	1	3	1	0	2	3	6	-3

Santos declared as the Torneio Roberto Gomes Pedrosa champions.

== State championship champions ==
State	Champion	State	Champion
Acre	Atlético Acreano	Pará	Remo
Alagoas	CSA	Paraíba	Botafogo-PB
Amapá	Santana	Paraná	Coritiba
Amazonas	Nacional	Pernambuco	Náutico
Bahia	Galícia	Piauí	Piauí
Ceará	Ferroviário-CE	Rio de Janeiro	Americano
Distrito Federal	Defelê	Rio Grande do Norte	Alecrim
Espírito Santo	Rio Branco-ES	Rio Grande do Sul	Grêmio
Goiás	Goiânia	Rondônia	Moto Clube
Guanabara	Botafogo	Roraima	-
Maranhão	Moto Club	Santa Catarina	Comerciário
Mato Grosso	Operário (VG)	São Paulo	Santos
Mato Grosso do Sul	-	Sergipe	Confiança
Minas Gerais	Cruzeiro	Tocantins	-

== Other competition champions ==
Competition	Champion
Copa Norte-Nordeste	Sport Recife
Torneio dos Campeões da CBD	Grêmio Maringá

== Brazilian clubs in international competitions ==
Team	Copa Libertadores 1968
Náutico	Group stage
Palmeiras	Runner-up

== Brazil national team ==
The following table lists all the games played by the Brazil national football team in official competitions and friendly matches during 1968.

Date	Opposition	Result	Score	Brazil scorers	Competition
June 9, 1968	Uruguay	W	2–0	Tostão, Sadi	Taça Rio Branco
June 12, 1968	Uruguay	W	4–0	Paulo Borges, Tostão, Jairzinho, Gérson	Taça Rio Branco
June 16, 1968	West Germany	L	1–2	Tostão	International Friendly
June 20, 1968	Poland	W	6–3	Rivellino (2), Jairzinho (2), Tostão, Natal	International Friendly
June 23, 1968	Czechoslovakia	L	2–3	Natal, Carlos Alberto Torres	International Friendly
June 25, 1968	Yugoslavia	W	2–0	Carlos Alberto Torres, Tostão	International Friendly
June 30, 1968	Portugal	W	2–0	Rivellino, Tostão	International Friendly
July 7, 1968	Mexico	W	2–0	Jairzinho (2)	International Friendly
July 10, 1968	Mexico	L	1–2	Rivellino	International Friendly
July 14, 1968	Peru	W	4–3	Natal, Jairzinho, Roberto Miranda, Carlos Alberto Torres	International Friendly
July 17, 1968	Peru	W	4–0	Rivellino, Gérson, Tostão, Jairzinho	International Friendly
July 25, 1968	Paraguay	W	4–0	Pelé (2), Toninho Guerreiro, Eduardo	Taça Oswaldo Cruz
July 28, 1968	Paraguay	L	0–1	-	Taça Oswaldo Cruz
October 31, 1968	Mexico	L	1–2	Carlos Alberto Torres	International Friendly
November 3, 1968	Mexico	W	2–1	Pelé, Jairzinho	International Friendly
November 6, 1968	FIFA XI	W	2–1	Rivellino, Tostão	International Friendly (unofficial match)
November 13, 1968	(Brazil) Coritiba	W	2–1	Dirceu Lopes, Zé Carlos	International Friendly (unofficial match)
December 14, 1968	West Germany	D	2–2	Eduardo (2)	International Friendly
December 17, 1968	Yugoslavia	D	3–3	Carlos Alberto Torres, Pelé, Babá	International Friendly
December 19, 1968	Yugoslavia	W	3–2	Vaguinho, Amauri, Ronaldo	International Friendly
