= List of Cruzeiro EC players =

This is a list of Cruzeiro players both past and present. Clubs are as of 8 March 2009.

Contents:	Top – A B C D E F G H I J K L M N O P Q R S T U V W X Y Z

== A ==
- Alex Mineiro
- Alex Alves
- Alex – Currently at (Brazil) Coritiba F.C
- Aldo – Currently at (Brazil) Grêmio reserves
- Andre Doring
- André Luis – Currently playing at (Brazil) Fluminense
- Araújo – Currently playing at (Brazil) Fluminense
- (Colombia) Víctor Aristizábal

== B ==
- Belletti – Currently at (Brazil) Fluminense F.C.
- Brito

== C ==
- Carlinhos Bala – Currently at (Brazil) Fortaleza
- Cris – Currently at (Turkey) Galatasaray

== D ==
- Deivid – Currently at (Brazil) Clube de Regatas do Flamengo
- Dida
- Diogo
- Dirceu Lopes
- Diego – Currently at (Brazil) Gremio
- Dudu – Currently at (Brazil) Cruzeiro

== E ==
- Edilson
- Edu Dracena – Currently at (Brazil) Santos FC
- Edu Lima
- Élber
- Eliezio
- Élson – Currently at (Russia) FC Rostov

== F ==
- Fábio – Currently at (Brazil) Cruzeiro
- Fábio Pinto – Currently at (Brazil) America Mineiro
- Fábio Santos
- Fred – Currently at (Brazil) Fluminense
- (Colombia) Freddy Rincón
- Felipe Gomes

== G ==
- Gabriel – Currently at (Brazil) Gremio
- Guilherme Milhomem Gusmão – Currently at (Brazil) Atletico Mineiro
- Gilberto – Currently at (Brazil) Cruzeiro
- Geovanni – Currently at (Brazil) Vitoria
- (Ecuador) Giovanny Espinoza -Currently at (Chile) Unión Española
- Gladstone – Currently at (Romania) Vaslui
- Gomes – Currently at (England) Watford F.C
- Gabriel – Currently at (Italy) AC Milan

== H ==
- (Spain) Heraldo Becerra Nuñez

== I ==
- Igor Thiago – Currently at (England) Brentford F.C

== J ==
- Jairzinho
- Joãozinho
- Jonathan – Currently at (Italy) Internazionale
- Jonathas – Currently at (Italy) Brescia
- Jonilson – Currently at (Brazil) Goiás on loan from (Brazil) Botafogo
- Júlio César – Currently at (Brazil) Fluminense
- (Argentina) Juan Pablo Sorín

== K ==
- Kerlon – Currently at (Brazil) Nacional (NS) on loan from (Italy) Internazionale

== L ==
- Lauro – Currently at (Brazil) Internacional
- Leandro – Currently at (Brazil) Atlético Mineiro on loan from (Portugal) F.C. Porto
- Leandro Bonfim – Currently at (Brazil) Desportivo Brasil
- Léo Silva – Currently at (Brazil) Americana Futebol
- Luisão – Currently at (Portugal) S.L. Benfica
- Luizão – Currently at (Uzbekistan) FC Bunyodkor
- Lucas Silva Borges – Currently at (Spain) Real Madrid

== M ==
- (Chile) Cláudio Maldonado – Currently at (Brazil) Corinthians
- Martinez – Currently at (Japan) Cerezo Osaka
- (Bolivia) Marcelo Martins – Currently at (Ukraine) Shakhtar Donetsk
- Maxwell – Currently at (France) PSG
- Michel
- Müller

== N ==
- Nelinho
- Niginho

== P ==
- (Argentina) Perfumo
- (Uruguay) Pablo Forlán
- Palhinha(1970s player)
- Palhinha (1990s player)

== R ==
- Raul
- (Uruguay) Revétria
- Rivaldo – Currently at (Brazil) São Paulo FC
- Roberto Batata
- (Peru) Roberto Palacios – Currently at (Peru) Sporting Cristal
- (Brazil) Rodrigão
- Ronaldo
- (Brazil) Ramires – Currently at (China) Jiangsu Suning

== S ==
- Sandro – Currently at (Brazil) Americana Futebol
- Sergio Manoel – Currently at (Brazil) Bragantino
- Shamir Patel

== T ==
- (Chile) Tapia
- Teco – Currently at (Brazil) Brasiliense
- Thiago Heleno – Currently at (Brazil) Palmeiras
- Toninho Almeida
- Toninho Cerezo
- Tostão

== U ==
- (Ecuador) Ulises de la Cruz – Currently at (Ecuador) LDU Quito

== V ==
- (Colombia) Alexander Viveros – Currently at (Argentina) Talleres de Córdoba
- (Paraguay) Victor Quintana

== W ==
- Wagner – Currently at (Brazil) Fluminense
- Walax
- Wilson Piazza
- Wilson Gottardo

== Z ==
- Zé Eduardo
