= Anfilogino Guarisi =

Italian-Brazililan footballer (1905–1974)

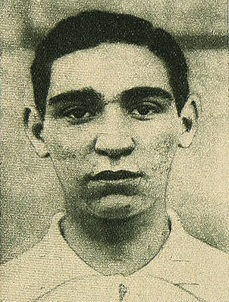
- Filó in 1926

Personal information
- Full name: Amphilóquio Guarisi Marques
- Date of birth: 6 December 1905
- Place of birth: São Paulo, Brazil
- Date of death: 8 June 1974 (aged 68)
- Place of death: São Paulo, Brazil
- Position: Forward

Senior career*
Years	Team	Apps	(Gls)
1922–1924	Portuguesa	50	(21)
1925–1928	Paulistano	?	(?)
1929–1931	Corinthians	50	(21)
1931–1936	Lazio	134	(43)
1937–1939	Corinthians	24	(8)
1939–1940	Portuguesa Santista	?	(?)
1940	Palestra Itália	5	(1)

International career
1925	Brazil	4	(1)
1932–1934	Italy	6	(1)
Medal record
Brazil and Italy
Copa América
Silver medal – second place	1925 Argentina
Central European International Cup
Silver medal – second place	1931–32 Central European International Cup
FIFA World Cup
Gold medal – first place	1934 Italy
Central European International Cup
Gold medal – first place	1933–35 Central European International Cup
- * Club domestic league appearances and goals

Amphilóquio Guarisi Marques (26 December 1905 – 8 June 1974) was an Italian Brazilian footballer who played as a forward. In Brazil he was known as Filó (IPA: [fiˈlɔ]) and in Italy as Anfilogino Guarisi (IPA: [aɱfiˈlɔːdʒino ɡwaˈriːzi]). Throughout his career he played football in both Brazil and Italy, representing both nations at the international level, and was a member of the Italian team that won the 1934 FIFA World Cup.

== Career ==
Born in São Paulo, in 1922 Guarisi started his career in Portuguesa, where his father, Manuel Augusto Marques, was the president.

In 1925, he transferred to Paulistano, where he played alongside the legendary figure of Arthur Friedenreich. In the same year, in a friendly match against France on Europe, he scored one of the goals, and Paulistano won over France, 7 to 2.

On 6 December 1925, he made his first appearance for Brazil, against Paraguay. Brazil won, 5–2, and Filó scored one of the goals. He was a member of the Brazil team that finished in second place in the 1925 South American Championship.

With Paulistano, he won the Campeonato Paulista of 1926 (when he was the top scorer, with 16 goals), 1927 and 1929, for the Amateur League of Football. In 1929, he was also champion for Corinthians, for the Paulista Athletic Sports Association (in those years, there were two football leagues in São Paulo). In 1930, he won another Campeonato Paulista for Corinthians.

He waited to go to the 1930 FIFA World Cup in Uruguay, but a serious misunderstanding between the football leagues of Rio de Janeiro and São Paulo made that only players from Rio went to the tournament. Filó, Friedenreich and other football players from São Paulo did not go to Uruguay. The only one player from São Paulo who obtained his passage to the World Cup was Araken, who was in litigation with his club, Santos.

In 1931, Filó transferred to Lazio. In Italy, he would be known by his surname, Guarisi. In the biancoceleste, he played along with other Italian-Brazilians, the Fantoni family: Ninão, Nininho and Niginho, also known there by their surnames, like a dynasty: Fantoni I, Fantoni II and Fantoni III. That squad of Lazio was known as "Brasilazio".

In 1932, Guarisi, as son of an Italian mother, had right of Italian citizenship and was selected for the silver winning 1931–32 Central European International Cup and later the gold winning 1933–35 Central European International Cup campaign, and also the 1934 World Cup squad, in the process becoming the first Brazilian-born player to win the World Cup. In the only qualification game that Italy had played (against Greece), Guarisi scored the first goal of Azzurra in a World Cup qualification game. In that match, he played with his colleague of Lazio, Fantoni II.

He came back to Corinthians and won the Campeonato Paulista of 1937. His last Paulista title was for the rivals of Palestra Itália (current Palmeiras), the football team of the Italian colony of São Paulo.

== Honours ==
=== International ===
Italy

- FIFA World Cup: 1934
- Central European International Cup: 1933–35; Runner-up: 1931–32
