= Almirante Participações e Empreendimentos =

Brazilian holding company

- Type: Private
- Industry: Sports investment
- Founded: April 9, 2024; 2 years ago
- Headquarters: São Paulo, Brazil
- Key people: Mário Junqueira (chairman)
- Owner: Marcos Lamacchia (99%); Mário Junqueira (1%)
- Subsidiaries: Vasco da Gama (90%)

Almirante Participações e Empreendimentos S.A. is a Brazilian closed joint-stoke company, incorporated in April 2024, based in São Paulo, whose registered economic activity is related to the management of sports facilities and participation in other companies. The company became publicly known in 2026 for representing the business interests of businessman Marcos Lamacchia in the negotiations for the acquisition of a controlling stake in CR Vasco da Gama's Sociedade Anônima do Futebol (SAF).

== History ==
Almirante Participações e Empreendimentos S.A. was incorporated on April 9, 2024, a period in which negotiations were already underway between Marcos Faria Lamacchia and CR Vasco da Gama representatives for a possible change in the control of SAF. Although the company was created before its public exhibition, there is little information available about its commercial activities prior to its participation in negotiations with the club. The company began to receive greater public attention in July 2026, when Marcos Lamacchia signed, on his behalf, a letter of intent related to the acquisition of Vasco SAF shares. The document was also signed by Mário Junqueira Franco Júnior.

On July 15, 2026, the court of Justice of Rio de Janeiro published the notice for the judicial disposal of 90% of SAF's actions. Almirante S.A. appeared in the process as stalking horse bidder, that is, the investor who presents the initial reference proposal in a competitive process and receives certain protections if higher proposals arise. On September 10, 2026, the 4th Business Court of Rio de Janeiro authorized Vasco SAF to obtain up to R$150 million in DIP financing from Almirante S.A. The funds were to be released according to the SAF’s actual liquidity needs, subject to monitoring and oversight of its cash flow.
