= 1966 Campeonato Brasileiro Série A =

Campeonato Brasileiro Série A
- Season: 1966
- Champions: Cruzeiro (1st title)
- Copa Libertadores de América: Cruzeiro; Santos
- Matches: 47
- Goals: 149 (3.17 per match)
- Top goalscorer: Bita; Toninho Guerreiro (10 goals)

The 1966 Campeonato Brasileiro Série A (officially the 1966 Taça Brasil) was the 9th edition of the Campeonato Brasileiro Série A.

== Northern Zone ==
=== Northern Group ===
Teams			Scores		Tie-breaker	
Team 1	Points	Team 2	1st leg	2nd leg	3rd leg	GD
Northern Group First Stage
Paysandu (Pará)	4:0	(Amazonas (Brazilian state)) Rio Negro	6:0	3:0	–	—
Flamengo (Piauí)	3:1	(Maranhão) Sampaio Corrêa	2:0	1:1	–	–
Northern Group Semifinal
Paysandu (Pará)	2:2	(Piauí) Flamengo	2:0	0:2	0:0	—
Northern Final
Fortaleza (Ceará)	3:1	(Pará) Paysandu	3:1	1:1	—	—

=== Northeastern Group ===
Teams			Scores		Tie-breaker	
Team 1	Points	Team 2	1st leg	2nd leg	3rd leg	GD
Northeastern Group First Stage
Campinense (Paraíba)	4:0	(Rio Grande do Norte) ABC	2:0	1:2	–	—
CSA (Alagoas)	4:0	(Sergipe) Confiança	2:0	1:0	–	—
Northeastern Group Semifinals
Campinense (Paraíba)	0:4	(Alagoas) CSA	2:3	0:2	–	—
Northeastern Group Finals
CSA (Alagoas)	0:4	(Bahia) Vitória	2:3	2:4	–	—

=== Northern Zone Decision ===
Teams			Scores		Tie-breaker	
Team 1	Points	Team 2	1st leg	2nd leg	3rd leg	GD
Northern Zone Semifinals
Fortaleza (Ceará)	1:3	(Bahia) Vitória	1:1	0:4	–	—
Northern Zone Finals
Náutico (Pernambuco)	4:0	(Bahia) Vitória	3:0	3:2	–	—

== Southern Zone ==
Teams			Scores		Tie-breaker	
Team 1	Points	Team 2	1st leg	2nd leg	3rd leg	GD
Southern Group First Stage
Inter de Lages (Santa Catarina (state))	1:3	(Paraná (state)) Ferroviário	3:3	0:2	–	—
Southern Group Finals
Ferroviário (Paraná (state))	1:3	(Rio Grande do Sul) Grêmio	0:0	0:3	—	—

=== Central Group ===
Teams			Scores		Tie-breaker	
Team 1	Points	Team 2	1st leg	2nd leg	3rd leg	GD
Quarterfinals
Rabello (Federal District (Brazil))	2:2	(Goiás) Anápolis	2:0	0:1	1:4	–
Desportiva Ferroviária (Espírito Santo)	1:3	(Rio de Janeiro (state)) Americano	2:2	0:3	–	–
Semifinals
Anápolis (Goiás)	2:2	(Rio de Janeiro (state)) Americano	2:0	1:2	2:3	–
Central Zone final
Americano (Rio de Janeiro (state))	0:4	(Minas Gerais) Cruzeiro	0:4	1:6	–	–

=== Southern Zone Finals ===
Teams			Scores		Tie-breaker	
Team 1	Points	Team 2	1st leg	2nd leg	3rd leg	GD
Grêmio (Rio Grande do Sul)	1:3	(Minas Gerais) Cruzeiro	0:0	1:2	–	—

== Quarterfinals ==
Teams			Scores		Tie-breaker	
Team 1	Points	Team 2	1st leg	2nd leg	3rd leg	GD
Palmeiras (São Paulo (state))	2:2	(Pernambuco) Náutico	0:0	0:0	0:3	—

== Semifinals ==
Santos and Fluminense enter in this stage

Teams			Scores		Tie-breaker
Team 1	Points	Team 2	1st leg	2nd leg	3rd leg
Náutico (Pernambuco)	2:2	(São Paulo (state)) Santos	0:2	5:3	1:4
Cruzeiro (Minas Gerais)	4:0	(Guanabara (state)) Fluminense	1:0	3:1	—

== Finals ==
30 November 1966

Cruzeiro	6–2	Santos FC
Ze Carlos (o.g.); Tostão; Natal; Dirceu Lopes		Toninho Guerreiro

Mineirão, Belo Horizonte
Attendance: 90,000
Referee: Armando Marques

7 December 1966

Santos FC	2–3 (4–9 agg.)	Cruzeiro
Pelé 23'; Toninho Guerreiro 25'		Tostão 64'; Natal 73'; Dirceu Lopes 89'

Pacaembu, São Paulo
Attendance: 30,000
Referee: Armando Marques
