= Pedro Lourenço =

Brazilian businessman

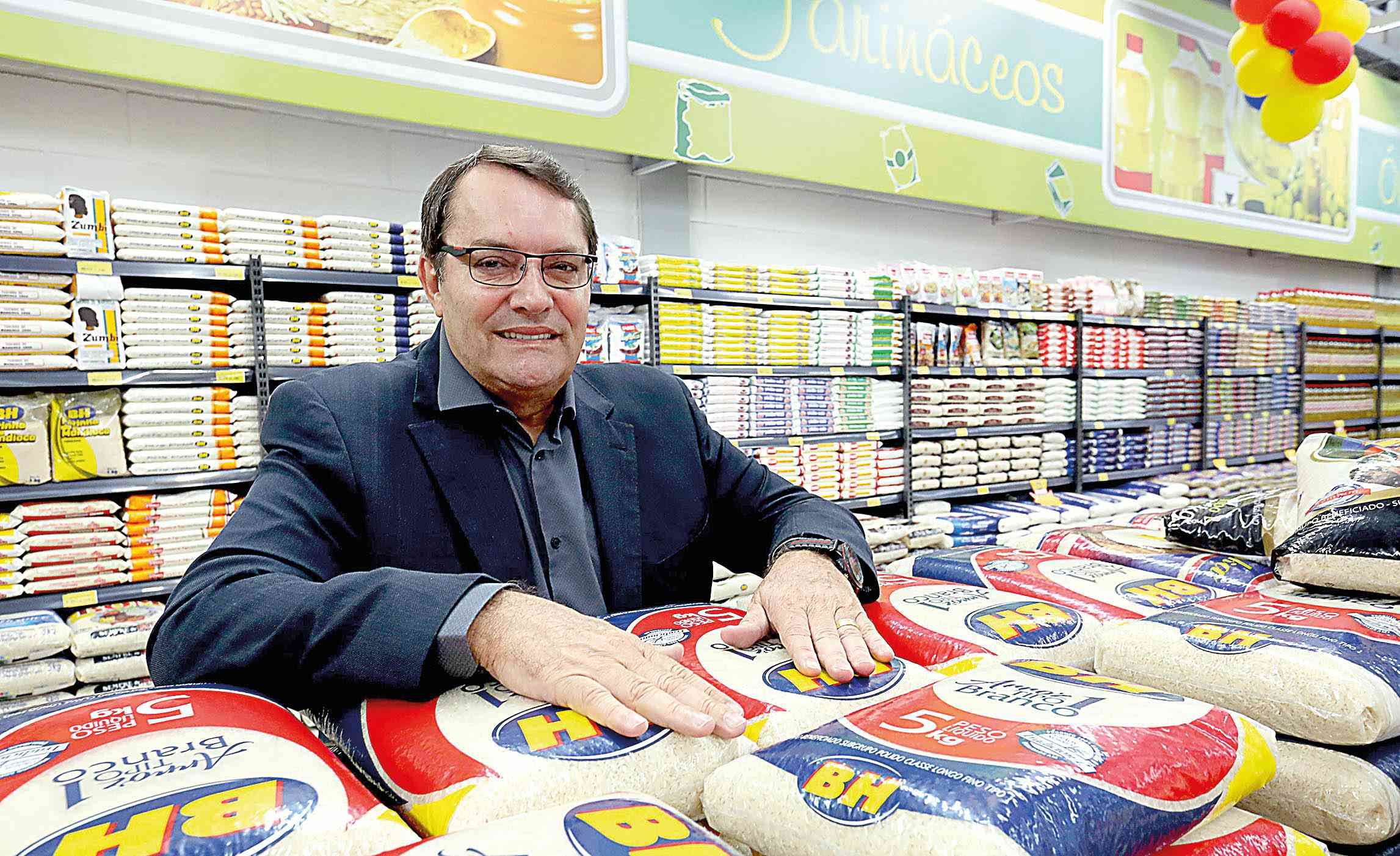
- Born: Pedro Lourenço de Oliveira; October 15, 1955 (age 70); Paineiras, Minas Gerais, Brazil
- Other names: Pedrinho; Pedrinho BH
- Occupation: Businessman
- Known for: Being the majority shareholder of Cruzeiro Esporte Clube

Pedro Lourenço de Oliveira (born October 15, 1955) is a Brazilian businessman, founder of Supermercados BH, one of the largest supermarket chains in Brazil, and owner of Cruzeiro Esporte Clube.

== Biography ==
Pedro Lourenço was born on October 15, 1955, in Paineiras, Minas Gerais, to a family of farmers. He attended school until the 8th grade and, at 18, moved to Belo Horizonte, where he began his career as a truck unloader at the now-defunct Casas da Banha supermarket chain. He rose through the company's ranks, becoming a sales supervisor for a wholesale distributor within a few years. In 1996, he decided to found Mercearia BH, which gradually grew into a supermarket chain by acquiring struggling stores and focusing on the outskirts of Belo Horizonte and small towns in the region that previously had no supermarkets. In 2025, Supermercados BH was ranked as the fourth-largest supermarket chain in Brazil in a list published by the Brazilian Supermarket Association.

A passionate fan of Cruzeiro EC, Pedro Lourenço first became involved behind the scenes at the club in 2019, around the time the team was relegated to Série B and Ronaldo took over the club's SAF (corporate entity). He began by helping cover overdue salaries and invested R$100 million in the SAF through convertible debentures. He also took part in the acquisition of several players and provided loans to Cruzeiro. His influence within the club grew steadily, ultimately leading to the sale of 90% of the club's SAF to Pedrinho in April 2024.
