= Ilton Chaves =

Brazilian footballer and manager (1937–2021)

Personal information
- Full name: Ilton de Oliveira Chaves
- Date of birth: 28 March 1937
- Place of birth: Itinga, Minas Gerais, Brazil
- Date of death: 27 May 2021 (aged 84)
- Place of death: Belo Horizonte, Minas Gerais, Brazil
- Position: Midfielder

Youth career
- América-TO
- Atlético Mineiro

Senior career*
Years	Team	Apps	(Gls)
1955–1960	Atlético Mineiro		
1961–1963	América Mineiro		
1963–1964	America-RJ		
1965–1969	Cruzeiro		

International career
1963	Brazil	4	(1)

Managerial career
- 1968–1969: Cruzeiro (interim)
- 1970: Cruzeiro
- 1970–1971: Cruzeiro
- 1971–1972: Valeriodoce
- 1972–1975: Cruzeiro
- 1975: Seleção Mineira
- 1976: Uberaba
- 1977: Ceará
- 1977: América Mineiro
- 1978: Sport Recife
- 1978–1979: Valeriodoce
- 1979: Santos
- 1979–1980: Cruzeiro
- 1981: Santa Cruz
- 1981: Náutico
- 1982: Valeriodoce
- 1983: Villa Nova
- 1983–1984: Cruzeiro
- 1984: Uberlândia
- 1984: Villa Nova
- 1985: Itabuna
- 1986–1987: Atlético Mineiro
- 1988: Valeriodoce
- 1989: Tupi
- * Club domestic league appearances and goals

Ilton de Oliveira Chaves (28 March 1937 – 27 May 2021) was a Brazilian footballer and manager. He played as a midfielder. He was part of Brazil’s squad for the 1963 South American Championship. Chaves died on 27 May 2021, at the age of 84.

== Honours ==
=== Player ===
Atlético Mineiro

- Campeonato Mineiro: 1955, 1956, 1958

Cruzeiro

- Campeonato Mineiro: 1965, 1966, 1967, 1968
- Taça Brasil: 1966

=== Manager ===
Cruzeiro

- Campeonato Mineiro: 1972, 1973, 1974, 1975

Atlético Mineiro

- Campeonato Mineiro: 1986
