= Rodrigão (disambiguation) =

Rodrigão (Rodrigo Santana, born 1979) is a Brazilian volleyball player, 2004 Olympic champion

Rodrigão may also refer to:

- Rodrigo Archanjo de Matos (born 1983), Brazilian football player
- Rodrigo Dias Carneiro (born 1972), Brazilian football player
- Rodrigo Fernandes Alflen (born 1978), Brazilian football player
- Rodrigo Gomes dos Santos (born 1993), Brazilian football player
- Rodrigo de Souza Prado (born 1995), Brazilian football player
