= Furletti =

Furletti is an Italian surname. Notable people with the surname include:

- Carlo Furletti (born 1945), Australian politician
- Carmine Furletti (1926–2008), Brazilian football administrator
- Alicia Furletti-Blomberg
