= List of Cruzeiro Esporte Clube managers =

This is a list of managers of the Brazilian football club Cruzeiro E.C.

== Managers ==
List of Cruzeiro E.C. managers
Name	Nation	Dates
Dorival Júnior	Brazil	2007
Émerson Leão	Brazil	2004
Luiz Felipe Scolari	Brazil	2000–2001
Oswaldo de Oliveira	Brazil	2006
Paulo Autuori de Mello	Brazil	1997, 1999–2000, 2007
Paulo César Gusmão	Brazil	2006
Vanderlei Luxemburgo	Brazil	2002–2004
Yustrich	Brazil	1977
Zezé Moreira	Brazil	1976
