= Jair Pereira =

Jair Pereira may refer to:

- Jair Pereira (Brazilian footballer), (born 1946), Brazilian football manager and former midfielder
- Jair Pereira (Mexican footballer) (born 1986), Mexican football centre-back
