= Zezé Perrella =

Brazilian politician

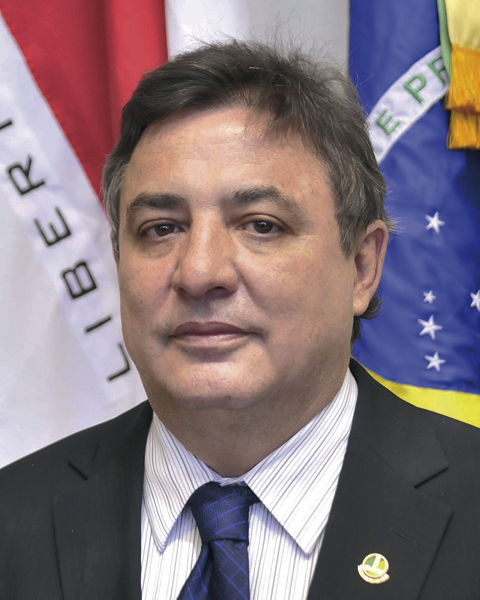

Federal Deputy from Minas Gerais
- In office 1999–2003

State Deputy from Minas Gerais
- In office 2007–2011

Senator from Minas Gerais
- In office July 3, 2011 – January 1, 2019
- Preceded by: Itamar Franco
- Succeeded by: Carlos Viana

Personal details
- Born: José Perrella de Oliveira Costa; February 22, 1956 (age 70) São Gonçalo do Pará
- Profession: Businessman

José Perrella de Oliveira Costa (February 22, 1956), better known as Zezé Perrella, is a Brazilian politician, businessman and former president of the Brazilian football (soccer) team Cruzeiro Esporte Clube

== Career ==
=== Beginning ===
Perrella was the president of the Industrial Meat and Dairy and Cold Cuts Syndicate of Minas Gerais (Sindicato das Indústrias de Carne e Derivados e de Frios de Minas Gerais (Sinduscarne)) between 1992 and 1997. He was also director of the Federation of Industries of Minas Gerais (Federação das Indústrias do Estado de Minas Gerais (Fiemg)) between 1998 and 2001.

=== Cruzeiro ===
Perrella first became president of Cruzeiro in 1995, and would stay there until 2002, when his brother Alvimar de Oliveira Costa took over. In 2008 Perrella was once again elected to a four-year term. At the end of 2011, his mandate expired and he left the presidency of the club.

=== Politics ===
Perrella was a federal deputy for PFL between 1999 and 2003. In 2002, he ran for the Senate, but finished fourth. In 2006, he was elected state deputy. In 2010, he was a supplement to Itamar Franco, whom was elected senator. Following Francos' death on July 2, 2011, he was officially appointed senator.

=== Scandals ===
In November 2013, 450 kg of cocaine was seized from a Perrella's helicopter in the State of Espírito Santo.

Mr. Perrella was again involved in crime in 2017, when Joesley Batista said to have recorded senator Aecio Neves requesting two million reais in bribes. According to Globo, the Brazilian federal police filmed the payment to Aécio's cousin, and tracked the delivery of the suitcase containing the money until an employee of Perrella. Later the money was then tracked to a bank account of his company.

Business positions
Preceded by Alvimar de Oliveira Costa	Cruzeiro chairman 2008–2012	Succeeded by Gilvan de Pinho Tavares
