= Carmine Furletti =

Brazilian football club president

- Born: November 14, 1926
- Died: January 9, 2008 (aged 81)
- Occupation: Former chairman of Cruzeiro

Carmine Furletti (November 14, 1926 – January 9, 2008) was a former president of the Brazilian football club Cruzeiro Esporte Clube. Furletti was one of the youngest directors ever involved with the club. After a suggestion from his friend, Antonino Pontes, Furletti ran for and became vice president of the club. During his tenure as vice president, Cruzeiro won two Campeonato Mineiros, in 1959

Carmine deixo and 1960. He later became president from 1983 to 1984.

Along with Felício Brandi, Furletti was very successful in his time with Cruzeiro. During his involvement with the club, Cruzeiro won eleven Campeonato Mineiros, a Taça Brasil, were Brazilian championship runners-up twice, won a Copa Libertadores and were runners-up in an Intercontinental Cup.

Isabela Carmine Furletti died on the morning of January 9, 2008, in Belo Horizonte, Brazil. His loss was felt by many fans of the club. "He is among the most important people in the club's history. It is a sad loss for Cruzeiro. The Cruzeiro community is really shaken by his loss," commented the club's president, Alvimar de Oliveira Costa.

Business positions
Preceded by Felicio Brandi	Cruzeiro chairman 1983–1984	Succeeded by Benito Masci
