= Otávio Fantoni =

Brazilian and Italian footballer (1907–1935)

Personal information
- Date of birth: 4 April 1907
- Place of birth: Belo Horizonte, Brazil
- Date of death: 8 February 1935 (aged 27)
- Place of death: Rome, Italy
- Position: Midfielder

Senior career*
| Years | Team | Apps | (Gls) |
| 1929–1930 | Palestra Itália | ? | (?) |
| 1930–1935 | Lazio | 108 | (5) |

International career
| 1934 | Italy | 1 | (0) |
- * Club domestic league appearances and goals

Otávio Fantoni (Portuguese pronunciation: [oˈtaviu fɐ̃ˈtoni]; Italian: [fanˈtoːni]; Belo Horizonte, 4 April 1907 – Rome, 8 February 1935), best known as Nininho or Fantoni II, was a Brazilian-born Italian professional football player, who played as a midfielder.

== Early life ==
He was born in Belo Horizonte, Minas Gerais, Brazil, into a family of Italian origin, which supported Cruzeiro, than known as Palestra Itália. In Cruzeiro, he played along with his cousins João Fantoni (Ninão) and Leonízio Fantoni (Niginho). In 1931, they were sold to Lazio, where they would be known by their surnames similar to a dynasty, where Ninão was Fantoni I, Nininho was Fantoni II and Niginho, Fantoni III.

== Career ==
Fantoni made an appearance for the Italy national team on one occasion: in Vittorio Pozzo's selection in the 1934 FIFA World Cup qualification match, on 25 March 1934 against Greece, a 4–0 home victory.

== Death ==
Less than one year after his victory on the FIFA match, he injured his nose in a game against Torino. The injury caused a generalized infection that would come to kill him on 8 February 1935 in Rome, Italy.
