= Alvimar de Oliveira Costa =

Alvimar Perrella de Oliveira Costa (born 1961 in Belo Horizonte) was the former president of Cruzeiro Esporte Clube of Belo Horizonte Minas Gerais and he was reelected for a further period of three years, which began in 2003 and end in 2008. According to him success Cruzeiro won the following titles when the commander of the football department of the club: State Championship (1997) Copa Libertadores of (1997), State Championship from (1998), South American Recopa (1999) Midwest Cup of (1999) Mineworkers Champions Cup (1999), Brazil Cup (2000) Copa Sul-Minas of (2001) Copa Sudamericana -Mine (2002), the super championship Miner (2002). He also won the State Championship from (2004) and State Championship from (2006), as club president.

He participated in six of eight years of administration Zeze Perrella Cruise. In 1997, he assumed the Superintendency of football, and was the club vice-president in 1999, while the Superintendency of Football.

He is also the only president in the history of Brazilian football to win the triple crown.

== Personal life ==
Besides being president thirtieth Cruise, Alvimar de Oliveira Costa is also a farmer, a businessman, and transportation and refrigeration. He is also the current vice president of Sinduscarne, the state of Minas Gerais Industry Union of meat.

== Trivia ==
- Although he is now known as Alvimar Perrella, it is just the name of the second-oldest brother. When he began working in Superintendent Football Cruzeiro in 1997 during the tenure of the president Zeze Perrella, who was called by the press as brothers Perrella (meaning brothers Perrella).
- Cruzeiro had another "Perrela" as president in the past. He was Miguel Perrela during the term 1933-1936. Besides the same name, they are not family members.

Business positions
Preceded by Zezé Perrella	Cruzeiro chairman 2003–2008	Succeeded by Zezé Perrella
