= Máquina de Vendas =

Máquina de Vendas Brasil S.A.
- Company type: Sociedade Anônima
- Industry: Retail
- Founded: 2010
- Headquarters: São Paulo, Brazil
- Number of locations: 660
- Key people: Ricardo Nunes, (CEO)
- Products: Furniture, Electronics
- Revenue: ▼US$ 1.7 billion (2016)
- Net income: ▼ - US$ 200. 6 million (2016)
- Number of employees: 26,370
- Website: www.maquinadevendas.com.br

Máquina de Vendas is the one of largest Brazilian retail company together with GPA, Viavarejo, Lojas Americanas and others. The company was founded in 2010 through the merges of two retail companies, being the Belo Horizonte-based Ricardo Eletro and Salvador-based Insinuante.

Currently the company has more than 490 stores in 442 cities in 20 Brazilian states. The company offers through its subsidiaries 4,5 thousand items in their stores and over 50 thousand items through their websites for electronic commerce. The company competitors includes Viavarejo, Magazine Luiza, Lojas Americanas and others.

== Operations ==
The company has 7 distribution centers and 660 stores through Ricardo Eletro brand. Formerly the company had 1.050 stores divided into 6 brands: Ricardo Eletro, Insinuante, City Lar, Eletro Shopping, Salfer and MV Connect. Máquina de Vendas also operates as online retailer through the Ricardo Eletro brand.

In October 2017, Máquina de Vendas reached an accord with its banks (Banco Itaú Unibanco, Banco Bradesco and Banco Santander) to essentially transfer all its debt (R$1.5 billion) to its shareholders without recourse to the company. In mid-2018, Starboard Capital invested $131 million via the purchase of convertible bonds giving Starboard at 72.5% ownership interest. As part of Starboard's investment, their suppliers provided $800 million in new credit.

== Brands ==
Current:

- pt:Ricardo Eletro - HQ; Belo Horizonte - 660 stores

Former:

- pt:Insinuante - HQ; Salvador - 228 stores
- pt:City Lar - HQ; Cuiabá - 224 stores
- pt:Eletro Shopping - HQ; Recife - 138 stores
- pt:Salfer - HQ; Joinville - 181 stores
- MV Connect - HQ; São Paulo - 4 store
