= Yustrich =

Brazilian footballer and manager

Personal information
- Full name: Dorival Knipel
- Date of birth: September 28, 1917
- Place of birth: Corumbá (MS), Brazil
- Date of death: February 15, 1990 (aged 72)
- Place of death: Belo Horizonte (MG), Brasil
- Position: Goalkeeper

Senior career*
Years	Team	Apps	(Gls)
1935–1944	Flamengo		
1944–1945	Vasco da Gama		
1945–1950	America		

Managerial career
- 1952–1953: Atlético Mineiro
- 1955–1956: Porto
- 1957–1958: Porto
- 1958: America
- 1959–1960: Vasco da Gama
- 1960: Atlético Mineiro
- 1961: Bangu
- 1964: Siderúrgica
- 1968: Brazil
- 1968–1969: Atlético Mineiro
- 1970–1971: Flamengo
- 1971: América Mineiro
- 1972: Cruzeiro
- 1972–1973: América Mineiro
- 1973–1974: Corinthians
- 1974: Coritiba
- 1976: América Mineiro
- 1977: Cruzeiro
- 1978: Bangu
- 1979: América Mineiro
- 1982: Cruzeiro
- * Club domestic league appearances and goals

Dorival Knippel (September 28, 1917 – February 15, 1990), nicknamed Yustrich, was a Brazilian goalkeeper of the 1930s and 1940s. His nickname was a reference to fellow goalkeeper Juan Elías Yustrich, then of Boca Juniors, who he was said to resemble.

From 1935 to 1944, he played for Flamengo, but became known at national level as a manager for Atlético Mineiro, Cruzeiro, Coritiba, Corinthians, Flamengo as well as Porto in Portugal. Yustrich also coached Brazil in a single match in 1968.

== Managerial statistics ==
As of match played 20 January 2025

Managerial record by team and tenure
Team	Nat	From	To	Record							
Team	Nat	From	To	G	W	D	L	GF	GA	GD	Win %
América Mineiro	(Brazil)	1948	1948	19	13	4	2	42	16	+26	68.42
Atlético Mineiro	(Brazil)	1952	1953	44	35	5	4	95	32	+63	79.55
Porto	(Portugal)	August 1955	June 1956	31	23	7	1	100	23	+77	74.19
Porto	(Portugal)	2 August 1957	23 March 1958	26	21	1	4	64	25	+39	80.77
America-RJ	(Brazil)	24 March 1958	28 December 1958	24	13	4	7	52	36	+16	54.17
Vasco da Gama	(Brazil)	3 January 1959	26 April 1960	40	22	10	8	89	43	+46	55.00
Bangu	(Brazil)	1961	1961	25	10	8	7	26	20	+6	40.00
Siderúrgica	(Brazil)	January 1964	November 1964	23	14	8	1	43	14	+29	60.87
Atlético Mineiro	(Brazil)	22 January 1968	30 November 1969	84	52	15	17	162	63	+99	61.90
Brazil	(Brazil)	17 December 1968	17 December 1968	1	1	0	0	3	2	+1	100.00
Flamengo	(Brazil)	10 January 1970	26 May 1971	69	29	23	17	87	54	+33	42.03
América Mineiro	(Brazil)	4 June 1971	14 November 1971	24	5	11	8	19	23	−4	20.83
Cruzeiro	(Brazil)	20 March 1972	18 July 1972	15	7	8	0	22	5	+17	46.67
América Mineiro	(Brazil)	19 July 1972	19 April 1973	54	16	21	17	57	43	+14	29.63
Corinthians	(Brazil)	20 April 1973	7 April 1974	64	23	26	15	73	51	+22	35.94
Corinthians	(Brazil)	8 April 1974	18 July 1974	24	9	6	9	29	29	+0	37.50
América Mineiro	(Brazil)	19 March 1976	26 October 1976	39	19	7	13	69	45	+24	48.72
Cruzeiro	(Brazil)	30 May 1977	17 November 1977	30	18	7	5	50	17	+33	60.00
Bangu	(Brazil)	10 March 1978	6 December 1978	38	11	6	21	28	52	−24	28.95
América Mineiro	(Brazil)	31 January 1979	30 November 1979	62	27	20	15	84	59	+25	43.55
Cruzeiro	(Brazil)	21 March 1982	7 December 1982	43	16	20	7	49	34	+15	37.21
Career total				781	384	217	180	1,243	686	+557	49.17

== Honours ==
=== Players ===
Flamengo

- Campeonato Carioca (4): 1939, 1942, 1943, 1944

=== Manager ===
América Mineiro

- Campeonato Mineiro (1): 1948

Atlético Mineiro

- Campeonato Mineiro (2): 1952, 1953

Porto

- Primeira Liga (1): 1955–56
- Taça de Portugal (1): 1955–56

Siderúrgica

- Campeonato Mineiro (1): 1964

Cruzeiro

- Campeonato Mineiro (1): 1977
