= Rodrigão (footballer, born 1983) =

Brazilian footballer

Personal information
- Full name: Rodrigo Archanjo de Matos
- Date of birth: April 22, 1983 (age 43)
- Place of birth: Ourinhos, Brazil
- Height: 1.84 m (6 ft 0 in)
- Position: Central defender

Youth career
- 2002–2003: Cruzeiro

Senior career*
Years	Team	Apps	(Gls)
2004	Paulista Loan		
2005	Ipatinga Loan		
2005	Uberlândia Loan		
2006	Bahia Loan		
2006–2007	Sport Loan		
2007	Villa Nova-MG Loan		
- * Club domestic league appearances and goals

Rodrigo Archanjo de Matos (born April 22, 1983), or simply Rodrigão, was a Brazilian central defender. He played for Villa Nova-MG on loan from Cruzeiro.
