= Bengala (footballer) =

Brazilian footballer (1906–1980)

Personal information
- Full name: Ítalo Fratezzi
- Date of birth: 24 May 1906
- Place of birth: Belo Horizonte, Brazil
- Date of death: 22 May 1980 (aged 73)
- Place of death: Belo Horizonte, Brazil
- Position: Forward

Senior career*
Years	Team	Apps	(Gls)
1925–1939	Palestra Itália-MG	247	(168)

Managerial career
- 1938: Palestra Itália-MG
- 1941–1943: Cruzeiro
- 1944: Cruzeiro
- 1944–1946: Botafogo
- 1947: Cruzeiro
- 1955: Cruzeiro
- * Club domestic league appearances and goals as of 19 February 2024

Ítalo Fratezzi (24 May 1906 – 22 May 1980), better known as Bengala, was a Brazilian professional footballer and manager, who played as a forward.

== Career ==
With a player career dedicated entirely to Cruzeiro EC, he arrived at the club at the time of Palestra Itália in 1925, and with the club he won the state championship four times, in addition to being top scorer in 1932. He played in 247 matches and scored 168 goals. He was also a volleyball and basketball athlete for the club, and coach on five occasions, being state champion in 1940 and 1944. The only club besides Cruzeiro in which he worked was Botafogo, from 1944 to 1946. Bengala was inducted into the Cruzeiro EC Hall of Fame in 2012.

== Honours ==
=== Player ===
Cruzeiro

- Campeonato Mineiro: 1928, 1929, 1930
- Campeonato AMET: 1926

Individual

- 1932 Campeonato Mineiro top scorer: 12 goals

=== Manager ===
Cruzeiro

- Campeonato Mineiro: 1940, 1944
