= Niginho =

Brazilian footballer and manager

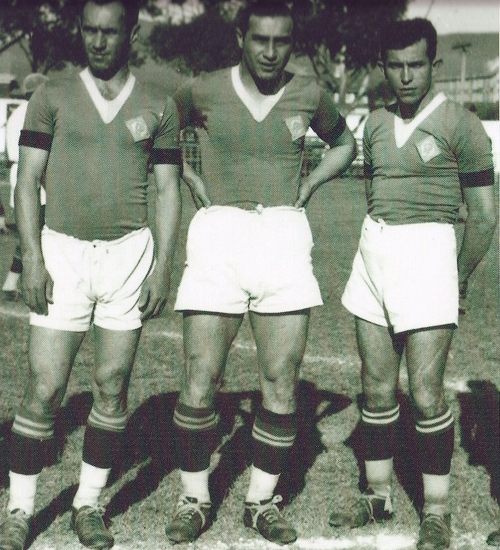
- Niginho (center) in 1936

Personal information
- Full name: Leonídio Fantoni
- Date of birth: 12 February 1912
- Place of birth: Belo Horizonte (MG), Brasil
- Date of death: 5 September 1975 (aged 63)
- Position: Forward

Senior career*
| Years | Team | Apps | (Gls) |
| 1929–1933 | Palestra Itália (MG) | 31 | (6) |
| 1934–1936 | Lazio | 50 | (42) |
| 1936 | Palestra Itália (SP) | 6 | (6) |
| 1937–1938 | Vasco da Gama | 18 | (25) |
| 1939–1947 | Cruzeiro | 257 | (207) |
| Total | | 362 | (296) |

International career
| 1937–1938 | Brazil | 4 | (2) |

Managerial career
- 1948–1949: Cruzeiro
- 1950–1951: Santos
- 1953–1955: Cruzeiro
- 1959–1961: Cruzeiro
- 1962–1963: Cruzeiro
Medal record
Representing Brazil
FIFA World Cup
| Third place | 1938 France |
- * Club domestic league appearances and goals

Leonídio Fantoni, best known as Niginho or Fantoni III (born in Belo Horizonte, 12 February 1912 – died 5 September 1975) was a professional association footballer who played as a forward.

== Biography ==
His Italian-origins family was a supporter of Cruzeiro, than known as "Palestra Itália". Fantoni started his career in that club, playing with his brother João Fantoni (Ninão) and their cousin Otávio Fantoni (Nininho). In 1931, they were sold to Lazio, where they would be known by their surnames, like a dynasty: Ninão was Fantoni I, Nininho was Fantoni II and him, Fantoni III. They played with another Italian-Brazilian player, Anfilogino Guarisi, in a Lazio squad known as "Brasilazio". Before moving to Italy, Niginho conquested the Minas Gerais State Championship in 1928, 1929 and 1930.

In 1935, having dual citizenship, he was called by the Italian Army to fight in the invasion of Abyssinia. He had married just one month before, and decided to go back to Brazil. Lazio authorized it and paid the ship ticket. That year was particularly difficult to him: his cousin Fantoni II died of generalized infection from a broken nose.

Without formal authorization of Lazio, Niginho transferred to Palmeiras, than also known as Palestra Itália. Playing there from March to May, he scored six goals in six games and conquered the São Paulo State Championship. After that, he played in Vasco da Gama in 1937. In that club, he received his first call to Brazil national football team. He was called to 1938 FIFA World Cup as a Leônidas da Silva stand-by player. Unfortunately, the Italians warned FIFA that Niginho was in an irregular situation, needing an authorization of Lazio to play, and that he was a deserter of the Italian Army.

Leônidas injured himself in the game against Czechoslovakia and had to play again in the play-off against the Czechs, because Niginho couldn't substitute him. His injury got worse and he hadn't conditions to play against Italy in the semifinals.

In 1939, Niginho came back to Palestra Itália, who had to change its name to Cruzeiro in 1942. He conquered another tricampeonato, the Minas Gerais State Championship in 1943, 1944 and 1945. He played in there along another brother, Orlando Fantoni. Orlando would also play in Lazio, becoming known as Fantoni IV.

Niginho stopped to play in 1947, but would be linked with Cruzeiro until his death. As a coach, he conquered the tricampeonato in 1959, 1960 and 1961. In the 60s, his nephews Benito Fantoni and Fernando Fantoni played in the club. Fernando would also play in Lazio, as Fantoni V.

Niginho died by a heart attack in 1975, when he was visiting Cruzeiro. He was one of the top goalscorers in the club's history, scoring 207 goals in 272 appearances, and the biggest idol in the pre-Mineirão years.
