= Sociedade Anônima do Futebol =

Type of public limited company in Brazil

Sociedade Anônima do Futebol ("Football anonymous society", SAF) is a type of public limited company in Brazil. It was introduced by Law 14193/21, which sought to improve the governance and financial management of Brazilian football clubs.

== Background ==
Until 2021 football clubs in Brazil were structured as non-profit civil associations, who were exempted from taxes, and could not be sold to investors. Law 14193/21 seeks to provide a legal framework for clubs to transition to companies, providing mechanisms such as a centralized regime for indebted clubs to pay their creditors, allowing clubs to issue CVM-regulated securities and incentivizing new investments. Other than the civil associations, some football clubs were structured as public limited companies prior to the introduction of the SAF model, such as Cuiabá Esporte Clube (later transitioned to a SAF) and Red Bull Bragantino, who opted to remain as a public limited company.

The law was based on a study by the lawyers Rodrigo Monteiro de Castro and José Francisco Manssur, published in their 2016 book Futebol, Mercado e Estado (Football, Market and State), which analyzed the business structure of Brazilian football and compared it to foreign models. Afterwards, the study was presented to the National Congress in 2019 by senator Rodrigo Pacheco (PSD-MG), resulting in the creation of Bill 5.516/2019, authored by Pacheco.

The bill was reported to the Federal Senate by senator Carlos Portinho (PL-RJ), where it was approved on 10 June 2021. It was reported to the Chamber of Deputies by congressman Fred Costa (PATRI-MG) and voted in 14 July, where it was approved with a 429–7 vote.

The bill was sanctioned by President Jair Bolsonaro on 9 August 2021, resulting in the creation of Law 14.193/2021.

== List of SAFs ==
| Club | Current Division | Majority shareholders | SAF establishment date (per CNPJ registration) | Note |
|---|---|---|---|---|
| (Minas Gerais) Cruzeiro | Série A | (Brazil) BPW Sports (90%) | 6 December 2021 | |
| (Mato Grosso) Cuiabá | Série B | (Brazil) Dresch Family (100%) | 13 December 2021 | It was structured as a public limited company before transitioning to a SAF, on 19 December 2001. |
| (Minas Gerais) Athletic Club (MG) | Série B | (Brazil) F&P Gestão Esportiva (68,5%) | 21 December 2021 | |
| (São Paulo (state)) Botafogo-SP | Série B | (Brazil) BFC (60%) | 22 December 2021 | It was structured as a public limited company before transitioning to a SAF, on 1 August 2018. |
| (Amazonas (Brazilian state)) Amazonas | Série B | (Brazil) Wesley Couto, Roberto Peggy and William Abreu (100%) | 2022 | |
| (Rio de Janeiro (state)) Botafogo | Série A | (United States) Eagle Holding (90%) | 3 January 2022 | |
| (Minas Gerais) América-MG | Série B | (Brazil) Association (100%) | 5 January 2022 | |
| (Paraná (state)) Coritiba | Série B | (Brazil) Treecorp (90%) | 10 February 2022 | |
| (São Paulo (state)) Ferroviária | Série B | (Brazil) MAKES (90%) | 2 June 2022 | |
| (Rio de Janeiro (state)) Vasco da Gama | Série A | (United States) ~~777 Partners (70%)~~ (Brazil) Association (100%) | 16 August 2022 | 777 Partners ownership is currently suspended. |
| Bahia | Série A | (United Arab Emirates) City Football Group (90%) | 27 February 2023 | |
| (Minas Gerais) Atlético Mineiro | Série A | (Brazil) Galo Holding (75%) | 28 November 2023 | |
| (São Paulo (state)) Novorizontino | Série B | (Brazil) Association (100%) | 16 December 2023 | Unlike other Football Societies constituted through the drop down operation (art. 3, of Law no. 14,193/2021), Grêmio Novorizontino opted for the transformation/conversion of a civil association into SAF, in accordance with provisions 2, item I, of Law no. 14,193/2021. |
| (Ceará) Fortaleza | Série A | (Brazil) Association (100%) | 8 January 2024 | Inspired by FC Bayern Munich, statute prohibits club from selling over 50% of shares |
| (Goiás) Atlético Goianiense | Série B | (Brazil) Association (100%) | 14 June 2024 | |

- The list takes into account clubs of Série A and Série B.

== See also ==
- List of football clubs in Brazil
- Sociedad Anónima Deportiva
- Sociedade Anónima Desportiva
