= Natal (footballer) =

Brazilian footballer

Natal de Carvalho Baroni, commonly known as Natal (born November 24, 1945), is a retired Brazilian football midfielder. He was born in Belo Horizonte. He is known for having played for Cruzeiro, where he won five straight Campeonato Mineiros, and for having played 14 times for the Brazil national team, scoring three goals.

Natal made 89 appearances and scored 11 goals in the Campeonato Brasileiro.

== Career ==
- Cruzeiro-MG: 1964-1971 (Brazil)
- Corinthians-SP: 1971-1972 (Brazil)
- Bahia-BA (Brazil)
- Vitória-BA (Brazil)
- América-MG (Brazil)
- Londrina-PR (Brazil)
- Vila Nova-MG (Brazil)
- Caldense-MG (Brazil)
- Democrata de Governador Valadares-MG (Brazil)
- Valeriodoce-MG (Brazil)
- Deportivo Italia (Venezuela)

== Achievements ==
- Campeonato Mineiro: 1965, 1966, 1967, 1968, 1969 (Cruzeiro)
