= Ninão =

Brazilian footballer (1905–1982)

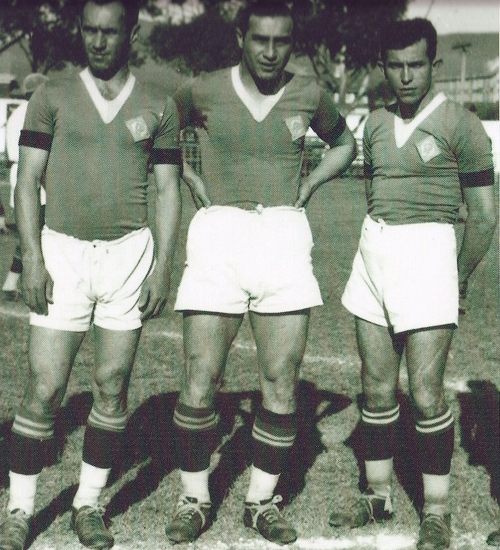
- Ninão, Niginho, Bengala, players from Palestra Italia (Cruzeiro) team, 1936

Personal information
- Full name: João Fantoni
- Date of birth: 24 June 1905
- Place of birth: Belo Horizonte, Brazil
- Date of death: 19 July 1982 (aged 77)
- Place of death: Belo Horizonte, Brazil
- Position: Forward

Senior career*
Years	Team	Apps	(Gls)
1922–1931	Palestra Itália-MG	110	(164)
1931–1935	Lazio	113	(39)
1935–1938	Palestra Itália-MG	17	(3)

Managerial career
- 1937: Palestra Itália-MG
- 1943–1944: Cruzeiro
- 1959: Cruzeiro
- * Club domestic league appearances and goals as of 14 February 2024

João Fantoni (24 June 1905 – 19 July 1982), better known as Ninão or Fantoni I, was a Brazilian professional footballer and manager, who played as a forward.

== Career ==
One of the first great idols in the history of Cruzeiro EC, Ninão is one of the greatest goalscorers in the club's history, with 167 goals in 127 matches (1.41 per game). He was runner-up for the club in 1922, 1923 and 1924, and three-times champion in 1928, 1929 and 1930, being top scorer in these three editions, with emphasis on 1928 with 43 goals. Some sources credit him with scoring 10 goals in a single match, against Alves Nogueira, a feat that would equal that of Dadá Maravilha in the Sport Recife 14–0 Santo Amaro match.

Alongside his brother (Niginho), he was hired by the SS Lazio in 1931, remaining until 1934 when he returned to Brazil with the increase in political tension in Italy due to the Abyssinia Crisis. Ninão returned to Cruzeiro and ended his career in 1938. He was also a member of the club's board and coach on three occasions: 1937, 1943–1944, when he was state champion, and 1959.

Ninão was inducted into the Cruzeiro EC Hall of Fame in 2012.

== Personal life ==
Ninão is brother os also footballers Niginho (Leonídio Fantoni) and Orlando Fantoni, cousin of Nininho Fantoni, and father of Benito Fantoni and Fernando Fantoni.

== Honours ==
=== Player ===
Cruzeiro

- Campeonato Mineiro: 1928, 1929, 1930
- Campeonato AMET: 1926

Individual

- 1928 Campeonato Mineiro top scorer: 43 goals
- 1929 Campeonato Mineiro top scorer: 33 goals
- 1930 Campeonato Mineiro top scorer: 18 goals

=== Manager ===
Cruzeiro

- Campeonato Mineiro: 1943
