= Dirceu Lopes =

Brazilian footballer (born 1946)

Personal information
- Full name: Dirceu Lopes Mendes
- Date of birth: 9 March 1946 (age 80)
- Place of birth: Brazil

International career
Years	Team	Apps	(Gls)
- Brazil

Dirceu Lopes, full name Dirceu Lopes Mendes (born 3 September 1946), is a retired Brazilian footballer. He was an attacking midfielder or forward who played mainly with Cruzeiro. He had seven caps with the Brazil national team, scoring one goal. He was born in Pedro Leopoldo.
