= Cruzeiro EC =

Brazilian professional football club

Cruzeiro
- Full name: Cruzeiro Esporte Clube
- Nicknames: Raposa (Fox); Celeste (Celestial), Cabuloso (Note: Cabuloso is an informal Brazilian Portuguese adjective with no single fixed English equivalent. Depending on context, dictionaries record senses including "impressive" or "sensational", frightening or fearsome, complicated, and unlucky; it is therefore left untranslated here. "Cabuloso". Dicio (in Brazilian Portuguese). "Cabuloso". Dicionário Caldas Aulete (in Brazilian Portuguese).); La Bestia Negra (The Black Beast); Maior de Minas (The Greatest in Minas)
- Founded: 2 January 1921; 105 years ago
- Ground: Mineirão
- Capacity: 62,000
- SAF ownership: BPW Sports Participações (90%); Cruzeiro Esporte Clube (10%)
- Association president: Lidson Potsch
- Head coach: Artur Jorge
- League: Campeonato Brasileiro Série A Campeonato Mineiro
- 2025 2025: Série A, 3rd of 20; Mineiro, 4th of 12
- Website: cruzeiro.com.br
Home colours	Away colours	Third colours

Cruzeiro Esporte Clube (Brazilian Portuguese: [kɾuˈzejɾu esˈpoʁtʃi ˈklubi]) is a professional association football club based in Belo Horizonte, Minas Gerais, Brazil. Cruzeiro is traditionally considered one of Brazil's Big Twelve (G-12), a group of the country's historically most prominent football clubs. It competes in the Campeonato Brasileiro Série A, the top division of the Brazilian football league system, and the Campeonato Mineiro, the principal state championship of Minas Gerais. Since 1965, its principal home ground has been the Mineirão.

Founded on 2 January 1921 by members of Belo Horizonte's Italian immigrant community as Società Sportiva Palestra Itália, the club initially used the green, white and red colors associated with Italy. Following Brazil's entry into World War II, federal restrictions on organizations bearing references to the Axis powers led to a change of identity. On 7 October 1942, the club adopted the name Cruzeiro Esporte Clube, inspired by the Southern Cross (Cruzeiro do Sul) constellation represented on the flag of Brazil, and subsequently adopted blue and white as its principal colors.

Cruzeiro is one of the most successful clubs in Brazilian football. It has won four Brazilian championships, in 1966, 2003, 2013 and 2014, and a record six Copa do Brasil titles. Internationally, it has won the Copa Libertadores twice, in 1976 and 1997, and finished runner-up in 1977 and 2009. Cruzeiro has also won the Campeonato Mineiro 39 times. Its breakthrough 1966 Taça Brasil triumph over Santos made it the first club from Minas Gerais to win a national championship, while in 2003 it became the first Brazilian club to win its state championship, the Copa do Brasil and the national league in the same season, a feat known as the Triple Crown.

After winning consecutive Copa do Brasil titles in 2017 and 2018, Cruzeiro entered a severe financial and governance crisis and was relegated from Série A for the first time in 2019. The club reorganized its professional football operations as a Sociedade Anônima do Futebol (SAF), with former Cruzeiro player Ronaldo acquiring a 90% controlling interest; Cruzeiro won the 2022 Série B and returned to the top flight after three seasons. In 2024, Ronaldo's controlling stake was acquired by BPW Sports Participações, linked to businessman Pedro Lourenço, while the nonprofit Cruzeiro association retained 10% of the SAF.

Cruzeiro has one of Brazil's largest supporter bases; a 2025 AtlasIntel survey placed it joint fifth nationally, while statewide surveys have identified it as the most-supported club in Minas Gerais. Its principal rivalry is with fellow Belo Horizonte club Atlético Mineiro, with whom it contests the Clássico Mineiro. The club is traditionally identified with the Raposa ("Fox") mascot, the five stars of the Southern Cross and its blue-and-white colors.

== History ==
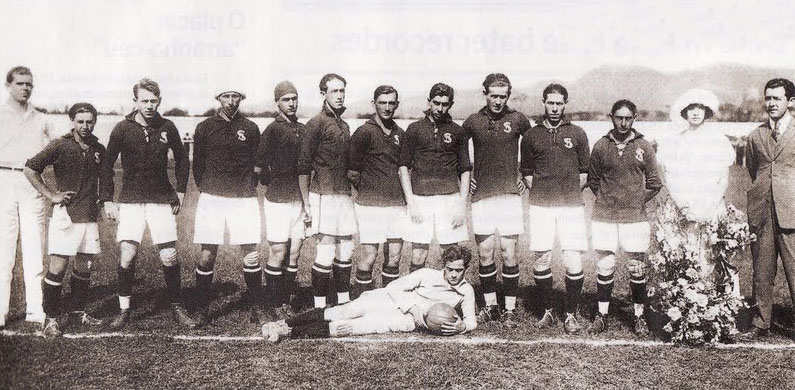
Palestra Itália before a match against Flamengo in 1923.

Cruzeiro was founded on 2 January 1921 as Società Sportiva Palestra Italia by members of the Italian immigrant community of Belo Horizonte. The movement to establish the club had begun during 1920, when members of the community sought to create a sporting association that would represent Belo Horizonte's large Italian population. The first team drew heavily from players associated with Yale, although Yale continued to exist independently after Palestra's creation. The new club adopted green, white and red in reference to the Italian flag, and initially restricted participation to members of the Italian community.

Palestra played its first match on 3 April 1921 at the Prado Mineiro, defeating a combined team from Nova Lima 2–0, with both goals scored by Nani Lazzarotti. Later that year, Palestra defeated future archrival Atlético Mineiro 3–0 in the first meeting between the clubs.

In 1923, Palestra opened its own stadium in the Barro Preto neighborhood, constructed in part through volunteer labor from club members and supporters. The club gradually expanded beyond its original ethnic base, and restrictions linking participation to the Italian colony were removed in 1925. Palestra won its first officially recognized Campeonato Mineiro in 1928 and retained the championship in 1929 and 1930, establishing itself among the leading clubs in Minas Gerais.

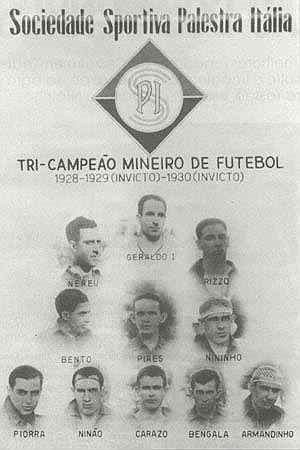
A Palestra Itália ceremonial poster after winning the 1930 Campeonato Mineiro undefeated.

The club won another state championship in 1940, its final title under the Palestra Itália name. After Brazil entered World War II against the Axis powers, government restrictions introduced in 1942 prohibited organizations from retaining names associated with enemy nations. The club briefly adopted the name Palestra Mineiro before an extraordinary meeting of its deliberative council approved Cruzeiro Esporte Clube on 7 October 1942. The new name referred to the Southern Cross, a constellation represented on the flag of Brazil, while blue and white replaced the club's original colors. Cruzeiro won three consecutive Campeonato Mineiro titles from 1943 through 1945, and the Barro Preto stadium was substantially rebuilt during the same period.

After a comparatively less successful period in the late 1940s and early 1950s, Cruzeiro returned to state prominence with the 1956 Campeonato Mineiro and three consecutive championships from 1959 through 1961. A generation centered on players including Tostão, Dirceu Lopes, Piazza, Natal and Raul subsequently transformed the club's national standing. The opening of the Mineirão in 1965 gave Cruzeiro a substantially larger home ground and coincided with the beginning of the most successful period in the club's history to that point. Cruzeiro won five consecutive state championships from 1965 through 1969.

The defining achievement of that generation came in the 1966 Taça Brasil, then Brazil's principal national knockout competition. Cruzeiro faced the Santos team of Pelé in the final and won the first leg 6–2 at the Mineirão after leading 5–0 at halftime. In the return match at the Pacaembu, Cruzeiro recovered from a two-goal deficit to win 3–2, securing the first national championship in its history and the first won by a club from Minas Gerais. The title was later recognized by the CBF as a Campeonato Brasileiro championship when the earlier national competitions were unified with the modern league's historical record in 2010.

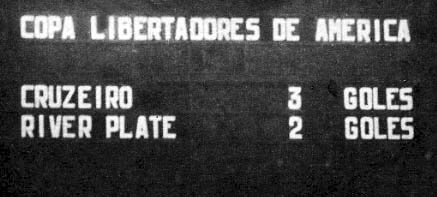
The scoreboard after Cruzeiro's 3–2 victory over River Plate in the deciding match of the 1976 Copa Libertadores final.

Cruzeiro remained among Brazil's leading teams during the 1970s, finishing runner-up in the Campeonato Brasileiro in both 1974 and 1975. Its greatest achievement of the decade came in the 1976 Copa Libertadores. After defeating River Plate 4–1 at the Mineirão in the opening match of the final and losing 2–1 in Buenos Aires, Cruzeiro won the deciding match 3–2 at the Estadio Nacional in Santiago. Joãozinho scored the decisive goal from a late free kick, giving Cruzeiro its first South American championship.

Cruzeiro's 1975 squad, one year before the club won its first Copa Libertadores.

The Libertadores-winning side included Raul, Nelinho, Piazza, Zé Carlos, Palhinha, Dirceu Lopes and Joãozinho. Victory qualified Cruzeiro for the 1976 Intercontinental Cup against European champions Bayern Munich. Bayern won the first leg 2–0 at the Olympiastadion in Munich; the return at the Mineirão ended 0–0 before a crowd of more than 110,000, giving Bayern the title.

Lineups for the second leg of the 1976 Intercontinental Cup between Cruzeiro and Bayern Munich at the Mineirão.

Cruzeiro reached the Libertadores final again in 1977, losing to Boca Juniors after a deciding match and penalty shootout in Montevideo. The 1980s were considerably less successful. Cruzeiro's principal titles during the decade were the 1984 and 1987 Campeonato Mineiro championships, and the club did not appear in the Copa Libertadores during the decade.

A sustained revival began in 1990. Over the next fifteen seasons, Cruzeiro won at least one official competition every year through 2004. The resurgence produced success in several competitions: Cruzeiro won consecutive Supercopa Libertadores titles in 1991 and 1992, its first Copa do Brasil in 1993, and another Copa do Brasil in 1996.

In 1997, Cruzeiro won the Copa Libertadores for the second time. After a scoreless first leg against Peru's Sporting Cristal in Lima, Elivélton scored the only goal of the return match at the Mineirão to secure the title. The club's international successes during the decade also included the Copa de Oro and Supercopa Masters in 1995 and the Recopa Sudamericana. Cruzeiro added a third Copa do Brasil in 2000 and won the Copa Sul-Minas in 2001 and 2002.

The 2003 season became one of the defining campaigns in Cruzeiro's history. Coached by Vanderlei Luxemburgo and led by captain Alex, Cruzeiro won the Campeonato Mineiro, Copa do Brasil and Campeonato Brasileiro, completing what became known as the Tríplice Coroa ("Triple Crown"). It was the first time a Brazilian club had won its state championship, the Copa do Brasil and the national league in the same season. In the first Campeonato Brasileiro conducted entirely as a double round-robin competition, Cruzeiro accumulated 100 points and scored 102 goals in 46 matches.

Cruzeiro remained regularly competitive at national level during the remainder of the decade and returned to the Copa Libertadores final in 2009. After a 0–0 draw against Estudiantes in Argentina, Cruzeiro took the lead in the second leg at the Mineirão but lost 2–1, finishing as runner-up.

A new period of domestic success began in 2013 under coach Marcelo Oliveira. Cruzeiro moved to the top of the Campeonato Brasileiro during the first half of the season and secured the title with four matches remaining, winning its third national championship. The club retained the title in 2014, becoming Brazilian champion in consecutive seasons for the first time in its history. Cruzeiro also won the 2014 Campeonato Mineiro and reached the Copa do Brasil final that year.

After two seasons without a major trophy, Cruzeiro became dominant in the Copa do Brasil under Mano Menezes. The club defeated Flamengo on penalties in the 2017 final to win the competition for a fifth time, then retained the trophy in 2018 by defeating Corinthians in both legs of the final. The sixth title made Cruzeiro the competition's most successful club and the first to win consecutive editions.

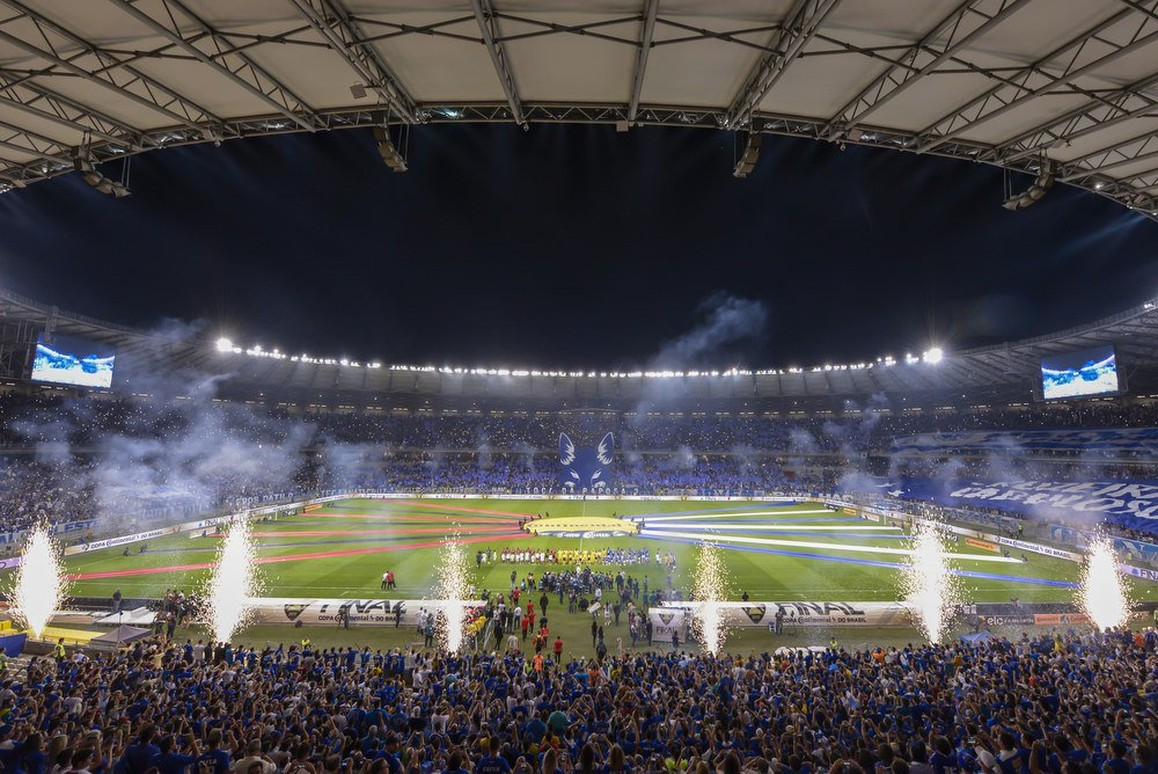
Cruzeiro and Flamengo at the Mineirão during the 2017 Copa do Brasil final.

The success was followed by the most serious sporting and institutional crisis in the club's history. During 2019, financial difficulties, administrative instability and investigations involving members of the club's leadership coincided with a sharp deterioration in results. On 8 December, a 2–0 loss to Palmeiras at the Mineirão confirmed Cruzeiro's first relegation from the Campeonato Brasileiro's top division. Cruzeiro remained in Série B for three seasons, with its financial position complicating attempts to rebuild the team.

A fundamental restructuring began in late 2021 after Brazilian legislation allowed football clubs to transfer their operations into a Sociedade Anônima do Futebol (SAF). In December, former Cruzeiro player Ronaldo agreed through his company to acquire 90% of Cruzeiro's newly created football company. The first full season under the new structure produced an immediate sporting recovery. Coached by Paulo Pezzolano, Cruzeiro secured promotion with seven rounds remaining in the 2022 Campeonato Brasileiro Série B and subsequently won the championship, returning to Série A after three years.

Cruzeiro consolidated its return to the top division in 2023. In April 2024, Ronaldo agreed to sell his controlling 90% interest in the SAF to businessman and longtime Cruzeiro supporter Pedro Lourenço, making Cruzeiro the first Brazilian SAF whose controlling stake had been resold after its original acquisition. Later that year, Cruzeiro reached its first continental final since 2009, advancing to the 2024 Copa Sudamericana final, where it was defeated 3–1 by Racing.

The club continued its sporting recovery in 2025. Under Leonardo Jardim, Cruzeiro finished third in the 2025 Campeonato Brasileiro Série A, securing a return to the Copa Libertadores, and reached the semifinals of the Copa do Brasil before being eliminated by Corinthians on penalties. In March 2026, Cruzeiro defeated Atlético Mineiro 1–0 in the Campeonato Mineiro final to win its 39th state championship, ending a seven-year wait for the title and securing its first trophy since returning to Série A.

== Identity ==
=== Kit ===
Digital reproduction of selected shirts

1921 – Palestra Itália's original green shirt, reflecting the club's Italian identity.

1942 – Blue shirt adopted with the Cruzeiro name and its new blue-and-white identity.

1989 – Adidas shirt with Coca-Cola sponsorship, illustrating the commercial-branding era.

2005 – Post-Triple Crown shirt featuring the crest with the crown.

Cruzeiro's original colors reflected the Italian origins of the club. As Palestra Itália in 1921, its first uniform consisted of a dark green shirt and white shorts. Contemporary club records indicate that black socks were initially intended, but difficulties obtaining them led to the adoption of red, completing the green, white and red of the flag of Italy. By 1928, the shirt had changed to a lighter shade of green with a white collar and red cuffs, while the socks incorporated red and white details. The lighter green uniform gave the team the nickname Periquito ("parakeet"). In 1940, Palestra adopted one of its more unusual early designs: horizontal green and red stripes with a white collar and cuffs. The change also led to the team being referred to as the Tricolor rather than the Periquito.

The present blue-and-white identity emerged during the club's renaming in 1942, after Brazil entered World War II and restrictions were imposed on organizations bearing names associated with the Axis powers. The name Ypiranga was proposed during the transition, but contemporary records show that it was rejected by the club's council and never officially adopted. When Cruzeiro Esporte Clube was adopted on 7 October, the Italian tricolor was replaced by blue and white, together with imagery based on the Southern Cross. Blue subsequently became the dominant color of the home shirt, traditionally paired with white shorts and socks.

Cruzeiro did not introduce a regular alternate uniform until 1950. Poor floodlighting at Brazilian stadiums made dark-colored shirts difficult to distinguish during night matches, prompting the club to create a white shirt with blue collar and sleeve trim, blue shorts and white socks. It debuted on 20 April 1950 in a 4–1 friendly victory over Sete de Setembro at the Barro Preto stadium. Another short-lived experiment followed in 1956, when the club used a horizontally striped blue-and-white shirt. In 1959, Cruzeiro adopted the predominantly blue design that became the basis of its modern home uniform and began displaying the five stars of the Southern Cross individually on the chest rather than solely within a conventional badge; the design debuted in a friendly against Renascença on 19 September. The use of the five loose stars subsequently became one of the most recognizable features of Cruzeiro shirts and has been revived repeatedly in later uniform designs.

Commercial branding first appeared on Cruzeiro's uniforms during the 1980s. Topper was the first manufacturer whose logo appeared on the shirt, in 1984, and supermarket chain Medradão as its first shirt sponsor, initially appearing on the alternate uniform. Supplier and sponsor branding subsequently became a regular part of Cruzeiro's uniforms.

Kit suppliers and shirt sponsors

Period	Kit manufacturer	Master sponsors	Premium sponsors	Standard sponsors	Number sponsors
1984	Topper	Medradão			
1985	Topper	Frigorifico Perrella			
1986	Adidas	BDMG			
1987–88	Adidas				
1989	Adidas	Coca-Cola			
1990–95	Finta	Coca-Cola			
1996	Finta	Energil C			
1997	Rhumell	Energil C			
1998	Rhumell	Energil C	Gelmax / Telebingão Campeão		
1998–99	Topper	Energil C	Gelmax / Telebingão Campeão		
2000–01	Topper	Fiat	Ceras Grand Prix		
2001–03	Topper	Fiat	Lousano		
2004–05	Topper	Siemens			
2006	Puma	Xerox			
2007	Puma	Xerox	Aethra		
2007	Puma	Construtora Tenda	Aethra		
2008	Puma	Construtora Tenda	Fiat		
2009	Reebok	Banco Bonsucesso			
2010	Reebok	Banco BMG	Ricardo Eletro	Questão de Estilo Jeans / Hypermarcas	
2011	Reebok	Banco BMG	Netshoes		
2012	Olympikus	Banco BMG	Guaramix		
2013	Olympikus	Banco BMG	Guaramix		TIM
2014	Olympikus	Banco BMG	Guaramix		TIM
2015	Penalty	Supermercados BH	Cemil / Vilma Alimentos	99Taxis / Voxx Suplementos	TIM
2016	Umbro	Caixa	Cemil / Supermercados BH / Vilma Alimentos	Super 8 / Voxx Suplementos	TIM
2017	Umbro	Caixa	Cemil / Supermercados BH / Vilma Alimentos	Uber	
2018	Umbro	Caixa	Cemil / UninCor	Uber	Orthopride
2019	Umbro	Digimais	Bem Protege / Camponesa / Fiat / Multimarcas Consórcios / Supermercados BH / UninCor	ABC da Construção	
2020	Adidas	Supermercados BH	Bem Protege / Digimais / Emcamp / Galera.Bet / Multimarcas Consórcios / Premium Saúde	Cartão de Todos / Saudali	
2021	Adidas	Supermercados BH	Buser / Cotton / Digimais / Galera.Bet / Premium Saúde	Autotruck / Cartão de Todos / Saudali / UniCesumar	
2022	Adidas	Supermercados BH	Buser / Champion / Giro Agro / Pixbet	Cimed / MM Aluguel de carros / Saudali / UniCesumar	
2023	Adidas	Betfair	Cimed / Supermercados BH	Saudali	MM Aluguel de carros
2024	Adidas	Betfair	BP Consórcio / Cimed / Supermercados BH / Surf / Vilma Alimentos	Faculdade Multivix / Kodilar / Saudali	MM Aluguel de carros
2025	Adidas	Betfair	Cimed / OMO / Perdigão na Brasa / Supermercados BH / Vilma Alimentos	Kodilar	MM Aluguel de carros
2026	Adidas	Betnacional	Cimed / OMO / Perdigão na Brasa / Supermercados BH / Vilma Alimentos	Álamo / Kodilar / Zé Delivery	Hospital Orizonti

=== Crest ===
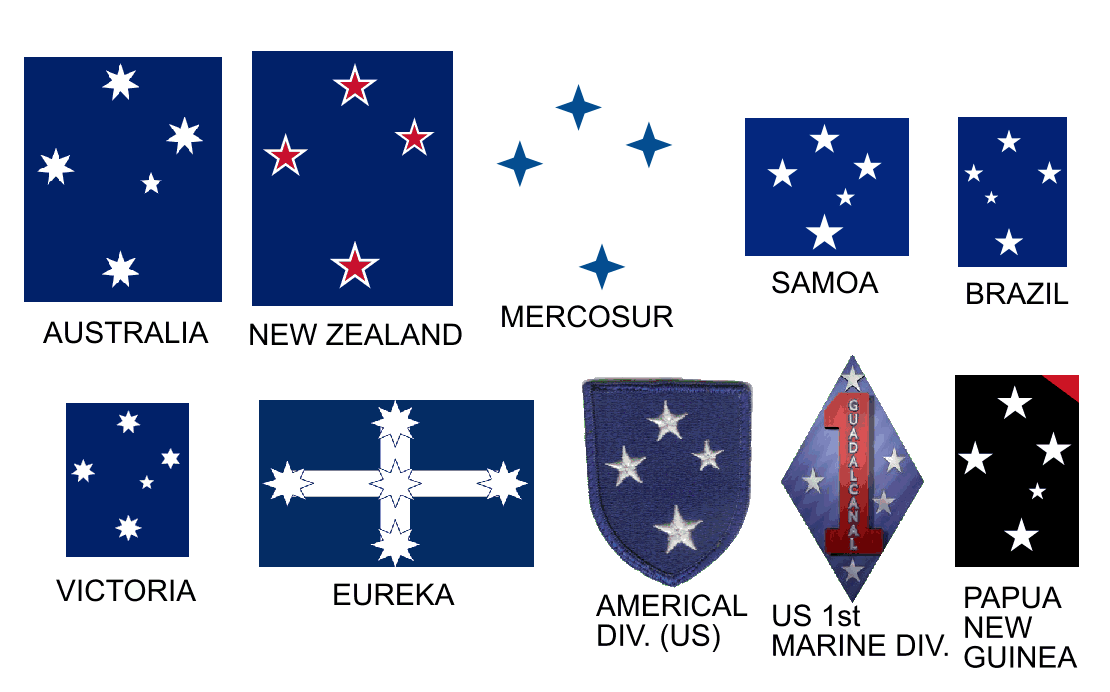
The Southern Cross, which forms the basis of Cruzeiro's emblem

The earliest design was a lozenge divided between green and red, with a white circle at its center containing the initials PI; subsequent versions incorporated the initials SSPI, for Società Sportiva Palestra Itália, and variations of the same green, red, white and gold elements.

The club adopted an entirely new emblem when it became Cruzeiro Esporte Clube in 1942. Its central symbol became the five stars of the Southern Cross (Cruzeiro do Sul), the constellation from which the club took its new name and which also appears on the flag of Brazil. The first Cruzeiro emblem placed the constellation inside a blue circle bordered in white, with the club's name surrounding the stars. In 1959, their arrangement was altered to more accurately represent the constellation as observed from Earth, while further refinements were made to the shape and positioning of the stars in 1996.

The five stars have also developed into a visual mark independent of the circular crest. Cruzeiro began displaying the stars without the surrounding badge on its shirts in 1959, and the standalone constellation has appeared repeatedly on the club's uniforms since then. Both forms are officially recognized: the club's regulations define the crest as the Southern Cross within a blue circle surrounded by a white ring bearing the words Cruzeiro Esporte Clube, while separately identifying the five-star constellation as one of the club's protected symbols and permitting either the crest or the standalone stars on its uniforms.

Following the Triple Crown of the Campeonato Mineiro, Copa do Brasil and Campeonato Brasileiro in 2003, Cruzeiro began displaying a crown above the crest in 2004; variants of the badge also incorporated representations of the club's two Copa Libertadores trophies. As part of a standardized visual identity introduced for the club's centenary in 2021, the crown was removed from the primary crest and its blue was standardized as Pantone 286 CVC, bringing the emblem into conformity with the club's statutes. The crown and other commemorative honors remain permitted as secondary applications but are not part of the official primary crest.

Evolution of the club's crest
1921	1927	1942	1959	1961	1996	2003	2016	2021

=== Nicknames ===
Cruzeiro is commonly known as the Raposa ("Fox"), after its traditional mascot. The fox was created during the 1940s by cartoonist Fernando Pieruccetti, known as Mangabeira, who also designed mascots for other Belo Horizonte clubs. Pieruccetti based the character on then-president Mário Grosso (1942–1947), whose reputation for astuteness, speed and skill in player negotiations was compared to traits conventionally associated with a fox. The fox imagery also extends to the names of the club's training grounds, Toca da Raposa I and Toca da Raposa II ("Fox's Den"), and to the academy designation Crias da Toca used for Cruzeiro-developed players.

Supporters and the club also widely use Cabuloso as an affectionate epithet. The nickname originated among Cruzeiro supporters in the mid-2010s and is generally credited to supporter and broadcaster Diogo Medeiros, who began using the phrase Cruzeiro é cabuloso ("Cruzeiro is cabuloso") in supporter videos and social-media posts around 2014–15. The expression subsequently spread among the wider fanbase and Brazilian sports media before being incorporated into the club's own marketing and matchday identity.

Raposa mascot

In South American competition, Cruzeiro has long been associated with the Spanish epithet La Bestia Negra ("The Black Beast"), a name linked to the club's record against continental opponents, particularly during the 1980s and 1990s. Accounts tracing the expression identify the Paraguayan press as an early source of the nickname, which was subsequently adopted by Cruzeiro supporters and, in 2018, by the club itself for marketing connected with the Copa Libertadores.

Other epithets used by supporters, the media and the club itself include Celeste ("Celestial"), a longstanding designation for Cruzeiro; Maior de Minas ("The Greatest in Minas"), used prominently in official club branding; and Rei de Copas ("King of Cups"), associated with Cruzeiro's record six Copa do Brasil titles and its wider history of success in cup competitions.

=== Other ===
Cruzeiro's official flag is blue with the club crest centered on the field. The club's regulations prescribe proportions of 158 by 115 centimeters, scalable to other sizes, and recognize the flag (pavilhão) as one of Cruzeiro's official symbols.

The club anthem, Hino ao Campeão Cruzeiro Esporte Clube, was composed by musician Jadir Ambrósio. It was selected in 1965 through a competition organized by Rádio Inconfidência to choose a musical symbol for the club and subsequently became Cruzeiro's official anthem.

The club introduced its costumed mascots Raposão and Raposinho in 2003, the year of Cruzeiro's Triple Crown; both became regular fixtures at home matches. In 2020, Cruzeiro added Raposona Salomé, named in honor of prominent supporter Maria Salomé de Souza, known as Dona Salomé; the character incorporates features associated with her, including blonde hair, blue glasses and the small fox doll she carried to matches.

Cruzeiro recognizes São Sebastião as its patron saint and traditionally marks the club's anniversary with a Mass at the Igreja São Sebastião in Barro Preto.

Collective prayer has also been a recurring part of Cruzeiro's team culture, with players gathering before and after matches; in Brazilian football more broadly, the pre-match ritual known as fechamento commonly brings players and coaching staff together in a circle for collective prayer.

== Supporters ==
Cruzeiro supporters are commonly known collectively as the Nação Azul ("Blue Nation"), a designation widely used by the club, players and Brazilian media. Cruzeiro's supporter base originated within the Italian immigrant community of Belo Horizonte. Historian Rodrigo Caldeira Bagni Moura has described football as an important means through which the city's immigrants reinforced a shared sense of italianità. The club soon attracted supporters beyond the Italian colony, particularly among Belo Horizonte's less affluent population. Restrictions linking membership to the Italian community were removed in 1925, accelerating that transition. The relationship between club and supporters was initially particularly close: the first stadium at Barro Preto was built partly through volunteer labor, and in the amateur era players and supporters sometimes traveled to matches together on foot or by tram.

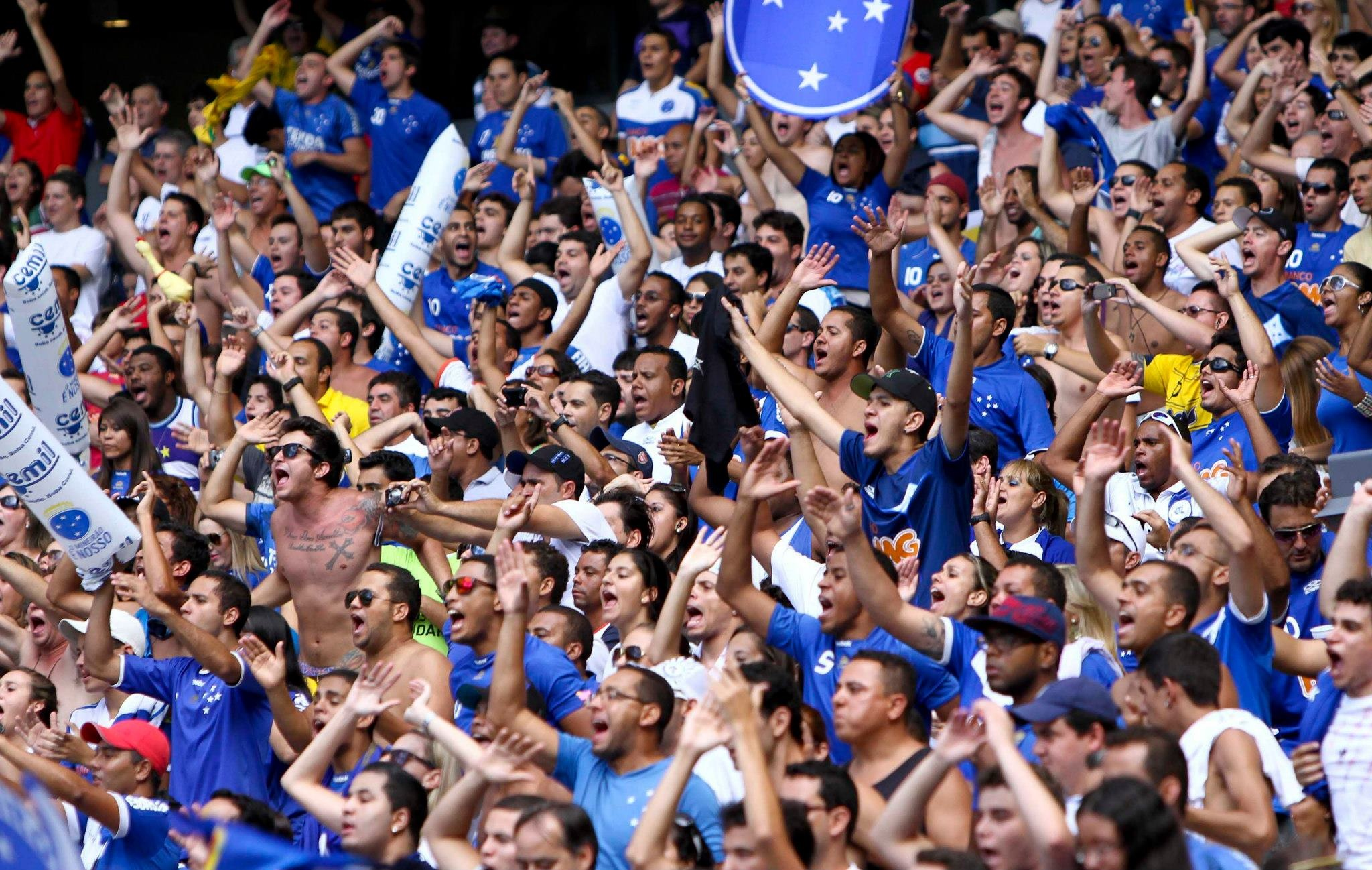
Cruzeiro supporters in Belo Horizonte.

Cruzeiro's expansion beyond Belo Horizonte accelerated after World War II. Between 1946 and 1958, the club played 89 friendlies in 45 cities across the interior of Minas Gerais, while under president Felício Brandi (1961–1982) it also sought younger supporters through visits to schools and nurseries. Success during the 1960s and 1970s further expanded the club's following throughout the state. A 2021 DataTempo survey found Cruzeiro to be the most-supported club in Minas Gerais, with 26.51% of respondents, ahead of Atlético Mineiro at 19.97% and Flamengo at 11.85%; Cruzeiro led in nearly every surveyed region outside Belo Horizonte.

Recent national surveys have generally placed Cruzeiro between fifth and seventh among Brazilian clubs, ranking as the largest supporter base outside the traditional Rio de Janeiro and São Paulo axis. Datafolha recorded 3% national support in 2024 and 4% in 2026; AtlasIntel placed Cruzeiro joint fifth nationally with Vasco da Gama at 6.0% in 2025, while Ipsos-Ipec and a Nexus survey commissioned by the CBF placed it seventh and joint sixth, respectively. Across these five surveys, Cruzeiro was the highest-ranked club from Minas Gerais in four and tied Atlético Mineiro on percentage in the fifth. In AtlasIntel's 2023 regional breakdown, Cruzeiro was the third-most-supported club in the country when only home region was considered, behind only Corinthians and Flamengo.

The size of the following has also been reflected in stadium attendance. Cruzeiro led the national championship in average attendance during the 1967, 1969, 1998, 2003, 2013 and 2014 seasons. A historical study covering national competitions from 1967 through 2019 calculated an average of 21,360 paying spectators at Cruzeiro home matches, the fifth-highest among Brazilian clubs during the period. During the promotion-winning 2022 Série B campaign, Cruzeiro averaged more than 43,000 spectators per home match, an all-time competition record, and drew more than one million spectators across 28 home matches in all competitions. In 2025, Cruzeiro averaged 40,158 paying spectators in Série A, the second-highest figure in the competition.

Supporter culture developed alongside the club's expansion. Rezende and Leonel Júnior document the Trem da Vitória ("Victory Train"), through which special trains carried supporters to away matches from the 1940s into the early 1960s. During the early Mineirão era, broadcaster and Cruzeiro supporter Aldair Pinto led a charanga, or stadium brass-and-percussion band, which became part of derby matchdays. Organized supporter groups subsequently became prominent on the terraces; the largest, Máfia Azul, was founded in 1977. Máfia Azul is part of the Punho Cruzado ("Crossed Fist") alliance of organized supporter groups, historically linking it with Torcida Jovem do Flamengo, Independente of São Paulo and Camisa 12 of Internacional. Large blue-and-white flags, banners and choreographed displays remain characteristic of Cruzeiro home matches.

A more recent ritual is the synchronized "Viking clap", in which supporters and players clap above their heads in unison. The celebration was proposed by supporters and first performed with the team after a 2018 Copa Libertadores match against Flamengo; it subsequently became a recurring post-match ritual and was particularly prominent during the 2022 promotion campaign.

Prominent public figures identified as Cruzeiro supporters include former Brazilian president Juscelino Kubitschek, poet Carlos Drummond de Andrade, musicians Milton Nascimento, Samuel Rosa, Fernanda Takai and Gusttavo Lima, and priest and singer Fábio de Melo.

Cruzeiro's supporter-membership program, Sócio 5 Estrelas, had 88,096 members in good standing as of 30 January 2026.

== Rivalries ==
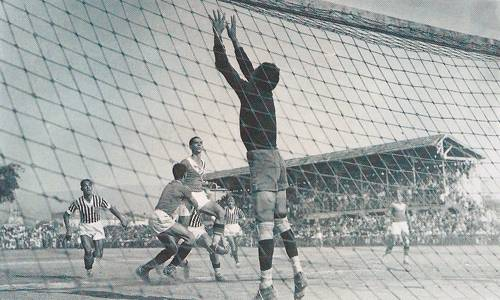
Cruzeiro goalkeeper Geraldo II during a Clássico Mineiro in the 1940s.

Cruzeiro's principal rivalry is with fellow Belo Horizonte club Atlético Mineiro, with whom it contests the Clássico Mineiro. The clubs first met on 17 April 1921, three months after the foundation of Palestra Itália, with Palestra winning 3–0 at the Prado Mineiro. The fixture did not immediately become the state's dominant rivalry: Atlético and América Mineiro were the leading clubs of Belo Horizonte's early football culture. The Atlético–Palestra rivalry developed gradually through competition for titles, growing supporter identities and extensive press attention during the 1920s and 1930s.

As América's dominance declined, Cruzeiro and Atlético became the principal competitors for the Campeonato Mineiro, and by the 1940s the fixture had emerged as the state's leading rivalry. Its prominence increased further after the opening of the Mineirão in 1965 and the national successes of both clubs during the following decades. A 1969 meeting drew 123,351 paying spectators; ten editions of the derby attracted more than 100,000 paying spectators.

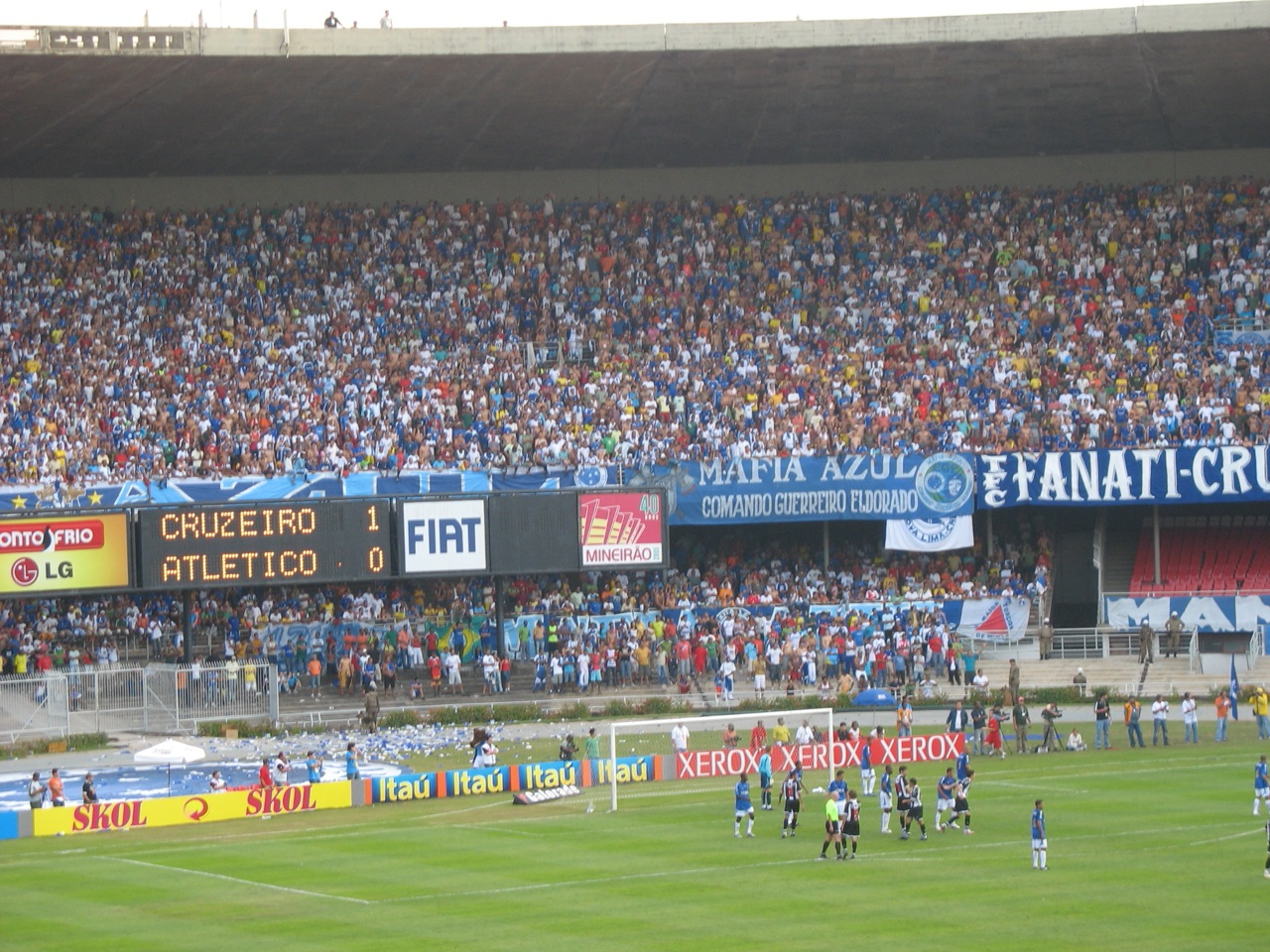
The Mineirão during Cruzeiro's 4–2 victory over Atlético Mineiro on 24 June 2007.

The clubs have decided numerous state championships and first met in a national final in the 2014 Copa do Brasil, which Atlético won. Even the historical statistics of the derby are contested, with the clubs maintaining different counts of matches and results.

In a 2026 survey of 50 journalists, commentators and broadcasters from ge and its affiliates, Atlético–Cruzeiro ranked third among Brazilian derbies and was named among the country's three largest by 24 respondents. Internationally, Goal included the fixture in its 2018 feature on 80 of world football's major rivalries, while Bleacher Report placed it 18th in a 2015 ranking of the 20 largest rivalries in South American football.

Cruzeiro also maintains a longstanding rivalry with América Mineiro. Their first meeting in 1921 ended in a 2–0 América victory, and the clubs have contested several significant finals. América defeated Palestra for the 1922 Campeonato Mineiro, Cruzeiro won their 1992 state championship final, and América won both legs of the inaugural Copa Sul-Minas final in 2000.

A further historic rivalry exists with Villa Nova of Nova Lima. The clubs first met in 1921 and have faced one another predominantly in the Campeonato Mineiro. Their most prominent meeting came in the 1997 Campeonato Mineiro final, when Cruzeiro won the deciding match 1–0 before 132,834 spectators at the Mineirão—the largest total attendance recorded at the stadium.

== Players ==
=== Current squad ===
As of 12 September 2026

Note: Flags indicate national team as defined under FIFA eligibility rules; some limited exceptions apply. Players may hold more than one non-FIFA nationality.

No.	Pos.	Nation	Player
1	GK	BRA	Cássio
2	DF	BRA	Kauã Moraes
5	MF	BRA	Zé Lucas
6	DF	URU	Matías Viña (on loan from Flamengo)
7	MF	BRA	Matheus Henrique
8	MF	BRA	Gerson
9	FW	BRA	Bruno Rodrigues (on loan from Palmeiras)
10	MF	BRA	Matheus Pereira
11	FW	BRA	Marquinhos
12	DF	BRA	William
15	DF	BRA	Fabrício Bruno
16	MF	BRA	Lucas Silva (captain)
17	FW	COL	Luis Sinisterra
19	FW	BRA	Kaio Jorge
20	FW	BRA	Wesley (on loan from Al Nassr)
22	FW	COL	Néiser Villarreal
23	DF	BRA	Fagner

No.	Pos.	Nation	Player
24	GK	BRA	Marcelo Eráclito
25	DF	ARG	Lucas Villalba
27	DF	ARG	Gabriel Rojas
29	MF	ARG	Lucas Romero (vice-captain)
34	DF	BRA	Jonathan Jesus
40	MF	BRA	Rhuan Gabriel
41	GK	BRA	Léo Aragão
43	DF	BRA	João Marcelo
51	GK	BRA	Vitor Lamounier
57	FW	BRA	Rayan Lelis
67	FW	POR	João Costa (on loan from Al-Ettifaq)
70	FW	BRA	Kaique Kenji
77	FW	BRA	Gabriel Pec
81	GK	BRA	Otávio
94	FW	BEL	Wanderson
97	FW	URU	Luciano Rodríguez (on loan from Neom)
99	FW	ECU	Keny Arroyo

==== Youth team ====
Note: Flags indicate national team as defined under FIFA eligibility rules; some limited exceptions apply. Players may hold more than one non-FIFA nationality.

No.	Pos.	Nation	Player
38	MF	BRA	Felipe Morais
42	MF	BRA	Nicolas
58	MF	BRA	Eduardo Pape

No.	Pos.	Nation	Player
60	DF	BRA	Gustavinho
84	DF	BRA	Kelvin
—	GK	BRA	Felipe Teixeira

==== Other players under contract ====
Note: Flags indicate national team as defined under FIFA eligibility rules; some limited exceptions apply. Players may hold more than one non-FIFA nationality.

No.	Pos.	Nation	Player
—	MF	PAR	Fabrizio Peralta

==== Out on loan ====
Note: Flags indicate national team as defined under FIFA eligibility rules; some limited exceptions apply. Players may hold more than one non-FIFA nationality.

No.	Pos.	Nation	Player
—	GK	BRA	Matheus Cunha (at Internacional until 30 June 2027)
—	DF	BRA	Bruno Alves (at Norwich until 30 June 2027)
—	MF	BRA	Japa (at Mirassol until 31 December 2026)
—	MF	BRA	Murilo Rhikman (at Sport Recife until 30 November 2026)
—	MF	BRA	Walace (at Vitória until 31 December 2026)
—	FW	BRA	Chico da Costa (at Fortaleza until 30 November 2026)

No.	Pos.	Nation	Player
—	FW	ARG	Lautaro Díaz (at Racing until 30 June 2027)
—	FW	BRA	Gabriel Barbosa (at Santos until 31 December 2026)
—	FW	BRA	Gui Meira (at Feirense until 30 June 2027)
—	FW	BRA	Rodriguinho (at Fortaleza until 30 November 2026)
—	FW	BRA	Ruan Índio (at Radomiak Radom until 30 June 2026)
—	FW	BRA	Tevis (at Yokohama Marinos until 31 December 2026)

=== Notable players ===
Early notable figures from the Palestra Itália era included Ninão, Niginho and Bengala, while the generation that established Cruzeiro as a national power in the 1960s included Tostão, Dirceu Lopes, Piazza, Raul and Zé Carlos. Tostão is widely regarded as the club's greatest player. The club's first Copa Libertadores-winning generation in the 1970s also featured Nelinho, Joãozinho, Palhinha and Argentina international Roberto Perfumo.

Prominent players during Cruzeiro's resurgence in the 1990s included Dida, Nonato, Ricardinho and Marcelo Ramos. The decade also saw the professional debut of academy product Ronaldo, who later became a two-time Ballon d'Or winner, in 1997 and 2002. In the 2000s, Alex led the 2003 Triple Crown side and has frequently been singled out as Cruzeiro's greatest player of the 21st century.

The title-winning teams of the 2010s included Fábio, Everton Ribeiro, Ricardo Goulart, Lucas Silva and Uruguay international Giorgian de Arrascaeta. Fábio made 976 appearances for Cruzeiro before joining Fluminense; in 2025, he surpassed Peter Shilton for the most recorded appearances in professional football and was subsequently recognized by Guinness World Records.

Other prominent foreign internationals to represent Cruzeiro have included Juan Pablo Sorín, Walter Montillo, Marcelo Moreno and Claudio Maldonado.

== Coaches ==
=== Current ===
Position	Name	Nationality
Head coach	Artur Jorge	POR
Assistant coaches	João Cardoso	POR
Assistant coaches	André Cunha	POR
Assistant coaches	Wesley Carvalho	BRA
Goalkeeping coaches	João Paulo Lacerda	BRA
Goalkeeping coaches	Robertinho	BRA
Fitness coach	Tiago Lopes	POR
Performance coordinator	Nathália Arnosti	BRA
Performance analyst	Rodrigo Mira	POR
show more
Physical preparation coordinator	Gustavo Shiroma	BRA
Return-to-play and fitness coach	Tabaré Papariello	URU
Head doctor	Sérgio Campolina	BRA
Doctors	Rodrigo Vaz	BRA
Doctors	Thiago Daniel	BRA
Physiotherapist	Jomar Ottoni	BRA
show less

=== Former ===
Since 1928, Cruzeiro has had 166 managerial spells involving 99 different managers, including 12 interim appointments held by seven individuals; 95 managers have served on a permanent basis, with 89 of the 99 being Brazilian. The club was managed by a player commission from its foundation in 1921 until the appointment of its first named manager in 1928. Ilton Chaves holds the club record for matches managed, with 389 across six spells, while Matturio Fabbi's 1,361-day tenure from 1928 to 1931 is the longest uninterrupted managerial spell in Cruzeiro's history.

Several managers have led Cruzeiro through its principal title-winning periods. Airton Moreira coached the side that defeated Pelé's Santos to win the 1966 Taça Brasil, the club's first national title, while his brother Zezé Moreira led Cruzeiro to its first Copa Libertadores championship in 1976. Paulo Autuori was in charge when Cruzeiro won its second Libertadores in 1997.

In the 21st century, Luiz Felipe Scolari won the 2001 Copa Sul-Minas during his first spell at Cruzeiro before leaving in June 2001 to become head coach of the Brazil national team, which he led to victory at the 2002 FIFA World Cup. Vanderlei Luxemburgo coached the 2003 team that won the Campeonato Mineiro, Copa do Brasil and Campeonato Brasileiro, while Marcelo Oliveira led Cruzeiro to consecutive Brazilian league championships in 2013 and 2014. Mano Menezes later won consecutive Copa do Brasil titles in 2017 and 2018, as well as the Campeonato Mineiro in 2018 and 2019.

Complete list of Cruzeiro managers (1921–present)
Manager	Tenure	Manager	Tenure	Manager	Tenure
Player commission	1921–1928	(Brazil) Yustrich	1977	(Brazil) Paulo Autuori	1999–2000
(Brazil) Matturio Fabbi	1928–1932	(Brazil) Antônio Lacerda Filho	1977	(Brazil) Marco Aurélio	2000
(Brazil) Rizzo	1932	(Brazil) Aymoré Moreira	1977–1978	(Brazil) Luiz Felipe Scolari	2000–2001
(Brazil) Matturio Fabbi	1933–1936	(Brazil) Procópio Cardoso	1978	(Brazil) Paulo César Carpegiani	2001
(Brazil) Nello Nicolai	1936–1937	(Brazil) João Francisco	1978	(Brazil) Ivo Wortmann	2001
(Brazil) Ninão	1937	(Brazil) Zé Duarte	1978–1979	(Brazil) Marco Aurélio	2001–2002
(Brazil) Matturio Fabbi	1938	(Brazil) Barbatana	1979	(Brazil) Ney Franco (interim)	2002
(Brazil) Matturio Fabbi	1939	(Brazil) Ilton Chaves	1979–1980	(Brazil) Vanderlei Luxemburgo	2002–2004
(Brazil) Bengala	1939–1943	(Brazil) Tim	1980	(Brazil) Paulo César Gusmão	2004
(Brazil) Ninão	1943–1944	(Brazil) Procópio Cardoso	1981	(Brazil) Ney Franco (interim)	2004
(Brazil) Bengala	1944	(Brazil) Cláudio Garcia	1981	(Brazil) Emerson Leão	2004
(Brazil) Chico Trindade	1944–1946	(Brazil) Didi	1981–1982	(Brazil) Ney Franco (interim)	2004
(Brazil) Nello Nicolai	1946	(Brazil) Yustrich	1982	(Brazil) Marco Aurélio	2004
(Brazil) Américo Tunes	1946	(Brazil) Orlando Fantoni	1983	(Brazil) Ney Franco (interim)	2004
(Brazil) Bengala	1946–1947	(Brazil) Ilton Chaves	1983–1984	(Brazil) Levir Culpi	2005
(Brazil) Fumanchu	1947–1948	(Brazil) Oswaldo Brandão	1984	(Brazil) Paulo César Gusmão	2005–2006
(Brazil) Niginho	1948–1949	(Brazil) João Francisco	1984–1985	(Brazil) Oswaldo de Oliveira	2006
(Brazil) Souza	1950–1951	(Brazil) Moraes	1985	(Brazil) Paulo Autuori	2007
(Brazil) Juvenal Pereira	1951	(Brazil) Procópio Cardoso	1986	(Brazil) Emerson Ávila (interim)	2007
(Brazil) Cristóvão Colombo	1952	(Brazil) Jair Bala	1986	(Brazil) Dorival Júnior	2007
(Uruguay) Ricardo Díez	1953	(Brazil) Carlos Alberto Silva	1986–1987	(Brazil) Adílson Batista	2008–2010
(Brazil) Cristóvão Colombo	1953	(Brazil) Rui Guimarães	1987	(Brazil) Emerson Ávila (interim)	2010
(Brazil) Niginho	1953–1955	(Brazil) João Avelino "71"	1987	(Brazil) Cuca	2010–2011
(Argentina) Filpo Núñez	1955	(Brazil) Raul Plassmann	1987	(Brazil) Joel Santana	2011
(Brazil) Bengala	1955–1956	(Brazil) Paulinho de Almeida	1987	(Brazil) Emerson Ávila (interim)	2011
(Brazil) Artur Nequessaurt	1956	(Brazil) Jair Pereira	1987–1988	(Brazil) Vágner Mancini	2011–2012
(Brazil) Ayrton Moreira	1957	(Brazil) Carlos Alberto Silva	1988	(Brazil) Celso Roth	2012
(Brazil) Gérson dos Santos	1957	(Brazil) Rui Guimarães	1988	(Brazil) Marcelo Oliveira	2013–2015
(Brazil) Cristóvão Colombo	1957	(Brazil) Antônio Lacerda Filho	1988	(Brazil) Vanderlei Luxemburgo	2015
(Brazil) Artur Nequessaurt	1958	(Brazil) Chico Formiga	1988	(Brazil) Mano Menezes	2015
(Brazil) Danilo Alvim	1958	(Brazil) Ênio Andrade	1989	(Brazil) Deivid	2015–2016
(Brazil) Gérson dos Santos	1958–1959	(Brazil) Carlos Alberto Silva	1989	(Portugal) Paulo Bento	2016
(Brazil) Ninão	1959	(Brazil) João Francisco	1989	(Brazil) Mano Menezes	2016–2019
(Brazil) Niginho	1959–1961	(Brazil) Antônio Lacerda Filho	1989	(Brazil) Rogério Ceni	2019
(Brazil) Gérson dos Santos	1962	(Brazil) Ênio Andrade	1990	(Brazil) Abel Braga	2019
(Brazil) Geninho	1962	(Brazil) José Luiz Carbone	1990	(Brazil) Adílson Batista	2019–2020
(Brazil) Gilson Santana	1962	(Brazil) Duque	1990	(Brazil) Enderson Moreira	2020
(Brazil) Niginho	1962–1963	(Brazil) Evaristo de Macedo	1991	(Brazil) Ney Franco	2020
(Brazil) Martim Francisco	1963	(Brazil) Ênio Andrade	1991–1992	(Brazil) Luiz Felipe Scolari	2020
(Brazil) Adelino	1964	(Brazil) Jair Pereira	1992	(Brazil) Célio Lúcio (interim)	2020
(Brazil) Marão	1964	(Brazil) Carlos Alberto Silva	1993	(Brazil) Felipe Conceição	2021
(Brazil) Ayrton Moreira	1964–1967	(Brazil) Pinheiro	1993	(Brazil) Mozart Santos	2021
(Brazil) Orlando Fantoni	1967–1968	(Brazil) Zé Maurício (interim)	1993	(Brazil) Vanderlei Luxemburgo	2021
(Brazil) Ilton Chaves	1968–1969	(Brazil) Nelinho	1994	(Uruguay) Paulo Pezzolano	2022–2023
(Brazil) Gérson dos Santos	1969–1970	(Brazil) Ênio Andrade	1994	(Portugal) Pepa	2023
(Brazil) Ilton Chaves	1970	(Brazil) Palhinha	1994	(Brazil) Fernando Seabra (interim)	2023
(Argentina) Filpo Núñez	1970	(Brazil) Antônio Lopes	1995	(Brazil) Zé Ricardo	2023
(Brazil) Ilton Chaves	1970–1971	(Brazil) Carlos Alberto Silva	1995	(Brazil) Paulo Autuori (interim)	2023
(Brazil) João Crispim	1971	(Brazil) Ênio Andrade	1995	(Argentina) Nicolás Larcamón	2023–2024
(Brazil) Orlando Fantoni	1971–1972	(Brazil) Jair Pereira	1995	(Brazil) Fernando Seabra	2024
(Brazil) Yustrich	1972	(Brazil) Levir Culpi	1996	(Brazil) Fernando Diniz	2024–2025
(Brazil) Brito	1972	(Brazil) Oscar Bernardi	1997	(Portugal) Leonardo Jardim	2025
(Brazil) Ilton Chaves	1972–1975	(Brazil) Paulo Autuori	1997	(Brazil) Tite	2025–2026
(Brazil) Antônio Lacerda Filho	1975	(Brazil) Wantuil Rodrigues	1997	(Brazil) Wesley Carvalho (interim)	2026
(Brazil) Moacir Rodrigues	1975	(Brazil) Nelsinho Baptista	1997	(Portugal) Artur Jorge	2026–
(Brazil) Zezé Moreira	1975–1977	(Brazil) Levir Culpi	1998–1999		

Interim managers are shaded blue and explicitly marked interim. Cruzeiro was managed by a player commission from 1921 to 1928 before appointing its first named manager.

== Records and statistics ==
Cruzeiro holds several notable records and distinctions in Brazilian football. The IFFHS ranked Cruzeiro as the greatest Brazilian club of the 20th century. In 2003, the club became the first champion of the Campeonato Brasileiro following the adoption of the round-robin format, finishing the 46-match season with 100 points, 31 victories and 102 goals; it remains the only Brazilian club to have reached 100 points in a top-flight season. The same season, Cruzeiro became the first Brazilian club to win its state championship, the Copa do Brasil and the national league in the same year, completing the Tríplice Coroa ("Triple Crown"). A decade later, the 2013 team became the first champion of the round-robin era to defeat every other club in the league at least once during the same season. Goalkeeper Fábio, Cruzeiro's record appearance holder with 976 matches, later surpassed Peter Shilton for the most competitive appearances in men's football; 976 of Fábio's first 1,391 competitive appearances were for Cruzeiro. Cruzeiro is also associated with the largest attendance in the history of the Mineirão, where 132,834 spectators attended the 1997 Campeonato Mineiro final against Villa Nova. Earlier in the club's history, Ninão became the first player in Brazilian football to score ten goals in a single match, doing so in Palestra Itália's 14–0 victory over Alves Nogueira on 17 June 1928.

- First goal – Nani Lazzarotti scored the first goal in Cruzeiro's history on 3 April 1921, opening the scoring in Palestra Itália's first match, a 2–0 victory over a combined team from Nova Lima. He also scored the second goal.
- Largest victory – 14–0 against Alves Nogueira in the Campeonato da Cidade on 17 June 1928.
- Largest defeat – 2–9 against Atlético Mineiro in the Campeonato da Cidade on 27 November 1927.
- Largest Campeonato Brasileiro victory – 7–0 away to Bahia on 14 December 2003. Alex scored five goals, with Felipe Melo and Mota scoring the other two.
- Largest victory in international competition – 8–0 against Atlético Nacional in the 1992 Supercopa Libertadores on 16 October 1992; Renato Gaúcho scored five goals.
- Highest attendance – 132,834 against Villa Nova in the Campeonato Mineiro final at the Mineirão on 22 June 1997, the stadium's all-time attendance record.
- Intercontinental Cup attendance – The second leg of the 1976 Intercontinental Cup against Bayern Munich drew 117,000 spectators at the Mineirão.
- Most appearances – 976, Fábio (2000; 2005–2021).
- Most goals – Tostão, the club's all-time leading scorer. Historical sources differ slightly on his total: ge records 242 goals in 383 appearances, while the Brazilian Football Confederation credits him with 245 in the same number of matches.
- Most goals in a match – 10, Ninão, in the 14–0 victory over Alves Nogueira on 17 June 1928.
- Most matches as manager – 389, Ílton Chaves, across six spells with the club.
- Longest uninterrupted managerial tenure – Matturio Fabbi, 1,361 consecutive days from 1928 to 1931.
- Record transfer fee paid – €27 million (approximately R$168–170 million) to Zenit Saint Petersburg for Gerson in January 2026, with a further €3 million available in performance-related bonuses.
- Record transfer fee received – €14 million fixed (approximately R$82.6 million) from Como for Kaiki in 2026, with a further €1 million available in bonuses; measured in nominal Brazilian reais, it was the largest outgoing transfer fee received by Cruzeiro. (Note: When historical fees are adjusted for Brazilian inflation, Geovanni's 2001 transfer to Barcelona remains Cruzeiro's largest sale. The US$18 million fee was worth R$42.7 million at the time and approximately R$190.5 million in May 2026 after adjustment by the IPCA.)

== Honors ==
Continental
Competitions	Titles	Seasons
Copa Libertadores	2	1976, 1997
Supercopa Libertadores	2	1991, 1992
Recopa Sudamericana	1	1998
Copa Ouro	1^{s}	1995
Copa Master de Supercopa	1^{s}	1995
National
Competitions	Titles	Seasons
Campeonato Brasileiro Série A	4	1966, 2003, 2013, 2014
Copa do Brasil	6	1993, 1996, 2000, 2003, 2017, 2018
Campeonato Brasileiro Série B	1	2022
Regional
Competitions	Titles	Seasons
Copa Sul-Minas	2	2001, 2002
Copa Centro-Oeste	1	1999
State
Competitions	Titles	Seasons
Campeonato Mineiro	39	1928, 1929, 1930, 1940, 1943, 1944, 1945, 1956, 1959, 1960, 1961, 1965, 1966, 1967, 1968, 1969, 1972, 1973, 1974, 1975, 1977, 1984, 1987, 1990, 1992, 1994, 1996, 1997, 1998, 2003, 2004, 2006, 2008, 2009, 2011, 2014, 2018, 2019, 2026
Supercampeonato Mineiro	1	2002
Taça Minas Gerais	5^{s}	1973, 1982, 1983, 1984, 1985

- record
- ^{s} shared record

== Grounds ==
Home grounds
Period	Ground
Principal grounds
1921–1923	Prado Mineiro
1923–1965	Estádio Juscelino Kubitschek
1965–present	Mineirão
Temporary and alternative grounds: Period / Ground; 1953–1965; 2012; 2023 / Independência; 2010–2013; 2023 / Arena do Jacaré; 2010–2012; 2023 / Parque do Sabiá; 2010–2012 / Ipatingão; 2012 / Melão; 2012 / Arena do Calçado; 2023 / Kleber Andrade

Cruzeiro played its earliest home matches at the Prado Mineiro, then one of the principal football grounds in Belo Horizonte. In 1923, the club opened its own ground in the Barro Preto neighborhood. The stadium, later known as the Estádio Juscelino Kubitschek, remained Cruzeiro's principal home until the opening of the Mineirão in 1965. It continued to be used for training and matches involving reserve and youth teams before being demolished in the 1980s; the site subsequently became part of the club's sporting complex.

Since 1965, Cruzeiro's principal home ground has been the Mineirão, officially the Estádio Governador Magalhães Pinto, in the Pampulha district of Belo Horizonte. The stadium is owned by the state of Minas Gerais and operated by Minas Arena through a public–private partnership. It was closed from June 2010 until December 2012 for a major redevelopment ahead of the 2013 FIFA Confederations Cup and 2014 FIFA World Cup. Cruzeiro subsequently returned to the stadium, which has remained the club's primary home venue. Under a five-year agreement signed with Minas Arena in January 2026, Cruzeiro is designated the Mineirão's principal user through the end of 2030. The stadium's record attendance was set on 22 June 1997, when 132,834 spectators attended Cruzeiro's victory over Villa Nova in the Campeonato Mineiro final.

Cruzeiro supporters at the Mineirão in 2015.

Cruzeiro has periodically explored establishing a stadium under its own control. During the presidency of Alvimar de Oliveira Costa, the club advanced plans in 2007 for a multipurpose arena backed by Portuguese investors, seeking municipal assistance to identify a suitable site near Belo Horizonte; the proposal did not reach construction. The issue resurfaced under Ronaldo's SAF administration in 2022, when Cruzeiro studied a proposed 45,000–50,000-seat arena in Betim, financed by private investors on municipal land, and signed a letter of intent to assess the project's viability; the proposal ultimately did not proceed. After acquiring control of the SAF in 2024, Pedro Lourenço ruled out constructing a new stadium and instead stated that the club would seek a greater role in the future administration of the Mineirão.

Cruzeiro also operates two principal football training centers in Belo Horizonte, known as Toca da Raposa I and Toca da Raposa II. Toca da Raposa I opened on 3 February 1973 and initially served as the training base of the senior team. After the opening of Toca da Raposa II in 2002, it became primarily associated with the club's academy. As of 2026, Toca I is used by Cruzeiro's men's youth categories and the professional women's team, while the under-20 side uses facilities at both training centers. The complex includes natural- and artificial-grass pitches and has undergone further redevelopment to expand its accommodation and football facilities.

Toca da Raposa II was inaugurated on 9 March 2002 and became the principal training base of the men's first team. The 83,000-square-metre (21-acre) complex contains four full-size training pitches as well as accommodation, dining, medical and performance facilities. A substantial modernization program begun in 2022 included renovations to the pitches, gymnasium, medical and performance areas, dining facilities and other parts of the complex.

== Organization and finances ==
Minutes of an early Palestra Italia general assembly where statutes and members were approved, dated 19 January 1921, written in Italian.

Since 2021, Cruzeiro's professional football operations have been organized through Cruzeiro Esporte Clube – Sociedade Anônima do Futebol (Cruzeiro SAF), a Sociedade Anônima do Futebol established under Brazilian law. The SAF is 90% controlled through BPW Sports Participações, a company itself majority owned by businessman Pedro Lourenço, while the remaining 10% is held by Cruzeiro Esporte Clube, the nonprofit civil association that directly operated the football department before the SAF was created. Lourenço serves as president of the SAF, with his son Pedro Junio as vice-president and the principal executive overseeing its football operations.

With the creation of the SAF, the association president has governed the nonprofit entity rather than the professional football operation; Lidson Potsch is the current association president. The association is a legally distinct, member-based entity organized as an associação civil sem fins econômicos (nonprofit civil association). Membership is obtained separately through the association's social-club system, which offers individual and family memberships. This is distinct from Sócio 5 Estrelas, the supporter-membership program operated by Cruzeiro SAF, which primarily provides ticketing, retail and other supporter benefits. Under Brazil's SAF legislation, the shares retained by the originating association are designated Class A shares. The association's consent is required for changes to the SAF's name, crest, colors and other identifying symbols; while it retains at least 10% of the capital, its approval is also required for certain corporate reorganizations and the disposal of specified assets and intellectual property.

Cruzeiro adopted the SAF structure following a prolonged financial and governance crisis that became particularly acute in 2019. In May of that year, the Civil Police of Minas Gerais opened an investigation into alleged money laundering, document falsification and false statements involving the administration of club president Wagner Pires de Sá. Search warrants were subsequently executed at the club's headquarters, training centers and the residences of senior officials. In 2020, a court accepted a criminal complaint filed by the Public Ministry of Minas Gerais against Pires de Sá and other former officials and associates concerning alleged money laundering, misappropriation, false statements and participation in a criminal organization. The crisis coincided with Cruzeiro's first relegation from the top flight in 2019. The club's accounts for that year, the final year of Pires de Sá's presidency, recorded a deficit of R$394.1 million and total debt of R$803.5 million, while its independent auditor drew attention to uncertainty surrounding the club's ability to continue operating because of successive annual deficits.

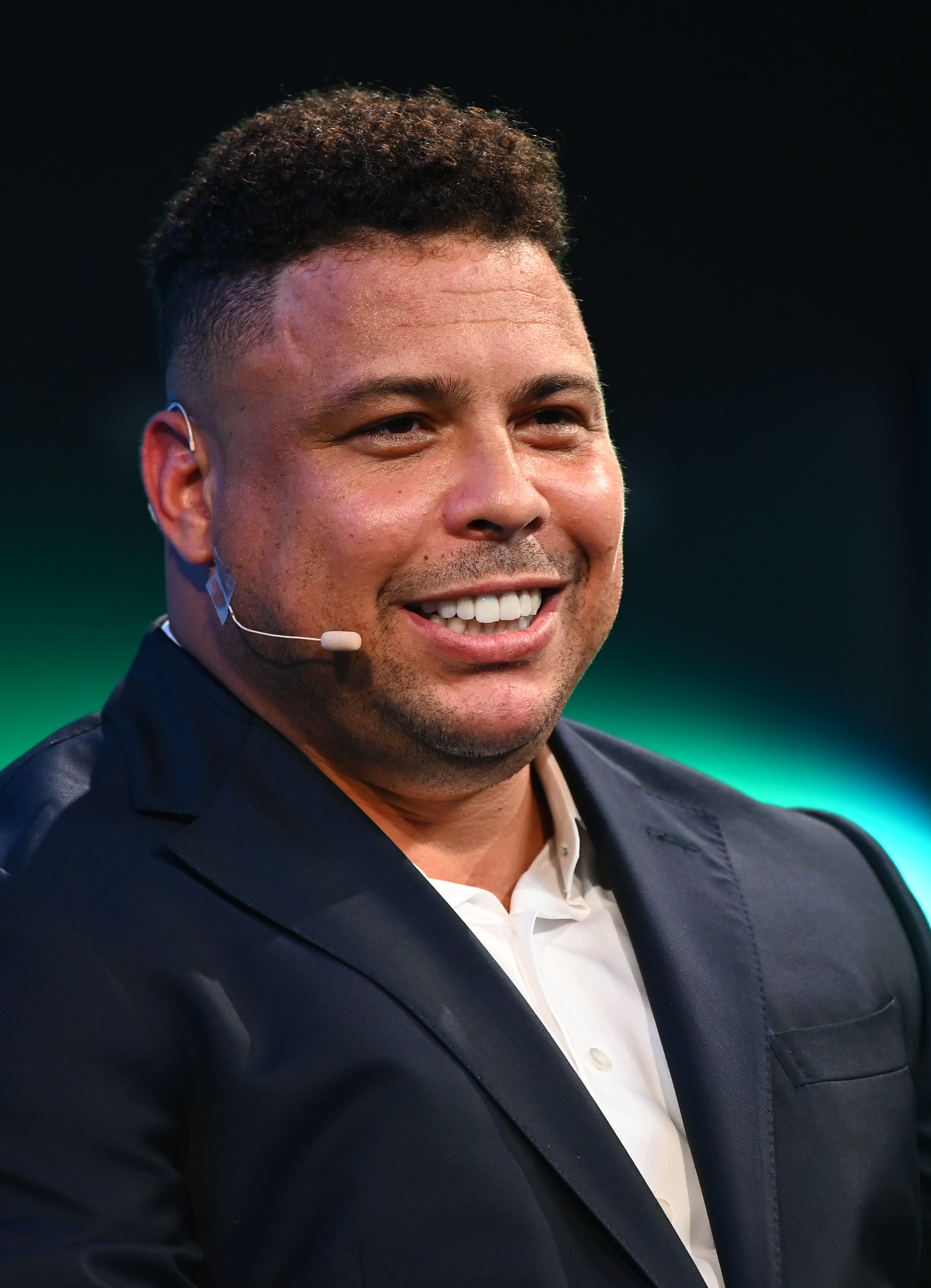
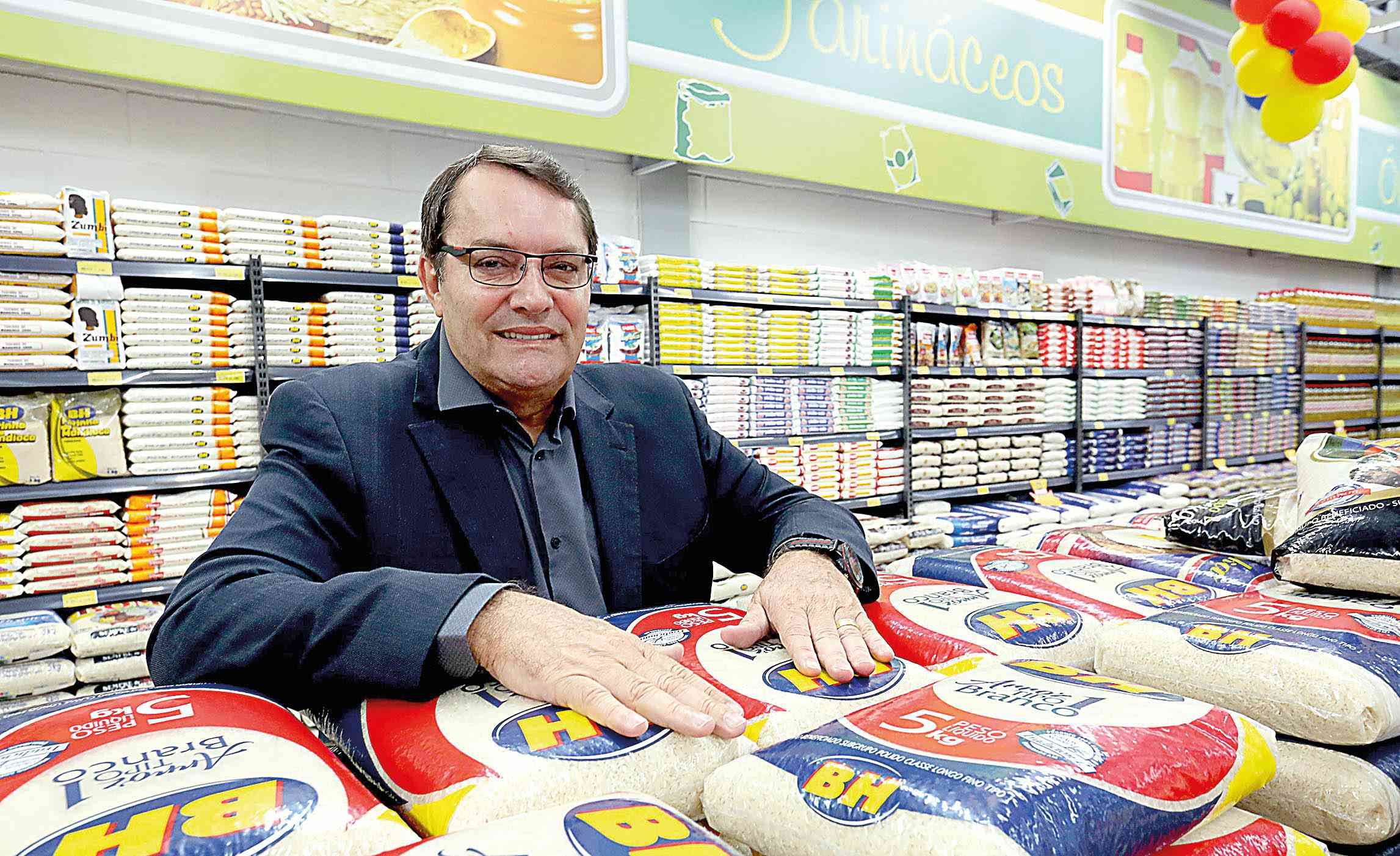
Ronaldo (top), the first owner of Cruzeiro SAF from 2022 to 2024, and Pedro Lourenço (bottom), current owner.

In December 2021, the club amended its statutes to permit the sale of up to 90% of the newly created SAF to an outside investor. The following day, former Cruzeiro player Ronaldo agreed through Tara Sports to acquire the 90% controlling interest. The definitive purchase agreement was signed in April 2022. Although the transaction had initially been publicized as a R$400 million investment, its terms required an immediate R$50 million capital contribution, with up to a further R$350 million to be fulfilled through additional investment or increases in the SAF's revenues over the following years. In the first season under Ronaldo's control, Cruzeiro won the 2022 Série B and returned to Série A after three seasons in the second division.

The creation of the SAF separated the football business from most of the association's legacy liabilities. As part of the restructuring, the association entered judicial recovery proceedings to reorganize its debts. In June 2023, creditors approved a repayment plan covering approximately R$500 million in claims, which was subsequently approved by the court in August. Responsibility for the recovery plan remained with the association, although the SAF makes payments toward the association's obligations under the restructuring arrangements.

In April 2024, Ronaldo and BPW Sports reached an agreement under which BPW would acquire Tara Sports Brasil, the company holding Ronaldo's 90% interest in Cruzeiro SAF. The transaction made Cruzeiro the first Brazilian SAF whose controlling interest was resold after its initial acquisition. Brazil's Administrative Council for Economic Defense approved the acquisition in June. The financial terms of the transaction were not publicly disclosed.

Under Lourenço, the SAF substantially increased investment in the playing squad and infrastructure. Its 2024 accounts reported approximately R$200 million in contributions by the new administration, with funds directed toward player acquisitions and improvements to the club's training centers. During 2025, the controlling shareholder provided a further R$269 million in financing, comprising R$156.3 million in advances for a future capital increase and approximately R$112.8 million in related-party financing. The SAF also recorded R$364 million in investment in players during the year.

In 2025, the first full financial year under Lourenço's control, Cruzeiro SAF reported net operating revenue of R$599.2 million, compared with R$282.7 million in 2024. Its net loss decreased from R$169.9 million to R$114.9 million, while shareholders' equity increased from R$363.6 million to approximately R$405 million. Total liabilities nevertheless rose from approximately R$1.31 billion to R$1.36 billion, with adjusted indebtedness after specified realizable assets estimated at approximately R$1.15 billion. In Sports Value's 2025 study of Brazilian football clubs, Cruzeiro was valued at R$2.831 billion, seventh-highest in Brazil and up from R$1.472 billion in the previous edition. The same study valued the Cruzeiro brand at R$432 million, representing an increase of approximately 70% from 2024.

=== Executive management ===
Entity	Position	Name
Cruzeiro SAF	President	Pedro Lourenço
Cruzeiro SAF	Vice-president of football	Pedro Junio
Cruzeiro SAF	Administrative and financial director	Danielle Amaral
Cruzeiro SAF	Executive football director	Bruno Spindel
Cruzeiro SAF	Sporting director	Joaquim Pinto
Cruzeiro SAF	Executive football manager	Rodrigo Ramos
Cruzeiro SAF	Marketing and commercial director	Marcone Barbosa
Cruzeiro (association)	President	Lidson Potsch
Cruzeiro (association)	First vice-president	Clemenceau Chiabi
Cruzeiro (association)	Second vice-president	Waldeyr Estevão
Cruzeiro (association)	Executive director	Demetrius Granata

Complete list of Cruzeiro presidents (1921–present)
Since April 2022, the president of Cruzeiro Esporte Clube has headed the nonprofit association rather than the professional football operation, which is managed by Cruzeiro SAF.
President	Tenure	President	Tenure	President	Tenure
Aurélio Noce	1921–1922	Mario Torneli	1942	Felicio Brandi	1961–1982
Alberto Noce	1923–1924	Mário Grosso	1942–1947	Carmine Furletti	1983–1984
Américo Gasparini	1925–1926; 1928	Fernando Tamietti	1947; 1950	Benito Masci	1985–1990
Antonio Falci	1927; 1929–1930	Antônio Cunha Lobo	1947–1949	Salvador Masci	1990
Braz Pelegrino	1927–1928	Antônio Alves Simões	1949	César Masci	1991–1994
Lidio Lunardi	1931–1932	Manoel F. Campos	1950	Zezé Perrella	1995–2002
José Viana de Souza	1933	Divino Ramos	1951	Alvimar de Oliveira Costa	2003–2008
Miguel Perrela	1933–1936	José Greco	1952–1953; 1955	Zezé Perrella	2009–2011
Romeo de Paoli	1936	Wellington Armanelli	1954	Gilvan Tavares	2012–2017
Osvaldo Pinto Coelho	1936–1940	José Francisco Lemos Filho	1954	Wagner Pires de Sá	2018–2019
Ennes Cyro Poni	1941–1942	Eduardo S. Bambirra	1955–1956	José Dalai Rocha	2019–2020
João Fantoni	1942	Manoel A. de Carvalho	1957–1958	Sérgio Santos Rodrigues	2020–2023
Wilson Saliba	1942	Antonio Braz Lopes Pontes	1959–1960	Lidson Potsch	2024–present

== See also ==
- Cruzeiro Esporte Clube (women)
- Sada Cruzeiro (volleyball)
- List of Cruzeiro Esporte Clube managers
- List of Cruzeiro Esporte Clube players
