= 2002–03 Club Atlético Boca Juniors season =

Boca Juniors football season

Boca Juniors
2002-03 season
- President: Mauricio Macri
- Manager: Oscar Tabarez (until 23 December 2002); Carlos Bianchi
- Stadium: Estadio Camilo Cichero (La Bombonera)
- Apertura Tournament: 2nd
- Clausura Tournament: 2nd (in 2003 Copa Sudamericana)
- Copa Libertadores: Winners
- Copa Sudamericana: Eightfinals
- Top goalscorer: League: Apertura: Delgado (9); Clausura: Tevez (5); Schelotto (5); Bracamonte (5); All: Delgado (18)
Home colours	Away colours

The 2002–03 Club Atlético Boca Juniors season was the 73rd consecutive Primera División season played by the senior squad.

== Summary ==
During summer, several players left the club, including fan favorite midfielder Juan Roman Riquelme, who transferred out to FC Barcelona.

Macri reinforced the squad with midfielder Raul Alfredo Cascini from Toulouse FC and, on loan from FC Porto, right back defender Hugo Ibarra.

In the Apertura Tournament the team finished on 2nd spot, three points below of Champions Independiente. Meanwhile, in the inaugural season of 2002 Copa Sudamericana the squad was eliminated by Gimnasia y Esgrima de La Plata in Eightfinals stage.

Head coach Carlos Bianchi was appointed on 23 December 2002 after rumors that he accepted other positions with FC Barcelona and Mexico National Team.

For Apertura, along with Bianchi, Macri reinforced the team with a few players, including midfielders Diego Cagna from Atletico Celaya and Javier Alejandro Villarreal. The squad finished runners-up again, two points below of Champions River Plate.

The season is best remembered by the victory in 2003 Copa Libertadores. The squad reached the Finals stage and won the trophy, defeating Brazilian side Santos FC with a 5-1 global score after two matches.

== Squad ==
Note: Flags indicate national team as defined under FIFA eligibility rules; some limited exceptions apply. Players may hold more than one non-FIFA nationality.

No.	Pos.	Nation	Player
—	GK	ARG	Roberto Abbondanzieri
—	DF	ARG	Hugo Ibarra
—	DF	ARG	Nicolas Burdisso
—	DF	ARG	Rolando Schiavi
—	DF	ARG	Clemente Rodriguez
—	MF	ARG	Sebastian Battaglia
—	MF	ARG	Raul Alfredo Cascini
—	MF	ARG	Diego Crosa
—	FW	ARG	Carlos Tevez
—	FW	ARG	Guillermo Barros Schelotto
—	FW	ARG	Marcelo Delgado
—	GK	ARG	Willy Caballero
—	FW	ARG	Ezequiel González
—	DF	ARG	Matías Donnet
—	MF	ARG	Javier Alejandro Villarreal
—	DF	ARG	Raúl Estévez
—	MF	ARG	Diego Cagna
—	DF	ARG	José María Calvo
—	DF	ARG	Gustavo Pinto
—	MF	ARG	Pablo Jerez

No.	Pos.	Nation	Player
—	FW	ARG	Alfredo Moreno
—	MF	ARG	Miguel Caneo
—	MF	ARG	Franco Cangele
—	DF	ARG	Omar Sebastián Pérez
—	DF	ARG	Cesar Alberto Gonzalez
—	FW	ARG	Héctor Bracamonte
—	MF	ARG	Joel Enrique Barbosa
—	MF	ARG	Matias Silvestre
—	MF	ARG	Héctor Carballo
—	DF	ARG	Pablo Sebastian Alvarez
—	FW	ARG	Mauro Boselli
—	DF	ARG	Juan Pablo Caffa
—	MF	BRA	Gabriel Christovao
—	DF	ARG	Gustavo Eberto
—	MF	BRA	Edilio Cardoso de Oliveira
—	DF	ARG	Victor Magnano
—	DF	ARG	Victor Ormazabal
—	DF	ARG	Raul Osella
—	DF	ARG	Leonardo Veron
—	DF	ARG	Jonathan Fabbro
—	FW	ARG	Christian Giménez
—	DF	ARG	Roberto Carlos Sosa

=== Transfers ===
In
Pos.	Name	From	Type
DF	Hugo Ibarra	FC Porto	loan
MF	Raul Alfredo Cascini	Toulouse FC	
MF	Ezequiel González		
FW	Matías Donnet		
MF	Raúl Estévez		
FW	Arley Dinas		

Out
Pos.	Name	To	Type
MF	Juan Roman Riquelme	FC Barcelona	
MF	Christian Traverso		
MF	Mauricio Serna		
MF	Julio Marchant		
FW	Walter Gaitán	Tigres UANL	
DF	Jorge Daniel Martinez		
MF	Ariel Carreño		
FW	Abel Balbo		
DF	Juan Forchetti		

==== January ====
In
Pos.	Name	From	Type
MF	Javier Alejandro Villarreal		
DF	Alfredo Moreno		
DF	Diego Cagna		
MF	Pablo Jerez		
DF	Miguel Caneo		
MF	Franco Cangele		
DF	Matias Silvestre		
MF	Héctor Carballo		
DF	Pablo Sebastian Alvarez		
FW	Mauro Boselli		
DF	Juan Pablo Caffa		
DF	Gabriel Christovao		
DF	Gustavo Eberto		
DF	Edilio Cardoso de Oliveira		
DF	Victor Magnano		
DF	Victor Ormazabal		
DF	Raul Osella		
DF	Leonardo Veron		
DF	Jonathan Fabbro		

Out
Pos.	Name	To	Type
FW	Christian Giménez		
FW	Roberto Carlos Sosa		
FW	Arley Dinas		

== Competitions ==
=== Torneo Apertura ===
==== League table ====
Pos	Team	Pld	W	D	L	GF	GA	GD	Pts
1	Independiente	19	13	4	2	48	19	+29	43
2	Boca Juniors	19	12	4	3	32	15	+17	40
3	River Plate	19	11	3	5	35	23	+12	36
4	Chacarita Juniors	19	9	3	7	19	21	−2	30
5	Vélez Sársfield	19	8	4	7	23	19	+4	28

==== Position by round ====
Round	1	2	3	4	5	6	7	8	9	10	11	12	13	14	15	16	17	18	19
Ground	A	H	A	H	H	A	H	A	H	A	H	A	H	A	H	A	H	A	H
Result	D	W	W	W	D	L	W	W	L	D	W	L	W	W	W	W	W	D	W
Position	7	2	3	2	4	4	4	2	4	4	3	3	3	2	2	2	2	2	2

Source: www.afa.com.ar
A = Away; H = Home; W = Win; D = Draw; L = Loss; = Champion, 2004 Copa Libertadores

==== Matches ====
28 July 2002 1	Nueva Chicago	0-0	Boca Juniors	Liniers
				Stadium: Jose Amalfitani

4 August 2002 2	Boca Juniors	3-0	Union (SF)	La Boca
				Stadium: La Bombonera

7 August 2002 3	Banfield	0-1	Boca Juniors	Banfield
				Stadium: Florencio Sola

18 August 2002 4	Boca Juniors	3-1	Estudiantes (LP)	La Boca
				Stadium: La Bombonera

25 August 2002 5	Boca Juniors	2-2	San Lorenzo	La Boca
				Stadium: La Bombonera

1 September 2002 6	Lanus	1-0	Boca Juniors	Lanus
				Stadium: Ciudad de Lanus

8 September 2002 7	Boca Juniors	2-0	Gimnasia (LP)	La Boca
				Stadium: La Bombonera

15 September 2002 8	Olimpo (Bahia)	0-2	Boca Juniors	Bahía Blanca
				Stadium: Roberto Natalio Carminatti

22 September 2002 9	Boca Juniors	3-4	Racing	La Boca
				Stadium: La Bombonera

29 September 2002 10	Newell's Old Boys	1-1	Boca Juniors	Rosario
				Stadium: Coloso del Parque

6 October 2002 11	Boca Juniors	2-0	Velez Sarsfield	La Boca
				Stadium: La Bombonera

13 October 2002 12	Colon	1-0	Boca Juniors	Santa Fe
				Stadium: Estanislao Lopez

20 October 2002 13	Boca Juniors	2-1	Chacarita Juniors	La Boca
				Stadium: La Bombonera

27 October 2002 14	River Plate	1-2	Boca Juniors	Nuñez
				Stadium: Monumental

3 November 2002 15	Boca Juniors	3-1	Huracan	La Boca
				Stadium: La Bombonera

10 November 2002 16	Arsenal	0-1	Boca Juniors	Lanus
				Stadium: Ciudad de Lanus

17 November 2002 17	Boca Juniors	1-0	Talleres	La Boca
				Stadium: La Bombonera

24 November 2002 18	Independiente	1-1	Boca Juniors	Avellaneda
				Stadium: La Doble Visera

1 December 2002 19	Boca Juniors	3-1	Rosario Central	La Boca
				Stadium: La Bombonera

=== Torneo Clausura ===
==== League table ====
Pos	Team	Pld	W	D	L	GF	GA	GD	Pts
1	River Plate	19	13	4	2	43	18	+25	43
2	Boca Juniors	19	12	3	4	36	23	+13	39
3	Vélez Sársfield	19	12	2	5	27	12	+15	38
4	Rosario Central	19	10	7	2	40	18	+22	37
5	Olimpo	19	9	4	6	22	17	+5	31

==== Position by round ====
Round	1	2	3	4	5	6	7	8	9	10	11	12	13	14	15	16	17	18	19
Ground	H	A	H	A	A	H	A	H	A	H	A	H	A	H	A	H	A	H	A
Result	W	L	W	W	W	W	W	D	W	W	L	W	W	D	W	D	L	W	L
Position	1	8	6	3	1	1	1	1	1	1	2	1	1	2	1	2	3	2	2

Source: www.afa.com.ar
A = Away; H = Home; W = Win; D = Draw; L = Loss; = Champion, 2004 Copa Libertadores; = 2003 Copa Sudamericana

==== Matches ====
16 February 2003 1	Boca Juniors	2-0	Nueva Chicago	La Boca
				Stadium: La Bombonera

23 February 2003 2	Union (SF)	2-0	Boca Juniors	Santa Fe
				Stadium: 15 de Abril

2 March 2003 3	Boca Juniors	3-1	Banfield	La Boca
				Stadium: La Bombonera

9 March 2003 4	Estudiantes (LP)	0-2	Boca Juniors	La Plata
				Stadium: Jorge Luis Hirschi

16 March 2003 5	San Lorenzo	1-2	Boca Juniors	Bajo Flores
				Stadium: Nuevo Gasometro

23 March 2003 6	Boca Juniors	3-1	Lanus	La Boca
				Stadium: La Bombonera

30 March 2003 7	Gimnasia (LP)	0-2	Boca Juniors	La Plata
				Stadium: Juan Carmelo Zerillo

6 April 2003 8	Boca Juniors	1-1	Olimpo (Bahia)	La Boca
				Stadium: La Bombonera

13 April 2003 9	Racing	0-1	Boca Juniors	Avellaneda
				Stadium: Presidente Peron

20 April 2003 10	Boca Juniors	2-0	Newell's Old Boys	La Boca
				Stadium: La Bombonera

4 May 2003 11	Velez Sarsfield	2-0	Boca Juniors	Liniers
				Stadium: Jose Amalfitani

11 May 2003 12	Boca Juniors	2-0	Colon	La Boca
				Stadium: La Bombonera

24 May 2003 13	Chacarita Juniors	0-2	Boca Juniors	Parque Patricios
				Stadium: El Palacio

1 June 2003 14	Boca Juniors	2-2	River Plate	La Boca
				Stadium: La Bombonera

8 June 2003 15	Huracan	0-4	Boca Juniors	Parque Patricios
				Stadium: El Palacio

15 June 2003 16	Boca Juniors	2-2	Arsenal	La Boca
				Stadium: La Bombonera

22 June 2003 17	Talleres (C)	3-1	Boca Juniors	Cordoba
				Stadium: Olimpico

29 June 2003 18	Boca Juniors	3-1	Independiente	La Boca
				Stadium: La Bombonera

6 July 2003 19	Rosario Central	7-2	Boca Juniors	Rosario
				Stadium: Gigante de Arroyito

=== Copa Libertadores ===
==== Eightfinals ====
24 April 2003	Boca Juniors	0-1 (0:0)	(Brazil) Paysandu	La Boca
		Report	Iarley 67'	Stadium: Estadio La Bombonera; Referee: (Paraguay) Carlos Amarilla

15 May 2003	(Brazil) Paysandu	2-4 (0:1)	Boca Juniors	Belém
	Lecheva 52'; Burdisso 85' (own goal)	Report	Barros Schelotto 14', 67' (pen.), 70' (pen.); Delgado 57'	Stadium: Estadio Mangueirao; Referee: (Uruguay) Jorge Larrionda

==== Quarterfinals ====
21 May 2003	(Chile) Cobreloa	1-2 (1:1)	Boca Juniors	Calama
	Fuentes 10'	Report	Barros Schelotto 15', 76'	Stadium: Estadio Municipal; Referee: (Brazil) Márcio Rezende

28 May 2003	Boca Juniors	2-1 (2:1)	(Chile) Cobreloa	La Boca
	Donnet 7'; Tevez 14'	Report	Galaz 26'	Stadium: Estadio La Bombonera; Referee: (Brazil) Carlos Simon

==== Semifinals ====
11 June 2003	Boca Juniors	2-0 (1:0)	(Colombia) América de Cali	La Boca
	Schiavi 41'; Tevez 89'	Report		Stadium: Estadio La Bombonera; Referee: (Paraguay) Epifanio González

19 June 2003	(Colombia) América de Cali	0-4 (0:3)	Boca Juniors	Cali
		Report	Tevez 13' 22'; Schiavi 40' (pen.); Delgado 76' (pen.)	Stadium: Estadio Pascual Guerrero; Referee: (Chile) Carlos Chandía

==== Finals ====
25 June 2003	Boca Juniors	2–0	(Brazil) Santos	La Boca
21:40 (UTC-03:00)	Delgado 32', 83'	(Report)		Stadium: Estadio Alberto J. Armando (La Bombonera); Referee: (Colombia) Óscar Ruiz

2 July 2003	Santos (Brazil)	1–3	Boca Juniors	Morumbi
21:40 (UTC-03:00)	Alex 75'	(Report)	Tevez 21'; Delgado 84'; Schiavi 90+5'	Stadium: Estádio Cícero Pompeu de Toledo; Attendance: 73,103; Referee: (Uruguay) Jorge Larrionda

=== Copa Sudamericana ===
==== Eightfinals ====
11 September 2002,	Gimnasia y Esgrima La Plata	3:1 (1:0)	Boca Juniors	La Plata
21:10 (UTC-3)	San Esteban 37'; Enría 81' (pen.), 90'		Schiavi 49'	Stadium: Estadio Juan Carmelo Zerillo; Referee: (Argentina) Fabián Madorrán

18 September 2002	Boca Juniors	0:0	Gimnasia y Esgrima La Plata	Salta
21:10 (UTC-3)				Stadium: Estadio Padre Ernesto Martearena; Referee: (Argentina) Oscar Sequeira

== Statistics ==
=== Players statistics ===
No.	Pos	Nat	Player	Total		Apertura 2002		Sudamericana		Clausura 2003		Libertadores	
No.	Pos	Nat	Player	Apps	Goals	Apps	Goals	Apps	Goals	Apps	Goals	Apps	Goals
	GK	(Argentina) ARG	Roberto Abbondanzieri	49	0	19	0	2	0	14	0	14	0
	DF	(Argentina) ARG	Hugo Ibarra	35	4	16	3	0	0	9	1	10	0
	DF	(Argentina) ARG	Nicolas Burdisso	42	0	19	0	0	0	11	0	12	0
	DF	(Argentina) ARG	Rolando Schiavi	33	7	9	1	2	1	11	2	11	3
	DF	(Argentina) ARG	Clemente Rodriguez	44	2	19	1	1	0	11	1	13	0
	MF	(Argentina) ARG	Javier Alejandro Villarreal	22	2	0	0	0	0	11	2	11	0
	MF	(Argentina) ARG	Sebastian Battaglia	34	3	17	2	0	0	7	1	10	0
	MF	(Argentina) ARG	Raul Alfredo Cascini	38	1	19	1	0	0	8	0	11	0
	MF	(Argentina) ARG	Diego Cagna	22	0	0	0	0	0	11	0	11	0
	FW	(Argentina) ARG	Carlos Tevez	41	16	19	6	1	0	13	5	8	5
	FW	(Argentina) ARG	Marcelo Delgado	45	18	19	9	0	0	13	0	13	9
	GK	(Argentina) ARG	Willy Caballero	4	0	0	0	0	0	4	0	0	0
	FW	(Argentina) ARG	Guillermo Barros Schelotto	28	15	9	4	0	0	9	5	10	6
	FW	(Argentina) ARG	Ezequiel González	27	4	13	1	1	0	10	2	3	1
	DF	(Argentina) ARG	Matías Donnet	32	4	9	0	2	0	12	3	9	1
	MF	(Argentina) ARG	Diego Crosa	41	0	18	0	0	0	14	0	9	0
	DF	(Argentina) ARG	Raúl Estévez	26	1	6	0	2	0	15	1	3	0
	DF	(Argentina) ARG	José María Calvo	13	1	0	0	2	0	9	1	2	0
	DF	(Argentina) ARG	Gustavo Pinto	27	1	3	0	2	0	13	1	9	0
	MF	(Argentina) ARG	Pablo Jerez	13	0	0	0	0	0	8	0	5	0
	FW	(Argentina) ARG	Alfredo Moreno	11	5	0	0	0	0	5	2	6	3
	MF	(Argentina) ARG	Miguel Caneo	10	1	0	0	0	0	4	1	6	0
	MF	(Argentina) ARG	Franco Cangele	9	1	0	0	0	0	3	0	6	1
	DF	(Argentina) ARG	Omar Sebastián Pérez	5	0	1	0	2	0	2	0		
	DF	(Argentina) ARG	Cesar Alberto Gonzalez	7	0	2	0	2	0	3	0		
	FW	(Argentina) ARG	Héctor Bracamonte	21	9	14	4	2	0	5	5		
	MF	(Argentina) ARG	Joel Enrique Barbosa	3	0	0	0	0	0	3	0		
	MF	(Argentina) ARG	Matias Silvestre	5	1	0	0	0	0	5	1		
	MF	(Argentina) ARG	Héctor Carballo	2	0	0	0	0	0	2	0		
	DF	(Argentina) ARG	Pablo Sebastian Alvarez	1	0	0	0	0	0	1	0		
	FW	(Argentina) ARG	Mauro Boselli	1	0	0	0	0	0	1	0		
	DF	(Argentina) ARG	Juan Pablo Caffa	1	0	0	0	0	0	1	0		
	MF	(Brazil) BRA	Gabriel Christovao	1	0	0	0	0	0	1	0		
	DF	(Argentina) ARG	Gustavo Eberto	1	0	0	0	0	0	1	0		
	MF	(Brazil) BRA	Edilio Cardoso de Oliveira	1	0	0	0	0	0	1	0		
	DF	(Argentina) ARG	Victor Magnano	1	0	0	0	0	0	1	0		
	DF	(Argentina) ARG	Victor Ormazabal	1	0	0	0	0	0	1	0		
	DF	(Argentina) ARG	Raul Osella	1	0	0	0	0	0	1	0		
	DF	(Argentina) ARG	Leonardo Veron	1	0	0	0	0	0	1	0		
	DF	(Argentina) ARG	Jonathan Fabbro	4	1	0	0	0	0	4	1		
	FW	(Argentina) ARG	Christian Giménez	11	0	9	0	2	0				
	DF	(Argentina) ARG	Roberto Carlos Sosa	9	0	7	0	2	0				
	FW	(Colombia) COL	Arley Dinas	2	0	0	0	2	0				
