= 2003 Copa Libertadores finals =

- Event: 2003 Copa Toyota Libertadores
Boca Juniors	Santos
(Argentina)	(Brazil)
5	1
- on aggregate

First leg
Boca Juniors	Santos
2	0
- Date: 25 June 2003
- Venue: La Bombonera, Buenos Aires
- Referee: Óscar Ruiz

Second leg
Santos	Boca Juniors
1	3
- Date: 2 July 2003
- Venue: Estádio do Morumbi, São Paulo
- Referee: Jorge Larrionda
- Attendance: 73,103

The 2003 Copa Libertadores final was a two-legged football match-up to determine the 2003 Copa Libertadores champion. It was contested by Argentine club Boca Juniors and Brazilian club Santos. The first leg of the tie was played on 25 June at Boca Juniors' venue, La Bombonera, with the second leg played on 2 July at Estádio do Morumbi in São Paulo.

During the final, both sides registered all of their local players. Boca Juniors won the series 5–1 on aggregate.

== Qualified teams ==
Team	Previous finals app.
(Argentina) Boca Juniors	1963, **1977**, **1978**, 1979, **2000**, **2001**
(Brazil) Santos	**1962**, **1963**

Bold indicates winning years

== Venues ==
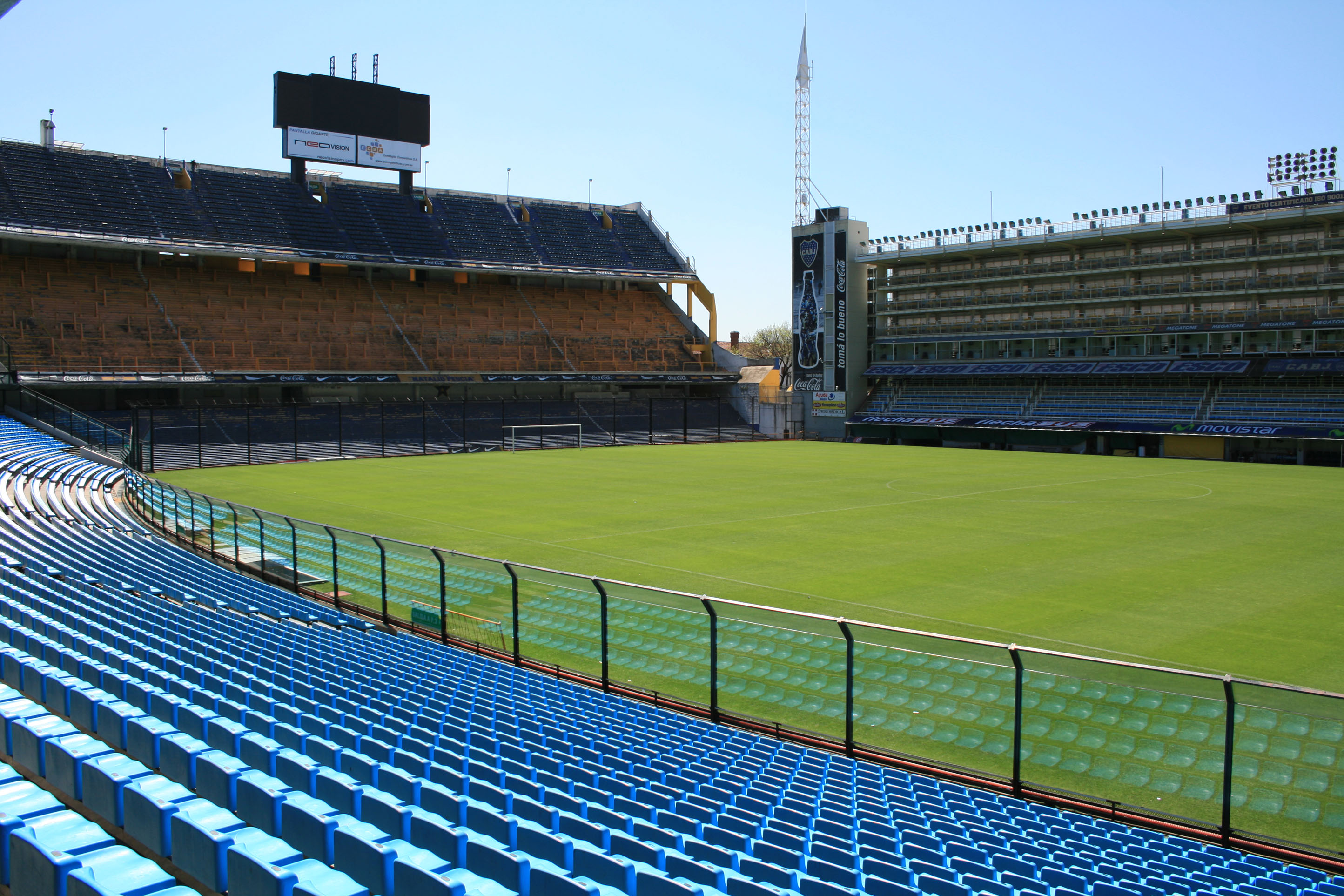
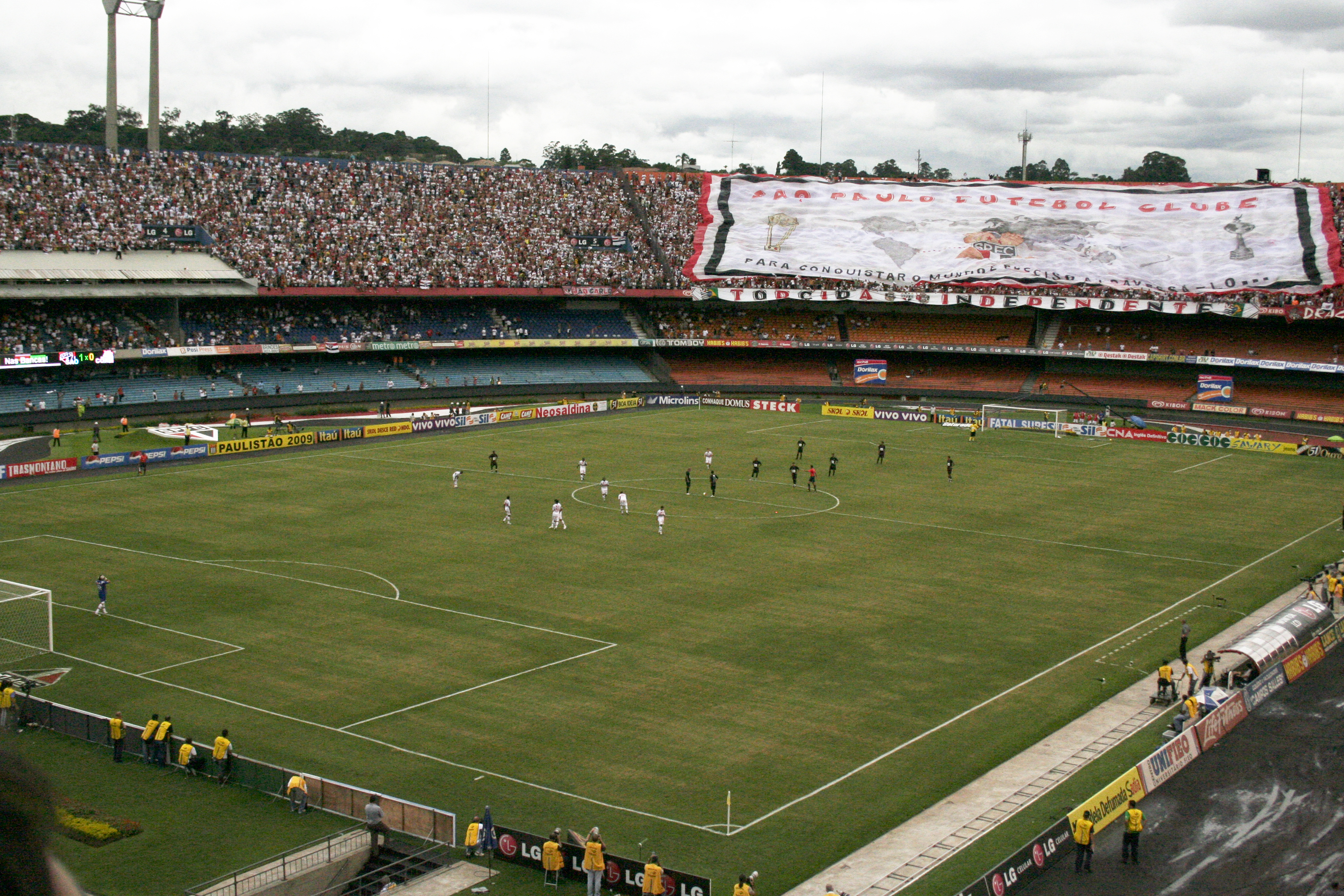
La Bombonera (left) and Estádio do Morumbi, venues for the finals

== Route to the finals ==
Santos			Boca Juniors	
(Uruguay) Nacional; A **4–4**	Alex 5'; Ricardo Oliveira 44', 84' (pen.); Robinho 64'	**Round of 16**; First leg	(Brazil) Paysandu; H **0–1**	
(Uruguay) Nacional; H **2–2** (p. 3–1)	Ricardo Oliveira 8'; Eguren 64' (o.g.)	Second leg	(Brazil) Paysandu; A **4–2**	Schelotto 14', 67' (pen.), 70' (pen.); Delgado 57'
(Mexico) Cruz Azul; A **2–2**	Renato 21'; Diego 76'	**Quarterfinals**; First leg	(Chile) Cobreloa; A **2–1**	Schelotto 15', 76'
(Mexico) Cruz Azul; H **1–0**	Robinho 13'	Second leg	(Chile) Cobreloa; H **2–1**	Donnet 7'; Tevez 14'
(Colombia) Independiente Medellín; H **1–0**	Nenê 67'	**Semifinals**; First leg	(Colombia) América de Cali; H **2–0**	Schiavi 41'; Tevez 89'
(Colombia) Independiente Medellín; A **3–2**	Alex 36'; Fabiano 61'; Léo 85'	Second leg	(Colombia) América de Cali; A **4–0**	Tevez 13', 22'; Schiavi 40' (pen.); Delgado 76' (pen.)

== Match details ==
=== First leg ===
25 June 2003
21:40 (UTC-03:00)
First leg

Boca Juniors (Argentina)	2–0	(Brazil) Santos
Delgado 32', 83'	(Report)

Estadio Alberto J. Armando (La Bombonera), Buenos Aires
Referee: Óscar Ruiz (Colombia)

**Boca Juniors**	**Santos**

GK	1	(Argentina) Roberto Abbondanzieri
RB	4	(Argentina) Hugo Ibarra	(yellow card) 16'
CB	2	(Argentina) Rolando Schiavi	(yellow card) 65'
CB	6	(Argentina) Nicolás Burdisso
LB	3	(Argentina) Clemente Rodríguez
RM	8	(Argentina) Diego Cagna	(yellow card) 71'	(substituted off) 89'
CM	5	(Argentina) Sebastián Battaglia
CM	22	(Argentina) Raúl Cascini	(yellow card) 67'
LM	7	(Argentina) G. Barros Schelotto (c)		(substituted off) 53'
CF	16	(Argentina) Marcelo Delgado
CF	11	(Argentina) Carlos Tevez
Substitutes:
GK	12	(Argentina) Willy Caballero
DF	14	(Argentina) Pablo Jerez
FW	17	(Argentina) Raúl Estévez
MF	20	(Argentina) Javier Villarreal	(yellow card) 84'	(substituted on) 53'
FW	21	(Argentina) Franco Cángele		(substituted on) 89'
MF	23	(Argentina) Gustavo Pinto
MF	24	(Argentina) Miguel Caneo
Manager:
(Argentina) Carlos Bianchi

GK	1	(Brazil) Fábio Costa
RB	22	(Brazil) Reginaldo Araújo	(red card) 82'
CB	6	(Brazil) Alex
CB	14	(Brazil) Pereira	(yellow card) 17'	(substituted off) 46'
LB	3	(Brazil) Léo
DM	5	(Brazil) Paulo Almeida (c)	(yellow card) 77'
CM	8	(Brazil) Renato
CM	21	(Brazil) Fabiano		(substituted off) 69'
RF	10	(Brazil) Diego
CF	9	(Brazil) Ricardo Oliveira
LF	7	(Brazil) Robinho
Substitutes:
GK	12	(Brazil) Júlio Sérgio
DF	2	(Brazil) André Luís	(yellow card) 80'	(substituted on) 46'
MF	15	(Brazil) Alexandre
MF	16	(Brazil) Wellington
FW	18	(Brazil) William
MF	19	(Brazil) Nenê		(substituted on) 69'
DF	23	(Brazil) Rubens Cardoso
Manager:
(Brazil) Émerson Leão

Assistant referees:
(Colombia) Jorge Luís Arango
(Colombia) Oswaldo Díaz
Fourth official:
(Colombia) Fernando Paneso

=== Second leg ===
2 July 2003
21:40 (UTC-03:00)
Second leg

Santos (Brazil)	1–3	(Argentina) Boca Juniors
Alex 75'	(Report)	Tevez 21'; Delgado 84'; Schiavi 90+5' (pen.)

Estádio do Morumbi, São Paulo
Attendance: 73,103
Referee: Jorge Larrionda (Uruguay)

**Santos**	**Boca Juniors**

GK	1	(Brazil) Fábio Costa	(yellow card) 90+3'
RB	16	(Brazil) Wellington		(substituted off) 30'
CB	6	(Brazil) Alex
CB	2	(Brazil) André Luís
LB	3	(Brazil) Léo	(yellow card) 1'
DM	5	(Brazil) Paulo Almeida (c)
CM	8	(Brazil) Renato
CM	21	(Brazil) Fabiano	(yellow card) 61'
RF	10	(Brazil) Diego
CF	9	(Brazil) Ricardo Oliveira		(substituted off) 67'
LF	7	(Brazil) Robinho
Substitutes:
GK	12	(Brazil) Júlio Sérgio
DF	14	(Brazil) Pereira
MF	15	(Brazil) Alexandre
FW	17	(Brazil) Douglas		(substituted on) 67'
FW	18	(Brazil) William
MF	19	(Brazil) Nenê		(substituted on) 30'
DF	23	(Brazil) Rubens Cardoso
Manager:
(Brazil) Émerson Leão

GK	1	(Argentina) Roberto Abbondanzieri (c)	(yellow card) 86'
RB	4	(Argentina) Hugo Ibarra
CB	2	(Argentina) Rolando Schiavi
CB	6	(Argentina) Nicolás Burdisso
LB	3	(Argentina) Clemente Rodríguez
RM	20	(Argentina) Javier Villarreal		(substituted off) 89'
CM	22	(Argentina) Raúl Cascini	(yellow card) 6'
CM	5	(Argentina) Sebastián Battaglia
LM	8	(Argentina) Diego Cagna		(substituted off) 88'
CF	16	(Argentina) Marcelo Delgado
CF	11	(Argentina) Carlos Tevez		(substituted off) 90+1'
Substitutes:
GK	12	(Argentina) Willy Caballero
DF	14	(Argentina) Pablo Jerez		(substituted on) 89'
DF	15	(Argentina) José María Calvo
FW	17	(Argentina) Raúl Estévez
FW	21	(Argentina) Franco Cángele		(substituted on) 90+1'
MF	23	(Argentina) Gustavo Pinto
MF	24	(Argentina) Miguel Caneo		(substituted on) 88'
Manager:
(Argentina) Carlos Bianchi

Assistant referees:
(Uruguay) Fernando Cresci
(Uruguay) Wálter Rial
Fourth official:
(Uruguay) Martín Vázquez
