= 2003–04 AC Milan season =

Milan
2003–04 season
- President: Silvio Berlusconi
- Manager: Carlo Ancelotti
- Stadium: San Siro
- Serie A: 1st
- Coppa Italia: Semi-finals
- Supercoppa Italiana: Runners-up
- UEFA Champions League: Quarter-finals
- UEFA Super Cup: Winners
- Intercontinental Cup: Runners-up
- Top goalscorer: League: Andriy Shevchenko (24); All: Andriy Shevchenko (29)
- Average home league attendance: 63,245
Home colours	Away colours	Third colours

In 2003–04, Associazione Calcio Milan managed to claim their first Serie A title since 1998–99. Arguably, this was the pinnacle of Carlo Ancelotti's Milan side, as the players proved they had the ability to perform effectively for the whole season.

Roma both scored more and conceded fewer goals than Milan, but the effectiveness the Milanese showed in tight matches ensured their winning margin was edged out to a stable 11 points. The title was sealed against Roma at home, with a goal by Andriy Shevchenko proving enough for a 1–0 win.

In the Champions League, Milan failed to defend their European title, as they were knocked out in the quarter-finals, losing 4–0 to Deportivo la Coruña in the second leg, after they had won 4–1 at home.

Individually, the biggest surprise was how the Brazilian trequartista Kaká seamlessly found his way into the Italian game, being a key player in Milan's success. The other two arrivals, Cafu and Giuseppe Pancaro, also integrated well with the team. Andriy Shevchenko was crowned as European Footballer of the Year on the back of his successful season. Tactically, Ancelotti used two different formations throughout the season; the 4–4–2 diamond (or 4–1–2–1–2) and the 4–3–2–1.

== Players ==
Squad at end of season

Note: Flags indicate national team as defined under FIFA eligibility rules; some limited exceptions apply. Players may hold more than one non-FIFA nationality.

No.	Pos.	Nation	Player
1	GK	ITA	Valerio Fiori
2	DF	BRA	Cafu
3	DF	ITA	Paolo Maldini
4	DF	GEO	Kakhaber Kaladze
5	MF	ARG	Fernando Redondo
7	FW	UKR	Andriy Shevchenko
8	MF	ITA	Gennaro Gattuso
9	FW	ITA	Filippo Inzaghi
10	MF	POR	Rui Costa
11	FW	BRA	Rivaldo
12	GK	BRA	Dida
13	DF	ITA	Alessandro Nesta
14	DF	CRO	Dario Simic
15	FW	DEN	Jon Dahl Tomasson

No.	Pos.	Nation	Player
18	FW	ITA	Marco Borriello
19	DF	ITA	Alessandro Costacurta
20	MF	NED	Clarence Seedorf
21	MF	ITA	Andrea Pirlo
22	MF	BRA	Kaká
23	MF	ITA	Massimo Ambrosini
24	DF	DEN	Martin Laursen
25	DF	BRA	Roque Júnior
26	DF	ITA	Giuseppe Pancaro
27	MF	BRA	Serginho
32	MF	ITA	Cristian Brocchi
45	DF	ITA	Ignazio Abate
77	GK	ITA	Christian Abbiati
86	MF	ITA	Nicola Pozzi

=== Transfers ===
In
Pos.	Name	from	Type
MF	Kaká	Sao Paulo	(€8,5 million )
DF	Cafu	Roma	free
DF	Giuseppe Pancaro	Lazio	
GK	Gabriele Aldegani	Livorno	loan ended
DF	Fabricio Coloccini	Atletico Madrid	loan ended
DF	Mohamed Sarr	Ancona	loan ended
MF	Demetrio Albertini	Atletico Madrid	loan ended
MF	Marco Donadel	Lecce	loan ended
MF	Massimo Donati	Torino	loan ended
FW	Mohammed Aliyu Datti	Siena	loan ended
FW	Marco Borriello	Empoli	loan ended
FW	Vitali Kutuzov	Sporting CP	loan ended

Out
Pos.	Name	to	Type
DF	José Chamot	Leganes	
DF	Thomas Helveg	Inter	
MF	Demetrio Albertini	Lazio	
MF	Ibrahim Ba	Bolton Wanderers	
FW	Mohammed Aliyu Datti	Standard Liege	
GK	Gabriele Aldegani	Rimini	loan
DF	Fabricio Coloccini	Villarreal	loan
DF	Roque Júnior	Leeds United	loan
DF	Mohamed Sarr	Atalanta	loan
MF	Catilina Aubameyang	Triestina	loan
MF	Samuele Dalla Bona	Bologna	loan
MF	Marco Donadel	Parma	loan
MF	Flavian André	Lyon	
FW	Vitali Kutuzov	Avellino	loan

==== Winter ====
In
Pos.	Name	from	Type

Out
Pos.	Name	to	Type
FW	Rivaldo	Cruzeiro	
DF	Roque Júnior	Siena	loan

=== Reserve squad ===
Note: Flags indicate national team as defined under FIFA eligibility rules; some limited exceptions apply. Players may hold more than one non-FIFA nationality.

No.	Pos.	Nation	Player
40	GK	ITA	Giuseppe Dei Forti
41	MF	ITA	Mattia Dal Bello
42	MF	ITA	Roberto Bortolotto
43	FW	ITA	Alessandro Matri
44	GK	ITA	Marco Taddonio
45	DF	ITA	Ignazio Abate
46	MF	ITA	Davide Canini

No.	Pos.	Nation	Player
47	DF	ITA	Elia Legati
48	MF	ITA	Patrick Kalambay
50	GK	ITA	Davide Gobbato
51	MF	BRA	Claiton
52	FW	ITA	Michele Piccolo
86	FW	ITA	Nicola Pozzi

== Competitions ==
Win Draw Loss

=== Supercoppa Italiana ===
3 August 2003	Juventus	1–1 (a.e.t.) (5–3 p)	Milan	East Rutherford, New Jersey, United States
22:00 CEST (UTC+02:00)	Trezeguet 105+3'		Pirlo 105+2' (pen.)	Stadium: Giants Stadium; Attendance: 54,128; Referee: Pierluigi Collina
	Penalties
	Di Vaio (penalty scored); Trezeguet (penalty scored); Birindelli (penalty scored); Camoranesi (penalty scored); Ferrara (penalty scored)		(penalty scored) Pirlo; (penalty missed) Serginho; (penalty scored) Brocchi; (penalty scored) Nesta

=== UEFA Super Cup ===
29 August 2003	Milan (Italy)	1–0	(Portugal) Porto	Monaco
20:45 CEST	Shevchenko 10'	Report		Stadium: Stade Louis II; Attendance: 16,885; Referee: Graham Barber (England)

=== Serie A ===
==== League table ====
Pos	Team	Pld	W	D	L	GF	GA	GD	Pts	Qualification or relegation
1	Milan (C)	34	25	7	2	65	24	+41	82	Qualification to Champions League group stage
2	Roma	34	21	8	5	68	19	+49	71	Qualification to Champions League group stage
3	Juventus	34	21	6	7	67	42	+25	69	Qualification to Champions League third qualifying round
4	Internazionale	34	17	8	9	59	37	+22	59	Qualification to Champions League third qualifying round
5	Parma	34	16	10	8	57	46	+11	58	Qualification to UEFA Cup first round

Source: Almanacco Illustrato del Calcio – La Storia 1898-2004, Panini Edizioni, Modena, September 2005
Rules for classification: 1) points; 2) tiebreaker for relevant positions 3) head-to-head points and goal difference; 4) head-to-head goals scored; 5) goal difference; 6) number of goals scored.
(C) Champions

==== Results summary ====
Overall								Home						Away					
Pld	W	D	L	GF	GA	GD	Pts	W	D	L	GF	GA	GD	W	D	L	GF	GA	GD
34	25	7	2	65	24	+41	82	14	2	1	39	15	+24	11	5	1	26	9	+17

Source: Competitive matches

==== Results by round ====
Round	1	2	3	4	5	6	7	8	9	10	11	12	13	14	15	16	17	18	19	20	21	22	23	24	25	26	27	28	29	30	31	32	33	34	35
Ground	A	H	A	H	A	H	A	H	A	A	H	A	H	H	A	H	A	H	H	A	H	A	H	A	H	A	H	H	A	H	A	A	H	A	H
Result	W	W	D	W	W	W	W	D	D	W	W	W	-	L	W	W	W	W	W	W	W	D	W	W	W	W	W	D	D	W	W	D	W	L	W
Position	1	1	1	1	1	1	1	1	2	2	1	1	2	2	2	2	2	2	1	1	1	1	1	1	1	1	1	1	1	1	1	1	1	1	1

Source: Competitive matches
A = Away; H = Home; W = Win; D = Draw; L = Loss; = Leader, UEFA Champions League Groups stage; = UEFA Champions League Groups stage; = UEFA Champions League Qualifying round; = 2004–05 UEFA Cup; = 2004–05 Serie B

==== Matches ====
1 September 2003 1	Ancona	0–2	Milan	Ancona
20:30 CEST (UTC+02:00)		Report	Shevchenko 30', 75'	Stadium: Stadio del Conero; Attendance: 22,746; Referee: Pierluigi Collina

13 September 2003 2	Milan	2–1	Bologna	Milan
20:30 CEST (UTC+02:00)	Shevchenko 9'; Inzaghi 85'	Report	Nervo 32'	Stadium: San Siro; Attendance: 57,835; Referee: Roberto Rosetti

21 September 2003 3	Perugia	1–1	Milan	Perugia
15:00 CEST (UTC+02:00)	Vryzas 30'	Report	Gattuso 19'	Stadium: Stadio Renato Curi; Attendance: 17,551; Referee: Gianluca Paparesta

28 September 2003 4	Milan	3–0	Lecce	Milan
15:00 CEST (UTC+02:00)	Shevchenko 21', 69'; Tomasson 90'	Report		Stadium: San Siro; Attendance: 57,710; Referee: Roberto Rosetti

5 October 2003 5	Internazionale	1–3	Milan	Milan
20:30 CEST (UTC+02:00)	Martins 78'	Report	Inzaghi 39'; Kaká 46'; Shevchenko 77'	Stadium: San Siro; Attendance: 75,831; Referee: Massimo De Santis

19 October 2003 6	Milan	1–0	Lazio	Milan
20:30 CEST (UTC+02:00)	Pirlo 37'	Report		Stadium: San Siro; Attendance: 62,122; Referee: Salvatore Racalbuto

26 October 2003 7	Sampdoria	0–3	Milan	Genoa
15:00 CET (UTC+01:00)		Report	Tomasson 38'; Shevchenko 59', 90+2'	Stadium: Stadio Luigi Ferraris; Attendance: 34,424; Referee: Roberto Rosetti

1 November 2003 8	Milan	1–1	Juventus	Milan
20:30 CET (UTC+01:00)	Tomasson 65'	Report	Di Vaio 84'	Stadium: San Siro; Attendance: 77,921; Referee: Salvatore Racalbuto

9 November 2003 9	Parma	0–0	Milan	Parma
15:00 CET (UTC+01:00)		Report		Stadium: Stadio Ennio Tardini; Attendance: 23,663; Referee: Pierluigi Collina

23 November 2003 10	Chievo	0–2	Milan	Verona
20:30 CET (UTC+01:00)		Report	Shevchenko 45+1', 50'	Stadium: Stadio Marc'Antonio Bentegodi; Attendance: 30,186; Referee: Stefano Farina

30 November 2003 11	Milan	2–0	Modena	Milan
15:00 CET (UTC+01:00)	Shevchenko 24', 67'	Report		Stadium: San Siro; Attendance: 59,577; Referee: Domenico Messina

6 December 2003 12	Empoli	0–1	Milan	Empoli
18:00 CET (UTC+01:00)		Report	Kaká 81'	Stadium: Stadio Carlo Castellani; Attendance: 12,791; Referee: Salvatore Racalbuto

21 December 2003 14	Milan	1–2	Udinese	Milan
15:00 CET (UTC+01:00)	Cafu 70'	Report	Fava 2'; Sensini 51'	Stadium: San Siro; Attendance: 53,381; Referee: Paolo Bertini

6 January 2004 15	Roma	1–2	Milan	Rome
20:30 CET (UTC+01:00)	Cassano 45+3'	Report	Shevchenko 24', 63'	Stadium: Stadio Olimpico; Attendance: 73,383; Referee: Gianluca Paparesta

11 January 2004 16	Milan	3–1	Reggina	Milan
15:00 CET (UTC+01:00)	Kaká 8', 55'; Pirlo 71' (pen.)	Report	Torrisi 2'	Stadium: San Siro; Attendance: 55,604; Referee: Roberto Rosetti

18 January 2004 17	Brescia	0–1	Milan	Brescia
20:30 CET (UTC+01:00)		Report	Pancaro 81'	Stadium: Stadio Mario Rigamonti; Attendance: 19,972; Referee: Paolo Bertini

25 January 2004 18	Milan	5–0	Ancona	Milan
15:00 CET (UTC+01:00)	Shevchenko 64' (pen.); Rui Costa 71'; Tomasson 78' (pen.); Kaká 84', 90'	Report		Stadium: San Siro; Attendance: 53,266; Referee: Luca Palanca

28 January 2004 13	Milan	2–1	Siena	Milan
20:30 CET (UTC+01:00)	Kaká 38'; Tomasson 54'	Report	Flo 87'	Stadium: San Siro; Attendance: 54,428; Referee: Daniele Tombolini
Note: Rescheduled because of Milan's participation in the 2003 Intercontinental Cup.

1 February 2004 19	Bologna	0–2	Milan	Bologna
15:00 CET (UTC+01:00)		Report	Shevchenko 19'; Tomasson 89'	Stadium: Stadio Renato Dall'Ara; Attendance: 30,149; Referee: Emilio Pellegrino

8 February 2004 20	Milan	2–1	Perugia	Milan
15:00 CET (UTC+01:00)	Rui Costa 74'; Pirlo 78' (pen.)	Report	Fresi 84' (pen.)	Stadium: San Siro; Attendance: 55,229; Referee: Matteo Trefoloni

15 February 2004 21	Lecce	1–1	Milan	Lecce
15:00 CET (UTC+01:00)	Chevantón 19'	Report	Shevchenko 53'	Stadium: Stadio Via del Mare; Attendance: 31,967; Referee: Tiziano Pieri

21 February 2004 22	Milan	3–2	Internazionale	Milan
20:30 CET (UTC+01:00)	Tomasson 56'; Kaká 57'; Seedorf 85'	Report	Stanković 15'; C. Zanetti 40'	Stadium: San Siro; Attendance: 78,334; Referee: Roberto Rosetti

29 February 2004 23	Lazio	0–1	Milan	Rome
20:30 CET (UTC+01:00)		Report	Ambrosini 75'	Stadium: Stadio Olimpico; Attendance: 54,632; Referee: Gianluca Paparesta

7 March 2004 24	Milan	3–1	Sampdoria	Milan
15:00 CET (UTC+01:00)	Pirlo 17'; Inzaghi 35'; Kaká 49'	Report	Doni 27'	Stadium: San Siro; Attendance: 64,967; Referee: Matteo Trefoloni

14 March 2004 25	Juventus	1–3	Milan	Turin
20:30 CET (UTC+01:00)	Ferrara 81'	Report	Shevchenko 25'; Seedorf 63', 75'	Stadium: Stadio delle Alpi; Attendance: 52,300; Referee: Pierluigi Collina

20 March 2004 26	Milan	3–1	Parma	Milan
20:30 CET (UTC+01:00)	Tomasson 33', 52'; Shevchenko 65'	Report	Gilardino 82'	Stadium: San Siro; Attendance: 63,433; Referee: Stefano Farina

28 March 2004 27	Milan	2–2	Chievo	Milan
15:00 CEST (UTC+02:00)	Pirlo 80'; Shevchenko 90+7'	Report	Sculli 22'; Perrotta 39'	Stadium: San Siro; Attendance: 64,862; Referee: Gianluca Paparesta

4 April 2004 28	Modena	1–1	Milan	Modena
15:00 CEST (UTC+02:00)	Amoruso 52'	Report	Tomasson 42'	Stadium: Stadio Alberto Braglia; Attendance: 18,575; Referee: Massimo De Santis

10 April 2004 29	Milan	1–0	Empoli	Milan
15:00 CEST (UTC+02:00)	Pirlo 86' (pen.)	Report		Stadium: San Siro; Attendance: 61,964; Referee: Gianluca Paparesta

17 April 2004 30	Siena	1–2	Milan	Siena
18:00 CEST (UTC+02:00)	Chiesa 38' (pen.)	Report	Shevchenko 26'; Kaká 80'	Stadium: Stadio Artemio Franchi – Montepaschi Arena; Attendance: 13,090; Referee: Pierluigi Collina

25 April 2004 31	Udinese	0–0	Milan	Udine
15:00 CEST (UTC+02:00)		Report		Stadium: Stadio Friuli; Attendance: 29,819; Referee: Massimo De Santis

2 May 2004 32	Milan	1–0	Roma	Milan
15:00 CEST (UTC+02:00)	Shevchenko 2'	Report		Stadium: San Siro; Attendance: 76,911; Referee: Domenico Messina

9 May 2004 33	Reggina	2–1	Milan	Reggio Calabria
15:00 CEST (UTC+02:00)	Di Michele 7'; Cozza 30' (pen.)	Report	Shevchenko 51'	Stadium: Stadio Oreste Granillo; Attendance: 23,513; Referee: Nicola Ayroldi

16 May 2004 34	Milan	4–2	Brescia	Milan
15:00 CEST (UTC+02:00)	Tomasson 36', 59'; Shevchenko 37'; Rui Costa 66'	Report	Matuzalém 53', 69'	Stadium: San Siro; Attendance: 77,618; Referee: Antonio Danilo Giannoccaro

=== Coppa Italia ===
==== Round of 16 ====
3 December 2003 First leg	Sampdoria	0–1	Milan	Genoa
21:10 CET (UTC+01:00)		Report	Conte 79' (o.g.)	Stadium: Stadio Luigi Ferraris; Attendance: 10,000; Referee: Paolo Dondarini

18 December 2003 Second leg	Milan	1–0 (2–0 agg.)	Sampdoria	Milan
20:45 CET (UTC+01:00)	Inzaghi 13'	Report		Stadium: San Siro; Attendance: 2,742; Referee: Antonio Dattilo

==== Quarter-finals ====
14 January 2004 First leg	Milan	2–1	Roma	Milan
20:45 CET (UTC+01:00)	Tomasson 40'; Ambrosini 90+1'	Report	Carew 78'	Stadium: San Siro; Attendance: 9,325; Referee: Domenico Messina

22 January 2004 Second leg	Roma	1–2 (2–4 agg.)	Milan	Rome
21:00 CET (UTC+01:00)	Mancini 81'	Report	Nesta 49'; Tomasson 57'	Stadium: Stadio Olimpico; Attendance: 49,136; Referee: Emilio Pellegrino

==== Semi-finals ====
5 February 2004 First leg	Milan	1–2	Lazio	Milan
21:00 CET (UTC+01:00)	Inzaghi 45+2'	Report	Fiore 1'; Couto 36'	Stadium: San Siro; Attendance: 10,907; Referee: Roberto Rosetti

11 February 2004 Second leg	Lazio	4–0 (6–1 agg.)	Milan	Rome
21:00 CET (UTC+01:00)	César 11'; Liverani 15'; Fiore 35', 41'	Report		Stadium: Stadio Olimpico; Attendance: 60,000; Referee: Pierluigi Collina

=== UEFA Champions League ===
==== Group stage ====
Pos	Team	Pld	W	D	L	GF	GA	GD	Pts	Qualification
1	(Italy) Milan	6	3	1	2	4	3	+1	10	Advance to knockout stage
2	(Spain) Celta Vigo	6	2	3	1	7	6	+1	9	Advance to knockout stage
3	(Belgium) Club Brugge	6	2	2	2	5	6	−1	8	Transfer to UEFA Cup
4	(Netherlands) Ajax	6	2	0	4	6	7	−1	6	

Source: RSSSF

16 September 2003 1	Milan (Italy)	1–0	(Netherlands) Ajax	Milan, Italy
20:45 CEST (UTC+02:00)	Inzaghi 67'; Gattuso (red card) 90+1'	Report	Van der Vaart (yellow card) 39'; Escudé (yellow card) 45'; Ibrahimović (yellow card) 90+1'	Stadium: San Siro; Referee: Ľuboš Micheľ (Slovakia)

1 October 2003 2	Celta Vigo (Spain)	0–0	(Italy) Milan	Vigo, Spain
20:45 CEST (UTC+02:00)	Vágner (yellow card) 66'	Report	Cafu (yellow card) 28'; Ambrosini (yellow card) 47'; Maldini (yellow card) 63'; Pirlo (yellow card) 79'	Stadium: Balaídos; Referee: Mike Riley (England)

22 October 2003 3	Milan (Italy)	0–1	(Belgium) Club Brugge	Milan, Italy
20:45 CEST (UTC+02:00)		Report	Mendoza 33'; De Cock (yellow card) 47'	Stadium: San Siro; Referee: Tom Henning Øvrebø (Norway)

4 November 2003 4	Club Brugge (Belgium)	0–1	(Italy) Milan	Bruges, Belgium
20:45 CET (UTC+01:00)	Rozehnal (yellow card) 31'	Report	Nesta (yellow card) 29' (yellow-red card) 37'; Pancaro (yellow card) 42'; Kaká 86'	Stadium: Jan Breydel Stadium; Referee: Herbert Fandel (Germany)

26 November 2003 5	Ajax (Netherlands)	0–1	(Italy) Milan	Amsterdam, Netherlands
20:45 CET (UTC+01:00)	Yakubu (yellow card) 36'; Galásek (yellow card) 43'	Report	Inzaghi (yellow card) 34'; Shevchenko 52'	Stadium: Amsterdam Arena; Referee: Urs Meier (Switzerland)

9 December 2003 6	Milan (Italy)	1–2	(Spain) Celta Vigo	Milan, Italy
20:45 CET (UTC+01:00)	Kaká 40'; Brocchi (yellow card) 86'		José Ignacio (yellow card) 35', (goal) 71'; Jesuli 42'; Juanfran (yellow card) 45+1'; Berizzo (yellow card) 81'; Giovanella (yellow card) 90+1'	Stadium: San Siro; Referee: Kyros Vassaras (Greece)

==== Knockout phase ====
===== Round of 16 =====
24 February 2004 First leg	Sparta Prague (Czech Republic)	0–0	(Italy) Milan	Prague, Czech Republic
20:45 CET (UTC+01:00)		Report	Gattuso (yellow card) 78'; Cafu (yellow card) 83'	Stadium: Stadion Letná; Attendance: 20,640; Referee: Graham Poll (England)

10 March 2004 Second leg	Milan (Italy)	4–1 (4–1 agg.)	(Czech Republic) Sparta Prague	Milan, Italy
20:45 CET (UTC+01:00)	Inzaghi 45+2'; Shevchenko 66', 79'; Gattuso 85', (yellow card) 86'	Report	Sivok (yellow card) 7'; Pergl (yellow card) 25'; Jun 59'	Stadium: San Siro; Attendance: 50,000; Referee: Markus Merk (Germany)

===== Quarter-finals =====
23 March 2004 First leg	Milan (Italy)	4–1	(Spain) Deportivo La Coruña	Milan, Italy
20:45 CET (UTC+01:00)	Kaká 45'; Kaká 49'; Shevchenko 46'; Pirlo 53'; Costacurta (yellow card) 59'	Report	Pandiani 11'; Scaloni (yellow card) 48'	Stadium: San Siro; Attendance: 60,335; Referee: Valentin Ivanov (Russia)

7 April 2004 Second leg	Deportivo La Coruña (Spain)	4–0 (5–4 agg.)	(Italy) Milan	A Coruña, Spain
20:45 CEST (UTC+02:00)	Pandiani 5', (yellow card) 83'; Valerón 35'; Luque 44'; Víctor (yellow card) 67'; Fran 76'	Report	Pirlo (yellow card) 55'	Stadium: Estadio Riazor; Attendance: 29,000; Referee: Urs Meier (Switzerland)

=== Intercontinental Cup ===
14 December 2003	Milan (Italy)	1–1 (a.e.t.) (1–3 p)	(Argentina) Boca Juniors	International Stadium Yokohama, Yokohama
19:15 JST	Tomasson 23'	Report	Donnet 28'	Attendance: 70,000; Referee: Valentin Ivanov (Russia)
	Penalties
	Pirlo (penalty missed); Rui Costa (penalty scored); Seedorf (penalty missed); Costacurta (penalty missed)		(penalty scored) Schiavi; (penalty missed) Battaglia; (penalty scored) Donnet; (penalty scored) Cascini

== Statistics ==
=== Players statistics ===
No.	Pos	Nat	Player	Total		Serie A		Coppa Italia		Champions League	
No.	Pos	Nat	Player	Apps	Goals	Apps	Goals	Apps	Goals	Apps	Goals
12	GK	(Brazil) BRA	Dida	43	-29	32	-20	2	-2	9	-7
2	DF	(Brazil) BRA	Cafu	38	1	26+2	1	1	0	9	0
13	DF	(Italy) ITA	Nesta	36	1	26	0	4	1	6	0
3	DF	(Italy) ITA	Maldini	39	0	30	0	0	0	9	0
26	DF	(Italy) ITA	Pancaro	31	1	17+4	1	3	0	6+1	0
8	MF	(Italy) ITA	Gattuso	42	2	29+4	1	2	0	7	1
21	MF	(Italy) ITA	Pirlo	41	7	31+1	6	0	0	9	1
20	MF	(Netherlands) NED	Seedorf	42	3	26+3	3	5	0	8	0
10	MF	(Portugal) POR	Rui Costa	38	3	19+9	3	4	0	1+5	0
22	MF	(Brazil) BRA	Kaká	44	14	25+5	10	4	0	10	4
7	FW	(Ukraine) UKR	Shevchenko	42	28	30+2	24	1	0	9	4
77	GK	(Italy) ITA	Abbiati	7	-12	2	-4	4	-6	1	-2
19	DF	(Italy) ITA	Costacurta	35	0	18+4	0	5	0	6+2	0
15	FW	(Denmark) DEN	Tomasson	36	14	17+9	12	4	2	2+4	0
23	MF	(Italy) ITA	Ambrosini	29	2	9+11	1	3	1	2+4	0
27	MF	(Brazil) BRA	Serginho	32	0	7+13	0	5	0	2+5	0
9	FW	(Italy) ITA	Inzaghi	25	7	11+3	3	3	2	6+2	2
14	DF	(Croatia) CRO	Simic	18	0	6+4	0	6	0	1+1	0
24	DF	(Denmark) DEN	Laursen	19	0	4+6	0	6	0	2+1	0
32	MF	(Italy) ITA	Brocchi	20	0	2+9	0	6	0	2+1	0
5	MF	(Argentina) ARG	Redondo	14	0	2+6	0	5	0	1	0
4	DF	(Georgia (country)) GEO	Kaladze	10	0	5+1	0	3	0	1	0
1	GK	(Italy) ITA	Fiori	1	0	0	-0	1	-0	0	-0
18	FW	(Italy) ITA	Borriello	11	0	0+4	0	6	0	1	0
11	FW	(Brazil) BRA	Rivaldo	1	0	0	0	0	0	0+1	0
45	DF	(Italy) ITA	Abate	2	0	0	0	1	0	0+1	0
86	MF	(Italy) ITA	Pozzi	0	0	0	0	0	0	0	0
25	DF	(Brazil) BRA	Roque Júnior	0	0	0	0	0	0	0	0

- Source: https://www.bdfutbol.com/en/t/t2003-043015.html

=== Goalscorers ===
- (Ukraine) Andriy Shevchenko 24 (1 pen.)
- (Denmark) Jon Dahl Tomasson 12 (1 pen.)
- (Brazil) Kaká 10
- (Italy) Andrea Pirlo 6 (3 pen.)
