= 2003 Intercontinental Cup =

- Match programme cover
Milan	Boca Juniors
(Italy)	(Argentina)
1	1
- After extra time Boca Juniors won 3–1 on penalties
- Date: 14 December 2003
- Venue: International Stadium Yokohama, Yokohama
- Man of the Match: Matías Donnet (Boca Juniors)
- Referee: Valentin Ivanov (Russia)
- Attendance: 66,757

The 2003 Intercontinental Cup was the 42nd Intercontinental Cup, an annual association football match contested by the winners of the previous season's UEFA Champions League and Copa Libertadores competitions. The match was played on 14 December 2003 between Boca Juniors of Argentina, winners of the 2003 Copa Libertadores and AC Milan of Italy, winners of the 2002–03 UEFA Champions League. The match was played at the neutral venue of the International Stadium Yokohama in Yokohama, in front of 70,000 fans. Matías Donnet was named as man of the match.

Since the 2004 final (a year later) was goalless after the extra 30 minutes and the game was settled by a penalty shoot-out, Matías Donnet scored the last goal of the Intercontinental Cup before being abolished to the FIFA Club World Cup.

== Venue ==
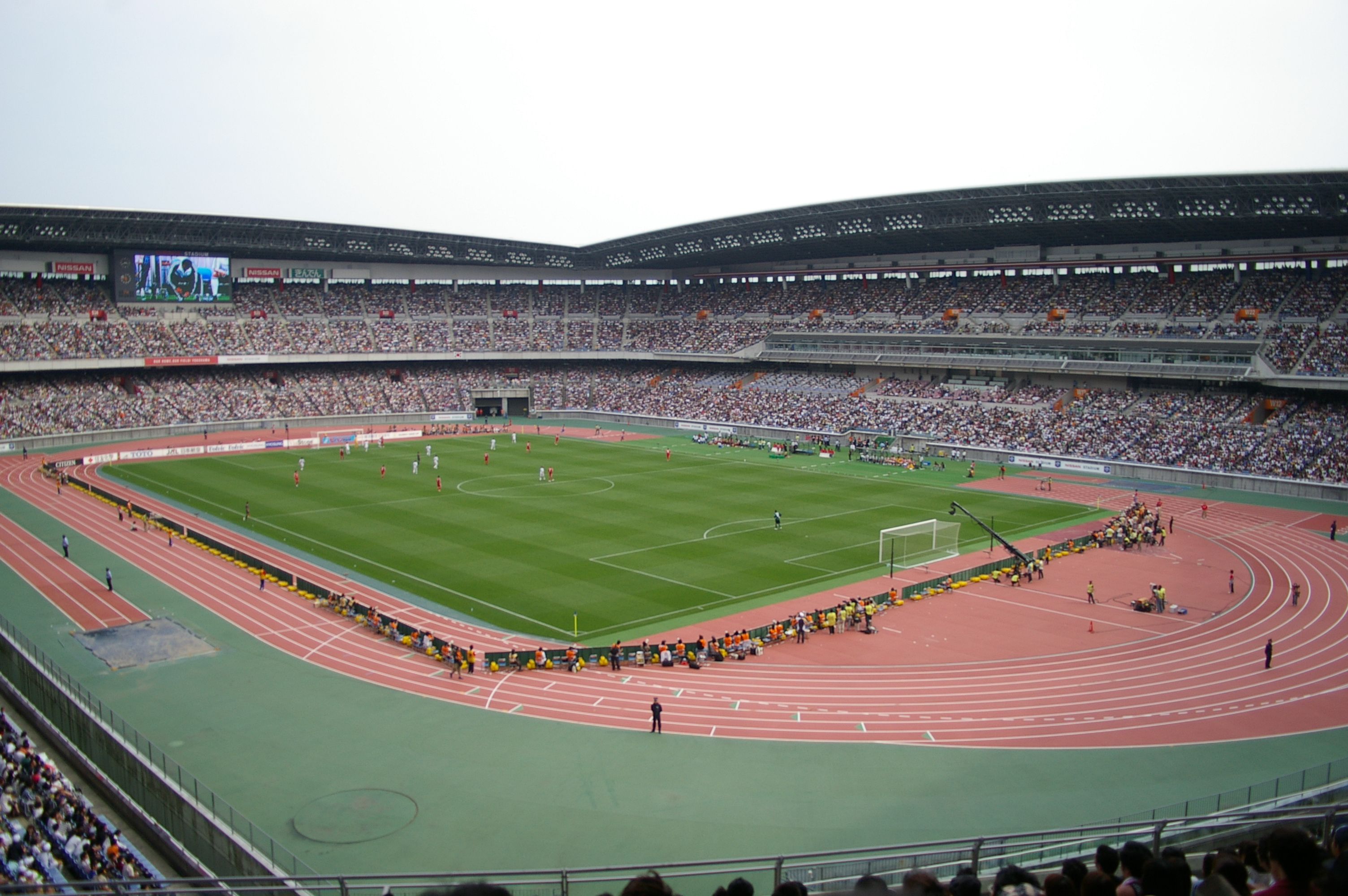
International Stadium, Yokohama, hosted the final

== Match details ==
14 December 2003
19:15 JST

Milan (Italy)	1–1 (a.e.t.)	(Argentina) Boca Juniors
Tomasson 23'	Report	Donnet 28'
Penalties
Pirlo (penalty missed); Rui Costa (penalty scored); Seedorf (penalty missed); Costacurta (penalty missed)	1–3	(penalty scored) Schiavi; (penalty missed) Battaglia; (penalty scored) Donnet; (penalty scored) Cascini

International Stadium Yokohama, Yokohama
Attendance: 66,757
Referee: Valentin Ivanov (Russia)

Milan	Boca Juniors

GK	12	(Brazil) Dida
RB	2	(Brazil) Cafu	(yellow card) 61'
CB	19	(Italy) Alessandro Costacurta
CB	3	(Italy) Paolo Maldini (c)
LB	26	(Italy) Giuseppe Pancaro
DM	21	(Italy) Andrea Pirlo
CM	8	(Italy) Gennaro Gattuso		(substituted off) 102'
CM	20	(Netherlands) Clarence Seedorf
AM	22	(Brazil) Kaká	(yellow card) 19'	(substituted off) 77'
CF	7	(Ukraine) Andriy Shevchenko
CF	15	(Denmark) Jon Dahl Tomasson		(substituted off) 69'
Substitutes:
GK	77	(Italy) Christian Abbiati
DF	4	(Georgia (country)) Kakha Kaladze
DF	24	(Denmark) Martin Laursen
MF	10	(Portugal) Rui Costa		(substituted on) 77'
MF	23	(Italy) Massimo Ambrosini		(substituted on) 102'
MF	27	(Brazil) Serginho
FW	9	(Italy) Filippo Inzaghi		(substituted on) 69'
Manager:
(Italy) Carlo Ancelotti

GK	1	(Argentina) Roberto Abbondanzieri
CB	14	(Colombia) Luis Perea	(yellow card) 6'
CB	2	(Argentina) Rolando Schiavi
CB	6	(Argentina) Nicolás Burdisso
RM	8	(Argentina) Diego Cagna (c)
CM	5	(Argentina) Sebastián Battaglia
CM	22	(Argentina) Raúl Cascini
LM	3	(Argentina) Clemente Rodríguez
AM	18	(Argentina) Matías Donnet
CF	10	(Brazil) Iarley
CF	7	(Argentina) Guillermo Barros Schelotto		(substituted off) 73'
Substitutes:
GK	12	(Argentina) Willy Caballero
DF	4	(Argentina) Pablo Jerez
DF	13	(Argentina) Diego Crosa
MF	16	(Colombia) Fabián Vargas
MF	20	(Argentina) Javier Villarreal
FW	9	(Argentina) Carlos Tevez		(substituted on) 73'
FW	11	(Argentina) Roberto Colautti
Manager:
(Argentina) Carlos Bianchi

Man of the Match:
(Argentina) Matías Donnet (Boca Juniors)

Assistant referees:
Gennady Krasyuk (Russia)
Yuri Dupanov (Belarus)
Fourth official:
Masayoshi Okada (Japan)

== See also ==
- Intercontinental Cup
- 2002–03 UEFA Champions League
- 2003 Copa Libertadores
- FIFA Club World Cup
- 2007 FIFA Club World Cup Final – contested between same teams
- A.C. Milan in European football
