= Hugo Ibarra =

Argentine footballer

Personal information
- Full name: Hugo Benjamín Ibarra
- Date of birth: 1 April 1974 (age 52)
- Place of birth: El Colorado, Formosa, Argentina
- Height: 1.71 m (5 ft 7 in)
- Position: Right back

Youth career
- Colón

Senior career*
Years	Team	Apps	(Gls)
1995–1998	Colón	140	(8)
1998–2001	Boca Juniors	85	(2)
2001–2005	FC Porto	20	(0)
2002–2003	→ Boca Juniors (loan)	25	(4)
2003–2004	→ Monaco (loan)	25	(0)
2004–2005	→ Espanyol (loan)	31	(1)
2005–2010	Boca Juniors	124	(3)
Total		450	(18)

International career
1998–2007	Argentina	11	(0)

Managerial career
- 2011–2014: Boca Juniors (youth)
- 2015–2021: Boca Juniors II (assistant)
- 2021–2022: Boca Juniors II
- 2022–2023: Boca Juniors
- * Club domestic league appearances and goals

Hugo Benjamín Ibarra (born 1 April 1974) nicknamed "Negro," is an Argentine football manager and former player who played as a right back. He last managed Boca Juniors.

With 324 matches played, 10 goals scored and 15 titles won with Boca Juniors, Ibarra is considered the best right back in the history of the club.

== Playing career ==
Born in Pirané Department, northern province of Formosa, Ibarra went to Santa Fe Province to start playing in Colón. It was a second division team when he started playing professionally in 1993, but two years later the team got promoted to first division. His performance called Boca Juniors' attention, and he was transferred to the club he would late refer to as "my home".

After three successful seasons in Boca, Ibarra moved to Europe. Because he did not have a European passport, Ibarra was loaned back to Boca Juniors after playing his first season in Portuguese FC Porto. Porto loaned him to French Monaco FC a year later, and then to Spanish RCD Espanyol.

Ibarra played six matches for Argentina national football team, including Copa América 1999. While at Monaco, the team reached UEFA Champions League finals, beating teams such as Real Madrid and Chelsea on the way. They lost the final 3–0 to his parent club Porto who owned him.

In July 2005, after some difficult negotiations due to the economic crisis in Argentina, Hugo Ibarra went back to Boca Juniors, his last team. On 18 April 2007, he got back to Argentina national football team, as Argentina's captain, to play a friendly match against Chile.

In September 2010, he announced his retirement from professional football.

== Coaching career ==
At the end of 2011, Ibarra was hired in a youth coordinator role at Boca Juniors' youth academy. From the 2015 season, Ibarra became assistant coach of Boca's reserve team under manager Rolando Schiavi.

In 2021, he began in a new role where he would be the nexus between amateur football and the Football Council in Boca Juniors. On 17 August 2021, Boca's reserve team manager, Sebastián Battaglia, was appointed first-team manager on an interim basis, while Ibarra and Mauricio Serna took charge of the reserve team, also on an interim basis.

Ibarra was named interim manager of Boca in July 2022, after Battaglia was sacked. On 29 November, he was confirmed as manager for the upcoming season. On 28 March 2023, he was sacked by the club.

== Managerial statistics ==
As of match played 25 March 2023

Managerial record by team and tenure
Team	Nat	From	To	Record							
Team	Nat	From	To	G	W	D	L	GF	GA	GD	Win %
Boca Juniors II	(Argentina)	17 August 2021	7 July 2022	40	21	12	7	84	46	+38	52.50
Boca Juniors	(Argentina)	8 July 2022	28 March 2023	36	20	7	9	44	33	+11	55.56
Total				76	41	19	16	128	79	+49	53.95

== Honours ==
=== Player ===
Boca Juniors

- Primera División (5): 1998 Apertura, 1999 Clausura, 2005 Apertura, 2006 Clausura, 2008 Apertura
- Copa Libertadores (4): 2000, 2001, 2003, 2007
- Copa Intercontinental: 2000
- Copa Sudamericana (1): 2005
- Recopa Sudamericana (1): 2008

Monaco

- UEFA Champions League runner-up: 2003–04

Porto

- Portuguese Supercup (1): 2001

Argentina

- Copa America runner-up: 2007

=== Manager ===
Boca Juniors

- Primera División (1): 2022
- Supercopa Argentina (1): 2022
