= Roberto Abbondanzieri =

Argentine footballer (born 1972)

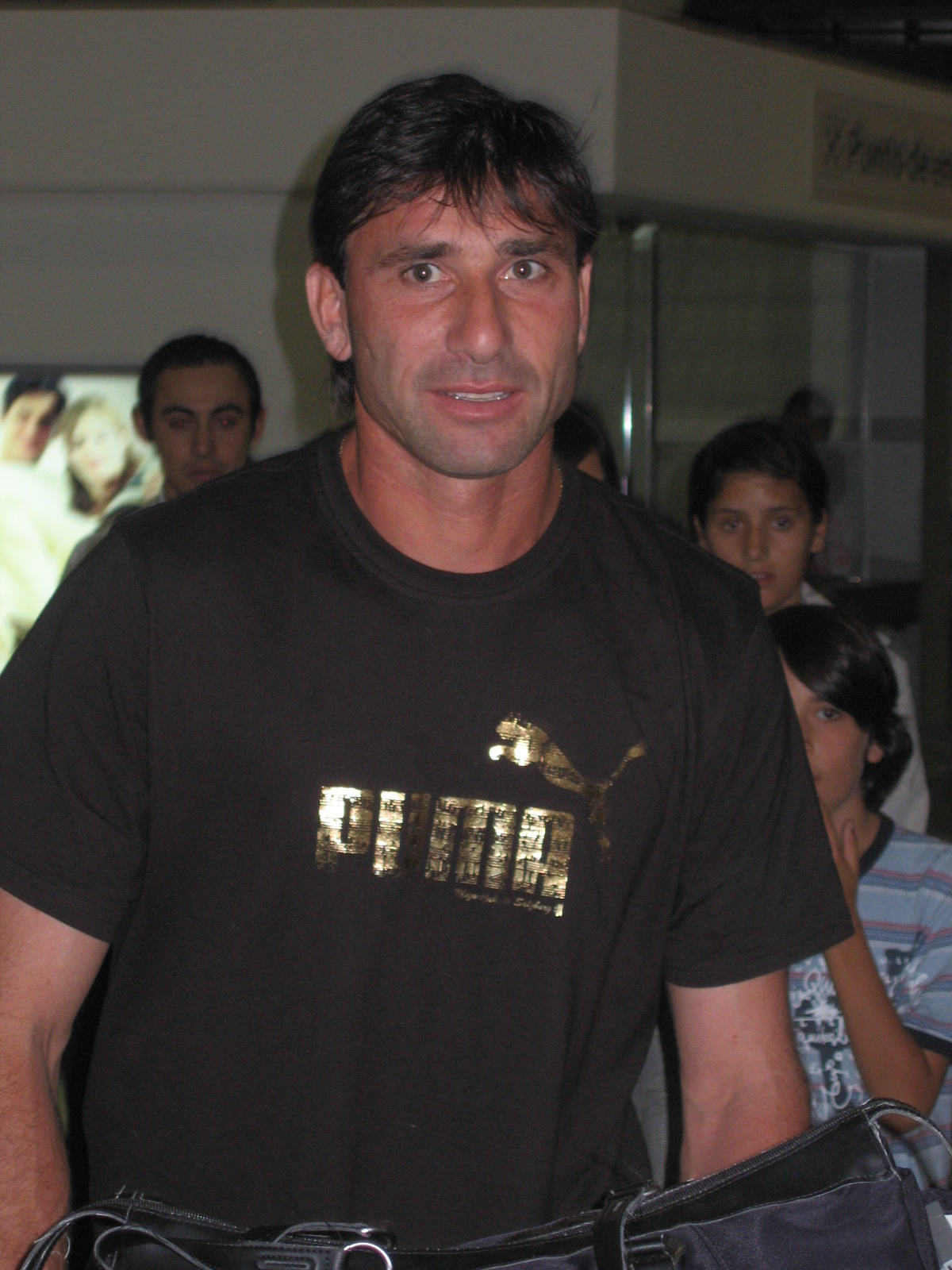
- Abbondanzieri in 2007

Personal information
- Full name: Roberto Carlos Abbondanzieri
- Birth name: Roberto Carlos Abbondancieri
- Date of birth: 19 August 1972 (age 54)
- Place of birth: Bouquet, Argentina
- Height: 1.86 m (6 ft 1 in)
- Position: Goalkeeper

Youth career
- Rosario Central

Senior career*
Years	Team	Apps	(Gls)
1994–1996	Rosario Central	57	(0)
1996–2006	Boca Juniors	204	(0)
2006–2009	Getafe	83	(0)
2009–2010	Boca Juniors	22	(0)
2010	Internacional	18	(0)
Total		384	(0)

International career
1989	Argentina U-17	3	(0)
2004–2008	Argentina	49	(0)

Managerial career
- 2012–2013: Godoy Cruz (assistant)
- 2014–2015: Arsenal de Sarandí (assistant)
- 2016–2018: Unión Española (assistant)
- 2019: Pachuca (assistant)
- 2020–2021: Curicó Unido (assistant)
- * Club domestic league appearances and goals

Roberto Carlos Abbondanzieri (né Abbondancieri, born 19 August 1972), nicknamed El Pato (The Duck), is an Argentine former professional footballer who played as a goalkeeper.

He spent most of his career for the Boca Juniors in his homeland, as well as Getafe of La Liga. After his retirement, he took up coaching.

Abbondanzieri earned 49 caps for the Argentina national football team from 2004 to 2008, playing at two Copa America tournaments and the 2006 FIFA World Cup.

He changed his surname from Abbondancieri to Abbondanzieri when he applied for and obtained his Italian citizenship by descent.

== Club career ==
=== Early career ===
Born in Bouquet, Santa Fe, Abbondanzieri's professional debut took place on 6 December 1994 at Santa Fe's Rosario Central, with whom he would soon after winning the 1995 CONMEBOL Cup. He played with the club until 1997, when he moved to Boca Juniors to be the reserve goalkeeper.

Abbondanzieri trained in the shadow of Óscar Córdoba until the Colombian goalie suffered an injury during the Clausura tournament of 1999. However, Abbondanzieri himself then suffered a shoulder injury during a match against River Plate, and the club's third-choice goalkeeper, Cristian Muñoz, took his place. When he recovered from his injury Abbondanzieri was once again Córdoba's understudy until February 2002, when Córdoba moved to Italian club Perugia.

Abbondanzieri changed his name in July 2002 from Abbondancieri, a misspelling that arose at Argentinian customs when his grandfather immigrated there, to the original spelling that he uses today. The name change was prompted by Italian citizenship concerns in the case of his transfer to the European football leagues. He was named South American Goalkeeper of the Year in 2003.

Until September 2006, when Boca achieved their third Recopa Sudamericana, he held the Boca Juniors record of 14 titles, surpassed later by Guillermo Barros Schelotto.

=== Getafe ===
In June 2006, after weeks of speculation, Abbondanzieri signed a three-year contract with Spanish first division Getafe CF, claiming that "it's the right time for me to go to Europe". In his debut season in the Spanish league, he won the Ricardo Zamora Trophy to the best goalkeeper, after conceding only 30 goals in 37 matches.

On 10 April 2008, in a UEFA Cup quarterfinal second-leg match against Bayern Munich, Abbondanzieri made a vital error in extra time, failing to hold a routine ball from a distant free kick. The ball slipped under his legs while in the six-yard box, allowing Bayern striker Luca Toni to tap the ball into the back of the net. Bayern was still in deficit of goals on aggregate, as the score was 2–3 after the goal (3–4 on aggregate), but only five minutes later, Bayern would level the score at 3–3 (4–4 on aggregate) and allow themselves passage to the UEFA Cup semifinals via the away goals rule.

=== Return to South America ===
Abbondanzieri continued with Getafe for the first half of the 2008–2009 season, but at his request was transferred back to Boca Juniors for the 2009 Clausura tournament. "El Pato" was again Boca's number one and competed in the Clausura, although Boca only finished in 14th. He also participated in the Copa Libertadores, where Boca fell to Defensor Sporting of Uruguay in the round of 16.

On 16 February 2010, Internacional signed the Argentine goalkeeper "Pato" from Boca Juniors. Abbondanzieri retired on 18 December after the match against Seongnam for the third place of FIFA Club World Cup. Internacional won 4–2.

== International career ==
As a youth, Abbondanzieri represented Argentina in the 1989 FIFA U-17 World Championship.

Since then, he became a continuous presence in Boca's goal and, in June 2004, he became the goalkeeper for the Argentina national team and has since played in the Copa América 2004 and the South American Qualification for the 2006 FIFA World Cup.

On 6 May 2006, he was named as a definite squad member for the 2006 World Cup by coach José Pekerman.

On 30 June 2006, he was injured in the World Cup quarter-finals against hosts Germany, after Argentina had taken a 1–0 lead. German striker Miroslav Klose jumped up high for a header while running and collided with Abbondanzieri, with Klose's right leg hitting the Argentinian keeper in the chest. Klose, who had looked sideways to watch for the ball in the moments leading up to the collision and thus may not have seen Abbondanzieri, received no penalty. Abbondanzieri continued at first but had to be carried off on a stretcher some minutes later, to be replaced by Leo Franco, who later failed to save Klose's equalizing strike in the 80th minute, and the four penalty kicks in the ensuing penalty shootout, which Argentina lost 2–4.

His strong performances at the World Cup ensured he continued to be Argentina's first choice goalkeeper under Alfio Basile following the 2006 World Cup. He played all six games at the 2007 Copa América in Venezuela as Argentina reached the final, only to lose to Brazil 3–0. He remained Basile's goalkeeper through the early stages of qualifying for the 2010 World Cup in South Africa but was forced out injured during a 1–1 draw at home to Paraguay. After recovering from his injury, Basile had been replaced by Diego Maradona, who left Abbondanzieri off the squad, with a total of 46 caps for his country.

== Coaching career ==
In November 2012, Abbondanzieri was named as assistant to his former Boca teammate Martín Palermo when he was hired by Godoy Cruz. In April 2014, the pair and Rolando Schiavi took the same job at Arsenal de Sarandí.

Abbondanzieri and Palermo moved to Chile to manage Unión Española in May 2016.

On 28 November 2020, Abbondanzieri was appointed as assistant coach at Chilean club Curicó Unido, once again under Martín Palermo. However, at the end of May 2021, Abbondanzieri announced that he would step back from football to spend more time with his family.

== Personal life ==
Abbondanzieri shares his nickname with another renowned Argentine goalkeeper, Ubaldo Fillol. After stepping away from coaching, Abbondanzieri has since been living a relatively quiet life and now works as an agricultural producer and rural contractor near his hometown of Bouquet.

== Career statistics ==
=== Club ===
Appearances and goals by club, season and competition
Club	Season	League			State league		Cup		Continental		Other		Total	
Club	Season	Division	Apps	Goals	Apps	Goals	Apps	Goals	Apps	Goals	Apps	Goals	Apps	Goals
Rosario Central	1994–95	Primera División	14	0	—		—		—		—		14	0
Rosario Central	1995–96	Primera División	25	0	—		—		—		—		25	0
Rosario Central	1996–97	Primera División	18	0	—		—		—		—		18	0
Rosario Central	Total		57	0	—		—		—		—		57	0
Boca Juniors	1996–97	Primera División	8	0	—		—		—		—		8	0
Boca Juniors	1997–98	Primera División	13	0	—		—		5	0	—		18	0
Boca Juniors	1998–99	Primera División	8	0	—		—		1	0	—		9	0
Boca Juniors	1999–2000	Primera División	8	0	—		—		—		—		8	0
Boca Juniors	2000–01	Primera División	16	0	—		—		7	0	—		23	0
Boca Juniors	2001–02	Primera División	22	0	—		—		12	0	—		34	0
Boca Juniors	2002–03	Primera División	33	0	—		—		14	0	—		47	0
Boca Juniors	2003–04	Primera División	32	0	—		—		22	0	—		54	0
Boca Juniors	2004–05	Primera División	31	0	—		—		20	0	—		51	0
Boca Juniors	2005–06	Primera División	33	0	—		—		—		—		33	0
Boca Juniors	Total		204	0	—		—		71	0	—		275	0
Getafe	2006–07	La Liga	36	0	—		0	0	—		—		36	0
Getafe	2007–08	La Liga	34	0	—		0	0	2	0	—		36	0
Getafe	2008–09	La Liga	13	0	—		0	0	—		—		13	0
Getafe	Total		83	0	—		0	0	2	0	—		85	0
Boca Juniors	2008–09	Primera División	19	0	—		—		8	0	—		27	0
Boca Juniors	2009–10	Primera División	9	0	—		—		1	0	—		10	0
Boca Juniors	Total		28	0	—		—		9	0	—		37	0
Internacional	2010	Série A	8	0	10	0	0	0	10	0	1	0	29	0
Career total			380	0	10	0	0	0	92	0	1	0	475	0

=== International ===
Appearances and goals by national team and year

National team	Year	Apps	Goals
Argentina	2004	11	0
Argentina	2005	9	0
Argentina	2006	9	0
Argentina	2007	14	0
Argentina	2008	6	0
Total		49	0

== Honours ==
Rosario Central

- Copa CONMEBOL: 1995

Boca Juniors

- Primera División: 1998 Apertura, 1999 Clausura, 2000 Apertura, 2003 Apertura, 2005 Apertura, 2006 Clausura
- Copa Libertadores: 2000, 2001, 2003, runner up: 2004
- Copa Sudamericana: 2004, 2005
- Recopa Sudamericana: 2005
- Intercontinental Cup: 2000, 2003

Internacional

- Copa Libertadores: 2010

Individual

- South America Best goalkeeper in South America 2003
- Copa Sudamericana Best goalkeeper 2005
- Copa Sudamericana Best Player of the Final 2005
- Ricardo Zamora Trophy, best goalkeeper of La Liga: 2006–07
- Top 10 Goalkeeper of the 21st Century (IFFHS): 2001–2011
