= Raúl Osella =

Argentine footballer

Personal information
- Full name: Raúl Alberto Osella
- Date of birth: June 8, 1984 (age 42)
- Place of birth: Morteros, Argentina
- Height: 1.77 m (5 ft 10 in)
- Positions: Right back; defender

Team information
- Current team: FC Locarno
- Number: 29

Youth career
- Boca Juniors

Senior career*
Years	Team	Apps	(Gls)
2003–2004	Boca Juniors	1	(0)
2004–2005	Tiro Federal	15	(0)
2005–2006	Oggiono	?	(?)
2007–2009	FC Locarno	47	(4)
2010	Tiro Federal	20	(1)
2010–2013	Tiro Federal y Deportivo Morteros	123	(1)
2013–	FC Locarno	10	(0)

International career
1999–2002	Argentina U17	5	(0)
- * Club domestic league appearances and goals as of 07:41, 23 October 2013 (UTC)

Raúl Alberto Osella (born 8 June 1984 in Morteros) is an Argentine association footballer who currently plays for FC Locarno in Swiss Challenge League. He played FIFA U-17 World Cup Final for Argentina national team 2001. He played for Boca Juniors and Tiro Federal in Argentina.

He also holds Italian passport.
