= Michele Piccolo =

Italian footballer

Personal information
- Date of birth: 1 September 1985 (age 41)
- Place of birth: Badia Polesine, Italy
- Height: 1.76 m (5 ft 9 in)
- Position: Forward

Youth career
- Padova
- 2002–2004: Milan

Senior career*
Years	Team	Apps	(Gls)
2003–2006	Milan	1	(0)
2004	→ Prato (loan)	15	(0)
2005–2006	→ Pizzighettone (loan)	36	(8)
2006–2011	Pizzighettone	123	(31)
2011–2012	Fiorenzuola	37	(16)
2012–2014	Pro Piacenza	60	(22)
2014–2015	Fiorenzuola	33	(8)
2015–2016	ASD Vigor Carpaneto 1922	13	(4)
2016	Crema	18	(5)
2016–2019	ASD Nibbiano & Valtidone		
2019–2020	ASD Calcio Santo Stefano		
Total		336	(94)

International career
2001	Italy U15	1	(0)
2004	Italy U19	2	(1)

Managerial career
- 2024: Crema
- 2024–2025: Piacenza U19
- 2025–: Crema
- * Club domestic league appearances and goals

Michele Piccolo (born 1 September 1985) is an Italian manager and former footballer who is currently as a head coach for Italian Serie D club Crema.

== Career ==
=== A.C. Milan ===
Born in Badia Polesine, Veneto, Piccolo started his career at Veneto club Padova, about 50 km from his birthplace. In September 2002, he joined Milan youth teams. He played his first and only match for A.C. Milan's first team on 24 May 2003, the last Serie A match of the season and the match before the 2003 UEFA Champions League Final and 2003 Coppa Italia Final. In the match, he partnered with Alessandro Matri, and neither one scored. The match ended with a 2-4 loss to Piacenza as Milan almost rested all the regular starters.

In the next season, he played all the time at Primavera (U20) Team and did not play in the first team. In the 2004-05 season, he left on loan to Prato of Serie C1 along with Matri but in mid-season joined Pizzighettone at Serie C2.

=== Pizzighettone ===
Piccolo joined Pizzighettone in January 2005 and followed the team promoted to Serie C1 in 2005. He played 28 league matches and scored 6 goals in the 2005–06 Serie C1 season, and the club decided to sign him in a co-ownership deal in 2006, for a peppercorn fee of €1,000. In 2006-07 season, Piccolo only played 8 league matches. After the club was relegated back to Serie C2 at the end of the season, the club signed him permanently from Milan. Piccolo then played 42 league matches in two seasons and followed the club as it was relegated to Serie D (non-professional) in 2009.

=== Fiorenzuola ===
Piccolo joined Fiorenzuola of Serie D in the 2011-2012 and 2014-2015 seasons.

=== Pro Piacenza ===
Piccolo joined BP Pro Piacenza of Serie D in the 2012-2013 and 2014-2015 seasons.

=== Vigor Carpaneto ===
Piccolo joined Vigor Carpaneto of Eccellenza in the 2015-2016 season, where he remained until January.

=== Crema 1908 ===
Piccolo joined Crema 1908 of Eccellenza in the 2015-2016 season from January to the end of the championship.

=== Nibbiano & Valtidone ===
Piccolo joined Nibbiano & Valtidone of Eccellenza in Emilia-Romagna in the 2016-2017 season.

=== San Colombano ===
Piccolo joined San Colombano of Eccellenza in Lombardia in the 2017-2018 season.

=== Retirement ===
After playing in San Colombano, he later retired and started his career as a P.E. teacher
