= Emerson Panigutti =

Argentine footballer

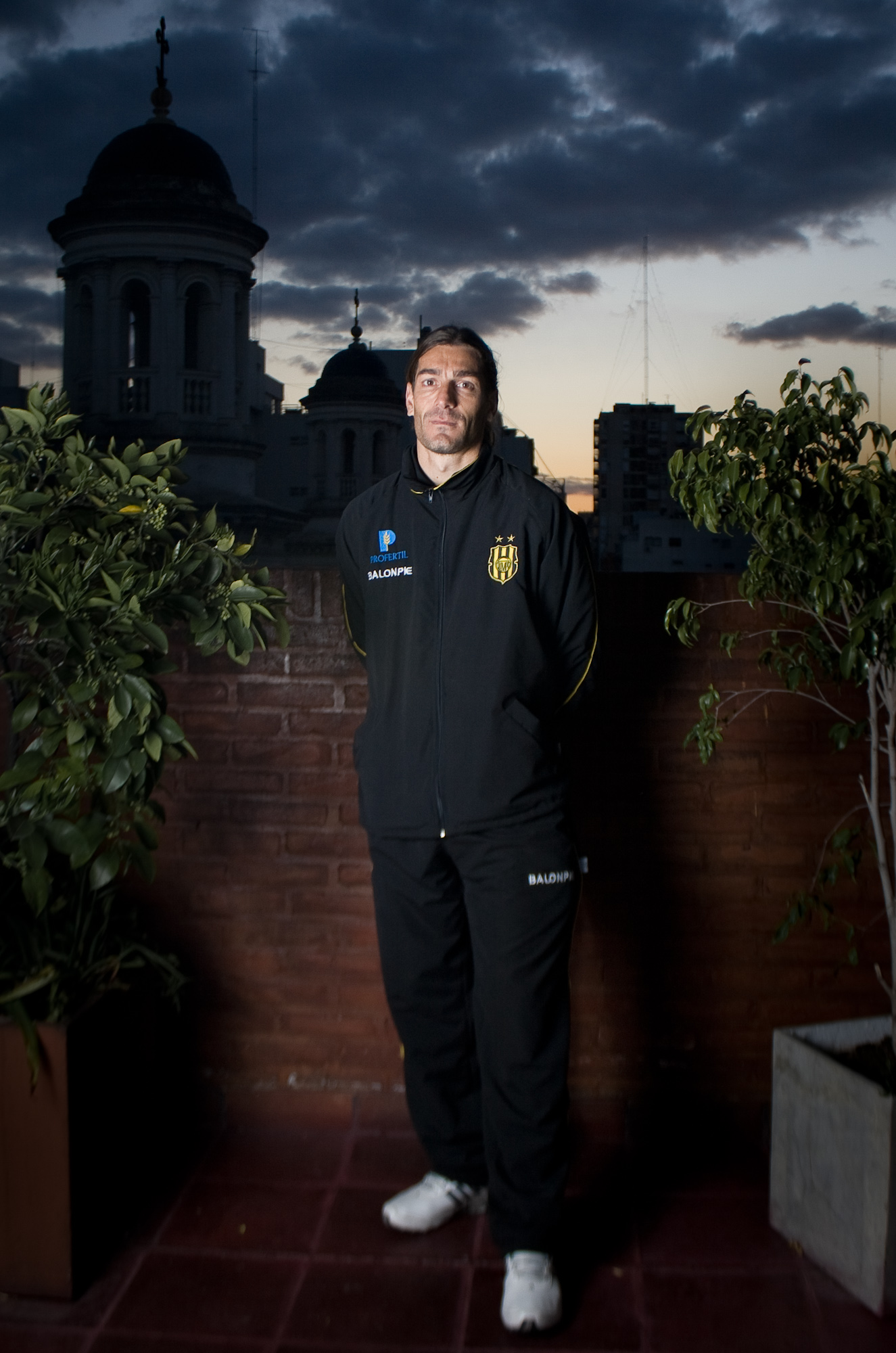

Personal information
- Full name: Emerson Mariano Panigutti
- Date of birth: February 13, 1976 (age 50)
- Place of birth: Hercilia, Argentina
- Height: 1.78 m (5 ft 10 in)
- Position: Forward

Senior career*
Years	Team	Apps	(Gls)
1996–1997	Ferro Carril Oeste	4	(0)
1997–1998	Sportivo Italiano	14	(3)
2000–2001	Estudiantes de Mérida	48	(20)
2001	Nacional Táchira	16	(4)
2002	Deportes Tolima	17	(2)
2003	Kuala Lumpur FA	13	(9)
2003	Mérida Mexico	14	(3)
2004	Deportivo Táchira	8	(3)
2004	Alianza Atletico Sullana	15	(3)
2005	Deportivo Quito	18	(6)
2005–2006	Universidad Católica (Quito)	30	(17)
2006	Ben Hur	13	(4)
2007–2008	Olympiakos Nicosia	31	(8)
2008–2009	Deportivo Anzoátegui	24	(8)
2009–2010	Deportivo Italia	?	(4)
2010	Olimpo	1	(0)
- * Club domestic league appearances and goals

Emerson Panigutti (born February 13, 1976) is a retired Argentine footballer.

Panigutti is a classic example of the international journeyman footballer. He has played for fifteen teams in eight countries.

== Career ==
After 12 years playing abroad and in the lower leagues of Argentina, Panigutti returned to the Argentine first division for the 2010–11 season, signing with Olimpo.
