= Raúl Estévez =

Argentine footballer (born 1978)

Personal information
- Full name: Raúl Enrique Estévez
- Date of birth: 21 January 1978 (age 48)
- Place of birth: Lomas de Zamora, Argentina
- Height: 1.72 m (5 ft 8 in)
- Position: Winger

Youth career
- San Lorenzo

Senior career*
Years	Team	Apps	(Gls)
1995–2002	San Lorenzo	128	(15)
2002–2004	Boca Juniors	31	(1)
2004	Botafogo	8	(1)
2004–2005	Colón	26	(3)
2005–2006	Racing Club	27	(2)
2006–2007	Académica	3	(0)
2008	Universidad de Chile	38	(9)
2009–2011	Unión Española	75	(4)
2013–2014	Boca Unidos	25	(5)
2015	Barracas Central	15	(1)
Total		376	(41)
- * Club domestic league appearances and goals

Raúl Enrique Estévez (born 21 January 1978 in Lomas de Zamora, Argentina) is a retired Argentine footballer.

Estévez, nicknamed "El Pipa", has played for San Lorenzo, Boca Juniors, Colón de Santa Fe, and Racing Club of Argentina; Botafogo of Brazil; and Universidad de Chile and Unión Española of Chile.

== Career ==
=== Argentina and Brazil ===
He started his career at Club Atlético San Lorenzo de Almagro in Argentina.

In 1995, he was promoted to the first team. He made his first-team debut that same year. In 2001, San Lorenzo won the Torneo Clausura 2001 and the Copa Mercosur.

In 2003, he signed with Boca Juniors. That year, the team won a national and an international tournament, Torneo Clausura 2003 and Copa Libertadores.

In 2004, he signed with Botafogo in Brazil where he remained for the first half of the season. In the middle of the year, Estévez returned to Argentina and signed with Colón de Santa Fe until the end of season. In 2005, he signed with Racing Club de Avellaneda.

=== Europe ===
In 2006, Estevéz arrived in Europe, to play for Academica de Coimbra in Portugal. However, due to the lack of opportunities during 2007, Estévez abandoned the club, and became a free agent.

=== Chile ===
In 2008, Estevéz accepted an offer to join Universidad de Chile. In the first semester Estévez was not meeting the club's expectations and his future with the club for the second semester was in question. On May 11, Estévez played against O'Higgins where he scored two goals, which secured his place in the second semester. In the second semester Estévez played well, participating in all matches and scoring six goals. However, in December he had problems with the club's management and left the club.

In 2009, he signed for Unión Española for whom he played regularly, nearly winning the Chilean national tournament. In the second semester he scored a goal against Vélez Sarsfield in the Copa Sudamericana.

== Titles ==
- San Lorenzo: 2001 Clausura Primera Division Argentina
- San Lorenzo: 2001 Copa Mercosur
- Boca Juniors: 2003 Apertura Primera Division Argentina
- Boca Juniors: 2003 Copa Libertadores
