= Diego Crosa =

Argentine footballer

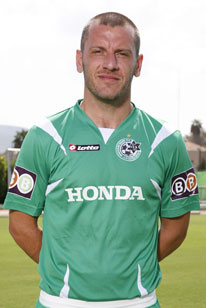
- Crosa with Maccabi Haifa in 2007

Personal information
- Full name: Diego Sebastián Crosa
- Date of birth: April 18, 1976 (age 50)
- Place of birth: Rosario, Argentina
- Position: Defender

Youth career
- Newell's Old Boys

Senior career*
Years	Team	Apps	(Gls)
1994–1999	Newell's Old Boys	116	(2)
1999–2002	Real Betis	29	(0)
2000–2001	→ Vélez Sársfield (loan)	35	(0)
2002	→ Boca Juniors (loan)	8	(1)
2002–2004	Boca Juniors	43	(0)
2004–2007	Racing Club	81	(3)
2007–2008	Maccabi Haifa	29	(0)
2008	→ Colón (loan)	13	(0)
2009–2010	Chacarita Juniors	14	(0)
2010	San Luis	0	(0)

International career
1995	Argentina U20	2	(0)
2000	Argentina	2	(0)
Medal record
Men's football
Representing Argentina
FIFA U-20 World Cup
Winner	1995 Qatar
- * Club domestic league appearances and goals

Diego Sebastián Crosa (born 18 April 1976 in Rosario) is an Argentinian former footballer who played as a defender.

== Career ==
A product of Newell's Old Boys, Crosa moved to Spain and joined Real Betis in 2002. He returned to Argentina to play on loan for Vélez Sársfield in 2000–01 and Boca Juniors in 2002.

Crosa joined permanently Boca Juniors in the second half of 2002 and switched to Racing Club de Avellaneda in July 2004.

In 2007, Crosa moved abroad again and joined Israeli club Maccabi Haifa. The next year, he was loaned out to Colón in his homeland.

He was signed for Chacarita Juniors for the 2009 Apertura tournament where he played with his younger brother, Fernando Crosa, and in 2010 he signed for San Luis Quillota.

At international level, Crosa was part of the Argentina Under-20 squad that won the 1995 FIFA World Youth Championship in Qatar.
