= Pablo Jerez =

Argentine footballer

Personal information
- Full name: Pablo Ezequiel Jeréz
- Date of birth: July 26, 1984 (age 42)
- Place of birth: Morón, Argentina
- Height: 1.74 m (5 ft 9 in)
- Position: Right-back

Team information
- Current team: Boca Juniors (women's management)

Youth career
- Boca Juniors

Senior career*
Years	Team	Apps	(Gls)
2003–2005	Boca Juniors	40	(0)
2005–2008	Colón	41	(0)
2008–2009	→ Tigre (loan)	35	(0)
2009–2010	→ Huracán (loan)	25	(0)
2010–2012	Olimpo	9	(0)
2013–2014	Deportivo Camioneros	14	(1)
2015–2016	San Martín Burzaco	29	(0)
2016–2018	Deportivo Merlo	63	(2)
2018–2019	Ferrocarril Midland	14	(0)

International career
2005	Argentina U-23	4	(0)
- * Club domestic league appearances and goals

Pablo Ezequiel Jerez (born 26 July 1984 in Morón) is a retired Argentine football player who played as a right-back.

== Club career ==
Jerez started his professional career in 2003 with Boca Juniors, he won 4 titles during his two years in the Boca Juniors first team.

In 2005, Jerez left Boca to join Colón de Santa Fe, where he played until 2008. He subsequently transferred to Tigre. After a year playing in Victoria, he returned to Colón for the 2009 Apertura tournament. Jerez joined recently promoted Olimpo de Bahía Blanca for the 2010–11 Argentine Primera División season.

== After retirement ==
After retiring in the summer 2019, Jerez returned to Boca Juniors. His specific task would be to organize and restructure the women's football, acting as a link between the management and the team. As of August 2021, he was still working with women's football at Boca.

== Honours ==
Season	Club	Title
Apertura 2003	Boca Juniors	Argentine Primera División
2003	Boca Juniors	Copa Libertadores
2003	Boca Juniors	Copa Intercontinental
2004	Boca Juniors	Copa Sudamericana
