= Diego Cagna =

Argentine footballer (born 1970)

Personal information
- Full name: Diego Sebastián Cagna
- Date of birth: 19 April 1970 (age 56)
- Place of birth: Buenos Aires, Argentina
- Height: 1.82 m (6 ft 0 in)
- Position: Midfielder

Youth career
- Argentinos Juniors

Senior career*
Years	Team	Apps	(Gls)
1988–1992	Argentinos Juniors	100	(12)
1992–1996	Independiente	117	(13)
1996–1999	Boca Juniors	115	(9)
2000–2002	Villarreal	77	(3)
2002	Celaya	17	(1)
2003–2005	Boca Juniors	82	(7)
Total		508	(45)

International career
1992–1999	Argentina	19	(1)

Managerial career
- 2006–2009: Tigre
- 2010–2011: Colo-Colo
- 2011: Newell's Old Boys
- 2012–2013: Estudiantes
- 2013: Tigre
- 2016–2017: San Martín-T
- 2018: Atlético Bucaramanga
- 2018–2019: Instituto ACC
- 2021: Jorge Wilstermann
Medal record
Men's football
Representing Argentina
FIFA Confederations Cup
Winner	1992 Saudi Arabia
- * Club domestic league appearances and goals

Diego Sebastián Cagna (born 19 April 1970) is an Argentine football coach and former player who played as midfielder.

== Club career ==
Cagna was born in Buenos Aires. His first professional first-division match was in December 1988, with Argentinos Juniors. He transferred to Independiente at the beginning of 1992, where he played for four years.

Cagna then went on to join Boca Juniors from the Apertura 1996 until the end of 1999 when, at 29 years of age and after finishing the Apertura 1999, he moved to La Liga side Villarreal CF. He played two seasons with the Yellow Submarine, and after playing the Apertura 2002 with Primera División de México club Atlético Celaya, he returned to Boca Juniors in 2003 and retired in 2005. In total, Cagna played 255 games for Boca, scoring 21 goals.

== International career ==
With the Argentina national team Cagna won the Confederations Cup 1992, and participated in the Copa América 1999. His only goal for the national team was on 15 April 1998 friendly match against Israel in Jerusalem, which Argentina lost 2–1.

== Managerial career ==
In December 2006, he became Tigre's manager, taking the club to the first division in only one season. Tigre's first year in the major division was successful with Tigre finishing in second place in the Apertura 2007 championship. This was Tigre's highest ever finish in the top division, gaining Cagna notoriety from fans and the sports press.

In the Apertura 2008 championship Tigre finished joint top of the Primera División with Boca Juniors and San Lorenzo. Tigre had the best head-to-head record, San Lorenzo the best goal difference but Boca Juniors won the three-way championship playoff on goal difference after the three teams once again finished level on points.

Cagna then guided Tigre to qualification to an international club competition for the first time in their history at the end of the 2008–09 season. Tigre appeared in the 2009 Copa Sudamericana, where they were eliminated in the first round by San Lorenzo.

Having taken Tigre into the last game of two championship seasons with the possibility of winning the championship and led them to international qualification for the first time in their history, his fortunes turned in the Apertura 2009 where Tigre finished bottom of the table with only 8 points from 19 games prompting his resignation on 14 December 2009 after over three years with the club. The former Chacarita coach replaces on 20 April 2010 Hugo Tocalli as Head Coach by Colo-Colo.

Unfortunately, Cagna's results with the twenty-nine time Chilean champions have been disappointing, losing a 7-point advantage through several games until the end of the 2010 season, finishing runners-up of that tournament (Universidad Católica became finally champions). Moreover, his international appearance in Copa Sudamericana meant another disappointment since "Los Albos" were kicked out in first round home/away leg versus Universitario de Sucre.

== Career statistics ==
Appearances and goals by national team and year
National team	Year	Apps	Goals
Argentina	1992	7	0
Argentina	1993	1	0
Argentina	1994	2	0
Argentina	1995	0	0
Argentina	1996	0	0
Argentina	1997	1	0
Argentina	1998	1	1
Argentina	1999	7	0
Total		19	1

== Honours ==
Independiente

- Argentine Primera División: Clausura 1994
- Recopa Sudamericana: 1995
- Supercopa Libertadores: 1995

Boca Juniors

- Argentine Primera División: Apertura 1998, Clausura 1999, Apertura 2003, Apertura 2005
- Copa Libertadores: 2003
- Copa Sudamericana: 2004, 2005
- Recopa Sudamericana: 2005
- Intercontinental Cup: 2003

Argentina

- FIFA Confederations Cup: 1992
- Pan American Games: 1995
