= Sebastián Battaglia =

Argentine footballer

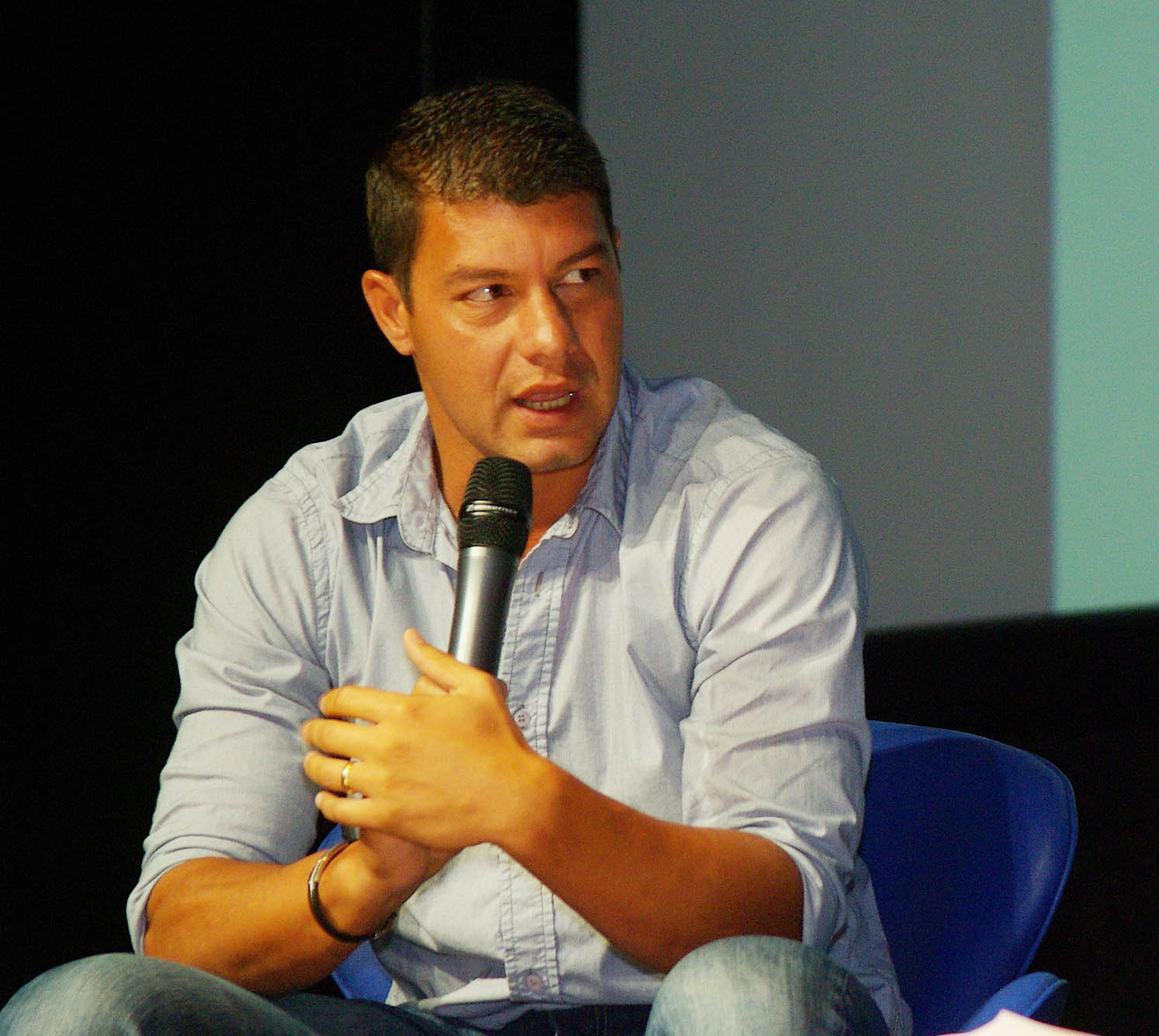
- Battaglia in 2015

Personal information
- Full name: Sebastián Alejandro Battaglia
- Date of birth: 8 November 1980 (age 45)
- Place of birth: Santa Fe, Argentina
- Height: 1.78 m (5 ft 10 in)
- Position: Defensive midfielder

Youth career
- –1998: Boca Juniors

Senior career*
Years	Team	Apps	(Gls)
1998–2003	Boca Juniors	102	(9)
2004–2005	Villarreal	29	(1)
2005–2013	Boca Juniors	122	(9)
Total		252	(19)

International career
2003–2009	Argentina	10	(0)

Managerial career
- 2018: Almagro
- 2018: Banfield (assistant)
- 2020–2021: Boca Juniors II
- 2021–2022: Boca Juniors
- 2023: Huracán
- 2024–2025: San Miguel
- * Club domestic league appearances and goals

Sebastián Alejandro Battaglia (born 8 November 1980) is an Argentine football manager and former player who played as a midfielder. He was recently the manager of San Miguel.

He spent most of his career with Primera División Argentina club Boca Juniors, but also had a brief spell with Spanish side Villarreal. At international level, he made 10 appearances for the Argentina national team between 2003 and 2009. Battaglia has been described in his club profile as displaying good positioning, being a ball-winner and possessing good aerial ability.

Battaglia is the most decorated player in Boca Juniors' history, having won 17 titles with the club between 1998 and 2012. His last championship playing for Boca was the 2011–12 Copa Argentina.

== Club career ==
Even though he was born in Santa Fe Province, Sebastián began his career with the Boca Juniors' reserve team. He made his professional debut on 31 May 1998, and quickly became an important player for Boca Juniors. He played for five years at the club, when in the middle of the 2003–04 season, Villarreal CF of La Liga bought 50% of his contract for €2.8 million and acquired his services. Villarreal was considered an excellent destination for Battaglia as there were already plenty of former Boca players such as Martín Palermo, Juan Román Riquelme, Diego Cagna, Rodolfo Arruabarrena and Fabricio Coloccini at the club.

Battaglia played only a season and a half at Villarreal, and never displayed the form that had made him such a hot property in Argentina. His family also had trouble adjusting to their new life in Spain. After an injury stopped him playing for almost six months, he decided to return with his family to Argentina. In July 2005, after some prolonged negotiations between Boca Juniors and Villarreal, he got his wish.

Back at Boca Juniors he recaptured his old form and started to improve his game, becoming club captain and being called up to the Argentina national team in the World Cup Qualifiers match against Peru on 8 October 2005. He was also a starter in the friendly match against Qatar in November of the same year.

During the 'Torneo de Verano' of 2008, Battaglia scored in the Superclásico against arch rivals River Plate, in a game where which Boca Juniors won 2–0. On 4 May 2008, in the 'Torneo Clausura' Battaglia would again score against River Plate, by heading in a goal from a corner which won Boca the game at 1–0.

On 11 December 2011, Battaglia entered the pitch as a substitute to play the last minutes of the final match of the 2011 Apertura (that Boca Juniors had already won two matches earlier), therefore being part of the title-winning squad. Thus, he became the most successful player in Boca Juniors history, with 18 trophies.

== Coaching and later career ==
On 20 March 2018, Battaglia was appointed manager of Primera Nacional club Club Almagro, following the resignation of Alfredo Grelak. This was his first ever experience as a coach. He made his debut against the Instituto on 21 March in a 0–0 draw. Failing to secure promotion on 11 May, Battaglia was fired.

A week after being fired at Almagro, Battaglia was appointed assistant coach of Julio César Falcioni at Banfield. The duo left the club at the end of 2018.

In the beginning of 2020, Battaglia was appointed manager of Boca Juniors' reserve team. In July 2021, Battaglia was named as an interim replacement for Boca Juniors manager Miguel Ángel Russo, who was in isolation together with the majority of the first team squad, after a defeat to Atletico Mineiro after a player had been tested positive. He was in charge for two games.

On 17 August 2021, Battaglia was named interim manager of Boca until December, after Russo left.

== Career statistics ==
=== International ===
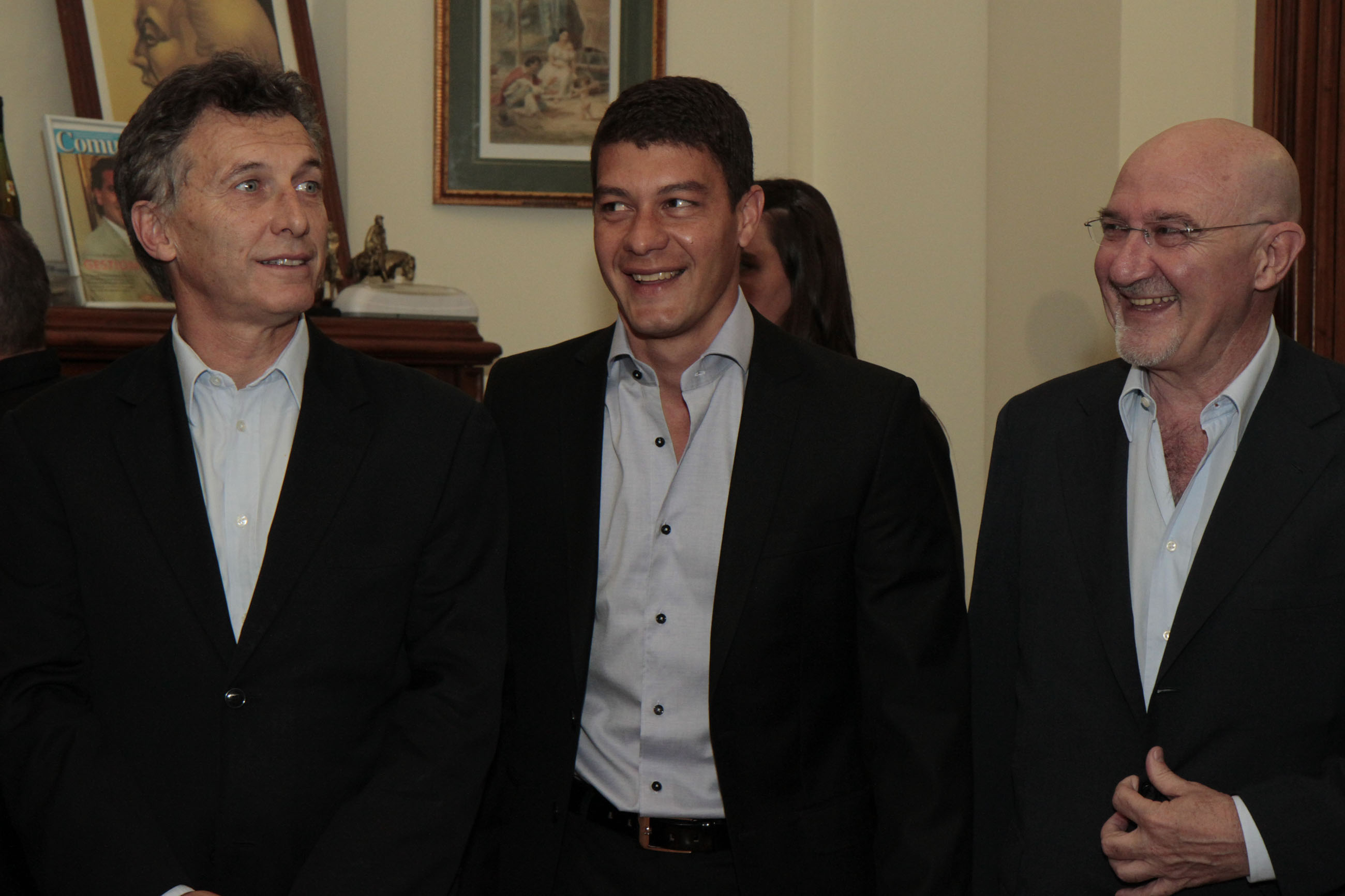
Battaglia with the Chief of Government of Buenos Aires and former Boca Juniors president, Mauricio Macri (left) in 2012.

Argentina national team
Year	Apps	Goals
2003	3	0
2004	0	0
2005	3	0
2006	0	0
2007	0	0
2008	2	0
2009	2	0
Total	10	0

== Managerial statistics ==
As of match played 19 April 2025

Managerial record by team and tenure
Team	Nat	From	To	Record							
Team	Nat	From	To	G	W	D	L	GF	GA	GD	Win %
Almagro	(Argentina)	21 March 2018	11 May 2018	7	3	2	2	8	6	+2	42.86
Boca Juniors	(Argentina)	24 July 2021	27 July 2021	2	0	1	1	0	2	−2	0.00
Boca Juniors	(Argentina)	17 August 2021	6 July 2022	55	29	16	10	79	42	+37	52.73
Huracán	(Argentina)	9 May 2023	28 June 2023	9	0	4	5	3	10	−7	0.00
San Miguel	(Argentina)	2 December 2024	19 April 2025	11	3	5	3	12	10	+2	27.27
Total				84	35	28	21	102	70	+32	41.67

== Honours ==
=== Player ===
Boca Juniors

- Primera División: 1999 Cl, 2000 Ap, 2003 Ap, 2005 Ap, 2006 Cl, 2008 Ap, 2011 Ap
- Copa Argentina: 2011–12
- Copa Libertadores: 2000, 2001, 2003, 2007
- Copa Sudamericana: 2005
- Recopa Sudamericana: 2005, 2006, 2008
- Intercontinental Cup: 2000, 2003

Villarreal

- UEFA Intertoto Cup: 2004

=== Manager ===
Boca Juniors

- Copa Argentina: 2019–20
- Copa de la Liga Profesional: 2022
