= Raúl Cascini =

Argentine footballer (born 1971)

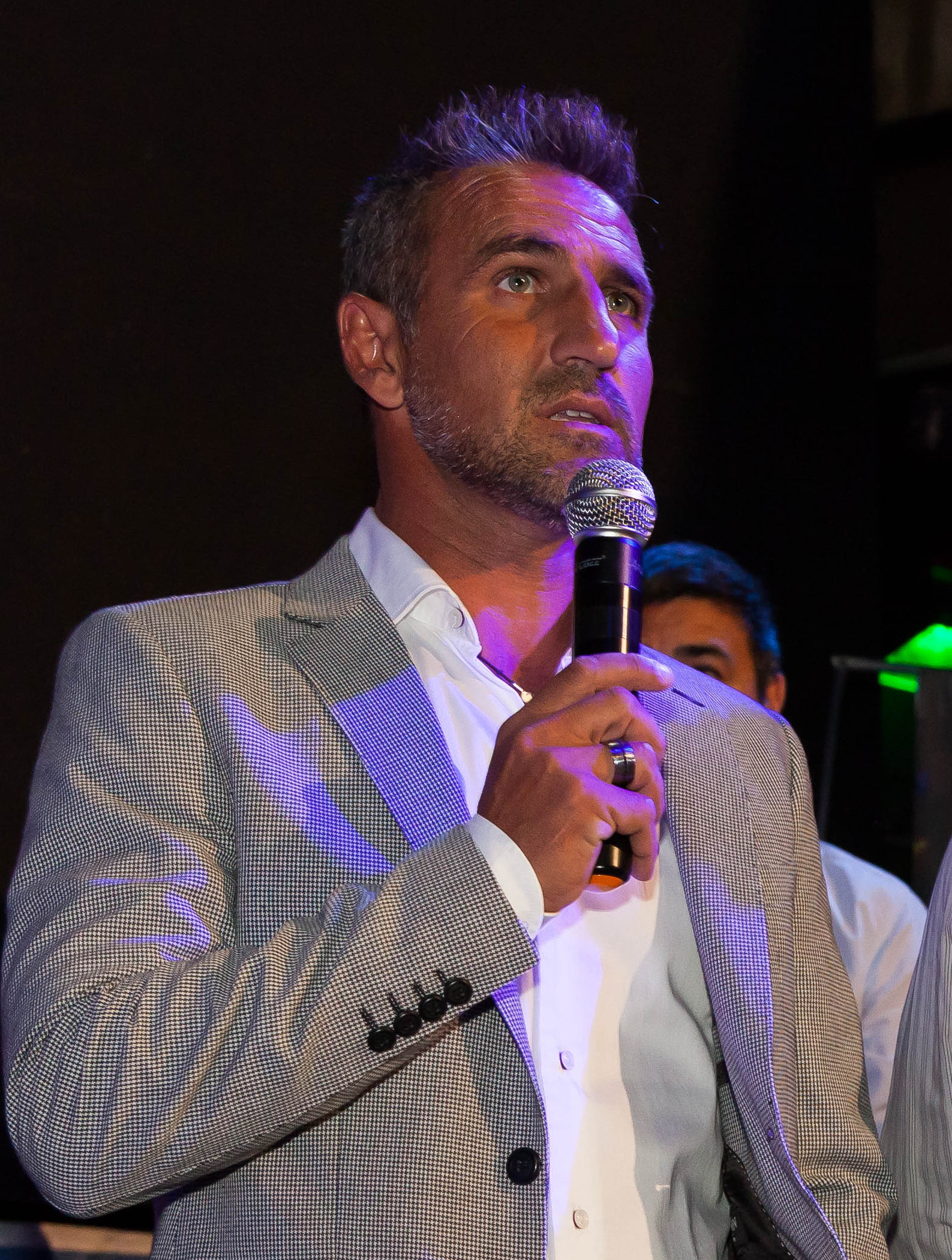
- Cascini in 2015

Personal information
- Full name: Raúl Alfredo Cascini
- Date of birth: 7 April 1971 (age 55)
- Place of birth: San Fernando Buenos Aires, Argentina
- Height: 1.72 m (5 ft 8 in)
- Position: Midfielder

Team information
- Current team: Boca Juniors (technical management)

Senior career*
Years	Team	Apps	(Gls)
1990–1993	Platense	108	(7)
1993–1995	Independiente	48	(0)
1995–1996	Estudiantes	33	(0)
1996–2000	Independiente	112	(3)
2000–2001	Toulouse	29	(1)
2001–2002	Estudiantes	33	(0)
2002–2005	Boca Juniors	72	(1)

Managerial career
- 2011–2012: Los Andes
- * Club domestic league appearances and goals

Raúl Alfredo Cascini (born 7 April 1971) is a former Argentine football midfielder. His first club was Platense and has also played for Estudiantes de La Plata, Independiente and Boca Juniors. After retiring, Cascini worked as a pundit for Fox Sports in Argentina.

In 2001, Independiente owed Cascini money but they agreed Toulouse would cover it. However, Toulouse went bankrupt and were not able to cover the amount so he filed a lawsuit.

At Boca, Cascini played a total of 113 matches and 2 goals in all competitions.

== Coaching career ==
In the summer 2011, Cascini was appointed manager of Los Andes with Marcelo Delgado as his assistant. The duo resigned on 9 September 2012.

On 19 December 2019, when Cascini's friend and former pro-player Juan Román Riquelme was appointed vice-president and head of the football department of Boca Juniors, Cascini also joined the club as a member of Boca Juniors Soccer Council.

== Personal life ==
Raúl Alfredo Cascini's son, Juan Cascini is also a footballer.

== Honours ==
Independiente

- Primera División: 1994 Clausura
- Supercopa Libertadores: 1994, 1995
- Recopa Sudamericana: 1995

Boca Juniors

- Primera División: 2003 Apertura
- Copa Libertadores: 2003
- Copa Sudamericana: 2004
- Intercontinental Cup: 2003
