= Marcelo Delgado =

Argentine footballer

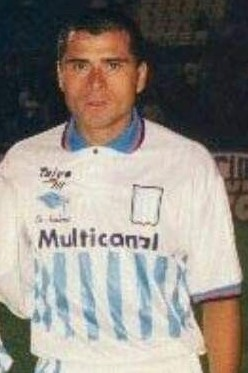
- Delgado in 1998

Personal information
- Full name: Marcelo Alejandro Delgado
- Date of birth: 24 March 1973 (age 53)
- Place of birth: Capitán Bermúdez, Argentina
- Height: 1.73 m (5 ft 8 in)
- Position: Forward

Team information
- Current team: Boca Juniors (technical management)

Youth career
- Defensores de Villa

Senior career*
Years	Team	Apps	(Gls)
1990–1994	Rosario Central	112	(23)
1994–1995	Cruz Azul	28	(5)
1995–1999	Racing Club	118	(39)
2000–2003	Boca Juniors	92	(26)
2003–2004	Cruz Azul	46	(18)
2005–2006	Boca Juniors	35	(5)
2006–2007	Belgrano	14	(4)
2007–2008	Barcelona SC	41	(10)
Total		486	(130)

International career
1991	Argentina U20	2	(1)
1995–2002	Argentina	18	(0)
1996	Argentina Olympic	2	(0)

Managerial career
- 2011–2012: Los Andes (assistant)
Medal record
Representing Argentina
Men's Football
Silver medal – second place	1996 Atlanta	Team competition
- * Club domestic league appearances and goals

Marcelo Alejandro Delgado (born 24 March 1973) is an Argentine former professional footballer, best known for his nickname "Chelo". He usually played as a deep-lying forward. He was capped for Argentina and played at the 1996 Olympic Games and the 1998 FIFA World Cup. He was well known for his technical ability and finishing.

He played for several clubs, including Rosario Central, Racing Club, Boca Juniors, Barcelona SC and Mexican Cruz Azul. His nephew, Lucas, is a professional footballer.

== Coaching and later career ==
In the summer 2011, Delgado was appointed assistant coach to Raúl Alfredo Cascini at Los Andes. The duo resigned on 9 September 2012.

In 2013, Delgado had a short spell at amateur club For ever. In 2016, Delgado played a few matches for his childhood club Defensores de Villa.

On 19 December 2019, when his close friend and former pro-player Juan Román Riquelme was appointed vice-president and head of the football department of Boca Juniors, Delgado also joined the club as a member of Boca Juniors Soccer Council.

== Career statistics ==
Appearances and goals by national team and year
National team	Year	Apps	Goals
Argentina	1995	2	0
Argentina	1996	1	0
Argentina	1997	5	0
Argentina	1998	6	0
Argentina	1999	0	0
Argentina	2000	2	0
Argentina	2001	1	0
Argentina	2002	1	0
Total		18	0

== Honours ==
Boca Juniors

- Primera División: 2000 Apertura, 2005 Apertura, 2006 Clausura
- Copa Libertadores: 2000, 2001, 2003
- Copa Sudamericana: 2005
- Recopa Sudamericana: 2005, 2006
- Intercontinental Cup: 2000

Argentina

- Olympic Silver Medal: 1996
