= Javier Villarreal =

Argentine footballer

Personal information
- Full name: Javier Alejandro Villarreal
- Date of birth: March 1, 1979 (age 47)
- Place of birth: Alta Gracia, Argentina
- Height: 1.72 m (5 ft 7 1/2 in)
- Position: Midfielder

Senior career*
Years	Team	Apps	(Gls)
1998–1999	Talleres	27	(1)
1999–2000	Belgrano	34	(1)
2000	Córdoba CF	5	(0)
2001–2004	Boca Juniors	43	(6)
2004	Grasshoppers	13	(0)
2005	Colón	17	(1)
2005	Racing Club	16	(1)
2006	Libertad	31	(2)
2007–2008	Banfield	44	(2)
2008–2011	Cerro Porteño	?	(8)
2012	Nacional Asunción	7	(0)
2012	Talleres	34	(0)
- * Club domestic league appearances and goals

Javier Alejandro Villarreal (born 1 March 1979 in Alta Gracia, Córdoba Province) is an Argentine football midfielder.

== Career ==
Villarreal started his career in 1996 at Talleres de Córdoba in the Argentine Primera B Nacional. In 1998 the club were promoted to the Primera División. In 1999, he was sold to local rivals Club Atlético Belgrano.

In 2000, he moved to Spain to play for Córdoba CF. However, the move did not work out and he returned to Argentina to play for Boca Juniors. He won two titles with the club, including two Copa Libertadores. In 2004, he joined Grasshoppers on Switzerland. But again his time in European football was brief. He returned to Argentina in 2005 to play for Colón de Santa Fe and then Racing Club.

In 2006, he joined Libertad in Paraguay where he was part of the squad that won the Paraguayan Primera División. At the end of 2006 he joined Banfield.

In June of the year 2012 he came back to Talleres for the season 2012/2013 in the Torneo Argentino A

== Honours ==
Season	Club	Title
2001	Boca Juniors	Copa Libertadores
Apertura 2003	Boca Juniors	Argentine Primera División
2003	Boca Juniors	Copa Libertadores
2003	Boca Juniors	Intercontinental Cup
2006	Club Libertad	Paraguayan Primera División
2012-13	Talleres	Torneo Argentino A
