= Rolando Schiavi =

Argentine footballer

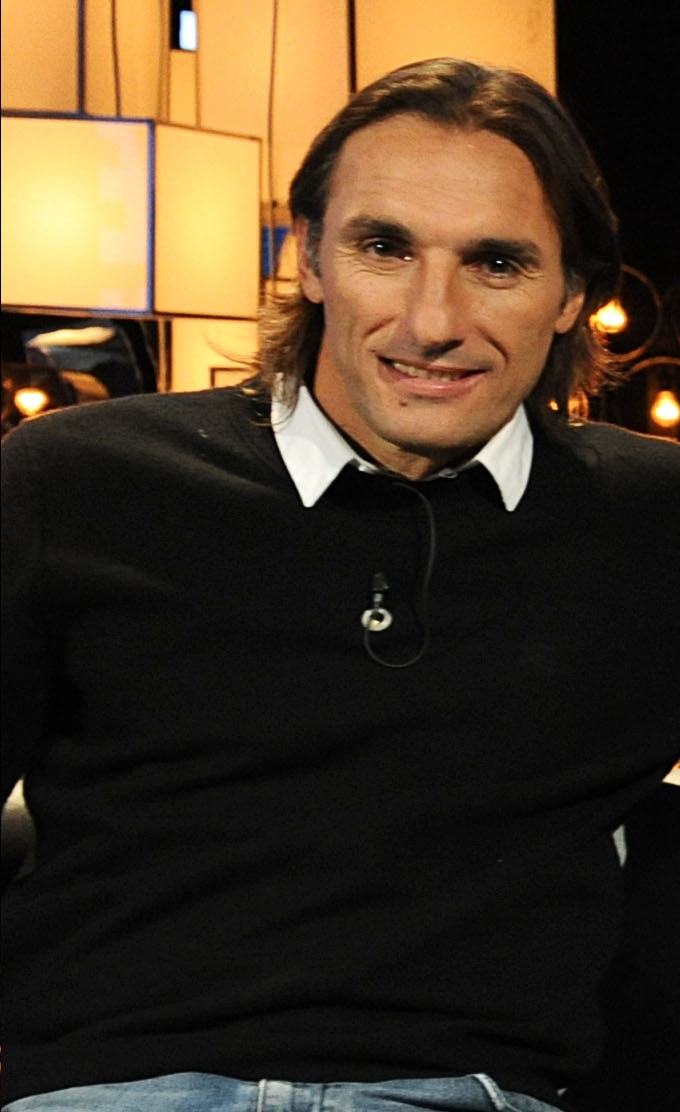
- Schiavi in 2014

Personal information
- Full name: Rolando Carlos Schiavi
- Date of birth: January 18, 1973 (age 53)
- Place of birth: Lincoln, Buenos Aires, Argentina
- Height: 1.91 m (6 ft 3 in)
- Position: Centre back

Youth career
- Club Rivadavia

Senior career*
Years	Team	Apps	(Gls)
1993–1995	Argentino de Rosario	17	(2)
1995–2001	Argentinos Juniors	177	(11)
2001–2005	Boca Juniors	121	(13)
2006	Hércules	33	(1)
2007	Grêmio	11	(0)
2007–2011	Newell's Old Boys	109	(18)
2009	→ Estudiantes LP (loan)	4	(0)
2011–2012	Boca Juniors	67	(5)
2013	Shanghai Shenhua	26	(0)
2014	Club Rivadavia	3	(0)
Total		568	(51)

International career
2009	Argentina	4	(0)

Managerial career
- 2014: Arsenal de Sarandí (assistant)
- 2015–2019: Boca Juniors II
- * Club domestic league appearances and goals

Rolando Carlos Schiavi (Spanish pronunciation: [roˈlando esˈkjaβi]; born 18 January 1973) is an Argentine retired football defender, most recognized for his time spent playing for Boca Juniors.

== Club career ==
Schiavi started his career in the lower leagues with Argentino de Rosario, before moving to Argentinos Juniors in 1995. Schiavi played for Argentinos for six years, before joining Boca Juniors. He played 186 games for Boca between 2001 and 2005, scoring 22 goals, including 122 league games with 12 goals. During his tenure at Boca, Schiavi won seven major titles and one minor title.

In 2006, Boca transferred Schiavi to Spanish club Hércules CF for €550,000. The Spanish episode was short, as Schiavi returned to South America to join Brazilian club Grêmio in 2007.

During the June–July 2007 transfer window, Schiavi returned to Argentina to sign for Newell's Old Boys. On 2 November 2008, the defender scored the decisive penalty in a 1–0 win over Rosario Central in the Rosario derby.

On 22 June 2009, Newells' Old Boys agreed to loan Schiavi to Estudiantes de La Plata for their upcoming Copa Libertadores matches. Per the agreement, Estudiantes paid Newell's US$100,000 plus insurance and the player's wages. Schiavi played in both legs of the semifinal and of the final to help Estudiantes win the Copa Libertadores title.

== International career ==
In September 2009, Schiavi was called up for the first time to the Argentina national football team prior to a World Cup qualifier match against Brazil. He made his debut coming on as an 80th-minute substitute for Sebastián Domínguez in a 1–0 defeat against Paraguay.

== Coaching career ==
After retiring, Shiavi was appointed assistant coach of Martín Palermo at Arsenal de Sarandí in April 2014. He left the position at the end of the year.

On 9 January 2015, Schiavi was appointed reserve team manager of Boca Juniors. He was fired in December 2019.

== Honours ==
Boca Juniors

- Argentine Primera División: 2003 Apertura, 2005 Apertura, 2011 Apertura
- Copa Argentina: 2012
- Copa Libertadores: 2003
- Copa Sudamericana: 2004, 2005
- Recopa Sudamericana: 2005
- Intercontinental Cup: 2003

Grêmio

- Campeonato Gaúcho: 2007

Estudiantes

- Copa Libertadores: 2009
