= 2003 Copa Libertadores =

44th season of Copa Libertadores

2003 Copa Libertadores de América
2003 Copa Toyota Libertadores de América 2003 Copa Toyota Libertadores da América

Tournament details
- Dates: 4 February – 2 July
- Teams: 32 (from 11 associations)

Final positions
- Champions: (Argentina) Boca Juniors (5th title)
- Runners-up: (Brazil) Santos

Tournament statistics
- Matches played: 126
- Goals scored: 371 (2.94 per match)
- Top scorer(s): (Argentina) Marcelo Delgado (Brazil) Ricardo Oliveira (9 goals each)

The 2003 Copa Libertadores de América (officially the 2003 Copa Toyota Libertadores de América for sponsorship reasons) was the 44th edition of the Copa Libertadores, CONMEBOL's premier annual international club tournament.

The tournament was won by Boca Juniors after defeating Santos in a rematch of the 1963 Copa Libertadores Finals. With this title, Boca Juniors achieved their fifth Copa Libertadores title and third in four years.

== Pre-Libertadores ==
From 1998 to 2002, Mexican and Venezuelan clubs played a mini tournament known as Copa Pre Libertadores to determine two teams that would qualify to the next year's Copa Libertadores group stage. In 2002 Pumas UNAM participated in the Pre Libertadores trying to earn a spot in the 2003 edition of the tournament.

Pos	Team	Pld	W	D	L	GF	GA	GD	Pts	Qualification	UNM	CAZ	EST	TAC
1	(Mexico) Pumas UNAM	6	4	1	1	12	4	+8	13	Advance to group stage		1–1	3–1	4–0
2	(Mexico) Cruz Azul	6	3	2	1	11	7	+4	11	Advance to group stage	0–2		2–1	4–0
3	(Venezuela) Estudiantes de Mérida	6	2	1	3	7	9	−2	7		1–0	1–1		1–0
4	(Venezuela) Nacional Táchira	6	1	0	5	6	16	−10	3		1–2	2–3	3–2	

Source: CONMEBOL
Legend: Blue = home team win; Yellow = draw; Red = away team win.

22 October 2002	Estudiantes de Mérida (Venezuela)	1–0	(Mexico) Pumas UNAM	Mérida, Venezuela
16:00	Panigutti 70'	Report		Stadium: Estadio Guillermo Soto Rosa; Referee: Eduardo Lecca (Peru)

24 October 2002	Nacional Táchira (Venezuela)	1–2	(Mexico) Pumas UNAM	Mérida, Venezuela
16:00	Clóvis Bento 15'	Report	Beltrán 77'; A. González 85'	Stadium: Estadio Guillermo Soto Rosa; Referee: Víctor Rivera (Peru)

29 October 2002	Estudiantes de Mérida (Venezuela)	1–1	(Mexico) Cruz Azul	Mérida, Venezuela
16:00	Vielma 69'	Report	Zepeda 36'	Stadium: Estadio Guillermo Soto Rosa; Referee: Mauricio Reinoso (Ecuador)

31 October 2002	Nacional Táchira (Venezuela)	2–3	(Mexico) Cruz Azul	Mérida, Venezuela
16:00	Clóvis Bento 42'; Giovanni Daniel 90+2'	Report	Pinheiro 55'; Messera 69'; Cacho 79'	Stadium: Estadio Guillermo Soto Rosa; Referee: Pedro Ramos (Ecuador)

6 November 2002	Pumas UNAM (Mexico)	1–1	(Mexico) Cruz Azul	Mexico City, Mexico
	P. Campos 43' (o.g.)	Report	Ledesma 40'	Stadium: Estadio Olímpico Universitario; Referee: Gilberto Alcalá (Mexico)

12 November 2002	Pumas UNAM (Mexico)	3–1	(Venezuela) Estudiantes de Mérida	Mexico City, Mexico
16:00	A. González 23', 90'; J. López 28'	Report	Panigutti 46'	Stadium: Estadio Olímpico Universitario; Referee: Fernando Paneso (Colombia)

14 November 2002	Cruz Azul (Mexico)	2–1	(Venezuela) Estudiantes de Mérida	Mexico City, Mexico
16:00	Abreu 44'; Pinheiro 77'	Report	Panigutti 26'	Stadium: Estadio Azul; Referee: Felipe Russi (Colombia)

19 November 2002	Pumas UNAM (Mexico)	4–0	(Venezuela) Nacional Táchira	Mexico City, Mexico
16:00	L. González 17'; J. López 46'; Lozano 57'; Trujillo 71' (pen.)	Report		Stadium: Estadio Olímpico Universitario; Referee: Rubén Selman (Chile)

21 November 2002	Cruz Azul (Mexico)	4–0	(Venezuela) Nacional Táchira	Mexico City, Mexico
16:00	Abreu 9', 21', 22'; Gutiérrez 62'	Report		Stadium: Estadio Azul; Referee: Carlos Chandía (Chile)

28 November 2002	Cruz Azul (Mexico)	0–2	(Mexico) Pumas UNAM	Mexico City, Mexico
		Report	Fonseca 51'; España 90+2'	Stadium: Estadio Azul; Referee: Felipe Ramos Rizo (Mexico)

== Group stage ==
=== Group 1 ===
Pos	Team	Pld	W	D	L	GF	GA	GD	Pts	CAL	RIV	LIB	EME
1	(Colombia) Deportivo Cali	6	4	0	2	9	3	+6	12		2–0	1–0	2–1
2	(Argentina) River Plate	6	4	0	2	10	7	+3	12	2–1		3–1	2–0
3	(Paraguay) Libertad	6	2	1	3	9	9	0	7	1–0	0–2		2–2
4	(Ecuador) Emelec	6	1	1	4	6	15	−9	4	0–4	3–1	1–5	

Legend: Blue = home team win; Yellow = draw; Red = away team win.

=== Group 2 ===
Pos	Team	Pld	W	D	L	GF	GA	GD	Pts	PAY	CER	SC	UC
1	(Brazil) Paysandu	6	4	2	0	14	5	+9	14		0–0	2–1	3–1
2	(Paraguay) Cerro Porteño	6	2	2	2	8	11	−3	8	2–6		1–0	3–2
3	(Peru) Sporting Cristal	6	2	1	3	6	7	−1	7	0–2	1–1		3–1
4	(Chile) Universidad Católica	6	1	1	4	7	12	−5	4	1–1	2–1	0–1	

Legend: Blue = home team win; Yellow = draw; Red = away team win.

=== Group 3 ===
Pos	Team	Pld	W	D	L	GF	GA	GD	Pts	SAN	AME	NAC	OCT
1	(Brazil) Santos	6	4	2	0	16	4	+12	14		3–0	1–1	3–1
2	(Colombia) América de Cali	6	3	1	2	11	11	0	10	1–5		1–0	4–1
3	(Ecuador) El Nacional	6	1	3	2	4	6	−2	6	0–0	1–1		1–0
4	(Paraguay) 12 de Octubre	6	1	0	5	7	17	−10	3	1–4	1–4	3–1	

Legend: Blue = home team win; Yellow = draw; Red = away team win.

=== Group 4 ===
Pos	Team	Pld	W	D	L	GF	GA	GD	Pts	COB	OLI	GIM	AL
1	(Chile) Cobreloa	6	2	3	1	9	5	+4	9		2–3	0–0	4–0
2	(Paraguay) Olimpia	6	2	3	1	9	6	+3	9	0–0		4–1	0–1
3	(Argentina) Gimnasia y Esgrima	6	1	4	1	8	7	+1	7	0–0	1–1		5–1
4	(Peru) Alianza Lima	6	1	2	3	6	14	−8	5	2–3	1–1	1–1	

Legend: Blue = home team win; Yellow = draw; Red = away team win.

=== Group 5 ===
Pos	Team	Pld	W	D	L	GF	GA	GD	Pts	GRE	UNAM	BOL	PEÑ
1	(Brazil) Grêmio	6	3	1	2	10	7	+3	10		3–2	1–0	4–1
2	(Mexico) Pumas UNAM	6	3	0	3	8	8	0	9	1–0		2–0	3–1
3	(Bolivia) Bolívar	6	3	0	3	8	9	−1	9	1–0	2–0		5–2
4	(Uruguay) Peñarol	6	2	1	3	12	14	−2	7	2–2	2–0	4–0	

Legend: Blue = home team win; Yellow = draw; Red = away team win.

=== Group 6 ===
Pos	Team	Pld	W	D	L	GF	GA	GD	Pts	RAC	NAC	UNI	OP
1	(Argentina) Racing	6	4	2	0	11	4	+7	14		4–1	1–1	2–0
2	(Uruguay) Nacional	6	3	1	2	12	10	+2	10	1–2		2–0	3–0
3	(Peru) Universitario	6	1	4	1	8	8	0	7	1–1	2–2		2–0
4	(Bolivia) Oriente Petrolero	6	0	1	5	4	13	−9	1	0–1	2–3	2–2	

Legend: Blue = home team win; Yellow = draw; Red = away team win.

=== Group 7 ===
Pos	Team	Pld	W	D	L	GF	GA	GD	Pts	IND	BOC	BAR	CCO
1	(Colombia) Independiente Medellín	6	4	0	2	9	6	+3	12		1–0	1–0	2–0
2	(Argentina) Boca Juniors	6	3	2	1	10	7	+3	11	2–0		2–1	2–2
3	(Ecuador) Barcelona	6	1	2	3	8	10	−2	5	2–4	2–2		2–0
4	(Chile) Colo-Colo	6	1	2	3	6	10	−4	5	2–1	1–2	1–1	

Legend: Blue = home team win; Yellow = draw; Red = away team win.

=== Group 8 ===
Pos	Team	Pld	W	D	L	GF	GA	GD	Pts	COR	CRU	FEN	TS
1	(Brazil) Corinthians	6	5	0	1	15	6	+9	15		1–0	6–1	4–1
2	(Mexico) Cruz Azul	6	3	0	3	12	11	+1	9	3–0		4–0	3–2
3	(Uruguay) Fénix	6	2	0	4	10	14	−4	6	1–2	6–1		2–0
4	(Bolivia) The Strongest	6	2	0	4	6	12	−6	6	0–2	2–1	1–0	

Legend: Blue = home team win; Yellow = draw; Red = away team win.

== Bracket ==
Round of 16
(Argentina) River Plate	2	2	4
(Brazil) Corinthians	1	1	2
(Colombia) América	1	0	1
(Argentina) Racing	1	0	1
(Argentina) Boca Juniors	0	4	4
(Brazil) Paysandu	1	2	3
(Mexico) Pumas UNAM	0	0	0
(Chile) Cobreloa	1	0	1
(Paraguay) Olimpia	2	0	2
(Brazil) Grêmio	3	3	6
(Paraguay) Cerro Porteño	0	1	1
(Colombia) I. Medellín	1	0	1
(Mexico) Cruz Azul	0	0	0
(Colombia) Deportivo Cali	0	0	0
(Uruguay) Nacional	4	2	6
(Brazil) Santos	4	2	6

Quarterfinals
(Argentina) River Plate	2	1	3
(Colombia) América	1	4	5
(Argentina) Boca Juniors	2	2	4
(Chile) Cobreloa	1	1	2
(Brazil) Grêmio	2	1	3
(Colombia) I. Medellín	2	2	4
(Mexico) Cruz Azul	2	0	2
(Brazil) Santos	2	1	3

Semifinals
(Colombia) América	0	0	0
(Argentina) Boca Juniors	2	4	6
(Colombia) I. Medellín	0	2	2
(Brazil) Santos	1	3	4

Finals
(Argentina) Boca Juniors	2	3	5
(Brazil) Santos	0	1	1

== Round of 16 ==
Team 1	Agg.	Team 2	1st leg	2nd leg
Olimpia (Paraguay)	2–6	(Brazil) Grêmio	2–3	0–3
Cerro Porteño (Paraguay)	1–1 (2–4 p)	(Colombia) Independiente Medellin	1–0	0–1
Nacional (Uruguay)	6–6 (1–3 p)	(Brazil) Santos	4–4	2–2
Cruz Azul (Mexico)	0–0 (3–2 p)	(Colombia) Deportivo Cali	0–0	0–0
Boca Juniors (Argentina)	4–3	(Brazil) Paysandu	0–1	4–2
Pumas UNAM (Mexico)	0–1	(Chile) Cobreloa	0–0	0–1
River Plate (Argentina)	4–2	(Brazil) Corinthians	2–1	2–1
América (Colombia)	1–1 (6–5 p)	(Argentina) Racing	1–1	0–0

== Quarterfinals ==
Team 1	Agg.	Team 2	1st leg	2nd leg
River Plate (Argentina)	3–5	(Colombia) América	2–1	1–4
Boca Juniors (Argentina)	4–2	(Chile) Cobreloa	2–1	2–1
Gremio (Brazil)	3–4	(Colombia) Medellín	2–2	1–2
Cruz Azul (Mexico)	2–3	(Brazil) Santos	0–1	2–2

== Semi-finals ==
Team 1	Agg.	Team 2	1st leg	2nd leg
Boca Juniors (Argentina)	6–0	(Colombia) América	2–0	4–0
Santos (Brazil)	4–2	(Colombia) Medellín	1–0	3–2

== Finals ==
First Leg
25 June 2003
21:45

Boca Juniors (Argentina)	2–0	Santos (Brazil)
Delgado 32', 83'

Estadio La Bombonera, Buenos Aires
Attendance: 57,000
Referee: Óscar Ruiz (Colombia)
Second Leg
2 July 2003
21:45

Santos (Brazil)	1–3	Boca Juniors (Argentina)
Alex 75'		Tevez 21'; Delgado 84'; Schiavi 90+5'

Estádio do Morumbi, São Paulo
Attendance: 75,000
Referee: Jorge Larrionda (Uruguay)

Copa Libertadores de América
2003 champion

Fifth title
