= 2001–02 Club Atlético Boca Juniors season =

Boca Juniors football season

Boca Juniors
2001-02 season
- President: Mauricio Macri
- Manager: Carlos Bianchi (until 20 December 2001); Oscar Tabarez
- Stadium: La Bombonera
- Primera Division: Apertura:3rd; Clausura:3rd
- Copa Mercosur: Group Stage
- Copa Libertadores: Quarterfinals
- Intercontinental Cup: Runners-up
- FIFA Club World Championship: Cancelled
- Top goalscorer: League: Apertura:Riquelme (7); Clausura:Bracamonte (7); All: Riquelme (10); Schelotto (10)
Home colours	Away colours	Third colours

The 2001–02 Club Atlético Boca Juniors season was the 72nd consecutive Primera División season played by the senior squad.

== Summary ==
During summer several players left the club included right back defender Hugo Ibarra, Colombian full back Jorge Bermudez and midfielder Anibal Matellan. Also, Colombian Goalkeeper Oscar Cordoba almost was signed by Tottenham Hotspur prompting Mauricio Macri to block the transfer, however, Cordoba got the transfer out during January towards Serie A team Perugia .

Macri reinforced the squad with central defender Rolando Schiavi from Argentinos Juniors, right back defender Jorge Daniel Martinez, Brazilian defender Jorginho Paulista on loan from Udinese Calcio and purely for Japanese football supporters Naohiro Takahara. With the exception of Schiavi the arrivals were a total failure and most of them were transferred out during December.

In the Apertura Tournament the team finished on 3rd spot, eleven points below of Champions Racing. Meanwhile, in 2001 Intercontinental Cup the squad was defeated by German side Bayern München after extra time.

Head coach Carlos Bianchi started negotiations for a renewal after two years of contract (the last renovation was in December 1999) and after several rumors Bianchi chose to not accept the Board conditions. Then, Macri appointed during December Uruguayan coach Oscar Tabarez former manager of Boca Juniors during 1992 Apertura Tournament which the team won and ended eleven years of League drought.

Owing to government economic measures known as Corralito in the Clausura Tournament, Macri reinforced the team with a few players included forward Héctor Bracamonte, defender Diego Crosa and Jonathan Fabbro the squad finished on 3rd spot again, eight points below of Champions River Plate.

Meanwhile, in 2002 Copa Libertadores the squad reached the quarterfinals stage and was eliminated by future Champions Paraguayan side Olimpia after a 0–1 defeat in the second leg of the series.

The season is best remembered by League debut of future club legend forward 16-yr-old Carlos Tevez against Talleres de Cordoba on 21 October 2000 .

== Squad ==
Note: Flags indicate national team as defined under FIFA eligibility rules; some limited exceptions apply. Players may hold more than one non-FIFA nationality.

No.	Pos.	Nation	Player
—	GK	ARG	Roberto Abbondanzieri
—	GK	COL	Oscar Cordoba
—	GK	ARG	Willy Caballero
—	GK	ARG	Christian Muñoz
—	DF	ARG	Nicolas Burdisso
—	DF	ARG	Clemente Rodriguez
—	DF	ARG	Omar Sebastián Pérez
—	DF	ARG	Gustavo Pinto
—	DF	ARG	Javier Alejandro Villarreal
—	DF	ARG	José María Calvo
—	DF	ARG	Rolando Schiavi
—	DF	BRA	Jorginho Paulista
—	DF	ARG	Nahuel Fioretto
—	DF	ARG	Cesar Alberto Gonzalez
—	DF	ARG	Juan Forchetti
—	DF	ARG	Jonathan Fabbro

No.	Pos.	Nation	Player
—	MF	COL	Mauricio Serna
—	MF	ARG	Christian Traverso
—	MF	ARG	Juan Roman Riquelme
—	MF	ARG	Sebastian Battaglia
—	MF	ARG	Julio Marchant
—	MF	ARG	Joel Enrique Barbosa
—	MF	ARG	Roberto Colautti
—	MF	ARG	Ariel Carreño
—	MF	ARG	Jorge Daniel Martinez
—	MF	ARG	Diego Crosa
—	FW	ARG	Guillermo Barros Schelotto
—	FW	ARG	Marcelo Delgado
—	FW	ARG	Antonio Barijho
—	FW	ARG	Christian Giménez
—	FW	ARG	Walter Gaitán
—	FW	JPN	Naohiro Takahara
—	FW	ARG	Alfredo Moreno
—	FW	ARG	Carlos Tevez
—	FW	ARG	Héctor Bracamonte
—	FW	ARG	Abel Balbo

=== Transfers ===
In
Pos.	Name	From	Type
DF	Rolando Schiavi	Argentinos Juniors	
MF	Jorge Daniel Martinez		
DF	Jorginho Paulista	Udinese Calcio	loan
DF	Juan Forchetti		
FW	Naohiro Takahara	Júbilo Iwata	
DF	Nahuel Fioretto		
GK	Willy Caballero		
DF	Cesar Alberto Gonzalez		
FW	Carlos Tevez		

Out
Pos.	Name	To	Type
DF	Hugo Ibarra	FC Porto	
DF	Jorge Bermudez	Olympiacos	
MF	Anibal Matellan	Schalke 04	
MF	Fernando Pandolfi	Velez Sarsfield	
DF	Emanuel Ruiz		
DF	Facundo Imboden		
DF	Esteban José Herrera		loan
DF	Cesar Osvaldo La Paglia		
DF	Elías Bazzi		

==== January ====
In
Pos.	Name	From	Type
FW	Héctor Bracamonte	CD Badajoz	
DF	Diego Crosa	Real Betis	
DF	Jonathan Fabbro	RCD Mallorca B	
MF	Abel Balbo	AS Roma	

Out
Pos.	Name	To	Type
GK	Oscar Cordoba	AC Perugia	
MF	Roberto Colautti		
MF	Nahuel Fioretto		
FW	Naohiro Takahara		
MF	Antonio Barijho		
DF	Jorginho Paulista		

== Competitions ==
=== Torneo Apertura ===
==== League table ====
Pos	Team	Pld	W	D	L	GF	GA	GD	Pts
1	Racing	19	12	6	1	34	17	+17	42
2	River Plate	19	12	5	2	51	16	+35	41
3	Boca Juniors	19	9	6	4	41	27	+14	33
4	Colón	19	8	8	3	24	16	+8	32
5	San Lorenzo	19	8	7	4	28	22	+6	31

==== Position by round ====
Round	1	2	3	4	5	6	7	8	9	10	11	12	13	14	15	16	17	18	19
Ground	H	A	H	A	H	A	H	A	H	A	H	H	A	H	A	H	A	H	A
Result	L	L	D	D	W	D	W	W	W	L	W	W	D	W	W	L	D	W	D
Position	16	17	15	14	13	13	12	10	9	10	5	3	3	3	3	3	3	3	3

Source: www.afa.com.ar
A = Away; H = Home; W = Win; D = Draw; L = Loss

==== Matches ====
19 August 2001 1	Boca Juniors	1-3	Belgrano (C)	La Boca
		Report		Stadium: La Bombonera

26 August 2001 2	San Lorenzo	1-0	Boca Juniors	Almagro
				Stadium: Nuevo Gasometro

29 August 2001 3	Boca Juniors	0-0	Colon	La Boca
				Stadium: La Bombonera

2 September 2001 4	Gimnasia (LP)	2-2	Boca Juniors	La Plata
				Stadium: El Bosque

9 September 2001 5	Boca Juniors	3-1	Chacarita Juniors	La Boca
				Stadium: La Bombonera

16 September 2001 6	River Plate	1-1	Boca Juniors	Nuñez
				Stadium: Monumental

23 September 2001 7	Boca Juniors	6-1	Lanus	La Boca
				Stadium: La Bombonera

30 September 2001 8	Argentinos Juniors	1-3	Boca Juniors	Caballito
				Stadium: Ricardo Etcheverri

3 October 2001 9	Boca Juniors	3-1	Rosario Central	La Boca
				Stadium: La Bombonera

21 October 2001 10	Talleres	1-0	Boca Juniors	Cordoba
				Stadium: Olimpico

28 October 2001 11	Boca Juniors	2-1	Huracan	La Boca
				Stadium: La Bombonera

1 November 2001 15	Boca Juniors	3-1	Racing	La Boca
				Stadium: La Bombonera

4 November 2001 12	Union (SF)	2-2	Boca Juniors	Santa Fe
				Stadium: 15 de Abril

11 November 2001 13	Boca Juniors	4-2	Estudiantes LP	La Boca
				Stadium: La Bombonera

18 November 2001 14	Nueva Chicago	1-2	Boca Juniors	Liniers
				Stadium: Jose Amalfitani

2 December 2001 16	Boca Juniors	0-1	Banfield	La Boca
				Stadium: La Bombonera

9 December 2001 17	Velez Sarsfield	2-2	Boca Juniors	Liniers
				Stadium: Jose Amalfitani

16 December 2001 18	Boca Juniors	5-3	Independiente	La Boca
				Stadium: La Bombonera

5 February 2002 19	Newell's Old Boys	2-2	Boca Juniors	Rosario
				Stadium: Marcelo Bielsa

=== Torneo Clausura ===
==== League table ====
Pos	Team	Pld	W	D	L	GF	GA	GD	Pts
1	River Plate	19	13	4	2	39	13	+26	43
2	Gimnasia y Esgrima (LP)	19	11	4	4	33	23	+10	37
3	Boca Juniors	19	10	5	4	25	17	+8	35
4	Huracán	19	9	3	7	27	14	+13	30
5	Banfield	19	8	6	5	21	19	+2	30

==== Position by round ====
Round	1	2	3	4	5	6	7	8	9	10	11	12	13	14	15	16	17	18	19
Ground	A	H	A	H	A	H	A	H	A	H	A	H	A	H	A	A	H	A	H
Result	W	D	W	D	D	L	L	W	W	W	W	W	W	D	L	L	W	D	W
Position	7	4	3	2	3	7	10	5	4	3	3	2	2	2	3	3	3	3	3

Source: www.afa.com.ar
A = Away; H = Home; W = Win; D = Draw; L = Loss

==== Matches ====
10 February 2002 1	Belgrano (C)	2-3	Boca Juniors	Cordoba
		Report		Stadium: Olimpico

17 February 2002 2	Boca Juniors	0-0	San Lorenzo	La Boca
				Stadium: La Bombonera

20 February 2002 3	Colon	1-3	Boca Juniors	Santa Fe
				Stadium: Cementerio de los Elefantes

24 February 2002 4	Boca Juniors	1-1	Gimnasia (LP)	La Boca
				Stadium: La Bombonera

3 March 2002 5	Chacarita Juniors	1-1	Boca Juniors	Almagro
				Stadium: Nuevo Gasometro

10 March 2002 6	Boca Juniors	0-3	River Plate	La Boca
				Stadium: La Bombonera

17 March 2002 7	Lanus	1-0	Boca Juniors	Lanus
				Stadium: Estadio Ciudad de Lanús

24 March 2002 8	Boca Juniors	3-2	Argentinos Juniors	La Boca
				Stadium: La Bombonera

27 March 2002 9	Rosario Central	1-3	Boca Juniors	Rosario
				Stadium: Gigante de Arroyito

31 March 2002 10	Boca Juniors	1-0	Talleres	La Boca
				Stadium: La Bombonera

3 April 2002 11	Huracan	0-2	Boca Juniors	Parque Patricios
				Stadium: El Palacio

7 April 2002 12	Boca Juniors	3-0	Union (SF)	La Boca
				Stadium: La Bombonera

14 April 2002 13	Estudiantes LP	0-1	Boca Juniors	La Plata
				Stadium: Jorge Luis Hirschi

17 April 2002 14	Boca Juniors	0-0	Nueva Chicago	La Boca
				Stadium: La Bombonera

21 April 2002 15	Racing	2-0	Boca Juniors	Avellaneda
				Stadium: Presidente Peron

28 April 2002 16	Banfield	1-0	Boca Juniors	Banfield
				Stadium: Florencio Sola

5 May 2002 17	Boca Juniors	2-1	Velez Sarsfield	La Boca
				Stadium: La Bombonera

12 May 2002 18	Independiente	1-1	Boca Juniors	Avellaneda
				Stadium: La Doble Visera

19 May 2002 19	Boca Juniors	1-0	Newell's Old Boys	La Boca
				Stadium: La Bombonera

=== Copa Mercosur ===
Pos	Team	Pld	W	D	L	GF	GA	GD	Pts	Qualification	(Paraguay) CER	(Chile) UCA	(Brazil) VAS	(Argentina) BOC
1	(Paraguay) Cerro Porteño	6	3	1	2	8	6	+2	10	Advance to Quarter-finals	—	2–0	2–1	2–1
2	(Chile) Universidad Católica	6	3	0	3	8	9	−1	9	Advance to Quarter-finals	1–0	—	2–1	2–1
3	(Brazil) Vasco da Gama	6	2	2	2	11	11	0	8		3–2	2–1	—	2–2
4	(Argentina) Boca Juniors	6	1	3	2	9	10	−1	6		0–0	3–2	2–2	—

Source: CONMEBOL

Pos	Grp	Team	Pld	W	D	L	GF	GA	GD	Pts	Qualification
1	B	(Argentina) San Lorenzo	6	3	1	2	9	4	+5	10	Advance to Quarterfinals
2	C	(Argentina) Independiente	6	3	0	3	8	8	0	9	Advance to Quarterfinals
3	A	(Chile) Universidad Católica	6	3	0	3	8	9	−1	9	Advance to Quarterfinals
4	E	(Argentina) River Plate	6	2	2	2	13	10	+3	8	
5	D	(Argentina) Vélez Sársfield	6	2	2	2	12	11	+1	8	

Source: RSSSF

29 July 2001 1	Vasco da Gama (Brazil)	2–2	(Argentina) Boca Juniors	Brasília
	Pedrinho 26'; Patrício 73'	Report	Pérez 42', 60'	Stadium: Nacional

1 August 2001 2	Boca Juniors (Argentina)	0–0	(Paraguay) Cerro Porteño	Buenos Aires
		Report		Stadium: La Bombonera

12 September 2001 3	Cerro Porteño (Paraguay)	2–1	(Argentina) Boca Juniors	Asunción
	Alvarenga 40'; Ferreira 90'	Report	Schiavi 5'	Stadium: Defensores del Chaco

19 September 2001 4	Universidad Católica (Chile)	2–1	(Argentina) Boca Juniors	Santiago
	Lenci 70'; Arrué 72'	Report	Barijho 13'	Stadium: San Carlos de Apoquindo

25 September 2001 5	Boca Juniors (Argentina)	2–2	(Brazil) Vasco da Gama	Buenos Aires
	Barbosa 79'; Carreño 80'	Report	Odvan 63'; Euller 83'	Stadium: La Bombonera

18 October 2001 6	Boca Juniors (Argentina)	3–2	(Chile) Universidad Católica	Buenos Aires
	Colautti 28'; Carreño 58'; Giménez 83'	Report	Valdebenito 57'; Norambuena 68'	Stadium: La Bombonera

=== Copa Libertadores ===
==== Group stage ====
Pos	Team	Pld	W	D	L	GF	GA	GD	Pts	BOC	MON	SAN	EME
1	(Argentina) Boca Juniors	6	4	1	1	7	2	+5	13		2–0	0–0	1–0
2	(Uruguay) Montevideo Wanderers	6	3	1	2	8	7	+1	10	0–2		3–1	3–1
3	(Chile) Santiago Wanderers	6	2	3	1	6	6	0	9	1–0	1–1		2–1
4	(Ecuador) Emelec	6	0	1	5	4	10	−6	1	1–2	0–1	1–1	

Legend: Blue = home team win; Yellow = draw; Red = away team win.

13 February 2002 1	Boca Juniors (Argentina)	0–0	(Chile) Santiago Wanderers	Buenos Aires
		Report		Stadium: La Bombonera

27 February 2002 2	Emelec (Ecuador)	1–2	(Argentina) Boca Juniors	Guayaquil
	Moreira 48'	Report	Barros Schelotto 81' (pen.); Bracamonte 89'	Stadium: George Capwell

6 March 2002 3	Boca Juniors (Argentina)	2–0	(Uruguay) Montevideo Wanderers	Buenos Aires
	Burdisso 13'; Traverso 70'	Report		Stadium: La Bombonera

14 March 2002 4	Santiago Wanderers (Chile)	1–0	(Argentina) Boca Juniors	Viña del Mar
	Fernández 47'	Report		Stadium: Sausalito

20 March 2002 5	Boca Juniors (Argentina)	1–0	(Ecuador) Emelec	Buenos Aires
	Barros Schelotto 24'	Report		Stadium: La Bombonera

10 April 2002 6	Montevideo Wanderers (Uruguay)	0–2	(Argentina) Boca Juniors	Montevideo
		Report	Gaitán 69'; Giménez 81'	Stadium: Centenario

==== Eighthfinals ====
25 April 2002 1st Leg	El Nacional (Ecuador)	0–0	(Argentina) Boca Juniors	Quito
		Report		Stadium: Atahualpa; Referee: (Colombia) Óscar Ruiz

1 May 2002 2nd Leg	Boca Juniors (Argentina)	2–0 (2–0 agg.)	(Ecuador) El Nacional	Buenos Aires
	Calvo 27'; Delgado 36'	Report		Stadium: Estadio La Bombonera; Referee: (Chile) Carlos Chandía

==== Quarterfinals ====
8 May 2002 1st Leg	Boca Juniors (Argentina)	1–1	(Paraguay) Olimpia	Buenos Aires
	Tevez 18'	Report	Traverso 67' (own goal)	Stadium: Estadio La Bombonera; Referee: (Peru) Gilberto Hidalgo

16 May 2002 2nd Leg	Olimpia (Paraguay)	1–0 (2–1 agg.)	(Argentina) Boca Juniors	Asunción
	Isasi 67'	Report		Stadium: Estadio Defensores del Chaco; Referee: (Brazil) Antônio Pereira da Silva

=== Intercontinental Cup ===
27 November 2001	Bayern München (Germany)	1–0 (a.e.t.)	Boca Juniors	Tokyo
19:20 JST	Kuffour 109'	Report		Stadium: National Stadium; Attendance: 51,360; Referee: (Denmark) Kim Milton Nielsen

=== FIFA Club World Championship ===
As winners of the 2000 Copa Libertadores, Boca Juniors was one of the 12 teams that were invited to the 2001 FIFA Club World Championship, which would be hosted in Spain from 28 July to 12 August 2001. However, the tournament was cancelled, primarily due to the collapse of ISL, which was a marketing partner of FIFA at the time.

28 July 2001 1	Boca Juniors (Argentina)	Cancelled	(Spain) Deportivo de La Coruña	A Coruña
20:00 (CEST)				Stadium: Riazor

1 August 2001 2	Zamalek SC (Egypt)	Cancelled	(Argentina) Boca Juniors	A Coruña
22:00 (CEST)				Stadium: Riazor

4 August 2001 3	Boca Juniors (Argentina)	Cancelled	(Australia) Wollongong Wolves FC	Santiago de Compostela
20:30 (CEST)				Stadium: Multiusos de San Lázaro

== Statistics ==
=== Players statistics ===
No.	Pos	Nat	Player	Total		Apertura 2001		Clausura 2002		Libertadores		Mercosur 2001	
No.	Pos	Nat	Player	Apps	Goals	Apps	Goals	Apps	Goals	Apps	Goals	Apps	Goals
	GK	(Argentina) ARG	Abbondanzieri	37	0	5	0	17	0	10	0	5	0
	DF	(Argentina) ARG	Calvo	29	2	6	1	10	0	10	1	3	0
	DF	(Argentina) ARG	Burdisso	37	2	16	1	10	0	7	1	4	0
	DF	(Argentina) ARG	Schiavi	37	4	18	1	11	2	6	0	2	1
	DF	(Argentina) ARG	Clemente Rodriguez	35	0	12	0	14	0	6	0	3	0
	MF	(Argentina) ARG	Christian Traverso	40	1	17	0	11	0	9	1	3	0
	MF	(Colombia) COL	Mauricio Serna	28	0	12	0	7	0	5	0	4	0
	MF	(Argentina) ARG	Sebastian Battaglia	29	3	3	0	15	3	9	0	2	0
	MF	(Argentina) ARG	Juan Roman Riquelme	27	10	13	7	9	3	4	0	1	0
	FW	(Argentina) ARG	Guillermo Barros Schelotto	32	10	14	6	8	2	6	2	4	0
	FW	(Argentina) ARG	Marcelo Delgado	36	8	14	5	11	2	8	1	3	0
	DF	(Argentina) ARG	Julio Marchant	13	0	5	0	4	0	1	0	3	0
	FW	(Argentina) ARG	Christian Giménez	32	5	6	1	16	2	7	1	3	1
	DF	(Argentina) ARG	Omar Sebastián Pérez	30	2	8	0	10	0	7	0	5	2
	DF	(Argentina) ARG	Gustavo Pinto	28	0	12	0	10	0	3	0	3	0
	FW	(Argentina) ARG	Walter Gaitán	31	9	12	8	10	0	6	1	3	0
	DF	(Argentina) ARG	Jorge Daniel Martinez	26	2	11	2	8	0	4	0	3	0
	MF	(Argentina) ARG	Ariel Carreño	24	7	9	3	6	2	5	0	4	2
	DF	(Argentina) ARG	Cesar Alberto Gonzalez	9	1	1	0	7	1	1	0		
	FW	(Argentina) ARG	Carlos Tevez	15	2	1	0	10	1	4	1		
	MF	(Argentina) ARG	Diego Crosa	12	1	0	0	8	1	4	0		
	FW	(Argentina) ARG	Abel Balbo	4	0	0	0	0	0	4	0		
	FW	(Argentina) ARG	Héctor Bracamonte	18	8	0	0	13	7	5	1		
	DF	(Argentina) ARG	Javier Alejandro Villarreal	10	0	6	0	3	0	0	0	1	0
	MF	(Argentina) ARG	Joel Enrique Barbosa	13	1	7	0	2	0	0	0	4	1
	GK	(Argentina) ARG	Willy Caballero	4	0	1	0	3	0				
	FW	(Argentina) ARG	Alfredo Moreno	2	0	1	0	1	0				
	DF	(Argentina) ARG	Juan Forchetti	8	0	7	0	1	0				
	DF	(Argentina) ARG	Jonathan Fabbro	2	0	0	0	2	0				
	GK	(Colombia) COL	Oscar Cordoba	15	0	14	0	0	0	0	0	1	0
	FW	(Argentina) ARG	Antonio Barijho	8	3	6	2	0	0	0	0	2	1
	MF	(Argentina) ARG	Roberto Colautti	5	2	3	1	0	0	0	0	2	1
	DF	(Brazil) BRA	Jorginho Paulista	15	0	11	0	0	0	0	0	4	0
	FW	(Japan) JPN	Naohiro Takahara	7	1	6	1	0	0	0	0	1	0
	DF	(Argentina) ARG	Nahuel Fioretto	7	0	4	0	0	0	0	0	3	0
	MF	(Argentina) ARG	José Antonio Pereda	3	0	0	0	0	0	0	0	3	0
	DF	(Argentina) ARG	Miguel Alejandro Portillo	2	0	0	0	0	0	0	0	2	0
