= 1999–2000 Club Atlético Boca Juniors season =

Boca Juniors football season

Boca Juniors
1999–2000 season
- President: Mauricio Macri
- Manager: Carlos Bianchi
- Stadium: La Bombonera
- Apertura Tournament: 3rd.
- Clausura Tournament: 7th.
- Copa Mercosur: Group stage
- Copa Libertadores: Champion
- Top goalscorer: League: All: Martin Palermo (20)
Home colours	Away colours

The 1999–2000 Club Atlético Boca Juniors season was the 70th consecutive Primera División season played by the senior squad.

== Summary ==
Alternate kit worn in Copa Mercosur only

The club' s main goal for Apertura was clinching its three consecutive League title for the first time in its history. The squad was reinforced with few players included forward Alfredo Moreno. The race for the title started early against archrivals River Plate during the whole season. Finally, the club finished in 3rd place, just below Millonarios, thanks to key injured players and a 0–2 defeat against River.

In the Clausura Tournament, the club was reinforced with several players including forward Marcelo Delgado from Racing. The team finished in 7th place. A key event of the season came in the game against Newell's Old Boys. Because fireworks were thrown on the field, the game was suspended, and a judicial sanction deducted 3 points in the standings. In the replay, Newell's won the match and Boca Juniors finished below Champions River Plate.

Meanwhile, the club returned to play in the Copa Libertadores for the first time in six years. They advanced to the quarterfinals, defeating archrivals River Plate. In the semifinals the squad eliminated Mexican team America thanks to a Samuel goal in the final minutes of the second leg. In the Finals of the tournament the squad defeated incumbent Champions Palmeiras after a penalty shoot-out, clinching the cup for the first time in 22 years.

== Squad ==
Note: Flags indicate national team as defined under FIFA eligibility rules; some limited exceptions apply. Players may hold more than one non-FIFA nationality.

No.	Pos.	Nation	Player
1	GK	COL	Oscar Cordoba
2	DF	COL	Jorge Bermúdez
3	DF	ARG	Rodolfo Arruabarrena
4	DF	ARG	Hugo Ibarra
5	MF	COL	Mauricio Serna
6	DF	ARG	Walter Samuel
7	FW	ARG	Guillermo Barros Schelotto
8	MF	ARG	Diego Cagna
9	FW	ARG	Martín Palermo
10	MF	ARG	Juan Roman Riquelme
11	MF	ARG	Fernando Navas
12	GK	ARG	Roberto Abbondanzieri
13	MF	ARG	Christian Traverso
14	MF	ARG	Nicolás Burdisso
16	FW	ARG	Marcelo Delgado
17	MF	ARG	Gustavo Barros Schelotto

No.	Pos.	Nation	Player
18	MF	ARG	José Basualdo
19	DF	ARG	César La Paglia
20	FW	ARG	Antonio Barijho
21	FW	ARG	Christian Giménez
22	MF	ARG	Sebastián Battaglia
23	FW	ARG	Alfredo Moreno
24	MF	ARG	José Antonio Pereda
26	FW	ARG	Emanuel Ruiz
—	DF	ARG	Aníbal Matellán
—	DF	ARG	José María Calvo
—	MF	ARG	Omar Pérez
—	DF	ARG	Gustavo Pinto
—	DF	ARG	Julio Marchant
—	FW	ARG	Matías Arce
—	MF	ARG	Facundo Imboden
—	DF	ARG	Elías Bazzi

=== Transfers ===
In
Pos.	Name	From	Type
FW	Alfredo Moreno		
DF	Emanuel Ruiz		loan ended

Out
Pos.	Name	To	Type
FW	Claudio Caniggia		

==== January ====
In
Pos.	Name	From	Type
FW	Marcelo Delgado	Racing	
MF	Julio Javier Marchant		
MF	Matías Sebastián Arce		
DF	José María Calvo		
DF	Omar Sebastián Pérez		
MF	Gustavo Hernán Pinto		
MF	Facundo Jorge Imboden		
DF	Elías Iván Bazzi		

Out
Pos.	Name	To	Type
MF	Diego Cagna	Villarreal CF	loan
FW	Claudio Caniggia	Atalanta BC	released

== Competitions ==
=== Torneo Apertura ===
==== League table ====
Pos	Team	Pld	W	D	L	GF	GA	GD	Pts
1	River Plate	19	13	5	1	42	21	+21	44
2	Rosario Central	19	14	1	4	34	18	+16	43
3	Boca Juniors	19	12	5	2	36	15	+21	41
4	San Lorenzo	19	10	6	3	30	15	+15	33 (Note: 3 points deducted)
5	Talleres (C)	19	9	4	6	38	31	+7	31

==== Position by round ====
Round	1	2	3	4	5	6	7	8	9	10	11	12	13	14	15	16	17	18	19
Ground	H	A	H	A	H	A	A	H	A	H	A	H	A	H	A	H	A	H	A
Result	W	D	W	W	W	L	D	L	L	W	W	W	L	W	W	W	L	L	D
Position	2	3	2	2	3	2	3	4	2	1	4	2	2	2	2	2	2	2	3

Source: www.afa.com.ar
A = Away; H = Home; W = Win; D = Draw; L = Loss

==== Matches ====
8 August 1999 1	Boca Juniors	3–0	Independiente	Buenos Aires
	Palermo 16', 46'; Cagna 41'	Report		Stadium: La Bombonera; Referee: Claudio Martín

18 August 1999 2	Boca Juniors	1–1	Racing	Buenos Aires
	Palermo 26'	Report	Peralta 31'	Stadium: La Bombonera; Referee: Angel Sánchez

22 August 1999 3	Lanus	1–4	Boca Juniors	Lanús
	J. Fernández 28'	Report	Palermo 46', 48', 68'; Guillermo B.S.	Stadium: Lanús Stadium; Referee: Gabriel Brazenas

29 August 1999 4	Boca Juniors	2–0	Chacarita Juniors	Buenos Aires
	Guillermo B.S. 28', 30'	Report		Stadium: La Bombonera; Referee: Héctor Baldassi

3 September 1999 5	Argentinos Juniors	1–1	Boca Juniors	Buenos Aires
	Plaza 58'		Palermo 45'	Stadium: Ferro C. Oeste; Referee: Horacio Elizondo

12 September 1999 6	Boca Juniors	2–0	Ferro Carril Oeste	Buenos Aires
	Cagna 55'; Palermo 70'	Report		Stadium: La Bombonera; Referee: Claudio Martín

19 September 1999 7	Vélez Sarsfield	3–1	Boca Juniors	Buenos Aires
	Bardaro 1', 15'; F. Domínguez 85'	Report	Bermúdez 24'	Stadium: José Amalfitani; Referee: Gabriel Brazenas

26 September 1999 8	Boca Juniors	0–0	San Lorenzo	Buenos Aires
		Report		Stadium: La Bombonera; Referee: Angel Sánchez

2 October 1999 9	Gimnasia y Esgrima (J)	1–3	Boca Juniors	Jujuy
	Juárez 12'	Report	Guillermo B.S. 31'; Palermo 40', 50'	Stadium: 23 de Agosto; Referee: Sergio Pezzotta

10 October 1999 10	Boca Juniors	2-0	Instituto de Cordoba	Buenos Aires
				Stadium: La Bombonera

17 October 1999 11	River Plate	2-0	Boca Juniors	Nuñez
				Stadium: Monumental

30 October 1999 12	Rosario Central	1-3	Boca Juniors

7 November 1999 13	Boca Juniors	2-1	Newell's Old Boys	Buenos Aires
				Stadium: La Bombonera

13 November 1999 14	Colon	1-2	Boca Juniors

21 November 1999 15	Boca Juniors	2-0	Union (Santa Fe)	Buenos Aires
				Stadium: La Bombonera

26 November 1999 16	Estudiantes La Plata	2-2	Boca Juniors

5 December 1999 17	Boca Juniors	1-0	Gimnasia (LP)	Buenos Aires
				Stadium: La Bombonera

12 December 1999 18	Belgrano (Cba)	1-5	Boca Juniors

19 December 1999 19	Boca Juniors	0-0	Talleres (Cba)	Buenos Aires
				Stadium: La Bombonera

=== Torneo Clausura ===
==== League table ====
Pos	Team	Pld	W	D	L	GF	GA	GD	Pts
5	Newell's Old Boys	19	10	4	5	32	21	+11	34
6	Vélez Sársfield	19	9	7	3	28	18	+10	34
7	Boca Juniors	19	10	6	3	38	17	+21	33
8	Unión	19	9	2	8	28	40	−12	29
9	Gimnasia y Esgrima (LP)	19	8	4	7	28	33	−5	28

==== Position by round ====
Round	1	2	3	4	5	6	7	8	9	10	11	12	13	14	15	16	17	18	19
Ground	H	A	H	A	H	A	A	H	A	H	A	H	A	H	A	H	A	H	A
Result	W	D	W	W	W	L	D	L	L	W	W	W	L	W	W	W	L	L	D
Position	2	4	8	3	2	1	2	1	1	4	3	2	4	3	4	4	2	2	7

Source: www.afa.com.ar
A = Away; H = Home; W = Win; D = Draw; L = Loss

==== Matches ====
13 February 2000 1	Independiente	1-3	Boca Juniors	Avellaneda
				Stadium: La Doble Visera

20 February 2000 2	Racing	1-1	Boca Juniors	Avellaneda
				Stadium: Cilindro de Avellaneda

27 February 2000 3	Boca Juniors	1-1	Lanus	Buenos Aires
				Stadium: La Bombonera

5 March 2000 4	Chacarita Juniors	0-4	Boca Juniors	Chacarita
				Stadium: Estadio de Chacarita Juniors

12 March 2000 5	Boca Juniors	1-0	Argentinos Juniors	Buenos Aires
				Stadium: La Bombonera

19 March 2000 6	Ferro Carril Oeste	0-4	Boca Juniors	Caballito
				Stadium: El Templo

2 April 2000 7	Boca Juniors	0-0	Velez Sarsfield	Buenos Aires
				Stadium: La Bombonera

9 April 2000 8	San Lorenzo	0-1	Boca Juniors

16 April 2000 10	Instituto (C)	2-2	Boca Juniors

22 April 2000 9	Boca Juniors	0-1	Gimnasia y Esgrima (J)	Buenos Aires
				Stadium: La Bombonera

14 May 2000 11	Boca Juniors	1-1	Club Atlético River Plate	Buenos Aires
				Stadium: La Bombonera

21 May 2000 12	Boca Juniors	2-0	Rosario Central	Buenos Aires
				Stadium: La Bombonera

3 June 2000 13	Newell's Old Boys	1-0	Boca Juniors
	Manso 53'		Matellan (red card) 32'	Referee: Madorran

11 June 2000 14	Boca Juniors	3-2	Colon	Buenos Aires
				Stadium: La Bombonera

28 June 2000 15	Union (Santa Fe)	2-5	Boca Juniors

2 July 2000 17	Gimnasia (LP)	2-1	Boca Juniors

5 July 2000 16	Boca Juniors	2-0	Estudiantes La Plata	Buenos Aires
				Stadium: La Bombonera

9 July 2000 18	Boca Juniors	5-1	Belgrano (Cba)	Buenos Aires
				Stadium: La Bombonera

15 July 2000 19	Talleres (Cba)	2-2	Boca Juniors

=== Copa Mercosur ===
Team	Pts	Pld	W	D	L	GF	GA	GD
(Argentina) San Lorenzo	12	6	4	0	2	8	5	+3
(Argentina) Boca Juniors	10	6	3	1	2	10	5	+5
(Brazil) São Paulo	10	6	3	1	2	11	8	+3
(Chile) Universidad Católica	3	6	1	0	5	2	13	-11

31 July 1999 1	Boca Juniors (Argentina)	5–1	(Brazil) São Paulo	Buenos Aires
	Gui. Barros Schelotto 4', 14', 31'; Ibarra 22'; Barijho 90'	Report	Rai 29'	Stadium: La Bombonera

4 August 1999 2	San Lorenzo (Argentina)	1–0	(Argentina) Boca Juniors	Buenos Aires
	López 15'	Report		Stadium: Nuevo Gasómetro

26 August 1999 3	Boca Juniors (Argentina)	1–0	(Chile) Universidad Católica	Buenos Aires
	Palermo 81'	Report		Stadium: La Bombonera

8 September 1999 4	São Paulo (Brazil)	1–1	(Argentina) Boca Juniors	São Paulo
	Márcio 38'	Report	Cagna 24'	Stadium: Morumbi

22 September 1999 5	Boca Juniors (Argentina)	0–1	(Argentina) San Lorenzo	Buenos Aires
		Report	Morel 30'	Stadium: La Bombonera

7 October 1999 6	Universidad Católica (Chile)	1–3	(Argentina) Boca Juniors	Santiago
	Figueroa 78' (pen.)	Report	Palermo 2'; Gui. Barros Schelotto 62' (pen.), 82'	Stadium: San Carlos de Apoquindo

=== Copa Libertadores ===
==== Group stage ====
Pos	Team	Pld	W	D	L	GF	GA	GD	Pts	Qualification
1	(Argentina) Boca Juniors	6	4	1	1	14	5	+9	13	Round of 16
2	(Uruguay) Peñarol	6	2	3	1	12	9	+3	9	Round of 16
3	(Bolivia) Blooming	6	2	1	3	9	17	−8	7	
4	(Chile) Universidad Católica	6	1	1	4	10	14	−4	4	

23 February 2000 1	Blooming (Bolivia)	1–0	(Argentina) Boca Juniors	Santa Cruz
	Antelo 45'	Report		Stadium: Estadio Ramón Tahuichi Aguilera

2 March 2000 2	Boca Juniors (Argentina)	2–1	(Chile) Universidad Católica	Buenos Aires
	Barijho 6'; G. Barros Schelotto 57' (pen.)	Report	Núñez 75'	Stadium: La Bombonera

16 March 2000 3	Peñarol (Uruguay)	0–0	(Argentina) Boca Juniors	Montevideo
		Report		Stadium: Estadio Centenario

22 March 2000 4	Boca Juniors (Argentina)	6–1	(Bolivia) Blooming	Buenos Aires
	Moreno 3', 46', 58', 63', 65'; Traverso 9'	Report	Gutiérrez 73'	Stadium: La Bombonera

12 April 2000 5	Universidad Católica (Chile)	1–3	(Argentina) Boca Juniors	Santiago
	Núñez 20'	Report	Barijho 34', 84'; Bermúdez 70'	Stadium: Estadio San Carlos de Apoquindo

19 April 2000 6	Boca Juniors (Argentina)	3–1	(Uruguay) Peñarol	Buenos Aires
	Arruabarrena 52'; Marchant 61'; Barijho 85'	Report	Pacheco 38'	Stadium: La Bombonera

==== Eighthfinals ====
3 May 2000	El Nacional (Ecuador)	0–0	(Argentina) Boca Juniors	Quito
1900				Stadium: Estadio Olímpico Atahualpa; Referee: (Colombia) Óscar Ruiz

9 May 2000	Boca Juniors (Argentina)	5–3 (5:1)	(Ecuador) El Nacional	Buenos Aires
1900	Riquelme 3'; Moreno 11'; Gustavo Barros Schelotto 23'; Arruabarrena 28'; Bermúdez 42'		Calle 13'; Quintero 65'; Maldonado 89'	Stadium: La Bombonera; Referee: (Uruguay) Gustavo Méndez

==== Quarterfinals ====
17 May 2000	River Plate (Argentina)	2:1 (1:1)	(Argentina) Boca Juniors	Nuñez
	Ángel 14'; Saviola 46'	Report	Riquelme 30'	Stadium: Monumental; Referee: (Argentina) Claudio Martín

24 May 2000	Boca Juniors (Argentina)	3:0 (0:0)	(Argentina) River Plate	Buenos Aires
	Delgado 59'; Riquelme 79' (pen.); Palermo 94'	Report		Stadium: La Bombonera; Referee: (Argentina) Ángel Sánchez

==== Semifinals ====
31 May 2000	Boca Juniors (Argentina)	4:1	(Mexico) América	Buenos Aires
	Arruabarrena 9'; Barijho 11', 51'; Marchant 21'	Report	Silva 73'	Stadium: La Bombonera; Referee: (Chile) Mario Sánchez Yantén

7 June 2000	América (Mexico)	3:1	(Argentina) Boca Juniors	Mexico City
	Calderón 12', 81'; Estay 68'	Report	Samuel 83'	Stadium: Azteca; Referee: (Colombia) Óscar Ruiz

==== Final ====
14 June 2000	Boca Juniors (Argentina)	2 – 2	(Brazil) Palmeiras	Buenos Aires
21:40 (UTC−03:00)	Arruabarrena 22', 61'	(Report)	Pena 43'; Euller 63'	Stadium: La Bombonera; Attendance: 50,580; Referee: (Uruguay) Gustavo Méndez

21 June 2000	Palmeiras (Brazil)	0 – 0 (2 – 4 p)	(Argentina) Boca Juniors	São Paulo
21:40 (UTC−03:00)		(Report)		Stadium: Estádio Cícero Pompeu de Toledo (Morumbi); Attendance: 75,000; Referee: Epifanio González (Paraguay)
	Penalties
	Alex (penalty scored); Asprilla (penalty missed); Roque Júnior (penalty missed); Rogério (penalty scored)		(penalty scored) Schelotto; (penalty scored) Riquelme; (penalty scored) Palermo; (penalty scored) Bermúdez

== Statistics ==
=== Players statistics ===
No.	Pos	Nat	Player	Total		Apertura 99		Clausura 2000		Libertadores	
No.	Pos	Nat	Player	Apps	Goals	Apps	Goals	Apps	Goals	Apps	Goals
	GK	(Colombia) COL	Oscar Cordoba	45	0	19	0	12	0	14	0
	DF	(Argentina) ARG	Hugo Ibarra	44	0	15	0	16	0	13	0
	DF	(Colombia) COL	Jorge Bermudez	44	6	17	2	13	2	14	2
	DF	(Argentina) ARG	Walter Samuel	45	3	17	1	14	1	14	1
	DF	(Argentina) ARG	Rodolfo Arruabarrena	46	7	19	1	14	1	13	5
	MF	(Argentina) ARG	Christian Traverso	39	2	14	0	12	1	13	1
	MF	(Argentina) ARG	Gustavo Barros Schelotto	29	2	17	1	6	0	6	1
	MF	(Argentina) ARG	Sebastian Battaglia	31	0	3	0	15	0	13	0
	MF	(Argentina) ARG	Juan Roman Riquelme	35	7	17	2	7	2	11	3
	FW	(Argentina) ARG	Guillermo Barros Schelotto	36	12	13	6	14	5	9	1
	FW	(Argentina) ARG	Martin Palermo	21	19	13	14	4	4	4	1
	FW	(Argentina) ARG	Marcelo Delgado	19	4	0	0	11	3	8	1
	GK	(Argentina) ARG	Roberto Abbondanzieri	8	0	0	0	8	0	0	0
	GK	(Argentina) ARG	Christian Muñoz	0	0	0	0	0	0	0	0
	DF	(Argentina) ARG	Cesar Osvaldo La Paglia	16	1	11	0	3	1	2	0
	DF	(Argentina) ARG	Julio Marchant	20	3	0	0	11	1	9	2
	FW	(Argentina) ARG	Antonio Barijho	28	14	9	4	10	4	9	6
	DF	(Argentina) ARG	José Antonio Pereda	18	0	8	0	8	0	2	0
	MF	(Argentina) ARG	José Horacio Basualdo	24	0	6	0	10	0	8	0
	FW	(Argentina) ARG	Alfredo Moreno	24	13	5	1	11	6	8	6
	FW	(Argentina) ARG	Christian Giménez	13	2	4	1	4	1	5	0
	DF	(Argentina) ARG	Anibal Matellan	18	1	3	0	13	1	2	0
	DF	(Argentina) ARG	Omar Sebastián Pérez	4	0	0	0	3	0	1	0
	DF	(Argentina) ARG	Fernando Navas	17	1	2	0	8	1	7	0
	MF	(Argentina) ARG	Nicolas Burdisso	11	0	1	0	8	0	2	0
	MF	(Colombia) COL	Mauricio Serna	13	0	13	0	0	0	0	0
	DF	(Argentina) ARG	Emanuel Ruiz	11	0	7	0	4	0	0	0
	FW	(Argentina) ARG	Matías Sebastián Arce	4	2	0	0	4	2		
	DF	(Argentina) ARG	José María Calvo	3	0	0	0	3	0		
	DF	(Argentina) ARG	Gustavo Pinto	3	0	0	0	3	0		
	MF	(Argentina) ARG	Facundo Imboden	2	0	0	0	2	0		
	DF	(Argentina) ARG	Elías Bazzi	1	0	0	0	1	0		
	MF	(Argentina) ARG	Diego Cagna	18	3	18	3				
