= 2001 Intercontinental Cup =

Bayern Munich	Boca Juniors
(Germany)	(Argentina)
1	0
- After extra time
- Date: 27 November 2001
- Venue: National Stadium, Tokyo
- Man of the Match: Samuel Kuffour (Bayern Munich)
- Referee: Kim Milton Nielsen (Denmark)
- Attendance: 51,360
- Weather: Wind light 13.3 °C (55.9 °F); 36% humidity

The 2001 Intercontinental Cup was an association football match played on 27 November 2001 between Bayern Munich, winners of the 2000–01 UEFA Champions League, and winners of the 2001 Copa Libertadores, Boca Juniors, which was also the defending champions. The match was played at the neutral venue of the National Stadium in Tokyo in front of 51,360 fans. Samuel Kuffour was named as man of the match. This was the last Intercontinental Cup played in Tokyo, since International Stadium Yokohama in Yokohama was used from 2002 edition.

== Venue ==
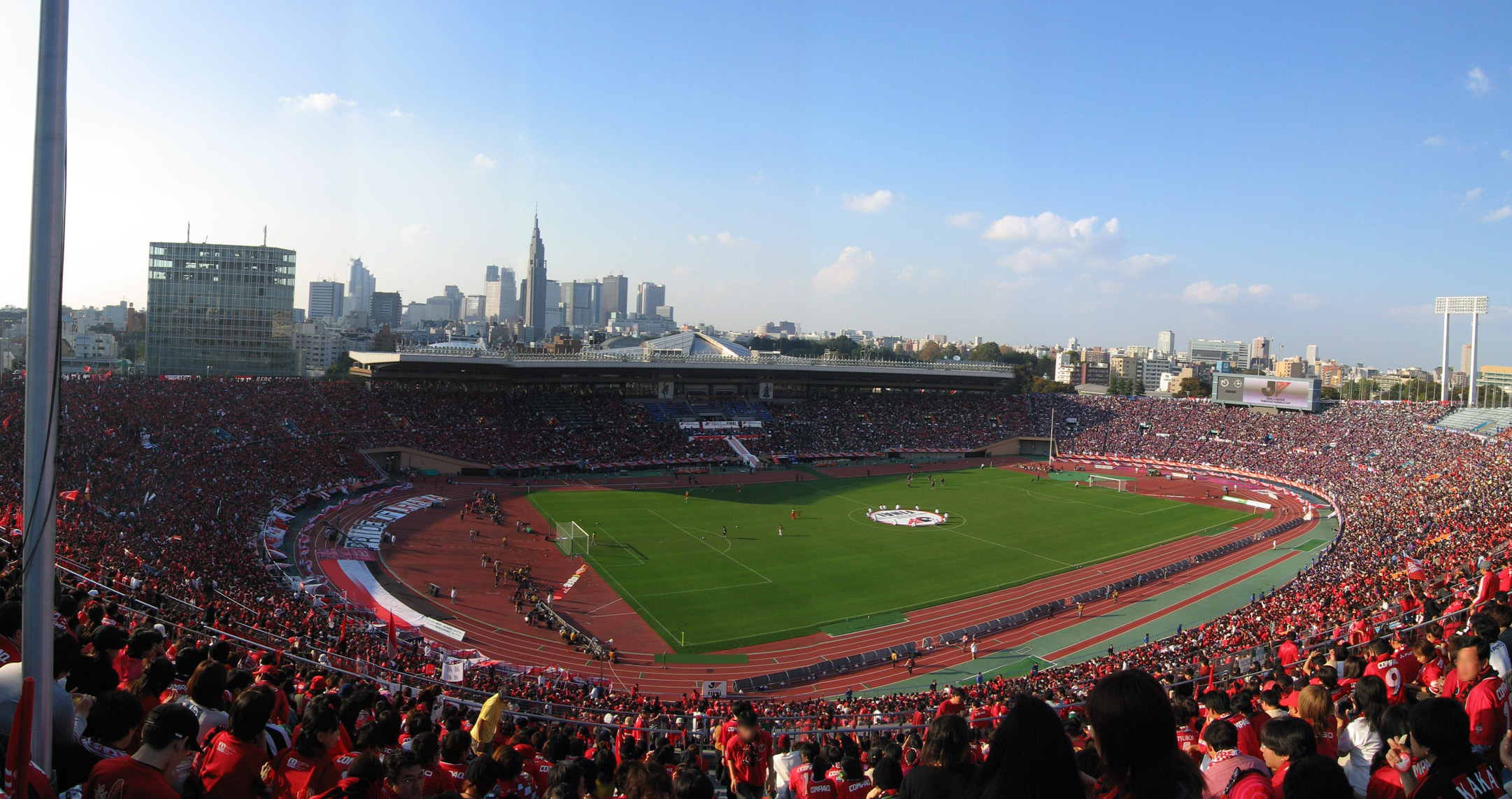
Olympic Stadium, Tokyo, hosted the final

== Match details ==
27 November 2001
19:20 JST

Bayern Munich (Germany)	1–0 (a.e.t.)	(Argentina) Boca Juniors
Kuffour 109'	Report

National Stadium, Tokyo
Attendance: 51,360
Referee: Kim Milton Nielsen (Denmark)

Bayern Munich	Boca Juniors

GK	1	(Germany) Oliver Kahn (c)
RB	2	(France) Willy Sagnol
CB	12	(Croatia) Robert Kovač
CB	4	(Ghana) Samuel Kuffour	(yellow card) 29'
LB	3	(France) Bixente Lizarazu
CM	23	(England) Owen Hargreaves	(yellow card) 72'	(substituted off) 76'
CM	8	(Croatia) Niko Kovač		(substituted off) 76'
CM	17	(Germany) Thorsten Fink
RF	13	(Brazil) Paulo Sérgio
CF	9	(Brazil) Giovane Élber	(yellow card) 106'
LF	14	(Peru) Claudio Pizarro		(substituted off) 118'
Substitutes:
GK	22	(Germany) Bernd Dreher
GK	33	(Germany) Stefan Wessels
DF	25	(Germany) Thomas Linke
MF	6	(Guinea) Pablo Thiam		(substituted on) 118'
MF	10	(Switzerland) Ciriaco Sforza		(substituted on) 76'
MF	30	(France) Alou Diarra
FW	19	(Germany) Carsten Jancker		(substituted on) 76'
Manager:
(Germany) Ottmar Hitzfeld

GK	1	(Colombia) Óscar Córdoba	(yellow card) 102'
CB	2	(Argentina) Nicolás Burdisso
CB	6	(Argentina) Rolando Schiavi	(yellow card) 111'
CB	13	(Argentina) Cristian Traverso
RWB	4	(Argentina) Jorge Martínez		(substituted off) 18'
LWB	14	(Argentina) Clemente Rodríguez	(yellow card) 70'
DM	5	(Colombia) Mauricio Serna (c)	(yellow card) 5'
RM	26	(Argentina) Javier Villarreal		(substituted off) 100'
LM	7	(Argentina) Guillermo Barros Schelotto	(yellow card) 83'
AM	10	(Argentina) Juan Román Riquelme
CF	16	(Argentina) Marcelo Delgado	(yellow card) 19' (red card) 46'
Substitutes:
GK	12	(Argentina) Roberto Abbondanzieri
DF	20	(Argentina) Joel Barbosa
DF	22	(Argentina) José María Calvo		(substituted on) 18'	(substituted off) 111'
MF	21	(Argentina) Christian Giménez
MF	28	(Argentina) Gustavo Pinto		(substituted on) 100'
FW	9	(Argentina) Antonio Barijho
FW	18	(Argentina) Ariel Carreño		(substituted on) 111'
Manager:
(Argentina) Carlos Bianchi

Man of the Match:
Samuel Kuffour (Bayern Munich)

Assistant referees:
Jørgen Jepsen (Denmark)
Mikael Nilsson (Sweden)
Fourth official:
Masayoshi Okada (Japan)

== See also ==
- 2000–01 UEFA Champions League
- 2001 Copa Libertadores
- FC Bayern Munich in international football competitions
