= Carlos Tevez =

Argentine footballer (born 1984)

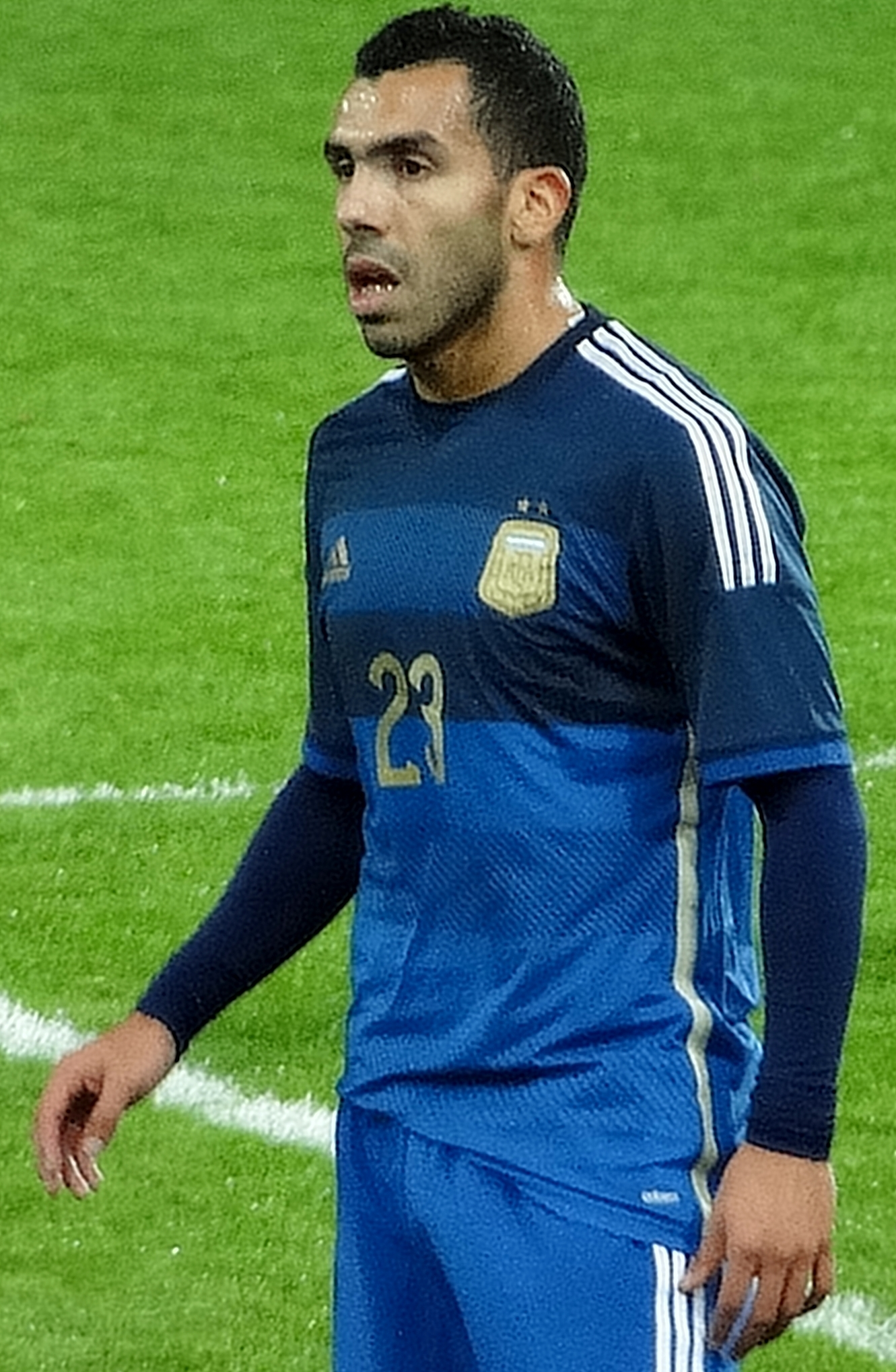
- Tevez with Argentina in 2014

Personal information
- Full name: Carlos Alberto Tevez
- Birth name: Carlos Alberto Martínez
- Date of birth: 5 February 1984 (age 42)
- Place of birth: Ciudadela, Buenos Aires, Argentina
- Height: 1.71 m (5 ft 7 in)
- Position: Forward

Youth career
- 1992–1997: All Boys
- 1997–2001: Boca Juniors

Senior career*
Years	Team	Apps	(Gls)
2001–2004	Boca Juniors	75	(26)
2005–2006	Corinthians	58	(38)
2006–2009	West Ham United	26	(7)
2007–2009	→ Manchester United (loan)	63	(19)
2009–2013	Manchester City	113	(58)
2013–2015	Juventus	66	(39)
2015–2016	Boca Juniors	34	(14)
2016–2018	Shanghai Shenhua	16	(4)
2018–2021	Boca Juniors	66	(22)
Total		517	(227)

International career
2001	Argentina U17	6	(2)
2004	Argentina U23	7	(9)
2004–2015	Argentina	76	(13)

Managerial career
- 2022: Rosario Central
- 2023–2024: Independiente
- 2025–2026: Talleres
Medal record
Men's football
Representing Argentina
Olympic Games
Gold medal – first place	2004 Athens	Team
CONMEBOL Pre-Olympic Tournament
Winner	2004 Chile
South American U-20 Championship
Winner	2003 Uruguay
Copa América
Runner-up	2004 Peru
Runner-up	2007 Venezuela
Runner-up	2015 Chile
FIFA Confederations Cup
Runner-up	2005 Germany
- * Club domestic league appearances and goals

Carlos Alberto Tevez (Latin American Spanish: [ˈkaɾlos ˈteβes]; né Martínez; born 5 February 1984) is an Argentine professional football manager and former player. A dynamic forward in his prime, Tevez was capable of playing as a striker, as a winger, as a supporting forward, or as an attacking midfielder.

Tevez began his career with Boca Juniors, winning the Copa Libertadores and Intercontinental Cup in 2003 before moving to Brazilian club Corinthians, where he won the league title. His moves to English clubs West Ham United in 2006 and Manchester United in 2007 were plagued by issues relating to his third-party ownership by Media Sports Investment, and their resulting sagas paved the way for changes to both Premier League and FIFA regulations. Tevez won six trophies at United, including two Premier League titles and a UEFA Champions League.

In 2009, Tevez joined Manchester United's rivals Manchester City. In the 2010–11 season he won the Premier League Golden Boot, and in the 2011–12 season he won another Premier League title. In 2013, he joined Juventus, where he won two Scudetti among other trophies. He returned to Boca Juniors in June 2015, before joining Chinese club Shanghai Shenhua the following years in a deal which made him one of the highest-paid footballers in the world. He again returned to Boca Juniors for a third spell in 2018, and won the 2017–18 and 2019–20 Primera División titles.

Tevez made his international debut for Argentina in 2004, earning 76 caps and scoring 13 times for the side. A gold medal and Summer Olympics Golden Boot winner at the 2004 Olympics, he also played at two FIFA World Cups, a FIFA Confederations Cup and four Copa América tournaments. He has been awarded the South American Footballer of the Year three times, the Footballer of the Year of Argentina twice, and the Argentine Sportsperson of the Year once. He has also been named in the South American Team of the Year three times. He announced his retirement from professional football in June 2022.

== Early life ==
Tevez was born Carlos Alberto Martínez by his mother's surname in Ciudadela, Buenos Aires Province, and raised in the neighbourhood of Ejército de Los Andes, better known as "Fuerte Apache". It was from there he received the nickname of "El Apache". His biological parents were Juan Alberto Cabral and Fabiana "Trina" Martínez. He was adopted by his maternal aunt Adriana Noemí Martínez and her husband Segundo Raimundo Tévez. His adopted parents changed his surname to his adopted father's during a conflict between his junior club All Boys and Boca Juniors.

Tevez has a distinctive burn scar that runs down his neck from his right ear to his chest. He was accidentally scalded with boiling water as a child, which caused third-degree burns and kept him hospitalised in intensive care for nearly two months. After joining Boca Juniors, Tevez refused an offer from the club to have them cosmetically improved, saying the scars were a part of who he was in the past and who he is today.

The early life of Tevez was featured in Apache: The Life of Carlos Tevez (Spanish: Apache: La vida de Carlos Tevez), an eight-part 2019 Argentine television series starring Balthazar Murillo, Sofía Gala and Vanesa González.

== Club career ==
=== Boca Juniors ===
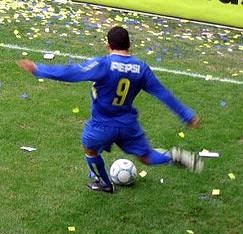
Tevez playing for Boca Juniors in 2004

At age 16, Tevez made his debut for Boca Juniors against Talleres de Córdoba in the Torneo Apertura of the 2001–02 Argentine Primera División, on 21 October 2001. Boca Juniors were crowned champions of the 2001 Copa Libertadores and faced Bayern Munich at the 2001 Intercontinental Cup on 27 November, where they lost 1–0, although Tevez was not included in the squad. He went on to score 1 goal in 11 league appearances in the 2001–02 season. Boca had finished in first place of their 2002 Copa Libertadores group and had reached the quarter-finals, where they faced Paraguay's Club Olimpia on 8 May. Tevez scored after 18 minutes in the first-leg to give Boca Juniors a 1–0 lead, until Olimpia levelled the scores in the 67th minute when Boca defender Cristian Traverso scored an own goal. Boca lost the second-leg 1–0 in Asunción on 16 May. Boca finished three points behind Independiente to finish in second position during the Torneo Apertura. Boca Juniors eventually finished four points behind River Plate to claim second position in the Torneo Clausura.

Tevez scored 10 goals in 32 appearances for Boca during the 2002–03 season. During the 2002 Copa Sudamericana, Boca were eliminated 3–1 on aggregate by Gimnasia de La Plata in the first round. Boca participated at the 2003 Copa Libertadores and reached the final of the competition, where they faced Santos. Boca won 5–1 on aggregate, with Tevez scoring in the 3–1 away win in the second leg. Tevez was also voted as the tournament's best player. Tevez scored 12 goals in 23 appearances during the 2003–04 season. Boca were crowned champions of the Torneo Apertura, where Tevez finished as the Apertura's seventh top goalscorer with eight goals. Boca then finished in second spot of the Torneo Clausura, four points behind River Plate. During the 2003 Copa Sudamericana, Boca Juniors reached the quarter-final stages where they were eliminated by Colombia's Atlético Nacional 5–1 on aggregate. During the 2003 Intercontinental Cup, Tevez, who had just returned to the side from injury, entered the field in the 73rd minute for Guillermo Barros Schelotto, as Boca Juniors defeated Milan 3–1 on penalties to claim the Intercontinental Cup.

Boca had reached the final of the 2004 Copa Sudamericana, where they beat Bolivia's Bolívar 2–1 on aggregate. Tevez scored in Boca's 2–0 second-leg win. Boca finished as runners-up of the 2004 Copa Libertadores. Tevez scored in both games of Boca's round of 16 wins against Peru's Club Sporting Cristal. Tevez also scored for Boca Juniors in their 2–1 second-leg loss to arch rivals River Plate, having drawn them level 2–2 on aggregate, which Boca went on to win 5–4 on penalties. Tevez was sent off for imitating a chicken when celebrating a goal against River Plate, clearly mocking the opposition crowd, with River called 'Gallinas' ('chickens') by other fans for their habit choking late on. Boca played against Colombia's Once Caldas in the final, where after drawing 1–1 on aggregate, Boca lost 2–0 on penalties. Tevez scored two goals in nine league appearances in the Torneo Apertura of the 2004–05 season. Boca Juniors faced Peru's Cienciano in the 2004 Recopa Sudamericana on 7 September. Tevez scored after 33 minutes to give Boca Juniors a 1–0 lead, but Cienciano equalised and the match was decided by a penalty shoot-out. Boca lost 4–2 on penalties, where Tevez had failed to convert his side's second spot-kick.

During his time at Boca Juniors, Tevez was listed by the media as a potential heir to Diego Maradona, whose number 10 shirt he had inherited at the club.

=== Corinthians ===
In January 2005, Tevez was transferred to Campeonato Brasileiro Série A club Corinthians for $16 million cash and youth players worth $2 million. Kia Joorabchian and Tevez also received an additional 15% and 10% transfer fee respectively. The transfer fee has also been reported as $22 million. Tevez signed a five-year, £6.85 million contract following the Brazilian club's deal with Media Sports Investment (MSI). The deal was the biggest transfer ever in South American football. Investigation by Brazilian police later revealed MSI owned 35% of the player rights (through BVI company MSI Group Limited) while another 65% owned by Just Sport Limited, another BVI company.

Tevez made his debut for the club on 29 January, in a 1–0 victory against America-SP. He scored his first goal on 5 February, in a 2–0 away victory against Inter de Limeira. Five days later, he scored a brace in a 3–1 victory against Rio Branco. Tevez ended the Campeonato Paulista with seven goals in 13 games.

On 21 April, during the Copa do Brasil QF, Tevez scored in a 2–0 win against Figueirense. Tevez played in the second leg, which ended in a penalty shootout victory for Figueirense, as they had levelled the aggregate score at 2–2. During the cup campaign, Tevez scored four goals.

Tevez began the Campeonato Brasileiro by scoring on the first matchday, a 2–2 draw against Juventude. During the campaign, Tevez scored multiple important goals, such as a brace at home to Coritiba, followed by braces away from home against Ponte Preta and Flamengo. He also scored a hat trick in a 7–1 victory over Santos on 6 November. With 20 goals, Tevez captained Timão to the league title, and was named the league's best player by the Brazilian Football Confederation, becoming the first non-Brazilian player to win the award since 1976.

After scoring in a match against Fortaleza in July 2006, Tevez celebrated by putting his index finder to his mouth to make a gesture asking for silence, a gesture which angered the Corinthians supporters; reports said that the fans later damaged his car. In response to the incident, Tevez apologized for the gesture, but threatened to leave the club if the violence continued, also adding that he would not take his daughter and wife to the stadium anymore. With the arrival of new manager Émerson Leão in August 2006, who stripped Tevez of the captaincy, Tevez requested to exit the club, saying that he would "not play as long as Leão is in charge". The Argentine striker's last match for the club was on 20 August 2006, a 1–0 victory at home to Botafogo.

Despite altercations with Marquinhos, Carlos Alberto, and some fans, Tevez left a legacy at the club. In a 2020 survey by GloboEsporte, Tevez was voted into the club's ideal XI for the 21st century. He had the third most votes, only behind Ronaldo Nazario and Marcelinho. Also that year, fans were asked in a survey if they wanted Tevez to return to Corinthians, with over 85% saying yes.

=== West Ham United ===
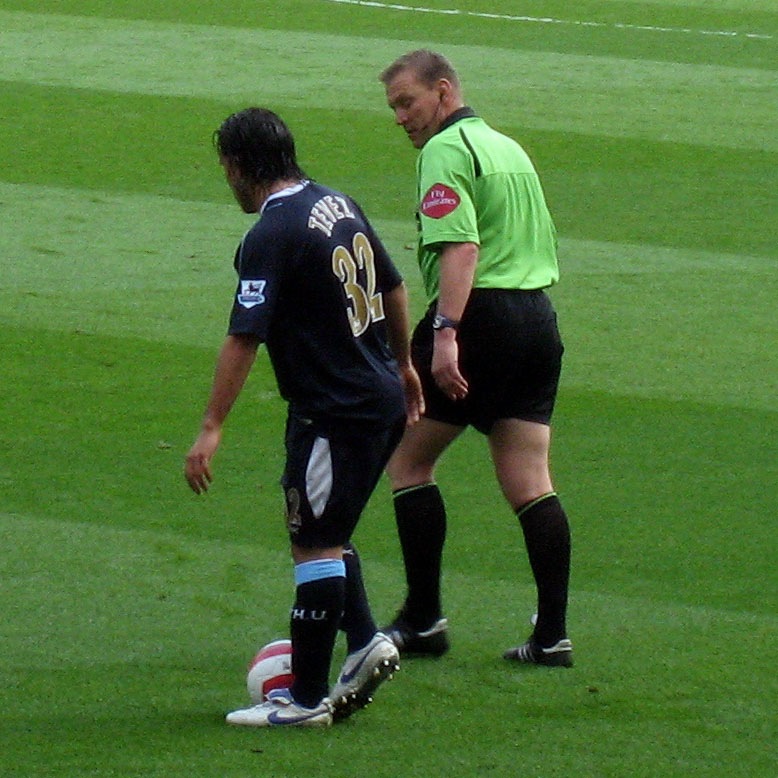
Tevez with West Ham United in April 2007

Tevez confirmed on his website on 31 August that both he and Corinthians teammate Javier Mascherano were signing for West Ham United on permanent deals for undisclosed fees.

Tevez made his West Ham debut after coming on as a second-half substitute in the 1–1 home draw with Aston Villa on 10 September 2006. However, after this match, West Ham went on a nine-game winless streak (one draw and eight defeats), which included seven consecutive matches without scoring. This winless run also included going out of both the UEFA Cup and League Cup. In November of the same season, Tevez left the ground early after being substituted and throwing a tantrum during a league match against Sheffield United, and as punishment, his teammates decided Tevez had to donate half of a week's wages to charity and train in a Brazil jersey. Tevez refused to wear the shirt, saying, "I played in Brazil and have a great respect for Brazil and Brazilians but I'm Argentine and won't wear that shirt."

On 6 January 2007, Tevez made his first start for West Ham under the new management of Alan Curbishley in a 3–0 FA Cup third round victory over Brighton & Hove Albion. He scored his first West Ham goal and assisted two others on 4 March 2007 in a 4–3 home defeat to Tottenham Hotspur. In April 2007, West Ham were fined a record £5.5 million for breaching Premier League rules over the signings of Tevez and Mascherano. Nonetheless, Tevez was cleared to play for West Ham by the Premier League after changes were planned to be made to a third-party agreement related to him. That same month, Tevez was named the club's Hammer of the Year.

In relegation-threatened West Ham's final league match of the season against Manchester United on 13 May, Tevez scored the only goal in a 1–0 victory. The match result secured West Ham's stay in the top flight after Sheffield United's failure to beat Wigan Athletic at home on the same day.

==== 2007 transfer saga ====
In June 2007, Tevez rejected a move to Inter Milan, and his representative, Kia Joorabchian, stated that he was in discussions to stay with West Ham, as the player had settled into the Premier League and wanted to remain in England. Tevez replied that he would not make a decision until the Copa América concluded in July.

On 5 July, it was reported that Tevez had agreed to join Manchester United. West Ham said they would block any transfer unless they received a majority of the transfer fee. The next day, West Ham released a statement saying Tevez was under contract until June 2010, in addition to denying having held negotiations with any other club. Joorabchian contradicted the claim by stating West Ham had given permission to United to engage in talks.

Manchester United and West Ham sought FIFA's assistance to rule on Tevez's ownership, but on 24 July, FIFA suggested the case be referred to the Court of Arbitration for Sport. Joorabchian intervened by issuing West Ham with a High Court writ "...to compel West Ham to release the registration of Carlos Tevez in accordance with contracts entered into between the parties". However, the case never made it to court as the Premier League approved an agreement between West Ham and MSI in which MSI would pay £2 million to West Ham, who in turn released Tevez from his contract.

==== Sheffield United controversy ====
Sheffield United were relegated after their loss to Wigan Athletic on the final day of the 2006–07 season, while West Ham United narrowly avoided relegation by beating the newly crowned champions Manchester United 1–0 on the same day, finishing three points ahead of Sheffield United and having a superior goal difference to them by one. The Premier League fined West Ham a record £5.5 million in the signing of Tevez and compatriot Javier Mascherano. They were found to have been partially owned by businessman Kia Joorabchian's Media Sports Investment (MSI) company.

As a result, Sheffield United first appealed to the league for reinstatement to the Premier League. After this claim failed, the club sought damages from West Ham arising from the relegation. Initial media reports suggested Sheffield United sought £30 million, which they believed was the true cost of relegation. The controversy continued for nearly two years, interspersed with various differing media reports and speculations. However, on 17 March 2009, both clubs reached an out-of-court settlement to end their dispute, whereby West Ham paid £20 million (£4 million per year over the next five seasons) as compensation to Sheffield United.

=== Manchester United ===
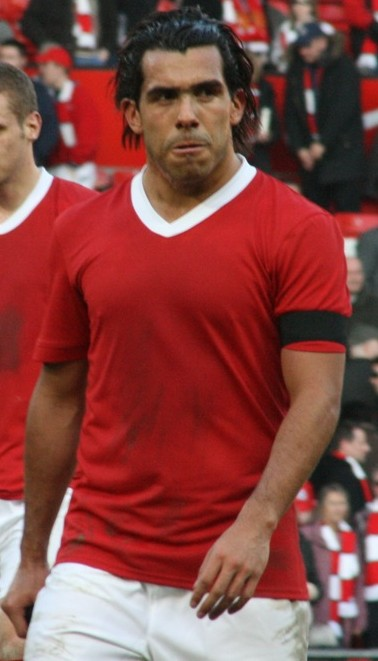
Tevez playing for Manchester United in February 2008

Manchester United put forward a proposed two-year loan deal for Tevez, which was approved on 10 August 2007. He made his debut on 15 August when he started in place of the injured Wayne Rooney in a 1–1 draw against Portsmouth. On 23 September, he scored his first goal in a 2–0 home victory against Chelsea. In November, United manager Sir Alex Ferguson confirmed the club wanted to sign Tevez permanently, saying, "He'll get me 15 goals this season, and what's more, they'll be important goals." Tevez was greeted with an ovation and singing of "There's Only One Carlos Tevez" from the West Ham supporters upon his return to Upton Park for an away match (lost by Manchester United) on 29 December.

Tevez scored a total of five goals during Manchester United's successful 2007–08 UEFA Champions League campaign. He also scored the first penalty in the shoot-out against Chelsea in the final, which Manchester United won 6–5 after the match had ended 1–1 after extra time.

Tevez scored his first league goal of the 2008–09 season on 13 September 2008 in a 2–1 away defeat to Liverpool, and his first hat-trick came on 3 December 2008, when he scored a quartet of goals in United's 5–3 League Cup win over Blackburn Rovers in the fifth round. His first UEFA Champions League goal of the season, against Aalborg BK on 10 December, was the fastest goal scored in the tournament for 2008–09 at two minutes and 41 seconds.

On 21 December, Tevez started for United in the 2008 FIFA Club World Cup Final, which United won 1–0 over Ecuadorean club LDU Quito, but he was substituted in the 51st minute for Jonny Evans after Nemanja Vidić was sent off.

On 10 May 2009, Tevez was reported as saying that he believed his time at Manchester United would come to an end that summer and he expressed his dissatisfaction at not having been offered a permanent contract with the club and having been dropped from the team despite, in his opinion, not having played badly. Despite this outburst, Tevez was named in Manchester United's starting 11 for the derby match against Manchester City later that day, before scoring the second of United's two goals on the stroke of half-time, which prompted chants of "Fergie, sign him up" from some of the club's fans. After the match, Ferguson refused to be drawn on the subject of Tevez's future with the club, saying, "I didn't read any of the papers. He's a Manchester United player."

The following match for Manchester United was away at Wigan. Tevez did not start the match, but came off the bench on 58 minutes and scored the equaliser three minutes later with a flamboyant back-heeled finish. His introduction immediately improved the team's play and Michael Carrick scored the winner on 86 minutes. After the game, to the relief of most United fans, Ferguson announced the club had commenced talks to sign Tevez on a permanent deal. Tevez started the next match against Arsenal, but was substituted by Park Ji-sung in the 66th minute. As he left the field, the Manchester United supporters applauded him in what would be his last match at Old Trafford for United. United chief executive David Gill suggested that Tevez's future would be resolved by early June 2009. Although United agreed to meet the option fee of £25.5 million and offered Tevez a five-year contract that would have made him one of the club's top earners, Tevez's advisors informed the club he no longer wished to play for Manchester United. Nevertheless, reports also emerged that Tevez had ruled out signing for Liverpool, given the implications of a Manchester United player moving to join their north-west rivals. Tevez later claimed that a move to Real Madrid had been agreed during the presidency of Ramón Calderón, with contractual terms finalized and discussions held with Calderón and sporting director Predrag Mijatović; however, the deal collapsed after Calderón left the club, which he believed voided the agreement.

=== Manchester City ===
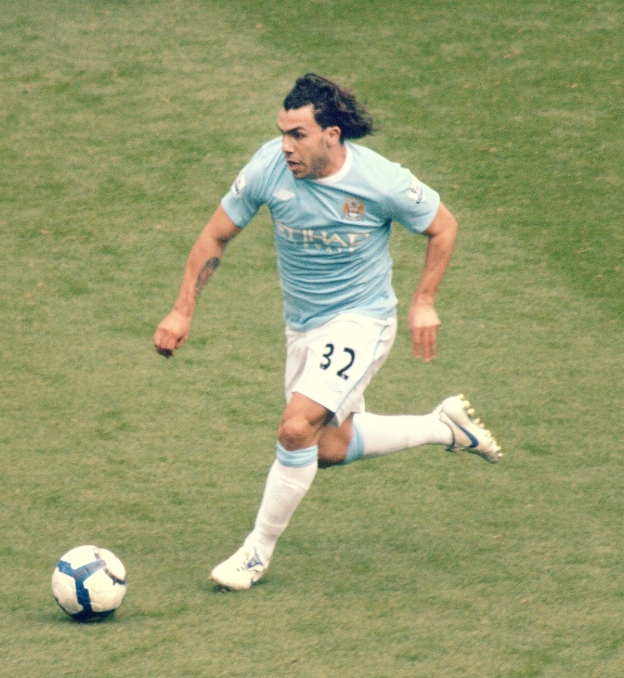
Tevez joined Manchester United's cross-town rivals, Manchester City, after his contract with United ran out in July 2009

After protracted negotiations, Tevez signed a five-year contract with Manchester United's cross-town rivals, Manchester City, after a medical on 14 July 2009. On 12 September, it was claimed the transfer fee was £47 million, a British transfer record, but this was later denied by both Manchester City and MSI. Tevez was given the number 32 shirt, just as he was at Manchester United and West Ham. In signing for Manchester City, Tevez became the first player to move between the two Manchester clubs since Terry Cooke moved from United to City in 1999. After signing Tevez, Manchester City erected a blue "Welcome to Manchester" billboard with Tevez in the background. The billboard was located at the top of Deansgate in the Manchester city centre, which leads to Salford and Trafford, where Old Trafford is outside the boundaries of the City of Manchester.

Tevez made his City debut coming off the bench against Blackburn Rovers in a 2–0 away win. He scored his first goal for the club on 27 August 2009 against Crystal Palace in the second round of the League Cup, heading-in City's second goal in a 2–0 victory.

in September 2009, Tevez suffered a knee injury while on international duty with Argentina, which would keep him out for two to three weeks, forcing him to miss the match against Arsenal. It was also thought Tevez would miss the Manchester derby the following weekend, but he recovered in time to play in the match. He set up his side's first goal for Gareth Barry, but City ended up losing 4–3.

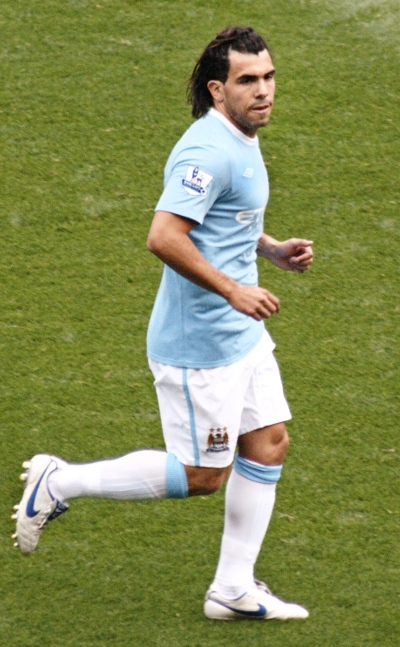
Tévez playing for Manchester City during the 2009–10 season

Tevez scored his first and second Premier League goals for the club during a 3–1 win over his former club, West Ham, prompting City fans to imitate the chant, "Fergie, sign him up." Later that week, he scored the third goal in Manchester City's 5–1 win over Scunthorpe United in the League Cup, and three weeks later, he scored his third successive cup goal in the quarter-finals against Arsenal. The following week, he scored the winner in a 2–1 win over Chelsea. One week later he scored twice in a 3–3 draw with Bolton Wanderers. His next two goals came against Sunderland and Stoke City, scoring six goals in as many matches. On 28 December, he continued his goalscoring run, scoring two against Wolverhampton Wanderers, making it eight goals in seven matches. Tevez scored his first Premier League hat-trick for Manchester City on 11 January 2010 in a 4–1 home win over Blackburn, coincidentally on the same night he received his first ever Premier League Player of the Month award for December 2009.

On 19 January 2010, Tevez spearheaded City's attack as the club defeated Manchester United in the first leg of the League Cup semi-final at the City of Manchester Stadium. Despite United taking a 1–0 lead, Tevez hit the equaliser in from the penalty spot before heading the winner in the 65th minute. On 27 January, Tevez scored his and Manchester City's third goal of the tie in the second leg at Old Trafford. However, a stoppage-time goal from Wayne Rooney sent Manchester United through to the final with a 4–3 aggregate win.

On 27 February 2010, Tevez scored two goals against Chelsea in a 4–2 away win over the league leaders, following his return from compassionate leave in Argentina. On 29 March 2010, Tevez scored his second Premier League hat-trick for Manchester City against Wigan in a 3–0 victory. At the end of his first year at Manchester City, he was given two club awards, the Etihad Player of the Year award and the Players' Player of the Year award.

On 18 August 2010, Tevez was made club captain by manager Roberto Mancini, replacing defender Kolo Touré. Tevez continued his scoring form in the Premier League from 2009–10 in the 2010–11 season with two goals in the 3–0 victory over Liverpool. Against Wigan, Tevez scored again in a 2–0 win. He continued his goalscoring run in a 1–0 win against Chelsea, taking his tally to six goals in five matches. He scored a penalty in a 2–1 home win against Newcastle United, then followed up with two more goals against Blackpool in a 3–2 away win.

In December 2010, despite his agent recently asking the club to renegotiate and improve his contract, Tevez handed the club a written transfer request, citing family reasons and a breakdown in "relationship with certain executives and individuals at the club". The transfer request was rejected by the club, with a senior club official describing Tevez's reasons for wanting to leave as "ludicrous and nonsensical", while the club also stated the player would not be sold in the January transfer window and would seek compensation for breach of contract from his agent if he retired or refused to play.

On 20 December 2010, Tevez withdrew his transfer request and expressed his "absolute commitment" to Manchester City following "clear-the-air" talks. On 26 December 2010, Tevez scored twice as City won 3–1 away at Newcastle. Further goals against Leicester City, Wolverhampton Wanderers, West Bromwich Albion, Birmingham City and Notts County took him to 50 goals for the club. The mere 73 matches played to reach this figure made him the second-fastest player in City's history to reach that figure, behind Derek Kevan's 64-game record.

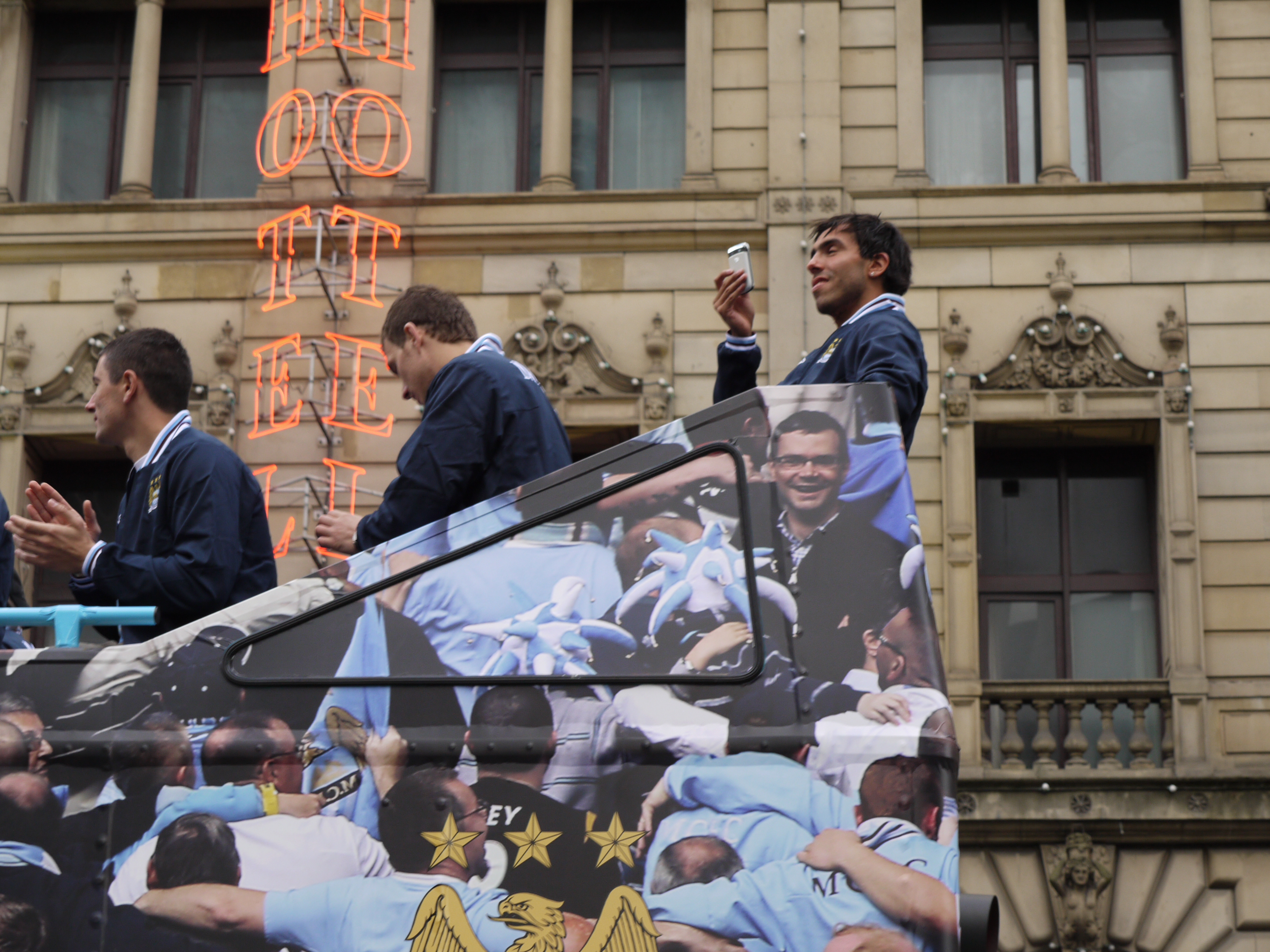
Tevez on the FA Cup victory parade in Manchester in May 2011

After missing the 1–0 FA Cup semi-final victory over Manchester United at Wembley Stadium due to a hamstring injury, Tevez returned to captain City on 14 May 2011 in the 1–0 final over Stoke City. Two days later, amid rumours of his departure to Italy in the summer, he announced his desire to stay at Eastlands. However, on 8 June, he told an Argentine chat show host that he "would not even return there on vacation".

Due to his commitments to the national team in the summer, Tevez was not on the bench for City in the first Premier League match of the 2011–12 season against Swansea City. Tevez made his first appearance of the season in City's second match of the season against Bolton Wanderers, coming on in the 68th minute for fellow Argentine Sergio Agüero. Despite losing the captain's armband to Vincent Kompany, Tevez stated in an interview he had a complete turn around on his stance on Manchester and that he is not moving: "I'm happy at City and I'm not moving from there." Tevez started his first match of the season against Wigan Athletic, in which Tevez missed a penalty that was won by David Silva; nonetheless, he played well in the match which ended 3–0 to City, with Agüero scoring a hat-trick. On 14 September, Tevez made an appearance in City's first ever UEFA Champions League match, against Napoli, coming on as a second-half substitute for Edin Džeko in a 1–1 draw.

==== Bayern Munich dispute ====
On 27 September 2011, Tevez was named as a substitute for City's game at Bayern Munich. Mancini claimed Tevez refused to come on as a substitute in the second half, when City was 2–0 down to Bayern, although Tevez denied this calling it a misunderstanding. Tevez's actions received widespread condemnation from various pundits and commentators, with Mancini claiming he wanted Tevez "out of Manchester City", and that he would never play for the club again. Tevez was suspended by Manchester City for a maximum period of two weeks as the club began an investigation into whether he refused to come on as a substitute. Following discussions with Mancini, club owner Sheikh Mansour authorised the placing of Tevez on garden leave where the Argentinian would be paid in full but instructed to stay away from the Manchester City training ground.

==== Return to first team ====
Having failed to secure a transfer, Tevez was fined several weeks' wages and denied a loyalty bonus, but returned to Manchester and resumed training on 14 February 2012, with the backing of his fellow players. Mancini had previously stated he was ready to welcome Tevez to the fold to boost their bid for the Premier League title. On 21 February, Tevez publicly apologised "sincerely and unreservedly" for his conduct, and withdrew his appeal over the city's decision to severely fine him. However, he was omitted from the club's 2011–12 UEFA Europa League squad. On 23 February, Mancini drew a line under his dispute with Tevez and insisted Tevez was available for selection.

Tevez made his return to the Manchester City first-team in a 2–1 home victory against Chelsea on 21 March, coming on for Nigel de Jong in the 66th minute before providing the assist for Samir Nasri's winning goal. His first goal of the season came four matches later, the third goal in a 4–0 home win against West Brom on 11 April. On 14 April, Tevez scored a hat-trick and provided an assist for Sergio Agüero in a 6–1 away win against Norwich City. He celebrated his third strike with a golf swing, in response to the pundits who questioned his desire during his leave of absence in which he was pictured on the golf course. He also played in City's title-winning match against Queens Park Rangers on 13 May.

On 12 August 2012, Tevez scored Manchester City's second goal in a 3–2 win over Chelsea in the 2012 Community Shield. The following weekend, he scored City's first goal of the 2012–13 Premier League season, against Southampton. On 26 August, Tevez scored his third goal in three matches in a 2–2 draw with Liverpool, his 100th goal in English football. The following week, he scored the final goal in a 3–1 win over QPR to become the first Manchester City player to score 50 goals for the club in the Premier League. On 3 November, when City met West Ham at Upton Park, Tevez received a warm welcome from West Ham fans; he responded by giving them a cross-armed "Hammers" salute. Speaking after the match, Tevez said, "I have always had a fantastic relationship with the West Ham supporters. They were singing my name before the game and that's why I did that (Hammers salute), in tribute to them. I've always felt really at home there."

On 19 January 2013, it was reported Tevez had revealed he nearly retired from professional football in 2012 in the midst of his Manchester City and Argentina crisis. He also spoke about his future and when he would return to Argentina: "I've already said I want to retire wearing a Boca shirt, it's my dream as well as my family's. After the World Cup, we'll see. I could finish my contract next year and go to Boca."

=== Juventus ===
==== 2013–14 season ====
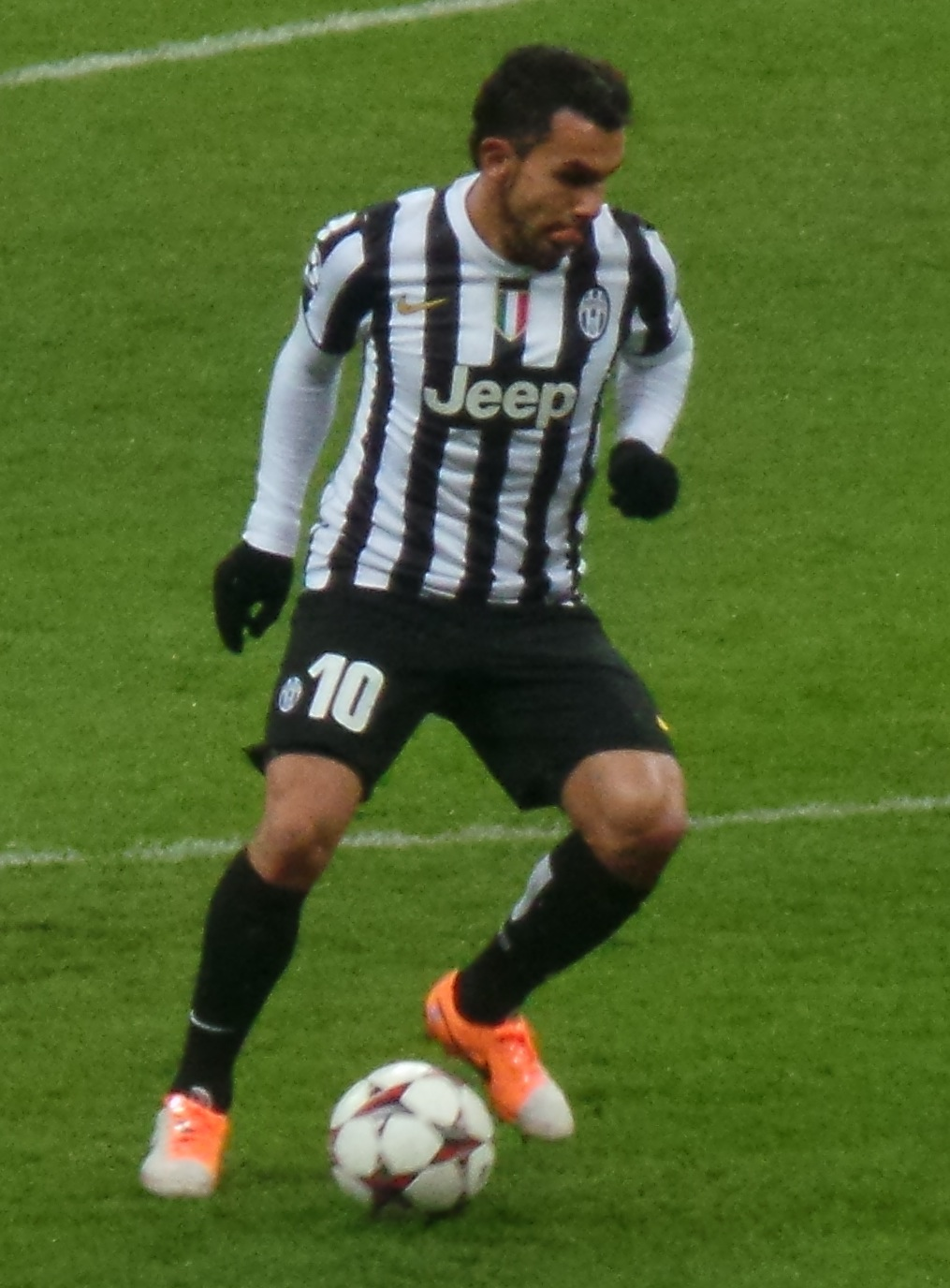
Tevez playing for Juventus in December 2013

On 26 June 2013, Tevez signed a three-year contract with Juventus for a reported £12 million, with the fee subject to performance. The fee combined with wages and bonuses due to Tevez in the final year of his contract was estimated to save Manchester City about £27 million. He was assigned the number 10 shirt, which had last been worn by the club's all-time top goalscorer and appearance holder Alessandro Del Piero in 2012.

On 18 August 2013, Tevez made his competitive debut for Juventus, scoring the fourth goal in a 4–0 rout of Lazio in the 2013 Supercoppa Italiana. On 24 August, he made his first appearance in Serie A, scoring the only goal as Juventus beat Sampdoria 1–0 in their opening match of the 2013–14 season.

On 15 December 2013, Tevez scored his first hat-trick for Juve in a 4–0 Serie A win against Sassuolo at Juventus Stadium. On 23 February 2014, he scored the only goal in Juve's 1–0 victory against Torino in the Derby della Mole.

Tevez ended the season as the team's top goalscorer with 21 goals in all competitions, and was named as Juve's "Player of the Season". He was the third-highest goalscorer in Serie A with 19 goals, as the Bianconeri won a 30th Scudetto.

==== 2014–15 season ====
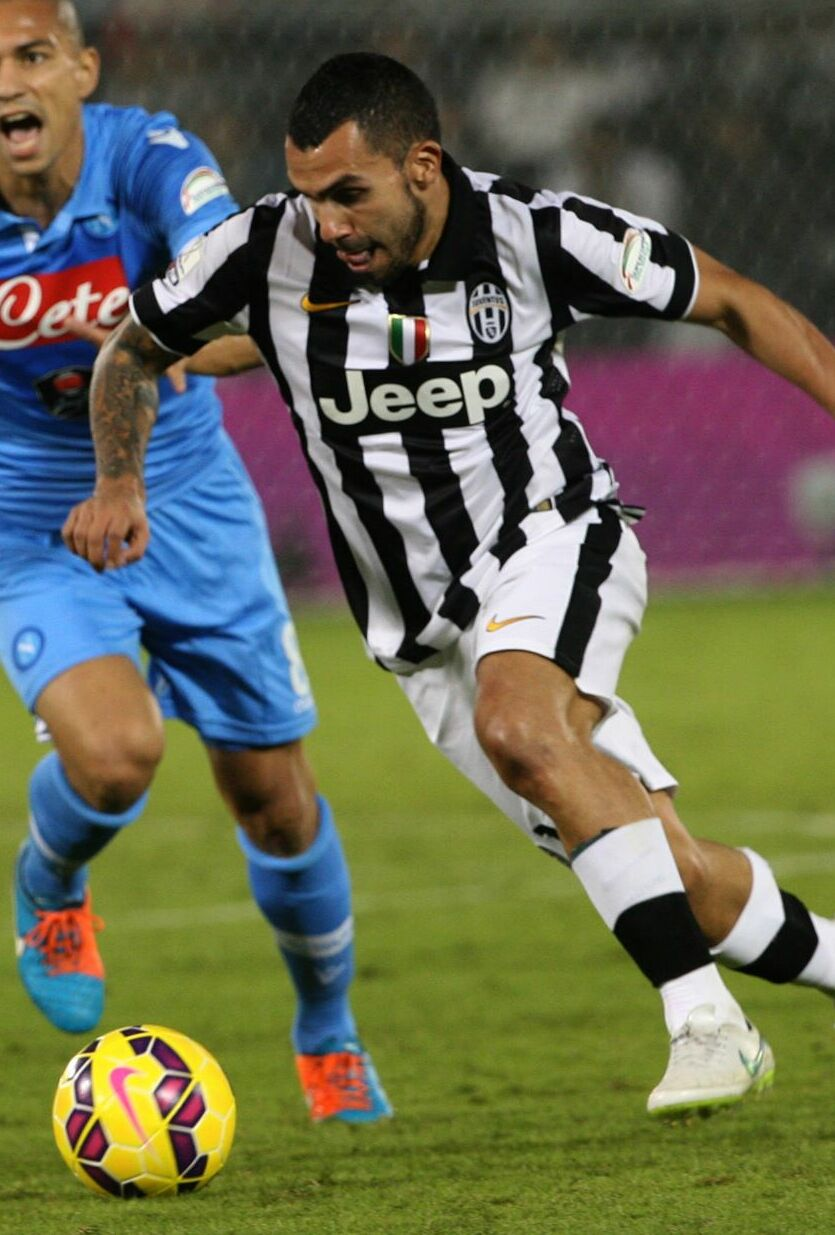
Tevez playing for the Bianconeri in December 2014

On 16 September 2014, Tevez scored twice in Juventus' 2–0 win against Malmö FF in the group stage of the 2014–15 Champions League, his first goals in the competition since 2009. He scored another brace in the 2014 Supercoppa Italiana against Napoli in Doha on 22 December, but hit the post with the first attempt as Juventus lost in a penalty shoot-out.

On 24 February 2015, Tevez scored the opening goal in Juventus's 2–1 defeat of Borussia Dortmund in the Champions League round of 16 first leg. Three weeks later, he scored twice and assisted another at the Westfalenstadion as Juve beat the German club 3–0 to qualify for the quarter-finals. On 5 May, Tevez scored from a penalty to give Juventus a 2–1 victory against defending champions Real Madrid in the first leg of the UEFA Champions League semi-final, at Juventus Stadium in Turin; this was his 50th goal for Juventus.

Tevez ended the Serie A season with 20 goals, helping Juventus to a fourth consecutive Scudetto. On 6 June 2015, he started in the 2015 Champions League final as Juventus was defeated 3–1 by Barcelona at Berlin's Olympiastadion. Tevez was involved in Álvaro Morata's temporary equaliser, as he scored from a rebound after Barcelona's goalkeeper Marc-André ter Stegen had parried the Argentine's initial shot.

=== Return to Boca Juniors ===
==== 2015 season ====
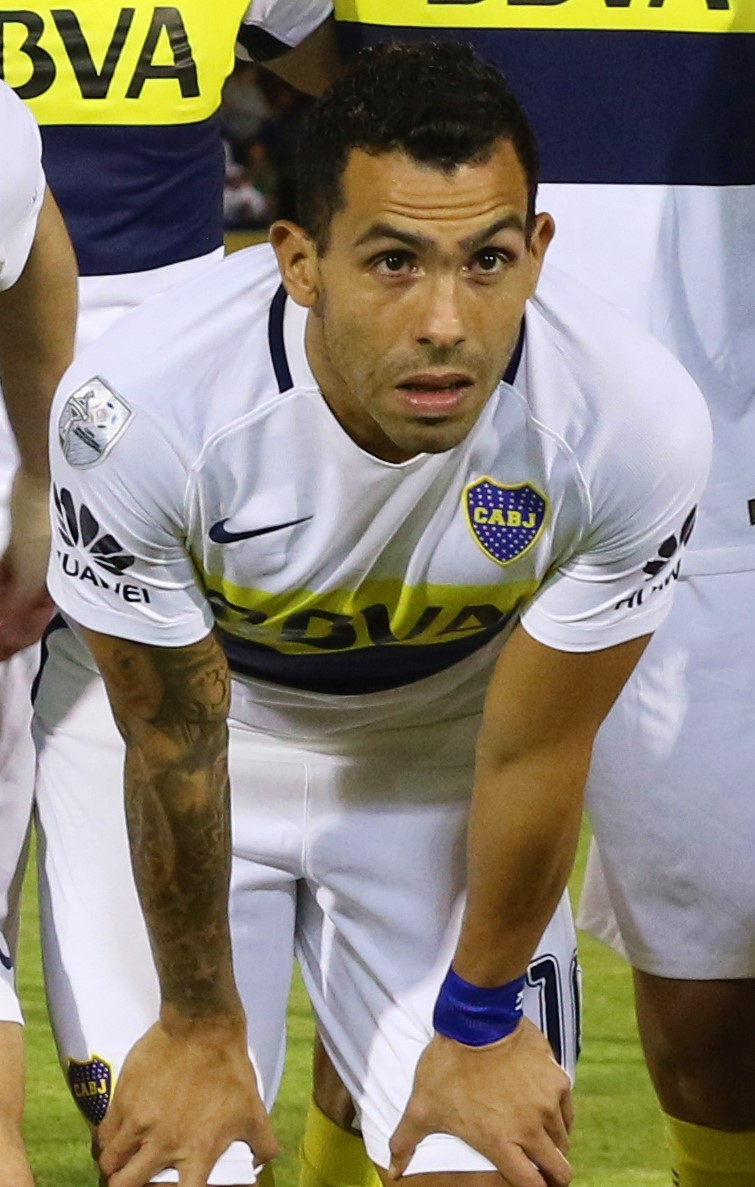
Tevez with Boca Juniors in July 2016

On 26 June 2015, while representing Argentina at the 2015 Copa América, Tevez returned to his first club Boca Juniors to pursue his dream of winning the Argentine Primera División. On 13 July 2015, Juventus confirmed Tevez had transferred to Boca Juniors for a fee of €6.5 million, but in a pure players swap deal. On 15 July 2015, Tevez was named to the ten-man shortlist for the 2015 UEFA Best Player in Europe Award, where it was announced on 12 August he placed ninth. Tevez made his first appearance since his return to the club on 18 July in a 2–1 win over Quilmes, and scored his first goal from a free-kick on 29 July in a 3–0 win over Banfield in the last 32 of the Copa Argentina. Four days later, he scored the first league goal of his return in an eventual 3–4 home loss to Unión. Tevez had a large impact, scoring 9 goals in 15 matches as he finished the 2015 season by achieving his goal of winning the Argentine Primera División and Copa Argentina double with Boca Juniors, becoming the first footballer to win two domestic league and cup doubles in one calendar year. On 14 December 2015, Tevez was named the 2014–15 Serie A Footballer of the Year.

==== 2016 season ====
Tevez was criticised in the media for his negative performance following Boca's 4–0 defeat to San Lorenzo in the 2015 Supercopa Argentina on 10 February 2016. On 20 April 2016, Tevez scored two goals in a 6–2 win over Deportivo Cali, which allowed Boca to top their Copa Libertadores group and advance to the round of 16 unbeaten. On 5 May, he scored from a penalty and later set up a goal for teammate Cristian Pavón as Boca defeated Cerro Porteño 3–1 at home in the second leg of the round of 16 of the Copa Libertadores to advance to the quarter-finals, following a 5–2 win on aggregate. On 19 May, he scored Boca's first penalty in their 4–3 home shootout victory over Nacional, in the second leg of the Copa Libertadores quarter-finals, following a 2–2 draw on aggregate, to help his team to advance to the semi-finals of the tournament for the first time since 2012. However, Boca were eliminated 5–3 on aggregate by Independiente in the semi-finals of the competition, on 14 July. On 11 December, Tevez scored a match-winning brace in a 4–2 away win in the Superclásico against rivals River Plate.

=== Shanghai Shenhua ===
On 29 December 2016, Tevez signed for Chinese Super League club Shanghai Shenhua, on a reported annual salary of $41 million, which would make him the world's highest-paid football player. Tevez subsequently played down the reports he became the highest-paid player in the world following his move, saying, "My salary isn't as high as the legends."

He made his league debut on 5 March in the first round of the 2017 Chinese Super League against Jiangsu Suning, also scoring his first goal in the match, from the penalty spot in the first half in his team's 4–0 win. He also assisted his club's first and fourth goals, both scored by Giovanni Moreno.

He was criticised by manager, Wu Jingui during his time in Shanghai for being overweight and unfit to play. Tevez described his time in China as a "holiday".

=== Third spell at Boca Juniors ===
On 5 January 2018, Boca Juniors announced on their social media that Tevez had rejoined the club.

He won the 2017–18 and 2019–20 Primera División titles with the team.

On 4 June 2021, Tevez announced that he would be leaving Boca Juniors. In a press conference, Tevez said that he was "physically fit to continue but not mentally" and that he can continue to play "at the age of 42, but not in Boca Juniors". He also thanked the club and left the option open for an offer to continue playing elsewhere. In June 2022, Tevez announced his retirement from professional football. He attributed his decision to retire to the loss of his father, Segundo, whom he called his "number one fan", to COVID-19 in February 2021.

His official farewell match is scheduled to take place in December of 2026 at La Bombonera Stadium in Buenos Aires, with Cristiano Ronaldo and Lionel Messi agreeing to play together on the same team in his honor.

== International career ==
=== Early international career ===
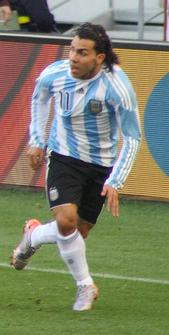
Tevez with Argentina in 2010

Tevez first came into prominence with Argentina while playing in the 2001 FIFA U-17 World Championship. At the 2004 Olympic Games in Greece, he won the gold medal – Argentina's first in any event since 1952 – and scored eight goals in six matches to be the top scorer of the competition. This included the winner in the final against Paraguay, two in a 6–0 group-stage rout of Serbia and Montenegro, and a hat-trick in a 4–0 quarter-final win over Costa Rica. Tevez represented Argentina's senior team in the 2004 Copa América, where the team reached the final, only to lose out to rivals Brazil on penalties; he scored a goal in both of the preceding rounds. He was the world's second-highest goalscorer of 2004 in overall international competition with 16 goals, one fewer than Iran forward Ali Daei.

He was also a member of Argentina's 2005 FIFA Confederations Cup squad that lost again to Brazil in the final. Tevez was called up for the 2006 FIFA World Cup finals, and scored his only goal of the tournament in Argentina's 6–0 group stage thrashing of Serbia and Montenegro on 16 June, as a substitute for Javier Saviola. He was also a member of the Argentina squad which reached the 2007 Copa América Final. Five minutes after coming on for Lionel Messi, he scored to conclude a 4–1 group stage comeback defeat of the United States in Maracaibo.

=== 2010 FIFA World Cup ===
During 2010 World Cup qualifying, Tevez was sent off twice in a three-game stretch, once against Colombia on 21 November 2007 after he kicked Rubén Darío Bustos in the 24th minute, and then on 9 September 2008 after a late tackle on Darío Verón which earned him a red card in the 31st minute of a 1–1 draw with Paraguay after he had been booked earlier. Tevez later apologised for the incident.

Tevez was again selected in the Argentina squad for the 2010 World Cup in South Africa. He scored twice in the tournament, both goals coming in the round of 16 match against Mexico. His first goal was a header scored in controversial style as he was in an offside position as Lionel Messi passed to him. However, the offside was missed by the referee's assistant and the goal was allowed to stand. Tevez scored his second goal of the game with a powerful shot from outside the box.

=== Later international career ===
At the 2011 Copa América, Tevez was the only player from either side to miss in the quarter-final penalty shoot-out against Uruguay, resulting in Argentina's elimination. After Alejandro Sabella's appointment as manager in July 2011, Tevez was not selected in an Argentina squad for three years, missing out as the team finished as runner-up at the 2014 World Cup.

On 27 October 2014, new manager Gerardo Martino recalled Tevez for friendly matches against Portugal and Croatia. He made his return to international football on 12 November 2014 at the Boleyn Ground, London, in a 2–1 win against Croatia.

In May 2015, Tevez was selected in Argentina's squad for the 2015 Copa América in Chile. On 26 June, he scored the winning kick in the 5–4 penalty shoot-out defeat of Colombia in the quarter-final, which allowed Argentina to advance to the semi-final. Argentina reached the final, only to be defeated by hosts Chile on penalties, as Tevez won his third runners-up medal in the tournament.

In May 2016, Tevez was omitted from Argentina's 23-man squad for the Copa América Centenario.

== Player profile ==
=== Style of play ===
Tevez was a quick, tenacious, powerful, hard-working, dynamic and versatile forward, with a sturdy physique. A technical, tactically intelligent, and creative player, with an eye for goal, Tevez was capable of playing as a striker, as a winger, or even as a supporting forward, or as an attacking midfielder, due his finishing and positioning, as well as his vision, creativity, movement and passing ability, which enabled him to exploit space and provide assists for teammates as well as score goals himself. He was also occasionally deployed as a false 9 throughout his career. Due to his pace, strength, work-rate and stamina, Tevez was also extremely useful when possession is lost, and he excelled at pressing opponents, aiding his team to win back the ball and start attacking plays, making him effective both defensively and offensively. Tevez was also a skillful dribbler, and he possessed an accurate and powerful shot from distance; he was also an accurate penalty kick and free-kick taker.

=== Goal celebrations ===
Tevez was known for his dancing goal celebrations ever since playing for Boca Juniors, as well with Corinthians of Brazil. During his time at Manchester United, he would hide a baby's dummy in his shorts and put it in his mouth after scoring a goal as a commemorative gesture to his baby daughter. After his move to Manchester City, Tevez often performed a dance where he puts his hands together, bends down and rocks his body; this dance has been named after him as the "Tevez Dance".

== Managerial career ==
=== Rosario Central ===
On 21 June 2022, shortly after announcing his retirement as a player, Tevez was appointed as head coach of Argentine Primera División side Rosario Central. After just five months in charge, he resigned at the end of the 2022 Argentine Primera División season, citing the club's upcoming directorial elections.

=== Independiente ===
In August 2023, Tevez became the manager of Independiente. On 9 December 2023, he extended his contract with Independiente until 31 December 2026.

On 17 May 2024, Tevez announced that he would leave Independiente after the subsequent match against Platense.

== Personal life ==
Tevez once performed as the front-man for his cumbia villera musical group Piola Vago alongside his brother Diego. The group's most successful hit, "Lose Your Control", charted in Argentina.

On 6 February 2009, Tevez was stopped by Greater Manchester Police near junction 7 of the M60 motorway. It was found Tevez was driving without a full UK driving licence and with illegally tinted windows. His car was then impounded by the police since he could not arrange for it to be removed himself.

In 2010, he was in an open relationship with 19-year-old actress Brenda Asnicar that lasted about a year.

Tevez, a keen golfer, caddied for his friend, and fellow Argentinian, Andrés Romero at the 2012 Open Championship.

On 22 December 2016, Tevez married 32-year-old Vanesa Mansilla in his homeland Argentina. They have two daughters together: Florencia and Katia.

In a 2023 interview, Tevez said that during his time in England he had refused to learn English as he had a "cultural problem with the English". This had happened as he blamed the English for the Falklands War in which his uncle had taken part and after which he had become an alcoholic.

== Career statistics ==
=== Club ===
Appearances and goals by club, season and competition
Club	Season	League			National cup (Note: Includes Copa do Brasil, FA Cup, Coppa Italia, Chinese FA Cup, Copa Argentina)		League cup (Note: Includes Football League Cup, Copa de la Superliga)		Continental		Other		Total	
Club	Season	Division	Apps	Goals	Apps	Goals	Apps	Goals	Apps	Goals	Apps	Goals	Apps	Goals
Boca Juniors	2001–02	Argentine Primera División	11	1	—		—		4 (Note: Appearances in Copa Libertadores)	1	—		15	2
Boca Juniors	2002–03	Argentine Primera División	32	11	—		—		9 (Note: One appearance in Copa Sudamericana, eight appearances and five goals in Copa Libertadores)	5	—		41	16
Boca Juniors	2003–04	Argentine Primera División	23	12	—		—		14 (Note: One appearance in Copa Sudamericana, thirteen appearances and three goals in Copa Libertadores)	3	1 (Note: Appearance in Intercontinental Cup)	0	38	15
Boca Juniors	2004–05	Argentine Primera División	9	2	—		–		6 (Note: Appearances in Copa Sudamericana)	2	1 (Note: Appearance in Recopa Sudamericana)	1	16	5
Boca Juniors	Total		75	26	—		—		33	11	2	1	110	38
Corinthians	2005	Série A	29	20	6	4	—		4	0	13 (Note: Appearances in Campeonato Paulista)	7	52	31
Corinthians	2006	Série A	9	5	0	0	—		8	4	7	6	24	15
Corinthians	Total		38	25	6	4	—		12	4	20	13	76	46
West Ham United	2006–07	Premier League	26	7	1	0	0	0	2 (Note: Appearances in UEFA Cup)	0	—		29	7
Manchester United (loan)	2007–08	Premier League	34	14	2	1	0	0	12 (Note: Appearance(s) in UEFA Champions League)	4	0	0	48	19
Manchester United (loan)	2008–09	Premier League	29	5	3	2	6	6	9	2	4 (Note: One appearance in FA Community Shield, one appearance in UEFA Super Cup, two appearances in FIFA Club World Cup)	0	51	15
Manchester United (loan)	Total		63	19	5	3	6	6	21	6	4	0	99	34
Manchester City	2009–10	Premier League	35	23	1	0	6	6	—		—		42	29
Manchester City	2010–11	Premier League	31	20	6	3	0	0	7 (Note: Appearances in UEFA Europa League)	0	—		44	23
Manchester City	2011–12	Premier League	13	4	0	0	1	0	1	0	0	0	15	4
Manchester City	2012–13	Premier League	34	11	6	5	1	0	5	0	1 (Note: Appearance in FA Community Shield)	1	47	17
Manchester City	Total		113	58	13	8	8	6	13	0	1	1	148	73
Juventus	2013–14	Serie A	34	19	1	0	—		12 (Note: Six appearances in UEFA Champions League, six appearances and one goal in UEFA Europa League)	1	1 (Note: Appearance in Supercoppa Italiana)	1	48	21
Juventus	2014–15	Serie A	32	20	1	0	—		13	7	1	2	47	29
Juventus	Total		66	39	2	0	—		25	8	2	3	95	50
Boca Juniors	2015	Argentine Primera División	12	5	5	4	—		—		—		17	9
Boca Juniors	2016	Argentine Primera División	11	4	4	2	—		12	5	1 (Note: Appearance in Supercopa Argentina)	0	28	11
Boca Juniors	2016–17	Argentine Primera División	11	5	—		—		—		—		11	5
Boca Juniors	Total		34	14	9	6	—		12	5	1	0	56	25
Shanghai Shenhua	2017	Chinese Super League	16	4	3	0	—		1 (Note: Appearance in AFC Champions League)	0	—		20	4
Boca Juniors	2017–18	Argentine Primera División	10	3	—		—		5	2	1	0	16	5
Boca Juniors	2018–19	Argentine Primera División	21	5	3	1	6	0	10	2	1	0	41	8
Boca Juniors	2019–20	Argentine Primera División	17	9	1	0	—		5	0	—		23	9
Boca Juniors	2020–21	Copa de la Liga Profesional	18	5	0	0	—		15	4	0	0	33	9
Boca Juniors	Total		66	22	4	1	6	0	35	8	2	0	113	31
Boca Juniors	Boca Juniors total		175	62	13	7	6	0	80	24	5	1	279	94
Career total			497	214	43	22	20	12	154	42	32	18	746	308

=== International ===
Appearances and goals by national team and year
National team	Year	Apps	Goals
Argentina	2004	10	2
Argentina	2005	9	0
Argentina	2006	8	2
Argentina	2007	13	3
Argentina	2008	4	0
Argentina	2009	8	1
Argentina	2010	8	4
Argentina	2011	4	1
Argentina	2012	0	0
Argentina	2013	0	0
Argentina	2014	2	0
Argentina	2015	10	0
Total		76	13

Scores and results list Argentina's goal tally first, score column indicates score after each Tevez goal.

List of international goals scored by Carlos Tevez
No.	Date	Venue	Opponent	Score	Result	Competition
1	17 July 2004	Estadio Elías Aguirre, Chiclayo, Peru	Peru	1–0	1–0	2004 Copa América
2	20 July 2004	Estadio Nacional de Lima, Lima, Peru	Colombia	1–0	3–0	2004 Copa América
3	1 March 2006	St. Jakob-Park, Basel, Switzerland	Croatia	1–1	2–3	Friendly
4	16 June 2006	Veltins-Arena, Gelsenkirchen, Germany	Serbia and Montenegro	5–0	6–0	2006 FIFA World Cup
5	2 June 2007	St. Jakob-Park, Basel, Switzerland	Switzerland	1–0	1–1	Friendly
6	5 June 2007	Camp Nou, Barcelona, Spain	Algeria	1–0	4–3	Friendly
7	28 June 2007	Estadio José Pachencho Romero, Maracaibo, Venezuela	United States	4–1	4–1	2007 Copa América
8	28 March 2009	Estadio Monumental Antonio Vespucio Liberti, Buenos Aires, Argentina	Venezuela	2–0	4–0	2010 FIFA World Cup qualification
9	24 May 2010	Estadio Monumental Antonio Vespucio Liberti, Buenos Aires, Argentina	Canada	4–0	5–0	Friendly
10	27 June 2010	FNB Stadium, Johannesburg, South Africa	Mexico	1–0	3–1	2010 FIFA World Cup
11	27 June 2010	FNB Stadium, Johannesburg, South Africa	Mexico	3–0	3–1	2010 FIFA World Cup
12	7 September 2010	Estadio Monumental Antonio Vespucio Liberti, Buenos Aires, Argentina	Spain	3–0	4–1	Friendly
13	20 June 2011	Estadio Monumental Antonio Vespucio Liberti, Buenos Aires, Argentina	Albania	4–0	4–0	Friendly

=== Managerial ===
As of 9 May 2026

Managerial record by team and tenure
Team	Nat	From	To	Record							
Team	Nat	From	To	G	W	D	L	GF	GA	GD	Win %
Rosario Central	(Argentina)	21 June 2022	3 November 2022	24	6	11	7	24	25	−1	25.00
Independiente	(Argentina)	22 August 2023	19 May 2024	32	14	12	6	36	24	+12	43.75
Talleres	(Argentina)	9 July 2025	13 May 2026	35	13	11	11	28	28	+0	37.14
Total				91	33	34	24	88	77	+11	36.26

== Honours ==
Boca Juniors

- Primera División: 2003 Apertura, 2015, 2016–17, 2017–18, 2019–20
- Copa Argentina: 2014–15
- Copa de la Liga Profesional: 2020
- Supercopa Argentina: 2018
- Copa Libertadores: 2003; runner-up: 2004
- Copa Sudamericana: 2004
- Intercontinental Cup: 2003

Corinthians

- Campeonato Brasileiro Série A: 2005

Manchester United

- Premier League: 2007–08, 2008–09
- Football League Cup: 2008–09
- FA Community Shield: 2008
- UEFA Champions League: 2007–08; runner-up: 2008–09
- FIFA Club World Cup: 2008

Manchester City

- Premier League: 2011–12
- FA Cup: 2010–11; runner-up: 2012–13
- FA Community Shield: 2012

Juventus

- Serie A: 2013–14, 2014–15
- Coppa Italia: 2014–15
- Supercoppa Italiana: 2013
- UEFA Champions League runner-up: 2014–15

Shanghai Shenhua

- Chinese FA Cup: 2017

Argentina U20

- South American U-20 Championship: 2003

Argentina Olympic

- Summer Olympics: 2004 Gold Medal
- CONMEBOL Pre-Olympic Tournament: 2004

Argentina

- Copa América runner-up: 2004, 2007, 2015
- FIFA Confederations Cup runner-up: 2005

Individual

- South American Footballer of the Year: 2003, 2004, 2005
- South American Team of the Year: 2003, 2004, 2005
- Copa Libertadores MVP Award: 2003
- Player of the Year of Argentina: 2003, 2004
- Argentine Sportsperson of the Year: 2004
- Summer Olympics Golden Boot: 2004
- Campeonato Brasileiro Série A Best Player: 2005
- Campeonato Brasileiro Série A Team of the Year: 2005
- Bola de Ouro: 2005
- Bola de Prata: 2005
- West Ham United Hammer of the Year: 2006–07
- Manchester City Official Supporter's Player of the Year: 2009–10
- Manchester City Player's Player of the Year: 2009–10
- Premier League Golden Boot: 2010–11
- PFA Team of the Year: 2010–11 Premier League
- Premier League Player of the Month: December 2009
- PFA Fans' Premier League Player of the Month: March 2010
- Guerin d'Oro: 2014, 2015
- Juventus Player of the Season: 2013–14, 2014–15
- Serie A Team of the Year: 2013–14, 2014–15
- UEFA Europa League Team of the Season: 2013–14
- Serie A Footballer of the Year: 2014–15
