= Jorge Martínez (footballer, born 1973) =

Argentine footballer

Personal information
- Full name: Jorge Daniel Martínez
- Date of birth: 20 June 1973 (age 53)
- Place of birth: Montecarlo, Argentina
- Height: 1.70 m (5 ft 7 in)
- Position: Defender

Senior career*
Years	Team	Apps	(Gls)
1993–1995	Deportivo Mandiyú	48	(1)
1995–1998	Independiente	81	(8)
1998–1999	River Plate	18	(0)
1999	Real Zaragoza	1	(0)
2000–2001	Independiente	46	(2)
2001–2002	Boca Juniors	19	(2)
2002–2004	Colón de Santa Fe	66	(4)
2004–2005	Independiente	34	(0)
2005–2006	Olimpo de Bahía Blanca	34	(0)
2006–2007	Nueva Chicago	34	(2)
2007–2010	Olimpo de Bahía Blanca	22	(0)
2010	Platense	15	(0)

International career
1997	Argentina	3	(0)
- * Club domestic league appearances and goals

Jorge Daniel Martínez (born 20 June 1973) is a former Argentine football defender.

Born in Montecarlo, Misiones, Martínez started his professional playing career in 1993 with Deportivo Mandiyú. In 1995, he joined Club Atlético Independiente where he played for three seasons. During this spell with Independiente, he was called up for the 1997 Copa América tournament. In 1998, he joined River Plate.

In 1999, Martinez went to Spain to play for Real Zaragoza but only made one league appearance before returning for a second spell with Independiente.

In 2001, he joined River Plate's fiercest rivals, Boca Juniors but only stayed with the club for one season. He then played for Colón de Santa Fe and a third spell with Independiente.

In 2005, Martinez joined Olimpo de Bahía Blanca but left the club for newly promoted Nueva Chicago when Olimpo suffered relegation. The following season Nueva Chicago were relegated and Martínez returned to Olimpo in the 2nd division.
