= Matías Arce =

Argentine footballer (born 1980)

Matías Sebastián Arce (born 31 January 1980) is an Argentine former footballer who is last known to have played as a midfielder for San Miguel.

== Career ==
Arce started his career with Argentine side Boca.

== Style of play ==
Arce mainly operated as an offensive midfielder.
