= Juan Forchetti =

Argentine footballer

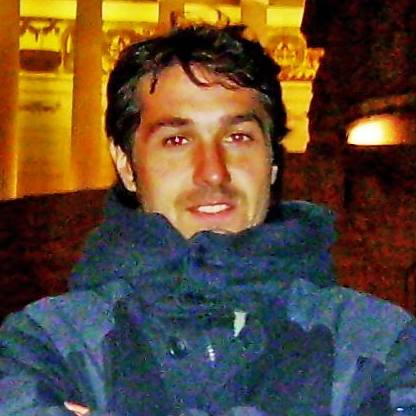
- Forchetti in 2018.

Personal information
- Full name: Gustavo Juan Forchetti
- Date of birth: 1 April 1981 (age 45)
- Place of birth: Tres Arroyos, Argentina
- Position: Defender

Team information
- Current team: Egaleo

Youth career
- 2001–2003: Boca Juniors

Senior career*
Years	Team	Apps	(Gls)
2003	Boca Juniors	0	(0)
2003	→ MetroStars (loan)	10	(0)
2004–2005	Chacarita Juniors		
2005–2006	CD Santamarina	9	(0)
2007–	Egaleo		
- * Club domestic league appearances and goals

Gustavo Juan Forchetti (born 1 April 1981) is an Argentine footballer who plays in Greece for Egaleo. He began his career at Boca Juniors, before spending the 2003 season on loan at Major League Soccer club MetroStars. He later played for CD Santamarina.
