= Nahuel Fioretto =

Argentine footballer (born 1981)

Personal information
- Full name: Nahuel Darío Fioretto
- Date of birth: 25 January 1981 (age 45)
- Place of birth: San Martín, Argentina
- Height: 1.78 m (5 ft 10 in)
- Position: Midfielder

Youth career
- –2001: Boca Juniors

Senior career*
Years	Team	Apps	(Gls)
2001–2002	Boca Juniors	4	(0)
2002–2003	Nueva Chicago	10	(0)
2003–2004	Ferro Carril Oeste	29	(3)
2004–2005	Huracán	29	(10)
2005	Lanús	11	(1)
2006	Olimpo	0	(0)
2006–2007	Instituto	24	(3)
2007	Independiente Rivadavia	10	(0)
2008	Bolívar	16	(1)
2009–2010	Táchira	15	(2)
2010	Unterhaching	3	(0)
2011	Unión de Santa Fe	17	(1)
2011–2012	Boca Unidos	12	(1)
2012–2015	Defensores de Belgrano	77	(9)
2016	Cobreloa	9	(0)
2016–2017	Riestra	6	(0)
2017	Talleres (RE)	9	(0)
2017–2018	Laferrere	20	(1)
- * Club domestic league appearances and goals

Nahuel Darío Fioretto (born 25 January 1981) is an Argentine footballer who played as a midfielder.
