= César La Paglia =

Argentine footballer

Cesar La Paglia
Personal information
- Full name: Cesar Osvaldo La Paglia
- Date of birth: February 25, 1979 (age 47)
- Place of birth: Buenos Aires, Argentina
- Height: 1.75 m (5 ft 9 in)
- Position: Midfielder

Youth career
- Argentinos Juniors

Senior career*
| Years | Team | Apps | (Gls) |
| 1996 | Argentinos Juniors | 3 | (0) |
| 1997–2001 | Boca Juniors | 38 | (3) |
| 2001–2003 | Talleres de Córdoba | 47 | (11) |
| 2003 | Boca Juniors | 1 | (0) |
| 2004–2006 | CD Tenerife | 59 | (3) |
| 2006–2007 | Vitória F.C. | 5 | (0) |
| 2007 | Wuhan Guanggu | 0 | (0) |
| 2008 | Independiente Medellín | 8 | (0) |
| 2008 | Defensor Sporting | 8 | (0) |
| 2009 | San Martín de Tucumán | 7 | (0) |
- * Club domestic league appearances and goals

Cesar Osvaldo La Paglia (born 25 February 1979 in Buenos Aires) is an Argentine football midfielder.

La Paglia started his career at Argentinos Juniors but he was soon sold to Argentine team Boca Juniors. In his first spell with Boca he was part of three League titles. In 2001, he moved to Talleres de Córdoba but in 2003 he returned to Boca for a second spell with the club. It was during this brief spell at Boca that he won the Copa Libertadores.

Between 2004 and 2006 he played for Spanish side CD Tenerife, in 2006 he moved to Vitória F.C. and in 2007 he moved to Independiente Medellín. During the transfer window in January, the Chinese club of Wuhan Guanggu signed him for a one-year contract. On May 11, 2008, he was released from Wuhan Guanggu and spent the second half of 2008 with Defensor Sporting of Uruguay.

In 2009 La Paglia returned to Argentina to join San Martín de Tucumán.

== Titles ==
| Season | Club | Titles |
|---|---|---|
| 1998 Apertura | Boca Juniors | Primera Division Argentina |
| 1999 Clausura | Boca Juniors | Primera Division Argentina |
| 2000 Apertura | Boca Juniors | Primera Division Argentina |
| 2003 Apertura | Boca Juniors | Primera Division Argentina |
| 2000 | Boca Juniors | Copa Libertadores |
