= Christian Traverso =

Argentine footballer

Personal information
- Full name: Christian Alberto Traverso
- Date of birth: 19 August 1971 (age 55)
- Place of birth: Buenos Aires, Argentina
- Position: Goalkeeper

Senior career*
Years	Team	Apps	(Gls)
1989–1990	Deportivo Riestra		
1991–1994	Defensores de Belgrano		
1995–1996	Barracas Central		
1996	Deportes Linares	29	(0)
1997–2003	Deportes Antofagasta		
2004–2006	Deportes Melipilla	63	(2)
2007–2008	San Luis	83	(0)
2009	Sacachispas	18	(0)
- * Club domestic league appearances and goals

Christian Alberto Traverso (born 19 August 1971) is an Argentine former professional footballer who played as a goalkeeper for clubs of Argentina and Chile.

== Career ==
- Deportivo Riestra 1989–1990
- Defensores de Belgrano 1991–1994
- Barracas Central 1995–1996
- Deportes Linares 1996
- Deportes Antofagasta 1997–2003
- Deportes Melipilla 2004–2006
- San Luis Quillota 2007–2008
- Sacachispas 2009

== Post-retirement ==
Settled in Melipilla, Chile, Traverso has served as a padel coach and director of Colo-Colo Melipilla Academy.

== Honours ==
Deportes Melipilla

- Primera B (2): 2004, 2006
