= Ariel Carreño =

Argentine footballer

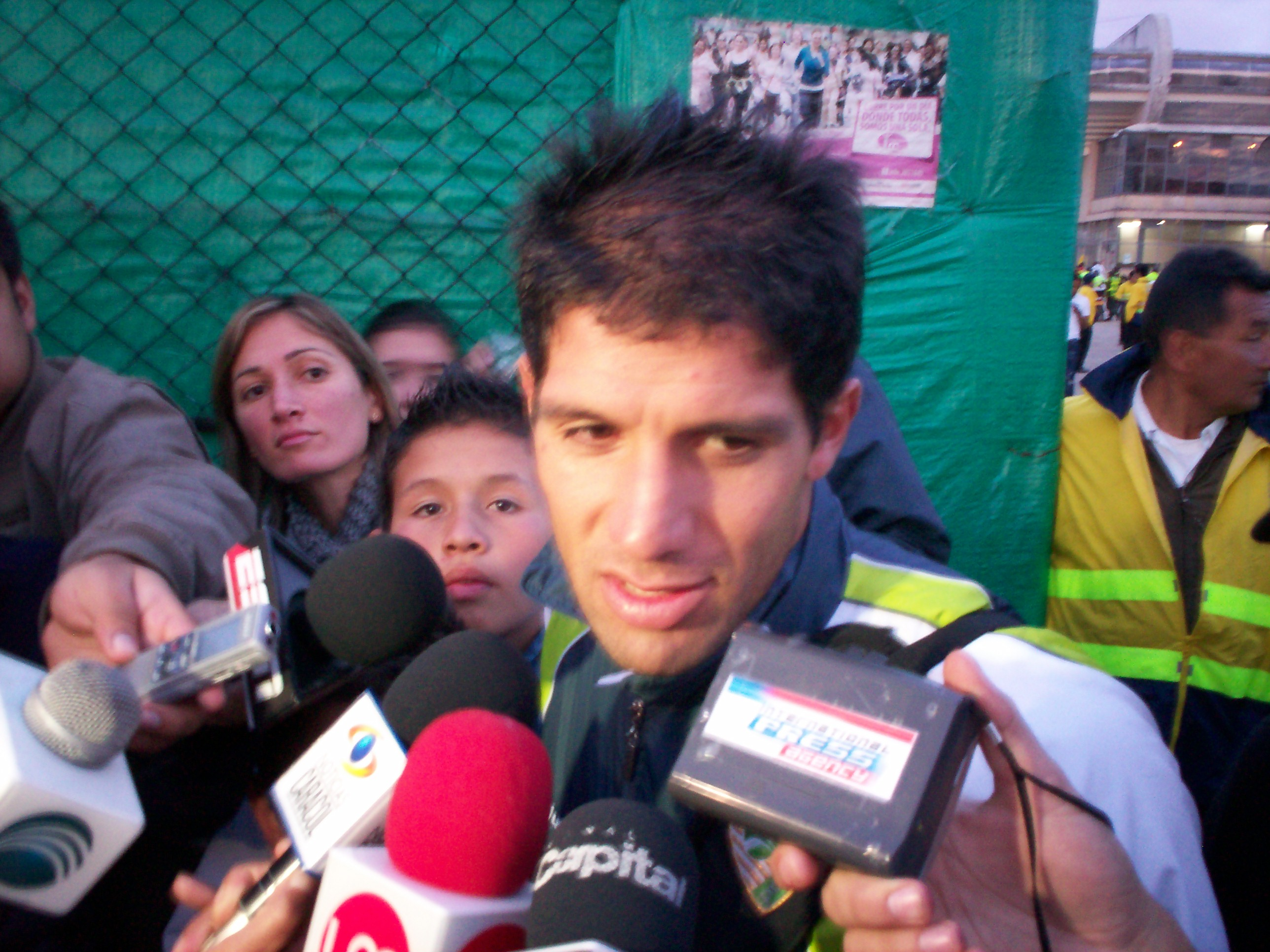
- Argentine footballer, Ariel Carreño.

Personal information
- Full name: Ariel Sebastian Carreño
- Date of birth: March 4, 1979 (age 47)
- Place of birth: Córdoba, Argentina
- Height: 1.78 m (5 ft 10 in)
- Position: Striker

Team information
- Current team: San Miguel

Youth career
- Boca Juniors

Senior career*
Years	Team	Apps	(Gls)
1998–1999 Boca Juniors	Boca Juniors		
1999- Siena	Siena		
- * Club domestic league appearances and goals

Ariel Carreño (born 4 March 1979 in Córdoba) is an Argentine former footballer who played as a striker, last for San Miguel.

Carreño is a product of the Boca Juniors youth system, he made his debut for the first team in 1998, he played a total of 44 games for the club in all competitions, scoring 8 goals. He helped Boca to win the Apertura 1998 and the Copa Sudamericana 2004.

Carreño had a spell in Mexico with Puebla F.C. and a season in Switzerland with FC Thun. He has also played for a number of Argentine clubs including Chacarita Juniors, Nueva Chicago, San Lorenzo, Club Atlético Lanús, Tiro Federal and San Martín (SJ).

== Titles ==
Season	Team	Title
Apertura 1998	Boca Juniors	Primera División Argentina
2004	Boca Juniors	Copa Sudamericana
