= Julio Marchant =

Argentine footballer (born 1980)

Personal information
- Full name: Julio Javier Marchant
- Date of birth: 11 January 1980 (age 46)
- Place of birth: Santiago del Estero, Argentina
- Height: 1.74 m (5 ft 8 1/2 in)
- Position: Right midfielder

Team information
- Current team: Juventud Antoniana

Youth career
- Boca Juniors

Senior career*
Years	Team	Apps	(Gls)
1998–2002	Boca Juniors	43	(1)
2002–2003	Racing Club	6	(0)
2003–2004	Unión	12	(2)
2004–2006	Nacional	89	(12)
2007	Necaxa	0	(0)
2007–2009	Defensor Sporting	90	(1)
2009–2010	→ Banfield (loan)	26	(0)
2010	América de Cali	18	(1)
2011–2012	Chacarita Juniors	25	(0)
2012–2015	CA Mitre		
2015	Juventud Antoniana	18	(0)
2017	Vélez de San Ramón	17	(0)
- * Club domestic league appearances and goals

Julio Javier Marchant (born 11 January 1980 in Santiago del Estero) is an Argentine retired footballer.

== Career ==
He made his debut playing for Boca Juniors in 2000, where he won the Copa Libertadores 2000. Two years later, he lost his place in the squad, transferring to Racing Club the next year.

After his spell in Racing, Marchant was transferred once again to Union de Santa Fé, playing in the Nacional B, second division of Argentine football. He then moved to Portugal, playing 2 years for CD Nacional.

The first half of 2007 saw the midfielder transferring to Mexican side Necaxa, which signed him to play for the team in the 2007 Copa Libertadores.

He then made a move to Uruguay to play for Defensor Sporting in the second half of 2007. With Defensor Sporting he won the 2008 Uruguayan Championship.

In 2009, he returned to Argentina to play for Banfield where he was a key member of the squad that won the Apertura 2009 championship appearing in 17 of their 19 games. On 13 December 2009 he celebrated with his teammates when Banfield won the Argentine championship for the first time in the history of the club.

== Honours ==
Boca Juniors

- Primera División Argentina: Apertura 2000
- Copa Libertadores (2): 2000, 2001
- Copa Intercontinental: 2000

Defensor Sporting Club

- Primera División Uruguaya: 2008

Banfield

- Primera División Argentina: Apertura 2009
