= Mauricio Serna =

Colombian footballer (born 1968)

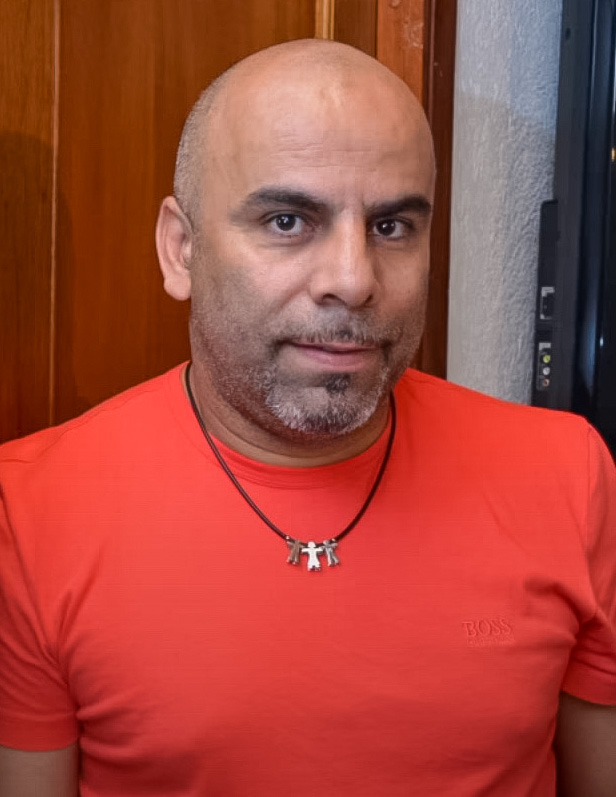

Personal information
- Full name: Mauricio Alberto Serna Valencia
- Date of birth: 22 January 1968 (age 58)
- Place of birth: Medellín, Colombia
- Height: 1.66 m (5 ft 5 in)
- Position: Midfielder

Team information
- Current team: Boca Juniors II (interim manager)

Senior career*
Years	Team	Apps	(Gls)
1990	Deportivo Pereira	39	(5)
1991–1997	Atlético Nacional		
1997–2002	Boca Juniors	91	(2)
2002–2003	Puebla	96	(0)
2004	Chacarita Juniors	10	(0)
2004	Talleres de Córdoba	18	(0)
2005	Atlético Nacional		

International career
1993–2001	Colombia	51	(2)

Managerial career
- 2021–: Boca Juniors II (interim)
- * Club domestic league appearances and goals

Mauricio Alberto "Chicho" Serna Valencia (born 22 January 1968) is a Colombian former professional footballer who played as a midfielder.

Serna played for a number of clubs, including Deportivo Pereira, Atlético Nacional, Boca Juniors (Argentina), Puebla F.C. (Mexico), Chacarita Juniors (Argentina) and Talleres Córdoba (Argentina). He also appeared 51 times for the Colombia national team between 1993 and 2001.

== Career ==
Serna was born in Medellín. At Boca, he played 96 league games, amounting to a total of 123 in all competitions, and also served as captain.

Serna played for the Colombia national team and was a participant at the 1994 and 1998 FIFA World Cups.

== After retirement ==
In February 2021, Serna accepted a position at Boca's youth department.

On 17 August 2021, Boca's reserve team manager, Sebastián Battaglia, was appointed first team manager on interim basis, while Serna and Hugo Ibarra took charge of the reserve team, also on interim basis.

== Personal life ==
On 5 May 2015, he was publicly accused on the Séptimo día television program in his native Colombia of defrauding an innumerable number of young soccer players with the promise that they had been signed by Argentine clubs, making them travel to the country asking them in advance a commission for the supposed signings.

On 5 June 2018, a court in Buenos Aires linked him to the crimes of drug trafficking and money laundering in Argentina for a figure close to three million dollars. In 2019, he was again accused before a United States court by the drug trafficker José Bayron Piedrahíta (better known by his aliases of "El Árabe" or "El Patrón de Caucasia") of having committed the crime of money laundering together with Pablo Escobar's widow and son through real estate deals in Argentina and Panama.

== Honours ==
Atlético Nacional

- Categoría Primera A: 1994

Boca Juniors

- Argentine Primera División: Apertura 1998, Clausura 1999, Apertura 2000
- Copa Libertadores: 2000, 2001
- Copa Intercontinental: 2000
