= Antonio Barijho =

Argentine footballer (born 1977)

Personal information
- Full name: Antonio Daniel Barijho
- Date of birth: March 18, 1977 (age 49)
- Place of birth: Buenos Aires, Argentina
- Height: 1.82 m (6 ft 0 in)
- Position: Striker

Team information
- Current team: Boca Juniors (youth coach)

Senior career*
Years	Team	Apps	(Gls)
1993–1998	Huracán	65	(12)
1998–2002	Boca Juniors	60	(22)
2002–2003	Grasshopper	22	(12)
2003–2004	Boca Juniors	4	(1)
2004	Saturn Moscow	6	(1)
2005	Banfield	5	(1)
2005	Barcelona SC	12	(3)
2006	Banfield	9	(2)
2006	Independiente	2	(0)
2007–2008	Huracán	27	(4)
2009	Deportivo Merlo	3	(0)

Managerial career
- 2013–2014: Peñarol Argentino (youth)
- 2015–2018: Huracán (youth)
- 2019–: Boca Juniors (youth)
- * Club domestic league appearances and goals

Antonio Daniel Barijho (born 18 March 1977 in Buenos Aires) is a former Argentine football striker.

== Club career ==
Barijho started his career with Huracán in 1992, he left the club in 1998 and returned in 2007.

The most successful part of his career was his first spell with Boca Juniors between 1998 and 2002 where he won six major titles, including two Copa Libertadores and three Primera División Argentina titles.

In 2002, he moved to Switzerland to play for Grasshopper Club Zürich in Switzerland where he was part of the 2002-2003 Swiss Super League winning squad. At the end of the season he returned to Boca and won one further league title. he played a total of 102 games for Boca in all competitions scoring 45 goals.

Nicknamed "Chipi", Barijho has also played football for Banfield and Independiente in Argentina, FC Saturn Moscow Oblast in Russia and Barcelona SC in Ecuador.

After one year of retirement, Barijho accepted a deal to play with recently promoted Deportivo Merlo at the Primera B Nacional.

== Coaching career ==
After his retirement, Barijho started his coaching career as a youth coach at Club Peñarol Argentino in Bajo Flores, near to where he lived with his family. At the end of 2014 it was confirmed, that

In February 2019, he was hired as a youth coach at Boca Juniors.

== Honours ==
Boca Juniors

- Primera División: 1998 Apertura, 1999 Clausura, 2000 Apertura, 2003 Apertura
- Copa Libertadores: 2000, 2001
- Intercontinental Cup: 2000, 2003

Grasshopper

- Swiss Super League: 2002–03
