= José María Calvo =

Argentine footballer

Personal information
- Full name: José María Calvo
- Date of birth: 15 July 1981 (age 45)
- Place of birth: Quenumá, Argentina
- Height: 1.73 m (5 ft 8 in)
- Position: Full back

Youth career
- Boca Juniors

Senior career*
Years	Team	Apps	(Gls)
2000–2011	Boca Juniors	167	(5)
2007	→ Gimnàstic (loan)	19	(0)
2007–2008	→ Recreativo (loan)	14	(0)
- * Club domestic league appearances and goals

José María Calvo (born 15 July 1981 in Quenumá, Buenos Aires), also known as Pampa Calvo, is an Argentine former professional footballer. He has played for Boca Juniors and had loan spells in Spain for Gimnàstic and Recreativo.

== Achievements ==
=== Club ===
Boca Juniors

- Primera División: 2000 Apertura, 2003 Apertura, 2005 Apertura, 2006 Clausura, 2008 Apertura
- Copa Libertadores: 2001, 2003
- Copa Intercontinental: 2003
- Copa Sudamericana: 2004, 2005
- Recopa Sudamericana: 2005, 2006
