= Gustavo Pinto =

Argentine footballer

Personal information
- Full name: Gustavo Hernán Pinto
- Date of birth: 29 May 1979 (age 47)
- Place of birth: Ciudadela, Buenos Aires, Argentina
- Height: 1.80 m (5 ft 11 in)
- Position: Midfielder

Senior career*
Years	Team	Apps	(Gls)
2000–2003	Boca Juniors	29	(1)
2003	Torpedo-Metallurg	9	(0)
2004	FK Moskva	1	(0)
2005	Emelec	30	(3)
2006	Olimpo	16	(0)
2006–2007	Godoy Cruz	34	(1)
2007–2008	Olimpo	32	(3)
2008	Newell's Old Boys	0	(0)

Managerial career
- 2015–2020: Boca Juniors (youth)
- 2021: Cancún
- * Club domestic league appearances and goals

Gustavo Hernán Pinto (born 29 May 1979 in Ciudadela, Buenos Aires) is a former Argentine footballer and current manager.

== Career ==
Born in Buenos Aires Province, Pinto began playing professional football as a midfielder with Club Atlético Boca Juniors. During his time at Boca Juniors, the club won the 2001 Copa Libertadores.

He has played for a number of clubs in Argentina and has also played in Russia with Torpedo-Metallurg and FC Moscow and in Ecuador with Emelec.

== Coaching career ==
Pinto worked as a youth coach at Boca Juniors for five years, before leaving his position in the beginning of 2021, to join Mexican club Cancún, where he was appointed manager. He left the position in June 2021.
