= Cristian Traverso =

Argentine footballer

Personal information
- Full name: Cristian Alberto Traverso
- Date of birth: 17 April 1972 (age 54)
- Place of birth: San Martín, Argentina
- Height: 1.82 m (6 ft 0 in)
- Position: Defender

Youth career
- Argentinos Juniors

Senior career*
Years	Team	Apps	(Gls)
1990–1994	Argentinos Juniors	107	(0)
1995–1996	Universidad de Chile	44	(2)
1997–2002	Boca Juniors	119	(1)
2002–2003	Querétaro	36	(0)
2003–2004	Puebla	31	(0)
2004–2005	Boca Juniors	19	(0)
Total		356	(3)
- * Club domestic league appearances and goals

Cristian Alberto Traverso (born 17 April 1972 in San Martín, Buenos Aires Province) is an Argentine former professional footballer who played as a defender for a number of clubs both in Argentina and Latin America, including Argentinos Juniors, Boca Juniors and Puebla.

Nicknamed "Tigre" Traverso was named the Chilean Footballer of the Year in 1995 while playing for Universidad de Chile, though despite this honour he never played for his country.

== Post-retirement ==
Traverso has developed a career as a football commentator for media like TyC Sports. In October 2026, he assumed as president of Portuguese club Brito SC.

== Honours ==
Universidad de Chile

- Primera División de Chile: 1995

Boca Juniors

- Primera División Argentina: 1998 Apertura, 1999 Clausura, 2000 Apertura
- Copa Libertadores: 2000, 2001
- Copa Intercontinental: 2000
- Copa Sudamericana: 2004
