= Lüder (disambiguation) =

Lüder is a municipality in Lower Saxony, Germany.

Luder or Lüder may also refer to:

== People ==
=== Surname ===
- Hans Luder, father of the theologian Martin Luther
- Hans Luder, coach of FC Thun 1945-1948
- Ian Luder (born 1951), Lord Mayor of London from 2008 to 2009
- Ítalo Argentino Luder (1916–2008), Argentine politician
- Ludwig von Lüder (1795–1862), Bavarian major general and Minister of War of Bavaria
- Martin Luther (Martin Luder) (1483–1546), German priest and theologian, central figure in the Protestant Reformation
- Owen Luder (1928–2021), English architect
- Peter Luder (1415–1472), German professor of Latin and humanist
- Rudolf Luder (1846–1930), Swiss-Argentine teacher and choral director
- Simone Niggli-Luder (born 1978), née Luder, Swiss orienteering athlete
- Stefan Luder (born 1967), Swiss former curler
- Wolfgang Lüder (1937–2013), German lawyer and politician

=== Given name ===
- Lüder Arenhold (1854–1915), German marine painter
- Lüder Deecke (born 1938), German Austrian neurologist, neuroscientist, teacher and physician

=== Stage name ===
- Leonie Luder, a stage name of Leonie Saint (b. 1986), German actress and TV presenter

== Other uses ==
- Lüder (river), Hesse, Germany, tributary of the Fulda

== See also ==
- Lueders, a surname
