= Larreta =

Larreta is a surname. Notable people with the surname include:

- Alberto Rodríguez Larreta (1934–1977), Argentine racing driver
- Antonio Larreta (1922–2015), Uruguayan writer
- Eduardo Rodríguez Larreta (1888–1973), foreign minister of Uruguay
- Enrique Larreta (1875–1961), Argentine art collector
  - Also the Museo de Arte Español Enrique Larreta, named after him
- Horacio Rodríguez Larreta (born 1965), Argentine politician
