= Mercedes Castellanos de Anchorena =

Argentine philanthropist and papal marchioness

- Marquesa Pontificia
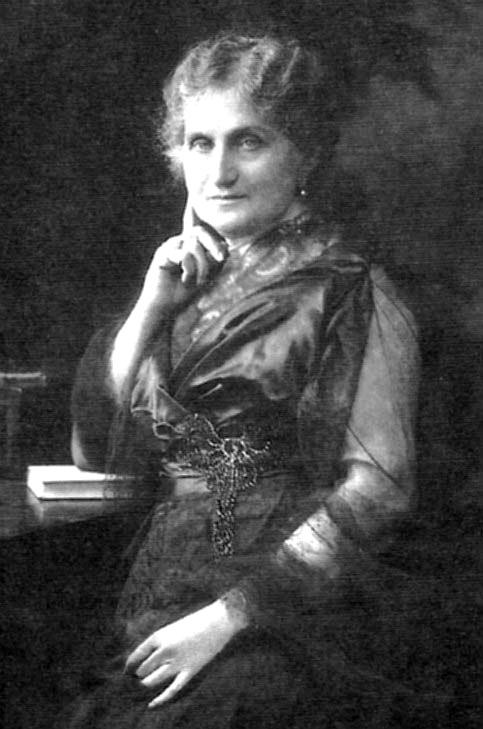
- Born: María Luisa de las Mercedes Castellanos de la Iglesia; 24 September 1840; Rosario, Santa Fe; Argentina
- Died: 9 July 1920 (aged 79); Buenos Aires, Argentina
- Noble family: Anchorena (by marriage)
- Spouse: Nicolás Hugo Anchorena Arana (m. 1864; died 1884)
- Issue: Aarón Félix Anchorena Castellanos
- Father: Aarón Castellanos
- Mother: Secundina de la Iglesia Castro
- Occupation: Philanthropist

Mercedes Castellanos de Anchorena, Marquesa de La Iglesia Católica (born María Luisa de las Mercedes Castellanos de la Iglesia; 24 September 1840 - 9 July 1920) was an Argentine aristocrat and philanthropist. She commissioned the San Martín Palace and funded the construction of the Basilica of the Holy Sacrament, the Monastery of Saint Teresa of Jesus, and the Cathedral of Salta. Castellanos de Anchorena, dedicated to Catholic causes, also gave scholarships to students at the Pontifical Latin American College in Rome. She was ennobled by Pope Pius XI and awarded the Pontifical Golden Rose, becoming the first Argentine to be made a papal marchioness.

== Early life and family ==
Castellanos de Anchorena was born on 24 September 1840 in Rosario, Santa Fe, to Aarón Castellanos, a military leader and businessman, and Secundina de la Iglesia Castro. She was baptized in a Catholic ceremony on 27 October 1840 at the Basilica of Our Lady of Mercy.

== Philanthropy ==
Castellanos de Anchorena was dedicated to Catholic charity, and funded many projects for the Catholic Church in Argentina. She commissioned the construction of the Basilica of the Holy Sacrament, the Monastery of Saint Teresa of Jesus, and the Cathedral of Salta. She also helped fund and donate land for the construction of Catholic schools for girls in Argentina. Castellanos de Anchorena also gave scholarships to students at the Pontifical Latin American College in Rome.

In 1903 she founded the town Aarón Castellanos, Santa Fe, which she named after her father. She funded the construction of a Franciscan convent and hospital in the municipality.

Her dedication to Catholic charities lead to her being ennobled as a papal marchioness by Pope Pius XI, who also awarded her a Pontifical Golden Rose.

== Personal life ==
She married Nicolás Hugo Anchorena Arana, the son of Nicolás Anchorena and a member of the landowning Anchorena family, in a Catholic ceremony at the Basilica of Our Lady of Help (Basílica Nuestra Señora del Socorro) in Buenos Aires on 24 September 1864. They had ten children:

- Nicolás María Serviliano Castellanos Anchorena (April 20, 1866 - November 2, 1889)
- Mercedes Benita Castellanos Anchorena (March 4, 1869 - April 28, 1869)
- Mercedes Dionisia Castellanos Anchorena (June 5, 1871 - December 19, 1890)
- Amalia Valentina Castellanos Anchorena (February 14, 1872 - March 16, 1907)
- Aarón Castellanos Anchorena (June 6, 1873 - June 6, 1873)
- Matilde Lidia Castellanos Anchorena (September 11, 1875 - June 25, 1969)
- Josefina Anacleta Castellanos Anchorena (July 13, 1876 - date unknown)
- Aarón Félix Anchorena Castellanos (November 5, 1877, Buenos Aires, Argentina - February 24, 1965, Barra de San Juan, Uruguay)
- Enrique Justino Pascual Castellanos Anchorena (April 13, 1879 - February 11, 1951)
- Emilio Evaristo Castellanos Anchorena (November 11, 1880 - December 17, 1916).

Her husband died in 1884, leaving Castellanos de Anchorena with a vast fortune. In 1894 she purchased an Italianate mansion in Belgrano and gave it to her daughter, Josefina, as a wedding gift in 1903 when she married Enrique Larreta. The house later became the Museo de Arte Español Enrique Larreta. In 1905 she commissioned the architect Alejandro Christophersen to build San Martín Palace as her private residence. After her death, it was acquired by the Argentine government and used as the headquarters of the Ministry of Foreign Affairs and Worship.

She died on 9 July 1920 and is buried at the Basilica of the Holy Sacrament.
