= Jorge Fernández-Trevejo Rivas =

Cuban artist (born 1949)

- Born: 6 August 1949 (age 76); Havana, Cuba
- Known for: Painter; caricaturist

Jorge Fernández-Trevejo Rivas (born 6 August 1949) is a Cuban artist, painter, and caricaturist. He currently resides in Argentina.

== Career ==
Fernández-Trevejo began studying painting at the Workshop of Fine Arts of San Jose de las Lajas. In 1967, while completing his compulsory military service in the FAR, he attended workshops in the plastic arts.

In 1971, Fernández-Trevejo went to work as a graphic designer in the magazine Verde Olivo, where he worked until 1980. His admiration and knowledge of the American writer Ernest Hemingway led him to create a set of memorable cartoons, later published in a book, which have become widely popular.

Throughout his career Fernández-Trevejo has worked in different disciplines, such as sculpture, graphic design, painting, cartoons, and digital arts, He has won many awards and prizes, not only in Cuba but internationally. He frequently participates in personal and collective exhibitions.

== Personal life ==
Fernández-Trevejo has been married three times and had two sons. His first son Ariel died in 2012 at age 34. His second son Jorge Cristobal, from his second marriage, is also a painter.

Since 1992, he has lived in Argentina, where he continues to work on his art.

== Awards and prizes ==
- 1968 - Second Prize in woodcutting - Talleres de Artes Plásticas de La Habana, Havana, Cuba
- 1969 - Mention in Engraving - "26 de Julio" Competition, Cuba
- 1969 - Second Prize in Engraving - 5th anniversary of the FAR Union, Cuba
- 1976 - Third Prize in Posters - National Transit Competition, Cuba
- 1978 - First Prize in Posters - National Transit Competition, Cuba
- 1979 - First Prize in Drawing - FAR Union, Cuba
- 2005 - Award in Caricature - The 11th International Cartoon Contest, Israel

== Expositions ==
Individual

- 1988 – Cabezas. Esculturas en madera. Galeria Boffil. Santiago de Cuba. (During the Festival Internacional de Arte Caribeño).
- 1989 – Galería Provincial de Pinar del Río. Carricature works on the 90th anniversary of the birth of Ernest Hemingway.
- 1992 – Centro Cultural Recoleta. Buenos Aires, Argentina. Examples of caricatures of Ernest Hemingway and wood sculptures.
- 1994 – Museo y Archivo Dardo Rocha, La Plata, Argentina. Carricature exposition on the 95th anniversary of the birth of Ernest Hemingway.
- 1997 – Museo de Bellas Artes de Luján, Buenos Aires, Argentina. Examples of caricatures of Ernest Hemingway
- 1998 – Municipalidad de La Plata. La Plata, Provincia de Buenos Aires, Argentina. Paintings.

Collective

- La Feria de ArteBA, 1997 and 2000.

Institutions showing some of his work

- 1988 – Caricaturas de Ernest Hemingway. Casa-Museo Ernest Hemingway, San Francisco de Paula, Havana, Cuba.
- 1989 – Escultura en Museo de la Kon Tiki, Noruega.
- 1991 – Caricaturas de Ernest Hemingway, Museo del Humor. San Antonio de los Baños, Havana, Cuba.
- 1993 – Donación de Escultura al Fondo Nacional de las Artes. Buenos Aires, Argentina.
- 1994 – Caricatura de Dardo Rocha, Museo y Archivo Dardo Rocha. La Plata, Argentina.
- 2009 – Caricatura de Albert Einstein, Museo del Humor de San Antonio de los Baños, Havana, Cuba.
