= Rudolf Luder =

Swiss-Argentine teacher and choral director

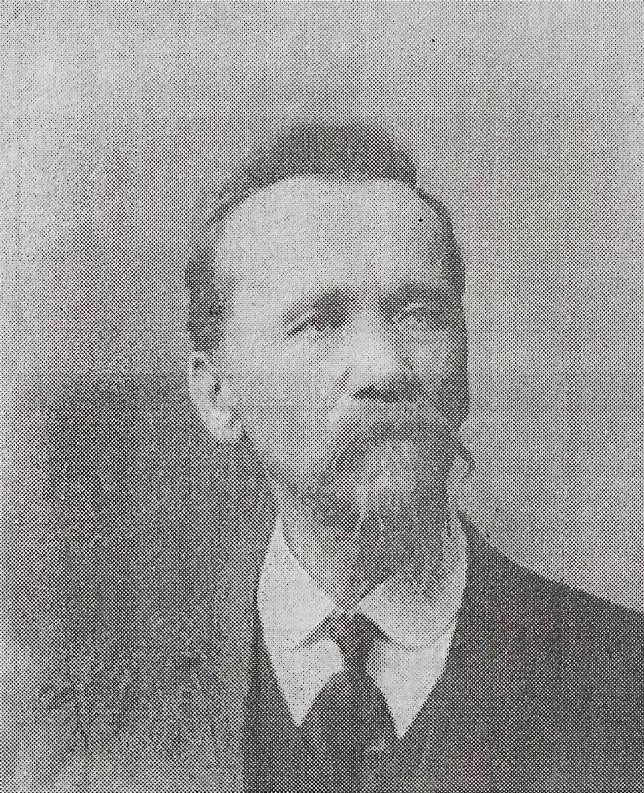
- Born: March 6, 1846; Büren zum Hof, Bern, Switzerland
- Died: June 30, 1930 (aged 84); Esperanza, Santa Fe, Argentina
- Other names: Rodolfo Luder (in spanish)
- Spouse: María Insinger
- Family: Ítalo Luder (grandson); Fernando Paillet (nephew in law)

Rudolf Luder (March 6, 1846, Büren Zum Hof, Bern, Switzerland – June 30, 1930, Esperanza, Santa Fe, Argentina) was a Swiss-Argentine teacher and choral director. He was recognized for his role in promoting choral singing in Argentina and for his teaching work in several Swiss and German immigrant colonies in the country. His contributions significantly helped preserve the cultural traditions of these communities during the 19th and early 20th centuries.

Rudolf Luder was born in Büren Zum Hof, Canton of Bern, Switzerland, in 1846, son of Daniel Luder and Elizabeth Lehner. He migrated to Argentina in 1869 and settled in the city of Esperanza, in the province of Santa Fe, one of the first agricultural colonies in the country. In 1875 he married María Insinger, with whom he had ten children. María was the granddaughter of Peter Zimmermann, the first settler to die in Esperanza.

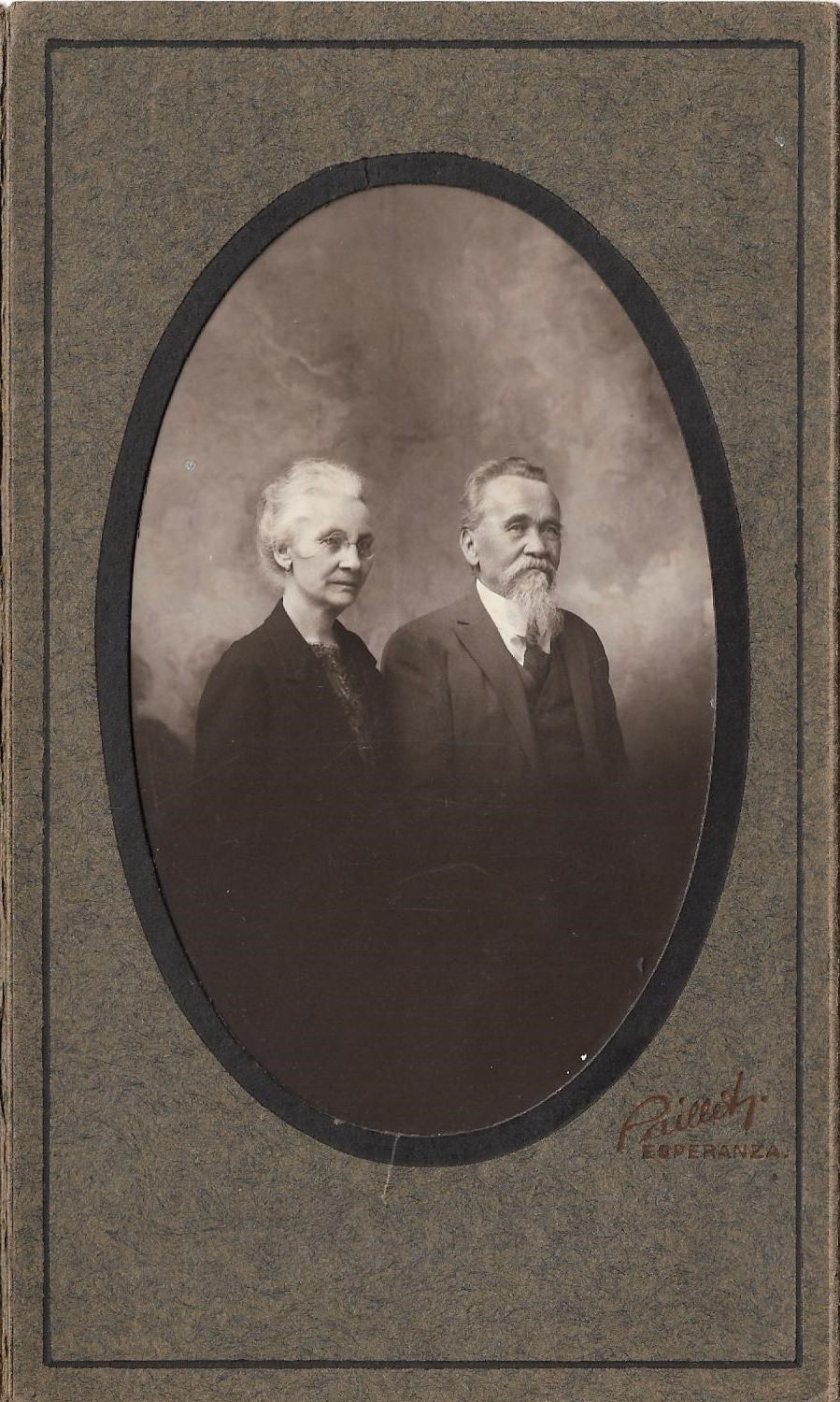
Golden wedding of Rudolf Luder and María Insinger. May 1925.

== Contribution to choral development in Argentina ==
In 1870, Rudolf Luder became the first conductor of the Männer Gesangverein choir, founded in Esperanza by German immigrants. This choir, one of the oldest in Latin America, played a central role in the cultural life of the community, promoting choral singing as an artistic expression and as a means of social cohesion. During his leadership, Luder helped consolidate the choral tradition in the region, leaving a legacy that continues to thrive today.

== Teaching career and contributions to other colonies ==
Rudolf Luder worked as a teacher for more than five decades, teaching in German, French and Spanish. He taught in several agricultural colonies, most notably at the German School of San Carlos (1873–1874), where he founded a choral society that eventually became the Harmonie Gesangverein Singing Society. He also taught at Isla Verde, at the school known as German School Artagaveytia, and contributed to the formation of choral groups in communities such as San Jerónimo Norte, Humboldt, and Baradero.

== Tributes and recognitions ==
2002: The Rudolf Luder Musical Esplanade was inaugurated in the Esperanza Agricultural National Park, a space dedicated to his cultural legacy.

2020: During the commemoration of the 150th anniversary of the Männer Gesangverein Singing Society, tribute was paid to Luder with the inauguration of a cenotaph at the Esperanza Municipal Cemetery.
