= Eduardo Gudiño Kieffer =

Argentine writer (1935–2002)

Eduardo Gudiño Kieffer (November 2, 1935 – September 20, 2002) was an Argentine writer.

== Biography ==
Kieffer was born on November 2, 1935, in Esperanza, Santa Fe in Argentina. On his mother's side, he was related to Argentinian painter Sebastian Spreng.

He was part of the Latin American literature boom of the 1960s. He graduated as a lawyer at the Universidad del Litoral in Santa Fe but never practiced law. He wrote novels, essays, short stories, children's books, scripts and theatre plays. He was also a renowned journalist. For many years he was a columnist for the Culture page of the newspaper La Nación. His books have been translated into many languages.

He was also part of the jury in many literary competitions. His main theme was Buenos Aires, and he was named "Ciudadano Ilustre de la Ciudad" (Distinguished Citizen of Buenos Aires).

He was married to Beatriz Trento and later divorced, they had three children. He died in Buenos Aires on September 20, 2002.

== Works ==
=== Novels ===
- Gudiño Kieffer, Eduardo (1968). Para Comerte Mejor. Buenos Aires, Argentina: Editorial Losada.
- Gudiño Kieffer, Eduardo (1972). Guía de Pecadores: en la cual se contiene una larga y copiosa exhortación a la virtud y guarda de los mandamientos divinos. Buenos Aires, Argentina: Editorial Losada.
- Gudiño Kieffer, Eduardo (1975). La Hora de María y el Pájaro de Oro. Buenos Aires, Argentina: Editorial Losada.
- Gudiño Kieffer, Eduardo (1975). Será Por Eso Que la Quiero Tanto. Buenos Aires, Argentina: Emecé Editores. ISBN 9789500400183.
- Gudiño Kieffer, Eduardo (1979). Medias Negras, Peluca Rubia. Buenos Aires, Argentina: Emecé Editores.
- Gudiño Kieffer, Eduardo (1980). Ta te Tías y Otros Juegos. Colección Litercuentos: Serie Escritores Argentinos. Emecé.
- Gudiño Kieffer, Eduardo (1982). ¿Somos?. Buenos Aires, Argentina: Emecé Editores. ISBN 9789500400428.
- Gudiño Kieffer, Eduardo (1982). Jaque a Pa y Ma. Buenos Aires, Argentina: Emecé Editores. ISBN 9789500401227.
- Gudiño Kieffer, Eduardo (1983). No Son Tan Buenos Tus Aires. Buenos Aires, Argentina: Emecé Editores. ISBN 9789500402545.
- Gudiño Kieffer, Eduardo (1984). Un Ángel En Patitas. Augstin Gudiño Kieffer (illustrator). Buenos Aires, Argentina: Emecé Editores. ISBN 950040317X.
- Szabó, Anikó; Gudiño Kieffer, Eduardo (1986). Buenos Aires Por Arte de Magia. Buenos Aires, Argentina: Ediciones de Arte Gaglianone. ISBN 9789509004764.
- Gudiño Kieffer, Eduardo; Torres Varela, Hilda (1987). Historia y Cuentos del Alfabeto. Buenos Aires, Argentina: Emecé Editores. ISBN 9789500405768.
- Gudiño Kieffer, Eduardo (1987). Angeles Buscando Infancia. Buenos Aires, Argentina: Ediciones de Arte Gaglianone. ISBN 9789509004870.
- Gudiño Kieffer, Eduardo (1988). Nombres de Mujer. Buenos Aires, Argentina: Emecé Editores. ISBN 9789500407489.
- Gudiño Kieffer, Eduardo (1988). Kérkyra, Kérkyra. Escritores argentinos. Buenos Aires, Argentina: Emecé Editores. ISBN 978-9500408530.
- Gudiño Kieffer, Eduardo (1994). Bajo Amor en Alta Mar: un Crimen en el Eugenio C. Buenos Aires, Argentina: Planeta. ISBN 9789507425929.
- Gudiño Kieffer, Eduardo (1995). El Príncipe de los Lirios. Buenos Aires, Argentina: Emecé Editores. ISBN 9789500415217.
- Gudiño Kieffer, Eduardo (1998). Malas, Malísimas: Cinco Damas Perversas. Buenos Aires, Argentina: Ameghino. ISBN 9789879216392.
- Gudiño Kieffer, Eduardo (1998). 10 Fantasmas de Buenos Aires. Buenos Aires, Argentina: Emecé Editores. ISBN 9789879216392.

=== Essays ===
- Short stories' collections: Fabulario (1960)
- Gudiño Kieffer, Eduardo (1970). Carta Abierta a Buenos Aires Violento [Open Letter to Violent Buenos Aires]. Buenos Aires, Argentina: Emecé Editores.
- Manual para nativos pensantes (1985)
- A Buenos Aires (1986)
- Gudiño Kieffer, Eduardo (1986). El Peinetón. Buenos Aires, Argentina: Ediciones de arte Gaglianone. ISBN 978-9509004757.

=== Scripts ===
- Vení conmigo (1972)
- La hora de María y el pájaro de oro (1975)
- Desde el abismo (1980)
