= Borla =

Borla is a surname. Notable people with the surname include:

- Hector Borla (1937–2002), Argentine painter and illustrator

== See also ==
- Borla, a village in Bocşa Commune, Sălaj County, Romania
- In Spanish borla means "tassel"
