= Fondo Nacional de las Artes =

National Endowment for the Arts
- Fondo Nacional de las Artes

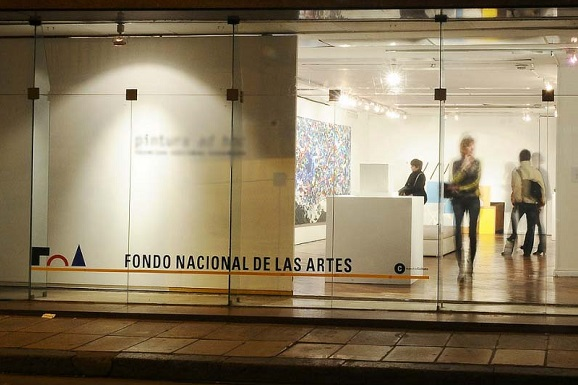
- FNA offices in Buenos Aires

Agency overview
- Formed: 1958; 67 years ago
- Headquarters: Buenos Aires
- Agency executive: Tulio Andreussi Guzmán, President
- Parent agency: Secretaría de Presidencia
- Website: argentina.gob.ar/fna

The National Endowment for the Arts (Spanish: Fondo Nacional de las Artes, abbreviated "FNA") is a cultural public organization created in Buenos Aires, Argentina, in 1958. Its purpose is to promote cultural, educational and literary activities in Argentina.

The FNA, a public institution controlled by the Secretaría de Presidencia, pioneered internationally because of its structure and prospective politics. It was the origin and source of renowned international bodies like the Fondo Internacional para la Promoción de la Cultura de la Unesco in 1974 and other institutions in various countries. Since 1960, the FNA has given scholarships to artists and professionals to study in Buenos Aires and abroad, and also finances, every year, a large number of cultural projects. Notable international artists awarded by the FNA include:

- Joaquín Ezequiel Linares (born 1927), studied in Paris, 1960.
- Héctor Borla (1937–2002), studied in Buenos Aires, 1962.
- Marta Minujin (born 1943), studied in Paris, 1960.
- Patricio Pouchulu (born 1965), studied in London, 1997–98.

The FNA also helps a large number of national, provincial, and local public institutions in the whole country (museums, libraries, archives, artistic schools, cultural institutes) through different programmes and in various financial ways. The application process, both for individuals and institutions, is complex and strict. The FNA holds a large video digital archive, offered to the general public and open to national and international researchers. The FNA is directed by a president and a body of renowned Argentinean public figures related to different artistic activities: painting, visual arts, architecture, literature, theatre, dance and music.

The Milei administration tried to shut down the FNA as part of a law project put forward in early 2024. The revised version that was voted after the first version failed has no provisions regarding the institution, though the President can still use the emergency powers granted by the bill against the FNA.
