= San Martín Palace =

Ceremonial Headquarters for the Argentinian Ministry of Foreign Relations

Coordinates: 34°35′38″S 58°22′42″W

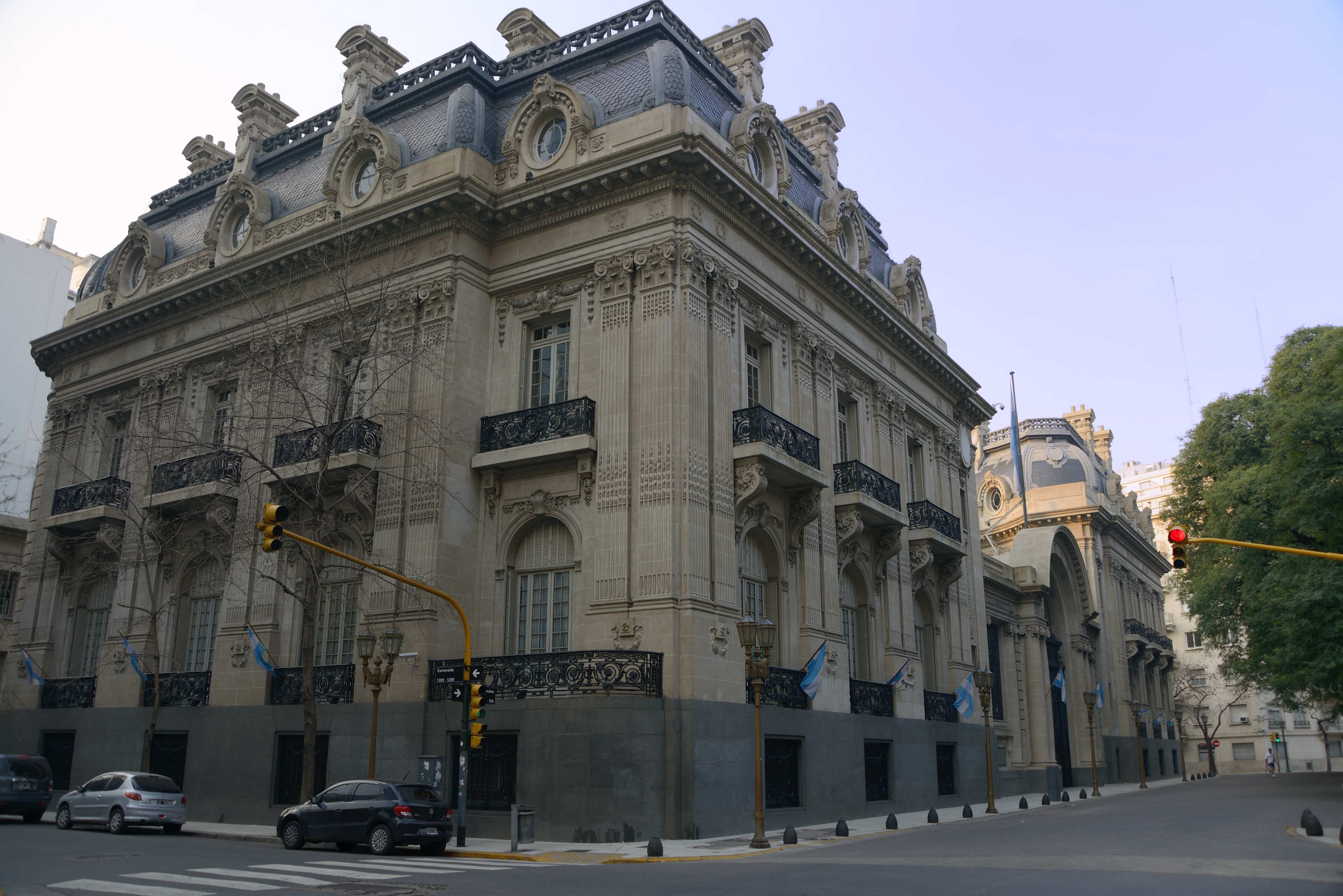
The San Martín Palace

San Martín Palace (Palacio San Martín) is located facing Plaza San Martín in the Retiro neighbourhood of Buenos Aires, Argentina and serves as the Ceremonial Headquarters for the Ministry of Foreign Relations.

== History ==
The Beaux Arts style palace was designed for Mercedes Castellanos de Anchorena by the architect Alejandro Christophersen in 1905. Finished in 1909, the building was acquired by the Argentine government in 1936 and became the headquarters for the Ministry of Foreign Relations. A new headquarters was completed in 1993; the palace became the ministry's ceremonial headquarters.

The palace contains many works of art by Argentine and American artists from the 20th century, including Antonio Berni, Pablo Curatella Manes, Lino Enea Spilimbergo, and Roberto Matta.

== Gallery ==
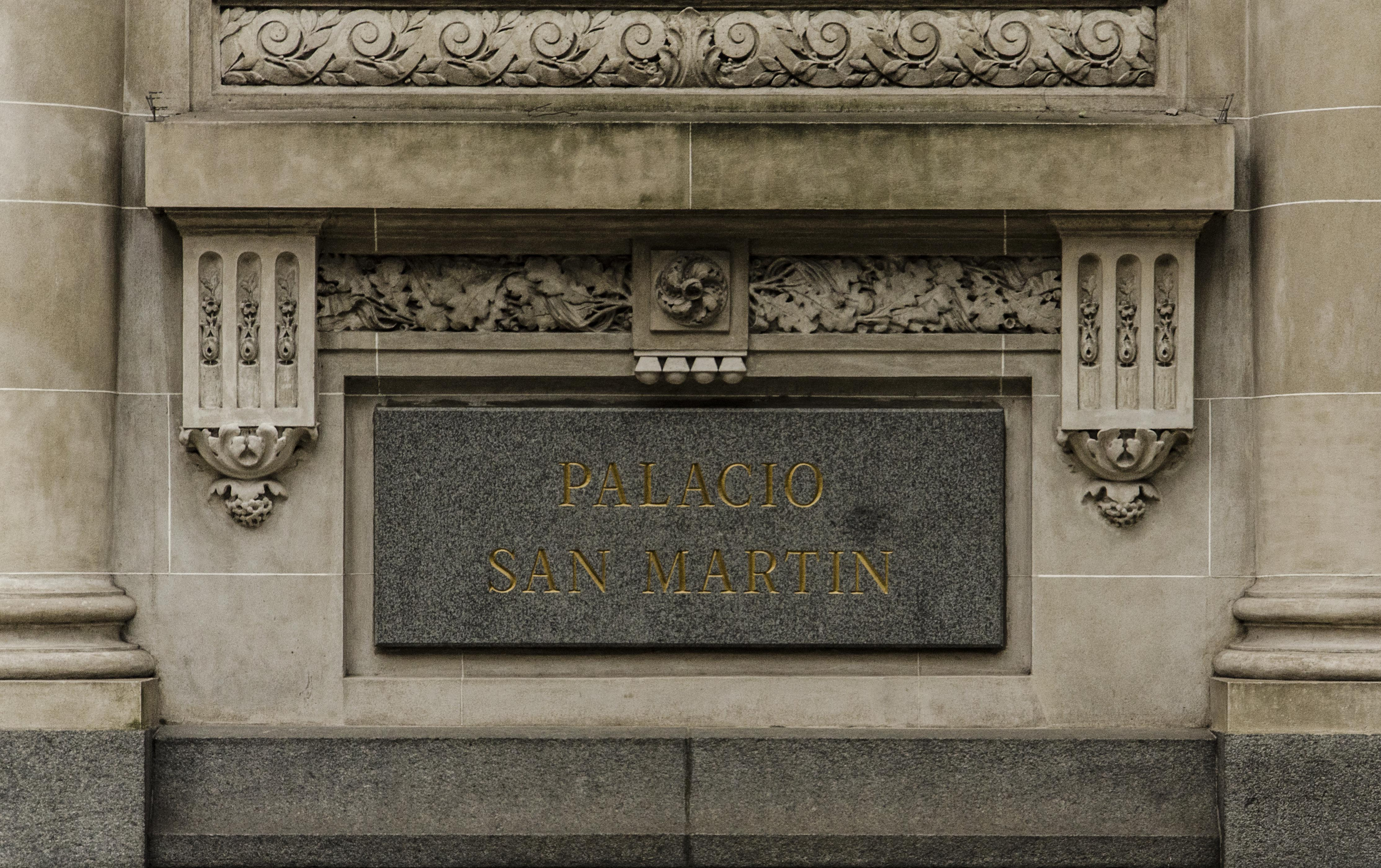

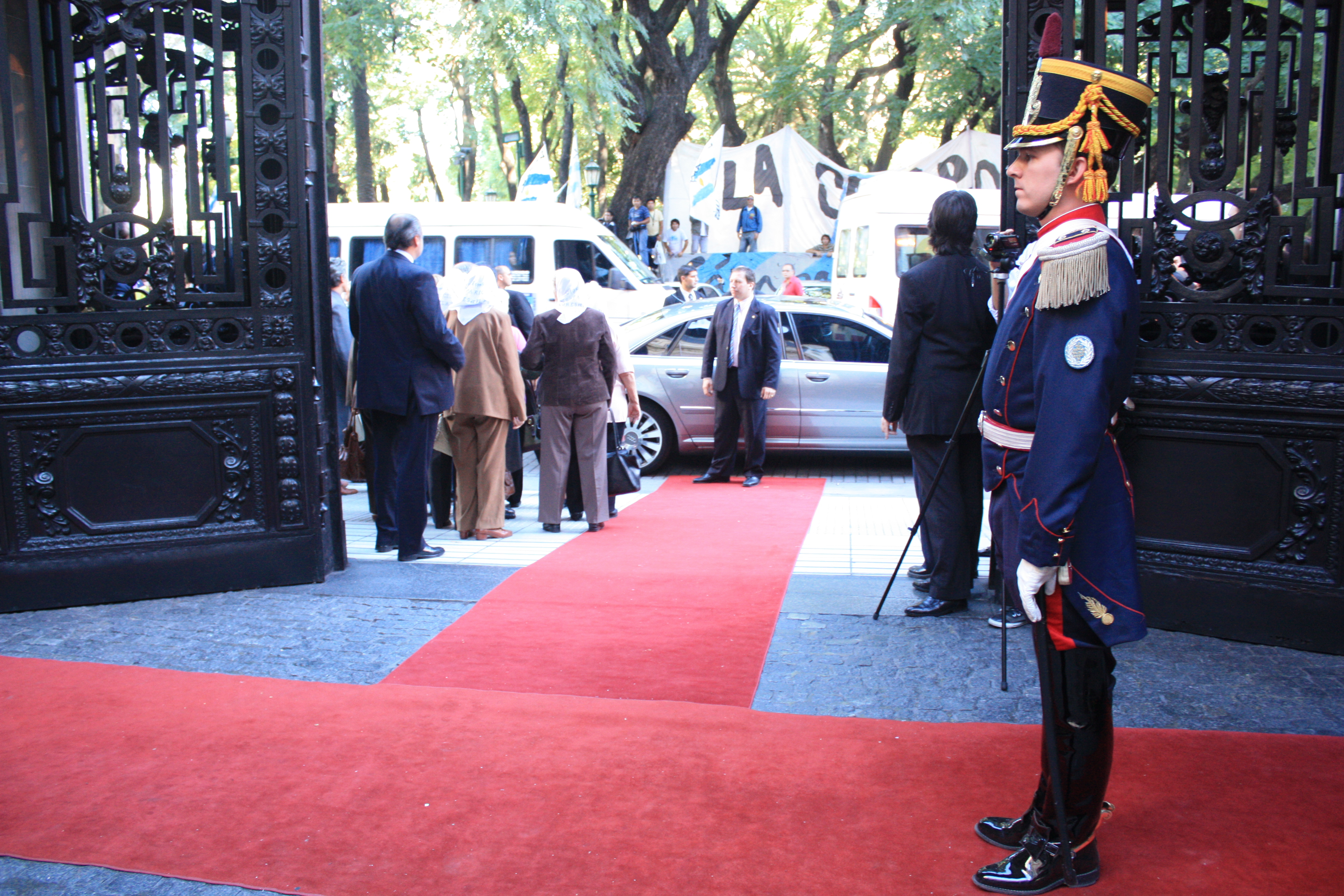

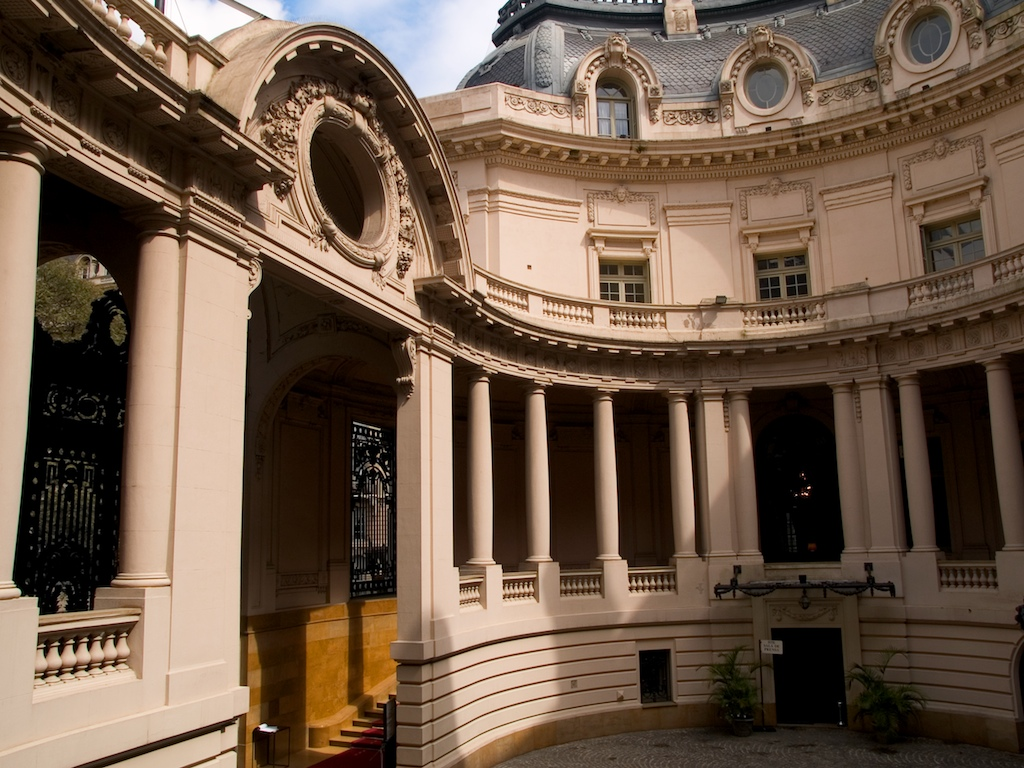

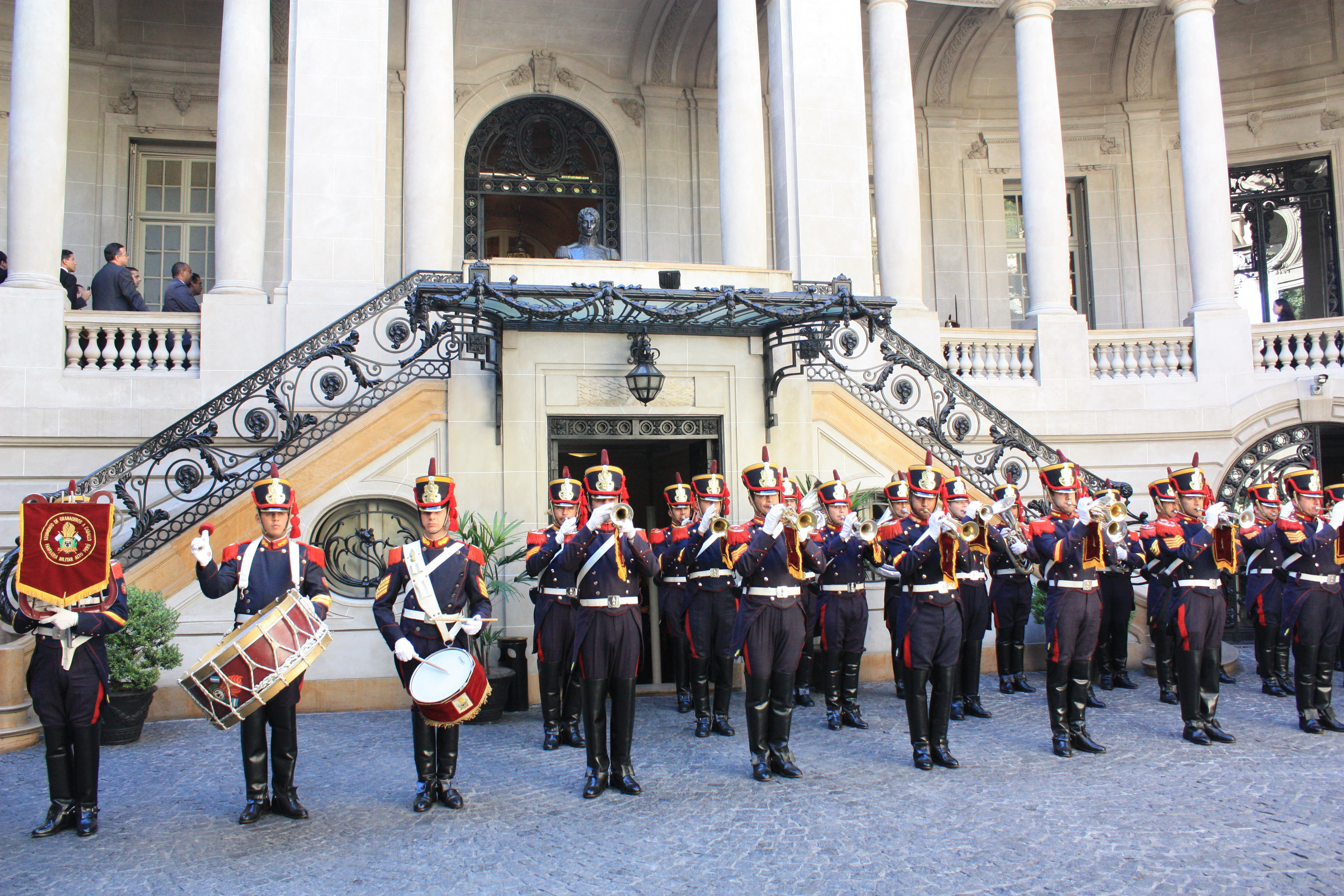

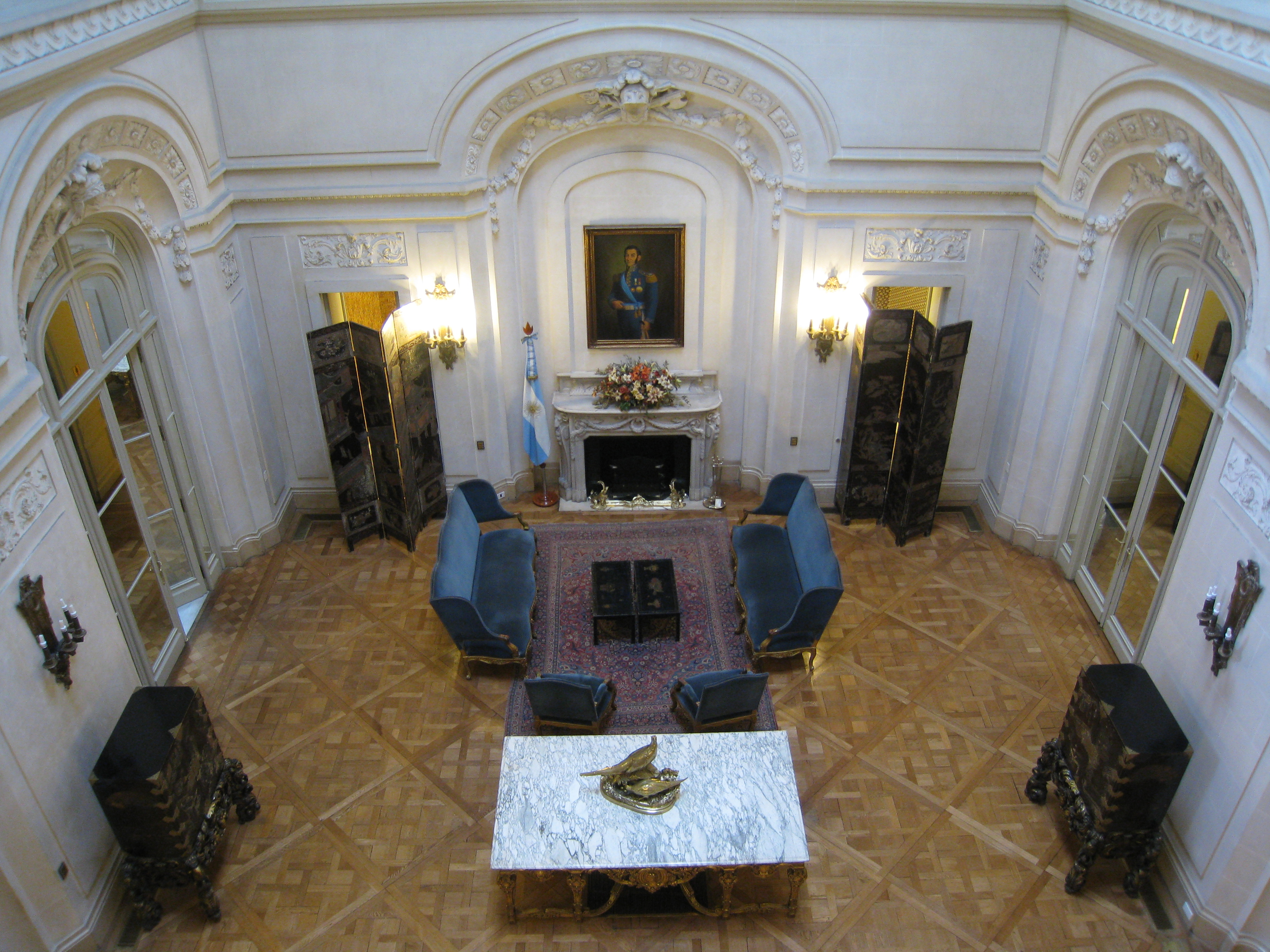

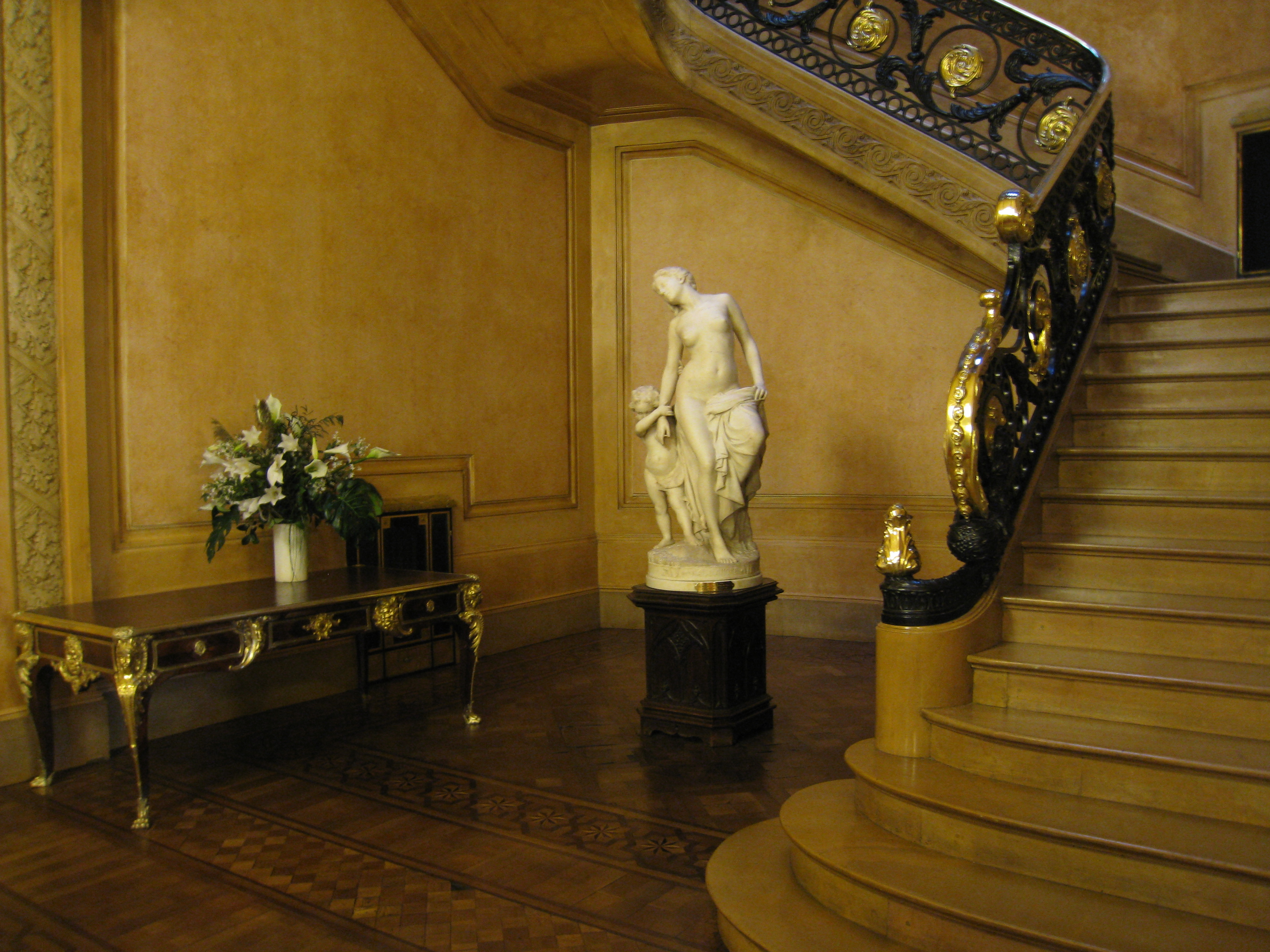

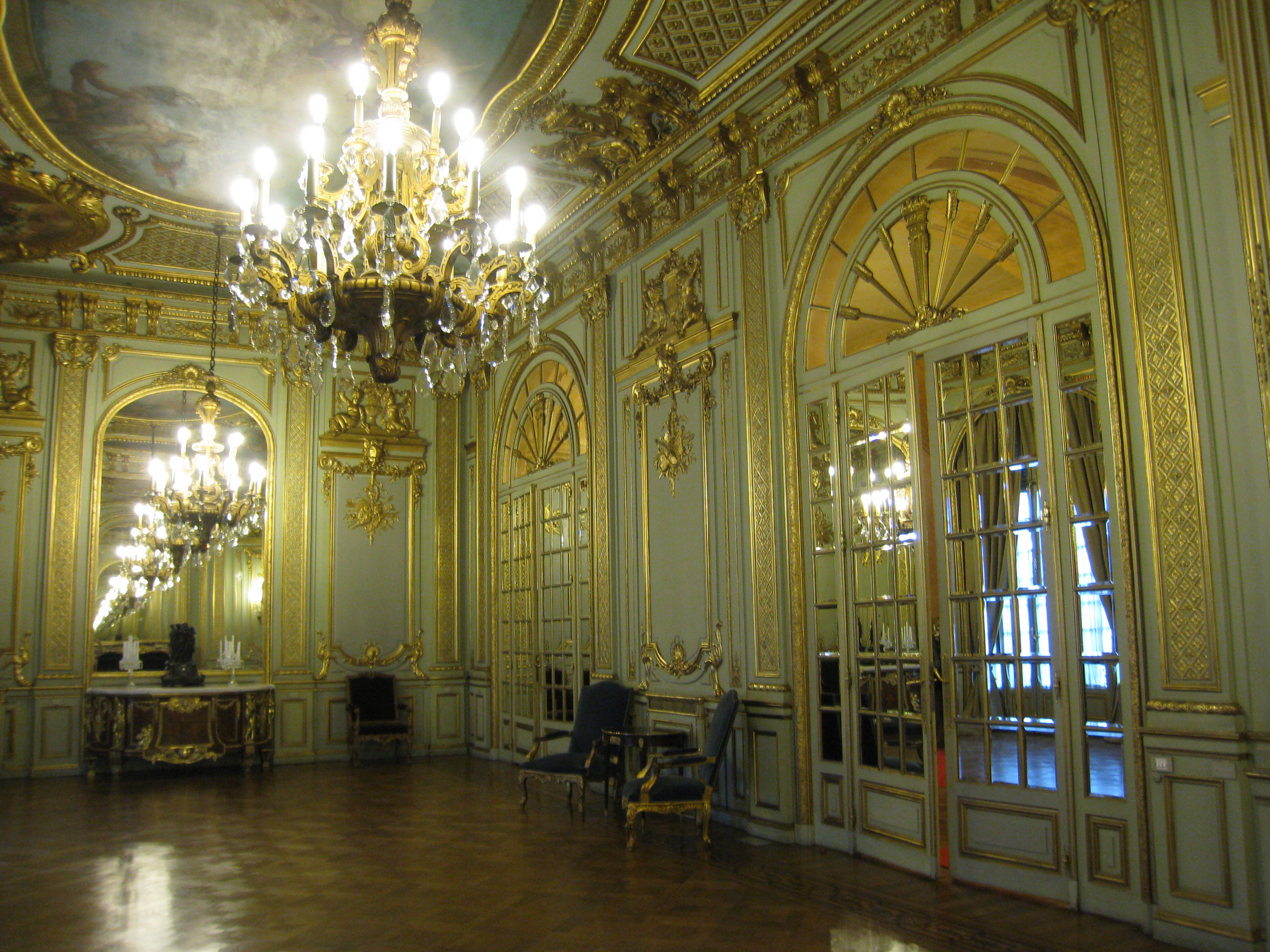

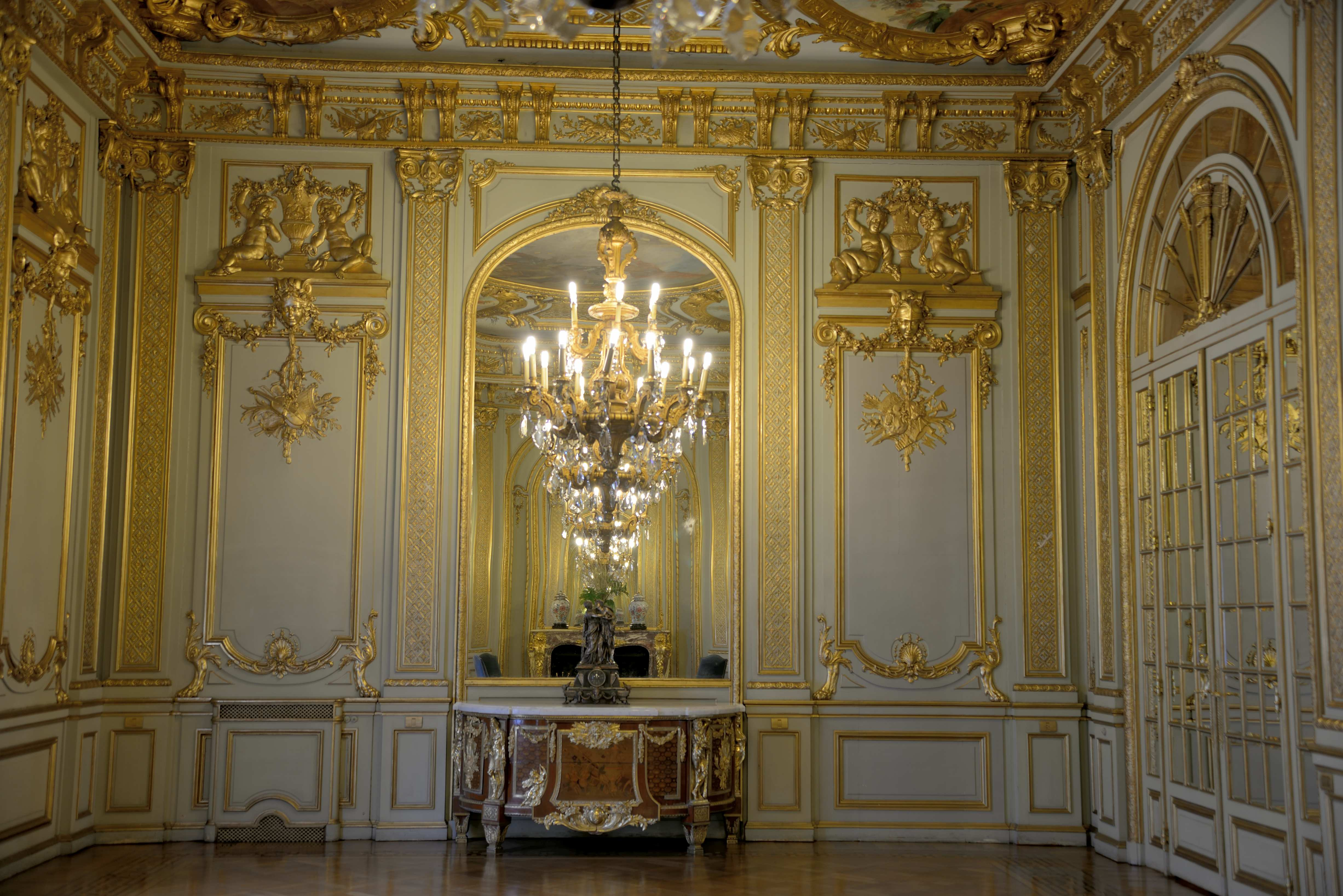

== See also ==
- Kavanagh Building
