= Matías Donnet =

Argentine footballer

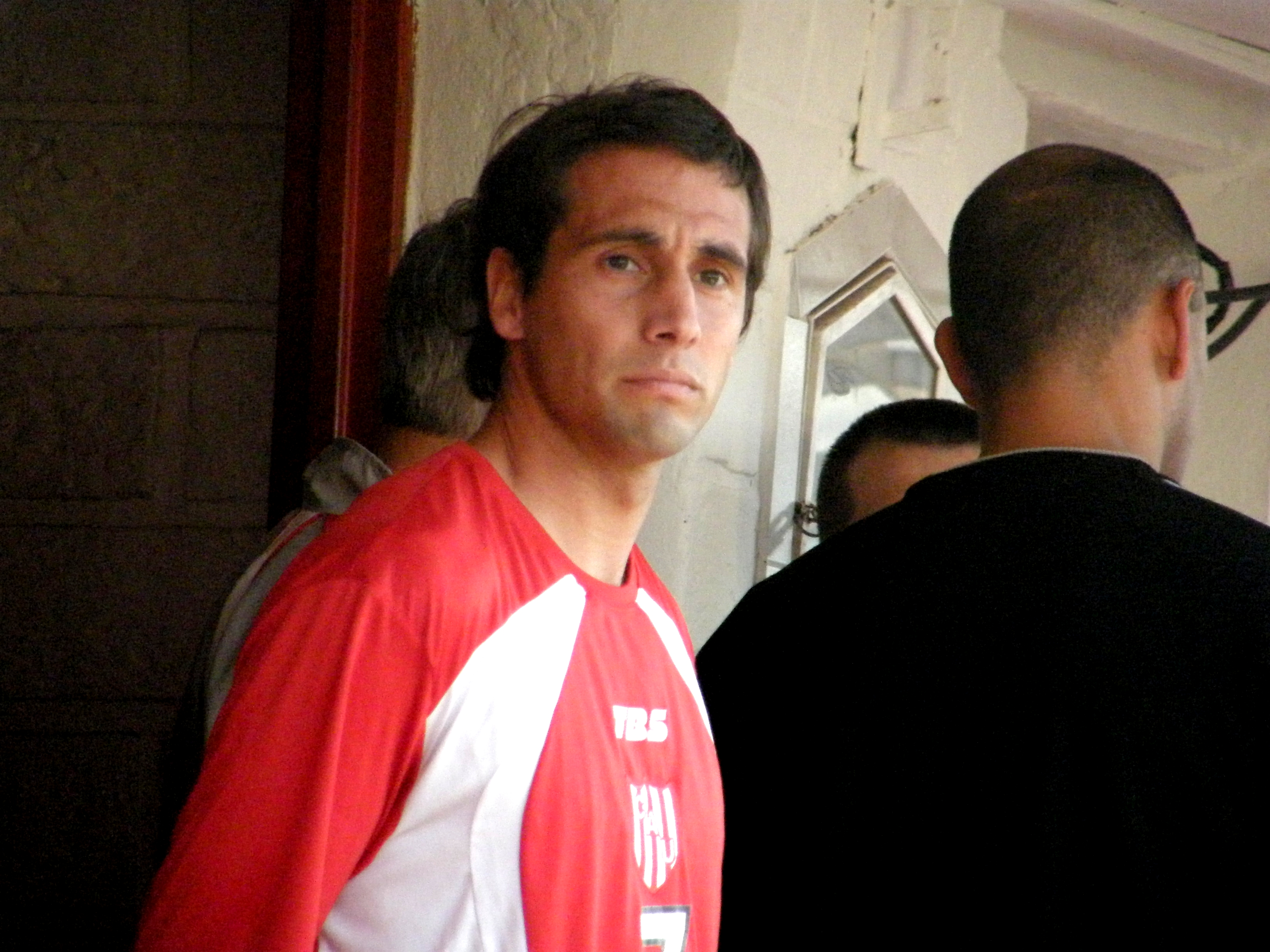

Personal information
- Full name: Matías Abel Donnet
- Date of birth: 18 April 1980 (age 46)
- Place of birth: Esperanza, Santa Fe, Argentina
- Height: 1.73 m (5 ft 8 in)
- Position: Midfielder

Youth career
- 1995: Juventud de Esperanza

Senior career*
Years	Team	Apps	(Gls)
1998–2001	Unión de Santa Fe	57	(12)
2001-2002	Venezia	2	(0)
2002–2006	Boca Juniors	88	(12)
2006	D.C. United	10	(1)
2007	Belgrano	14	(2)
2007–2009	Newell's Old Boys	27	(2)
2009–2010	Unión de Santa Fe	32	(9)
2011	Olimpia	13	(2)
2012–2013	Unión de Santa Fe	38	(3)
2014–2015	Antigua	25	(2)
2016–2019	Juventud de Esperanza		
2024	Juventud de Esperanza		

Managerial career
- 2019–2023: Boca Juniors (youth)
- * Club domestic league appearances and goals

Matías Donnet (born 18 April 1980 in Esperanza, Santa Fe) is an Argentine football manager and former player who played as an attacking midfielder.

== Club career ==
With Boca Juniors he won the Intercontinental Cup 2003, the Copa Libertadores de América 2003, and the Copa Sudamericana 2004 . At the match for the Intercontinental Cup, Donnet scored the equalizer that took the match to penalty shootout, won by Boca 3–1, and was named Man of the Match.

In 2006, he signed with D.C. United of Major League Soccer in the USA. He scored his first and only goal in the MLS on September 26, 2006, against New York Red Bulls. The goal was scored in the 89th minute and turned out to have been the game winner when Red Bull's Jozy Altidore scored to make the score 4–3 United.

Donnet left D.C. United after the 2006 season and returned to Argentina with Belgrano de Córdoba. Between 2007 and 2009 he played for Newell's Old Boys before returning to his first club Unión de Santa Fe. In summer 2014, Donnet signed with Antigua GFC of the Guatemalan Liga Mayor for one year. He is currently one of their top players in the clausura 2015 season.

In April 2016, Donnet returned to his childhood club Juventud. He decided to rest in 2018, but in February 2019 it was confirmed, that he would take one more year at the club. He retired at the club in July 2024.

== Coaching career ==
Between 2019 and 2023, Donnet worked as a youth coach at Boca Juniors.

== Honours ==
Boca Juniors

- Argentine Primera División: 2003 Apertura
- Copa Libertadores: 2003
- Copa Sudamericana: 2004
- Intercontinental Cup: 2003

D.C. United

- Supporters' Shield: 2006

Juventud de Esperanza

- Liga Esperancina de Fútbol: 2017

Olimpia

- Paraguayan Primera División: 2011 Clausura
