= Esperanza, Santa Fe =

Esperanza
- City
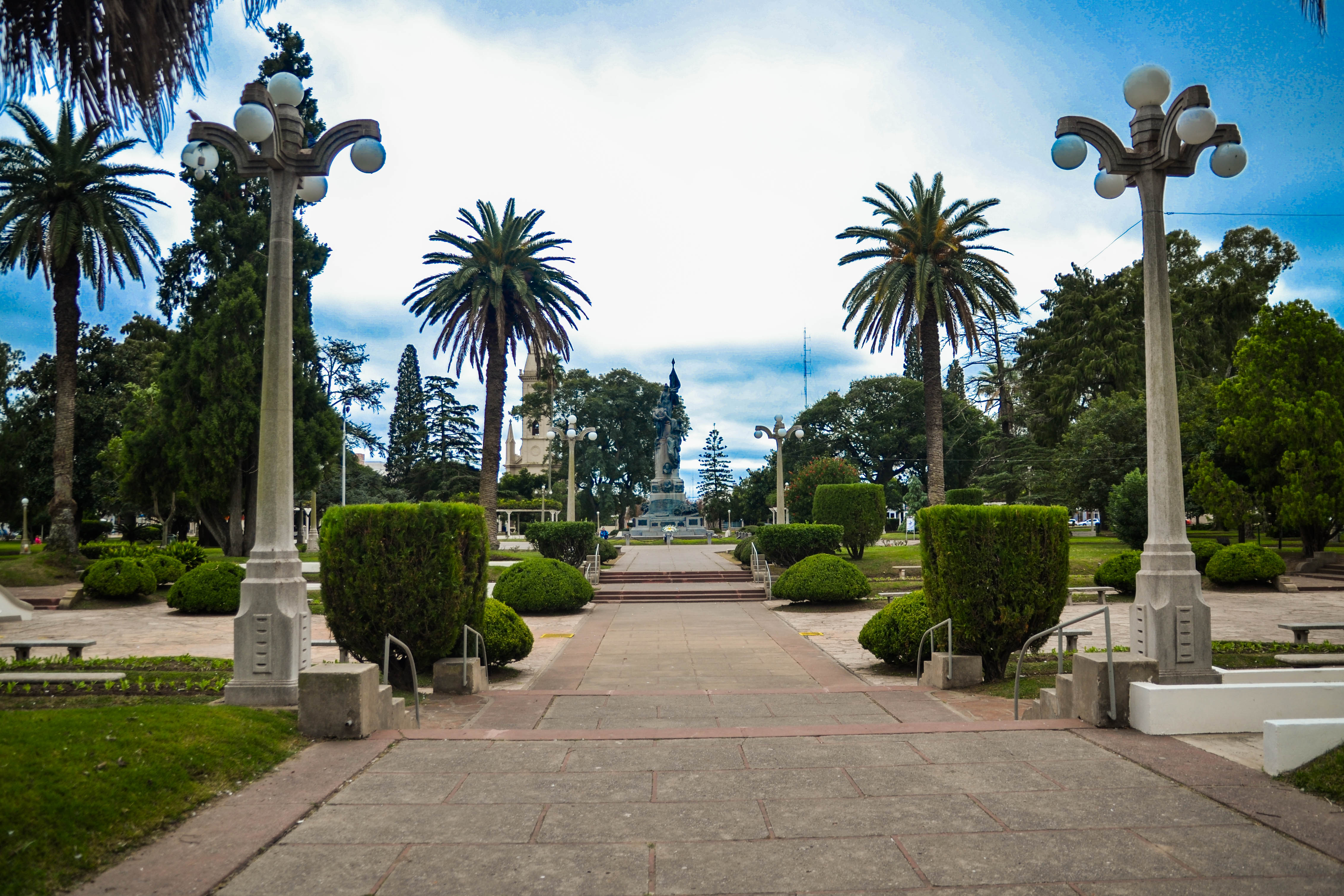

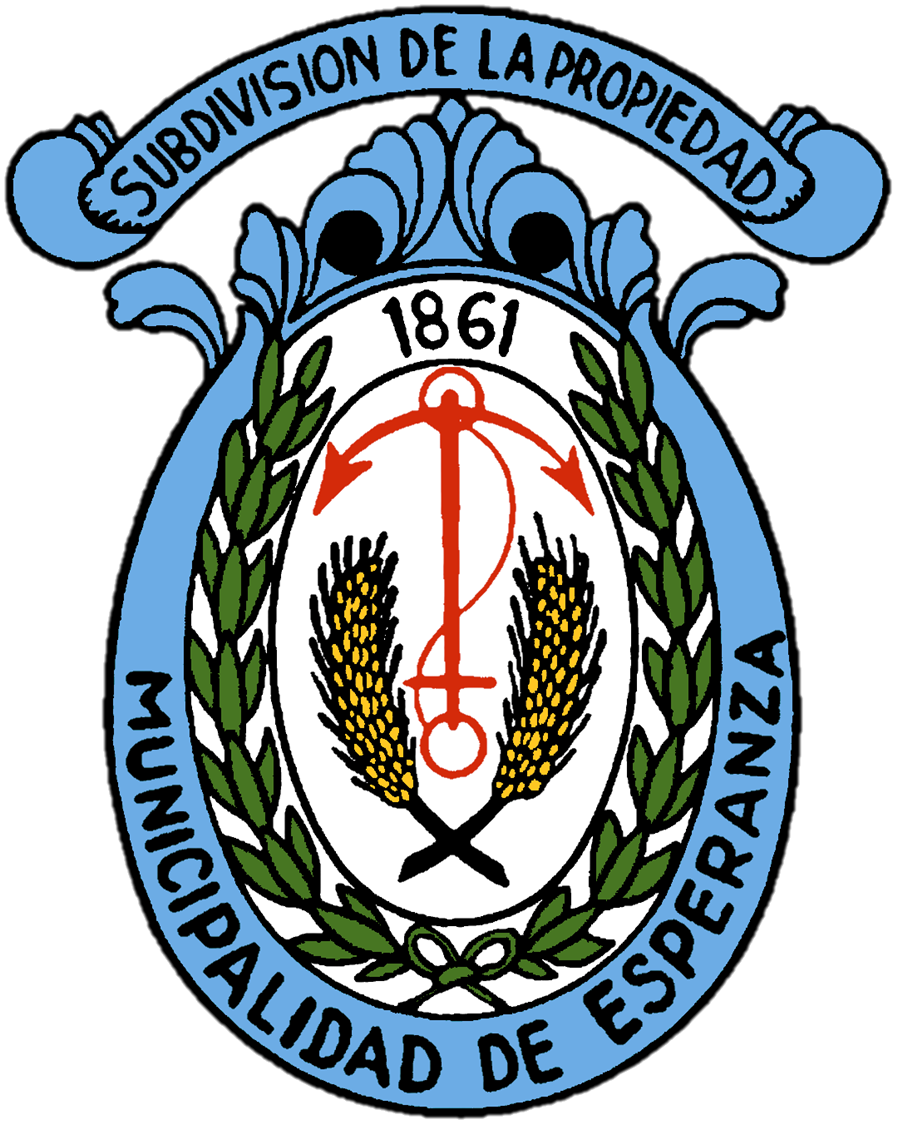
- Flag Coat of arms

- Location of Esperanza in Argentina Esperanza (Santa Fe Province)
- Coordinates: 31°26.56′S 60°55.54′W
- Country: Argentina
- Province: Santa Fe
- Department: Las Colonias
- Founded: September 8, 1856 (170 years ago)
- Founder: Aarón Castellanos

Government
  - Intendant: Rodrigo Müller (UCR)

Area
  - Total: 289 km^{2} (112 sq mi)
- Elevation: 38 m (125 ft)

Population (2022 census)
  - Total: 46 753
  - Density: 145.61/km^{2} (377.1/sq mi)
- Time zone: UTC−3 (ART)
- CPA base: S3080
- Dialing code: +54 3496
- Website: Official website

Esperanza is a city in the center of the province of Santa Fe, Argentina. It has 46,753 inhabitants according to the 2022 census [INDEC] and it is the head town of the Las Colonias Department.

Esperanza is at the heart of the most important dairy district of the country (milk production is based on the Holando-Argentino breed). Cattle farming is also a major activity. Additionally it hosts many small and medium industries in a variety of sectors (wood, metal mechanics, food products, book printing, editorials, textile, leather, etc.).

== History ==
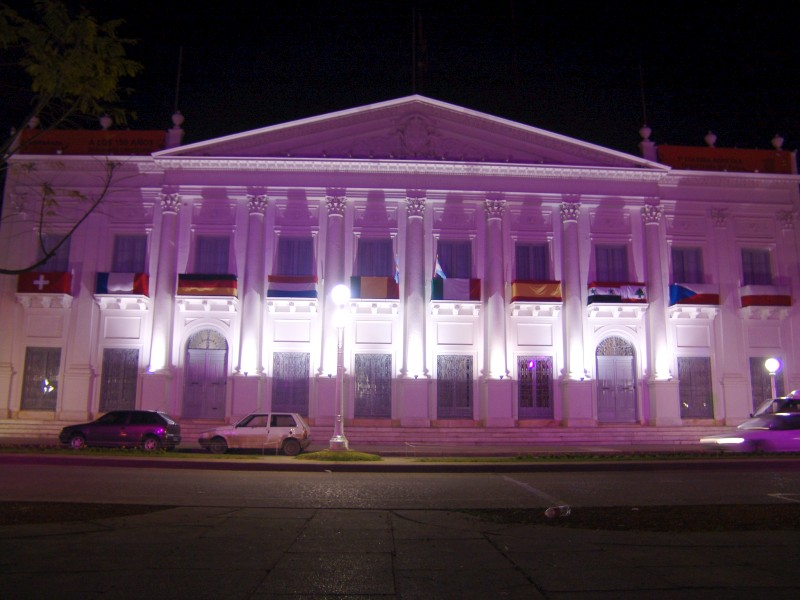
City Hall, Esperanza, Santa Fe.

Esperanza was the first formally organized agricultural colony in Argentina, formed by 200 families of immigrants from Switzerland, Germany, France, Italy, Belgium and Luxembourg who arrived during January and February 1856. The town was officially founded on 8 September 1856. The lands for each family in the colony had been set aside on 15 June 1853 by an agreement (the Agricultural Colonization Contract) between the government of Santa Fe and the entrepreneur Aarón Castellanos. The original name of the city was Colonia Esperanza, that is "Colony Hope".

The city was the third one in the province to have a Municipal Council, after Rosario and Santa Fe, on 4 May 1861. It was declared the head town of its department in 1884. In 1892, it hosted the first Agricultural Congress of the Republic.

In 1944, the national government decreed that September 8, the feast of the birth of the Virgin Mary (patron of Esperanza), was to be the National Day of the Agricultural Worker, and in 1979 Esperanza was declared permanent seat of the National Festival of Agriculture and National Agricultural Worker Day.

== Notable people ==
- Fernando Paillet, photographer
- Gastón Gori, essayist, writer
- Eduardo Gudiño Kieffer, writer and journalist
- Álvaro Alsogaray, politician
- José Pedroni, poet and writer
- Aldo Tessio, politician
- Hector Borla, visual artist
- Sebastian Spreng, visual artist
- Matías Donnet, football player

== Sister Cities ==
Esperanza is twinned with:

- Champéry, Switzerland (2012)
- Hérémence, Switzerland (2012)
- Riddes, Switzerland (2012)
- Saint-Martin, Switzerland (2012)
- Trient, Switzerland (2012)
- Vex, Switzerland (2012)
