= Aarón Castellanos, Santa Fe =

Aarón Castellanos
- Locality
- Location of Aarón Castellanos Aarón Castellanos (Argentina)
- Coordinates: 34°19′S 62°23′W
- Country: Argentina
- Province: Santa Fe
- Department: General López

Government
  - Communal President: Walter Ramanzin (FPCyS)

Area
  - Total: 389 km^{2} (150 sq mi)

Population
  - Total: 309
  - Density: 0.794/km^{2} (2.06/sq mi)
- Time zone: UTC−3 (ART)
- CPA base: S6106

Aarón Castellanos is a municipality in the General López Department of Santa Fe Province, in northeastern Argentina. It is located 449 km from the provincial capital Santa Fe.

== Foundation ==
Officially founded 21 February 1911.

On 23 March 1903, the Argentinian aristocrat Mercedes Castellanos de Anchorena ordered her representative, Angel Leanes, to found a new town at the Soler stop of the Buenos Aires and Pacific Railway line. It was to be named Aarón Castellanos, in honour of the founder of Esperanza, the colony which initiated Santa Fe's colonization.

A month later, on 29 April 1903, the bishop of Santa Fe approved Anchorena's plan for the foundation of a missionary convent. At the time, the Franciscan community had an important presence in the area, not just fulfilling their religious and spiritual duties but also acting as administrators and controllers for the materials sent by Anchorena for the convent's construction. It was later followed by a church and a hospital.

== Toponymy ==
Named after Aarón Castellanos, considered the father of European emigration in Argentina.

== Population ==
The municipality consisted of 309 inhabitants in 2010, representing a decline in population compared with the previous census of 2001. See chart below for population change in Aarón Castellanos between 1991 and 2010 according to the Indec National Census.

== Patron Saint ==
Christ the Redeemer, 4 October.
