= Enrique Larreta =

Argentine writer (1875-1961)

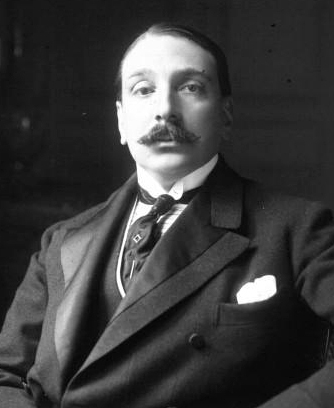
- Larreta in 1914
- Born: Enrique Rodríguez Larreta; 4 March 1875 Buenos Aires, Argentina
- Died: 6 July 1961 (aged 86) Buenos Aires, Argentina
- Occupation: Writer, historian
- Language: Spanish, French

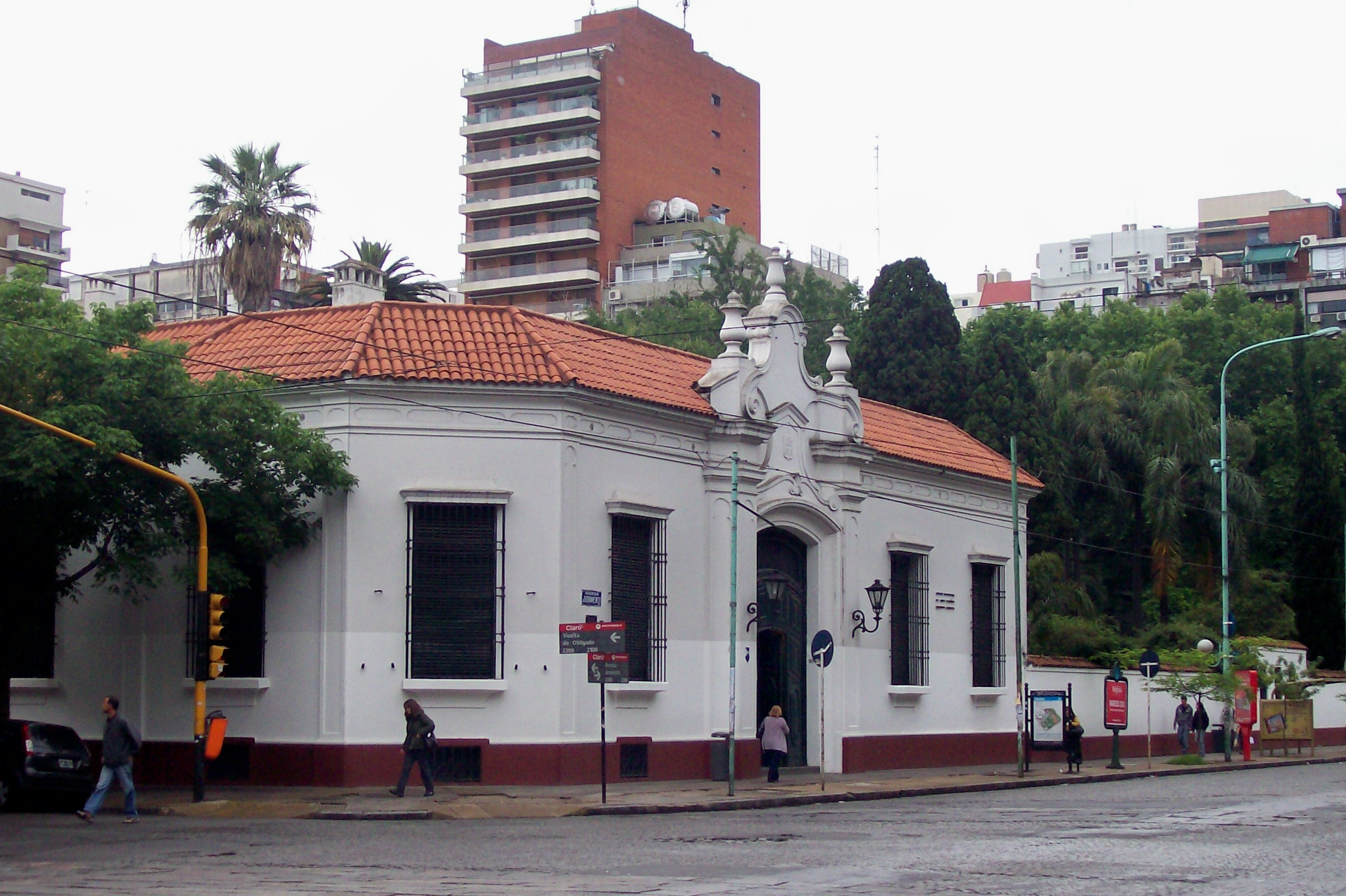
Larreta's house, today the municipal Museum of Spanish Art.

Enrique Rodríguez Larreta (March 4, 1875 – July 6, 1961) was an Argentine writer, academic, diplomat and art collector. He was nominated for the Nobel Prize in Literature ten times.

== Biography ==
Larreta was born in Buenos Aires to Adela Maza and Carlos Rodríguez Larreta. A member of a traditionally upper-class family from Uruguay, he was married to Josefina Anchorena Castellanos, a daughter of Mercedes Castellanos de Anchorena and member of one of the most aristocratic, landowning families of Argentina, the Anchorenas. They had five children; Mercedes, Enrique (born 1902), Josefina (born 1905), Agustin (born 1909) and Fernando (born 1911). He studied law, and graduated at the University of Buenos Aires in 1897. He later taught medieval history at the Colegio Nacional de Buenos Aires, and worked as history teacher.

Larreta earned renown as a writer with La gloria de don Ramiro, one of the representative Argentine works of Hispanic modernism, in 1908. Don Ramiro, a soldier during the time of Philip II of Spain, embodies the Christian conflict between temporal needs and a more spiritual life. He then served as Ambassador to France from 1910 to 1919, and lived during 1915 and 1916 in Biarritz, France and in Ávila, Spain, where he met Miguel de Unamuno and a street now bears his name. As a playwright, his first piece, La lampe d'argile, written in French, opened in Paris in 1917. This was followed by La luciernaga (1923; Firefly), El linyera (1932; The Bum), Santa Maria del Buen Ayre (1935), considered his best, and Tenia que suceder (1943; It had to Happen). He participated in the Ibero-American Exposition of 1929, in Seville, was a member of the National Academy of History of Argentina, and of the Royal Spanish Academy, spending a large part of his later years in Madrid. The cities of Alcalá de Henares, Madrid and Segovia also have streets named after him.

Larreta died in 1961, and was interred at La Recoleta Cemetery. His home in Buenos Aires became the Museo de Arte Español Enrique Larreta in 1962. Built by architect Ernesto Bunge in 1886, this Spanish colonial-styled house is graced with an Andalusian palace garden; an unusual oasis in the middle of the hustle and bustle of Buenos Aires. When Larreta came back from Europe and settled in the Belgrano neighborhood he brought a vast collection of Spanish art and furniture from France. The Renaissance and Baroque collection gives the house the feel of a Spanish museum, and is mostly from the same period as his historical novel, Don Ramiro.

== Works ==
- Artemis, (1896)
- La Gloria de Don Ramiro: Una vida en tiempos de Felipe II, (1908; The Glory of Don Ramiro: A Life in the Times of Philip II)
- La que buscaba Don Juan (1923; The One Don Juan Sought), dated 1922, but first produced as "La luciérnaga" in 1923
- Zogoibi (1926; The Unfortunate One)
- Santa Maria del Buen Aire: Drama en tres actos, (1936)
- Las dos fundaciones de Buenos Aires, (1938)
- La calle de vida y de la muerte. Poesias, (1941)
- Tenia que suceder, (1943)
- La naranja (1948; The Orange), a volume of memoirs and essays
- Gerardo o la torre de las damas, (1953; Gerardo, or the Tower of the Ladies)
- Obras Completas, (1954)
- En la pampa (1955; On the Pampas)
