= Aarón Castellanos =

Argentine businessman and military commander

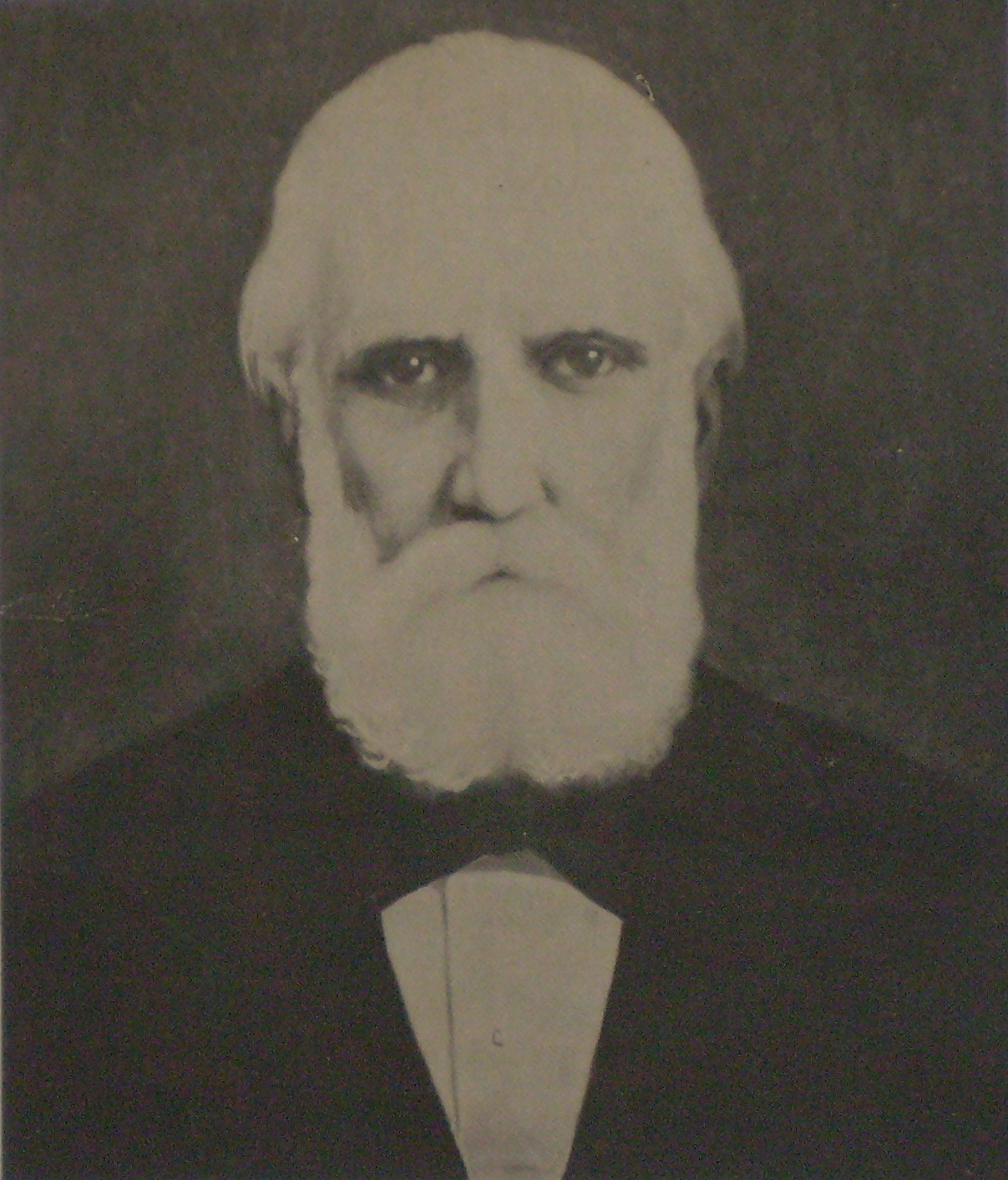

Aarón Castellanos (August 8, 1799 – April 1, 1880) was an Argentine businessman and military commander. He founded the city of Esperanza in the Santa Fe Province. A locality bearing his name, is also named after him.

== Early life and education ==
Aarón Castellanos was born into an aristocratic family in Salta. His exact birth date is disputed: some sources state that he was born on 8 August 1799, while others claim he was born on the same date in 1800, in 1801, or even in 1802. He spent his early years in his hometown.

At a young age, he joined the cavalry unit known as Los Infernales, where he achieved the rank of lieutenant. Under the command of General Martín Miguel de Güemes, he took part in the wars of independence against royalist forces in Upper Peru.

He later became involved in the mining trade with Peru, where he amassed a fortune working in the gold and silver mines of Pasco, one of the most important mining centers in the region.

== Foundation of Esperanza ==
On June 15, 1853, Aarón Castellanos and Manuel Leiva, who was the provincial government minister acting on behalf of Governor Domingo Crespo, signed the first Agricultural Colonization Contract for the province of Santa Fe, in which the colonizer undertook to populate the area with European families and farmers, in exchange for the government granting them, a portion of land to each of them under the property subdivision system.

The government of Santa Fe and Castellanos chose the land where the immigrants would settle: the government chose the west bank of the Paraná River and the businessman chose both banks of the Salado River and the north of the town of San Javier. The provincial government undertook to give each foreign family twenty blocks of public land, which would belong to them after five years. Each contingent of settlers consisted of two hundred families, each of which was given a ranch, agricultural tools, food, cotton seeds, tobacco, wheat, corn, potatoes, and peanuts to plant on ten blocks of land. They were also given oxen and horses to facilitate their work.

Thanks to their work, the Esperanza agricultural colony was formed, which encouraged the settlement of the province of Santa Fe by getting 200 European families to settle there, to whom the government gave 33 hectares of land, seeds, and tools for their work. By 1861, the colony's crops covered 5,400 hectares, where wheat, barley, peanuts, corn, and other cereals were grown.
