= Museo de Arte Español Enrique Larreta =

Coordinates: 34°33′40″S 58°27′20.5″W

Museum of Spanish Art Enrique Larreta
- Museo de Arte Español Enrique Larreta
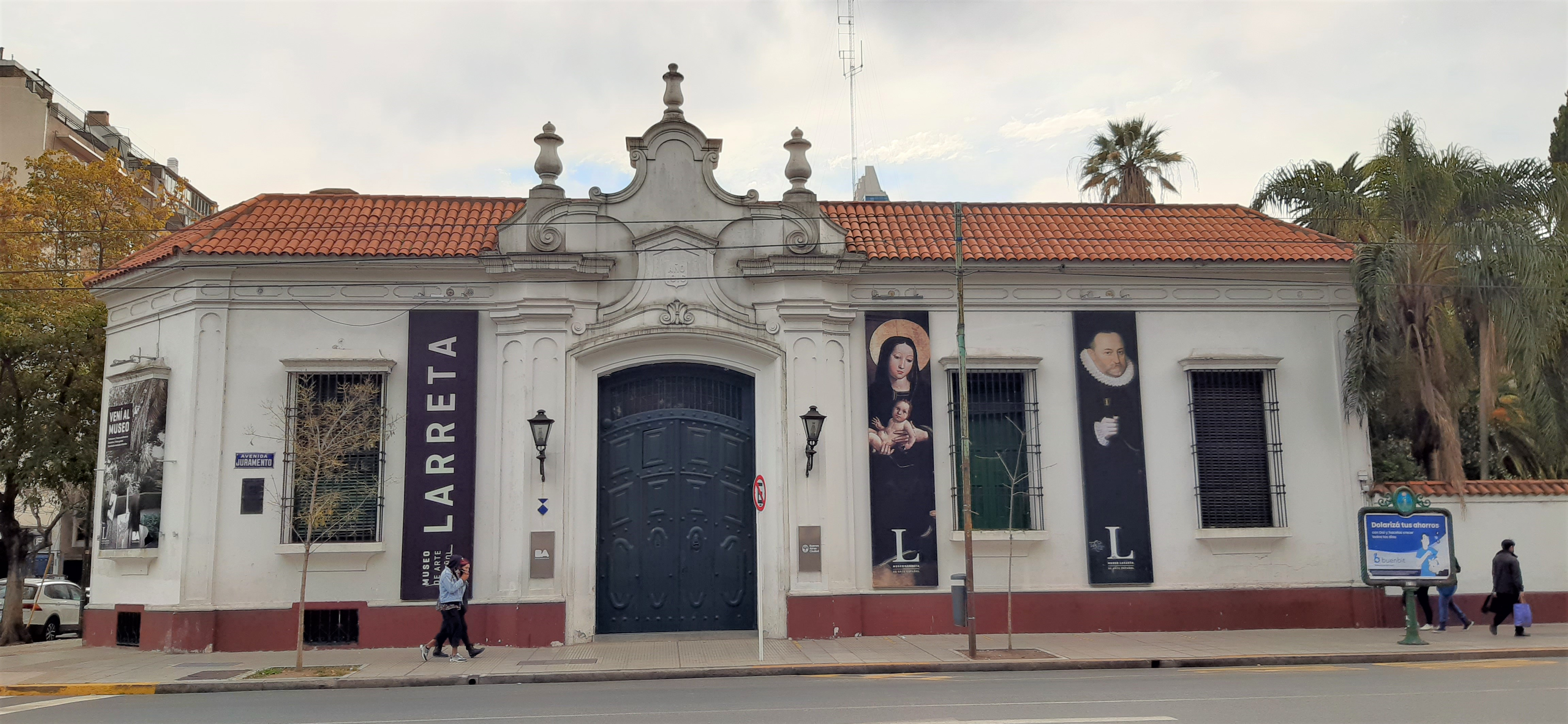
- Established: October 12, 1962; 63 years ago
- Location: 2291 Juramento Street; Buenos Aires, Argentina
- Type: Art museum
- Visitors: 40,000 annually
- Director: Mercedes Picot
- Architect: Ernesto Bunge
- Owner: Buenos Aires City
- Website: buenosaires.gob.ar/museolarreta

The Museo de Arte Español Enrique Larreta is a museum of Spanish art located in the Belgrano ward of Buenos Aires, Argentina.

== Overview ==
The museum resulted from the purchase by the city of the Buenos Aires home of Enrique Larreta, perhaps the most prominent Argentine exponent of Hispanic modernism in literature, and Ambassador to France from 1910 to 1919. Larreta made numerous visits to Ávila, Spain, during his tenure, and he amassed a large collection of medieval art, armor, tapestries, Spanish Renaissance art, Spanish baroque art and decor, manuscripts, wood carvings, and French furniture, among other collections.

Larreta died in 1961, and his family sold his home and its collections to the City of Buenos Aires for its conversion into the Museum of Spanish Art. The museum was inaugurated in 1962, and named in his honor. Its collections were enriched further by the 1977 transfer of portions of the Isaac Fernández Blanco Museum of Hispanic Art.

The former Larreta home, designed by Argentine architect Ernesto Bunge, for Francisco Chas Belgrano and his wife Catalina de los Remedios Salas and inaugurated in 1886, is a work of neo-Spanish colonial architecture, and features an Andalusian patio measuring 6,500 m² (70,000 ft²) and connected to the house via an extensive portico. The property was purchased by Larreta's mother-in-law, Mercedes Castellanos de Anchorena, and given to the newlywed couple in 1903. Much as Martín Noël did with the property that later became the Isaac Fernández Blanco Museum, Larreta had the home expanded and refurbished along neo-colonial lines (restauración nacionalista, as the designs were known). Historical, as well as religious, designs were used, and the ornamented portal, for instance, was a copy of the entry to the Casa Basavilbaso (a former customs house which had earlier been demolished). Completed in 1916, these works were designed by Christian Schindler.

The extensive gardens feature ginkgo biloba, ombú, wisteria, cypress, palm, bitter orange, and silk floss trees, as well as buxus hedges totaling around 700 m (2,300 ft). The museum also includes the Alfonso El Sabio Library, specializing in Spanish literature, and La Casita de Arriba, a children's learning annex.

== Gallery ==
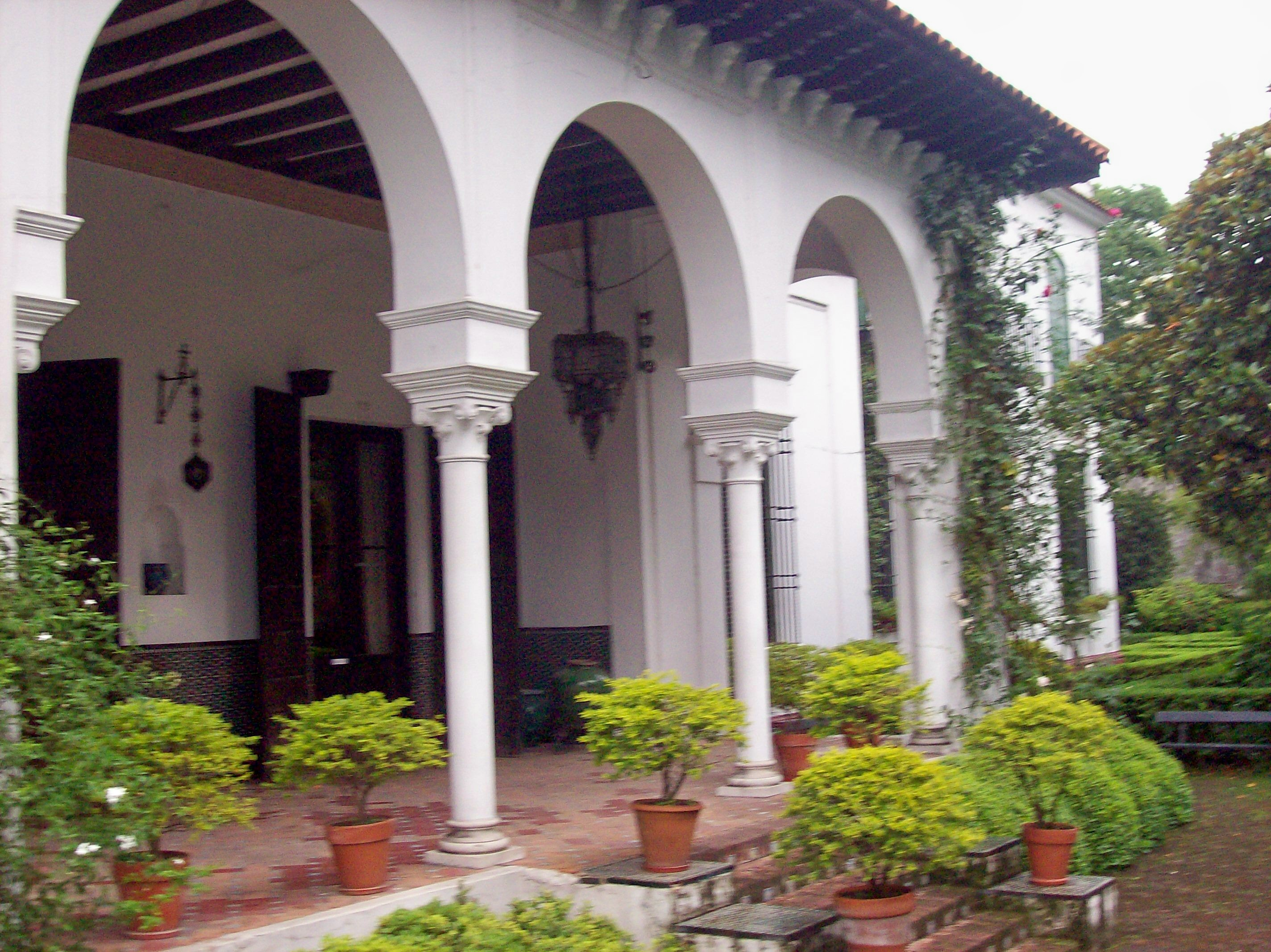

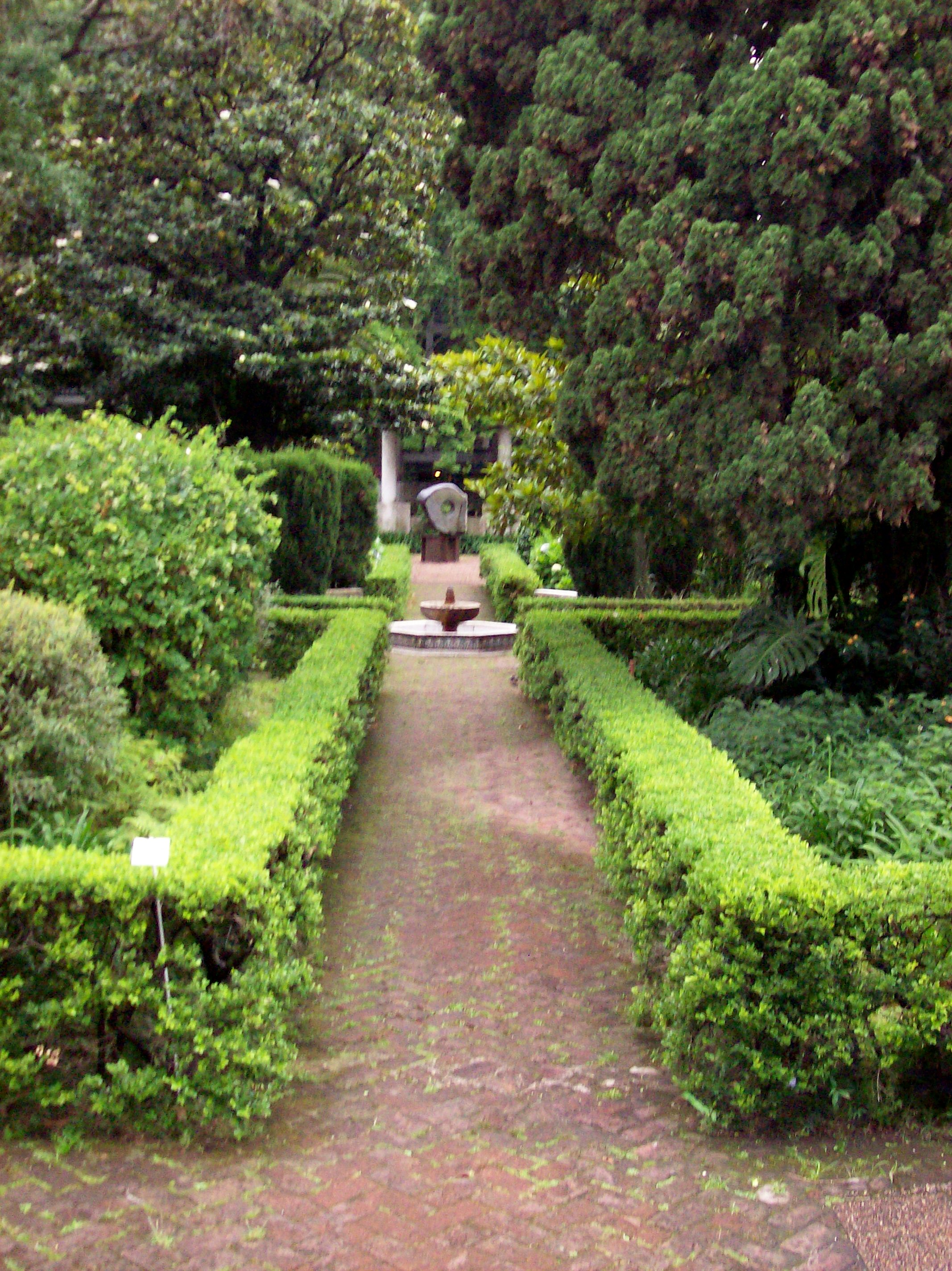

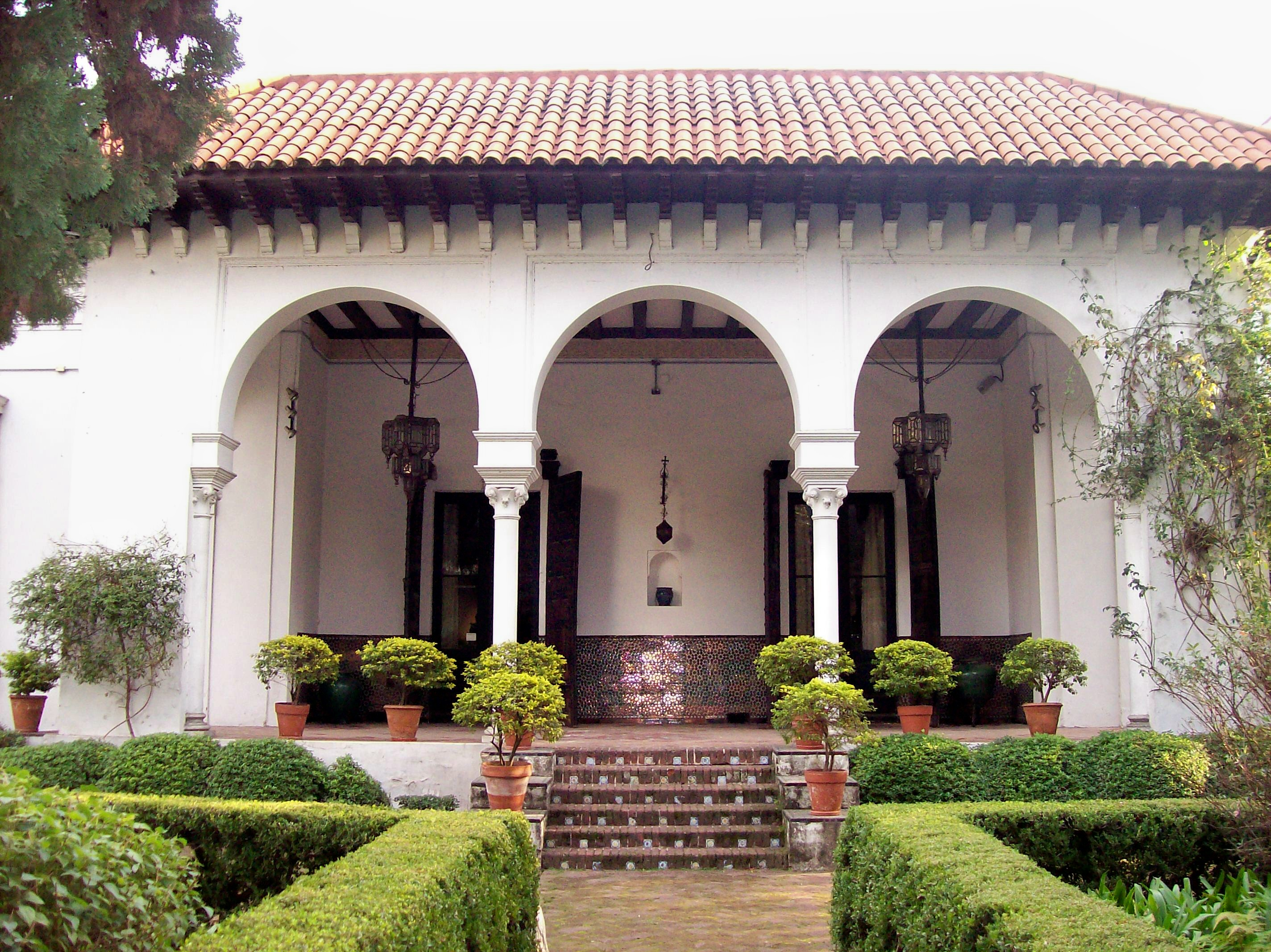

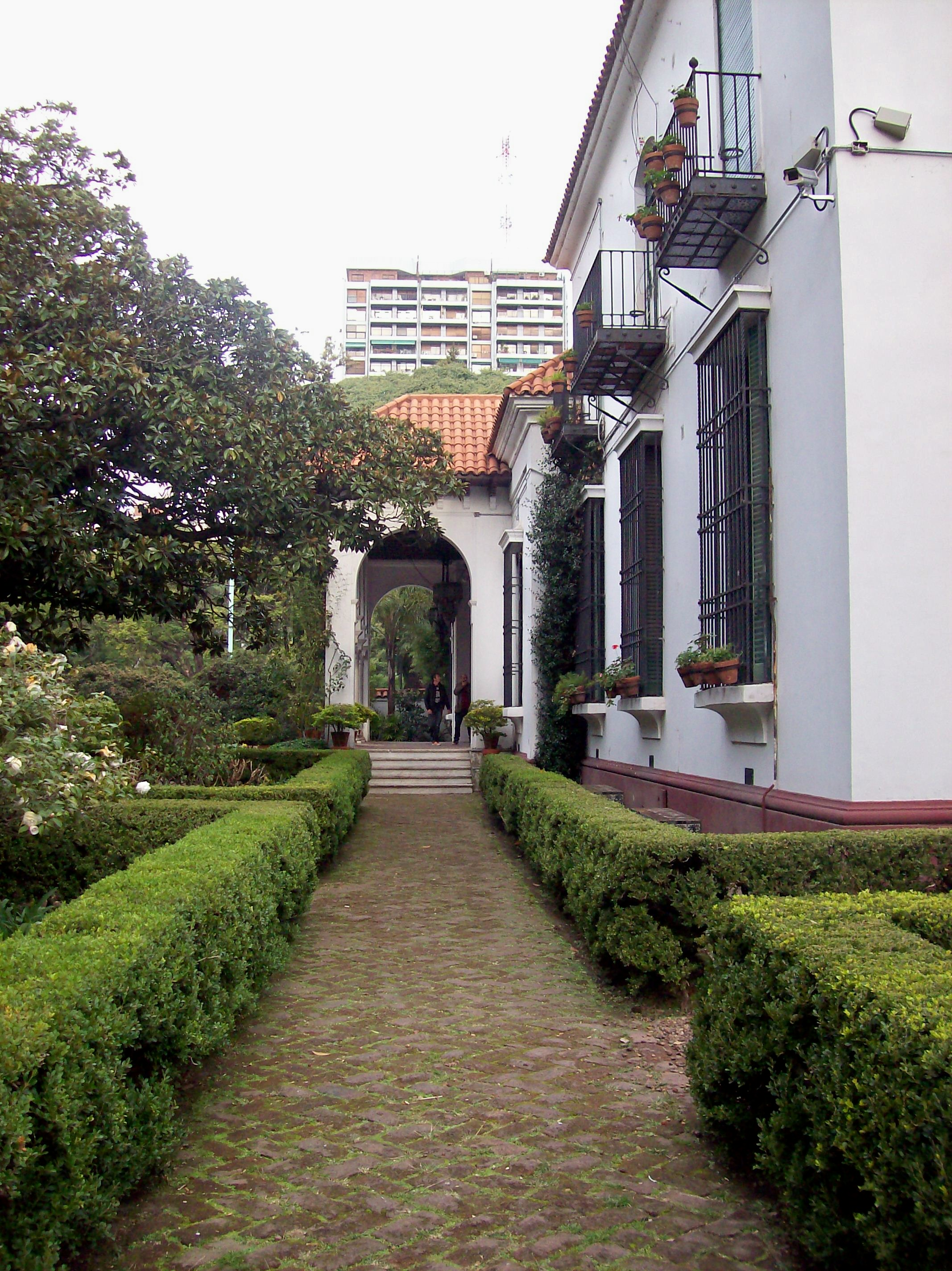

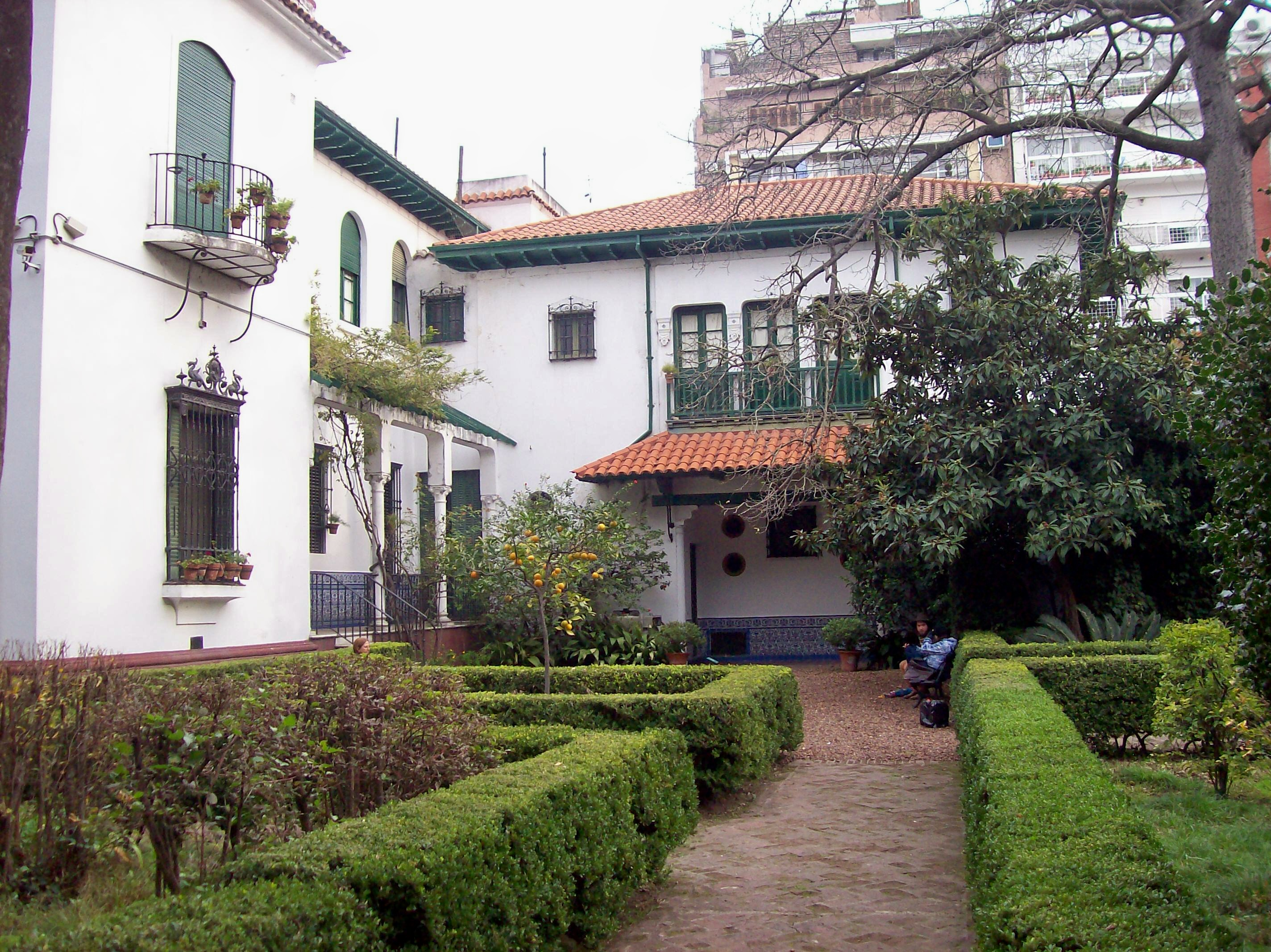

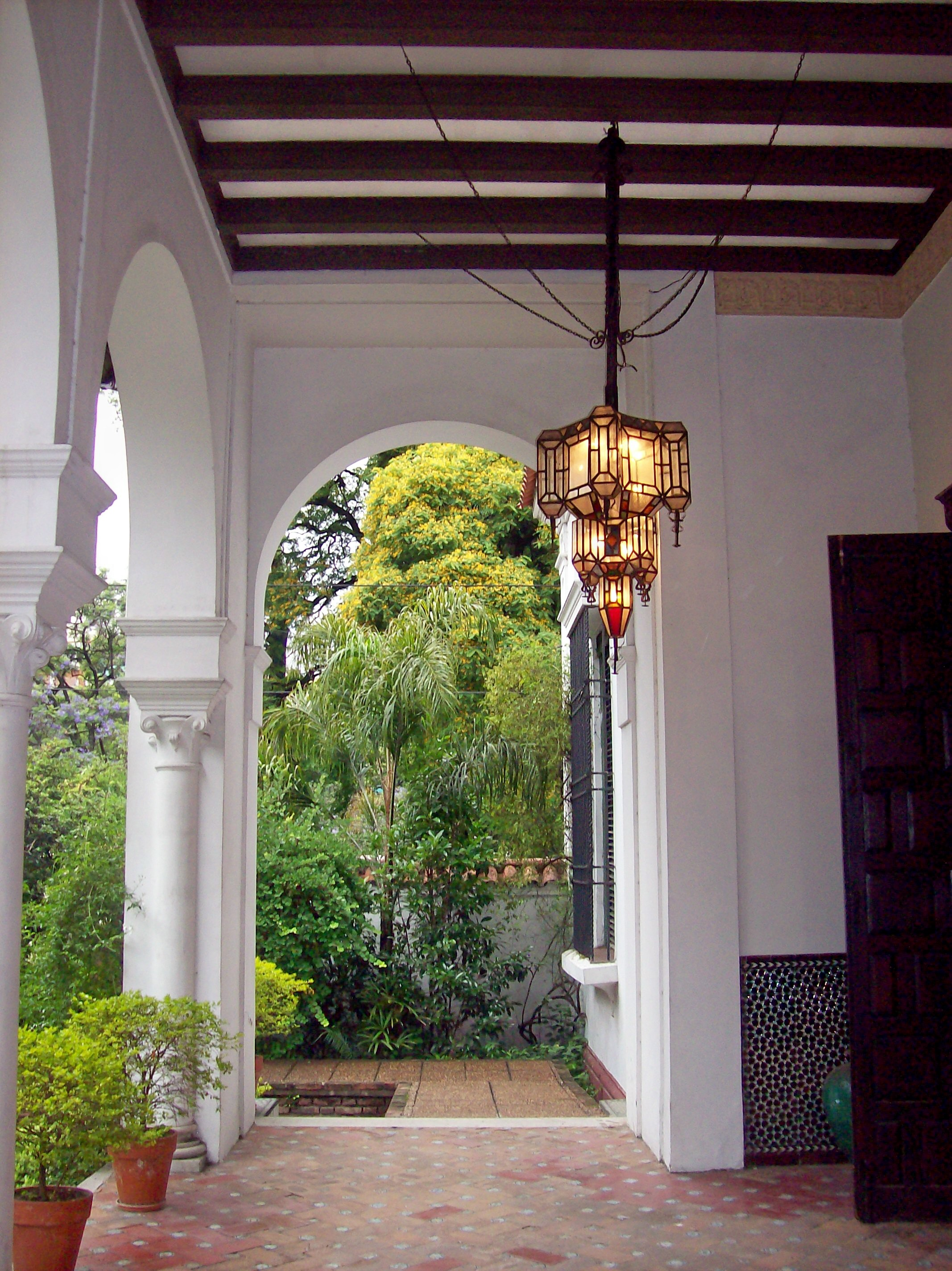
