= Sebastian Spreng =

American painter

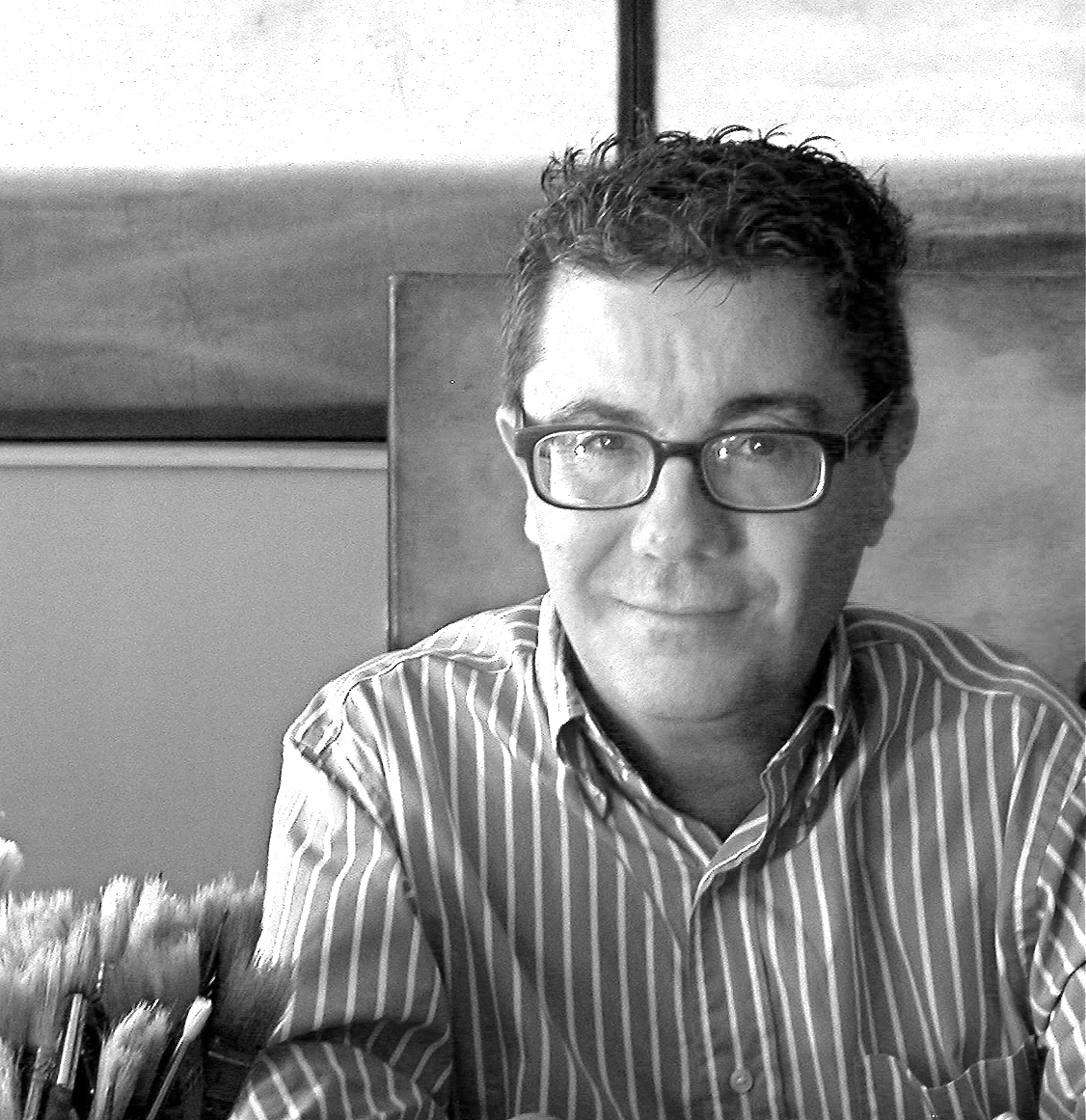
- Sebastian Spreng 2008
- Born: April 6, 1956 (age 70); Esperanza, Santa Fe, Argentina
- Known for: Painting, music, stage designer, opera, journalism, diarist

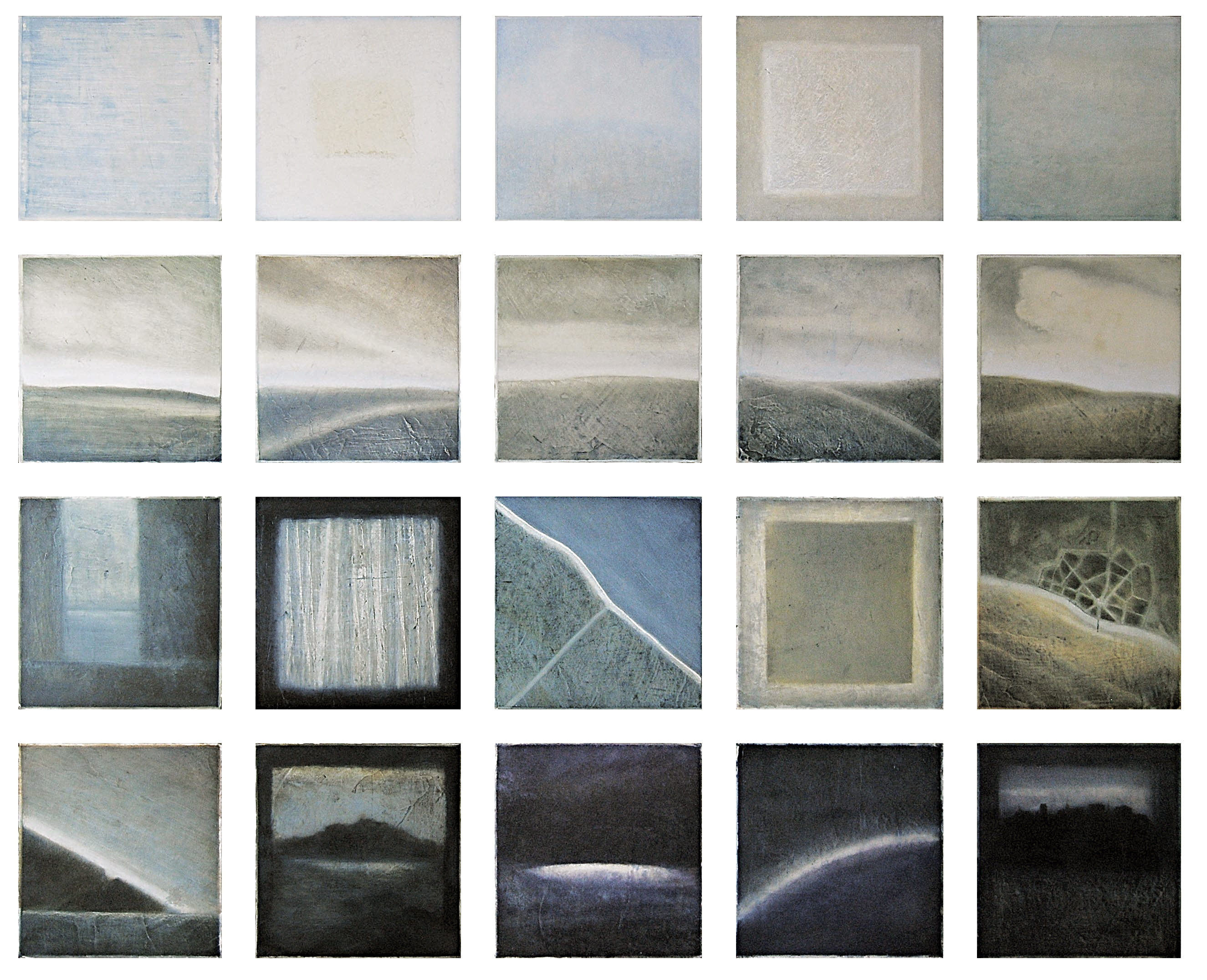
Delicate Balance Installation/Private Collection

Sebastian Spreng (born April 6, 1956) is an Argentine-born American visual artist and music journalist. He is a self-taught artist. He lives in Bay Harbor Islands, Florida.

== Biography ==
Sebastian Spreng was born on April 6, 1956, in Esperanza, Santa Fe in Argentina. In 1987, he settled in Miami, Florida and has been a vital presence in the Florida art scene.

His awards include the Hortt Competition at the Museum of Art Fort Lauderdale and the 1995 Personal Achievement Award from the Muscular Dystrophy Association for the State of Florida, since earlier childhood, Spreng suffers from muscular dystrophy.

In 1994, he was commissioned by Metro-Dade Art In Public Places to create a permanent exhibition at the Miami-Dade Government Center.

In 2012, he was selected as one of the "100 Latinos of Miami", along other personalities, and as the 2013 Visual Artist of the 11th Edition of the Music@Menlo Chamber Music Festival in Atherton, California.

Since 2015 he works in IPad drawings presenting exhibitions totally dedicated to digital art in Miami, Santa Fe, and Panama. The series Das Lied von der Erde, based in Gustav Mahler song cycle comprised more than twenty iPad drawings in several sizes.

In 2017 was named "Knight Champion of the Arts" by the John S. and James L. Knight Foundation and his works exhibited at the Knight Hall in the Adrienne Arsht Center for the Performing Arts.

At the Lowe Art Museum an exhibition about the destruction of Dresden consisting in iPad drawings printed on aluminum took place between March and September 2018.
