= Gastón Gori =

Argentine essayist and poet

Gastón Gori (1915–2004) was an Argentine essayist and poet.

== Works ==
- Anatole France - trial ( 1940 )
- Above ground bloodied (Sobre la tierra ensangrentada)- trial ( 1941 )
- While waiting for the dawn (Mientras llega la aurora) - Poems ( 1942 )
- Aimless lives ( Vidas sin rumbo) - stories ( 1943 )
- And was freckled (Y además era pecoso) - Tales ( 1945 )
- Surrender the nards (Se rinden los nardos) - Poems ( 1946 )
- Intermezzo of roses (Intermezzo de las rosas)- trial ( 1946 )
- Swiss Colonization in Argentina (Colonización suiza en argentina)- historical essay ( 1947 )
- The Indian, Creole and gringo ( El indio, el criollo y el gringo)- ethnographic studies ( 1947 )
- Colonization, historical and social study (Colonización, estudio histórico y social) - Tales ( 1948 )
- The path of otters (El camino de las nutrias)- Tales ( 1949 )
- He has spent the nostalgia ( Ha pasado la nostalgia) - Trials ( 1950 )
- Vague and poorly entertained (Vagos y mal entretenidos) - trial ( 1951 )
- The pampa without gaucho (La pampa sin gaucho) - trial ( 1952 )
- Settler families of San Carlos (Familias colonizadoras de san carlos)- History ( 1954 )
- Antonini's death ( La muerte de antonini) - novel ( 1956 )
- The bread and butter (El pan nuestro) - trial ( 1958 )
- The desert has an owner (El desierto tiene dueño) ( 1958 )
- Anibal Ponce - trial ( Anibal Ponce) ( 1958 )
- Journal settler Henry Vollenweider (Diario del colonizador Enrique Vollenweider)- ( 1958 )
- Eduardo Wilde - trial (Eduardo Wilde) ( 1962 )
- Immigration and colonization in Argentina (Inmigración y colonización en Argentina)- trial ( 1964 )
- The Forest quebracho tragedy (La Forestal, tragedia del quebracho colorado)- trial ( 1965 )
- Hope mother colony (Esperanza, madre de colonias)- trial ( 1969 )
- The narrative in the Coastal region ( La narrativa en la región del Litoral)- study ( 1971 )
- The foreign land, rural youth drama (La tierra ajena, drama de la juventud agraria)- trial ( 1972 )
- Colony founding families of Hope (Familias fundadoras de la colonia Esperanza)- ( 1973 )
- Poems in the Storm (Poemas en la tormenta) ( 1975 )
- Words of joyful rebuttal (Palabras de refutación gozosa)- Stories ( 1976 )
- Nicanor and the raging waters (Nicanor y las aguas furiosas)- Stories ( 1976 )
- Mr. Phantom Pass (Pase señor fantasma)- Tales ( 1976 )
