= Wolfgang Lüder =

German judge and politician (1937–2013)

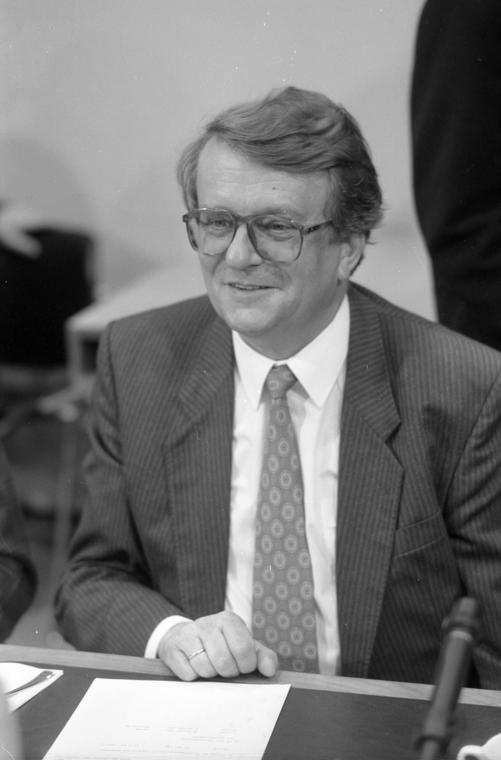
Wolfgang Lüder in 1991

Wolfgang Lüder (11 April 1937 – 19 August 2013) was a German lawyer and politician. He was a member of the Free Democratic Party (German: Freie Demokratische Partei, FDP).

He served as the chairman of the Berlin branch of the FDP from 1971 to 1981, becoming from 1975 onwards the Berlin Secretary of Commerce and in 1976 he became the deputy of the Governing Mayor of Berlin. In 1987 he was elected to the Bundestag, where he served until 1994.

== Life ==
=== Early life and legal career ===
Lüder, the son of a landlord, was born in Celle in 1937. He was educated at the Celle Ernestinum grammar school. In 1957, he began studying for the bar at the Free University of Berlin. In 1961 he passed his first legal exam, becoming an intern at the Berlin Kammergericht. In 1970 he became the assistant to the State Attorney, and then a judge at the Landgericht Berlin.

In 1981, he returned to law once again and was also a notary from 1991 to 2007. Lüder was married three times and had one daughter. He remained active in politics in Berlin until his death at the age of 76 in 2013.

=== Early political career ===
In 1957, he became a member of the FDP students' branch, known as the Liberalen Studentenbund (LSD). He rose quickly through the party's hierarchy, becoming the head of the Berlin branch by 1961, and then the national chairman in 1962. He was also active in student politics, becoming the leader of the Free University's students' assembly in 1958. He took a leading role in those organisations in promoting the anti-nuclear movement, advocating for multilateral disarmament by both NATO and the Warsaw Pact.

Joining the FDP proper in 1962, by 1968 he had been put in charge of the Deutschen Jungdemokraten.

In 1970 Lüder became a member of the FDP's national executive. In May 1971 the West Berlin FDP elected him as their leader as he was the most prominent representative of the left-leaning wing of the party who was eligible for the role. Until 1979 he was regularly re-elected to this role.

In the 1975 West Berlin Elections he was made a member of the Berlin Senate for the economy and transport as part of the ruling SPD/FDP coalition. After the resignation of Berlin's deputy mayor Hermann Oxfort, Lüder replaced him as Klaus Schütz's deputy in July 1976, continuing to serve in the Senate under Dietrich Stobbe.

On the 7th of January 1981 he resigned in the wake of the Garski Affair, a scandal involving fellow FDP member Dietrich Garski.

=== Member of the Bundestag ===
In 1987, he was elected to the 11th German Bundestag by proportional representation, being re-elected in 1990 as a member of the FDP's national list. Following German reunification, he was accused, without evidence, of working for the Stasi.

=== Personal life and involvement with other organisations ===
Throughout his life, Lüder was a committed Humanist and member of the Humanistischer Verband Deutschlands and eventually became the head of their Berlin-Brandenburg chapter. He was also a member of the group Gegen Vergessen – Für Demokratie, the Karl Hamann trust and the German-Taiwanese Friendship Society. In 1980 he was awarded the Ordre national du Mérite by the French government and in 2012 he was given the honorary title of Stadtältester by the Berlin senate.
