= Fernando Paillet =

Argentine photographer

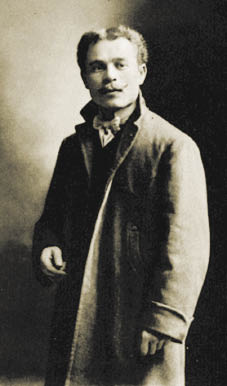
- Paillet's self portrait, c. 1920
- Born: Fernando Basilio Paillet; October 27, 1880; Esperanza, Santa Fe, Argentina
- Died: November 3, 1967 (aged 87); Esperanza, Santa Fe, Argentina

Fernando Paillet (27 October 1880 – 3 November 1967), was an Argentine photographer. He portrayed the colonisation and life of the settlers in Esperanza, an agricultural colony founded in 1856 in Santa Fe Province. Paillet defined himself as a "provincial photographer that recorded the pampa gringa".

Paillet is one of the most notable photographers of the first half of the 20th century.

== Early life ==
Paillet was the son of Clotilde Insinger, granddaughter of Peter Zimmerman, the first colony that died in Esperanza. Paillet started photography while young, becoming an employee of the Lutser studio of Santa Fe in 1898. In 1899 Paillet acquired his first camera, a Widmayer, and returned to his hometown.

== Career ==
At the beginning of the twentieth century he worked as a photographer in Esperanza. He opened a studio in 1902, continuing until 1950. Paillet became the city's most renowned photographer, recording its traditions and landscapes. He interacted with including majors, police chiefs, judges, ladies of charity and other anonymous personalities.

Their hardiness seems an extreme way of fineness today. Bucolic, gallant, laborious, agricultural, metallurgic scenes; all of them take us to lost tabernacles where the history of the Argentine colonization lays today. The history of crafts, the history of the familiar romance and the history of photography itself".|Horacio González, director of National Library of Argentina

Paillet was also a painter, violinist and directed the chorus of the Singing Society. He wrote four songs that included a tango, a waltz, and a theatre play.

In 1948 Esperanza contracted with Paillet for a historic and art museum. He started with his nephew Rogelio Imhoff, producing many images. The project was never carried out, which triggered depression in Paillet. As a result, he destroyed 80% of the photographs. Only about 200 were preserved.

Due to progressive deafness, Paillet spent his last years with small activities. He died in 1967.

== Books ==
- Fernando Paillet: Fotografías 1894–1940, published by Fundación Antorchas, 2015
