= Lueders =

Lueders or Lüders is a surname, and may refer to:

- Alexander von Lüders (1790–1874), Russian general
- Gerhart Lüders (1920–1995), German theoretical physicist
- Heinrich Lüders (1869–1943), German Orientalist and Indologist
- Jack Lueders-Booth (born 1935), American photographer
- Karen Lueders, American politician
- Kathy Lueders, American engineer and business manager
- Lauren Lueders (born 1987), American basketball player
- Marie Elisabeth Lüders (1878–1966), German politician and women's rights activist
- Michael Lüders (born 1959), German political scientist, Islamic scholar and author
- Pierre Lueders (born 1970), Canadian Olympic, world and World Cup champion bobsledder

== See also ==
- Lueders, Texas
- Lüders band in metals
- Luders Affair in Haiti, 1897
- Lüder, Germany
