= Héctor Borla =

Argentinean artist (1937–2002)

Hector Borla (May 6, 1937 – January 11, 2002) he was an Argentinean painter and illustrator. Born in Esperanza, Santa Fe, Argentina, he obtained notoriety with his series of oil paintings devoted to Butterflies, Postal-stamps, Henry VIII Wives and exhibited in Buenos Aires, London, Dallas, México and Miami.

He died in Buenos Aires, Argentina.

In tribute, the museum of art in his native city of Esperanza was renamed Hector Borla.
