= Superclásico =

Football rivalry between River Plate and Boca Juniors

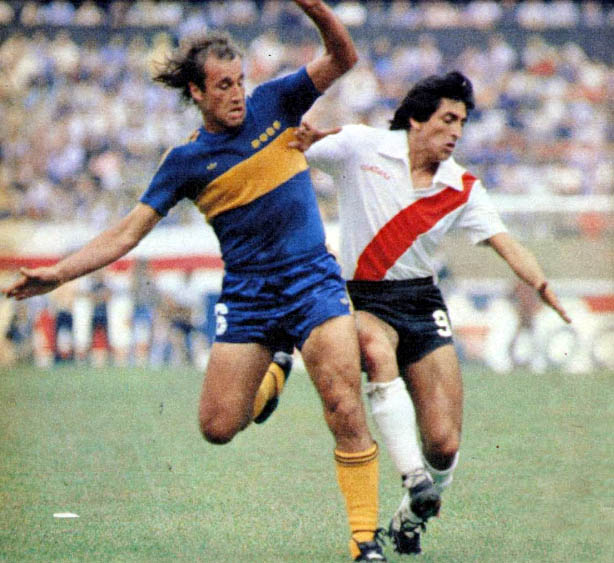
- Roberto Mouzo (Boca) and Ramón Díaz (River) during a Superclásico in 1981

- Boca Juniors River Plate
- Location: Buenos Aires, Argentina
- First meeting: 24 Aug 1913; Primera División; River Plate 2-1 Boca Juniors
- Latest meeting: 1 November 2026; 2026 Clausura; Boca Juniors 1-0 River Plate
- Stadiums: Estadio Alberto José Armando (Boca Juniors); Estadio Monumental (River Plate)

Statistics
- Total meetings: 268
- Most wins: Boca Juniors (95)
- Most player appearances: Reinaldo Merlo (42 matches)
- Top scorer: Angel Labruna (16 goals)
- All-time series: Boca Juniors: 95; Draw: 84; River Plate: 88
- Largest victory: Boca Juniors 6-0 River Plate (23 December 1928); River Plate 5-1 Boca Juniors (19 October 1941)

The Superclásico (Superderby) is the football match in Argentina between Buenos Aires rivals River Plate and Boca Juniors. It derives from the Spanish usage of "clásico" to mean derby, with the prefix "super" used as the two clubs are the most popular and successful clubs in Argentine football. In fact, the term 'Clásico' originated in Argentina, particularly with this match up and it was later exported to other countries such as Spain and Mexico. According to some statistics, they command more than 70% of all Argentine football fans between them.

The Superclásico is known worldwide as one of the fiercest and most important derbies. In April 2004, the English newspaper The Observer put the Superclásico at the top of their list of "50 sporting things you must do before you die", saying that "Derby day in Buenos Aires makes the Old Firm game look like a primary school kick-about", and in 2016 the British football magazine FourFourTwo considered it the "biggest derby in the world". That same year The Daily Telegraph ranked this match as the "biggest club rivalry in world football", and the Daily Mirror placed it number one in the top 50 football derbies in the world, above El Clásico between Barcelona and Real Madrid, in 2017.

== History ==
=== Origins and background ===
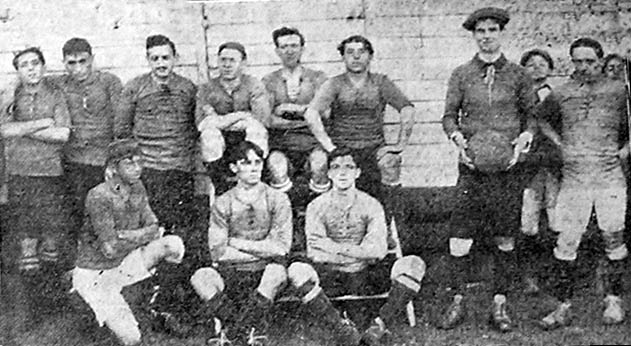
Boca Juniors starting line-up for the first official Superclásico, 1913

The two clubs Boca and River Plate both have origins in La Boca, the working class dockland area of Buenos Aires, with River being founded in 1901 and Boca in 1905. River, however, moved to the affluent district of Núñez in the north of the city in 1925. Since then, Boca Juniors has been known as the club of Argentina's working class or the people's club, with many Boca fans coming from the local Italian immigrant community. Boca fans are actually known as "Xeneizes" ("Genoese"). By contrast, River Plate became known by the nickname, Los Millonarios (The Millionaires), with a supposedly upper-class support base. Both clubs, however, have supporters from all social classes.

By 1913, both clubs had their fields in La Boca and had not won any league, being also far away from the popularity that would come after. The most known Argentine football rivalry until then had been Alumni–Belgrano A.C. (both clubs from Belgrano) until Alumni disbanded in 1911 and Belgrano disaffiliated from the AFA. Racing Club de Avellaneda became the first of the Big Five when that same year won the first of their seven consecutive league titles.

Before their first official match, Boca and River had played two friendlies (1908 and 1912). River Plate's nickname was Darseneros (the most popular Millonarios came in 1931). The first official match of the rivalry, the 1913 Superclásico, was played on August 24, 1913 at Racing Club Stadium, with River winning 2–1. 7,000 spectators attended the match, and goals were scored by Cándido García and Antonio Ameal Pereyra (River) and Marcos Meyer (Boca).

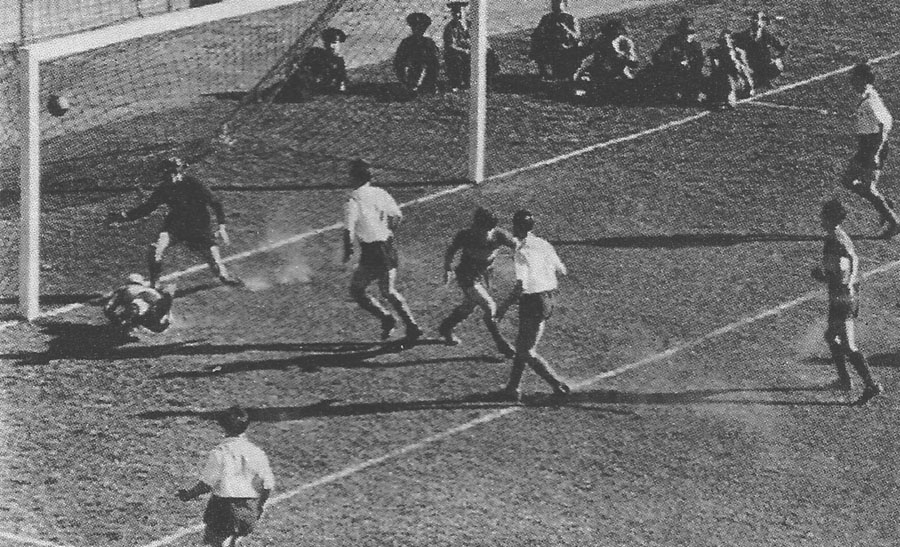
The palomita goal scored by Severino Varela in 1943 became legendary

The Superclásico is particularly noted for the passion of the fans, with what the BBC describe as "a sea of colourful flowing banners, screams and roars, chanting, dancing and never-ending fireworks". Both sets of supporters sing passionate chants aimed at their rivals, often based on popular Argentine rock band tunes. Each stadium, Boca's La Bombonera and River's El Monumental are known to bounce with the simultaneous jumping of the fans. At times, the matches have been known to end in fights between the "barra brava" (violent factions) of both sides or with the police.

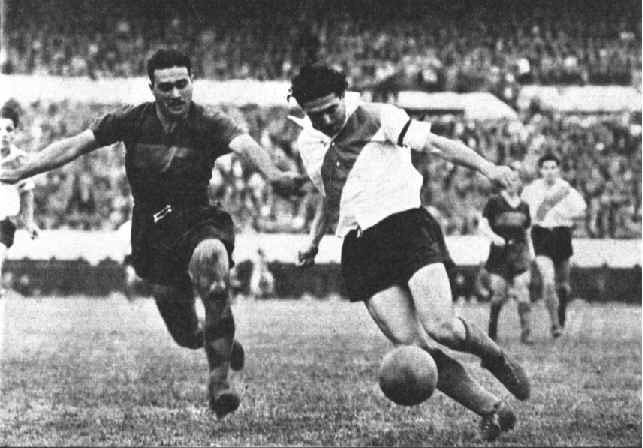
Angel Labruna dribbling in a 1950 match

Boca fans refer to River supporters as "gallinas" ("chickens") claiming the lack of guts of River players. Despite the fact that their club traces back its roots to La Boca, River fans refer to their Boca rivals as "los chanchitos" ("little pigs") because they claim their stadium, located in the less affluent La Boca area, smells most of the time, as well as "bosteros" ("manure collectors"), a reference to the smell of a polluted river in La Boca. Another infamous slur, coined in the late 1990s over remarks of Boca's forward Diego Latorre, is to brand Boca Juniors as "The Cabaret", due to the alleged aspiration of some players to steal the limelight.

The rivalry between the two clubs can also affect players, particularly those who are transferred between the two clubs. Cataldo Spitale was the first to make the change, when he left Boca to sign for River in 1933. Oscar Ruggeri, who moved to River from Boca in 1985 said, "It's not easy I can tell you. One side looks on you as a traitor and the other doesn't really trust you. You need time to adapt and a lot of character to win people over." Some players have gone so far as to state that they would not play for the other club such as River's Uruguayan player Enzo Francescoli while Diego Maradona during his time playing for Argentinos Juniors, refused to even consider a move to El Monumental, stating that his dream was to play for Boca. In 1992, José Luis Villarreal won the league title with Boca, and left the following year to River. Although he was received very well by River fans, and won the 1993 and 1994 league titles there, Boca fans never forgave him, and he says he hasn't been to La Bombonera since then to avoid problems.

Recently, on March 21 in the Clausura 2010 tournament, the two teams started playing in La Bombonera. In the ninth minute of play, the match was suspended because of heavy rainfall in Buenos Aires. The pitch was practically flooded, but in spite of this, referee Héctor Baldassi stated that the match could be played. In the course of the match, the two teams were unable to keep possession because the ball became repeatedly bogged down. The match restarted four days later, on March 25, and was played with two halves of 41 minutes. This was the first Superclásico suspended in history.

=== Puerta 12 tragedy ===
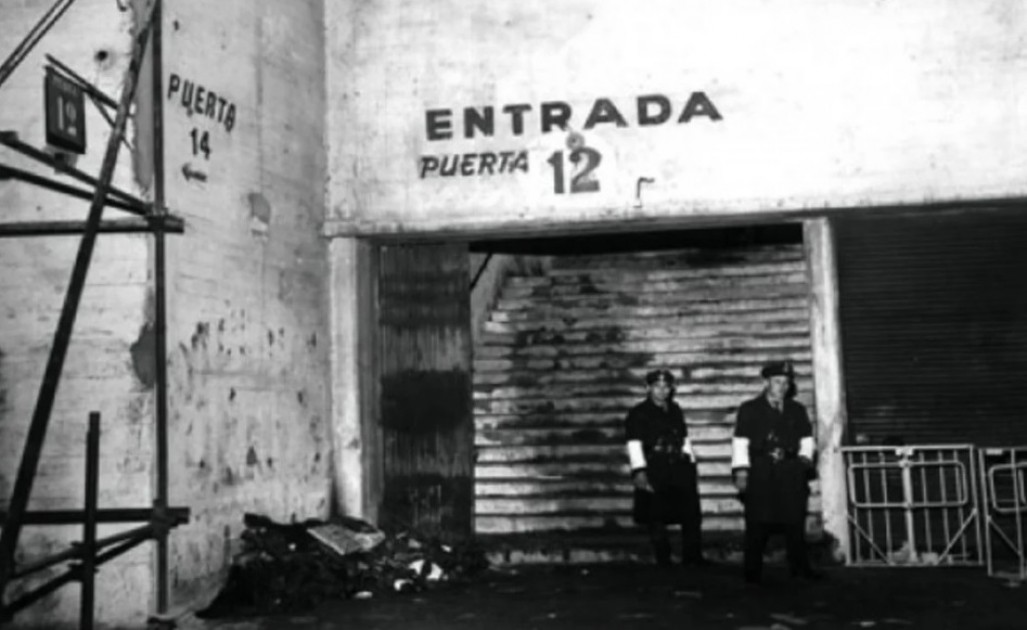
Gate 12, under custody, the day after the tragedy

On June 23, 1968, in El Monumental, after a 0–0 match between the two teams, 71 fans were killed in a crush at gate 12, with 150 fans left injured. The disaster was the worst incident in the history of Argentine football and the majority of the dead were teenagers and young adults; the average age of the victims was 19. There are various claims as to what exactly happened that day. Some claim that the disaster happened after Boca Juniors fans threw burning River flags from the upper tiers of the stadium, causing a stampede of their own fans in the lower tier.

Others claim that it happened after River fans arrived at the Boca section, causing the stampede of the visiting fans. Yet others claim that gate 12 was locked, or would not open at the time, and that the fans at the back did not hear the ones at the front telling them to stop coming in. William Kent, River's former president, claimed that the police were the culprits, as they began repressing Boca fans after they had thrown urine at them from the stands. Some witnesses claim that the turnstiles to the exit were blocked by a huge iron pole.

After three years of investigation, a government inquiry found no one guilty, much to the disappointment of the families of the victims. Since the tragedy, the gates at El Monumental have been identified by letters instead of numbers.

At the end of the 1968 season, the 68 football clubs in the Argentine Football Association collected 100,000 pesos for the families of the deceased.

=== River's 2011 relegation to 2018 Greater Final ===
Since the turn of the century, the rivalry has intensified to different levels. A series of fierce meetings and violent events rekindled international attention to the derby.

Boca eliminated River in the 2000 Copa Libertadores and 2004 Copa Libertadores, winning the title in 2000, 2001 and 2003, and reaching the finals in 2004. Moreover, in June 2011, River was relegated for the first time in its history.

Since its promotion in 2012, River eliminated Boca in the 2014 Copa Sudamericana, 2015 Copa Libertadores, 2017 Supercopa Argentina, 2018 Copa Libertadores, and the 2019 Copa Libertadores, lifting the trophy on all of those occasions, except the 2019 Copa Libertadores.

During the 2015 Copa Libertadores Round of 16, River Plate players were attacked at half time by a Boca fan that used pepper spray as the players were entering the dressing rooms. As a result, the game was suspended and CONMEBOL opened disciplinary proceedings on Boca. At the time of the attack, River was winning the series 1–0. As a result of the incident, Boca were disqualified from competition in the tournament and were faced with sanctions imposed by CONMEBOL. River Plate, on the other hand, advanced to the quarterfinals and would later go on to win the Copa Libertadores.

In the 2018 Copa Libertadores Finals, the bus carrying Boca's players to the El Monumental was attacked by River fans who threw large objects after the police withdrew from the zone. The game was suspended and despite Boca's requests to have River disqualified, the game was moved to Madrid at the Santiago Bernabéu Stadium. After drawing 2–2 at La Bombonera and losing its home field advantage, River famously won the game 3–1 after extra time (5–3 on aggregate). Through the series, Boca was always ahead until the extra time of the return leg. Given the rivalry and the stage, and the fact of having been played in Europe, the 2018 Copa Libertadores Finals gathered unusual attention outside South America.

== Statistics ==
=== Overall record ===
As of 1 November 2026. Only official matches are included.

Type	Competition	Games played	Boca wins	Draws	River wins	Boca goals	River goals
League	Primera División	218	81	65	73	295	277
League	Total (league)	218	81	65	73	296	277
National cups	Copa Competencia Jockey Club	3	0	1	2	3	6
National cups	Copa Centenario de la AFA	2	0	1	1	0	1
National cups	Copa Adrián Escobar (Note: Both clubs only played a semifinal in the 1942 edition. After the match ended 0–0, River qualified to the finals by corner kicks awarded, according to the competition rules.)	1	0	1	0	0	0
National cups	Copa de Competencia Británica	1	1	0	0	2	0
National cups	Supercopa Argentina	1	0	0	1	0	2
National cups	Copa de la Liga Profesional	5	2	3	1	8	8
National cups	Copa Argentina	1	0	1	0	0	0
National cups	Total (national cups)	16	3	8	5	14	18
CONMEBOL competitions	Copa Libertadores (Note: In the 2004 edition, River won the second leg 2–1 (so it was listed as a won game). After the series ended 2–2 in goals, Boca qualified to play the finals after a penalty shoot-out.)	28	11	8	9	32	26
CONMEBOL competitions	Copa Sudamericana	2	0	1	1	0	1
CONMEBOL competitions	Supercopa Libertadores (Note: In the 1994 edition and after the series ended 0–0 in goals, Boca qualified by penalty shoot-out.)	2	0	2	0	1	1
CONMEBOL competitions	Total (CONMEBOL)	32	11	11	10	33	28
Total (official matches)		266	95	84	88	343	323

=== Primera División matches ===
Includes only matches in the Primera División since their first official game in 1913.

#	Season	Date	Venue	Winner	Score	Goals (home team)	Goals (away team)
1	1913	24 Aug	Racing (Note: River was the home team.)	**River**	2–1	Mayer (70)	C. García (23), Ameal Pereyra (47)
2	1914	25 Oct	Ferro	(Draw)	0–0		
3	1915	20 Jun	Boca	**River**	2–0		Penney (15, 79)
4	1916	10 Dec	Racing	**River**	2–1	Risso (25), Chiappe (p. 75)	Reppeto (78)
5	1917	24 Jun	Racing	(Draw)	2–2	Taggino (24, 70)	Amores (30, 83)
6	1918	18 Sep	Racing	**Boca**	1–0		Brichetto (67)
– (Note: Some historians do not include this match due to the championship was annulled, prior the creation of dissident Asociación Amateurs de Football, with River Plate being one of the teams that joined the new league (while Boca Juniors remained in the official body). As a result, the Superclásico would not be played until 1927 after both, official and dissident associations, merged.)	1919	27 Jul	Boca	(Draw)	0–0		
7	1927	4 Dec	Boca	**Boca**	1–0	Cherro (7)	
8	1928	23 Dec	Boca	**Boca**	6–0	Tarasconi (3, 40), Kuko (30, 55), Cherro (66, 78)	
9	1930	4 May	River	**River**	3–2	Ganduglia (23, 80), Locassio (34)	Tarasconi (10, 59)
10	1931	20 Sep	Boca	(Draw)	1–1	Varallo (30)	Peucelle (16)
11	1932	6 Jan	River	**Boca**	3–0		Alberino (20), Muttis (34), Varallo (42)
12	1932	19 Jun	River	(Draw)	1–1	Ferreyra (75)	Mariani (60)
13	1932	30 Oct	Boca	**Boca**	2–1	Benítez Cáceres (27, 82)	Ferreyra (52)
14	1933	2 Jul	Boca	(Draw)	1–1	Nardini (21)	Luna (42)
15	1933	19 Nov	River	**River**	3–1	Ferreyra (3, 15, 82)	Cuello (o.g. 47)
16	1934	17 Jun	Boca	**Boca**	4–1	Cusatti (15), Cherro (42), Sánchez (70, 73)	Ferreyra (66)
17	1934	16 Sep	River	**Boca**	1–0		Cherro (43)
18	1934	4 Nov	Boca	**Boca**	2–0	Varallo (17), B. Cáceres (56)	
19	1935	21 Apr	Boca	**Boca**	1–0	Cherro (5)	
20	1935	1 Sep	River	(Draw)	1–1	Rongo (21)	Varallo (11)
21	1936 (CH)	19 Apr	Boca	**River**	3–2	Cherro (51), B. Cáceres (64)	Peucelle (10), Ferreyra (21, 38)
22	1936 (CC)	30 Aug	River	**River**	2–1	Rongo (20), Moreno (50)	A. González (18)
23	1937	8 Aug	San Lorenzo (Note: Boca was the home team.)	**Boca**	2–1	Gonzales (25), Cherro (76)	Rongo (70)
24	1937	12 Dec	San Lorenzo	**River**	3–2	Deambrosi (12), Vaschetto (63), Ferreyra (72)	Fatecchi (o.g. 42), Careri (64)
25	1938	10 Apr	Boca	**River**	1–2	Careri (p. 15)	Vaschetto (63), Moreno (68)
26	1938	4 Sept	River	(Draw)	2–2	Rongo (17, 61)	Benítez (51, 74)
27	1939	11 Feb	San Lorenzo	**River**	3–5	Lizhterman (55, 56, 60)	Rongo (36, 40), Vaschetto (67, 80), Pedernera (82)
28	1939	11 Jun	River	**Boca**	2–0		Picaro (16), Varallo (35)
29	1939	5 Nov	San Lorenzo	**River**	2–1	Varallo (14)	Blanco (17), Labruna (76)
30	1940	30 Jun	Boca	**Boca**	3–1	Rosell (7), Sarlanga (54), Alarcón (70)	D'Alessandro (16)
31	1940	17 Nov	River	(Draw)	1–1	Labruna (7)	Tenorio (50)
32	1941	29 Jun	Boca	**Boca**	2–1	Emeal (2), Valsecchi (80)	D'Alessandro (86)
33	1941	19 Oct	River	**River**	5–1	Labruna (11), Moreno (39), Deambrosi (43, 56), Pedernera (75)	Boyé (89)
34	1942	19 Jul	River	**River**	4–0	Deambrosi (21), Moreno (69), Labruna (46, 71)	
35	1942	8 Nov	Boca	(Draw)	2–2	Gandulla (26, 44)	Pedernera (47, 81)
36	1943	16 May	River	**River**	3–1	Labruna (5, 75), Muñoz (10)	Varela (35)
37	1943	26 Sep	Boca	**Boca**	2–1	Varela (20, 48)	Loustau (12)
38	1944	14 May	Boca	(Draw)	1–1	Varela (16)	Pedernera (46)
39	1944	3 Sep	River	**Boca**	0–1		Varela (43)
40	1945	29 Jul	River	**River**	1–0	Loustau (55)	
41	1945	18 Nov	Boca	**Boca**	4–1	Corcuera (23), Boyé (35, 67), Sarlanga (88)	Ramos (25)
42	1946	30 Jun	River	**River**	2–0	Loustau (32, 64)	
43	1946	27 Oct	Boca	**Boca**	2–0	Sosa (61), Boyé (71)	
44	1947	27 Apr	Boca	**Boca**	2–0	Boyé (52), Ricagni (88)	
45	1947	24 Aug	River	**River**	2–1	Labruna (66), Reyes (68)	Ricagni (6)
46	1948	1 Aug	Boca	**River**	2–1	Sánchez (9)	Labruna (30), Reyes (60)
47	1948	8 Dec	River	(Draw)	1–1	Latanzio (59)	Garfagnoli (73)
48	1949	31 Jul	River	**River**	1–0	Labruna (50)	
49	1949	13 Nov	Boca	**Boca**	2–0	Benitez (39), Busico (47)	
50	1950	11 Jun	River	**River**	1–0	Barbeito (30)	
51	1950	12 Oct	Boca	**River**	2–1	Campana (54)	Labruna (22), W. Gómez (25)
52	1951	15 Jul	River	**River**	1–0	Labruna (58)	
53	1951	1 Nov	Boca	**River**	3–0		W. Gómez (2), Vernazza (5, p. 65)
54	1952	8 Jun	Boca	**Boca**	2–1	Pérez (o.g. 16), González (p. 58)	Acosta (o.g. 44)
55	1952	8 Nov	River	**River**	3–1	Loustau (38), W. Gómez (42, 44)	Borello (84)
56	1953	19 Jul	River	**Boca**	3–2	Mouriño (o.g. 11), Loustau (72)	Montaño (7), Navarro (83), Rolando (86)
57	1953	1 Nov	Boca	**Boca**	1–0	Marcarián (24)	
58	1954	18 Jul	Boca	**River**	1–0		Prado (87)
59	1954	31 Oct	River	**River**	3–0	Labruna (14, 49), W. Gómez (75)	
60	1955	17 Aug	Racing	**Boca**	4–0		Pizzuti (14) Navarro (28, 40), Cucchiaroni (81)
61	1955	8 Dec	Boca	**River**	2–1	Etcheverry (10)	Labruna (74), Zárate (75)
62	1956	22 Apr	River	**River**	2–1	Zárate (p. 23), Labruna (60)	Angelillo (41)
63	1956	9 Sep	Boca	**Boca**	2–1	Zubeldía (20), Senes (31)	Vernazza (35)
64	1957	21 Jul	Boca	(Draw)	2–2	Senes (39), Mansilla (74)	Menéndez (20), Bourgoing (58)
65	1957	24 Nov	River	**River**	5–3	Menéndez (1), Zárate (16, 60, p. 70), Rodríguez (58)	Biaggio (8, 84), Rodríguez (21)
66	1958	28 Sep	River	(Draw)	2–2	E. Onega (38), Menéndez (88)	Nardiello (10), Ambrois (56)
67	1958	20 Dec	Huracán	(Draw)	2–2	Mansilla (6), Rodríguez (69)	Nuín (38), Menéndez (66)
68	1959	19 May	Boca	**Boca**	5–1	Nardiello (18), Yúdica (27, 46), Rodríguez (37), Mansilla (69)	Rodríguez (20)
69	1959	6 Sep	River	**Boca**	3–2	Melón (20), Nuín (p. 28)	Yúdica (41), Rodríguez (57), Nardiello (65)
70	1960	17 Apr	River	(Draw)	1–1	Paulinho (p. 68)	Mansilla (38)
71	1960	11 Sep	Boca	**Boca**	3–1	Valentim (12, 66), Yúdica (57)	Menéndez (72)
72	1961	6 Aug	River	(Draw)	2–2	Moacir (22), Pepillo (83)	Benítez (11), Valentim (24)
73	1961	12 Nov	Boca	**Boca**	3–1	Valentim (26, 42, 85)	Delém (34)
74	1962	26 Aug	River	**River**	3–1	Artime (50, 52), Delem (53)	Valentim (25)
75	1962	9 Dec	Boca	**Boca**	1–0	Valentim (p. 14)	
76	1963	28 Jul	Boca	**Boca**	2–0	Valentim (31, p. 75)	
77	1963	17 Nov	River	**Boca**	1–0	Sanfilippo (13)	
78	1964	16 Aug	River	(Draw)	0–0		
79	1964	29 Nov	Boca	(Draw)	1–1	Menéndez (66)	Artime (11)
80	1965	4 July	River	**Boca**	2–1	Cubilla (82)	Moraes (75), Pianetti (77)
81	1965	8 Dec	Boca	**Boca**	2–1	Pianetti (49), Menéndez (87)	Artime (9)
82	1966	3 Apr	Boca	**River**	3–1	A.H. Rojas (60)	Mas (34, 49), E. Onega (85)
83	1966	21 Aug	River	**River**	2–0	Mas (10), D. Onega (80)	
84	1967 Met	23 Apr	Boca	(Draw)	0–0		
85	1967 Met	8 Jul	River	**River**	1–0	Bayo (48)	
86	1967 Nac	26 Nov	River	**Boca**	1–0		Novello (54)
87	1968 Met	7 Apr	Boca	(Draw)	1–1	Pardo (44)	Matosas (p. 67)
88	1968 Met	23 Jun	River	(Draw)	0–0		
89	1968 Nac	27 Oct	Boca	**Boca**	3–1	A.H. Rojas (42), Pianetti (66, 79)	Mas (p. 89)
90	1969 Met	2 Mar	Boca	(Draw)	1–1	Cabrera (82)	Recio (2)
91	1969 Met	4 May	River	**River**	2–0	D. Onega (3), Más (85)	
92	1969 Met	3 Jul	Racing	(Draw)	0–0		
93	1969 Nac	14 Dec	River	(Draw)	2–2	Mas (38), Marchetti (67)	Madurga (12, 35)
94	1970 Met	14 Jun	Boca	**Boca**	1–0	Suñé (p. 80)	
95	1970 Nac	27 Sep	River	**River**	2–1	Mas (12, 27)	Pena (54)
96	1970 Nac	14 Nov	Boca	(Draw)	0–0		
97	1971 Met	10 Mar	Racing	**River**	1–2	Madurga (79)	J.J. López (14), Marchetti (45)
98	1971 Met	10 Jun	Racing	(Draw)	3–3	J.J. López (11), Mas (15), D. Onega (77)	Tarabini (47), A.C. Rojas (78, 87)
99	1971 Nac	27 Nov	Racing	**River**	1–3	Ponce (p. 24)	Martínez (21), J.J. López (51), Morete (76)
100	1972 Met	12 Mar	River	**Boca**	4–0		Ponce (18, 56), Curioni (55, 77)
101	1972 Met	18 Jun	Boca	(Draw)	2–2	Curioni (25), Potente (51)	Martínez (28), Scotta (61)
102	1972 Nac	15 Oct	Vélez	**River**	5–4	Curioni (24), Ponce (42), Potente (45, 51)	Mastrángelo (1), Mas (9, 57), Morete (62, 90)
103	1972 Nac	13 Dec	Vélez	**River**	3–2	Mastrángelo (32), Mouzo (o.g. 46), Morete (54)	Rogel (30), Curioni (74)
104	1973 Met	4 Mar	River	**River**	2–1	Alonso (p. 73), Mastrángelo (84)	Curioni (44)
105	1973 Met	27 Jun	Boca	**Boca**	5–2	Guerini (p. 35), Curioni (58), Potente (63), Ponce (79), Bertolotti (87)	Ghiso (30), J.J. López (89)
106	1973 Nac	11 Nov	Vélez	**River**	1–0	Morete (81)	
107	1974 Met	3 Feb	Boca	**Boca**	5–2	García Cambón (2, 37, 66, 71), Ferrero (p. 46)	Ghiso (16), Wolff (p. 61)
108	1974 Met	31 Mar	River	**River**	3–1	Morete (3, 30, p. 68)	Potente (26)
109	1974 Nac	25 Aug	Boca	**Boca**	1–0	García Cambón (32)	
110	1974 Nac	3 Nov	River	(Draw)	1–1	Mastrángelo (76)	Potente (72)
111	1975 Met	17 Apr	Boca	**River**	2–1	Trobbiani (p. 43)	Morete (6), Alonso (23)
112	1975 Met	27 Jul	River	**Boca**	1–0		Potente (70)
113	1975 Nac	21 Sep	Boca	**River**	2–1	Sánchez (87)	P.A. González (29), Luque (85)
114	1975 Nac	26 Oct	River	**Boca**	2–1	Más (68)	Sánchez (25), Alves (60)
115	1976 Met	18 Feb	River	(Draw)	0–0		
116	1976 Met	18 Apr	Boca	**River**	1–0	Perfumo (58)	
117	1976 Met	25 Jul	Huracán	(Draw)	1–1	Felman (p. 78)	Coudannes (53)
118	1976 Nac	26 Sep	Boca	(Draw)	1–1	Mastrángelo (20)	Passarella (p. 35)
119	1976 Nac	14 Nov	River	**Boca**	2–0		Mastrángelo (46), Felman (75)
120	1976 Nac	22 Dec	Racing	**Boca**	1–0	Suñé (72)	
121	1977 Met	14 Aug	Huracán	(Draw)	1–1	P.A. González (32)	Veglio (22)
122	1977 Met	9 Nov	Boca	**River**	1–2	Pernía (3)	Passarella (p. 45), P.A. González (88)
123	1978 Met	12 Jul	Boca	**Boca**	1–0	Husillos (12)	
124	1978 Met	15 Oct	River	**River**	1–0	O. Labruna (22)	
125	1979 Nac	23 Sep	River	(Draw)	1–1	Passarella (p. 44)	Randazzo (13)
126	1979 Nac	11 Nov	Boca	(Draw)	1–1	Husillos (76)	J.J. López (10)
127	1980 Met	2 Mar	Boca	**River**	5–2	Randazzo (23), Perotti (83)	R. Díaz (10, 78), Carrasco (46, 74), Ortiz (56)
128	1980 Met	15 Jun	River	**River**	2–1	Passarella (65), Luque (73)	Salinas (46)
129	1980 Nac	28 Sep	River	(Draw)	2–2	R. Díaz (8), Ortíz (54)	Outes (24), Pernía (80)
130	1980 Nac	6 Nov	Boca	**Boca**	1–0	Perotti (83)	
131	1981 Met	10 Apr	Boca	**Boca**	3–0	Brindisi (55, 60), Maradona (67)	
132	1981 Met	5 Jul	River	(Draw)	1–1	Kempes (65)	Maradona (55)
133	1981 Nac	27 Sep	Boca	**River**	3–2	Maradona (20), Gareca (82)	Kempes (64), Passarella (p. 68), J. García (80)
134	1981 Nac	1 Nov	River	(Draw)	2–2	J.J. López (5), Vieta (55)	Maradona (45, p. 90)
135	1982 Nac	7 Mar	River	**Boca**	5–1	Tevez (4)	Ruggeri (12), Gareca (30, 75), Córdoba (53, 56)
136	1982 Nac	25 Apr	Boca	(Draw)	0–0		
137	1982 Met	19 Sep	River	(Draw)	1–1	Mouzo (o.g. 42)	Gareca (56)
138	1982 Met	22 Dec	Boca	**River**	2–0	Vieta (67), Messina (85)	
139	1983 Met	5 Oct	River	**Boca**	2–1	Tapia (4)	Passucci (28), Stocco (85)
140	1983 Met	19 Oct	Vélez	**Boca**	1–0	Berta (55)	
141	1984 Met	24 Jun	River	(Draw)	1–1	Krasouski (39)	Stafuza (o.g. 61)
142	1984 Met	11 Nov	River	**River**	4–1	Alonso (55, 71), Francescoli (p. 74, p. 89)	Herrera (57)
143	1985–86	27 Oct	River	**River**	1–0	A. Montenegro (27)	
144	1985–86	6 Apr	Boca	**River**	2–0		Alonso (31, 85)
145	1986–87	2 Nov	Boca	**Boca**	1–0	Comas (72)	
146	1986–87	13 Apr	River	(Draw)	1–1	Alzamendi (16)	J. Rinaldi (62)
147	1987–88	22 Nov	River	**River**	3–2	J. Da Silva (59), Corti (62), Palma (86)	J. Rinaldi (42, 51)
148	1987–88	30 Apr	Boca	(Draw)	2–2	Graciani (27, 67)	Alzamendi (14), Ruggeri (75)
149	1988–89	18 Sep	River	**Boca**	2–0	Perazzo (77), Graciani (85)	
150	1988–89	5 Feb	Boca	**River**	0–0 (4–3 p)		
151	1988–89 L	19 Jul	River	(Draw)	0–0		
152	1988–89 L	24 July	Boca	(Draw)	0–0		
153	1988–89 L	27 July	Vélez	**River**	2–1	Marangoni (85)	Serrizuela (3), R. Centurión (57)
154	1989–90	6 Sep	Boca	**Boca**	1–0	Cuciuffo (53)	
155	1989–90	2 Feb	River	(Draw)	1–1	Zamora (44)	Latorre (53)
156	1990 Ap	23 Sep	River	**River**	2–0	J. Higuaín (27), R. Da Silva (62)	
157	1991 Cl	31 Mar	Boca	**Boca**	1–0	Latorre (74)	
158	1991 Ap	10 Nov	Boca	(Draw)	0–0		
159	1992 Cl	3 May	River	(Draw)	2–2	S. Berti (35), H. Díaz (57)	Latorre (2, 75)
160	1992 Ap	11 Oct	Boca	**Boca**	1–0	S. Martínez (48)	
161	1993 Cl	11 Apr	River	**Boca**	2–0	S. Martínez (8), A. Acosta (61)	
162	1993 Ap	17 Oct	River	**Boca**	1–0	A. Acosta (72)	
163	1994 Cl	30 Apr	Boca	**River**	2–0	Ortega (59), Crespo (85)	
164	1994 Ap	11 Dec	Boca	**River**	3–0		Francescoli (p. 14), Ortega (24), Gallardo (p. 70)
165	1995 Cl	18 Jun	River	**Boca**	4–2	Gamboa (o.g. 29), Francescoli (p. 89)	Saldaña (46), Márcico (48), Tchami (85), R. Da Silva (87)
166	1995 Ap	26 Nov	River	(Draw)	0–0		
167	1996 Cl	14 Jul	Boca	**Boca**	4–1	J. Basualdo (43), Caniggia (50, 66, 75)	Amato (87)
168	1996 Ap	29 Sep	Boca	**Boca**	3–2	Pompei (5), Cedrés (p. 60), Guerra (90)	Salas (21), Sorín (72)
169	1997 Cl	23 Mar	River	(Draw)	3–3	S. Berti (43), Villalba (77), C. Ayala (87)	Cedrés (5), S. Martínez (17, 29)
170	1997 Ap	25 Oct	River	**Boca**	2–1	S. Berti (40)	Toresani (47), Palermo (67)
171	1998 Cl	17 Apr	Boca	**Boca**	3–2	Caniggia (56), Palermo (69), Arruabarrena (72)	Solari (36), Salas (90)
172	1998 Ap	25 Oct	River	(Draw)	0–0		
173	1999 Cl	9 May	Boca	**Boca**	2–1	Bermúdez (21), Palermo (55)	Netto (p. 52)
174	1999 Ap	17 Oct	River	**River**	2–0	Aimar (37), Ángel (66)	
175	2000 Cl	14 May	Boca	(Draw)	1–1	Gmo. B. Schelotto (39)	Nelson Cuevas (77)
176	2000 Ap	15 Oct	River	(Draw)	1–1	Saviola (59)	Palermo (14)
177	2001 Cl	8 Apr	Boca	**Boca**	3–0	Ibarra (66), Riquelme (71), Gmo. B. Schelotto (p. 82)	
178	2001 Ap	16 Sep	River	(Draw)	1–1	Cambiasso (17)	Gaitán (83)
179	2002 Cl	10 Mar	Boca	**River**	0–3		Cambiasso (26), Coudet (41), R. Rojas (88)
180	2002 Ap	27 Oct	River	**Boca**	2–1	Fuertes (52)	Delgado (42, 77)
181	2003 Cl	1 Jun	Boca	(Draw)	2–2	Gmo. B. Schelotto (64, 71)	D'Alessandro (11), Cavenaghi (38)
182	2003 Ap	9 Nov	River	**Boca**	2–0		Battaglia (37), Iarley (52)
183	2004 Cl	16 May	Boca	**River**	1–0		Cavenaghi (37)
184	2004 Ap	7 Nov	River	**River**	2–0	G. Fernández (57), Cuevas (89)	
185	2005 Cl	22 May	Boca	**Boca**	2–1	Gmo. B. Schelotto (13), Delgado (81)	L. González (46)
186	2005 Ap	16 Oct	River	(Draw)	0–0		
187	2006 Cl	26 Mar	Boca	(Draw)	1–1	Palermo (p. 89)	Farías (38)
188	2006 Ap	8 Oct	River	**River**	3–1	Higuaín (29, 53), Farías (67)	Palacio (31)
189	2007 Cl	15 Apr	Boca	(Draw)	1–1	Ledesma (1)	Rosales (49)
190	2007 Ap	7 Oct	River	**River**	2–0	Falcao (23), Ortega (p. 31)	
191	2008 Cl	4 May	Boca	**Boca**	1–0	Battaglia (14)	
192	2008 Ap	19 Oct	River	**Boca**	1–0		Viatri (60)
193	2009 Cl	19 Apr	Boca	(Draw)	1–1	Palermo (58)	Gallardo (68)
194	2009 Ap	25 Oct	River	(Draw)	1–1	Gallardo (29)	Palermo (63)
195	2010 Cl	25 Mar	Boca	**Boca**	2–0	Medel (24, 59)	
196	2010 Ap	16 Nov	River	**River**	1–0	Maidana (53)	
197	2011 Cl	15 May	Boca	**Boca**	2–0	J.P. Carrizo (o.g. 28), Palermo (31)	
198	2012 In	28 Oct	River	(Draw)	2–2	Ponzio (1), Mora (70)	Silva (p. 75), Erviti (90+1)
199	2013 Fi	5 May	Boca	(Draw)	1–1	Silva (38)	Lanzini (43)
200	2013 In	6 Oct	River	**Boca**	1–0	Gigliotti (23)	
201	2014 Fi	30 Mar	Boca	**River**	1–2	Riquelme (67)	Lanzini (57), R. Funes Mori (85)
202	2014	5 Oct	River	(Draw)	1–1	Pezzella (78)	Magallán (22)
203	2015	3 May	Boca	**Boca**	2–0	Pavón (84), P. Pérez (86)	
204	2015	13 Sep	River	**Boca**	0–1	Lodeiro (18)	
205	2016	6 Mar	River	(Draw)	0–0		
206	2016	24 Apr	Boca	(Draw)	0–0		
207	2016–17	11 Dec	River	**Boca**	4–2	Driussi (33), Alario (39)	Bou (13), Tevez (61, 80), Centurión (90+3)
208	2016–17	14 May	Boca	**River**	3–1	Gago (45+2)	G. Martínez (14) Alario (23), Driussi (90)
209	2017–18	5 Nov	River	**Boca**	2–1	Ponzio (67)	Cardona (41), Nandez (71)
210	2018–19	23 Sep	Boca	**River**	0–2		G. Martínez (15), Scocco (69)
211	2019–20	1 Sep	River	(Draw)	0–0		
212	2021	3 Oct	River	**River**	2–1	J. Álvarez (25, 43)	Zambrano (90+3)
213	2022	11 Sep	Boca	**Boca**	1–0	Benedetto (65)	
214	2023	7 May	River	**River**	1–0	Borja (p. 90+3)	
215	2024	21 Sep	Boca	**River**	0–1		Lanzini (20)
216	2025	27 Apr	River	**River**	2–1	Mastantuono (26), Driussi (44)	Merentiel (38)
217	2025	9 Nov	Boca	**Boca**	2–0	Zeballos (45+1), Merentiel (47)	
218	2026	19 Apr	River	**Boca**	0–1		Paredes (p. 45+6)
219	2026	1 Nov	Boca	**Boca**	1–0	Di Lollo (27)	

Notes

Keys

- CH = Copa de Honor
- CC = Copa Campeonato
- Met = Metropolitano
- Nac = Nacional
- L = Liguilla Pre-Libertadores
- Ap = Apertura
- Cl = Clausura
- In = Inicial
- Fi = Final
- o.g. = Own goal

==== Head-to-head statistics in Primera División ====
**Boca Juniors wins**	**80**
**Draws**	**65**
**River Plate wins**	**73**
**Matches played**	**218**

=== National cups ===
The list below includes matches in national cup competitions. The club name in bold indicates a win. The score is given at full-time, in the goals columns the goal scorer and time when goal was scored is noted.

#	Cup	Year	Date	Venue	Winner	Score	Goals (H)	Goals (A)
1	Copa Jockey Club	1915	2 May	Boca	(Draw)	1–1 (aet)	Roldán (37)	C. García (40)
2	Copa Jockey Club	1915	9 May	GEBA	**River**	4–2	Chiappe (p. 15), Simmons (25), Penney (50), C. García (65)	E. Bertolini (5), Ochoa (30)
3	Copa Jockey Club	1918	30 Aug	Boca	**River**	1–0		Laiolo (17)
4	Copa A. Escobar	1942	1 Dec	River	(Draw)	0–0 (3–2, c.) (Note: River won 3–2 on most corner kicks awarded, qualifying to the next round.)		
5	Copa Británica	1946	15 Aug	San Lorenzo (Note: Boca as home team.)	**Boca**	2–0	Corcuera (20), G. Pin (57)	
6	Copa Centenario AFA	1993	3 Jul	Boca	(Draw)	0–0		
7	Copa Centenario AFA	1993	11 Jul	Vélez (Note: River as home team.)	**River**	1–0 (aet)	Silvani (116)	
8	Supercopa Argentina	2017	14 Mar	Malvinas Arg.	**River**	2–0	G.Martínez (p. 18), Scocco (70)	
9	Copa Liga Profesional	2020	2 Jan	Boca	(Draw)	2–2	Ábila, Villa	Girotti, Borré
10	Copa Liga Profesional	2021	14 Mar	Boca	(Draw)	1–1	Villa (p. 41)	Palavecino (67)
11	Copa Liga Profesional	2021	16 May	Boca	(Draw)	1–1 (4–2, p.) (Note: Boca Juniors advanced to the next stage after penalty shoot-out.)	Tevez (11)	Álvarez (68)
12	Copa Argentina	2019–20	4 Aug	Ciudad La Plata	(Draw)	0–0 (4–1, p.)		
13	Copa Liga Profesional	2022	20 Mar	River	**Boca**	1–0		Villa (53')
14	Copa Liga Profesional	2023	1 Oct	Boca	**River**	2–0		Rondón (40'), Enzo Díaz (92')
15	Copa Liga Profesional	2024	25 Feb	River	(Draw)	1–1	Solari (49')	Medina (70')
16	Copa Liga Profesional	2024	21 Apr	Mario Kempes	**Boca**	3–2	Merentiel (45+1', 67'), Cavani (62')	Borja (10'), P. Díaz (90+7')

Notes

Keys

- aet = after extra time
- QF = Quarter final
- SF = Semi-final
- C = Won by corner kick

==== Head-to-head statistics in national cups ====
**Boca Juniors wins**	**3**
**Draws**	**8**
**River Plate wins**	**5**
**Matches played**	**16**

=== Copa Libertadores ===
These are only matches in the Copa Libertadores, club name in bold indicate win. The score is given at full-time, in the goals columns the goal scorer and time when goal was scored is noted.

#	Year	Date	Round	Venue	Winner	Score	Goals (H)	Goals (A)
1	1966	10 Feb	1	River	**River**	2–1	Sarnari (33), Bayo (40)	A.H. Rojas (60)
2	1966	24 Mar	1	Boca	**Boca**	2–0	A.H. Rojas (46, 51)	
3	1966	14 Apr	SF	River	(Draw)	2–2	Sarnari (60), Silvero (o.g. 76)	Madurga (5), A.H. Rojas (8)
4	1966	4 May	SF	Boca	**Boca**	1–0	A.H. Rojas (72)	
5	1970	17 Feb	1	River	**Boca**	3–1	Gennoni (28)	Villagra (16), Coch (79, 90)
6	1970	19 Mar	1	Boca	**Boca**	2–1	Rojas (15), Savoy (40)	D. Onega (78)
7	1970	16 Apr	2	River	**River**	1–0	D. Onega (34)	
8	1970	30 Apr	2	Boca	(Draw)	1–1	A.C. Rojas (81)	D. Onega (65)
9	1977	9 Mar	1	Boca	**Boca**	1–0	Mouzo (87)	
10	1977	18 May	1	Huracán (Note: River Plate as home team.)	(Draw)	0–0		
11	1978	19 Sep	SF	Boca	(Draw)	0–0		
12	1978	17 Oct	SF	River	**Boca**	2–0	Mastrángelo (64), Salinas (77)	
13	1982	5 Aug	1	Boca	(Draw)	0–0		
14	1982	30 Sep	1	River	**River**	1–0	Bulleri (66)	
15	1986	9 Jul	1	Boca	(Draw)	1–1	Graciani (p. 34)	Alfaro (44)
16	1986	20 Aug	1	River	**River**	1–0	Alzamendi (62)	
17	1991	27 Feb	1	Boca	**Boca**	4–3	Latorre (28, 87), Giunta (56), Marchesini (71)	Borrelli (9, p. 31), Zapata (11)
18	1991	20 Mar	1	River	**Boca**	2–0	Batistuta (p. 24, 88)	
19	2000	17 May	QF	River	**River**	2–1	Ángel (15), Saviola (47)	Riquelme (29)
20	2000	24 May	QF	Boca	**Boca**	3–0	Delgado (59), Riquelme (p. 84), Palermo (90+4)	
21	2004	10 June	SF	Boca	**Boca**	1–0	Schiavi (28)	
22	2004	17 June	SF	Boca	**River**	2–1 (4–5 p) (Note: After the series ended 2–2 on aggregate, Boca won after a penalty shoot-out.)	L. González (50), Nasuti (90+4)	Tevez (88)
23	2015	7 May	1	River	**River**	1–0	C. Sánchez (p. 81)	
24	2015	14 May	1	Boca	(Draw)	0–0 Fft (Note: Game ruled forfeit by CONMEBOL Article 22 after it was suspended at 0–0 at half-time because of an attack on River Plate players in the tunnel with tear gas as they came out for the second half in Estadio Alberto J. Armando. CONMEBOL disqualified Boca Juniors from the tournament, with severe future CONMEBOL sanctions.)		
25	2018	11 Nov	Final	Boca	(Draw)	2–2	Ábila (34), Benedetto (45+1)	Pratto (35), Izquierdoz (o.g.) (61)
26	2018	9 Dec	Final	Real Madrid (Note: Because of an attack by River Plate fans towards the Boca Juniors bus at River Plate's home ground, injuring players on 24 November 2018, CONMEBOL moved the match to Madrid, Spain, at Estadio Santiago Bernabéu, home of Real Madrid C.F. The venue change was for both security and convenience for the winner)	**River**	3–1 (a.e.t.)	Pratto (68), Quintero (109), Martínez (120+2)	Benedetto (44)
27	2019	1 Oct	SF	River	**River**	2–0	Borré (p. 6), I. Fernández (69)	
28	2019	22 Oct	SF	Boca	**Boca**	1–0	Hurtado (79)	

Notes

Keys

- SF = Semi-final
- QF = Quarter final
- p = penalty shoot-out

==== Head-to-head statistics in the Copa Libertadores ====
**Boca Juniors wins**	**11**
**Draws**	**8**
**River Plate wins**	**9**
**Matches played**	**28**

=== Other international cups ===
These are only matches in other international cups. The club name in bold indicates a win. The score is given at full-time, in the goals columns the goal scorer and time when goal was scored is noted.

#	Cup	Year	Date	R	Venue	Winner	Score	Goals (H)	Goals (A)
1	Supercopa Libertadores	1994	6 Oct	QF	River	(Draw)	0–0		
2	Supercopa Libertadores	1994	13 Oct	QF	Boca	(Draw)	1–1 (5–4 p.) (Note: After the series ended 0–0 in goals, Boca qualified to the semifinals by penalty shoot-out.)	L. Carranza (6)	Francescoli (48)
3	Copa Sudamericana	2014	20 Nov	SF	Boca	(Draw)	0–0		
4	Copa Sudamericana	2014	27 Nov	SF	River	**River**	1–0	Pisculichi (16)	

Notes

Keys

- QF = Quarter final
- SF = Semi-final
- p = penalty shoot-out

==== Head-to-head statistics in other international cups ====
**Boca Juniors wins**	**0**
**Draws**	**3**
**River Plate wins**	**1**
**Matches played**	**4**

=== Friendly matches ===
List of all the non-official games played since their first match ever in 1908:

#	Year	Date	Type	Venue	Winner	Score	Boca goals	River goals
1	1908	2 Aug	Friendly	Boca	**Boca**	2–1	(unknown)	(unknown)
2	1912	15 Dec	Friendly	River	(Draw)	1–1	(unknown)	(unknown)
3	1936	11 Jan	Internacional Nocturno	San Lorenzo	(Draw)	3–3	Providente (5), Varallo (51), Garibaldi (77)	Castillo (12), Rongo (34, 51)
4	1937	12 Oct	Friendly	San Lorenzo	**Boca**	3–2	Gareri (10), González (35, 68)	Moreno (2), Pedernera (16)
5	1938	12 Feb	Internacional Nocturno	San Lorenzo	**Boca**	3–1	Mesa (57), González (60), Sabio (88)	Rongo (5)
6	1940	20 Jan	Triangular Verano	San Lorenzo	**Boca**	3–2	Mingo (1), Valsecchi (40, 70)	D'Alessandro (36), Labruna (84)
7	1940	24 Mar	Triangular Verano	San Lorenzo	**River**	1–2	Gandulla (8)	Labruna (19), Peucelle (57)
8	1941	6 Feb	Triangular Verano	San Lorenzo	**Boca**	3–2	Gandulla (9, 47), Sarlanga (73)	Deambrosi (11, 37)
9	1941	12 Feb	Triangular Verano	Chacarita	(Draw)	2–2	Gandulla (5, 49)	D'Alessandro (24), Deambrosi (43)
10	1942	17 Jan	Triangular Verano	San Lorenzo	**Boca**	3–2	Rosell (3), Alarcón (7, 36)	Rivero (78), Deambrosi (82)
11	1942	28 Jan	Triangular Verano	San Lorenzo	**River**	3–0		Sánchez (62), D'Alessandro (72), Deambrosini (82)
12	1942	7 Feb	Cuadrangular Rosario	Newell's	**Boca**	3–0	Corcuera (8), Rosell (20), Gelpi (60)	
13	1946	7 Apr	Friendly	San Lorenzo	**River**	1–0		Labruna (60)
14	1948	17 Aug	Friendly	San Lorenzo	**River**	5–1	Geronis (64)	Di Stéfano (27, 36), Moreno (42), de Rossi (70), Labruna (80)
15	1951	18 Mar	Friendly	Huracán	**River**	5–4	Martínez (22), Campana (28), Pentrelli (48), Borello (54)	W. Gómez (20), Muñoz (42), Ferrari (47), Labruna (p. 62, 65)
16	1955	29 Dec	Hexagonal Centenario	Centenario	**Boca**	5–2	Etcheverry (6), Boyé (33, p. 56, 63, 69)	W. Gómez (5), Menéndez (12)
17	1958	30 Dec	Torneo Cuadrangular	Belgrano (C)	**River**	2–1	Nardiello (37)	Menéndez (18), De Bourgoing (p. 20)
18	1961	10 Jan	Octogonal Verano	River	(Draw)	1–1	Grillo (52)	Sarnari (49)
19	1961	4 Jun	Friendly	River	(Draw)	2–2	Almir (32), Valentim (34)	Delém (28), Pepillo (51)
20	1964	19 Apr	Copa Jorge Newbery	River	**Boca**	4–0		Silveira (10), Valentim (26, p. 29), González (49)
21	1964	22 Apr	Friendly	Talleres (C)	(Draw)	0–0		
22	1964	16 Jul	Copa Iberoamericana	River	**River**	1–3	Artime (18, 81), Matosas (51)	Ferreyra (7)
23	1968	22 Aug	Copa Ciudad Bs. Aires	Boca	(Draw)	0–0		
24	1970	1 Aug	Copa Cdad. Rosario	Newell's	**River**	2–2 (2–1 p)	Laraignee (7), Morete (42)	Cabrera (62), Suñé (82)
25	1974	23 Jan	Copa de Oro	Gral. San Martín (Note: Located in Mar del Plata, was the main stadium of the city until the Estadio José María Minella was inaugurated in 1978.)	(Draw)	0–0		
26	1974	16 Apr	Jardín de la República	At. Tucumán	**River**	2–1	Morete (13, 26)	Letanú (90)
27	1974	4 Jun	Madre de las Ciudades	Central Córdoba (SdE)	**Boca**	2–0	Ferrero (63), Ponce (80)	
28	1974	15 Jun	Tacita de Plata	GyE (Juj)	**River**	2–0	Marchetti (56), Morete (70)	
29	1974	20 Jun	Cdad. Santa Fe	Colón	**River**	1–0	Mastrángelo (65)	
30	1974	23 Jun	Liga del Sur	Olimpo (BB)	(Draw)	0–0		
31	1974	30 Jun	Friendly	Cipolletti	**River**	1–0		J.J. López (65)
32	1975	10 Feb	Copa de Oro	Grl. S.Martín	(Draw)	2–2	Potente (14), Tarantini (60)	Alonso (20), Mas (36)
33	1977	12 Feb	Copa de Oro	Grl. S.Martín	(Draw)	0–0		
34	1978	25 Feb	Copa de Oro	Grl. S.Martín	(Draw)	1–1	Mouzo (p. 52)	Alonso (p. 66)
35	1978	27 Feb	Ciudad Montevideo	Centenario	**River**	2–0		Alonso (p. 8, 61)
36	1979	21 Feb	Copa Oro	J.M. Minella	**River**	1–0		Galletti (78)
37	1979	21 Mar	Copa de los Grandes	Mario Kempes	**Boca**	3–1	Salinas (18), Zanabria (55), Robles (57)	R. Díaz (83)
38	1979	3 Jun	Torneo de Campeones	River	**River**	1–0		Galletti (35)
39	1980	6 Feb	Copa Oro	J.M. Minella	(Draw)	1–1	Bordón (34)	Alonso (11)
40	1980	16 Jul	Friendly	Malvinas Argentinas	(Draw)	1–1	Ribolzi (p. 48)	R. Díaz (34)
41	1982	6 Feb	Copa Oro	J.M. Minella	(Draw)	1–0		R. Díaz (15)
42	1983	26 Feb	Copa Oro	J.M. Minella	**Boca**	2–1	Krasouski (1), Berta (59)	Nieto (33)
43	1984	1 Feb	Copa Montevideo	Centenario		2–0	Gareca (37), Porté (82)	
44	1984	16 Feb	Copa Oro	J.M. Minella	**Boca**	3–0	Gareca (p. 42, 46, 67)	
45	1985	26 Feb	Copa Oro	J.M. Minella	**River**	3–2	Giachello (11), Passucci (p. 56)	Gallego (13), H. Enrique (32) Amuchástegui (48)
46	1985	20 Dec	Copa La Capital	R. Central	**River**	1–1 (4–3)	Brown (p. 64)	Morresi (71)
47	1986	11 Jan	Copa Oro	J.M. Minella	(Draw)	1–1	Fornés (32)	Karabín (77)
48	1986	11 Feb	Copa Oro	J.M. Minella	**River**	1–0		Gorosito (83)
49	1986	27 Mar	Cuadrangular de Grandes	Mario Kempes	(Draw)	1–1 (5–4)	Graciani (41)	Francescoli (p. 51)
50	1987	28 Jan	Copa Oro	J.M. Minella	(Draw)	3–3	Rinaldi (23), Comas (67), Hrabina (90)	Hernández (p. 45), Funes, (62), Alzamendi (64)
51	1987	11 Feb	Mun. Gral. Pueyrredón	J.M. Minella	**River**	3–1	Graciani (87)	Abramovich (o.g. 24), Erbín (75), Caniggia (76)
52	1987	26 Feb	Cdad. Mar Plata	J.M. Minella	(Draw)	2–2	Comas (38, 62)	Gorosito (49), P. Hernández (81)
53	1988	27 Jan	Copa Oro	J.M. Minella	**Boca**	1–0	Graciani (48)	
54	1988	23 Feb	Cdad. Mar Plata	J.M. Minella	**Boca**	2–1	Comas (43), Melgar (51)	Alzamendi (p. 50)
55	1990	20 Jan	Copa Oro	J.M. Minella	(Draw)	0–0		
56	1990	19 Feb	Cdad. Mar Plata	J.M. Minella	**River**	1–0		Serrizuela (32)
57	1991	26 Jan	Copa Oro	J.M. Minella	**Boca**	2–1	Tapia (15, 85)	J. Higuaín (35)
58	1991	16 Feb	Cdad. Mar Plata	J.M. Minella	**Boca**	2–0	Batistuta (p. 6, 59)	
59	1992	22 Jan	Copa Oro	J.M. Minella	**Boca**	2–1	Cabañas (49), Apud (60)	Zapata (71)
60	1992	17 Feb	Revancha	J.M. Minella	**Boca**	1–0	Villarreal (44)	
61	1993	23 Jan	Copa Oro	J.M. Minella	(Draw)	2–2	Acosta (28, 61)	R. Díaz (47), Ortega (83)
62	1993	27 Jan	Copa Desafío	J.M. Minella	**Boca**	1–0	A. Acosta (64)	
63	1993	10 Feb	Cdad. Mar Plata	J.M. Minella	(Draw)	1–1	Cabañas (76)	Cácere (35)
64	1993	13 Feb	Copa Revancha	J.M. Minella	**River**	2–1	S. Martínez (22)	R. Díaz (14, 54)
65	1994	26 Jan	Copa Desafío	Malvinas Arg.	**Boca**	2–1	Mancuso (43), Márcico (53)	F. Villalba (76)
66	1994	19 Feb	Copa Oro	Malvinas Arg.	**Boca**	1–0	Márcico (72)	
67	1994	23 Feb	Copa Revancha	Malvinas Arg.	**Boca**	3–1	Mac Allister (13), Da Silva (54), A. Acosta (88)	Rivarola (84)
68	1995	28 Jan	Copa Desafío	Malvinas Arg.	**River**	2–0		Amato (13), Berti (85)
69	1995	15 Feb	Copa Revancha	J.M. Minella	**River**	0–0 (4–2, p.)		
70	1995	3 Jul	Copa Brahma	Malvinas Arg.	**Boca**	2–1	Saldaña (58), Márcico (p. 67)	Rivarola (p. 47)
71	1996	27 Jan	Copa Desafío	Malvinas Arg.	**River**	1–0		Rivarola (p. 62)
72	1996	15 Feb	Copa Revancha	J.M. Minella	**River**	1–0	Francescoli (14)	
73	1997	30 Jan	Copa Desafío	Malvinas Arg.	**Boca**	4–1	Rambert (p. 3, 39), Altamirano (o.g. 42), Cedrés (p. 88)	Escudero (56)
74	1997	16 Feb	Copa Revancha	J.M. Minella	**River**	1–1 (5–3 p.)	Cagna (64)	Astrada (53)
75	1998	24 Jan	Copa Desafío	J.M. Minella	**Boca**	0–0 (4–3 p.)		
76	1998	10 Feb	Copa Revancha	Malvinas Arg.	**Boca**	0–0 (4–2 p.)		
77	1999	27 Jan	Copa Desafío	J.M. Minella	**Boca**	2–1	Gvo. B. Schelotto (27), Basualdo (69)	Javier Saviola (38)
78	1999	10 Mar	Copa Revancha	Malvinas Arg.	**Boca**	3–0	Palermo (14, 52, 83)	
79	2000	14 Jan	Cdad. Córdoba	Mario Kempes	**River**	3–0		Cardetti (15), Ángel (50), C. Ledesma (85)
80	2000	29 Jan	Copa Oro	J.M. Minella	**Boca**	2–0	F. Navas (8), A. Moreno (90)	
81	2000	9 Feb	Cdad. Mar Plata	J.M. Minella	**Boca**	2–1	A. Moreno (p. 28), Battaglia (34)	Ángel (14)
82	2001	21 Jan	Pentagonal Verano	J.M. Minella	**Boca**	1–0	Barijho (64)	
83	2001	25 Jan	Cdad. Córdoba	Mario Kempes	**Boca**	2–1	Riquelme (27), C. Rodríguez (61)	Cardetti (73)
84	2001	6 Feb	Copa Revancha	Malvinas Arg.	**Boca**	1–0	E. Herrera (10)	
85	2002	23 Jan	Copa Desafío	Malvinas Arg.	**River**	1–1 (5–4 p.)	Riquelme (3)	Fonseca (90+1)
86	2002	26 Jan	Cdad. Mar Plata	J.M. Minella	**Boca**	4–0 (Note: suspended after the 4th goal for incidents by River supporters)	Carreño (4, 58), O. Pérez (13), Delgado (19)	
87	2002	30 Jan	Cdad. Córdoba	Mario Kempes	**River**	1–0		Cavenaghi (46)
88	2002	15 Jun	Friendly	Orange Bowl (Note: Played in Miami, USA.)	**River**	2–1	N. Burdisso (8)	Lequi (90), Raponi (90+2)
89	2003	19 Jan	Pentagonal Verano	Malvinas Arg.	**Boca**	1–0	E. González (37)	
90	2003	25 Jan	Copa Desafío	J.M. Minella	**Boca**	0–0 (5–4)		
91	2003	7 Feb	Copa Revancha	Malvinas Arg.	**Boca**	3–3 (5–3 p.)	Caneo (17), A. Moreno (19), César González (89)	Cuevas (6, 47), Coudet (28)
92	2004	24 Jan	Pentagonal Verano	J.M. Minella	**River**	1–0		Montengreo (44)
93	2004	4 Feb	Copa Revancha	Malvinas Arg	**River**	3–1	Caneo (40)	Ludueña (35), Sand (42), Montenegro (81)
94	2005	22 Jan	Pentagonal Verano	J.M. Minella	(Draw)	0–0		
95	2005	30 Jan	Copa Revancha	Malvinas Arg.	**Boca**	2–0	Palacio (7), Ledesma (75)	
96	2006	14 Jan	Pentagonal Verano	J.M. Minella	**Boca**	3–2	Palacio (42, 48), D. Díaz (73)	Montenegro (58), L. Fernández (90+2)
97	2006	17 Jan	Copa Desafío	Ernesto Martearena	**River**	3–0		Santana (10), Montenegro (70), Oberman (83)
98	2007	20 Jan	Pentagonal Verano	J.M. Minella	**River**	2–0		Falcao (49), D. Galván (65)
99	2007	1 Feb	Copa Revancha	Malvinas Arg.	**River**	1–1 (6–5)	Palermo (40)	Ferrari (59)
100	2008	26 Jan	Pentagonal Verano	J.M. Minella	**Boca**	2–0	Battaglia (19), Palermo (55)	
101	2008	2 Feb	Copa Revancha	Malvinas Arg.	**River**	3–2	Paletta (16), Palermo (p. 50)	Falcao (24), Abreu (32), Ortega (p. 41)
102	2009	24 Jan	Pentagonal Verano	J.M. Minella	**Boca**	2–1	Dátolo (44, p. 85)	Cabral (35)
103	2009	1 Feb	Copa Revancha	Malvinas Arg.	**Boca**	2–0	Mouche (45), Roncaglia (76)	
104	2010	20 Jan	Copa Desafío	J.M. Minella	**River**	3–1	Palermo (30)	R. Rojas (3), R. Funes Mori (55), D. Villalva (64)
105	2010	24 Jan	Copa Revancha	Malvinas Arg.	**Boca**	1–1 (3–1 p.)	Viatri (31)	G. Bou (52)
106	2011	22 Jan	Luis Nofal	J.M. Minella	**Boca**	2–0	Colazo (10), Palermo (32)	
107	2011	2 Feb	Luis Nofal	Malvinas Arg.	(Draw)	1–1	Palermo (25)	Pavone (7)
108	2012	25 Jan	Luis Nofal	Centenario (R)	**Boca**	2–0	Blandi (6, 78)	
109	2012	29 Jan	Luis Nofal	Malvinas Arg.	**Boca**	1–0	Mouche (29)	
110	2013	19 Jan	Centenario LMF	J.M. Minella	**River**	2–0		Mora (68, 73)
111	2013	29 Jan	Luis Nofal	Malvinas Arg.	**Boca**	0–0 (5-4 p.)		
112	2013	2 Feb	Copa BBVA	Mario Kempes	**River**	2-1	Erviti (5)	Mora (27), Trezeguet (78)
113	2014	18 Jan	Copa Oro	J.M. Minella	(Draw)	1–1	Sánchez Miño (19)	Maidana (41)
114	2014	25 Jan	Copa BBVA	Mario Kempes	**River**	2–0		Lanzini (6), Menseguéz (41)
115	2014	1 Feb	Luis Nofal	Malvinas Arg.	**River**	2–1	D. Díaz (26)	Mercado (9), T. Gutiérrez (61)
116	2014	31 May	Copa BBVA	Azteca (Note: Played in Mexico DF.)	**River**	1–1 (4–2 p.)	Riaño (70)	D. Villalva (36)
117	2015	24 Jan	Luis Nofal	J.M. Minella	**Boca**	1–0	F. Cristaldo (17)	
118	2015	30 Jan	Luis Nofal	Malvinas Arg.	**Boca**	5–0	F. Cristaldo (14), S. Palacios (21), A. Chávez (30), Calleri (81), Bentancur (84)	
119	2015	10 Oct	Copa BBVA	Mario Kempes	**River**	1–0		L. González (6)
120	2016	23 Jan	Luis Nofal	J.M. Minella	**River**	1–0		Pisculichi (p. 18)
121	2016	30 Jan	Luis Nofal	Malvinas Arg.	**River**	1–0		Mora (p. 80)
122	2017	29 Jan	Copa BBVA	J.M. Minella	**River**	2–0		Driussi (p. 63), Mina (69)
123	2017	2 Sep	Copa BBVA	Bicentenario (SJ)	**Boca**	1–0	O. Benítez (69)	
124	2018	21 Jan	Luis Nofal	J.M. Minella	**River**	1–0		Borré (40)

Notes

Keys

- p = penalty shoot-out

==== Head-to-head statistics in Friendlies matches ====
**Boca Juniors wins**	**46**
**Draws**	**37**
**River Plate wins**	**41**
**Matches played**	**124**

=== Single eliminations between the two rivals ===
As of 2021, 21 single eliminations between Boca Juniors and River Plate had been played, three of them tournament's finals. River holds the upper hand, with 13 wins over Boca.

1. 1915 Copa Competencia: Boca 1–1 River; River 4–2 Boca (River won) (Note: Second leg played at GEBA)
2. 1918 Copa Competencia: River 1–0 Boca (River won) (Note: Played at Racing)
3. 1937 Primera División: River 5–3 Boca (River won) (Note: Match to decide the middle-season's first place, played at Estadio Gasómetro)
4. 1942 Copa Adrián C. Escobar semifinal: River 0–0 Boca (River won 3–2 on corner kicks) (Note: Played at Estadio Antonio Vespucio Liberti)
5. 1946 Copa de Competencia Británica semi-final: Boca 2–0 River (Boca won)
6. 1969 Metropolitano semifinal: River 0–0 Boca (River won) (Note: River won by goal average. Played at Racing)
7. 1972 Nacional semifinal: River 3–2 Boca (River won) (Note: Played at Vélez, River knocked out Boca of the next edition of Copa Libertadores.)
8. 1976 Nacional final: Boca 1–0 River (Boca won)
9. 1989 Liguilla Pre-Libertadores requalifying final: River 0–0 Boca; Boca 0–0 River; Boca 1–2 River (River won)
10. 1993 Copa Centenario: Boca 0–0 River; River 1–0 Boca (River won) (Note: Second leg played at Vélez)
11. 1994 Supercopa Libertadores: River 0–0 Boca; Boca 1–1 River (Boca won 5–4 by penalty shoot-out)
12. 2000 Copa Libertadores quarterfinals: River 2–1 Boca; Boca 3–0 River (Boca won)
13. 2004 Copa Libertadores semifinals: Boca 1–0 River; River 2–1 Boca (Boca won 5–4 by penalty shoot-out)
14. 2014 Copa Sudamericana semifinals: Boca 0–0 River; River 1–0 Boca (River won)
15. 2015 Copa Libertadores round of 16: River 1–0 Boca; Boca 0–0 River (River won) (Note: Second leg discontinued at half-time because a pepper-spray attack on several River players by Boca fans. Boca were eventually disqualified by CONMEBOL.)
16. 2017 Supercopa Argentina final: Boca 0–2 River (River won) (Note: Played at Estadio Malvinas Argentinas)
17. 2018 Copa Libertadores Finals: Boca 2–2 River; River 3–1 Boca (River won) (Note: Second leg played at Santiago Bernabeu Stadium, Madrid)
18. 2019 Copa Libertadores semifinals: River 2–0 Boca; Boca 1–0 River (River won)
19. 2021 Copa de la Liga Profesional quarterfinals: Boca 1–1 River (Boca won 4–2 by penalty shoot-out) (Note: Played at Estadio Alberto J. Armando. River had to make seven starting-players substitutions just hours before the match, after a COVID-19 outbreak infected 15 squad members, among them all the professional goalkeepers.)
20. 2019–20 Copa Argentina round of 16: Boca 0–0 River (Boca won 4–1 by penalty shoot-out) (Note: Played at the Estadio Ciudad de La Plata)
21. 2024 Copa de la Liga Profesional quarterfinals: River 2–3 (Boca won)

=== Match records ===
Largest margin of victory (4+ goals)
Date	Home team	Score	Away team
December 23, 1928	Boca Juniors	6–0	River Plate
October 19, 1941	River Plate	5–1	Boca Juniors
July 19, 1942	River Plate	4–0	Boca Juniors
August 17, 1955	River Plate	0–4	Boca Juniors
May 19, 1959	Boca Juniors	5–1	River Plate
March 7, 1982	River Plate	1–5	Boca Juniors

Highest scoring matches (7+ goals)
Date	Home team	Score	Away team
October 15, 1972	River Plate	5–4	Boca Juniors
November 24, 1957	River Plate	5–3	Boca Juniors
June 27, 1973	Boca Juniors	5–2	River Plate
February 3, 1974	Boca Juniors	5–2	River Plate
March 2, 1980	Boca Juniors	2–5	River Plate
February 27, 1991	Boca Juniors	4–3	River Plate

=== Player records ===
Top five appearances
Player	Club	Games
Reinaldo Merlo	River Plate	42
Hugo Gatti	Boca/River	38
Silvio Marzolini	Boca Juniors	37
Ángel Labruna	River Plate	35
Roberto Mouzo	Boca Juniors	35

Top five goalscorers
Player	Club	Goals
Ángel Labruna	River Plate	16
Oscar Más	River Plate	12
Paulo Valentim	Boca Juniors	10
Carlos Manuel Morete	River Plate	9
Martín Palermo	Boca Juniors	9
Bernabé Ferreyra	River Plate	8

== Players who have played for both clubs ==
List of 102 players who have played for Boca Juniors and River Plate

- Donato Abbatángelo
- Antonio Ameal Pereyra
- Severiano Álvarez
- Gabriel Amato
- Agustín Angotti
- Abel Balbo
- Juan C. Barberis
- Eduardo Bargas
- Carlos Barisio
- Gabriel Batistuta
- Sergio Berti
- Nicolás Bertolo
- Camilo Bonelli
- Claudio Cabrera
- Julio César Cáceres
- Fernando Cáceres
- Eugenio Cacopardo
- Zoilo Canavery
- Claudio Caniggia
- Gabriel Cedrés
- Ramón Centurión
- Francisco Aníbal Cibeyra
- Victorio Cocco
- Pablo Agustín Comelles
- Hugo Coscia
- Rubén da Silva
- Alberto De Zorzi
- Roque Ditro
- Jorge Diz
- Alfredo Elli
- Pablo Erbín
- Jonathan Fabbro
- Casildo Fallatti
- Jorge Hugo Fernández
- Ramón Ferreiro
- Luciano Figueroa
- Anempodisto García
- Demóstenes Gaete
- Rubén Horacio Galletti
- Fernando Gamboa
- Antonio Ganduglia
- Alfredo Garasini
- Ricardo Gareca
- Hugo Gatti
- Rubén Darío Gómez
- Rafael Hernández
- Jorge Higuaín
- Néstor Isella
- Ramón Lamique
- Agustín Lanata
- Miguel Ángel Loayza
- Juan Francisco Lombardo
- Carlos López
- Juan José López
- José Luis Luna
- Jonathan Maidana
- Alfredo Martín
- Joaquín Martínez
- Jorge Daniel Martínez
- Ernesto Mastrángelo
- Milton Melgar
- Jesús Méndez
- Norberto Menéndez
- Pedro Moltedo
- José Manuel Moreno
- Carlos Manuel Morete
- Juan José Negri
- Julio Olarticoechea
- Vicente Oñate
- Alberto Juan Penney
- Osvaldo Pérez
- Dante Pertini
- Juan José Pizzuti
- Lucas Pratto
- Sebastián Rambert
- Carlos Randazzo
- Gerardo Reinoso
- Jorge Rinaldi
- Miguel Ángel Rodríguez
- Alfredo Rojas
- Iseo Fausto Rosello
- Oscar Ruggeri
- Francisco Sá
- Carlos Horacio Salinas
- Juan Amador Sánchez
- Marcelo Saracchi
- Daniel Silguero
- Luis Solans
- Cataldo Spitale
- Ricardo Stagi
- Francisco Taggino
- Fabio Talarico
- Carlos Daniel Tapia
- Alberto Tarantini
- Julio César Toresani
- Víctor Trossero
- Juan Vairo
- José Luis Villarreal
- Nelson Vivas
- Hugo Zarich
- Ricardo Zatelli
- Bruno Urribarri
- Adam Bareiro

== Players who played for one club in youth career and for rival club in senior career ==
- Carlos Peucelle (youth career Boca Juniors, senior career River Plate)
- Ernesto Grillo (youth career River Plate, senior career Boca Juniors)
- Mariano Pavone (youth career Boca Juniors, senior career River Plate)
- Milan Borjan (youth career Boca Juniors, senior career River Plate)
- Nicolás Sánchez (youth career Boca Juniors, senior career River Plate)
- Matías Marchesini (youth career River Plate and Boca Juniors, senior career Boca Juniors)
- Facundo Colidio (youth career Boca Juniors, senior career River Plate)

== Coaches who worked at both clubs ==
- Renato Cesarini (also was a player of River Plate)
- Ferenc Plattkó
- José D'Amico
- Vladislao Cap (also was a player of River Plate)
- Néstor Rossi (also was a player of River Plate)
- Alfredo Di Stéfano (also was a player of River Plate)
- Ángel Cappa (assistant coach at Boca Juniors, manager at River Plate)
- José Varacka (also was a player of River Plate)
- Juan Carlos Lorenzo (also was a player of Boca Juniors)
- Héctor Veira
- César Luis Menotti (also was a player of Boca Juniors)

== Played for one club and coached the rival club ==
- Rogelio Domínguez (River Plate as player, Boca Juniors as coach)
- Adolfo Pedernera (River Plate as player, Boca Juniors as coach)
- Miguel Ángel López (River Plate as player, Boca Juniors as coach)
- Claudio Borghi (River Plate as player, Boca Juniors as coach)
- José Manuel Moreno (River Plate and Boca Juniors as player, Boca Juniors as coach)
- Francisco Sá (River Plate and Boca Juniors as player, Boca Juniors as coach)
- J.J. López (River Plate and Boca Juniors as player, River Plate as coach)

== River's greatest moments ==
- August 24, 1913: River won the first official Superclásico 2–1.
- October 19, 1941: The River team of the 1940s known as "La Máquina" beat Boca 5–1, their biggest win over Boca, on their way to the Argentine championship.
- July 19, 1942: River won 4–0, equaling their biggest win over Boca.
- November 8, 1942: River came back from 2–0 down to a 2–2 draw, clinching the championship of that year in the home of their archrivals for first time in history.
- December 8, 1955: River won the second championship at La Bombonera after a 2–1 victory over Boca.
- February 10, 1966: River won 2–1 at El Monumental in a match for the 1966 Copa Libertadores, in the first ever meeting of the clubs in international competitions.
- October 15, 1972: River came back from 4–2 down to win 5–4 in the highest scoring Superclásico in history.
- November 9, 1977: River came back from 1–0 down in La Bombonera to win 2–1 with a last minute goal from a 40 meters dash of Pedro Alexis González, securing River's top position in the 1977 Metropolitano championship, which they won in the next round.
- April 6, 1986: In a game remembered for being played with an orange ball, River won 2–0 at La Bombonera right after winning the 1985–86 championship.
- July 27, 1989: River won 2–1 the re-qualifying final of the 1989 Liguilla pre-Libertadores preventing Boca's qualification for Copa Libertadores 1990.
- July 18, 1993: River won 1–0 in José Amalfitani Stadium, with a Walter Silvani's golden goal, to eliminate Boca from the Copa Centenario, a tournament that was to commemorate AFA's 100 years since its foundation. It was the first and only Superclásico decided with a golden goal.
- December 11, 1994: River won 3–0 at La Bombonera, securing the 1994 Apertura.
- March 23, 1997: River came back from 3–0 down to draw 3–3, costing Boca a famous win at El Monumental
- March 10, 2002: River won 3–0 at La Bombonera on their way to win the 2002 Clausura.
- May 16, 2004: River won a decisive match at La Bombonera 1–0 with a goal from Fernando Cavenaghi, paving the way to win the 2004 Clausura.
- October 8, 2006: River defeated Boca 3–1 at El Monumental, breaking Boca's 22 game undefeated streak
- October 7, 2007: River won 2–0 at home to prevent Boca from going top of the table and damaged their chances of winning the 2007 Apertura.
- March 31, 2014: River defeated Boca 2–1 at La Bombonera with a goal from defender Ramiro Funes Mori after 10 years without winning at Boca's stadium. Later they clinched the Final 2014 championship.
- November 27, 2014: River defeated Boca 1–0 at El Monumental in the second leg of the 2014 Copa Sudamericana semifinals with a goal from Leonardo Pisculichi. The game was also memorable for the fact that goalkeeper Marcelo Barovero saved a penalty in the opening minutes of the game. River won 1–0 on aggregate and advanced to the finals for the first time since 2003. Boca were knocked out from an international competition by River for the first time in 28 years.
- May 7, 2015: River defeated Boca 1–0 at El Monumental in the first leg of the 2015 Copa Libertadores round of 16 with a goal from Carlos Sánchez from the penalty spot. In the second leg, the game was abandoned at half-time after River players were attacked with pepper spray by Boca fans, with the score still 0–0. The match was terminated and Boca were disqualified from the tournament. River would go on to win the cup for the first time since 1996 and for the third time in club history.
- March 14, 2018: River took revenge of the 1976 defeat in the Nacional championship final by beating Boca 2–0 to win the 2017 Supercopa Argentina in the Estadio Malvinas Argentinas, Mendoza. The match was the second ever final between the two adversaries.
- December 9, 2018: After drawing 2–2 at La Bombonera in the first leg of 2018 Copa Libertadores Finals, the second leg was postponed due to River fans throwing objects at the Boca bus, injuring several players. CONMEBOL controversially decided to play the second leg at the Santiago Bernabéu Stadium in Madrid, Spain, as Boca refused to play the second leg and River defended their right to play it at home. In Madrid, River would come back to win 3–1 in extra time in the first ever meeting between the two in an international competition final and Copa Libertadores finals.
- October 22, 2019: After winning 2–1 at El Monumental in the first leg of the 2019 Copa Libertadores Semifinal, River was able to secure qualification to the finals with a 1–0 loss in La Bombonera, marking the fifth direct elimination of Boca by River in five years (2014 Copa Sudamericana Semifinal, 2015 Copa Libertadores Round of 16, 2017 Supercopa Argentina, 2018 Copa Libertadores Final, 2019 Copa Libertadores Semifinal).

== Boca's greatest moments ==
- August 2, 1908: Boca won the first Superclásico on record 2–1.
- December 23, 1928: Boca defeated River 6–0, the biggest win in Superclásico history, with two goals from Domingo Tarasconi, Roberto Cherro and Esteban Kuko.
- May 19, 1959: After 18 years Boca avenged their 5–1 defeat by River with a 5–1 win at La Bombonera with two goals from Jose Yudica.
- December 9, 1962: Boca defeated River 1–0 at La Bombonera to secure the top position of 1962 championship, which they won in the next round. This match is well remembered by Boca's fans, because Antonio Roma stopped a penalty kick by Delem in the final minutes of the match.
- December 14, 1969: Despite River's recovery from a 0–2 down, Boca won the national championship in the home of their arch-rivals after a 2–2 drawn.
- February 3, 1974: Carlos García Cambón scored four goals on his Boca debut in a 5–2 win, the most goals scored by a single player in the Superclásico. It was also Boca's second successive 5–2 win.
- December 22, 1976: Boca won the first ever final between the two clubs 1–0 to claim the 1976 Nacional championship.
- April 10, 1981: Boca won 3–0 on their way to winning the 1981 Metropolitano championship, with a famous goal scored by Maradona against Ubaldo Fillol.
- March 7, 1982: Boca won 5–1 at El Monumental, in the 1982 Nacional championship, the biggest away win in the history of the Superclásico. Due to a contractual conflict, River played the match with youth players.
- February 27, 1991: Boca came back from 3–1 down to win 4–3 in the highest scoring Superclásico in Copa Libertadores history.
- March 31, 1991: Boca won its fifth consecutive derby of the year 1–0 at La Bombonera.
- July 14, 1996: Claudio Caniggia scored a hat-trick to help Boca win 4–1 at La Bombonera, barely a month after River won the 1996 Copa Libertadores.
- September 29, 1996: Boca won 3–2 at La Bombonera, with a neck goal from Hugo Romeo Guerra in injury time.
- May 24, 2000: Having lost the first leg of the 2000 Copa Libertadores quarter-final 2–1 at El Monumental, Boca won 3–0 at home to progress to the semi-final and later go on to win the competition and the Intercontinental Cup. Boca's third goal was scored by substitute Martín Palermo after a six-month injury.
- November 9, 2003: Boca, then champions of the 2003 Copa Libertadores, won 2–0 at El Monumental with goals scored by Brazilian striker Iarley and Sebastián Battaglia on their way to lift the Apertura 2003 title.
- June 17, 2004: Having won the first leg of the 2004 Copa Libertadores semi-final 1–0 at La Bombonera, Boca went to El Monumental, where River scored first. With just five minutes left Carlos Tevez scored to level the score 1–1 and so give Boca a 2–1 aggregate lead. However, a last-minute goal by Cristián Nasuti for River took the match to penalties. Boca then won the penalty shootout 5–4.
- May 4, 2008: Boca won 1–0 at La Bombonera with a goal by Sebastián Battaglia.
- October 18, 2008: Ten-man Boca won 1–0 at El Monumental on their way to winning the 2008 Apertura.
- January 31, 2015: At a friendly match in Mendoza, Boca won 5–0 and three River Plate players were red carded, being it the biggest win in the professional football era of the Superclásico.
- December 11, 2016: Boca came back from 2–1 down in the half-time to win 4–2 at El Monumental with two goals scored by returning idol Carlos Tevez.

== Honours ==
=== Official titles ===
Boca Juniors	Competition	River Plate
Domestic
36	League titles	38
17	National cups	16
53	Total	54
International
—	FIFA	—
3	UEFA / CONMEBOL	1
16	CONMEBOL	11
4	AFA / AUF	6
23	Total	18
Overall
76	Total	72
