= 1997–98 Club Atlético Boca Juniors season =

Boca Juniors football season

Boca Juniors
1997–98 season
- President: Mauricio Macri
- Manager: Héctor Veira
- Stadium: La Bombonera
- Apertura Tournament: 2nd.
- Clausura Tournament: 6th.
- Top goalscorer: League: All: Martín Palermo (20)
Home colours	Away colours

The 1997–98 Club Atlético Boca Juniors season was the 68th consecutive Primera División season played by the senior squad.

== Summary ==
The club reinforced the squad with several players: Claudio Caniggia came back after a brief retirement, forward Martin Palermo from Estudiantes La Plata, twins Guillermo Barros Schelotto, Gustavo Barros Schelotto arrived from Gimnasia LP, Colombian centre back Jorge Bermúdez from Benfica, goalkeeper Oscar Cordoba from America de Cali, defender Walter Samuel from Newell's Old Boys, Mexican striker Luis Hernandez and Peruvian midfielder Nolberto Solano.

In Apertura Tournament the squad finished on 2nd spot just one single point below champions River Plate. On 25 October 1997 Diego Maradona announced his retirement being in fact, the last official match that he played.

For the Clausura Tournament, the club was reinforced with Rodolfo Cardoso, Sergio Castillo and Colombian midfielder Mauricio Serna. In spite of being heavily favourites the squad sank to the 6th spot prompting coach Veira to quit as head coach on 2 May 1998. Chairman Mauricio Macri wanted to appoint Daniel Passarella- then coach of Argentina National team- as new head manager, however, after a majority of Boca fans rejected him due to his past a River Plate idol, the club board did not sign a contract.

Meanwhile, former Velez Sarsfield head coach Carlos Bianchi rejected an offer from Julio Grondona Chairman of AFA to be the Argentina National team coach after the 1998 FIFA World Cup not accepting Jose Pekerman as manager and his high influence on Grondona. On 27 May 1998 Bianchi took the vacancy out at Boca appointed by Macri as new head coach of the club with a contract signed until December 1999.

== Special uniforms ==
Alternate kits worn only in 1997 Supercopa Libertadores

Home	Away

== Squad ==
Permanent squad numbers entered into force since 1997 Apertura:
Note: Flags indicate national team as defined under FIFA eligibility rules; some limited exceptions apply. Players may hold more than one non-FIFA nationality.

No.	Pos.	Nation	Player
1	GK	COL	Oscar Córdoba
2	DF	COL	Jorge Bermúdez
3	DF	ARG	Mauricio Pineda
4	MF	PER	Nolberto Solano
5	MF	ARG	Alfredo Berti
6	DF	ARG	Néstor Fabbri
7	FW	URU	Sergio Martínez
28	MF	ARG	Julio Cesar Toresani
8	FW	ARG	Claudio Caniggia
9	FW	ARG	Martín Palermo
10	FW	ARG	Diego Maradona
11	MF	ARG	Diego Latorre
12	GK	ARG	Roberto Abbondanzieri
13	GK	ARG	Emanuel Ruiz

No.	Pos.	Nation	Player
14	DF	ARG	Nelson Vivas
16	DF	ARG	Christian Traverso
17	DF	ARG	Walter Samuel
18	DF	ARG	Rodolfo Arruabarrena
19	MF	ARG	Diego Cagna
20	MF	ARG	Juan Román Riquelme
21	MF	ARG	Gustavo Barros Schelotto
22	MF	ARG	César La Paglia
23	FW	ARG	Guillermo Barros Schelotto
25	GK	ARG	Christian Muñoz
26	MF	ARG	Pablo Islas
15	DF	ARG	Aníbal Matellán
24	FW	ARG	Sebastián Rambert
27	FW	MEX	Luis Hernández

=== Transfers ===
In
Pos.	Name	From	Type
GK	Oscar Cordoba	America de Cali	
MF	Nolberto Solano	Sporting Cristal	
FW	Martin Palermo	Estudiantes La Plata	
DF	Jorge Bermudez	Benfica	
FW	Guillermo Barros Schelotto	Gimnasia y Esgrima (LP)	
MF	Gustavo Barros Schelotto	Gimnasia y Esgrima (LP)	
DF	Walter Samuel	Newell's Old Boys	
FW	Luis Hernandez	Necaxa	loan

Out
Pos.	Name	To	Type
FW	Sergio Daniel Martinez	Deportivo La Coruña	
FW	Sebastián Rambert	River Plate	
MF	Gabriel Cedrés	Club América	
DF	Héctor Pineda	Udinese Calcio	

==== January ====
In
Pos.	Name	From	Type
MF	Mauricio Serna	Atlético Nacional	
MF	Rodolfo Cardoso	Hamburg SV	
MF	Sergio Castillo	Deportivo Español	

Out
Pos.	Name	To	Type
MF	Diego Maradona		retired
FW	Luis Hernandez	Necaxa	loan ended
DF	Nelson Vivas	FC Lugano	loan
MF	Gustavo Barros Schelotto	Unión de Santa Fe	loan
MF	Julio Cesar Toresani	Independiente	

== Competitions ==
=== Torneo Apertura ===
==== League table ====
Pos	Team	Pld	W	D	L	GF	GA	GD	Pts
1	River Plate	19	14	3	2	43	17	+26	45
2	Boca Juniors	19	13	5	1	35	12	+23	44
3	Rosario Central	19	10	5	4	35	20	+15	35
4	Vélez Sársfield	19	8	8	3	42	23	+19	32
5	San Lorenzo	19	9	5	5	42	32	+10	32

==== Position by round ====
Round	1	2	3	4	5	6	7	8	9	10	11	12	13	14	15	16	17	18	19
Ground	H	A	H	A	H	A	H	A	H	A	H	A	H	A	H	A	H	A	H
Result	W	D	W	D	W	D	W	W	W	W	L	W	D	W	W	W	D	W	W
Position	3	4	2	6	4	7	4	2	2	1	3	2	2	2	2	2	2	2	2

Source: www.afa.com.ar
A = Away; H = Home; W = Win; D = Draw; L = Loss

==== Matches ====
24 August 1997 1	Boca Juniors	4–2	Argentinos Juniors	Buenos Aires
	Latorre 6', 71'; Arruabarrena 12'; Maradona 62' (pen.)	Report	Gómez 10'; Vespa 80' (pen.)	Stadium: La Bombonera; Referee: Daniel Giménez

30 August 1997 2	Platense	2–2	Boca Juniors	Buenos Aires
	Spontón 10', 54'	Report	S. Martinez 40'; Arruabarrena 72'	Stadium: Jose Amalfitani; Referee: Francisco Lamolina

14 September 1997 3	Boca Juniors	2–1	Newell's Old Boys	Buenos Aires
	Maradona 40' (pen.); Guillermo B.S. 79'	Report	Lujambio 67'	Stadium: La Bombonera; Referee: Rubén Pascualino

16 September 1997 4	Velez Sarsfield	0–0	Boca Juniors	Buenos Aires
		Report		Stadium: José Amalfitani Stadium; Referee: Angel Sánchez

21 September 1997 5	Boca Juniors	2–1	San Lorenzo	Buenos Aires
	Latorre 19', 25'	Report	Biaggio 37'	Stadium: La Bombonera; Referee: Horacio Elizondo

27 September 1997 6	Estudiantes (LP)	0–0	Boca Juniors	Avellaneda
		Report		Stadium: Independiente; Referee: Javier Castrilli

30 September 1997 7	Boca Juniors	2–1	Independiente	Buenos Aires
	Palermo 1'; Arruabarrena 13'	Report	Rojas 52'	Stadium: La Bombonera; Referee: Angel Sánchez

4 October 1997 8	Gimnasia y Esgrima (J)	0–3	Boca Juniors	Jujuy
		Report	Bermúdez 55'; Palermo 56'; Latorre 72'	Stadium: 23 de Agosto; Referee: Oscar Sequeira

19 October 1997 9	Boca Juniors	2–1	Colón	Buenos Aires
	Fuertes 6' (o.g.); Latorre 44'	Report	Ibarra 56'	Stadium: La Bombonera; Referee: Francisco Lamolina

25 October 1997 10	River Plate	1–2	Boca Juniors	Buenos Aires
	S. Berti 40'	Report	Toresani 47'; Palermo 67'	Stadium: Estadio Monumental; Referee: Horacio Elizondo

1 November 1997 11	Boca Juniors	0–1	Lanús	Buenos Aires
		Report	Clotet 60'	Stadium: La Bombonera; Referee: Aníbal Hay

8 November 1997 12	Rosario Central	0-3	Boca Juniors	Rosario
		Report	Solano 47'; Latorre 58'; Guillermo B.S. 61'	Stadium: Gigante de Arroyito; Referee: Javier Castrilli

20 November 1997 13	Boca Juniors	1–1	Ferro Carril Oeste	Buenos Aires
	Guillermo B.S. 36'	Report	Bustos 46'	Stadium: La Bombonera; Referee: Oscar Sequeira

23 November 1997 14	Deportivo Español	0–4	Boca Juniors	Buenos Aires
		Report	Palermo 7'; Palermo 8'; Palermo 47'; Cagna 71'; Riquelme (yellow card); Guillermo Barros Schelotto (yellow card)	Stadium: Nueva España; Referee: Angel Sánchez

30 November 1997 15	Boca Juniors	2–1	Huracán	Buenos Aires
	Latorre 15'; Solano 75'	Report	Biscay 90'	Stadium: La Bombonera; Referee: Daniel Giménez

7 December 1997 16	Gimnasia y Esgrima (LP)	0–1	Boca Juniors	La Plata
		Report	Palermo 89'	Referee: Horacio Elizondo

10 December 1997 17	Boca Juniors	0–0	Racing	Buenos Aires
		Report		Stadium: La Bombonera; Referee: Angel Sánchez

14 December 1997 18	Gimnasia y Tiro (S)	0–1	Boca Juniors	Salta
		Report	P. Islas 77'	Stadium: Gigante del Norte; Referee: Francisco Lamolina

21 December 1997 19	Boca Juniors	4–0	Unión (SF)	Buenos Aires
	Arruabarrena 5'; Palermo 22'; Solano 51' (pen.); Latorre 71'	Report		Stadium: La Bombonera; Referee: Daniel Giménez

=== Torneo Clausura ===
==== League table ====
Pos	Team	Pld	W	D	L	GF	GA	GD	Pts
4	Gimnasia y Esgrima (J)	19	9	5	5	23	20	+3	32
5	San Lorenzo	19	9	3	7	36	27	+9	30
6	Boca Juniors	19	8	5	6	38	30	+8	29
7	River Plate	19	7	8	4	32	24	+8	29
8	Argentinos Juniors	19	7	7	5	26	17	+9	28

==== Position by round ====
Round	1	2	3	4	5	6	7	8	9	10	11	12	13	14	15	16	17	18	19
Ground	A	H	A	H	A	H	A	H	A	H	A	H	A	H	A	H	A	H	A
Result	W	L	W	L	L	D	W	D	D	W	L	D	L	L	W	W	W	W	D
Position	4	11	5	9	12	14	11	8	9	7	10	11	13	14	12	10	7	6	6

Source: www.afa.com.ar
A = Away; H = Home; W = Win; D = Draw; L = Loss

==== Matches ====
19 February 1998 1	Argentinos Juniors	1-3	Boca Juniors	Caballito
	Brizuela 80'	Report	Latorre 6'; Fabbri (yellow card); Arruabarrena (yellow card); Solano (yellow card); Cardoso (red card) 31'; Palermo (yellow card); Palermo 50'; Latorre 67'	Stadium: Ricardo Etcheverri; Referee: Elizondo

22 February 1998 2	Boca Juniors	0-4	Platense	La Boca
	Bermudez (yellow card); Cagna (yellow card); Cardoso (yellow card); Caniggia (yellow card) 89' (yellow-red card)	Report	Hanuch 2'; Godoy 74'; Hanuch 81'; Sponton 89'	Stadium: Estadio Alberto Cichero (La Bombonera); Referee: Ruscio

25 February 1998 3	Newell's Old Boys	2-4	Boca Juniors	Rosario
	Franco 43'; Quiroga 55'	Report	Serna 14'; Solano 21' (pen.); Palermo 31'; Guillermo Barros Schelotto 38'; Solano (yellow card); Fabbri (yellow card); Arruabarrena (yellow card)	Stadium: El Coloso del Parque; Referee: Castrilli

28 February 1998 4	Boca Juniors	2-3	Velez Sarsfield	La Boca
	Palermo 39'; Latorre 61'; Fabbri (yellow card) 86' (yellow-red card)	Report	Castroman 27'; Arruabarrena 53' (own goal); Chilavert 87' (pen.)	Stadium: Estadio Alberto Cichero (La Bombonera); Referee: Sanchez

8 March 1998 5	San Lorenzo	2-1	Boca Juniors	Almagro
	Basavilvaso 14'; Biagio 34'	Report	Palermo 7'; Bermudez (yellow card) 86' (yellow-red card); Palermo (yellow card) 89' (yellow-red card); Samuel (yellow card)	Stadium: Nuevo Gasometro; Referee: Gimenez

15 March 1998 6	Boca Juniors	0-0	Estudiantes La Plata	La Boca
	Fabbri (yellow card); Serna (yellow card); Cagna (yellow card); Palermo (yellow card)	Report		Stadium: Estadio Alberto Cichero (La Bombonera); Referee: Lamolina

22 March 1998 7	Independiente	0-4	Boca Juniors	Avellaneda
		Report	Arruabarrena 19'; Caniggia 39'; Solano (red card) 44'; Guillermo Barros Schelotto 65'; Guillermo Barros Schelotto 70'	Stadium: La Doble Visera; Referee: Madorran

27 March 1998 8	Boca Juniors	0-0	Gimnasia y Esgrima (J)	La Boca
	Latorre (penalty missed) 20'; Matellan (penalty missed) 52'; Arruabarrena (yellow card)	Report		Stadium: Estadio Alberto Cichero (La Bombonera); Referee: Elizondo

5 April 1998 9	Colon	2-2	Boca Juniors	Santa Fe
	Sandoval 2'; Fuertes 25'; Ulambre (yellow card) 74' (yellow-red card)	Report	Palermo 55'; Bermudez (yellow card); Serna (yellow card); Caniggia (yellow card)	Stadium: Cementerio de los Elefantes; Referee: Scime

11 April 1998 10	Boca Juniors	3-2	River Plate	La Boca
	Fabbri (yellow card) 13'; Guillermo Barros Schelotto (yellow card) 16'; Caniggia 56'; Serna (yellow card) 64'; Palermo 69'; Arruabarrena 73'; Palermo (yellow card) 87'	Report	Solari 36'; Salas (penalty missed) 53'; Berizzo (yellow card) 80' (yellow-red card); Salas 89'	Stadium: Estadio Alberto Cichero (La Bombonera); Referee: Castrilli

14 April 1998 11	Lanús	2-1	Boca Juniors	Lanús
	Serrizuela 55'; Siviero 74'	Report	Latorre 37'	Stadium: Estadio Ciudad de Lanús-Néstor Díaz Pérez; Referee: Gimenez

17 April 1998 12	Boca Juniors	1-1	Rosario Central	La Boca
	Latorre 12'	Report	Bustos Montoya 58'; Gaitan (yellow card) 68' (yellow-red card)	Stadium: Estadio Alberto Cichero (La Bombonera); Referee: Mendez

26 April 1998 13	Ferro Carril Oeste	4-1	Boca Juniors	Caballito
	Bustos 35'; Bustos 50'; Yaque 54'; Bustos 85'	Report	Palermo 27'	Stadium: Estadio Ricardo Etcheverri; Referee: Scime

2 May 1998 14	Boca Juniors	2-3	Deportivo Español	La Boca
	Caniggia 68'; Solano 72' (pen.)	Report	Galvan 41'; Parodi 44'; Parodi 48'	Stadium: Estadio Alberto Cichero (La Bombonera); Referee: Bongianino

5 May 1998 15	Huracán	2-4	Boca Juniors	Parque Patricios
	Guerra 26'; Montenegro 42'	Report	Palermo 36'; Fabbri 39'; Fabbri 80'; La Paglia 81'	Stadium: El Palacio; Referee: Lamolina

10 May 1998 16	Boca Juniors	3-1	Gimnasia y Esgrima (LP)	La Boca
	Fabbri 7'; Palermo 50'; Palermo 64'	Report	Sosa 32'	Stadium: Estadio Alberto Cichero (La Bombonera); Referee: Sanchez

12 May 1998 17	Racing	0-2	Boca Juniors	Avellaneda
		Report	Fabbri 75'; Caniggia 90'	Stadium: Cilindro de Avellaneda; Referee: Elizondo

31 May 1998 18	Boca Juniors	4-0	Gimnasia y Tiro (S)	La Boca
	Palermo 3'; Caniggia 10'; Cardoso 25'; Navas 81'	Report		Stadium: Estadio Alberto Cichero (La Bombonera); Referee: Ruscio

6 June 1998 19	Unión de Santa Fe	1-1	Boca Juniors	Santa Fe
	Castillo 90'	Report	Ortiz 57'	Stadium: Estadio 15 de Abril; Referee: Guerra

== Statistics ==
=== Players statistics ===
No.	Pos	Nat	Player	Total		Apertura 97		Clausura 98	
No.	Pos	Nat	Player	Apps	Goals	Apps	Goals	Apps	Goals
	GK	(Colombia) COL	Oscar Cordoba	25	0	17	0	8	0
	DF	(Peru) PER	Nolberto Solano	32	5	18	3	14	2
	DF	(Colombia) COL	Jorge Bermudez	31	1	17	1	14	0
	DF	(Argentina) ARG	Nestor Fabbri	27	4	12	0	15	4
	DF	(Argentina) ARG	Rodolfo Arruabarrena	35	6	18	4	17	2
	MF	(Argentina) ARG	Diego Cagna	33	1	19	1	14	0
	MF	(Argentina) ARG	Diego Latorre	30	14	18	9	12	5
	MF	(Argentina) ARG	Rodolfo Cardoso	11	1	0	0	11	1
	FW	(Argentina) ARG	Claudio Paul Caniggia	22	5	5	0	17	5
	FW	(Argentina) ARG	Martin Palermo	32	20	17	8	15	12
	FW	(Argentina) ARG	Guillermo Barros Schelotto	33	6	16	3	17	3
	GK	(Argentina) ARG	Roberto Abbondanzieri	13	0	2	0	11	0
	MF	(Argentina) ARG	Christian Traverso	13	0	12	0	1	0
	MF	(Argentina) ARG	Juan Roman Riquelme	19	0	13	0	6	0
	DF	(Argentina) ARG	Nelson Vivas	8	0	8	0		
	MF	(Argentina) ARG	Pablo Eduardo Islas	9	1	6	1	3	0
	DF	(Argentina) ARG	Hector Pineda	6	0	6	0		
10	FW	(Argentina) ARG	Diego Maradona	5	2	5	2	-	-
	MF	(Argentina) ARG	Gustavo Barros Schelotto	5	0	5	0	0	0
	MF	(Argentina) ARG	Alfredo Berti	13	0	13	0		
	DF	(Argentina) ARG	Emanuel Ruiz	9	0	5	0	4	0
	DF	(Argentina) ARG	Walter Samuel	12	0	4	0	8	0
	DF	(Argentina) ARG	Cesar Osvaldo La Paglia	9	1	3	0	6	1
	DF	(Argentina) ARG	Julio Cesar Toresani	16	1	16	1		
	FW	(Uruguay) URU	Sergio Daniel Martinez	1	1	1	1		
	DF	(Argentina) ARG	Anibal Matellan	6	0	1	0	5	0
	GK	(Argentina) ARG	Christan Fernando Muñoz	1	0	1	0	0	0
	FW	(Argentina) ARG	Sebastián Rambert	1	0	1	0		
	FW	(Mexico) MEX	Luis Hernandez	0	0	0	0	-	-
	MF	(Colombia) COL	Mauricio Serna	9	1	0	0	9	1
	DF	(Argentina) ARG	Sergio Castillo	13	0	0	0	13	0
	DF	(Argentina) ARG	Luis Darío Calvo	12	0	0	0	12	0
	DF	(Argentina) ARG	Ariel Rosada	8	0	0	0	8	0
	DF	(Argentina) ARG	Fernando Rodolfo Navas	6	1	0	0	6	1
	MF	(Argentina) ARG	Hernan Vigna	3	0	0	0	3	0
	FW	(Argentina) ARG	Fernando Ortiz	2	1	0	0	2	1
	DF	(Argentina) ARG	Hernan Florentin	2	0	0	0	2	0
	MF	(Argentina) ARG	Sebastián Battaglia	1	0	0	0	1	0
	DF	(Argentina) ARG	Héctor Andrés Bracamonte	1	0	0	0	1	0
	DF	(Argentina) ARG	Hugo Darío Dominguez	1	0	0	0	1	0
