= 1996–97 Club Atlético Boca Juniors season =

Boca Juniors football season

Boca Juniors
1996–97 season
- President: Mauricio Macri
- Manager: Carlos Bilardo (until 16 December 1995); Héctor Veira (Jan. 1997–)
- Stadium: La Bombonera
- Apertura Tournament: 10th.
- Clausura Tournament: 9th.
- Top goalscorer: League: All: Sergio Martinez (17)
Home colours	Away colours

The 1996–97 Club Atlético Boca Juniors season was the 67th consecutive Primera División season played by the senior squad.

== Summary ==
Macri reinforced the club with several players: Diego Latorre, Julio César Toresani, Néstor Lorenzo, Sandro Guzmán, Facundo Sava, Sebastián Rambert, Gabriel Cedrés, Diego Cagna, Mauricio Pineda, Hugo Guerra, Silvio Carrario, Fernando Cáceres and Christian Dollberg. Owing to health issues club star Diego Maradona took another retirement. Meanwhile, forward Claudio Paul Caniggia suffered his mother' suicide in Henderson and announced his own retirement for the next Apertura Tournament. Also, left winger Kily González, Juan Sebastián Verón were transferred out to Europe. 17-yr-old playmaker and future club legend Juan Román Riquelme made his debut in this Apertura tournament.

In Apertura Tournament, the squad was a total failure sinking down to the middle of the table far below of champions River Plate prompting Bilardo to be sacked during December.

In spite of rumors about Miguel Ángel Brindisi as new trainer, the club appointed Héctor Veira as new head coach and reinforced the squad with goalkeeper Roberto Abbondanzieri (returned from a loan Rosario Central), midfielder Christian Traverso, Alfredo Berti and Pedro González. However, in Clausura the team just reached a miserable ninth spot despite Sergio "Manteca" Martinez scored 15 goals being the Clausura top striker. Finally, by July 13 Diego Maradona came back from his brief retirement and played against Racing for the joy of Boca fans.

== Special uniforms ==
Alternate kits worn only in 1997 Supercopa Libertadores

Home	Away

== Squad ==
Note: Flags indicate national team as defined under FIFA eligibility rules; some limited exceptions apply. Players may hold more than one non-FIFA nationality.

No.	Pos.	Nation	Player
—	GK	COL	Carlos Navarro Montoya
—	GK	ARG	Sandro Guzmán
—	DF	ARG	Nelson Vivas
—	DF	ARG	Julio César Toresani
—	DF	ARG	Fernando Cáceres
—	DF	ARG	Néstor Fabbri
—	DF	ARG	Mauricio Pineda
—	DF	ARG	Néstor Lorenzo
—	DF	ARG	Aníbal Matellán
—	DF	ARG	Christian Dollberg
—	DF	ARG	Walter Del Río
—	MF	ARG	Kily González
—	MF	ARG	Diego Maradona
—	MF	ARG	Diego Latorre
—	MF	ARG	Juan Román Riquelme

No.	Pos.	Nation	Player
—	MF	ARG	José Basualdo
—	MF	ARG	Diego Cagna
—	MF	ARG	Roberto Pompei
—	MF	ARG	Ariel Rosada
—	MF	ARG	Raúl Peralta
—	MF	ARG	Pablo Trobbiani
—	FW	URU	Sergio Martínez
—	FW	ARG	Claudio Caniggia
—	FW	CMR	Alphonse Tchami
—	FW	URU	Gabriel Cedrés
—	FW	URU	Hugo Guerra
—	FW	ARG	Sebastián Rambert
—	FW	ARG	Facundo Sava
—	DF	ARG	Silvio Carrario
—	FW	ARG	Luis Darío Calvo

=== Transfers ===
Players in
Pos.	Name	From
MF	Diego Latorre	Racing Club
MF	Julio César Toresani	
DF	Néstor Lorenzo	
GK	Sandro Guzmán	
DF	Facundo Sava	
FW	Sebastián Rambert	Real Zaragoza
MF	Gabriel Cedrés	
MF	Diego Cagna	
DF	Hector Pineda	
MF	Hugo Guerra	
MF	Silvio Carrario	
DF	Fernando Cáceres	
MF	Christian Dollberg	

Players out
Pos.	Name	To
DF	Carlos Mac Allister	
DF	Fabián Carrizo	
FW	Darío Scotto	Rosario Central
MF	Juan Sebastián Verón	Sampdoria
MF	Kily González	Real Zaragoza

==== January ====
Players in
Pos.	Name	From
GK	Roberto Abbondanzieri	Rosario Central
MF	Christian Traverso	

Players out
Pos.	Name	To
GK	Carlos Navarro Montoya	Extremadura UD
MF	José Basualdo	Extremadura UD

== Competitions ==
=== Torneo Apertura ===
==== League table ====
Pos	Team	Pld	W	D	L	GF	GA	GD	Pts
8	Colón	19	6	8	5	26	24	+2	26
9	Newell's Old Boys	19	7	5	7	24	26	−2	26
10	Boca Juniors	19	7	4	8	36	33	+3	25
11	Estudiantes (LP)	19	7	4	8	27	28	−1	25
12	Gimnasia y Esgrima (J)	19	6	7	6	18	19	−1	25

Pos	Team	Pld	W	D	L	GF	GA	GD	Pts
1	River Plate	19	12	5	2	37	20	+17	41
2	Colón	19	9	8	2	36	28	+8	35
3	Newell's Old Boys	19	10	5	4	23	20	+3	35
4	Independiente	19	9	5	5	38	21	+17	32
5	Vélez Sársfield	19	9	3	7	25	18	+7	30
6	San Lorenzo	19	9	3	7	32	22	+10	30
7	Racing	19	7	6	6	24	22	+2	27
8	Platense	19	6	8	5	21	22	−1	26
9	Boca Juniors	19	6	7	6	34	32	+2	25
10	Ferro Carril Oeste	19	5	9	5	24	22	+2	24
11	Lanús	19	6	6	7	22	21	+1	24
12	Unión	19	6	6	7	31	36	−5	24
13	Gimnasia y Esgrima (LP)	19	6	5	8	19	25	−6	23
14	Huracán	19	5	7	7	22	33	−11	22
15	Huracán (C)	19	4	9	6	21	28	−7	21
16	Estudiantes (LP)	19	5	4	10	22	26	−4	19
17	Deportivo Español	19	4	7	8	19	25	−6	19
18	Rosario Central	19	4	6	9	24	27	−3	18
19	Banfield	19	4	4	11	20	32	−12	16
20	Gimnasia y Esgrima (J)	19	2	8	9	21	35	−14	14

==== Position by round ====
Round	1	2	3	4	5	6	7	8	9	10	11	12	13	14	15	16	17	18	19
Ground	A	H	A	H	A	H	A	H	A	H	A	H	A	H	A	A	H	A	H
Result	W	L	L	D	L	W	L	W	D	L	D	W	L	W	D	L	W	L	L

Source: www.afa.com.ar
A = Away; H = Home; W = Win; D = Draw; L = Loss

==== Matches ====
25 August 1996 1	Estudiantes (LP)	2–3	Boca Juniors	Buenos Aires
	Fúriga; F. Verón	Report	Basualdo 24'; Latorre 34'; Pompei 51'	Stadium: José Amalfitani; Referee: Aníbal Hay

3 September 1996 2	Boca Juniors	2–3	Colón	Buenos Aires
	Fabbri 44'; Martínez 83'	Report	Muller 45'; Cuberas 49'; Aquino 53'	Stadium: La Bombonera; Referee: Horacio Elizondo

7 September 1996 3	Lanús	3–1	Boca Juniors	Lanús
	Serrizuela 59'; Enría 79'; Belloso 90'		Cedrés 42'	Stadium: Lanús Stadium; Referee: Daniel Giménez

15 September 1996 4	Boca Juniors	1–1	San Lorenzo	Buenos Aires
	Rambert 49'		Abreu 61'	Stadium: La Bombonera; Referee: Ángel Sánchez

21 September 1996 5	Huracán (C)	1–3	Boca Juniors	Corrientes
	Amato 83'		Guerra 9'; Pompei 57'; Vivas 80'	Stadium: Huracán (C); Referee: Luis Oliveto

29 September 1996 6	Boca Juniors	3–2	River Plate	Buenos Aires
	Pompei 5'; Cedrés 61'; Guerra 90'	Report	Salas 21'; Sorín 72'	Stadium: La Bombonera; Referee: Daniel Giménez

13 October 1996 7	Ferro Carril Oeste	3–1	Boca Juniors	Buenos Aires
	Piaggio 56', 86', 88'	Report	Rambert 87'	Stadium: Ferro C. Oeste; Referee: Aníbal Hay

20 October 1996 8	Boca Juniors	2–1	Newell's Old Boys	Buenos Aires
	Guerra 25', 81'	Report	Giménez 12'	Stadium: La Bombonera; Referee: Francisco Lamolina

27 October 1996 9	Vélez Sarsfield	1–1	Boca Juniors	Buenos Aires
	Camps 5'	Report	Toresani 78'	Stadium: José Amalfitani; Referee: Ángel Sánchez

3 November 1996 10	Boca Juniors	0–1	Independiente	Buenos Aires
		Report	Guerrero 66'	Stadium: La Bombonera; Referee: Roberto Ruscio

7 November 1996 11	Gimnasia y Esgrima (LP)	1–1	Boca Juniors	La Plata
	Guillermo B. Schelotto	Report	Rambert	Stadium: Juan C. Zerillo; Referee: Francisco Lamolina

10 November 1996 12	Boca Juniors	2–0	Unión (SF)	Buenos Aires
	Guerra 39'; Cáceres 64'	Report		Stadium: La Bombonera; Referee: Luis Oliveto

17 November 1996 13	Banfield	3–1	Boca Juniors	Banfield
	Lemma 7'; Alvarenga 34'; Arce 75'	Report	Rambert 78'	Stadium: Florencio Sola; Referee: Javier Castrilli

24 November 1996 14	Boca Juniors	6–0	Huracán	Buenos Aires
	Toresani 16'; Rambert 40'; Fabbri 44'; Cedrés 68'; Latorre 71'; Riquelme 82'	Report		Stadium: Estadio Alberto Cichero (La Bombonera); Referee: A. Sánchez

26 November 1996 15	Deportivo Español	1–1	Boca Juniors
	Guede 77'	Report	Cedrés 35'	Referee: Humberto Dellacasa

1 December 1996 16	Racing	4–2	Boca Juniors	Avellaneda
	Brusco 34'; Delgado 48'; I. González 77'; Marini 80'	Report	Toresani 15', 67'	Stadium: Racing Club; Referee: Aníbal Hay

6 December 1996 17	Boca Juniors	4–1	Platense	Buenos Aires
	Toresani 5'; Cedrés 30', 82'; Latorre 57'		Coria 54'	Stadium: La Bombonera; Referee: Hugo Cordero

18 December 1996 18	Rosario Central	4–2	Boca Juniors	Rosario
	Cardetti 1', 26'; Carbonari 43'; Da Silva 53'	Report	Riquelme 17'; Latorre 67'	Stadium: Gigante de Arroyito; Referee: Javier Castrilli

22 December 1996 19	Boca Juniors	0–1	Gimnasia y Esgrima (J)	Buenos Aires
			Trimarchi 40'	Stadium: La Bombonera; Referee: Méndez

=== Torneo Clausura ===
==== League table ====
Pos	Team	Pld	W	D	L	GF	GA	GD	Pts
7	Racing	19	7	6	6	24	22	+2	27
8	Platense	19	6	8	5	21	22	−1	26
9	Boca Juniors	19	6	7	6	34	32	+2	25
10	Ferro Carril Oeste	19	5	9	5	24	22	+2	24
11	Lanús	19	6	6	7	22	21	+1	24

==== Position by round ====
Round	1	2	3	4	5	6	7	8	9	10	11	12	13	14	15	16	17	18	19
Ground	H	A	H	A	H	A	H	A	H	A	H	A	H	A	H	H	A	H	A
Result	W	L	D	D	W	D	D	D	L	L	W	D	W	D	L	W	L	W	D
Position	3	8	9	15	9	11	12	12	14	15	11	11	10	11	11	9	10	8	9

Source: www.afa.com.ar
A = Away; H = Home; W = Win; D = Draw; L = Loss

==== Matches ====
23 February 1997 1	Boca Juniors	2–1	Estudiantes (LP)	Buenos Aires
	Fabbri 44'; Latorre 57'	Report	Arruabarrena 55' (o.g.)	Stadium: La Bombonera; Referee: Francisco Lamolina

1 March 1997 2	Colón	1–0	Boca Juniors	Santa Fe
	Castillo 61'	Report		Stadium: Colón; Referee: Ángel Sánchez

4 March 1997 5	Boca Juniors	1–1	Lanús	Buenos Aires
	Latorre 80'		A. López 5'	Stadium: La Bombonera; Referee: Horacio Elizondo

9 March 1997 4	San Lorenzo	4–0	Boca Juniors	Buenos Aires
	Gorosito 22', 29'; Silas 41', 79'	Report		Stadium: San Lorenzo; Referee: Aníbal Hay

14 March 1997 5	Boca Juniors	4–1	Huracán (C)	Buenos Aires
	S. Martínez 23', 55', 63', 83'	Report	Lujambio 71'	Stadium: La Bombonera; Referee: Hugo Cordero

23 March 1997 6	River Plate	3–3	Boca Juniors	Buenos Aires
	Cedrés 5'; S. Martínez 17', 29'	Report	S. Berti 42'; Villalba 76'; C. Ayala 87'	Stadium: Monumental; Referee: Javier Castrilli

6 April 1997 7	Boca Juniors	1–1	Ferro Carril Oeste	Buenos Aires
	S. Martínez 47'	Report	Flores 82'	Stadium: La Bombonera; Referee: Rubén Pascualino

12 April 1997 8	Newell's Old Boys	1–1	Boca Juniors	Rosario
	Dalla Líbera 30'	Report	Latorre 41'	Stadium: Newell's O.B. Referee: Francisco Lamolina

20 April 1997 9	Boca Juniors	1–2	Vélez Sarsfield	Buenos Aires
	Riquelme 3'	Report	Chilavert 45' (pen.); Moriggi 80'	Stadium: La Bombonera; Referee: Daniel Giménez

4 Mat 1997 10	Independiente	2–0	Boca Juniors	Avellaneda
	Burruchaga 31', 83'	Report		Stadium: Independiente; Referee: Javier Castrilli

7 November 1996 11	Boca Juniors	6–1	Gimnasia y Esgrima (LP)	Buenos Aires
	Sava 23'; Latorre 26', 35'; S. Martínez 60', 62', 73', 88'	Report		Stadium: La Bombonera; Referee: Rubén Pascualino

14 May 1997 12	Unión (SF)	3–3	Boca Juniors	Santa Fe
	Garate 28'; Perezlindo 43'; Magnin 54'	Report	S. Martínez 30', 48'; Toresani 84'	Stadium: 15 de Abril; Referee: Daniel Giménez

16 May 1997 13	Boca Juniors	3–1	Banfield	Buenos Aires
	S. Martínez 69'; Toresani 77'; Tchami 90'	Report	Campodónico 12'	Stadium: La Bombonera; Referee: Alejandro Sliwa

26 May 1997 14	Huracán	1–1	Boca Juniors	Buenos Aires
	C. García 77'	Report	S. Martínez 35'	Stadium: Tomás Ducó; Referee: Luis Pasturenzi

1 June 1997 15	Boca Juniors	1–3	Deportivo Español	Buenos Aires
	Cedrés 22'	Report	Almirón 4'; Galván 51'; Parodi 90'	Stadium: La Bombonera; Referee: Roberto Ruscio

13 July 1997 16	Boca Juniors	3–2	Racing	Buenos Aires
	Rambert 15', 21'; Fabbri 34'	Report	I. González 23' (pen.); Delgado 80'	Stadium: La Bombonera; Referee: Aníbal Hay

7 August 1997 17	Platense	1–0	Boca Juniors	Florida
	Loyola 88'	Report		Stadium: Vicente López; Referee: Guerra

10 August 1997 18	Boca Juniors	4–3	Rosario Central	Buenos Aires
	Rambert 13', 69', 86'; Riquelme 90'	Report	Da Silva 39'; Cardetti 50', 61'	Stadium: La Bombonera; Referee: Oscar Sequeira

12 August 1997 19	Gimnasia y Esgrima (J)	0–0	Boca Juniors	Jujuy
		Report		Stadium: Gimnasia y Esgrima; Referee: Carlos Salado

== Statistics ==
=== Players statistics ===
No.	Pos	Nat	Player	Total		Apertura 96		Clausura 97	
No.	Pos	Nat	Player	Apps	Goals	Apps	Goals	Apps	Goals
	GK	(Colombia) COL	Carlos Fernando Navarro Montoya	13	0	13	0	-	-
		(Argentina) ARG	Nelson Vivas	27	1	16	1	11	0
	DF	(Argentina) ARG	Néstor Fabbri	29	4	16	2	13	2
	MF	(Argentina) ARG	Kily González	1	0	1	0	-	-
	FW	(Uruguay) URU	Sergio Daniel Martinez	17	16	2	1	15	15
	FW	(Argentina) ARG	Claudio Paul Caniggia	0	0	0	0	0	0
10	FW	(Argentina) ARG	Diego Maradona	1	0	0	0	1	0
		(Argentina) ARG	Raul Alejandro Peralta	8	0	2	0	6	0
	MF	(Cameroon) CMR	Alphonse Marie Tchami	12	1	7	0	5	1
		(Argentina) ARG	Luis Darío Calvo	6	0	2	0	4	0
	MF	(Argentina) ARG	José Horacio Basualdo	9	1	9	1	-	-
	MF	(Argentina) ARG	Walter José Del Río	2	0	1	0	1	0
	FW	(Argentina) ARG	Sebastián Rambert	27	10	18	5	9	5
	MF	(Argentina) ARG	Diego Latorre	35	9	19	4	16	5
	DF	(Argentina) ARG	Roberto Pompei	30	3	18	3	12	0
	DF	(Argentina) ARG	Julio César Toresani	31	7	16	5	15	2
	DF	(Argentina) ARG	Fernando Cáceres	15	1	15	1	-	-
	MF	(Argentina) ARG	Diego Cagna	29	1	15	1	14	0
	MF	(Uruguay) URU	Gabriel Cedrés	28	8	13	6	15	2
	MF	(Uruguay) URU	Hugo Romeo Guerra	12	5	12	5		
	DF	(Argentina) ARG	Cristian Dollberg	12	0	12	0		
	DF	(Argentina) ARG	Héctor Pineda	17	0	9	0	8	0
	MF	(Argentina) ARG	Juan Román Riquelme	22	4	8	2	14	2
	FW	(Argentina) ARG	Facundo Sava	7	0	7	0	-	-
	DF	(Argentina) ARG	Silvio Carrario	6	0	6	0	-	-
	GK	(Argentina) ARG	Sandro Daniel Guzman	18	0	6	0	12	0
	DF	(Argentina) ARG	Néstor Gabriel Lorenzo	13	0	6	0	7	0
	MF	(Argentina) ARG	Pablo Marcelo Trobbiani	4	0	4	0		
	DF	(Argentina) ARG	Aníbal Matellán	12	0	2	0	10	0
	DF	(Argentina) ARG	Ariel Rosada	3	0	1	0	2	0
	MF	(Argentina) ARG	Christian Traverso	14	0	0	0	14	0
	DF	(Argentina) ARG	Rodolfo Arruabarrena	12	0	0	0	12	0
	MF	(Argentina) ARG	Pedro Enrique González	12	0	0	0	12	0
	GK	(Argentina) ARG	Roberto Abbondanzieri	8	0	0	0	8	0
	MF	(Argentina) ARG	Blas Giunta	8	0	0	0	8	0
	DF	(Argentina) ARG	Alfredo Jesus Berti	7	0	0	0	7	0
	DF	(Argentina) ARG	Ruben Darío Cantero	2	0	0	0	2	0
	DF	(Argentina) ARG	Emanuel Ruiz	2	0	0	0	2	0
	DF	(Argentina) ARG	German Gallo	1	0	0	0	1	0
	DF	(Argentina) ARG	Diego Gastón Herrera	1	0	0	0	1	0
	DF	(Argentina) ARG	Gustavo Hernan Scolari	1	0	0	0	1	0
	DF	(Argentina) ARG	Carlos Alcides Zapella	1	0	0	0	1	0
