= 1962 Argentine Primera División =

71st season of top-tier football league in Argentina

Primera División
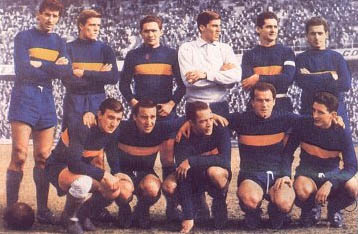
- Boca Juniors, champion
- Season: 1962
- Champions: Boca Juniors (14th title)
- Promoted: Quilmes
- Relegated: Ferro C. Oeste; Quilmes
- 1963 Copa Libertadores: Boca Juniors
- Top goalscorer: (Argentina) Luis Artime (25 goals)

The 1962 Argentine Primera División was the 71st season of top-flight football in Argentina. The season began on March 25 and ended on December 12.

Boca Juniors won its 14th championship, with Ferro C. Oeste and Quilmes being relegated to Primera B by the average system.

== League standings ==
Pos	Team	Pld	W	D	L	GF	GA	GD	Pts
1	Boca Juniors	28	18	7	3	45	18	+27	43
2	River Plate	28	18	5	5	61	28	+33	41
3	Gimnasia y Esgrima (LP)	28	16	6	6	47	28	+19	38
4	Independiente	28	12	11	5	41	27	+14	35
5	Chacarita Juniors	28	12	6	10	51	44	+7	30
5	Rosario Central	28	10	10	8	38	31	+7	30
7	Atlanta	28	11	6	11	34	28	+6	28
7	Huracán	28	10	8	10	36	35	+1	28
9	Racing	28	8	10	10	39	41	−2	26
10	Argentinos Juniors	28	8	7	13	46	53	−7	23
11	San Lorenzo	28	7	8	13	39	51	−12	22
11	Ferro Carril Oeste	28	6	10	12	34	52	−18	22
13	Vélez Sársfield	28	5	11	12	35	55	−20	21
14	Estudiantes (LP)	28	5	10	13	34	53	−19	20
15	Quilmes	28	3	7	18	26	62	−36	13

== See also ==
- 1962 in Argentine football
