= Cataldo Spitale =

Argentine-Italian footballer

Personal information
- Date of birth: October 5, 1911
- Place of birth: Rosario, Argentina
- Height: 1.75 m (5 ft 9 in)
- Position: Defender

Senior career*
Years	Team	Apps	(Gls)
1928–1930	Newell's Old Boys		
1931	Boca Juniors	19	(0)
1932	Argentinos Juniors		
1933	River Plate		
1933–1938	Platense	180	(11)
1939–1941	Roma	23	(0)
1941	Gimnasia y Esgrima La Plata	5	(0)
- * Club domestic league appearances and goals

Cataldo Spitale (born October 5, 1911, in Rosario) was an Argentine professional football player. He also held Italian citizenship.

He played for 2 seasons in the Serie A for A.S. Roma (23 games, no goals).
