= Pablo Islas =

Argentine footballer

Personal information
- Full name: Pablo Eduardo Islas
- Date of birth: February 19, 1979 (age 47)
- Place of birth: Buenos Aires, Argentina
- Position: Forward

Senior career*
Years	Team	Apps	(Gls)
2003	FBC Unione Venezia	7	(1)
2005	FC Cartagena	6	(0)
2007–	Club Atlético San Miguel		
- * Club domestic league appearances and goals as of 18:44, 19 April 2010 (UTC)

Pablo Eduardo Islas (born 19 February 1979) is an Argentinian former footballer who last played for Club Atlético San Miguel. He made his Serie B debut with FBC Unione Venezia in the 2003–2004 season.
