= Jorge Rinaldi =

Argentine footballer

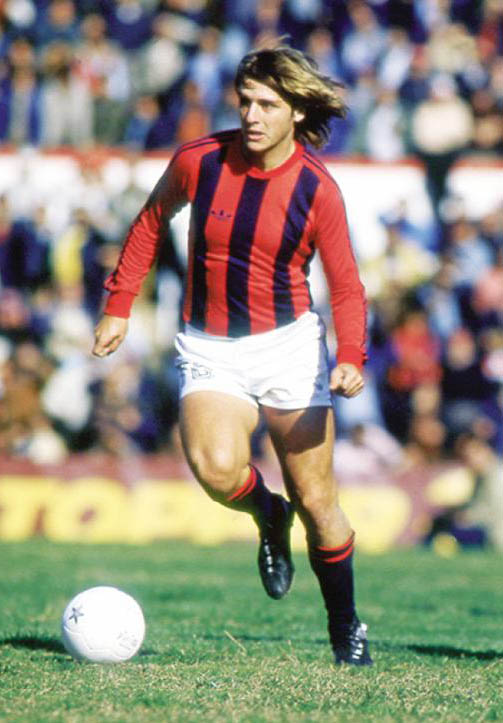
- Rinaldi with San Lorenzo in 1983

Personal information
- Full name: Jorge Roberto Rinaldi
- Date of birth: 23 March 1963 (age 63)
- Place of birth: Buenos Aires, Argentina
- Height: 1.78 m (5 ft 10 in)
- Position: Striker

Senior career*
Years	Team	Apps	(Gls)
1980–1984	San Lorenzo	185	(46)
1985	Sporting de Gijón	7	(0)
1986–1988	Boca Juniors	53	(18)
1988–1989	River Plate	18	(2)
1989–1990	Gençlerbirliği	25	(3)
1990–1992	San Lorenzo	13	(3)

International career
1983–1985	Argentina	14	(0)
- * Club domestic league appearances and goals as of June 2, 2008

Jorge "La Chancha" Rinaldi (born 23 March 1963 in Buenos Aires) is an Argentine retired footballer. He played as a forward for a number of clubs in Argentina, Spain and Turkey and represented the Argentina national football team at international level.

Rinaldi started his professional career with San Lorenzo in 1980 at the age of 17. In 1982, he helped the club to win the Argentine 2nd division and gain promotion back to the Argentine Primera.

In 1985, he joined Sporting de Gijón in Spain, but things did not work out for him there, and he returned to Argentina in early 1986 to play for Boca Juniors.

In 1988, Rinaldi was sold directly to Boca's fiercest rivals, River Plate, making him one of a select band of players to have played for Boca and River.

After one season with River, Rinaldi joined Gençlerbirliği S.K. in Turkey. In 1990, he returned to Argentina and his first club, San Lorenzo, in 1992 it became clear that he was no longer part of the managers plans and he took the difficult decision to retire at the age of only 28.

Since retirement, Rinaldi has held several coaching positions including youth coach and caretaker manager at San Lorenzo and worked as a journalist for Clarín.

His son Leonel Rinaldi is also a footballer.

== Honours ==
San Lorenzo

- Argentine 2nd division: 1982
