= 1962 in Argentine football =

Football in Argentina
- Season: 1962

1962 in Argentine football saw Boca Juniors win the Argentine Primera. Racing Club were Argentina's representatives in the Copa Libertadores where they were eliminated in the first round.

Position	Team	Points	Played	Won	Drawn	Lost	For	Against	Difference
1	Boca Juniors	43	28	18	7	3	45	18	27
2	River Plate	41	28	18	5	5	61	28	33
3	Gimnasia de La Plata	38	28	16	6	6	47	28	19
4	Independiente	35	28	12	11	5	41	27	14
5	Chacarita Juniors	30	28	12	6	10	51	44	7
6	Rosario Central	30	28	10	10	8	38	31	7
7	Atlanta	28	28	11	6	11	34	28	6
8	Huracán	28	28	10	8	10	36	35	1
9	Racing Club	26	28	8	10	10	39	41	-2
10	Argentinos Juniors	23	28	8	7	13	46	53	-7
11	San Lorenzo	22	28	7	8	13	39	51	-12
12	Ferro Carril Oeste	22	28	6	10	12	34	52	-18
13	Vélez Sársfield	21	28	5	11	12	35	55	-20
14	Estudiantes de La Plata	20	28	5	10	13	34	53	-19
15	Quilmes	13	28	3	7	18	26	62	-34

== Topscorer ==
Luis Artime was the top scorer in 1962.

== Relegation ==
Team	Average	1960	1961	1962
River Plate	39.33	39	38	41
Boca Juniors	38.33	37	35	43
Racing Club	36.66	37	47	26
Independiente	36.33	41	33	35
San Lorenzo	32.66	36	40	22
Atlanta	30.66	27	37	28
Gimnasia de La Plata	30.33	25	28	38
Chacarita Juniors	29.66	28	31	30
Argentinos Juniors	28.66	39	24	23
Vélez Sársfield	28.33	33	31	21
Rosario Central	27.33	29	23	30
Huracán	27.00	28	25	28
Estudiantes de La Plata	21.66	23	22	20
Ferro Carril Oeste	20.66	19	21	22
Quilmes	13.00	N/A	N/A	13
