= Julio Toresani =

Argentine footballer and coach (1967–2019)

- Toresani while playing for Unión de Santa Fe

Personal information
- Full name: Julio César Toresani
- Date of birth: 5 December 1967
- Place of birth: Santa Fe, Argentina
- Date of death: 22 April 2019 (aged 51)
- Place of death: Santa Fe, Argentina
- Height: 1.74 m (5 ft 9 in)
- Position: Midfielder

Senior career*
Years	Team	Apps	(Gls)
1986–1989	Unión de Santa Fe	56	(7)
1989–1990	Instituto	30	(9)
1990–1991	Unión de Santa Fe	33	(6)
1991–1995	River Plate	89	(7)
1995–1996	Colón	30	(2)
1996–1997	Boca Juniors	47	(8)
1998–1999	Independiente	22	(2)
1999–2000	Colón	25	(1)
2001–2002	Audax Italiano	22	(3)
2002–2003	Colón	30	(1)
2004	Patronato	0	(0)
Total		384	(45)

Managerial career
- 2005–2006: San Martín de San Juan
- 2006: Colón
- 2007: Aldosivi
- 2009: The Strongest
- 2010–2012: Deportivo Madryn
- 2013: Textil Mandiyú
- 2015: LDU Loja
- 2018: Orense
- 2018–2019: Rampla Juniors
- * Club domestic league appearances and goals

Julio César Toresani (5 December 1967 – 22 April 2019) was an Argentine football midfielder and coach.

== Club career ==
Known as El Huevo ("The Egg"), Toresani played as a right midfielder and was known for his rough playing style. Toresani started his professional career in 1986 at Unión de Santa Fe, a club from his native city. After playing with the club for three years, he moved to the Instituto, where he played for only a year, returning to Unión in 1990. In 1991, Toresani signed with River Plate, playing for four years with the team. In 1996, he moved to Club Atlético Colón (Unión rivals) and in the following year, Toresani signed with Boca Juniors (River Plate's rival). In 1998, the midfielder moved to another Argentinian traditional football team, the Independiente. After one season with them, Toresani moved back to Cólon and then, in 2001, went to play at the Chilean club, Audax Italiano. He returned to Argentina and to Cólon in 2002 and then moved to Patronato where he retired in 2004.

He played for both teams of two sets of rivals: Boca Juniors and River Plate, as well as Colón de Santa Fe and Unión de Santa Fe. He was among the few players to have played for three of the biggest teams in Argentina, having played for River Plate, Boca Juniors and Independiente.

== Managerial career ==
As a coach, Toresani started his career at San Martín de San Juan where he managed the team at the 2005/2006 season. Toresani then went to Colón where he coached the team for only four matches at the beginning of the 2006/2007 season. In 2007, Toresani took over Aldosivi from Mar del Plata, a team which he managed until mid-October of that year, when he was dismissed from his duties. In January 2009, Toresani agreed to relocate to La Paz to be the manager of Bolivian popular team The Strongest. On 31 May 2009, the club announced the rupture of relations with Toresani, after he decided to resign from his responsibilities. He worked for Ecuadorian side LDU Loja in 2015. He was the head coach for Uruguayan club Rampla Juniors between mid-November 2018 and the end of February 2019, when he was fired.

== Death ==
On 22 April 2019, Toresani was found dead at his house. The authorities believe that he committed suicide. According to several sources, Toresani was depressed due to being unemployed and divorcing from his wife. In the last few months, he lived apart from his family and children. His death caused commotion in Argentina, with several athletes, clubs and former teammates lamenting his death.

== Titles ==
Season	Team	Title
Apertura 1991	River Plate	Primera División Argentina
Apertura 1993	River Plate	Primera División Argentina
Apertura 1994	River Plate	Primera División Argentina
