= Gabriel Cedrés =

Uruguayan footballer (born 1970)

Personal information
- Full name: Néstor Gabriel Cedrés Vera
- Date of birth: March 3, 1970 (age 56)
- Place of birth: Minas, Uruguay
- Position: Striker

Senior career*
Years	Team	Apps	(Gls)
1988–1993	Peñarol	?	(?)
1994	Argentinos Juniors	16	(4)
1994–1996	River Plate	72	(9)
1996–1997	Boca Juniors	28	(8)
1997–1998	América	29	(4)
1998–2005	Peñarol	219	(53)
2005–2006	River Plate MVD	16	(4)
2006	Montevideo Wanderers	11	(0)
2007	Deportivo Maldonado	15	(4)
2007	Defensor de Maldonado		
2008	San Carlos		
2008	Barrio Olímpico (Minas)		
2009	San Carlos		

International career
1990–2000	Uruguay	28	(5)
- * Club domestic league appearances and goals as of March 2008

Néstor Gabriel Cedrés Vera (born March 3, 1970, in Minas) is a Uruguayan footballer. He has played for various teams in Uruguay, Argentina and Mexico.

== Playing career ==
Season	Club	Level
1988–1993	Peñarol	Primera División Uruguaya
1994	Argentinos Juniors	Primera Division Argentina
1994–1996	River Plate	Primera Division Argentina
1997	Boca Juniors	Primera Division Argentina
1997–1998	Club América	Primera División de México
1998–2005	Peñarol	Primera División Uruguaya
2006	River Plate de Montevideo	Primera División Uruguaya
2006–2007	Montevideo Wanderers	Primera División Uruguaya

== Titles ==
Title	Club
Primera División Uruguaya 1993	Peñarol
Apertura 1994	River Plate
Copa Libertadores 1996	River Plate
Primera División Uruguaya 1999	Peñarol
Primera División Uruguaya 2003	Peñarol
