= CR Flamengo =

Brazilian football club

Flamengo
- Full name: Clube de Regatas do Flamengo
- Nicknames: Rubro-Negro (Scarlet and Black); Mengão (Big Mengo); Malvadão (The Evil One); Urubu (Vulture); O Mais Querido (The Most Beloved)
- Founded: 17 November 1895; 131 years ago (rowing club); 24 December 1911; 114 years ago (football department)
- Stadium: Maracanã
- Capacity: 78,838
- Coordinates: 22°54′44″S 43°13′49″W
- President: Luiz Eduardo Baptista
- Head coach: Leonardo Jardim
- League: Campeonato Brasileiro Série A Campeonato Carioca
- 2025 2025: Série A, 1st of 20; Carioca, 1st of 12
- Website: flamengo.com.br
Home colors	Away colors	Third colors

Clube de Regatas do Flamengo (Brazilian Portuguese: [ˈklubi dʒi ʁeˈɡataz du flaˈmẽɡu]; lit. 'Flamengo Rowing Club'), more commonly referred to as simply Flamengo, is a Brazilian multi-sports club based in Rio de Janeiro, in the neighborhood of Gávea. It was founded in and named after the Flamengo neighborhood in 1895, and is best known for its professional football team. Flamengo is one of two clubs to have never been relegated from Brazil's top division, along with São Paulo, and the most popular football club in Brazil with more than 46.9 million fans, equivalent to 21.9% of the population of Brazil.

The club was first established in 1895 specifically as a rowing club in the Flamengo neighborhood and did not play its first official football match until 1912. Flamengo's traditional uniform features red and black striped shirts with white shorts, and red and black striped socks. Flamengo has typically played its home matches in the Maracanã Stadium (which also often hosts the Brazil national team) since its completion in 1950. Since 1969, the vulture (Portuguese: urubu) has been the mascot of Flamengo.

Flamengo is Brazil's richest and most valuable football club with an annual revenue of R$1.2 billion (€218 million) and a valuation of over R$5,096 billion (€800 million). Flamengo is the non-European football club with the most followers on social media, with 65 million followers across all platforms as of 2 December 2025, and also the most successful Brazilian team of the 21st century so far. The club is also one of the most successful in Brazilian football, having amassed a considerable array of national and international titles.

The clubs's training center, officially known as "Ninho do Urubu" ("Vulture's Nest"), is located in Vargem Grande, Rio de Janeiro. It serves as the primary training facility for the Flamengo football club, housing its professional teams and youth academy. Flamengo's youth academy is one of the most prolific in Brazil and in the world, having developed a number of Brazilian internationals such as Zico, Zizinho, Vinícius Júnior, Lucas Paquetá, Júlio César, Adriano, Mário Zagallo, Júnior and Leonardo.

Flamengo has also been well represented in the Brazil national team; at the 1938 FIFA World Cup, forward Leônidas da Silva, a Flamengo player at the time, was the Golden Boot winner with 7 goals and won the Golden Ball, thus becoming the first Brazilian player ever to win those two awards. Twelve years later at the 1950 World Cup, Zizinho, a midfielder for Flamengo, also won the Golden Ball after he was voted best player. Four out of the ten top scorers for Brazil have been Flamengo players at one point in their careers, seven players have won the World Cup whilst playing for Flamengo, and Flamengo player Mário Zagallo scored Brazil's third goal in the 1958 World Cup final.

== History ==
=== Establishment of the club (1895–1912) ===
Flamengo was founded on 17 November 1895, by a group of rowers gathered at club member Nestor de Barros's manor on Flamengo Beach in Rio de Janeiro. In the late 19th century, rowing was the most played sport in the city. Previously, they could only afford a used boat named Pherusa, which had to be completely rebuilt before it could be used in competition. The team debuted on 6 October 1895, when they sailed off the Caju Point toward Flamengo Beach. However, strong winds turned over the boat and the rowers nearly drowned. They were rescued by a fishing boat named Leal (Loyal). Later as the Pherusa was undergoing repairs, it was stolen and never found again. The group saved money to buy a new boat, the Etoile, renamed Scyra.

On the night of 17 November, the group gathered at Nestor de Barros's manor on Flamengo beach and founded the Grupo de Regatas do Flamengo (English: Flamengo Rowing Group) and elected its first board and president (Domingos Marques de Azevedo). The name was changed a few weeks later to its current title of Clube de Regatas do Flamengo (Flamengo Rowing Club). The founders decided that the anniversary of the club's foundation should be commemorated on 15 November to coincide with Republic Proclamation Day, a national holiday.

Flamengo's football team was only established after a group of ten dissatisfied players from Fluminense broke away from that club following a board dispute. The players decided to join Flamengo because Alberto Borgerth, the team's captain, was also a rower for Flamengo. Also, establishing a land sports department at Flamengo was preferable to joining football rivals Botafogo or the all-English club Paissandu. The new members were admitted on 8 November 1911. A motion against the club taking part in football tournaments was put to a vote but was defeated, and as a result the members officially established the club's new football department on 24 December 1911.

=== Football in the amateur era (1912–1933) ===
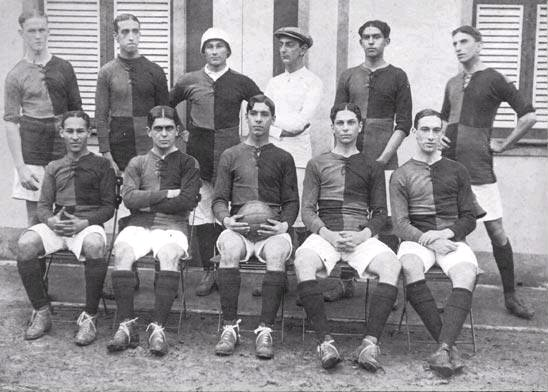
The recently formed football team before a match vs. Paissandu, 1912

The new team trained on Russel Beach and gradually gained the support of the locals, who closely watched their practice matches. The first official match was played on 3 May 1912, and marked, to this day, the largest margin of victory in the club's history, as they defeated Mangueira 16–2. Flamengo's first ever match against Fluminense, the start of the Fla-Flu rivalry, was played on 7 July of that year and was won by Fluminense by a score of 3–2. That same year, Flamengo finished as runners-up of the Campeonato Carioca, the Rio de Janeiro State Championship. The team's first uniform was nicknamed the "papagaio vintém", due to its similarity to a particular type of kite.

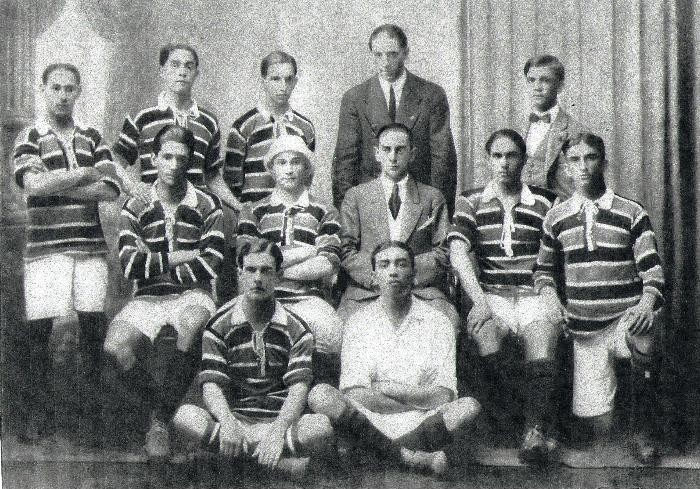
The Flamengo team of 1914, when the club won its first Carioca championship

In 1914 the club won the Campeonato Carioca for the first time, dressed in a red, black, and white-striped shirt nicknamed the "cobra coral" (coral snake) was worn until 1916. Flamengo won the Campeonato Carioca again the following year, in 1915, and secured their first back-to-back championship; something they also did with their titles in 1920 and 1921.

In 1925, the team won the Campeonato Carioca and five other tournaments, a record at the time. In 1927 the prominent Rio newspaper Jornal do Brasil, in partnership with a mineral water company, held a mail-in contest to find "the most beloved club in Brazil." Though Flamengo enjoyed their largest increase in fan support after the club professionalized in the 1930s, they still defeated popular rivals Vasco da Gama in the vote. This was the first of many times that Flamengo would be voted as the nation's most popular club, inspiring the nickname "o mais querido do Brasil" ("the most beloved of Brazil"). In 1933 the team went on its first tour outside Brazil (to Montevideo and Buenos Aires) and on 14 May of the same year played its final match as an amateur team, defeating River Futebol Clube by a score of 16–2. After this, the club's football department became professional.

=== Early professional era (1934–1955) ===
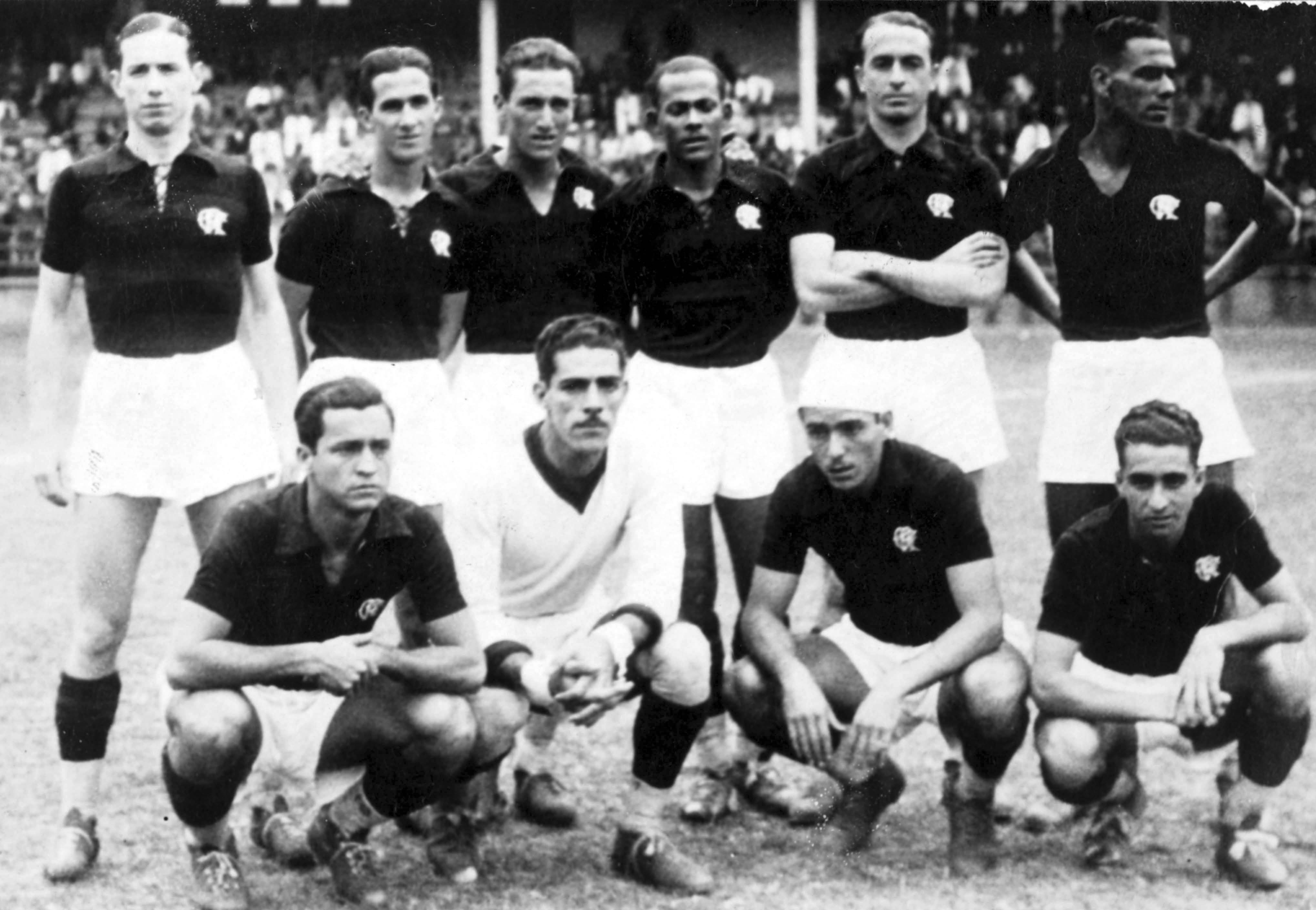
Flamengo's team, 1934. National Archives of Brazil

Local advertiser José Bastos Padilha was elected club president in 1934 and served until 1937. Under his tenure, the club massively improved its popularity in both Rio de Janeiro and the entirety of Brazil. For publicity, he organized a contest for students in schools to create phrases describing Flamengo, from which the phrase uma vez Flamengo, Flamengo até morrer ("Once you are Flamengo, you are Flamengo 'til you die") was developed and would later be adopted as part of the club's anthem. In 1936 Padilha signed excellent players such as Domingos da Guia and Leônidas da Silva (who would go on to be the leading goalscorer in the 1938 FIFA World Cup as a Flamengo player). These beloved players endeared Flamengo to the public and it is believed that by this time Flamengo was the most popular club in the country. In 1937 Flamengo hired Hungarian coach Izidor "Dori" Kürschner, who introduced the WM system to Brazil and other innovations from Europe such as training without the use of the ball and playing a more defensive, controlled style. Padilha facilitated the construction of Flamengo's new stadium and current training center, the Estádio da Gávea. The stadium was inaugurated on 4 September 1938, when Vasco da Gama defeated Flamengo 2–0 and Kürschner was promptly fired.

In 1938, the five-year split in Rio de Janeiro football over the dispute between professionalism and amateurism was resolved with the merger of the two competing leagues (Flamengo had been a member of the professional LCF – Liga Carioca de Football). In 1939, after twelve years without winning any titles, Flamengo conquered the state championship with a team that would become the basis of the three-time state champions in the 1940s.

In 1941, the group played its first international competition, the Hexagonal Tournament of Argentina. In 1942, the first organized supporters group in all of Brazil, Charanga Rubro-Negra, was founded in support of Flamengo. Flamengo's popularity grew incidentally during World War II when Brazil's allies, the United States, installed two high-powered antennas in Natal and Belém in the north of Brazil to intercept enemy radio signals. They also allowed residents in the North and Northeast regions to receive the radio broadcasts of football matches. As Rio de Janeiro was the national capital at the time and Flamengo was highly successful in the war years with Zizinho and Domingos da Guia, nationwide support increased. In 1944, Flamengo completed their first tricampeonato Carioca: three consecutive Rio de Janeiro state titles (winning the 1942, 1943, and 1944 competitions). The key player of this squad was Zizinho, a player developed at Flamengo and considered the first ever "idol" of the club. Zizinho was transferred to Bangu just before the start of the 1950 World Cup in Brazil, where he scored twice and the Seleção finished runners-up. From 1953 to 1955, Flamengo once again won the Rio de Janeiro State League three consecutive times.

=== Zico and the world champions (1974–1983) ===

1981 Intercontinental Cup starting lineup

Flamengo won their 18th Campeonato Carioca state championship in 1978. The following five years would come to represent the club's most glorious era. Brazilian stars like Júnior, Carpegiani, Adílio, Cláudio Adão and Tita were led by Zico to become state champions three times in a row – the club's third tri-championship. This run of sustained excellent play pushed Flamengo towards its first Brazilian Championship in 1980. As national champions, the club qualified to play in the South American continental tournament, the 1981 Copa Libertadores, for the first time.

The 1981 season was a benchmark year in Flamengo's history. They advanced through the semi-final group stage of the Copa Libertadores with four victories in four matches. In the final they encountered Chilean club Cobreloa, also making its Copa Libertadores debut. In the first final at the Maracanã, Flamengo prevailed (2–1) with two goals from Zico. At the National Stadium in Santiago the following week, the Brazilian team received a violent reception on the field and fell 1–0 to a free kick. Equal on goals, a third match was played at the neutral venue of the Estadio Centenario in Montevideo. Zico scored twice in the first half, sealing the game and the championship. Flamengo were crowned champions of South America on 23 November and qualified for the Intercontinental Cup, a single match to be played in Tokyo's Olympic Stadium against European Champions' Cup winner Liverpool F.C..

On 13 December 1981, Zico, Tita, and Nunes took the field for the most important match in the club's history. Two goals by Nunes and one by Adílio (all in the first half) along with a brilliant midfield performance by Zico earned Flamengo the title of first Brazilian World Champions since Pelé's Santos, shutting out Liverpool 3–0.

The following two years were also marked with success. One more Rio de Janeiro State Championship in 1981 and two back-to-back Brazilian Championships – 1982 and 1983 – closed Flamengo's "Golden Age."

=== National success and the return of Zico (1984–1994) ===
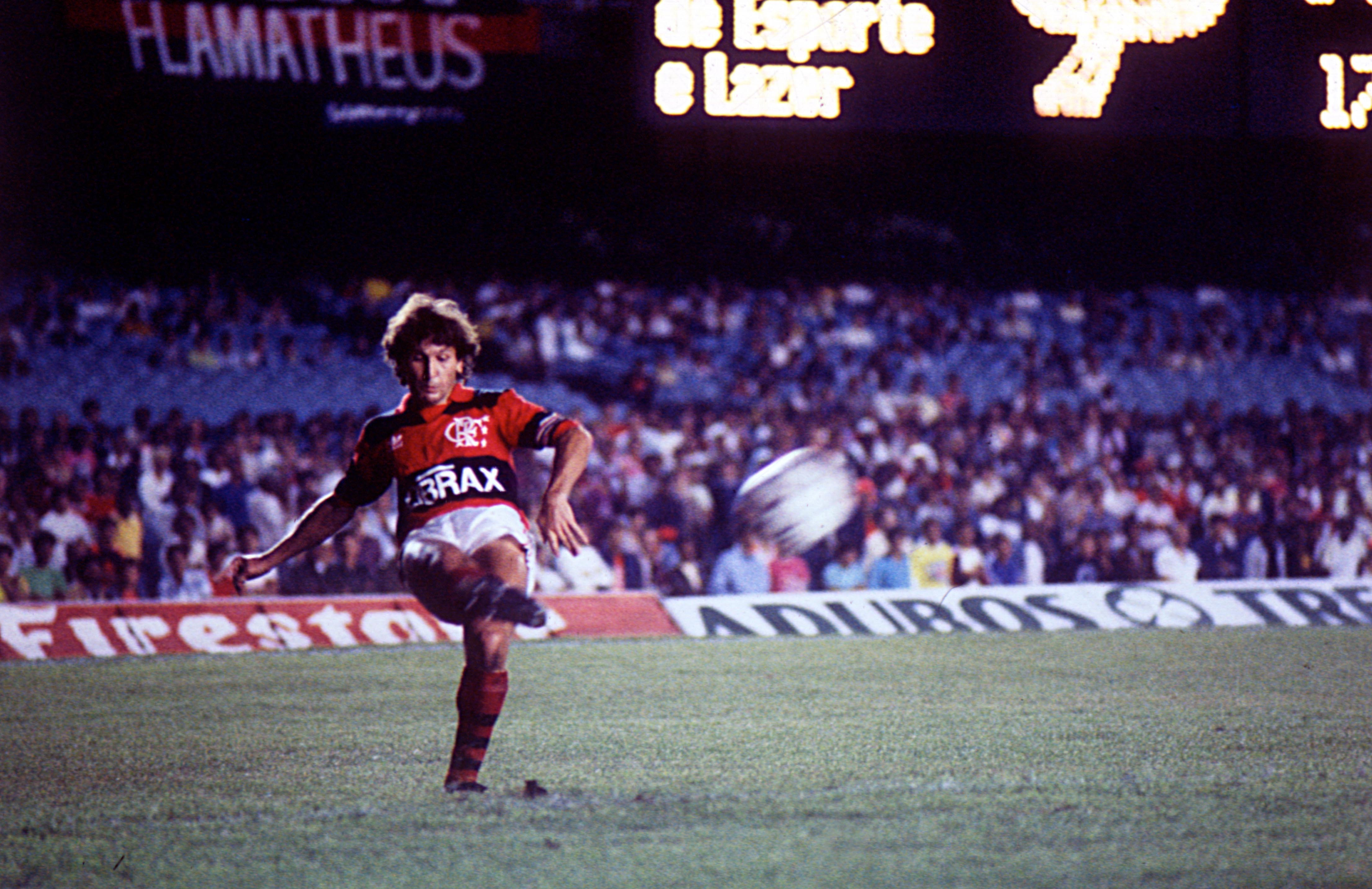
Zico played for Flamengo from 1971 to 1983 and 1985–89, setting several records for the club.

After spending two years in Italy playing for Udinese, Zico returned to Flamengo in 1986 and won his last state championship. Only one month after returning, he suffered a severe knee injury after a violent tackle from Bangu defender Marcio Nunes, which interrupted his career for several months and affected his form in the 1986 FIFA World Cup.

In 1987, Zico was a major contributor to Flamengo's victory in the first edition of the Copa União. That year, the CBF was experiencing serious financial and institutional crises and was unable to secure sponsorship to organize the national championship as in years prior. As a result, the thirteen biggest clubs in Brazil (which included Flamengo) reacted and created a new entity named the Club of 13 to organize a championship of their own. The CBF originally supported the decision by the Club of 13, but were pressured by other clubs to create a larger national tournament. As a result, CBF placed three additional clubs into the Copa União, regarded the Copa União as the "Green Module", and organized a second "Yellow Module" of 16 other teams. CBF then decided that for the 1987 Brazilian Championship, the winners and runners-up of both modules would face each other in a knockout-style cup to determine the national champion and qualification for the Copa Libertadores, although this decision was made after the beginning of the championship, without Club of 13 agreement. With strong performances from Zico, Zé Carlos, Renato Gaúcho and Bebeto, Flamengo conquered the Copa União with major victories over Internacional and Atlético Mineiro. However, there was a dispute over whether Flamengo and Internacional of the Green Module would dispute the quadrangular against Sport Recife and Guarani of the Yellow Module. The Club of 13 clubs had agreed to not participate in the final set up by the CBF, since it was decided while the matches were already being played, but Eurico Miranda, a representative of Vasco, Flamengo's archi-rival and member of the Club of 13, had already signed an agreement with CBF regarding the final, without the board consent. Flamengo still did not participate in the final under the understanding that it would only determine the entrants of the Copa Libertadores and not the Brazilian national champion. CBF officially recognized Sport as the sole champion in 1987 and they qualified to the Copa Libertadores. In 2011, CBF retroactively declared Flamengo champion of 1987. However, Sport later appealed the decision to a Common Justice Tribunal, which is prohibited by FIFA, and CBF ultimately declared Sport as the sole champion of that year, pending appeals from Flamengo, all of which were unsuccessful, and a few years later Sport was officially declared as the champion of the 1987 season.

Throughout his career at Flamengo, Zico scored 508 goals and was the top scorer in club history before retiring in 1990.

Even without its biggest star, the early years of the post-Zico era were successful for Flamengo. They achieved national victory in the second edition of the Copa do Brasil in 1990, defeating Goiás in the finals. In 1992, Flamengo won their fifth Campeonato Brasileiro, defeating Botafogo across two legs in the final (3–0, 2–2). The team's key player was again Júnior at 38 years old.

=== Mediocre campaigns and relegation escapes (1995–2005) ===
After winning the Brazilian League title in 1992, the club entered a major financial crisis and domestic and international achievements became less frequent, although the team still won trophies ranked less in importance. In 1993, Flamengo lost the Supercopa Libertadores finals to Sao Paulo. In 1995, the year of Flamengo's centenary, radio sports broadcaster Kléber Leite became chairman of the club and signed striker Romário, the current FIFA World Player of the Year, from Barcelona. He joined Sávio and later Edmundo to become, as the supporters called, "the attack of dreams". Even with Romário and other stars, Flamengo's centennial year did not yield major trophies, and the club struggled in the league, finishing 21st of 24. Flamengo only won the Taça Guanabara, the first phase of the state league, and finished runners-up of 1995 Supercopa Libertadores. However, in 1996, Flamengo went undefeated in the Campeonato Carioca. Sávio was the top scorer and best player in Flamengo's victorious 1996 Copa de Oro campaign. The Copa de Oro was Flamengo's first international success since 1981, their third overall international title.

In 1997 Flamengo finished trophyless for one of the few times in its history, but overall had a good season, finishing fifth in the Serie A, finishing runner-up to Grêmio in the Copa do Brasil on away goals, and finishing runner-up in the Torneo Rio-Sao Paulo. 1998 was another trophyless season, but far worse than 1997; Mengão finished 11th in the Serie A, were knocked out of the Copa do Brasil with a 5–0 loss to Vitoria, and failed to advance out of the group stages of the Copa Mercosur, although top scorer Romario continued to show individual brilliance with 35 goals from 40 appearances.

In 1999, Edmundo dos Santos Silva was elected club president, and brought with him a massive contract with sports marketing company ISL. Despite a mediocre campaign in that year's Campeonato Brasileiro, finishing 12th, the club lifted the 1999 Copa Mercosur at Estádio Palestra Itália after beating Palmeiras 7–6 on aggregate in an exciting two legged final, and were successful at the regional level, winning the Campeonato Carioca over rivals Vasco, who had won the 1998 Copa Libertadores.

2000 was also a mediocre year for the club, being knocked out of the Copa Mercosur by River Plate in the quarter-finals, and exiting the Copa do Brasil with a heavy 8–2 aggregate loss to Santos. However the club were successful at the regional level again, beating Vasco 5–1 on aggregate for a back-to-back championship.

In 2001 league play, Flamengo avoided relegation to the Série B by beating Palmeiras 2–0 on the final matchday. Despite near relegation, the club had a decent season overall; they won the 2001 Copa dos Campeões inter-state title, finished runner up in the 2001 Copa Mercosur to San Lorenzo on penalties, and beat Vasco again in the state league with a late free-kick goal by Dejan Petković. With the state title, the club became tricampeão (three-time champion) for the fourth time in its history (1999-2000-2001) .

In 2002, ISL went bankrupt, for reasons unrelated to their contract with Flamengo, and the club was left without its wealthy partner. In the same year, Edmundo Santos Silva was removed from his role as president in a controversial manner amidst accusation of impropriety. Lacking the funds to make key signings, Flamengo failed to field competitive teams and narrowly avoided relegation in the 2002, 2004, and 2005 campaigns, with the 2005 season being one of the worst in Flamengo's history; the club only escaped relegation after the arrival of coach Joel Santana, who directed the team to six wins and three draws in nine matches played under his command. Twice in this low period, the team reached back-to-back Copa do Brasil finals, in 2003 and 2004, ultimately falling to Cruzeiro and Santo André respectively. This Flamengo has also evaded massive taxes in the Banestado scandal.

=== End of title drought (2006–2018) ===
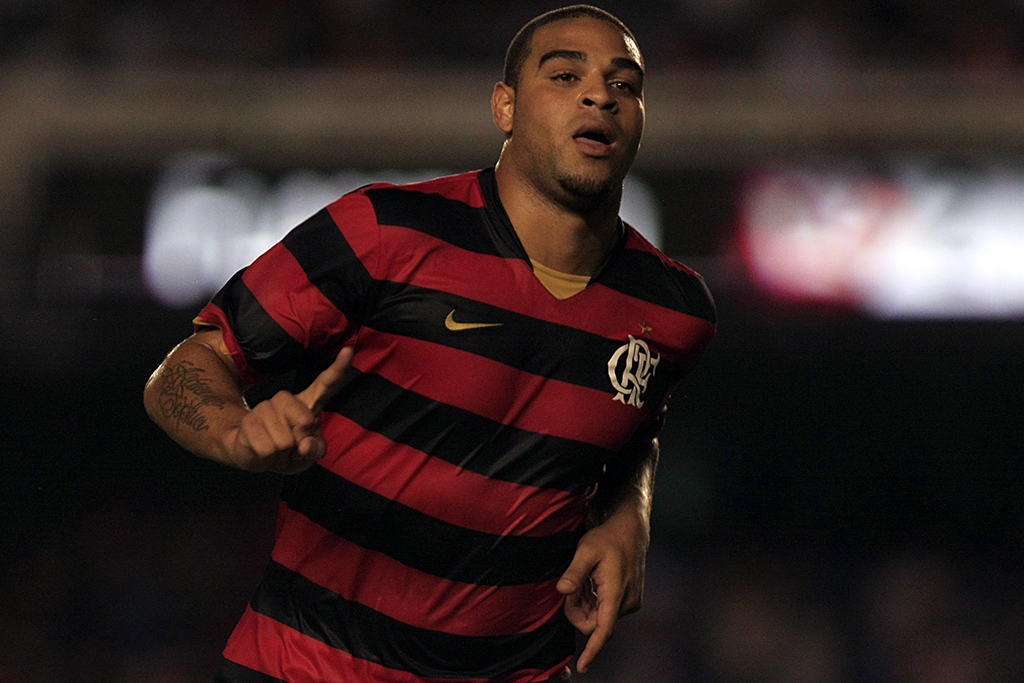
Adriano celebrating a goal for Flamengo. In 2009 he finished as joint top-scorer in Série A with 19 goals.

In 2006, Flamengo reached the Copa do Brasil final for a fifth time, finally managing to conquer the title after losing three previous finals, this time beating rivals Vasco da Gama. From 2007 to 2009 Flamengo completed their fifth tricampeonato in the Campeonato Carioca, and became sole owners of the record for most Carioca titles with 31 (Fluminense had 30 at the time).

On 9 March 2007, Flamengo received a commemorative date on the Rio de Janeiro official calendar. Governor Sérgio Cabral Filho declared 17 November (the day the club was founded) "Flamengo Day".

In the 2007 Copa Libertadores, after a near-perfect group stage where the club was undefeated, expectations were high for the team. However, the club was eliminated by Uruguayan minnows Defensor Sporting in the first knockout round. In the Campeonato Brasileiro, Flamengo spent most of the season in mid table but in the last five matchdays climbed to second place, before being defeated by Náutico 1–0 in the final round and ultimately ending the season third, which was good enough for a spot in the following year's Copa Libertadores.

In the 2008 Copa Libertadores, Flamengo began their campaign by topping their group. After defeating Club América 4–2 at Estadio Azteca, in what was Flamengo's first tournament tie against a Mexican club, Flamengo looked to be one of the strongest sides in the competition. However, Flamengo polemically lost the second leg at home 3–0 and were eliminated in the round of 16 again, in what was Joel Santana's final match with the club. In the Brasileirao, Flamengo finished fifth, and in 2009 despite being in tenth place in midseason, Flamengo won the league title for the first time since 1992. With this victory Flamengo became five-time league champions, seventeen seasons after their last title. The 2009 championship team finished the season with 67 points, the lowest winning point total in Brazil since the current league format was established in 2003. Flamengo were champions despite spending only two rounds at the top of the league: the final two, and the title was won after a dramatic 2–1 comeback victory against Grêmio in the final round.

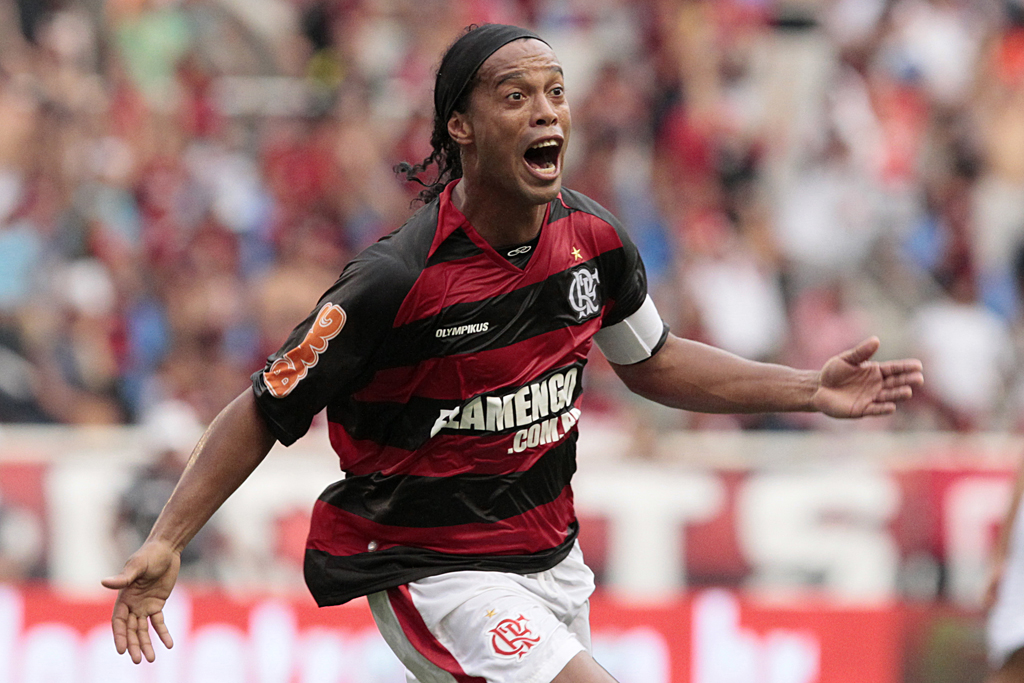
Ronaldinho celebrates scoring for Flamengo in February 2011.

Flamengo experienced a poor run in Série A from 2010 to 2015, finishing better than tenth only once. Following the success of 2009, the club gambled on winning several titles and signed striker Vágner Love to form a pair with Adriano. The dream of repeating as state champions four times in a row was foiled by Botafogo in 2010. After narrowly qualifying out of the group stage in the Copa Libertadores, manager Andrade was still fired. In their first quarter-final appearance since 1993, after disposing of Corinthians, Flamengo were eliminated by Universidad de Chile on away goals. Shortly after, Vágner Love and Adriano left the team. A series of coaching changes during the troublesome domestic league saw Flamengo survive relegation, avoiding defeat in their final nine matches, and claim the final berth to the Copa Sudamericana under manager Vanderlei Luxemburgo.

The blockbuster signing of 2011 was 30-year-old superstar Ronaldinho from A.C. Milan. He was joined by Argentine Darío Bottinelli and Fluminense idol Thiago Neves. Flamengo won the Campeonato Carioca outright in an undefeated campaign, but captured no other trophies that season: eliminations in the Copa do Brasil by Ceará, a heavy 5–0 loss in the Sudamericana by Universidad de Chile, and a fourth-place finish in the league left fans feeling that a strong roster had been squandered. The season saw the retirement of Serbian club idol Dejan Petković as well. In 2012 Ronaldinho sued Flamengo claiming lack of payment for four months and canceled his contract with the club, Thiago Neves returned to Fluminense, and defender Alex Silva was loaned to Cruzeiro after threatening Flamengo with a lawsuit. Vágner Love and Ibson returned for a 2012 campaign that was worse than 2011: no trophies, a group-stage exit from the Copa Libertadores, and an 11th place finish in the Brasileirao.

At the end of 2012, Flamengo elected Eduardo Bandeira de Mello as club president for three years. The goal of his term was to improve the club's finances, after an independent audit assessed Flamengo's debt at R$750 million. After a typical series of managerial changes, Jayme de Almeida was appointed as interim manager during which he fought off relegation and won the 2013 Copa do Brasil final against Atlético Paranaense. It was Flamengo's third Copa title, after 1990 and 2006.

Flamengo's Copa do Brasil title-defense fell short to Atlético Mineiro in the semi-final. However, by 2014, Flamengo was the only club that successfully reduced their debt over the year (down to R$600 million) and recorded the highest annual profit. In 2015 after an inconsistent start to the Carioca and national league seasons, multiple managers were dismissed and Flamengo failed to qualify for the Libertadores. However, Flamengo had signed Paolo Guerrero and Ederson and were the most valuable club in Brazil with debt now reduced to R$495 million. As a result, president Bandeira was re-elected. The club signed fan-favorite Diego in the mid-season and mounted a strong campaign, but could not catch Palmeiras in 2016 and finished third in the league table.

2017 was characterized as the year Flamengo played two major finals at the end of the season but failed to win either. After going undefeated in the 2017 Campeonato Carioca, they were eliminated in the Copa Libertadores group stage, failing to win a single match away from home but qualifying for the Copa Sudamericana in third place. In the Copa do Brasil, the club reached the final where they lost in a penalty shootout to Cruzeiro. Less than three months later, they reached an unprecedented Copa Sudamericana final. They lost away to Independiente and drew at home 1–1, losing the title. After the match, a group of Flamengo supporters rioted outside the hotel where Independiente were staying. CONMEBOL punished the club with two closed-door home matches in the following Copa Libertadores. In the league, the club finished sixth and qualified for the following year's Libertadores.

Nine years after their last Campeonato Brasileiro victory, Flamengo made a title run but fell just short. In 2018 they spent the most rounds as league leader (thirteen) and broke their points record from 2016 (71), but finished runners-up behind Palmeiras. In the Libertadores, after an undefeated group stage, they qualified to the round of 16, where they were eliminated by Cruzeiro. That season, the club recorded their two highest outgoing transfer fees in history: 18-year-old winger Vinícius Júnior moved to Real Madrid in July for €46 million, and 20-year-old midfielder Lucas Paquetá transferred to A.C. Milan for a reported €35 million at the end of the year. Both were products of Flamengo's youth academy.

=== New glory (2019–present) ===
==== 2019 season ====

2019 Copa Libertadores Final starting lineup

On the morning of 8 February 2019 a fire erupted at Flamengo's Centro de Treinamento George Helal, commonly known as the Ninho do Urubu training center. The fire resulted in the deaths of ten academy players between the ages of 14 and 17 training with the club. Three others were injured. The cause of the fire was a malfunctioning air-conditioning unit that caught fire in the room of one of the victims close to 5:00 am. President Rodolfo Landim described it as "the worst tragedy the club has ever experienced in its 123 years." The governor of the state of Rio de Janeiro declared a three-day period of mourning following the tragedy. Since then, Flamengo fans have sung during the tenth minute of every Flamengo home game in memory of the ten children who died in the tragedy.

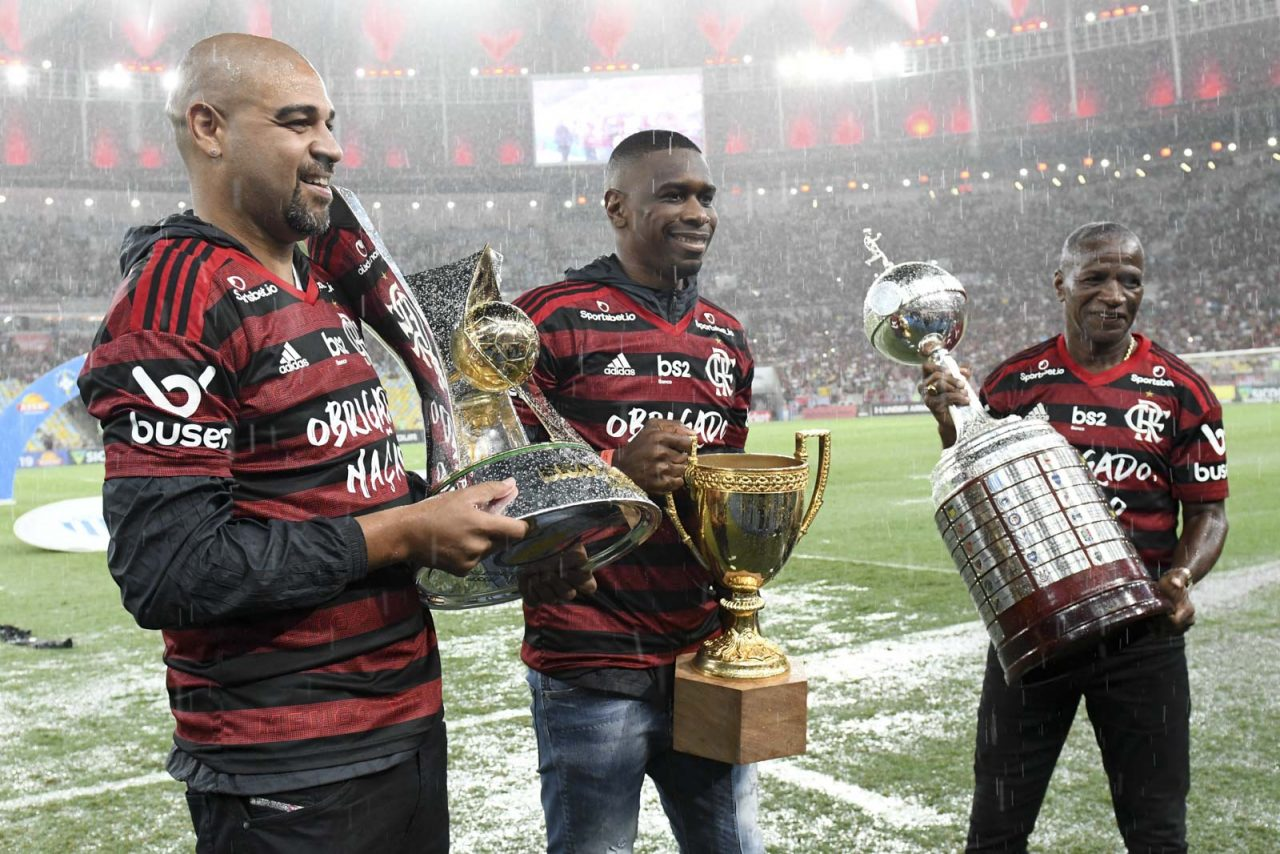
Adriano, Juan and Adílio, great players of the club, holding the 2019 Campeonato Brasileiro Série A, Copa Libertadores and Campeonato Carioca trophies.

The 2019 season marked the most successful one in the club's footballing history. At the end of 2018, Rodolfo Landim was elected club president for a three-year term. Flamengo paid the most expensive incoming transfer fee for a player in Brazilian football history, signing Giorgian de Arrascaeta from Cruzeiro for R$63 million (€14.5 million). In January the club signed forward Bruno Henrique from Santos and secured the loan of striker Gabriel Barbosa from Inter Milan.

After advancing out of the Copa Libertadores group stage, manager Abel Braga resigned and Flamengo hired Portuguese manager Jorge Jesus. Europe-based players Rafinha, Filipe Luís, Pablo Marí and Gerson were added to play alongside Flamengo's other record signings. After qualifying to their first Copa Libertadores semi-final since 1984, Flamengo defeated Grêmio 5–0 in their home leg at the Maracanã to advance their first Copa Libertadores final since 1981. For the first time in Copa Libertadores history, the final was played as a single match in a neutral venue. On 23 November 2019, at the Estadio Monumental in Lima, Peru against defending champions River Plate, Flamengo trailed 0–1 in the final minutes before Gabriel scored twice to secure the 2–1 victory.

Less than 24 hours later, Flamengo became champions of the Campeonato Brasileiro Série A for the first time since 2009 with four matches in hand after a loss by Palmeiras to Grêmio in the 34th round. Flamengo became only the second Brazilian club to win their state championship (2019 Campeonato Carioca), Campeonato Brasileiro, and Copa Libertadores in the same season, after Pelé's 1962 Santos team. Flamengo's 2019 campaign under Jorge Jesus' leadership broke a number of records in the Campeonato Brasileiro's 20-team double round-robin era (2006–present): most points (90), most wins (28), most goals scored (86), best goal differential (+49), longest undefeated streak (24 matches), most points clear of runners-up (16) and most goals by a single player (25 from Gabriel Barbosa).

Flamengo participated in the FIFA Club World Cup for the first time in the club's history in 2019 in Qatar. The club defeated Al Hilal SFC 3–1 in the semi-final, but lost 0–1 to Liverpool in the final.

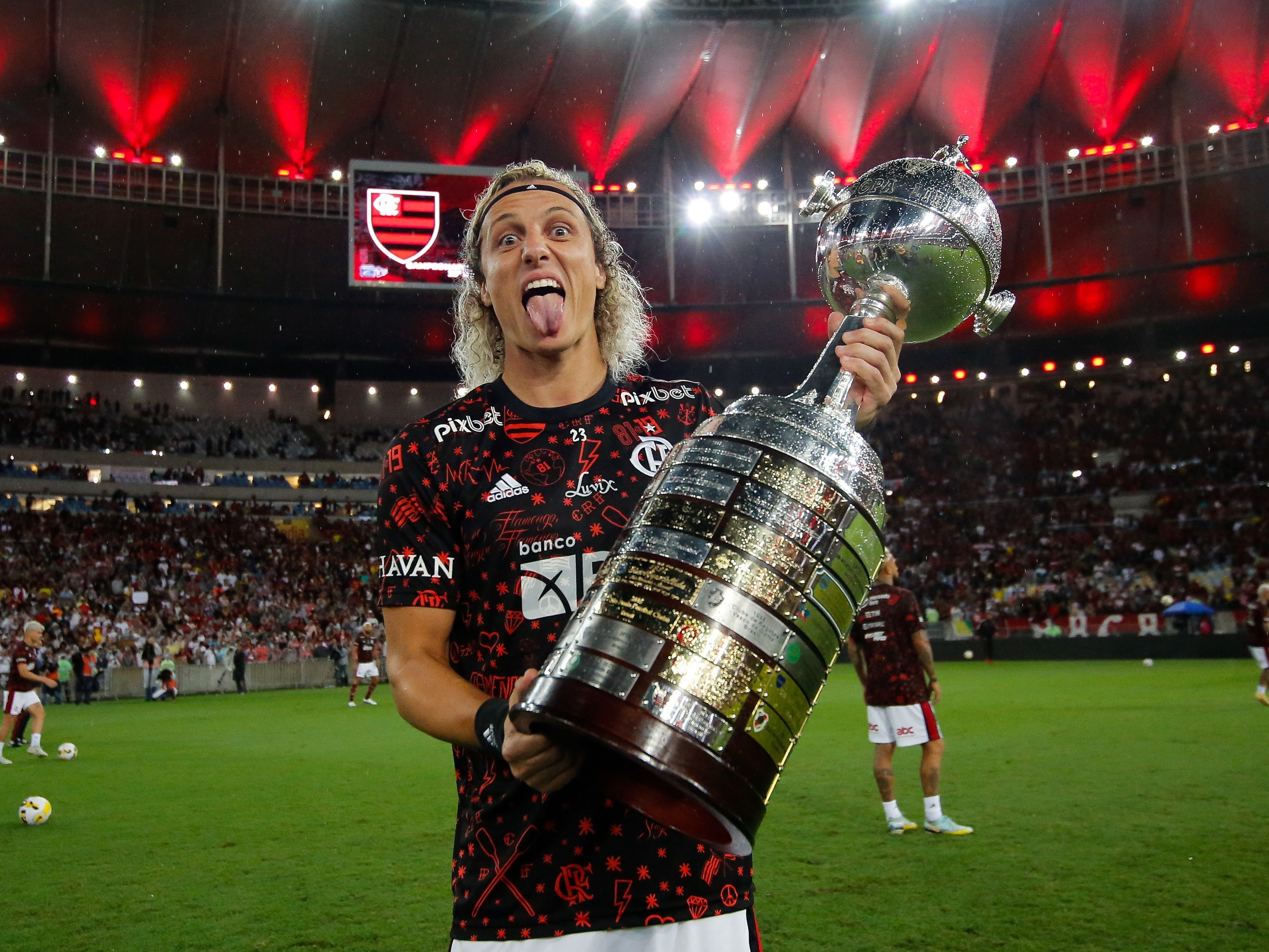
David Luiz holding the 2022 Copa Libertadores trophy.

==== 2020 season ====
After winning the revived Supercopa do Brasil against Athletico Paranaense, then the Recopa Sudamericana against Copa Sudamericana champions Independiente del Valle, and the 2020 Campeonato Carioca, in July 2020 Jorge Jesus departed from Flamengo to return to Benfica, having won five titles in Brazil. Jesus's successor was former Pep Guardiola assistant Domènec Torrent, but his tenure was brief and he was replaced with Rogério Ceni in November 2020. Ceni led Flamengo to a second consecutive Campeonato Brasileiro championship, finishing one point ahead of Internacional.

==== 2021 season ====
In 2021 Ceni led Flamengo to a third consecutive Campeonato Carioca, but was released after four losses in Flamengo's first ten Campeonato Brasileiro Série A matches. The club signed Renato Gaúcho as manager, who brought strong results in league play and took Flamengo back to the Copa Libertadores Final against Palmeiras, but lost 2–1 in extra time on 27 November 2021. He and the club parted ways after.

==== 2022 season ====

2022 Copa Libertadores Final starting lineup

In 2022, after a difficult start to the year under manager Paulo Sousa (runners-up in the Campeonato Carioca and Supercopa do Brasil), Dorival Júnior returned to Flamengo and brought another wave of glory. The team advanced to the finals of the Copa do Brasil against Corinthians. In the second leg in the Maracanã, tied 1–1 on aggregate, Flamengo were victorious in the penalty shootout with Rodinei scoring the winner. This was Flamengo's fourth Copa do Brasil championship and first since 2013. Later that month on 29 October 2022, Flamengo faced Athletico Paranaense in Guayaquil, Ecuador for the final of the Copa Libertadores. Gabriel Barbosa scored the only goal of the match and Flamengo claimed their second Copa Libertadores in four years, and third overall.

== Team image ==
=== Crest ===
Flamengo's crest has changed slightly throughout the club's history. Most of the changes have been modifications to the design of the monogram, with the latest redesign being unveiled in 2018.

The club uses three crests in different situations: the full crest is used as the club's official logo, the rowing crest is used for all rowing related uniforms and equipment, and the white "CRF" monogram is typically the only component of the crest worn on the primary football uniform. It bears a remarkable resemblance to the "RFC" monogram traditionally used by Scottish club Rangers F.C..

Beginning in 1980, Flamengo wore three white stars aligned vertically along the side of their monogram crest to indicate their three state league tri-championships (1942–43–44, 1953–54–55, and 1978–79–79 Special). When Nike became Flamengo's kit provider in 2000, their first kit featured the full shield crest with three stars above it for the first time. After the fourth state league tri-championship (1999-2000-2001) and to commemorate the 20th anniversary of the 1981 Copa Libertadores and Intercontinental Cup championships, a fourth white star and a gold star were introduced above the crest. Since 2005 the club uses only the gold star above the "CRF" monogram crest on their shirts.

Club's crest (2018–present)

Club's crest (1980–2018)

Rowing crest (2018–present)

Rowing crest (1985–2018)

=== Uniforms ===
At the 1895 meeting which established the Flamengo rowing club, the club's official colors were decided as blue and gold to symbolized the sky of Rio de Janeiro and the riches of Brazil. The team adopted a uniform of thick blue and gold horizontal stripes. However Flamengo failed to win a single regatta in their first year and gained the nickname of "bronze club." The team colors were perceived as bad luck, and the colored fabric was expensive to import from England. One year after the club's establishment, the official colors were replaced with the current red and black.

In 1912, at the request of the Flamengo rowing team (who opposed the use of their uniform by the newly established football team), the football players dressed in shirts divided into red and black quarters which became known as the papagaio de vintém uniform, named after a particular style of kite. However the shirt became synonymous with bad luck and was replaced in 1913 by a shirt with red and black horizontal stripes and thinner white bands. This uniform was nicknamed the cobra coral due to its similarity to the pattern of a coral snake. This was the uniform worn when Flamengo won their first Campeonato Carioca title in 1914. The white bands were removed from the shirt in 1916 as the pattern was very similar to the flag of Germany at the time, which Brazil was allied against in World War I. The rowing team permitted the football team to use their uniform, and Flamengo's traditional football uniform of a red and black striped shirt, white shorts and red-black socks was born.

In 1938, Flamengo manager Dori Kürschner suggested the creation of a secondary white uniform to "improve the visibility in night matches." The new uniform was approved by the club, and Flamengo became a pioneer of secondary uniforms in Brazil. The white shirt had two red and black stripes across the chest until 1979 when it was changed to a plain white chest with stripes on the sleeves. This was the shirt worn by the team that won the 1981 Intercontinental Cup.

Beginning in the 1990s the club began to experiment with their second and third alternative uniforms, sometimes wearing all black or all red shirts. In 1995 for the club's centenary, a "papagaio de vintém" shirt was worn in friendlies. In 2010 uniform supplier Olympikus introduced a blue and gold alternative uniform which paid homage to Flamengo's original colors and regatta uniform; however it was not well received by fans who likened it to the uniform worn by the fictional satirical team "Tabajara" on the popular comedy program Casseta & Planeta Urgente. In the first half of the 2009 season, the team wore a uniform without sponsorship for the first time in 25 years. Flamengo have continued to traditionally wear red and black striped shirts with white shorts as their primary uniform.

On April 1, 2026, Flamengo, through an official statement, announced that it would retire the term "Away" for its traditional white kit. Although initially believed to be an April Fool's Day prank, it was confirmed to be true ten days later through a publicity campaign for the new secondary uniform, with the kit being renamed "Manto 1 Branco".

Traditional primary uniform	1st traditional secondary uniform	2nd traditional secondary uniform	2015 "papagaio de vintém" kit	2010 blue and gold alternative kit

==== Kit suppliers and shirt sponsors ====
The following is a list of Flamengo's sponsors and uniform suppliers.

Period	Kit manufacturer	Main sponsor	Secondary sponsor(s)
1912–60	none	none	none
1961–70	Athleta	none	none
1971	Penalty	none	none
1972–78	Athleta	none	none
1979	Doria	none	none
1980	Penalty	none	none
1981–84	Adidas	none	none
1984–92	Adidas	Petrobras	none
1992–00	Umbro	Petrobras	none
2000–05	Nike	Petrobras	none
2006–08	Nike	Petrobras	Petrobras (sleeves)
2009	Nike	none	none
2009	Olympikus	Olympikus	Bozzano (sleeves)
2009	Olympikus	Ale Combustíveis	Bozzano (sleeves)
2010	Olympikus	Batavo	Banco BMG (sleeves)
2011	Olympikus	Procter & Gamble	List: Banco BMG (sleeves) Brasil Brokers (shoulder) UNICEF (center chest) TIM (numbers)
2012	Olympikus	none	List: Banco BMG (sleeves) Brasil Foodservice Group (shorts) Mobil (lower back and shorts) Triunfo Logística (shoulder) UNICEF (center chest) TIM (numbers)
2013	Adidas	Caixa	List: Peugeot (back) TIM (numbers)
2014	Adidas	Caixa	List: Peugeot (back) TIM (numbers) Guaraviton (sleeves)
2015	Adidas	Caixa	List: Guaraviton (back and sleeves) TIM (numbers) Jeep (lower back)
2016	Adidas	Caixa	List: MRV (back) iFood (sleeves) TIM (numbers) Yes! (lower back)
2017	Adidas	Caixa	List: MRV (back) Carabao (sleeves) Universidade Brasil (shoulder) TIM (numbers) Yes! (lower back) Kodilar (socks)
2018	Adidas	Caixa	List: MRV (back) Carabao (sleeves) Universidade Brasil (shoulder) TIM (numbers) Descomplica (lower back) Kodilar (socks)
2019	Adidas	Banco BS2	List: MRV (back) Buser (sleeves) Universidade Brasil (shoulder) TIM (numbers) Multimarcas Consórcios (lower back) Kodilar (training uniform)
2020	Adidas	Banco BS2	List: MRV (back) Sportsbet.io (shoulder) TIM (numbers) Total (lower back) Azeite Royal (shorts) Orthopride (socks) Kodilar (training uniform)
2020	Adidas	Banco BRB	List: MRV (back) Sportsbet.io (shoulder) TIM (numbers) Total (lower back) Union Life (shorts) Orthopride (socks) Kodilar (training uniform)
2020	Adidas	Banco BRB	List
2021	Adidas	Banco BRB	List: Mercado Livre (back) Sportsbet.io (shoulder) Havan (sleeves) TIM (numbers) TotalEnergies (lower back) ABC da Construção (shorts) MOSS (socks) Kodilar (training uniform) Socios.com (training uniform)
2022	Adidas	Banco BRB	List: Mercado Livre (back) PixBet (shoulder) Havan (sleeves) TIM (numbers) Assist Card (lower back) ABC da Construção (shorts) Luvix (socks) Socios.com (training uniform) Kodilar (training uniform) eFootball (training uniform) MoonPay (training uniform)
2023	Adidas	Banco BRB	List: Mercado Livre (back) PixBet (shoulder) Sil (sleeves) TIM (numbers) Assist Card (lower back) ABC da Construção (shorts) Socios.com (training uniform) Kodilar (training uniform) eFootball (training uniform) MoonPay (training uniform) Texaco (training and warm up uniforms)
2024	Adidas	PixBet	List: Mercado Livre (back) Banco BRB (shoulder) Kwai (sleeves) Assist Card (lower back) ABC da Construção (shorts) Socios.com (training uniform) Kodilar (training uniform) eFootball (training uniform) MoonPay (training uniform) Texaco (training and warm up uniforms)
2025	Adidas	PixBet	List: FlaBet (back) Banco BRB (shoulder) Shopee (sleeves) Assist Card (lower back) ABC da Construção (shorts) Zé Delivery (socks) Texaco (numbers)
2025	Adidas	Betano	List: Hapvida (back) Banco BRB (shoulder) Shopee (sleeves) Assist Card (lower back) ABC da Construção (shorts) Zé Delivery (socks) Texaco (numbers)
2026	Adidas	Betano	List: Hapvida (back) Banco BRB (shoulder) Shopee (sleeves) Ademicon (lower front) Assist Card (lower back) GAC Group (shorts) WAP (shorts) Zé Delivery (socks) Texaco (numbers)

==== Uniform deals ====
Uniform supplier	Period	Contract announcement	Contract duration	Value	Notes
Adidas	1980–1992	1980	13 years	Undisclosed	
Umbro	1993–1999	1992	7 years	Undisclosed	
Nike	2000–2008	6 July 2000	6 July 2000 – 30 June 2009 (9 years)	Undisclosed	
Olympikus	2009–2013	27 May 2008	1 July 2009 – 30 March 2013 (5 years)	Total R$170 million	
Adidas	2013–2022	20 December 2012	1 May 2013 – 30 April 2023 (10 years)	Total US$175.24 million	
Adidas	2022–2024	18 January 2022	18 January 2022 – 30 April 2025 (4 years)	Total R$276 million	
Adidas	2024–present	29 April 2024	29 April 2024 – 31 December 2029 (5 years)	Total R$350 million	

=== Scarlet-Black Nation ===
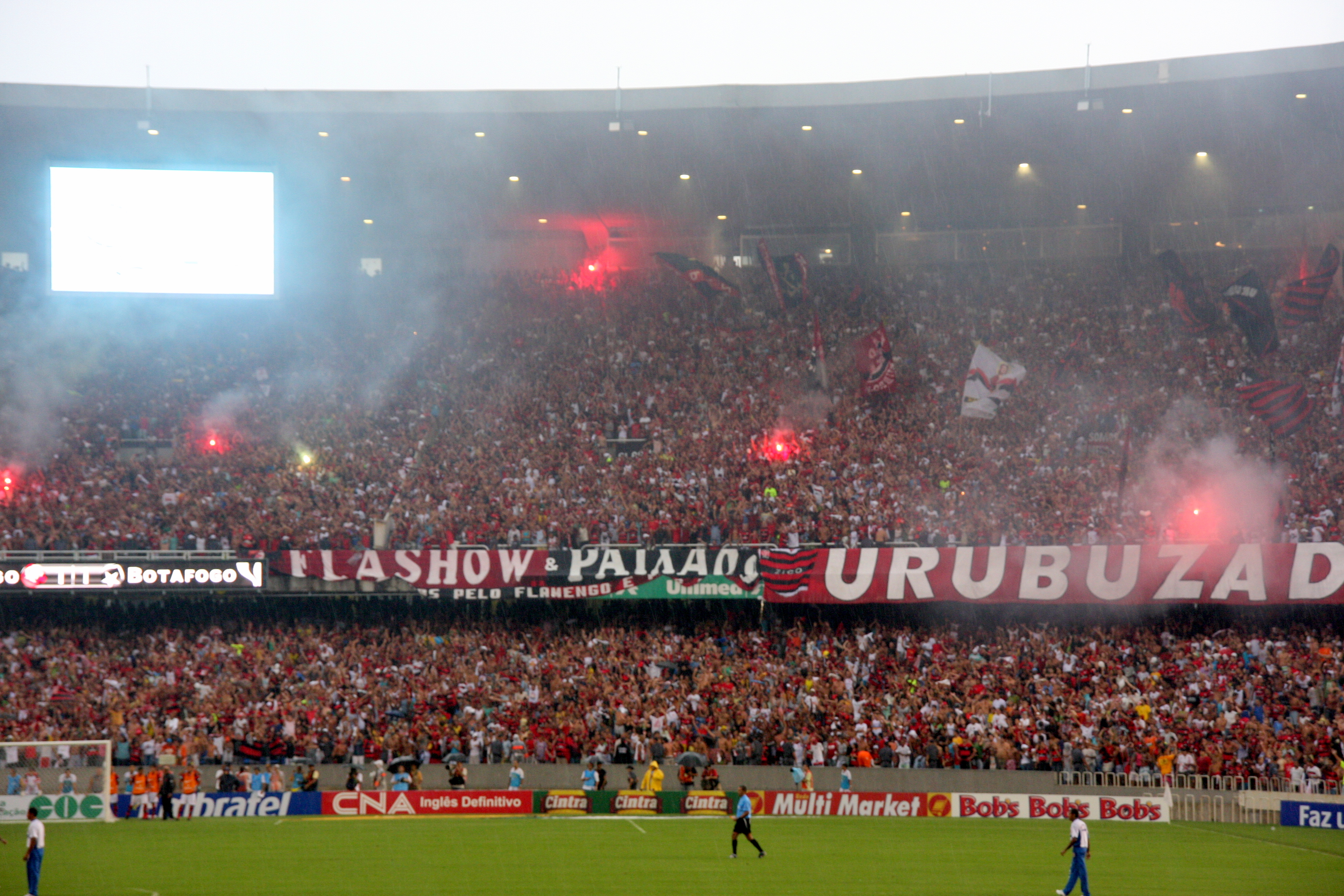
Flamengo supporters at Maracanã stadium.

Since the early 1990s, surveys have shown that Flamengo is consistently the most supported club in Brazil with an estimated more than 40 million fans. In a 2019 survey, 20 percent of adult football fans in Brazil consider themselves supporters of Flamengo, with high levels of support in all states of the country, including the North and Northeast regions, in addition to Rio de Janeiro. Flamengo supporters are known as Nação Rubro-Negra (English: Scarlet-Black Nation).

The first organized supporters group in all of Brazil, Charanga Rubro-Negra (Scarlet-Black Charanga Band), was founded in support of Flamengo in 1942. Since then, a large number of additional organized supporters groups have formed around Flamengo, notably Torcida Jovem-Fla (Young-Fla), Urubuzada (Vultures), Flamanguaça (FlaBooze), and Raça Rubro-Negra (Scarlet-Black Race).

In 2007 Flamengo supporters were declared as part of the cultural heritage of the city of Rio de Janeiro, along with bossa nova and Bola Preta, the oldest Carnival block in Rio.

In the 1983 Campeonato Brasileiro Série A final, Flamengo played against Santos in the Maracanã in front of an official crowd of 155,523 with some estimates of over 160,000 people in attendance.

The largest attendance for a football match in history was the derby between Flamengo and Fluminense in 1963, with 194,603 spectators. Flamengo matches in the Maracanã have broken the 150,000 attendance mark thirteen times.

In July 2020, Flamengo's YouTube channel FLATV passed Liverpool F.C. as the club with the third-most subscriptions for a football channel only behind Barcelona and Real Madrid. The channel has reached over 5 million subscribers.

=== Mascot ===
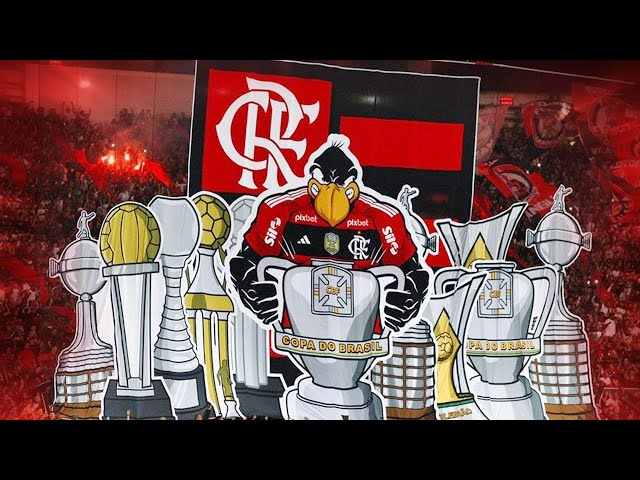
Mosaic of Flamengo fans showing the vulture mascot with the most important cups won by the club

Flamengo's first mascot was Popeye the Sailor Man, a comic book and cartoon character from the 1940s. The idea for the mascot came from Argentine cartoonist Lorenzo Molas, who saw in Popeye the strength and persistence of Flamengo, in addition to its obvious connection with the sea. However, such a mascot was never very popular among the club's supporters.

In the 1960s, rival fans began to call Flamengo fans urubus (English: "vultures"), a racist allusion to the large number of supporters who were poor or of African descent. Such an offensive nickname was never well received by Flamengo fans, until 31 May 1969. On that day, a Scarlet-Black fan decided to take a vulture to a game between Flamengo and Botafogo at Maracanã. The two clubs were involved in the greatest rivalry since Garrincha, and Flamengo had not beaten its rival for four years. In the stands, Botafogo fans shouted that Flamengo was a urubu team. The vulture was released in the stands with Flamengo's flag tied to its feet, and when it landed on the field, just before the game started, the crowd cheered and shouted: "É urubu, é urubu." (English: "it's a vulture, it's a vulture"). Flamengo won the game 2–1 and, from there, the new mascot was consecrated, taking Popeye's place. The cartoonist Henfil tried to humanize it in his sports cartoons in newspapers and magazines, and the urubu became a popular mascot.

In 2000, Flamengo's mascot received an official design and a name: Samuca. However, this name did not become popular among the supporters, who continue to call him simply Urubu.

On 25 May 2008, debuted at Maracanã in a match between Flamengo and Internacional, valid for the 2008 Campeonato Brasileiro Série A. Since then, they have been present in several Flamengo games and events.

=== Anthem ===
Flamengo has two anthems: the official one, called Hymno Rubro-Negro (English: "Scarlet-Black Anthem"), which was created in 1920 with lyrics and music by Paulo Magalhães (former goalkeeper of the club), recorded in 1932 by singer Castro Barbosa and registered in 1937 at the Instituto Nacional de Música, with the refrain "Flamengo! Flamengo! Tua glória é lutar, Flamengo! Flamengo! Campeão de terra e mar" (in English: "Flamengo! Flamengo! Your glory is to fight, Flamengo! Flamengo! Champion of land and sea"); and the popular one, with lyrics and music by Lamartine Babo, recorded for the first time by Gilberto Alves in 1945. The latter is the best known, and its refrain is "Uma vez Flamengo, sempre Flamengo" (English: "Once you are Flamengo, always Flamengo").

== Stadiums ==
=== Rua Paysandu ===
Flamengo's first official home ground was the Estádio da Rua Paysandu ('Paysandu Street Stadium'). The ground formerly belonged to Paissandu Atlético Clube before they ceased playing football in 1914. The owners of the ground, the Guinle family, rented the field to Flamengo where they played their home matches from 1915 to 1932. Between 1912 and 1915 (and later between 1932 and 1938), the club played all their matches on the grounds of Botafogo or Fluminense. The first Flamengo match at Rua Paysandu was played on 31 October 1915, in the Campeonato Carioca against Bangu. 15,000 spectators watched Flamengo face Fluminense at the park in 1918 and 1919.

=== Estádio da Gávea ===
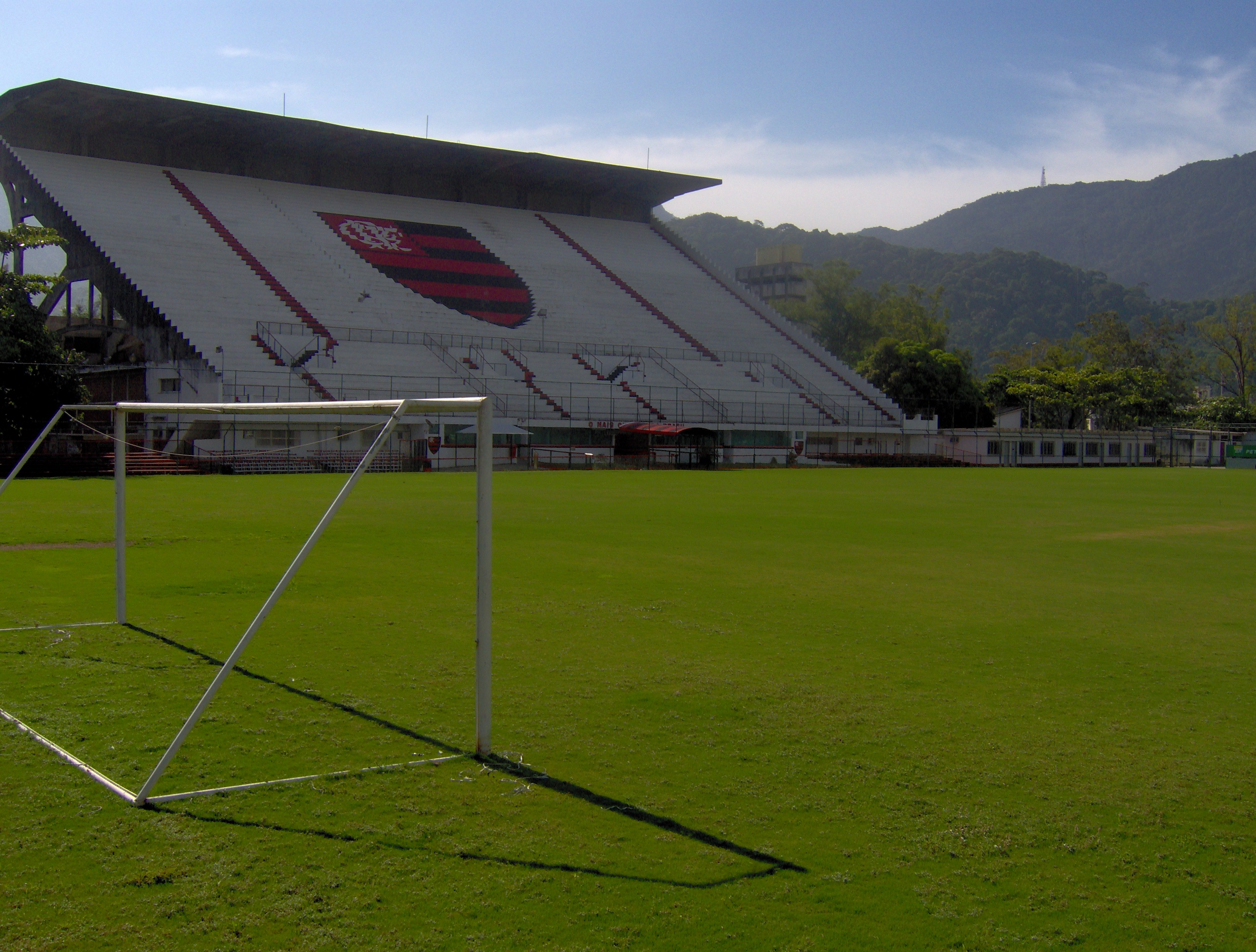
Estádio da Gávea

Flamengo's home stadium is nominally the Estádio da Gávea (officially named the Estádio José Bastos Padilha at Flamengo's Gávea Headquarters), which was inaugurated on 4 September 1938, and has a capacity of 4,000 people. The stadium is named after José Bastos Padilha, Flamengo's president at the time of the stadium's construction, from 1933 to 1937. Even though Flamengo no longer play their matches at Gávea, the site serves as the club's administrative headquarters. Since the 1990s, the stadium has been used almost exclusively for the club's youth and women's teams' matches, and as the training ground for the senior team. Most matches are played at the significantly larger Maracanã Stadium, considered by supporters to be the real Flamengo home ground. Gávea Stadium is not actually located in the neighborhood of Gávea but rather in Leblon.

During the 2014 FIFA World Cup, the Dutch National Team used the Estádio da Gávea and its facilities as their training ground in preparation for the competition.

=== Maracanã ===
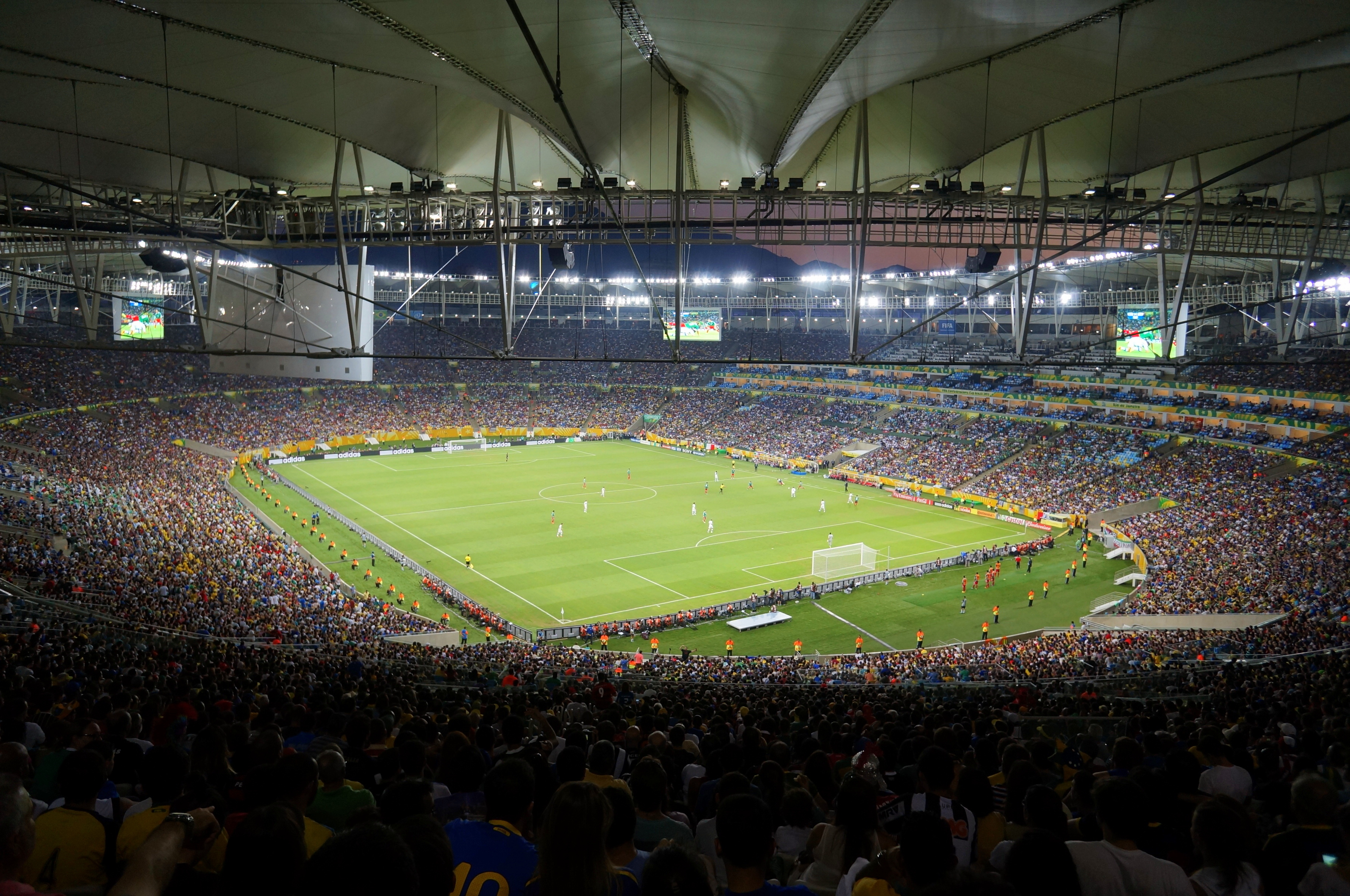
Inside view of Maracanã

Since its construction for the 1950 World Cup, the Maracanã has primarily served as the home ground for the four biggest Rio de Janeiro clubs. The stadium was officially completed in 1965, 17 years after construction began. In 1963, more than 194,000 people attended a match between Flamengo and Fluminense at the Maracanã. The capacity of the stadium allowed Flamengo to have the largest support of any clubs in Brazil for much of the 20th century. In 1989 Zico scored his final goal in the historic stadium, setting the current unbroken record for goals in the Maracanã at 333. An upper stand in the stadium collapsed on 19 July 1992, in the second match of the finals of 1992 Campeonato Brasileiro Série A between Botafogo and Flamengo, leading to the death of three spectators and injuring 50 others. Following the disaster, the stadium's capacity was greatly reduced as it was converted to an all-seater stadium in the late 1990s. Following its 50th anniversary in 2000, the stadium underwent renovations which would increase its full capacity to around 103,000. After years of planning and nine months of closure between 2005 and 2006 (during which Flamengo played their home matches at Volta Redonda's Estádio Raulino de Oliveira and Portuguesa's Estádio Luso Brasileiro), the stadium was reopened in January 2007 with an all-seated capacity of 87,000. For the 2014 World Cup and 2016 Olympics and Paralympics, a major reconstruction project was initiated in 2010. The original seating bowl, with a two-tier configuration, was demolished, giving way to a new one-tier seating bowl.

The stadium is officially under the management of Brazilian conglomerate Odebrecht as of 2013. This has resulted in unfavorable rental agreements for Flamengo who do not officially administer the stadium and often owe rental fees for matches in excess of their ticket revenue, even for matches with high attendance. The most recent rental agreement was signed in 2018 and is valid through 2020. In April 2019, Flamengo and Fluminense came to an agreement with the state and the operators of the Maracanã to serve as joint-managers of the venue for the following six months, a deal which allowed the clubs to pay a fixed monthly fee and receive a higher share of matchday revenue than was granted under the previous deal.

=== Ilha do Urubu ===
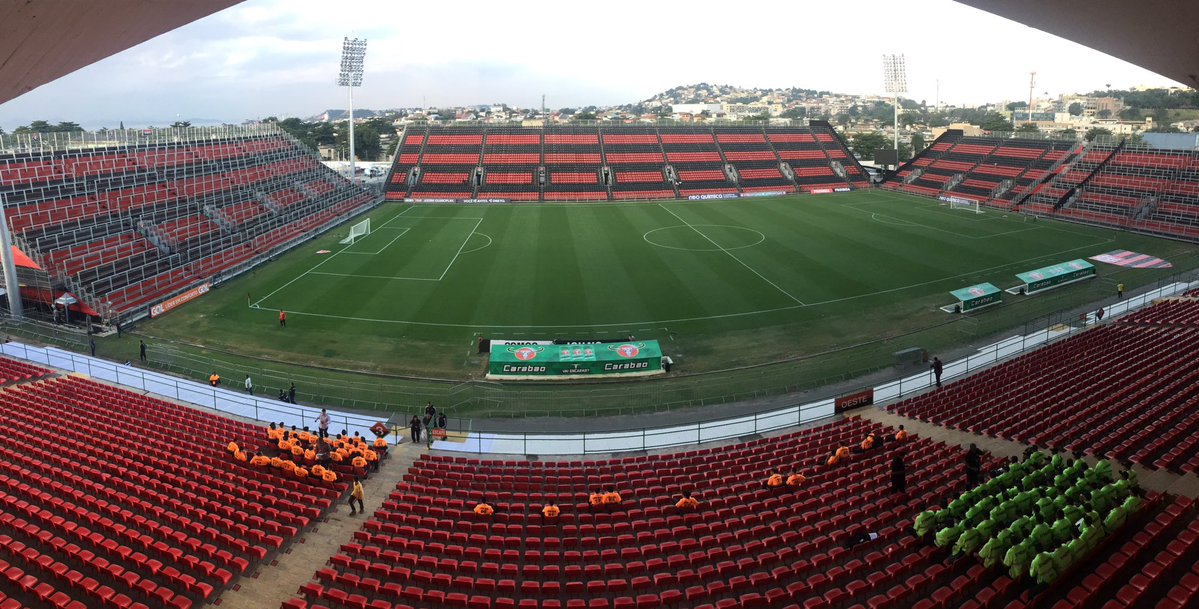
Ilha do Urubu

In 2017, Flamengo played their home matches at the Estádio Luso Brasileiro of Portuguesa while disputing their stadium situation with the Rio de Janeiro state government and Complexo Maracanã Entretenimento S.A. (composed of Odebrecht, IMX, AEG), the operator of the Maracanã Stadium. A three-year agreement was signed with Portuguesa over management of Estádio Luso Brasileiro, named Ilha do Urubu ("Vulture's Island") by Flamengo supporters in a poll. The park was renovated to fit 20,500 spectators. Flamengo started playing at the arena in March 2017, but after several delays and administrative issues and a new contract with the Maracanã, Flamengo broke their lease with the Ilha do Urubu in July 2018.

=== New Flamengo Stadium ===
In December 2024, it was reported that Flamengo had released the design of their new stadium, an 80,000 capacity state-of-the-art stadium to be constructed in the Gasômetro area. The stadium is estimated to cost approximately €500 million and once completed will become the largest stadium in Brazil. Scheduled for completion by November 2029 or earlier, the sports arena includes a North Stand dedicated for its most passionate supporters, luxury seating, a 360-degree internal LED screen, a massive external display and a total of 6,200m^{2} of LED surfaces.

== Rivalries ==
=== Rivalry with Botafogo ===
The Clássico da Rivaldade ('Rivalry Classic') is the traditional Brazilian derby between Botafogo and Flamengo, both from Rio de Janeiro. The first confrontation between Rio de Janeiro rivals Flamengo and Botafogo occurred in 1913. Flamengo's mascot of the vulture originated during the 1 June 1969, match against Botafogo when Flamengo supporters released a vulture onto the field in response to the racist cheers of urubu (vulture) from Botafogo and other teams' supporters. Flamengo's top scorer in the derby is Zico and Botafogo's top scorer is Heleno de Freitas.

=== Rivalry with Fluminense ===
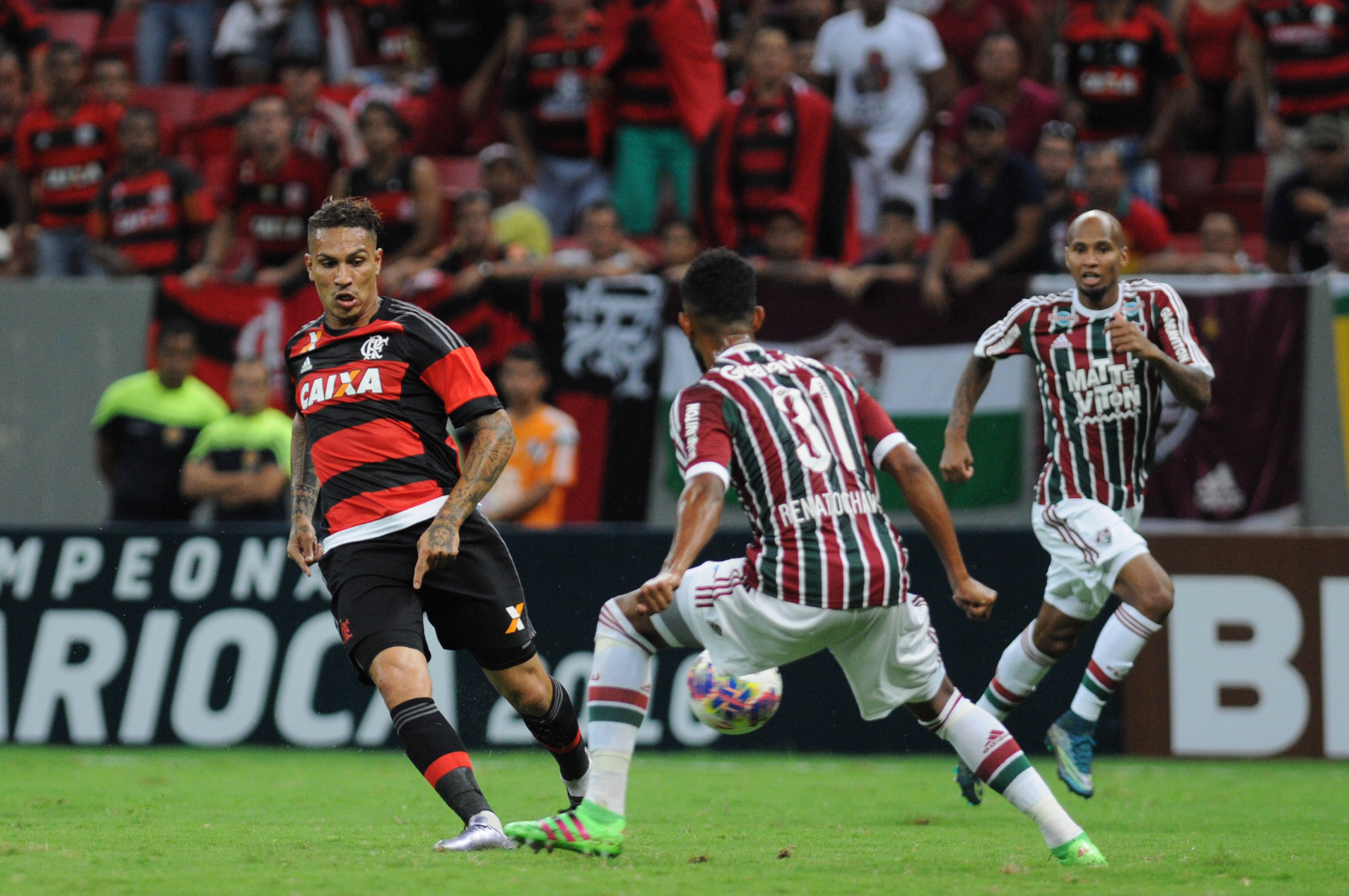
Paolo Guerrero in a 2016 Campeonato Carioca game between Flamengo and Fluminense

The Fla–Flu is the traditional Brazilian derby between Flamengo and Fluminense, both from Rio de Janeiro. It is considered by football experts and much of the sports media to be one of the greatest derbies in the world. The rivalry between the two clubs began in October 1911, when a group of dissatisfied players from Fluminense left their club and joined rowing club of Flamengo, establishing the football department at their new club. The first Fla–Flu ever was played the following year on 7 July. Fluminense won the match 3–2, with 800 people in attendance. According to writer Nelson Rodrigues, the classic was generated by resentment. On the tricolor side, the fact that their starting players deserted and went to form Flamengo's football department, and on the red-black side, the fact that Fluminense still won the first match, circumstances that were fundamental in generating the derby mystique.

In 1950, the Maracanã Stadium was built to host the FIFA World Cup, and it has been the stage for clashes between the two ever since. The stadium, which belongs to the Rio de Janeiro State Government, began to be managed by the two clubs in April 2019 for six months. In September 2024, both clubs reached an agreement to jointly manage the stadium for another 20 years. The Fla–Flu holds the world record for attendance in games between clubs: 194,603 spectators were present at the Maracanã Stadium, in the final of the 1963 Campeonato Carioca, won by Flamengo after a goalless draw.

Flamengo and Fluminense are the two most successful teams in the Campeonato Carioca: as of 2025, Flamengo have 39 state league titles and Fluminense have 34. Since 2012, Fla–Flu has been considered an Intangible Heritage of Rio de Janeiro, being the only football derby to receive this honor.

=== Rivalry with Vasco da Gama ===
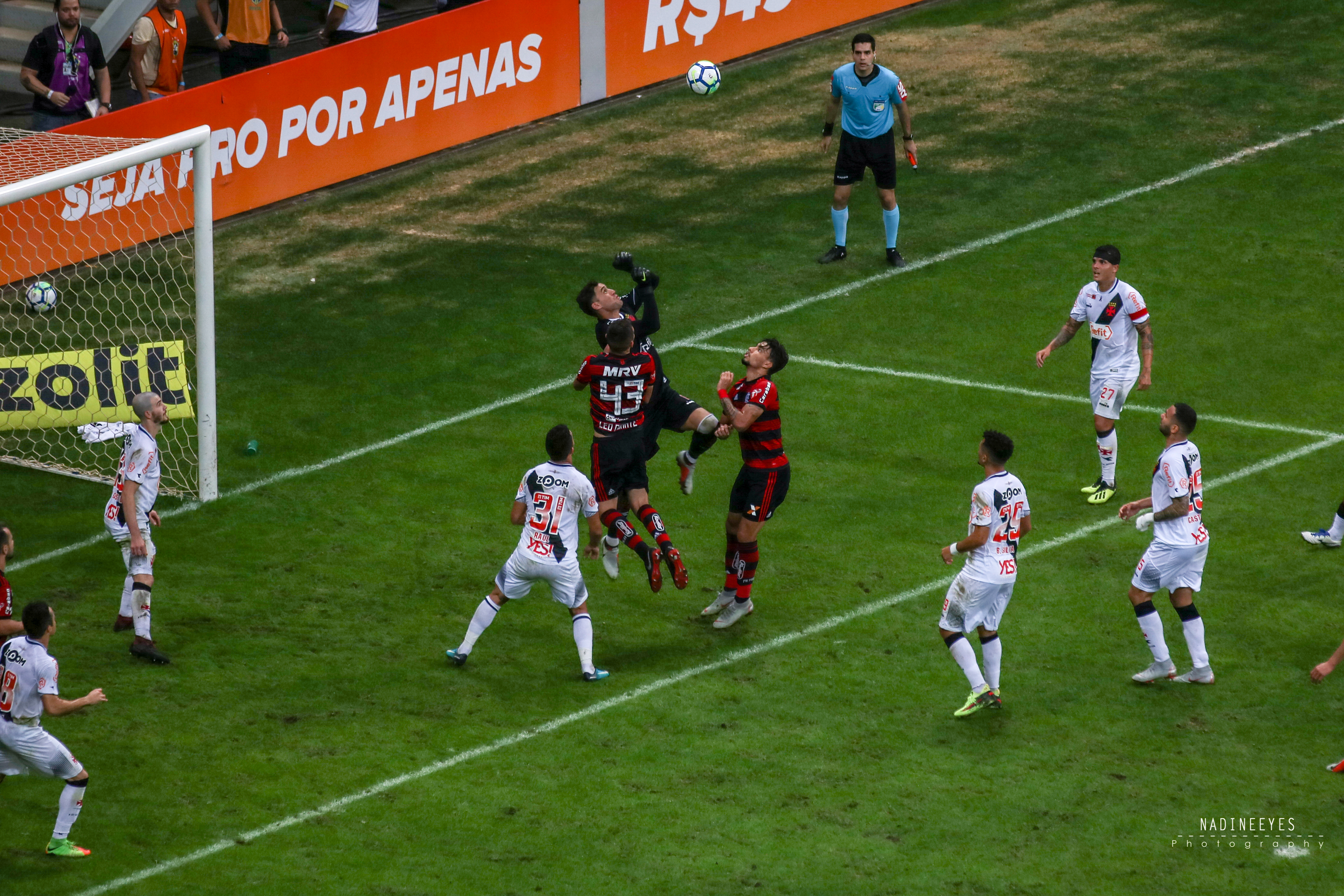
Game between Flamengo and Vasco da Gama in 2018

The Clássico dos Milhões ('Derby of Millions') is the traditional Brazilian derby between Flamengo and Vasco da Gama, both from Rio de Janeiro. Although the rivalries against Botafogo and Fluminense are more traditional, Vasco is the club most hated by Flamengo supporters and vice versa, with the derby between them being considered one of the biggest rivalries in Brazilian football and in football worldwide. The derby's name originated in the 1920s and refers to the two largest fanbases in the state of Rio de Janeiro. Both clubs were established in the late 19th century as regatta rowing clubs. The first football match between the clubs was played in 1923 when Vasco entered the top division of the Campeonato Carioca.

From 1972 to 2001, the matchup was elevated as the most important of Flamengo's rivalries and became one of the biggest rivalries in all of Brazil. In this span, Flamengo and Vasco played in or won the final of each of the phases of the state championship nearly every year, frequently facing one another. This also coincided with the beginnings of the national Campeonato Brasileiro and the growth in popularity of both clubs nationwide. The most iconic matches between Flamengo and Vasco featured the idols of both clubs challenging each other: Zico of Flamengo (1971–83; 85–89) and Roberto Dinamite of Vasco da Gama (1971–79; 80–93).

Some of the great players in Brazilian football played for both teams, and with hectic transfers in the 1980s and 1990s. Bebeto, originally of Flamengo, was seen as Zico's successor, but left the red-black team and went to play for Vasco in 1989. Romário played on Vasco's youth teams, but when he returned to Brazil in 1995, recently champion of the 1994 FIFA World Cup and elected best player of the year by FIFA, he chose to play for Flamengo. Other players like Andrade, Edmundo, Felipe, Jean, Jorginho, Juninho Paulista, Dejan Petković and Tita have played for these teams.

=== Interstate rivalries ===
==== Rivalry with Atlético Mineiro ====
Flamengo has an inter-state rivalry with Atlético Mineiro of Minas Gerais, developed in the 1980s from numerous controversial encounters between the two clubs in that decade's Campeonato Brasileiro and Copa Libertadores editions. It has maintained its high intensity through the following years, and is considered one of the biggest interstate rivalries in Brazilian football.

==== Rivalry with Palmeiras ====
The rivalry with Palmeiras of São Paulo has become increasingly intense over the course of the 21st century. The two clubs have already decided five official titles between them, including two Copa Libertadores, and they are the two most successful teams in South American football over the past decade. The rivalry extends beyond the pitch, with numerous clashes and exchanges of barbs between club officials. A considerable part of the Brazilian sports press claims that Flamengo and Palmeiras are the main protagonists of a “Spanish-style” dominance of Brazilian football, in which two clubs share the major titles and polarize public attention.

== Players ==
=== First-team squad ===
As of 19 September 2026

Note: Flags indicate national team as defined under FIFA eligibility rules; some limited exceptions apply. Players may hold more than one non-FIFA nationality.

No.	Pos.	Nation	Player
1	GK	ARG	Agustín Rossi
2	DF	URU	Guillermo Varela
3	DF	BRA	Léo Ortiz
4	DF	BRA	Léo Pereira (3rd vice-captain)
5	MF	CHI	Erick Pulgar
6	DF	BRA	Ayrton Lucas
7	FW	BRA	Luiz Araújo
8	MF	ESP	Saúl Ñíguez
9	FW	BRA	Pedro
10	MF	URU	Giorgian de Arrascaeta (vice-captain)
11	MF	BRA	Lucas Paquetá
13	DF	BRA	Danilo
14	FW	ECU	Anthony Valencia
15	MF	COL	Jorge Carrascal

No.	Pos.	Nation	Player
16	FW	BRA	Samuel Lino
18	MF	URU	Nicolás de la Cruz
19	FW	ECU	Gonzalo Plata
21	MF	ITA	Jorginho
22	DF	BRA	Emerson Royal
26	DF	BRA	Alex Sandro (2nd vice-captain)
27	FW	BRA	Bruno Henrique (captain)
30	FW	ARG	Joaquín Freitas
42	GK	BRA	Andrew
44	DF	BRA	Vitão
49	GK	BRA	Dyogo Alves
52	MF	BRA	Evertton Araújo
61	DF	BRA	João Victor

For recent transfers, see List of Brazilian football transfers 2026 and 2026 CR Flamengo season#Transfers and loans

=== Youth players with first team numbers ===
The following players have previously made appearances or have appeared on the substitutes bench for the first team.

Note: Flags indicate national team as defined under FIFA eligibility rules; some limited exceptions apply. Players may hold more than one non-FIFA nationality.

No.	Pos.	Nation	Player
39	FW	BRA	Josmar
50	MF	ARG	Juan Sayago (on loan from River Plate)
51	DF	BRA	Daniel Sales
54	DF	BRA	João Vitor
56	MF	BRA	Pablo Lúcio
57	DF	ESP	Ernest Muñoz (on loan from Portuguesa)
58	GK	BRA	Léo Nannetti
60	DF	BRA	Germano
63	FW	BRA	David Viana
66	DF	BRA	Gustavo Ramires

No.	Pos.	Nation	Player
67	MF	BRA	Kaio Júnior
71	GK	BRA	Pedro Batista
75	MF	BRA	Luiz Felipe
76	DF	BRA	Gabriel Amancio
77	DF	BRA	Johnny Góes
79	MF	BRA	Joshua
81	FW	BRA	Douglas Telles
82	MF	BRA	Jheferson
84	GK	BRA	Gabriel Werneck
87	DF	BRA	Daniel Thuram

=== Out on loan ===
Note: Flags indicate national team as defined under FIFA eligibility rules; some limited exceptions apply. Players may hold more than one non-FIFA nationality.

No.	Pos.	Nation	Player
17	DF	URU	Matías Viña (on loan to Cruzeiro until 31 December 2026)
29	MF	BRA	Allan (on loan to Corinthians until 31 December 2026)
74	DF	BRA	Gusttavo (on loan to Estoril Praia until 30 June 2027)

No.	Pos.	Nation	Player
—	MF	BRA	Pedro Henrique (on loan to Paysandu until 30 November 2026)
—	FW	BRA	Carlinhos (on loan to Athletic-MG until 30 November 2026)

=== Retired numbers ===
- 12 – (Brazil) Club Supporters (the 12th Man) – Number dedicated to the rubro-negro fans.

== Management team ==
As of 13 May 2025.

Position	Name
Coaching staff
Head coach	(Portugal) Leonardo Jardim
Assistant head coach	(Brazil) Márcio de Moraes Torres
Goalkeepers trainer	(Brazil) Rogério Maia
Goalkeepers trainer	(Brazil) Thiago Eller
Performance analyst	(Brazil) Wellington Sales
Performance analyst	(Brazil) Eduardo Coimbra
Performance analyst	(Brazil) Arthur Souza
Performance analyst	(Brazil) Victor Saad
Head of scouting	(Ukraine) Andrii Fedchenkov
Medical staff
Health and high performance manager	(Brazil) Fernando Sassaki
Fitness coach	(Brazil) Diogo Linhares
Fitness coach	(Brazil) Arthur Peixoto
Fitness coach	(Brazil) Júnior Bezerra
Doctor	(Brazil) Marcelo Soares
Doctor	(Brazil) Fernando Bassan
Physiotherapist	(Brazil) Laniyan Neves

== Honours ==
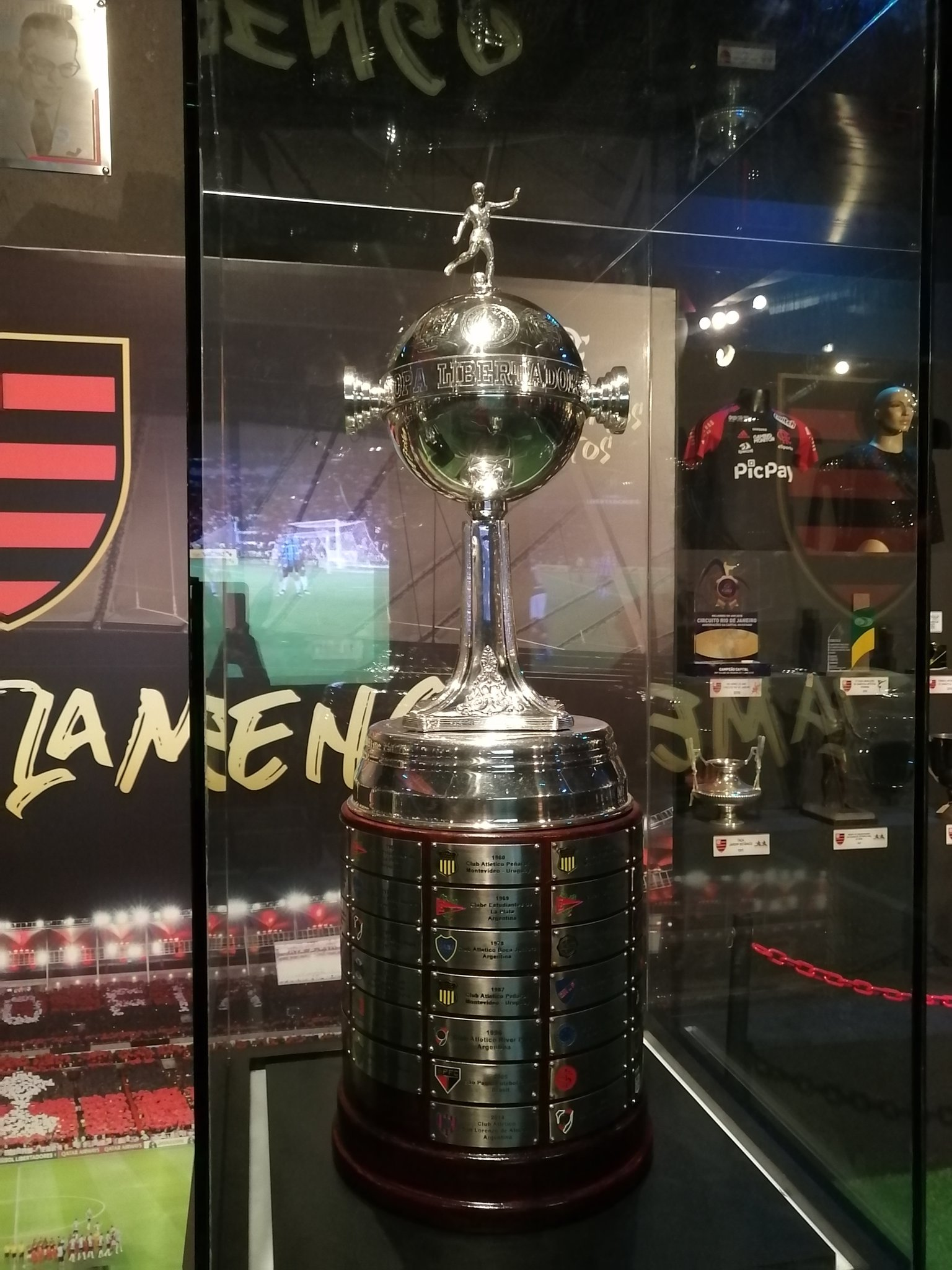
Flamengo's trophy room at the club's museum.

=== Official tournaments ===
Worldwide
Competitions	Titles	Seasons
Intercontinental Cup	1	1981
FIFA Challenger Cup	1^{s}	2025
FIFA Derby of the Americas	1^{s}	2025
Continental
Competitions	Titles	Seasons
Copa Libertadores	4	1981, 2019, 2022, 2025
Copa Mercosur	1^{s}	1999
Recopa Sudamericana	1	2020
Copa de Oro	1^{s}	1996
National
Competitions	Titles	Seasons
Campeonato Brasileiro Série A	10	1980, 1982, 1983, 1987, 1992, 2009, 2019, 2020, 2025, 2026
Copa do Brasil	5	1990, 2006, 2013, 2022, 2024
Supercopa do Brasil	3	2020, 2021, 2025
Copa dos Campeões	1^{s}	2001
Inter-state
Competitions	Titles	Seasons
Torneio Rio–São Paulo	1	1961^{(2)}
State
Competitions	Titles	Seasons
Campeonato Carioca	40	1914, 1915, 1920, 1921, 1925, 1927, 1939, 1942, 1943, 1944, 1953, 1954, 1955, 1963, 1965, 1972, 1974, 1978, 1979 (Special), 1979, 1981, 1986, 1991, 1996, 1999, 2000, 2001, 2004, 2007, 2008, 2009, 2011, 2014, 2017, 2019, 2020, 2021, 2024, 2025, 2026
Copa Rio	1	1991

- record
- ^{s} shared record

^{(1)} This championship was organized by the "Club of Thirteen," independently of the Brazilian Football Confederation (CBF), which organized a tournament for 16 of the clubs that were left out (including Guarani de Campinas, runner-up in 1986), called the Yellow Module, and which insisted on semifinals between the top two finishers of the Copa União (Flamengo and Internacional-RS) and those of the Yellow Module (Sport Recife and Guarani). Flamengo and Internacional did not participate, and the CBF registered Sport Recife and Guarani for the Copa Libertadores. From 2019 onwards, the CBF began to include the tournament among the Brazilian titles on its official website, but with different names: "Brasileiro" and "Copa União."

^{(2)} In 1940 the competition was interrupted with Flamengo and Fluminense in the lead, without the CBD making the title official, however, the clubs and newspapers at the time considered the result definitive and declared the Flamengo and Fluminense as the legitimate champions of the competition. The club currently considers itself champion of the competition and includes this title among its achievements.

=== Other tournaments ===
==== International ====
- Lima International Tournament (1): 1952
- Juan Domingo Peron Tournament (1): 1953
- Torneio Internacional do Rio de Janeiro (4): 1954, 1955, 1970, 1972
- Israel International Tournament (1): 1958
- Torneo Hexagonal de Lima (1): 1959
- South American Octagonal Tournament (1): 1961
- Tunisia International Tournament (1): 1962
- Colombia International Tournament (1): 1964
- Orange Trophy (2): 1964, 1986
- Mohammed V Cup (1): 1968
- Torneio Quadrangular Internacional de Goiás (1): 1975
- Trofeo Ciudad de Palma de Mallorca (1): 1978
- Ramón de Carranza Trophy (2): 1979, 1980
- Trofeo Ciudad de Santander (1): 1980
- Naples International Tournament (1): 1981
- Punta del Este Cup (1): 1981
- Air Gabon Tournament (1): 1987
- Angola International Tournament (1): 1987
- Kirin Cup (1): 1988
- Trofeo Colombino (1): 1988
- Hamburg Port Cup (1): 1989
- Marlboro Cup (1): 1990
- Freedom Cup (1): 1993
- SEE'94 Tournament (1): 1994
- Florida Cup (1): 2019
- Algarve Trophy (1): 2026

==== National and Inter-state ====
- Torneio Triangular de Curitiba (1): 1953
- Taça dos Campeões Estaduais Rio–São Paulo (1): 1955
- Torneio Quadrangular de Vitória (1): 1965
- Torneio Gilberto Alves (1): 1965
- Torneio do Povo (1): 1972
- Torneio da Uva (1): 1975
- Torneio Elmo Serejo (1): 1976
- Torneio Quadrangular de Varginha (1): 1990
- Taça Brahma dos Campeões (1): 1992
- Copa Rede Bandeirantes (1): 1997
- Copa dos Campeões Mundiais (1): 1997
- Super Series Manaus (1): 2015
- Troféu Osmar Santos (2): 2019, 2025
- Troféu João Saldanha (3): 2019, 2020, 2025

==== State ====
- Taça Guanabara (25): 1970, 1972, 1973, 1978, 1979, 1980, 1981, 1982, 1984, 1988, 1989, 1995, 1996, 1999, 2001, 2004, 2007, 2008, 2011, 2014, 2018, 2020, 2021, 2024, 2025
- Taça Rio (9): 1983, 1985, 1986, 1991, 1996, 2000, 2009, 2011, 2019
- Other Campeonato Carioca rounds (7): 1974, 1978, 1979, 1979, 1979, 1981, 1987
- Torneio Extra (1): 1934
- Torneio Aberto (1): 1936
- Torneio Relâmpago (1): 1943
- Campeonato da Capital do Rio de Janeiro Copa Rio stage (2): 1991, 1993
- Torneio Super Clássicos (3): 2013, 2014, 2015
- Torneio Início (6): 1920, 1922, 1946, 1951, 1952, 1959

=== Runners-up ===
- FIFA Intercontinental Cup (1): 2025
- FIFA Club World Cup (1): 2019
- Copa Libertadores (1): 2021
- Copa Sudamericana (1): 2017
- Recopa Sudamericana (2): 2023, 2026
- Supercopa Libertadores (2): 1993, 1995
- Copa Mercosur (1): 2001
- Campeonato Brasileiro Série A (3): 1964, 2018, 2021
- Copa do Brasil (5): 1997, 2003, 2004, 2017, 2023
- Supercopa do Brasil (4): 1991, 2022, 2023, 2026
- Torneio Rio–São Paulo (3): 1957, 1958, 1997
- Campeonato Carioca (35): 1912, 1913, 1919, 1922, 1923, 1924, 1932, 1936, 1937, 1938, 1940, 1941, 1952, 1958, 1961, 1962, 1966, 1968, 1969, 1973, 1977, 1982, 1983, 1984, 1987, 1988, 1989, 1992, 1994, 1995, 1998, 2010, 2013, 2022, 2023
- Copa Rio (1): 1993

=== Youth team ===
- U20 Intercontinental Cup (2): 2024, 2025
- U-20 Copa Libertadores (2): 2024, 2025
- Campeonato Brasileiro Sub-20 (2): 2019, 2023
- Supercopa do Brasil Sub-20 (1): 2019
- Campeonato Brasileiro Sub-17 (2): 2019, 2021
- Copa do Brasil Sub-17 (2): 2018, 2021
- Supercopa do Brasil Sub-17 (1): 2021
- Copa São Paulo de Futebol Júnior (4): 1990, 2011, 2016, 2018
- Taça Belo Horizonte de Juniores (3): 1986, 2003, 2007
- Copa Macaé de Juvenis (2): 1999, 2006
- Copa Votorantim Sub-15 (2): 2015, 2017

=== Awards ===
- IFFHS The World's Club Team of the Year: 2022

== Records ==
=== CONMEBOL club coefficient ranking ===
As of 15 December 2025

Rank	Team	Points
1	(Brazil) Palmeiras	9828,6
2	(Brazil) Flamengo	9303,1
3	(Argentina) River Plate	8762,8
4	(Argentina) Boca Juniors	7360
5	(Uruguay) Peñarol	6029,4

=== Average attendance ===
Below is Flamengo's average home match average attendance in Campeonato Brasileiro league matches since the current league format was adopted in 2003.

Season	Division	Matches	Total attendance	Avg. attendance	Main home stadium
2003	Série A	23	253,460	11,020	Maracanã
2004	Série A	23	239,361	10,407	Raulino de Oliveira
2005	Série A	21	286,797	13,657	Arena Petrobras
2006	Série A	19	298,509	15,711	Maracanã
2007	Série A	19	798,285	42,015	Maracanã
2008	Série A	19	830,984	43,736	Maracanã
2009	Série A	19	761,406	40,074	Maracanã
2010	Série A	19	359,955	18,945	Engenhão
2011	Série A	19	371,374	19,546	Engenhão
2012	Série A	19	265,164	13,956	Engenhão
2013	Série A	19	500,650	26,350	Maracanã
2014	Série A	19	575,126	30,270	Maracanã
2015	Série A	19	598,538	31,502	Maracanã
2016	Série A	19	483,781	25,462	Kléber Andrade
2017	Série A	19	314,812	16,569	Ilha do Urubu
2018	Série A	19	936,759	49,303	Maracanã
2019	Série A	19	1,126,406	59,284	Maracanã
2020	Série A	0 (Note: All matches were played behind closed doors due to the COVID-19 pandemic in Brazil.)	–	–	Maracanã
2021	Série A	9 (Note: Ten home matches were played behind closed doors due to the COVID-19 pandemic in Brazil.)	160,194	17,199	Maracanã
2022	Série A	19	1,037,387	54,599	Maracanã
2023	Série A	19	1.092.515	57,501	Maracanã
2024	Série A	19	1.034.489	54,447	Maracanã
2025	Série A	19	1.188.406	62,548	Maracanã
Total		418	13,354,174	31,948	

=== Domestic results ===
Below are Flamengo's results in domestic competitions since the previous nationwide organized competitions (1959), before the first official Brazilian national championship tournament in 1971.

Domestic results (1959–1970)
Season	Pos	G	W	D	L	GF	GA	Pts	Top league scorer	Goals	CC	CdB
1959	DNQ	–	–	–	–	–	–	–			6th	–
1960	DNQ	–	–	–	–	–	–	–			4th	–
1961	DNQ	–	–	–	–	–	–	–			2nd	–
1962	DNQ	–	–	–	–	–	–	–			2nd	–
1963	DNQ	–	–	–	–	–	–	–			1st	–
1964	2nd	–	–	–	–	–	–	–			3rd	–
1965	DNQ	–	–	–	–	–	–	–			1st	–
1966	DNQ	–	–	–	–	–	–	–			2nd	–
1967	11th	–	–	–	–	–	–	–			6th	–
1967	DNQ	–	–	–	–	–	–	–			6th	–
1968	15th	–	–	–	–	–	–	–			3rd	–
1968	DNQ	–	–	–	–	–	–	–			3rd	–
1969	16th	–	–	–	–	–	–	–			2nd	–
1970	6th	–	–	–	–	–	–	–			5th	–

Domestic results (1971–1980)
Season	Pos	G	W	D	L	GF	GA	Pts	Top league scorer	Goals	CC	CdB
1971	14th	19	4	10	5	13	17	18			4th	–
1972	12th	28	10	10	8	24	25	30			1st	–
1973	24th	28	14	4	13	31	34	26			2nd	–
1974	6th	28	14	6	4	41	15	34			1st	–
1975	7th	28	13	5	10	34	28	38			4th	–
1976	5th	21	14	3	4	48	15	41			5th	–
1977	9th	19	9	6	4	31	11	31			2nd	–
1978	16th	26	13	7	6	33	26	34			1st	–
1979	12th	10	7	2	1	21	6	16			1st	–
1979	12th	10	7	2	1	21	6	16			1st	–
1980	1st	22	14	6	2	46	20	34			3rd	–

Domestic results (1981–1990)
Season	Pos	G	W	D	L	GF	GA	Pts	Top league scorer	Goals	CC	CdB
1981	6th	19	9	7	3	30	19	25	Nunes	16	1st	–
1982	1st	23	15	6	2	48	27	36	Zico	21	2nd	–
1983	1st	26	14	7	5	57	30	35			2nd	–
1984	5th	22	11	7	4	32	20	29			2nd	–
1985	9th	26	11	8	7	40	23	30			3rd	–
1986	13th	28	12	8	8	34	19	32			1st	–
1987	3rd (Note: Sport Recife were declared to be the winners of the 1987 Campeonato Brasileiro by the Brazilian Supreme Court. Flamengo won the Copa União, which is regarded as a national title by the Brazilian Football Confederation.)	19	9	6	4	22	15	24			2nd	–
1988	6th	25	11	8	6	32	20	30			2nd	–
1989	9th	18	6	7	5	16	13	19			2nd	SF
1990	11th	19	7	6	6	24	18	20			4th	W

Domestic results (1991–2000)
Season	Pos	G	W	D	L	GF	GA	Pts	Top league scorer	Goals	CC	CdB
1991	9th	19	7	5	7	20	24	19			1st	DNP
1992	1st	27	12	8	7	44	31	32			2nd	DNP
1993	8th	20	6	8	6	23	24	20			3rd	SF
1994	14th	25	7	9	9	24	27	23			2nd	DNP
1995	21st	23	5	9	9	23	32	24			2nd	SF
1996	13th	23	9	3	11	24	31	30			W	SF
1997	5th	31	14	8	9	37	32	36			5th	RU
1998	11th	23	9	6	8	37	34	33			2nd	R16
1999	12th	21	9	2	10	30	33	29			1st	QF
2000	15th	24	9	6	9	42	37	33			1st	QF

Domestic results (2001–2010)
Season	Pos	G	W	D	L	GF	GA	Pts	Top league scorer	Goals	CC	CdB
2001	24th	27	8	5	14	25	38	29			1st	QF
2002	18th	25	8	6	11	38	39	30			8th	DNP
2003	8th	46	18	12	16	66	73	66	Edílson	13	3rd	RU
2004	17th	46	13	15	18	51	53	54	Dimba	7	1st	RU
2005	15th	42	14	13	15	56	60	55	Renato Abreu	12	8th	3R
2006	11th	38	15	7	16	44	48	52	Obina	11	11th	W
2007	3rd	38	17	10	11	55	49	61	Ibson, Souza, Juan Maldonado	6	1st	DNP
2008	5th	38	18	10	10	67	48	64	Ibson	11	1st	DNP
2009	1st	38	19	10	9	58	44	67	Adriano	19	1st	QF
2010	14th	38	9	17	12	41	44	44	Dejan Petković, Diego Maurício	5	2nd	DNP

Domestic results (2011–2020)
Season	Pos	G	W	D	L	GF	GA	Pts	Top league scorer	Goals	CC	CdB
2011	4th	38	15	16	7	59	47	61	Deivid	15	1st	QF
2012	11th	38	12	14	12	39	46	50	Vágner Love	13	3rd	DNP
2013	16th	38	12	13	13	43	46	49	Hernane	16	2nd	W
2014	10th	38	14	10	14	46	47	52	Eduardo da Silva	8	1st	SF
2015	12th	38	15	4	19	45	53	49	Alan Patrick	7	3rd	R16
2016	3rd	38	20	11	7	52	35	71	Paolo Guerrero	9	4th	2R
2017	6th	38	15	11	12	49	38	56	Diego Ribas	10	1st	RU
2018	2nd	38	21	9	8	59	29	72	Lucas Paquetá	10	3rd	SF
2019	1st	38	28	6	4	86	37	90	Gabriel Barbosa	25	1st	QF
2020	1st	38	21	8	9	68	48	71	Gabriel Barbosa	14	1st	QF

Domestic results (2021–)
Season	Pos	G	W	D	L	GF	GA	Pts	Top league scorer	Goals	CC	CdB
2021	2nd	38	21	8	9	69	36	71	Michael	14	1st	SF
2022	5th	38	18	8	12	60	39	62	Gabriel Barbosa, Pedro	11	2nd	W
2023	4th	38	19	9	10	56	42	66	Pedro	13	2nd	RU
2024	3rd	38	20	10	8	61	42	70	Pedro	11	1st	W
2025	1st	38	23	10	5	78	27	79	Giorgian de Arrascaeta	18	1st	R16

Key

W = Winners; RU = Runners-up; SF = Semi-finals; QF = Quarter-finals; R16 = Round of 16; R32 = Round of 32; 3R = Third round; 2R = Second round; DNQ = Did not qualify; DNP = Did not participate

=== International results ===
Below are Flamengo's results in official international competitions since the club's first qualification to the Copa Libertadores in 1981. Group stage match results are listed with the home match first.

As of 17 September 2026

Competition	Pld	W	D	L	GF	GA	GD	Win%
Copa Libertadores	203	116	43	44	375	203	+172	57.14
Copa Sudamericana	24	10	7	7	37	30	+7	41.67
Recopa Sudamericana	6	2	1	3	8	7	+1	33.33
Copa Mercosur^{†}	38	18	10	10	72	44	+28	47.37
Supercopa Libertadores^{†}	46	21	11	14	60	47	+13	45.65
Copa de Oro^{†}	2	2	0	0	5	2	+3	100.00
Intercontinental Cup^{†}	1	1	0	0	3	0	+3	100.00
FIFA Intercontinental Cup	3	2	1	0	5	2	+3	66.67
FIFA Club World Cup	8	4	1	3	17	13	+4	50.00
Total	331	176	74	81	582	348	+234	53.17

^{†} Defunct competitions

International competitive match results
Season	Competition	Round	Opponent	Results	Competition result
1981	Copa Libertadores	Group stage	(Brazil) Atlético Mineiro	2–2, 2–2, 0–0 (N)*	Champions
1981	Copa Libertadores	Group stage	(Paraguay) Cerro Porteño	5–2, 4–2	Champions
1981	Copa Libertadores	Group stage	(Paraguay) Olimpia	1–1, 0–0	Champions
1981	Copa Libertadores	Semi-finals	(Colombia) Deportivo Cali	3–0, 1–0	Champions
1981	Copa Libertadores	Semi-finals	(Bolivia) Jorge Wilstermann	4–1, 2–1	Champions
1981	Copa Libertadores	Finals	(Chile) Cobreloa	2–1 (H), 0–1 (A), 2–0 (N)*	Champions
1981	Intercontinental Cup	Final	(England) Liverpool	3–0 (N)	Champions
1982	Copa Libertadores	Semi-finals	(Uruguay) Peñarol	0–1, 0–1	Semi-finals
1982	Copa Libertadores	Semi-finals	(Argentina) River Plate	4–2, 3–0	Semi-finals
1983	Copa Libertadores	Group stage	(Brazil) Grêmio	1–3, 1–1	Group stage
1983	Copa Libertadores	Group stage	(Bolivia) Blooming	7–1, 0–0	Group stage
1983	Copa Libertadores	Group stage	(Bolivia) Bolívar	5–2, 1–3	Group stage
1984	Copa Libertadores	Group stage	(Brazil) Santos	4–1, 5–0	Semi-finals
1984	Copa Libertadores	Group stage	(Colombia) América de Cali	4–2, 1–1	Semi-finals
1984	Copa Libertadores	Group stage	(Colombia) Junior	3–1, 2–1	Semi-finals
1984	Copa Libertadores	Semi-finals	(Brazil) Grêmio	3–1, 1–5, 0–0 (N)*	Semi-finals
1984	Copa Libertadores	Semi-finals	(Venezuela) Universidad de Los Andes	2–1, 3–0	Semi-finals
1988	Supercopa Libertadores	First round	(Argentina) Estudiantes	1–1 (A), 3–0 (H)	Quarter-finals
1988	Supercopa Libertadores	Quarter-finals	(Uruguay) Nacional	0–3 (A), 0–2 (H)	Quarter-finals
1989	Supercopa Libertadores	First round	(Argentina) Argentinos Juniors	0–1 (H), 1–2 (A)	First round
1990	Supercopa Libertadores	First round	(Argentina) Argentinos Juniors	1–3 (A), 3–1 (3–4p) (H)	First round
1991	Supercopa Libertadores	First round	(Argentina) Estudiantes	1–1 (H), 2–0 (A)	Quarter-finals
1991	Supercopa Libertadores	Quarter-finals	(Argentina) River Plate	0–1 (A), 2–1 (3–4p) (H)	Quarter-finals
1991	Copa Libertadores	Group stage	(Brazil) Corinthians	1–1, 2–0	Quarter-finals
1991	Copa Libertadores	Group stage	(Uruguay) Bella Vista	1–1, 2–2	Quarter-finals
1991	Copa Libertadores	Group stage	(Uruguay) Nacional	4–0, 1–0	Quarter-finals
1991	Copa Libertadores	Round of 16	(Venezuela) Deportivo Táchira	3–2 (A), 5–0 (H)	Quarter-finals
1991	Copa Libertadores	Quarter-finals	(Argentina) Boca Juniors	2–1 (H), 0–3 (A)	Quarter-finals
1992	Supercopa Libertadores	First round	(Brazil) Grêmio	1–1 (A), 1–0 (H)	Semi-finals
1992	Supercopa Libertadores	Quarter-finals	(Argentina) Estudiantes	1–0 (H), 1–1 (A)	Semi-finals
1992	Supercopa Libertadores	Semi-finals	(Argentina) Racing	3–3 (H), 0–1 (A)	Semi-finals
1993	Supercopa Libertadores	First round	(Paraguay) Olimpia	0–1 (A), 3–1 (H)	Runners-up
1993	Supercopa Libertadores	Quarter-finals	(Argentina) River Plate	1–2 (A), 1–0 (6–5p) (H)	Runners-up
1993	Supercopa Libertadores	Semi-finals	(Uruguay) Nacional	2–1 (H), 3–0 (A)	Runners-up
1993	Supercopa Libertadores	Finals	(Brazil) São Paulo	2–2 (H), 2–2 (3–5p) (A)	Runners-up
1993	Copa Libertadores	Group stage	(Colombia) América de Cali	1–3, 1–2	Quarter-finals
1993	Copa Libertadores	Group stage	(Colombia) Atlético Nacional	3–1, 1–0	Quarter-finals
1993	Copa Libertadores	Group stage	(Brazil) Internacional	3–1, 0–0	Quarter-finals
1993	Copa Libertadores	Round of 16	(Venezuela) Minervén	8–2 (H), 1–0 (A)	Quarter-finals
1993	Copa Libertadores	Quarter-finals	(Brazil) São Paulo	1–1 (H), 0–2 (A)	Quarter-finals
1994	Supercopa Libertadores	Round of 16	(Argentina) Estudiantes	0–0 (H), 0–2 (A)	Round of 16
1995	Supercopa Libertadores	First round	(Argentina) Vélez Sarsfield	3–2 (A), 3–0 (H)	Runners-up
1995	Supercopa Libertadores	Quarter-finals	(Uruguay) Nacional	1–0 (A), 1–0 (H)	Runners-up
1995	Supercopa Libertadores	Semi-finals	(Brazil) Cruzeiro	1–0 (A), 3–1 (H)	Runners-up
1995	Supercopa Libertadores	Finals	(Argentina) Independiente	0–2 (A), 1–0 (H)	Runners-up
1996	Copa de Oro	Semi-finals	(Argentina) Rosario Central	2–1 (N)	Champions
1996	Copa de Oro	Finals	(Brazil) São Paulo	3–1 (N)	Champions
1996	Supercopa Libertadores	First round	(Argentina) Independiente	0–0 (A), 1–0 (H)	Quarter-finals
1996	Supercopa Libertadores	Quarter-finals	(Chile) Colo-Colo	1–1 (H), 0–1 (A)	Quarter-finals
1997	Supercopa Libertadores	Group stage	(Brazil) São Paulo	3–2, 0–1	Group stage
1997	Supercopa Libertadores	Group stage	(Paraguay) Olimpia	3–3, 1–0	Group stage
1997	Supercopa Libertadores	Group stage	(Argentina) Vélez Sarsfield	0–1, 3–0	Group stage
1998	Copa Mercosul	Group stage	(Paraguay) Cerro Porteño	2–0, 3–2	Group stage
1998	Copa Mercosul	Group stage	(Argentina) Vélez Sarsfield	2–0, 0–1	Group stage
1998	Copa Mercosul	Group stage	(Argentina) Boca Juniors	0–2, 0–3	Group stage
1999	Copa Mercosul	Group stage	(Paraguay) Olimpia	2–1, 1–3	Champions
1999	Copa Mercosul	Group stage	(Chile) Colo-Colo	2–2, 4–0	Champions
1999	Copa Mercosul	Group stage	Universidad de Chile	7–0, 0–2	Champions
1999	Copa Mercosul	Quarter-finals	(Argentina) Independiente	1–1 (A), 4–0 (H)	Champions
1999	Copa Mercosul	Semi-finals	(Uruguay) Peñarol	3–0 (H), 2–3 (A)	Champions
1999	Copa Mercosul	Finals	(Brazil) Palmeiras	4–3 (H), 3–3 (A)	Champions
2000	Copa Mercosul	Group stage	(Argentina) River Plate	1–2, 1–1	Quarter-finals
2000	Copa Mercosul	Group stage	Universidad de Chile	2–0, 4–0	Quarter-finals
2000	Copa Mercosul	Group stage	(Argentina) Vélez Sarsfield	2–0, 1–1	Quarter-finals
2000	Copa Mercosul	Quarter-finals	(Argentina) River Plate	1–2 (H), 3–4 (A)	Quarter-finals
2001	Copa Mercosul	Group stage	(Uruguay) Nacional	2–0, 1–4	Runners-up
2001	Copa Mercosul	Group stage	(Argentina) San Lorenzo	2–1, 2–1	Runners-up
2001	Copa Mercosul	Group stage	(Paraguay) Olimpia	2–0 (w/o), 2–0	Runners-up
2001	Copa Mercosul	Quarter-finals	(Argentina) Independiente	0–0 (A), 4–0 (H)	Runners-up
2001	Copa Mercosul	Semi-finals	(Brazil) Grêmio	2–2 (H), 0–0 (4–1p) (A)	Runners-up
2001	Copa Mercosul	Finals	(Argentina) San Lorenzo	0–0 (H), 1–1 (3–4p) (A)	Runners-up
2002	Copa Libertadores	Group stage	(Paraguay) Olimpia	0–0, 0–2	Group stage
2002	Copa Libertadores	Group stage	(Chile) Universidad Católica	1–3, 1–2	Group stage
2002	Copa Libertadores	Group stage	(Colombia) Once Caldas	4–1, 0–1	Group stage
2003	Copa Sudamericana	First stage	(Brazil) Internacional	1–3 (A)	First stage
2003	Copa Sudamericana	First stage	(Brazil) Santos	0–3 (H)	First stage
2004	Copa Sudamericana	First stage	(Brazil) Santos	0–0 (A), 2–2 (5–4p) (H)	First stage
2007	Copa Libertadores	Group stage	(Bolivia) Real Potosí	1–0, 2–2	Round of 16
2007	Copa Libertadores	Group stage	(Venezuela) Unión Maracaibo	3–1, 2–1	Round of 16
2007	Copa Libertadores	Group stage	(Brazil) Paraná Clube	1–0, 1–0	Round of 16
2007	Copa Libertadores	Round of 16	(Uruguay) Defensor	0–3 (A), 2–0 (H)	Round of 16
2008	Copa Libertadores	Group stage	(Peru) Coronel Bolognesi	2–0, 0–0	Round of 16
2008	Copa Libertadores	Group stage	(Peru) Cienciano	2–1, 3–0	Round of 16
2008	Copa Libertadores	Group stage	(Uruguay) Nacional	2–0, 0–3	Round of 16
2008	Copa Libertadores	Round of 16	(Mexico) América	4–2 (A), 0–3 (H)	Round of 16
2009	Copa Sudamericana	First stage	(Brazil) Fluminense	0–0 (A)**, 1–1 (H)**	First stage
2010	Copa Libertadores	Group stage	(Chile) Universidad Católica	2–0, 2–2	Quarter-finals
2010	Copa Libertadores	Group stage	(Venezuela) Caracas	3–2, 3–1	Quarter-finals
2010	Copa Libertadores	Group stage	Universidad de Chile	2–2, 1–2	Quarter-finals
2010	Copa Libertadores	Round of 16	(Brazil) Corinthians	1–0 (H), 1–2 (A)	Quarter-finals
2010	Copa Libertadores	Quarter-finals	Universidad de Chile	2–3 (H), 2–1 (A)	Quarter-finals
2011	Copa Sudamericana	Second stage	(Brazil) Atlético Paranaense	1–0 (H), 1–0 (A)	Round of 16
2011	Copa Sudamericana	Round of 16	Universidad de Chile	0–4 (H), 0–1 (A)	Round of 16
2012	Copa Libertadores	First stage	(Bolivia) Real Potosí	1–2 (A), 2–0 (H)	Group stage
2012	Copa Libertadores	Group stage	(Argentina) Lanús	3–0, 1–1	Group stage
2012	Copa Libertadores	Group stage	(Ecuador) Emelec	1–0, 2–3	Group stage
2012	Copa Libertadores	Group stage	(Paraguay) Olimpia	3–3, 2–3	Group stage
2014	Copa Libertadores	Group stage	(Mexico) León	2–3, 1–2	Group stage
2014	Copa Libertadores	Group stage	(Ecuador) Emelec	3–1, 2–1	Group stage
2014	Copa Libertadores	Group stage	(Bolivia) Bolívar	2–2, 0–1	Group stage
2016	Copa Sudamericana	Second stage	(Brazil) Figueirense	2–4 (A), 3–1 (H)	Round of 16
2016	Copa Sudamericana	Round of 16	(Chile) Palestino	1–0 (A), 1–2 (H)	Round of 16
2017	Copa Libertadores	Group stage	(Argentina) San Lorenzo	4–0, 1–2	Group stage
2017	Copa Libertadores	Group stage	(Chile) Universidad Católica	3–1, 0–1	Group stage
2017	Copa Libertadores	Group stage	(Brazil) Atlético Paranaense	2–1, 1–2	Group stage
2017	Copa Sudamericana	Second stage	(Chile) Palestino	5–2 (A), 5–0 (H)	Runners-up
2017	Copa Sudamericana	Round of 16	(Brazil) Chapecoense	0–0 (A), 4–0 (H)	Runners-up
2017	Copa Sudamericana	Quarter-finals	(Brazil) Fluminense	1–0 (A)**, 3–3 (H)**	Runners-up
2017	Copa Sudamericana	Semi-finals	(Colombia) Junior	2–1 (H), 2–0 (A)	Runners-up
2017	Copa Sudamericana	Finals	(Argentina) Independiente	1–2 (A), 1–1 (H)	Runners-up
2018	Copa Libertadores	Group stage	(Argentina) River Plate	2–2, 0–0	Round of 16
2018	Copa Libertadores	Group stage	(Ecuador) Emelec	2–0, 2–1	Round of 16
2018	Copa Libertadores	Group stage	(Colombia) Santa Fe	1–1, 0–0	Round of 16
2018	Copa Libertadores	Round of 16	(Brazil) Cruzeiro	0–2 (H), 1–0 (A)	Round of 16
2019	Copa Libertadores	Group stage	(Bolivia) San José	6–1, 1–0	Champions
2019	Copa Libertadores	Group stage	(Ecuador) LDU Quito	3–1, 1–2	Champions
2019	Copa Libertadores	Group stage	(Uruguay) Peñarol	0–1, 0–0	Champions
2019	Copa Libertadores	Round of 16	(Ecuador) Emelec	0–2 (A), 2–0 (4–2p) (H)	Champions
2019	Copa Libertadores	Quarter-finals	(Brazil) Internacional	2–0 (H), 1–1 (A)	Champions
2019	Copa Libertadores	Semi-finals	(Brazil) Grêmio	1–1 (A), 5–0 (H)	Champions
2019	Copa Libertadores	Final	(Argentina) River Plate	2–1 (N)	Champions
2019	FIFA Club World Cup	Semi-finals	(Saudi Arabia) Al-Hilal	3–1 (N)	Runners-up
2019	FIFA Club World Cup	Final	(England) Liverpool	0–0 (0–1 a.e.t) (N)	Runners-up
2020	Recopa Sudamericana	Final	(Ecuador) Independiente del Valle	2–2 (A), 3–0 (H)	Champions
2020	Copa Libertadores	Group stage	(Colombia) Junior	3–1, 2–1	Round of 16
2020	Copa Libertadores	Group stage	(Ecuador) Independiente del Valle	4–0, 0–5	Round of 16
2020	Copa Libertadores	Group stage	(Ecuador) Barcelona	3–0, 2–1	Round of 16
2020	Copa Libertadores	Round of 16	(Argentina) Racing	1–1 (A), 1–1 (3–5p) (H)	Round of 16
2021	Copa Libertadores	Group stage	(Ecuador) LDU Quito	2–2, 3–2	Runners-up
2021	Copa Libertadores	Group stage	(Argentina) Vélez Sarsfield	0–0, 3–2	Runners-up
2021	Copa Libertadores	Group stage	(Chile) Unión La Calera	4–1, 2–2	Runners-up
2021	Copa Libertadores	Round of 16	(Argentina) Defensa y Justicia	1–0 (A), 4–1 (H)	Runners-up
2021	Copa Libertadores	Quarter-finals	(Paraguay) Olimpia	4–1 (A), 5–1 (H)	Runners-up
2021	Copa Libertadores	Semi-finals	(Ecuador) Barcelona	2–0 (H), 2–0 (A)	Runners-up
2021	Copa Libertadores	Final	(Brazil) Palmeiras	1–1 (1–2 a.e.t) (N)	Runners-up
2022	Copa Libertadores	Group stage	(Chile) Universidad Católica	3–0, 3–2	Champions
2022	Copa Libertadores	Group stage	(Peru) Sporting Cristal	2–1, 2–0	Champions
2022	Copa Libertadores	Group stage	(Argentina) Talleres	3–1, 2–2	Champions
2022	Copa Libertadores	Round of 16	(Colombia) Deportes Tolima	1–0 (A), 8–1 (H)	Champions
2022	Copa Libertadores	Quarter-finals	(Brazil) Corinthians	2–0 (A), 1–0 (H)	Champions
2022	Copa Libertadores	Semi-finals	(Argentina) Vélez Sarsfield	4–0 (A), 2–1 (H)	Champions
2022	Copa Libertadores	Final	(Brazil) Athletico Paranaense	1–0 (N)	Champions
2023	FIFA Club World Cup	Semi-finals	(Saudi Arabia) Al Hilal	2–3 (N)	3rd place
2023	FIFA Club World Cup	Third place match	(Egypt) Al Ahly	4–2 (N)	3rd place
2023	Recopa Sudamericana	Final	(Ecuador) Independiente del Valle	0–1 (A), 1–0 (4–5p) (H)	Runners-up
2023	Copa Libertadores	Group stage	(Argentina) Racing	2–1, 1–1	Round of 16
2023	Copa Libertadores	Group stage	(Ecuador) Aucas	2–0, 1–2	Round of 16
2023	Copa Libertadores	Group stage	(Chile) Ñublense	2–0, 1–1	Round of 16
2023	Copa Libertadores	Round of 16	(Paraguay) Olimpia	1–0 (H), 1–3 (A)	Round of 16
2024	Copa Libertadores	Group stage	(Bolivia) Bolívar	4–0, 1–2	Quarter-finals
2024	Copa Libertadores	Group stage	(Colombia) Millonarios	3–0, 1–1	Quarter-finals
2024	Copa Libertadores	Group stage	(Chile) Palestino	2–0, 0–1	Quarter-finals
2024	Copa Libertadores	Round of 16	(Bolivia) Bolívar	2–0 (H), 0–1 (A)	Quarter-finals
2024	Copa Libertadores	Quarter-finals	(Uruguay) Peñarol	0–1 (H), 0–0 (A)	Quarter-finals
2025	Copa Libertadores	Group stage	(Ecuador) LDU Quito	2–0, 0–0	Champions
2025	Copa Libertadores	Group stage	(Venezuela) Deportivo Táchira	1–0, 1–0	Champions
2025	Copa Libertadores	Group stage	(Argentina) Central Córdoba	1–2, 1–1	Champions
2025	Copa Libertadores	Round of 16	(Brazil) Internacional	1–0 (H), 2–0 (A)	Champions
2025	Copa Libertadores	Quarter-finals	(Argentina) Estudiantes	2–1 (H), 0–1 (4–2p) (A)	Champions
2025	Copa Libertadores	Semi-finals	(Argentina) Racing	1–0 (H), 0–0 (A)	Champions
2025	Copa Libertadores	Final	(Brazil) Palmeiras	1–0 (N)	Champions
2025	FIFA Club World Cup	Group stage	(Tunisia) Espérance de Tunis	2–0 (N)	Round of 16
2025	FIFA Club World Cup	Group stage	(England) Chelsea	3–1 (N)	Round of 16
2025	FIFA Club World Cup	Group stage	(United States) Los Angeles FC	1–1 (N)	Round of 16
2025	FIFA Club World Cup	Round of 16	(Germany) Bayern Munich	2–4 (N)	Round of 16
2025	Intercontinental Cup	Derby of the Americas	(Mexico) Cruz Azul	2–1 (N)	Runners-up
2025	Intercontinental Cup	Challenger Cup	(Egypt) Pyramids	2–0 (N)	Runners-up
2025	Intercontinental Cup	Final	(France) Paris Saint-Germain	1–1 (1–1 a.e.t) (1–2p) (N)	Runners-up
2026	Recopa Sudamericana	Final	(Argentina) Lanús	0–1 (A), 2–3 (H)	Runners-up
2026	Copa Libertadores	Group stage	(Peru) Cusco	2–0, 3–0	
2026	Copa Libertadores	Group stage	(Colombia) Independiente Medellín	4–1, 3–0	
2026	Copa Libertadores	Group stage	(Argentina) Estudiantes	1–1, 1–0	
2026	Copa Libertadores	Round of 16	(Brazil) Cruzeiro	2–1 (H), 1–1 (A)	
2026	Copa Libertadores	Quarter-finals	(Ecuador) Independiente del Valle	2–0 (A), 1–1 (H)	
2026	Copa Libertadores	Semi-finals	(Argentina) Estudiantes	TBD (A), TBD (H)	

(H) – Home; (A) – Away; (N) – Neutral
* Tiebreaker match
** Both matches played at the same stadium

== Current board of directors ==
As of 9 December 2024

Office	Name
President	(Brazil) Luiz Eduardo Baptista
Vice-president	(Brazil) Flávio Willeman
Vice-president of administration	(Brazil) Ricardo Campelo Trevia de Almeida
Vice-president of communications and marketing	(Brazil) Gustavo Carvalho de Oliveira
Vice-president of Olympic sports	(Brazil) Guilherme de Lima Kroll
Vice-president of finance	(Brazil) Rodrigo Tostes Solon de Pontes
Vice-president of Fla-Gávea	(Brazil) Getúlio Brasil Nunes
Vice-president of football	(Brazil) Marcos Teixeira Braz
Vice-president of the presidential cabinet	(Brazil) Marcelo Conti Baltazar
Vice-president of heritage	(Brazil) Artur Rocha Neto
Vice-president of historic heritage	(Brazil) Luis Fernando Fadigas de Almeida
Vice-president of planning	(Brazil) Bernardo Amaral do Amaral
Vice-president of external relations	(Brazil) Adalberto Ribeiro da Silva Neto
Vice-president of rowing	(Brazil) Raul Bagattini
Vice-president of the general secretary	(Brazil) Paulo Cesar dos Santos Pereira Filho
Vice-president of information technology	(Brazil) Alexandre de Souza Pinto

== Other sports ==
=== Men's basketball ===
Flamengo basketball won the Rio de Janeiro City Championship in 1919 and have since grown to be one of the most successful and supported basketball teams in the country. The club have won six Brazilian Championships, a record 44 Rio de Janeiro State Championships, the 1953 South American Championship of Champions Clubs, and the 2009 South American League.

In 2014, Flamengo won the League of the Americas without a single loss, defeating Pinheiros in the final. This qualified Flamengo to their first Intercontinental Cup against EuroLeague champions Maccabi Tel Aviv. Flamengo won and became the second Brazilian basketball team in history to be world champions. Flamengo, Real Madrid and Barcelona are the only clubs to have won the Intercontinental Cups in both football and basketball.

Flamengo hosted and participated in the 2019 FIBA Intercontinental Cup, falling to BCL champions AEK Athens in the final.

==== Honours ====
- Novo Basquete Brasil (NBB): 7

2009, 2012–13, 2013–14, 2014–15, 2015–16, 2018–19, 2020–21

- Campeonato Brasileiro de Basquete: 1

2008

- Super 8 Cup: 4

2018, 2020–21, 2023–24, 2024–25

- South American Championship of Champions Clubs: 1

1953

- FIBA South American League (LSB): 1

2009 (I)

- FIBA Americas League / Champions League: 3

2014, 2020–21, 2024–25

- FIBA Intercontinental Cup: 2

2014, 2022

=== Women's football ===
Between 1995 and 2001, the Flamengo women's football team competed in the Campeonato Carioca. In 2002 the women's Carioca tournament was not organized, and the club ceased operation of the team. Flamengo attempted to re-establish their women's professional football department in 2011 through a partnership with the city of Guarujá, where the team trained, and hoped to sign Marta, but the team never materialized. In 2015 president Eduardo Bandeira de Mello succeeded in establishing the football team through a partnership with the Brazilian Navy. In their first season, the team won the women's Campeonato Carioca state championship and have won it every season from 2015 to 2019. In 2016 Flamengo won the Campeonato Brasileiro de Futebol Feminino for the first time against Rio Preto, becoming the only club outside the state of São Paulo to win the tournament since its creation in 2013. Flamengo also competed in the 2016 and 2017 Copa do Brasil de Futebol Feminino before the cancellation of the competition in favor of the Campeonato Brasileiro.

==== Honors ====
- Campeonato Brasileiro de Futebol Feminino Série A1: 1

2016

- Campeonato Carioca de Futebol Feminino: 9

2015, 2016, 2017, 2018, 2019, 2021, 2023, 2024, 2025

- Copa Rio de Futebol Feminino: 2

2023, 2025

=== Women's basketball ===
The Flamengo women's basketball team won back-to-back Brazilian championships in 1954 and 1955. Ten years later with some of the same players, the program won back-to-back Brazilian titles again in 1964 and 1965. Flamengo players Norminha, Angelina, Marlene and Delei were champions of the 1967 Pan American Games in Winnipeg with the Brazil women's national basketball team.

In 1966 Flamengo won the Inter-club Basketball World Championship. The team was led by Angelina, considered one of the best players of her time.

=== Rowing ===
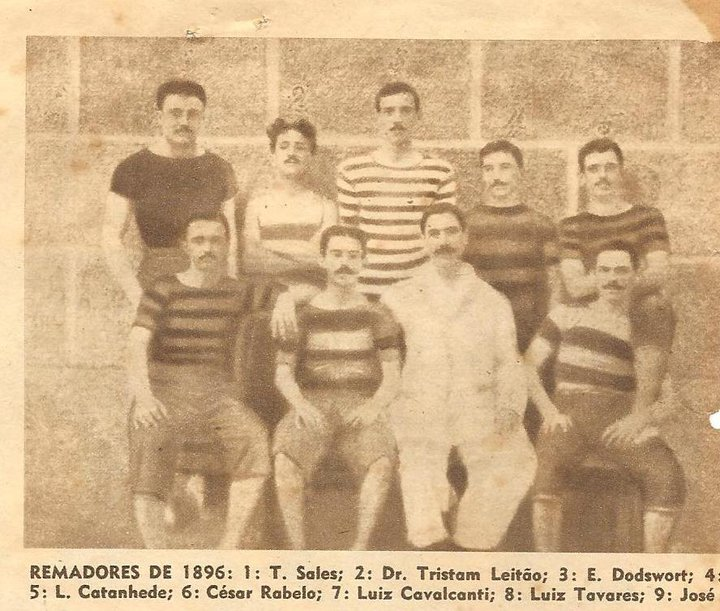
One of the firsts rowing teams of the club, in 1896.

The "Flamengo Regatta Group", later renamed the "Flamengo Regatta Club", was established in 1895 as Flamengo's first ever organized athletic department, forming the basis of the club's history and identity to this day. The first regatta victory came in 1898 in the Nautical Championship of Brazil, and the first title was won in 1900, the Regatta of the IV Centenary of the Discovery of Brazil, for which the club was awarded the Jug Tropon trophy. In 1905 the club won a classic event, the South American Cup. By 1908, Flamengo had already won 43 gold, 126 silver and 141 bronze medals. The success of the rowing club made the team famous even before the founding of the football department in 1911. Great rowers such as Everardo Paes de Lima, Arnaldo Voigt, Alfredo Correia ("Boca Larga"), Ângelo Gammaro ("Angelú") and Antônio Rebello Junior ("Engole Garfo") came through Flamengo, the latter three being considered Brazilian sports heroes for completing the Rio-Santos crossing in 1932.

From 1931 to 1937 Flamengo were seven-time champions of Rio de Janeiro, and were four-time repeat state champions from 1940 to 1943. In 1963 the "Buck era" began, which revolutionized Flamengo rowing. The coach brought in athletes from other states and renovated the club's facilities to better accommodate the boats. Buck coached the Brazil national team, directing the team in several international competitions. In the early 1980s, Flamengo won the state championship and won again in 1992. The club has won the men's Brazil Trophy 10 times, and the female once, in addition to 45 Carioca state titles.

=== Water polo ===
Water polo is the second oldest sport practiced by the club, after rowing. The team played their first game on 27 May 1913, in Rio de Janeiro, and defeated Clube Internacional de Regatas, 3–2. Flamengo only opened its water sports facility in 1965. Prior to that, athletes played and trained in the Rodrigo de Freitas Lagoon or in the sea. Flamengo's first polo championship in Rio de Janeiro came in 1985 and was the start of a run of nine consecutive championships through 1993. In 1985 the club won the South American Club Championship and the Brazil Trophy (also won four consecutive times). A female water polo team was established in 1987, winning the Brazil Trophy in 1987 and 1991 and the state championship in 1995.

=== American football ===
The club launched their American football team in 2013, forming a partnership with the Rio de Janeiro Emperors. The Emperors were established in 2008 and had previously partnered with Fluminense from 2010 to 2013. The team officially goes by the name of the Flamengo Emperors and compete in the BFA (Brasil Futebol Americano).

=== Tennis ===
Flamengo began playing tennis championships in 1916 and became three-time Rio champions soon after (1916–18), even with their athletes training at other clubs. Until 1932 the club practiced tennis on their football field at the Rua Paysandu. In 1963 the club inaugurated their own facilities and courts. The biggest idol of Flamengo's tennis department is Thomas Koch.

=== E-sports ===
In 2017 the club announced they would be entering the increasingly popular e-sports leagues the following year, beginning with a League of Legends department and eventually establishing a PES team. Because the competitive League of Legends center of Brazil is at the Riot Games studio in São Paulo, Flamengo established a permanent "gaming office" for the team in the city. Flamengo announced that they would not be partnering with an existing team but rather would have their own team. In October 2017 they announced the purchase of Merciless Gaming, a team in the second division of the Brazilian League of Legends championship.

=== Additional sports departments ===
- Artistic gymnastics
- Auto racing (Flamengo Superleague Formula team)
- Beach soccer
- Bocce
- CP football
- Futsal
- Indoor soccer
- Judo
- Swimming
- Synchronized swimming
- Volleyball

== See also ==
- CR Flamengo (women)
- CR Flamengo (youth)
- Flamengo Basketball
- Clube de Regatas do Flamengo (beach soccer)
- CR Flamengo (Superleague Formula team)
- Flamengo Esports
- Clássico dos Milhões
- Fla–Flu
- Atlético Mineiro–Flamengo rivalry
- List of world champion football clubs
