= 1967 Campeonato Gaúcho =

Campeonato Gaúcho
- Season: 1966
- Dates: 9 July – 17 December
- Champions: Grêmio (18th title)
- Taça Brasil: Grêmio
- Matches played: 132
- Goals scored: 309 (2.34 per match)
- Top goalscorer: Nico (17 goals)

The 1967 Campeonato Gaúcho was the 47th season of Rio Grande do Sul's top association football league. Grêmio won their 18th title.

== Format ==
The championship was contested by the twelve teams in a double round-robin system, with the team with the most points winning the title and qualifying to the 1967 Taça Brasil. The last placed team would be relegated to the 1968 Second Division, but was spared from relegation year after the Rio Grande do Sul's FA deciding that the 1968 season was going to be contested by 18 teams.

== Teams ==
Club	Location	Titles	Last season
Aimoré	São Leopoldo	0	4th
Brasil de Pelotas	Pelotas	1	8th
Farroupilha	Pelotas	1	7th
Floriano^{A}	Novo Hamburgo	0	6th
Gaúcho	Passo Fundo	0	1st (Second Division)
Grêmio	Porto Alegre	17	1st
Guarany	Bagé	2	11th
Internacional	Porto Alegre	16	2nd
Juventude	Caxias do Sul	0	3rd
Pelotas	Pelotas	1	5th
Riograndense	Rio Grande	0	10th
Rio Grande	Rio Grande	1	9th

A. Novo Hamburgo was known as Floriano from 1942 until 1968.

== Championship ==
Pos	Team	Pld	W	D	L	GF	GA	GD	Pts	Qualification or relegation
1	Grêmio (C)	22	16	4	2	42	11	+31	36	Qualification to 1968 Taça Brasil
2	Internacional	22	13	7	2	28	10	+18	33	
3	Farroupilha	22	11	6	5	26	18	+8	28	
4	Guarany (BG)	22	7	8	7	29	28	+1	22	
5	Gaúcho	22	9	3	10	22	27	−5	21	
6	Brasil de Pelotas	22	7	6	9	23	23	0	20	
7	Juventude	22	7	6	9	27	29	−2	20	
8	Riograndense (RG)	22	7	5	10	23	35	−12	19	
9	Pelotas	22	6	7	9	17	29	−12	19	
10	Rio Grande	22	6	6	10	22	33	−11	18	
11	Aimoré	22	5	5	12	25	30	−5	15	
12	Floriano	22	5	3	14	25	36	−11	13	Spared from relegation

(C) Champions
