= Super Series Manaus =

2015 Super Series Manaus Summer Tournament
Tournament details
- Country: Brazil; Manaus, Amazonas
- Teams: 3

Final positions
- Champions: Flamengo
- Runners-up: São Paulo
- Third place: Vasco da Gama

Tournament statistics
- Matches played: 3
- Goals scored: 5 (1.67 per match)

The Super Series, also known as Torneio de Verão de Manaus (English: Manaus Summer Tournament) was a pre-season tournament realized in 2015, in the city of Manaus, Amazonas between January 21 and 25.

A curiosity about this tournament was that before the matches, instead of playing the Brazilian National Anthem, as usual, the clubs anthem was played.

== Participants ==
Club	State	City
Flamengo	(Rio de Janeiro (state)) RJ	Rio de Janeiro
São Paulo	(São Paulo (state)) SP	São Paulo
Vasco da Gama	(Rio de Janeiro (state)) RJ	Rio de Janeiro

== Matches ==
Jan 21
20:00 (UTC-4)

Flamengo (Rio de Janeiro (state))	1–0	(Rio de Janeiro (state)) Vasco da Gama
Everton 53'	Report

Arena da Amazonia, Manaus
Attendance: 21.915
Referee: Edmar Campos da Encarnação

Jan 23
20:00 (UTC-4)

Vasco da Gama (Rio de Janeiro (state))	1–2	(São Paulo (state)) São Paulo
Bruno 32' (o.g.)	Report	Luís Fabiano 13'; Souza 77'

Arena da Amazonia, Manaus
Attendance: 8.929
Referee: João Batista Cunha de Brito

Jan 25
15:00 (UTC-4)

São Paulo (São Paulo (state))	0–1	(Rio de Janeiro (state)) Flamengo
	Report	Samir 77'

Arena da Amazonia, Manaus
Attendance: 23.973
Referee: Antonio Carlos Pequeno Frutuoso

== Final standings ==
Team	Pts	P	W	D	L	GF	GA	GD
(Rio de Janeiro (state)) Flamengo	6	3	2	0	0	2	0	2
(São Paulo (state)) São Paulo	3	3	1	0	1	2	2	0
(Rio de Janeiro (state)) Vasco da Gama	0	3	0	0	2	1	3	-2
