= 1968 Campeonato Brasileiro Série A =

1968 Campeonato Brasileiro Série A may stand for:

- 1968 Campeonato Brasileiro Série A (Taça Brasil)
- 1968 Campeonato Brasileiro Série A (Torneio Roberto Gomes Pedrosa)
