= List of Brazilian football champions =

This Brazilian football champions are the winners of the competitions recognized by Brazilian Football Confederation (CBF) as the Campeonato Brasileiro Série A, the top-flight football league of Brazil.

In 1933, the São Paulo State Football Federation and the Rio de Janeiro State Football Federation decided to create the Torneio Rio–São Paulo between teams from the two states. In 1937, the Torneio dos Campeões was disputed between four state champions teams from the Southeast region. In 1959, the CBD (the predecessor of the CBF) created the Taça Brasil with the objective of sending a representative club from the country to the inaugural Copa Libertadores. In 1966, the São Paulo and Rio de Janeiro state federations decided to expand Torneio Rio–São Paulo to the states of Minas Gerais, Paraná, and Rio Grande do Sul, and renamed it the Torneio Roberto Gomes Pedrosa, a change which took place in 1967. In 1969, the CBD discontinued the Taça Brasil and began organizing the Torneio Roberto Gomes Pedrosa, calling it the Taça de Prata some times.

In 1971, influenced by the Programa de Integração Nacional of the military regime, the CBD renamed the competition to Campeonato Nacional de Clubes, maintaining the same tournament format. Since then, different names was adopted and all subsequent editions have been organized by the CBD/CBF, with the exception of the 1987 Copa União and the 2000 edition organized by the Clube dos 13, but recognized later by the CBF.

On 13 December 2010, the CBF additionally recognized the winners of the Taça Brasil (1959–1968) and the Torneio Roberto Gomes Pedrosa (1967–1970) as Brazilian football champions. It has also briefely recognized the 1987 controversial edition as an edition with two champions, but was forced to backtrack on this decision later. In 25 August 2023, the 1937 Torneio dos Campeões was also recognized as an official title.

Since its first edition, 17 different clubs have won the league.

== List of champions ==
Source: RSSSF Brazil

- (In bracket, title count):

Ed.	Season	Champion	Runner-up	Third place	Winning manager	Top scorer(s)	Goals
Torneio dos Campeões (1937) (Note: CBF recognized the 1937 Torneio dos Campeões as Campeonato Brasileiro Série A in 25 August 2023.)
1	1937	(Minas Gerais) Atlético Mineiro (1)	(Rio de Janeiro (state)) Fluminense	(Espírito Santo) Rio Branco	(Brazil) Floriano Peixoto	(Brazil) Paulista (Atlético Mineiro)	8
Taça Brasil (1959–1966) (Note: CBF recognized the Taça Brasil and the Torneio Roberto Gomes Pedrosa as Campeonato Brasileiro Série A in 2010.)
2	1959	Bahia (1)	(São Paulo (state)) Santos	(Rio Grande do Sul) Grêmio	(Argentina) Carlos Volante	(Brazil) Léo Briglia (Bahia)	8
3	1960	(São Paulo (state)) Palmeiras (1)	(Ceará) Fortaleza	(Rio de Janeiro (state)) Fluminense	(Brazil) Osvaldo Brandão	(Brazil) Bececê (Fortaleza)	7
4	1961	(São Paulo (state)) Santos (1)	Bahia	(Rio de Janeiro (state)) America	(Brazil) Lula	(Brazil) Pelé (Santos)	7
5	1962	(São Paulo (state)) Santos (2)	(Rio de Janeiro (state)) Botafogo	(Rio Grande do Sul) Internacional	(Brazil) Lula	(Brazil) Coutinho (Santos)	7
6	1963	(São Paulo (state)) Santos (3)	Bahia	(Rio de Janeiro (state)) Botafogo	(Brazil) Lula	(Brazil) Pelé (Santos)	8
7	1964	(São Paulo (state)) Santos (4)	(Rio de Janeiro (state)) Flamengo	Ceará	(Brazil) Lula	(Brazil) Pelé (Santos) (Brazil) Gildo (Ceará)	7
8	1965	(São Paulo (state)) Santos (5)	(Rio de Janeiro (state)) Vasco da Gama	(Pernambuco) Náutico	(Brazil) Lula	(Brazil) Alcindo (Grêmio)	10
9	1966	(Minas Gerais) Cruzeiro (1)	(São Paulo (state)) Santos	(Pernambuco) Náutico	(Brazil) Ayrton Moreira	(Brazil) Bita (Náutico) (Brazil) Toninho Guerreiro (Santos)	10
Torneio Roberto Gomes Pedrosa (1967)
10	1967	(São Paulo (state)) Palmeiras (2)	(Rio Grande do Sul) Internacional	(São Paulo (state)) Corinthians	(Brazil) Mário Travaglini	(Brazil) Ademar Pantera (Flamengo) (Brazil) César Maluco (Palmeiras)	15
Taça Brasil (1967)
11	1967	(São Paulo (state)) Palmeiras (3)	(Pernambuco) Náutico	(Rio Grande do Sul) Grêmio	(Brazil) Aymoré Moreira	(Brazil) Chicletes (Treze)	9
Torneio Roberto Gomes Pedrosa (1968)
12	1968	(São Paulo (state)) Santos (6)	(Rio Grande do Sul) Internacional	(Rio de Janeiro (state)) Vasco da Gama	(Brazil) Antoninho	(Brazil) Toninho Guerreiro (Santos)	18
Taça Brasil (1968)
13	1968	(Rio de Janeiro (state)) Botafogo (1)	(Ceará) Fortaleza	(Minas Gerais) Cruzeiro	(Brazil) Mário Zagallo	(Brazil) Ferretti (Botafogo)	7
Torneio Roberto Gomes Pedrosa (1969–1970)
14	1969	(São Paulo (state)) Palmeiras (4)	(Minas Gerais) Cruzeiro	(São Paulo (state)) Corinthians	(Brazil) Rubens Minelli	(Brazil) Edu (America-RJ)	14
15	1970	(Rio de Janeiro (state)) Fluminense (1)	(São Paulo (state)) Palmeiras	(Minas Gerais) Atlético Mineiro	(Brazil) Paulo Amaral	(Brazil) Tostão (Cruzeiro)	12
Campeonato Nacional de Clubes (1971–1974)
16	1971	(Minas Gerais) Atlético Mineiro (2)	(São Paulo (state)) São Paulo	(Rio de Janeiro (state)) Botafogo	(Brazil) Telê Santana	(Brazil) Dadá Maravilha (Atlético Mineiro)	15
17	1972	(São Paulo (state)) Palmeiras (5)	(Rio de Janeiro (state)) Botafogo	(Rio Grande do Sul) Internacional	(Brazil) Osvaldo Brandão	(Brazil) Dadá Maravilha (Atlético Mineiro) (Uruguay) Pedro Rocha (São Paulo)	17
18	1973	(São Paulo (state)) Palmeiras (6)	(São Paulo (state)) São Paulo	(Minas Gerais) Cruzeiro	(Brazil) Osvaldo Brandão	(Brazil) Ramón (Santa Cruz)	21
19	1974	(Rio de Janeiro (state)) Vasco da Gama (1)	(Minas Gerais) Cruzeiro	(São Paulo (state)) Santos	(Brazil) Mário Travaglini	(Brazil) Roberto Dinamite (Vasco)	16
Copa Brasil (1975–1979)
20	1975	(Rio Grande do Sul) Internacional (1)	(Minas Gerais) Cruzeiro	(Rio de Janeiro (state)) Fluminense	(Brazil) Rubens Minelli	(Brazil) Flávio (Internacional)	16
21	1976	(Rio Grande do Sul) Internacional (2)	(São Paulo (state)) Corinthians	(Minas Gerais) Atlético Mineiro	(Brazil) Rubens Minelli	(Brazil) Dadá Maravilha (Internacional)	16
22	1977	(São Paulo (state)) São Paulo (1)	(Minas Gerais) Atlético Mineiro	(Mato Grosso do Sul) Operário	(Brazil) Rubens Minelli	(Brazil) Reinaldo (Atlético Mineiro)	28
23	1978	(São Paulo (state)) Guarani (1)	(São Paulo (state)) Palmeiras	(Rio Grande do Sul) Internacional	(Brazil) Carlos Alberto Silva	(Brazil) Paulinho (Vasco)	19
24	1979	(Rio Grande do Sul) Internacional (3)	(Rio de Janeiro (state)) Vasco da Gama	(Paraná (state)) Coritiba	(Brazil) Ênio Andrade	(Brazil) César (America-RJ)	13
Taça de Ouro (1980–1983)
25	1980	(Rio de Janeiro (state)) Flamengo (1)	(Minas Gerais) Atlético Mineiro	(Rio Grande do Sul) Internacional	(Brazil) Cláudio Coutinho	(Brazil) Zico (Flamengo)	21
26	1981	(Rio Grande do Sul) Grêmio (1)	(São Paulo (state)) São Paulo	(São Paulo (state)) Ponte Preta	(Brazil) Ênio Andrade	(Brazil) Nunes (Flamengo)	16
27	1982	(Rio de Janeiro (state)) Flamengo (2)	(Rio Grande do Sul) Grêmio	(São Paulo (state)) Guarani	(Brazil) Paulo César Carpegiani	(Brazil) Zico (Flamengo)	21
28	1983	(Rio de Janeiro (state)) Flamengo (3)	(São Paulo (state)) Santos	(Minas Gerais) Atlético Mineiro	(Brazil) Carlos Alberto Torres	(Brazil) Serginho Chulapa (Santos)	22
Copa Brasil (1984)
29	1984	(Rio de Janeiro (state)) Fluminense (2)	(Rio de Janeiro (state)) Vasco da Gama	(Rio Grande do Sul) Grêmio	(Brazil) Carlos Alberto Parreira	(Brazil) Roberto Dinamite (Vasco)	16
Taça de Ouro (1985)
30	1985	(Paraná (state)) Coritiba (1)	(Rio de Janeiro (state)) Bangu	(Rio Grande do Sul) Brasil de Pelotas	(Brazil) Ênio Andrade	(Brazil) Edmar (Guarani)	20
Copa Brasil (1986–1988)
31	1986	(São Paulo (state)) São Paulo (2)	(São Paulo (state)) Guarani	(Minas Gerais) Atlético Mineiro	(Brazil) Pepe	(Brazil) Careca (São Paulo)	25
32	1987	(Pernambuco) Sport Recife (1) (Note: Flamengo has claimed the title of the Green Module (Copa União), organized by Clube dos 13, who refused to play against Sport Recife, the Yellow Module winners, organized by CBF. However, the club lost in all instances, thus the only officially recognized champion being Sport Recife.)	(São Paulo (state)) Guarani	(Rio de Janeiro (state)) Flamengo	(Brazil) Jair Picerni	(Brazil) Müller (São Paulo)	10
33	1988	Bahia (2)	(Rio Grande do Sul) Internacional	(Rio de Janeiro (state)) Fluminense	(Brazil) Evaristo de Macedo	(Brazil) Nílson (Internacional)	15
Campeonato Brasileiro Série A (1989–1999)
34	1989	(Rio de Janeiro (state)) Vasco da Gama (2)	(São Paulo (state)) São Paulo	(Minas Gerais) Cruzeiro	(Brazil) Nelsinho Rosa	(Brazil) Túlio (Goiás)	11
35	1990	(São Paulo (state)) Corinthians (1)	(São Paulo (state)) São Paulo	(Rio Grande do Sul) Grêmio	(Brazil) Nelsinho Baptista	(Brazil) Charles (Bahia)	11
36	1991	(São Paulo (state)) São Paulo (3)	(São Paulo (state)) Bragantino	(Minas Gerais) Atlético Mineiro	(Brazil) Telê Santana	(Brazil) Paulinho McLaren (Santos)	15
37	1992	(Rio de Janeiro (state)) Flamengo (4)	(Rio de Janeiro (state)) Botafogo	(Rio de Janeiro (state)) Vasco da Gama	(Brazil) Carlinhos	(Brazil) Bebeto (Vasco)	18
38	1993	(São Paulo (state)) Palmeiras (7)	(Bahia) Vitória	(São Paulo (state)) Corinthians	(Brazil) Vanderlei Luxemburgo	(Brazil) Guga (Santos)	15
39	1994	(São Paulo (state)) Palmeiras (8)	(São Paulo (state)) Corinthians	(São Paulo (state)) Guarani	(Brazil) Vanderlei Luxemburgo	(Brazil) Amoroso (Guarani) (Brazil) Túlio (Botafogo)	19
40	1995	(Rio de Janeiro (state)) Botafogo (2)	(São Paulo (state)) Santos	(Minas Gerais) Cruzeiro	(Brazil) Paulo Autuori	(Brazil) Túlio (Botafogo)	23
41	1996	(Rio Grande do Sul) Grêmio (2)	(São Paulo (state)) Portuguesa	(Minas Gerais) Atlético Mineiro	(Brazil) Luiz Felipe Scolari	(Brazil) Paulo Nunes (Grêmio) (Brazil) Renaldo (Atlético Mineiro)	16
42	1997	(Rio de Janeiro (state)) Vasco da Gama (3)	(São Paulo (state)) Palmeiras	(Rio Grande do Sul) Internacional	(Brazil) Antônio Lopes	(Brazil) Edmundo (Vasco)	29
43	1998	(São Paulo (state)) Corinthians (2)	(Minas Gerais) Cruzeiro	(São Paulo (state)) Santos	(Brazil) Vanderlei Luxemburgo	(Brazil) Viola (Santos)	21
44	1999	(São Paulo (state)) Corinthians (3)	(Minas Gerais) Atlético Mineiro	(Bahia) Vitória	(Brazil) Oswaldo de Oliveira	(Brazil) Guilherme (Atlético Mineiro)	28
Copa João Havelange (2000)
45	2000	(Rio de Janeiro (state)) Vasco da Gama (4)	(São Paulo (state)) São Caetano	(Minas Gerais) Cruzeiro	(Brazil) Joel Santana	(Brazil) Adhemar (São Caetano)	22
Campeonato Brasileiro Série A (2001–present)
46	2001	(Paraná (state)) Atlético Paranaense (1)	(São Paulo (state)) São Caetano	(Rio de Janeiro (state)) Fluminense	(Brazil) Geninho	(Brazil) Romário (Vasco da Gama)	21
47	2002	(São Paulo (state)) Santos (7)	(São Paulo (state)) Corinthians	(Rio Grande do Sul) Grêmio	(Brazil) Émerson Leão	(Brazil) Luís Fabiano (São Paulo) (Brazil) Rodrigo Fabri (Grêmio)	19
48	2003	(Minas Gerais) Cruzeiro (2)	(São Paulo (state)) Santos	(São Paulo (state)) São Paulo	(Brazil) Vanderlei Luxemburgo	(Brazil) Dimba (Goiás)	31
49	2004	(São Paulo (state)) Santos (8)	(Paraná (state)) Atlético Paranaense	(São Paulo (state)) São Paulo	(Brazil) Vanderlei Luxemburgo	(Brazil) Washington (Atlético Paranaense)	34
50	2005	(São Paulo (state)) Corinthians (4)	(Rio Grande do Sul) Internacional	Goiás	(Brazil) Antônio Lopes	(Brazil) Romário (Vasco)	22
51	2006	(São Paulo (state)) São Paulo (4)	(Rio Grande do Sul) Internacional	(Rio Grande do Sul) Grêmio	(Brazil) Muricy Ramalho	(Brazil) Souza (Goiás)	17
52	2007	(São Paulo (state)) São Paulo (5)	(São Paulo (state)) Santos	(Rio de Janeiro (state)) Flamengo	(Brazil) Muricy Ramalho	(Brazil) Josiel (Paraná)	20
53	2008	(São Paulo (state)) São Paulo (6)	(Rio Grande do Sul) Grêmio	(Minas Gerais) Cruzeiro	(Brazil) Muricy Ramalho	(Brazil) Keirrison (Coritiba) (Brazil) Kléber Pereira (Santos) (Brazil) Washington (Fluminense)	21
54	2009	(Rio de Janeiro (state)) Flamengo (5)	(Rio Grande do Sul) Internacional	(São Paulo (state)) São Paulo	(Brazil) Andrade	(Brazil) Adriano (Flamengo) (Brazil) Diego Tardelli (Atlético Mineiro)	19
55	2010	(Rio de Janeiro (state)) Fluminense (3)	(Minas Gerais) Cruzeiro	(São Paulo (state)) Corinthians	(Brazil) Muricy Ramalho	(Brazil) Jonas (Grêmio)	23
56	2011	(São Paulo (state)) Corinthians (5)	(Rio de Janeiro (state)) Vasco da Gama	(Rio de Janeiro (state)) Fluminense	(Brazil) Tite	(Brazil) Borges (Santos)	23
57	2012	(Rio de Janeiro (state)) Fluminense (4)	(Minas Gerais) Atlético Mineiro	(Rio Grande do Sul) Grêmio	(Brazil) Abel Braga	(Brazil) Fred (Fluminense)	20
58	2013	(Minas Gerais) Cruzeiro (3)	(Rio Grande do Sul) Grêmio	(Paraná (state)) Atlético Paranaense	(Brazil) Marcelo Oliveira	(Brazil) Éderson (Atlético Paranaense)	21
59	2014	(Minas Gerais) Cruzeiro (4)	(São Paulo (state)) São Paulo	(Rio Grande do Sul) Internacional	(Brazil) Marcelo Oliveira	(Brazil) Fred (Fluminense)	18
60	2015	(São Paulo (state)) Corinthians (6)	(Minas Gerais) Atlético Mineiro	(Rio Grande do Sul) Grêmio	(Brazil) Tite	(Brazil) Ricardo Oliveira (Santos)	20
61	2016	(São Paulo (state)) Palmeiras (9)	(São Paulo (state)) Santos	(Rio de Janeiro (state)) Flamengo	(Brazil) Cuca	(Brazil) William Pottker (Ponte Preta) (Brazil) Diego Souza (Sport Recife) (Brazil) Fred (Atlético Mineiro)	14
62	2017	(São Paulo (state)) Corinthians (7)	(São Paulo (state)) Palmeiras	(São Paulo (state)) Santos	(Brazil) Fábio Carille	(Brazil) Henrique Dourado (Fluminense) (Brazil) Jô (Corinthians)	18
63	2018	(São Paulo (state)) Palmeiras (10)	(Rio de Janeiro (state)) Flamengo	(Rio Grande do Sul) Internacional	(Brazil) Luiz Felipe Scolari	(Brazil) Gabriel Barbosa (Santos)	18
64	2019	(Rio de Janeiro (state)) Flamengo (6)	(São Paulo (state)) Santos	(São Paulo (state)) Palmeiras	(Portugal) Jorge Jesus	(Brazil) Gabriel Barbosa (Flamengo)	25
65	2020	(Rio de Janeiro (state)) Flamengo (7)	(Rio Grande do Sul) Internacional	(Minas Gerais) Atlético Mineiro	(Brazil) Rogério Ceni	(Brazil) Claudinho (Red Bull Bragantino) (Brazil) Luciano (São Paulo)	18
66	2021	(Minas Gerais) Atlético Mineiro (3)	(Rio de Janeiro (state)) Flamengo	(São Paulo (state)) Palmeiras	(Brazil) Cuca	(Brazil) Hulk (Atlético Mineiro)	19
67	2022	(São Paulo (state)) Palmeiras (11)	(Rio Grande do Sul) Internacional	(Rio de Janeiro (state)) Fluminense	(Portugal) Abel Ferreira	(Argentina) Germán Cano (Fluminense)	26
68	2023	(São Paulo (state)) Palmeiras (12)	(Rio Grande do Sul) Grêmio	(Minas Gerais) Atlético Mineiro	(Portugal) Abel Ferreira	(Brazil) Paulinho (Atlético Mineiro)	20
69	2024	(Rio de Janeiro (state)) Botafogo (3)	(São Paulo (state)) Palmeiras	(Rio de Janeiro (state)) Flamengo	(Portugal) Artur Jorge	(Brazil) Alerrandro (Vitória) (Brazil) Yuri Alberto (Corinthians)	15
70	2025	(Rio de Janeiro (state)) Flamengo (8)	(São Paulo (state)) Palmeiras	(Minas Gerais) Cruzeiro	(Brazil) Filipe Luís	(Brazil) Kaio Jorge (Cruzeiro)	21
71	2026	(Rio de Janeiro (state)) Flamengo (9)	(São Paulo (state)) Palmeiras		(Portugal) Leonardo Jardim		

== Performances ==
=== By club ===
Seventeen clubs are officially recognized to have been the Brazilian football champions. In bold those competing in Série A as of 2026 season.

Rank	Club	Titles	Runner-up	Years won	Years runner-up
1	(São Paulo (state)) **Palmeiras**	12	7	1960, 1967 (TB), 1967 (RGP), 1969, 1972, 1973, 1993, 1994, 2016, 2018, 2022, 2023	1970, 1978, 1997, 2017, 2024, 2025, 2026
2	(Rio de Janeiro (state)) **Flamengo**	9	3	1980, 1982, 1983, 1992, 2009, 2019, 2020, 2025, 2026	1964, 2018, 2021
3	(São Paulo (state)) **Santos**	8	8	1961, 1962, 1963, 1964, 1965, 1968 (RGP), 2002, 2004	1959, 1966, 1983, 1995, 2003, 2007, 2016, 2019
4	(São Paulo (state)) **Corinthians**	7	3	1990, 1998, 1999, 2005, 2011, 2015, 2017	1976, 1994, 2002
5	(São Paulo (state)) **São Paulo**	6	6	1977, 1986, 1991, 2006, 2007, 2008	1971, 1973, 1981, 1989, 1990, 2014
6	(Minas Gerais) **Cruzeiro**	4	5	1966, 2003, 2013, 2014	1969, 1974, 1975, 1998, 2010
6	(Rio de Janeiro (state)) **Vasco da Gama**	4	4	1974, 1989, 1997, 2000	1965, 1979, 1984, 2011
6	(Rio de Janeiro (state)) **Fluminense**	4	1	1970, 1984, 2010, 2012	1937
9	(Rio Grande do Sul) **Internacional**	3	8	1975, 1976, 1979	1967 (RGP), 1968 (RGP), 1988, 2005, 2006, 2009, 2020, 2022
9	(Minas Gerais) **Atlético Mineiro**	3	5	1937, 1971, 2021	1977, 1980, 1999, 2012, 2015
9	(Rio de Janeiro (state)) **Botafogo**	3	3	1968 (TB), 1995, 2024	1962, 1972, 1992
12	(Rio Grande do Sul) **Grêmio**	2	4	1981, 1996	1982, 2008, 2013, 2023
12	**Bahia**	2	2	1959, 1988	1961, 1963
14	(São Paulo (state)) Guarani	1	2	1978	1986, 1987
14	(Paraná (state)) **Athletico Paranaense**	1	1	2001	2004
14	(Paraná (state)) **Coritiba**	1	0	1985	—
14	(Pernambuco) Sport Recife	1	0	1987	—
—	(Ceará) Fortaleza	0	2	—	1960, 1968 (TB)
—	(São Paulo (state)) São Caetano	0	2	—	2000, 2001
—	(Pernambuco) Náutico	0	1	—	1967 (TB)
—	(Rio de Janeiro (state)) Bangu	0	1	—	1985
—	(São Paulo (state)) **RB Bragantino**	0	1	—	1991
—	(Bahia) **Vitória**	0	1	—	1993
—	(São Paulo (state)) Portuguesa	0	1	—	1996

Note: although some consider Flamengo as champion of the Brazilian Championship in 1987, Sport is officially the only champion of this competition.

=== By state ===
State	Won	Runner-up	Third place
São Paulo	34	30	15
Rio de Janeiro	20	12	15
Minas Gerais	7	10	15
Rio Grande do Sul	5	12	16
Bahia	2	3	1
Paraná	2	1	2
Pernambuco	1	1	2
Ceará	0	2	1
Espírito Santo	0	0	1
Mato Grosso do Sul	0	0	1
Goiás	0	0	1

== See also ==
- List of Brazilian women's football champions
- Triple Crown of Brazilian Football
