= 1987 São Paulo FC season =

São Paulo
1987 season
- Chairman: Carlos Miguel Aidar
- Manager: Pepe (until April 20); José Carlos Serrão (caretaker, until May 20); Cilinho
- Campeonato Brasileiro: Second stage
- Campeonato Paulista: Champions (15th title)
- Copa Libertadores: Group stage
- Top goalscorer: League: Müller (10); All: Müller (26)

The 1987 São Paulo FC season details the competitions entered, matches played and teams faced by the São Paulo Futebol Clube in the 1987 season, showing the result in each event. Both friendly and official events are included. São Paulo Futebol Clube is a professional football club based in São Paulo, Brazil. They play in the Campeonato Paulista, São Paulo's state league, and the Campeonato Brasileiro Série A or Brasileirão, Brazil's national league.

== Statistics ==
=== Scorers ===
Position	Nation	Playing position	Name	Campeonato Paulista	Copa Libertadores	Campeonato Brasileiro	Others	Total
1	(Brazil)	FW	Müller	12	4	10	0	26
2	(Brazil)	FW	Lê	14	1	1	0	16
3	(Brazil)	MF	Pita	7	1	2	5	15
4	(Brazil)	MF	Silas	6	0	4	0	10
5	(Brazil)	FW	Edivaldo	5	0	1	1	7
6	(Brazil)	MF	Neto	3	1	0	1	5
7	(Brazil)	FW	Edmílson	4	0	0	0	4
8	(Brazil)	DF	Oscar	2	0	0	1	3
=	(Brazil)	MF	Tangerina	2	1	0	0	3
=	(Brazil)	DF	Zé Teodoro	2	0	1	0	3
9	(Brazil)	MF	Bernardo	2	0	0	0	2
=	(Brazil)	FW	Careca	0	1	0	1	2
10	(Uruguay)	DF	Darío Pereyra	0	0	1	0	1
=	(Brazil)	DF	Fonseca	1	0	0	0	1
=	(Brazil)	MF	Raí	0	0	1	0	1
=	(Brazil)	DF	Wagner Basílio	1	0	0	0	1
			Total	61	9	21	9	100

=== Overall ===
Games played	68 (42 Campeonato Paulista, 6 Copa Libertadores, 15 Campeonato Brasileiro, 5 Friendly match)
Games won	27 (17 Campeonato Paulista, 1 Copa Libertadores, 7 Campeonato Brasileiro, 2 Friendly match)
Games drawn	25 (18 Campeonato Paulista, 2 Copa Libertadores, 3 Campeonato Brasileiro, 2 Friendly match)
Games lost	16 (7 Campeonato Paulista, 3 Copa Libertadores, 5 Campeonato Brasileiro, 1 Friendly match)
Goals scored	100
Goals conceded	74
Goal difference	+26
Best result	4–0 (H) v Ponte Preta - Campeonato Paulista - 1987.04.22; 4–0 (A) v Santo André - Campeonato Paulista - 1987.06.10
Worst result	1–3 (A) v Guarani - Copa Libertadores - 1987.03.27; 1–3 (A) v Cobreloa - Copa Libertadores - 1987.06.26
Top scorer	Müller (26)

Source: São Paulo FC

== Friendlies ==
March 16 International	Jamaica	0–2	(Brazil) São Paulo	Kingston
			Pita 25'; Neto 86'	Stadium: Independence Park; Attendance: 30,000; Referee: Albert Allman
Note: The Jamaica national team also featured players from Trinidad and Tobago, Netherlands Antilles and Antigua and Barbuda.

March 18 International	Watford (England)	1–1 (5–6 p)	(Brazil) São Paulo	Port of Spain, Trinidad and Tobago
	Falco		Edivaldo	Stadium: Hasely Crawford; Attendance: 22.000

May 30 International	Napoli (Italy)	2–2	(Brazil) São Paulo	Naples
	Carnevale 12'; Giordano 40'		Careca 24'; Edivaldo 78'	Stadium: San Paolo; Attendance: 15,596; Referee: Gianluca Paparesta

=== Miami Marlboro Cup ===
March 12 International	Millonarios (Colombia)	3–2	(Brazil) São Paulo	Miami
	Carabin 20'; Bobadilha 77', 79'		Oscar 23'; Pita 59'	Stadium: Orange Bowl; Attendance: 30,000

March 14 International	Deportivo Cali (Colombia)	1–2	(Brazil) São Paulo	Miami
	Bolanos 67'		Pita 8', 44'	Stadium: Orange Bowl

== Official competitions ==
=== Campeonato Paulista ===
==== First stage ====
Pos.	Team	Pts	G	W	D	L
4	Santos	25	19	8	9	2
5	Noroeste	22	19	9	4	6
6	São Paulo	21	19	6	9	4
7	São Bento	20	19	5	10	4
8	Santo André	19	19	6	7	6

===== Matches =====
March 22 First stage 1	São Paulo	2–1	Santo André	São Paulo
	Pita 51'; Oscar 68'		Agnaldo 1'	Stadium: Morumbi; Attendance: 4,166; Referee: Roberto Nunes Morgado

March 29 First stage 2	Mogi Mirim	2–2	São Paulo	Mogi Mirim
	Carlos Alberto Seixas 54', 69'		Lê 73', 78'	Stadium: Vail Chaves; Attendance: 10,070; Referee: Romualdo Arppi Filho

April 1 First stage 3	São Paulo	3–0	Internacional	São Paulo
	Pita 6'; Müller 16'; Lê 36'			Stadium: Morumbi; Attendance: 3,001; Referee: João Leopoldo Ayeta

April 5 First stage 4	São Paulo	2–2	Portuguesa	São Paulo
	Müller 36'; Wagner Basílio 79'		Cláudio Adão 37'; Toninho 46'	Stadium: Morumbi; Attendance: 4,019; Referee: Roberto Nunes Morgado

April 7 First stage 5	São Paulo	3–2	XV de Jaú	São Paulo
	Lê 5'; Pita 66'; Silas 86'		Adílson 19'; André 90'	Stadium: Morumbi; Attendance: 1,221; Referee: Dulcídio Wanderley Boschillia

April 12 First stage 6	São Paulo	1–1	Novorizontino	São Paulo
	Oscar 70'		Barbosa 23'	Stadium: Morumbi; Attendance: 4,569; Referee: Dárcio Pereira

April 15 First stage 7	Ferroviária	1–1	São Paulo	Araraquara
	Rubens Feijão 40'		Fonseca 47'	Stadium: Fonte Luminosa; Attendance: 7,963; Referee: Romualdo Arppi Filho

April 19 First stage 8	Santos	3–2	São Paulo	Santos
	Mendonça 3', 87'; Éder 70'		Edmílson 26'; Müller 35'	Stadium: Vila Belmiro; Attendance: 20,099; Referee: Dulcídio Wanderley Boschillia

April 22 First stage 9	São Paulo	4–0	Ponte Preta	São Paulo
	Müller 23'; Silas 33', 71'; Edmílson 54'			Stadium: Morumbi; Attendance: 4,221; Referee: Romualdo Arppi Filho

April 26 First stage 10	Botafogo	1–1	São Paulo	Ribeirão Preto
	Oscar 30' (o.g.)		Edivaldo 79'	Stadium: Santa Cruz; Attendance: 23,500; Referee: Dulcídio Wanderley Boschillia

April 29 First stage 11	XV de Piracicaba	0–2	São Paulo	Piracicaba
			Müller 35'; Edmílson 78'	Stadium: Barão da Serra Negra; Attendance: 9,461; Referee: Ilton José da Costa

May 2 First stage 12	Palmeiras	1–0	São Paulo	São Paulo
	Lino 43'			Stadium: Pacaembu; Attendance: 47,842; Referee: José de Assis Aragão

May 10 First stage 13	São Paulo	0–0	Corinthians	São Paulo
				Stadium: Morumbi; Attendance: 20,642; Referee: Dulcídio Wanderley Boschillia

May 13 First stage 14	América	1–2	São Paulo	São José do Rio Preto
	Claudinho 78'		Edivaldo 19'; Bernardo 34'	Stadium: Mário Alves de Mendonça; Attendance: 10,183; Referee: Joel Teixeira Caires

May 17 First stage 15	Guarani	0–0	São Paulo	Campinas
				Stadium: Brinco de Ouro; Attendance: 3,308; Referee: Ilton José da Costa

May 20 First stage 16	São Paulo	0–2	Bandeirante	São Paulo
			Zé Roberto 49'; Osni 72'	Stadium: Morumbi; Attendance: 1,242; Referee: Roberto Nunes Morgado

May 24 First stage 17	São Paulo	0–0	Juventus	São Paulo
				Stadium: Morumbi; Attendance: 2,593; Referee: Ulisses Tavares da Silva Filho

May 26 First stage 18	Noroeste	2–1	São Paulo	Bauru
	Rodinaldo 40', 87'		Edmílson 9'	Stadium: Alfredo de Castilho; Attendance: 12,788; Referee: Pedro Inácio Filho

May 28 First stage 19	São Paulo	0–0	São Bento	São Paulo
				Stadium: Morumbi; Attendance: 328; Referee: Joel Teixeira Caires

==== Second stage ====
Pos.	Team	Pts	G	W	D	L	
1	Corinthians	31	19	13	5	1	Qualified to semifinals
2	São Paulo FC	25	19	9	7	3	
3	Portuguesa	24	19	9	6	4	
4	Santos FC	23	19	8	7	4	
5	Guarani	22	19	6	10	3	

===== Matches =====
May 31 Second stage 1	São Paulo	0–0	Mogi Mirim	São Paulo
				Stadium: Morumbi; Attendance: 1,723; Referee: Antônio de Pádua Sales

June 6 Second stage 2	Juventus	2–0	São Paulo	São Paulo
	Raudinei 2'; Betinho 58'			Stadium: Rua Javari; Attendance: 6,474; Referee: José de Assis Aragão

June 10 Second stage 3	Santo André	0–4	São Paulo	Santo André
			Silas 22'; Pita 65', 87'; Bernardo 68'	Stadium: Bruno José Daniel; Attendance: 9,319; Referee: Ilton José da Costa

June 21 Second stage 4	São Bento	1–2	São Paulo	Sorocaba
	Mazinho 66'		Tangerina 63'; Lê 74'	Stadium: Wálter Ribeiro; Attendance: 5,584; Referee: Ilton José da Costa

June 24 Second stage 5	Portuguesa	0–0	São Paulo	São Paulo
				Stadium: Canindé; Attendance: 7,249; Referee: Roberto Nunes Morgado

June 28 Second stage 6	Bandeirante	0–1	São Paulo	Birigui
			Neto 59'	Stadium: Pedro Marin Berbel; Attendance: 10,080; Referee: Antônio de Paula e Silva

July 1 Second stage 7	São Paulo	1–1	América	São Paulo
	Neto 58'		Márcio Florêncio 61'	Stadium: Morumbi; Attendance: 2,654; Referee: José de Assis Aragão

July 5 Second stage 8	São Paulo	3–2	Botafogo	São Paulo
	Tangerina 9'; Lê 64'; Pita 86'		Peu 63'; Edu 88'	Stadium: Morumbi; Attendance: 5,692; Referee: Roberto Nunes Morgado

July 7 Second stage 9	Novorizontino	2–3	São Paulo	Novo Horizonte
	Barbosa 76'; Amado 85'		Müller 36'; Silas 45'; Lê 57'	Stadium: Jorge Ismael de Biasi; Attendance: 11,141; Referee: Dulcídio Wanderley Boschillia

July 12 Second stage 10	Ponte Preta	1–1	São Paulo	Campinas
	Jefferson 80'		Zé Teodoro 90'	Stadium: Moisés Lucarelli; Attendance: 7,843; Referee: Ulisses Tavares da Silva Filho

July 15 Second stage 11	São Paulo	2–2	Guarani	São Paulo
	Edivaldo 18'; Müller 53'		Evair 15'; João Paulo 57'	Stadium: Morumbi; Attendance: 6,745; Referee: Ilton José da Costa

July 19 Second stage 12	São Paulo	0–0	Palmeiras	São Paulo
				Stadium: Morumbi; Attendance: 32,608; Referee: Roberto Nunes Morgado

July 22 Second stage 13	São Paulo	4–1	XV de Piracicaba	São Paulo
	Lê 2', 63'; Müller 41'; Pita 54'		Serginho 88'	Stadium: Morumbi; Attendance: 4,783; Referee: Antônio de Paula e Silva

July 26 Second stage 14	XV de Jaú	2–0	São Paulo	Jaú
	Nilson 18'; Antônio Carlos 90'			Stadium: Zezinho Magalhães; Attendance: 4,269; Referee: José de Assis Aragão

July 29 Second stage 15	São Paulo	3–2	Noroeste	São Paulo
	Lê 3', 42'; Müller 39'		Rodinaldo 14'; Márcio Araújo 89'	Stadium: Morumbi; Attendance: 6,796; Referee: Roberto Nunes Morgado

August 2 Second stage 16	São Paulo	1–0	Santos	São Paulo
	Zé Teodoro 80'			Stadium: Morumbi; Attendance: 37,994; Referee: José de Assis Aragão

August 5 Second stage 17	São Paulo	2–0	Ferroviária	São Paulo
	Lê 31', 48'			Stadium: Morumbi; Attendance: 7,747; Referee: Antônio de Paula e Silva

August 9 Second stage 18	Corinthians	3–3	São Paulo	São Paulo
	Everton 33', 74'; Biro-Biro 66'		Silas 18'; Müller 20'; Edivaldo 53'	Stadium: Morumbi; Attendance: 96,352; Referee: Dulcídio Wanderley Boschillia

August 12 Second stage 19	Internacional	2–0	São Paulo	Limeira
	João Batista 44'; Gilberto Costa 81'			Stadium: José Levy Sobrinho; Attendance: 2,887; Referee: José Carlos Gomes do Nascimento

==== Final standings ====
Pos	Team	Pld	W	D	L	GF	GA	GD	Pts	Qualification or relegation
1	Santos	38	16	16	6	47	27	+20	48	Qualified due to best season record
2	Palmeiras	38	14	19	5	36	23	+13	47	Qualified as stage winners
3	São Paulo	38	15	16	7	56	40	+16	46	Qualified due to best season record
4	Corinthians	38	17	11	10	54	38	+16	45	Qualified as stage winners
5	Inter de Limeira	38	17	11	10	32	31	+1	45	

Updated to match(es) played on August 12, 1987. Source: RSSSF.com
Rules for classification: 1) points; 2) wins; 3) goal difference; 4) number of goals scored.

==== Semifinals ====
August 15 Semifinals	São Paulo	0–0	Palmeiras	São Paulo
				Stadium: Morumbi; Attendance: 59,925; Referee: José de Assis Aragão

August 23 Semifinals	Palmeiras	1–3	São Paulo	São Paulo
	Edu Manga 11'		Müller 1', 22'; Neto 80'	Stadium: Morumbi; Attendance: 89,531; Referee: Roberto Nunes Morgado

==== Finals ====
August 26 Finals	Corinthians	1–2	São Paulo	São Paulo
	João Paulo 53'		Edivaldo 30'; Lê 41'	Stadium: Morumbi; Attendance: 95,493; Referee: José de Assis Aragão

August 30 Finals	São Paulo	0–0	Corinthians	São Paulo
				Stadium: Morumbi; Attendance: 109,474; Referee: Dulcídio Wanderley Boschilla

==== Record ====
Final Position	Points	Matches	Wins	Draws	Losses	Goals For	Goals Away	Win%
1st	52	42	17	18	7	61	42	62%

=== Copa Libertadores ===
==== Group 3 ====
Time	Pts	J	V	E	D	GP	GC	SG	
(Chile) Cobreloa	8	6	3	2	1	8	4	4	Qualified to semifinals
(Chile) Colo-Colo	7	6	2	3	1	6	4	2	
(Brazil) Guarani	5	6	1	3	2	6	8	-2	
(Brazil) São Paulo	4	6	1	2	3	9	13	-4	

===== Matches =====
March 27 1	Guarani (Brazil)	3–1	(Brazil) São Paulo	Campinas
	Henágio 12', 83'; Carlinhos 84'		Müller 50'	Stadium: Brinco de Ouro; Attendance: 4,122; Referee: Arnaldo David Cezar Coelho

April 10 2	São Paulo (Brazil)	2–1	(Chile) Cobreloa	São Paulo
	Müller 41'; Lê 49'		Puebla 69'	Stadium: Morumbi; Attendance: 8,293; Referee: Juan Daniel Cardellino de San Vicente

May 8 3	São Paulo (Brazil)	1–2	(Chile) Colo-Colo	São Paulo
	Müller 31'		Gutiérrez 18'; Vera 48'	Stadium: Morumbi; Attendance: 7,637; Referee: Jesús Díaz Palácios

June 4 4	São Paulo (Brazil)	2–2	(Brazil) Guarani	São Paulo
	Müller 60'; Pita 65'		Evair 1'; João Paulo 73'	Stadium: Morumbi; Attendance: 5,973; Referee: Luís Carlos Félix

June 16 5	Cobreloa (Chile)	3–1	(Brazil) São Paulo	Calama
	Díaz 25'; Covarrubias 66'; Letelier 89'		Careca 47'	Stadium: Municipal; Attendance: 10,064; Referee: Ricardo C. Calabria

June 19 6	Colo-Colo (Chile)	2–2	(Brazil) São Paulo	Santiago
	Gutiérrez 39'; Vera 85'		Tangerina 43'; Neto 68'	Stadium: Nacional; Referee: Carlos Alfonso Espósito

==== Record ====
Final Position	Points	Matches	Wins	Draws	Losses	Goals For	Goals Away	Win%
17th	4	6	1	2	3	9	13	33%

=== Campeonato Brasileiro ===
==== Green module ====
Group B	Pts	J	V	E	D	GP	GC	SG	
Internacional	10	8	4	2	2	10	2	8	Qualified to semifinals
Fluminense	9	8	3	3	2	7	6	1	
Cruzeiro	8	8	1	6	1	4	5	-1	
Vasco da Gama	7	8	3	1	4	10	7	3	
Goiás	7	8	3	1	4	5	8	-3	
São Paulo	6	8	2	2	4	7	7	0	
Coritiba	6	8	2	2	4	6	10	-4	
Santos FC	6	8	1	4	3	3	9	-6	

===== Matches =====
September 13 1	Flamengo	0–2	São Paulo	Rio de Janeiro
			Müller 5', 18'	Stadium: Maracanã; Attendance: 25,630; Referee: Carlos Sergio Rosa Martins

September 20 2	Bahia	1–1	São Paulo	Salvador
	Bobô 37'		Zé Teodoro 19'	Stadium: Fonte Nova; Attendance: 42,501; Referee: Arnaldo David Cezar Coelho

September 23 3	São Paulo	3–0	Santa Cruz	São Paulo
	Müller 38', 62', 71'			Stadium: Pacaembu; Attendance: 11,927; Referee: Luís Carlos Félix

September 26 4	Palmeiras	2–1	São Paulo	São Paulo
	Edu Manga 24'; Gérson Caçapa 65'		Pita 30'	Stadium: Pacaembu; Attendance: 24,036; Referee: José Roberto Ramiz Wright

October 4 5	São Paulo	0–0	Corinthians	São Paulo
				Stadium: Morumbi; Attendance: 13,316; Referee: Carlos Sergio Rosa Martins

October 8 6	São Paulo	0–1	Atlético Mineiro	São Paulo
			Sérgio Araújo 52'	Stadium: Morumbi; Attendance: 17,797; Referee: Luís Carlos Félix

October 12 7	São Paulo	0–2	Botafogo	São Paulo
			Berg 36'; Maurício 60'	Stadium: Morumbi; Attendance: 8,978; Referee: Nei Andrade Nunesmaia

October 18 8	Grêmio	1–0	São Paulo	Porto Alegre
	Valdo 67'			Stadium: Olímpico; Attendance: 14,325; Referee: Wilson Carlos dos Santos

==== Second stage ====
Group B	Pts	J	V	E	D	GP	GC	SG	
Cruzeiro	12	7	5	2	0	12	1	11	Qualified to semifinals
São Paulo	11	7	5	1	1	14	5	9	
Fluminense	8	7	3	2	2	7	6	1	
Coritiba	6	7	2	2	3	9	12	-3	
Vasco da Gama	6	7	2	2	3	7	11	-4	
Santos FC	5	7	1	3	3	4	8	-4	
Internacional	4	7	1	2	4	2	8	-6	
Goiás	4	7	0	4	3	3	7	-4	

===== Matches =====
October 24 1	São Paulo	3–1	Santos	São Paulo
	Müller 23'; Silas 37'; Pita 61'		Davi 72'	Stadium: Morumbi; Attendance: 6,925; Referee: José Roberto Ramiz Wright

October 28 2	São Paulo	2–0	Goiás	São Paulo
	Silas 60'; Raí 82'			Stadium: Morumbi; Attendance: 7,689; Referee: Carlos Sergio Rosa Martins

October 31 3	Coritiba	3–2	São Paulo	Curitiba
	Edson Borges 4'; Tostão 23'; Luís Fernando 47'		Edivaldo 10'; Silas 88'	Stadium: Couto Pereira; Attendance: 11,121; Referee: José Roberto Ramiz Wright

November 7 4	São Paulo	2–0	Fluminense	São Paulo
	Darío Pereyra 27'; Lê 40'			Stadium: Morumbi; Attendance: 16,974; Referee: Carlos Sergio Rosa Martins

November 12 5	Cruzeiro	0–0	São Paulo	Belo Horizonte
				Stadium: Mineirão; Attendance: 87,873; Referee: Arnaldo David Cezar Coelho

November 15 6	Vasco da Gama	1–2	São Paulo	Rio de Janeiro
	Roberto Dinamite		Müller 73', 87'	Stadium: Maracanã; Attendance: 6,123; Referee: Carlos Sergio Rosa Martins

November 21 7	São Paulo	3–0	Internacional	São Paulo
	Müller 64', 83'; Silas 73'			Stadium: Morumbi; Attendance: 19,653; Referee: Arnaldo David Cezar Coelho

==== Final standings ====
Pos.	Team	Pts	G	W	D	L	GS	GA	GD	
4	Cruzeiro	21	17	6	9	2	16	7	9	Qualified to semifinals
5	Gremio	18	15	7	4	4	14	8	6	
6	Sao Paulo FC	17	15	7	3	5	21	12	9	
7	Fluminense	17	15	6	5	4	14	12	2	
8	Palmeiras	16	15	7	2	6	11	13	-2	

==== Record ====
Final Position	Points	Matches	Wins	Draws	Losses	Goals For	Goals Away	Win%
6th	17	15	7	3	5	21	12	56%
