= Copa União Green Module =

Copa União
- Season: 1987
- Champions: Flamengo
- Relegated: ~~Santos, Corinthians~~
- Matches: 126
- Goals: 223 (1.77 per match)
- Top goalscorer: Müller (São Paulo) – 10 goals
- Biggest home win: Atlético-MG 5–1 Santos (Sep 13); Internacional 4–0 Santa Cruz (Sep 13); Gremio 4–0 Cruzeiro (Oct 8)
- Biggest away win: Bahia 0–3 Vasco da Gama (Sep 13); Coritiba 0–3 Cruzeiro (Nov 7)
- Highest attendance: Flamengo 1–0 Atlético Mineiro (118,162)
- Average attendance: 20,877

The Green Module of the Copa União is the tournament referred to the organizing body of the Clube dos 13, which is not officially recognized by the CBF, but which had reunited the most important Brazilian football clubs in the 1987 season.

== Green Module (Taça João Havelange) ==
=== First round ===
The clubs in Group A play against clubs in Group B.

==== Group A ====
Pos	Team	Pld	W	D	L	GF	GA	GD	Pts	Qualification
1	(Minas Gerais) Atlético Mineiro	8	6	2	0	14	3	+11	14	Qualified to semifinals
2	(Rio Grande do Sul) Grêmio	8	5	2	1	8	1	+7	12	
3	(São Paulo (state)) Palmeiras	8	4	1	3	6	7	−1	9	
4	(Rio de Janeiro (state)) Botafogo	8	2	5	1	6	4	+2	9	
5	Bahia	8	3	1	4	6	10	−4	7	
6	(Rio de Janeiro (state)) Flamengo	8	2	3	3	6	8	−2	7	
7	(Pernambuco) Santa Cruz	8	1	4	3	4	10	−6	6	
8	(São Paulo (state)) Corinthians	8	1	3	4	4	9	−5	5	

Source: RSSSF
Rules for classification: 1) points; 2) wins; 3) goal difference; 4) goals for.

==== Group B ====
Pos	Team	Pld	W	D	L	GF	GA	GD	Pts	Qualification
1	(Rio Grande do Sul) Internacional	8	4	2	2	10	2	+8	10	Qualified to semifinals
2	(Rio de Janeiro (state)) Fluminense	8	3	3	2	7	6	+1	9	
3	(Minas Gerais) Cruzeiro	8	1	6	1	4	5	−1	8	
4	(Rio de Janeiro (state)) Vasco da Gama	8	3	1	4	10	7	+3	7	
5	Goiás	8	3	1	4	5	8	−3	7	
6	(São Paulo (state)) São Paulo	8	2	2	4	7	7	0	6	
7	(Paraná (state)) Coritiba	8	2	2	4	6	10	−4	6	
8	(São Paulo (state)) Santos	8	1	4	3	3	9	−6	6	

Source: RSSSF
Rules for classification: 1) points; 2) wins; 3) goal difference; 4) goals for.

=== Second round ===
The matches are played between the clubs inside their respectives groups.

==== Group A ====
Pos	Team	Pld	W	D	L	GF	GA	GD	Pts	Qualification
1	(Minas Gerais) Atlético Mineiro	7	4	3	0	7	2	+5	11	Extra point in semifinals
2	(Rio de Janeiro (state)) Flamengo	7	4	2	1	10	4	+6	10	Qualified to semifinals
3	(São Paulo (state)) Palmeiras	7	3	1	3	5	6	−1	7	
4	(Rio de Janeiro (state)) Botafogo	7	2	2	3	5	5	0	6	
5	(Rio Grande do Sul) Grêmio	7	2	2	3	6	7	−1	6	
6	Bahia	7	1	4	2	5	8	−3	6	
7	(Pernambuco) Santa Cruz	7	2	1	4	6	10	−4	5	
8	(São Paulo (state)) Corinthians	7	1	3	3	5	7	−2	5	

Source: RSSSF
Rules for classification: 1) points; 2) wins; 3) goal difference; 4) goals for.

Note: Since Atlético Mineiro had already won the first round, the second round runners-up, Flamengo, qualified for the semifinals. For winning both rounds, Atlético Mineiro earned an extra point in the semifinals.

==== Group B ====
Pos	Team	Pld	W	D	L	GF	GA	GD	Pts	Qualification
1	(Minas Gerais) Cruzeiro	7	5	2	0	12	1	+11	12	Qualified to semifinals
2	(São Paulo (state)) São Paulo	7	5	1	1	14	5	+9	11	
3	(Rio de Janeiro (state)) Fluminense	7	3	2	2	7	6	+1	8	
4	(Paraná (state)) Coritiba	7	2	2	3	9	12	−3	6	
5	(Rio de Janeiro (state)) Vasco da Gama	7	2	2	3	7	11	−4	6	
6	(São Paulo (state)) Santos	7	1	3	3	4	8	−4	5	
7	(Rio Grande do Sul) Internacional	7	1	2	4	2	8	−6	4	
8	Goiás	7	0	4	3	3	7	−4	4	

Source: RSSSF
Rules for classification: 1) points; 2) wins; 3) goal difference; 4) goals for.

=== Semifinals ===
Team 1	Agg.	Team 2	1st leg	2nd leg
Atlético Mineiro	2–4	Flamengo	0–1	2–3
Cruzeiro	0–1	Internacional	0–0	0–1 (a.e.t.)

=== Finals ===
6 December 1987

Internacional (Rio Grande do Sul)	1–1	(Rio de Janeiro (state)) Flamengo
Amarildo 76'		Bebeto 30'

Beira Rio, Porto Alegre
Attendance: 63,228
Referee: Ulisses Tavares da Silva

13 December 1987

Flamengo (Rio de Janeiro (state))	1–0	(Rio Grande do Sul) Internacional
Bebeto 16'

Maracanã, Rio de Janeiro
Attendance: 91,034
Referee: José de Assis Aragão

== Final standings ==
Pos	Team	Pld	W	D	L	GF	GA	GD	Pts	Qualification or relegation
1	(Rio de Janeiro (state)) Flamengo (C)	19	9	6	4	22	15	+7	24	Champions
2	(Rio Grande do Sul) Internacional	19	6	6	7	14	12	+2	18	Runners-up
3	(Minas Gerais) Atlético Mineiro	17	10	5	2	23	9	+14	25	Semifinalist
4	(Minas Gerais) Cruzeiro	17	6	9	2	16	7	+9	21	Semifinalist
5	(Rio Grande do Sul) Grêmio	15	7	4	4	14	8	+6	18	
6	(São Paulo (state)) São Paulo	15	7	3	5	21	12	+9	17	
7	(Rio de Janeiro (state)) Fluminense	15	6	5	4	14	12	+2	17	
8	(São Paulo (state)) Palmeiras	15	7	2	6	11	13	−2	16	
9	(Rio de Janeiro (state)) Botafogo	15	4	7	4	11	9	+2	15	
10	(Rio de Janeiro (state)) Vasco da Gama	15	5	3	7	17	18	−1	13	
11	Bahia	15	4	5	6	11	18	−7	13	
12	(Paraná (state)) Coritiba	15	4	4	7	15	22	−7	12	
13	Goiás	15	3	5	7	8	15	−7	11	Relegation play-offs
14	(Pernambuco) Santa Cruz	15	3	5	7	10	20	−10	11	Relegation play-offs
15	(São Paulo (state)) Santos (R)	15	2	7	6	7	17	−10	11	Relegation to 1988 Second Level
16	(São Paulo (state)) Corinthians (R)	15	2	6	7	9	16	−7	10	Relegation to 1988 Second Level

Source: RSSSF
Rules for classification: 1) points; 2) wins; 3) goal difference; 4) goals for.
(C) Champions; (R) Relegated

=== Relegation ===
According to the original regulation created by Clube dos 13, the 13th and 14th placed teams would play a relegation play-off, and the 15th and 16th placed teams were directly relegated to the 1988 Second Level. However, the Clube dos 13 and the Confederação Brasileira de Futebol, entered into conciliation for the organizing body of the 1988 Campeonato Brasileiro, again under the full responsibility of the CBF, turning the relegations of Green Module invalid.

== Top scorers ==
Rank	Player	Club	Goals
1	Müller	São Paulo	10
2	Amarildo	Internacional	7
2	Cláudio Adão	Cruzeiro	7
2	Cuca	Grêmio	7
2	Renato	Atlético Mineiro	7
2	Romário	Vasco da Gama	7

== See also ==
- 1987 Campeonato Brasileiro Série A
- Copa União Blue and White Modules
