= Copa União Blue and White Modules =

Copa União
- Season: 1987
- Champions: Americano (Blue Module); Operário-MS (White Module)
- Matches: 184
- Goals: 352 (1.91 per match)
- Top goalscorer: Manelão (Paysandu) – 6 goals
- Biggest home win: Uberândia 5–0 Ponte Preta

The dispute of Blue and White modules of Copa União correspond to the second level of Green and Yellow modules of the tournament. The blue module consisted of teams from the south of Brazil, while the white module brought together clubs from the north, northeast and center-west regions. Each of the modules had the participation of 24 clubs, totaling 48 in total.

== Blue Module ==
The tournament is also called Taça Heleno Nunes:

=== First stage ===
==== Group A ====
| Pos | Team | Pld | W | D | L | GF | GA | GD | Pts | Qualification |
|---|---|---|---|---|---|---|---|---|---|---|
| 1 | (Santa Catarina (state)) Chapecoense | 6 | 2 | 4 | 0 | 6 | 4 | +2 | 8 | Qualified to second stage |
| 2 | (Rio Grande do Sul) Santa Cruz | 6 | 2 | 4 | 0 | 5 | 3 | +2 | 8 | Qualified to second stage |
| 3 | (Paraná (state)) Pinheiros | 5 | 1 | 2 | 2 | 5 | 4 | +1 | 4 | |
| 4 | (Rio Grande do Sul) Esportivo | 5 | 0 | 2 | 3 | 3 | 8 | −5 | 2 | |

Source: RSSSF
Rules for classification: 1) points; 2) wins; 3) goal difference; 4) goals for.

Note: The match Esportivo vs. Pinheiros it was not played due to the early definition of the group.

==== Group B ====
| Pos | Team | Pld | W | D | L | GF | GA | GD | Pts | Qualification |
|---|---|---|---|---|---|---|---|---|---|---|
| 1 | (Rio Grande do Sul) Caxias | 6 | 3 | 1 | 2 | 6 | 4 | +2 | 7 | Qualified to second stage |
| 2 | (Rio Grande do Sul) Juventude | 6 | 2 | 3 | 1 | 6 | 4 | +2 | 7 | Qualified to second stage |
| 3 | (Santa Catarina (state)) Avaí | 6 | 2 | 3 | 1 | 4 | 3 | +1 | 7 | |
| 4 | (Paraná (state)) Londrina | 6 | 1 | 1 | 4 | 4 | 9 | −5 | 3 | |

Source: RSSSF
Rules for classification: 1) points; 2) wins; 3) goal difference; 4) goals for.

==== Group C ====
| Pos | Team | Pld | W | D | L | GF | GA | GD | Pts | Qualification |
|---|---|---|---|---|---|---|---|---|---|---|
| 1 | (São Paulo (state)) Juventus | 6 | 2 | 4 | 0 | 6 | 1 | +5 | 8 | Qualified to second stage |
| 2 | (Rio de Janeiro (state)) Americano | 6 | 2 | 3 | 1 | 3 | 2 | +1 | 7 | Qualified to second stage |
| 3 | (Espírito Santo) Desportiva | 6 | 1 | 3 | 2 | 5 | 4 | +1 | 5 | |
| 4 | (Espírito Santo) Estrela do Norte | 6 | 2 | 0 | 4 | 2 | 9 | −7 | 4 | |

Source: RSSSF
Rules for classification: 1) points; 2) wins; 3) goal difference; 4) goals for.

==== Group D ====
| Pos | Team | Pld | W | D | L | GF | GA | GD | Pts | Qualification |
|---|---|---|---|---|---|---|---|---|---|---|
| 1 | (Minas Gerais) Tupi | 6 | 4 | 0 | 2 | 9 | 3 | +6 | 8 | Qualified to second stage |
| 2 | (São Paulo (state)) Botafogo | 6 | 3 | 1 | 2 | 6 | 7 | −1 | 7 | Qualified to second stage |
| 3 | (Minas Gerais) América Mineiro | 6 | 2 | 1 | 3 | 4 | 6 | −2 | 5 | |
| 4 | (Rio de Janeiro (state)) Goytacaz | 6 | 2 | 0 | 4 | 5 | 8 | −3 | 4 | |

Source: RSSSF
Rules for classification: 1) points; 2) wins; 3) goal difference; 4) goals for.

==== Group E ====
| Pos | Team | Pld | W | D | L | GF | GA | GD | Pts | Qualification |
|---|---|---|---|---|---|---|---|---|---|---|
| 1 | (Minas Gerais) Uberlândia | 6 | 3 | 2 | 1 | 5 | 1 | +4 | 8 | Qualified to second stage |
| 2 | (Minas Gerais) Uberaba | 6 | 2 | 3 | 1 | 2 | 1 | +1 | 7 | Qualified to second stage |
| 3 | (São Paulo (state)) Santo André | 6 | 2 | 2 | 2 | 2 | 3 | −1 | 6 | |
| 4 | (Goiás) Itumbiara | 6 | 0 | 3 | 3 | 0 | 4 | −4 | 3 | |

Source: RSSSF
Rules for classification: 1) points; 2) wins; 3) goal difference; 4) goals for.

==== Group F ====
| Pos | Team | Pld | W | D | L | GF | GA | GD | Pts | Qualification |
|---|---|---|---|---|---|---|---|---|---|---|
| 1 | (São Paulo (state)) Ponte Preta | 6 | 4 | 2 | 0 | 12 | 3 | +9 | 10 | Qualified to second stage |
| 2 | (Mato Grosso do Sul) Corumbaense | 6 | 2 | 1 | 3 | 8 | 10 | −2 | 5 | Qualified to second stage |
| 3 | (Goiás) Anapolina | 6 | 1 | 3 | 2 | 3 | 5 | −2 | 5 | |
| 4 | (Federal District (Brazil)) Brasília | 6 | 1 | 2 | 3 | 5 | 10 | −5 | 4 | |

Source: RSSSF
Rules for classification: 1) points; 2) wins; 3) goal difference; 4) goals for.

=== Second stage ===
| Team 1 | Agg. | Team 2 | 1st leg | 2nd leg |
|---|---|---|---|---|
| Chapecoense | 2–3 | Juventude | 1–2 | 1–1 |
| Caxias | 2–1 | Santa Cruz (RS) | 1–1 | 1–0 |
| Juventus | 1–1 (4–5 p) | Botafogo (SP) | 0–1 | 1–0 (a.e.t.) |
| Tupi | 0–2 | Americano | 0–1 | 0–1 |
| Uberlândia | 5–2 | Corumbaense | 0–1 | 5–1 (a.e.t.) |
| Ponte Preta | 3–2 | Uberaba | 0–2 | 3–0 |

=== Third stage ===
| Team 1 | Agg. | Team 2 | 1st leg | 2nd leg |
|---|---|---|---|---|
| Juventude | 2–1 | Caxias | 1–0 | 1–1 |
| Botafogo (SP) | 2–3 | Americano | 1–3 | 1–0 |
| Uberlândia | 5–3 | Ponte Preta | 5–0 | 0–3 |

=== Final stage ===
| Pos | Team | Pld | W | D | L | GF | GA | GD | Pts |
|---|---|---|---|---|---|---|---|---|---|
| 1 | (Rio de Janeiro (state)) Americano (C) | 2 | 1 | 1 | 0 | 2 | 0 | +2 | 3 |
| 2 | (Minas Gerais) Uberlândia | 2 | 1 | 0 | 1 | 2 | 2 | 0 | 2 |
| 3 | (Rio Grande do Sul) Juventude | 2 | 0 | 1 | 1 | 0 | 2 | −2 | 1 |

Source: RSSSF
Rules for classification: 1) points; 2) wins; 3) goal difference; 4) goals for.
(C) Champions

| Home \ Away | AME | UEC | JUV |
|---|---|---|---|
| Americano | | 2–0 | |
| Uberlândia | | | 2–0 |
| Juventude | 0–0 | | |

Source: RSSSF
Legend: Blue = home team win; Yellow = draw; Red = away team win.

== White Module ==
The tournament is also called Taça Rubens Moreira

=== First stage ===
==== Group A ====
| Pos | Team | Pld | W | D | L | GF | GA | GD | Pts | Qualification |
|---|---|---|---|---|---|---|---|---|---|---|
| 1 | (Mato Grosso) Mixto | 6 | 3 | 3 | 0 | 5 | 2 | +3 | 9 | Qualified to second stage |
| 2 | (Mato Grosso do Sul) Operário (MS) | 6 | 4 | 0 | 2 | 9 | 4 | +5 | 8 | Qualified to second stage |
| 3 | (Mato Grosso) Operário (MT) | 5 | 1 | 2 | 2 | 4 | 4 | 0 | 4 | |
| 4 | (Federal District (Brazil)) Sobradinho | 5 | 0 | 1 | 4 | 0 | 8 | −8 | 1 | |

Source: RSSSF
Rules for classification: 1) points; 2) wins; 3) goal difference; 4) goals for.

Note: The match Sobradinho vs. Operário (MT) it was not played due to the early definition of the group.

==== Group B ====
| Pos | Team | Pld | W | D | L | GF | GA | GD | Pts | Qualification |
|---|---|---|---|---|---|---|---|---|---|---|
| 1 | (Bahia) Catuense | 6 | 5 | 0 | 1 | 11 | 3 | +8 | 10 | Qualified to second stage |
| 2 | (Paraíba) Auto Esporte | 6 | 3 | 1 | 2 | 8 | 7 | +1 | 7 | Qualified to second stage |
| 3 | (Alagoas) CRB | 6 | 2 | 1 | 3 | 6 | 10 | −4 | 5 | |
| 4 | (Pernambuco) Central | 6 | 1 | 0 | 5 | 6 | 11 | −5 | 2 | |

Source: RSSSF
Rules for classification: 1) points; 2) wins; 3) goal difference; 4) goals for.

==== Group C ====
| Pos | Team | Pld | W | D | L | GF | GA | GD | Pts | Qualification |
|---|---|---|---|---|---|---|---|---|---|---|
| 1 | (Paraíba) Botafogo | 6 | 3 | 1 | 2 | 8 | 9 | −1 | 7 | Qualified to second stage |
| 2 | (Rio Grande do Norte) América de Natal | 6 | 2 | 3 | 1 | 8 | 5 | +3 | 7 | Qualified to second stage |
| 3 | (Ceará) Fortaleza | 6 | 2 | 2 | 2 | 6 | 5 | +1 | 6 | |
| 4 | (Rio Grande do Norte) ABC | 6 | 1 | 2 | 3 | 7 | 10 | −3 | 4 | |

Source: RSSSF
Rules for classification: 1) points; 2) wins; 3) goal difference; 4) goals for.

==== Group D ====
| Pos | Team | Pld | W | D | L | GF | GA | GD | Pts | Qualification |
|---|---|---|---|---|---|---|---|---|---|---|
| 1 | (Ceará) Ferroviário | 6 | 3 | 1 | 2 | 7 | 5 | +2 | 7 | Qualified to second stage |
| 2 | (Maranhão) Sampaio Corrêa | 6 | 2 | 2 | 2 | 3 | 4 | −1 | 6 | Qualified to second stage |
| 3 | (Bahia) Serrano | 6 | 2 | 2 | 2 | 3 | 3 | 0 | 6 | |
| 4 | Maranhão | 6 | 2 | 1 | 3 | 6 | 7 | −1 | 5 | |

Source: RSSSF
Rules for classification: 1) points; 2) wins; 3) goal difference; 4) goals for.

==== Group E ====
| Pos | Team | Pld | W | D | L | GF | GA | GD | Pts | Qualification |
|---|---|---|---|---|---|---|---|---|---|---|
| 1 | (Maranhão) Moto Club | 6 | 3 | 2 | 1 | 8 | 5 | +3 | 8 | Qualified to second stage |
| 2 | Piauí | 6 | 2 | 3 | 1 | 4 | 3 | +1 | 7 | Qualified to second stage |
| 3 | (Maranhão) Imperatriz | 6 | 2 | 2 | 2 | 5 | 5 | 0 | 6 | |
| 4 | (Piauí) Ríver | 6 | 1 | 1 | 4 | 6 | 10 | −4 | 3 | |

Source: RSSSF
Rules for classification: 1) points; 2) wins; 3) goal difference; 4) goals for.

==== Group F ====
| Pos | Team | Pld | W | D | L | GF | GA | GD | Pts | Qualification |
|---|---|---|---|---|---|---|---|---|---|---|
| 1 | (Pará) Paysandu | 6 | 4 | 1 | 1 | 11 | 6 | +5 | 9 | Qualified to second stage |
| 2 | (Pará) Tuna Luso | 6 | 3 | 1 | 2 | 6 | 6 | 0 | 7 | Qualified to second stage |
| 3 | (Amazonas (Brazilian state)) Nacional | 6 | 2 | 1 | 3 | 6 | 9 | −3 | 5 | |
| 4 | (Amazonas (Brazilian state)) Rio Negro | 6 | 1 | 1 | 4 | 6 | 8 | −2 | 3 | |

Source: RSSSF
Rules for classification: 1) points; 2) wins; 3) goal difference; 4) goals for.

=== Second stage ===
| Team 1 | Agg. | Team 2 | 1st leg | 2nd leg |
|---|---|---|---|---|
| Mixto | 3–1 | Auto Esporte | 0–1 | 3–0 |
| Catuense | 2–4 | Operário (MS) | 0–2 | 2–2 |
| Botafogo (PB) | 1–1 (3–2 p) | Sampaio Corrêa | 1–1 | 0–0 (a.e.t.) |
| Ferroviário | 0–3 | América de Natal | 0–1 | 0–2 |
| Moto Club | 2–5 | Tuna Luso | 0–2 | 2–3 (a.e.t.) |
| Paysandu | 3–1 | Piauí | 1–1 | 2–0 |

=== Third stage ===
| Team 1 | Agg. | Team 2 | 1st leg | 2nd leg |
|---|---|---|---|---|
| Mixto | 2–4 | Operário (MS) | 0–2 | 2–2 |
| Botafogo (PB) | 2–1 | América de Natal | 0–1 | 2–0 |
| Tuna Luso | 2–3 | Paysandu | 2–2 | 0–1 |

=== Final stage ===
| Pos | Team | Pld | W | D | L | GF | GA | GD | Pts |
|---|---|---|---|---|---|---|---|---|---|
| 1 | (Mato Grosso do Sul) Operário (MS) (C) | 2 | 1 | 1 | 0 | 2 | 1 | +1 | 3 |
| 2 | (Pará) Paysandu | 2 | 1 | 0 | 1 | 3 | 2 | +1 | 2 |
| 3 | (Paraíba) Botafogo (PB) | 2 | 0 | 1 | 1 | 0 | 2 | −2 | 1 |

Source: RSSSF
Rules for classification: 1) points; 2) wins; 3) goal difference; 4) goals for.
(C) Champions

| Home \ Away | OPE | PAY | BOT |
|---|---|---|---|
| Operário (MS) | | 2–1 | |
| Paysandu | | | 2–0 |
| Botafogo (PB) | 0–0 | | |

Source: RSSSF
Legend: Blue = home team win; Yellow = draw; Red = away team win.
