= Controversy over the title of the 1987 Brazilian football champion =

The controversy over the title of the 1987 Brazilian football champion stems from differing interpretations regarding the winner of the Copa União, resulting from organizational issues during the competition. The Brazilian Football Confederation awards the title for that year to Sport, while Clube dos 13 recognizes Flamengo as the champion. Some Brazilian sports outlets, such as Revista Placar, consider both clubs as co-champions. In March 2018, the Supreme Federal Court issued a final ruling, rejecting Flamengo's appeal for the third time and confirming Sport as the champion.

== Historical context ==
In 1987, the Brazilian Football Confederation was experiencing a severe financial and institutional crisis. On July 7, its president publicly announced that the organization was unable to hold a national championship that year in the same format as the previous one. Efforts were being made to secure sponsorship, and in the event of failure, the Brazilian Football Confederation proposed an agreement with clubs to cover their own travel expenses or, failing that, to organize a regionalized competition similar to the Taça Brasil era.

In response, Brazil's thirteen leading clubs sought a more profitable championship and, fearing the worst, formed a new entity called Clube dos 13 to organize their own tournament. This competition was named Copa União, a title that ultimately became synonymous with the 1987 Brazilian Championship.

== The 1987 tournament ==
The conflict persisted primarily because of Flamengo. Despite a final ruling by the Federal Regional Court of Pernambuco declaring Sport the champion, Flamengo pursued legal action. They obtained an injunction preventing Caixa Econômica Federal from awarding the "Taça das Bolinhas" trophy to São Paulo, which had become a five-time champion in 2007. Flamengo claimed that the trophy had not been contested since 1992.

On February 21, 2011, the Brazilian Football Confederation officially recognized Flamengo's 1987 title, declaring that there were two official champions that year. However, on June 14 of the same year, following a court order from Pernambuco, the Brazilian Football Confederation reverted its position, once again recognizing Sport as the sole champion.

When reporting Flamengo's 2019 Brazilian Championship victory on its official website, the Brazilian Football Confederation listed "1987 (Copa União)" among Flamengo's titles, alongside their championships from 1983 and 1992.

== Judicial disputes and continued recognition ==
Three years later, on April 8, 2014, the Superior Court of Justice upheld the decision that Sport was the sole 1987 champion.

In 2015, the case reached the Supreme Federal Court. The case was assigned to Justice Marco Aurélio Mello, a known Flamengo supporter who did not recuse himself from the case.

That same year, the Brazilian Football Confederation "split" the title in its Official Guide, contradicting the Superior Court of Justice's ruling by listing both Flamengo and Sport as champions in the 12th page of its 2015 edition. This guide included all unified national champions. While the Brazilian Football Confederation officially recognized Sport as the 1987 champion, it argued that recognizing Flamengo as well would not contradict the limits of the judicial ruling. However, the Brazilian Football Confederation stated that it complied with the court's decision to recognize Sport as the sole champion out of legal obligation.

The Brazilian Football Confederation's official recognition of titles occurs through Presidential Resolutions, not through the Official Guide. The guide even includes a bibliography section citing external sources (including Wikipedia), which are not official Brazilian Football Confederation documents.

On March 4, 2016, the Supreme Federal Court rejected the division of the title and upheld Sport as the sole 1987 champion. Flamengo appealed this decision, and a new trial was scheduled for August 2016. However, it was postponed by Justice Luís Roberto Barroso, who stated he needed more time to review the case.

The trial finally took place on April 18, 2017. By a vote of 3-1, the Supreme Federal Court's First Panel rejected Flamengo's appeal and reaffirmed Sport as the sole 1987 champion. While Flamengo could still challenge this decision, the likelihood of reversal was considered virtually nil.

On December 5, 2017, the Supreme Federal Court reaffirmed its earlier ruling, and on March 16, 2018, the decision was finalized, leaving Flamengo with no further recourse.

== The 2021 debate ==
On February 25, 2021, after Flamengo's 2020 Brazilian Championship win, the Brazilian Football Confederation published an article on its official website celebrating the victory. At the end of the article, the Brazilian Football Confederation listed Flamengo's national titles, including the 1987 Copa União. This highlighted the Brazilian Football Confederation's ongoing recognition of the Copa União as part of the Brazilian Championship, despite the Supreme Federal Court's final ruling.

== See also ==
- BETING, Mauro. Ora, bolinhas! A história que não acaba de 1987
- HELAL, Ronaldo. O Campeão Brasileiro de 1987. Ludopédio, São Paulo, v. 97, n. 27, 2017
- Flamengo ou Sport? uma análise do campeonato brasileiro de futebol profissional de 1987 a partir do direito desportivo
- FERREIRA, Gabriel Ramos Faculdade de Ciências Jurídicas e Sociais, Centro Universitário de Brasília, Brasília, 2018
- NUNES, Guilherme. A Era do Autoritarismo Acabou? Redemocratização, Consenso Neoliberal e a Copa União de 1987. GMARX, ano 2 nº 03/2021
- RIBEIRO, Marcelo Fongaro; PÍPOLO, Pedro Augusto; FERREIRA, Vinícius Prando. Marketing Esportivo no espaço do Futebol: Uma análise comparativa da Copa União de 1987 com os moldes atuais.
- SILVA, Rafael Gustavo Frazão Fernandes da. Redemocratização e futebol: Copa União de 1987 e a sua memória
- SILVA, Rafael Gustavo Frazão Fernandes da. A Copa União de 1987 e a construção de sua memória
- SOUTO, Sérgio Montero. E 1987 Não Acabou-Penta Ou Hexa: Diferentes Memórias Sobre A Hegemonia No Futebol Brasileiro Quando O 'Mercado' Entra Em Campo
- Especial Copa União 1987: o Brasileiro que ainda não acabou. De Placa, 2017.
- Copa União. FLA TV, 2020.
