= Betão =

Betão is the Portuguese word for concrete. Betão may also refer to:

== People ==
- Betão (futsal player) (born 1978), born Adalberto Nunes da Silva, Brazilian futsal player
- Betão (footballer, born 1963), born Roberto Taylor dos Santos Moraes, Brazilian football right back
- Betão (footballer, born November 1983), born Ebert William Amâncio, Brazilian footballer
- Betão (footballer, born March 1983), born Everton da Silva Oliveira, Brazilian footballer

== Other ==
- Betão Ronca Ferro, 1970 Brazilian comendy film
