= Carlos Miguel Aidar =

Brazilian creative director and football chairman

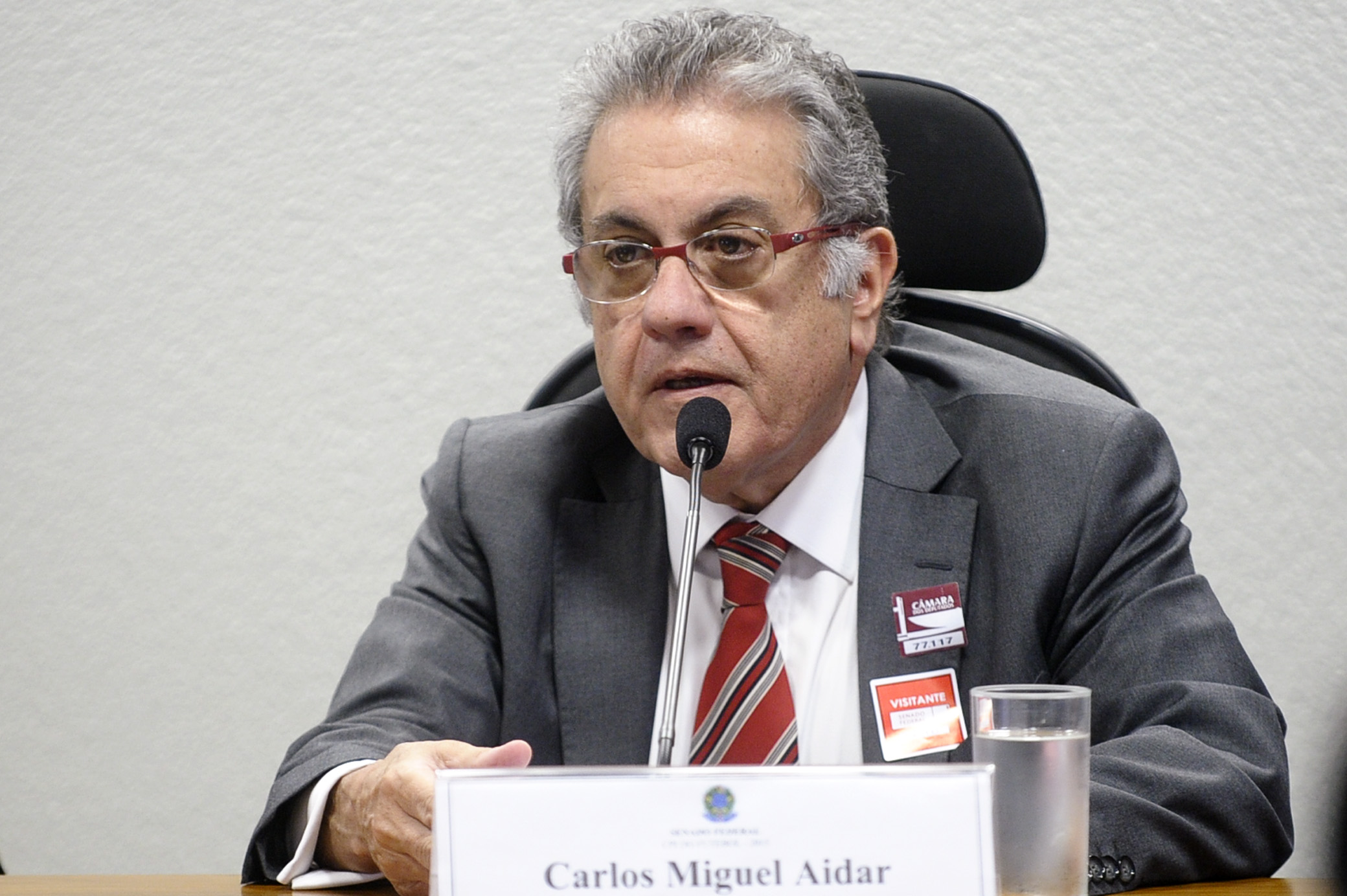
- Aidar in 2015
- Born: Carlos Miguel Castex Aidar; 25 August 1946 (age 79); São Paulo, Brazil
- Education: Mackenzie Presbyterian University
- Occupations: Lawyer; President of Order of Attorneys of Brazil – SP (2001–2003); President of São Paulo FC (1984–1988; 2014–2015)

Carlos Miguel Castex Aidar (born 25 August 1946), is a Brazilian lawyer, and former president of São Paulo FC.

== Personal life ==
Carlos Miguel is the son of Henri Couri Aidar, who was also president of São Paulo. He has Lebanese ancestry.

== Lawyer career ==
Aidar specialized in Civil Procedural Law from the Pontifical Catholic University of São Paulo. In the academic field, he worked as a professor of Sports Law at the Law School of the Mackenzie Presbyterian University and of Civil Procedural Law at the Law School of the Pontifical Catholic University of São Paulo. He published the book “Curso de Direito Desportivo” (Editora Ícone), coordinated other books in the area of Sports Law and has several articles and chapters published in several national and international works. In addition, he was a member of the Sports Legal Studies Commission (CEJD) at the Ministry of Sports, having authored the preliminary draft of the Pelé Law, and was a co-founder of the Brazilian Arbitration Association - ABAR.

In 2016, Aidar founded the law firm Aidar Advogados, having previously been a partner in the law firms Aidar SBZ Advogados, Felsberg, Pedretti, Mannrich e Aidar - Lawyers and Legal Consultants and Advocacia Aidar - Mariz. He is currently a member of the Brazilian Bar Association, São Paulo, Brasília and Rio de Janeiro chapters, and a member of the São Paulo Lawyers Association, the São Paulo Lawyers Institute, the International Lawyers Union and International Sports Law.

== Sports career ==
President of São Paulo FC from 1984 to 1988, Aidar was the creator, co-founder and president of Clube dos 13, an entity that brings together the biggest clubs in Brazilian football, which had as one of its main goals to organize the 1987 Copa União, which would represent the Brazilian Championship of that year. He was also known for being one of the biggest defenders of the Brazilian Champion title in favor of Flamengo, precisely because this club believed that it had actually won the 1987 Copa União. At 37 years of age, he was the youngest president of São Paulo.

He returned to the club's presidency in 2014, a period in which he accumulated controversies and disagreements, the most serious being the accusation of receiving an undue commission in the signing of player Iago Maidana. Aidar resigned from his position in 13 October 2015. In July 2022, he was acquitted of the charges.
