= 1987 Campeonato Brasileiro Série A =

Campeonato Brasileiro Série A
- Season: 1987
- Dates: 11 September 1987 – 7 February 1988
- Champions: Sport Recife (1st title)
- Copa Libertadores: Sport Recife; Guarani
- Matches: 239
- Goals: 433 (1.81 per match)
- Top goalscorer: 10 goals Müller (São Paulo)

The 1987 Campeonato Brasileiro Série A was the 31st edition of the Campeonato Brasileiro Série A, better known as Campeonato Brasileiro.

In 1987, the CBF was going through a serious financial crisis, and on 7 July 7, the CBF announced that it was unable to organize a national championship. The CBF attempted to find a sponsor to fund the competition, but was unsuccessful, so they were forced to hold a regional event. As a result, the thirteen main clubs in Brazil, (Clube dos 13) decided to create a new championship, with the name of Copa União, by which it was known, but had the official name of Copa Brasil.

The competition was divided by CBF in modules: the Green Module won by Flamengo and with Internacional runner-up; the Yellow Module, of which the champion was Sport and vice-champion Guarani. Champions and runners up of those two modules were to form the final quadrangular. The Blue and White modules formed the equivalent of the Série B.

Flamengo and Internacional, champions and runners-up of the Green Module, abdicated to participate from the final quadrangular as part of an agreement made by all clubs of the Green Module, forfeiting their berths in the final phase and having their scheduled matches ruled as W.O., which caused controversy and resulted in a topic of debate for many years as to who was the official champion of the 1987 season, since the winner of the quadrangular would have been the champion that season. In March 2018, Sport was officially declared as Brazilian champion of 1987, despite many appeals from Flamengo.

== Background ==
The origins of the championship date back to September 1986, when Vasco director Eurico Miranda suggested that the championship downsized between 16 and 20 clubs. The 1986 Campeonato Brasileiro was also unusual. The championship had 80 clubs, divided in four groups of eleven clubs (A, B, C, and D) and four groups of 9 clubs (E, F, G, and H). The six first-placed teams in the A, B, C and D groups were joined by the best four non-qualified teams, regardless of group, in those same groups, and the champions of groups E, F, G, and H in the second phase. In that year, it was also determined that the 1987 Campeonato Brasileiro would have 24 clubs, those being the six best teams in each of the four groups in the second phase. However, Vasco da Gama, after being eliminated in the first phase, attempted to get Joinville's berth in the second phase, since Joinville had won the points of a draw against Sergipe due to one player of Sergipe having been caught in an anti-doping test. If that extra point was taken from Joinville, Joinville would fall to 8th place in the group, and Vasco would qualify due to having a better goal difference. As an attempted solution, CBF gave berths in the second phase to both Vasco and Joinville, eliminating Portuguesa, that had appealed to the common courts in an unrelated case about ticket sales. After being threatened with the withdrawal of the clubs from São Paulo, CBF reversed its decision and enlarged the second stage to 36 clubs, qualifying Vasco da Gama, Náutico, Santa Cruz and Sobradinho. Because of that, the 1987 championship was enlarged to 28 clubs.

As of March 1987, the teams in the First Division would be the seven best-placed teams in each group in the Second stage of the 1986 championship: America-RJ, Atlético-GO, Atlético Mineiro, Atlético-PR, Bahia, Bangu, Ceará, Corinthians, Criciúma, CSA, Flamengo, Fluminense, Goiás, Grêmio, Guarani, Inter de Limeira, Internacional, Joinville, Náutico, Palmeiras, Portuguesa, Rio Branco, São Paulo, Santa Cruz, Santos, Treze Futebol Clube and Vasco da Gama. The other eight eliminated teams (Botafogo, Central, Comercial-MS, Nacional-AM, Ponte Preta, Sobradinho, Sport Recife and Vitória) plus Coritiba, Operário-MS and Remo, would join the other 21 best-placed teams in the 1987 State championships in the 1987 Second Division. Around the same time, Botafogo was still attempting to place itself in the First Level, taking Joinville's place.

In June 1987, STJD accepted Botafogo's request to be included in the 1987 championship, however, not confirming Joinville's relegation. Soon after this decision, other clubs such as Coritiba and Sobradinho requested their inclusion in the championship, with Coritiba's request being accepted as well.

In July, Octávio Pinto Guimarães, President of CBF, declared that the entity couldn't pay for the expenses of the clubs unless it found a sponsor, and thus, the clubs would have to pay for their expenses themselves. Otherwise, CBF would have to organize a regional championship to reduce the costs of the trips, to avoid not organizing the championship, since this would be an admission of incompetence.

On 11 July 1987, at Morumbi, the Clube dos 13 (Club of the Thirteen in Portuguese) was founded. The founding members were Corinthians, Palmeiras, São Paulo, Santos, Flamengo, Vasco da Gama, Fluminense, Botafogo, Atlético Mineiro, Cruzeiro, Internacional, Grêmio and Bahia, which according to a survey accounted for 95% of all fans of Brazilian football, and according to CBF ranking, were also the 13 clubs with the best records since 1971. The host of the event, Carlos Miguel Aidar, was also elected president of the new entity, remaining in office until April 1990. The objective of the Clube dos 13 was to organize the championship only between themselves. Thus, the Clube dos 13 organized the Copa União, which would represent the Brazilian Championship that year. The creation of the Copa União came after a reconciliation between the CBF and the Clube dos 13, since a break with the entity could trigger reactions in FIFA. In order to round out the number of participants, the Clube dos 13 invited Coritiba, Santa Cruz and Goiás, that had the best records in the Brazilian Championship and were the most popular teams in their respective states.

Aidar's proposal was that the championship would be played by Clube dos 13 clubs only. The remaining 19 clubs would play in a separate championship, from which three would leave to join Clube dos 13, forming Division A with 16 clubs. The other 16 clubs would form Division B.

On 15 July 1987 CBF vice president Nabi Chedid said that the CBF would organize the championship and that Clube dos 13 could be disqualified if they chose to make Copa Uniao and not play the CBF Brazilian championship. He also said that all 26 federations had to take part. That day, CBF presented their first proposal for the competition: 20 clubs in the first division, followed by twelve clubs from Clube dos Treze (except Bahia), and eight more that would come from a qualifier of 48 clubs.

To honor their policy commitments with other national federations in 1987, CBF would organize two championships that were nominated as modules: "Yellow" - considered by several media outlets the Second Division - which would consist of 14 teams that were left out of the Clube dos 13 tournament, along with Vitória and Sport, demoted in 1986. The modules "Blue" and "White" - considered by several media outlets to Third Division - which represent the Second Division. The modules "Blue" and "White" would serve as qualifiers to the Second Division in 1988.

To reconcile the interests of CBF with the Clube dos 13, Copa Uniao would be called "Green Module" and, in principle, these clubs called "Yellow Module" that fought a championship would be parallel to the Copa Uniao for the Club 13 (and for much of the sporting press, only the second division of Brasileirão that year), but in the end there should be a crossover between the champions and runners-up in both tournaments to decide who would be the two representatives of Brazil that would dispute the Copa Libertadores the following year. However, the formula of contention was not accepted by the clubs in Module Yellow, who wanted the Brazilian champion to also be defined in such a crossover. The president of the Football Federation of Pernambuco, Fred Oliveira, even declared that the teams in module yellow "will not take the field until CBF set the crossover module still in 1987". A preliminary version of the regulation was defined unilaterally on 9 September in a meeting with Club 13 at the Hotel Transamérica, in São Paulo. This regulation provided the only crossing between modules to define the Brazilian representatives in the 1988 Libertadores.

Although it seemed absurd, there was no reluctance about this proposal and everything was defined. But in late September, CBF began to consider also the "Module Yellow" as first division along with Copa União (called by CBF the "Green Module"). The change of regulation proposed by the CBF would be that this crossover between the champions and runners-up of these two divisions would also decide who was the Brazilian champion of 1987. However, there was no agreement and this led to a major controversy. There is also a regulation of Clube dos 13, not stamped by CBF, dated August 6 and another with the final regulation, officiated by CBF and disclosed only on the 1st of October (with the championship already underway) without the approval of the Clube dos 13 and clubs in Module Green, also stating that the champion would be decided in the cuadrangular, to be held in January 1988. This decision went against resolução 16/86 which required that the league championships began and ended the same year. It also said that there are exceptions only when notified by the federations, which would not have made the CBF to extend the 1987 Brazilian championship until January 1988.

Eurico Miranda, vice president of CR Vasco (at the time) would have given reason for confusion on behalf of the association by signing a document which provided the crossing when it was proposed by the CBF as an interlocutor in the 13 Club entity, however, the Clube dos 13 only heard the news via press release the following day. Still, there had never been an understanding between the two parties: the Club 13 and the other representatives of the clubs in contention for Copa Union never recognized or signed any document accepting the amendment of the regulation that was proposed by the confederation which required the participants crossing between the two modules. As well as the clubs Module Yellow, who even before the start of competition, always explicitly stood against no crossing of groups and later also demanded that the champion (and not just the Brazilian representatives in the 1988 Libertadores) was set in the cuandrangular. According to Eurico Miranda, a representative of the Clube dos 13 at the time, it has signed an agreement for the competition, and what was signed was in conjunction with the members of the Club of 13, according to what the CBF regulations were.

Ironically the regulation imposed by the CBF which provided a cross between the champions and vice champions of each module, however, would become unviable in the long run, because in the Yellow module it was not defined who was the vice champion. Finalists Sport and Guarani, after extra time in the shootout tied at 11-11, decided to share the title in an agreement between themselves. Not contrary to the rules or risk of punishment by the CBF, Guarani was willing to abdicate Yellow title module. According to a lower court decision in the 10th Federal Court of the Judicial Section of Pernambuco, CBF, possession of regulation and tiebreakers, said Sport were champion based on their better campaign. It was reported that on January 22, 1988, Guarani officially relinquished the title. The Union Cup of 87 organized by the Clube dos 13 had average paying audience of 20,877, the second largest in history of the national championship.

In December 1987, the CBF announced this cuandrangular, that would be played in round robin format, and on January 14, 1988, the 10th Federal Court Section Judicial Pernambuco upheld a lawsuit injunction filed by Sport to ensure the implementation of resolution 16/86 of the CND, which provided, in its Article 5, that any decision making in the Council of Arbitration, convened by Flamengo, would only be valid in case of unanimity. The following day, 29 of the 32 clubs of the modules Green and Yellow attended the Arbitration Council. At the council, Sport, Guarani, Nautico, Criciuma, Joinville, CSA and Treze voted for maintaining the crossing. However, only Sport, Guarani, Nautical, Fluminense and Vasco were in favor of the cuadrangular. Although there is no unanimity, the CND was against the crossing, contradicting the resolution of the entity itself. Claiming that the regulation was amended in the absence of Clube dos 13, Flamengo and International-RS with support of the 13 Club and Carlos Miguel Aidar, refused to dispute the crossing imposed by CBF. It was not a simple choice of Flamengo and Internacional, but the fulfillment of a determination of the 13 Club and the Union Cup regulation, which was created by the same entity. Thus, any of the clubs that reached the Grand Final should do the same. On January 29, 1988, CBF held a meeting in their own seat, with almost all the presidents of federations (only Fred de Oliveira-PE and Rubens Hoffmeister-RS did not attend) to examine the accounts of the CBF and try to establish a punishment for if Flamengo and International did not play the quadrangular. Under the protests of Flamengo fans, camped in front of the building of the CBF, it has received a vote of confidence of all present "because it demands respect for the Regulation of the Brazilian Championship ". On the same day, Flamengo filed an appeal in court asking not to be forced to play the intersection. The request was compiled by Judge Tanya de Melo Bastos of 1st Federal Court of Rio de Janeiro. The CBF then threatened to punish the carioca team for failing to contest the quadrangular (after the team was backed in court) but by joining the common law, as well as Sport.

With that Sport and Guarani competed in the quadrangular, winning games against Flamengo and International by WO. The CBF declared Sport as Brazilian champion of 1987, while the Club 13, the Arbitration Council and CND did the same with Flamengo. The CBF and Guarani proclaimed Sport and Guarani to represent Brazil in the Copa Libertadores. And the case was taken to the ordinary justice system, this, res judicata to the Sport Club do Recife. Ie senteça became permanent for the facts alleged and proven in court during the proceedings. But how is a figure of legal certainty and new facts before the adverse party can question the final decision.

However, both the CBF itself as FIFA can, if they so decide, take action against clubs who have recourse to ordinary courts. FIFA will not interfere judging or determining the titles of any club in any country that is, but it also does not consider that the ordinary courts are competent to hear a case and usually punish sports clubs that trigger the same. However, even with Flamengo's request to FIFA to intervene in the case and the punishment of Sport-PE, FIFA chose not to get involved in the case and not punish the Sport-PE. The following year, the CBF takes responsibility for organizing the Campeonato Brasileiro with leading clubs in the country who would be calling again for Copa União, thus keeping the same name of the competition which was held at Club 13. In 2000, again the Brazilian Championship was organized by the Clube dos 13, which was known as the Copa Joao Havelange.

== Court decisions ==
On 21 February 2011, CBF decided to resolve the controversy by declaring Flamengo and Sport as champions of 1987 and Guarani and Internacional as their runner ups, respectively. The reasoning for this decision was due to "new and convincing arguments" presented by Flamengo's legal department. Part of the press criticized the recognition, attributing it to CBF's interest in weakening the Clube dos 13, which was in the process of organizing a new bidding process for the sale of broadcasting rights of Brazilian Football. The Sport board swiftly declined this motion and went to court.

Since 1987, CBF has always insisted that both modules, Green and Yellow, were two halves of the same league. According to them, the decision made in 2011 to recognize Flamengo as co-champion of 1987 was made based on authoritative legal pronouncements that were identified, quoted, and transcribed by CBF in its Board Resolution which recognized Flamengo as 1987 Brazilian champion. CBF admitted that the goal was not to do "cold justice" to the historical facts "no matter who it hurt", but to pacify the controversy so nobody would be upset. Previously, Flamengo and Clube dos 13's argument for refusing to recognize both Modules was that the Yellow Module had served as a "second division" to the Green Module's first division.

In June 2011, CBF accepted the decision of the 10th Federal Court of First Instance of the Judiciary Section of Pernambuco, revoking the motion that considered Flamengo as champion, and recognizing Sport Clube do Recife as the sole 1987 Brasileirao champion. Despite the decision, CBF said that Flamengo could still appeal it if they desired and had convincing arguments. In November 2011, CBF rejected Flamengo's appeal again.

On 16 March 2018, a final decision was made, which declared that Sport Recife was the official champion of the 1987 Serie A, with Flamengo no longer able to make any appeals and officially resolving the case that had been going on for more than two decades.

== Copa União/Green Module (Taça João Havelange) ==
The CBF did not organize the Union Cup, that tournament was organized by the Club of 13 that had Regulation and cup itself. Green Module was only renamed after the FIFA Union decides to organize another championship and propose a modification of regulations providing for the intersection between the two competitions, which were being organized in parallel. The Regulation of Copa Union that was created by the Club of 13 was not on the division of the competition in two modules (or crossover between the two competitions). But the CBF and the clubs since the start of negotiating together for the event, even before the creation of the Club of 13, (which then also started to negotiate but only wanting the big clubs participating). Prior to that CBF had found problems with money, suggesting the clubs finance themselves or accomplish a lean championship, with regionalized, few trips. Finally, on 3 September 1987, CBF announced the agreement with the clubs, with the 1st division having 32 clubs (16 +16) and a crossover quadrangular. However, the next day the club of 13 made a proposal to the CBF, with regulation being done by the Clube dos 13, Brazilian champion and the module green, saying that there should be crossover between the modules, only for definition of the representatives in the Copa Libertadores. CBF, however, gave this proposal to the 16 clubs in Module Green to accept.

According to the Jornal do Brazil of 4 September 1987, the Federation proposed the way that the league would have 4 different champions. The CBF accepted, however, there was still some adjustments in the table and in the regulation, and there is a "political detail" on the square that would define the clubs in the Libertadores, would not be the "champion and vice champion". On the eve of the opening match, the clubs of module yellow still claimed that the intersection between modules for defining the representatives of Brazil in the Libertadores was maintained, according to the Jornal do Brazil, and requirements concerning the financial part of the event, and promised to go to court if they were not met. According to the newspaper O Estado de S. Paulo 4 September 1987, the agreement between CBF and clubs was that there would officially be 64 teams divided into 4 groups of 16, and then unofficially divided into 4 divisions. The 1st division, in which CBF insist on calling "green Module", will be the 13 teams that comprise the "Group of 13". The following day, the TV contract of the 13 Clubs was announced, saying that Module Green (16 clubs) matched would be transmitted on TV. However, there was a CND resolution that established a maximum quota of 20 clubs per division and prevent a league with 32 clubs in First Division. But at the beginning of the contest, with the resolutions 16,17, and 18 CND came into force as of the resolutions re-established, which became mandatory in the presence of the 28 official championship clubs in 1986.

== Copa Brasil/Yellow Module (Taça Roberto Gomes Pedrosa) ==
Also called Taça Roberto Gomes Pedrosa, it counted with the participation of the best-placed teams of the 1986 Championship that hadn't been invited into the Copa União, except for Ponte Preta. However, América refused to participate in the Yellow Module; all its matches were counted as 0–1 defeats. Ultimately, America FC of Rio was invited to the 1988 First Level, along with the seven best-placed teams of the Yellow Module. Clubs in Group A play clubs in Group B.

=== First round ===
==== Group A ====
Pos	Team	Pld	W	D	L	GF	GA	GD	Pts	Qualification
1	(Paraná (state)) Atlético Paranaense	7	3	3	1	8	5	+3	9	Qualified to Semifinals
2	(São Paulo (state)) Guarani	7	4	1	2	9	6	+3	9	
3	(Santa Catarina (state)) Criciúma	7	4	0	3	9	9	0	8	
4	(São Paulo (state)) Portuguesa	7	3	2	2	10	6	+4	8	
5	(Goiás) Atlético Goianiense	7	3	2	2	7	6	+1	8	
6	(São Paulo (state)) Inter de Limeira	7	3	1	3	5	7	−2	7	
7	(Espírito Santo) Rio Branco-ES	7	2	2	3	4	5	−1	6	
8	(Santa Catarina (state)) Joinville	7	1	2	4	6	10	−4	4	

Source: RSSSF

==== Group B ====
Pos	Team	Pld	W	D	L	GF	GA	GD	Pts	Qualification
1	(Pernambuco) Sport	8	5	3	0	13	2	+11	13	Qualified to Semifinals
2	(Bahia) Vitória	8	3	3	2	8	6	+2	9	
3	(Rio de Janeiro (state)) Bangu	8	3	2	3	5	5	0	8	
4	(Pernambuco) Náutico	8	3	0	5	8	13	−5	6	
5	(Paraíba) Treze	8	2	2	4	8	10	−2	6	
6	Ceará	8	2	2	4	5	7	−2	6	
7	(Alagoas) CSA	8	2	1	5	7	15	−8	5	

Source: RSSSF

=== Second round ===
==== Group A ====
Pos	Team	Pld	W	D	L	GF	GA	GD	Pts	Qualification
1	(São Paulo (state)) Guarani	7	4	2	1	9	3	+6	10	Qualified to Semifinals
2	(Santa Catarina (state)) Criciúma	7	3	3	1	8	3	+5	9	
3	(Paraná (state)) Atlético Paranaense	7	2	4	1	8	5	+3	8	
4	(São Paulo (state)) Portuguesa	7	3	1	3	3	4	−1	7	
5	(São Paulo (state)) Inter de Limeira	7	1	5	1	2	2	0	7	
6	(Espírito Santo) Rio Branco-ES	7	2	2	3	4	7	−3	6	
7	(Santa Catarina (state)) Joinville	7	1	3	3	2	6	−4	5	
8	(Goiás) Atlético Goianiense	7	1	2	4	1	7	−6	4	

Source: RSSSF

==== Group B ====
Pos	Team	Pld	W	D	L	GF	GA	GD	Pts	Qualification
1	(Pernambuco) Sport	6	4	1	1	6	4	+2	9	Extra point in Semifinals
2	(Rio de Janeiro (state)) Bangu	6	3	2	1	8	3	+5	8	Qualified to Semifinals
3	(Bahia) Vitória	6	2	4	0	7	4	+3	8	
4	(Paraíba) Treze	6	2	2	2	7	6	+1	6	
5	(Pernambuco) Náutico	6	1	2	3	5	9	−4	4	
6	Ceará	6	2	0	4	4	7	−3	4	
7	(Alagoas) CSA	6	0	3	3	2	6	−4	3	

Source: RSSSF

Note: Since Sport had already won the first round, the second round runners-up, Bangu, qualified for the semifinal. For winning both rounds, Sport earned an extra point in the semifinals.

=== Semifinals ===
Team 1	Agg.	Team 2	1st leg	2nd leg
Atlético Paranaense	0–1	Guarani	0–0	0–1 (a.e.t.)
Bangu	4–5	Sport	3–2	1–3

=== Finals ===
Team 1	Agg.	Team 2	1st leg	2nd leg
Guarani	2–3 (11–11 p)	Sport	2–0	0–3 (a.e.t.)

1. According to competition regulations, goal difference was not a tie-breaker criteria in the finals.
2. Both teams' chairmen (Homero Lacerda and Leonel Almeida), with the consent of the referee (Josenildo Santos Sousa) decided to end the penalty shootout when the count was at 11-11 and share the Yellow Module title. On 22 January 1988, Guarani withdrew from this statement and CBF declared Sport Recife as champions of Yellow Module.

== Final phase ==
Note: Sport Recife and Guarani, top-2 from the Yellow Module, entered the playoff with the Green Module (Copa União) top-2 ordered by CBF, but Flamengo and International-RS refused to play. Sport Recife and Guarani then played two games.

Date	Team 1	Result	Team 2	Notes
24 January 1988	Guarani	W.O.	Flamengo	[awarded 1-0]
24 January 1988	Sport	W.O.	Internacional	[awarded 1-0]
27 January 1988	Guarani	W.O.	Internacional	[awarded 1-0]
27 January 1988	Sport	W.O.	Flamengo	[awarded 1-0]
30 January 1988	Guarani	1–1	Sport	
7 February 1988	Sport	1–0	Guarani	

January 30, 1988 L1	Guarani	1–1	Sport	Campinas
	Catatau 62' (pen.)		Betão 52' (pen.)	Stadium: Estadio Brinco de Ouro; Attendance: 4,627; Referee: Carlos Elias Pimentel

February 7, 1988 L2	Sport	1–0	Guarani	Recife
	Marco Antonio 62'			Stadium: Ilha do Retiro; Attendance: 26,282; Referee: Luis Carlos Felix

Sport Recife beat Guarani 2–1 on aggregate and won the 1987 Campeonato Brasileiro. Both clubs qualified to the 1988 Libertadores

== Champion ==
1987 Campeonato Brasileiro
(Pernambuco)
Sport Recife
1st title

== Sources ==
- 1987 Campeonato Brasileiro Série A at RSSSF
- RSSSF Brasil
