= Maurício (footballer, born 1962) =

Brazilian footballer

Personal information
- Full name: Maurício de Oliveira Anastácio
- Date of birth: September 20, 1962 (age 64)
- Place of birth: Rio de Janeiro, Brazil
- Height: 1.84 m (6 ft 0 in)
- Position: Forward

Senior career*
Years	Team	Apps	(Gls)
1979–1981	Operário		
1981–1982	Rio do Sul (SC)		
1983–1984	Internacional		
1984–1986	América (RJ)		
1986–1987	Botafogo		
1988–1989	Internacional		
1989	Botafogo		
1990	Celta de Vigo		
1991	Grêmio		
1992	Portuguesa		
1992	Internacional		
1993–1994	Portuguesa		
1994–1995	Ulsan Hyundai	15	(2)
1996	Club America		
1997	Londrina		
1998	XV Piracicaba		

International career^{‡}
1991	Brazil	1	(0)
- * Club domestic league appearances and goals as of February 18, 2009 ‡ National team caps and goals as of February 18, 2009

Maurício de Oliveira Anastácio (born September 20, 1962, in Sorocaba), also known as Maurício, is a former Brazilian footballer who played as a forward.

Maurício is better known for his goal against Flamengo in the 1989 Campeonato Carioca final, ending a 21-year drought for Botafogo.

== Honours ==
- Campeonato Carioca in 1989 with Botafogo
- Campeonato Gaúcho in 1992 with Internacional
- Copa do Brasil in 1992 with Internacional
