= Sergio Díaz (footballer, born 1956) =

Argentine footballer (born 1962)

Personal information
- Full name: Sergio Carlos Díaz Lazarte
- Date of birth: 4 October 1962 (age 64)
- Place of birth: Buenos Aires, Argentina
- Height: 1.76 m (5 ft 9 in)
- Position: Attacking midfielder

Senior career*
Years	Team	Apps	(Gls)
1978–1983	Banfield		
1984	San Lorenzo		
1984–1986	Huachipato		
1987	Cobreloa		
1988	Independiente Medellín		
1989–1990	Colo-Colo		
1990–1991	Necaxa		
1992–1993	Deportivo Quito		
1994	Coquimbo Unido		
- * Club domestic league appearances and goals

Sergio Carlos Díaz Lazarte also known as Sergio Díaz (born 4 October 1962) is a former Argentine footballer who played as an attacking midfielder for clubs in Argentina, Chile, Colombia and Mexico.

== Career ==
Díaz was born in Buenos Aires, Argentina. He played, among others, for Independiente Medellín of Colombia as well as Huachipato, Cobreloa and Colo-Colo of Chile.

In Colo-Colo was instrumental in obtaining Chilean Primera División Championship 1989, playing 28 games, completing 2520 minutes, scoring 13 goals. also part of the squad Champion of Chilean Primera División Championship 1990, playing six games, 515 minutes scoring one goal.

== Honours ==
Colo-Colo

- Chilean Primera División Championship and Copa Chile: 1989, 1990
