= Tangerina =

Brazilian footballer

Personal information
- Full name: Raimundo Constâncio Neto
- Date of birth: 17 June 1960 (age 66)
- Place of birth: Sobral, Brazil
- Height: 1.63 m (5 ft 4 in)
- Position: Midfielder

Youth career
- Guarany de Sobral

Senior career*
Years	Team	Apps	(Gls)
1979–1983	Guarany de Sobral		
1983–1986	Fortaleza		
1986–1987	São Paulo	17	(3)
1988	Ceará		
1991–1992	Fortaleza		
1993	Moto Club		
1993	Flamengo-PI		
1994	Bacabal		
1995	Guarany de Sobral		
- * Club domestic league appearances and goals as of 28 November 2023

Raimundo Constâncio Neto (born 17 June 1960), better known as Tangerina, is a Brazilian former professional footballer who played as a midfielder.

== Career ==
A midfielder, he was revealed by Guarany de Sobral and was soon hired by Fortaleza, where he was a standout and top scorer in 1986. He was hired by São Paulo FC where he was part of the Brazilian champion squad in 1986 and the state championship in 1987. In 1988, in Ceará, He suffered a serious knee injury that sidelined him for three years. He returned in 1991 at Fortaleza and was two-time state champion in 1991 and 1992. He ended his career in 1994.

== Honours ==
São Paulo

- Campeonato Brasileiro: 1986
- Campeonato Paulista: 1987

Fortaleza

- Campeonato Cearense: 1983, 1985, 1991, 1992

Individual

- 1986 Campeonato Cearense top scorer: 17 goals
