= Betão (footballer, born 1963) =

Brazilian footballer

Personal information
- Full name: Roberto Taylor dos Santos Moraes
- Date of birth: 4 February 1963 (age 63)
- Place of birth: Pelotas, Brazil
- Position: Right back

Youth career
- Pelotas

Senior career*
Years	Team	Apps	(Gls)
1979–1980	Pelotas		
1980–1982	Internacional		
1982–1983	Sport Recife		
1983–1984	Santos		
1984	America-RJ		
1985–1989	Sport Recife		
1989–1990	Guarani		
1990–1991	Portuguesa		
1991	Santa Cruz		
1991–1992	Botafogo		
1992–1993	Sport Recife		
1994	XV de Jaú		
1995	Pelotas		
1996	Itumbiara		

International career
1981	Brazil U20		
1983	Brazil	2	(0)
- * Club domestic league appearances and goals as of 26 May 2024

Roberto Taylor dos Santos Moraes (born 4 February 1963), better known as Betão, is a Brazilian former professional footballer who played as a right back.

== Career ==
Born in Pelotas, Betão began his career at EC Pelotas, and later played for SC Internacional. In 1982 he had his first spell at Sport Recife, a team for which he became an idol and in 1987 when he won the Brazilian championship. He also had spells at Santos, Guarani, Portuguesa, and Botafogo, among other teams, until he ended his career in 1996 at Itumbiara EC.

== International career ==
Betão played for the Brazil under-20 team in 1981, being runner-up in South American Championship and champion of the Toulon Tournament. In 1983 he played two friendly matches with the main Brazil team, against Portugal and Wales.

== Personal life ==
After retiring, Betão worked in football schools and selling sports equipment.

== Honours ==
Internacional

- Campeonato Gaúcho: 1981

Sport Recife

- Campeonato Brasileiro: 1987
- Campeonato Pernambucano: 1982, 1988

Brazil U20

- Toulon Tournament: 1981
