= Copa União =

Copa União (Union Cup) was the official name given by the Clube dos 13 (Club Of The 13) organization to the Green Module of the 1987 Campeonato Brasileiro de Futebol.

The 1987 edition of Campeonato Brasileiro had two modules: Green (Copa União) and Yellow. The Green Module was won by Flamengo. The Yellow Module was won by Sport Recife. According to the championship rules, the winners and runner-ups of both modules should play a final four tournament. The winners would then decide the championship. However, Flamengo and Internacional, champion and runner-up of Copa União, respectively, refused to play the matches against Sport and Guarani, champion and runner-up of the Yellow Module and were disqualified. Due to the context of the tournament at the time, Clube dos 13 acknowledges Flamengo as the 1987 champion of Campeonato Brasileiro, and the club went to court intending to be recognized as champion, however in 2017 the Supreme Court decided, in a final decision, that the champion of the 1987 Campeonato Brasileiro was Sport Clube do Recife for having complied with the rules of the game and winning the final game with the runner-up in the yellow group. In 2019 the CBF published that Flamengo also deserves to be called the champion of 1987.

== Background ==
In 1987, the CBF announced it had no financial conditions to organize the Brazilian football championship, a mere few weeks before it was scheduled to begin. As a result, the thirteen most popular football clubs in Brazil created a league, dubbed the Club of the 13, to organize a championship of their own. This tournament was called Copa União and was run by the 16 clubs that eventually took part in it (Santa Cruz, Coritiba and Goiás were invited to join), completely free from CBF authority (a move not unlike the creation of club-administered leagues in Europe). The CBF initially stood by the Club of the 13 decision. However, weeks later, under pressure from football clubs excluded from the Copa União, the CBF adopted a new set of rules, which considered the Copa União part of a larger tournament, comprising other 16 teams, including Guarani, the runner up of 1986 Taça de Prata, and America-RJ, the forth placed from 1986, which were excluded from the selection of teams to participate in Copa União by the Club of the 13. It is also valid to highlight that Botafogo from Rio de Janeiro was relegated in 1986, yet because of its influence and considerable number of supporters was allowed to play in Copa União. CBF first “suggested” the new format in July, two months before the start of Copa União, and then declared in August that it would follow the new format independent of the Club of the 13 agreeing. Less than a month before the start of Copa União, CBF announced that the Club of the 13, represented by of Vasco da Gama vice-president Eurico Miranda, had agreed with the format made of two modules. According to that new set of rules, the Copa União would be dubbed the Green Module of the CBF championship, whereas the other 16 teams would play the Yellow Module. In the end, the first two teams of each Module would play each other to define the national champions and the two teams that would represent Brazil in the Copa Libertadores in 1988. However, that new set of rules was abandoned by the Club of the 13 latter, before the finals between the winners and runner ups of the two modules, and largely ignored by most of the Brazilian media, who concentrated their attention in the independent league, eventually won by Flamengo. CBF, however, acknowledges Sport, winner of the Yellow Module as that year's national champion because, under the CBF's ruling, there was to be a final four-way tournament bringing together the winner and runner-up of the Green and Yellow Modules. Due to Flamengo and Internacional's (runner-up of Copa União) refusal to take part, CBF decided to keep only the standings for the Yellow Module, thus qualifying Sport and runner-up Guarani as the Brazilian representatives for the Libertadores.

== The competition ==
The Copa União was a single round robin from which four teams would qualify for the semifinals. Clube dos 13 signed sponsoring contracts with Coca-Cola and Rede Globo, which guaranteed the clubs would be paid unprecedented rates for TV broadcasts.

CBF initially agreed to grant the 1987 national title to the Copa União winners. However it eventually backed off due to pressure from smaller clubs, mainly the ones that were excluded from the championship, including Guarani, the vice-champion in the previous year, and also due to the prospect of forever losing control of the national championship. CBF then announced, with Copa União already taking place, that the national championship would be decided in a run-off between the two best teams of the Copa União and the two best teams of a tournament congregating smaller teams (which the CBF dubbed the "Yellow Module"). The move was rejected Clube dos 13, which announced none of its members would take part in the play-off.

The Copa União was a huge success both in terms of stadium attendance and TV audience, and also for the quality of football that was displayed. Having barely qualified for the semifinals, Flamengo went on to eliminate favorite Atlético Mineiro with two historic wins, 1–0 at the Estádio do Maracanã and 3–2 at the Mineirão. In the final round, the Rio de Janeiro side became the champions after a 1–1 draw in Porto Alegre and a 1–0 victory at the Maracanã over Internacional.

Among Flamengo's starting eleven that year, only one player, Aílton, has never played for the Brazil national football team. The side consisted of such famous players as Zico, Bebeto, Jorginho, Zé Carlos (goalkeeper), Leandro, Edinho, Leonardo, Andrade, Zinho and Renato Gaúcho, who was elected the best player in the tournament.

Consistent with the Clube dos 13 decision, both Flamengo and Internacional refused to face Sport Recife and Guarani—who had agreed to share the Yellow Module title—in the final play-off CBF had convened. Since Flamengo and Internacional did not show up, the CBF championship finals consisted only of a rematch of the Yellow Module finals. In the first game, in Campinas, both teams tied 1–1. On February 7, 1988, Sport beat Guarani 1–0 and was declared the 1987 national champions by the CBF.

Clube dos 13 and the National Sports Council (CND), the entity legally in charge of settling the dispute at the time, before the 1988 Constitution, considered Flamengo to be the 1987 Brazilian Champions. CBF, however, declared Sport to be the national champions, and the club, along with Guarani, represented Brazil in the 1988 Copa Libertadores de América.

The core of the controversy lies on the fact that Copa União was perceived among Brazilian football fans, at the time, as the first division of the 1987 Campeonato Brasileiro, since it contained the best teams in the country playing against themselves, in such a manner that the highest level of Brazilian football was played in Copa União, even though three teams that reached the knockout stage of the previous edition of Campeonato Brasileiro were left out of Copa União, and were put on the Yellow Module of the competition: América-RJ, Portuguesa, and the 1986's edition runners-up Guarani. Although the 1987 is commonly considered to have been won by both Flamengo (as the Copa União champions) and Sport Recife, the Supreme Court recognizes Sport Recife as the sole 1987 Campeonato Brasileiro champions.

== Modules finals ==
First level
| Module | Champions | Finals | Runners-up |
|---|---|---|---|
| Green; Organized by Clube dos 13 | Flamengo | 1–1; 1–0; 2–1 | Internacional |
| Yellow; Organized by CBF | Sport Recife | 0–2; 3–0 (a.e.t.) (11–11 p) | Guarani |
Second level
| Module | Champions | Runners-up | Third place |
| Blue; Organized by CBF, South | Americano (RJ) | Uberlândia | Juventude |
| White; Organized by CBF, North | Operário (MS) | Paysandu | Botafogo (PB) |

Note: Sport and Guarani interrupted the penalty shootout after the count reached 11-11 and agreed to share the title. However, the CBF considered Sport champion.

=== Final stage ===
Flamengo won the Green Module and Sport Recife won the Yellow Module. But Flamengo and Internacional refused to play the final round and both teams was disqualified by CBF. In 2018, by the decision of Brazilian Supreme Court, Sport Recife was the rightful Champion at Campeonato Brasileiro 1987.

| Pos | Team | Pld | W | D | L | GF | GA | GD | Pts | Qualification |
|---|---|---|---|---|---|---|---|---|---|---|
| 1 | (Pernambuco) Sport Recife (C) | 6 | 5 | 1 | 0 | 6 | 1 | +5 | 11 | Qualified to 1988 Copa Libertadores |
| 2 | (São Paulo (state)) Guarani | 6 | 4 | 1 | 1 | 5 | 2 | +3 | 9 | Qualified to 1988 Copa Libertadores |
| 3 | (Rio de Janeiro (state)) Flamengo | 4 | 0 | 0 | 4 | 0 | 4 | −4 | 0 | Forfeit |
| 4 | (Rio Grande do Sul) Internacional | 4 | 0 | 0 | 4 | 0 | 4 | −4 | 0 | Forfeit |

Source: RSSSF
Rules for classification: 1) points; 2) wins; 3) goal difference; 4) goals for.
(C) Champions

== See also ==
- Clube dos 13
- CBF
- Campeonato Brasileiro Série A
