= 1987 in Brazilian football =

Football in Brazil
- Season: 1987

The following article presents a summary of the 1987 football (soccer) season in Brazil, which was the 86th season of competitive football in the country.

== Campeonato Brasileiro Yellow Module ==
The 1987 Campeonato Brasileiro Yellow Module was organized by the Brazilian Football Confederation, and did not count with the participation of the most traditional and most popular clubs, which were competing in the Copa União.

Semifinals

Team 1	Agg.	Team 2	1st leg	2nd leg
Atlético Paranaense	0-0	Guarani	0-0	0-0 (0-1 after extra time)
Bangu	4-5	Guarani	3-2	1-3

Final

December 6, 1987

Guarani	2–0	Sport

December 13, 1987

Sport	3–0 (0–0 after extra time, 11–11 pen)	Guarani

Both clubs decided to share the title, but Sport was declared as the Campeonato Brasileiro Yellow Module champions by aggregate score of 3-2, after Guarani withdrew the title on January 22, 1988.

== Copa União ==
The Copa União was organized by the Clube dos 13, but even counting with the most traditional and the most popular Brazilian clubs it is not officially recognized by the Brazilian Football Confederation.

Semifinals

Team 1	Agg.	Team 2	1st leg	2nd leg
Flamengo	4-2	Atlético Mineiro	1-0	3-2
Internacional	4-2	Cruzeiro	1-0	3-2 (1-0 after extra time)

Final

December 6, 1987

Internacional	1–1	Flamengo

Beira-Rio

December 13, 1987

Flamengo	1–0	Internacional

Maracanã

Flamengo declared as the Copa União champions by aggregate score of 2-1.

== National Championship Playoff ==
This playoff was organized by the Brazilian Football Confederation, and consisted of single matches between the champion and runner-up of the Yellow Module (Sport and Guarani) against the champion and runner-up of Copa União (Flamengo and Internacional). Flamengo and Internacional refused to play the competition. As Flamengo and Internacional refused, Sport and Guarani played against each other twice.

Home team	Score	Away team
Guarani	W.O. (Guarani awarded 1-0)	Flamengo
Sport	W.O. (Sport awarded 1-0)	Internacional
Guarani	W.O. (Guarani awarded 1-0)	Internacional
Sport	W.O. (Sport awarded 1-0)	Flamengo

January 30, 1988

Guarani	1–1	Sport

Brinco de Ouro

February 7, 1988

Sport	1–0	Guarani

Ilha do Retiro

Sport declared as the Campeonato Brasileiro champions by the Brazilian Football Confederation by aggregate score of 2-1..

== State championship champions ==
State	Champion	State	Champion
Acre	Atlético Acreano	Paraíba	Auto Esporte
Alagoas	CRB	Paraná	Pinheiros
Amapá	Amapá	Pernambuco	Santa Cruz
Amazonas	Rio Negro	Piauí	Flamengo-PI
Bahia	Bahia	Rio de Janeiro	Vasco
Ceará	Fortaleza	Rio Grande do Norte	América-RN
Distrito Federal	Brasília	Rio Grande do Sul	Grêmio
Espírito Santo	Guarapari	Rondônia	Ferroviário-RO
Goiás	Goiás	Roraima	Atlético Roraima
Maranhão	Sampaio Corrêa	Santa Catarina	Joinville
Mato Grosso	Operário (VG)	São Paulo	São Paulo
Mato Grosso do Sul	Comercial	Sergipe	Vasco-SE
Minas Gerais	Cruzeiro	Tocantins	-
Pará	Paysandu		

== Youth competition champions ==
Competition	Champion
Taça Belo Horizonte de Juniores	São Paulo

== Other competition champions ==
Competition	Champion
Campeonato Brasileiro de Seleções Estaduais	Rio de Janeiro
Taça Minas Gerais	América-MG
Torneio de Integração da Amazônia	Trem

== Brazilian clubs in international competitions ==
Team	Copa Libertadores 1987
Guarani	Group stage
São Paulo	Group stage

== Brazil national team ==
The following table lists all the games played by the Brazil national football team in official competitions and friendly matches during 1987.

Date	Opposition	Result	Score	Brazil scorers	Competition
May 19, 1987	England	D	1-1	Mirandinha	Rous Cup
May 23, 1987	Republic of Ireland	L	0-1	-	International Friendly
May 26, 1987	Scotland	W	2-0	Raí, Valdo	Rous Cup
May 28, 1987	Finland	W	3-2	Romário, Valdo, Müller	International Friendly
June 1, 1987	Israel	W	4-0	Romário (2), Dunga, João Paulo	International Friendly
June 21, 1987	Ecuador	W	4-1	Raí, Careca, Müller, Jorginho	International Friendly
June 24, 1987	Paraguay	W	1-0	Valdo	International Friendly
June 28, 1987	Venezuela	W	5-0	Edu Marangon, Morovic (own goal), Careca, Nelsinho, Romário	Copa América
July 3, 1987	Chile	L	0-4	-	Copa América
December 9, 1987	Chile	W	2-1	Valdo, Renato	International Friendly
December 12, 1987	West Germany	D	1-1	Batista	International Friendly

== Women's football ==
=== National team ===
The Brazil women's national football team did not play any matches in 1987.

=== Domestic competition champions ===
Competition	Champion
Campeonato Carioca	Radar
Taça Brasil	Radar
