= Clube dos 13 =

Brazilian football team organization

Clube dos 13 (Club of the 13) was the organization responsible for representing the interest of the most powerful football clubs of Brazil, including members from several football state federations such as Federação Paulista de Futebol, Federação de Futebol do Estado do Rio de Janeiro, Federação Gaúcha de Futebol, Federação Mineira de Futebol and Federação Bahiana de Futebol . The organization exists mainly to negotiate radio and television rights of competitions such as the Campeonato Brasileiro. Also Clube dos 13 is responsible for providing a unified voice in negotiations with CBF about the format of the Brazilian competitions.

It was founded on July 11, 1987, by representatives of the 13 most traditional clubs, hence the organization's name. As of 2007, the organization is now composed of 20 members.

Clube dos 13 organized two national competitions: 1987 Copa União and 2000 Copa João Havelange.

== Competitions ==
=== 1987 Copa União ===
The Clube dos 13 teams were dissatisfied with CBF, and so they organized their own championship independently of the CBF. Copa União was contested between sixteen teams: the thirteen founding members of Clube dos 13 and three invited teams (Coritiba, Goiás and Santa Cruz).

The first phase of Copa União was divided in two stages, and the teams were divided in two groups of eight teams (Group A and Group B). Both stages were played in a single round-robin format. In the first stage the teams from one group played against the teams of the other group. In the second stage, the teams played inside their own groups. The winners of the two groups from both stages qualified to the semifinal phase. The semi-finals and the finals were played in two legs.

The competition was not initially recognized by CBF, and the winners were not officially credited as national champions. CBF invited the winner and runner-up of Copa União, Flamengo and Internacional, respectively to play against CBF's competition winner and runner-up (Sport Recife and Guarani), but the proposal was refused. So, CBF did not recognize Flamengo and Internacional as champions and runners-up and neither did it invite them to play Copa Libertadores.

After unsuccessful attempts were made by Flamengo to obtain recognition in sport tribunals as national champion for the year 1987, a common justice civil suit was filed before the Brazilian Federal Judiciary, and this suit was judged in favor of Sport Recife, that thus obtained a judicial declaration that it was the 1987 National Champion.

Afterwards, CBF long held that it could not review the matter, either by removing the title from Sport Recife and awarding it to Flamengo, or even by splitting the 1987 title between the two clubs, by declaring both Flamengo and Sport as 1987 champions, because it was prevented from so doing by the result of the civil suit that declared Sport National Champions. This suit ended after all the possibilities of appeal were extinguished, and the decision in favor of Sport Recife became res judicata.

In 2011, however, amid internal CBF political disputes, Flamengo persuaded the presidency of CBF to take a different view. Flamengo now argued that the judicial decision in favor of Sport had a narrower scope: it directed that Sport Recife be recognized as the 1987 champions, but, according to this view now presented, it did not preclude CBF from also recognizing Flamengo as champions. Thus, Flamengo argued that CBF still could split the title between the two clubs if it wanted to. The CBF legal consultants agreed with this view, and the presidency of CBF then finally agreed to recognize both Flamengo and Sport as 1987 champions. Accordingly, on February 21, 2011, CBF issued a declaration recognizing Flamengo as 1987 national champions, along with Sport Recife. Sport Recife, however, took the matter to court once more: it argued before the Federal Court that had passed judgement in the 1980s that its ruling was now being breached by CBF.

Sport Recife managed to persuade the federal judge that the earlier judicial ruling declaring it as the 1987 champion prevented CBF from diminishing its title in any way, and that accordingly CBF could not recognize Flamengo or any other team as champions, or even joint champions. The federal judge thus issued an injunction, that is currently in force and that was upheld by the regional federal appeals court, declaring Sport as the sole 1987 National Champions, and ordering CBF to recant its February 21, 2011 declaration. CBF complied with the judicial order and, on June 14, 2011, it issued a new declaration, that revoked the February declaration that had recognized Flamengo as joint champions, and proclaimed the recognition of Sport Recife as sole 1987 National champions. CBF further declared that it was doing so only to comply with the judicial order, and that it still believed that its actions had not breached the earlier ruling.

=== 2000 Copa João Havelange ===
The 2000 Campeonato Brasileiro Série A was organized by the Clube dos 13, and CBF ratified it. The competition did not obey the promotion and relegation rules of 1999 Campeonato Brasileiro. The championship was created because Gama, in the 1999 championship contested and won in a common justice court and reverted its relegation. After Gama withdrew its protests in the common justice, the team was included in the championship.

The championship's first phase was divided in four modules (Blue, Yellow, Green and White), based on the popularity and tradition of the 114 participating teams. To the final phase, the 12 better placed teams of the Blue module, 3 from the Yellow module and 1 qualified from the Green and White playoffs played the round of 16. The next round was the Quarterfinals, them the semifinals and the finals, played by São Caetano and Vasco da Gama. The competition was won by Vasco da Gama.

The competition was named after former FIFA president João Havelange.

== Members ==
=== Founding members ===
Club	State
Atlético Mineiro	Minas Gerais
Bahia	Bahia
Botafogo	Rio de Janeiro
Corinthians	São Paulo
Cruzeiro	Minas Gerais
Flamengo	Rio de Janeiro
Fluminense	Rio de Janeiro
Grêmio	Rio Grande do Sul
Internacional	Rio Grande do Sul
Palmeiras	São Paulo
Santos	São Paulo
São Paulo	São Paulo
Vasco da Gama	Rio de Janeiro

=== New members ===
Club	State
Atletico Paranaense	Paraná
Coritiba	Paraná
Goiás	Goiás
Guarani	São Paulo
Portuguesa	São Paulo
Sport Recife	Pernambuco
Vitória	Bahia

== Break-up ==
On February 23, 2011, Botafogo, Flamengo, Fluminense and Vasco da Gama announced that they would no longer negotiate television rights through Clube dos 13. Meanwhile, Corinthians announced it left Clube dos 13. Both decisions were related to a disagreement regarding the television rights proposed by Clube dos 13. The five clubs will negotiate the television rights for the 2012–2014 seasons with no mediation by Clube dos 13.
