= 2015 Campeonato Brasileiro Série A =

Football season

Campeonato Brasileiro Série A
- Official logo.
- Season: 2015
- Champions: Corinthians; 6th Campeonato Brasileiro title
- Relegated: Avaí; Vasco da Gama; Goiás; Joinville
- Copa Libertadores: Corinthians; Atlético Mineiro; Grêmio; São Paulo; Palmeiras
- Matches: 380
- Goals: 897 (2.36 per match)
- Top goalscorer: Ricardo Oliveira (20 goals)
- Biggest home win: Internacional 6−0 Vasco (2 September)
- Biggest away win: Vasco 0−4 São Paulo (8 July)
- Highest scoring: Corinthians 4−3 Sport (12 August); Santos 5−2 Avaí (22 August); Corinthians 6−1 São Paulo (22 November)
- Longest winning run: 6 matches Atlético Mineiro; Flamengo
- Longest unbeaten run: 17 matches Corinthians
- Longest winless run: 10 matches Sport
- Longest losing run: 6 matches Vasco
- Highest attendance: 67,011; Flamengo 0−2 Coritiba (17 September)
- Lowest attendance: 1,461; Goiás 0−1 Avaí (7 June)
- Total attendance: 6,671,696
- Average attendance: 17,557
- All statistics correct as of 7 December 2015.

The 2015 Campeonato Brasileiro Série A (officially the Brasileirão Chevrolet 2015 for sponsorship reasons) was the 59th edition of the Campeonato Brasileiro Série A, the top-level of professional football in Brazil. After winning twice in a row in the 2013 and 2014 seasons, Cruzeiro came in defending their title as the Brazilian football champions. Corinthians won the title, their sixth overall and third since the introduction of the double round-robin in 2003.

== Format ==
Twenty teams competed in the league – for the thirteenth consecutive season, the tournament was played in a double round-robin system. The team with the highest number of points at the end of the season was declared champion. The bottom four teams were relegated and will play in the Campeonato Brasileiro Série B in the 2016 season.

=== International qualification ===
The Série A served as a qualifier to CONMEBOL's 2016 Copa Libertadores. The top-three teams in the standings qualified to the Second Stage of the competition, while the fourth place in the standings qualified to the First Stage.

== Teams ==
Despite Criciúma's relegation in the previous championship, it marked the first time four clubs from Santa Catarina took part of the same Brasileirão, at least in its current format; last time it happened, in 1979, the championship had more than 90 teams.

=== Stadia and locations ===
Location of teams in 2015 Série A

Team	Location	State	Stadium	Capacity
Atlético Mineiro	Belo Horizonte	Minas Gerais	Independência; Mineirão (5 matches); Mané Garrincha (one match)	23,018; 61,846; 72,788
Atlético Paranaense	Curitiba	Paraná	Arena da Baixada; Couto Pereira (one match)	42,372; 40,502
Avaí	Florianópolis	Santa Catarina	Ressacada	17,826
Chapecoense	Chapecó	Santa Catarina	Arena Condá	20,089
Corinthians	São Paulo	São Paulo	Arena Corinthians; Fonte Luminosa (one match)	47,605; 21,441
Coritiba	Curitiba	Paraná	Couto Pereira	40,502
Cruzeiro	Belo Horizonte	Minas Gerais	Mineirão; Arena Pantanal (one match)	61,846; 44,097
Figueirense	Florianópolis	Santa Catarina	Orlando Scarpelli	19,584
Flamengo	Rio de Janeiro	Rio de Janeiro	Maracanã; Mané Garrincha (2 matches); Arena das Dunas (one match)	78,838; 72,788; 31,375
Fluminense	Rio de Janeiro	Rio de Janeiro	Maracanã; Kléber Andrade (one match)	78,838; 21,252
Goiás	Goiânia	Goiás	Serra Dourada	41,574
Grêmio	Porto Alegre	Rio Grande do Sul	Arena do Grêmio	55,662
Internacional	Porto Alegre	Rio Grande do Sul	Beira-Rio	50,128
Joinville	Joinville	Santa Catarina	Arena Joinville	20,160
Palmeiras	São Paulo	São Paulo	Allianz Parque; Pacaembu (2 matches)	43,713; 37,730
Ponte Preta	Campinas	São Paulo	Moisés Lucarelli	19,728
Santos	Santos	São Paulo	Vila Belmiro	16,068
São Paulo	São Paulo	São Paulo	Morumbi	67,052
Sport	Recife	Pernambuco	Ilha do Retiro; Arena Pernambuco (7 matches)	32,983; 44,300
Vasco	Rio de Janeiro	Rio de Janeiro	Maracanã (8 matches); São Januário (8 matches); Mané Garrincha (one match); Olímpico Nilton Santos (one match); Arena Pantanal (one match)	78,838; 24,584; 72,788; 44,661; 44,097

=== Number of teams by state ===
Number of teams	State	Team(s)
5	São Paulo	Corinthians, Palmeiras, Ponte Preta, Santos, São Paulo
4	Santa Catarina	Avaí, Chapecoense, Figueirense, Joinville
3	Rio de Janeiro	Flamengo, Fluminense, Vasco
2	Minas Gerais	Atlético Mineiro, Cruzeiro
2	Paraná	Atlético Paranaense, Coritiba
2	Rio Grande do Sul	Grêmio, Internacional
1	Goiás	Goiás
1	Pernambuco	Sport

=== Personnel and kits ===
Team	President	Manager	Captain	Kit manufacturer	Shirt sponsors
Atlético Mineiro	Daniel Nepomuceno	(Brazil) Diogo Giacomini (interim)	(Brazil) Leonardo Silva	Puma	MRV
Atlético Paranaense	Mário Celso Petraglia	(Brazil) Cristóvão Borges	(Brazil) Wéverton	Umbro	Caixa
Avaí	Nilton Macedo Machado	(Brazil) Raul Cabral	(Brazil) Marquinhos	Fila	VVoa
Chapecoense	Sandro Pallaoro	(Brazil) Guto Ferreira	(Brazil) Rafael Lima	Umbro	Caixa
Corinthians	Roberto de Andrade	(Brazil) Tite	(Brazil) Ralf	Nike	Caixa
Coritiba	Rogério Bacellar	(Brazil) Pachequinho	(Brazil) Lúcio Flávio	Nike	Caixa
Cruzeiro	Gilvan Tavares	(Brazil) Mano Menezes	(Brazil) Fábio	Penalty	Supermercados BH/Caixa
Figueirense	Wilfredo Billinger	(Brazil) Hudson Coutinho	(Brazil) Marquinhos	Lupo	Caixa
Flamengo	Eduardo Bandeira de Mello	(Brazil) Jayme de Almeida	(Brazil) Wallace	Adidas	Caixa
Fluminense	Peter Siemsen	(Brazil) Eduardo Baptista	(Brazil) Fred	Adidas	Matte Viton
Goiás	Sérgio Rassi	(Brazil) Danny Sérgio	(Brazil) Renan	Kappa	None
Grêmio	Romildo Bolzan Jr.	(Brazil) Roger Machado	(Brazil) Maicon	Umbro	Banrisul
Internacional	Vitorio Píffero	(Brazil) Argel Fucks	(Argentina) Andrés D'Alessandro	Nike	Banrisul
Joinville	Nereu Martinelli	(Brazil) PC Gusmão	(Brazil) Marcelo Costa	Umbro	Salfer
Palmeiras	Paulo Nobre	(Brazil) Marcelo Oliveira	(Brazil) Zé Roberto	Adidas	Crefisa
Ponte Preta	Márcio Della Volpe	(Brazil) Felipe Moreira	(Brazil) Fernando Bob	Adidas	Hitachi/Viva Schin
Santos	Modesto Roma Júnior	(Brazil) Dorival Júnior	(Brazil) Ricardo Oliveira	Nike	None
São Paulo	Leco	(Brazil) Milton Cruz	(Brazil) Rogério Ceni	Penalty/Under Armour	None
Sport	João Humberto Martorelli	(Brazil) Paulo Roberto Falcão	(Brazil) Durval	Adidas	Caixa
Vasco	Eurico Miranda	(Brazil) Jorginho	(Brazil) Nenê	Umbro	Caixa

=== Managerial changes ===
Team	Outgoing manager	Manner of departure	Date of vacancy	Position in table	Incoming manager	Date of appointment
Grêmio	(Brazil) Luiz Felipe Scolari	Resigned	19 May	15th	(Brazil) Roger Machado	26 May
Fluminense	(Brazil) Ricardo Drubscky	Sacked	20 May	11th	(Brazil) Enderson Moreira	21 May
Flamengo	(Brazil) Vanderlei Luxemburgo	Sacked	25 May	17th	(Brazil) Cristóvão Borges	28 May
São Paulo	(Brazil) Milton Cruz	Mutual consent	31 May	6th	(Colombia) Juan Carlos Osorio	1 June
Cruzeiro	(Brazil) Marcelo Oliveira	Sacked	2 June	19th	(Brazil) Vanderlei Luxemburgo	2 June
Joinville	(Brazil) Hemerson Maria	Sacked	4 June	20th	(Brazil) Adílson Batista	5 June
Coritiba	(Brazil) Marquinhos Santos	Sacked	8 June	18th	(Brazil) Ney Franco	10 June
Palmeiras	(Brazil) Oswaldo de Oliveira	Sacked	9 June	15th	(Brazil) Marcelo Oliveira	15 June
Vasco	(Brazil) Doriva	Mutual consent	21 June	20th	(Brazil) Celso Roth	23 June
Goiás	(Brazil) Hélio dos Anjos	Sacked	22 June	15th	(Brazil) Julinho Camargo	7 July
Santos	(Brazil) Marcelo Fernandes	Mutual consent	9 July	17th	(Brazil) Dorival Júnior	9 July
Joinville	(Brazil) Adílson Batista	Sacked	26 July	20th	(Brazil) PC Gusmão	27 July
Ponte Preta	(Brazil) Guto Ferreira	Sacked	3 August	13th	(Brazil) Doriva	4 August
Internacional	(Uruguay) Diego Aguirre	Sacked	6 August	10th	(Brazil) Argel Fucks	13 August
Figueirense	(Brazil) Argel Fucks	Signed by Internacional	13 August	16th	(Brazil) René Simões	17 August
Vasco	(Brazil) Celso Roth	Sacked	15 August	20th	(Brazil) Jorginho	16 August
Flamengo	(Brazil) Cristóvão Borges	Mutual consent	20 August	13th	(Brazil) Oswaldo de Oliveira	20 August
Cruzeiro	(Brazil) Vanderlei Luxemburgo	Sacked	31 August	16th	(Brazil) Mano Menezes	1 September
Chapecoense	(Brazil) Vinícius Eutrópio	Sacked	14 September	13th	(Brazil) Guto Ferreira	14 September
Fluminense	(Brazil) Enderson Moreira	Sacked	16 September	11th	(Brazil) Eduardo Baptista	17 September
Figueirense	(Brazil) René Simões	Sacked	16 September	18th	(Brazil) Hudson Coutinho	22 September
Goiás	(Brazil) Julinho Camargo	Sacked	17 September	17th	(Brazil) Artur Neto	18 September
Sport	(Brazil) Eduardo Baptista	Signed by Fluminense	17 September	10th	(Brazil) Paulo Roberto Falcão	19 September
Atlético Paranaense	(Brazil) Milton Mendes	Sacked	28 September	11th	(Brazil) Cristóvão Borges	4 October
São Paulo	(Colombia) Juan Carlos Osorio	Signed by Mexico	7 October	5th	(Brazil) Doriva	7 October
Ponte Preta	(Brazil) Doriva	Signed by São Paulo	7 October	9th	(Brazil) Felipe Moreira	14 October
Goiás	(Brazil) Artur Neto	Resigned	18 October	18th	(Brazil) Danny Sérgio	19 October
Coritiba	(Brazil) Ney Franco	Sacked	8 November	18th	(Brazil) Pachequinho	9 November
São Paulo	(Brazil) Doriva	Sacked	9 November	5th	(Brazil) Milton Cruz	9 November
Atlético Mineiro	(Brazil) Levir Culpi	Mutual consent	26 November	2nd	(Brazil) Diogo Giacomini	26 November
Flamengo	(Brazil) Oswaldo de Oliveira	Mutual consent	28 November	11th	(Brazil) Jayme de Almeida	28 November

=== Foreign players ===
The clubs can have a maximum of five foreign players in their Campeonato Brasileiro squads.

Club	Player 1	Player 2	Player 3	Player 4	Player 5	Dual Nationality Players	Former Players
Atlético Mineiro	(Argentina) Jesús Dátolo	(Argentina) Lucas Pratto	(Colombia) Sherman Cárdenas				
Atlético Paranaense	(Argentina) Fernando Barrientos	(Chile) Christian Vilches	(Colombia) Daniel Hernández	(Portugal) Bruno Pereirinha			
Avaí	(Paraguay) Néstor Camacho					(Timor-Leste) Juninho	
Chapecoense							
Corinthians	(Paraguay) Ángel Romero	(Paraguay) Gustavo Viera					(Colombia) Stiven Mendoza (Peru) Paolo Guerrero (Qatar) Emerson Sheik
Coritiba	(Paraguay) Luis Cáceres						
Cruzeiro	(Argentina) Ariel Cabral	(Cameroon) Joel Tagueu	(Chile) Eugenio Mena	(Uruguay) Giorgian de Arrascaeta			(Chile) Felipe Seymour (Colombia) Duvier Riascos
Figueirense							
Flamengo	(Argentina) Héctor Canteros	(Colombia) Pablo Armero	(Peru) Paolo Guerrero			(Qatar) Emerson Sheik	(Argentina) Lucas Mugni (Croatia) Eduardo (Paraguay) Víctor Cáceres
Fluminense							(Argentina) Alejandro Martinuccio
Goiás							
Grêmio	(Ecuador) Frickson Erazo	(Uruguay) Braian Rodríguez	(Uruguay) Maxi Rodríguez				
Internacional	(Argentina) Andrés D'Alessandro	(Argentina) Lisandro López					(Argentina) Carlos Luque
Joinville	(Argentina) Mariano Trípodi						
Palmeiras	(Argentina) Agustín Allione	(Argentina) Jonatan Cristaldo	(Argentina) Pablo Mouche	(Paraguay) Lucas Barrios			(Chile) Jorge Valdivia
Ponte Preta							
Santos	(Colombia) Edwin Valencia	(Italy) Cristian Ledesma					
São Paulo	(Argentina) Ricardo Centurión	(Colombia) Wilder Guisao					
Sport Recife							
Vasco	(Argentina) Pablo Guiñazú	(Chile) Felipe Seymour	(Colombia) Duvier Riascos	(Paraguay) Julio dos Santos	(Uruguay) Martín Silva		(Argentina) Emanuel Biancucchi (Argentina) Germán Herrera

== Results ==
=== League table ===
Pos	Team	Pld	W	D	L	GF	GA	GD	Pts	Qualification or relegation
1	Corinthians (C)	38	24	9	5	71	31	+40	81	2016 Copa Libertadores second stage (Note: Palmeiras has a berth guaranteed to the second stage as the 2015 Copa do Brasil champions.)
2	Atlético Mineiro	38	21	6	11	65	47	+18	69	2016 Copa Libertadores second stage
3	Grêmio	38	20	8	10	52	32	+20	68	2016 Copa Libertadores second stage
4	São Paulo	38	18	8	12	53	47	+6	62	2016 Copa Libertadores first stage
5	Internacional	38	17	9	12	39	38	+1	60	2016 Copa do Brasil round of 16 (Note: Since a Brazilian team didn't win the 2015 Copa Libertadores, an additional berth to the 2016 Copa do Brasil round of 16 will be given to the best team not qualified to the 2016 Copa Libertadores, the fifth-placed Internacional.)
6	Sport Recife	38	15	14	9	53	38	+15	59	2016 Copa Sudamericana second stage (Note: Teams will enter in the 2016 Copa Sudamericana if they do not reach the 2016 Copa do Brasil round of 16. Also, the 2015 Copa Verde champion (Cuiabá) and the 2016 Copa do Nordeste champion have a guaranteed berth.)
7	Santos	38	16	10	12	59	41	+18	58	2016 Copa Sudamericana second stage
8	Cruzeiro	38	15	10	13	44	35	+9	55	2016 Copa Sudamericana second stage
9	Palmeiras	38	15	8	15	60	51	+9	53	2016 Copa Libertadores second stage
10	Atlético Paranaense	38	14	9	15	43	48	−5	51	2016 Copa Sudamericana second stage
11	Ponte Preta	38	13	12	13	41	40	+1	51	2016 Copa Sudamericana second stage
12	Flamengo	38	15	4	19	45	53	−8	49	2016 Copa Sudamericana second stage
13	Fluminense	38	14	5	19	40	49	−9	47	2016 Copa Sudamericana second stage
14	Chapecoense	38	12	11	15	34	44	−10	47	2016 Copa Sudamericana second stage
15	Coritiba	38	11	11	16	31	42	−11	44	2016 Copa Sudamericana second stage
16	Figueirense	38	11	10	17	36	50	−14	43	2016 Copa Sudamericana second stage
17	Avaí (R)	38	11	9	18	38	60	−22	42	Relegation to 2016 Campeonato Brasileiro Série B
18	Vasco da Gama (R)	38	10	11	17	28	54	−26	41	Relegation to 2016 Campeonato Brasileiro Série B
19	Goiás (R)	38	10	8	20	39	49	−10	38	Relegation to 2016 Campeonato Brasileiro Série B
20	Joinville (R)	38	7	10	21	26	48	−22	31	Relegation to 2016 Campeonato Brasileiro Série B

Source: Soccerway.com
Rules for classification: 1) points; 2) wins; 3) goal difference; 4) goals scored; 5) head-to-head results; 6) least red cards received; 7) least yellow cards received; 8) draw.
(C) Champions; (R) Relegated

=== Result table ===
Home \ Away	CAM	CAP	AVA	CHA	COR	CTB	CRU	FIG	FLA	FLU	GOI	GRE	INT	JOI	PAL	PON	SAN	SPA	SPT	VAS
Atlético Mineiro		0–1	2–0	3–0	0–3	2–0	1–3	1–0	4–1	4–1	2–2	0–2	2–1	1–0	2–1	2–1	2–2	3–1	2–1	3–0
Atlético Paranaense	1–0		2–1	1–0	1–4	2–2	2–2	1–0	3–0	1–2	3–0	1–2	3–0	0–0	3–3	1–2	0–0	2–1	1–1	2–0
Avaí	1–4	1–2		2–1	1–2	0–2	1–1	1–1	2–1	1–0	2–1	1–2	3–0	2–1	1–3	1–0	1–1	2–1	2–2	1–1
Chapecoense	2–1	0–0	0–0		1–3	2–1	0–2	2–2	1–3	2–1	1–3	1–0	1–0	2–0	5–1	0–0	1–0	0–1	1–1	1–0
Corinthians	1–0	2–0	1–1	1–0		2–1	3–0	2–1	1–0	2–0	3–0	1–1	2–1	3–0	0–2	2–0	2–0	6–1	4–3	3–0
Coritiba	0–3	2–0	1–2	1–0	1–1		1–0	1–1	0–1	1–1	1–1	2–0	0–1	0–0	2–1	0–0	1–0	1–2	0–0	0–0
Cruzeiro	1–1	2–0	1–1	0–1	0–1	2–0		5–1	1–0	2–0	1–0	0–0	0–0	3–0	2–1	1–1	0–1	2–1	3–0	2–2
Figueirense	0–1	1–1	0–1	0–0	1–3	0–0	2–1		3–0	1–0	3–1	0–2	0–0	0–2	2–1	3–1	0–0	0–2	2–1	0–0
Flamengo	0–2	3–2	3–0	1–0	0–3	0–2	2–0	1–2		2–3	4–1	1–0	0–1	2–0	1–2	1–1	2–2	2–1	2–2	1–2
Fluminense	1–2	0–1	3–1	2–3	0–0	2–0	1–0	2–1	1–3		2–0	1–0	1–1	1–0	1–4	2–0	2–1	2–0	0–0	1–2
Goiás	0–0	2–0	0–1	0–0	0–0	1–3	0–1	2–3	0–1	1–2		1–1	2–1	3–0	1–0	1–2	4–1	0–1	1–0	3–0
Grêmio	2–1	2–1	3–1	2–3	3–1	0–0	1–0	1–0	2–0	1–0	2–1		5–0	2–1	1–0	3–3	1–0	1–2	1–1	2–0
Internacional	1–3	2–0	1–0	0–0	2–1	2–0	2–0	1–1	1–2	1–0	2–1	1–0		1–0	1–0	1–0	1–0	0–0	2–1	6–0
Joinville	2–2	1–2	2–0	0–0	0–1	3–1	3–0	1–0	0–1	2–1	2–1	0–2	0–2		0–0	1–1	0–0	0–0	1–1	1–2
Palmeiras	2–2	0–1	3–0	2–0	3–3	0–2	1–1	2–0	4–2	2–1	0–1	3–2	1–1	3–2		0–1	1–0	4–0	0–2	0–2
Ponte Preta	0–2	2–1	2–0	3–1	2–2	3–0	1–2	0–1	1–0	3–1	0–0	0–0	1–1	1–0	0–2		3–1	1–0	0–1	0–1
Santos	4–0	5–1	5–2	3–1	1–0	3–0	1–0	3–0	0–0	3–1	3–1	1–3	3–1	2–0	2–1	2–2		3–0	2–2	1–0
São Paulo	4–2	1–0	1–1	0–0	1–1	3–1	1–0	3–2	2–1	0–0	0–3	2–0	2–0	3–0	1–1	3–0	3–2		3–0	2–2
Sport	4–1	0–0	3–0	3–0	2–0	1–0	0–0	4–1	0–1	1–0	1–0	1–0	3–0	2–1	2–2	1–1	1–1	2–0		2–1
Vasco	1–2	2–0	1–0	1–1	1–1	0–1	1–3	0–1	1–0	0–1	0–0	0–0	1–1	0–0	1–4	0–3	1–0	0–4	2–1	

Updated to match(es) played on 6 December 2015. Source: CBF
Legend: Blue = home team win; Yellow = draw; Red = away team win.

== Attendance ==
=== Average home attendances ===
Pos.	Team	GP	Total	High	Low	Average
1	Corinthians	19	650,862	45,469	10,144	34,256
2	Flamengo	19	635,544	67,011	12,814	33,450
3	Palmeiras	19	567,544	38,794	15,037	29,871
4	Grêmio	19	511,134	46,915	8,336	26,902
5	Atlético Mineiro	19	448,007	55,987	9,373	23,579
6	Cruzeiro	19	425,056	45,991	8,271	22,371
7	Internacional	19	407,251	35,766	11,415	21,434
8	São Paulo	19	391,708	59,612	11,066	20,616
9	Atlético Paranaense	19	334,957	27,327	10,499	17,629
10	Fluminense	19	334,940	55,999	4,749	17,628
11	Sport	19	307,155	41,994	3,046	16,166
12	Coritiba	19	278,485	34,287	7,925	14,657
13	Vasco	19	273,465	41,581	2,449	14,393
14	Joinville	19	177,868	15,731	5,979	9,361
15	Chapecoense	19	172,049	16,474	5,228	9,055
16	Figueirense	19	169,214	16,047	5,425	8,906
17	Santos	19	165,133	13,481	3,836	8,691
18	Avaí	19	161,751	14,582	4,810	8,513
19	Goiás	19	153,706	35,875	1,461	8,090
20	Ponte Preta	19	114,626	11,694	2,542	6,033
-	Total	380	6,671,696	67,011	1,461	17,557

Updated to games played on 6 December 2015.

Source: PerspectivaOnline.com.br

== Season statistics ==
=== Top scorers ===
Rank	Player	Club	Goals
1	(Brazil) Ricardo Oliveira	Santos	20
2	(Brazil) Vágner Love	Corinthians	14
3	(Brazil) André	Sport	13
3	(Brazil) Jádson	Corinthians	13
3	(Argentina) Lucas Pratto	Atlético Mineiro	13
6	(Brazil) Henrique Almeida	Coritiba	12
7	(Brazil) Vitinho	Internacional	11
7	(Brazil) Willian	Cruzeiro	11
9	(Brazil) Alexandre Pato	São Paulo	10
9	(Brazil) André Lima	Avaí	10
9	(Brazil) Dudu	Palmeiras	10
9	(Brazil) Erik	Goiás	10
9	(Brazil) Gabriel Barbosa	Santos	10
9	(Brazil) Luan	Grêmio	10

=== Hat-tricks ===
Player	For	Against	Result	Date	Ref
(Argentina) Lucas Pratto	Atlético Mineiro	São Paulo	3–1	29 July	
(Brazil) Willian^{4}	Cruzeiro	Figueirense	5–1	6 September	
(Paraguay) Lucas Barrios	Palmeiras	Fluminense	4–1	16 September	

^{4} Player scored 4 goals.

As of 6 December 2015.

Source: ESPN FC & Globo

== Awards ==
=== Annual awards ===
Award	Winner	Club
Coach of the Year	(Brazil) Tite	Corinthians
Revelation of the Championship	(Brazil) Gabriel Jesus	Palmeiras
Best Foreign Player	(Argentina) Lucas Pratto	Atlético Mineiro
Craque do Campeonato (Player of the Year)	(Brazil) Renato Augusto	Corinthians
Craque da Galera (Fan Player of the Year)	(Brazil) Nenê	Vasco da Gama
Top scorer	(Brazil) Ricardo Oliveira	Santos FC
Gol Mais Bonito (Best Goal)	(Brazil) Lucca	Corinthians

Série A Team of the Year
Goalkeeper	(Brazil) Cássio (Corinthians)			
Defence	(Brazil) Marcos Rocha (Atlético Mineiro)	(Brazil) Gil (Corinthians)	(Brazil) Jemerson (Atlético Mineiro)	(Brazil) Douglas Santos (Atlético Mineiro)
Midfield	(Brazil) Elias (Corinthians)	(Brazil) Rafael Carioca (Atlético Mineiro)	(Brazil) Jadson (Corinthians)	(Brazil) Renato Augusto (Corinthians)
Attack	(Brazil) Luan (Grêmio)		(Brazil) Ricardo Oliveira (Santos)	
