= 1940 Torneio Rio-São Paulo =

Torneio Rio-São Paulo
- Season: 1940
- Champions: None
- Matches: 36
- Goals: 177 (4.92 per match)
- Top goalscorer: Leônidas da Silva (Flamengo) – 13 goals
- Biggest away win: Portuguesa 1–9 Flamengo (4 Sep)

The 1940 Torneio Rio São Paulo was the 3rd edition of the Torneio Rio-São Paulo. It was disputed between 16 June to 22 September. The tournament was ended after the finish of the first half due to financial issues of Botafogo, Flamengo and Vasco da Gama. Due to the popularity of the Campeonato Brasileiro de Seleções Estaduais at the time, clubs from São Paulo also agreed to end the tournament. The competition was interrupted with Flamengo and Fluminense in the lead, without the CBD making the title official, however, the clubs and newspapers at the time considered the result definitive and declared the Flamengo and Fluminense as the legitimate champions of the competition. Both clubs currently consider themselves champions of the competition and include this title among their achievements.

== Participants ==
Team	City	Nº participations	Best result
America	Rio de Janeiro	3	8th (1933)
Botafogo	Rio de Janeiro	1	Debut
Corinthians	(São Paulo (state)) São Paulo	3	6th (1933)
Flamengo	Rio de Janeiro	2	1934
Fluminense	Rio de Janeiro	3	7th (1933)
Palestra Itália	(São Paulo (state)) São Paulo	3	Champions: 1933
Portuguesa	(São Paulo (state)) São Paulo	3	3rd (1933)
São Paulo	(São Paulo (state)) São Paulo	3	Runners-up: 1933
Vasco da Gama	Rio de Janeiro	3	5th (1933)

== Format ==
The tournament were originally planned in a double round-robin format, with the club with most points conquered being the champions. The matches between clubs of São Paulo were also valid for the Campeonato Paulista, and the matches between clubs of Rio de Janeiro were also valid for the Campeonato Carioca.

== Tournament ==
Following is the summary of the 1940 Torneio Rio-São Paulo tournament:

Pos	Team	Pld	W	D	L	GF	GA	GD	Pts
1	Flamengo	8	6	1	1	30	12	+18	13
2	Fluminense	8	5	3	0	25	15	+10	13
3	(São Paulo (state)) Corinthians	8	4	1	3	19	15	+4	9
4	(São Paulo (state)) Palestra Itália	8	3	2	3	22	19	+3	8
5	(São Paulo (state)) Portuguesa	8	3	1	4	13	23	−10	7
6	Botafogo	8	2	2	4	25	25	0	6
7	Vasco da Gama	8	2	2	4	17	19	−2	6
8	America	8	2	2	4	15	25	−10	6
9	(São Paulo (state)) São Paulo	8	1	2	5	11	24	−13	4

Source: RSSSF
Rules for classification: 1) points; 2) wins; 3) goal difference; 4) goals for.
