= 1940 Campeonato Paulista =

Campeonato Paulista
- Season: 1940
- Champions: Palestra Itália
- Matches: 110
- Goals: 478 (4.35 per match)
- Top goalscorer: Peixe (Ypiranga) – 21 goals
- Biggest home win: Corinthians 7–0 Comercial (June 30, 1940); Santos 8–1 Juventus (June 30, 1940)
- Biggest away win: Hespanha 1–8 São Paulo Railway (September 19, 1940)
- Highest scoring: Corinthians 7–3 São Paulo Railway (August 11, 1940)

The 1940 Campeonato Paulista da Primeira Divisão, organized by the LFESP (Liga de Futebol do Estado de São Paulo), was the 39th season of São Paulo's top professional football league. Palestra Itália won the title for the 8th time. No teams were relegated. Peixe from Ypiranga was the top scorer with 21 goals.

== Championship ==
The championship was disputed in a double-round robin system, with the team with the most points winning the title.

Pos	Team	Pld	W	D	L	GF	GA	GD	Pts	Qualification or relegation
1	Palestra Itália	20	15	3	2	53	19	+34	33	Champions
2	Portuguesa	20	13	4	3	46	24	+22	30	
3	Ypiranga	20	13	1	6	56	37	+19	27	
4	Corinthians	20	12	2	6	54	31	+23	26	
5	Portuguesa Santista	20	11	3	6	53	40	+13	25	
6	São Paulo	20	9	1	10	42	41	+1	19	
7	Santos	20	7	4	9	51	49	+2	18	
8	São Paulo Railway	20	5	6	9	44	50	−6	16	
9	Hespanha	20	5	0	15	25	47	−22	10	
10	Comercial	20	3	3	14	25	72	−47	9	
11	Juventus	20	3	1	16	29	68	−39	7	

Updated to match(es) played on December 29, 1940. Source: RSSSF.com
Rules for classification: 1) points; 2) goal difference; 3) wins; 4) head-to-head points.

== Top Scorers ==
Rank	Player	Club	Goals
1	Peixe	Ypiranga	21
2	Juan Raúl Echevarrieta	Palestra Itália	18
3	Teleco	Corinthians	16
4	Hemédio	São Paulo	14
5	Carmo	Portuguesa	13
6	Molina	Santos	10
