= Danny Sérgio =

Brazilian football manager (born 1978)

Personal information
- Full name: Danny Sérgio Guissoni
- Date of birth: 21 March 1978 (age 48)
- Place of birth: Goiânia, Brazil

Team information
- Current team: Vila Nova (fitness coach)

Managerial career
- Years: Team
- 2015: Goiás
- 2016: Goiás (assistant)
- 2016: Goiás (interim)

Danny Sérgio Guissoni (born 21 March 1978), known as Danny Sérgio, is a Brazilian football coach, currently employed at Vila Nova.

== Career ==
Born in Goiânia, Goiás, Danny Sérgio began his career as a fitness coach, joining Goiás in the 2000s. On 19 October 2015, after the dismissal of Arthur Neto, he was appointed manager of the main squad until the end of the campaign. For the 2016 season, he was named an assistant of Enderson Moreira, being also an interim for one Série B match in June.

On 11 February 2022, after 18 years at Goiás, Danny Sérgio was appointed fitness coach at Vila Nova.
