= Fla–Flu =

Association football match

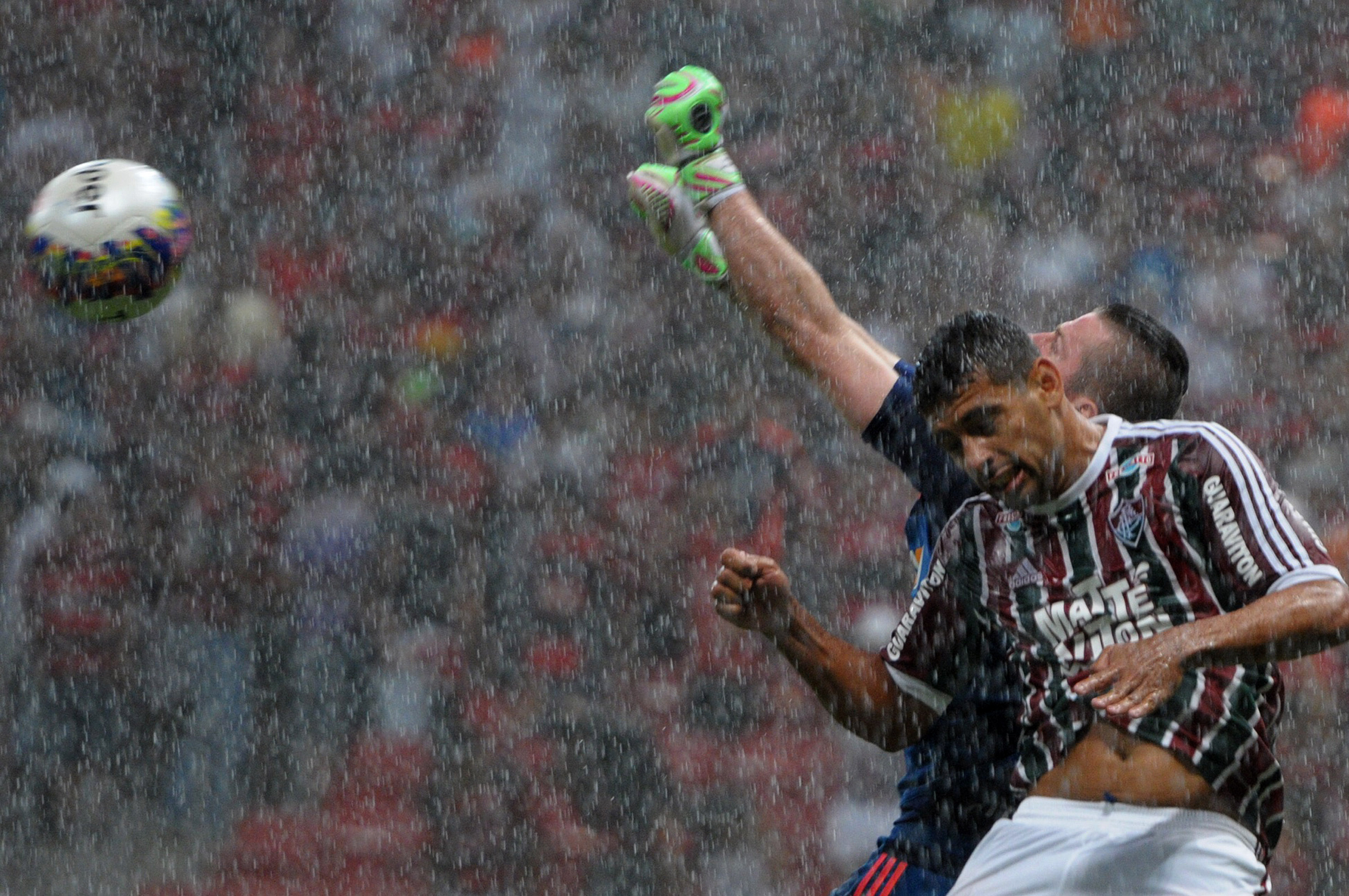
- Diego Souza (Fluminense) and Paulo Victor (Flamengo) fight over the ball in the rain.

- Flamengo Fluminense
- Location: Rio de Janeiro, State of Rio de Janeiro, Brazil
- First meeting: Fluminense 3–2 Flamengo; Campeonato Carioca (LMSA); 7 July 1912
- Latest meeting: Flamengo 1–0 Fluminense; Brazil Série A 11 October 2026
- Stadiums: Maracanã

Statistics
- Total meetings: 461
- Top scorer: Zico (19)
- All-time series: Flamengo: 169; Fluminense: 144; Draws: 148
- Largest victory: Flamengo 7–0 Fluminense; Torneio Municipal do Rio; June 10, 1945

Flamengo	Fluminense

Fla–Flu (a truncation of Flamengo–Fluminense) is an association football derby between Flamengo and Fluminense, considered one of the biggest rivalries in Brazilian football. Their matches usually take place at the famous Maracanã Stadium, located near downtown Rio de Janeiro, in the Maracanã district. The Fla–Flu holds the world's record football match attendance of 194,603 people in a 1963 derby.

The name "Fla–Flu" was created by the journalist Mário Filho during the professionalization of Rio de Janeiro's football.

Flamengo is the most successful team in the Campeonato Carioca, with 40 titles, while Fluminense is the second, with 33. At a national level, Flamengo has won the Campeonato Brasileiro eight times and the Copa do Brasil five times, while Fluminense has four Campeonato Brasileiro titles and has won the Cup once. Flamengo has won four Copa Libertadores and one Intercontinental Cup, whereas Fluminense has won the Copa Libertadores once and also the Copa Rio once, which it claims to be equivalent to a club's world cup tournament. Fluminense is the only football team in the world that holds the IOC's Olympic Cup ("Coupe Olympique" or "Taça Olímpica"), a non-competitive award for distinguished service in upholding the ideals of the Olympic Movement and to recognise the particular merits of institutions or associations and their services rendered to sport, conquered in 1949.

The rivalry between these two clubs began in October 1911, when a group of dissatisfied players from Fluminense left the club, and went to Flamengo, which at the time had no football department. The first Fla–Flu ever was played the following year, on July 7, 1912, at Laranjeiras stadium. Fluminense won this match 3–2, with 800 people in attendance.

The Fla–Flu matches are mentioned in Lamartine Babo's unofficial, but very popular, Flamengo anthem composed in 1942.

== Important matches ==
On November 23, 1941, Flamengo and Fluminense disputed the Campeonato Carioca final, at Gávea Stadium. As the stadium is located in Lagoa neighborhood, the match was nicknamed Lagoa's Fla-Flu. The first half of the match ended 2–1 to Fluminense. Flamengo's Pirillo scored a goal in the 39th minute of the second half of the match, but Fluminense only needed a draw in the match, and won the competition. 15,312 people watched the match.

In 1991, the Campeonato Carioca final was again disputed between Flamengo and Fluminense. The first leg, played on December 13, ended in a 1–1 draw. In the second leg, played on December 19, Flamengo beat Fluminense 4–2. The Flamengo goals were scored by Uidemar, Gaúcho, Zinho and Júnior. Both Fluminense goals were scored by Ézio. Flamengo's Gaúcho was the top goalscorer of that competition.

In the Campeonato Carioca history, Fluminense beat Flamengo to the title in 1919, 1936, 1941, 1969, 1973, 1983, 1984, 1995, 2022 and 2023. Flamengo beat Fluminense in 1963, 1972, 1991, 2017, 2020, 2021, 2025 and 2026. The Cariocão had many formats over the years. However, there is disagreement in the decision criterion on the 1919, 1969 and 1983 championships, won by Fluminense. Discussion that gained strength among Flamengo fans in early 2021, days before the 2021 Carioca Football Championship final, when Flamengo had the chance to pass Fluminense with this new criterion.

One of the most famous matches between the two clubs was the 1995 Campeonato Carioca final stage match, played on June 25 of that year at Maracanã stadium. In this match, Fluminense's Renato Gaúcho scored a belly goal, and his team won the match 3–2. Fluminense finished the stage with 33 points, winning the title, and Flamengo finished one point behind its rival, losing the championship in the year of its centenary.

The 2004 Campeonato Carioca had two matches played between Flamengo and Fluminense. On February 1, Flamengo won by 4–3, after Fluminense had been 3–1 up at half-time. On February 21, Flamengo defeated Fluminense 3–2, which gave Flamengo the Taça Guanabara title of that year.

== Highest attendances ==
1. Flamengo–Fluminense 0–0, 194,603 (177,656 paid), December 12, 1963
2. Flamengo–Fluminense 2–3, 171,599, June 15, 1969
3. Flamengo–Fluminense 0–0, 155,116, May 16, 1976
4. Flamengo–Fluminense 0–1, 153,520, December 16, 1984
5. Flamengo–Fluminense 0–2, 138,599, August 2, 1970
6. Flamengo–Fluminense 1–1, 138,557, April 22, 1979
7. Flamengo–Fluminense 5–2, 137,002, April 23, 1972
8. Flamengo–Fluminense 2–1, 136,829, September 7, 1972
9. Flamengo–Fluminense 3–3, 136,606, October 18, 1964
10. Flamengo–Fluminense 1–0, 124,432, September 23, 1979

== Statistics ==
=== Head to head results ===
As of 11 October 2026

Competition	Matches	Flamengo wins	Draws	Fluminense wins	Flamengo goals	Fluminense goals
Campeonato Brasileiro	77	29	20	28	93	85
Copa do Brasil	2	1	1	0	2	0
Copa Sudamericana	4	1	3	0	5	4
Torneio Rio–São Paulo	22	8	6	8	28	26
Campeonato Carioca (Note: A Fla-Flu played on August 3, 1940, won by Fluminense 2–1, was simultaneously valid for the Torneio Rio-São Paulo and for the Campeonato Carioca of that season. In this table, this match is only being considered as a Torneio Rio-São Paulo game so it is not counted twice.) (Note: In the 1998 Campeonato Carioca, the two teams received a double walkover in 13 May 1998, as both refused to play the match. This result is not included in this table.)	273	99	91	83	401	366
Other Rio tournaments (Note: Includes numerous short-lived official tournaments held by the Rio football federation and other local entities. Namely the Taça Guanabara Independente, Torneio Municipal do Rio, Torneio Extra, Torneio Relâmpago, Torneio Aberto, Copa da Capital and Taça Cidade Maravilhosa.)	37	14	10	13	52	56
Torneio Início Carioca (Note: Torneio Início matches were held with 20 or 30 minutes, and corners served as a tiebreaker. These matches are not considered official, as they do not follow the rules established by FIFA. However, they are included in the statistics of all Rio de Janeiro derbies.)	10	2	4	4	6	7
Friendly matches and competitions	37	15	13	8	69	51
Total	461	169	148	144	656	595

Sources: Flaestatística

=== Longest undefeated runs ===
Club	Games	Period	Results
Fluminense	13	28 October 1936 – 11 September 1938	9 wins and 4 draws
Flamengo	11	27 October 1912 – 15 August 1916	8 wins and 3 draws
Flamengo	11	18 October 1964 – 7 September 1966	4 wins and 7 draws

=== Most consecutive wins ===
Club	Games	Period
Flamengo	7	9 October 1912 – 9 May 1915
Fluminense	4	10 April 1938 – 11 September 1938
Fluminense	4	4 July 2021 – 30 March 2022

== Decisive matches ==
=== List of major finals between the clubs ===
Season	Competition	Date	Match	Score	Winner
1936	Campeonato Carioca	December 20, 1936	FLU – FLA	2–2	Fluminense
1936	Campeonato Carioca	December 23, 1936	FLU – FLA	4–1	Fluminense
1936	Campeonato Carioca	December 27, 1936	FLU – FLA	1–1	Fluminense
1973	Campeonato Carioca	August 22, 1973	FLU – FLA	4–2	Fluminense
1991	Campeonato Carioca	December 15, 1991	FLA – FLU	1–1	Flamengo
1991	Campeonato Carioca	December 19, 1991	FLA – FLU	4–2	Flamengo
2017	Campeonato Carioca	April 30, 2017	FLU – FLA	0–1	Flamengo
2017	Campeonato Carioca	May 7, 2017	FLA – FLU	2–1	Flamengo
2020	Campeonato Carioca	July 12, 2020	FLU – FLA	1–2	Flamengo
2020	Campeonato Carioca	July 15, 2020	FLA – FLU	1–0	Flamengo
2021	Campeonato Carioca	May 15, 2021	FLU – FLA	1–1	Flamengo
2021	Campeonato Carioca	May 22, 2021	FLA – FLU	3–1	Flamengo
2022	Campeonato Carioca	March 30, 2022	FLA – FLU	0–2	Fluminense
2022	Campeonato Carioca	April 2, 2022	FLU – FLA	1–1	Fluminense
2023	Campeonato Carioca	April 1, 2023	FLA – FLU	2–0	Fluminense
2023	Campeonato Carioca	April 9, 2023	FLU – FLA	4–1	Fluminense
2025	Campeonato Carioca	March 12, 2025	FLU – FLA	1–2	Flamengo
2025	Campeonato Carioca	March 16, 2025	FLA – FLU	0–0	Flamengo
2026	Campeonato Carioca	March 8, 2026	FLU – FLA	0–0 (4–5 p)	Flamengo

- Finals won: Flamengo 6, Fluminense 4.

=== Other decisive games ===
Campeonato Carioca

- November 23, 1941: Flamengo 2–2 Fluminense - Fluminense champion
- December 15, 1963: Flamengo 0–0 Fluminense - Flamengo champion
- September 9, 1972: Flamengo 2–1 Fluminense - Flamengo champion
- December 16, 1984: Fluminense 1–0 Flamengo - Fluminense champion
- June 25, 1995: Fluminense 3–2 Flamengo - Fluminense champion

=== Other official finals ===
Season	Competition	Date	Match	Score	Winner
1936	Torneio Aberto	September 13, 1936	FLA – FLU	1–1	Flamengo
1936	Torneio Aberto	September 20, 1936	FLU – FLA	0–1	Flamengo
1966	Taça Guanabara	September 7, 1966	FLU – FLA	3–1	Fluminense
2001	Taça Guanabara*	March 3, 2001	FLA – FLU	1–1 (5–3 p)	Flamengo
2004	Taça Guanabara*	February 21, 2004	FLU – FLA	2–3	Flamengo
2005	Taça Rio*	April 3, 2005	FLU – FLA	4–1	Fluminense
2017	Taça Guanabara*	March 5, 2023	FLA – FLU	3–3 (4–2 p)	Fluminense
2020	Taça Rio*	July 8, 2020	FLU – FLA	1–1 (3–2 p)	Fluminense

*Turnos of the Campeonato Carioca

- Finals won: Flamengo 3, Fluminense 4.

== Honours ==
=== Titles comparison ===
Type	Competitions	Flamengo	Fluminense
International	Intercontinental Cup	1	-
International	Rio International Cup	-	1
Continental	Copa Libertadores	4	1
Continental	Mercosur Cup	1	-
Continental	Copa de Oro Nicolás Leoz	1	-
Continental	Recopa Sudamericana	1	1
National	Brazilian Championship Série A^{(1)}	8	4
National	Union Cup	1	-
National	Brazil Cup	5	1
National	Brazil Super Cup	3	-
National	Brazilian Champions Cup	1	-
Inter-state	Rio – São Paulo Tournament^{(2)}	2	3
Inter-state	Primeira Liga	-	1
State	Carioca Championship	40	33
Total general		68	45

=== Titles by decade ===
Decade	Flamengo	Fluminense
1901–1910	–	4
1911–1920	3	4
1921–1930	3	1
1931–1940	2	5
1941–1950	3	2
1951–1960	3	5
1961–1970	3	3
1971–1980	6	5
1981–1990	8	4
1991–2000	7	1
2001–2010	8	4
2011–2020	11	3
2021–2030	11	4
Total	68	45

^{(1)} Flamengo considers the Copa União as a Campeonato Brasileiro but, although the Copa União is considered an official title, it is not officially considered a Campeonato Brasileiro. That makes Flamengo officially have 7 Campeonato Brasileiro.

^{(2)} In 1940 the competition was interrupted with Flamengo and Fluminense in the lead, without the CBD making the title official, however, the clubs and newspapers at the time considered the result definitive and declared the Flamengo and Fluminense as the legitimate champions of the competition. Both clubs currently consider themselves champions of the competition and include this title among their achievements.
