= Cassiá =

Brazilian footballer

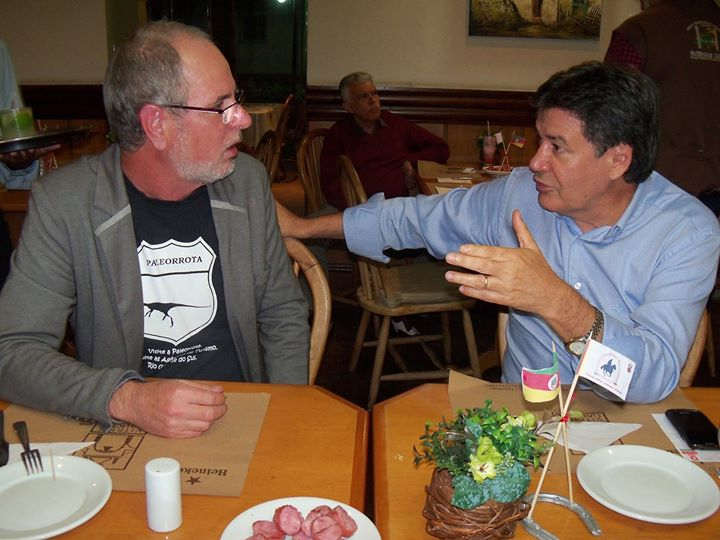
- Cassia Carpes

Personal information
- Full name: Jorge Antônio Dornelles Carpes
- Date of birth: 14 June 1953 (age 73)
- Place of birth: São Borja, Brazil
- Height: 1.78 m (5 ft 10 in)
- Position: Defender

Senior career*
Years	Team	Apps	(Gls)
1974–1977	Inter de São Borja		
1977–1979	Grêmio		
1979	Santos		
1980	Bahia		
1981	Operário-MS		
1982	São José-RS		
1983	Coritiba		

Managerial career
- 1984: São Borja
- 1985: Brasil de Pelotas
- 1985: Aimoré
- 1986: Novo Hamburgo
- 1986: São José-RS
- 1986: Bagé
- 1987: Cascavel
- 1987: Santo André
- 1988: Lajeadense
- 1990: Ypiranga de Erechim
- 1991: São Luiz
- 1991–1992: Pelotas
- 1993: Rio Branco-SP
- 1993: Grêmio
- 1994: Portuguesa
- 1995: Rio Branco-SP
- 1997: Bragantino
- 1997: Rio Branco-SP
- 1997: Juventude
- 1998: Ponte Preta
- 1998: Internacional
- 1999: Figueirense
- 1999: Criciúma
- * Club domestic league appearances and goals

Jorge Antônio Dornelles Carpes known as Cassiá (born 14 June 1953) is a retired Brazilian professional football player, who played as defender and a manager.

== Career ==
He is currently a state representative in Rio Grande do Sul. He graduated to apply for Deputy Governor of the State of Rio Grande do Sul by Solidarity (SD) in Hope coalition that unites the Rio Grande, with the candidate to Ana Amélia Lemos Government, PP.

Began his professional career in the Internacional de São Borja in 1974. Later he played for the teams: Grêmio, Santos, Bahia, Operário-MS, São José-RS, Coritiba, where he finished his career in 1983.

Since 1980s he coached the São Borja, Brasil de Pelotas, Aimoré, Novo Hamburgo, São José-RS, Bagé, Cascavel, Santo André, Lajeadense, Ypiranga-RS, São Luiz, Pelotas, Rio Branco-SP, Grêmio, Portuguesa de Desportos, Bragantino, Juventude, Ponte Preta, Internacional, Figueirense and Criciúma.

== Honours ==
=== Player ===
Grêmio

- Campeonato Gaúcho: 1977

Operário-MS

- Campeonato Sul-Mato-Grossense: 1981

=== Manager ===
Grêmio

- Campeonato Gaúcho: 1993
