= Nikolas (footballer) =

Brazilian footballer (born 2006)

Personal information
- Full name: Nikolas Francisco Santos de Barros
- Date of birth: 6 August 2006 (age 20)
- Place of birth: Guarujá, Brazil
- Height: 1.73 m (5 ft 8 in)
- Position: Attacking midfielder

Team information
- Current team: Ponte Preta

Youth career
- Lemense
- 2024: Cianorte
- 2024: → Ponte Preta (loan)
- 2025–2026: Ponte Preta

Senior career*
Years	Team	Apps	(Gls)
2026–	Ponte Preta	5	(0)
- * Club domestic league appearances and goals as of 14:44, 10 February 2026 (UTC)

Nikolas Francisco Santos de Barros (born 6 August 2006), simply known as Nikolas, is a Brazilian footballer who currently plays as an attacking midfielder for Ponte Preta.

== Career ==
Born in Guarujá, São Paulo, Nikolas played for Lemense and Cianorte before joining Ponte Preta's youth sides in June 2024, initially on loan. After impressing with the under-20 team, he was promoted to the main squad in January 2026, and made his senior debut on 11 January, coming on as a late substitute for fellow youth graduate Gustavo Telles in a 3–0 Campeonato Paulista away loss to Corinthians.

On 27 January 2026, after attracting interest from Corinthians and Santos, Nikolas renewed his link with Ponte until January 2029.

== Career statistics ==
=== Club ===
As of 10 February 2026

Appearances and goals by club, season and competition
Club	Season	League			State League		Cup		Other		Total	
Club	Season	Division	Apps	Goals	Apps	Goals	Apps	Goals	Apps	Goals	Apps	Goals
Ponte Preta	2026	Série B	0	0	5	0	0	0	—		5	0
Career total			0	0	5	0	0	0	0	0	5	0
