= Felipe Moreira =

Felipe Moreira may refer to:

- Felipe Moreira (footballer, born 1981), Brazilian football manager and former midfielder
- Felipe Moreira (footballer, born 1988), Brazilian football forward

== See also ==
- Filipe Moreira (born 1964), Portuguese football manager
