= 1940 São Paulo FC season =

São Paulo
1940 season
- Chairman: Piragibe Nogueira; Paulo Machado de Carvalho
- Manager: Amílcar Barbuy; Ramón Platero
- Torneio Rio-São Paulo: 9th
- Campeonato Paulista: 6th

The 1940 football season was São Paulo's 11th season since the club's founding in 1930.

== Overall ==
Games played	48 (8# Torneio Rio-São Paulo, 20# Campeonato Paulista, 23 Friendly match)
Games won	20 (1# Torneio Rio-São Paulo, 9# Campeonato Paulista, 11 Friendly match)
Games drawn	6 (2 Torneio Rio-São Paulo, 1 Campeonato Paulista, 3 Friendly match)
Games lost	22 (5# Torneio Rio-São Paulo, 10# Campeonato Paulista, 9 Friendly match)
Goals scored	115
Goals conceded	107
Goal difference	+8
Best result	8–0 (A) v Primeiro de Maio - Friendly match - 1940.04.21
Worst result	1–8 (A) v Botafogo - Torneio Rio-São Paulo - 1940.07.10
Most appearances	
Top scorer	

Source: São Paulo FC

- # Match valid simultaneously for the Campeonato Paulista and Torneio Rio-São Paulo.

== Friendlies ==
January 25 National	São Paulo	4–3	Portuguesa	São Paulo
	Goal		Goal	Stadium: Estádio Antônio Alonso (Antarctica Paulista)

February 11 National	São Paulo	3–1	Juventus	São Paulo
	Goal		Goal	Stadium: Estádio Antônio Alonso (Antarctica Paulista)

February 17 National	Portuguesa Santista	5–4	São Paulo	Santos
	Goal		Goal	Stadium: Estádio Ulrico Mursa

March 3 National	Corinthians	2–1	São Paulo	São Paulo
	Goal		Goal	Stadium: Estádio Alfredo Schürig (Parque São Jorge)

March 14 National	Palestra Itália	3–1	São Paulo	São Paulo
	Goal		Goal	Stadium: Estádio Palestra Itália (Parque Antarctica)

March 16 National	São Paulo	6–0	Juventus	São Paulo
	Goal			Stadium: Estádio Antônio Alonso (Antarctica Paulista)

March 17 National	São Paulo	3–0	Portuguesa	São Paulo
	Goal			Stadium: Estádio Antônio Alonso (Antarctica Paulista)

March 24 National	Corinthians	4–1	São Paulo	São Paulo
	Goal		Goal	Stadium: Estádio Alfredo Schürig (Parque São Jorge)

March 30 National	São Paulo	2–1	São Paulo Railway	São Paulo
	Goal		Goal	Stadium: Estádio Antônio Alonso (Antarctica Paulista)

April 7 National	São Paulo	4–1	Portuguesa Santista	São Paulo
	Goal		Goal	Stadium: Estádio Antônio Alonso (Antarctica Paulista)

April 14 National	Portuguesa Santista	2–1	São Paulo	Santos
	Goal		Goal	Stadium: Estádio Ulrico Mursa

April 21 National	Primeiro de Maio	0–8	São Paulo	Santo André
			Goal

May 11 Taça Arouche	São Paulo	5–6	America-RJ	São Paulo
	Goal		Goal	Stadium: Estádio Paulo Machado de Carvalho (Pacaembu)

May 14 Taça Royal	São Paulo	0–2	Flamengo	São Paulo
			Goal	Stadium: Estádio Paulo Machado de Carvalho (Pacaembu)

May 17 National	São Paulo	0–2	Flamengo	São Paulo
			Goal	Stadium: Estádio Paulo Machado de Carvalho (Pacaembu)

June 2 National	Elvira	0–1	São Paulo	Jacareí
			Goal	Stadium: Jardim Leonídia (Campo do Ponte Preta FC)

June 4 National	São Paulo	3–3	Vasco da Gama	São Paulo
	Goal		Goal	Stadium: Estádio Paulo Machado de Carvalho (Pacaembu)

June 11 National	São Paulo	4–0	Vasco da Gama	São Paulo
	Goal			Stadium: Estádio Paulo Machado de Carvalho (Pacaembu)

July 28 National	EC São Bernardo	1–3	São Paulo	São Bernardo do Campo
	Goal		Goal

September 1 National	Bragantino	1–4	São Paulo	Bragança Paulista
	Goal		Goal	Stadium: Estádio Marcelo Stéfani

September 25 National	São Paulo	3–3	Atlético Mineiro	São Paulo
	Goal		Goal	Stadium: Estádio Paulo Machado de Carvalho (Pacaembu)

October 1 National	São Paulo	4–3	Atlético Mineiro	São Paulo
	Goal		Goal	Stadium: Estádio Paulo Machado de Carvalho (Pacaembu)

October 13 National	Penhense	0–2	São Paulo	São Paulo
			Goal

November 15 National	São Paulo	2–5	Botafogo	São Paulo
	Goal		Goal	Stadium: Estádio Paulo Machado de Carvalho (Pacaembu)

November 19 National	São Paulo	2–2	America-RJ	São Paulo
	Goal		Goal	Stadium: Estádio Paulo Machado de Carvalho (Pacaembu)

== Official competitions ==
=== Campeonato Paulista ===
May 26 1	São Paulo	3–1	Juventus	São Paulo
	Goal		Goal	Stadium: Estádio Antônio Alonso (Antarctica Paulista)

June 9 2	São Paulo	0–0	São Paulo Railway	São Paulo
				Stadium: Estádio Paulo Machado de Carvalho (Pacaembu)

June 23 3	São Paulo	1–2	Espanha	São Paulo
	Goal		Goal	Stadium: Estádio Paulo Machado de Carvalho (Pacaembu)

June 30 4#	São Paulo	0–2	Portuguesa	São Paulo
			Goal	Stadium: Estádio Paulo Machado de Carvalho (Pacaembu)

July 7 5	São Paulo	4–2	Portuguesa Santista	São Paulo
	Goal		Goal	Stadium: Estádio Paulo Machado de Carvalho (Pacaembu)

July 14 6	Comercial	0–5	São Paulo	São Paulo
			Goal	Stadium: Rua São Jorge

August 4 7	Ypiranga	4–0	São Paulo	São Paulo
	Goal			Stadium: Rua dos Ituanos

August 11 8#	Palestra Itália	3–1	São Paulo	São Paulo
	Goal		Goal	Stadium: Estádio Palestra Itália (Parque Antarctica)

August 18 9	Santos	5–1	São Paulo	Santos
	Goal		Goal	Stadium: Estádio Urbano Caldeira (Vila Belmiro)

August 25 10#	São Paulo	3–2	Corinthians	São Paulo
	Goal		Goal	Stadium: Estádio Paulo Machado de Carvalho (Pacaembu)

September 8 11	São Paulo	3–1	Juventus	São Paulo
	Goal		Goal	Stadium: Estádio Paulo Machado de Carvalho (Pacaembu)

September 22 12	São Paulo	2–3	Ypiranga	São Paulo
	Goal		Goal	Stadium: Estádio Paulo Machado de Carvalho (Pacaembu)

September 29 13	Espanha	2–3	São Paulo	Santos
	Goal		Goal	Stadium: Estádio Ulrico Mursa

October 6 14	São Paulo	0–2	São Paulo Railway	São Paulo
			Goal	Stadium: Estádio Paulo Machado de Carvalho (Pacaembu)

October 20 15	São Paulo	2–1	Portuguesa	São Paulo
	Goal		Goal	Stadium: Estádio Paulo Machado de Carvalho (Pacaembu)

November 3 16	São Paulo	7–2	Comercial	São Paulo
	Goal		Goal	Stadium: Estádio Paulo Machado de Carvalho (Pacaembu)

December 1 17	Portuguesa Santista	1–0	São Paulo	Santos
	Goal			Stadium: Estádio Ulrico Mursa

December 8 18	Palestra Itália	4–1	São Paulo	São Paulo
	Goal		Goal	Stadium: Estádio Paulo Machado de Carvalho (Pacaembu)

December 14 19	São Paulo	6–1	Santos	São Paulo
	Goal		Goal	Stadium: Estádio Paulo Machado de Carvalho (Pacaembu)

December 22 20	Corinthians	3–0	São Paulo	São Paulo
	Goal			Stadium: Estádio Alfredo Schürig (Parque São Jorge)

- # Match valid simultaneously for the Campeonato Paulista and Torneio Rio-São Paulo.

==== Record ====
Final Position	Points	Matches	Wins	Draws	Losses	Goals For	Goals Away	Win%
6th	19	20	9	1	10	42	41	47%

=== Torneio Rio-São Paulo ===
June 30 1#	São Paulo	0–2	Portuguesa	São Paulo
			Goal	Stadium: Estádio Paulo Machado de Carvalho (Pacaembu)

July 10 2	Botafogo	8–1	São Paulo	Rio de Janeiro
	Goal		Goal	Stadium: Estádio Manoel Schwartz (das Laranjeiras)

July 24 3	São Paulo	1–1	Vasco da Gama	São Paulo
	Goal		Goal	Stadium: Estádio Paulo Machado de Carvalho (Pacaembu)

July 31 4	America-RJ	3–1	São Paulo	Rio de Janeiro
	Goal		Goal	Stadium: Estádio São Januário

August 11 5#	Palestra Itália	3–1	São Paulo	São Paulo
	Goal		Goal	Stadium: Estádio Palestra Itália (Parque Antarctica)

August 14 6	São Paulo	2–2	Flamengo	São Paulo
	Goal		Goal	Stadium: Estádio Paulo Machado de Carvalho (Pacaembu)

August 25 7#	São Paulo	3–2	Corinthians	São Paulo
	Goal		Goal	Stadium: Estádio Paulo Machado de Carvalho (Pacaembu)

September 11 8	Fluminense	3–2	São Paulo	Rio de Janeiro
	Goal		Goal	Stadium: Estádio Manoel Schwartz (das Laranjeiras)

- # Match valid simultaneously for the Campeonato Paulista and Torneio Rio-São Paulo.

==== Record ====
Final Position	Points	Matches	Wins	Draws	Losses	Goals For	Goals Away	Win%
9th	4	8	1	2	5	11	24	25%
