= 1940 Campeonato Carioca =

Campeonato Carioca
- Season: 1940
- Champions: Fluminense
- Matches: 108
- Goals: 456 (4.22 per match)
- Top goalscorer: Leônidas (Flamengo) – 30 goals
- Biggest home win: Flamengo 6-0 São Cristóvão (November 15, 1940); Flamengo 7-1 Bonsucesso (December 15, 1940)
- Biggest away win: Bonsucesso 0-8 Vasco da Gama (December 22, 1940)
- Highest scoring: Madureira 4-7 Fluminense (June 23, 1940); Bonsucesso 5-6 Madureira (November 15, 1940)

The 1940 edition of the Campeonato Carioca kicked off on April 21, 1940 and ended on December 22, 1940. It was organized by LFRJ (Liga de Futebol do Rio de Janeiro, or Rio de Janeiro Football League). Nine teams participated. Fluminense won the title for the 13th time. no teams were relegated.

== System ==
The tournament would be disputed in a triple round-robin format, with the team with the most points winning the title.

== Championship ==
| Pos | Team | Pld | W | D | L | GF | GA | GD | Pts | Qualification or relegation |
|---|---|---|---|---|---|---|---|---|---|---|
| 1 | Fluminense | 24 | 17 | 4 | 3 | 62 | 31 | +31 | 38 | Champions |
| 2 | Flamengo | 24 | 17 | 3 | 4 | 72 | 30 | +42 | 37 | |
| 3 | Vasco da Gama | 24 | 17 | 2 | 5 | 67 | 31 | +36 | 36 | |
| 4 | Botafogo | 24 | 12 | 6 | 6 | 60 | 46 | +14 | 30 | |
| 5 | Madureira | 24 | 9 | 3 | 12 | 52 | 64 | −12 | 21 | |
| 6 | América | 24 | 9 | 2 | 13 | 45 | 45 | 0 | 20 | |
| 7 | Bonsucesso | 24 | 5 | 4 | 15 | 34 | 69 | −35 | 14 | |
| 8 | São Cristóvão | 24 | 5 | 1 | 18 | 29 | 66 | −37 | 11 | |
| 9 | Bangu | 24 | 4 | 1 | 19 | 35 | 74 | −39 | 9 | |

Updated to match(es) played on December 22, 1940. Source: RSSSF.com
Rules for classification: 1) points; 2) goal difference; 3) wins; 4) number of goals scored.

=== Top Scores ===
| Rank | Player | Club | Goals |
|---|---|---|---|
| 1 | Leonidas | Flamengo | 30 |
| 2 | Segundo Villadóniga | Vasco da Gama | |
| 3 | Isaias | Madureira | 21 |
| 4 | Gallego | Bonsucesso | 14 |
| 5 | Hércules | Fluminense | 12 |
| 5 | Nelsinho | América | 12 |
| 7 | Mário Milani | Fluminense | 11 |
| 7 | Pascoal | Botafogo | 11 |
