= Vinícius Barreta =

Brazilian footballer

Personal information
- Full name: Vinícius Teodoro Barreta Melo
- Date of birth: 16 April 1999 (age 27)
- Place of birth: Lages, Brazil
- Height: 1.88 m (6 ft 2 in)
- Position: Goalkeeper

Team information
- Current team: Figueirense

Youth career
- 2017: Criciúma

Senior career*
Years	Team	Apps	(Gls)
2017–2019	Criciúma	3	(0)
2019–2021	Cruzeiro	0	(0)
2022–	Cuiabá	1	(0)
2024–	Figueirense	5	(0)
2026–	→ Portuguesa (loan)	2	(0)
- * Club domestic league appearances and goals as of 10 November 2026

Vinícius Teodoro Barreta Melo (born 16 April 1999), known as Vinícius Barreta or just Vinícius, is a Brazilian footballer who plays as a goalkeeper for Portuguesa, on loan from Figueirense.

== Career ==
Born in Lages, Vinícius started his career in Criciúma in 2017. That year he made four games. In 2018 he made only two games.

Vinícius played one match for Criciúma in 2019, and in April of that year, he was announced by Cruzeiro.
