= Cemitério da Paz =

Peace Cemetery
- Interactive map of Peace Cemetery

Details
- Established: 1965
- Location: São Paulo
- Country: Brazil
- Coordinates: 23.61176°S 46.74426°W
- Website: Cemitério da Paz

The Cemitério da Paz (Peace Cemetery) is a necropolis located at the Rua Dr. Luiz Migliano, 644 - Jardim Vazani, São Paulo City, Brazil. It was inaugurated in 1965 and is the first garden cemetery in Brazil and is known as "Protestant Cemetery", but maintains an ecumenical character and an equal treatment to its associates.

The space was created due to the death of the German jurist and professor at Largo San Francisco Law School, Julius Frank, on 19 June 1841. As a Lutheran, Frank cannot be buried in cemeteries. existing at the time, and was buried in the courtyard of the Faculty of Law of São Paulo, and thus was created the Protestant Cemetery Association, which is the manager of the Peace Cemetery and other ecumenical cemeteries.

Among other people, in it is buried the soccer player Leônidas da Silva, the "Black Diamond".

== Notable burials ==
- Adoniran Barbosa, singer and composer
- Jânio Quadros, 22nd President of Brasil
- Marcelo Fromer, guitarist of Brazilian rock band Titãs
- Leônidas da Silva, soccer player
- Wilson Fittipaldi Sr., the father of Wilson Fittipaldi, former racing driver and Formula One team owner
- Otávio Frias Filho - editorial director of Folha de S. Paulo.
