= Marco Aurélio (footballer, born 1952) =

Brazilian footballer and manager

Personal information
- Full name: Marco Aurélio Moreira
- Date of birth: 10 February 1952 (age 74)
- Place of birth: Muriaé, Brazil
- Position: Midfielder

Senior career*
Years	Team	Apps	(Gls)
1970–1972	Fluminense		
1972	Vitória		
1973–1975	Fluminense		
1975	Noroeste		
1976–1982	Ponte Preta		
1982	São Bento		
1983	Taubaté		
1984–1987	Coritiba		

Managerial career
- 1998–1999: Ponte Preta
- 2000: Vitória
- 2000: Cruzeiro
- 2000–2001: Palmeiras
- 2001–2002: Cruzeiro
- 2002: Ponte Preta
- 2002–2003: Kashiwa Reysol
- 2004: Ponte Preta
- 2004: Cruzeiro
- 2005: Figueirense
- 2005: Atlético Mineiro
- 2006: Ponte Preta
- 2007: Fortaleza
- 2007: Vitória
- 2007–2009: Ponte Preta
- 2010: América Mineiro
- 2015: Bragantino
- * Club domestic league appearances and goals

Marco Aurélio Moreira (born 10 February 1952) is a Brazilian former professional football coach and player. Before his career as a coach, Marco Aurélio played as a midfielder, most notably for Fluminense.

== Personal life ==
Marco Aurélio's son, Felipe Moreira, is also a coach.

== Coaching statistics ==
Team	From	To	Record				
Team	From	To	G	W	D	L	Win %
Kashiwa Reysol	2002	2003	45	15	13	17	33.33
Total			45	15	13	17	33.33

== Honours ==
=== Player ===
Fluminense

- Campeonato Carioca: 1973

Coritiba

- Campeonato Brasileiro: 1985
- Campeonato Paranaense: 1986

=== Coach ===
Cruzeiro

- Copa do Brasil: 2000
- Copa Sul-Minas: 2002
- Supercampeonato Mineiro: 2002
