= Juan Raul Echevarrieta =

Argentine footballer

Personal information
- Date of birth: 23 July 1911 Olavarría,provincia de Buenos Aires, Argentina
- Date of death: 27 November 1987
- Place of death: Florianópolis, Brazil
- Position: Striker

Juan Raul Echevarrieta (23 July 1911(Olavarría , provincia de Buenos Aires, Argentina)– 27 November 1987 in Florianópolis) was an Argentine football player at the position of striker.

== Career ==
He played for Gimnasia y Esgrima, Palmeiras, Santos and Ypiranga. Echevarrieta scored 127 goals for Palmeiras and is one of the club's all-time leading scorers.

== Honours ==
- Palmeiras
  - São Paulo State Championship: 1940, 1942
