= Hudson Coutinho =

Brazilian football manager (born 1972)

Personal information
- Full name: Hudson José Coutinho
- Date of birth: 12 July 1972 (age 54)
- Place of birth: Florianópolis, Santa Catarina, Brazil)

Managerial career
- Years: Team
- 2007: Figueirense (interim)
- 2012–2013: Guarani de Palhoça
- 2013–2015: Figueirense (assistant)
- 2015–2016: Figueirense
- 2017: Marcilio Dias

Hudson José Coutinho (born 12 July 1972), known as Hudson Coutinho, is a Brazilian football assistant manager.

== Career ==
Born in Florianópolis, Santa Catarina, Coutinho joined hometown's Figueirense in 2000, as a fitness coach, after a brief spell at Guarani de Palhoça. After nine years at the club – which included being manager for one match as an interim in 2007 – he moved to Náutico.

In July 2012, after another fitness coach experiences at Chapecoense, Marcílio Dias and Hercílio Luz, Coutinho was appointed manager of his previous club Guarani. He achieved promotion with the club in the state league, as champions, but was still sacked on 25 February of the following year.

In March 2013 Coutinho returned to his former side Figueirense, as an assistant manager. On 19 September 2015 he was named interim manager, replacing sacked René Simões.

On 21 September 2015 Coutinho was permanently appointed as manager of Figueira, after a request from the squad.

== Honours ==
Guarani de Palhoça

- Campeonato Catarinense Divisão Especial: 2012
