= Pachequinho =

Brazilian footballer and coach

Personal information
- Full name: Eriélton Carlos Pacheco
- Date of birth: 26 September 1970 (age 56)
- Place of birth: Ponta Grossa, Brazil
- Height: 1.64 m (5 ft 4 1/2 in)
- Position: Forward

Senior career*
Years	Team	Apps	(Gls)
1990–1996	Coritiba	79	(20)
1997	Bahia		
1997	Atlético Paranaense	20	(7)
1998	Matonense		
1998	Atlético Paranaense		
1999–2000	Criciúma	10	(1)

Managerial career
- 2015: Coritiba (interim)
- 2016–2017: Coritiba (assistant)
- 2016: Coritiba (interim)
- 2017: Coritiba
- 2018: América de Natal
- 2019: Anapolina
- 2020: Maringá
- 2020: Coritiba (assistant)
- 2020: Coritiba (interim)
- 2020: Coritiba (interim)
- * Club domestic league appearances and goals

Eriélton Carlos Pacheco (born 26 September 1970), known as Pachequinho, is a Brazilian retired footballer who played as a forward, and is a current manager.

== Playing career ==
Pachequinho was born in Ponta Grossa, Paraná, and was a Coritiba youth graduate. He made his senior debut on 11 February 1990, in a 3–0 win against Nove de Julho, and scored his first senior goal one month later, in a match against Matsubara.

Pachequinho left Coxa in 1996, with 215 matches and 64 goals. He subsequently represented Bahia, Atlético Paranaense, Matonense, Paraná and Criciúma before retiring in 2000 at the age of 30, mainly due to injuries.

== Manager career ==
After his retirement, Pachequinho worked at his first club Coritiba, as a scout. On 4 November 2015, after the dismissal of Ney Franco, he was appointed interim manager of the main squad.

On 9 November, Pachequinho was definitely appointed manager until the end of the year.

== Honours ==
=== Manager ===
Coritiba

- Campeonato Paranaense: 2017

=== Individual ===
- Campeonato Paranaense top goalscorer: 1995
