= Felipe Moreira (footballer, born 1981) =

Brazilian footballer and manager

Personal information
- Full name: Felipe José Feres Moreira
- Date of birth: 15 January 1981 (age 45)
- Place of birth: Campinas, Brazil
- Position: Midfielder

Youth career
- 1996–2000: Ponte Preta

Senior career*
Years	Team	Apps	(Gls)
2000–2003	Ponte Preta		

Managerial career
- 2003: Kashiwa Reysol (assistant)
- 2004: Ponte Preta (assistant)
- 2004: Cruzeiro (assistant)
- 2005: Figueirense (assistant)
- 2005: Atlético Mineiro (assistant)
- 2006: Ponte Preta (assistant)
- 2007: Fortaleza (assistant)
- 2007: Vitória (assistant)
- 2007–2009: Ponte Preta (assistant)
- 2010: América Mineiro (assistant)
- 2012: Betim (assistant)
- 2013: Cuiabá (assistant)
- 2014–2015: Bragantino (assistant)
- 2015–2016: Ponte Preta (assistant)
- 2015: Ponte Preta (interim)
- 2016–2017: Ponte Preta
- 2018: Ponte Preta U20
- 2018–2021: Ponte Preta (assistant)
- 2019: Ponte Preta (interim)
- 2022: Santo André (assistant)
- 2022: Ferroviária (assistant)
- 2022: Ponte Preta (assistant)
- 2023: Ponte Preta (assistant)
- 2023: Ponte Preta
- 2024: Hercílio Luz
- 2025: Goiatuba
- 2025: Cuiabá (assistant)
- * Club domestic league appearances and goals

Felipe José Feres Moreira (born 15 January 1981) is a Brazilian football coach and former player who played as a midfielder.

== Career ==
Moreira was a Ponte Preta youth graduate. After suffering a severe knee injury at the age of 22, he retired.

Moreira subsequently joined his father's staff, as an assistant manager. In December 2014 he was named Bragantino assistant, despite the club lacking a first team manager.

In 2015 Moreira returned to Ponte Preta, again as an assistant. On 7 October, after Doriva's departure to São Paulo, he was named interim manager.

On 2 December 2016, after Eduardo Baptista's departure to Palmeiras, Moreira was named manager of Ponte ahead of the 2017 season.

Moreira returned to Ponte for the 2023 season, as an assistant, before being named head coach on 19 April of that year. On 22 July, he was sacked.

== Personal life ==
Moreira's father, Marco Aurelio Moreira, was also a footballer and manager. He too played and managed Ponte Preta.
