= Artur Neto =

Brazilian football manager

Personal information
- Full name: Artur Alves da Silva Neto
- Date of birth: 17 January 1955 (age 71)
- Place of birth: Rio de Janeiro, Brazil

Team information
- Current team: Goiânia

Managerial career
- Years: Team
- 1988 1989: Mogi Mirim; Pouso Alegre
- 1990: Anapolina
- 1991: XV de Jaú
- 1992: Ituano
- 1993: CRB
- 1994: Criciúma
- 1995: Sãocarlense
- 1996: Sampaio Corrêa
- 1997: Ituano
- 1998: ABC
- 1998: Ceará
- 1998–1999: Náutico
- 2000: Joinville
- 2000: Atlético Paranaense
- 2000: Botafogo-SP
- 2001: Figueirense
- 2001: Joinville
- 2002: Ceará
- 2002: Juventude
- 2003: Shanxi Guoli
- 2004: Figueirense
- 2004–2006: Paysandu
- 2006: América de Natal
- 2006: Joinville
- 2006–2007: Remo
- 2007: Atlético Goianiense
- 2008: Vila Nova
- 2009: ABC
- 2009: Itumbiara
- 2009: América de Natal
- 2009: Atlético Goianiense
- 2010–2011: Goiás
- 2011: Vila Nova
- 2012: Rio Verde
- 2012: Atlético Goianiense
- 2012–2013: Joinville
- 2015: Goiás
- 2019–: Goiânia

Artur Alves da Silva Neto known as Artur Neto (born 17 January 1955, in Rio de Janeiro) is a Brazilian professional football manager.

== Honours ==
CRB

- Campeonato Alagoano: 1993

ABC

- Campeonato Potiguar: 1998

Ceará

- Campeonato Cearense: 1998, 2002

Joinville

- Campeonato Catarinense: 2000, 2001
- Copa Santa Catarina: 2012

Atlético Goianiense

- Campeonato Goiano: 2007
