= Gustavo Telles =

Brazilian footballer (born 2005)

Personal information
- Full name: Gustavo Lopes Telles
- Date of birth: 28 April 2005 (age 21)
- Place of birth: Coronel Fabriciano, Minas Gerais, Brazil
- Height: 1.78 m (5 ft 10 in)
- Position: Midfielder

Team information
- Current team: Ponte Preta
- Number: 35

Youth career
- Atlético Goianiense
- 2022: Bahia
- 2023–2024: Ipatinga
- 2024: → Rondoniense (loan)
- 2025: Ponte Preta

Senior career*
Years	Team	Apps	(Gls)
2025–	Ponte Preta	38	(0)
- * Club domestic league appearances and goals as of 18 November 2026

Gustavo Lopes Telles (born 28 April 2005) is a Brazilian footballer who currently plays as a midfielder for Ponte Preta.

== Career ==
=== Early career ===
Born in Coronel Fabriciano in the Brazilian state of Minas Gerais, Telles began his career in the academies of Atlético Goianiense and Bahia before joining Ipatinga in 2023. He was loaned to Rondoniense for the first half of 2024, helping the team compete in the Copinha.

In June 2023, while playing for Ipatinga, Telles was invited by German side Bayern Munich to be part of their World Squad initiative, representing the club in international friendlies. Having scored in a 1–0 friendly win against Bayern's under-19 side at the end of the programme, he was invited back the following year, alongside compatriot Maycon Cardozo.

=== Ponte Preta ===
Having signed for Ponte Preta ahead of the 2025 season, his appearances in the Copinha caught the attention of manager Alberto Valentim, and he was promoted to the first team at the conclusion of the youth competition.

He made his professional debut on 5 February 2025, coming on as a substitute for Lucas Cândido in a 2–1 win against Noroeste. Following the game, he celebrated by embracing his father through the fence at Estádio Alfredo de Castilho, a gesture which garnered national attention. At the end of February, he signed a professional contract with Ponte Preta - a three-year deal.

== Career statistics ==
=== Club ===
As of 16 June 2026

Appearances and goals by club, season and competition
Club	Season	League			State League		Cup		Other		Total	
Club	Season	Division	Apps	Goals	Apps	Goals	Apps	Goals	Apps	Goals	Apps	Goals
Ponte Preta	2025	Série C	10	0	2 (Note: Appearances in the Campeonato Paulista)	0	0	0	0	0	12	0
Ponte Preta	2026	Série B	3	0	7	0	0	0	0	0	10	0
Career total			13	0	9	0	0	0	0	0	22	0
