= Leônidas (footballer, born 1913) =

Brazilian footballer and commentator (1913–2004)

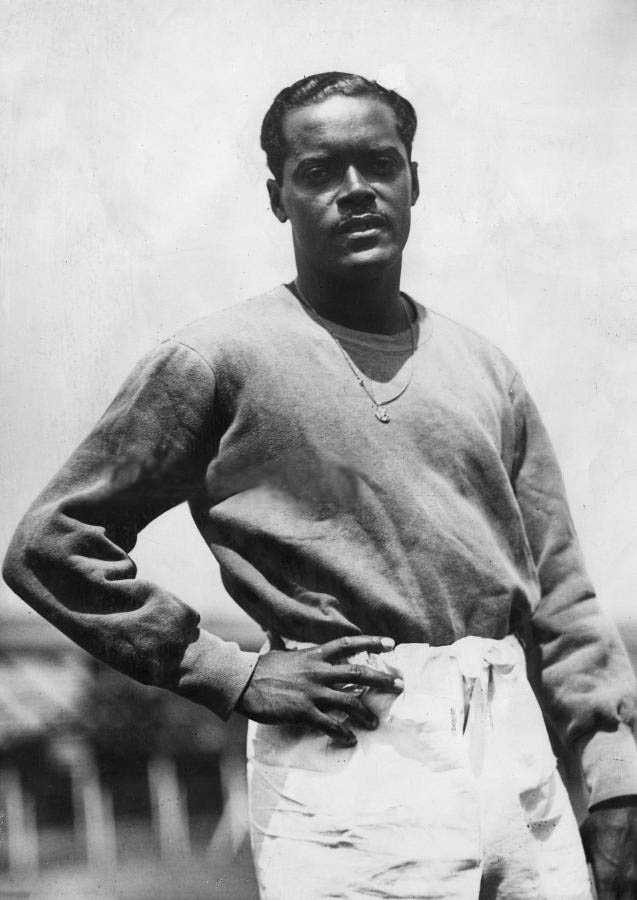
- Leônidas in 1940

Personal information
- Full name: Leônidas da Silva
- Date of birth: 6 September 1913
- Place of birth: Rio de Janeiro, Brazil
- Date of death: 24 January 2004 (aged 90)
- Place of death: Cotia, Brazil
- Height: 1.68 m (5 ft 6 in)
- Position: Centre forward

Youth career
- 1927–1929: São Cristóvão
- 1929–1930: Syrio e Libanez

Senior career*
Years	Team	Apps	(Gls)
1930	Syrio e Libanez	5	(5)
1931–1932	Bonsucesso	39	(23)
1933	Peñarol	16	(11)
1934	Vasco da Gama	4	(1)
1935–1936	Botafogo	19	(8)
1936–1942	Flamengo	88	(89)
1943–1950	São Paulo	120	(93)
Total		291	(230)

International career
1932–1946	Brazil	19	(21)
Medal record
Representing Brazil
FIFA World Cup
Third place	1938 France
- * Club domestic league appearances and goals

Leônidas da Silva (Portuguese pronunciation: [leˈõnidɐz dɐ ˈsiwvɐ]; 6 September 1913 – 24 January 2004) was a Brazilian professional footballer who played as a forward. He is regarded as one of the most important players of the first half of the 20th century. At the height of his career, Leônidas was very popular amongst the people of Brazil and Rio de Janeiro. Leônidas played for the Brazil national team in the 1934 and 1938 World Cups, and was the top scorer of the latter tournament. He was known as the "Black Diamond" and the "Rubber Man" due to his agility.

== Club career ==
Leônidas started his career at São Cristóvão. He then played for Carioca side Sírio e Libanez, where he was coached by Gentil Cardoso. When Cardoso left to coach Bonsucesso, he brought Leônidas with him. Between 1931 and 1932, he played for Bonsucesso before joining Peñarol in Uruguay in 1933. After one year, Leônidas returned to Brazil to play for Vasco da Gama. He helped them win the Rio State Championship. After playing in the 1934 World Cup, he joined Botafogo and won another Rio State Championship in 1935. The following year, he joined Flamengo, where he stayed until 1941. Once again, in 1939, the team won the Rio State Championship. He was also at the forefront of the movement against prejudice in football, being one of the first black players to join the then-elitist Flamengo team. Leônidas joined São Paulo in 1942 and stayed at the club until his retirement from playing in 1950.

=== Bicycle kick ===
Leônidas is one of several possible players credited for inventing the "Bicycle kick". The first time Leônidas used this technique was on 24 April 1932, in a match between Bonsucesso and Carioca. In Flamengo he used this move only once, in 1939, against the Argentinian team Independiente. The unusual volley gained huge fame at the time, propelling it into the football mainstream. For São Paulo, Leônidas used the bicycle kick on two occasions: the first on 14 June 1942 in the defeat against Palestra Italia (currently Palmeiras). Most famously of all, he used it on 13 November 1948 in the massive 8–0 victory over Juventus. The play and the goal was captured in an image, and is regarded as the most famous picture of the player.. In the 1938 World Cup, he also used the bicycle kick, to the delight of the spectators. When he did it, the referee was so shocked by the volley that he was unsure whether it was within the rules or not.

== International career ==
Leônidas played 19 times for the Brazil national team between 1932 and 1946, scoring 21 goals in total, and scoring twice on his debut. In 1938, he was the World Cup's top scorer with 7 goals, scoring at least three times in the 6–5 extra time win over Poland. (Note: Some sources claimed that Leônidas scored only three goals in the victory over Poland instead of the often quoted four. According to Polish experts, Brazil's six goals were scored by: Leônidas (18th, 93rd and 104th minutes), Romeu Pellicciari (25th minute) and José Perácio (44th and 71st minute). This is now recognised by the RSSSF and also FIFA itself. In November 2006, FIFA also confirmed that he scored only once in the quarter-final replay against Czechoslovakia, not twice as FIFA had originally recorded. This means he finished as the top goal scorer of the tournament with an official tally of 7 goals.) Nevertheless, his performance also made him be frequently fouled by the Poles. For the next match, against Czechoslovakia, he was not in the ideal conditions, but the Brazilian staff, concerned for possible punishment in using Niginho in Leônidas place, preferred to keep Leônidas in the team; the Italian Football Federation had warned FIFA about Niginho's irregular condition: this player, who had Italian citizenship, was still legally attached to Lazio, the club he left without permission in 1936, due to fear of being recruited by the Italian Army to the Second Italo-Ethiopian War. Leônidas managed to score against the Czechs, but his injuries got worse, making him definitely unable to be used in the next game – the semifinal against Italy. Brazil lost the match 2–1 and for many years the coach Adhemar Pimenta was criticized as many fans, not aware of Lêonidas true poor conditions, believed his absence was just an option arrogantly made by Pimenta "to rest the player for the final". This version still circulates, despite the fact that Leônidas had written a letter, which was published by certain newspapers at the time, in which he clarified that Pimenta had no choice but to rest him due to the Niginho affair. The Niginho affair also prevented either of the players from playing in the semi-final. In their place, Romeu was chosen as the team's improvised center-forward for the match, scoring Brazil's goal late in the game. Leônidas returned for the third place match and scored two more goals in a 4–2 win against Sweden.

=== 1934 World Cup statistics ===
The scores contain links to the article on the 1934 FIFA World Cup and the round in question. The matches' numbers reflect the number of World Cup matches Leônidas played during his career.

Game no.	Round	Date	Opponent	Score	Leônidas' goals	Times	Leônidas' playing time	Notes	Venue	Report
1	1st R.	27 May 1934	Spain	1–3 (0–3)	1	55'	90 min.		Stadio Luigi Ferraris, Genoa	

=== 1938 World Cup statistics ===
The scores contain links to the article on the 1938 FIFA World Cup and the round in question. When there is a special article on the match in question, the link is in the column for round.

Game no.	Round	Date	Opponent	Score	Leônidas' goals	Times	Leônidas' playing time	Notes	Venue	Report
2	1st R.	5 June 1938	Poland	6–5 a.e.t. (4–4) (3–1)	3	18' 93' 104'	120 min.		Stade de la Meinau, Strasbourg	
3	QF	12 June 1938	Czechoslovakia	1–1 a.e.t. (1–1) (1–0)	1	30'	120 min.		Parc Lescure, Bordeaux	
4	Replay	14 June 1938	Czechoslovakia	2–1 (0–1)	1	57'	90 min.		Parc Lescure, Bordeaux	
–	SF	16 June 1938	Italy	1–2 (0–0)	0		Did not play	Injured	Stade Vélodrome, Marseille	
5	3rd pl.	19 June 1938	Sweden	4–2 (1–2)	2	63' 74'	90 min.		Parc Lescure, Bordeaux	

== Personal life ==
At the height of his career, Leônidas was very popular amongst the people of Brazil and Rio de Janeiro. In the 1930s and 1940s, Leônidas was a celebrity against the backdrop of controversy and racial discrimination looming within Brazil during this time. Leônidas had a major impact on and off the field because of his ability to relate to the working classes of Brazil, and his humble beginnings and racial representation led to this national popularity. When his team won the Brazilian Club Championship in 1931, the people of Rio de Janeiro greeted Leônidas and his team in the streets of the city with cheerful crowds dancing and celebrating their victory.

Historically, Leônidas is well known for his contributions to the relationship between consumerism and the business side of football within the country of Brazil. In the year 1938, Leônidas especially gained massive popularity after his appearance in the World Cup tournament and it was around this time he started to receive numerous advertisement offers, such as for watches and cigarettes. His willingness to participate in interviews and being a constant within the public eye helped his fans feel personally connected to Leônidas. Later that same year, a voting popularity contest was held including Leônidas and he received 249,080 votes in his favor, thus winning the contest.

During the 1938 World Cup, Leônidas was nicknamed "Black Diamond" (Diamante Negro). In the next year, Brazilian chocolate manufacturer Lacta purchased from him the right to name a chocolate bar as Diamante Negro. This chocolate brand became a commercial success in Brazil. Leônidas joined São Paulo as manager the 1950s before leaving football to become a radio reporter and then the owner of a furniture store in São Paulo. He died in Cotia, São Paulo, in 2004, due to complications due to Alzheimer's disease, from which he had been suffering since 1974. He is buried in the Cemitério da Paz of São Paulo.

== Honours ==
Vasco da Gama

- Campeonato Carioca: 1934

Botafogo

- Campeonato Carioca: 1935

Flamengo

- Campeonato Carioca: 1939
- Torneio Rio–São Paulo: 1940

São Paulo

- Campeonato Paulista: 1943, 1945, 1946, 1948, 1949

Rio de Janeiro State Team

- Campeonato Brasileiro de Seleções Estaduais: 1931, 1938, 1940

São Paulo State Team

- Campeonato Brasileiro de Seleções Estaduais: 1942

Brazil

- FIFA World Cup: third-place 1938
- Copa América runner-up: 1946

Individual

- FIFA World Cup Golden Boot: 1938
- FIFA World Cup Golden Ball: 1938
- FIFA World Cup All-Star Team: 1938
- IFFHS Brazilian Player of the 20th Century (8th place)

== See also ==
- List of FIFA World Cup top goalscorers
