= Associação Atlética Ponte Preta =

Brazilian association football club

Ponte Preta
- Full name: Associação Atlética Ponte Preta
- Nicknames: Ponte; Macaca (Monkey); Alvinegra de Campinas (Campinas' White and Black); A Veterana (The Veteran)
- Founded: August 11, 1900; 126 years ago
- Ground: Moisés Lucarelli
- Capacity: 19,722
- President: Marco Antonio Eberlin
- Head coach: Gilson Kleina
- League: Campeonato Brasileiro Série B Campeonato Paulista
- 2025 2025: Série C, 1st of 20 (champions); Paulista, 9th of 16
- Website: pontepreta.com.br
Home colors	Away colors

Associação Atlética Ponte Preta (Brazilian Portuguese pronunciation: [asosjaˈsɐ̃w aˈtlɛtʃikɐ ˈpõtʃi ˈpɾetɐ]), commonly referred to as Ponte Preta or just Ponte, is a Brazilian association football club based in Campinas, São Paulo state. Ponte currently plays in the Série C, the third tier of Brazilian football, as well as in the Campeonato Paulista Série A1, the top tier of the São Paulo state football league.

Founded on August 11, 1900, Ponte Preta is the second-oldest football club established in Brazil still in activity, with the oldest being Sport Club Rio Grande in Rio Grande, Rio Grande do Sul. They are also one of the first to use black players, leading to their nickname Macaca (lit. [female] monkey).

Ponte's biggest rival is Guarani. Matches involving the two clubs, falling under the name Derby Campineiro and first played on March 24, 1912, are usually preceded by days of provocations and sometimes fights in Campinas.

== History ==
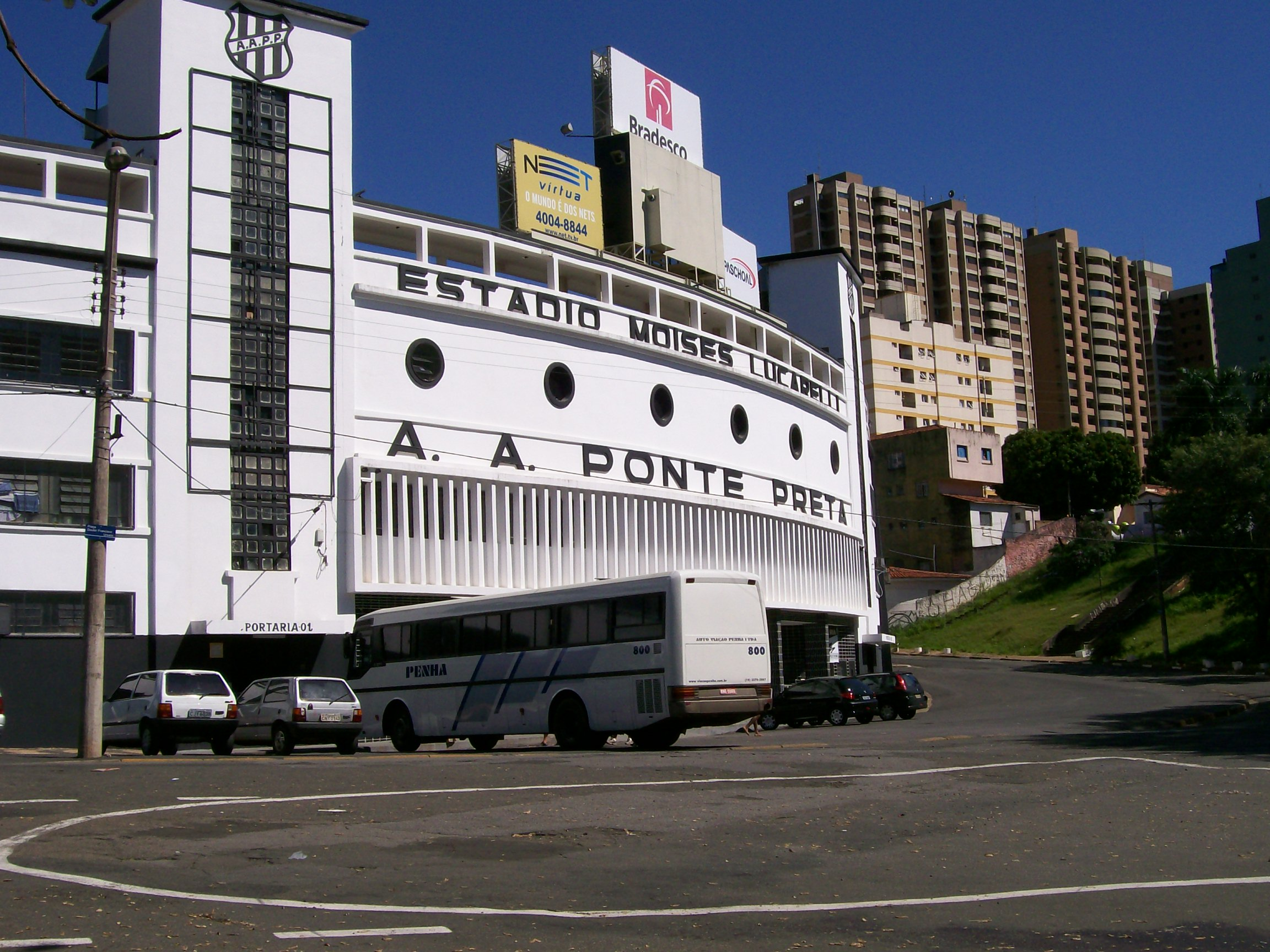
Estádio Moisés Lucarelli

Ponte Preta was founded on August 11, 1900, by Colégio Culto à Ciência students Miguel do Carmo (nicknamed "Migué"), Luiz Garibaldi Burghi, (nicknamed "Gigette") and Antonio de Oliveira (nicknamed "Tonico Campeão"), nearby a black painted wood railroad bridge, hence the name Ponte Preta (lit. "black bridge"). The team's first president was Pedro Vieira da Silva.

Ponte Preta's history is directly intertwined with the railroad business that was flourishing in its city of Campinas. Most of the people involved with the foundation of the team were residents of the working-class neighbourhood by the railroad. One of the team's first nicknames was the "Train of August 11th". Ponte's stadium, the Estádio Moisés Lucarelli, is located right by the railroad in a way where it is possible to see it when inside the stadium, and according to the fans, when the train passes by during a game, it is a sign of good luck to come for the team.

Ponte Preta is recognized, by FIFA, as one of the first teams in the Americas to accept black players, since its foundation in 1900. The club claims to be the first football team ever to have a black player in their roster, that player being the before mentioned Miguel do Carmo, who was part of their first squad. It is also the first countryside team to play a national competition, in 1970.

Pelé's last match in Brazil was against Ponte Preta. On September 2, 1974, at Vila Belmiro stadium, Santos defeated Ponte Preta 2–0.

Ponte Preta lost the Campeonato Paulista final to Corinthians in 1977 in a controversial game that ended in a 2–1 final score. Rui Rey, an important piece of the Ponte Preta team, was shown a red card early in the game. Ponte Preta were considered the favorites for the championship that year.

On November 27, 2013, at the Romildo Ferreira stadium, Ponte Preta reached the 2013 Sudamericana final by defeating São Paulo (4–2 on aggregate) in the semi-finals. It was a historical time for the club, which was playing its first international cup. The final was against Lanús, a traditional Argentine team, with Ponte Preta finishing as runner-up.

In 2025, Ponte Preta won its first national championship, the Campeonato Brasileiro Série C against Londrina. The first game was 0-0, and the second was 2-0 for Ponte Preta.

== Honours ==
=== Official tournaments ===
National
Competitions	Titles	Seasons
Campeonato Brasileiro Série C	1	2025
State
Competitions	Titles	Seasons
Campeonato Paulista Série A2	4	1927, 1933, 1969, 2023

=== Others tournaments ===
==== State ====
- Campeonato Paulista do Interior (4): 2009, 2013, 2015, 2018

==== City ====
- Campeonato Campineiro (10): 1912, 1931, 1935, 1936, 1937, 1940, 1944, 1947, 1948, 1951
- Torneio Taça Cidade de Campinas (2): 1949, 1951

=== Runners-up ===
- Copa Sudamericana (1): 2013
- Campeonato Brasileiro Série B (2): 1997, 2014
- Campeonato Paulista (7): 1929, 1970, 1977, 1979, 1981, 2008, 2017
- Campeonato Paulista Série A2 (6): 1932, 1945, 1961, 1964, 1989, 1999

=== Youth team ===
- Copa São Paulo de Futebol Júnior (2): 1981, 1982

== Achievements ==
- 1912: Champions – Liga Campineira de Futebol
- 1928: Champions – Campeonato Paulista da Divisão Principal – 2º quadro (L.A.F.)
- 1929: Champions – Campeonato Paulista da Divisão Principal – 2º quadro (L.A.F.)
- 1951: Champions – State Amateur Championship (45 games unbeaten)
- 1969: Champions – Campeonato Paulista – Divisão de Accesso
- 1970: Runner-up Campeonato Paulista
- 1977: Runner-up Campeonato Paulista
- 1979: Runner-up Campeonato Paulista
- 1981: Champions – Campeonato Paulista Championship First Stage
- 1981: Runner-up – Campeonato Paulista
- 1981: Third place – Campeonato Brasileiro Série A
- 1981: Champions – Copa São Paulo de Juniores
- 1982: Champions – Copa São Paulo de Juniores
- 1991: Champions – Campeonato Paulista de Aspirantes
- 1992: Runner-up Campeonato Paulista – Série A2
- 1995: Runner-up Copa São Paulo de Juniores
- 1997: Runner-up – Brazilian Championship – Série B
- 1998: Runner-up Copa São Paulo de Juniores
- 1999: Runner-up – Campeonato Paulista Série A2
- 2001: Third place – Copa do Brasil
- 2008: Runner-up – Campeonato Paulista
- 2009: Champions – Campeonato Paulista do Interior
- 2013: Champions – Campeonato Paulista do Interior
- 2013: Runner-up – Copa Sudamericana
- 2014: Runner-up – Campeonato Brasileiro Série B
- 2015: Champions – Campeonato Paulista do Interior
- 2017: Runner-up – Campeonato Paulista
- 2023: Champions- Campeonato Paulista A2
- 2025: Champions - Campeonato Brasileiro Série C

== Stadium ==
Ponte Preta's stadium is Estádio Moisés Lucarelli, also known as "Majestoso", or "Estádio Majestoso" (Portuguese for Majestic Stadium), built in 1948, by its own fan's material and work.

Its maximum capacity is of 19,722 people, nowadays. The biggest public in it was in a State's Championship in 1970, against Santos, with an official public of 33,000, but it is said that there were about 40,000 people, as the gates were broken down.

Its nickname is "Majestoso", meaning the "Majestic One" because it was the third largest stadium in Brazil at the time of its inauguration (only smaller than Pacaembu, in São Paulo and São Januário, in Rio de Janeiro).

In Majestoso's entrance hall there is a bust of the stadium's founder, Moisés Lucarelli (after whom the venue is named) facing the outside. In 2000, after a long series of defeats some superstitious fans argued that the founder ought to see the team playing and the bust was rotated 180 degrees. As the team's performance did not improve noticeably, the statue was put back in its original position.

== Supporters ==
Ponte Preta supporters are known as "pontepretanos". A club from Maceió, Alagoas, adopted a similar name, as does a Norwegian futsal team.

== Symbols ==
Ponte Preta's mascot is a female monkey (macaca) wearing the club's home kit. It was initially intended as a derogatory term, reflecting the fact that Ponte was one of the first Brazilian football clubs to use black players, who had been refused participation in prior championships. This practice of using slurs as a distinction was also used by Palmeiras, who adopted the pig (porco) as their mascot.

== Ultras ==
- Torcida Jovem
- Serponte

== Bola de Prata inductees ==
- 1977 – (Brazil) Oscar and (Brazil) Polozzi (defenders)
- 1978 – (Brazil) Odirlei (defender)
- 1980 – (Brazil) Carlos Gallo (goalkeeper)
- 1981 – (Brazil) Zé Mario (defensive midfielder)
- 1982 – (Brazil) Carlos Gallo (goalkeeper) and (Brazil) Juninho Fonseca (defender)
- 2000 – (Brazil) Mineiro (defensive midfielder)

== Basketball ==
Ponte Preta had one of the best women's basketball rosters in early 1990s Brazil, winning the World Club Championship twice.

== Current squad ==
As of 3 August 2026

Note: Flags indicate national team as defined under FIFA eligibility rules; some limited exceptions apply. Players may hold more than one non-FIFA nationality.

No.	Pos.	Nation	Player
1	GK	BRA	Guilherme Viana
2	DF	BRA	Júlio
3	DF	BRA	Lucas Cunha (on loan from Red Bull Bragantino)
4	DF	BRA	Diego Leão
5	MF	BRA	Rodrigo Souza
6	DF	BRA	Jota
7	FW	BRA	Emanuell Ferreira
8	MF	BRA	André Lima
9	FW	BRA	Brandão (on loan from Coritiba)
10	MF	BRA	Élvis
13	DF	BRA	Diego Porfírio (on loan from Pouso Alegre)
14	DF	BRA	Danilo Barcelos
15	DF	BRA	Gabriel Caran (on loan from Boavista)
16	MF	BRA	Karl (on loan from Boavista)
17	MF	BRA	Miguel Morais

No.	Pos.	Nation	Player
18	FW	BRA	David da Hora (on loan from Coritiba)
19	FW	BRA	Jonathan Cafú
20	MF	BRA	Murilo Cavalcante
21	FW	BRA	Vitor Ribeiro
22	MF	BRA	Denis (on loan from Boavista)
23	DF	COL	Sergio Palacios (on loan from Red Bull Bragantino)
30	GK	BRA	Vinicius Ferrari
32	DF	BRA	Kevyson (on loan from Santos)
35	MF	BRA	Gustavo Telles
44	DF	BRA	Gustavo Almeida
-	GK	BRA	José Luiz
-	DF	BRA	Di Mauro (on loan from Boavista)
-	DF	BRA	Guilherme Martins
-	FW	BRA	Danilo Peu

=== Out on loan ===
Note: Flags indicate national team as defined under FIFA eligibility rules; some limited exceptions apply. Players may hold more than one non-FIFA nationality.

No.	Pos.	Nation	Player
—	MF	BRA	Nikolas (at América Mineiro until 31 January 2027)

== Head coaches ==
- (Brazil) Abel Braga (January 1, 2003 – December 31, 2003)
- (Brazil) Estevam Soares (January 2, 2004 – May 24, 2004)
- (Brazil) Vadão (January 1, 2005 – May 22, 2005)
- (Brazil) Zetti (August 2, 2005 – August 23, 2005)
- (Brazil) Estevam Soares (August 26, 2005 – November 22, 2005)
- (Brazil) Vadão (December 15, 2005 – May 29, 2006)
- (Brazil) Marco Aurélio (May 19, 2006 – October 5, 2006)
- (Brazil) Nelsinho Baptista (January 30, 2007 – September 23, 2007)
- (Brazil) Paulo Comelli (September 24, 2007 – December 3, 2007)
- (Brazil) Sérgio Guedes (2008)
- (Brazil) Paulo Bonamigo (June 11, 2008 – September 27, 2008)
- (Brazil) Vágner Benazzi (October 1, 2008 – December 4, 2008)
- (Brazil) Sérgio Soares (December 4, 2008–11 March 22, 2009)
- (Brazil) Marco Aurélio (March 9, 2009 – May 25, 2009)
- (Brazil) Pintado (May 25, 2009 – August 30, 2009)
- (Brazil) Márcio Bittencourt (August 31, 2009 – October 7, 2009)
- (Brazil) Sérgio Guedes (January 1, 2010 – March 31, 2010)
- (Brazil) Jorginho (April 21, 2010 – October 25, 2010)
- (Brazil) Givanildo Oliveira (October 25, 2010 – December 2, 2010)
- (Brazil) Gilson Kleina (December 3, 2010 – September 18, 2012)
- (Brazil) Guto Ferreira (September 22, 2012 – June 6, 2013)
- (Brazil) Paulo César Carpegiani (June 15, 2013 – August 24, 2013)
- (Brazil) Jorginho (August 25, 2013 – December 13, 2013)
- (Brazil) Sidney Moraes (December 15, 2013 – January 30, 2014)
- (Brazil) Vadão (January 31, 2014 – May 13, 2014)
- (Brazil) Dado Cavalcanti (May 13, 2014 – July 21, 2014)
- (Brazil) Guto Ferreira (2014–2015)
- (Brazil) Doriva (2015)
- (Brazil) Vinícius Eutrópio (2016)
- (Brazil) Gilson Kleina (2017)
- (Brazil) Eduardo Baptista (2017–2018)
- (Brazil) Marcelo Chamusca (2018)
- (Brazil) Jorginho (2019)
- (Brazil) Gilson Kleina (2019–2020)
- (Brazil) João Brigatti (2020)
- (Brazil) Marcelo Oliveira (2020)
- (Brazil) Fábio Moreno (2020–2021)
- (Brazil) Gilson Kleina (2021–2022)
- (Brazil) Hélio dos Anjos (2022–2023)
- (Brazil) Felipe Moreira (2023)
- (Brazil) Pintado (2023)
- (Brazil) João Brigatti (2023 – May 27, 2024)
- (Brazil) Nelsinho Baptista (May 29, 2024 – October 21, 2024)
- (Brazil) João Brigatti (November 10, 2024 – November 22, 2024)
- (Brazil) Alberto Valentim (November 26, 2024 – August 11, 2025)
- (Brazil) Marcelo Fernandes (August 12, 2025 – February 15, 2026)
- (Brazil) Rodrigo Santana (February 22, 2026 – )

== See also ==
- Ponte Preta Sumaré Futebol Clube
