= 1940 in Brazilian football =

Football in Brazil
- Season: 1940

The following article presents a summary of the 1940 football (soccer) season in Brazil, which was the 39th season of competitive football in the country.

== Torneio Rio-São Paulo ==
Final Standings

Position	Team	Points	Played	Won	For	Against	Difference
1	Flamengo	13	8	6	30	12	8
2	Fluminense	13	8	5	25	15	10
3	Corinthians	9	8	4	19	15	4
4	Palestra Itália	8	8	3	22	19	3
5	Portuguesa	7	8	3	13	23	-10
6	Botafogo	6	8	2	25	25	0
7	Vasco da Gama	6	8	2	17	19	-2
8	América	6	8	2	15	25	-10
9	São Paulo	4	8	1	11	24	-13

The 1940 Torneio Rio-São Paulo was not concluded, thus no club was declared as the competition champion.

== Campeonato Paulista ==
Final Standings

Position	Team	Points	Played	Won	Drawn	Lost	For	Against	Difference
1	Palestra Itália-SP	33	20	15	3	2	53	19	34
2	Portuguesa	30	20	13	4	3	46	24	22
3	Ypiranga-SP	27	20	13	1	6	56	37	19
4	Corinthians	26	20	12	2	6	54	31	23
5	Portuguesa Santista	25	20	11	3	6	53	40	13
6	São Paulo	19	20	9	1	10	42	41	1
7	Santos	18	20	7	4	9	51	49	2
8	São Paulo Railway	16	20	5	6	9	44	50	-6
9	Hespanha	10	20	5	0	15	25	47	-22
10	Comercial-SP	9	20	3	3	14	25	72	-47
11	Juventus	7	20	3	1	16	29	68	-39

Palestra Itália-SP declared as the Campeonato Paulista champions.

== State championship champions ==
State	Champion	State	Champion
Acre	-	Paraíba	Treze
Alagoas	CRB	Paraná	Atlético Paranaense
Amapá	-	Pernambuco	Santa Cruz
Amazonas	Rio Negro	Piauí	-
Bahia	Bahia	Rio de Janeiro	Goytacaz and unknown (shared)
Ceará	Tramways-CE	Rio de Janeiro (DF)	Fluminense
Espírito Santo	Americano-ES	Rio Grande do Norte	ABC
Goiás	-	Rio Grande do Sul	Internacional
Maranhão	Sampaio Corrêa	Rondônia	-
Mato Grosso	-	Santa Catarina	Ypiranga-SC
Minas Gerais	Palestra Itália-MG	São Paulo	Palestra Itália-SP
Pará	Remo	Sergipe	Sergipe

== Other competition champions ==
Competition	Champion
Campeonato Brasileiro de Seleções Estaduais	Rio de Janeiro (DF)

== Brazil national team ==
The following table lists all the games played by the Brazil national football team in official competitions and friendly matches during 1940.

Date	Opposition	Result	Score	Brazil scorers	Competition
February 18, 1940	Argentina	D	2-2	Leônidas da Silva (2)	Roca Cup
February 25, 1940	Argentina	L	0-3	-	Roca Cup
March 5, 1940	Argentina	L	1-6	Jair da Rosa Pinto	Roca Cup
March 10, 1940	Argentina	W	3-2	Hércules (2), Leônidas da Silva	Roca Cup
March 17, 1940	Argentina	L	1-5	Leônidas da Silva	Roca Cup
March 24, 1940	Uruguay	L	3-4	Pedro Amorim, Hércules, Leônidas da Silva	Copa Rio Branco
March 31, 1940	Uruguay	D	1-1	Leônidas da Silva	Copa Rio Branco
