= Figueirense FC =

Brazilian association football club based in Florianópolis, Santa Catarina, Brazil

Figueirense
- Full name: Figueirense Futebol Clube
- Nicknames: Figueira (Fig Tree); Furacão (Hurricane); Gigante do Estreito (Strait's Giant); Alvinegro (White and Black)
- Founded: 12 June 1921; 105 years ago
- Ground: Orlando Scarpelli
- Capacity: 19,584
- President: Eduardo Philippi Mafra
- Head coach: Raul Cabral
- League: Campeonato Brasileiro Série C Campeonato Catarinense
- 2025 2025: Série C, 14th of 20; Catarinense, 7th of 12
- Website: figueirense.com.br
Home colours	Away colours	Third colours

Figueirense Futebol Clube, commonly referred to as Figueirense, is a Brazilian professional club based in Florianópolis, Santa Catarina founded on 12 June 1921. It competes in the Campeonato Brasileiro Série C, the third tier of Brazilian football, as well as in the Campeonato Catarinense, the top flight of the Santa Catarina state football league.

== History ==
The club was founded as Figueirense Football Club on 12 June 1921. The club is named Figueirense after the neighborhood where it is located, in Centro neighborhood. Figueirense means "from Figueira". Figueirense was one of the founders of the defunct Liga Catharinense de Desportos Terrestres, organized on 12 April 1923. In 1932 the team won their first state championship. From 1935 to 1937 Figueirense was three times in a row Catarinense champion. In 1939, Figueirense won again the state championship, that was end of the Golden Decade of the club.

1972 was the end of the 30-year state championship titleless period. In 1973, Figueirense was the first team of Santa Catarina state in Campeonato Brasileiro Série A. In 1974 the team won Catarinense again.

In 1994 the 17-year state championship titleless period ended. In 1995, Figeirense was Torneio Mercosul champion (not to be confused with Copa Mercosur) at Santa Catarina. It was the club's first (and only) international title.

In 2001 the club was Campeonato Brasileiro Second Division runner-up, and was promoted to the following year's First Division. From 2002 to 2004, Figueirense was three times in a row Campeonato Catarinense champion. In 2008, Figueirense won the Copa São Paulo de Juniores for the first time after beating Rio Branco-SP 2–0 in the final. In the 2008 edition of Serie A, Figueirense finished in 17th place, being relegated to Serie B the following year.

In 2002 Rivaldo's and César Sampaio's company, called CSR Esporte & Marketing, and Figueirense signed a partnership. The company was responsible for the administration of the professional football of Figueirense. The partnership ended in 2004.

Some famous players who have played for Figueirense in the last decade are Edmundo, Loco Abreu, André Santos, Roberto Firmino, Filipe Luís, Cleiton Xavier, Felipe Santana and Michel Bastos.

In 2026 Figueirense had a dismal campaign in Campeonato Catarinense, with only 4 wins across the 2 phases of the competition. The club was relegated for the second time in its history to Campeonato Catarinense Série B in the sixth and last round of the relegation quadrangular, after losing to Carlos Renaux 4–2 on Estádio Orlando Scarpelli, even entering the module with an extra point for being the best fifth-placed team in the championship.

== Rivals ==
Figueirense's greatest rival is Avaí.

== Players ==
=== First team squad ===
As of 16 November 2026.

Note: Flags indicate national team as defined under FIFA eligibility rules; some limited exceptions apply. Players may hold more than one non-FIFA nationality.

No.	Pos.	Nation	Player
—	GK	BRA	Fabrício
—	GK	BRA	Antônio
—	GK	BRA	Vinícius Barreta
—	GK	BRA	Igo Gabriel
—	DF	BRA	Zé Luiz
—	DF	BRA	Jhonnathan
—	DF	BRA	Léo Maia
—	DF	BRA	Arthur Henrique
—	DF	BRA	Wesley Costa

No.	Pos.	Nation	Player
—	MF	BRA	Breno
—	MF	BRA	Léo Renz
—	MF	BRA	Flávio
—	MF	BRA	Pedro Melo
—	MF	BRA	Nicolas Porto
—	FW	BRA	Arthur Martins
—	FW	BRA	Thyerry

=== Reserve team ===
Note: Flags indicate national team as defined under FIFA eligibility rules; some limited exceptions apply. Players may hold more than one non-FIFA nationality.

No.	Pos.	Nation	Player
—	DF	BRA	Jhonathan Reis
—	DF	BRA	Dedé
—	MF	BRA	Fernando
—	MF	BRA	Gabriel Asaph
—	FW	BRA	Wendel
—	FW	BRA	Matheus Borba
—	FW	BRA	Gabriel Morais

=== Out on loan ===
Note: Flags indicate national team as defined under FIFA eligibility rules; some limited exceptions apply. Players may hold more than one non-FIFA nationality.

No.	Pos.	Nation	Player
—	FW	BRA	Maiky (at Al Granada until 31 January 2027)

== First-team staff ==
Role	Name
First Team Coach	(Brazil) —

== Stadium ==
Figueirense's stadium is Estádio Orlando Scarpelli, built-in 1961, with a maximum capacity of 19,584 people. In 2005, Orlando Scarpelli became an all-seater stadium.

== Honours ==
=== Official tournaments ===
State
Competitions	Titles	Seasons
Campeonato Catarinense	18	1932, 1935, 1936, 1937, 1939, 1941, 1972, 1974, 1994, 1999, 2002, 2003, 2004, 2006, 2008, 2014, 2015, 2018
Copa Santa Catarina	4	1990, 1996, 2021, 2025
Recopa Catarinense	2^{s}	2019, 2022

- record
- ^{S} shared record

=== Others tournaments ===
==== International ====
- Torneio Mercosul (1): 1995

==== Inter-state ====
- Torneio cidade de Florianópolis (3): 1921, 1922, 1923
- Torneio de Paranaguá (1): 1951

==== State ====
- Supercampeonato Catarinense (1): 1996
- Taça Santa Catarina (1): 1986
- Torneio Início do Campeonato Catarinense (1): 1924

==== City ====
- Campeonato Citadino de Florianópolis (13): 1932, 1933, 1935, 1936, 1937, 1939, 1941, 1950, 1954, 1955, 1958, 1959, 1965
- Torneio Início de Florianópolis (15): 1921, 1922, 1923, 1924, 1927, 1932, 1941, 1947, 1948, 1949, 1950, 1951, 1959, 1961, 1962

=== Runners-up ===
- Copa do Brasil (1): 2007
- Campeonato Brasileiro Série B (2): 2001, 2010
- Campeonato Catarinense (7): 1950, 1975, 1979, 1983, 1984, 1993, 2012
- Copa Santa Catarina (2): 1991, 1993
- Recopa Catarinense (1): 2026
- Campeonato Catarinense Série B (1): 1987

=== Youth team ===
- Copa São Paulo de Futebol Júnior (1): 2008

== Managers ==
Period	Name
1985	(Brazil) Zé Mário
1999	(Brazil) Cassiá
2000–2001	(Brazil) Valmir Louruz
2001	(Brazil) Roberval Davino
2002	(Brazil) Cabralzinho
2002	(Brazil) Muricy Ramalho
2003–2004	(Brazil) Dorival Júnior
2004–2005	(Brazil) Paulo Comelli
2005	(Brazil) Marco Aurélio
2005	(Brazil) Zé Mário
2005–2006	(Brazil) Adílson Batista
2006	(Brazil) Waldemar Lemos
2006–2007	(Brazil) Heriberto da Cunha
2007	(Brazil) Mário Sérgio
2007–2008	(Brazil) Alexandre Gallo
2008	(Brazil) Guilherme Macuglia

Period	Name
2008	(Brazil) Mário Sérgio
2008–2009	(Brazil) Pintado
2009	(Brazil) Roberto Fernandes
2009	(Brazil) Márcio Araújo
2010–2011	(Brazil) Márcio Goiano
2011	(Brazil) Jorginho
2012	(Brazil) Branco
2012	(Brazil) Argel Fucks
2012	(Brazil) Hélio dos Anjos
2012	(Brazil) Márcio Goiano
2013	(Brazil) Adílson Batista
2013–2014	(Brazil) Vinícius Eutrópio
2014	(Brazil) Guto Ferreira
2014–2015	(Brazil) Argel Fucks
2015	(Brazil) René Simões
2015–2016	(Brazil) Hudson Coutinho

Period	Name
2016	(Brazil) Vinícius Eutrópio
2016	(Brazil) Argel Fucks
2016	(Brazil) Tuca Guimarães
2016	(Brazil) Marquinhos Santos
2017	(Brazil) Márcio Goiano
2017	(Brazil) Marcelo Cabo
2017–2018	(Brazil) Milton Cruz
2018	(Brazil) Rogério Micale
2018–2019	(Brazil) Hemerson Maria
2019	(Brazil) Vinícius Eutrópio
2019	(Brazil) Pintado
2019–2020	(Brazil) Márcio Coelho
2020	(Brazil) Elano
2020–2021	(Brazil) Jorginho
2021–2022	(Brazil) Júnior Rocha
2023	(Brazil) Cristóvão Borges

Period	Name
2023	(Brazil) Roberto Fonseca
2023	(Brazil) Paulo Baier
2024	(Brazil) João Burse
2025	(Brazil) Thiago Carvalho
2025	(Brazil) Pintado

== Mascot ==
From 2002 to 2011, Figueirense's mascot was an anthropomorphic fig tree named Figueirinha, which means Little Fig Tree. Since 2012, the mascot is a cyclone shaped creature wearing the club's home kit, it's named Furacão (Hurricane) after one of the team's nicknames.

== National and International competitions record ==
=== First Division (Serie A) ===
Year	Position	Year	Position	Year	Position
1973	35th	2003	11th	2011	7th
1975	21st	2004	11th	2012	20th
1976	45th	2005	16th	2014	13th
1978	55th	2006	7th	2015	16th
1979	46th	2007	13th	2016	18th
2002	17th	2008	17th		

=== Second Division (Serie B) ===
Year	Position	Year	Position
1980	32nd	2009	6th
1985	3rd	2010	2nd
1989	32nd	2013	4th
1989	32nd	2017	12th
1991	34th	2018	15th
2000	9th	2019	16th
2001	2nd	2020	17th

=== Third Division (Serie C) ===
Year	Position
1981	8th
1998	30th
1999	6th
2021	9th
2022	5th
2023	16th

=== Brazilian Cup ===
Year	Position	Year	Position	Year	Position
1995	First round	2004	First round	2016	Third round
1997	Second round	2005	Quarter-finals	2017	First round
1999	First round	2007	Finals (2nd)	2018	Third round
2000	Second round	2009	Second round		
2001	First round	2013	Third round		
2002	Round of 16	2014	Second round		
2003	Round of 16	2015	Quarter-finals		

=== Sudamericana Cup ===
Year	Position	Year	Position
2004	First round	2012	Second round
2007	First round	2016	Second round
