= History of CR Flamengo =

History of Brazilian association football club Clube de Regatas do Flamengo

The history of Clube de Regatas do Flamengo, a Brazilian multi-sport club known for its participation in various disciplines beyond football, began in 1895 when it was founded to compete in rowing in Rio de Janeiro.

== Founding for rowing competitions ==
=== The beginnings ===
In the late 19th century, rowing was a prominent sport in Rio de Janeiro. Football was beginning to appear in some clubs but faced skepticism and lacked widespread acceptance in carioca society. Rowing, however, was a leading sport, with competitions occurring in the mornings and rowing groups active at every beach. At Flamengo Beach, people often engaged in leisurely boat rides in the bay and gathered for conversations at Café Lamas, a well-known restaurant in Largo do Machado.

In September 1895, José Agostinho Pereira da Cunha proposed the creation of a rowing club to Nestor de Barros, Mário Spíndola, and Augusto Lopes da Silveira. The group agreed to the idea, and it gained support among others at Largo do Machado. Establishing a rowing club required a boat, which was a necessary piece of equipment.

A used five-oar whaleboat was available for purchase. Mário Spíndola, Felisberto Laport, Nestor de Barros, José Félix da Cunha Meneses, and José Agostinho Pereira da Cunha contributed four hundred thousand réis to buy the boat, which required extensive repairs to be suitable for the new rowing group.

The boat was named "Pherusa", and a shipwright from Maria Angu was hired for the repairs, which cost two hundred and fifty thousand réis. Those able to contribute funded the work. On 6 October, the group celebrated the completion of the repairs and prepared to retrieve "Pherusa".

A group including Nestor de Barros, José Félix, José Agostinho, Mário Spíndola, Felisberto Laport, Napoleão de Oliveira, Maurício Rodrigues Pereira, and Joaquim Bahia set out to collect the boat. They were pleased to see "Pherusa" in good condition, appearing almost new as it floated in the sea.

After noon, the group departed from Ponta do Caju in the boat, with Mário Spíndola steering. Despite worsening weather, including strong winds and rain, the group continued. However, "Pherusa" capsized during the storm. The crew held onto the boat's remains, and Joaquim Bahia, a skilled swimmer, swam to shore to seek help.

As the weather calmed, a boat from Penha noticed Mário Spíndola's signal—a white flag—and rescued the group. The crew of the "Leal" saved everyone and towed the damaged "Pherusa", which was beyond repair.

The loss of the boat was secondary to concerns for Bahia's safety. After four hours, Bahia reached the shore and was relieved to find his companions safe. Efforts to repair "Pherusa" resumed, but before it could be used in competition, the boat was stolen and never recovered. The group retained memories of "Pherusa" and remained committed to establishing a formal rowing club.

=== The foundation ===
A boat named "Scyra" was acquired. On 17 November 1895, a meeting took place in a hallway at 22 Flamengo Beach, where Nestor de Barros lived in one of the rooms. The space had previously housed "Pherusa" and now held "Scyra". The purpose of the gathering was to formally establish the Flamengo Rowing Group. During this meeting, the first board was elected:

- Domingos Marques de Azevedo; President
- Francisco Lucci Colas; Vice-President
- Nestor de Barros; Secretary
- Felisberto Cardoso Laport; Treasurer

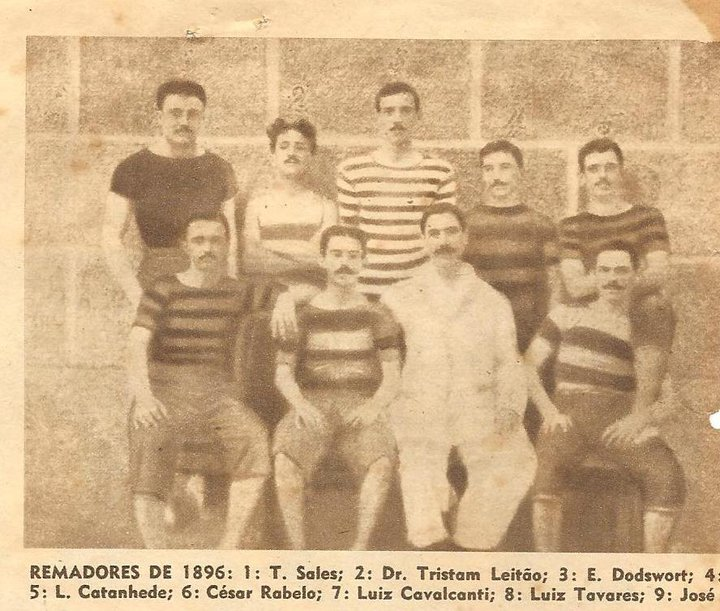
Members of Flamengo's rowing team in 1896.

In addition to the elected board, the following individuals were recognized as founding members: José Agostinho Pereira da Cunha, Napoleão Coelho de Oliveira, Mário Espínola, José Maria Leitão da Cunha, Carlos Sardinha, Maurício Rodrigues Pereira, Desidério Guimarães, Eduardo Sardinha, Emido José Barbosa, José Félix Cunha Meneses, George Leuzinger, Augusto Lopes da Silveira, João de Almeida Lustosa, and José Augusto Chairéo. The latter three were absent from the meeting but were still considered founders. It was decided that the official founding date of the club would be 15 November, a national holiday.

The club initially adopted blue and gold colors in wide horizontal stripes. On 23 November 1896, at the suggestion of Nestor de Barros, the colors were changed to red and black, which remain in use today.

Additional boats were purchased, and Flamengo began to compete successfully. On 5 June 1898, at the First Regatta of the Brazilian Nautical Championship, the club achieved its first victory with "Irerê", a two-oar whaleboat. Prior to this, Flamengo had recorded several minor placings and second-place finishes, earning the nickname "Bronze Club." By 1902, due to its increasing prominence, the group was officially renamed Clube de Regatas do Flamengo.

An interesting note in the history of Clube de Regatas do Flamengo is that its athletes participated in a football match before the formal establishment of the club's football department. On 25 October 1903, Flamengo rowers played a friendly match alongside members of Botafogo.

== Football ==
The Football Department of Clube de Regatas do Flamengo is recognized for its history and prominence.

=== The beginnings ===
Starting in 1902, rowing began to gain public interest alongside football. As a result, some Flamengo members also supported Fluminense for football, while Fluminense supporters joined Flamengo for regattas. Alberto Borgerth represented this overlap, rowing for Flamengo in the mornings and playing football for Fluminense in the afternoons.

In 1911, a disagreement within Fluminense caused several players to leave for Flamengo. On 8 November 1911, an assembly decided to create a land sports department led by Alberto Borgerth. The conflict originated from a dispute involving Oswaldo Gomes and multiple first-team Fluminense players. Initially, joining Botafogo was considered, but this was quickly rejected due to Botafogo's rivalry with Fluminense. Strengthening Paissandu was also suggested but declined, as the club was exclusively English. Ultimately, Borgerth's proposal to establish a football section within Flamengo was approved at the assembly on 8 November.

Flag of Germany used until 1918. Due to Brazil's opposition to the German Empire during World War I, Flamengo discontinued its coral snake shirt, which resembled the flag of the opposing nation.

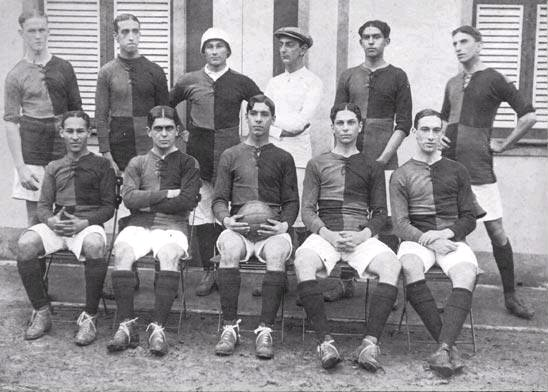
The Flamengo team in 1912 prior to a match against Paissandu.

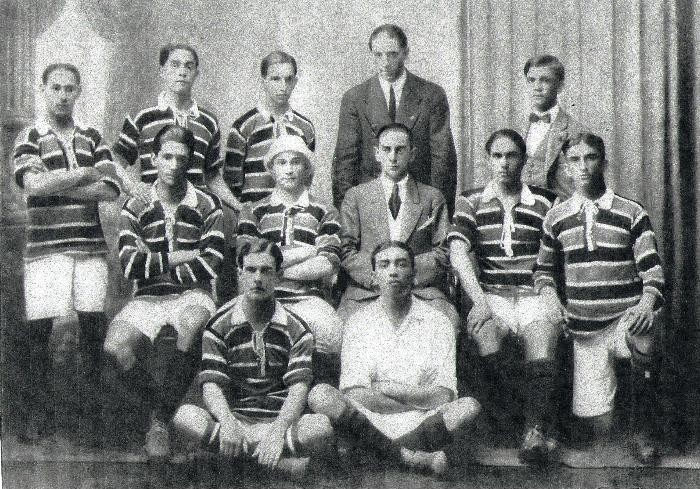
The Flamengo team, winners of the Carioca Championship in 1914.

=== 1912 to 1933: From the first match to the end of amateurism ===
Flamengo conducted its initial training sessions at Russel Beach and officially affiliated with the Metropolitan League of Land Sports on 3 May 1912. On the same day, Flamengo played its first match at America’s field, defeating Mangueira 16–2, though some sources cite a 15–2 score, with Belfort Duarte as the referee. Flamengo's lineup included Baena; Píndaro and Nery; Coriol, Gilberto, and Galo; Baiano, Arnaldo, Amarante, Gustavo, and Borgerth.

In 1912, Flamengo won its first football title, the Carioca Championship Second Division. The team's original uniform, known as "penny parrot," was replaced in 1914 with the coral snake shirt, which was used until 1916. During this period, Flamengo secured its first Carioca Championship title in 1914, followed by another in 1915.

In 1921, Flamengo won its second consecutive Carioca Championship. In 1925, the club achieved six professional football titles: the Carioca Championship, Carioca Second Division Championship, Torre Sport Club-PE Trophy, Agência Hudson-PE Trophy, Jornal do Comércio de Pernambuco-PE Trophy, and Sérgio de Loreto-PE Trophy. In 1927, Flamengo was named "Brazil's most beloved club" and received the Salutaris Trophy after defeating Vasco in a contest organized by Jornal do Brasil. In 1930, Flamengo recorded its lowest football performance to date. In 1933, the team undertook its first international tour and played its last amateur match on 14 May, defeating River 16–2. In 1934, Flamengo won the Extra Tournament.

=== 1934 to 1955: From professional beginnings to the second three-peat ===
In 1934, José Bastos Padilha was elected president of Flamengo, during which time the club increased its social prominence and fanbase. In 1936, players Domingos da Guia and Leônidas da Silva, who later became Brazil's top scorer at the 1938 FIFA World Cup while with Flamengo, joined the team. In 1937, coach Dori Kruschner implemented the WM formation and introduced off-ball training. That same year, a second uniform was introduced to enhance visibility during night matches due to the era's limited lighting conditions. The Carioca championships were unified under the Carioca Football League, with all participating clubs transitioning to professional status. In 1939, Flamengo won the Carioca Championship after a 12-year gap, setting the stage for a state three-peat in the 1940s.

In 1940, Flamengo and Fluminense were tied for first place in the 1940 Rio-São Paulo Tournament. The CBD (Brazilian Sports Confederation) declared the tournament incomplete, with no champion named, as documented by Jornal do Brasil, O Estado de São Paulo, Folha de S.Paulo, and CBD Bulletins (predecessor to the modern CBF). In 1941, Flamengo participated in its first international competition, the Argentine Hexagonal Tournament. In 1942, Brazil's first organized supporters’ group, Charanga Rubro-Negra, was established. In 1943, Flamengo won the Rio de Janeiro Relâmpago Tournament, and in 1944, it achieved its first Carioca three-peat (1942–43–44). In 1946, Zizinho, a notable Brazilian player and Flamengo product, suffered an injury that sidelined him for six months, affecting the team's performance. Zizinho was transferred to Bangu in 1950, a move regarded as one of Flamengo's least favorable transactions. In 1949, Flamengo secured its first international titles, defeating the Guatemala national team to win the Brazilian Embassy Trophy and the National Olympic Committee Trophy in Guatemala. During the 1950s, Flamengo earned additional international titles, including the Lima International Tournament in Peru (1952), the Juan Domingo Perón Trophy in Argentina (1953), the 1954 Rio de Janeiro International Triangular Tournament, and the Gilberto Cardoso Tournament in Rio de Janeiro (1955). In 1955, Flamengo also achieved its second Carioca three-peat.

=== 1956 to 1973: Golden years ===
In 1956, Flamengo secured the Rio-São Paulo State Champions Cup, defeating Santos 2–1. In 1957, Flamengo won the Morumbi International Tournament, organized by São Paulo to mark the opening of the Morumbi Stadium. The tournament included international teams such as Lazio, Sevilla, Dinamo Zagreb, and Belenenses. In 1961, Flamengo won the Uruguay Summer International Tournament, held in Rio de Janeiro, São Paulo, Buenos Aires, and Montevideo, competing against teams including Vasco, Corinthians, São Paulo, River Plate, Boca Juniors, Nacional, and Cerro. That same year, Flamengo also won the 1961 Rio-São Paulo Tournament. In the first phase, in Group B (consisting of Rio de Janeiro teams), Flamengo advanced alongside Botafogo and Vasco. In the second phase, Flamengo remained undefeated and, on 23 April, defeated Corinthians 2–0, with goals scored by Joel and Dida, clinching the title. In 1962, during a European tour, Flamengo won a friendly match against Barcelona 2–0 at the Camp Nou, with both goals scored by Dida. Following the 1955 three-peat, Flamengo's next Carioca titles were in 1963 and 1965. In 1964, Flamengo won the Orange Trophy against Valencia. That same year, Flamengo competed in the 1964 Taça Brasil, an early version of the Brazilian Football Championship, reaching the final after defeating Ceará in the semifinals but losing to Santos, led by Pelé. In 1967, Flamengo defeated Barcelona 1–0 in the semifinals of the Ibérico Trophy but lost the final to Sporting Portugal. In late 1968, Garrincha joined Flamengo, playing 20 matches and scoring 4 goals, with his final game on 12 April 1969. In the 1970s, Flamengo developed a notable team, with players such as Zico, Júnior, Leandro, Andrade, and others joining the professional squad. In 1970, Flamengo won its first Guanabara Cup, the initial round of the state championship. In the first five months of 1971, under Yustrich’s management, Flamengo recorded 8 wins in 28 matches. In 1972, Flamengo won the Guanabara Cup, the Carioca Championship, and the 1972 People's Tournament, which included clubs with significant fanbases, such as Corinthians, Atlético-MG, Internacional, and Bahia. Although not an official CBD tournament, it was organized by Atlético-MG and the participating clubs, gaining attention through media coverage for featuring Brazil's most popular teams.

=== 1974 to 1983: The "Zico era" and golden age ===
In 1974, Zico secured his position as a starter for Flamengo, contributing to the team's state championship victory that year. In 1975, Flamengo won the José João Altafini "Mazolla" Cup, defeating Juventus 2–1 with goals from Doval and Zico.

In 1978, Flamengo claimed the Palma de Mallorca City Trophy, defeating Real Madrid. Despite Zico's absence, Flamengo took a 2–0 lead with goals from Cláudio Adão and Cléber. A controversial offside call limited the scoreline, and a debated penalty enabled Aguilar to equalize for Madrid. The Spanish referee sent off three Flamengo players, but the team, reduced to eight players, secured the victory. That year, Flamengo began an unbeaten streak, reaching 52 games with a 2–1 win over Campo Grande on 27 May 1979, matching Botafogo's national record.

The streak started with a 2–1 victory against America on 21 October 1978, during the Carioca Championship. Renato Sá, playing for Botafogo, scored the goal that ended Flamengo's run, having previously ended Botafogo's streak while with Grêmio. A notable match during this period was a 5–1 friendly win over Atlético Mineiro, with Pelé playing for Flamengo. Approximately 140,000 fans attended the Maracanã to see Pelé and Zico, with Júlio César excelling after rooming with Pelé the previous night. At 39, Pelé performed well without scoring, complementing Zico, who scored three goals, in a style similar to his partnership with Coutinho at Santos. In 1979, Flamengo won the Ramón de Carranza Trophy, defeating Barcelona in the semifinals with goals from Júlio César and Zico, and Újpest 2–0 in the final, both goals by Zico. Flamengo also secured a state three-peat in 1978, 1979, and 1979 (special), defeating Vasco da Gama in two of these.

Flamengo won its first national title in 1980, the Brazilian Championship. The team prioritized the championship, losing only once in the first phase and remaining unbeaten until the final. In the semifinals, Flamengo defeated Coritiba, winning 2–0 in the first leg and 4–3 in the second. In the final against Atlético Mineiro, Atlético won the first leg 1–0 at Mineirão, with Reinaldo scoring. In the return leg at Maracanã, attended by over 150,000 fans, Nunes scored for Flamengo at 7 minutes, but Reinaldo equalized. Zico scored before halftime, and Reinaldo leveled the score again in the second half. After Reinaldo's expulsion, Nunes scored the decisive goal. Flamengo's campaign ensured a draw in aggregate secured the title. This victory qualified Flamengo for the Copa Libertadores. In 1980, Flamengo also won the Ramón de Carranza Trophy (against Betis), the Santander City Trophy (over Levski Sofia), and the Prince Felipe of Asturias Trophy (against Real Sociedad, which later won Spanish championships for two seasons).

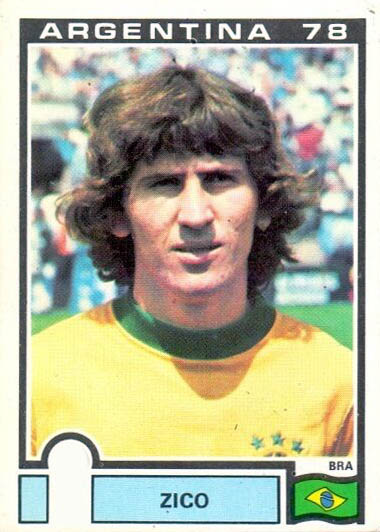
Zico, a key figure in Flamengo's history, played a central role during the 1970s and 1980s.

In 1981, Flamengo prepared for its first Copa Libertadores by participating in international tournaments, securing victories in the Punta del Este Cup in Uruguay against Grêmio, Peñarol, and the Maldonado city selection, as well as the Naples International Tournament in Italy against Napoli, Avellino, and Linfield. During the 1981 Copa Libertadores, Flamengo encountered Atlético-MG in the group stage, resulting in two 2–2 draws. Flamengo recorded two additional draws and two wins, matching Atlético in points. A playoff match at Serra Dourada Stadium in Goiânia concluded with a 0–0 score, and Flamengo advanced after Atlético had five players sent off. In the semifinals, which consisted of two groups of three teams with the top team from each advancing to the final, Flamengo competed against Deportivo Cali from Colombia and Jorge Wilstermann from Bolivia, winning all four matches to qualify for the final against Chile's Cobreloa.

In the final, Flamengo faced Cobreloa. In the first leg at Maracanã, Flamengo won 2–1, with Zico scoring both goals. In the second leg in Santiago, Flamengo lost 1–0, marking their only defeat in the tournament. As there was no away goals rule at the time, a third match was scheduled in Montevideo, Uruguay.

In Uruguay, Flamengo played with control, maintaining possession and securing a 2–0 victory, with Zico scoring both goals. Toward the end of the match, with the game in hand, coach Cláudio Coutinho substituted in the lesser-known striker Anselmo, assigning him the task of confronting Cobreloa's defender Mario Soto, who had previously clashed with Adílio and Lico in Santiago. Anselmo struck Soto with a forceful punch. Through a combination of skill, style, and determination, Flamengo won the Copa Libertadores. In 2015, the South American Football Confederation noted that Flamengo attracted a total of 516,382 spectators across its six Maracanã matches in the 1981 Libertadores, marking the highest attendance recorded in a single edition of the tournament.

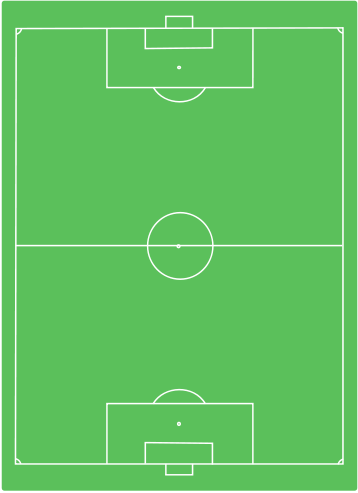

Formation used by coach Carpegiani in the Intercontinental Cup final in 1981.

The 1981 Copa Libertadores title qualified Flamengo for the 1981 Intercontinental Cup, which was officially recognized as a world championship by FIFA in October 2017. Flamengo competed against Liverpool in Tokyo. Prior to the match, coach Cláudio Coutinho died in a drowning accident while diving off the Ilhas Cagarras. Paulo César Carpegiani, a former Flamengo player, was appointed as the coach for the match. The game, held at the Tokyo Olympic Stadium with 62,000 spectators, saw Flamengo score three goals in the first half through Nunes (two) and Adílio. In the second half, Flamengo maintained control and secured the world title. Zico was named the best player of the match. Flamengo is the only Carioca club with a FIFA-recognized world title. That same year, Flamengo defeated Botafogo 6–0, matching a 6–0 loss to Botafogo on Flamengo's anniversary in 1972.

In 1982, Flamengo aimed to win another Brazilian Championship. They advanced through the first phase and faced Santos in the quarterfinals, winning 2–1 in the first leg and drawing 1–1 in the second. In the semifinals, Flamengo defeated Guarani in both matches, 2–1 and 3–2, to advance to the final against defending champions Grêmio.

Grêmio proved to be a tough opponent. The first leg at Maracanã ended in a 1–1 draw. The second match, held at Olímpico in Porto Alegre, resulted in a 0–0 draw. A third match, also at Olímpico, determined the champion. Flamengo secured a victory with a goal from Nunes in the first half, earning their second Brazilian Championship title away from home. Zico topped the tournament's scoring chart with 21 goals. In the 1982 Copa Libertadores, Flamengo and River Plate were both eliminated in the semifinal group stage by Peñarol, who defeated Cobreloa to claim their fourth Libertadores title.

In 1983, Flamengo was the team to beat in the Brazilian Championship. They progressed through the first phase and faced Vasco in the quarterfinals, securing a 2–1 victory and a 1–1 draw. In the semifinals, Flamengo played Atlético-PR, winning 3–0 in the first leg and losing 2–0 in the second, advancing to the final against Santos.

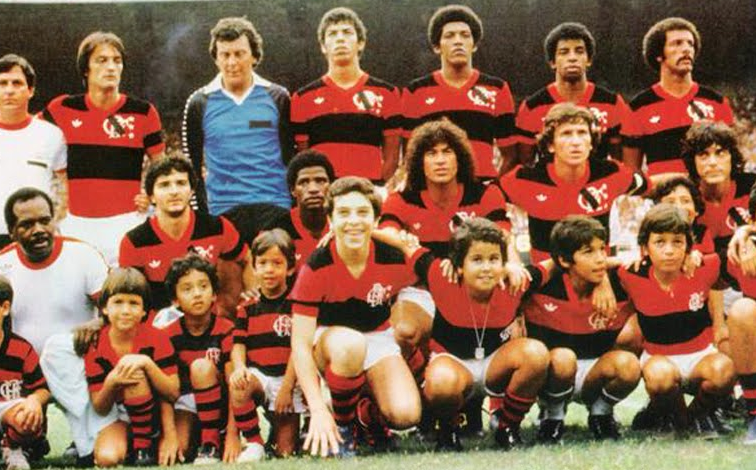
The 1980s Flamengo squad.

Santos reached the Brazilian Championship final for the first time since 1968, when they won the 1968 Roberto Gomes Pedrosa Tournament against Internacional, a title later recognized by the CBF in 2010 as a Brazilian Championship. In the first leg at Morumbi, Santos won 2–1. The second leg at Maracanã drew 155,253 spectators, a notable attendance record. Flamengo won 3–0 with goals from Zico, Leandro, and Adílio, earning their third Brazilian Championship and cementing their legacy. Following the championship, Zico transferred to Udinese in Italy. After the national title, Flamengo participated in the 1983 Mundialito de Clubs in Milan. In a round-robin format, they recorded two wins (2–1 against Internazionale and 2–0 against Peñarol), a 1–1 draw with Milan, and a 2–1 loss to Juventus, finishing second, one point behind Juventus. All matches were held at Stadio Giuseppe Meazza.

=== 1984 to 1992: Zico's return, Copa União, and national titles ===
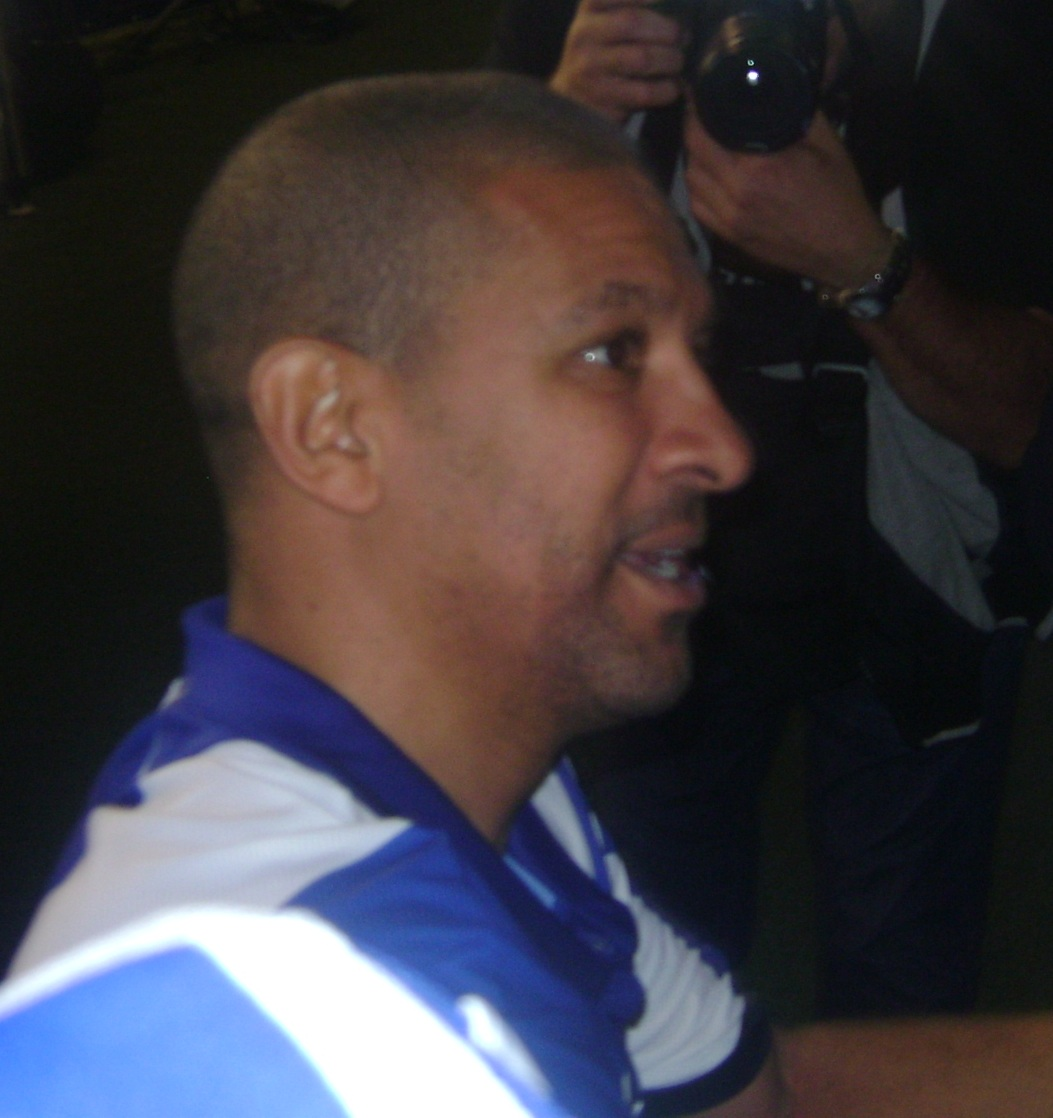
Djalminha played for Flamengo from 1989 to 1993.

Flamengo reached the 1984 Copa Libertadores semifinals without Zico but was eliminated, along with Universidad de Los Andes from Venezuela, by Grêmio. In the final, Independiente of Argentina defeated Grêmio to claim their seventh Libertadores title. Zico returned in 1986 and won the Carioca Championship. A severe injury from a tackle by Bangu’s Márcio Nunes in 1985 limited his play that year, requiring extensive recovery. In the 1987 state championship's opening match, Zico scored three goals in Flamengo's 4–1 victory over Fluminense. In 1986, Flamengo also won the Orange Trophy against Valencia and the Linfield Football Club Centennial Trophy.

In 1987, the CBF faced financial and institutional challenges, making it unable to organize the national championship as in previous years. Without a sponsor, it suggested clubs fund their own travel or compete in a regionalized tournament. In response, thirteen top clubs, based on the CBF Ranking—Corinthians, Palmeiras, São Paulo, Santos, Flamengo, Vasco, Fluminense, Botafogo, Atlético-MG, Cruzeiro, Internacional, Grêmio, and Bahia—formed the Club of the 13 to organize the Copa União (officially the Módulo Verde of the Brazilian Championship per the CBF). The CBF included Coritiba, Goiás, and Santa Cruz in the Copa União/Módulo Verde, which led to objections from Guarani (1986 runners-up, excluded from Módulo Verde, and suing the CBF) and America (1986 fourth-place, refusing to participate in the Módulo Amarelo). America's directors stated: "Technical criteria weren’t followed for the modules’ formation. The CBF issued invitations. We refused to play in the Módulo Amarelo, which is essentially a second division."

In the Copa União, Atlético-MG went unbeaten in 15 matches during the first phase, advancing to the semifinals alongside Flamengo, Cruzeiro, and Internacional.

In the semifinals, Flamengo faced Atlético-MG at Maracanã, winning 1–0 with a goal from Bebeto. In the second leg, Flamengo took a 2–0 lead thanks to goals from Renato Gaúcho and Zico. Atlético-MG tied the score at 2–2, but Renato Gaúcho's goal secured a 3–2 win for Flamengo, eliminating Atlético-MG.

Flamengo advanced to the final against Internacional, who had defeated Cruzeiro. In the first leg at Beira-Rio with 62,228 spectators, Flamengo scored through Bebeto, but Internacional equalized, ending 1–1. In the second leg on 13 December at Maracanã, with over 90,000 fans despite heavy rain, Bebeto scored early against Taffarel. Flamengo's defense, led by Zé Carlos, held firm, securing the Copa União title. Flamengo received the João Havelange Trophy from the CBF for winning the Módulo Verde (displayed in Flamengo's trophy room museum) and the Copa União trophy from Placar, later given to Zico in 1990 during his farewell. Both trophies were displayed during the victory lap after defeating Internacional, marking Zico's final national title.

In September 1987, three months before the Copa União final, Miguel Aidar, president of the Clube dos 13, stated that none of the sixteen clubs in the Copa União would participate in a quadrangular playoff after learning of Eurico Miranda’s actions. Following Flamengo's victory, the Clube dos 13 unanimously decided that Flamengo and Internacional would not compete in the CBF's crossover between the top two teams of the green and yellow modules, resulting in forfeited matches by W.O. The Clube dos 13 claimed the CBF changed the regulations after the Copa União began. The Clube dos 13 maintained that their agreement with the CBF designated the quadrangular to determine Brazil's Libertadores representatives, not the national champion. The National Sports Council supported Flamengo and the Clube dos 13.

The Clube dos 13 agreed to a quadrangular before the matches, with their representative Eurico Miranda signing a document at the CBF, committing to follow the CBF's regulations. In an interview with Folha de S.Paulo, Eurico Miranda stated that he signed the agreement "to ensure the competition took place," in accordance with the wishes of Clube dos 13 members and the CBF. However, the Clube dos 13 later refused to participate in the crossover, stating that Eurico Miranda acted against the wishes of the other twelve representatives who opposed the crossover. In an interview with the Trivela website, part of the UOL Group, Miguel Aidar said: "He (Eurico Miranda) betrayed us and gave the green light for the CBF to overturn the table, even against the decision of the other 12 clubs not to hold the crossover with the Yellow Module." The CND (National Sports Council), the highest authority in Brazilian football at the time, declared Flamengo the sole Brazilian champion in 1988 by a majority vote, recognizing Flamengo and Internacional as champion and runner-up, respectively, despite Article 5 of CND Resolution No. 16/86 requiring unanimity for decisions on changes to CBF regulations. The CBF, however, maintained its position, officially recognizing Sport as the 1987 Brazilian champion and Guarani FC as the runner-up. On 21 February 2011, through CBF Presidential Resolution No. 02/2011, Flamengo was officially recognized as a co-champion of 1987 alongside Sport. In June 2011, following a ruling by the 10th Federal Court of First Instance in Pernambuco, the CBF retracted this decision, recognizing Sport as the sole 1987 champion. On 28 June 2012, a CBF manual recognized Flamengo's 1987 Brazilian title. The CBF later stated that the manual contained a "gross error" due to outdated material sent to the printer, which listed Flamengo as a co-champion of 1987 alongside Sport. On 8 April 2014, the Superior Court of Justice (STJ) confirmed Sport as the sole 1987 Brazilian champion after Flamengo contested the lower court's ruling.

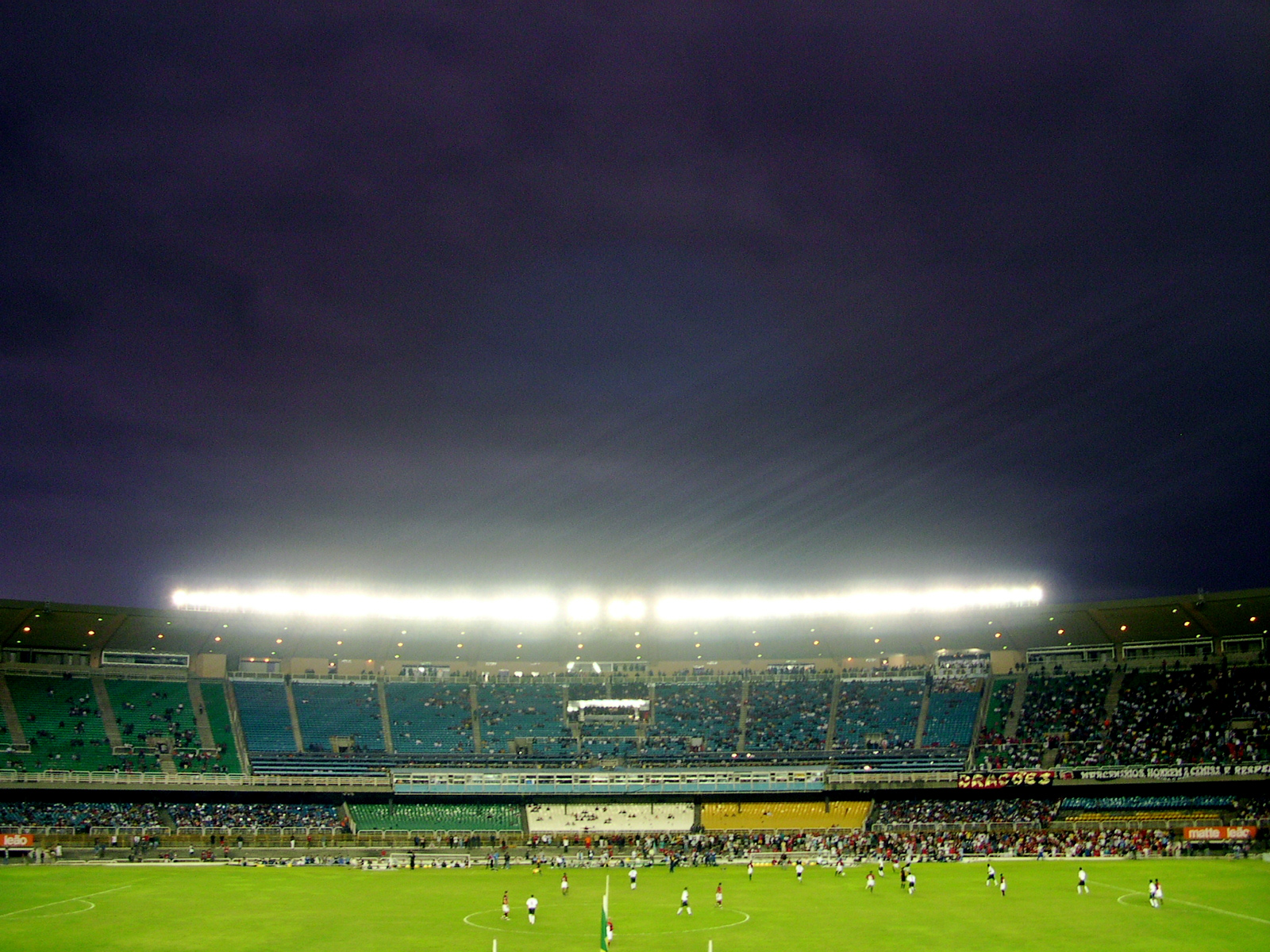
Maracanã during a Flamengo match

On 18 April 2017, the 1st Chamber of the Supreme Federal Court (STF) rejected Flamengo's appeal against the court's decision granting Sport Club do Recife the sole right to be recognized by the Brazilian Football Confederation (CBF) as the 1987 Brazilian champion, confirming Sport Club do Recife as the sole champion. The CBF recognizes Sport as the 1987 champion but maintains that recognizing Flamengo as a co-champion would not violate the limits of res judicata. The CBF expressed disagreement with the judicial decision, complying with the order to recognize Sport as the legitimate champion due to legal obligation, while stating that both clubs were considered champions.

In 1988, Flamengo won the Trofeo Colombino against Recreativo de Huelva, in a tournament that also included Cruzeiro and Real Zaragoza. That same year, the club won the Kirin Cup Soccer, defeating Bayer Leverkusen 1–0 in the final with a goal by Zico. The tournament also featured the Chinese national team and the Japanese national team.

During his time with Flamengo, Zico scored 568 goals, becoming the club's all-time leading scorer. In 1990, Zico played his farewell match for Flamengo at a packed Maracanã.

Following Zico's departure, Flamengo achieved success in the early 1990s. The club won the second edition of the Copa do Brasil in 1990, defeating Goiás. Between late 1990 and throughout 1991, Flamengo, led by Júnior, defeated Vasco in five consecutive matches, securing the Carioca Championship. In 1991, Flamengo also won the inaugural Copa Rio, defeating Americano 3–0 in the final.

In 1992, Flamengo won another national title. The club finished fourth in the first phase of the competition, qualifying for Group 1 of the second phase. They topped the group, advancing to the final against Botafogo, the Group 2 champions, in the second carioca final in Brasileirão history.

In the first leg, Flamengo won 3–0, with goals from Júnior, Nélio, and Gaúcho in the first half. In the second leg on 16 July, they drew 2–2 before 122,000 fans, securing the Brazilian championship. The match included a notable moment when Júnior dribbled past Renato Gaúcho. Following the Brazilian title, Flamengo competed in the Brazilian Champions Cup, organized by Brahma. The tournament featured Flamengo (1992 Brazilian champions) against Paraná (1992 Série B champions), and Flamengo won the match. In 1992, Flamengo reached the semifinals of the Supercopa Libertadores but was eliminated by Racing Club.

=== 1993 to 1998: Financial crisis, centennial, and Romário's signing ===
After the 1992 Brazilian title, Flamengo faced a severe financial crisis, resulting in fewer national and international triumphs. Despite this, the club continued to win titles regularly, remaining one of the few Brazilian clubs to avoid a prolonged title drought. In 1993, Flamengo defeated Kashima Antlers to win the Pepsi Cup, a match that marked Zico’s farewell from Japanese football. Days later, Flamengo beat Bayern Munich 3–1 in the Kuala Lumpur International Tournament final, which also included Dundee United, Leeds United, Selangor, and the Australian national team. At the end of 1993, Flamengo lost the Supercopa Libertadores final to São Paulo. In 1995, the club's centennial year, radio broadcaster Kléber Leite became president and signed striker Romário from FC Barcelona. Despite Romário, who competed with Túlio and Renato Gaúcho for the unofficial "King of Rio" title, and other players like Edmundo and Branco, Flamengo won only the Taça Guanabara, with three goals by Romário against Botafogo. In the Brazilian Championship, Flamengo narrowly avoided relegation for the first time, due to a strong second half in the group stage. They also finished as runners-up in the Supercopa Libertadores, coached by Apolinho.

In 1996, Flamengo won the Carioca Championship and the Taça Guanabara unbeaten, defeating Vasco in the final Taça Rio match to secure the title early. Romário was the state championship's top scorer, and Sávio performed well in Flamengo's Copa de Oro campaign, where they defeated São Paulo to win the club's third official international title.

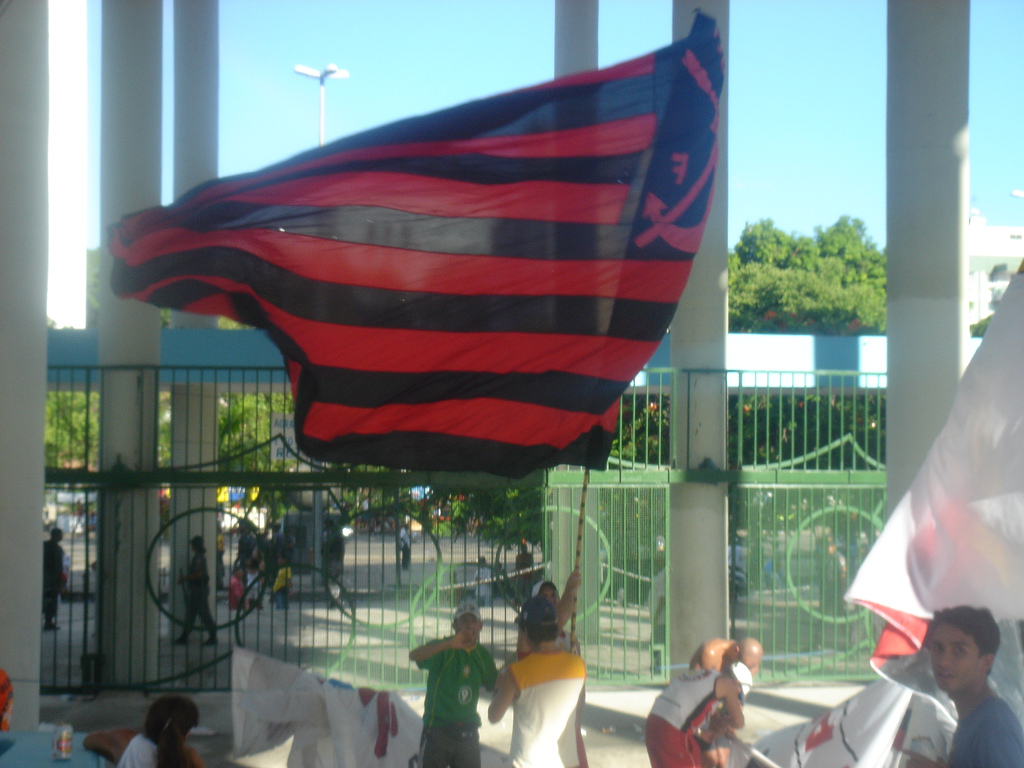
Flamengo flag at the Maracanã entrance.

In 1997, Flamengo won the 147 Years of Juiz de Fora Trophy and the third edition of the Copa dos Campeões Mundiais, defeating São Paulo. The tournament included all Brazilian clubs that had won the Intercontinental Cup. That year, Flamengo returned to the Palma de Mallorca City Trophy. In the semifinals, they faced Real Madrid. Nineteen years earlier, the two teams had met in the same tournament, with Flamengo winning despite being three players down. In 1997, Flamengo defeated Real Madrid 3–0, with goals from Maurinho, Lúcio, and Sávio. In the final, Flamengo lost 2–0 to Real Mallorca.

In 1998, Flamengo finished as runners-up in the Carioca Championship to Vasco da Gama. In the Brasileirão, the team struggled to avoid the lower ranks, ending the season without titles and with limited funds to strengthen the squad.

=== 1999 to 2001: Partnership with ISL, investment in multiple sports, and rivalry with Vasco da Gama ===
In 1999, Edmundo dos Santos Silva assumed the presidency of Flamengo and signed a significant contract with sports marketing company ISL. ISL representatives stated that Flamengo was positioned to become Brazil's leading club in football and business, aiming to rank among the world's top ten clubs.

To counter their rivals Vasco da Gama, led by Eurico Miranda and partnered with Bank of America, both clubs built competitive football squads. Flamengo fielded players like Gamarra, Petković, Alex, Denílson, and Edílson, while Vasco included Juninho Paulista, Juninho Pernambucano, Ramon, and Euller. Both clubs also invested in various sports, surpassing the Brazilian Olympic Committee's spending by supporting athletes in basketball, volleyball, beach volleyball, judo, sailing, and equestrianism, with numerous athletes competing at the Sydney 2000 Olympics. The rivalry extended to swimming, men's basketball, and women's volleyball. In volleyball, Vasco, led by Fernanda Venturini, won the carioca title against Flamengo, but Flamengo, with Virna and Leila, secured the 2000–01 Superliga title against Vasco.

Eurico Miranda stated: "I made Vasco the great rival of Flamengo." Despite inconsistent performances in the Brazilian Championship, Flamengo achieved success in other competitions, winning the state championship in 1999, 2000, and 2001, all against Vasco. In the Copa Mercosur, Flamengo advanced to the quarterfinals as Group E's second-placed team, alongside Club Olimpia, eliminating Chile's Colo-Colo and Club Universidad de Chile. They faced Club Atlético Independiente in the quarterfinals, drawing 1–1 in the first leg with goals from Fábio Baiano and Calderón, then winning 4–0 at home. In the semifinals, Flamengo defeated Peñarol 3–0 at home but lost 3–2 in Uruguay in a match marked by a brawl, ranked as the 13th biggest fight in football history by Argentina's "El Gráfico" magazine. Flamengo reached the final against Palmeiras, the 1999 Copa Libertadores champions and Intercontinental Cup runners-up after losing to Manchester United in Japan. In the first leg in Rio, Flamengo won 4–3. In the second leg, Arce scored for Palmeiras, but Flamengo responded, with Rodrigo Mendes contributing significantly. Despite Palmeiras narrowing the score to 3–2, Lê scored a late goal to secure a 3–3 draw, winning the Copa Mercosur for Flamengo.

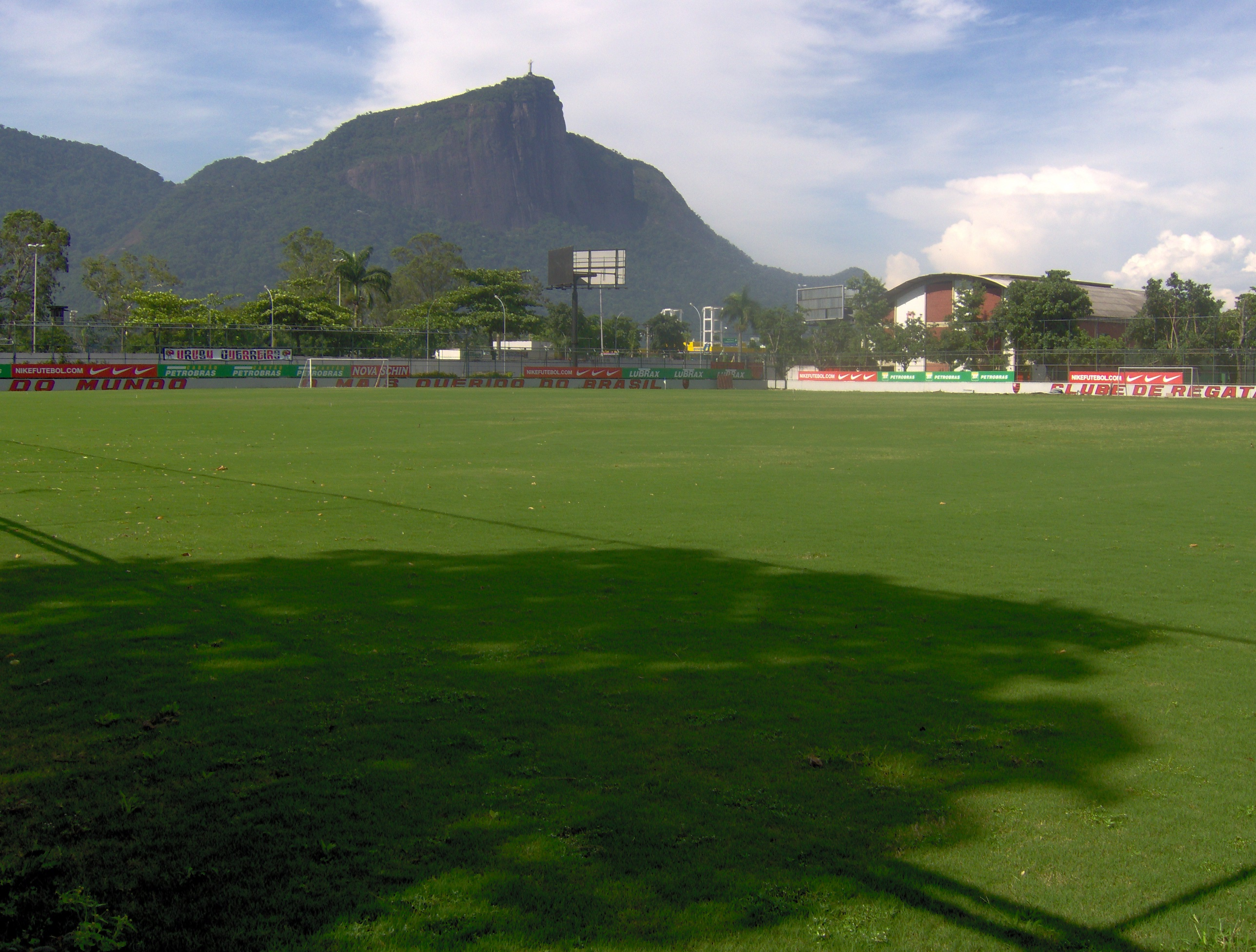
Gávea Stadium.

In 2001, Flamengo won the Copa dos Campeões, a tournament featuring winners of the Carioca Championship, Paulista Championship, Torneio Rio-São Paulo, Copa do Nordeste, finalists of the Copa Sul-Minas, and a triangular among the Norte, Centro-Oeste, and Nordeste runners-up. In the final, Flamengo defeated São Paulo over two matches, winning 5–3 in the first leg and losing 3–2 in the second, securing the title. In the Copa Mercosur, Flamengo finished as runners-up, losing to San Lorenzo on penalties after defeating Independiente in the quarterfinals and Grêmio in the semifinals. In 2001, Flamengo avoided relegation to Série B on the final matchday of the Brazilian Championship, marking the start of several challenging Brasileirão campaigns, with four involving relegation battles.

=== 2002 to 2006: ISL bankruptcy, financial difficulties, and relegation battles ===
In 2002, ISL went bankrupt for reasons unrelated to its contract with Flamengo, leaving the club without its financial partner. Unable to maintain its high-profile squad, Flamengo faced significant financial challenges, accumulating over R$100 million in liabilities, making it Brazil's most indebted club. That year, Edmundo dos Santos Silva was removed from the presidency in a controversial vote, with allegations that the club's statutes’ quorum requirement was not met. Only tax evasion charges, which the former president admitted, have been substantiated. Without funds for major signings, Flamengo struggled to field competitive teams, narrowly avoiding relegation in the Brazilian Championship in 2002, 2004, and 2005.

ISL's bankruptcy led to labor court issues, unpaid salaries, and substantial debts to players, reinforcing Flamengo's position as Brazil's most indebted club across short- and long-term, labor, and pension obligations.

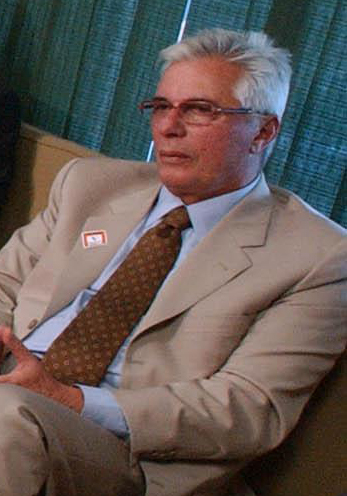
Márcio Braga, the club's most successful director, returned to lead Flamengo from 2004 to 2009.

In 2003 and 2004, Flamengo reached the Copa do Brasil final, losing to Cruzeiro in 2003 and Santo André in 2004 at the Maracanã.

In late 2003, Márcio Braga was elected president for the 2004–2006 term. Having served over five terms, he aimed to restore the club's credibility. In 2004, Flamengo won its 28th state title against Vasco da Gama. In the 2004 Brazilian Championship, Flamengo faced relegation pressure but secured their position with a 6–2 victory over Cruzeiro in the final round, finishing three points above the relegation zone. In 2005, Flamengo experienced significant challenges, failing to win the Finta International Cup and struggling in the Brazilian Championship. Under coach Joel Santana, Flamengo achieved six wins and three draws in nine matches, avoiding relegation in 2006.

=== 2006 to 2009: New beginnings ===
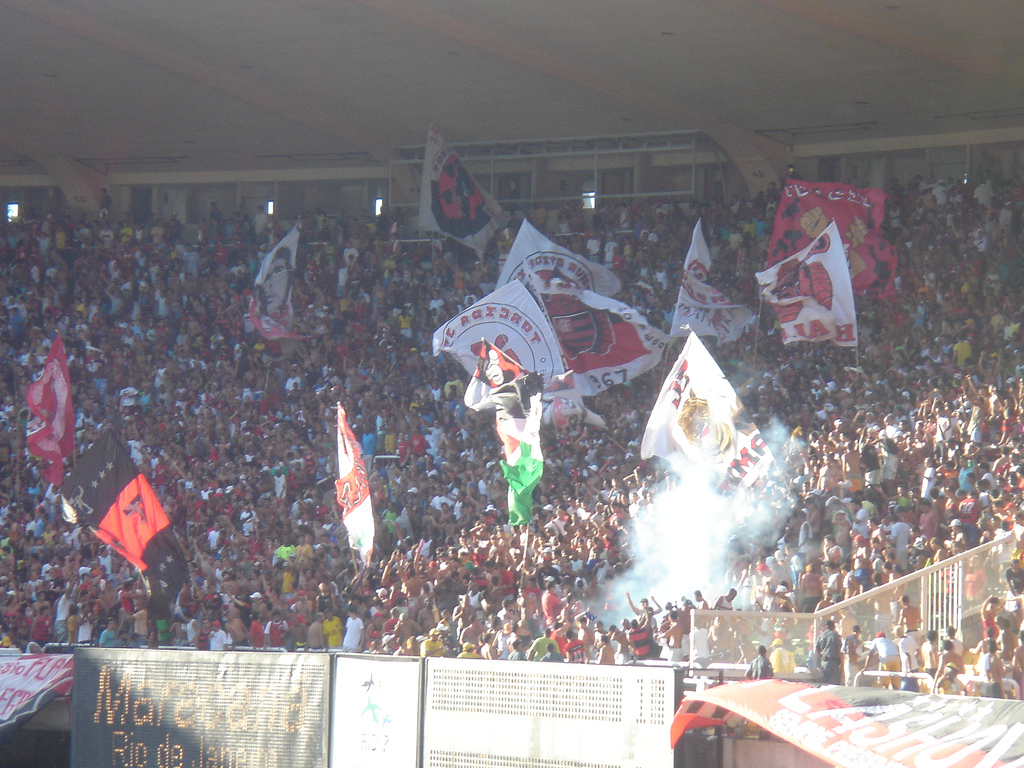
Flamengo fans at the Maracanã.

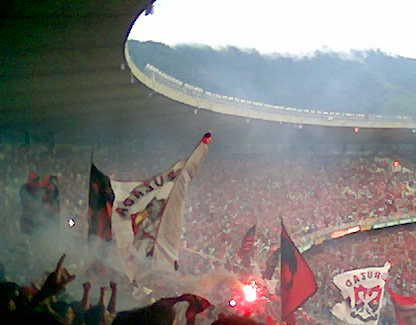
Flamengo supporters at the Maracanã in 2007.

In 2006, Flamengo advanced to the Copa do Brasil final for the fifth time, defeating Vasco to win the title. Despite reaching the final, coach Waldemar Lemos was sacked, and Ney Franco was appointed as his replacement. Márcio Braga was reelected as president for the 2007–2009 term.

In 2007, Flamengo participated in the Copa Libertadores and won the Taça Guanabara. They secured the state championship title against Botafogo in a penalty shootout. In the Libertadores, Flamengo were eliminated by Defensor Sporting from Uruguay in the round of 16, losing 3–0 in Montevideo and winning 2–0 at home. The 2007 Brazilian Championship saw Flamengo struggle initially, leading to Ney Franco's dismissal and the reappointment of Joel Santana. The team recovered from 18th place to finish 3rd, earning a spot in the 2008 Copa Libertadores. During this period, Flamengo recorded high attendance figures, with nearly every match attracting over 65,000 fans and a peak of over 82,000. The song "Festa na favela", adapted from Ivete Sangalo’s "Poeira", became popular among fans. Márcio Braga noted that the club had regained its competitive standing, marking its strongest Brasileirão performance since 1992.

In 2008, Flamengo won the Taça Guanabara and the Carioca Championship, both against Botafogo. In the Libertadores, they achieved the second-best record in the first phase but were eliminated in the round of 16 by Club América, winning 4–2 at the Estadio Azteca but losing 3–0 at the Maracanã in Joel Santana's final match before he left to coach South Africa. In the Brazilian Championship, under new coach Caio Júnior, Flamengo started well but lost key players mid-season, finishing 5th and missing a Libertadores qualification spot. Financial difficulties increased as Petrobras ended its long-term sponsorship, leaving Flamengo without a sponsor for 2009. Meanwhile, rivals Vasco were relegated to Série B, leaving Flamengo as the only carioca club never relegated.

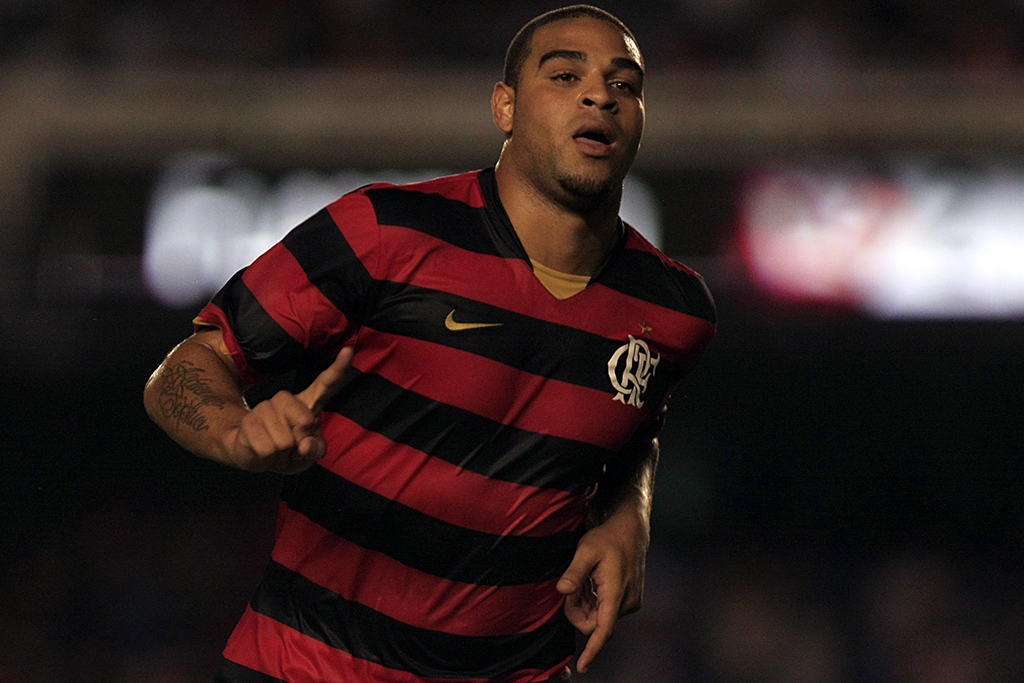
Adriano was a key leader in the 2009 Brazilian Championship victory.

In 2009, Flamengo won the Taça Rio against Botafogo and secured the state championship title in a penalty shootout, achieving a three-peat (2007–2009) and taking the lead in state titles with 31, ahead of Fluminense’s 30. In the Copa do Brasil, they were eliminated by Internacional after a 0–0 draw at the Maracanã and a 2–1 loss away. For the Brazilian Championship, Flamengo signed Adriano and Petković. Coach Cuca was sacked on 22 July, and Andrade took over. Flamengo staged a recovery in the championship, overcoming a 13-point deficit to leaders Palmeiras. They took the lead in the penultimate round after defeating Corinthians 2–0 and benefiting from São Paulo's 4–2 loss to Goiás. On 6 December, Flamengo defeated Grêmio 2–1 at the Maracanã with over 78,000 fans, securing the championship after 17 years. They finished with 67 points, the lowest for a champion under the current Brasileirão format, leading for only the final two rounds. Márcio Braga stepped down, and Patrícia Amorim became Flamengo's first female president for the 2010–2012 term.

=== 2010 to 2012: Challenges and financial struggles ===
In 2010, Flamengo signed striker Vágner Love, pairing him with Adriano to form the "Empire of Love" duo. They started strongly in the state championship but lost to Botafogo in the Taça Guanabara semifinal (2–1) and the Taça Rio final (2–1), missing a fourth consecutive state title. In the Copa Libertadores, Flamengo qualified for the round of 16 with three wins, one draw, and two losses but were eliminated by Club Universidad de Chile on the away goals rule (losing 3–2 at the Maracanã and winning 2–1 in Santiago). Coach Andrade was sacked after this exit. The departure of Adriano and Vágner Love, combined with the Bruno case, led to further instability. Coach Rogério Lourenço was sacked, followed by Silas. Vanderlei Luxemburgo was appointed on 5 October, leading Flamengo to avoid relegation and secure a 2011 Copa Sudamericana spot with a record 17 draws in the Brazilian Championship.

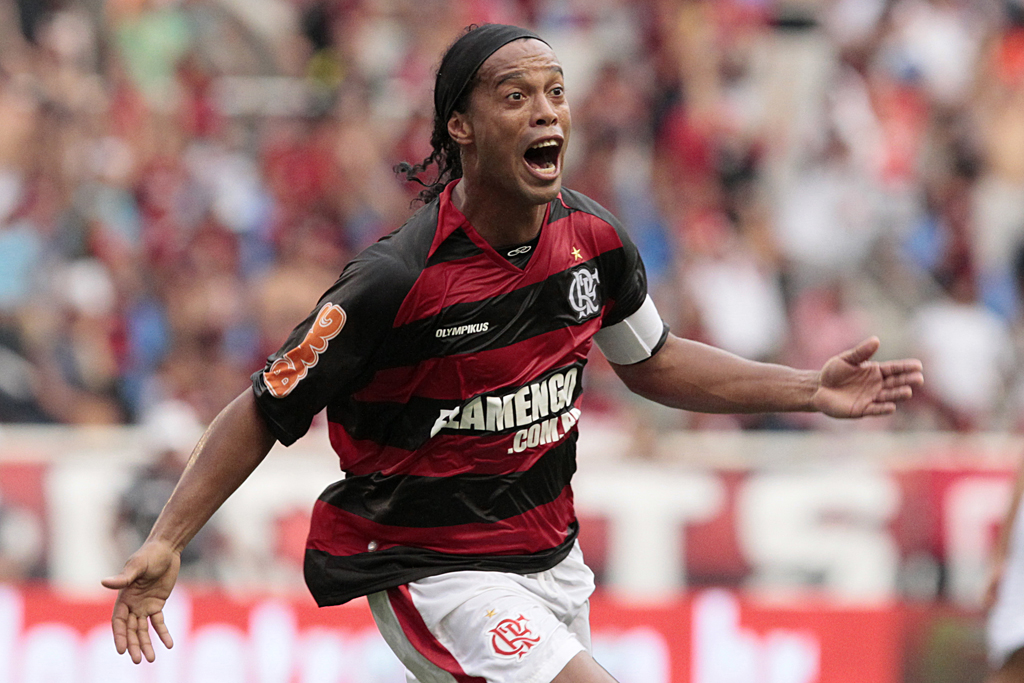
Ronaldinho was a major signing in 2011

In 2011, Flamengo signed Darío Bottinelli, Thiago Neves, and Ronaldinho Gaúcho. They won the Carioca Championship unbeaten. However, they were eliminated by Ceará in the Copa do Brasil and by Universidad de Chile in the Copa Sudamericana (4–0 at the Engenhão). In the Brazilian Championship, Flamengo started strongly but finished fourth, qualifying for the 2012 Copa Libertadores. Dejan Petković retired, and Ronaldo Angelim moved to Grêmio Barueri.

In 2012, Flamengo faced financial difficulties, including unpaid salaries, leading to tensions between coach Vanderlei Luxemburgo and players, notably Ronaldinho Gaúcho, who terminated his contract, demanding R$40 million. Thiago Neves moved to Fluminense, and Alex Silva was loaned to Cruzeiro. Flamengo re-signed Vágner Love and welcomed back loaned players, including Ibson. Joel Santana replaced Luxemburgo but was sacked after losses in the Carioca Championship and Libertadores. Dorival Júnior took over, starting with a 0–0 draw against Portuguesa. Flamengo's 2012 Brazilian Championship campaign included a 1–1 draw against Sport, further draws against Internacional and Ponte Preta, a 3–1 win over Coritiba, and a 2–0 loss to Grêmio. After a seven-match winless streak, Flamengo defeated Atlético Goianiense 2–1 and Atlético Mineiro 2–1, and secured safety with a 1–0 win over Náutico. They contributed to Palmeiras’ relegation and finished 11th after a 2–2 draw with Botafogo. A 4–1 loss to São Paulo highlighted ongoing squad issues. Dorival Júnior's first win came against Figueirense, 2–0.

In 2012, Flamengo faced significant financial challenges, including unpaid electricity bills. An opposition slate led by Wallim Vasconcellos aimed to address these issues but was disqualified. Eduardo Bandeira de Mello, supported by Zico, became president for the 2013–2015 term, replacing Patrícia Amorim, with the goal of stabilizing the club's finances.

== 2013 to 2018: The Bandeira de Mello presidency ==
In December 2012, Flamengo elected Eduardo Bandeira de Mello as president for the 2013–2015 term, succeeding Patrícia Amorim and bringing the Chapa Azul into leadership. The new administration introduced several players, including Elias, Carlos Eduardo, and Paulinho, though these signings were met with mixed reactions from fans and analysts. Vágner Love departed for CSKA, with Flamengo forgiving the remaining transfer payments owed from his prior transfer. An audit revealed the club's debt at R$750 million.

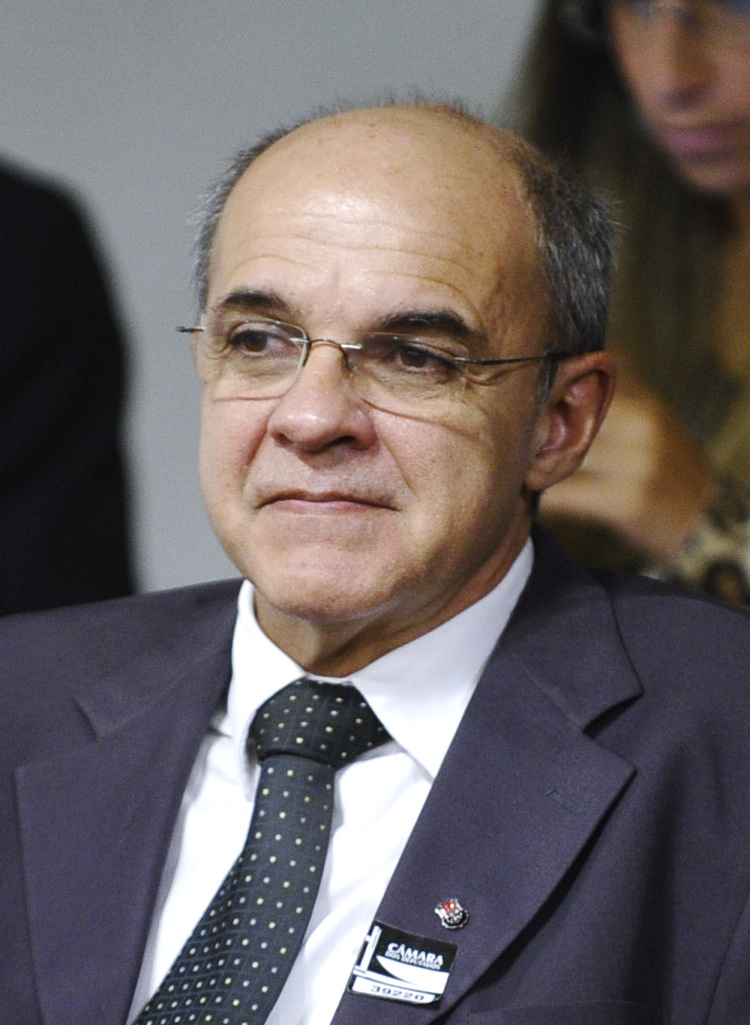
Eduardo Bandeira de Mello, Flamengo's president from 2013 to 2018, led efforts to address the club's financial and administrative challenges.

Under coach Dorival Júnior, Flamengo reached the Taça Guanabara semifinals but lost 2–0 to Botafogo. Dorival was sacked after a 3–2 loss to Resende in the Taça Rio, later suing the club for R$11 million in unpaid salaries and image rights. Jorginho was appointed but could not advance Flamengo past the Campeonato Carioca group stage.

After an early Carioca exit, Jorginho led Flamengo to the third round of the Copa do Brasil, defeating Remo and Campinense. A 1–0 loss to Náutico in the Campeonato Brasileiro led to his dismissal. Mano Menezes took over, with Jayme de Almeida securing a 3–0 win over Criciúma beforehand. Mano improved the team's Brasileirão position and advanced in the Copa do Brasil, eliminating ASA and Cruzeiro, with a late goal by Elias at the Maracanã. He resigned after a 4–2 loss to Athletico Paranaense.

Jayme de Almeida was appointed interim coach, tasked with avoiding relegation. He secured a 1–0 win over Corinthians and led Flamengo to the Copa do Brasil final, defeating Botafogo and Goiás. They won the title against Atlético Paranaense, drawing 1–1 in Curitiba with a goal from Amaral and winning 2–0 in Rio with goals from Elias and Hernane. This was Flamengo's third Copa do Brasil title, securing a spot in the 2014 Copa Libertadores, where they were eliminated in the group stage after a 3–2 loss to León.

In 2014, Flamengo reached the Campeonato Carioca final against Vasco, winning their 33rd state title after two 1–1 draws amid refereeing disputes. The Campeonato Brasileiro saw early struggles, with the team in the relegation zone before the 2014 FIFA World Cup break. Ney Franco replaced Jayme de Almeida but was succeeded by Vanderlei Luxemburgo, who led the team to a 10th-place finish.

Luxemburgo, in his fourth stint, prioritized avoiding relegation. Flamengo advanced in the Copa do Brasil, overcoming a 3–0 deficit against Coritiba to win on penalties. They reached the semifinals but were eliminated by Atlético Mineiro after a 4–1 loss.

In 2014, Flamengo recorded the highest profit in Brazilian football history, surpassing Santos's 2005 revenue of R$63.167 million. A report showed Flamengo's debt reduced to R$600 million, no longer the highest among Brazilian clubs.

In 2015, Léo Moura left for Fort Lauderdale Strikers after a decade with Flamengo. The team was eliminated by Vasco in the Campeonato Carioca semifinals, and Luxemburgo was sacked after a weak Campeonato Brasileiro start. Cristóvão Borges was appointed but dismissed after 18 matches. New signings included Paolo Guerrero and Ederson. Under Oswaldo de Oliveira, Flamengo achieved a six-game winning streak but finished mid-table due to injuries. The club's debt fell to R$520 million, and Bandeira de Mello was re-elected for 2016–2018.

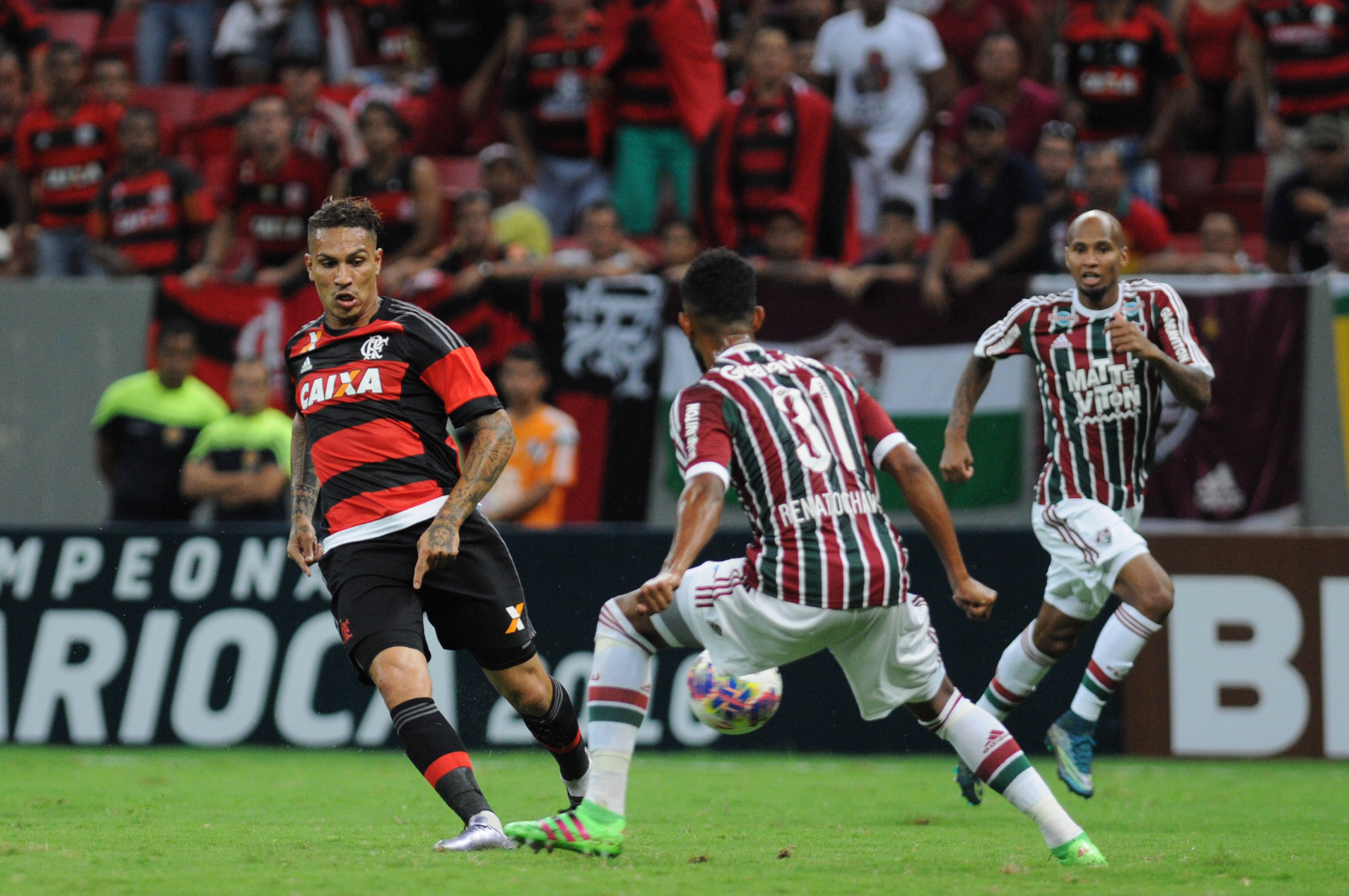
Fluminense vs. Flamengo in the Campeonato Carioca at Estádio Mané Garrincha in 2016.

In 2016, Muricy Ramalho was appointed coach but stepped down due to health issues. Zé Ricardo took over, leading Flamengo to a strong Campeonato Brasileiro campaign, finishing behind Palmeiras. Signings included Réver, Leandro Damião, and Diego.

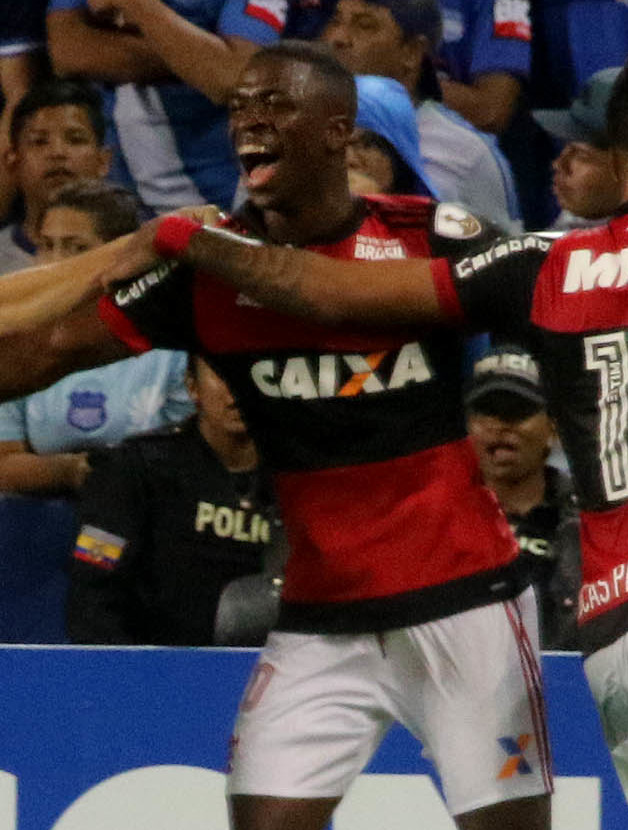
Vinícius Júnior, sold to Real Madrid in 2018 for R$164 million, then the second-highest transfer in Brazilian football and Flamengo's largest ever.

In 2017, Flamengo won the Campeonato Carioca unbeaten but was eliminated in the 2017 Copa Libertadores group stage. Zé Ricardo was sacked, and Reinaldo Rueda was appointed, alongside signings Éverton Ribeiro and Diego Alves. Flamengo reached the Copa do Brasil final, losing to Cruzeiro on penalties, and the Copa Sudamericana final, falling to Independiente. They finished sixth in the Brasileirão, securing a Libertadores spot. A financial study ranked Flamengo among the top 30 globally, driven by the sale of Vinícius Júnior to Real Madrid.

In 2018, Flamengo won the Taça Guanabara but was eliminated in the Taça Rio, Campeonato Carioca, Copa do Brasil, and Copa Libertadores semifinals or earlier. They finished second in the Campeonato Brasileiro with 72 points. Rodolfo Landim succeeded Bandeira de Mello as president for 2019–2021. By 2018, Flamengo's debt was R$360 million, with revenue exceeding R$500 million, and the club had a modern training center.

== 2019 to 2020: Flamengo's achievements under new leadership ==
In 2019, Flamengo began the year under a new administration led by president Rodolfo Landim, vice-president Marcos Braz, and executive director Bruno Spindel. Abel Braga was appointed as coach. During the pre-season, Flamengo won the Florida Cup, defeating Ajax and Eintracht Frankfurt in a tournament that also included São Paulo. This marked their first international tournament victory since the See'94 Tournament in Malaysia in 1994, where they defeated Bayern Munich 3–1 in the final, and their first single-match title since the 2003 Petrobrás 50th Anniversary Challenge Cup against Racing in Aracaju (2–1).

On 8 February, a fire at the Ninho do Urubu training center resulted in the deaths of ten youth players and injuries to three others.

On 21 April, Flamengo won their 35th Carioca title, defeating Vasco 2–0 in both legs of the final before over 47,000 fans at the Maracanã. With improved finances, the administration signed players including Bruno Henrique, Gabriel Barbosa, Rodrigo Caio, Arrascaeta, and Portuguese coach Jorge Jesus after Abel Braga's resignation in May. Additional signings included Gérson, Pablo Marí, Rafinha, and Filipe Luís.

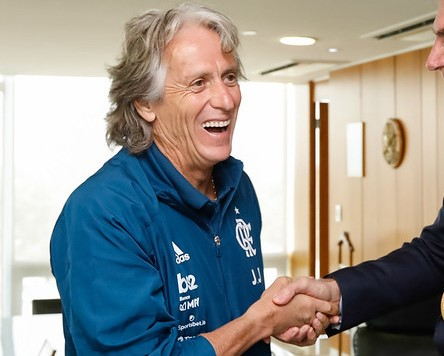
Portuguese coach Jorge Jesus, who managed Flamengo from June 2019 to July 2020.

Flamengo's lineup in the 2019 Club World Cup final against Liverpool.

In the Copa Libertadores, Flamengo lost 2–0 to Emelec in the first leg of the Round of 16 but advanced 4–2 on penalties after a 2–0 win at the Maracanã, with goals from Gabigol. They progressed past Internacional in the quarterfinals (2–0 and 1–1) and defeated Grêmio 5–0 in the semifinal second leg after a 1–1 draw, reaching the Libertadores final after 38 years. In the final at Estadio Monumental "U" in Lima, Peru, Flamengo defeated River Plate 2–1, with Gabigol scoring twice late in the match to secure their second Libertadores title. In the Campeonato Brasileiro, Flamengo went 21 matches unbeaten, clinching the title four rounds early after Palmeiras lost to Grêmio. Their campaign set records for the largest points gap in the competition's history. Flamengo matched Pelé’s Santos as the only club to win both the Brasileirão and Libertadores in the same year (1962 and 1963).

In the FIFA Club World Cup, Flamengo reached the final after a 3–1 win over Al-Hilal but lost 1–0 to Liverpool in extra time, with Roberto Firmino scoring the decisive goal.

In 2020, Flamengo won the revived Supercopa do Brasil, defeating Atlético Paranaense 3–0 at Estádio Mané Garrincha in Brasília. In the Recopa Sudamericana, Flamengo drew 2–2 with Independiente del Valle in Quito, Ecuador, and won 3–0 in the return leg at the Estádio Maracanã, with Gabigol and Gérson scoring. After winning the 2020 Campeonato Carioca, Jorge Jesus left for Benfica, having achieved five titles with four losses.

== 2020 to 2022: Financial growth and competitive success ==
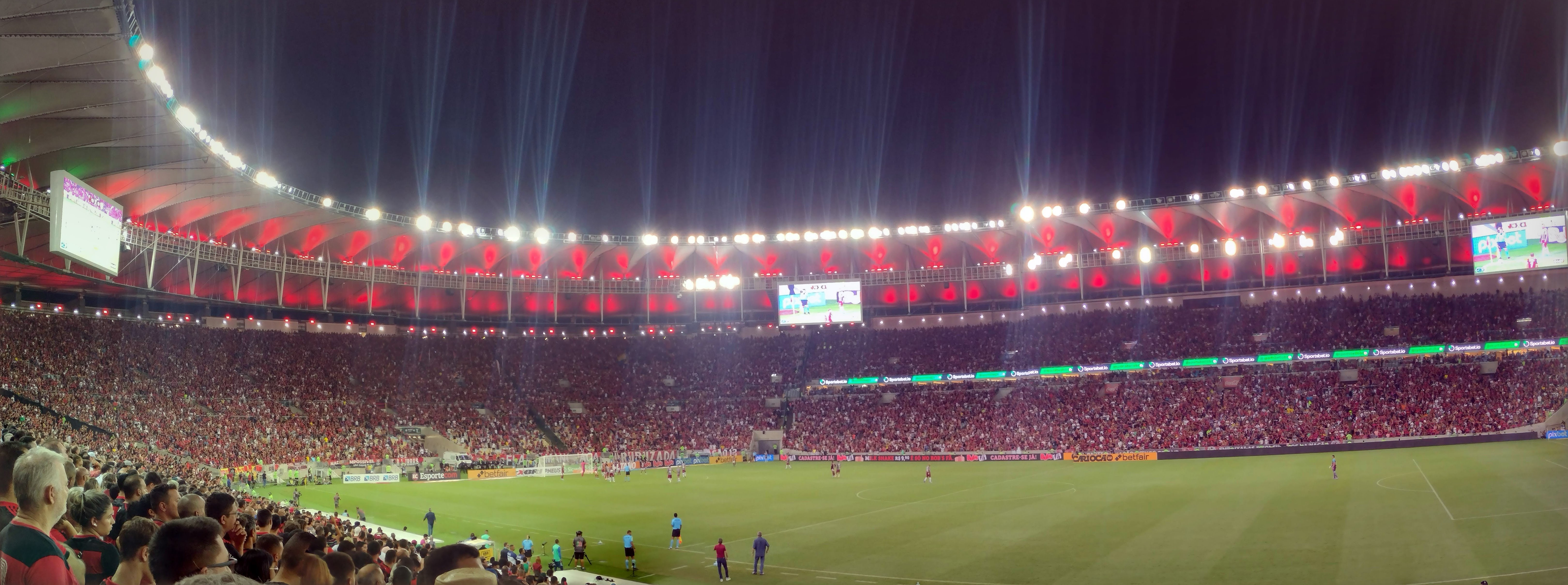
Maracanã during a Flamengo match in 2022.

Following Jorge Jesus's departure, Flamengo appointed Domènec Torrent, former assistant to Pep Guardiola. The team advanced in the Libertadores group stage and Copa do Brasil round of 16 but faced inconsistent results, leading to Torrent's dismissal after a 62% win rate (15 wins, 5 draws, 6 losses; 46 goals scored, 38 conceded). Rogério Ceni took over, leading Flamengo to the 2020 Campeonato Brasileiro title with 71 points, secured after a 2–1 comeback against Internacional. Flamengo also won the 2020 Supercopa, Carioca, and Recopa, achieving a quadruple.

In 2021, Flamengo won the Carioca Championship and Supercopa do Brasil against Palmeiras. After a slow Brasileirão start, Rogério Ceni was replaced by Renato Gaúcho, who led Flamengo to the 2021 Copa Libertadores final, where they lost 2–1 to Palmeiras in extra time, and a Brasileirão runner-up finish.

In 2022, Flamengo hired Paulo Sousa, who was sacked in July due to poor results. Dorival Júnior returned, guiding Flamengo to their fourth Copa do Brasil title against Corinthians on penalties and their third Libertadores title with a 1–0 win over Athletico Paranaense. The 2022 Libertadores campaign recorded 12 wins and one draw in 13 matches. Flamengo's revenue reached R$1.177 billion, a club record. Diego Ribas and Diego Alves retired at the season's end.

== 2023: A season without titles ==
In 2023, Flamengo, coached by Vítor Pereira, lost 4–3 to Palmeiras in the Supercopa final. At the Club World Cup, they lost 3–2 to Al-Hilal in the semifinal but won 4–2 against Al-Ahly for third place. In the Recopa, Flamengo lost on penalties to Independiente del Valle. Despite reaching the 2023 Campeonato Carioca final, they lost 4–1 to Fluminense, leading to Pereira's dismissal. Jorge Sampaoli was appointed but faced early exits in the Libertadores round of 16 to Olimpia and a Copa do Brasil runner-up finish to São Paulo. Tite took over in October, guiding Flamengo to a fourth-place Brasileirão finish.

== 2024: Stadium plans and Copa do Brasil success ==
In April 2024, Flamengo won their 38th Campeonato Carioca title against Nova Iguaçu, conceding no goals with the first team. Tite was sacked after a Libertadores quarterfinal exit to Peñarol. Filipe Luís was appointed coach, leading Flamengo to their fifth Copa do Brasil title against Atlético Mineiro with 3–1 and 1–0 victories. In the Brasileirão, Flamengo finished third. The final match against Vitória marked Gabriel Barbosa’s farewell.

Flamengo purchased land for the Gasômetro stadium for R$138.1 million, with a planned 70,000-capacity arena set for completion by 15 November 2029. The presidential election saw Rodolfo Landim’s term (2019–2024) end, with Luiz Eduardo Baptista (BAP) elected for 2025–2027.

== See also ==
- Flamengo Basketball
- Estádio da Gávea
- Maracanã Stadium
- Ninho do Urubu
