= List of CR Flamengo presidents =

Clube de Regatas do Flamengo is a multisport club based in Rio de Janeiro, Brazil. It was founded in 1895 and is one of the most popular clubs in Brazil.

== List of presidents ==
Below is the official presidential history of Clube de Regatas do Flamengo.

The club had dozens of presidents, with variable permanence time. From 1895 to 1932, the terms lasted one year, from 1933 to 1956 two years, from 1957 to 1968 three years, from 1969 to 2000 was again two years and starting from 2001 again three years.

As of 9 December 2024

No.	Image	Name	Nationality	From	To	Time in Charge	Notes
1st		Domingos Rodrigues Marques de Azevedo	Brazil	17 November 1895	23 November 1896	1 year, 6 days	
2nd		Domingos Rodrigues Marques de Azevedo	Brazil	23 November 1896	15 November 1897	357 days	
3rd		Augusto Lopes da Silveira	Brazil	15 November 1897	15 November 1898	1 year, 0 days	
4th		Júlio Gonçalves Furtado	Brazil	15 November 1898	15 November 1899	1 year, 0 days	
5th		Antônio Ferreira Vianna Filho	Brazil	15 November 1899	7 March 1900	112 days	Resigned
6th		Jacintho Pinto Lima Júnior	Brazil	7 March 1899	15 November 1900	253 days	
7th		Fidelcino da Silva Leitão	Brazil	15 November 1900	15 November 1901	1 year, 0 days	
8th		Virgilio Leite de Oliveira e Silva	Brazil	15 November 1901	15 November 1902	1 year, 0 days	
9th		Virgilio Leite de Oliveira e Silva	Brazil	15 November 1902	15 November 1903	1 year, 0 days	
10th		Arthur John Lawrence Gibbons	Brazil	15 November 1903	15 November 1904	1 year, 0 days	
11th		Mário Spíndola	Brazil	15 November 1904	8 May 1905	174 days	Resigned
12th		José Agostinho Pereira da Cunha	Brazil	8 May 1905	20 November 1905	196 days	
13th		Francis Henry Walter	Brazil	20 November 1905	25 November 1906	1 year, 5 days	
14th		Virgilio Leite de Oliveira e Silva	Brazil	25 November 1906	8 November 1907	1 year, 12 days	
15th		Virgilio Leite de Oliveira e Silva	Brazil	8 November 1907	8 November 1908	1 year, 0 days	
16th		Virgilio Leite de Oliveira e Silva	Brazil	8 November 1908	8 November 1909	1 year, 0 days	
17th		Virgilio Leite de Oliveira e Silva	Brazil	8 November 1909	8 November 1910	1 year, 0 days	
18th		Virgilio Leite de Oliveira e Silva	Brazil	8 November 1910	8 November 1911	1 year, 0 days	
19th		Edmundo de Azurém Furtado	Brazil	8 November 1911	8 November 1912	1 year, 0 days	
20th		Virgilio Leite de Oliveira e Silva	Brazil	8 November 1912	6 January 1913	59 days	Resigned
21st		José Pimenta de Mello Filho	Brazil	6 January 1913	8 November 1913	306 days	
22nd		Edmundo de Azurém Furtado	Brazil	8 November 1913	8 November 1914	1 year, 0 days	
23rd		Edmundo de Azurém Furtado	Brazil	8 November 1914	8 November 1915	1 year, 0 days	
24th		Raul Ferreira Serpa	Brazil	8 November 1915	8 November 1916	1 year, 0 days	
25th		Carlos Leclerc Castelo Branco	Brazil	8 November 1916	15 November 1917	1 year, 7 days	
26th		Carlos Leclerc Castelo Branco	Brazil	15 November 1917	20 November 1918	1 year, 5 days	
27th		Alberto Burle de Figueiredo	Brazil	20 November 1918	8 November 1919	353 days	
28th		Alberto Burle de Figueiredo	Brazil	8 November 1919	8 November 1920	1 year, 0 days	
29th		Faustino Monteiro Esposel	Brazil	8 November 1920	2 January 1922	1 year, 55 days	
30th		Alberto Burle de Figueiredo	Brazil	2 January 1922	24 January 1923	1 year, 22 days	
31st		Júlio Benedicto Ottoni	Brazil	24 January 1923	12 May 1924	1 year, 109 days	Resigned
32nd		Faustino Monteiro Esposel	Brazil	12 May 1924	15 December 1925	1 year, 217 days	
33rd		Faustino Monteiro Esposel	Brazil	15 December 1925	14 December 1926	364 days	
34th		Faustino Monteiro Esposel	Brazil	15 December 1926	28 April 1927	134 days	Resigned
35th		Alberto Borgerth	Brazil	28 April 1927	16 May 1927	18 days	
36th		Nilor Rollin Pinheiro	Brazil	16 May 1927	21 December 1927	219 days	
37th		Oswaldo dos Santos Jacintho	Brazil	22 December 1927	23 July 1929	1 year, 213 days	
38th		Carlos Eduardo Façanha Mamede	Brazil	3 August 1929	27 December 1929	146 days	
39th		Alfredo Dolabela Portela	Brazil	2 January 1930	16 April 1930	104 days	Resigned
40th		Manoel Joaquim de Almeida	Brazil	16 April 1930	3 November 1930	201 days	Resigned
41st		Carlos Eduardo Façanha Mamede	Brazil	4 November 1930	9 February 1931	67 days	Resigned
42nd		Rubens de Campos Farrula	Brazil	9 February 1931	9 March 1931	28 days	
43rd		Arthur Lobo da Silva	Brazil	9 March 1931	24 September 1931	199 days	Resigned
44th		José Ildefonso de Oliveira Santos	Brazil	24 September 1931	10 January 1933	1 year, 108 days	
45th		Paschoal Segreto Sobrinho	Brazil	10 January 1933	23 January 1933	13 days	Resigned
46th		José Bastos Padilha	Brazil	3 February 1933	26 December 1934	1 year, 326 days	
47th		José Bastos Padilha	Brazil	26 December 1934	7 December 1936	1 year, 347 days	
48th		José Bastos Padilha	Brazil	7 December 1936	27 December 1937	1 year, 20 days	Resigned
49th		Raul Augusto Dias Gonçalves	Brazil	27 December 1937	23 December 1938	361 days	
50th		Gustavo Adolpho de Carvalho	Brazil	23 December 1938	10 December 1940	1 year, 353 days	
51st		Gustavo Adolpho de Carvalho	Brazil	10 December 1940	10 December 1942	2 years, 0 days	
52nd		Dario de Mello Pinto	Brazil	10 December 1942	14 December 1944	2 years, 4 days	
53rd		Marino Machado de Oliveira	Brazil	14 December 1944	19 December 1945	1 year, 5 days	Resigned
54th		Dario de Mello Pinto	Brazil	20 December 1945	26 December 1945	6 days	
55th		Hilton Gonçalves dos Santos	Brazil	27 December 1945	10 December 1946	348 days	
56th		Orsini de Araújo Coriolano	Brazil	10 December 1946	14 December 1948	2 years, 4 days	
57th		Dario de Mello Pinto	Brazil	14 December 1948	11 December 1950	1 year, 362 days	
58th		Gilberto Ferreira Cardoso	Brazil	11 December 1950	12 December 1952	2 years, 1 day	
59th		Gilberto Ferreira Cardoso	Brazil	12 December 1952	14 December 1954	2 years, 2 days	
60th		Gilberto Ferreira Cardoso	Brazil	14 December 1954	16 November 1955	337 days	Deceased
61st		Antenor Coelho	Brazil	17 November 1955	12 December 1955	25 days	
62nd		José Alves Coelho de Morais	Brazil	12 December 1955	31 March 1957	1 year, 109 days	
63rd		Hilton Gonçalves dos Santos	Brazil	13 March 1957	8 March 1960	2 years, 361 days	
64th		George da Silva Fernandes	Brazil	8 March 1960	29 March 1961	1 year, 21 days	Resigned
65th		Oswaldo Gudole Aranha Filho	Brazil	29 March 1961	16 May 1961	48 days	
66th		Fadel Fadel	Brazil	16 May 1961	15 March 1963	1 year, 303 days	
67th		Fadel Fadel	Brazil	15 March 1963	31 March 1966	3 years, 16 days	
68th		Luiz Roberto Veiga de Brito	Brazil	15 March 1966	15 March 1969	3 years, 0 days	
69th		André Gustavo Richer	Brazil	15 March 1969	15 March 1971	2 years, 0 days	
70th		André Gustavo Richer	Brazil	15 March 1971	20 March 1973	2 years, 5 days	
70th		Hélio Maurício Rodrigues de Souza	Brazil	20 March 1973	27 December 1974	1 year, 282 days	
71st		Hélio Maurício Rodrigues de Souza	Brazil	27 December 1974	27 December 1976	2 years, 0 days	
72nd		Marcio Braga	Brazil	3 January 1977	3 January 1979	2 years, 0 days	
73rd		Marcio Braga	Brazil	3 January 1979	18 December 1980	1 year, 350 days	
74th		Antônio Augusto Dunshee de Abranches	Brazil	18 December 1980	6 December 1982	1 year, 361 days	
75th		Antônio Augusto Dunshee de Abranches	Brazil	6 December 1982	14 August 1983	251 days	Resigned
76th		Eduardo Fernando de Mendonça Motta	Brazil	16 August 1983	6 September 1983	21 days	
77th		George Helal	Brazil	6 September 1983	4 December 1984	1 year, 89 days	
78th		George Helal	Brazil	4 December 1984	18 December 1986	2 years, 14 days	
79th		Marcio Braga	Brazil	5 January 1987	18 May 1989	2 years, 133 days	
80th		Gilberto Cardoso Filho	Brazil	12 May 1989	10 December 1990	363 days	
81st		Marcio Braga	Brazil	10 December 1990	10 December 1992	2 years, 0 days	
82nd		Luiz Augusto Veloso	Brazil	10 December 1992	5 December 1994	1 year, 360 days	
83rd		Kléber Leite	Brazil	5 December 1994	9 December 1996	2 years, 4 days	
84th		Kléber Leite	Brazil	9 December 1996	7 December 1998	1 year, 363 days	
85th		Edmundo dos Santos Silva	Brazil	7 December 1998	4 December 2000	1 year, 363 days	
86th		Edmundo dos Santos Silva	Brazil	4 December 2000	8 July 2002	1 year, 216 days	Impeached
87th		Gilberto Cardoso Filho	Brazil	8 July 2002	13 October 2002	97 days	
88th		Hélio Paulo Ferraz	Brazil	14 October 2002	9 December 2003	1 year, 56 days	
89th		Marcio Braga	Brazil	9 December 2003	6 December 2006	2 years, 362 days	
90th		Marcio Braga	Brazil	6 December 2006	11 August 2009	2 years, 248 days	Left due to medical issues
91st		Delair Dumbrosck Mello	Brazil	11 August 2009	7 December 2009	118 days	
92nd		Patrícia Amorim	Brazil	7 December 2009	2 December 2012	2 years, 361 days	
93rd		Eduardo Bandeira de Mello	Brazil	22 December 2012	22 December 2015	3 years, 0 days	
94th		Eduardo Bandeira de Mello	Brazil	22 December 2015	22 December 2018	3 years, 0 days	
95th		Rodolfo Landim	Brazil	22 December 2018	15 December 2021	2 years, 358 days	
96th		Rodolfo Landim	Brazil	15 December 2021	18 December 2024	3 years, 3 days	
97th		Luiz Eduardo Baptista	Brazil	18 December 2024	Present	319 days	
