= Delair Dumbrosck =

Delair Dumbrosck is a former president of Clube de Regatas do Flamengo.

== Biography ==
He was president of Flamengo in 2009, after Marcio Braga left due to medical issues and after being suspended by the Court of Sporting Justice (TJD). During Delair Dumbrosck spell as Flamengo's president, the club won basketball competitions such as the NBB and the Liga Sudamericana, and football competitions such as the Campeonato Carioca.
