= Dunshee de Abranches =

Brazilian football executive (1936–2025)

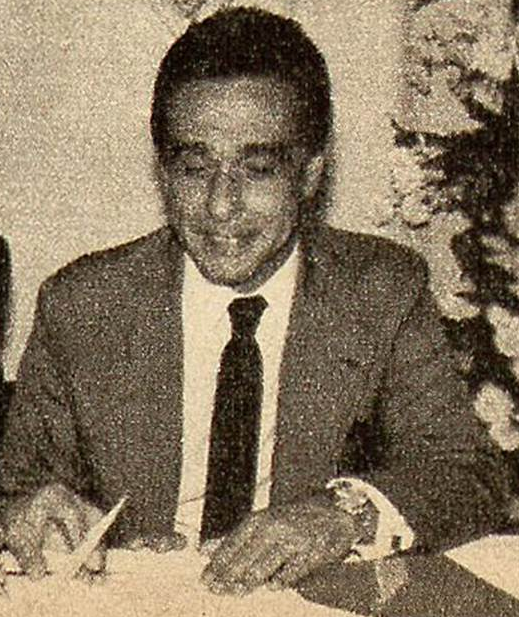
Dunshee de Abranches in 1982

Antônio Augusto Dunshee de Abranches (October 25, 1936 – September 7, 2025), commonly known as Dunshee de Abranches, was a Brazilian football executive who was the president of Clube de Regatas do Flamengo (a Brazilian sports club based in the Flamengo neighborhood, Zona Sul, Rio de Janeiro, best known for its professional football team which is the biggest in terms of fans).

== Life and career ==
Born on October 25, 1936, in Rio de Janeiro, he was Clube de Regatas do Flamengo's president from 1981 to 1983. During his administration, Flamengo won the Intercontinental Cup, the Copa Libertadores and the Campeonato Carioca in 1981, and the Série A in 1982. Dunshee de Abranches resigned in 1983, after selling Zico to Italian club Udinese.

Dunshee de Abranches died on September 7, 2025, at the age of 88.
