= Júlio César (footballer, born 1956) =

Brazilian footballer

Júlio César da Silva Gurjol
Personal information
- Date of birth: 3 March 1956 (age 70)
- Place of birth: Rio de Janeiro, Brazil
- Height: 1.78 m (5 ft 10 in)
- Position: Forward

Senior career*
Years	Team	Apps	(Gls)
1975	Flamengo		
1976	America		
1976–1977	Flamengo		
1977–1978	Remo		
1978–1981	Flamengo		
1981–1983	Talleres		
1983	Fortaleza		
1984	Vasco da Gama		
1984–1986	Grêmio		
1987–1989	Athletico Paranaense		
1990–1994	River Plate		

International career
- Brazil Olympic
- * Club domestic league appearances and goals

Júlio César da Silva Gurjol (born 3 March 1956) is a Brazilian former footballer who played as a forward. He competed in the men's tournament at the 1976 Summer Olympics. As a player, he received the nickname "Uri Geller" for his dribbling ability.

== Career ==
César started his career in 1975 playing for Flamengo. He made his debut in 1975 Brazilian Serie A, where Flamengo lost the match against Recife with the score of 1-2. In 1976, he transferred to America Football Club, but returned to Flamengo later that year and stayed until 1977, then switched to Remo, remaining there until 1978. In 1979, he returned to Flamengo. In 1981, he went to live in Argentina, where he played for Talleres de Córdoba. In Talleres he only played 27 games and scored 7 goals, before leaving the club due to financial problems of the institution. Then he went on to River Plate on trial, but was only able to play half a game in a summer tournament. In 1983, he returned to Brazil to play for Fortaleza and then to Vasco da Gama until 1984. In the following year, he arrived at Grêmio and played there until 1986. He finished his career at Athletico Paranaense and retired in 1989.
