= Eurico Miranda =

Brazilian politician and sporting director (1944–2019)

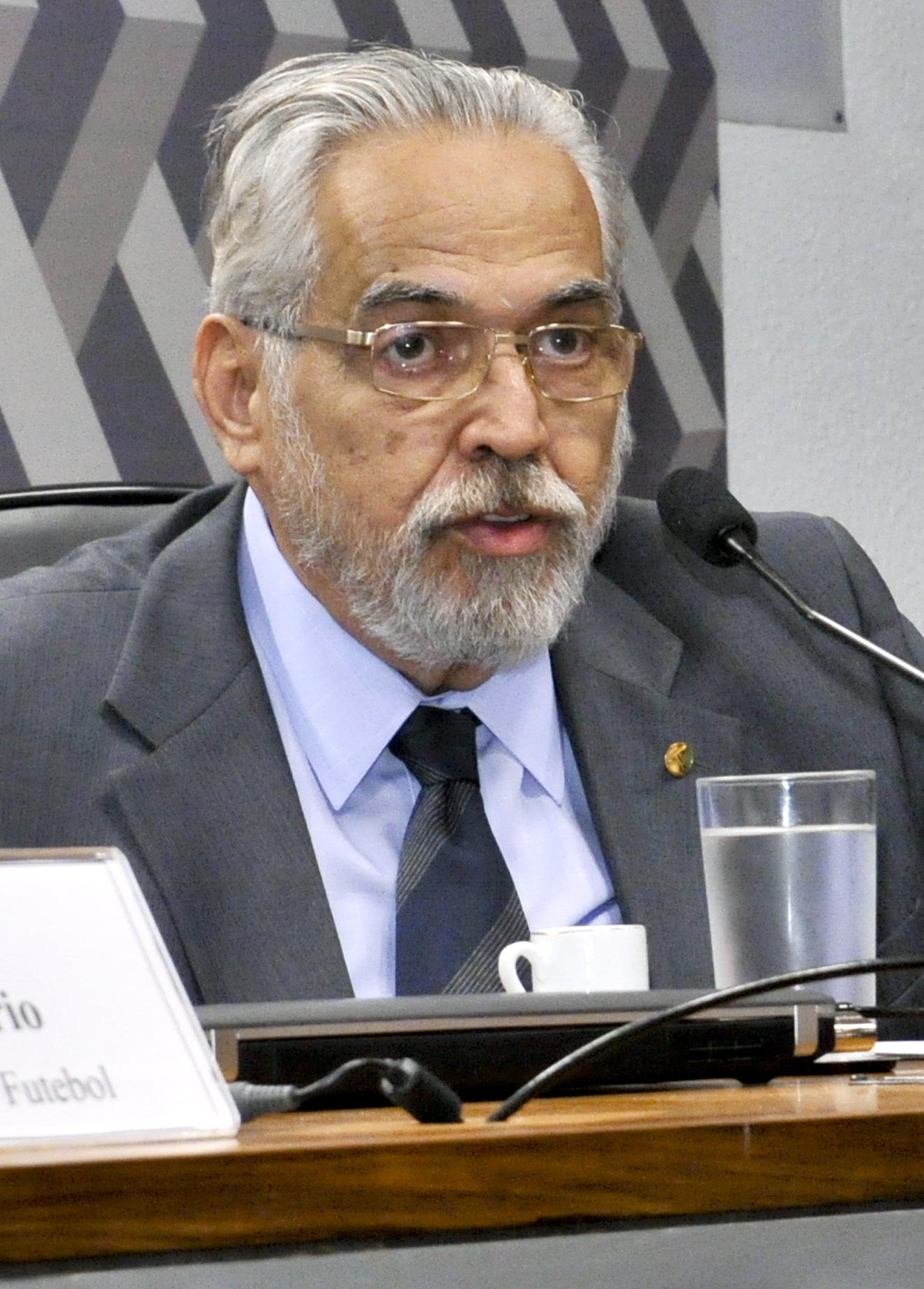

Federal Deputy for Rio de Janeiro
- In office 1 January 1995 – 31 December 2002

56th and 58th President of Vasco da Gama
- In office 2 December 2014 – 17 January 2018
- Preceded by: Roberto Dinamite
- Succeeded by: Alexandre Campello
- In office 22 January 2001 – 30 June 2008
- Preceded by: Antônio Soares Calçada
- Succeeded by: Roberto Dinamite

Personal details
- Born: Eurico Ângelo de Oliveira Miranda; June 7, 1944 Rio de Janeiro, Brazil
- Died: March 12, 2019 (aged 74) Rio de Janeiro, Brazil
- Party: Progressistas (1994–2019)
- Other political affiliations: Partido Liberal (1990–1994)
- Spouse: Sylvia Brandão Miranda (1973–2019, his death)
- Children: 4
- Parent(s): Álvaro Miranda; Alexandra de Oliveira Miranda
- Education: Pontifical Catholic University of Rio de Janeiro
- Profession: Jurist

Eurico Ângelo de Oliveira Miranda (7 June 1944 – 12 March 2019) was a Brazilian politician, jurist and sporting director. He was best known for having been president of CR Vasco da Gama for two periods, from 2001 to 2008 and 2014 to 2018. Before that, he was sporting director and vice-president of the club between 1986 and 2000. He was also a federal deputy for Rio de Janeiro state between 1995 and 2002.

Eurico was also the Brazilian Football Confederation's sporting director in 1989, responsible for the creation of the Copa do Brasil. Eurico conceived the former Clube dos 13, which brought together the country's top football clubs, and proposed the creation of a 20-club Campeonato Brasileiro Série A. He was considered by many to be one of the most influential figures in Brazilian football.

== Career at Vasco da Gama ==
He was a football advisor to the president of Vasco da Gama in 1980, and ran for club president in 1982, against Agarthyno Gomes and Antônio Soares Calçada, being defeated by the latter. He ran for president again in 1985 against Antônio Soares Calçada, being defeated again.

Eurico Miranda was the vice-president of Vasco da Gama football division between 1986 and 2000.

=== Controversy ===
In 1999, during a match between Vasco and Paraná Clube, he invaded the field, after three Vasco players were sent off by the referee, and prevented the match from being resumed. In 2000, he was accused by the Federal High Court (Supremo Tribunal Federal) of bearing responsibility for the São Januário collapse of a steel barrier, during the final match of the 2000 Campeonato Brasileiro final. Vasco da Gama won this match after defeating São Caetano.

==== Football Investigation Parliamentary Committee ====
In 2001, Eurico Miranda was the target of a series of press accusations, regarding several irregularities during his administration as vice-president, and later as president of Vasco. In that year, the Brazilian Congress convened its first investigative committee for football(a procedure known by the Portuguese acronym CPI), to investigate irregularities in the administration of Brazilian football, and Eurico Miranda was one of the people accused in the CPI's final report. A lawsuit was taken against him, but his abrogation was not approved. As Miranda was not re-elected deputy in 2002, he lost his parliamentary immunity and had several lawsuits filed against him.

== Politics ==
He was the Progressive Party's federal deputy of Rio de Janeiro State between 1995 and 2002, being elected in the 1994 and 1998 elections. In 2002 and 2006, he was again Progressive Party's federal deputy candidate, but was not elected.

In 1990, he was the Liberal Party's federal deputy candidate, but was not elected.

=== Euriquismo ===
Euriquismo ("Euriquism") is a Brazilian politico-cultural phenomenon consisting of three dimensions: the principles of the philosophy of Eurico, the methodology of its application and the separated groups, although associated with CR Vasco da Gama not necessarily part of it, operating with him. It is necessary to took this three separated dimensions under a whole to fully understand the phenomenon.
