= Fadel Fadel =

- Born: October 6, 1914; Sumidouro, Rio de Janeiro, Brazil
- Died: September 23, 1969 (aged 54); Rio de Janeiro, Brazil
- Occupation: Sports executive
- Known for: President of Clube de Regatas do Flamengo (1962–1965)
- Notable work: Inauguration of Flamengo's Olympic pool (1963)

Fadel Fadel (October 6, 1914 – September 23, 1969) was a president of Clube de Regatas do Flamengo. Flamengo's Parque Aquático Fadel Fadel (Fadel Fadel Aquatic Park) is named in his honor.

== Biography ==
Born in Sumidouro, in the state of Rio de Janeiro, of Lebanese descent, he was elected president of Flamengo in 1962, leaving the position in 1965. During his administration, he inaugurated the club's Olympic pool in 1963. Flamengo won the Campeonato Carioca in 1963 and in 1965 during his administration.

He died on September 23, 1969, in Rio de Janeiro.
