= Marcio Braga =

Brazilian football executive

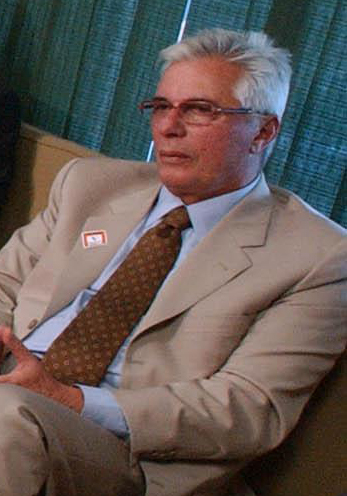
A picture of Marcio Braga

Marcio Baroukel de Souza Braga, usually known as Marcio Braga (born March 14, 1936) was president of Flamengo until the end of the 2009 season. He was born in Rio de Janeiro. Márcio Braga was previously president of the club from 1977 to 1981, 1986 to 1989 and from 1991 to 1992. In 2009, Braga left Flamengo's presidency due to medical issues and after being suspended by the Court of Sporting Justice (TJD), he was replaced by Delair Dumbrosck.
