= Edmundo dos Santos Silva =

Edmundo dos Santos Silva (born April 11, 1948) is a former president of Clube de Regatas do Flamengo.

Born in Salvador, he had two spells as the Clube de Regatas do Flamengo's president, from 1999 to 2000, and from 2001 to 2002. During his administration, Flamengo signed a R$80 million partnership with Swiss sport marketing company International Sports Licensing (ISL). He brought players such as Carlos Gamarra and Dejan Petković to play for the club. After ISL folded in 2001, Flamengo's financial problems increased. During his spell as the club's president, Flamengo won the Campeonato Carioca in 1999, 2000 and in 2001, the Copa Mercosur in 1999, and the Copa dos Campeões in 2001. He suffered an impeachment in 2002, leaving the club's presidency.
