= Kléber Leite =

Brazilian football club president

Kléber Fonseca de Souza Leite, commonly known as Kléber Leite (born May 5, 1949) is a former president of Clube de Regatas do Flamengo.

== Biography ==
Born in Rio de Janeiro, he worked as a field reporter for Rádio Globo before being elected as Clube de Regatas do Flamengo's president. Kléber Leite was president of the club from 1995 to 1998. He brought Romário back to Brazil to play for Flamengo, as well as a hundred other players. During his spell as the club's president, Flamengo won the Campeonato Carioca in 1996.
